= Go Soo =

South Korean actor (born 1978)

- Go Soo in 2026
- Born: October 4, 1978 (age 48); Nonsan, South Korea
- Education: Sangmyung University
- Occupation: Actor
- Years active: 1998–present
- Spouse: Kim Hye-yeon (m. 2012)
- Children: 3

Korean name
- Hangul: 고수
- Hanja: 高洙
- RR: Go Su
- MR: Ko Su

Go Soo (Korean: 고수; born October 4, 1978), also known as Ko Soo, is a South Korean actor. He has appeared in television series such as Piano, Green Rose and Will It Snow for Christmas?, as well as the films White Night and The Front Line.

== Early life and education ==
Go was born and raised in Nonsan, South Korea as the youngest of 2 sons. He attended college in Sangmyung University, Cheonan campus, where he majored in Cinema degree.

== Career ==
=== 1998–2005: Debut and breakout fame ===
When Go Soo first came to Seoul, he acted on stage, but he lacked money that time. Since he lacked money, he decided to put his stage acting on hold for later and eventually stopped. From then on, he began presenting his profile photo to numerous agencies. Go first appeared in a soft drink TV commercial, followed by a role as an extra in the 1998 music video "Last Promise" by the band Position. He made his television debut in 1999 through the MBC sitcoms My Funky Family, Jump, and Nonstop and KBS2 drama series Ad Madness. Go drew critical praise for his performance in the television drama Piano in 2001, with one review describing him as an "actor with precision". Piano was produced and aired by SBS, and after this, his TV series were all under SBS, making it his home media network. His next series with SBS was Age of Innocence, where he worked w/ actress Kim Min-hee, Park Jung-chul, Han Eun-jung, and veteran actor Kim Kap-soo.

Go reunited with Ad Madness co-star Park Ye-jin in TV series When A Man Loves A Woman in 2004. Go made his big screen debut as a drug crime officer in 2004's Some, in which he performed his own stunts and was later recognized as Best New Actor at the Grand Bell Awards. In 2005, he starred in the revenge drama Green Rose, which was shot on location in China and Korea. He played a simple man who falls in love with a rich woman and gets accused of a crime he did not commit. Then in the romantic comedy Marrying a Millionaire, Go played a delivery man who is asked by a TV producer to act like a rich bachelor to attract several women on a televised reality dating show.

=== Since 2009: Comeback ===
For his first post-army project, Go surprised fans by choosing a stage play. Invited to join the "Best Play Series" by veteran actor Cho Jae-hyun (Cho was his costar in Piano where Cho portrayed his father, and the senior colleague he "most respects"), Go made his theater debut as the lead actor in The Return of President Eom, which ran from May 23 to August 3, 2008.

In 2009, he starred in the dark mystery film White Night, based on the Japanese novel Byakuyakō by Keigo Higashino. Go said he was "completely absorbed by the intriguing storyline." Go then made his television comeback in the melodrama Will It Snow for Christmas?, a tale of rekindled childhood love penned by renowned TV writer Lee Kyung-hee. He described his character as "hurt by love and tries to overcome that pain."

His next film Haunters, in which he played the only man immune to a psychic's supernatural powers, was a box office hit in 2010. On May 13, 2011, he signed under the management of Lee Byung-hun known as BH Entertainment, where he reunited w/ his Age of Innocence costar Kim Min-hee & When a Man Loves a Woman costar Bae Soo-bin. He next played a soldier in the Korean War-set The Front Line, then a grieving firefighter in the 2012 romance drama Love 911.

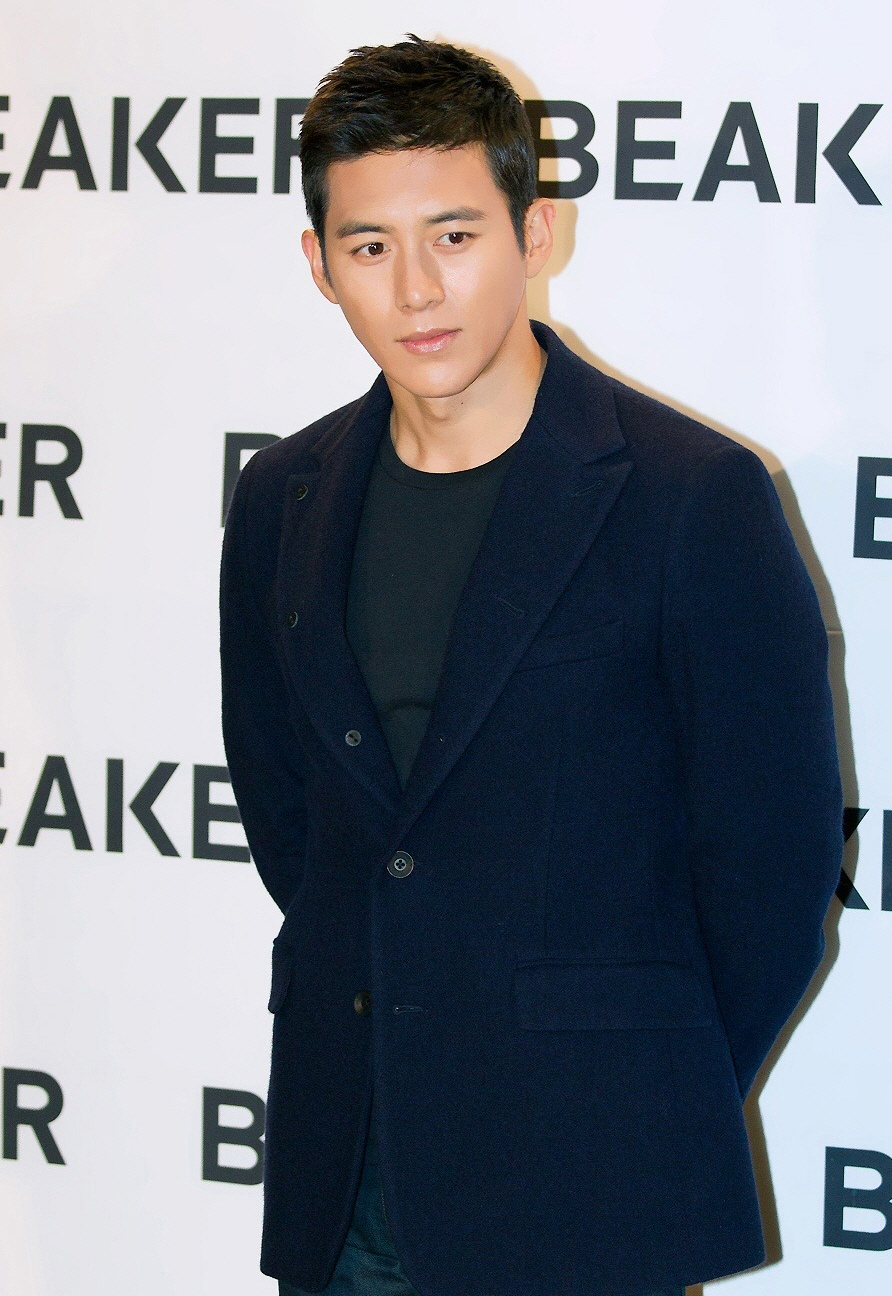
Go in 2012

Afterwards, he collaborated with the makers of The Chaser for Empire of Gold, a TV series about the power struggle within a rich family living through Korea's turbulent economy of the 1990s, produced by SBS; in this series, he played an antihero. Later that year, he starred in melodrama film Way Back Home, playing the devastated husband of a woman wrongfully accused of drug smuggling. Go said the reason he chose the film was because he wanted to work with acclaimed actress Jeon Do-yeon, and that through his character he "was able to tackle the challenge of internal and external change".

In 2014, Go appeared in two short films. Directed by Kang Je-gyu, Awaiting is about a married couple separated for sixty years by the division of North and South Korea. Awaiting was one of the four short films comprising Beautiful 2014, an omnibus project that premiered at the 38th Hong Kong International Film Festival. Meanwhile, Myohyangsangwan ("View of Myohyangsan"), which depicted the rendezvous of a South Korean painter and a North Korean waitress in a North Korean restaurant, is a collaboration by contemporary artists Moon Kyung-won and Jeon Joon-ho, and combined a theatrical plot, experimental imagery, dance and performance art. He then starred in the period film The Royal Tailor, in the role of an upstart new designer whose talent and instincts challenges the traditional master artisan of royal attire.

In June 2015, Go Soo has amicably parted ways with BH Entertainment, and joined a new agency named Yubon Company founded by his previous manager at BH Entertainment. He then returned to BH Entertainment in February 2017.

Go made his small screen comeback after three years in MBC's 55th-founding anniversary historical drama directed by a famed director Lee Byung-hoon, The Flower in Prison.

In 2017, Go starred in Lucid Dream, a psychological thriller in which Go played a former journalist who attempts to find his kidnapped son using lucid dreaming. The same year, Go starred in The Tooth and the Nail, a film based on the 1955 mystery novel by Bill S. Ballinger in which a magician discovers the incinerated teeth and fingernails of his missing butler. He next starred in period epic film The Fortress, where he worked with his manager Lee Byung-hun.

In 2018, Go was cast in the medical drama Heart Surgeons as a cardiothoracic surgery resident trying to save his mother in need of a heart transplant.

In September 2026, after 15 years, Go parted ways with his longtime agency BH Entertainment.

He will return to a series named Nine to Six, this marks his silver (25th) anniversary of his service and loyalty to his home network SBS after his first project Piano.

== Personal life ==
=== Military service ===
Go began his two-year mandatory military service on March 2, 2006 and he was assigned as a Civil Service Personnel in Gangnam District, Seoul. He was discharged on April 25, 2008, and received recognition for being an outstanding Public Interest Service Personnel.

=== Marriage and family ===
Go began dating Kim Hye-yeon, an art student eleven years his junior, shortly after meeting her in 2008. The couple married on February 17, 2012 at the Shilla Hotel in Seoul. Their son was born on January 28, 2013, and their daughter was born on April 17, 2015. On September 13, 2017, his wife gave birth to their 3rd child.

== Filmography ==
=== Film ===
Key
†	Denotes films that have not yet been released

Year	Title	Role	Notes	Ref.
2004	Some	Kang Sung-joo		
2009	White Night	Kim Yo-han		
2010	Haunters	Im Kyu-nam		
2011	The Front Line	Kim Soo-hyuk		
2012	Love 911	Chun Kang-il		
2013	Way Back Home	Kim Jong-bae		
2014	Awaiting	Kim Min-woo	Short film	
2014	View of Mount Myohyang	South Korean painter	Short film	
2014	The Royal Tailor	Lee Gong-jin		
2016	The Last Princess	Prince Lee Woo	Cameo	
2017	Lucid Dream	Choi Dae-ho		
2017	The Tooth and the Nail	Lee Suk-jin / Choi Seung-man		
2017	The Fortress	Seo Nal-soi		
2022	Bystanders	Jeong Ik-jeong	Web short film	

=== Television series ===
Key
†	Denotes television productions that have not yet been released

Year	Title	Role	Notes	Ref.
1999	Ad Madness			
1999	Jump	Go Soo		
1999	My Funky Family	Go Soo		
2000	Say It with Your Eyes	Jang Ki-ryong		
2000	Nonstop	Go Soo		
2000	Mom and Sister	Jang Kyung-bin		
2001	Piano	Han Jae-soo		
2002	Age of Innocence	Tae-suk		
2003	My Fair Lady	Shin Young-ho		
2004	When a Man Loves a Woman	Ji-hoon		
2005	Green Rose	Lee Jung-hyun / Jang Joong-won		
2005	Marrying a Millionaire	Kim Young-hoon		
2009	Will It Snow for Christmas?	Cha Kang-jin		
2013	Empire of Gold	Jang Tae-joo		
2016	Flowers of the Prison	Yoon Tae-won		
2018	Heart Surgeons	Park Tae-soo		
2019	Flower Crew: Joseon Marriage Agency	Crown Prince	Cameo; Episode 1	
2020	Money Game	Chae Yi-hun		
2020–2023	Missing: The Other Side	Kim Wook	Season 1–2	
2024	Parole Examiner Lee	Lee Han-shin		
2026	Reverse	Jun-ho		
2026–2027	Nine to Six †	Park Hyun-tae		

=== Web shows ===
Year	Title	Role	Notes	Ref.
2023	Saturday Night Live Korea	Host	Season 3 Episode 9	

=== Music video appearances ===
Year	Title	Artist	Ref.
1998	"Last Promise"	Position	
1998	"Pig Man"	Noise	
1998	"Letter"	Position	
2000	"U Got the Funk"	Lee Hyun-do (Deux)	
2001	"I'll Be Back"	Yoo Seung-joon	
2002	"Sadness"	Kang Hyung-rok	
2002	"A Sad Gift"	Kim Jang-hoon	
2003	"1:1"	Juju Club	
2003	"I Still Bite My Lips"	Lee Soo-young	
2003	"Left Alone"	Lee Soo-young	
2004	"Confession"	Park Hye-kyung	
2004	"Burying My Face in Tears"	Jang Na-ra	
2022	"Distance"	Lee Seok-hoon	

== Stage ==
=== Theatre ===
Year	Title	Role	Ref.
2008	The Return of President Eom (돌아온 엄사장)	Eom Go-soo	

== Discography ==
Year	Title	Notes	Ref.
2006	I Will Be Happy	Poetry readings	

== Awards and nominations ==
Name of the award ceremony, year presented, category, nominee of the award, and the result of the nomination
Award ceremony	Year	Category	Nominee / Work	Result	Ref.
APAN Star Awards	2013	Top Excellence Award, Actor	Empire of Gold	Nominated	
APAN Star Awards	2016	Grand Prize (Daesang)	The Flower in Prison	Nominated	
APAN Star Awards	2016	Top Excellence Award, Actor in a Serial Drama	The Flower in Prison	Nominated	
APAN Star Awards	2023	Top Excellence Award, Actor in a Serial Drama	Missing: The Other Side 2	Won	
APAN Star Awards	2023	Excellence Award, Actor in a Short Drama	O'PENing: Summer, Love Machine, Blues	Nominated	
Blue Dragon Film Awards	2004	Best New Actor	Some	Nominated	
Blue Dragon Film Awards	2010	Best New Actor	White Night	Nominated	
Blue Dragon Film Awards	2011	Popular Star Award	The Front Line	Won	
Blue Dragon Film Awards	2011	Best Actor	The Front Line	Nominated	
Bucheon International Fantastic Film Festival	2010	Fantasia Award	White Night	Won	
Golden Cinema Festival	2014	Best Actor	Way Back Home	Won	
Grand Bell Awards	2005	Best New Actor	Some	Won	
Korea Best Dresser Swan Awards	2003	Model Line – Popularity Award	Go Soo	Won	
MBC Drama Awards	2000	Best New Actor	Mothers and Sisters	Won	
MBC Drama Awards	2016	Top Excellence Award, Actor in a Special Project Drama	Flowers of the Prison	Nominated	
SBS Drama Awards	2001	New Star Award	Piano	Won	
SBS Drama Awards	2001	Popularity Award	Piano	Won	
SBS Drama Awards	2002	Excellence Award, Actor in a Drama Special	Age of Innocence	Won	
SBS Drama Awards	2002	Top 10 Stars	Age of Innocence	Won	
SBS Drama Awards	2002	Top Excellence Award, Actor	Age of Innocence	Nominated	
SBS Drama Awards	2003	Excellence Award, Actor in a Drama Special	My Fair Lady	Nominated	
SBS Drama Awards	2005	Excellence Award, Actor in a Special Planning Drama	Green Rose	Won	
SBS Drama Awards	2005	Top 10 Stars	Green Rose / Marrying a Millionaire	Won	
SBS Drama Awards	2005	Top Excellence Award, Actor	Green Rose / Marrying a Millionaire	Nominated	
SBS Drama Awards	2013	Top Excellence Award, Actor in a Drama Special	Empire of Gold	Nominated	
SBS Drama Awards	2018	Top Excellence Award, Actor in a Wednesday-Thursday Drama	Heart Surgeons	Nominated	
Style Icon Awards	2011	Top 10 Style Icons	Go Soo	Won	
