= Kang Hye-jung =

South Korean actress (born 1982)

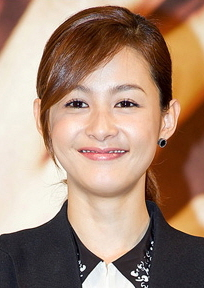
- Kang at The Wedding Scheme premiere on March 30, 2012
- Born: January 4, 1982 (age 44); Incheon, South Korea
- Education: Seoul Institute of the Arts - Theater
- Occupation: Actress
- Years active: 1998–present
- Spouse: Tablo (m. 2009)
- Children: 1

Korean name
- Hangul: 강혜정
- RR: Gang Hyejeong
- MR: Kang Hyejŏng

Kang Hye-jung (Korean: 강혜정; born January 4, 1982) is a South Korean actress. Making her film debut in arthouse film Nabi (2001), she rose to stardom and critical acclaim in Park Chan-wook's 2003 revenge thriller Oldboy. A rising star early in her career, she gained acting awards for Han Jae-rim's relationship drama Rules of Dating (2005), and Park Kwang-hyun's Korean War comedy Welcome to Dongmakgol (2005).

Following roles as a developmentally disabled daughter in Herb (2007), a suicidal woman in Kill Me (2009), as well as her marriage to Tablo in 2009, Kang began starring in more conventional melodramas in TV and film such as Girlfriends (2009), Miss Ripley (2011), The Wedding Scheme (2012), Lucid Dream (2017) and Jugglers (2017–2018). Her major theatre stints include Korean stage adaptations of Proof (2010) and Educating Rita (2014–2015).

== Career ==
=== 1998–2009: Early rise, critical success ===
Kang Hye-jung began working as a model in her first year of high school.

Throughout the late 1990s she appeared in small roles in TV dramas and sitcoms such as Jump and Nonstop 3. Her first film role was in Moon Seung-wook's arthouse/sci-fi film Nabi, for which she won a Best Actress award at the Puchon International Fantastic Film Festival. Following this she appeared in a short film by Song Il-gon titled Flush as well as an internet film Naebang-nebang.

Kang's first major hit film was opposite Choi Min-sik in the modern-day classic Oldboy by Park Chan-wook. Her portrayal of the character Mi-do won her considerable attention both domestically and abroad, and she also picked up acting honors from the Grand Bell Awards and Pusan Film Critics Association. The following year she also appeared in Cut, Park's 30-minute contribution to the omnibus horror film Three... Extremes.

It was in 2005, however, that Kang established herself as a star outside of her appearance in Oldboy. The sharp-edged relationship drama Rules of Dating, in which she starred opposite Park Hae-il, proved to be an unexpected hit, and then two months later she took a small but central role in box office megahit Welcome to Dongmakgol. In a 2005 survey of influential movie producers, she was ranked among the top ten most bankable stars.

In 2006, she starred in Love Phobia opposite then-boyfriend Cho Seung-woo, as well as the Thai film Invisible Waves by rising directorial star Pen-ek Ratanaruang.

After playing the developmentally disabled daughter to veteran actress Bae Jong-ok in the 2007 melodrama Herb, in 2009 Kang starred in two unconventional romantic comedies with roles she imbued with her trademark quirkiness. She said she chose Why Did You Come to My House? hoping to "expand the realms" of her lovelorn stalker character; the director said she had written the script with Kang in mind from the beginning. In Kill Me, she played a woman who, after several suicide attempts, hires a professional assassin (Shin Hyun-joon) to kill her, but he falls in love with her instead.

=== 2009–present: Turn to conventional roles ===
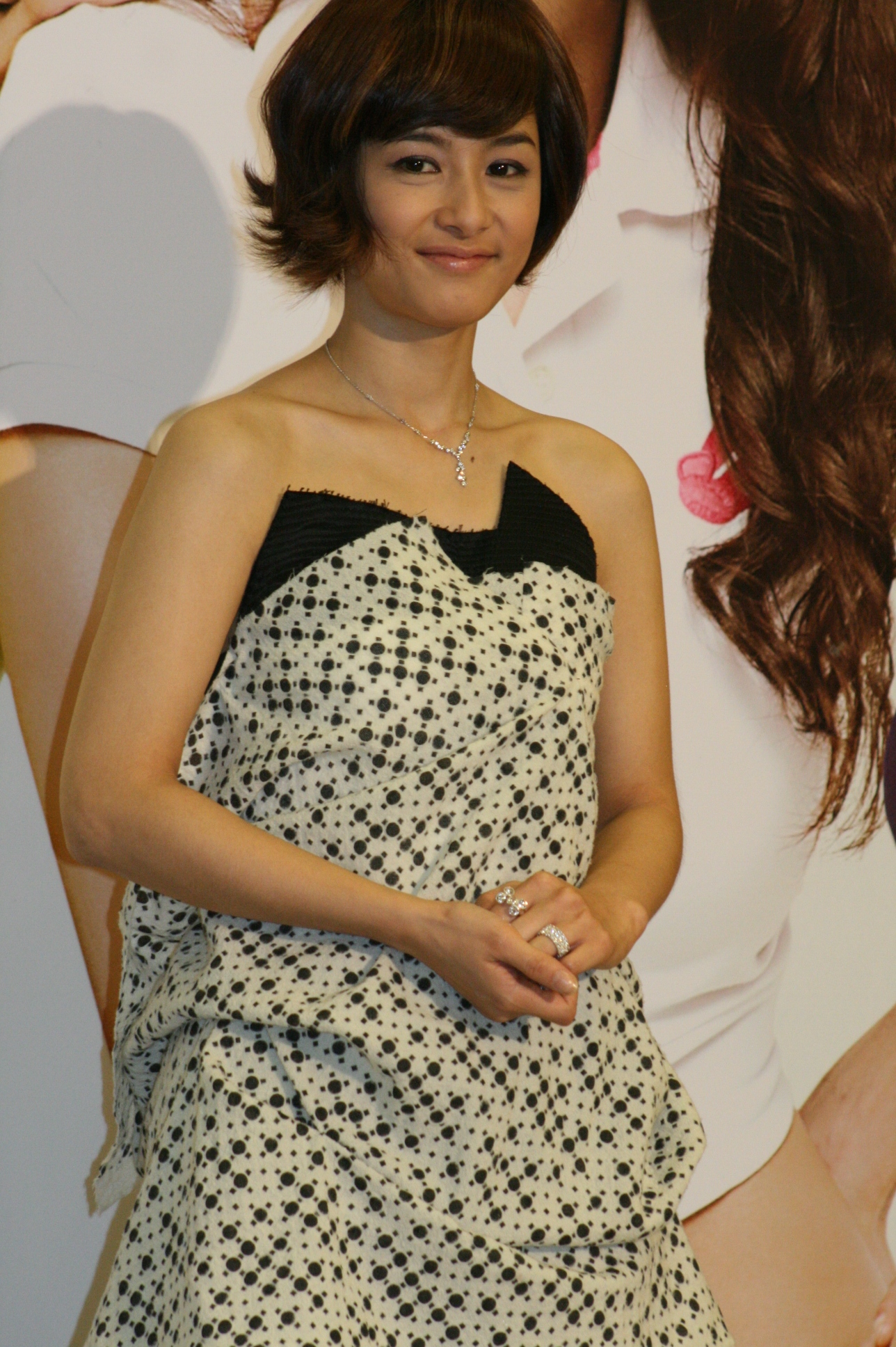
Kang in 2009

Known for taking risky roles, Kang gradually started going off the predictable path that the public expected her to take. In the 2009 film Girlfriends, she played an ordinary twenty-something girl who goes through growing pains and lovelife troubles when she discovers that her boyfriend is also involved with two other women. Kang said that this career shift reflects the limited number of interesting scripts that she receives, as well as her calmer, softer state of mind after settling down.

In 2010, Kang appeared in her first stage play Proof, portraying the role of Catherine, who worries whether she has inherited all of her mathematician father's genius and lunacy.

After making the little-seen 2007 KBS drama Flowers for My Life with Cha Tae-hyun, Kang returned to television in 2011 in MBC's Miss Ripley, a tale of one woman (Lee Da-hae) who spins a web of love, ambition and lies. Originally touted as a drama with four lead roles, Kang later expressed dismay and disappointment with her drastically reduced screen time.

Kang made her English-language debut in the culture-clash romantic comedy Wedding Palace. Director Christine Yoo reportedly cast Kang after her distinctly Korean beauty in Oldboy and Welcome to Dongmakgol grabbed Yoo's attention. Shot over a one-year period between October 2008 through November 2009, the US-Korea co-production premiered at the 2011 Los Angeles Asian Pacific Film Festival and received the Independent Feature Filmmakers Award at the 2011 Cine Gear Expo.

Kang was next seen in rom-com cable TV series The Wedding Scheme, about a kimchi factory president so determined to marry off her four daughters that she embarks on a grand marriage project by getting her girls to cohabitate with prospective groom candidates. Of her role as the second eldest daughter, a strong and smart career woman, she said, "I've played a lot of nice or innocent characters before, so I think of this as a chance to take on a new challenge."

Kang left her previous management agency YG Entertainment (which is also her husband's label) in 2013, and signed with C-JeS Entertainment. She then played a small role in E J-yong's mockumentary Behind the Camera, and wrote the lyrics to "Good Thing," one of the songs on Bobby Kim's album Mirror.

Kang starred in her second stage play Educating Rita in late 2014, about the relationship between a hairdresser and a middle-aged university lecturer. She also played a supporting role in the film How to Steal a Dog.

In 2016, Kang was cast in the film My Wife.

In 2017, Kang played a psychiatrist in the sci-fi thriller Lucid Dream. She made her return to television in December 2017 with office comedy series Jugglers.

== Personal life ==
Kang majored in Performing Arts at the Seoul Institute of the Arts.

=== Marriage and family ===
On October 26, 2009, Kang married Tablo of hip hop group Epik High while she was three months pregnant. The couple's daughter, Haru, was born on May 2, 2010. Their family was featured in the variety The Return of Superman.

== Filmography ==
=== Film ===
Year	Title	Role	Notes
2000	Flush		short film
2001	Nabi	Yuki	
2003	Oldboy	Mi-do	
2004	Three... Extremes	Director's wife	segment: "Cut"
2005	Hoodwinked!	Red Puckett (voice)	animated film, Korean dubbed
2005	Antarctic Journal	Lee Yoo-jin	
2005	Rules of Dating	Choi Hong	
2005	Sympathy for Lady Vengeance	TV announcer (cameo)	
2005	Welcome to Dongmakgol	Yeo-il	
2006	Invisible Waves	Noi	Thai film
2006	Love Phobia	Ari	
2007	Herb	Cha Sang-eun	
2009	Why Did You Come to My House?	Lee Soo-kang	
2009	Kill Me	Seo Jin-young	
2009	Triangle	Oh Sung-hye	telecinema
2009	Girlfriends	Song-yi	
2011	Wedding Palace	Na-young	American film
2013	Behind the Camera		
2014	How to Steal a Dog	Jeong-hyeon	
2017	Lucid Dream	So-hyun	
2017	My Wife		
2017	The Man Only I Can See		Special appearance

=== Television series ===
Year	Title	Role
1998	Eun-shil	Jang Young-chae
1999	Jump	
2003	Nonstop 3	Hye-jung (guest)
2003	Naebang nebang	
2007	Flowers for My Life	Na Ha-na
2008	On Air	Herself (cameo, episodes 5 & 12)
2011	Miss Ripley	Moon Hee-joo
2012	The Wedding Scheme	Yoo Gun-hee
2013–2015	The Return of Superman	Herself (episodes 1 – 58)
2014	Drama Festival: "Lump in My Life"	Geum-ji
2017–2018	Jugglers	Wang Jeong-ae

=== Music video appearances ===
Year	Song title	Artist
1997	"Time"	Taesaja
2002	"Please"	Wax
2003	"Lonely Street Lights"	Han Young-ae
2003	"Desperado"	Position
2004	[Part 1] "Timeless"	SG Wannabe
2004	[Part 2] "I Loved You to Death"	SG Wannabe
2008	"As I Look Into the Mirror"	Gummy feat. Red Roc
2015	"Sold Out"	Yankie feat. Tablo, Zion.T, Loco

== Theater ==
Year	Title	Role
2010	Proof	Catherine
2014–2015	Educating Rita	Susan

== Discography ==
=== Soundtrack appearances ===
Year	Title	Notes
2007	"Moments When We're Together"	duet with Bae Jong-ok; track from the Herb OST

== Awards and nominations ==
Year presented, name of the award ceremony, award category, nominated work and the result of the nomination
Year	Award	Category	Nominated work	Result	Ref.
2001	Puchon International Fantastic Film Festival	Best Actress	Nabi	Won	
2003	Blue Dragon Film Awards	Best Supporting Actress	Oldboy	Won	
2004	Grand Bell Awards	Best New Actress	Oldboy	Nominated	
2004	Korean Association of Film Critics Awards	Best New Actress	Oldboy	Won	
2004	Busan Film Critics Awards	Best Actress	Oldboy	Won	
2004	Korean Film Awards	Best Actress	Oldboy	Nominated	
2005	Premiere Rising Star Awards	Recipient	—N/a	Won	
2005	Busan Film Critics Awards	Best Actress	Rules of Dating	Won	
2005	Blue Dragon Film Awards	Best Actress	Rules of Dating	Nominated	
2005	Blue Dragon Film Awards	Best Supporting Actress	Welcome to Dongmakgol	Won	
2005	Korean Film Awards	Best Actress	Rules of Dating	Nominated	
2005	Korean Film Awards	Best Supporting Actress	Welcome to Dongmakgol	Won	
2006	Baeksang Arts Awards	Best Actress	Rules of Dating	Nominated	
2006	Grand Bell Awards	Best Supporting Actress	Welcome to Dongmakgol	Won	
2007	Korean Film Awards	Best Actress	Herb	Nominated	
2007	KBS Drama Awards	Top Excellence Award, Actress	Flowers for My Life	Nominated	
