= Park Ji-il =

South Korean television and film actor

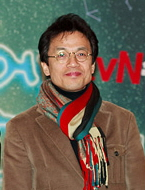
- Park in 2012
- Born: September 1960 (age 66); Busan Metropolitan City, South Korea
- Education: Chung-Ang University - Graduate, School of Theater Studies
- Occupations: Film actor; theater actor
- Years active: 1995–present
- Agent(s): S Y & T

Korean name
- Hangul: 박지일
- RR: Bak Jiil
- MR: Pak Chiil

Park Ji-il (Korean: 박지일, born September 1960) is a South Korean theatre, film and television actor. He is known for his supporting roles in various TV series and films. His better known works are: 2011 TV series The Thorn Birds, 2013 thriller film The Suspect and 2017 historical drama series The Rebel. He has appeared in more than 75 TV series, theatrical plays and films including 2020 political drama film The Man Standing Next. In 2022, he appeared in TV series Artificial City and is appearing in Tracer and Thirty-Nine.

== Education ==
- Graduated from Busan Commercial High School
- Bachelor of Accounting, Dong-A University
- Graduate, School of Drama, Chung-Ang University

== Career ==
Park Ji-il made his theater debut in 1986 with the play Death Fugue. Since then he appeared in stage dramas Crime and Punishment and Mamma Mia among others.

Park debuted on big screen in 1995 with the film My Dear Keum-hong.

In 2021, Park was cast in The National Theater Company's play Angels in America part 1 and part 2, the representative work of American playwright Tony Kushner, Angels in America as Roy Marcus Cohn alongside his son Park Yong-woo, who plays an active role as a former drag queen.

In 2022, Park appeared in TV series Thirty-Nine as adoptive father of Cha Mi-jo, the character portrayed by Son Ye-jin.

== Filmography ==
=== Films ===
Year	Title	Role	Notes	Ref.
1995	My Dear Keum-hong	Kim Gi-rim		
1998	A Promise	Jang Woo-Sin		
1999	Shiri			
1999	Nowhere to Hide			
1999	Happy End	Bank clerk		
2000	The Foul King			
2002	Chi-hwa-seon	Kwak Seong-min		
2008	Portrait of a Beauty	Sin Han-pyeong		
2013	Commitment	Director of National Intelligence		
2013	The Suspect	Executive director Song		
2013	Way Back Home	Police officer Lee Soo		
2016	The Net	Executive		
2017	Ordinary Person	General manager Lee		
2017	The Fortress	Deputy Chief Scholar		
2017	Brothers in Heaven	Director Park		
2018	Live Again, Love Again	Representative Kim		
2018	The Princess and the Matchmaker	Yoon Hyeon		
2019	Spring Again	Ho-min's father		
2020	OK! Madam	North Pole		
2020	The Man Standing Next	Kim Gye-hoon		

=== Television series ===
Year	Title	Role	Notes	Ref.
2001	Piano			
2004	Sweet 18	Heyok-joon's uncle		
2004	Toji, the Land	Choi Chi-soo - Choi Cham-pan		
2006	Goodbye Solo	Young-sook's husband		
2006	Dae Jo-yeong	Boo Ji-gwang		
2009	Empress Cheonchu	Kim Shim-eom		
2009	Style	Lee Suk-chang		
2011	The Thorn Birds	Choi Jong-dal		
2012	12 Signs of Love	Chan-sung		
2012	Love Rain	Kim Chang-mo		
2012	Ghost	Director Moon		
2013	The Virus	Director Moon		
2013	Empire of Gold	Kang Ho-yeon		
2014	Jeong Do-jeon	Yi Saek		
2014	Emergency Couple	Yoon Sung-gil		
2014	The Greatest Marriage	Seo Hoi-pyung		
2015	Hogu's Love	Byeon Kang-se		
2015	The Jingbirok: A Memoir of Imjin War	Gubong Song Ik-pil		
2015	Splendid Politics	Kim Je-nam		
2015	The Scholar Who Walks the Night	Kim Sung-yeol's father	Cameo	
2015	Assembly	Oh Se-chang	Special appearance	
2015	Last			
2015	The Village: Achiara's Secret	Park Cheon-sik		
2016	Happy Home	Lee Seok-ho		
2016	The Royal Gambler	Lee I-myeong		
2016	Entertainer			
2016–2017	The Legend of the Blue Sea	Manager Nam		
2017	Good Manager	Head of department Choi Ik-joong		
2017	The Rebel	Lee Se-jwa		
2017	Duel	Park San-young		
2017	Hospital Ship	Seol Jae-chan		
2017	Money Flower	Na Gi-chul		
2017	Live Up to Your Name	Cheongwadae		
2018	Queen of Mystery 2	Kang Bo-guk		
2018	Live	Han Jeong-oh's biological father	Special appearance	
2018	Partners for Justice	Pyo Yoo-sung	Season 1	
2018	Love to the End	Yoon Sang-min		
2018	The Third Charm	Joon-young's father		
2018	Where Stars Land	Seo In-woo's father (homeless man)		
2019	Touch Your Heart	Kwon Jae-bok	Special appearance	
2019	Nokdu Flower	Song Bong-gil		
2020	Money Game	Kim Ho-joong		
2020	The Game: Towards Zero	Nam Woo-hyeon		
2020	Forest	Jung Byung-hyuk		
2020	How to Buy a Friend			
2020–2021	Delayed Justice	Kim Byung-dae		
2021	One the Woman	Han Kang-sik		
2021–2022	Artificial City	Min Seong-sik		
2022	Tracer	Baek Seung-ryong		
2022	Thirty-Nine	Professor Cha Yoo-hyeok		
2023	Agency	Cho Moon-ho		
2023	Delightfully Deceitful	Shin Gi-ho		
2026	Bloody Flower	Baek Sang-Hwa		

=== Theater ===
Year	Title	Native title	Role	Notes/Ref.
2004	Mamma Mia	맘마미아	Bill	
2004	Sea and Sun	바다와 양산		
2005	Little Shop of Horus	리틀샵 오브 호러스	Musical (Orin)	
2016	Song of Sorrow	슬픔의 노래	Park Woon-hyeong	
2017	Orphans	오펀스	Harold	
2018	Saerom Min - Christians	민새롬 - 크리스천스	Paul (Pastor)	
2021	Angels in America-Part One	엔젤스 인 아메리카	Roy Marcus Cohn	Representative work of Angels in America
2022	Angels in America-Part Two: Perestroika	엔젤스 인 아메리카-파트 투 : 페레스트로이카	Roy Marcus Cohn	
2022–2023	Orphans	오펀스	Harold	
