= Age of Innocence (TV series) =

South Korean television series

- Also known as: The Era of Innocence
- Hangul: 순수의 시대
- Hanja: 純粹의 時代
- RR: Sunsuui sidae
- MR: Sunsuŭi sidae
- Developed by: Goo Bon-geun
- Written by: Lee Jeong-seon
- Directed by: Kim Jong-hyuk; Kang Shin-hyo
- Starring: Go Soo; Kim Min-hee; Park Jung-chul
- No. of episodes: 16

Production
- Editor: Kim Hyun-woo
- Running time: 70 minutes Wednesdays and Thursdays at 21:55 (KST)

Original release
- Network: SBS TV
- Release: July 3 – August 22, 2002

Age of Innocence (Korean: 순수의 시대; RR: Sunsuui sidae) is a 2002 South Korean television series starring Go Soo, Kim Min-hee and Park Jung-chul. It aired on SBS from July 3 to August 22, 2002, every Wednesday and Thursday at 21:55 (KST). This is the second series of Go Soo w/ SBS after Piano.

== Storyline ==
Lee Tae-seok (Go Soo), Hong Ji-yoon (Kim Min-hee), and Kim Min-soo (Yeo Hyun-soo) are best friends in high school. Tae-seok, the son of divorced parents, lives with his father whom he grew up; when Tae-seok was a child, he witnessed his mother committed an illegitimate affair with another man. He and his best friend Min-soo both fall in love with Ji-yoon. For this reason, Tae-seok hides his love for Ji-yoon. Unfortunately for Min-soo, Ji-yoon returns Tae-seok's feelings. One day, Min-soo witnesses a kiss between Tae-seok and Ji-yoon. Feeling betrayed, he commits suicide in front of Tae-seok.

Seven years later, Tae-seok is a serious CF producer and has a new best friend named Yoo Dong-hwa (Park Jung-chul). Incidentally, the woman Dong-hwa wants to marry is Ji-yoon, Tae-seok's first love. Fate has once again toyed with Tae-seok as Ji-yoon is reintroduced to him as his best friend's girlfriend. In another twist of fate, the woman who now loves Tae-seok is Min-soo's sister. Tae-seok must make a decision between the two women, but does not want to make the same mistake he made 7 years ago. However, Dong-hwa soon discovers Ji-yoon and Tae-seok's past, as told by Min-soo's sister. Dong-hwa can't help but feel betrayed, just as Min-soo did in the past. In the end, Tae-seok chose the happiness of his best friend Dong-hwa and Ji-yoon; Tae-seok remained single as he has a father & a roommate Lee Young-hee (his father's ex-student who becomes an older brother & second father figure) who love and take care of him.

== Cast ==
=== Main ===
- Go Soo as Lee Tae-seok
- Kim Min-hee as Hong Ji-yoon
- Park Jung-chul as Yoo Dong-hwa

=== Supporting ===
==== People around Lee Tae-seok ====
- Kim Kap-soo as Tae-seok's father
- Yeo Hyun-soo as Kim Min-soo
- Han Eun-jung as Kim Min-kyung, Min-soo's sister
- Koo Jun-yup as Lee Young-hee, Tae-seok's roommate

==== People around Hong Ji-yoon ====
- Choi Jong-won as Ji-yoon's paternal aunt's husband
- Oh Mi-yeon as Ji-yoon's paternal aunt
- Lee Ah-hyun as Yoon Ae, Ji-yoon's paternal aunt's elder daughter
- Im Seo-yeon as Yoon Kyung, Ji-yoon's paternal aunt's younger daughter

==== People around Yoo Dong-hwa ====
- Jeong Wook as Dong-hwa's father
- Park Jung-soo as Dong-hwa's mother

==== Others ====
- Kim Yoon-sung as Oh Tae-sung
- Han Sang-jin as Ji-yoon's friend
- Kim Hee-jung as Chief of Public Relations Office
- Jang Ho-jun
- Min Jeong-seop

== Production ==
The original title was "Loving You". As a result, the theme song of the MBC drama Romance (2002) was changed in a hurry because "Loving You" appeared in one passage.

Song Hye-kyo was planned to appear in this series but she rejected, citing that it was not polite to appear in this series which had the same time slot as MBC drama Ruler of Your Own World (2002) which she rejected. Initially, Ryoo Seung-bum was planned to star in this series, but when he considered filming problems, Park Jung-chul replaced him. Coincidentally, Park Jung-chul was Song Hye-kyo's costar in Hotelier and the project Age of Innocence may be their reunion project; Song will later work with Ryoo Seung-bum in Sunlight Pours Down and Han Eun-jung in Full House.
