= Gu Bon-seung =

South Korean actor and singer

- 구본승
- Born: September 11, 1973 (age 53); Gangnam District, Seoul, South Korea
- Occupations: Actor; singer
- Years active: 1994–present

Korean name
- Hangul: 구본승
- Hanja: 具本承
- RR: Gu Bonseung
- MR: Ku Ponsŭng

Gu Bon-seung (born September 11, 1973) is a South Korean actor and singer.

== Filmography ==
=== Film ===
Year	Title	Role
2001	What Should I Do?, I Like You	
2002	Sex of Magic	Park Sung-bin

=== Television series ===
Year	Title	Role	Network
1994	General Hospital	Han Dong-min	MBC
1995	Making Men	Na Min-soo	KBS2
1996	Yes Sir	cameo	KBS2
1997	Love and Separation	Lee Soo	MBC
1997	Ready, Go!	cameo	MBC
1998	Love	Lee Suk-woo	MBC
1998	Winners	Lee Sung-shik	SBS
1999	Jump	Choi Bon-seung	MBC
2000	More Than Words Can Say	Kang Tae-soo	KBS1
2000	Female Secretary	Choi Soo-min	KBS2
2001	Cool	Kang Ji-hoon	KBS2
2001	Like Father, Unlike Son	Suh Jung-yon	KBS2
2004	Drama City: A Distorted Fairytale		KBS2
2006	End of Love	Yoon Suk-jae	MBC
2008	Strongest Chil Woo	cameo	KBS2
2012	To My Beloved	Do Han-soo	JTBC
2017	Teacher Oh Soon-nam	Kang Doo-mool	MBC

=== Television shows ===
Year	Title	Role	Notes	Ref.
2021, 2023	Walking in the Village	Cast Member	Season 2 and 4	
