= Money Game (TV series) =

2020 South Korean television series

- Promotional poster
- Hangul: 머니게임
- RR: Meonigeim
- MR: Mŏnigeim
- Genre: Drama; Finance
- Created by: Studio Dragon
- Written by: Lee Young-mi
- Directed by: Kim Sang-ho
- Starring: Go Soo; Lee Sung-min; Shim Eun-kyung
- Country of origin: South Korea
- Original language: Korean
- No. of episodes: 16

Production
- Running time: 70 minutes
- Production company: JS Pictures

Original release
- Network: tvN
- Release: January 15 – March 5, 2020

Money Game (Korean: 머니게임) is a 2020 South Korean television series starring Go Soo, Lee Sung-min and Shim Eun-kyung. It aired on tvN from January 15 to March 5, 2020 every Wednesday and Thursday at 21:30.

== Synopsis ==
As the South Korean government fears that the 1997 Asian financial crisis is about to repeat itself, three people working at the Financial Services Commission and the Ministry of Economy and Finance try their best to avoid the coming crisis.

== Cast ==
=== Main ===
- Go Soo as Chae Yi-hun
- Lee Sung-min as Heo Jae
- Shim Eun-kyung as Lee Hye-joon

=== Supporting ===
- Choi Deok-moon as Gook Kyeong-min
- Choi Woong as Han Sang-min
- Choi Byung-mo as Na Joon-pyo
- Jo Jae-ryong as Jo Hee-bong
- Oh Ryoong as Park Soo-jong
- Teo Yoo as Eugene Han
- Aprilann as Tina Bahama
- Amy Aleha as Shannon
- Bang Eun-hee as Lee Man-ok
- Kim Jung-pal as Jin Soo-ho
- Mi Ram as Jin Ma-ri
- Song Jae-ryong as Kang Nam-jin
- Kim Seung-wook as Kang Won-hee
- Jung Dong-hwan as Chae Byeong-hak
- Jeon Moo-song as Elder Kwak
- Yoo Seung-mok as Seo Wang-yeo (ep. #5)
- Park Ji-il as Kim Ho-joong

== Production ==
- First script reading was held and filming began in summer 2019.
- This series marked Shim Eun-kyung's small-screen comeback after 5 years since Naeil's Cantabile.

== Viewership ==
Money Game : South Korea viewers per episode (thousands)

Season	Episode number																Average
Season	1	2	3	4	5	6	7	8	9	10	11	12	13	14	15	16	Average
1	774	425	414	320	480	428	493	315	440	419	445	N/A	479	N/A	444	414	N/A

Source: Audience measurement performed nationwide by Nielsen Korea.

Average TV viewership ratings
Ep.	Original broadcast date	Average audience share (Nielsen Korea)	
Ep.	Original broadcast date	Nationwide	Seoul
1	January 15, 2020	3.520%	3.843%
2	January 16, 2020	1.953%	2.433%
3	January 22, 2020	1.850%	1.775%
4	January 23, 2020	1.293%	1.236%
5	January 29, 2020	2.202%	2.065%
6	January 30, 2020	1.693%	1.621%
7	February 5, 2020	2.187%	2.072%
8	February 6, 2020	1.599%	—N/a
9	February 12, 2020	2.064%	2.054%
10	February 13, 2020	1.709%	1.683%
11	February 19, 2020	2.051%	—N/a
12	February 20, 2020	1.361%	—N/a
13	February 26, 2020	2.167%	—N/a
14	February 27, 2020	1.762%	—N/a
15	March 4, 2020	2.146%	2.053%
16	March 5, 2020	1.890%	—N/a
Average		1.966%	— (Note: Due to some ratings not recorded, the exact average rating is unknown.)
In the table above, the blue numbers represent the lowest ratings and the red numbers represent the highest ratings.; N/A denotes that the rating is not known.; This drama aired on a cable channel/pay TV which normally has a relatively smaller audience compared to free-to-air TV/public broadcasters (KBS, SBS, MBC and EBS).
