= The Wedding Scheme =

2012 South Korean television series

- Promotional poster
- Also known as: The Marriage Plot
- Genre: Romance; Comedy; Drama; Family
- Written by: Park Hyeong-jin
- Directed by: Lee Min-woo
- Starring: Kang Hye-jung; Lee Kyu-han; Lee Young-eun; Park Min-ji
- Country of origin: South Korea
- Original language: Korean
- No. of seasons: 1
- No. of episodes: 16

Production
- Production location: Korea
- Production company: Snowball Entertainment (formerly JaU Entertainment)

Original release
- Network: tvN
- Release: April 2 – May 22, 2012

The Wedding Scheme (Korean: 결혼의 꼼수; RR: Gyeolhonui kkomsu) is a 2012 South Korean television series starring Kang Hye-jung and Lee Kyu-han. It aired on tvN from April 2 to May 22, 2012, on Mondays and Tuesdays at 23:00 for 16 episodes.

== Synopsis ==
The widowed president of a kimchi factory decides to embark on a grand marriage scheme for her four daughters... by having them cohabitate with four eligible bachelors.

== Cast ==
- Kang Hye-jung as Yoo Gun-hee

Gun-hee, a 32-year-old career woman with no interest in marrying is the second of four daughters whose mother runs a boarding house. She's ambitious, selfish, competitive, independent, the epitome of the "gold miss" — single and lovin' it.

- Lee Kyu-han as Lee Kang-jae

A 32-year-old chaebol son to a food corporation president who happens to be one of Mom's lodgers. He's got some smarts and skills, but he refuses to do anything he doesn't want to do. A pampered rich boy, even if he really is a big softie underneath the sly exterior.

- Cha Hwa-yeon as So Doo-ryun

Matriarch and president of the small but prestigious Chinjung Kimchi company.

- Yoon Joo-sang as Lee Hak-goon

CEO of food corporation Sangcharim, and father of Kang-jae.

- Lee Young-eun as Yoo Sun-hee

Sun-hee, the sweet and maternal 33-year-old unni ("older sister") who raised her sisters after Dad died and Mom had to work to keep them afloat. Because of that, she has a bit of complex about not having lived her own life.

- Lee Min-woo as Seo Jang-won

35-year-old Jang-won, another boarder. Jang-won is a divorced stunt director, and painful memories are why he keeps love at arm's length.

- Kim Se-jung as Yoo Min-jung

24-year-old Min-jung, a fun-loving, vivacious material girl who loves designer clothes and men with money.

- Seo Jae-kyung as Kim Soon-dol

A 30-year-old club-hopping, rap-loving city man whose looks totally contradict his personality. He likes Min-jung, but she's pretty picky about looks... until she finds out that he's the only son to a rich real estate businessman in the States.

- Park Min-ji as Yoo Min-ji

The 21-year-old youngest daughter who's a cynical old soul, wise beyond her years. She doesn't have a romantic partner yet, but she does have a crush on Jang-won. Her interest in the stunt director stems from her own dream to be a film director. For that reason, she goes around with a camcorder in order to shoot a family movie and sticks her nose into everybody's business.

- Kim Jae-deuk as Park Se-won

A 24-year-old playboy partier who spends money freely and gets into accidents left and right. He ends up moving into the boarding home when his troublemaking ways get him kicked out of home.

- Kim Won-jun as Park Soo-ho
- Jung Seung-ho as Jang Duk-pal
- Kim Ik-tae as Director Park
- Park Ga-won as Lee Ha-na
