= The Royal Tailor =

2014 South Korean film by Lee Won-suk

- Theatrical release poster
- Hangul: 상의원
- RR: Sanguiwon
- MR: Sangŭiwŏn
- Directed by: Lee Won-suk
- Written by: Lee Byoung-hak
- Produced by: Kim Su-jin; Yun In-beom
- Starring: Han Suk-kyu; Go Soo; Park Shin-hye; Yoo Yeon-seok; Ma Dong-seok
- Cinematography: Kim Ji-yong
- Edited by: Nam Na-yeong
- Music by: Mowg
- Production companies: Bidangil Pictures; Waw Pictures
- Distributed by: Showbox
- Release date: December 24, 2014
- Running time: 127 minutes
- Country: South Korea
- Language: Korean
- Budget: US$10 million
- Box office: US$50.4 million

The Royal Tailor (Korean: 상의원; RR: Sanguiwon) is a 2014 South Korean period romance film directed by Lee Won-suk, and starring Han Suk-kyu, Go Soo, Park Shin-hye and Yoo Yeon-seok. It tells the story of a rivalry between two tailors at the Sanguiwon (where the attire worn by royalty was made during the Joseon era) and how it plunges the court into scandal and tragedy. The film was released in South Korea on December 24, 2014.

== Plot ==
The film starts with a modern-day press conference, in which Jo Dol-seok is introduced as the only royal tailor, who single-handedly revolutionized the fashion of Korea's Joseon dynasty. Before one of his works is shown, the scene changes to the kingdom of Joseon, where a different story is told: Jo Dol-seok has tailored clothes for three generations of kings before finally becoming the head of the Sanguiwon, the department responsible for the royal attire. Jo was born a commoner, and looks forward to upgrading his social status after serving the royal family for thirty years. Careful to use the traditional rules and patterns, Dol-seok denies the Queen's request when she asks him to replace the king's robe that was accidentally burnt by a kungnyŏ (female attendant). He insists that to do so would be against court customs, but also simply impossible in the short time before the robe is needed. Anxious to cover her mistake, the Queen looks for a designer elsewhere. She is introduced to Lee Gong-jin, a young designer whose good looks and expertise at making unconventional hanboks have charmed many women in the capital. He invented the bell-shaped design of hanboks and introduced new colors. Gong-jin falls in love with the Queen at first sight and uses his extraordinary gift as a tailor to save the dress. He subsequently becomes a tailor at the Sanguiwon and begins a prosperous career. He repeatedly uses his craft to support the Queen, who is at risk of being dethroned and replaced because she and the King - who never visits her - have no children.

Soon Dol-seok becomes jealous of the young designer's talent, whose creativeness he cannot rival with his use of the traditional shapes. He fears his own position will be undermined. He lets the King use him to frame Gong-jin for attempting to assassinate the King. The King then tries to lay the blame on the Queen for inciting the young tailor, but Gong-jin saves the Queen by claiming he acted on his own motives. Even when the young designer awaits his execution, the head tailor vows to have his name erased from history. Only when Gong-jin is dead, not only the queen, but eventually also Dol-seok silently mourn his death.

At the end of the film, women of Joseon are seen wearing Gong-jin's bell-shaped, merrily colored hanboks. In the last shot, Gong-jin's design of the queen's royal ceremonial dress is shown at the modern press conference, but as was hinted in the first scene, it is wrongly attributed to Jo Dol-seok.

== Cast ==
- Han Suk-kyu as Jo Dol-seok
  - Jo Hyeon-do as young Dol-seok
- Go Soo as Lee Gong-jin
- Park Shin-hye as Queen Jeongseong
- Yoo Yeon-seok as Yeongjo of Joseon
- Ma Dong-seok as Pan-soo
- Shin So-yul as Wol-hyang
- Lee Yu-bi as Royal concubine So-ui
- Jo Dal-hwan as Dae-gil
- Bae Sung-woo as Je-jo
- Heo Sung-tae as Officer Jong
- Kim Jae-hwa as Court Lady Jimil
- Jung Sang-chul as the Chief State Councillor
- Park Kyung-keun as an officer
- Park So-dam as Yoo-wol
- Woo Do-im as Hong-ok
- Lee Do-yeon as Court lady Hong
- Yang Eun-yong as Lady of the First Rank
- Kwon Bang-hyun as Nurse Court Lady
- Kang Ji-won as Madam Kim
- Kim Hye-hwa as Madam Lee
- Choi Hee-jin as Madam Park
- Han Ji-eun as Courtesan 1 in Chwihyangru
- Han Se-in as Courtesan 4 in Chwihyangru
- Lee Da-hae as Courtesan 8 in Chwihyangru
- Jeon So-ni as Tailor woman 1
- Hwang In-moo as a gatekeeper
- Kim Nam-woo as eunuch 1

=== Cameo ===
- Park Gun-hyung as a nobleman in Chwihyangru
- Park Byung-eun as Gyeongjong of Joseon
- Park Yeong-gyu as yangban twins

== Production ==
Filming began on February 21, 2014 and wrapped on July 2, 2014.

More than 1,000 hanbok appear in the film, with actress Park Shin-hye wearing 30 intricately embroidered pieces. ₩1 billion (US$909,000) was spent on costumes, a significant portion of the film's ₩7.2 billion total budget. Costume designer Jo Sang-gyeong said she was inspired by the clothing during King Yeongjo's reign (1694–1776), which according to historical records was when a short jeogori, the jacket that sits on top of the dress, and jar-shaped skirts started to become fashionable.

== Awards and nominations ==
Year	Award	Category	Recipient	Result
2015	17th Udine Far East Film Festival	Audience Award - Second Place	The Royal Tailor	Won
2015	17th Udine Far East Film Festival	My Movie Audience Award	The Royal Tailor	Won
2015	51st Baeksang Arts Awards	Best Supporting Actor (Film)	Yoo Yeon-seok	Nominated
2015	51st Baeksang Arts Awards	Most Popular Actress (Film)	Park Shin-hye	Won
2015	24th Buil Film Awards	Best Art Direction	Chae Kyung-sun	Nominated
2015	52nd Grand Bell Awards	Best Supporting Actor	Yoo Yeon-seok	Nominated
2015	52nd Grand Bell Awards	Best Cinematography	Kim Ji-yong	Nominated
2015	52nd Grand Bell Awards	Best Art Direction	Chae Kyung-sun	Won
2015	52nd Grand Bell Awards	Best Lighting	Jo Kyu-young	Nominated
2015	52nd Grand Bell Awards	Best Costume Design	Jo Sang-gyeong	Won
2015	52nd Grand Bell Awards	Best Sound Recording	Choi Tae-young	Nominated
