= Some (film) =

- Film poster
- Hangul: 썸
- RR: Sseom
- MR: Ssŏm
- Directed by: Chang Yoon-hyun
- Written by: Kim Eun-shil; Kim Eun-jung
- Produced by: Kim Hye-suk
- Starring: Go Soo; Song Ji-hyo
- Cinematography: Kim Seong-bak
- Edited by: Nam Na-yeong
- Music by: Jo Yeong-wook
- Release date: October 15, 2004 (South Korea)
- Running time: 119 minutes
- Country: South Korea
- Language: Korean

Some (Korean: 썸) is a 2004 South Korean crime thriller film directed by Chang Yoon-hyun.

== Plot ==
The film is about a rookie cop who teams up with a female reporter to investigate drug trafficking and police corruption.

== Cast ==
- Go Soo as Kang Seong-ju
- Song Ji-hyo as Seo Yu-jin
- Lee Dong-kyu as Min Jae-il
- Kang Shin-il as Chief Oh
- Kang Sung-jin as Officer Lee
- Jo Kyeong-hun as Officer Chu
- Jeong Myeong-jun as Chief Kim
- Park Cheol-ho as Kwon Cheol-woo
- Kwon Min as Jong Chan
- Jo Mun-hong as Black King
- Kim Jae-in
- Lee Yu-jeong
- Kim Hye-jin
- Kim Ki-hwan as member of organization
