= Lucid Dream (film) =

- Theatrical poster
- Hangul: 루시드 드림
- RR: Rusideu deurim
- MR: Rusidŭ tŭrim
- Directed by: Kim Joon-sung
- Written by: Kim Joon-sung
- Produced by: Hong Yong-su, Choi Sun-Joong
- Starring: Go Soo; Sul Kyung-gu; Park Yoo-chun; Kang Hye-jung
- Cinematography: Park Hyun-Chul
- Edited by: Kim Sang-bum; Kim Jae-bum
- Music by: Jo Yeong-wook
- Production company: Rod Pictures
- Distributed by: Next Entertainment World (South Korea); Netflix (worldwide)
- Release date: February 22, 2017
- Running time: 101 minutes
- Country: South Korea
- Language: Korean
- Budget: US$5 million
- Box office: US$676,598

Lucid Dream (Korean: 루시드 드림; RR: Rusideu deurim) is a 2017 South Korean science fiction mystery-thriller film written and directed by Kim Joon-sung (in his directorial debut). The film was released theatrically in South Korea on February 22, 2017. Netflix acquired the film for distribution in all other countries, premiering it on June 2, 2017.

== Synopsis ==
Dae-ho is a young investigative journalist and single father who has made a few enemies by exposing several corrupt politicians and businessmen. One day, his son is abducted but no ransom is demanded. Dae-ho is convinced it is an act of revenge by one of his enemies who he exposed.

Three years pass and there is no development in the case. Dae-ho then learns of a new form of therapy that allows mental patients to relive important memories through lucid dreams. One of the physicians who administer the therapy is Dae-ho's old friend, So-hyeon.

Together, they explore Dae-ho's memories of that fateful day and find a new trail in his lucid dream. Detective Song, who was responsible for the case three years ago, decides to help Dae-ho and So-hyeon uncover new evidence.

When they uncover the prime suspect of the abduction, it turns out that he has been in a coma. Dae-ho then tracks down a mysterious teenager who keeps appearing in all his dreams. This teenager has invented a way to enter the dreams of others. Dae-ho enters the dream of the prime suspect and learns the truth.

== Cast ==
- Go Soo as Choi Dae-ho
- Sul Kyung-gu as Chief Detective Song Bang-seop
- Park Yoo-chun as This Man / Kwon Yong-hyun
- Kang Hye-jung as So-hyun
- Park In-hwan as Kang Sung-pil
- Chun Ho-jin as Jo Myung-chul
- Jeon Seok-ho as Choi Kyung-hwan
- Lee Suk as Yoo Sang-man
- Lee Si-a as Choi Mi-yeon
- Kim Kang-hoon as Choi Min-woo
- Choi Dae-hoon as Detective Kim
- Park Jin-woo as Owner of Matna Burger Restaurant
- Jo Sun-mook as Photographer
- Lee Chang-jik as Has-been gangster
- Kwon Oh-jin as Has-been gangster
- Heo Sung-min as Big guy
- Hwang Sang-kyung as Male reporter
- Nam Sang-ji as Nurse at Song Soo-jin's clinic
- Lee Eun-joo as Female doctor at Song Soo-jin's clinic
- Kim Mi-sung as Nun director
- Lim Hwa-young as Choi Kyung-hwan's wife
- Noh Hee-soo as Song Soo-jin (Song Bang-seop's daughter)
- Kim Hye-won as Hyo-jung (Choi Dae-ho's wife)
- Kim Sun-bin as Ahn Sang-joon
- Kwon Hae-hyo as Director Park (cameo)
- Lee Jun-hyeok as Joo Noh-geun (cameo)

== Production ==
When writing Lucid Dream, Kim Joon-sung was inspired by the 2010 science fiction film Inception and his own experiences with lucid dreaming.

When asked what drew him to the production, lead actor Go Soo stated, "I enjoyed its lightweight feel, like reading a sci-fi novel...But I got nervous and had sweaty hands after reading through it. So I told the director that I wanted in although I was not that good at acting." Go Soo gained 10 kg, and later lost more than 18 kg, in order to physically portray the state of his character before and after he loses his son.

Principal photography began on April 6, 2015. Filming concluded on June 29, 2015 in front of Namhae Catholic Church in Gyeongju, Gyeongsangbuk Province, South Korea.

== Release ==
The film was originally scheduled for release in the fall of 2016. However, it was widely reported that the film was delayed due to the sexual assault and rape allegations that surfaced in June 2016 against actor and K-pop star Park Yoo-chun. A staff member of the production confirmed this, saying, "We had to wait until Park was free from the charge and reschedule the date." However, Kim Joon-sung denied this, stating, "It took longer than expected to complete the film because it has lots of computer graphics, which delayed the release." When asked why none of Yoo-chun's scenes were cut in the wake of the controversy, Joon-sung said, "I didn't because his is a character who provides the decisive clue in the story." Lucid Dream was released theatrically in South Korea on February 22, 2017, distributed by Next Entertainment World.

Prior to the film's theatrical release, the American entertainment company Netflix acquired the rights to distribute Lucid Dream worldwide. Vice President of Communications for Netflix Asia, Jessica Lee, said, "We are looking forward to 'Lucid Dream' becoming a movie that'll receive great love from audiences all around the world through Netflix". On June 2, 2017, Netflix branded Lucid Dream as a "Netflix Original" and released the film on its digital streaming platform in 190 Netflix-serviced countries.

== Reception ==
The film grossed $676,598 USD on a $5 million USD budget and was a box office bomb in South Korea.

Critic Min-Ji Jin of Korea JoongAng Daily wrote that, "Despite the original subject and star-studded cast, the science fiction thriller 'Lucid Dream'...fails to make full use of either." Jin said the plot and characterization were weak, believed the twist ending was forced, and compared the film unfavorably to Inception.

In a review for the Yonhap News Agency titled "Unsalvageable mediocrity," critic Sun-ah Shim wrote, "At face value...it could have been an engaging film, replete with drama, action and paternal love. Instead, it is a mediocre fare that makes for tedious viewing with a distinct lack of suspense." Shim thought, "The film crumbles mainly because of its wholly predictable and loose plot," adding that it, "recycles parts of dramatic devices from Hollywood blockbuster 'Inception'." Shim also disapproved of Park Yoo-chun's performance and believed that the film gave hints about its central mystery too early. In addition, like Jin, he thought the twist was forced. However, Shim gave positive nods towards the film's visual effects and Go Soo's performance.
