= Eight Days, Assassination Attempts against King Jeongjo =

2007 South Korean television series

- Also known as: Eight Days Mystery of Jeongjo Assassination
- Hangul: 정조암살미스터리 8일
- Hanja: 正祖暗殺미스터리 8日
- Lit.: Jeongjo Assassination Mystery 8 Days
- RR: Jeongjo amsal miseuteori 8il
- MR: Chŏngjo amsal misŭt'ŏri 8il
- Genre: Period drama Drama
- Based on: Journey by Oh Se-yeong
- Written by: Kim Won-seok
- Directed by: Park Jong-won
- Starring: Kim Sang-joong; Park Jung-chul; Jung Ae-ri; Lee Seon-ho; Hee Won
- Country of origin: South Korea
- Original language: Korean
- No. of episodes: 10

Production
- Executive producer: Han Chang-hoon
- Producers: Go Jang-won; Kim Do-yeon; Ahn Sang-hwi; Lee Joo-hyung
- Running time: Saturdays and Sundays at 23:00 (KST)

Original release
- Network: CJ CGV
- Release: November 17 – December 16, 2007

Eight Days, Assassination Attempts against King Jeongjo (Korean: 정조암살미스터리 8일; lit. 'Jeongjo Assassination Mystery 8 Days') is a South Korean television miniseries starring Kim Sang-joong, Park Jung-chul, Jung Ae-ri, Lee Seon-ho, and Hee Won. The series ran for 10 episodes, and was aired by CGV from November 17, 2007 to December 16, 2007. This show is placed in the context of the eight days procession organized in 1795 by King Jeongjo of Joseon to visit the tomb of his father at Hwaseong Fortress. This historic event was a huge one, involving 5,661 people and 1,417 horses.

== Synopsis ==
The screenplay is based on the novel Journey (Korean: 원행; RR: Wonhaeng; lit. 'a round trip') written in 2006 by Oh Se-yeong. The background of the action is the 1795 procession organized by King Jeongjo of Joseon for the 60th birthday of his mother, Lady Hyegyŏng that also commemorated the 60th birthday of his deceased father, the Crown Prince Sado. During the eight days period when the Court left the palace for the ceremony, the show introduces several assassination attempts against the King. A first one comes from the Moon In-bang's group (a millenarist sect). But this plot is used by the Noron Faction to pursue its own agenda, attempting an armed suppression against the Sipa Faction and the King as well.

Apart from the fictional elements, a major focus is placed on two historical sources. The Memoirs of Lady Hyegyŏng is extensively used during many flashback sequences relative to events that occurred before the death (1762) of Crown Prince Sado, while the official documents from the Joseon Royal Library are used for the current events: the "Wonhaeng Eulmyo Jeongni Uigwe" (Eulmyo=1795) for the procession itself, and the "Hwaseong Seongyeokuigwe" concerning the Hwaseong Fortress as a whole.

This series is often referred as Eight Days, Mystery of Jeong Jo Assassination, a misleading translation since King Jeongjo won the 1795 confrontation and only died in 1800.

== Documents about the real-life 1795 procession ==
The main document of the 1795 procession is an eight-panel screen, the Hwaseonghaenghaengdo Byeongpun. Nowadays, three copies of this screen exists: a sepia one, a blue one and a colored one, the King's copy. This last copy can be seen at Samsung Museum of Art Leeum and has been designated as Korean National Treasure 1430 in 2005-04-15.

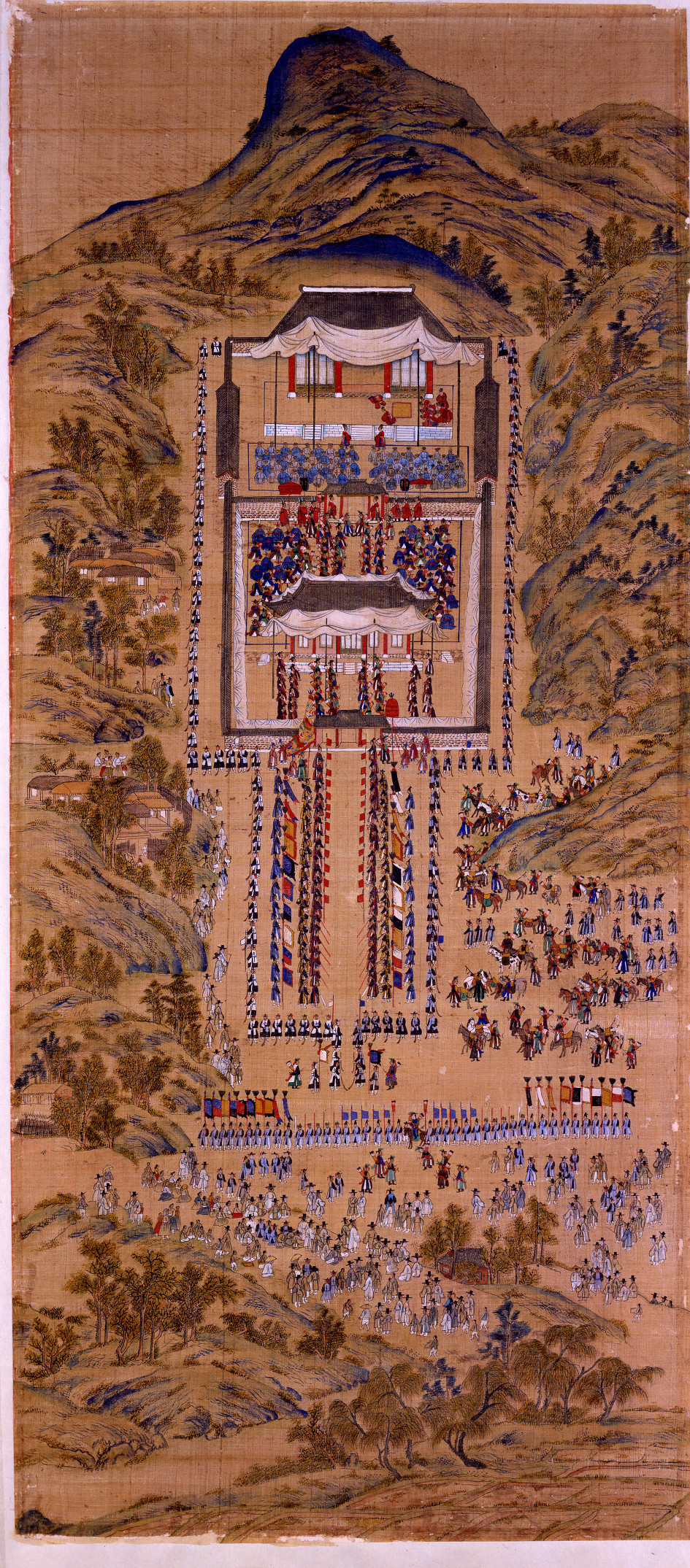
Tombs
화성성묘전배

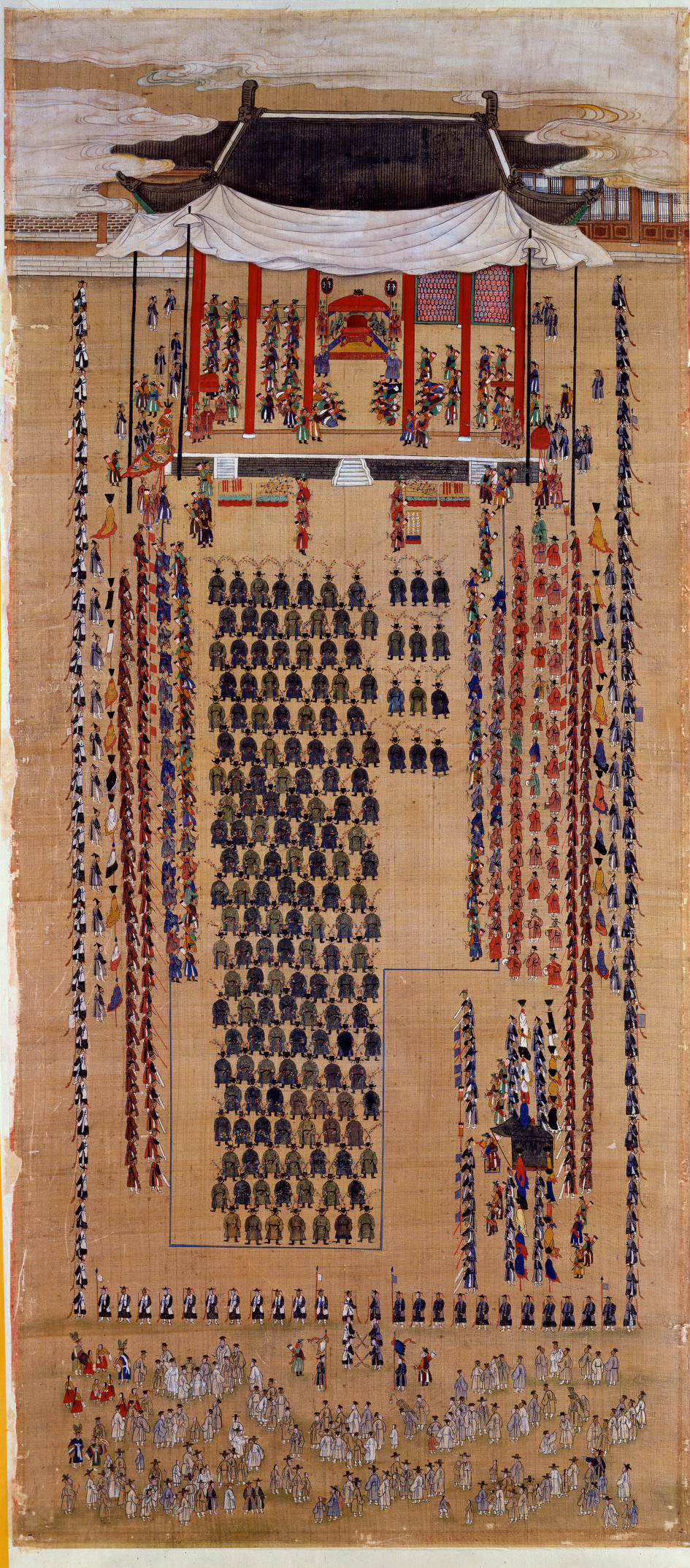
Examinations
낙남헌방방

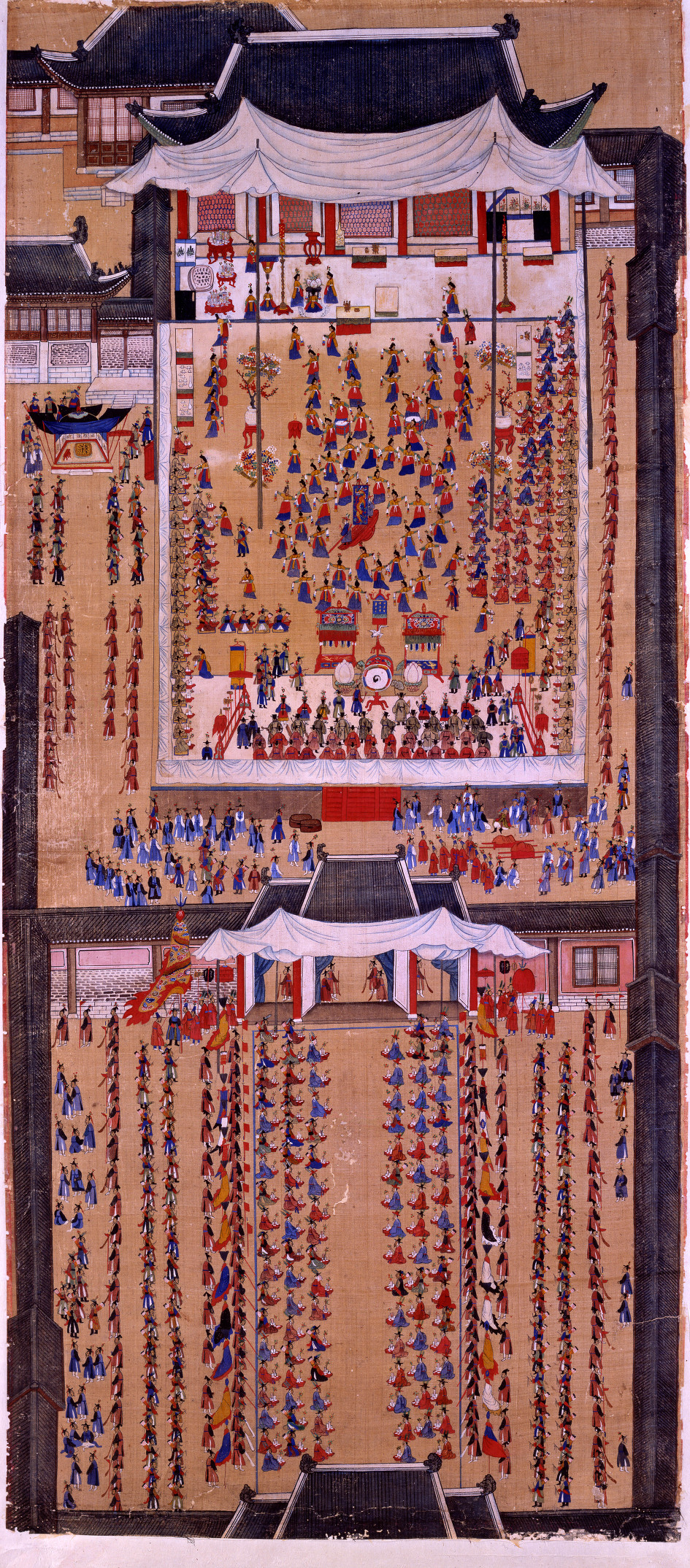
Banquet
봉수당진찬

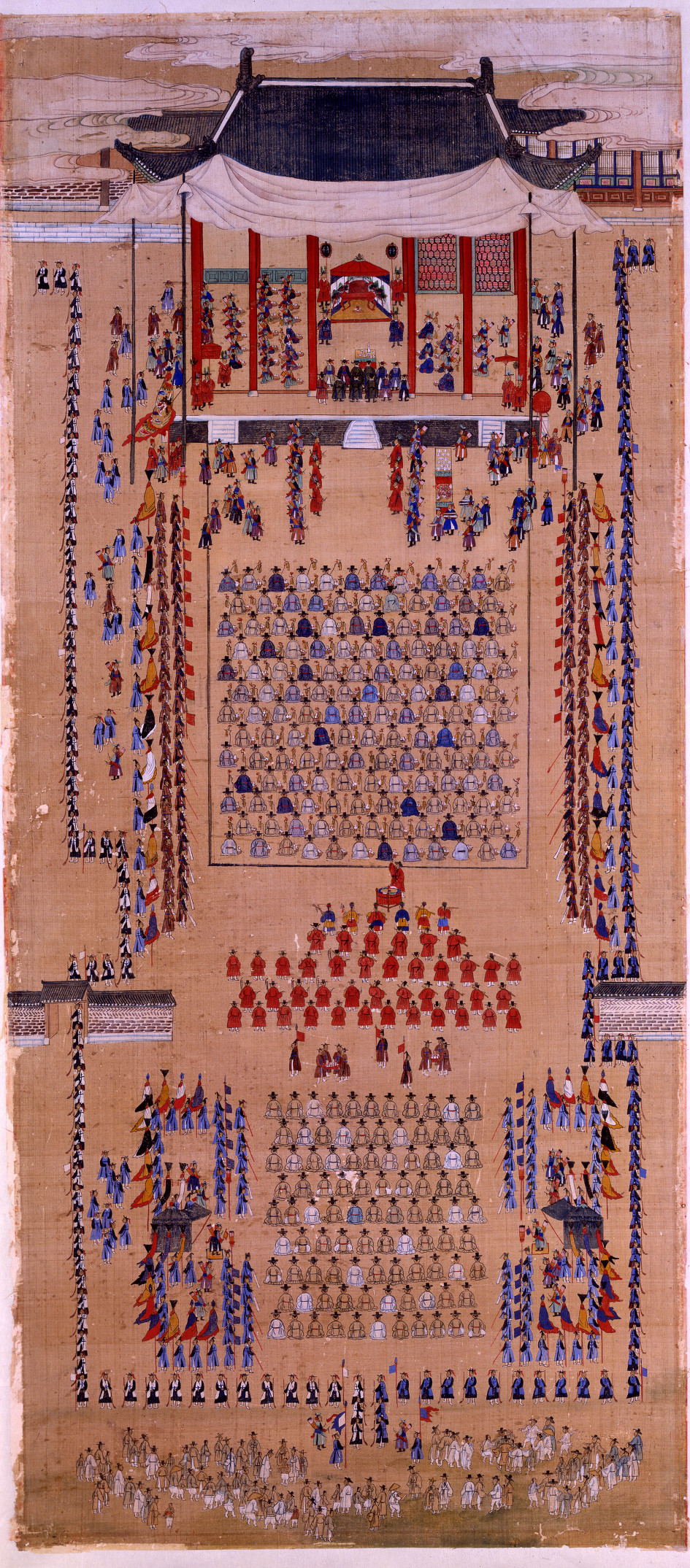
Elders
낙남헌양로연

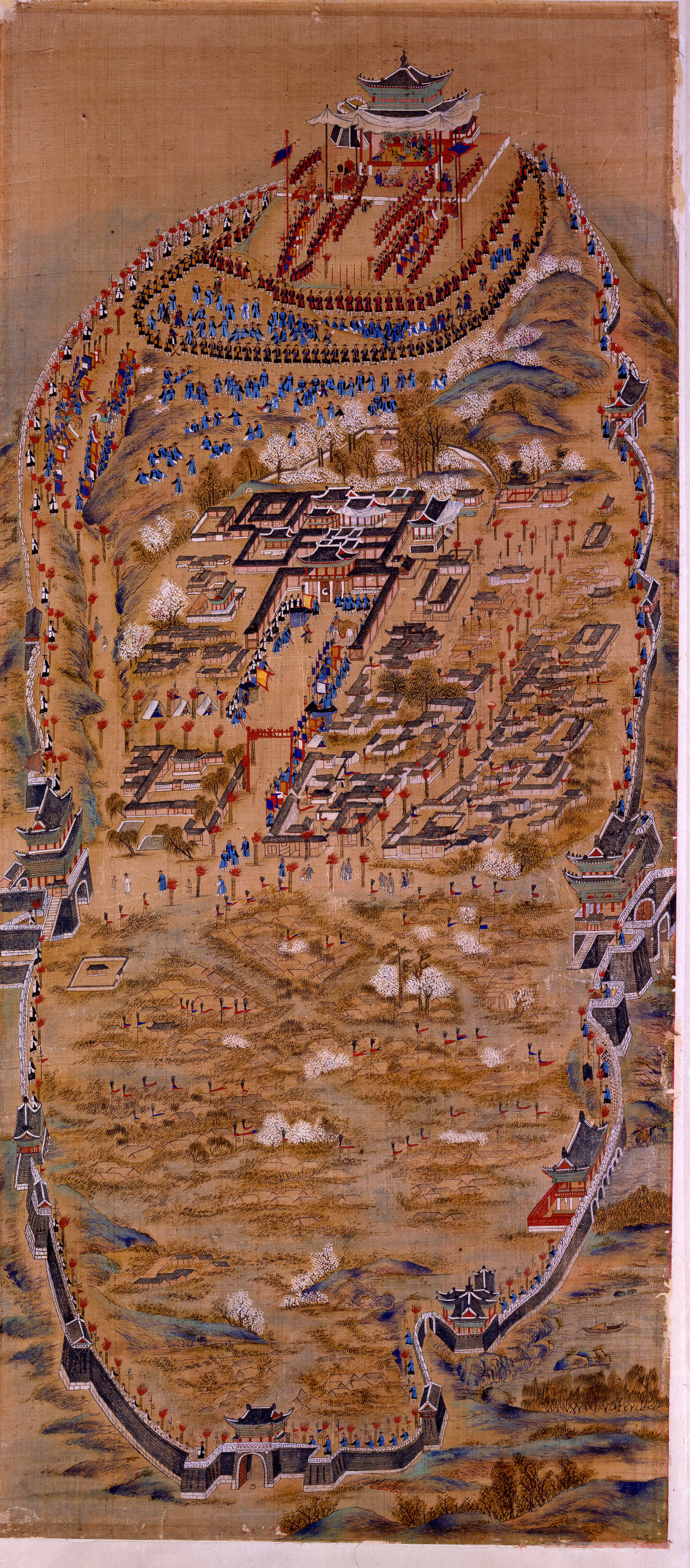
Seojangdae
서장대야조

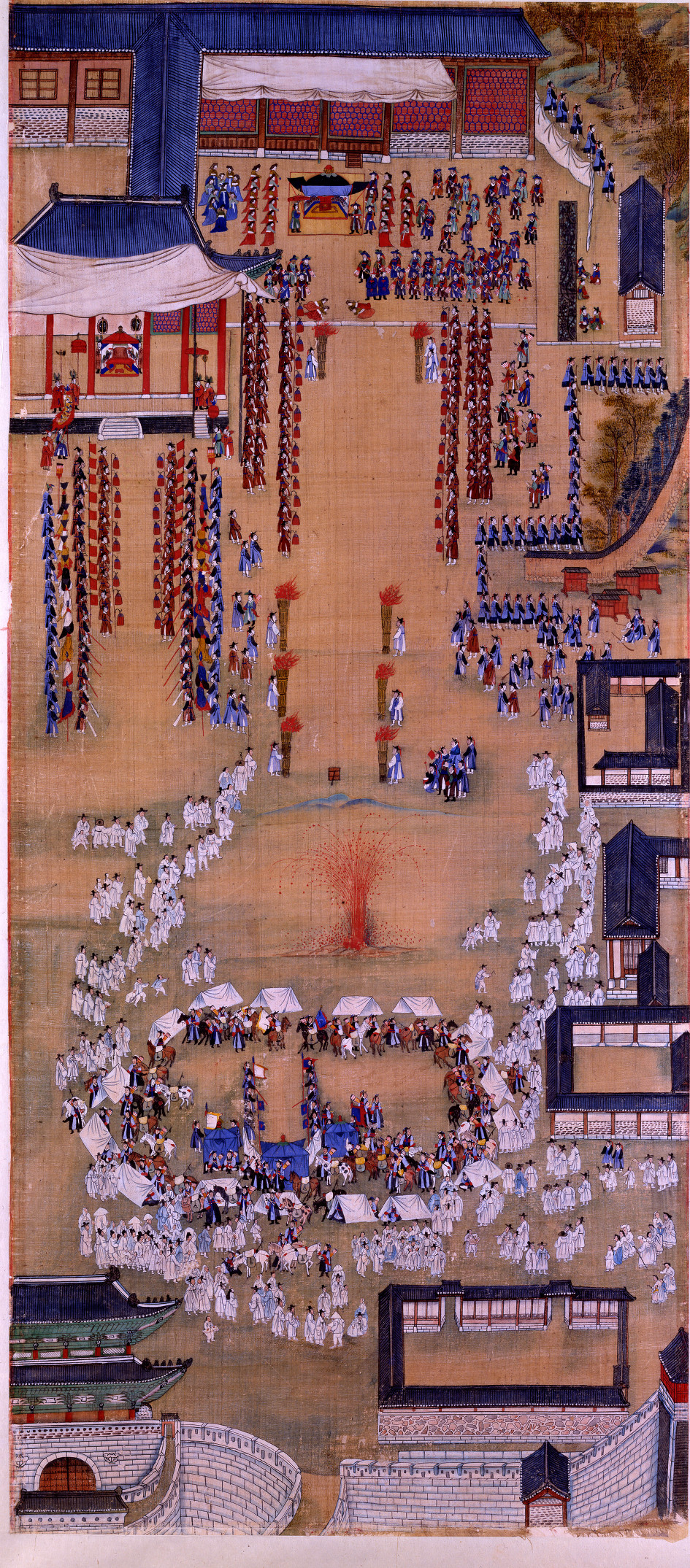
Arrows
득중정어사

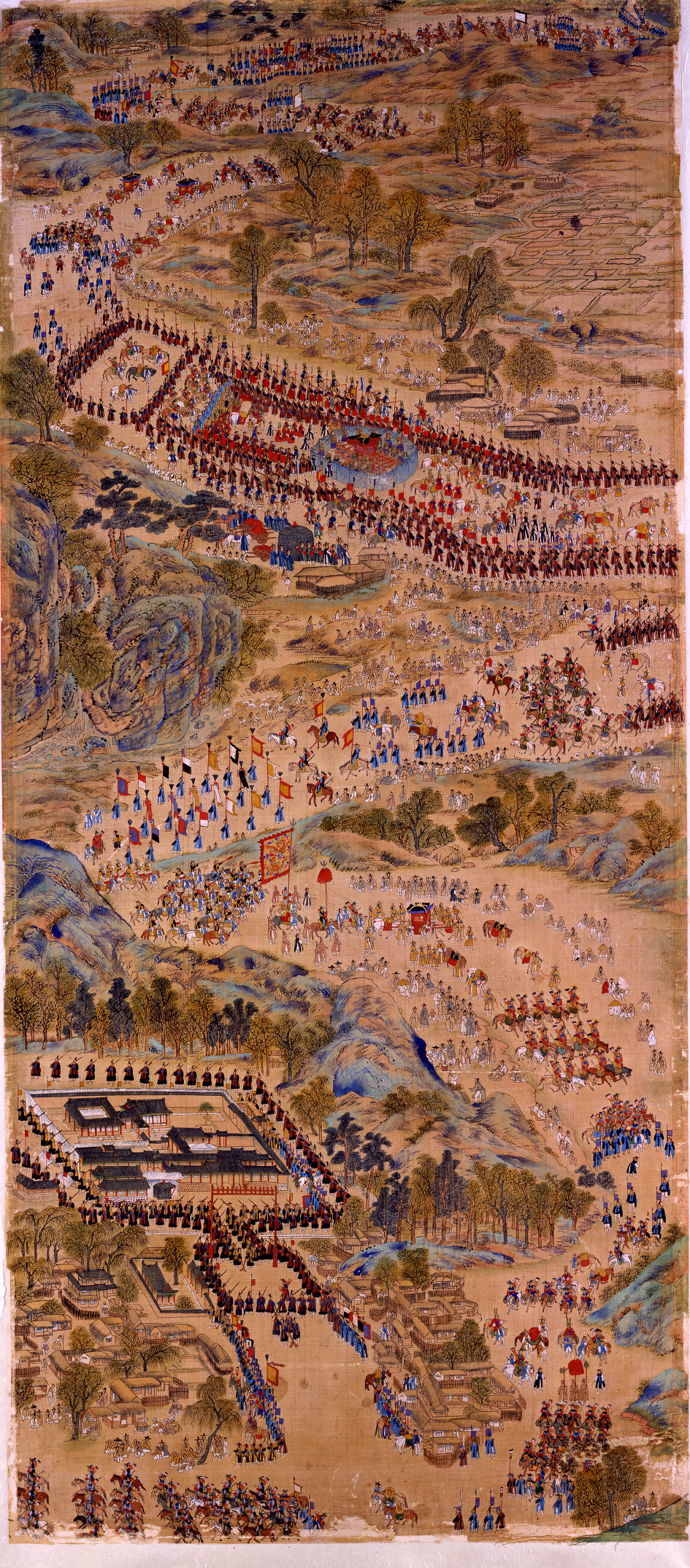
Procession
환어행렬

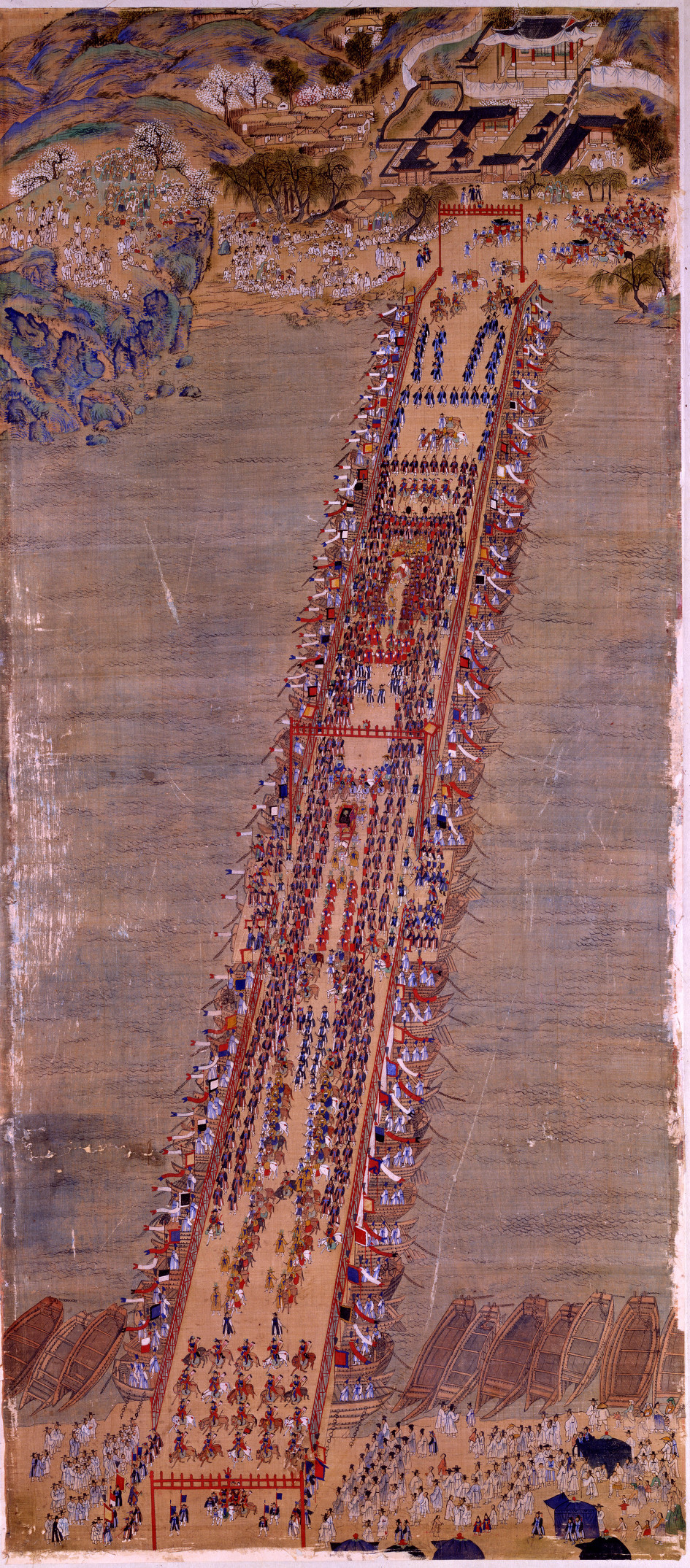
Bridge
한강주교환어

The Hwaseonghaenghaengdo Byeongpun

Map of the Hwaseong Fortress in the 1800 Uigwe.

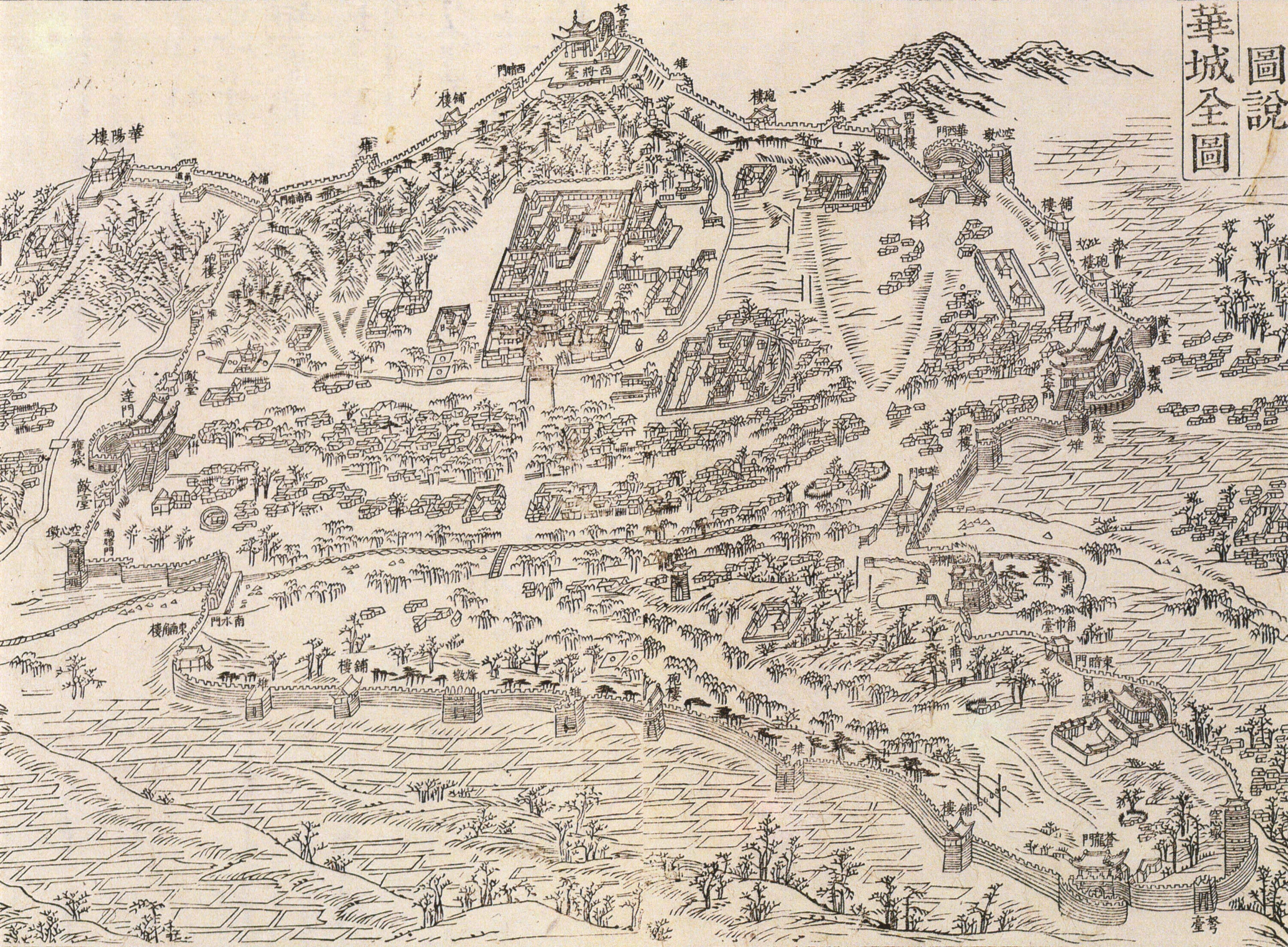
Hwaseong Jeondo

== Cast and characters ==
As described in the credits of the last episode, the drama involves the following characters:

.	cast	hg	character	hg	real-life	notes
01	Kim Sang-joong	김상중	Jeongjo	정조	1752–1800	King Jeongjo, the central character of the drama (r. 1776–1800).
02	Park Jung-chul	박정철	Jeong Yakyong	정약용	1762–1836	Silhak philosopher, coordinator of the Sipa, pen name Dasan.
03	Jung Ae-ri	정애리	Lady Hyegyeong	혜경궁	1735–1815	Consort of Prince Sado, mother of King Jeongjo. Hyebin. Daughter of Hong Bonghan.
04	Lee Seon-ho	이선호	Jang Inhyeong	장인형		Gichong Jang: recruited by Mun Inbang, as comrade Jang 장 동지.
05	Hee Won	희원	So Hyangbi	소향비		This lady with the nice hat, lover of Jang Inhyeong.
06	Park Chan-hwan	박찬환	Sim Hwanji	심환지	1730–1802	Minister of War, head of Noron faction.
07	Lee Dae-yeon	이대연	Mun Inbang	문인방		Rising Sun's ringleader. Moniker= Okpo Seonsaeng 옥포.
08	Jang Gi-yong	장기용	Hong Jaecheon	홍재천		Head of Daedong merchants, born Sangpil: recruited by Mun Inbang, as comrade Hong 홍 동지.
09	Park Su-hyeon	박수현	Choi Gisu	최기수		Gichong Choi, the King's bodyguard.
10	Jo Dal-hwan	조달환	Kim Chundeuk	춘득		Officer of the Royal Guards, bodyguard of Jeong Yakyong.
11	Kim Tae-hoon	김태훈	Kim Hanju	김한주		Nephew of Queen Dowager Jeongsun, link between Jeongsun and the Noron faction.
12	Kim Seong-gyeom	김성겸	Yeongjo	영조	1694–1776	Former King (r. 1724–1776).
13	Park Ung	박웅	Chae Jegong	채제공	1720–1799	Sipa leader, presented as Chef State Concilior.
14	Kim Gi-hyeon	김기현	Kim Jeongsu	김정수		Former leader of the Noron faction.
15	Kim Hui-jong	김희종	Queen Jeongsun	정순왕후	1745–1805	Jeongsun Wanghu of the Gyeongju Kim clan, Yeongjo's widow, Queen Dowager Jeongsun.
16	Jo Han-jun	조한준	Crown Prince Sado	사도 세자	1735–1762	2nd son of Yeongjo (from Yeongbin), late Prince Regent Jangheon 장헌세자, father of Jeongjo.
17	Yi Yong-hwan	이용환	Gu Myeongrok	구명록		Hidden son of Gu Seonbok, attending trainer of the Hunlyeondogam.
18	Hong Seung-il	홍승일	Jeong Han-gi	정한기		.
19	Jeong Yong-u	정용우	Hong Byeongsin	홍병신		Assistant Section Chief of the Ministry of War. E05, 09:50.
20	Na Jae-gyun	나재균	Hong Inhan	홍인안	1722–1776	1775 Left State Councilor: brother of Hong Bonghan.
21	Heo Gi-ho	허기호	Hong Bonghan	홍봉한	1713–1778	Father of Lady Hyegyeong, grandfather of Jeongjo.
22	Choe Geong-u	최겅우	Yi Gyeongmu	이경무		Ogunyeong: Hunlyeondogam commander.
23	Yi Yong-jin	이용진	Jo Simtae	조심태		Suwon Governor.
24	Kim Seong-il	김성일	Dong Jung-seo	동중서		Lord of Penghu.
25	Han Cheol-woo	한철우	Jang Son-yi	장손이		The sharpshooter.
26	Jeong Yong-ju	정용주	Jang Son-san	장손산		The specialist of underwater operations.
27	Song Yeong-jin	송영진	Hong Sanggung	홍상궁		.
28	Yi Ung-jae	이웅재	Hong Suyeong	홍수영	1755–1798	Oldest son of Hong Nakin. Recipient of the 1795 Memoir.
29	Hong Ae-bin	홍애빈	Princess Hwawan	화완옹주	1737–1808	Princess Hwawan, 3rd daughter of Yeongjo and Sado's mother.
30	Won Jong-seon	원종선	Sim Yiji	심이지		Ogunyeong: Sueo-sa daejang (commander).
31	Yi Hyeong-ju	이형주	Yi Hanpung	이한풍		Ogunyeong: Eoyeong-sa daejang (commander).
32	Park Yong-jin	박용진	Yi Myeongsik	이명식		Commissioner (Jejo) of the Royal Guards .
33	Oh Chang-gyeong	오창경	Yi Yugyeong	이유경		Jo Simtae's Deputy.
34	Park Jong-cheol	박종철	Yu Eonho	유언호		Member of the Noron faction.
35	Kim Geon-ho	김건호	Yun Si-dong	윤시둥	1729–1797	1795 Minister of the Right. (U-changseong·우찬성 ???).
36	Choe Min-seo	최민서	Sin Daehyeon	신대현		Ogunyeong: Chong-yung-sa commander.
37	Kim Yang-u	김양우	Gu Seonbok	구선복		1762 accusator of CP Sado: general executed E01.
38	Sin Dong-hun	신동훈	Mak-soe	막쇠		The cheokseodan pedler.
39	Kim Seung-hun	김승훈	Daedong gibsa	대동 집사		Daedong attendant.
40	Yi Jae-ug	이재욱	Bae Jeong-tae	배정태		.
41	No Ig-hyeon	노익현	Han Jang-bok	한장복		The Daedong spy at Hwaseong Fortress.
42	Jeong Na-on	정나온	Young jumo	젊은 주모		Tavern keeper.
43	O Seo-yeon	오서연	Han Mae	한매		.
44	Seol Ji-yun	설지윤	Cheongyeon Princess	청연공주	1754–1821	First daughter of Prince Sado and Lady Heongyeong.
45	Park Gun-woo	박긴태	Jeongjo (child)	어린 정조		Yi San, the Royal Successor, to become King Jeongjo.
46	Yun Yeong-min	윤영민	Jeong Bok	정복		The King's Eunuch, brother of Jeong Hugyeom.
47	Seok Myeong-sik	석명식	Hanju gimsa	한주 집사		Kim Hanju attendant.
48	Yang Jeong-hyeon	양정현	munjung (adult)	문중어른		.
49	Yi Dong-yeon	이동연	Hong Suyeong (child)	어린 수영		Hong Suyeong (child).
50	Kim Jin-hui	김진희	Hyegyeong (child)	어린 혜경		Hyegyeong (child).
51	Oh Hyeon-sil	오현실	Hyegyeong sanggung	혜경 상궁		Lady-in-waiting of Lady Hyegyeong.
52	Sin Gyeong-seon	신경선	Jeongjo sanggung	정조 산궁		Lady-in-waiting of King Jeongjo.
53	Byun Yang-ho		Seo Yubang	서유방		Gyeonggi Governor, secretly helping the Noron faction
54	Son Yeong-gwon	손영권	Jeong Hu-gyeom	정후겸	1750–1776	Hwawan-ongju's adopted son
55	Han Hyeok-ju	한혁주	Kim Gwiju	김귀주	1740–1786	Queen Jeongsun's brother

- When provided, birth and death years are given according to the real life of the character.

== Artistic license ==
- The Memoirs of Lady Hyegyŏng are in fact a collection of four different documents, written at different times, for different audiences. The description of the controversial behavior of Crown Prince Sado occurs in the 1805 Memoir, ten years after the procession, and not in the 1795 Memoir.
- Mun Inbang 문인방 is described as linked to a peasant uprising in 1786 (byeongo 병오). In Jeongjo Sillok, the first mention of Mun Inbang is 1782-04-04 and his trial is 1782-11-20 under various charges, propagating Jeonggamnok among them. Thereafter, Mun Inbang's name is only used to imply guilt by association, not to describe a prison escapee.
- Hong Bonghan is described in the series as a Noron leader during both reigns of Yeongjo and Jeongjo, but he rather appears as a key Sipa in the Haboush's translation of the Memoirs.
- In the real Court, the red robe was for the highest ranks, the blue for the intermediate ranks, and green for the lowest ranks. In the series, the blue dress is the uniform of the villains, while the red dress is the uniform of the "good ones". This helps the viewer to identify who's who, but this can also be a POV-시파 joke from the screenwriter.

== Bibliography ==
- Oh, Seyeong (2006). Journey. 제목:원행; 저자:오세영; 출판사:예담. Yedam (Wisdom House). p. 315. ISBN 9788-9591-3167-9. (in Korean)
- Chevalier, Henri (1898). Cérémonial de l'achèvement des travaux de Hoa Syeng (Corée) 1800. Toung Pao (in French). Vol. 9. E. J. Brill. pp. 384–396.
- Doo Won Cho (2010). The Korean fortress City Suwon: History; Conservation Heritage; Documentation "Hwaseong Seongyeok Uigwe"; National and International Relations (in German). University of Bamberg, Inaugural Dissertation. Archived from the original on 2017-08-13., 727 pages.
- Haboush, JaHyun Kim (1996). The Memoirs of Lady Hyegyong: The Autobiographical Writings of a Crown Princess of Eighteenth-Century Korea. University of California Press. ISBN 978-0520200555., 329 pages.
- 1782-04-04 Sillok 정조 6년 (1782) 04월 04일 계축 3:포청에서 인심을 선동한 백천식 등의 공초를 가지고 아뢰다 [About Baek Cheon-sik, who instigated the people at Pocheonge]. 정조실록 (Jeongjo Sillok). Annals of the Joseon Dynasty.
- 1782-11-20 Sillok 정조 6년 (1782) 11월 20일 계축 1:문인방 등의 죄인을 국문하여 역모사건에 대해 알아내다 [Mun In-bang and other sinners interrogated in a treason case]. 정조실록 (Jeongjo Sillok). Annals of the Joseon Dynasty. Archived from the original on 2023-08-20.
- Official Web Site of the Hwaseong Fortress
- UNESCO Hwaseong Fortress Site Archived 2018-12-26 at the Wayback Machine
