= Lee Seon-ho =

South Korean actor

- Born: December 14, 1981 (age 44); South Korea
- Occupation: Actor
- Agent: Studio Santa Claus Entertainment

Korean name
- Hangul: 이선호
- RR: I Seonho
- MR: I Sŏnho

Lee Seon-ho (Korean: 이선호; born December 14, 1981) is a South Korean actor.

== Filmography ==
=== Television series ===
Year	Title	Role	Network
2002	Pokémon	Lee Seon-ho	SBS; Tooniverse
2005	Let's Go To The Beach		SBS
2006	The Snow Queen	Kim Jung-kyu	KBS2
2007	Drama City "Fine-tooth Comb"		KBS2
2007	Air City		MBC
2007	Eight Days, Assassination Attempts against King Jeongjo	Jang Inhyeong	Channel CGV
2009	Tamra, the Island	Yan Kawamura	MBC
2010	More Charming by the Day	Lee Seon-ho	MBC
2010	Dong Yi	Yeong-jo (Special appearance)	MBC
2010	Marry Me, Mary!	Lee An	KBS2
2011	Midas	Yoon Gi-wook	SBS
2011	Servant, The Untold Story of Bang-ja	Bang-ja	Channel CGV
2011	Saving Mrs. Go Bong-shil		TV Chosun
2013	You Are the Best!	Choi Yeon-ah fellow actor (cameo)	KBS2
2015	My Mother Is a Daughter-in-law	Joo Kyeong-min	SBS
2016	The Doctors	Jung Pa-ran	SBS
2016	Golden Pouch	Yoon Joon-sang	MBC
2023	Woman in a Veil	Seo Tae-yang	KBS2

=== Film ===
Year	Title	Role
2009	Yoga	(cameo)
2010	Dreams Come True	Northern soldier
2011	Pitch High	Father
2013	Playboy Bong	Assistant director
2014	Melo	Tae-in
2016	Night Song	Seung-woo
2017	Coffee Mate	Won-yeong
