= Herb (film) =

- Hangul: 허브
- RR: Heobeu
- MR: Hŏbŭ
- Directed by: Heo In-moo
- Written by: Heo In-moo; Jeong Seo-won; Kim Geun-cheol; Lee Jae-yoon; Park Mi-yeong; Sin Yeon-joo; Son Hyeon-hee
- Produced by: Park Moo-seung
- Starring: Kang Hye-jung; Bae Jong-ok; Jung Kyung-ho
- Cinematography: Yoon Hong-shik
- Edited by: Kwon Hyo-rim
- Music by: Jo Seong-woo
- Distributed by: Showbox
- Release date: January 11, 2007 (South Korea)
- Running time: 113 minutes
- Country: South Korea
- Language: Korean
- Budget: $3,000,000
- Box office: $7,903,158

Herb (Korean: 허브) is a 2007 South Korean drama film, directed by Heo In-moo. Kang Hye-jung stars in the lead role as a 20-year-old woman with the mental and emotional skills of a seven-year-old, who falls in love with a policeman (Jung Kyung-ho) she sees as her Prince Charming, but must face tragedy when she is forced to deal with certain realities about herself and those around her.

== Plot ==
Sang-eun is a pretty 20-year-old girl, that is warm hearted and possess an extraordinary gift for folding paper into various figures. She has a loving mom and friends, but she is also mentally challenged. She has the intelligence of a 7 years old. Sang-Eun learns everything slowly, but there are still a lot of things she does not know about. She is fixated with the idea that she will meet the prince of her dreams, like in the fairy tales she so often reads.

One day Sang-Eun meets a traffic officer, that she believes may be the prince of her dreams. The traffic officer is named Jong Bum and he has a strong penchant for beautiful woman. He mistakenly believes Sang-Eun to be a lawyer and approachers her. Once Jong Bum realizes that she is mentally challenged he leaves.

Sang-Eun returns home only to find her mom crying. Her mom has just returned from a hospital appointment. Sang-Eun, while she places things into boxes and wraps by year, is now worried that her mom may soon go away like her friend's grandmother did.

== Cast ==
- Kang Hye-jung as Sang-eun
- Bae Jong-ok as Sang-eun's mother
- Jung Kyung-ho as Jong-bom
- Lee Mi-young as Mi-ja
- Lee Won-jong
- Lee Young-yoo as Young-ran
- Woo Seung-yeon
