= Empire of Gold =

2013 South Korean television series

- Promotional poster
- Also known as: Golden Empire
- Genre: Period drama Political drama Romance
- Written by: Park Kyung-soo
- Directed by: Jo Nam-kook
- Starring: Go Soo; Lee Yo-won; Son Hyun-joo
- Music by: Park Se-jun
- Country of origin: South Korea
- Original language: Korean
- No. of episodes: 24

Production
- Executive producer: Lee Hyun-Jik
- Producers: Kim Jin-geun; Lee Young-jun
- Production location: Korea
- Running time: 60 minutes on Mondays and Tuesdays at 21:55 (KST)
- Production companies: The Story Works; Drama House

Original release
- Network: SBS TV
- Release: 1 July – 17 September 2013

Empire of Gold (Korean: 황금의 제국; Hanja: 黃金의 帝國; RR: Hwanggeumui jeguk) is a 2013 South Korean television series starring Go Soo, Lee Yo-won, and Son Hyun-joo. It aired on SBS TV from July 1 to September 17, 2013 on Mondays and Tuesdays at 21:55 for 24 episodes.

== Plot ==
The series is a multi-generational saga that covers a twenty-year span from 1990 to 2010, and follows one chaebol family as it arises out of the ruins of the 1990s IMF financial crisis that wreaked havoc on the South Korean economy, becoming one of the top conglomerates in the nation. Three people become locked in a power struggle for control of this chaebol empire.

== Cast ==
- Go Soo as Jang Tae-joo

Jang Tae-joo comes from nothing, and his ambition is fuelled after witnessing the misfortunes of his poor hardworking father. After their father dies, Tae-joo, along with his mother, raises his little sister Hee-joo on his own, and fights tooth and nail to rise to the top relying on his cunning wits. Smart, passionate, and driven, he endures contempt and humiliation as he works relentlessly towards his dreams of success and wealth. But betrayal and exploitation gradually turn him into a cold-hearted, ruthless mogule. He marries Seo-yoon, although he loves Seol-hee.

- Lee Yo-won as Choi Seo-yoon

The reserved, aloof and second youngest daughter of the chaebol founder and heiress to the business empire, she and Tae-joo get married, although they both don't love each other.

- Son Hyun-joo as Choi Min-jae

Seo-yoon's cousin and Tae-joo's biggest rival for Sungjin Group's top seat. Choi Min-jae is as ruthless, cunning, and unscrupulous as Tae-joo, lobbying, bribing and arranging backdoor deals with the political elite.

- Jang Shin-young as Yoon Seol-hee

A woman who uses her looks to garner insider information, sets up a real estate consulting firm to sell what she knows. Even though it's a dangerous job, she teams up with Tae-joo to take down the Choi family and their business empire. She falls in love with Tae-joo.

- Ryu Seung-soo as Jo Pil-doo

A mob boss who is the antagonist to Jang Tae-joo's start-up business, and becomes a friend of Tae-joo later.

- Park Geun-hyung as Choi Dong-seong

The patriarch and CEO of giant conglomerate Sungjin Group.

- Yoon Seung-ah as Jang Hee-joo

Tae-joo's younger sister.

- Lee Hyun-jin as Choi Seong-jae

The youngest son of Sungjin Group, whose dream is to become an economist. His family runs the Sungjin Economic Research Institute, where he works.

- Sunwoo Eun-sook as Yoo Soon-ok

Tae-joo's mother who took care of her children after her husband died.

- Nam Il-woo as Jang Bong-ho

Tae-joo's father who died in an antiquated building blast without achieving financial blessing.

- Kim Mi-sook as Han Jeong-hee
- Jung Han-yong as Choi Dong-jin
- Um Hyo-sup as Choi Won-jae
- Ko Eun-mi as Park Eun-jung
- Shin Dong-mi as Choi Jeong-yoon
- Jeong Wook as Sohn Dong-hwi
- Kim Jeong-hak as Shin Jong-ho
- Kim Kang-hyeon as Na Chun-ho
- Lee Won-jae as Kim Kwang-se
- Choi Yong-min as Park Jin-tae
- Park Ji-il as Kang Ho-yeon
- Jin Seo-yeon as Jeong Yu-jin
- Kwon Tae-won as Jeong Byeong-guk
- Dong Ha as Choi Yong-jae

== Ratings ==
Episode #	Original broadcast date	Average audience share			
Episode #	Original broadcast date	TNmS Ratings		AGB Nielsen	
Episode #	Original broadcast date	Nationwide	Seoul National Capital Area	Nationwide	Seoul National Capital Area
1	1 July 2013	8.0%	9.7%	8.5%	9.2%
2	2 July 2013	8.2%	9.7%	9.0%	9.9%
3	8 July 2013	7.5%	8.2%	9.3%	10.0%
4	9 July 2013	8.1%	9.2%	9.2%	10.2%
5	15 July 2013	8.2%	10.3%	9.5%	11.4%
6	16 July 2013	8.7%	10.2%	9.7%	11.5%
7	22 July 2013	9.7%	11.8%	10.1%	10.8%
8	23 July 2013	9.4%	11.5%	10.7%	11.9%
9	29 July 2013	9.5%	10.0%	10.4%	11.4%
10	30 July 2013	10.1%	11.2%	10.2%	12.0%
11	5 August 2013	10.3%	12.4%	9.8%	10.9%
12	6 August 2013	10.5%	13.6%	11.0%	12.3%
13	12 August 2013	8.8%	10.3%	10.0%	11.9%
14	13 August 2013	10.8%	13.6%	11.2%	13.2%
15	19 August 2013	8.8%	11.3%	10.7%	12.5%
16	20 August 2013	10.3%	12.9%	11.7%	13.8%
17	26 August 2013	8.5%	11.0%	11.2%	12.9%
18	27 August 2013	8.5%	11.0%	11.4%	13.3%
19	2 September 2013	7.8%	9.8%	11.4%	13.7%
20	3 September 2013	6.8%	8.2%	10.6%	13.1%
21	9 September 2013	7.4%	7.9%	10.8%	12.3%
22	10 September 2013	7.4%	8.4%	11.2%	13.0%
23	16 September 2013	7.7%	9.6%	10.3%	12.6%
24	17 September 2013	8.1%	9.7%	9.7%	11.2%
Average		8.7%	10.5%	10.3%	11.9%

== Awards and nominations ==
Year	Award	Category	Recipient	Result
2013	Korea Drama Awards	Top Excellence Award, Actress	Lee Yo-won	Nominated
2013	APAN Star Awards	Top Excellence Award, Actor	Go Soo	Nominated
2013	APAN Star Awards	Acting Award, Actress	Jang Shin-young	Nominated
2013	SBS Drama Awards	Top Excellence Award, Actor in a Drama Special	Go Soo	Nominated
2013	SBS Drama Awards	Top Excellence Award, Actress in a Drama Special	Lee Yo-won	Won
2013	SBS Drama Awards	Special Award, Actor in a Drama Special	Park Geun-hyung	Nominated
2013	SBS Drama Awards	Special Award, Actor in a Drama Special	Jung Han-yong	Nominated
2013	SBS Drama Awards	Special Award, Actress in a Drama Special	Kim Mi-sook	Nominated
2013	SBS Drama Awards	Special Award, Actress in a Drama Special	Jang Shin-young	Nominated
2013	SBS Drama Awards	Top 10 Stars	Lee Yo-won	Won
2014	Baeksang Arts Awards	Most Popular Actor (TV)	Go Soo	Nominated
2014	Baeksang Arts Awards	Most Popular Actor (TV)	Son Hyun-joo	Nominated

== International broadcast ==
It began airing in Thailand on digital television MONO29 on May 11, 2015.

It began airing in Vietnam on Let's Viet (VTC9) on September 1, 2014.
