= Kill Me (2009 film) =

- Theatrical poster
- Directed by: Yang Jong-hyun
- Screenplay by: Yang Jong-hyun
- Produced by: Kim Mi-hee
- Starring: Shin Hyun-joon; Kang Hye-jung
- Production company: Sidus Pictures
- Release date: 5 November 2009
- Running time: 107 min
- Country: South Korea
- Language: Korean
- Box office: $317,593

Kill Me (Korean: 킬 미; aka Kiss Me, Kill Me) is a 2009 romantic comedy film from South Korea. It stars Shin Hyun-joon and Kang Hye-jung in the lead roles and is the feature film debut of director Yang Jong-hyun.

== Plot ==
Hyeon-jun, a contract killer, arrives at a house expecting to kill a man but finds that his target is actually Jin-yeong, the woman who hired him. Jin-yeong is attempting to end her own life after a breakup with her boyfriend. Hyeon-jun refuses to carry out the job and instead asks her out on a date.

== Cast ==
- Shin Hyun-joon as Hyeon-jun
- Kang Hye-jung as Jin-yeong
- Kim Hye-ok
- Park Chul-min

== Release ==
At the press preview on 26 October 2009, director Yang Jong-hyun confessed that he "may have tried a little too hard" with his feature debut and was concerned that audiences may not understand or enjoy the film, but also stated that he "thought it'd be fun to mix contrasting images to create something humorous and emotional at the same time". Kang Hye-jung did not attend the event as it coincided with her wedding.

Kill Me was released in South Korea on 5 November 2009 and was shown on 168 screens. It received 50,730 admissions and grossed $317,593. In a review for Yonhap News Agency, Shin Hae-in stated that, "despite its complicated plot line, [Yang's] first feature seems to have a unique spark and sense of humor that allows audiences to overlook its flaws and enjoy the film".
