= Way Back Home (2013 film) =

- Theatrical release poster
- Hangul: 집으로 가는 길
- Lit.: Way Home
- RR: Jibeuro ganeun gil
- MR: Chibŭro kanŭn kil
- Directed by: Bang Eun-jin
- Written by: Yoon Jin-ho
- Produced by: Im Sang-jin; Jang Won-seok; Kang Myeong-chan; Seo Young-hee
- Starring: Jeon Do-yeon; Go Soo
- Cinematography: Lee Mo-gae
- Edited by: Kim Sun-min
- Music by: Kim Jun-seong
- Distributed by: CJ Entertainment
- Release date: 11 December 2013
- Running time: 107 minutes
- Country: South Korea
- Language: Korean
- Box office: $12.8 million

Way Back Home (Korean: 집으로 가는 길; RR: Jibeuro ganeun gil) is a 2013 South Korean drama film starring Jeon Do-yeon and Go Soo, and directed by Bang Eun-jin. It is based on the true story of an ordinary Korean housewife who was imprisoned in Martinique for two years after being wrongfully accused of drug smuggling at a Paris airport.

This is the first time a Korean film was shot in the Caribbean, as well as the first to feature actual guards and prisoners as supporting characters. Filming took place over three weeks at a women's prison in the Dominican Republic.

== Plot ==
Jeong-yeon (Jeon Do-yeon) and Jong-bae (Go Soo) are a happily married couple with a young daughter; they pour their savings into an auto repair shop only to have the rug pulled out from underneath them when a friend of Jong-bae's commits suicide after he is unable to pay his loans. Since Jong-bae acted as his friend's guarantor, the debt now falls onto them. With Jong-bae gradually growing despondent following their financial turmoil, Jeong-yeon makes the hard decision to do a job for a seedy acquaintance. She agrees to deliver diamonds from Paris to Seoul, which she thought would be legal. Jeong-yeon arrives in France, but as soon as she sets foot in Orly Airport she is arrested and police discover more than 30 kilograms (66 pounds) of cocaine in her bag. Being thrown in a French jail is only the beginning of her troubles as legal wranglings and an indifferent Korean embassy in France soon see her shipped off to a penitentiary on the far-flung island of Martinique, a French territory in the Caribbean, where she is jailed for two years without being tried in court. Back in Korea, her husband does his best to get through to the diplomats and secure her passage home.

== Cast ==
- Jeon Do-yeon as Song Jeong-yeon
- Go Soo as Kim Jong-bae
- Ryu Tae-ho as Consul Bang
- Bae Sung-woo as Section chief Chu Dae-yoon
- Kang Ji-woo as Hye-rin
- Joanna Kulig as Yalka
- Corinne Masiero as "Hellboy"
- Lee Dong-hwi as Gwang-sik
- Choi Min-chul as Seo Moon-do
- Heo Joon-seok as Soo-jae
- Park Hyung-soo as Seoul District Prosecutors' Office detective
- Park Yoon-hee as KBC TV reporter Shin Cheol-ho
- Park Ji-il as Police officer Lee Soo
- Lee Do-kyeong as Department head Joo
- Jean-Michel Martial as Martinique judge
- Antoine Blanquefort as Martinique prosecutor
- Hugues Martel as New defense lawyer Olivier Bécourt
- Catherine Baugue as original Martinique defense lawyer
- Park Ji-hwan as Ha Tae-gwang
- Seo Jin-won as Sang-cheol
- Oh Yeon-ah as Lee Soo-ji
- Chae Yoo-hee as Ji-hye
- Dong Hyo-hee as Jong-bae's older sister
- Marie-Philomène Nga as "250 years old"
- Feliné Quezada Figueroa as "Gangster #1"
- Gastner Legerme as Ducos driving prison officer
- Seo Byeong-cheol as Interrogating detective Choi Jo
- Kim Mi-kyung as landlady
- Son Young-joo as YTN newsreader
- Kim Seon-ju as French interpreter
- Pascal Vallet as French plainclothes policeman
- Kim Su-hyeon as Bang's wife
- Lee Sa-bi as KBC TV writer
- Kang Myeong-chan as KBC TV cameraman
- Jang Gwang as Korean ambassador to France (cameo)
- Kim Hae-gon as Deputy driving car owner (cameo)

== Background ==
On 30 October 2004, Jang Mi-jeong was arrested at Orly Airport in France for smuggling a suitcase filled with 17 kilograms (or 37 pounds) of cocaine. Jang said she had no idea what it contained; she had been given a bag by her husband's friend, whom she had known for more than 10 years, and was told it was filled with unpolished gemstones. Jang had agreed to carry the suitcase from Guyana to the Netherlands via France in return for ₩4 million (US$3,740). After getting caught at Orly, Jang was jailed near Paris for three months awaiting trial. Then, after being found guilty, she was sent to a prison in French-administered Martinique in the Caribbean. She finally returned to Korea two years later on 18 November 2006. Her friend was eventually arrested as well and sentenced to serve 10 years in jail. Jang's story was later featured on In Depth 60 Minutes, a KBS investigative-documentary show, in 2006. In 2013, Jang published the book Lost Days, recounting her ordeal and her life after returning from prison, particularly her difficult re-adjustment to Korean society and the ostracism she and her two daughters faced.

The Ministry of Foreign Affairs has been criticized by Jang and the filmmakers for its handling of the incident, citing their "diplomatic negligence" and calling them irresponsible when it comes to protecting Koreans abroad. Foreign Ministry officials have insisted that the story in the movie is not the whole truth.

== Box office ==
Way Back Home was released in theaters on 11 December 2013. The film recorded 610,000 admissions on its opening weekend, placing second in box-office sales. It ended up selling a total of 1,854,702 tickets, with a gross of ₩13,048,981,745.

== Awards and nominations ==
Year	Award	Category	Recipient	Result
2014	5th KOFRA Film Awards	Best Actress	Jeon Do-yeon	Won
2014	9th Max Movie Awards	Best Actress	Jeon Do-yeon	Won
2014	19th Chunsa Film Art Awards	Best Actress	Jeon Do-yeon	Nominated
2014	50th Paeksang Arts Awards	Best Actress	Jeon Do-yeon	Nominated
2014	23rd Buil Film Awards	Best Actress	Jeon Do-yeon	Nominated
2014	51st Grand Bell Awards	Best Actress	Jeon Do-yeon	Nominated
2014	35th Blue Dragon Film Awards	Best Actress	Jeon Do-yeon	Nominated
2014	34th Golden Cinema Festival	Best Actor	Go Soo	Won
