= Woo Seung-yeon =

South Korean model and actress (1983–2009)

- Portrait of Woo
- Born: 24 May 1983
- Died: 27 April 2009 (aged 25); Jamsil, Seoul, South Korea
- Cause of death: Suicide by hanging
- Occupations: Model; actress
- Years active: 2007–2009

Korean name
- Hangul: 우승연
- RR: U Seungyeon
- MR: U Sŭngyŏn

Woo Seung-yeon (Korean: 우승연; 24 May 1983 – 27 April 2009) was a South Korean model and actress.

== Biography ==
=== Career ===
Woo began her career as a fashion model in magazine and television commercials, and had appeared in minor roles in the films Herb (2007) and Private Eye (2009). She had been affiliated with management agency Yedang Entertainment in 2008, but switched to Oracle Entertainment in February 2009. Woo had been undergoing treatment for depression, having been under severe stress following a number of failed auditions. At the time of her death, she was on a leave of absence from Chung-Ang University where she studied French language and literature.

=== Death and legacy ===
On 28 April 2009, Woo died by suicide, she was found hanged at her home in Jamsil-dong, Seoul, in an apparent suicide. Her body was discovered at 7:40 pm by her roommate. Prior to her death, Woo sent a text message to her sister saying "I'm sorry", and left a note in her diary that read, "I love my family. I am so sorry to leave early." Police believe that depression over her situation and fear of the future led to her suicide.

== Filmography ==
Year	Title	Role
2007	Herb	Han-mo's girl
2009	Private Eye	Kae-ddong

== See also ==
- Suicide in South Korea
