= The Tooth and the Nail =

- Theatrical release poster
- Hangul: 석조저택 살인사건
- Hanja: 石造住宅 殺人事件
- RR: Seokjo jeotaek sarin sageon
- MR: Sŏkcho chŏt'aek sarin sakŏn
- Directed by: Kim Hwi; Jung Sik
- Screenplay by: Jung Sik; Lee Jung-ho
- Based on: The Tooth and the Nail by Bill S. Ballinger
- Produced by: Yoon Ji-ho
- Starring: Go Soo; Kim Joo-hyuk
- Cinematography: Yoon Jong-ho
- Edited by: Yang Jin-mo
- Music by: Kim Joon-seok
- Distributed by: CineGuru/Kidari Ent
- Release date: May 9, 2017
- Running time: 109 minutes
- Country: South Korea
- Language: Korean
- Box office: US$2.5 million

The Tooth and the Nail (Korean: 석조저택 살인사건; lit. 'Stone Mansion Murder Case') is a 2017 South Korean suspense thriller film directed by Kim Hwi and Jung Sik. It is based on the novel of the same name by Bill S. Ballinger. The film stars Go Soo and Kim Joo-hyuk; it was Kim's final film released before his death in October 2017.

The film portrays a murder trial through its conclusion, while including in flashbacks showing the past events that led to murder and trial.

== Plot ==
A murder case happens in a stone mansion in Seoul, sometime in the late 1940s after Korea was freed from Japanese colonialism.

Before the case, there is a circus magician named Lee Seok-jin, who was famous nationwide for his extraordinary skills. One day, he met a woman named Jung Ha-yeon, and after saving her from an unpleasant incident, they build up a friendship, which eventually evolved into romance and love. Subsequently, due to her beautiful looks, the circus master recruited Ha-yeon to perform on stage with Seok-jin, who became her partner in every magical performance. Later, both Seok-jin and Ha-yeon married and Ha-yeon became pregnant.

One day on a bus, by chance, Seok-jin saw Ha-yeon on a street passing a letter to a woman. He enquired her what is it, and she said she merely helped a passer-by to pick up a thing. Afterwards, Seok-jin and Ha-yeon went to the capital Seoul on a new contract for further performances. Later, after a performance and while alone in a hotel they lived in, Seok-jin noticed a bag belonging to Ha-yeon was hidden under their bed, and uncovered a rectangular copper plate from the bag, which resembled a tool to make fake cash notes. When Seok-jin asked her about it, Ha-yeon said that during the Japanese colonial period of Korea, a man under the Japanese name Shigeru Okamoto approached her uncle, who was a copper metalsmith, and paid him a huge sum to manufacture the copper plate.

Shortly after Ha-yeon's uncle finished the task, he was killed, presumably by Okamoto for the copper plate, which Ha-yeon found buried under a tree in her house. The Japanese police and Okamoto also repeatedly probed Ha-yeon over the whereabouts of the copper plate, which led to her having to hide it and ran off from these people. Sensing that Ha-yeon's life will still be in danger and she will still be silenced even if she handed over the copper plate to Okamoto, Seok-jin went down wanting to contact Okamoto to stop him from getting near his wife, as he earlier received a letter from Okamoto who ominously stated he will find Ha-yeon. Unfortunately, just as Seok-jin waited for the phone call, Ha-yeon was being pushed to her death by someone, presumably Okamoto.

Grief-stricken over the death of Ha-yeon and his unborn child, Seok-jin turns to alcoholism and abandoned his career as a circus magician. One day, while he was drunk while walking on a street, he stumbles upon a fake bank note which a passer-by littered on the road. Seeing the fake note, Seok-jin slowly became filled with vengeance and decided to avenge Ha-yeon. First, he went after the Japanese police officer who was formerly in charge of investigation Ha-yeon's uncle's murder, and who was still residing in Korea. The Japanese police officer, who was confronted by Seok-jin, managed to subdue him with the help of his subordinates, and asked him his reason to find him. After hearing Seok-jin's story, the policeman, who was about to leave for Japan and who was also being tricked by Okamoto over the fake bank note incident, then gave a description of Okamoto, describing Okamoto, who did not have a photograph, as a Korean man who was fluent in English, Chinese, Japanese and even German, and stated that Okamoto was always together with a woman. Before he leave, he left behind a fully loaded revolver for Seok-jin to kill Okamoto and even scarred him on the lip.

Acting upon the Japanese's tip-off to look for Okamoto in Seoul, where many people used counterfeit bank notes often, Seok-jin changed his name to Choi Seung-man, and changes his appearance by plucking away a chip of his tooth, and became a penniless taxi-driver who always fetch rich customers and businessmen. He also specially place a mat with written German words behind the backseat, as a way to test if the passenger could read it, as well as burning each bank note he received from each passenger to test if the note was counterfeit. This went on for two years, and one night, while Seok-jin was driving a passenger to a brothel, he heard the male passenger telling him what the German words meant and fluently recited them in German; he also found out that the bank note was fake after burning it the moment the man alighted the taxi. Realising that the man could be the mysterious Shigeru Okamoto, Seok-jin secretly entered the brothel and saw him together with the female brothel owner, who turned out to be the same woman he saw together with Ha-yeon on the day before he and Ha-yeon shifted to Seoul.

Under his alias Choi Seung-man, Seok-jin approached the man, and finally, after much begging and pleading, the man hired him as his personal driver; Seok-jin also found out that the man's real name is Nam Do-jin. Seok-jin then spent his days as Do-jin's driver living in Do-jin's stone mansion and secretly watching the man's every move, slowly trying to make a move to execute his revenge plan. One day, Do-jin, who earlier received a phone call looking for him by his Japanese identity, wanted Seok-jin to make a phone call at 10 pm to a number he gave him, wanting him to tell the recipient that he received a copper plate (which was the one used to make fake bank notes) and not to look for him again. The recipient, who was a printer owner involved in making counterfeit bank notes, was later killed by Do-jin after he told Do-jin that the copper plate was in the brothel owner Mdm Sung's possession.

Mdm Sung, who overheard the murder from the phone (as the printer owner had called her prior to Do-jin attacking him), contacted Seok-jin, whom she knew was Ha-yeon's husband. When Seok-jin asked if Mdm Sung was the woman whom the Japanese police officer claimed to be with Do-jin, Mdm Sung laughed and taunted him that Ha-yeon was the woman whom the officer is referring to, and even tauntingly claimed that Ha-yeon was a lover of Do-jin before they separated. Angered at the brothel owner's words, Seok-jin nearly killed her but managed to control himself and went back to Do-jin's mansion with the copper plate and a letter, which Sung claimed was the truth about Ha-yeon. Do-jin later met up with Sung (who had a one-sided crush on him) and killed her and dismembered her after telling her that he killed Ha-yeon to silence her and has never loved her or Sung and failing to receive the copper plate, which could be evidence to prove his crime.

After going back home with Sung's severed head, Do-jin was confronted gunpoint by Seok-jin, who was bent on avenging Ha-yeon's death. After a fight between them which also continued down the basement, Do-jin was knocked unconscious by Seok-jin, whose right finger was cut off by Do-jin using an axe during the fight. Seok-jin was about to shoot Do-jin but after seeing his severed finger, he decided to not shoot Do-jin. He planted fake evidence to make it look like that Do-jin had killed "Choi Seung-man", fired a few gunshots in the house and left behind his finger. Additionally, after reminiscing his past memories of Ha-yeon, Seok-jin burned Sung's severed head in the furnace and the letter given to him by Sung, deciding not to read it; he rather accept the fact that he loved Ha-yeon instead of investigating her true feelings further. Seok-jin fled and went into hiding after tipping off to the police with an anonymous identity that a "murder" had taken place in Do-jin's mansion.

Do-jin was subsequently arrested and charged with the murder of "Choi Seung-man". While Do-jin was on trial, the prosecutor, who investigated and uncovered some evidence of Do-jin's illegal manufacture of counterfeit bank notes, argued in court that Do-jin killed "Seung-man" in order to silence him and prevent him from exposing his illegal deeds, and several witnesses had testified for the prosecution, including medical experts who certified that the fingerprints on the severed finger belonged to "Seung-man", and that the blood type of the bloodstains and body part remnants (Sung's head) were blood type A, which proved that Do-jin killed "Seung-man". However, Do-jin, who knew that he himself was truly innocent, insisted in his defence that he had no motive or reason to kill his driver, and the defence lawyer impeached the statements of all witnesses by stating there is no direct evidence that Do-jin had killed his driver, who was described as a penniless lunatic by witnesses known to Do-jin. This fierce battle went on until a few months later, in light of the circumstantial evidence and arguments from both sides, the judge warned the prosecutor that if he did not provide further new evidence in the final hearing to prove his case against Do-jin, the court would have to acquit Do-jin.

In the next hearing, Seok-jin, dressed in a formal black suit, showed up as a witness, and he told the court that he was indeed the anonymous caller who contacted the police about the murder. Do-jin, who recognised Seok-jin as his driver "Choi Seung-man", pointed out that Seok-jin was Seung-man, and when the defence lawyer asked to see if Seok-jin indeed did not have a right finger, Seok-jin revealed to the court that he did not have a right hand, claiming that he lost it while trying out a new magic trick, which was supported by a medical report and witness statement. Do-jin, enraged beyond words that his story and innocence was not believed, tried to attack Seok-jin but ultimately subdued by the guards.

After Seok-jin gave his story to the court, the prosecutor argued that it was not to be believed that Seok-jin, who was apparent strangers with Do-jin and had no feud against him at all, would pretend to be the "victim" Choi Seung-man, pretend to be dead and come back alive in the trial to further frame Do-jin for "committing" the crime. Seeing that he could not prove that Seok-jin was Choi Seung-man, and knowing that in turn of proving his innocence over his driver's "murder", he would be guilty of the other three murders he committed throughout the film and the manufacturing of fake bank notes, Do-jin was forced to confess that he indeed killed "Seung-man". As a result, Nam Do-jin was found guilty of murder and sentenced to life imprisonment, with no chance of release from prison on parole for good behaviour. He was also set to stand trial for the other crimes he earlier committed on a later date.

Having achieved his goal of revenge, and having finally sought justice for Ha-yeon (and their murdered child), Seok-jin returned to the circus and continued his career as a circus magician and performer, while continuing to love Ha-yeon deeply in his heart and had kept a photo of her and her ring by his side.

== Cast ==
- Go Soo as Lee Seok-jin / Choi Seung-man
- Kim Joo-hyuk as Nam Do-jin / Shigeru Okamoto
- Park Sung-woong as Prosecutor Song Tae-suk
- Moon Sung-keun as Attorney Yoon Young-hwan
- Lim Hwa-young as Jung Ha-yeon
- Park Ji-a as Madam Sung
- Na Ki-soo as Judge
- Kim Jung-heon as Detective Lee Jin-woo
- Yeo Min-joo as Housekeeper Oh Soon-yi
- Han Ji-eun as Cheonhui Hong Se-hee
- Kim Tae-woo as Forensic Doctor Jang Ji-ho
- Oh Kwang-rok as Theater owner
- Kim Tae-hoon as Detective Goo Gwang-seo
- Park Chae-ik as Printer
