= Angel's Revenge (TV series) =

- Promotional poster for Angel's Revenge
- Also known as: Women by Nature; Heavenly Woman; Innate Woman; Sky Angel; Heaven Girl
- Genre: Melodrama; Romance; Revenge; Family
- Developed by: KBS Drama Production (KBS 드라마 제작국)
- Written by: Ahn So-min; Lee Hye-sun
- Directed by: Eo Soo-seon
- Creative directors: Lee Joo-hyung; Hong Kyung-deuk
- Starring: Yoon So-yi; Park Jung-chul; Moon Bo-ryung; Kwon Yul
- Composer: Lee Chang-hee (이창희)
- Country of origin: South Korea
- Original language: Korean
- No. of episodes: 103

Production
- Executive producer: Lee Jae-young
- Producer: Kim Shin-il
- Running time: 40 min
- Production companies: Free Will Company; SSD

Original release
- Network: KBS
- Release: January 6 – June 2, 2014

Angel's Revenge (Korean: 천상여자; RR: Cheonsangyeoja; lit. A Girl by Nature) is a 2014 South Korean daily drama starring Yoon So-yi, Park Jung-chul, Moon Bo-ryung and Kwon Yul. It aired on KBS2 from January 6 to June 2, 2014 for 103 episodes.

== Plot ==
Lee Seon-yoo is training to become a nun. Right before she finally gets her wish, she learns that her beloved older sister Jin-yoo has died. Jin-yoo was betrayed and killed by her lover, Jang Tae-jung. Tae-jung, a smart, good-looking man from a humble background, had committed himself to luring and marrying a tycoon's daughter "against all odds," as part of an effort to get him into the upper class of society.

Seon-yoo then meets Seo Ji-seok, an immature man from a rich family whose sister Ji-hee is married to Tae-jung. Ji-seok is at risk of losing the inherited family business to Tae-jung and Ji-hee, since Ji-seok's mother is the family patriarch's second wife.

To take revenge on the man responsible for her sister's death, Seon-yoo gives up her dream of becoming a nun. She marries Ji-seok, and becomes Tae-jung's sister-in-law. Thus, Seon-yoo begins leading a double life: she pretends to be the ideal wife and daughter-in-law in front of the Seo family, and only takes off her mask in front of Tae-jung, proving she can be just as ruthless and vicious as Tae-jung. Seon-yoo wears her angel wings while hiding the dagger of revenge.

== Cast ==
=== Main ===
- Yoon So-yi as Lee Seon-yoo
- Park Jung-chul as Jang Tae-jung
- Kwon Yul as Seo Ji-seok
- Moon Bo-ryung as Seo Ji-hee

=== Supporting ===
- Lee Se-eun as Lee Jin-yoo
- Lee Dal-hyung as Heo Poong-ho
- Choi Wan-jung as Bong Hwang
- Lee Hye-eun as Bong Chang
- Choi Chung-woo as Hwang Jung-in
- Kim Min-soo as Heo Ki-jin
- Lee Eung-kyung as Na Dal-nyeo
- Jang In-sub as In-seob
- Jung Yi-yeon as Jang Tae-mi
- Jung Young-sook as Gong Jung-soon
- Kim Chung as Woo Ah-ran
- Choi Jae-won as Seo Woo-hyun
- Choi Dong-yub as Section Chief Kim
- Go Bo-gyeol as Jung-in
- Kim Hae-rim as Ahn-na
- Goo Jae-yee as Park Chae-rin
- Yoon Seo-jin as Jung Hee-joo
