= Park Jung-chul =

South Korean actor

- Born: Park Chul; November 5, 1976 (age 49); Seoul, South Korea
- Education: Chung-Ang University - Theater; Chung-Ang University Graduate School of Performing Arts
- Occupation: Actor
- Years active: 1997–present
- Agent: Polaris Entertainment
- Spouse: Unknown (m. 2014)

Korean name
- Hangul: 박철
- RR: Bak Cheol
- MR: Pak Ch'ŏl

Stage name
- Hangul: 박정철
- RR: Bak Jeongcheol
- MR: Pak Chŏngch'ŏl

Park Jung-chul (Korean: 박정철; born November 5, 1976), birth name Park Chul, is a South Korean actor. Park made his acting debut in 1997 through a talent search by the KBS network, and has since starred in the romantic comedy film Oh! Happy Day (2003) and television dramas such as Legend (2001), Present (2002), Remember (2002), Blue Fish (2007), Eight Days, Assassination Attempts against King Jeongjo (2007), War of Money: The Original (2008), My Lady (2008), Wife Returns (2009), Gwanggaeto, The Great Conqueror (2011), and Angel's Revenge (2014). He has also been a cast member of the reality show Law of the Jungle since 2012.

== Personal life ==
Park married his girlfriend of six years, a flight attendant, on April 12, 2014 at the Grand InterContinental Seoul Parnas.

== Filmography ==
=== Television series ===
Year	Title	Role
1999	You Don't Know My Mind	Na Dae-ro
2000	Drama City "Under the Cherry Blossoms"	
2000	Virtue	Im Ji-seok
2000	Rookie	Yoo Shi-han
2001	Hotelier	Choi Young-jae
2001	Legend	Choi Tae-ha
2002	Present	Park Chang-joon
2002	Age of Innocence	Dong-hwa
2002	Remember	Choi Dong-min
2003	Screen	Park Tae-young
2007	Blue Fish	Lee Hyun-woo
2007	Eight Days, Assassination Attempts against King Jeongjo	Jeong Yak-yong
2008	Aquarius	Kim Min-woo
2008	War of Money: The Original	Geum Na-ra
2008	My Woman	Jang Tae-sung
2009	Queen Seondeok	Kim Yong-su
2009	Wife Returns	Min Young-hoon
2010	First Marriage	Lee Chang-soo
2011	Gwanggaeto, The Great Conqueror	King Asin
2012	Happy Ending	Lee Tae-pyung
2013	The Scandal	Jo Jin-woong
2014	Angel's Revenge	Jang Tae-jung
2017	First Love Again	Choi Jung-woo
2020	Eccentric! Chef Moon	Kang Min-seok

=== Film ===
Year	Title	Role
2001	Scent of Love	Kim Min-kyu
2003	Oh! Happy Day	Kim Hyun-joon
2008	The Divine Weapon	Crown Prince (cameo)
2013	No Breathing	Coach Jang
2016	Canola	lawyer Seo (cameo)
TBA	A Day in Tongyeong	Park Du-gwan

=== Variety show ===
Year	Title	Notes
2012	Chuseok Special Comedy Show: Kim Byung-man and Lee Soo-geun's 10-Year Dream	
2012	Law of the Jungle in Madagascar	Cast member
2012	Law of the Jungle in Amazon and the Galapagos	Cast member
2013	Law of the Jungle in New Zealand	Cast member
2013	Law of the Jungle in the Himalayas	Cast member
2013	Law of the Jungle in Micronesia	Cast member
2014	Law of the Jungle in the Solomon Islands	Cast member
2014–2015	Law of the Jungle in Costa Rica	Cast member
2018	Law of the Jungle in Cook Islands	Cast member
2018	Law of the Jungle in Sabah	Cast member

== Awards and nominations ==
Year	Award	Category	Nominated work	Result
1997	KBS Super Talent Contest	Bronze Prize	—N/a	Won
2000	SBS Drama Awards	New Star Award	Rookie	Nominated
2001	MBC Drama Awards	Best New Actor	Hotelier	Nominated
2001	SBS Drama Awards	New Star Award	Legend	Won
2002	MBC Drama Awards	Excellence Award, Actor in a Serial Drama	Remember	Nominated
2008	1st Korea Jewelry Awards	Pearl Award	—N/a	Won
2014	KBS Drama Awards	Excellence Award, Actor in a Daily Drama	Angel's Revenge	Nominated
