= Sangŭiwŏn =

Joseon government department

Sangŭiwŏn (Korean: 상의원; Hanja: 尙衣院) was a Joseon government department in charge of the royal attire. Before the foundation of the Joseon dynasty, the Goryeo dynasty also set up a similar department, which was called "Sanguiguk". The name, however, continued to transform during the late Goryeo period.

Sangŭiwŏn had an important role in several ways. Firstly, the department created and offered attire. As for attire, silk and cloth were highly required to prepare for the royal family. Secondly, it was responsible to preserve treasure of royal palace, keeping abreast of confirming storage. That also includes that officers also executed as agent for importing luxurious goods and herbs. The first dated back to the founder of Joseon. The official terminology was changed into Sanguisa in Gojong 32 of 1895.

== Popular culture ==
The department was depicted in the 2014 film The Royal Tailor.
