= Jump (TV series) =

1999 South Korean television sitcom

- Genre: Sitcom
- Starring: Seo Kyung-seok; Gu Bon-seung; Choi Bool-am; Chae Rim
- Country of origin: South Korea

Original release
- Network: MBC
- Release: 1999

Jump is a South Korean sitcom that aired on MBC in 1999.

== Cast ==
Main cast

- Seo Kyung-seok
- Gu Bon-seung
- Choi Bool-am
- Chae Rim

Supporting cast

- Kim Sun-a
- Go Soo
- Zo In-sung
- Yoon Tae-young
- Park Gwang-hyun
- Yang Mi-ra
- Kwak Jung-wook
- Hong Seok-cheon
- Park Si-eun
- Kim Jung-kyoon
- Yang Jung-kyoon
- Moon Cheon-shik
- Seo Beom-shik
- Lee Kyung-shil
- Choi Sang-hak
- Hong Jin-kyung
