= Piano (TV series) =

2001–2002 South Korean TV series

- Genre: Romance; Melodrama
- Written by: Kim Kyu-wan; Lee Young-chul
- Directed by: Oh Jong-rok
- Starring: Cho Jae-hyun; Go Soo; Kim Ha-neul; Zo In-sung
- Country of origin: South Korea
- Original language: Korean
- No. of episodes: 16

Production
- Production location: Korea
- Running time: Wednesdays and Thursdays at 21:55 (KST)
- Production company: JS Pictures

Original release
- Network: Seoul Broadcasting System
- Release: November 21, 2001 – January 10, 2002

Piano (Korean: 피아노) is a 2001 South Korean television series starring Cho Jae-hyun, Go Soo, Kim Ha-neul and Zo In-sung. It aired on SBS from November 21, 2001 to January 10, 2002 on Wednesdays and Thursdays at 21:55 for 16 episodes.

A melodrama about a father's love for his children and a forbidden romance between stepsiblings, Piano received high ratings during its airing, as well as acting recognition at the year-end network awards ceremony.

== Synopsis ==
Han Eok-kwan (Cho Jae-hyun) is a ruthless, foul-mouthed small-time gangster in Busan. When fellow gangster Dok-sa (Lee Jae-yong) betrays their boss Byun Hak-soo (Im Dong-jin) to take his place as the new boss, Eok-kwan is exiled from the gang. Then a former lover contacts him to meet her in Seoul, but once he gets there, all he finds is a 10-year-old boy named Jae-soo, who claims to be his son. At first he plans to abandon the boy, but unable to do it, ends up raising him.

Shin Hye-rim (Jo Min-su) is a widow with two children, 12-year-old daughter Soo-ah and 10-year-old son Kyung-ho. After her husband, a district attorney, dies, she leaves Seoul with her children and moves to Busan, where she opens a piano school. Eok-kwan falls head over heels in love with the piano teacher, and they later marry.

Shortly after, Hye-rim dies in a boating accident. Soo-ah and Kyung-ho, who've always resented their new stepfather, blame him for her death and try to leave the family home, but Eok-kwan begs them to stay. Transformed into a loving and hardworking father, he raises the three children to the best of his abilities.

A few years pass, and all three children, and their sister Joo-hee (played by Kim Hee-jung first, then by Jung Da-hye), are now young adults. Unbeknownst to Eok-kwan, his biological son Jae-soo (Go Soo) and stepdaughter Soo-ah (Kim Ha-neul) are deeply in love with each other. Though not related by blood, they know that a romantic relationship between them would be taboo, so they suppress their feelings. After Kyung-ho kills a man attempting to rape Soo-ah, Jae-soo takes the rap and goes to prison in his place, with his spotless record ensuring a short sentence. Kyung-ho escapes to Seoul.

When Jae-soo is released from prison after several years, he studies to become a doctor. Soo-ah meanwhile works at a record shop. Kyung-ho, still a rebellious and angry young man, returns to Busan and becomes involved in the city's criminal underworld.

== Cast ==
=== Main cast ===
- Cho Jae-hyun as Han Eok-kwan
- Go Soo as Han Jae-soo
  - Kim Hak-joon as young Jae-soo
- Kim Ha-neul as Lee Soo-ah
  - Kang Bo-kyung as young Soo-ah
- Zo In-sung as Lee Kyung-ho
  - Choi Tae-joon as young Kyung-ho
- Jo Min-su as Shin Hye-rim, widow of In Hak

=== Supporting cast ===
- Jo Hyung-ki as Si-sook
- Jung Da-hye as Han Joo-hee (daughter of Eok-kwan and Hye-rim, paternal sister of Jae-soo, and maternal sister of Kyung-ho and Soo-ah)
  - Kim Hee-jung as young Joo-hee
- Kim Young-chan as Jae-min
- Lee Jae-yong as Dok-sa
- Jung Sung-hwan as Young-tak
- Kim Ha-kyun as Deputy section chief Oh
- Im Dong-jin as Byun Hak-soo
- Yang Geum-seok as Kim In-soon
- Hwang In-young as Woo Min-kyung
- Song Jae-ho as Dr. Woo
- Baek Seung-hyeon as Kyung-ho's friend
- Im Dae-ho as bakery employee
- Jo Sang-ki as bakery employee
- Shin Seung-hwan as Suk-chol, gangster, Kyung-ho's enemy
- Lee Bo-hee as Lee Eun-shim
- Hong Yeo-jin as Mok-po's Neighbor of Han Eok-kwan
- Kim Ji-young as sister-in-law of Shin Hye-rim
- Jo Hyung-ki as brother-in-law of Shin Hye-rim
- Kim Young-mi as Jang Eun-ji

== Rating ==
Piano was the second most successful drama of 2001, only being surpassed by Ladies of the Palace. The highest rating that the show reached was 40.2%.

== Awards ==
2001 SBS Drama Awards

- Top Excellence Award, Actor: Cho Jae-hyun
- Excellence Award, Actress: Kim Ha-neul
- New Star Award: Go Soo
- New Star Award: Zo In-sung
- Popularity Award: Go Soo
- Top 10 Stars: Cho Jae-hyun
