= Lee Dong-wook filmography =

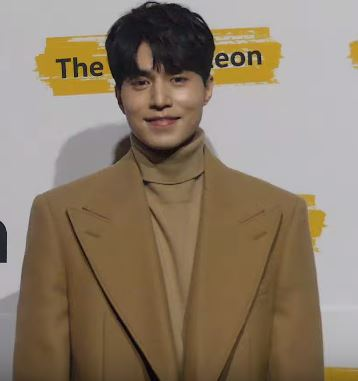
- Lee in 2018
- Film: 8
- Television series: 44
- Web series: 1
- Radio show: 4
- Theatre: 1

Lee Dong-wook (Korean: 이동욱; born November 6, 1981) is a South Korean actor, host, model, and singer.

He rose to fame with his role in the romantic comedy drama My Girl (2005). Some of his other notable works include Scent of a Woman (2011), The Fugitive of Joseon (2013), Hotel King (2014), Goblin (2016–2017), Touch Your Heart (2019), Tale of the Nine Tailed (2020), Bad and Crazy (2021), Tale of the Nine Tailed 1938 (2023), and A Shop for Killers (2024).

== Film ==
Year	Title	Role	Notes	Ref.
2006	Arang	Lee Hyun-ki		
2007	The Perfect Couple	Kang Jae-hyuk		
2008	Heartbreak Library	Kim Joon-oh		
2010	The Recipe	Kim Hyun-soo		
2015	The Beauty Inside	Kim Woo-jin		
2021	A Year-End Medley	Yong-jin		
2023	Single in Seoul	Park Yeong-ho		
2024	Harbin	Lee Chang-seop	Special appearance	

== Television series ==
Year	Title	Role	Notes	Ref.
1999	Sunday Best "Coaching"		Extra	
1999	Best Theater "There's a world outside of the road"	Lee Sung-joon		
1999–2000	School 2	Lee Kang-san	Ep. 32 to 42	
2000	Secret	Kang Hyun-soo		
2000–2001	School 3	Lee Kang-san		
2001	Family Month Special Drama "A Dreaming Family"	Hong-chan		
2001	Four Sisters	Lee Han-soo	Ep. 1	
2001	Golbangi	Lee Dong-wook	Ep. 167 to 247	
2001	Best Theater "Fish at the End of the Sea"	Byung-se		
2001	Pure Heart	Jang Ho-goo		
2001	Drama City "Hide-and-seek"	Detective Han		
2001	The Unstoppables	Park Sung-jin	Ep. 252	
2001–2002	This Is Love	Lee Jae-hyun	Ep. 46 to 172	
2002	That's Perfect!	Lee Dong-wook	Ep. 36 to 74	
2002	Drama City "Happier Than Heaven"	Park Joon-young		
2002	Let's Go	Lee Dong-wook		
2002	Loving You	Lee Min		
2002–2003	Honest Living	Lee Dong-wook	Ep. 1 to 123; Cameo, Ep. 232	
2003	Land of Wine	Song Do-il		
2003–2004	Merry Go Round	Park Sung-pyo		
2004	Island Village Teacher	Jang Jae-doo		
2004–2005	Precious Family	Ahn Jung-hwan		
2005	Hanoi Bride	Park Eun-woo	One-act drama	
2005–2006	My Girl	Seol Gong-chan		
2008	Bitter Sweet Life	Lee Joon-soo		
2009	Partner	Lee Tae-jo		
2011	Scent of a Woman	Kang Ji-wook		
2012	Wild Romance	Park Moo-yeol		
2013	The Fugitive of Joseon	Choi Won		
2014	The Story of Kang-goo	Kim Kyung-tae	One-act drama	
2014	Hotel King	Cha Jae-wan		
2014	Blade Man	Joo Hong-bin		
2015	Bubble Gum	Park Ri-hwan		
2016–2017	Guardian: The Lonely and Great God	Grim Reaper / Wang Yeo / Lee Hyuk / Kim Woo Bin		
2018	Life	Ye Jin-woo		
2019	Touch Your Heart	Kwon Jung-rok		
2019	Search: WWW	Ta-mi's ex-boyfriend	Cameo, Ep. 7	
2019	Hell Is Other People	Seo Moon-jo		
2020	Tale of the Nine Tailed	Lee Yeon		
2021–2022	Bad and Crazy	Ryu Su-yeol		
2023	Tale of the Nine Tailed 1938	Lee Yeon		
2024-2026	A Shop for Killers	Jeong Jin-man		
2025	The Divorce Insurance	Noh Ki-jun		
2025	The Nice Guy	Park Seok-cheol		

== Web series ==
Year	Title	Role	Ref.
2017	Love is	Lee Dong-wook	

== Theatre ==
Year	Title	Role	Notes	Ref.
2013	Creative Show directed by Jang Jin	Theatre director	Promotional performance produced for Samsung Galaxy Note	

== Hosting and variety shows ==
Year	Title	Role	Notes	Ref.
2007	8th Jeonju International Film Festival Closing Ceremony	Host	with So Yi-hyun; May 4	
2009	Fun Economy to learn on TV – "Quiz Battle Economy Training School"	Host	with On Joo-wan; Dec 16, 23	
2010	2nd ROK-US Army band concert	Host	with Yang Se-hyung; Mar 25	
2010	6.25 war 60th anniversary Photo exhibition – "On the line"	Docent	with Lee Joon-gi; Jun 25 to Aug 20	
2010	Open pineapple – "Junior Quiz contest about Copyright law"	Host	with Han Young; Sep 6	
2010	7th Korea Defense Daily Comrade Marathon	Host	Oct 16	
2010–2011	Culture is good	Host	with Boom; 20 Jan 2010 to 6 Apr 2011	
2011	ROK Army band concert with Daegu Citizens	Host	with Kang Mi-kyung; Mar 16	
2011	Cultural and Art performances with Chunma Army Base	Host	Apr 1	
2011	Shin Mi-sik's NLL Photo exhibition – "Colors of the Sea"	Docent	with Lee Dong-gun; Apr 21 to 24	
2012	2012 SBS Drama Awards	Host	with Jung Ryeo-won; Dec 31	
2012–2013	Strong Heart	Host	with Shin Dong-yup; 10 Apr 2012 to 12 Feb 2013	
2014–2015	Roommate	Cast	Season 1, 2; 4 May 2014 to 14 Apr 2015	
2015	10th Seoul International Drama Awards	Host	with Kim Jung-eun; Sep 10	
2016	The Body Show 3: My Body Guard	Host	with Jo Yoon-hee, Jo Se-ho; Apr 28 to Jun 30	
2017	Guardian: The Lonely and Great God Special	Host	with Yoo In-na; Feb 3 to 4	
2017	6th Edaily W Festa (World Woman Forum 2017) Epilogue	Special Speaker	with Kim Eun-sook; Oct 25	
2019	Produce X101	Host		
2019–2020	Wook Talk	Host	with Jang Do-yeon and Jo Jung-shik	
2021	Sea of Hope	Cast member	Head Bartender	
2026	Guardian: The Lonely and Great God 10th Anniversary	Cast member	with Yoo In-na and Gong Yoo and Kim Go-eun; July 4 to 12	

== Radio ==
Year	Title	Network	Notes	Ref.
2009	Good Morning	Friends FM	Oct 22 to Nov 7	
2009–2010	Kim Jeong-hoon's Voice Mail – "Two Cynical Men's Talk"	Friends FM	with Kim Jeong-hoon once a week 18 Nov 2009 to 25 Mar 2010	
2010	Kim Jaewon and Lee Dong-wook's The heart you want to give, the story you want to hear	Friends FM	with Kim Jaewon; Apr 5 to Nov 26	
2017–2018	Lee Dong-wook's On the air	V LIVE	every 12th day 12 Apr 2017 to 12 Jan 2018	

== Music video appearances ==
Year	Song title	Artist	Notes	Ref.
2005	"I Love You"	Lee Jae-hoon		
2005	"Bye Bye Bye"	Monday Kiz		
2006	"Spring, Summer, Fall, Winter"	Suho feat. Kim Tae-woo		
2007	"Lost in the Forest of Love"	Jed feat. Im Chang-jung		
2007	"Bad Boy"	Jed feat. Bobby Kim		
2008	"As Much as We Loved"	Suho feat. Park Sang-joon		
2009	"Missed Call"	Suho feat. Kim Bum-soo		
2010	"Dandelion"	Zozo feat. Park Ji-heon	Also directed this music video	
2011	"Replay"	Kim Dong-ryul		
2013	"Cosmic Girl"	Kim Tae-woo		
2017	"I Still"	Soyou, Sung Si-kyung		
