= Han Ji-eun =

South Korean actress (born 1987)

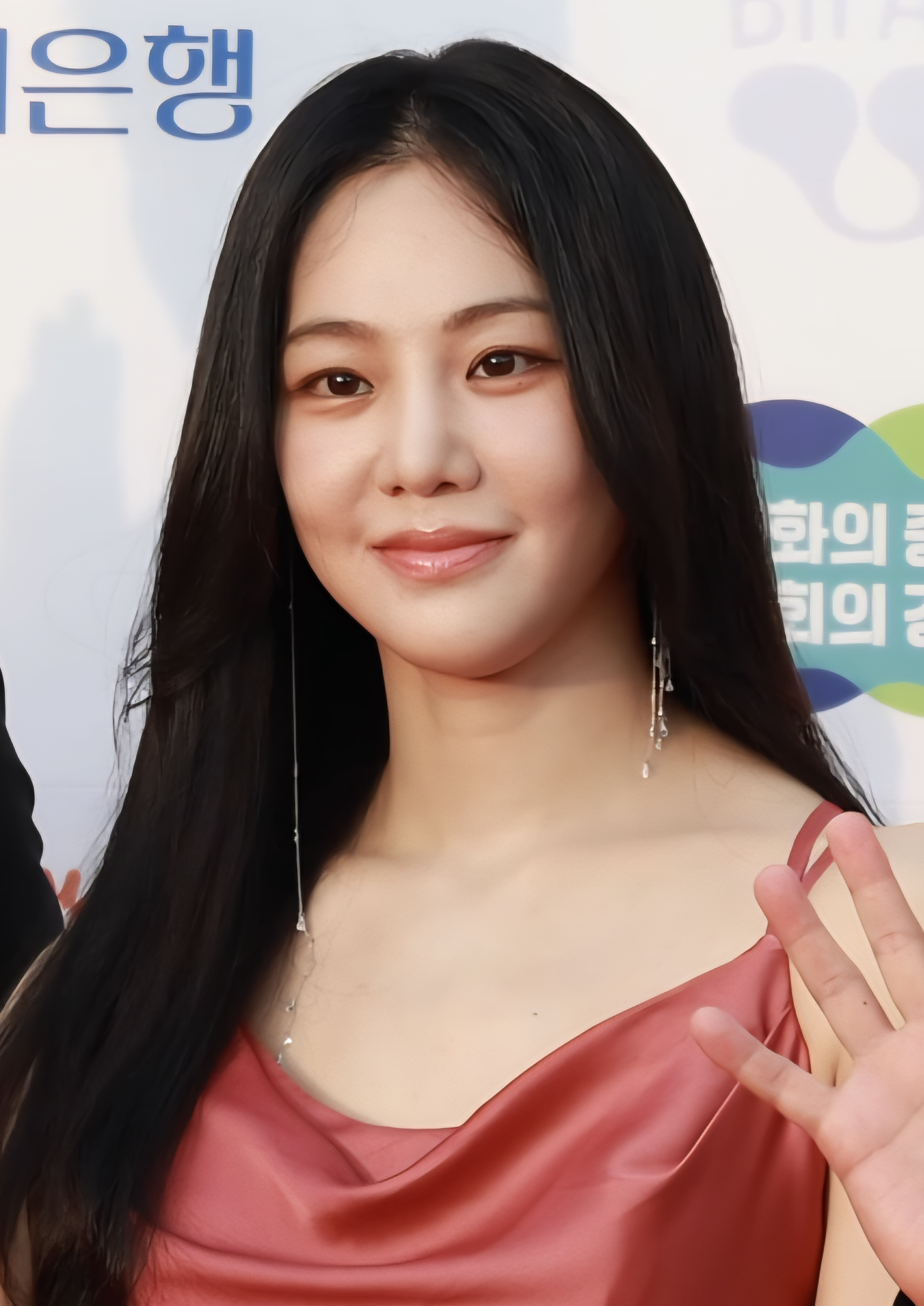
- Han in 2025
- Born: June 3, 1987 (age 39); Gwacheon, South Korea
- Education: Dongduk Women's University
- Occupation: Actress
- Years active: 2006–present
- Agent: Gram Entertainment

Korean name
- Hangul: 한지은
- RR: Han Jieun
- MR: Han Chiŭn

Han Ji-eun (Korean: 한지은; born June 3, 1987) is a South Korean actress. She made her acting debut in 2010 in the film Ghost. She is known for her work in both film and television including Rampant (2018), 100 Days My Prince (2018), Be Melodramatic (2019), and Lovestruck in the City (2020).

== Early life ==
Han Ji-eun was born on June 3, 1987. She graduated from Dongduk Women's University, Department of Broadcasting and Entertainment.

== Career ==
Han made her acting debut with the film Ghost in 2010, starring opposite Han Ye-ri.

In 2016, she led the cast of beauty drama Introduction to Beauty, a web series streamed on Naver TV.

In 2018, Han appeared in supporting roles in the films Rampant and Door Lock, and the dramas Twelve Nights and 100 Days My Prince.

In 2019, she landed her first lead role in the JTBC drama Be Melodramatic, in which she portrayed a single mother in her early thirties. In the same year she collaborated with radio DJ Jung Sung-gyu for the Sunday Music Drama aired on "Good Morning FM".

Han portrayed Lee Tae-ri in Kkondae Intern, a MBC drama broadcast from May to June 2020. In November, she made her first appearance on the variety show Running Man. She also appeared in KakaoTV's romantic comedy Lovestruck in the City as Oh Sun-young opposite Ryu Kyung-soo.

On June 14, 2021, it was announced that Han has signed with Secret ENT.

In 2021, she did a cameo in web series The Witch's Diner and starred in the mystery drama Bad and Crazy as Hee-gyeom, a detective of the drug crime investigation team alongside Lee Dong-wook.

In July 2024, Han signed with new agency Gram Entertainment.

== Filmography ==
=== Films ===
Year	Title	Role	Notes	Ref.
2010	Ghost (Be with Me)	Eun-ji	Omnibus film (segment "Tarot 3")	
2014	Miss Granny	Mi-ae		
2014	The Royal Tailor	Chwui-hyang-ru courtesan		
2014	The Con Artists	Reporter		
2015	Coin Locker	Fitness center woman 2		
2015	Love Guide for Dumpees	Pictorial model 1		
2016	Train to Busan	Woman wearing earphones		
2017	Fabricated City	Party planner		
2017	The Tooth and the Nail	Cheonhui Hong Se-hee		
2017	Real	Han Ye-won		
2018	Rampant	Royal Noble Consort Gyeong		
2018	Door Lock	Kang Seung-hye		
2019	Scent of Ghost	Seon-mi		
2024	Can We Get Married?	Min Woo-jung		
2025	Hitman 2	Final runner		
2025	Only God Knows Everything	Yoon Joo-young		
2026	The Intern	Baek Ru-da	Cameo	

=== Television series ===
Year	Title	Role	Notes	Ref.
2012	Lights and Shadows	Light country show member		
2014	Two Mothers			
2014	You Are My Destiny	Mi-Yeong, Daniel's sister		
2015	City of the Sun			
2015	Unkind Ladies			
2016	Five Enough	Actress		
2016	Entourage	Cha Joon's blind date		
2017–2018	Love Returns			
2018	Children of a Lesser God			
2018	The Miracle We Met			
2018	100 Days My Prince	Ae-weol		
2018	Twelve Nights	Park Sun-joo		
2019	Be Melodramatic	Hwang Han-joo		
2019	Psychopath Diary	Woman	Cameo (episode 2)	
2020	Kkondae Intern	Lee Tae-ri		
2021	All of Us Are Dead	One of Park Eun-hee's aides	8 Episodes (3–7, 9, 10, 12)	
2021	My Roommate Is a Gumiho	Leader of publishing company	Cameo (episode 1 and 5–6)	
2021–2022	Bad and Crazy	Lee Hui-gyeom		
2022	KBS Drama Special – "Meet in a Strange Season"	Oh Hee-joo	One act-drama	
2023	My Lovely Liar		Cameo	
2024	Nothing Uncovered	Cha Eun-sae		
2025	When the Stars Gossip	Choi Go-eun		
2026	Fifties Professionals	Park Mi-kyung		

=== Web series ===
Year	Title	Role	Notes	Ref.
2016	Introduction to Beauty	Lee Bong-ju		
2020	Lovestruck in the City	Oh Seon-yeong		
2021	The Witch's Diner	Book Writer	Cameo, episode 8	
2022	Stock Struck	Yu Mi-seo		
2025	Study Group	Lee Han-kyeong		
2026	Notes from the Last Row	Seon Min-hui		

=== Music video appearances ===
Year	Song title	Artist	Ref.
2015	"It's Okay"	BtoB	

== Awards and nominations ==
Name of the award ceremony, year presented, category, nominee of the award, and the result of the nomination
Award ceremony	Year	Category	Nominee / Work	Result	Ref.
APAN Star Awards	2025	Icon Awards	Han Ji-eun	Won	
Brand Customer Loyalty Award	2025	Most Influential Actress (Hot Trend)	Han Ji-eun	Won	
KBS Drama Awards	2022	Best Actress in Drama Special/TV Cinema	The Stranger	Nominated	
MBC Drama Awards	2020	Excellence Award, Actress in a Wednesday-Thursday Miniseries	Kkondae Intern	Nominated	
Seoul Global Movie Awards	2025	Best Supporting Actress	Hitman 2	Won	
