= Lee Tae-sun =

South Korean actor

- Born: July 16, 1993 (age 33); South Korea
- Education: Kyung Hee University – Theater and Film
- Occupation: Actor
- Years active: 2016–present
- Agent: Namoo Actors

Korean name
- Hangul: 이태선
- RR: I Taeseon
- MR: I T'aesŏn

Lee Tae-sun (born July 16, 1993) is a South Korean actor.

== Career ==
Lee Tae-sun made his television debut in the 2016 romantic comedy Entertainer where he portrayed a single dad and bassist of a band. The following year, he was cast in Queen of the Ring, which is the third installment of the Three Color Fantasy trilogy, and in the black comedy Prison Playbook, in which he played the younger version of Park Hae-soo's character.

In 2018, Lee joined the cast of OCN's fantasy romantic comedy My First Love. He also took on the role of an elite lawyer in Suits, adapted from the American television series of the same name, and a bar owner as well as the male lead's childhood friend in Gangnam Beauty.

In 2019, Lee appeared in Hotel del Luna, playing IU's character's best friend Yeon-woo in his past life and police officer Park Young-soo in his current life, for which he gained recognition. He was also cast in Beautiful Love, Wonderful Life and starred in the third drama of KBS Drama Special's tenth season, Wreck Car.

In 2020, Lee appeared on tvN's travel show RUN alongside Ji Sung, Kang Ki-young and Hwang Hee, and on SBS's basketball reality show program Handsome Tigers.

== Filmography ==
=== Television series ===
Year	Title	Role	Notes	Ref.
2016	Entertainer	Na Yeon-soo		
2017	Queen of the Ring	Byeon Tae-hyeon		
2017–18	Prison Playbook	Kim Je-hyeok (young)		
2018	My First Love	Shin Joo-hwan		
2018	Suits	Seo Gi-woong		
2018	Gangnam Beauty	Seo Yoo-jin		
2019	Hotel del Luna	Yeon-woo / Park Young-soo		
2019	KBS Drama Special	Jeong Tae-goo	Episode: "Wreck Car"	
2019–20	Beautiful Love, Wonderful Life	Kang Shi-wol		
2021	Next Door Witch J	Lee Woo-bin	Web Series	
2023	Our Blooming Youth	Kim Myung-jin		

=== Variety shows ===
Year	Title	Role	Ref.
2020	RUN	Cast member	
2020	Handsome Tigers	Cast member	

== Awards and nominations ==
Year	Award	Category	Work(s)	Result	Ref.
2019	33rd KBS Drama Awards	Best Actor in a One-Act/Special/Short Drama	Drama Special ("Wreck Car")	Nominated	
