= Doctor John (TV series) =

2019 South Korean television series

- Promotional poster
- Hangul: 의사요한
- Lit.: Doctor Yo-han
- RR: Uisa Yohan
- MR: Ŭisa Yohan
- Genre: Medical drama
- Created by: SBS Drama Operation Team
- Based on: On Hand of God by Yo Kusakabe
- Written by: Kim Ji-woon
- Directed by: Jo Soo-won; Kim Young-hwan; Lee Gye-joon
- Starring: Ji Sung; Lee Se-young; Lee Kyu-hyung; Hwang Hee
- Music by: Moon Seong-nam
- Country of origin: South Korea
- Original language: Korean
- No. of episodes: 16 (Note: In order to circumvent Korean laws that prevent commercial breaks in the middle of an episode, what would previously have been aired as single 70 minute episodes are now being repackaged as two 35 minute episodes, with two episodes being shown each night with a commercial break between the two.)

Production
- Producer: Jang Jin-wook
- Camera setup: Single-camera
- Running time: 70 minutes
- Production company: KPJ Corporation

Original release
- Network: SBS TV
- Release: July 19 – September 7, 2019

Doctor John (Korean: 의사요한) is a 2019 South Korean television series starring Ji Sung, Lee Se-young, Lee Kyu-hyung, and Hwang Hee. It is based on the Japanese novel On Hand of God by Yo Kusakabe and aired on SBS from July 19 to September 7, 2019.

A recurring theme throughout the series is the debate over euthanasia.

== Synopsis ==
Cha Yo-han (Ji Sung) is a doctor of anesthesiology. He acts strangely sometimes, but he is a genius at his work. Kang Shi-young (Lee Se-young) is a resident of anesthesiology who works with Cha Yo-han. She is smart, warm and listens carefully to her patients. People with mysterious acute or chronic pain come to the hospital. There, Cha Yo-han and Kang Shi-young try to find the causes of their pain and treat them.

== Cast ==
=== Main ===
- Ji Sung as Cha Yo-han / John Cha
  - Park Shi-wan as young Yo-han

A talented anesthesiologist who spent three years in prison for performing euthanasia on a dying patient whose pain he could not reduce. He is often called "Ten Seconds" as he can diagnose one's disease very quickly. He secretly suffers from CIPA until it was exposed by Chae Eun-jeong, who held hatred towards Yo-han for ending the life of her daughter's murderer with euthanasia.

- Lee Se-young as Kang Shi-young

A second year resident who was a top student at medical school. She took a break during her studies after she could not save her father in an accident. She decides to come back to the hospital after working in the prison where she met Yo-han.

- Lee Kyu-hyung as Son Seok-ki

A prosecutor who is against the practice of euthanasia. He was present during Yo-han's trial and wanted to sentence him to ten years in prison. He holds a grudge against the doctor who ended the life of Yoon Seong-kyu, a murderer who killed Seok-ki's son. He suffers from stomach cancer. It is also shown that he is an opponent to the death penalty, viewing it as an act nothing less than murder, albeit a legally-sanctioned one.

- Hwang Hee as Lee Yoo-joon

A fellow of the Anesthesiology Department. He first wants to prove Yo-han wrong as the doctor corrected his misdiagnosis twice when he was an inmate, but eventually decides to learn from him instead.

- Shin Dong-mi as Chae Eun-jeong

A nurse at a hospice center. Yo-han ended the life of her daughter's murderer, terminal cancer patient Yoon Seong-kyu — who also killed Seok-ki's son — which causes Eun-jeong to hate Yo-han, and become an antagonist.

=== Supporting ===
==== Hanse Hospital Pain Management Team ====
- Jung Min-ah as Kang Mi-rae

A third year resident and Shi-young's younger sister who is allergic to animal hair, including cats. She has a strained relationship with Shi-young over the health of their comatose father.

- Kwon Hwa-woon as Heo Joon

A fourth year resident.

- Oh Hyun-joong as Kim Won-hee

A first year resident.

- Son San as Nurse Hong

A nurse with 20 years of experience.

- Lee Yoo-mi as Na Kyeong-ah

A nurse with 3 years of experience.

==== People at Hanse Hospital ====
- Kim Hye-eun as Min Tae-kyeong

Chief of the Anesthesiology Department. Shi-young and Mi-rae's mother.

- Kim Young-hoon as Han Myeong-oh

A lawyer specializing in medical affairs.

- Um Hyo-sup as Kang I-moon

Director of Hanse Hospital.

- Oh Seung-hyun as Min Joo-kyeong

Professor of the Anesthesiology Department. Shi-young and Mi-rae's aunt.

- Jung Jae-sung as Kwon Seok

Professor of the Anesthesiology Department.

==== Patients ====
- Ham Sung-min as Yoon Seong-kyu

An anal cancer patient. He was a child murderer who murdered Seok-ki's son and Eun-jeong's daughter, but before he could be punished by law, Seong-kyu was hospitalised for terminal cancer. Yo-han allegedly ended his life with euthanasia as Seong-kyu could not bear the torment of his illness any longer.

- Kim Do-hoon as Park Jung-bo

Inmate 5353 who suffers from Fabry disease. Also a barista.

- Ha Do-kwon as Joo Hyeong-woo

A Mixed Martial Arts Champion who suffers from myasthenia gravis.

- Yoon Chan-young as Lee Gi-seok

A CIPA patient and high school student.

- Lee Ju-won as Choi Seung-won

A shingles patient (first mistaken for CRPS).

- Lee Do-kyung as Yu Dok-gyu

A melioidosis patient.

- Chun Young-min as Lee Da-hae

A phantom limb patient.

- Oh Yu-na as Yu Ri-hye

A former actress who suffers from neuroblastoma.

==== Others ====
- Jang Hee-soo as professor

A professor of Anesthesiology and Pain Medicine.

- Kim Gyul as Seong Dong-ho

A professor of Anesthesiology and Pain Medicine.

- Yoon Joo-sang as Lee Won-gil

Former Minister of Health and Welfare. He supports the practice of euthanasia.

- Moon Hak-jin as Kim Jung-woo

A third year resident in ophthalmology.

- Kim Seung-hoon as a prison guard

=== Special appearances ===
- Jeon No-min as Kang I-soo, hospital's chairman and Shi-young's father.
- Jung In-gi as Oh Jeong-nam, Shi-young's uncle and prison warden.
- Jung Kyung-soon as Yoo-joon's mother and owner of a restaurant.
- Lim Dong-jin as Shim Joon-cheol, a neurology professor and Yo-han's doctor.
- Lee Ah-jin as The mother of a child with diabetes.

== Production ==
According to director Jo Soo-won, the series was in development since 2014, the year when SBS bought the rights to adapt Yo Kusakabe's On Hand of God as a TV series.

Early working titles of the series were Doctor Room (Korean: 닥터룸) and Pain Doctor Cha Yo-han (Korean: 통증의사 차요한).

The first script reading took place in March 2019 at SBS Ilsan Production Center in Tanhyun, South Korea.

== Original soundtrack ==
Doctor John OST

Soundtrack album by Various artists
- Released: 2019
- Genre: Soundtrack
- Languages: Korean; English
- Labels: Blending Co., Ltd. SBS Content Hub Co., Ltd.

=== Part 1 ===
Released on July 26, 2019
No.	Title	Lyrics	Music	Artist	Length
1.	"Way Back"	Ha-na	Jung Sung-min; Safira.K	Safira.K	3:30
2.	"Way Back" (Inst.)		Jung Sung-min; Safira.K		3:30
Total length:					7:00

=== Part 2 ===
Released on August 2, 2019
No.	Title	Lyrics	Music	Artist	Length
1.	"Look At"	MYK	MYK	SALTNPAPER	3:16
2.	"Look At" (Inst.)		MYK		3:16
Total length:					6:32

=== Part 3 ===
Released on August 9, 2019
No.	Title	Lyrics	Music	Artist	Length
1.	"Star"	Kim Young-sung; Song Chan-ran	Kim Young-sung; Song Chan-ran	Minseo	3:53
2.	"Star" (Inst.)		Kim Young-sung; Song Chan-ran		3:53
Total length:					7:46

=== Part 4 ===
Released on August 16, 2019
No.	Title	Lyrics	Music	Artist	Length
1.	"Pain or Death"	Moon Sung-nam	Moon Sung-nam; Simji; Gravity	Samuel Seo	4:28
2.	"Pain or Death" (Inst.)		Moon Sung-nam; Simji; Gravity		4:28
Total length:					8:56

=== Part 5 ===
Released on August 23, 2019
No.	Title	Lyrics	Music	Artist	Length
1.	"Just Go"	Moon Sung-nam	Moon Sung-nam	Baek A-yeon	3:42
2.	"Just Go" (Inst.)		Moon Sung-nam		3:42
Total length:					7:24

=== Part 6 ===
Released on August 30, 2019
No.	Title	Lyrics	Music	Artist	Length
1.	"Way Back (Acoustic Ver.)"	Ha-na	Jung Sung-min; Safira.K	Jinsil	3:40
2.	"Way Back (Acoustic Ver.)" (Inst.)		Jung Sung-min; Safira.K		3:40
Total length:					7:20

=== Part 7 ===
Released on September 6, 2019
No.	Title	Lyrics	Music	Artist	Length
1.	"Reason" (이유)	Tree Tube	Tree Tube	Tree Tube	3:39
2.	"Reason" (Inst.)		Tree Tube		3:39
Total length:					7:18

Disc 2:
No.	Title	Artist	Length
1.	"Golden Hour"	Romantisco	1:24
2.	"Run"	Jeong Cha-sik	3:10
3.	"Life Cycle"	Moon Sung-nam	1:27
4.	"Actually"	Son Han-mook	2:57
5.	"Into the Room"	Kim Yung-jin	1:33
6.	"Morning Star"	Lee Hye-rim	3:04
7.	"Fatal"	No Sa-ra	2:45
8.	"Coming Home" (Guitar Roman)	Moon Sung-nam	2:56
9.	"Pulse"	Jeong Cha-sik	1:24
10.	"Pure Death"	Romantisco	3:08
11.	"Serene Death"	Son Han-mook	3:01
12.	"Day Off"	Kim Hong-gap	3:22
13.	"Memories"	Moon Sung-nam	3:59
14.	"Mad Cello"	Jeong Cha-sik	3:29
15.	"Creeping Monster"	Kim Yung-jin	1:15
16.	"Jest"	Romantisco	1:50
17.	"Decision"	Son Han-mook	3:47
18.	"Pain or Death" (Guitar Sad)	Moon Sung-nam	3:15
19.	"Obsession"	Lee Hye-rim	2:23
20.	"Remembrance"	No Sa-ra	2:48
21.	"Coming Home" (Strings)	Moon Sung-nam	4:40
22.	"Missing"	Romantisco	2:15
23.	"An Unpleasant Memory"	Son Han-mook	2:37
24.	"Swear"	Jeong Cha-sik	3:32

== Viewership ==
Doctor john : South Korea viewers per episode (millions)

Episodes	Episode number															
Episodes	1	2	3	4	5	6	7	8	9	10	11	12	13	14	15	16
1–16	1.030	1.460	1.305	1.933	1.330	2.066	1.498	2.129	1.486	1.847	1.406	1.877	1.476	1.972	1.397	2.019
17–32	1.330	1.707	1.164	1.843	1.268	1.547	0.961	1.527	1.223	1.526	0.958	1.659	1.209	1.483	1.205	1.922

Source: Audience measurement performed nationwide by Nielsen Media Research.

Ep.	Original broadcast date	Title	Average audience share (AGB Nielsen)	
Ep.	Original broadcast date	Title	Nationwide	Seoul
1	July 19, 2019	Between Hope and Despair (희망과 절망 사이)	6.0% (16th)	6.3% (15th)
2	July 19, 2019	Between Hope and Despair (희망과 절망 사이)	8.4% (8th)	8.7% (7th)
3	July 20, 2019	A 0.00001% Hope (0.00001%의 희망)	7.0% (15th)	7.5% (9th)
4	July 20, 2019	A 0.00001% Hope (0.00001%의 희망)	10.1% (4th)	11.3% (3rd)
5	July 26, 2019	Champion (챔피언)	7.7% (11th)	8.0% (11th)
6	July 26, 2019	Champion (챔피언)	12.3% (2nd)	13.0% (2nd)
7	July 27, 2019	About Fears (두려움에 대하여)	8.0% (8th)	8.5% (6th)
8	July 27, 2019	About Fears (두려움에 대하여)	11.2% (3rd)	11.3% (4th)
9	August 2, 2019	21g, The Weight of the Soul (21그램, 영혼의 무게)	8.5% (7th)	9.3% (8th)
10	August 2, 2019	21g, The Weight of the Soul (21그램, 영혼의 무게)	10.8% (3rd)	11.5% (3rd)
11	August 3, 2019	World Without Pain (고통 없는 세계)	6.9% (11th)	7.6% (7th)
12	August 3, 2019	World Without Pain (고통 없는 세계)	9.2% (4th)	10.2% (3rd)
13	August 9, 2019	Secrets and Lies (비밀과 거짓말)	7.9% (8th)	8.2% (8th)
14	August 9, 2019	Secrets and Lies (비밀과 거짓말)	10.3% (4th)	11.2% (3rd)
15	August 10, 2019	Understanding Someone (누군가를 이해한다는 것은)	7.3% (12th)	8.4% (6th)
16	August 10, 2019	Understanding Someone (누군가를 이해한다는 것은)	10.1% (4th)	11.3% (3rd)
17	August 16, 2019	Terminal: Terminal and Incurable (Terminal: 말기의, 불치의)	7.2% (11th)	7.9% (10th)
18	August 16, 2019	Terminal: Terminal and Incurable (Terminal: 말기의, 불치의)	9.2% (7th)	9.5% (7th)
19	August 17, 2019	Foreboding on a Crisp Afternoon (화창한 오후의 불길한 예감)	6.5% (16th)	7.1% (10th)
20	August 17, 2019	Foreboding on a Crisp Afternoon (화창한 오후의 불길한 예감)	9.4% (3rd)	9.9% (3rd)
21	August 23, 2019	Consolation (위로)	7.5% (9th)	8.4% (8th)
22	August 23, 2019	Consolation (위로)	9.2% (5th)	9.9% (5th)
23	August 24, 2019	Schrödinger's Cat (슈뢰딩거의 고양이)	5.5% (18th)	5.9% (15th)
24	August 24, 2019	Schrödinger's Cat (슈뢰딩거의 고양이)	8.0% (4th)	8.8% (3rd)
25	August 30, 2019	The Promise to Try (노력한다는 그 약속)	7.1% (10th)	8.1% (8th)
26	August 30, 2019	The Promise to Try (노력한다는 그 약속)	8.6% (6th)	9.0% (6th)
27	August 31, 2019	A Certain Choice (어떤 선택)	5.5% (18th)	6.1% (11th)
28	August 31, 2019	A Certain Choice (어떤 선택)	8.8% (3rd)	9.8% (3rd)
29	September 6, 2019	The Heart of the One Who Leaves (떠나는 사람의 마음)	6.3% (14th)	7.1% (11th)
30	September 6, 2019	The Heart of the One Who Leaves (떠나는 사람의 마음)	8.1% (7th)	8.7% (5th)
31	September 7, 2019	Farewell, I Hope to Meet You Again Someday (이별은, 언젠가 다시 만나길 바라는)	6.7% (17th)	7.3% (18th)
32	September 7, 2019	Farewell, I Hope to Meet You Again Someday (이별은, 언젠가 다시 만나길 바라는)	10.2% (6th)	11.3% (3rd)
Average			8.3%	9.0%

== Awards and nominations ==
Year	Award	Category	Recipient	Result	Ref.
2019	12th Korea Drama Awards	Excellence Award (Actor)	Lee Kyu-hyung	Won	
2019	27th SBS Drama Awards	Top Excellence Award in Miniseries (Actor)	Ji Sung	Nominated	
2019	27th SBS Drama Awards	Excellence Award in Miniseries (Actor)	Lee Kyu-hyung	Nominated	
2019	27th SBS Drama Awards	Excellence Award in Miniseries (Actress)	Lee Se-young	Won	
2019	27th SBS Drama Awards	Best Couple Award	Ji Sung and Lee Se-young	Nominated	
2019	27th SBS Drama Awards	Child Actor Award	Yoon Chan-young	Won	
