= Tale of the Nine Tailed =

2020 South Korea television series

- Promotional poster
- Also known as: Tale of the Gumiho; The Tale of a Gumiho
- Hangul: 구미호뎐
- Hanja: 九尾狐傳
- Lit.: Tale of the Nine-Tailed Fox
- RR: Gumihodyeon
- MR: Kumihodyŏn
- Genre: Fantasy; Action; Romance; Drama; Suspense; Horror
- Created by: Lee Myung-han (tvN)
- Developed by: Studio Dragon
- Written by: Han Woo-ri
- Directed by: Kang Shin-hyo; Jo Nam-hyung
- Starring: Lee Dong-wook; Jo Bo-ah; Kim Bum
- Opening theme: "Blue Moon" by Kim Jong-wan
- Composer: Hong Dae-sung
- Country of origin: South Korea
- Original language: Korean
- No. of episodes: 16

Production
- Executive producers: Yoon Dong-yeol; Shin seon-joo; Ra Bo-ra
- Producers: Park Jin-hyung; Park Seung-woo
- Running time: 65–70 minutes
- Production companies: Studio Dragon; How Pictures

Original release
- Network: tvN
- Release: October 7 – December 3, 2020

Related
- Tale of the Nine Tailed 1938

Tale of the Nine Tailed (Korean: 구미호뎐) is a 2020 South Korean television series starring Lee Dong-wook, Jo Bo-ah, and Kim Bum. It aired on tvN from October 7 to December 3, 2020, every Wednesday and Thursday at 22:30 (KST) with 16 episodes.

On November 18, 2020, the series took a one-week break from airing to ensure better production for the remaining four episodes, and aired a behind-the-scene special titled Tale of the Nine Tailed: A 600 Year Legend (구미호뎐-600년의 전설; Gumihodyeon-600nyeonui jeonseol). From November 18 to December 4, it also aired a three-part spin-off titled Tale of the Nine Tailed: An Unfinished Story (구미호뎐: 못다한 이야기; Gumihodyeon: motdahan iyagi), centering around Lee Yeon's younger brother Lee Rang and his accomplice Ki Yu-ri.

A second season, titled Tale of the Nine Tailed 1938 premiered on May 6, 2023 with Lee Dong-wook and Kim Bum reprising their roles and the female lead set to be portrayed by Kim So-yeon, as well as several new cast members like Ryu Kyung-soo.

A South Korean animated series, titled Tale of the Nine Tailed Tiger: The Beginning of a Lotus (Korean: 구미호뎐: 연의 시작) will be released on TVING in 2024, the series is produced by Studio Bazooka.

== Synopsis ==
Lee Yeon (Lee Dong-wook), an over 1000-year-old Gumiho and the former guardian mountain spirit of Baekdu-daegan, is now a city dweller. He works with Taluipa (Kim Jung-nan), an agent in the Afterlife Immigration Office and the protector of the Samdo River, to eradicate supernatural beings that threaten the mortal world. He lives in the city where he is assisted by his loyal subject, veterinarian, and fellow Gumiho, Goo Shin-joo (Hwang Hee).

On a mission to capture a fox that has killed and eaten the livers of many humans and is now marrying a man in the guise of a human woman, he is spotted by Nam Ji-ah (Jo Bo-ah), a smart, ferocious, and dauntless producer at TVC Station.

Ji-ah recognizes Yeon when he is leaving the venue and later spots him on camera through his red, distinctly marked umbrella. She finds where Yeon lives, suspects him of being supernatural, and ultimately tests her theory by jumping off of his flat with a memory chip that contains a video of Yeon fighting another fox (Lee Rang, his half-brother) with their powers, forcing Yeon to follow and save her.

It is then revealed that as a child, on her ninth birthday, Nam Ji-ah was involved in a road accident in which her parents were supposed to be dead. However, Ji-ah is the only one who remembers that two other people, not human, posed as her parents. They were foxes trying to eat Ji-ah but she was saved by Lee Yeon. Even though he compelled her to forget him, the magic did not work on her. Later, she found herself at the accident site but her parents' bodies were never discovered.

It motivated her to believe that her parents were alive and so she decided to look into supernatural beings and look for any way to find and rescue her parents.

Later in the series, it is revealed that Nam Ji-ah is the reincarnation of Ah-eum, a human who was the first love of Yeon.

She died at the hands of Yeon while trying to save him from Imoogi, an evil earth dragon who wanted to inhabit the body of the guardian mountain spirit. By abusing his powers, a heartbroken Yeon stopped the boat carrying Ah-eum across the Samdo River, kissed her, and gave her a fox bead while asking her to promise to be reincarnated. In return, he promised Ah-eum that whenever she came back, he would find her through the bead.

Throughout centuries, Yeon encountered several lookalikes of Ah-eum but none bore the fox bead.

The story progresses as Lee Yeon tries to fight his growing attraction to Nam Ji-ah despite the absence of the fox bead, his investigation as to why Ji-ah not only looks like Ah-eum but also resembles her habits, and his reaction upon discovering that she indeed is his first love.

Meanwhile, Yeon has to deal with Lee Rang (Kim-Bum), his half-brother who felt abandoned when Yeon abdicated his post as guardian mountain spirit to work with Taluipa in exchange for Ah-eum's reincarnation. Rang develops a deep grudge against his brother for choosing Ah-eum over him and being the mountain's protector. With the assistance of Ki Yu-ri (Kim Yong-ji), he continuously harms human beings as a way of antagonizing his brother.

In this mix is added the also reincarnated earth dragon. Imoogi is back and this time, he wants not only Yeon's body but also Ji-ah's heart.

With so many humans, demons, and supernatural beings standing between their reunion, just how the nine-tailed mountain spirit and fierce production director will protect their love, pacify the broken hearts around them, and beat the hellish being that craves their bodies, hearts, and lives makes up the rest of the story.

== Cast ==
=== Main ===
- Lee Dong-wook as Lee Yeon

The titular gumiho (nine-tailed fox). Former mountain spirit and guardian of Baekdudaegan, lover of Ah-eum / Ji-ah and half-brother of Lee Rang. He carries out missions from the Afterlife Immigration Office while searching for the reincarnation of Ah-eum. He encountered several look-alikes of Ah-eum but none bore the fox bead. He saved Ji-ah when she was young, but she does not have the fox bead, making Yeon believe that she is not the reincarnation of Ah-eum. Later in the series, it is revealed that Ji-ah is indeed reincarnation of Ah-eum. Her fox bead appeared when Lee Yeon saved her from falling from a building. His weakness is the evening primrose that grows above tombs.

- Jo Bo-ah as Nam Ji-ah / Yi Ah-eum / Imoogi
  - Park Da-yeon as young Ji-ah / Ah-eum

Nam Ji-ah is a 30-year producer at TVC Station. She is the reincarnation of Lee Yeon's past lover, Yi Ah-eum, the 7th daughter of the King of Joseon whom he exiled. To save her father, who was possessed by the Imoogi, she allowed the Imoogi to take her instead, promising to take him to Yeon. She then asked Lee Yeon to kill her so that she could protect him from sacrificing himself. After reincarnating as Nam Ji-ah, she is often seen to have double personalities, who is later revealed to be the part of the Imoogi that survived inside of her. Imoogi used her to threaten Lee Yeon, in order to have his body. When she tried to sacrifice herself again to protect Yeon from Imoogi, she was stopped by him and allowed Imoogi to take over his body instead.

- Kim Bum as Lee Rang
  - Lee Joo-won as young Lee Rang

A half-blood gumiho and Lee Yeon's younger brother, who seeks revenge on his brother by creating mischief. He intentionally causes harm to humans, which causes trouble to Yeon in turn. He hides his caring nature while harboring a deep grudge for his brother. As a child, he was abandoned by his human mother in the Forest of the Hungry Ghosts. There, he was attacked by hungry ghosts but was saved by Yeon. He followed his brother to the mountain to start anew and lived happily. But when Ah-eum died, Yeon left Baekdudaegan and abdicated his status as the mountain spirit, leaving Rang alone on the mountain, thus causing the growing hatred for Lee Yeon.

=== Supporting ===
==== Mythical beings around Lee Yeon ====
- Kim Jung-nan as Taluipa

Younger sister of King Yeomra (supreme ruler of the underworld), and wife of Hyunuiong. She works at the Afterlife Immigration Office managing the list of dead souls and gives missions to Lee Yeon. She appears to be cold-hearted but has a strict motherly affection for Yeon who calls her "Granny" in return. She had a son named Bok-gil who cannot undergo reincarnation because he committed suicide by jumping into the Samdo River, as a result of her decision to kill his beloved woman infected with the plague.

- Ahn Gil-kang as Hyunuiong

The gatekeeper of Samdo River, the husband of Taluipa and father of Bok-gil. He also works at the Afterlife Immigration Office and briefs dead souls before entering the underworld. He appears to be both obedient and scared of his wife, who "wooed" him in debased parodies of the folktale Fairy and the Woodcutter and the Korean drama I'm Sorry, I Love You, before committing bossam (forcefully marrying him).

- Hwang Hee as Goo Shin-joo

Lee Yeon's loyal subject and friend, also a gumiho. After having bewitched innocent humans to lose their minds in revenge for his sisters who were killed by human traps, he fled from the former mountain spirit he served to save his life and ended up at Lee Yeon's forest. He was saved by Lee Yeon, who refused to return him to the mountain spirit and since then decided to dedicate his life for him. In present day, he is a veterinarian who can speak to animals using his magic necklace. He liked Ki Yu-ri from the first time he met her, when she stole his necklace.

- Kim Soo-jin as Snail Bride / Bok Hye-ja

Owner of the "Snail Bride", a traditional Korean cuisine restaurant where Lee Yeon and Nam Ji-ah's team at TVC Station usually dines in. She's a widow living for hundreds of years already, and is knowledgeable about all the supernatural beings in the world. Her husband was devoured by a tiger through the Spirit of Darkness's trick on someone's greatest fear.

==== Mythical beings around Lee Rang ====
- Kim Yong-ji as Ki Yu-ri

Lee Rang's loyal accomplice, a young gumiho from Russia. Five years prior to the current events she was saved by Rang from a zoo where she was being maltreated. As her way of payment for saving her life, she eagerly carries out Rang's orders in causing trouble to his enemies. She assumed the identity of the 24-year-old director of Moze Department Store who died while trekking in Nepal.

- Lee Tae-ri as adult Imoogi / Lee Ryong / Terry
  - Kim Tae-yul as young Imoogi

A serpent beast in human form, the nemesis of Lee Yeon, who has the power to read others' minds. He was born in Silla as the 9th son of a Jingol family, but with physical deformities similar to a snake. His father considered him a monster that needed to be got rid off, and on the advice of a midwife who stopped him for fear the child might be cursed, on a certain day of a leap month of a leap year, he was sealed up in a cave used to dispose of plague victims, who promptly devoured the child and transformed him into a white serpent. To escape his dark prison, (similar to Korean folklore) he waited beneath the waters for 1,000 years to become a dragon but was disqualified after a human spotted him as he was about to ascend, turning him into an Imoogi. The first person to treat the Imoogi with kindness was Taluipa & Hyunuiong's son Bok-gil, but not wanting to see his happiness, infected Bok-gil's lover with the plague, causing him to lose his mind and commit suicide at Samdo River. To satisfy his ambition of becoming a mountain spirit, he then possesses the body of the King of Joseon, Ah-eum's father, as host. To save her father, Ah-eum allowed the Imoogi to possess her body for him to meet Yeon, who killed him while inside of Ah-eum. Centuries later he eventually washed up at Eohwa Island in 1959 during Typhoon Sarah as an "impure thing" and was thrown into a covered well. To be resurrected, the island's shaman lured young women as human sacrifice every 15th day of the 7th lunar month; and despite the failed sacrifice of Ji-ah, was eventually reborn (with the help of Kwon Hae-ryong and Lee Rang) through her spilled blood, all but one of the residents of Eohwa Island, and inadvertently Lee Yeon's powers. As a child, the Imoogi sucks his babysitters' life force (turning them into mummified corpses) as his meal to be fully grown in a short period of time, and as an adult assumes the physical appearance of Bok-gil. His new goal now is to possess the body of Lee Yeon and be the new mountain spirit of Baekdudaegan, with Nam Ji-ah as his bride. With the help of his servant, the CEO at TVC Station, he disguised himself as Terry, an intern in Ji-ah's team at TVC Station. Similar to Korean folklore his weakness is horse blood, and the method of his resurrection is the same method to fully vanquish him.

- Jung Si-yul as Kim Soo-oh

A young boy who is adopted by Lee Rang. In his previous life, he was Geomdung, the black puppy raised by Lee Rang which was given to him by his brother Lee Yeon, and he died due to a fire set by humans in the mountains 600 years ago. Soo-oh first appeared as a kid at the park met by Lee Yeon. Later on, Soo-oh immediately recognized Lee Rang at the sidewalk, though Lee Rang initially does not reciprocate. Soo-oh found the Eyebrows of the Tiger in the form of glasses which can make its wearer see the past life of another. Rang retrieved it from him and upon wearing, discovered Soo-oh is indeed the reincarnation of his beloved Geomdung. Later on, he was saved by Rang from his abusive step-father.

==== People around Nam Ji-ah ====
- Um Hyo-sup as Kwon Hae-ryong

The CEO of TVC Station, who is secretly the Imoogi's mysterious servant. He served during the reign of Ah-eum's father. As he sacrificed his wife and children to the Imoogi in exchange for extending his life, he is described as a living corpse, since he prolonged his life for centuries by consuming human spirits trapped in bladder cherries (in Korean folklore lured snakes). He also saved Lee Rang's life after he was supposedly killed by Yeon, thereby making Rang indebted to him. He, as a man in a navy blue suit with the criminal branding "Seogyeong" ("Western Capital", which was Pyongyang during the Goryeo period; the punishment rendered towards surviving rebels involved in Myocheong's Rebellion, whose headquarters were located at said area) on his forehead, caused the car accident of Nam Ji-ah's parents. He eventually betrays the Imoogi, and is in turn killed by him while possessing Ji-ah's body.

- Jung Yi-seo as Kim Sae-rom

A writer at TVC Station and Ji-ah's teammate. In her past life, she was Ah-eum's handmaiden during her exile, and she was killed by her mistress while possessed by the Imoogi.

- Kim Kang-min as Pyo Jae-hwan

A PD assistant at TVC Station and Ji-ah's teammate. In his past life, he was Ah-eum's personal eunuch during her exile, and he was killed by his mistress while possessed by the Imoogi.

- Joo Suk-tae as Choi Tae-suk

Team leader of Nam Ji-ah, Kim Sae-rom and Pyo Jae-hwan, who woos Bok Hye-ja. He is revealed to be the reincarnation of Bok Hye-ja's deceased husband.

- Kim Hee-jung as Lee Young-sun

Nam Ji-ah's mother who is a doctor. She went missing since the Yeou Gogae accident 20 years ago and revealed to be turned into a bladder cherry along with her husband. She and her husband were eventually released from her otherworldly prison through Lee Yeon & Lee Rang's help.

- Song Young-kyu as Nam Jong-soo

Nam Ji-ah's father who is a professor. He went missing since the Yeou Gogae accident 20 years ago and revealed to be turned into a bladder cherry along with his wife. He and his wife were eventually released from her otherworldly prison through Lee Yeon & Lee Rang's help.

==== Other mythical beings ====
- Shim So-young as the Spirit of Darkness, the Imoogi's partner who preys on someone's greatest fear. She appears as a lady peddler in a green outfit, targeting her victims by giving away bottled juice for free, then showing them a door that will open towards their greatest fear with the victims hearing the "Doorkeeper Game" from Ganggangsullae, and as they engross themselves with their own fears they slowly die. She has been part of Korean urban legends but rarely anyone could even recall her name in the present day (which turns out to be her own greatest fear: the fear of being forgotten). Among her victims were Bok Hye-ja's husband and through the Imoogi's bidding, Lee Rang, Nam Ji-ah & Lee Yeon as well. Ultimately, she was killed by Yeon after he tricked her to enter his subconscious and taunted her with her greatest fear (Ep. 8 & 9).
- Woo Hyun as the Jangseung of Yeou Gogae who appears as a mysterious old one-eyed drunkard. He first appeared at a bus stop where Nam Ji-ah was supposed to board a bus that went into a fatal accident later. He annoyingly grabbed Ji-ah's leg to stop her from boarding which also meant saving her life. She volunteered to carry him on her back going home but asked to be dropped off by the side of the road. Later on, he involuntarily gave Rang the lead to obtaining the Eyebrows of the Tiger (Ep. 1 & 5).
- Son Woo-hyeon as Jung Hyun-woo, a security staff at TVC station whose true form is a Bulgasari (Ep. 2, 9 & 16).
- Lee Kyu-hyung as Governor / Moon Bear, a former mountain spirit and best friend of Lee Yeon (Ep. 6 & 15). He currently resides at a Korean folk village with other supernatural spirits under his care playing their parts entertaining tourists. He owned the Mirror of the Moon, one of the four gems of the four mountain spirits. He provided a crucial lead on the disappearance of Nam Ji-ah's parents, revealing that Ji-ah was in fact the actual target in the first place.
- Lim Ki-hong as King Odo Jeollyun, the 10th and last Afterlife judge who is in charge of the Darkness Hell as well as of reincarnation. He would occasionally leave his post to stay in the human world. He is first seen as a mysterious fortune teller with white eyes, who trades powerful objects with the most precious thing in someone's life. Through him, Lee Rang traded his brother Lee Yeon in exchange for the Eyebrows of the Tiger. In turn, Nam Ji-ah traded her fox bead to redeem Lee Yeon (Ep. 6 & 16).
- Lee Jung-min as the bride whose true form is a gumiho. On her wedding day, Lee Yeon pursued her to execute the punishment by death for the crimes she committed against humanity (Ep. 1).

==== Eohwa Island ====
- Kim Young-sun as a shaman who attempted to sacrifice Nam Ji-ah to the Imoogi. She was the one who discovered the Imoogi when he was swept into Eohwa Island and was hidden inside a covered well for safekeeping. She then distributed shamanist folk paintings of the Imoogi disguised as the Dragon King towards the island's fishing community, while also luring young women into the island to be sacrificed for Imoogi's resurrection. In return for her loyalty, she was bestowed long life and youth, until Lee Yeon killed her while rescuing Ji-ah from being sacrificed to the Imoogi (Ep. 2–3).
- Do Yun-jin as Seo Pyung-hee, daughter of Seo Ki-chang. She is the only one who did not mysteriously disappear on the island; however, she is the one who cursed her father's crew-mates with the help of the shaman & Lee Rang (Ep. 2–4).
- Maeng Bong-hak as Seo Ki-chang, father of Seo Pyung-hee, who was murdered and eaten by his crewmates when they were lost at the sea (Ep. 2–3).
- Ji Heon-il as Jin-sik, a fisherman (Ep. 2–3).
- Jang Yong-chul as a fisherman (Ep. 2–3).
- Keum Dong-hyun as a fisherman (Ep. 2–3).
- Kim Gui-seon as fishing boat captain (Ep. 2–3).
- Kim Sun-yool as a mountain spirit bound to a tree. She relayed what scant information she knew about the Imoogi, and was later released by Ji-ah (Ep. 2–3).
- Joo Boo-jin as an elderly woman (Ep. 2–3).
- Park Seung-tae as an elderly woman (Ep. 2–3).

=== Special appearances ===
- Lee Taek-geun as the groom of the disguised gumiho bride (Ep. 1).
- Son Dong-hwa as the groom next door (Ep. 1).
- Chu Ye-jin as Jung Soo-young, a 17-year-old student who was the only survivor of a deadly bus accident at Yeou Gogae, later morphed into Lee Rang as her true form. The real Soo-young was killed (eaten) by Rang (Ep. 1).
- Jang Won-hyung as Baek Si-woo, the detective who investigated the bus accident at Yeou Gogae that killed 5 people (Ep. 1).
- Jang Eui-don as a bus passenger who died in the accident, husband (Ep. 1).
- Yoon Tae-hee as a bus passenger who died in the accident, wife (Ep. 1).
- Kim Hwan-young as son of the bus passengers. He met Lee Rang at a wishing fountain at Moze Department Store before (Ep. 1).
- Yu Jun-won a family member of one of the deceased bus passengers (Ep. 1).
- Choi Sung-woong as funeral hall security (Ep. 1).
- Choi Seung-il as father of the real Ki Yu-ri (Ep. 4).
- Oh Jung-won as mother of the real Ki Yu-ri (Ep. 4).
- Lee Ye-bit as Min-seo, a child ghost (Ep. 4–5).
- Jung Ah-young as Yeon-seo, a child ghost (Ep. 4–5).
- Park No-shik as Min-seo & Yeon-seo's father. He was away at work as a truck driver when his daughters died allegedly by his "negligence" (Ep. 5).
- Kim Nak-gyoon as Min-seo & Yeon-seo's uncle. It was revealed that he sexually molested his nieces while drunk, and while escaping accidentally fell off the veranda to their deaths (Ep. 5).
- Jang Young-hyeon as watch salesman at Brennetano (Ep. 5).
- Jo Hyun-im as Imoogi's first babysitter (Ep. 5).
- Seo Jin-won as Seo Hwan-ho, a baseball player who maltreated a puppy (Ep. 5).
- No Seong-eun as No Hae-sung, a baseball player who maltreated a puppy (Ep. 5).
- Han Chang-hun as Han Tae-soo, a baseball player who maltreated a puppy (Ep. 5).
- Shin Ji-Yeon as Imoogi's final babysitter, his last meal before becoming an adult (Ep. 7).
- Park Su-yeon as Lee Rang's mother who abandoned him. She resented having a child with a gumiho (Ep. 7–8).
- Sunwoo Jae-duk as the King of Joseon, Ah-eum's father, the first host body of the Imoogi. He made a deal with the Imoogi to possess him in exchange for Ah-eum escaping her fate as the Imoogi's sacrifice (Ep. 8).
- Kim Young-sun as Psychiatrist Choi, a friend of Nam Ji-ah's mom. She facilitated Ji-ah's hypnotherapy session when she was 9 years old, which revealed that a part of the Imoogi survived despite Ah-eum's death and reincarnation as Ji-ah (Ep. 8).
- Kim Hyo-myung as Kim Soo-oh's stepfather. Lee Rang led him to be turned into a cherry bladder for Kwon Hae-ryong's consumption (Ep. 11).

== Release ==
The poster of the television series was unveiled by Lee Dong-wook and Jo Bo-ah on September 9, 2020, which was termed as "Rhapsody of intense affection".

== Animated adaptation ==
In 2021, CJ ENM reported that the series will be animated, based on live-action. Produced by Bazooka Studio and directed by Seok Jong-seo who is directing Tooniverse's The Haunted House (known as Shinbi Apartment series), and will be streaming on TVING in 2024. The titled has been revealed as Tale of the Nine Tailed Tiger: The Beginning of a Lotus (Korean: 구미호뎐: 연의 시작).

== Original soundtrack ==
Tale of the Nine Tailed OST

Soundtrack album by Various artists
- Released: 2020
- Genre: Soundtrack
- Languages: Korean; English
- Labels: Stone Music Entertainment; Starship Entertainment

=== Part 1 ===
Released on October 7, 2020
No.	Title	Lyrics	Music	Artist	Length
1.	"Blue Moon"	Jayins	Jayins; Naiv	Kim Jong-wan (Nell)	3:37
2.	"Blue Moon" (Inst.)		Jayins; Naiv		3:37
Total length:					7:14

=== Part 2 ===
Released on October 15, 2020
No.	Title	Lyrics	Music	Artist	Length
1.	"I'll Be There"	Dailog	Dailog	Shownu (Monsta X)	3:28
2.	"I'll Be There" (Inst.)		Dailog		3:28
Total length:					6:56

=== Part 3 ===
Released on October 22, 2020
No.	Title	Lyrics	Music	Artist	Length
1.	"Moonchild Ballad" (월아연가 (月兒戀歌))	DANI; Park Geun-chul; Jung Su-min	Hong Dae-sung; Park Geun-chul; Jung Su-min	Lyn	4:23
2.	"Moonchild Ballad" (Inst.)		Hong Dae-sung; Park Geun-chul; Jung Su-min		4:23
Total length:					8:46

=== Part 4 ===
Released on October 29, 2020
No.	Title	Lyrics	Music	Artist	Length
1.	"Diary of Dawn" (새벽일기)	DANI; Park Geun-chul; Jung Su-min	Park Geun-chul; Jung Su-min	Yang Da-il	4:45
2.	"Diary of Dawn" (Inst.)		Park Geun-chul; Jung Su-min		4:45
3.	"The Legend of the Fox – Tale of the Nine Tailed Opening Title" (여우 전설 (구미호뎐 Opening Title))		Hong Dae-sung		1:00
4.	"Moonchild Ballad – Score Version" (월아연가 (Score Ver.))		Hong Dae-sung		4:17
5.	"Parting at the River of Three Crossings" (삼도천의 이별)		Hong Dae-sung		5:15
6.	"The Fox's Wedding Day (Lee Yeon Theme Song)" (여우가 시집 가는 날 (이연 테마))		Hong Dae-sung		1:34
7.	"The Uninvited" (불청객)		Hong Dae-sung		3:12
8.	"I Waited For You" (나는 너를 기다렸어)		Hong Dae-sung		1:26
9.	"The Nine Tailed Fox" (구미호)		Hong Dae-sung		1:44
10.	"Lightning Bugs" (반딧불이)		Hong Dae-sung		2:53
Total length:					30:51

=== Part 5 ===
Released on November 5, 2020
No.	Title	Lyrics	Music	Artist	Length
1.	"Leaning On You" (비스듬히 너에게)	Shim Hyun-bo	Shim Hyun-bo	Sung Si-kyung	4:02
2.	"Leaning On You" (Inst.)		Shim Hyun-bo		4:02
Total length:					8:04

=== Part 6 ===
Released on November 6, 2020
No.	Title	Lyrics	Music	Artist	Length
1.	"Love Already Bloomed in My Heart" (그대가 꽃이 아니면)	Howl; Park Geun-chul; Jung Su-min	Park Geun-chul; Jung Su-min; Howl	Hynn	3:42
2.	"Love Already Bloomed in My Heart" (Inst.)		Park Geun-chul; Jung Su-min; Howl		3:42
Total length:					7:24

=== Part 7 ===
Released on November 19, 2020
No.	Title	Lyrics	Music	Artist	Length
1.	"Stay With Me"	Dinner Coat	Dinner Coat	YooA (Oh My Girl)	3:27
2.	"Stay With Me" (Inst.)		Dinner Coat		3:27
Total length:					6:54

=== Part 8 ===
Released on November 26, 2020
No.	Title	Lyrics	Music	Artist	Length
1.	"My Destiny"	Dinner Coat; Dong Woo-seok	Dinner Coat; Dong Woo-seok; Yoo Jung-hyun	Miyeon ((G)I-dle)	3:38
2.	"My Destiny" (Inst.)		Dinner Coat; Dong Woo-seok; Yoo Jung-hyun		3:38
Total length:					7:16

== Viewership ==
Tale of the Nine Tailed : South Korea viewers per episode (millions)

Season	Episode number																Average
Season	1	2	3	4	5	6	7	8	9	10	11	12	13	14	15	16	Average
1	1.514	1.539	1.460	1.415	1.467	1.247	1.287	1.493	1.501	1.337	1.348	1.589	1.350	1.411	1.442	1.657	1.441

Source: Audience measurement performed nationwide by Nielsen Korea.

Average TV viewership ratings
Ep.	Original broadcast date	Title	Average audience share (Nielsen Korea)	
Ep.	Original broadcast date	Title	Nationwide	Seoul
1	October 7, 2020	"The Incident That Occurred On Yeou Gogae"	5.804% (1st)	6.479% (1st)
2	October 8, 2020	"I've Been Waiting for You"	5.557% (1st)	6.222% (1st)
3	October 14, 2020	"The Secret of the Dragon King"	5.588% (1st)	5.988% (1st)
4	October 15, 2020	"Verge of Death"	5.511% (1st)	6.075% (1st)
5	October 21, 2020	"I Also Waited For You"	5.100% (1st)	5.352% (1st)
6	October 22, 2020	"Four Pillars of Destiny"	4.962% (1st)	5.800% (1st)
7	October 28, 2020	"The Trap of Samsara"	4.789% (1st)	5.433% (1st)
8	October 29, 2020	"Reincarnation"	5.137% (1st)	5.666% (1st)
9	November 4, 2020	"Spirit of Darkness"	5.115% (1st)	5.623% (1st)
10	November 5, 2020	"Deja-vu"	4.474% (1st)	4.776% (1st)
11	November 11, 2020	"Ground Cherries"	4.863% (1st)	5.010% (1st)
12	November 12, 2020	"Catch the Tail"	5.318% (1st)	5.828% (1st)
13	November 25, 2020	"The Other Imoogi"	5.195% (1st)	6.275% (1st)
14	November 26, 2020	"Dead End"	5.160% (1st)	5.923% (1st)
15	December 2, 2020	"Without Knowing Imoogi's Plan"	5.224% (1st)	6.082% (1st)
16	December 3, 2020	"The Rewritten Tale of the Nine Tailed"	5.785% (1st)	6.436% (1st)
Average			5.286%	5.810%
In the table above, the blue numbers represent the lowest ratings and the red numbers represent the highest ratings.; This drama aired on a cable channel/pay TV which normally has a relatively smaller audience compared to free-to-air TV/public broadcasters (KBS, SBS, MBC and EBS).
