= Run (South Korean TV series) =

Korean television program

- Promotional poster
- Genre: Reality; Variety show
- Directed by: Kim Hyun-sil
- Starring: Ji Sung; Kang Ki-young; Hwang Hee; Lee Tae-sun
- Country of origin: South Korea
- Original language: Korean
- No. of episodes: 4

Production
- Production locations: South Korea; Italy
- Camera setup: Multi-camera
- Running time: 69–78 minutes

Original release
- Network: tvN
- Release: January 2 – January 23, 2020

Run (stylized as RUN) is a 2020 South Korean television entertainment program starring Ji Sung, Kang Ki-young, Hwang Hee and Lee Tae-sun. It aired on tvN on Thursdays at 23:00 (KST) in January 2020.

== Overview ==
Four actors exercise and train in Seoul, Milan and Florence, with the goal of running the full 42.195 km of the 36th Florence Marathon.

== Cast ==
=== Main ===
- Ji Sung
- Kang Ki-young
- Hwang Hee
- Lee Tae-sun

=== Special appearances ===
- Kim Jae-joong (Ep. 1)
- Lee Bong-ju (Ep. 3)

== Results ==
Name	Result	Time	Ref.
Ji Sung	Completed the marathon	4 hours, 9 minutes and 16 seconds	
Kang Ki-young	Stopped after 30 km	-	
Hwang Hee	Completed the marathon	5 hours, 10 minutes and 7 seconds	
Lee Tae-sun	Completed the marathon	4 hours, 38 minutes and 3 seconds	

== Production ==
The filming started in Bukchon Hanok Village, Seoul in October 2019, less than a month before the marathon day.

== Ratings ==
In this table, the blue numbers represent the lowest ratings and the red numbers represent the highest ratings.

Ep.	Original broadcast date	Title	Average audience share
Ep.	Original broadcast date	Title	Nielsen Korea
1	January 2, 2020	Runner (Note: The original title is in English.)	1.022%
2	January 9, 2020	Running Together (함께 달린다는 건)	0.723%
3	January 16, 2020	How to Cheer Myself On (나를 응원하는 법)	0.566%
4	January 23, 2020	42,195km, the Road Not Taken (42.195km, 가보지 않은 길)	0.800%
