= Kang Ae-shim =

South Korean actress (born 1963)

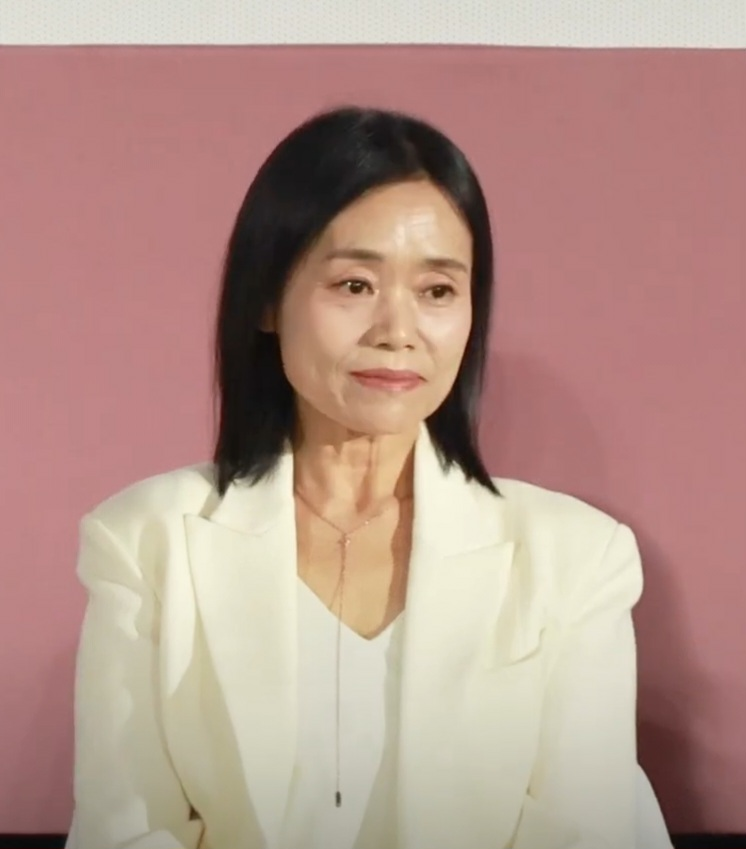
- Kang in 2024 during an interview for Squid Game
- Born: 28 February 1963 (age 63)
- Occupation: Actress

Korean name
- Hangul: 강애심
- Hanja: 康愛心
- RR: Gang Aesim
- MR: Kang Aesim

Kang Ae-shim (Korean: 강애심; born 28 February 1963) is a South Korean actress. She is known for starring in the second and third season of TV drama Squid Game as Jang Geum-ja.

== Filmography ==
=== Film ===
Year	Title	Role	Notes
2006	Old Miss Diary		
2007	Mother		
2008	A Man Who Was Superman		
2010	Secret Love		
2015	Another Way		
2016	Fourth Place		
2018	Mom, Popo, and Me		
2019	Kim Ji-young, Born 1982		
2020	Jessie Story		
2020	A Bedsore		
2021	The ABCs of Our Relationship		
2021	Essay Love		
2021	Outing		
2022	The Dream Songs		
2023	Rebound		
2023	The Childe		
2023	Concrete Utopia		
2023	Spontaneous Human Combustion		
2024	Wonderland	Hae-ri's mother	
2025	Wall to Wall	Nam Hae-ju	

=== Television ===
Year	Title	Role	Notes
2018–2019	Voice		
2019	Beautiful World		
2019	Be Melodramatic		
2019	Birthday Letter		
2019	When the Camellia Blooms		
2019	JTBC Drama Festa		Luwak Human
2019–2020	Diary of a Prosecutor		
2020	Tell Me What You Saw		
2020	Memorials		
2020–2022	No, Thank You		
2021	Move to Heaven		
2021	Mad for Each Other		
2021	Hospital Playlist 2		
2021	You Are My Spring		
2021	Reflection of You		
2021	KBS Drama Special		Ordinary Jae-Hwa
2021–2022	Bad and Crazy		
2022	Rookie Cops		
2022	Thirty-Nine		
2022	Cleaning Up		
2022	Extraordinary Attorney Woo	Choi Yeong-ran	Young-woo's first client
2022	Fly High Butterfly		
2023	Divorce Attorney Shin		
2023	One Day Off		
2023	Unpredictable Family		
2023–2024	Tell Me That You Love Me		
2024	Queen of Divorce	Park Jung-sook	
2024	Wonderful World	Jang Hyung-ja	
2024	Frankly Speaking	Na Yoo-jung	
2024	Romance in the House		
2024	A Virtuous Business	Lee Bok-soon	
2024–2025	Squid Game	Jang Geum-ja (Player 149)	
2025	Oh My Ghost Clients	Kim Young-sook	
2026	Our Universe	Park Ae-ja	
2026	In Your Radiant Season	Kim Sun	
