= Be Melodramatic =

2019 South Korean television series

- Promotional poster
- Also known as: Melo Is My Nature
- Hangul: 멜로가 체질
- Hanja: 멜로가 體質
- Lit.: Melo Suits Me
- RR: Melloga chejil
- MR: Melloga ch'ejil
- Genre: Romantic comedy
- Written by: Lee Byeong-heon; Kim Young-young
- Directed by: Lee Byeong-heon; Kim Hye-young
- Starring: Chun Woo-hee; Jeon Yeo-been; Han Ji-eun; Ahn Jae-hong; Gong Myung
- Country of origin: South Korea
- Original language: Korean
- No. of episodes: 16

Production
- Executive producer: Ham Young-hoon
- Producers: An Jae-hyun; Shin Sang-yoon
- Production company: Samhwa Networks

Original release
- Network: JTBC
- Release: August 9 – September 28, 2019

Be Melodramatic (Korean: 멜로가 체질) is a 2019 South Korean television series starring Chun Woo-hee, Jeon Yeo-been, Han Ji-eun, Ahn Jae-hong and Gong Myung. It aired on cable network JTBC on Fridays and Saturdays at 20:30 from August 9 to September 28, 2019. The drama received a manhwa adaptation.

== Synopsis ==
A romantic comedy that depicts the daily lives of 30-year-old best friends Lim Jin-joo (Chun Woo-hee), Lee Eun-jung (Jeon Yeo-been) and Hwang Han-joo (Han Ji-eun), using a show within a show as the backdrop.

Jin-joo is a writer who gets her first chance to write a 16-episode television series and, in the process, falls for her director, Son Beom Soo (Ahn Jae-hong), and he for her, although not without a number of prickly moments. As Jin-joo writes the show and Beom-soo develops it, their personal and professional lives intertwine in unexpected ways.

Eun-jung is a documentary film maker who has not properly got over the early death of her fiance from cancer. But she is successful professionally. During much of the series, she is making a documentary about a second-tier actress and personality, Lee So Min (Lee Joo-bin), who ends up being considered for a role in Jin-joo and Beom-soo's show.

Han-joo is a single mother who works for a marketing and production company. One of her jobs is to ensure that production companies that have accepted product placements by her company live up to their commitments, a responsibility she executes inventively. She gets promoted and her company ends up working on Jin-joo and Beom-soo's show.

The show features a large ensemble cast and follows the story arcs of many of them.

== Cast ==
=== Main ===
- Chun Woo-hee as Lim Jin-joo

A rookie drama screenwriter. She broke up with Kim Hwan-dong after dating him for seven years.

- Jeon Yeo-been as Lee Eun-jung

A documentary director who is the CEO and only employee of her company. She has persistent complex grief disorder after her boyfriend passed away and often imagines and talks with him.

- Han Ji-eun as Hwang Han-joo

The marketing team leader of a drama production company. She's also a single mother.

- Ahn Jae-hong as Son Beom-soo

A famous drama director who has filmed five consecutive hits, who combines arrogance and insecurity. He decides to make Jin-joo's proposed 16-episode romantic comedy, "When You're 30, It Will Be Okay" after reading her proposal.

- Gong Myung as Chu Jae-hoon

A new employee in Han-joo's marketing team. He has a complicated relationship with his girlfriend Ha-Yoon.

=== Supporting ===
==== People around Jin-joo ====
- Lee You-jin as Kim Hwan-dong

Lim Jin-joo's ex-boyfriend and Son Beom-soo's assistant director.

- Baek Ji-won as Jeong Hye-jeong

Jin-joo's former boss. She is a famous screenwriter in the industry.

- Baek Soo-hee as Lim Ji-yeon

Jin-joo's younger sister.

- Kang Ae-shim

Jin-joo's mother

- Seo Sang-won

Jin-joo's father

==== People around Eun-jung ====
- Yoon Ji-on as Lee Hyo-bong

Eun-jung's younger brother. A drama producer who is close with the three best friends. He is in a relationship with another male producer.

- Han Joon-woo as Hong-dae

Eun-jung's deceased boyfriend. He often appears in her imagination.

- Lee Joo-bin as Lee So-min

She's a top celebrity and Eun-jung's rival. They used to be friends before So-min became famous.

- Ryu Abel as Kim Ah-rang

A documentary director and Eun-jung's friend.

- Park Hyung-soo as President So

President of documentary group.

==== People around Han-joo ====
- Seol Woo-Hyung as Hwang In-kook

Han-joo and Seung-hyo's son. He sometimes struggles with not having his father around.

- Kim Young-ah as Lee So-jin

CEO of the drama production company where Han-joo works.

- Lee Hak-joo as Noh Seung-hyo

Han-joo's ex-husband and In-kook's father. He seduced Han-joo when she was a college student and left her because he wasn't satisfied with his life.

==== People around Beom-soo ====
- Jung Seung-kil as Seong In-jong

Director of the broadcasting company JBC where Beom-soo works.

- Heo Joon-seok as Dong-gi

Beom-soo's co-worker and friend. He often fails in giving Beom-soo good advice.

- Lee Ji-min as Da-mi

She works at JBC's cafeteria and confessed her love to Beom-soo.

- Nam Young-joo as Sol-bi

Beom-soo's ex-girlfriend. She's a lyricist who sometimes works with Hyo-bong.

==== Others ====
- Kim Myung-joon as Lee Min-joon

So-min's manager. He is very dedicated to her and seems to have a crush on her.

- Mi Ram as Ha-yoon

Jae-hoon's on-again off-again girlfriend.

- Song Duk-ho as Chu Jae-hoon's friend

He and Chu are friends.

=== Special appearances ===
- Jin Seon-kyu as actor (Ep. 1)
- Lee Hanee as actress (Ep. 1)
- Kim Do-yeon as herself (Ep. 2–3)
- Weki Meki as themselves (Ep. 3)
- Yang Hyun-min as actor (Ep. 4, 6)
- Son Suk-ku as Kim Sang-soo (Ep. 10, 12–16)
- Jung So-min as Seon-joo (Ep. 16)

== Production ==
Lee Byeong-heon, who co-wrote and co-directed the series, started working on it in 2015 after the release of his coming-of-age film Twenty. He stated that he "wanted to discuss the stories of people, not just women, who were starting anew after coming out of relationships. This story was too much to spin in two hours so [he] opted for a drama format."

The early working title of the series is Yeouido Scandal (여의도 스캔들) . It was originally planned to air on cable channel tvN in 2017 following A Korean Odyssey, however, it did not push through.

The first script reading took place on March 13, 2019 in Sangam-dong, Seoul, South Korea.

On July 12, 2019, actor Oh Seung-yoon, who had been cast for the role of Lee Hyo-bong, was removed from the drama after being booked for aiding and abetting drunk driving. As the crew needed to reshoot all his scenes from episode 1 to 14, the premiere was delayed by two weeks, from July 26 to August 9. On July 19, it was confirmed that Oh Seung-yoon had been replaced by Yoon Ji-on.

== Original soundtrack ==
Be Melodramatic OST

Soundtrack album by Various artists
- Released: 2019
- Genre: Soundtrack
- Languages: Korean; English
- Labels: Samhwa Networks; Genie Music; Stone Music Entertainment

=== Part 1 ===
Released on August 10, 2019
No.	Title	Lyrics	Music	Artist	Length
1.	"Consolation" (위로)	Hen	Hen	Kwon Jin-ah	3:16
2.	"Consolation" (Inst.)		Hen		3:16
Total length:					6:32

=== Part 2 ===
Released on August 17, 2019
No.	Title	Lyrics	Music	Artist	Length
1.	"Undecided" (작가미정)	Shin On-yu	Shin On-yu	Shin In-ryu	3:49
2.	"Undecided" (Inst.)		Shin On-yu		3:49
Total length:					7:38

=== Part 3 ===
Released on August 23, 2019
No.	Title	Lyrics	Music	Artist	Length
1.	"Your Shampoo Scent In The Flowers" (흔들리는 꽃들 속에서 네 샴푸향이 느껴진거야)	Jang Beom-june	Jang Beom-june	Jang Beom-june	2:48
2.	"Your Shampoo Scent In The Flowers" (Inst.)		Jang Beom-june		2:48
Total length:					5:36

=== Part 4 ===
Released on August 31, 2019
No.	Title	Lyrics	Music	Artist	Length
1.	"Fake" (거짓말이네)	Lundi Blues; Hen	Lundi Blues	Yoo Seung-woo	3:10
2.	"Fake" (Inst.)		Lundi Blues		3:10
Total length:					6:20

=== Part 5 ===
Released on September 7, 2019
No.	Title	Lyrics	Music	Artist	Length
1.	"Moonlight"	Kim Cho-yeon	Nodded	Ha Hyun-sang	3:28
2.	"Moonlight" (Inst.)		Nodded		3:28
Total length:					6:56

=== Part 6 ===
Released on September 14, 2019
No.	Title	Lyrics	Music	Artist	Length
1.	"Far From Melo"	ZEEBOMB	ZEEBOMB	ZEEBOMB	4:29
2.	"Far From Melo" (Inst.)		ZEEBOMB		4:29
Total length:					8:58

=== Part 7 ===
Released on September 21, 2019
No.	Title	Lyrics	Music	Artist	Length
1.	"Your Shampoo Scent In The Flowers" (Actors Ver.)	Jang Beom-june	Jang Beom-june	Chun Woo-hee; Ahn Jae-hong	3:21
2.	"Your Shampoo Scent In The Flowers" (Ballad Ver.)	Jang Beom-june	Jang Beom-june	SAya; Jaeyeon	4:46
Total length:					8:07

=== Part 8 ===
Released on September 28, 2019
No.	Title	Lyrics	Music	Artist	Length
1.	"Moonlight" (Cello Ver.)		Nodded	Hong Jin-ho	3:30
2.	"Slow Step"	Lee Ha-jin	MILO	Jion Yun; Nam Young-joo	3:49
3.	"Smells"	Choi Jung-in; MILO	MILO	Nam Young-joo	3:03
4.	"Fake" (Folk Ver.)	Lundi Blues; Hen	Lundi Blues	Lundi Blues	3:12
Total length:					13:34

== Ratings ==
Be Melodramatic : South Korea viewers per episode (thousands)

Season	Episode number																Average
Season	1	2	3	4	5	6	7	8	9	10	11	12	13	14	15	16	Average
1	N/A	N/A	N/A	N/A	N/A	N/A	N/A	N/A	N/A	N/A	N/A	N/A	N/A	N/A	N/A	425	N/A

Source: Audience measurement performed nationwide by Nielsen Media Research.

Average TV viewership ratings
Ep.	Original broadcast date	Title	AGB Nielsen (nationwide)
1	August 9, 2019	I'm Not Going to Like Something Like Love (나는 사랑 같은 거 안 해)	1.790%
2	August 10, 2019	If He's a Director, Shouldn't He Have a Girlfriend? The Thing is He Has No Luck^^ (감독이면 여친 없겠네요? 재수 없어서^^)	1.035%
3	August 16, 2019	Are You on the Side of the Man I Like? (제가 좋아하는 남자 쪽에 속하나요?)	1.723%
4	August 17, 2019	Are You Going to Transfer? What a Philanthropist! (갈아탈 텐가? 이런 박애주의자!)	1.531%
5	August 23, 2019	It's Not Going to Be Easy, But It's Going to Be a Lot of Fun. Good Luck to Us (쉽진 않겠지만 엄청 재밌을거예요. 잘해봐요 우리)	1.596%
6	August 24, 2019	You're Growing on Me. You're Growing on Me... (정 들었어요. 정 들었다고...)	1.478%
7	August 30, 2019	Can I Kiss You? Only Kiss! (키스해도 돼요? 키스만!)	1.544%
8	August 31, 2019	I Don't Know How I Used to Be... (모르겠어 내가 어땠는지...)	1.190%
9	September 6, 2019	Why Are You Hesitating, Are You Excited, By Any Chance? (뭘 망설여, 설레고 그러냐 혹시?)	1.521%
10	September 7, 2019	Is Something Making You Jealous? (뭔가 질투가 난달까?)	1.849%
11	September 13, 2019	There's Something I Need to Figure Out... My Heart That Likes the Writer (해결해야 될 일이 있어요… 작가님 좋아하는 내 마음)	1.016%
12	September 14, 2019	Love Is The Best Thing In The World (사랑은 세상에서 제일 좋은 것)	1.324%
13	September 20, 2019	Why Are You Getting Out of There...? (네가 거기서 왜 나와...?)	1.270%
14	September 21, 2019	Do You Want Me to Hug You? It's Hard For You... (내가 안아줄까요? 당신 힘드니까...)	1.651%
15	September 27, 2019	Today I Should Be a Little Disappointed (오늘은 좀 실망을 해야겠어요)	1.489%
16	September 28, 2019	I've Stayed By My Whole Life At This Temperature (지금 정도의 온도로 평생 옆에 있어♡)	1.803%
Average			1.488%
In the table above, the blue numbers represent the lowest ratings and the red numbers represent the highest ratings.; This drama aired on a cable channel/pay TV which normally has a relatively smaller audience compared to free-to-air TV/public broadcasters (KBS, SBS, MBC and EBS).

== Awards and nominations ==
Year	Award	Category	Recipient	Result	Ref.
2019	11th Melon Music Awards	Best OST	"Your Shampoo Scent In The Flowers" (Jang Beom-jun)	Nominated	
2019	21st Mnet Asian Music Awards	Best OST	"Your Shampoo Scent In The Flowers" (Jang Beom-jun)	Nominated	
2020	56th Baeksang Arts Awards	Best New Actress (TV)	Jeon Yeo-been	Nominated	
