= The Bequeathed =

2024 South Korean television series

- Promotional poster
- Hangul: 선산
- Hanja: 先山
- Lit.: Family Burial Ground
- RR: Seonsan
- MR: Sŏnsan
- Genre: Occult; Thriller; Suspense; Horror
- Created by: Yeon Sang-ho
- Based on: The Bequeathed by Kang Tae-kyung
- Written by: Yeon Sang-ho; Min Hong-nam; Hwang Eun-young
- Directed by: Min Hong-nam
- Starring: Kim Hyun-joo; Park Hee-soon; Park Byung-eun; Ryu Kyung-soo
- Music by: Chae Min-joo; Kim Dong-wook
- Country of origin: South Korea
- Original language: Korean
- No. of episodes: 6

Production
- Producers: Yang Yoo-min; Lee Dong-ha; Ahn Seung-ho
- Cinematography: Lee Eui-tae
- Editor: Han Mi-yeon
- Running time: 39–56 minutes
- Production companies: Wow Point; RedPeter Films

Original release
- Network: Netflix
- Release: January 19, 2024

The Bequeathed (Korean: 선산) is a 2024 South Korean occult thriller television series created and written by Yeon Sang-ho with Min Hong-nam and Hwang Eun-young, directed by Min, and starring Kim Hyun-joo, Park Hee-soon, Park Byung-eun, and Ryu Kyung-soo. Based on the webtoon of the same name by Kang Tae-kyung. It was released on Netflix on January 19, 2024, and received generally positive reviews.

== Synopsis ==
Yoon Seo-ha, a college lecturer, is surprised to learn that her long-forgotten paternal uncle has died, leaving her as the sole heir to the family's burial ground. This news brings back painful memories of her father who abandoned her and her mother. At the uncle's funeral, Seo-ha's half-brother, Kim Young-ho, demands inclusion in the inheritance. The situation triggers a series of ominous events, causing her immense unease. Meanwhile, police detective Choi Sung-jun discovers that the murder case is not a simple manslaughter case. He investigates the case, which is elusive and leads to many dead ends. Park Sang-min, the chief inspector, disapproves of Sung-jun and excludes him from the case. However, his investigation, which focused on key persons surrounding the burial ground, leads nowhere. Another murder occurs, and the village is turned upside down.

== Cast and characters ==
=== Main ===
- Kim Hyun-joo as Yoon Seo-ha
  - Kim Ji-an as teenage Yoon Seo-ha
  - Kim Min-chae as young Yoon Seo-ha

A college instructor who hopes to upgrade her hourly status to a faculty position as an appointed professor.

- Park Hee-soon as Choi Sung-jun

A detective with a keen sense of investigation from Namil Police Station's homicide team.

- Park Byung-eun as Park Sang-min

Chief inspector of homicide team at Namil Police Station.

- Ryu Kyung-soo as Kim Young-ho
  - Park Jae-joon as young Kim Young-ho

Seo-ha's half-brother who wants to inherit their family's burial ground.

=== Supporting ===
- Cha Mi-kyung as Yoon Myung-hee
  - Joo Hae-eun as young Yoon Myung-hee

A grandmother from Jinseong-ri village and Young-ho's biological mother.

- Yoo Seung-mok as Choi Tae-song

A building owner who tries to convince Seo-ha to buy his building.

- Hyun Bong-sik as President Kang Hong-sik

A private detective hired by Seo-ha to catch her husband's affair.

- Kim Jae-bum as Yuk Sung-soo

The chief of Jinseong-ri village.

- Lee Hyun-kyun as Jin Dae-su

A detective at Namil Police Station.

- Cha Si-won as Kim Jung-hyun

A detective at Namil Police Station.

- Jung In-gi as Professor Kim Chang-seok
- Choi Yu-hwa as Professor Han Na-rae
- Kim Ho-yeon as Yoon Myung-ho

Seo-ha and Young-ho's father.

- Shim Hyun-seo as Choi Joon-hyung

Sung-jun's son.

- Kim Jae-geon as Yoon Myung-gil

The owner of the burial ground and Seo-ha's uncle.

- Yeo Moo-young as Seo-ha's grandfather
- Park Joo-yong as a detective
- Seo Mun-ho as a detective
- Lee Yeong-seok as an old man working in kiln
- Baek Soo-ryeon as a buddhist nun's teacher
- Shin Bok-sook as a buddhist nun
- Choi Dong-goo as Kim Kwang-soo

A development team leader at Jijo Construction.

- Lee Yoon-hee as a chief of police
- Hong Suk-bin as a medical examiner
- Kim Seong-nyeo as a tavern owner's older sister
- Lee Soo-mi as a tavern owner
- Nam Ji-bok as Kim Jung-tae
- Kang Jin-ah as Seo Ha-mo
- Park Jin-ah as a shaman

=== Special appearance ===
- Park Sung-hoon as Yang Jae-seok

Seo-ha's husband.

== Episodes ==
No.	Title	Directed by	Written by	Original release date
1	"Episode 1"	Min Hong-nam	Yeon Sang-ho, Min Hong-nam & Hwang Eun-young	January 19, 2024
2	"Episode 2"	Min Hong-nam	Yeon Sang-ho, Min Hong-nam & Hwang Eun-young	January 19, 2024
3	"Episode 3"	Min Hong-nam	Yeon Sang-ho, Min Hong-nam & Hwang Eun-young	January 19, 2024
4	"Episode 4"	Min Hong-nam	Yeon Sang-ho, Min Hong-nam & Hwang Eun-young	January 19, 2024
5	"Episode 5"	Min Hong-nam	Yeon Sang-ho, Min Hong-nam & Hwang Eun-young	January 19, 2024
6	"Episode 6"	Min Hong-nam	Yeon Sang-ho, Min Hong-nam & Hwang Eun-young	January 19, 2024

== Production ==
In October 2022, Kim Hyun-joo, Park Hee-soon, Park Byung-eun, and Ryu Kyung-soo were cast to play various roles for the Netflix series The Bequeathed which is created and written by director Yeon Sang-ho, and the production is managed by Wow Point, a global content production company and RedPeter Films, a film company that created movies such as Peninsula (2020), Another Child (2019), Birthday (2019), Psychokinesis (2018) and Train to Busan (2016).

In December 2023, it was announced that director Min Hong-nam who assisted Yeon in the film Train to Busan is set to debut his directorial work, co-written by Yeon together with Min and Hwang Eun-young.

== Release ==
The series was released exclusively on Netflix on January 19, 2024.

== Reception ==
=== Critical response ===
On the review aggregator website Rotten Tomatoes, 83% of 6 critics' reviews are positive, with an average rating of 6.3/10. Christopher Cross of Asynchronous Media stated that the series "is an even, but ultimately satisfying procedural that leaves plenty on the table in its search for narrative closure". Jonathan Wilson of Ready Steady Cut rated it a 3/5 and said that "don't go in expecting Train to Busan and you won't leave disappointed, but you probably won't be thrilled either". Pierce Conrad of South China Morning Post rated it a 3/5 and stated that it "draws us in quickly with its atmosphere but the mystery of its central premise soon loses its lustre" and "viewers looking for full-on supernatural horror may be wise to readjust their expectations". Kate Sánchez of But Why Tho? stated that the series "blends shamanism with a supernatural edge and classic detective noir storytelling to craft something unique" and overall it "expertly uses genre storytelling and a deep human focus to thrill its audience both in flashbacks and in the present-day timeline". Ronak Kotecha of The Times of India rated it a 2.5/5 and stated that it "succumbs to a sluggish pace, challenging the viewer's patience". Stephanie Morgan of Common Sense Media stated that the series' "uninspired writing will only appeal to diehard fans of horror and mystery, leaving other viewers underwhelmed".

Pushpangi Raina of Outlook India rated it a 2.5/5 and stated that "the show stings so much after much-anticipation because the plot was there, the story was there, actors were decent, but the ending really made me get up and think 'Is that it?'" and "leaves you with only questions, with no scope for answers". Rhian Daly of NME rated it a 3/5 and stated that "the main focus of the show, meanwhile, is let down by muddy and convoluted storytelling that rips away the power from the eerie scene-setting", continuing that "everything is largely predictable, which leaves the horror being played out on screen feeling more like a balloon slowly, sadly leaking out air than one commanding your attention (and fear) with a sudden pop", and "despite some strong performances from the actors, though, [The Bequeathed] doesn't come close to living up to the expectations around it". Nandini Iyengar of Bollywood Hungama stated that "there was a lot of potential that went unchecked as the makers tried to fit in more stories in a limited time".

=== Viewership ===
The Bequeathed ranked fourth in Netflix's Global Top 10 TV (Non-English) category after three days of its release and received a warm response in 10 countries being listed in the Top 10 including South Korea, Hong Kong, Indonesia, the Philippines, Qatar, and Singapore. The following week, the series topped the chart with 14.5 million hours watched by 3.1 million viewers, and remained on the chart for another week.

=== Accolades ===
Name of the award ceremony, year presented, category, nominee of the award, and the result of the nomination
Award ceremony	Year	Category	Nominee / Work	Result	Ref.
Baeksang Arts Awards	2024	Best Supporting Actor	Ryu Kyung-soo	Nominated	
