= Handsome Tigers =

South Korean television show

- Hangul: 진짜 농구 핸섬타이거즈
- RR: Jinjja nonggu haenseom taigeojeu
- MR: Chintcha nonggu haensŏm t'aigŏjŭ
- Genre: Reality show Basketball
- Directed by: Ahn Jae-cheol; Jo Young-jae; Yoon Jong-ho; Kim Eun-ji
- Starring: Seo Jang-hoon; Joy; Lee Sang-yoon; Kim Seung-hyun; Seo Ji-seok; Julien Kang; Shorry; Kang Kyung-joon; Moon Su-inn; Lee Tae-sun; Cha Eun-woo; Yoo Seon-ho; Kang In-soo; Jeon Ji-hoon
- Country of origin: South Korea
- Original language: Korean
- No. of seasons: 1
- No. of episodes: 12

Production
- Production location: South Korea
- Running time: 90 minutes

Original release
- Network: SBS
- Release: January 10 – March 27, 2020

Handsome Tigers (Korean: 진짜 농구 핸섬타이거즈) is a South Korean basketball reality show program. It aired on SBS every Friday at 11:10 PM KST.

== Overview ==
A real basketball entertainment program that surrounds former basketball legend Seo Jang-hoon, where celebrities who love basketball are recruited to form a basketball team. The team gets trained by Seo and then eventually participates in a tournament.

== Cast ==
=== Coach ===
- Seo Jang-hoon

=== Manager ===
- Joy (Red Velvet)

=== Players ===
- Lee Sang-yoon - No. 7 (Captain)
- Kim Seung-hyun - No. 11
- Seo Ji-seok - No. 23
- Julien Kang - No. 32
- Shorry J (Mighty Mouth) - No. 8
- Kang Kyung-joon - No. 42
- Moon Su-inn - No. 10 (Ace Player)
- Lee Tae-sun - No. 3
- Cha Eun-woo (Astro) - No. 97
- Yoo Seon-ho - No. 30
- Kang In-soo - No. 1
- Jeon Ji-hoon - No. 37

== Match schedules ==
Match	Air date	Opposing team	Venue	Results	Ref
1	January 10, 2020	Whimoon Middle School	Kyung Hee University	Lost (66 : 88)	
2	January 24, 2020	Project Ball	Yonsei University	Lost (36 : 60)	
3	January 31, 2020	Goyang City Hall Team	Goyang Gymnasium	Lost (53 : 58)	
4	February 14, 2020	S Electronics	Kyung Hee University	Lost (42 : 76)	
5	February 28, 2020	ATP	Kyung Hee University	Won (75 : 72)	
6	March 6, 2020	ZOO	West Suwon Chilbo Gymnasium	Lost (78 : 86)	
7	March 20, 2020	Anyang Owls	Kyung Hee University	Lost (66 : 76)	
8	March 27, 2020	UPTEMPO	Bucheon Gymnasium	Lost (73 : 85)	

== Ratings ==
In the ratings below, the lowest rating for the show will be in blue and the highest rating for the show will be in red.

Ep. #	Broadcast Date	Nielsen Korea Nationwide	
Ep. #	Broadcast Date	Part 1	Part 2
1	January 10, 2020	3.2%	3.4%
2	January 17, 2020	2.5%	3.0%
3	January 24, 2020	2.6%	2.2%
4	January 31, 2020	2.3%	2.6%
5	February 7, 2020	2.4%	2.6%
6	February 14, 2020	2.2%	2.5%
7	February 21, 2020	2.0%	2.5%
8	February 28, 2020	2.5%	2.7%
9	March 6, 2020	2.7%	3.6%
10	March 13, 2020	2.2%	2.4%
11	March 20, 2020	2.2%	3.3%
12	March 27, 2020	3.4%	3.0%

== Award and Nomination ==
Year	Award	Category	Recipients	Result	Ref.
2020	14th SBS Entertainment Awards	Special Award: SBS Honorary Employee Award	Seo Jang-hoon	Won	
