= Kim Yong-ji =

South Korean actress (born 1991)

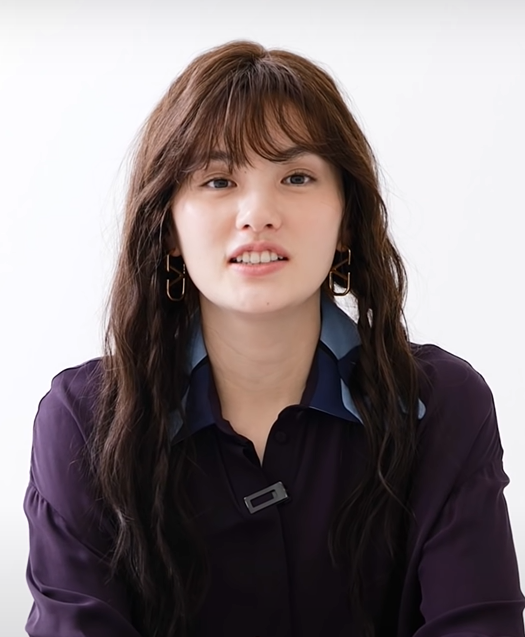
- Kim in January 2022
- Born: April 14, 1991 (age 35)
- Education: Seoul Institute of the Arts – Department of Theater
- Occupations: Actress; model
- Years active: 2015–present
- Agent: Hiin Entertainment
- Height: 165 cm (5 ft 5 in)
- Spouse: Unknown (m. 2026)

Korean name
- Hangul: 김용지
- RR: Gim Yongji
- MR: Kim Yongji

Kim Yong-ji (Korean: 김용지; born April 14, 1991) is a South Korean actress. Her first appearance was in the period drama Mr. Sunshine (2018) and she is best known for her role in Tale of the Nine Tailed (2020).

== Personal life ==
She was born in Ansan and later moved to Seoul. She has only one older sister, Young-hee. She graduated from high school with a degree in culinary arts and wanted to go to France with her sister after graduation, but at the invitation of her father, she ultimately chose acting as her career and accordingly studied theater at the Seoul Institute of the Arts and received her bachelor's degree.

Kim was married on 11 October 2026. Her husband's identity was not publicized.

== Filmography ==
=== Film ===
Year	Title	Role	Ref.
2022	Doom Doom	I-na	

=== Television series ===
Year	Title	Role	Ref.
2018	Mr. Sunshine	Hotaru	
2019	Watcher	Lee Hyo-jung	
2019	The Lies Within	Choi Soo-yun	
2020	The King: Eternal Monarch	Myung Seung-ah / Myung Na-ri	
2020	Tale of the Nine Tailed	Ki Yu-ri	
2023	Tale of the Nine Tailed 1938	Sunwoo Eun-ho / Ginko Tawara	
2026	The Art of Sarah	Shin So-ui	

=== Web series ===
Year	Title	Role	Ref.
2022	Somebody	Mook-eun	

== Awards and nominations ==
Name of the award ceremony, year presented, category, nominee of the award, and the result of the nomination
Award ceremony	Year	Category	Nominee / Work	Result	Ref.
Buil Film Awards	2023	Best New Actress	Doom Doom	Nominated	
