= Wook Talk =

South Korean talk show

- Promotional poster
- Also known as: Because I Want to Talk
- Hangul: 이동욱은 토크가 하고 싶어서
- Lit.: Lee Dong-wook Wants to Talk
- RR: I Dongugeun tokeuga hago sipeoseo
- MR: I Tongugŭn t'ok'ŭga hago sip'ŏsŏ
- Genre: Talk show
- Created by: Choi Tae-hwan
- Written by: Lim Dong-soon; Kwon Jin-oh
- Starring: Lee Dong-wook
- Country of origin: South Korea
- Original language: Korean
- No. of episodes: 12

Production
- Producers: So Hyung-seok; Hwang Sung-joon
- Running time: 60 minutes

Original release
- Network: SBS TV
- Release: December 4, 2019 – February 26, 2020

Wook Talk (Korean: 이동욱은 토크가 하고 싶어서) is a South Korean talk show hosted by Lee Dong-wook alongside comedian Jang Do-yeon and announcer Jo Jung-shik. It aired on Wednesdays at 22:00 (KST) time slot on SBS TV from December 4, 2019, to February 26, 2020. It was later replaced by K-Trot in Town on March 4, 2020.

== Cast ==
- Lee Dong-wook as host
- Jang Do-yeon as MC
- Jo Jung-shik as talk analyst

== Production ==
=== Background ===
On November 2, 2019, Lee Dong-wook announced at the end of his fanmeeting that he would be hosting his own talk show. The following day, his agency King Kong by Starship officially confirmed the news. The decision was made after his hosting skills were recognized in Strong Heart (2012–2013) and to celebrate his 20th anniversary since debut.

=== Live music ===
The show is not aired live but is instead filmed in front of a live audience. The live soundtrack for the show is provided by the band Seo Young-do Electric Ensemble.

=== Shortened title ===
Following recurring remarks by netizens on the show's title being too long (Korean: 이동욱은 토크가 하고 싶어서; lit. 'Lee Dong-wook Wants to Talk'), SBS launched a poll on its website on December 18, 2019, with six different options for a shortened version of the title. The poll ran for 10 days, until December 28, and netizens could vote once a day. "Wook Talk" won with 87% of the votes.

== Episodes ==
No.	Guests	Original release date	Ref.
1	Gong Yoo	December 4, 2019	
Lee Dong-wook invites his friend and Goblin co-star to talk about the actor's recent comeback. During a game, Gong Yoo makes different poses according to journal headlines about him. He also answers questions by choosing a humble version or a flex version. The episode includes clips of a trip the two men made to Jeju Island to celebrate Lee Dong-wook's birthday.
2	Gong Yoo	December 11, 2019	
In the second part of the pilot episode, Gong Yoo and Lee Dong-wook go fishing with fellow actor Park Byung-eun in Jeju Island. Gong Yoo later opens up about his two-year hiatus. Back at the studio, the two men go on a fake date with MC Jang Do-yeon. The actor also talks about raising social issues through films and how working on Silenced (2011) was a turning point in his career.
3	Lee Sedol	December 18, 2019	
The now retired professional Go player of 9 dan rank Lee Sedol, who is the only person to have won a game against the computer program AlphaGo, talks about the 2016 five-game match. He opens up about how the growing presence of AI influenced his retirement in November 2019 and talks about his final match against the program Handol. In a video clip, Lee Dong-wook goes to see how Handol trains for the game and plays a match against it.
4	Lee Soo-geun	December 25, 2019	
The episode was filmed in a small theater in Daehangno, a neighborhood in Seoul, similar to where Lee Soo-geun used to do gigs in open stages when he started his career as a comedian. He talks about his television debut in Gag Concert alongside Kim Byung-man, why he often incorporates music in his gigs, how Kang Ho-dong helped him during his difficult transition to variety shows and the hardships of his profession. He does a role-play with the host and the MC where the three are at an audition. In a video clip, Lee Dong-wook and Lee Soo-geun wander around the neighborhood where the comedian made his debut.
5	Park Jie-won	January 8, 2020	
Assemblyman Park Jie-won from the New Alternatives is asked to respect two rules while answering the host's questions: not saying "I don't remember" and not getting angry. In videos clips, Lee Dong-wook visits the National Assembly with announcer Jo Jung-shik and pundit Go Hyun-joon to meet with assemblymen and ministers. They ask about a recent British survey according to which politics is among the least reliable professions in South Korea. In a role-play session, the host and the guest each play apartment representative candidates.
6	Kim Seo-hyung	January 15, 2020	
The Sky Castle star talks about how she prepared for the iconic role, her love for music, her fashion style and the struggles she has been through to establish herself as an actress, including discrimination. In video clips, Kim Seo-hyung invites Lee Dong-wook and Jang Do-yeon to a resort in Gapyeong County where she stays while preparing for her next drama and cooks with them. She also goes to a ski resort with Lee Dong-wook.
7	Yoo Sung-ho	January 22, 2020	
Lee Dong-wook invites Yoo Sung-ho, a forensic scientist and professor at Seoul National University's medical school as well as a medical examiner for the National Forensic Service. He talks about the lack of people working in his field and mentions a few cases he worked on, including Lee Choon-jae's Hwaseong serial murders. He explains the DNA results of Lee Dong-wook and one of the show producer. In video clips, Jang Do-yeon attends one of the professor's classes and Lee Dong-wook visits him after he has carried an autopsy to interview his team.
8	Yeon Sang-ho	January 29, 2020	
The film director talks about how Seoul Station (2016) was able to exist thanks to the success of Train to Busan (2016), about his experience at the Cannes Film Festival where both films premiered and about the live-action's sequel Peninsula (2020). In video clips, Jang Do-yeon and Jo Jung-shik record zombie sounds for the film in a sound mixing room whereas Lee Dong-wook becomes a filmmaker to produce the episode's trailer.
9	Jeong Kwan	February 5, 2020	
The Seon Buddhist monk and chef of Korean cuisine talks about temple food and how she became a monk. She shares behind stories of the Netflix series Chef's Table in which she featured in 2017 and of her experience at the Berlin Film Festival. In video clips, Lee Dong-wook visits her in Chunjinam Hermitage at the Baegyangsa to cook vegetables with her, whereas Jang Do-yeon goes to a restaurant in Suwon that serves temple food and eats with three foreigners.
10	Choi Hyun-mi	February 12, 2020	
The episode was filmed without a live audience due to the COVID-19 pandemic. The female professional boxer talks about being the only South Korean two-weight world champion, she describes in depth her sport that is yet to be popular in her country and mentions the hardships she had to overcome after leaving North Korea. In a situational talk, hosts and guest do an unboxing video of the boxer's bag. In a video clip, Lee Dong-wook visits Choi Hyun-mi during her training and takes a boxing lesson from her.
11	BoA	February 19, 2020	
The episode was filmed without a live audience due to the coronavirus outbreak. In celebration of her 20th anniversary since debut, singer BoA looks back on her first years as a performer, including her first televised performance. In video clips, Lee Dong-wook and Jang Do-yeon host Wookigayo (a parody of the music program Inkigayo), with BoA as guest, and react to videos of the artist from the early 2000s. They also wear high school uniforms and talk about their school days at a restaurant before going to an arcade to play games and use a palm reader machine.
12	BoA, Jang Do-yeon & Lee Sedol	February 26, 2020	
As a follow-up to the previous episode, BoA and Lee Dong-wook eat at the singer's favourite restaurant (in SM Entertainment's former neighborhood) then go to a coin karaoke room. Back at the studio, she talks about the difficulties she has been through when debuting in Japan and her unexpected success. She also sings a duet of "City of Stars" with the host. In the last twenty minutes of the episode, which are filmed in a rented house, Jang Do-yeon and Lee Sedol are Lee Dong-wook's guests.

== Ratings ==
In the table below, the blue numbers represent the highest ratings and the red numbers represent the lowest ratings.

Ep.	Original broadcast date	AGB Nielsen	
Ep.	Original broadcast date	Part 1	Part 2
1	December 4, 2019	4.0%	4.8%
2	December 11, 2019	2.9%	3.5%
3	December 18, 2019	3.2%	3.9%
4	December 25, 2019	3.8%	3.5%
5	January 8, 2020	2.6%	3.0%
6	January 15, 2020	3.3%	3.9%
7	January 22, 2020	4.0%	4.2%
8	January 29, 2020	2.1%	2.2%
9	February 5, 2020	2.9%	3.9%
10	February 12, 2020	2.5%	2.7%
11	February 19, 2020	2.6%	3.3%
12	February 26, 2020	2.0%	2.3%
Average		3.2%	
