= Bad and Crazy =

2021 South Korean mystery television series

- Promotional poster
- Hangul: 배드 앤 크레이지
- RR: Baedeu aen keureiji
- MR: Paedŭ aen k'ŭreiji
- Genre: Mystery; Drama; Thriller; Comedy
- Created by: Kim Je-hyeon (tvN); Kim Young-kyu (Studio Dragon); Kang Hee-jun (iQIYI)
- Written by: Kim Sae-bom
- Directed by: Yoo Seon-dong
- Starring: Lee Dong-wook; Wi Ha-joon; Han Ji-eun; Cha Hak-yeon
- Music by: Kim Woo-geun
- Country of origin: South Korea
- Original language: Korean
- No. of episodes: 12

Production
- Executive producers: Kim Seon-tae; Lee Min-ha
- Producers: Kim Seong-min; Wang-seung
- Running time: 65-75 minutes
- Production companies: Studio Dragon; Mink Entertainment

Original release
- Network: tvN
- Release: December 17, 2021 – January 28, 2022

Bad and Crazy (Korean: 배드 앤 크레이지) is a South Korean television series. Directed by Yoo Seon-dong and co-produced by Studio Dragon and Mink Entertainment, it features Lee Dong-wook, Wi Ha-joon, Han Ji-eun, and Cha Hak-yeon in main roles. This iQIYI original series depicts the story of a competent but corrupt detective whose life is thrown into chaos by a mysterious, justice-seeking entity. It premiered on tvN & iQIYI on December 17, 2021, and aired every Friday and Saturday at 22:40 (KST) till January 28, 2022.

== Synopsis ==
The story is about a corrupt yet practical detective who has Dissociative Identity Disorder and who harbours a sense of justice. Su-yeol (Lee Dong-wook) works as a police officer. He is competent at his job, but he also has questionable ethics. He will do anything to achieve success. Due to his ambitious personality, he has received promotions in a short period of time. His smooth life suddenly changes with the appearance of K (Wi Ha-joon), who is a righteous person. Meanwhile, Lee Hui-gyeom (Han Ji-eun) works as a police lieutenant on the drug squad at the Mooui Police Department.

== Cast ==
=== Main ===
- Lee Dong-wook as Ryu Soo-yeol / In Jae-hui
  - Nam Do-yoon as young In Jae-hui

A corrupt police detective who changes into a champion for justice. He is competent at his job, but he also has questionable ethics. He will do anything to achieve success. Due to his ambitious personality, he has received promotions in a short period of time. His smooth life suddenly changes with the appearance of K.

- Wi Ha-joon as K

A man with a crazy sense of justice. He is a righteous person, but also crazy. Whenever he faces injustice, he meets it with a fist.

- Han Ji-eun as Lee Hui-gyeom

A detective of the drug crime investigation team. Hee Kyum works as a police lieutenant on the drug squad at the Mooui Police Department. She is also a righteous person and enthusiastic at her job. She is the ex-girlfriend of Soo-Yeol. She is a detective with a passion index, who applied to the drug investigation world to enjoy the joy of hitting the bad guys. She comes from a wealthy background and had a good education, but is considered the "black sheep" of the family. She also constantly butts heads with Soo Yeol.

- Cha Hak-yeon as Oh Kyeong-tae

The youngest member of the anti-corruption investigation department of the National Police Agency. He is an infinitely friendly and warm-hearted person who can not pass by people in trouble and approach them first and offer a helping hand. He has a clean and pure side without any wrinkle, but he will appear as an ardent police officer, who does not let go of the string of doubt with his tenacity and who does not miss a single clue in his work, increasing the tension of the play and revealing a strong presence.

=== Supporting ===
==== Munyang Police Agency ====
Anti-Corruption Investigation Division

- Sung Ji-ru as Bong-pil, chief of the anti-corruption investigation department of the Munyang Police Agency.
- Cha Si-won as Jae-seon, 2nd Team Inspector of Anti-Corruption Investigation Division.

Drug Crime Investigation Division

- Lee Hwa-ryong as Gye-sik, Narcotics Crime Investigation Team, Drug Crime Investigation Team 1, Team Leader.
- Shin Joo-hwan as Heo Jong-goo, Narcotics Crime Investigation Team, Drug Crime Investigation Team 1.
- Cho Dong-in as Chan-ki Jeong, Narcotics Crime Investigation Team, Drug Crime Investigation Team 1.
- Lee Sang-hong as Do In-beom, homicide detective.

==== Drug organization ====
- Kim Hieo-ra as Boss Yong, drug gang leader.
- Won Hyun-jun as Andrei, Boss Yong's assistant.

=== Others ===
- Lee Joo-hyeon as Tak Min-su
- Kang Ae-shim as Seo Seung-suk, Soo-yeol's adoptive mother.
- Kim Dae-gon as Ryu Dong-yeol, Soo-yeol's adoptive older brother.
  - Park Seon-hu as young Ryu Dong-yeol

As a middle school student, he looked and found Jae-hui sleeping in the front of his house in the morning.

- Lim Ki-hong as Assemblyman Do Yu-gon
- Nam Woo-joo as Jeong Hyeon-soo, an equipment manufacturing technician.
- Park Se-joon as Nam Eun-seok, Prosecutor trainee at the Munyang District Prosecutor's Office.
- Jung Sung-il as Shin Ju-hyeok / Jeong Yun-ho, a therapist of a youth center, and manipulator of Soo-yeol since his youth.
  - Jung Yoon-seok as young Jeong Yun-ho
- Park Ji-hong as Su Jan, the head of a criminal organization led by Chief Masa, although he is a foreign worker. He speaks Korean at a high level freely.
- Park Min-sang as Shim Jeong-hun

=== Special appearances ===
- Park Seo-yeon as Baek Young-joo (ep. 8)
- Yang Dae-hyuk as Park Seong-gwan
- Kim Seon-hwa as Doctor Hong

== Production ==
On March 31, 2021, it was announced that Yoo Seon-dong, the director of OCN 2020 TV series The Uncanny Counter, would be directing OCN's Bad and Crazy. One day later, it was reported by Lee Dong-wook's agency, King Kong by Starship that he is considering the offer of appearing in the series positively. The series is the third drama collaboration between iQIYI and Studio Dragon, after My Roommate Is a Gumiho and Shooting Stars, with Mink Entertainment (Drama Stage: Anthology) joining as a co-producer. It was planned to air on OCN but later on, the broadcast channel was changed to tvN. On May 19, 2021, it was reported that Han Ji-eun received an invitation to appear in the series. On June 14, Cha Hak-yeon's agency, Fifty OneK reported that he was considering the proposal to appear in the series. On September 1, Lee Dong-wook and Han Ji-eun were confirmed to cast as main lead in the TV series.

Script reading site was revealed by releasing stills on October 27, 2021.

=== Filming ===
On August 8, filming of the series took place at Ochang-eup, Cheongwon District, North Chungcheong Province.

== Release ==
The series was released on December 17, 2021, and aired every Friday and Saturday at 22:40 (KST). It is also available on iQIYI in 191 countries for streaming.

== Original soundtrack ==
Bad and Crazy

Soundtrack album by Various
- Released: 2021
- Genre: Soundtrack
- Languages: Korean; English
- Labels: Genie Music; Stone Music Entertainment

=== Part 1 ===
Released on December 25, 2021
No.	Title	Lyrics	Music	Artist	Length
1.	"Bulldozer" (불도저)	Don Mills, Taeyoung Kim, Bayside Pablo	Kim Tae-young, Bayside Pablo, Byun Ji-hwan	Don Mills	2:55
2.	"Bulldozer" (instrumental)		Kim Tae-young, Bayside Pablo, Byun Ji-hwan		2:55

=== Part 2 ===
Released on December 31, 2021
No.	Title	Lyrics	Music	Artist	Length
1.	"BUMP!"	IKEK(FAB), G2	IKEK(FAB), Scholarship, G2	G2 (G2), Scholarship	2:54
2.	"BUMP!" (instrumental)				2:54

=== Part 3 ===
Released on January 8, 2022
No.	Title	Lyrics	Music	Artist	Length
1.	"Out of My Way"	Jayins, Naiv	Jayins, Naiv	Vincent (Crackshot)	2:41
2.	"Out of My Way" (instrumental)				2:41

=== Part 4 ===
Released on January 15, 2022
No.	Title	Lyrics	Music	Artist	Length
1.	"Present"	Lee Seongju	Lee Seongju	Song Yerin	3:36
2.	"Present" (instrumental)		Lee Seongju		3:36

== Viewership ==
Bad and Crazy : South Korea viewers per episode (thousands)

Season	Episode number												Average
Season	1	2	3	4	5	6	7	8	9	10	11	12	Average
1	1086	947	1059	875	852	740	934	854	N/A	724	633	757	N/A

Source: Audience measurement performed nationwide by Nielsen Korea

Average TV viewership ratings
Ep.	Original broadcast date	Average audience share (Nielsen Korea)	
Ep.	Original broadcast date	Nationwide	Seoul
1	December 17, 2021	4.473% (1st)	4.769% (1st)
2	December 18, 2021	3.686% (2nd)	4.202% (2nd)
3	December 24, 2021	3.747% (1st)	4.325% (1st)
4	December 25, 2021	3.134% (2nd)	3.579% (2nd)
5	December 31, 2021	3.398% (1st)	3.683% (1st)
6	January 1, 2022	2.617% (3rd)	3.032% (3rd)
7	January 7, 2022	3.477% (1st)	3.619% (1st)
8	January 8, 2022	3.098% (2nd)	3.521% (2nd)
9	January 14, 2022	3.389% (1st)	N/A
10	January 21, 2022 (Note: Due to the live broadcast of the Korea national soccer team friendly match on 15 January, the episode 10 will be aired on January 21, 2022.)	2.811% (2nd)	3.106% (1st)
11	January 22, 2022	2.390% (3rd)	2.825% (2nd)
12	January 28, 2022	2.841% (1st)	2.830% (1st)
Average		3.255%	— (Note: Due to some ratings not recorded, the exact average rating is unknown.)
In the table above, the blue numbers represent the lowest ratings and the red numbers represent the highest ratings.; N/A denotes that the rating is not known.; This drama airs on a cable channel/pay TV which normally has a relatively smaller audience compared to free-to-air TV/public broadcasters (KBS, SBS, MBC and EBS).
