= Ryu Kyung-soo =

South Korean actor (born 1992)

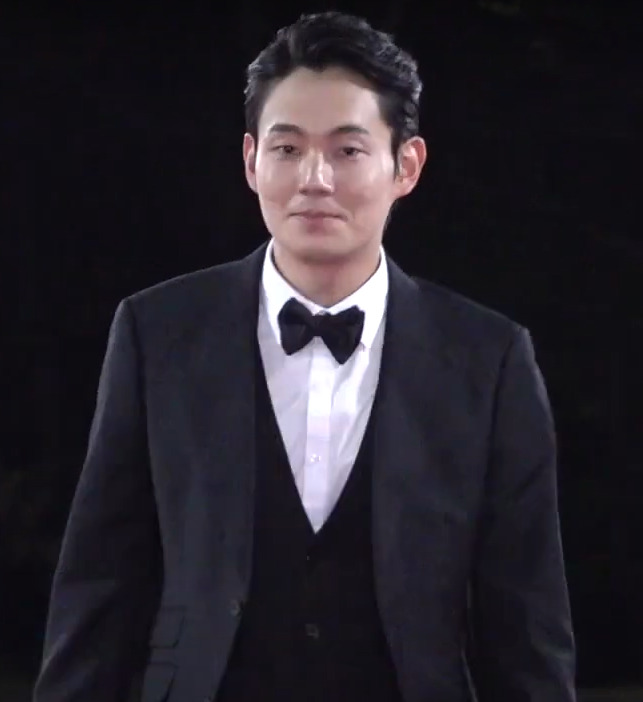
- Ryu at the 42nd Blue Dragon Film Awards
- Born: 12 October 1992 (age 34); Cheongsong-gun, Gyeongsangbuk-do, South Korea
- Education: Chung-Ang University – Department of Theater
- Occupation: Actor
- Years active: 2010–present
- Agent: Ghost Studio

Korean name
- Hangul: 류경수
- RR: Ryu Gyeongsu
- MR: Ryu Kyŏngsu

Ryu Kyung-soo (born 12 October 1992) is a South Korean actor. He is known for his roles in the drama series Itaewon Class (2020), Tale of the Nine Tailed 1938 (2023), and Our Unwritten Seoul (2025). He also appeared in the films A Resistance (2019), Hostage: Missing Celebrity (2021), and Yadang: The Snitch (2025).

== Career ==
In March 2019, Ryu joined the recurring cast of the series Confession in the role of Han Jong-goo, a suspect in the Eun Seo-gu murder case.

In 2020, Ryu was cast in the series Itaewon Class where he played the role ex-gangster Choi Seung-kwon, one of "Dan Bam's" employees and Park Sae-ro-yi's (Park Seo-joon) friend and former cell-mate. The same year, he appeared in KakaoTV's Lovestruck in the City.

In 2021, he appeared in the Netflix original series Hellbound as a cult priest. He starred in another Netflix original series Glitch in 2022, as well as in the Netflix original film Jung_E in 2023.

In 2023, he starred alongside Lee Dong-wook in the action-fantasy drama Tale of the Nine Tailed 1938 as Cheon Mu-Yeong, a former mountain god that was once Lee Yeon's long time friend.

In 2025, Ryu starred opposite Park Bo-young and Park Jin-young in the tvN drama Our Unwritten Seoul as Han Se-jin, the owner of Changhwa Farm and business partner of Yoo Mi-rae.

== Filmography ==
=== Film ===
Year	Title	Role	Notes	Ref.
2011	Changu-dong Cave Bridge	Young man		
2012	Pluto	Park Jeong-jae		
2014	Midnight Sun	Dongjun		
2016	Baby Beside Me	Baek-hyeon		
2017	Midnight Runners	Police academy conscripted policeman		
2018	The Vanished	Repair team 2		
2018	A Daytime Picnic	Goo jae-min		
2019	Possible Faces			
2019	A Resistance	Nishida / Jung Chun-young		
2019	The Divine Fury	Doctor		
	The Call	Policeman		
2021	Hostage: Missing Celebrity	Yeom Dong-hun		
2022	Broker	Shin Tae-ho	Special appearance	
2022	Daemuga: Sorrow and Joy	Shin-Nam		
2023	Jung_E	Sang-hoon		
2024	Cabriolet	Byeong-jae		
2025	Yadang: The Snitch	Cho Hoon		
2025	Noise	Geun-Bae		
2025	Homeward Bound	Jin Woo		

=== Television series ===
Acting credits of Ryu in television series
Year	Title	Role	Notes	Ref.
2012	Happy Ending	Park Jeong-ho		
2013	Two Weeks			
2019	Confession	Han Jong-goo		
2020	Itaewon Class	Choi Seung-kwon		
2020–2021	Lovestruck in the City	Kang Geon		
2021	Hellbound	Cult priest	Season 1	
2022	The Sound of Magic	Part-time employee	Cameo	
2022	Glitch	Kim Byung-jo		
2023	Tale of the Nine Tailed 1938	Cheon Mu-Yeong		
2024	The Bequeathed	Kim Young-ho		
2025	Our Unwritten Seoul	Han Se-Jin		
2026	Bloodhounds	Detective Choi	Season 2; Special appearance	
2027	My Ghostly Running Mate †	No Ho-yeol	Special appearance	

=== Web shows ===
Year	Title	Role	Ref.
2022	Young Actors' Retreat	Cast member	

=== Hosting ===
Year	Title	Notes	Ref.
2021	Opening ceremony Indie Forum Film Festival 2021	with Gong Min-jeung	

== Awards and nominations ==
Name of the award ceremony, year presented, category, nominee of the award, and the result of the nomination
Award ceremony	Year	Category	Nominee / Work	Result	Ref.
Asia Artist Awards	2021	Icon Award	Ryu Kyung-soo	Won	
Asia Artist Awards	2022	Scene Stealer Award	Ryu Kyung-soo	Won	
Baeksang Arts Awards	2024	Best Supporting Actor – Television	The Bequeathed	Nominated	
Blue Dragon Film Awards	2021	Best New Actor	Hostage: Missing Celebrity	Nominated	
