= Hwang Hee =

South Korean actor

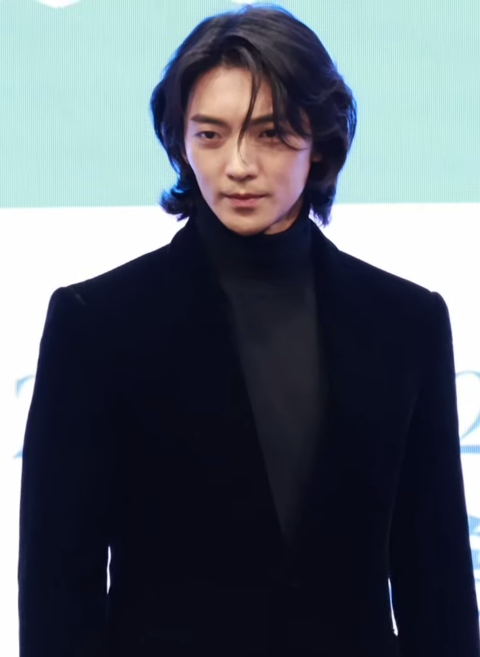
- Hwang in December 2023
- Born: Kim Ji-soo; October 18, 1988 (age 37); South Korea
- Education: Kyung Hee University
- Occupation: Actor
- Years active: 2010–present
- Agent: Surpass Entertainment

Korean name
- Hangul: 김지수
- RR: Gim Jisu
- MR: Kim Chisu

Stage name
- Hangul: 황희
- RR: Hwang Hui
- MR: Hwang Hŭi

Hwang Hee (born Kim Ji-soo; October 18, 1988) is a South Korean actor. He is known for his roles in the television series Tomorrow, with You (2017), Arthdal Chronicles (2019), and Doctor John (2019).

== Filmography ==
=== Film ===
Year	Title	Role
2019	Race to Freedom: Um Bok Dong	Military police officer

=== Television series ===
Year	Title	Role	Notes	Ref.
2017	Tomorrow, with You	Chun Min-joon		
2019	Arthdal Chronicles	Moo-gwang		
2019	Doctor John	Lee Yoo-joon		
2020	Tale of the Nine Tailed	Koo Shin-joo		
2020	Drama Special	Jung Eun-hyuk	Episode: "The Reason Why I Can't Tell You"	
2021	Lovestruck in the City	Cha Chi-hoon	Episode: "Winter, Midnight, Seoul"	
2021	Dali & Cocky Prince	Joo Won-tak		
2021	The Veil	Oh Kyung-seok		
2022	Today's Webtoon	Ahn Gyu-jin	Cameo (episode 1)	
2023	Tale of the Nine Tailed 1938	Koo Shin-joo		
2024	Love Song for Illusion	Sajo Yung		
2026	The Judge Returns	Park Chul-woo		
2026	The Apartment Job	Jang Je-gil		

=== Variety show ===
Year	Title	Role	Ref.
2020	Run	Cast member	

== Theater ==
Year	Title	Role
2010	Sailing for Life	
2013	Magicians	
2012–2015	The Art of Seduction	
2015	Love Is	

== Awards and nominations ==
Year	Award	Category	Nominated work	Result
2019	27th SBS Drama Awards	Best New Actor	Doctor John	Nominated
