= Tale of the Nine Tailed 1938 =

2023 South Korean television series

- Promotional poster
- Hangul: 구미호뎐 1938
- Hanja: 九尾狐傳 1938
- RR: Gumihodyeon 1938
- MR: Kumihodyŏn 1938
- Genre: Action; Fantasy
- Created by: Studio Dragon
- Written by: Han Woo-ri
- Directed by: Kang Shin-hyo; Jo Nam-hyung
- Starring: Lee Dong-wook; Kim So-yeon; Kim Bum; Ryu Kyung-soo
- Composers: Hong Dae-sung; So Sue-jeong; Park Seo-hee; Hwang Mi-rae
- Country of origin: South Korea
- Original language: Korean
- No. of episodes: 12

Production
- Executive producer: Lee Hye-young
- Producers: Na Ji-hyun; Ham Geun-ho
- Production companies: Studio Dragon; How Pictures

Original release
- Network: tvN
- Release: May 6 – June 11, 2023

Related
- Tale of the Nine Tailed

Tale of the Nine Tailed 1938 (Korean: 구미호뎐 1938) is a 2023 South Korean television series starring Lee Dong-wook, Kim So-yeon, Kim Bum, and Ryu Kyung-soo. The series serves as the second season to the 2020 series Tale of the Nine Tailed and a prequel to the former season's storyline. It aired from May 6 to June 11, 2023 on tvN's Saturdays and Sundays at 21:20 (KST). It is also available for streaming on TVING in South Korea and Amazon Prime Video in selected regions.

== Synopsis ==
Tale of the Nine Tailed 1938 tells the story of Lee Yeon (Lee Dong-wook) being unexpectedly dragged back in time to the year 1938, during the Japanese occupation of Korea, due to certain events that happened after Tale of the Nine Tailed; there, he meets Lee Rang (Kim Bum) and Ryu Hong-joo (Kim So-yeon) of that era.

== Cast ==
=== Main ===
- Lee Dong-wook as Lee Yeon

The titular gumiho (nine-tailed fox), who is a former mountain spirit and guardian of Baekdudaegan. He had a happy ending with his eternal first love Nam Ji-ah, but is recalled to 1938 after getting caught up in an unexpected incident.

- Kim So-yeon as Ryu Hong-joo

Former western mountain god (implied to be Jirisan) who is currently the owner of Myoyeongak, a top-notch restaurant in Gyeongseong. She gets entangled with Lee Yeon, to whom she confessed to a long time ago but was rejected. Through dialogue, it is implied that she was Goo Shin-joo's former master.

- Kim Bum as Lee Rang

A half-blood gumiho and Lee Yeon's younger brother, who has feelings of both love and hatred for his older brother.

- Ryu Kyung-soo as Cheon Moo-young

Former northern mountain god who saves even the dead. He is a longtime friend of Lee Yeon and Hong-joo. He stole the Samdocheon Guardian Stone and fled to the past.

=== Supporting ===
==== People around Lee Yeon ====
- Hwang Hee as Koo Shin-joo

A native fox who goes on a tough monster hunt with Lee Yeon.

- Kim Yong-ji as Sunwoo Eun-ho

A reporter under Sunwoo Ilbo.

- Kim Soo-jin as Snail Bride / Bok Hye-ja

Owner of the Obok Goods Store located in the middle of Gyeongseong.

==== People around Ryu Hong-joo ====
- Han Gun-yoo as Yoo Jae-yoo

A Jindo dog who is Hong-joo's bodyguard.

- Kim Joo-young as Mae Hwa

One of the kisaeng entertainers of Myoyeongak. She was collected by Hong-joo while begging on the street when she was young.

- Kim Na-hyun as Nancho

One of the kisaeng entertainers of Myoyeongak.

- Kang Na-eon as Guk Hee

One of the kisaeng entertainers of Myoyeongak.

- Joo Ye-rim as Juk Hyang

A young kisaeng entertainer of Myoyeongak who was abandoned by her father.

==== People around Lee Rang ====
- Woo Hyun-jin as Jang Yeo-hee

A half-blood mermaid who works two jobs as a clothing-store employee during the day and an unknown singer at Club Paradise at night.

- Jo Dal-hwan as Boo Doo-mok

Lee Rang's right-hand man, who is a bandit leader in 1938.

==== Afterlife Immigration Office ====
- Kim Jung-nan as Taluipa

Younger sister of King Yeomra (supreme ruler of the underworld), and wife of Hyunuiong. She works at the Afterlife Immigration Office managing the list of dead souls, and gives missions to Lee Yeon.

- Ahn Gil-kang as Hyunuiong

The gatekeeper of Samdo River, the husband of Taluipa, and father of Bok Gil. He also works at the Afterlife Immigration Office, and briefs dead souls before they enter the underworld.

==== Japanese Government-General of Korea ====
- Ha Do-kwon as Ryuhei Kato

Governor-General's Bureau of Police. He is one of the most powerful people in the Government-General of Korea.

- Lim Ji-ho as Akira Saito

The chief of Government-General's Police Department Security Section Officer.

=== Others ===
- Kim Seung-hwa as Yuki
- Jung Su-gyo as Jung Dae-seung

A Korean detective at the Jongno Police Station.

- Jang Ha-kyung as Yang Young-ae

Miss Joseon who came up from Busan to become the most beautiful woman in Joseon.

- Seo Young-joo as Satori

The final villain threatening Lee Yeon and Lee Rang.

- Go Geon-han as Jang San-beom

Jangsan tiger and assistant director.

=== Special appearances ===
- Younghoon as Dongbangsak
- Jo Bo-ah as Nam Ji-ah

== Original soundtrack ==
Part 1

Released on May 7, 2023
No.	Title	Lyrics	Music	Artist	Length
1.	"Full Moon"	Sean Kimm	Treasure Maker; Perrie; 9june9; Sean Kimm	Kihyun (Monsta X)	3:17
2.	"Full Moon" (Inst.)		Treasure Maker; Perrie; 9june9; Sean Kimm		3:17
Total length:					6:34

Part 2

Released on May 14, 2023
No.	Title	Lyrics	Music	Artist	Length
1.	"Love Song" (연가 (戀歌))	Kim Min	Hong Dae-sung	Kei	3:09
2.	"Love Song" (연가 (戀歌); Inst.)		Hong Dae-sung		3:09
Total length:					6:18

Part 3

Released on May 21, 2023
No.	Title	Lyrics	Music	Artist	Length
1.	"Kiss The Rain"	Kevin; Kim Min	Kevin; Kim Min	Thama	2:33
2.	"Kiss The Rain" (Inst.)		Kevin; Kim Min		2:33
Total length:					5:06

Part 4

Released on May 28, 2023
No.	Title	Lyrics	Music	Artist	Length
1.	"Wind Song" (바람의 노래)	Kim Min	Hong Dae-sung	Kei	4:11
2.	"Wind Song" (바람의 노래; Inst.)		Hong Dae-sung		4:11
Total length:					8:22

== Viewership ==
Tale of the Nine Tailed 1938 : South Korea viewers per episode (millions)

Season	Episode number												Average
Season	1	2	3	4	5	6	7	8	9	10	11	12	Average
1	1.659	1.843	1.443	1.805	1.457	1.664	1.514	1.803	1.283	1.685	1.287	2.216	1.638

Source: Audience measurement performed nationwide by Nielsen Korea.

Average TV viewership ratings
Ep.	Original broadcast date	Average audience share (Nielsen Korea)	
Ep.	Original broadcast date	Nationwide	Seoul
1	May 6, 2023	6.463% (1st)	7.409% (1st)
2	May 7, 2023	7.129% (1st)	8.303% (1st)
3	May 13, 2023	5.233% (1st)	5.808% (1st)
4	May 14, 2023	6.682% (1st)	7.606% (1st)
5	May 20, 2023	5.533% (1st)	6.656% (1st)
6	May 21, 2023	6.860% (1st)	8.116% (1st)
7	May 27, 2023	5.324% (1st)	6.249% (1st)
8	May 28, 2023	6.736% (1st)	7.983% (1st)
9	June 3, 2023	4.988% (1st)	6.155% (1st)
10	June 4, 2023	6.625% (1st)	8.196% (1st)
11	June 10, 2023	4.728% (1st)	5.475% (1st)
12	June 11, 2023	8.024% (1st)	9.102% (1st)
Average		6.194%	7.255%
In the table above, the blue numbers represent the lowest ratings and the red numbers represent the highest ratings.; This series aired on a cable channel/pay TV which normally has a relatively smaller audience compared to free-to-air TV/public broadcasters (KBS, SBS, MBC and EBS).
