= Lee Dong-wook =

South Korean actor and presenter (born 1981)

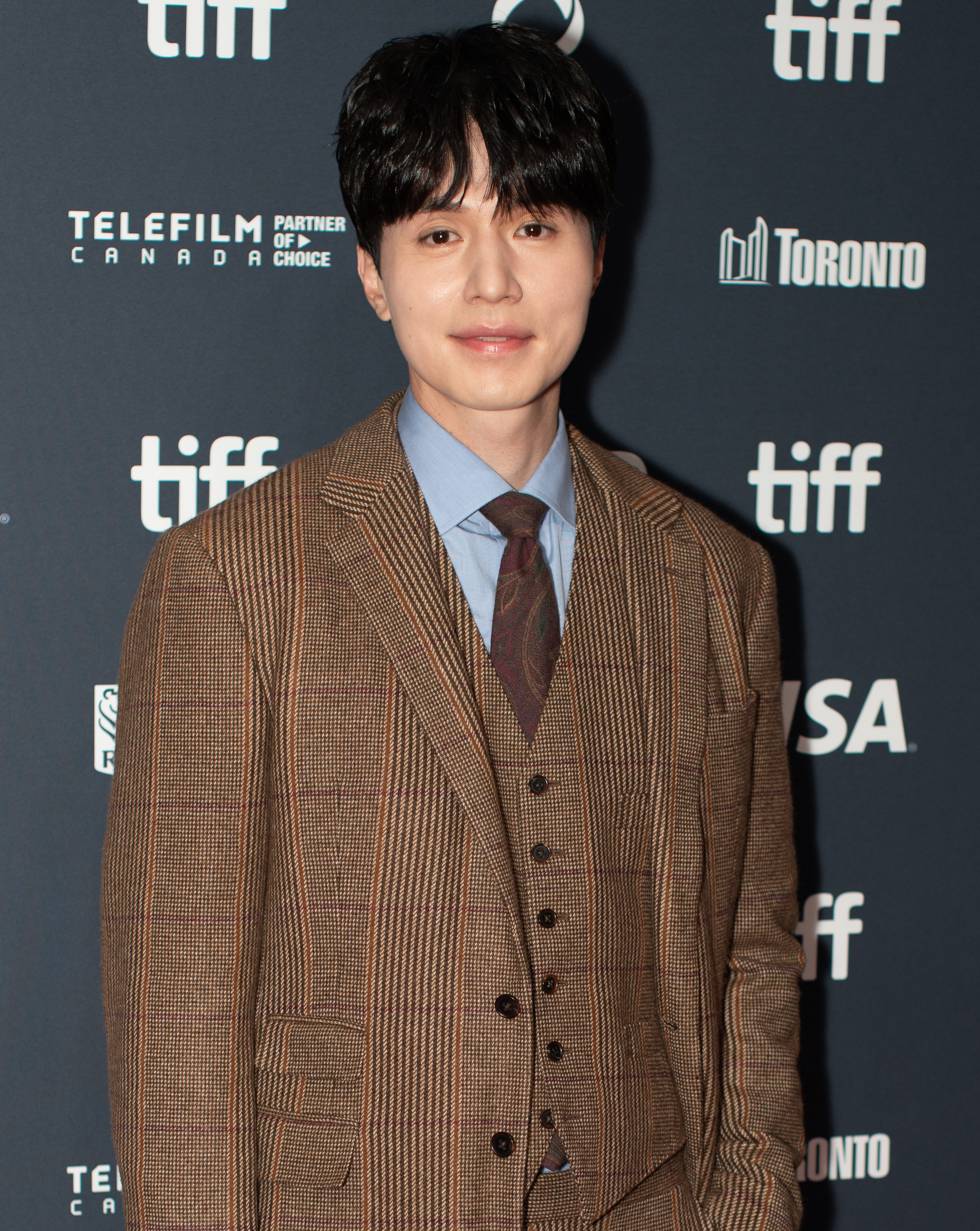
- Lee at the 2024 Toronto International Film Festival
- Born: 6 November 1981 (age 44); Seoul, South Korea
- Education: Joongbu University
- Occupations: Actor; presenter
- Years active: 1999–present
- Agent: King Kong by Starship
- Height: 1.83 m (6 ft 0 in)

Korean name
- Hangul: 이동욱
- Hanja: 李棟旭
- RR: I Donguk
- MR: I Tonguk
- Website: leedongwook.co.kr

Signature
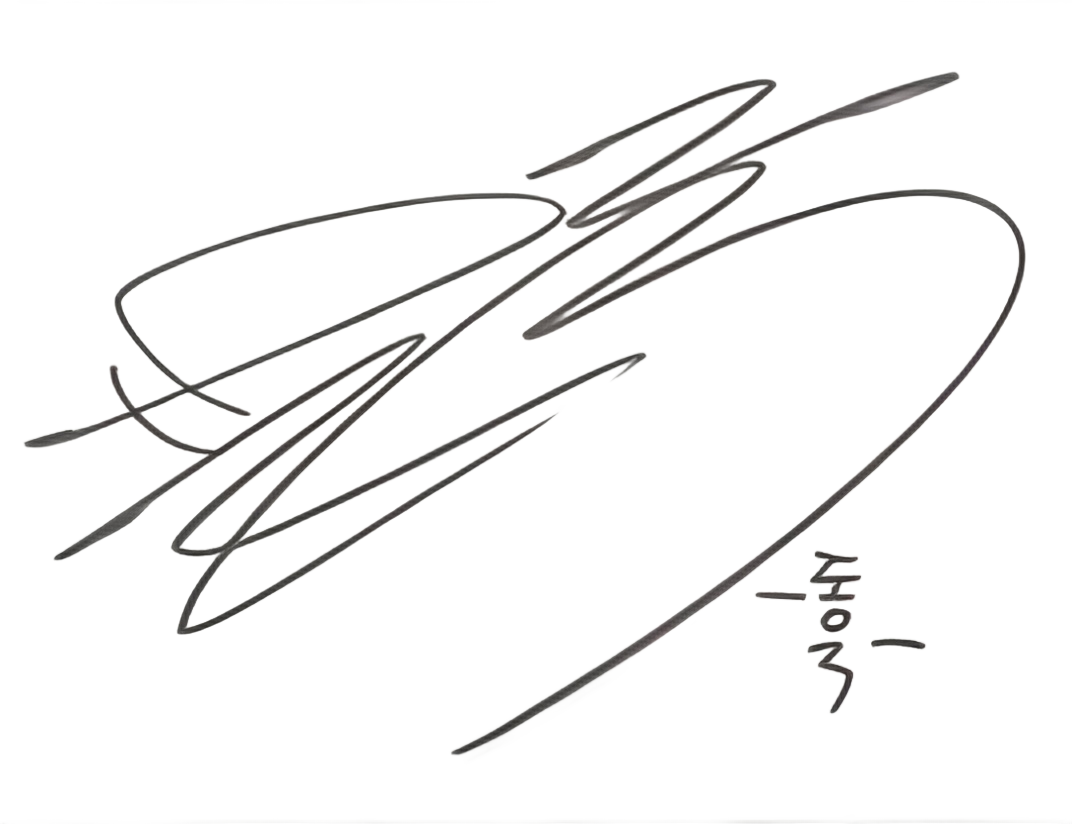

Lee Dong-wook (Korean: 이동욱; born 6 November 1981) is a South Korean actor and presenter. He is best known for his leading roles in the television dramas My Girl (2005–2006), Scent of a Woman (2011), Guardian: The Lonely and Great God (2016–2017), Life (2018), Hell Is Other People (2019), Tale of the Nine Tailed (2020), Bad and Crazy (2021), Tale of the Nine Tailed 1938 (2023), and A Shop for Killers (2024). He is also the host of the talk show Strong Heart (2012–2013), boy group survival reality show Produce X 101 (2019), and his own American-style talk show Wook Talk (2019).

== Early life and education ==
In 2005, Lee enrolled in Joongbu University, majoring in media and broadcasting arts.

== Career ==
Lee made his acting debut in 1999 in an MBC single-episode drama after winning the grand prize in the V-NESS model contest of the same year. The PD of the drama saw Lee, and proceeded to cast him in the teen drama School 2. Lee started to gain recognition with his performance in School 3.

Lee hit stardom with 2005 romantic comedy My Girl. The drama series became a hit during its run both domestically and across Asia, and made Lee a Korean Wave star.

He has since starred in noir Bitter Sweet Life (2008), courtroom dramedy Partner (2009), melodrama Scent of a Woman (2011), baseball rom-com Wild Romance (2012), period thriller The Fugitive of Joseon (2013), and revenge drama Hotel King (2014), in which he reunited with My Girl co-star Lee Da-hae. He then starred in fantasy-action series Blade Man (2014) and romance drama Bubble Gum (2015).

Lee and comedian Shin Dong-yup took over as MCs of talk show Strong Heart from April 2012 to January 2013. Lee also joined the reality show Roommate, which aired from 2014 to 2015.

From 2016 to 2017, Lee starred alongside Gong Yoo in Kim Eun-sook's fantasy-romance drama Guardian: The Lonely and Great God playing a grim reaper. The drama was a hit, and along with its success, helped in the resurgence of Lee's acting career.

In 2018, Lee starred in the medical drama Life as a doctor who works at the ER Department.

In 2019, Lee starred in the romance comedy drama Touch Your Heart alongside Guardian co-star Yoo In-na, playing a workaholic lawyer. The same year, he was confirmed as the host for Produce X 101, the fourth season of survival audition program Produce 101. He then starred as the main antagonist in the thriller drama Hell Is Other People as a dentist in the morning but a psychopath in the evening. He also started hosting his own talk show, Wook Talk, to celebrate his 20th anniversary since debut.

In 2020, Lee was cast in the fantasy drama Tale of the Nine Tailed as a nine-tailed fox who used to be a mountain god, and is now working as a civil servant. He also confirmed to appear in the romantic comedy film Single in Seoul alongside Im Soo-jung.

In December 2020, he was listed as Asia-Pacific's Most Influential Celebrities on Social Media.

In 2021, he appeared in A Year-End Medley, a romantic comedy film by Kwak Jae-yong and in an iQIYI original mystery drama Bad and Crazy, which aired on 17 December 2021.

In 2022, Lee joined the Universe communication platform.

In 2024, Lee starred in Disney+'s A Shop for Killers.

== Other activities ==
=== Ambassadorships ===
Year	Title	Ref.
2018	Honorary Ambassador for the PyeongChang 2018 Olympic and Paralympic Winter Games	
2018	Tourism Ambassador of Gangwon Province	
2024	Olympic Friends of 2024 Winter Youth Olympics	

=== Philanthropy ===
On 11 March 2022, Lee made a donation of ₩50 million to the Hope Bridge Disaster Relief Association to help the victims of the Uljin forest fire 2022, which devastated the area and then spread to Samcheok, South Korea.

On 5 Jan 2025, Lee made a donation of ₩50 million to the Community Chest of Jeollanam-do to support the families of the Dec 2024 Jeju Air plane accident victims.

On 27 Mar 2025, Lee made a donation of ₩50 million to the Hope Bridge Disaster Relieft Association to help the victims of the wildfires in the Ulsan, Gyeongbuk and Gyeongnam regions.

== Personal life ==
=== Military service ===
Lee enlisted in the military in August 2009, serving under the National Defense Public Relations Service. He was discharged in June 2011.

=== Ancestry ===
His parents are mainly of Korean descent. In a Wook Talk episode that aired on 22 January 2020, guest and forensic professor Yoo Sung-ho revealed genealogical DNA test results for him and one of the show's producers. According to Lee's results, a significant part of his mother's genetic makeup matches that of Koryak and Khaka people—both ethnic groups that are indigenous to Siberia (to be more specific, Kamchatka and Khakassia respectively).

== Bibliography ==
Year	Title	Category	Notes	Ref.
2017	For My Dear	Photo-book	ISBN 9791162201565	

== Accolades ==
=== Awards and nominations ===
Name of the award ceremony, year presented, category, nominee of the award, and the result of the nomination
Award ceremony	Year	Category	Nominee / Work	Result	Ref.
APAN Star Awards	2014	Top Excellence Award, Actor in a Serial Drama	Hotel King	Nominated	
APAN Star Awards	2018	K-Star Award	Life	Nominated	
APAN Star Awards	2018	Top Excellence Award, Actor in a Miniseries	Life	Nominated	
Asia Model Awards	2014	Fashionista Award	Lee Dong-wook	Won	
Brand of the Year Awards	2023	Male Actor of the Year (Drama)	Lee Dong-wook	Won	
Cosmopolitan Beauty Awards in China	2011	Most Attractive Actor in Asia	Lee Dong-wook	Won	
DramaFever Awards	2017	Best Supporting Actor	Guardian: The Lonely and Great God	Won	
Fashionista Awards	2017	Global Icon	Lee Dong-wook	Nominated	
I-Magazine Fashion Face Award	2021	Asian Male	Lee Dong-wook	Won	
iQIYI Awards	2021	The Most Popular Actor	Tale of the Nine Tailed	Won	
KBS Drama Awards	2009	Excellence Award, Actor in a Miniseries	Partner	Nominated	
KBS Drama Awards	2012	Excellence Award, Actor in a Miniseries	Wild Romance	Nominated	
KBS Drama Awards	2013	Excellence Award, Actor in a Mid-length Drama	The Fugitive of Joseon	Nominated	
Korea Drama Awards	2017	Top Excellence Award, Actor	Guardian: The Lonely and Great God	Nominated	
Korea Fashion Photographers Association	2018	Photogenic Award of the year	Lee Dong-wook	Won	
Korea First Brand Awards	2021	Best Actor	Lee Dong-wook	Won	
Korea Movie Star Awards	2007	Best New Actor	The Perfect Couple	Nominated	
Korean Most Popular Entertainment Awards	2001	New Generation Actor	Lee Dong-wook	Won	
Korean Most Popular Entertainment Awards	2002	Best New Actor (TV)	Loving You	Won	
MBC Drama Awards	2014	Top Excellence Award, Actor in a Special Project Drama	Hotel King	Nominated	
OCN Awards	2019	"Dangerously Attractive Character" Award	Hell Is Other People	Won	
PC LADY & Tudou Fashion Awards	2013	Asia Fashion Star Award	Lee Dong-wook	Won	
SBS Drama Awards	2003	New Star Award	Land of Wine	Won	
SBS Drama Awards	2003	Best Supporting Actor	Land of Wine	Nominated	
SBS Drama Awards	2011	Top 10 Stars	Scent of a Woman	Won	
SBS Drama Awards	2011	Top Excellence Award, Actor in a Weekend Drama	Scent of a Woman	Won	
SBS Entertainment Awards	2012	Best Couple Award	Lee Dong-wook (with Shin Dong-yup); Strong Heart	Won	
SBS Entertainment Awards	2012	Best Newcomer, MC category	Strong Heart	Won	
Soompi Awards	2018	Best Supporting Actor	Guardian: The Lonely and Great God	Won	
V-NESS Model Awards	1999	Grand Prize	Lee Dong-wook	Won	

=== State and cultural honors ===
Name of country or organization, year given and name of honor
Country or organization	Year	Honor	Ref.
South Korea-Japan Culture Awards	2011	Grand Prize for Cultural Diplomacy	

=== Listicles ===
Name of publisher, year listed, name of listicle, and placement
Publisher	Year	Listicle	Placement	Ref.
GQ Korea	2019	Men of the Year	Placed	
