= SBS Drama Awards =

South Korea Drama Awards

- Current: 2025 SBS Drama Awards
- Awarded for: Excellence in Drama and Television Arts
- Location: Seoul
- Country: South Korea
- Presented by: Seoul Broadcasting System
- First award: 1993
- Final award: 2024
- Website: SBS 연기대상

Korean name
- Hangul: SBS 연기대상
- Hanja: SBS 演技大賞
- RR: SBS yeongi daesang
- MR: SBS yŏn'gi taesang

The SBS Drama Awards (Korean: SBS 연기대상), also known as SBS Awards Festival, is an awards ceremony presented annually by Seoul Broadcasting System (SBS) for outstanding achievements in Korean dramas aired on its network. It is held annually on December 31. The highest honor of the ceremony is the "Grand Prize" (대상; daesang), awarded to the best actor or actress of the year.

== Grand Prize (Daesang) ==
No.	Year	Winner	Drama	Ref.
1	1993	Lee Mi-sook	How's Your Husband?	
2	1994	Choi Myung-gil	Marriage	
3	1995	Choi Min-soo	Sandglass	
4	1996	Park Geun-hyung	The Brothers' River	
5	1997	—N/a	—N/a	
6	1998	Kim Hee-sun	Mister Q	
7	1999	Shim Eun-ha	Trap of Youth	
8	2000	Go Doo-shim	Virtue	
9	2001	Kang Soo-yeon, Jeon In-hwa	Ladies of the Palace	
10	2002	Ahn Jae-mo	Rustic Period	
11	2003	Lee Byung-hun	All In	
12	2004	Park Shin-yang, Kim Jung-eun	Lovers in Paris	
13	2005	Jeon Do-yeon	Lovers in Prague	
14	2006	Han Hye-sook	Dear Heaven	
15	2007	Park Shin-yang	War of Money	
15	2007	Kim Hee-ae	My Husband's Woman	
16	2008	Moon Geun-young	Painter of the Wind	
17	2009	Jang Seo-hee	Temptation of Wife	
18	2010	Go Hyun-jung	Big Thing	
19	2011	Han Suk-kyu	Deep Rooted Tree	
20	2012	Son Hyun-joo	The Chaser	
21	2013	Lee Bo-young	I Can Hear Your Voice	
22	2014	Jun Ji-hyun	My Love from the Star	
23	2015	Joo Won	Yong-pal	
24	2016	Han Suk-kyu	Romantic Doctor, Teacher Kim	
25	2017	Ji Sung	Defendant	
26	2018	Kam Woo-sung	Should We Kiss First?	
26	2018	Kim Sun-ah	Should We Kiss First?	
27	2019	Kim Nam-gil	The Fiery Priest	
28	2020	Namkoong Min	Hot Stove League	
29	2021	Kim So-yeon	The Penthouse: War in Life	
30	2022	Kim Nam-gil	Through the Darkness	
31	2023	Lee Je-hoon	Taxi Driver 2	
31	2023	Kim Tae-ri	Revenant	
32	2024	Jang Na-ra	Good Partner	
33	2025	Lee Je-hoon	Taxi Driver 3	

== SBS Special Award ==
Year	Winner	Drama
2013	Zo In-sung	That Winter, the Wind Blows
2014	Lee Jong-suk	Pinocchio, Doctor Stranger

== Top Excellence in Acting Awards ==
=== Best Actor ===
Year	Winner	Drama
1996	Lee Jung-gil	Beginning of Happiness
1998	Kim Min-jong	Mister Q
1999	Lee Geung-young	Love Story: Rose, Crystal
2000	Park In-hwan	Wang Rung's Land
2001	Cho Jae-hyun	Piano
2002	Jang Hyuk	Great Ambition, Successful Story of a Bright Girl
2003	Cha In-pyo	Perfect Love
2004	Zo In-sung	Something Happened in Bali
2005	Kim Joo-hyuk	Lovers in Prague
2006	Kim Kap-soo	Yeon Gaesomun
2007	Jun Kwang-ryul	The King and I
2008	Lee Joon-gi	Iljimae
2009	So Ji-sub	Cain and Abel

=== Best Actress ===
Year	Winner	Drama
1996	Lee Hwi-hyang	The Beginning of Happiness
1998	Lee Young-ae	Romance
1999	Kim Young-ae	Waves
2000	Chae Shi-ra	Cheers for Women
2001	Do Ji-won	Ladies of the Palace
2002	Jeon Do-yeon	Shoot for the Stars
2003	Song Hye-kyo	All In
2004	Ha Ji-won	Something Happened in Bali
2005	Kim Mi-sook	Queen's Conditions
2006	Son Ye-jin	Alone in Love
2007	Lee Yo-won	Surgeon Bong Dal-hee
2007	Park Jin-hee	War of Money
2008	Kim Ha-neul	On Air
2008	Song Yun-ah	On Air
2009	Kim Mi-sook	Brilliant Legacy

=== Best Actor in a Miniseries ===
Year	Winner	Drama
2012	Lee Min-ho	Faith
2013	So Ji-sub	Master's Sun
2014	Park Yoochun	Three Days
2015	Park Yoochun	A Girl Who Sees Smells
2019	Lee Seung-gi	Vagabond

=== Best Actress in a Miniseries ===
Year	Winner	Drama
2012	Jung Ryeo-won	History of a Salaryman
2013	Song Hye-kyo	That Winter, the Wind Blows
2014	Gong Hyo-jin	It's Okay, That's Love
2015	Kim Tae-hee	Yong-pal
2019	Bae Suzy	Vagabond

=== Best Actor in a Mid-Length Drama ===
Year	Winner	Drama
2010	Hyun Bin	Secret Garden
2010	Kwon Sang-woo	Big Thing
2011	Ji Sung	Protect the Boss
2011	Lee Min-ho	City Hunter
2012	So Ji-sub	Phantom
2013	Lee Min-ho	The Heirs
2014	Kim Soo-hyun	My Love from the Star
2015	Yoo Jun-sang	Heard It Through the Grapevine
2015	Cho Jae-hyun	Punch
2019	Jo Jung-suk	Nokdu Flower
2020	Uhm Ki-joon	The Penthouse: War in Life

=== Best Actress in a Mid-Length Drama ===
Year	Winner	Drama
2010	Ha Ji-won	Secret Garden
2011	Choi Kang-hee	Protect the Boss
2012	Han Ji-min	Rooftop Prince
2013	Lee Yo-won	Empire of Gold
2014	Park Shin-hye	Pinocchio
2015	Ji Sung	Kill me heal me
2015	Choi Myung-gil	Punch
2019	Lee Hanee	The Fiery Priest
2020	Kim So-yeon	The Penthouse: War in Life
2020	Eugene	The Penthouse: War in Life
2020	Lee Ji-ah	The Penthouse: War in Life

=== Best Actor in a Special Planning Drama ===
Year	Winner	Drama
2010	Lee Beom-soo	Giant
2011	Jang Hyuk	Midas
2011	Kim Rae-won	A Thousand Days' Promise

=== Best Actress in a Special Planning Drama ===
Year	Winner	Drama
2010	Kim Jung-eun	I Am Legend
2011	Soo Ae	A Thousand Days' Promise

=== Best Actor in a Serial Drama ===
Year	Winner	Drama
2010	Son Hyun-joo	Definitely Neighbors
2011	Lee Dong-wook	Scent of a Woman
2012	Jang Dong-gun	A Gentleman's Dignity
2013	Jun Kwang-ryul	Passionate Love
2014	Lee Je-hoon	Secret Door
2015	Yoo Ah-in	Six Flying Dragons
2016	Jang Keun-suk	Jackpot
2019	Seo Do-young	Gangnam Scandal, Want a Taste?

=== Best Actress in a Serial Drama ===
Year	Winner	Drama
2010	Yoo Ho-jeong	Definitely Neighbors
2011	Kim Sun-a	Scent of a Woman
2012	Kim Ha-neul	A Gentleman's Dignity
2013	Nam Sang-mi	Goddess of Marriage
2014	Hwang Jung-eum	Endless Love
2015	Kim Hyun-joo	I Have a Lover
2016	Kim Hae-sook	Yes, That's How It Is
2019	Shim Yi-young	Want a Taste?

=== Best Actor in a Genre & Fantasy Drama ===
Year	Winner	Drama
2016	Kim Rae-won	The Doctors
2016	Lee Min-ho	Legend of the Blue Sea

=== Best Actress in a Genre & Fantasy Drama ===
Year	Winner	Drama
2016	Park Shin-hye	The Doctors

=== Best Actor in a Romantic-Comedy Drama ===
Year	Winner	Drama
2016	Jo Jung-suk	Don't Dare to Dream
2016	Namkoong Min	Beautiful Gong Shim

=== Best Actress in a Romantic-Comedy Drama ===
Year	Winner	Drama
2016	Gong Hyo-jin	Don't Dare to Dream

=== Best Actor in a Monday–Tuesday Drama ===
Year	Winner	Drama
2017	Namkoong Min	Distorted
2018	Lee Je-hoon	Where Stars Land

=== Best Actress in a Monday–Tuesday Drama ===
Year	Winner	Drama
2017	Lee Bo-young	Whisper
2018	Shin Hye-sun	Still 17

=== Best Actor in a Wednesday–Thursday Drama ===
Year	Winner	Drama
2017	Lee Jong-suk	While You Were Sleeping
2018	Choi Jin-hyuk	The Last Empress
2018	Shin Sung-rok	The Last Empress

=== Best Actress in a Wednesday–Thursday Drama ===
Year	Winner	Drama
2017	Bae Suzy	While You Were Sleeping
2018	Jang Na-ra	The Last Empress

=== Best Actor in a Daily/Weekend Drama ===
Year	Winner	Drama
2017	Son Chang-min	Band of Sisters
2018	Kim Jaewon	Let Me Introduce Her

=== Best Actress in a Daily/Weekend Drama ===
Year	Winner	Drama
2017	Jang Seo-hee	Band of Sisters
2018	Song Yoon-ah	Secret Mother

=== Best Actor in a Miniseries Fantasy/Romance Drama ===
Year	Winner	Drama
2020	Lee Min-ho	The King: Eternal Monarch

=== Best Actress in a Miniseries Fantasy/Romance Drama ===
Year	Winner	Drama
2020	Park Eun-bin	Do You Like Brahms?

=== Best Actor in a Miniseries Genre/Action Drama ===
Year	Winner	Drama
2020	Ju Ji-hoon	Hyena
2023	Park Sung-woong	The Killing Vote

=== Best Actress in a Miniseries Genre/Action Drama ===
Year	Winner	Drama
2020	Kim Seo-hyung	Nobody Knows
2023	Moon Chae-won	Payback

=== Best Actor in a Miniseries Genre/Fantasy Drama ===
Year	Winner	Drama
2021	Lee Je-hoon	Taxi Driver
2022	Huh Joon-ho	Why Her
2022	Kim Rae-won	The First Responders

=== Best Actor in a Miniseries Fantasy Drama ===
Year	Winner	Drama
2022	Lee Joon-gi	Again My Life

=== Best Actress in a Miniseries Genre/Fantasy Drama ===
Year	Winner	Drama
2021	Kim You-jung	Lovers of the Red Sky
2022	Seo Hyun-jin	Why Her

=== Best Actor in a Miniseries Romance/Comedy Drama ===
Year	Winner	Drama
2021	Lee Sang-yoon	One the Woman
2022	Ahn Hyo-seop	Business Proposal
2023	Song Kang	My Demon

=== Best Actress in a Miniseries Romance/Comedy Drama ===
Year	Winner	Drama
2021	Lee Hanee	One the Woman
2022	Kim Se-jeong	Business Proposal
2023	Kim You-jung	My Demon

== Excellence in Acting Awards ==
=== Best Actor ===
Year	Winner	Drama
1996	Jo Min-ki	City Men and Women
1998	Lee Geung-young	Romance, Eun-shil
1999	Kim Suk-hoon	Tomato
2000	Kim Sang-joong	Legends of Love, SWAT Police
2001	Ahn Jae-mo	Rustic Period
2001	Kim Min-jong	Guardian Angel
2001	Noh Joo-hyun	Why Can't We Stop Them
2001	Sunwoo Jae-duk	Morning Without Parting

=== Best Actress ===
Year	Winner	Drama
1996	Kim Nam-joo	City Men and Women
1998	Song Yun-ah	Mister Q, 공포의 눈동자
1999	Yoo Ho-jeong	Trap of Youth
2000	Kim Hyun-joo	Love Story: Insomnia, Manual and Orange Juice, Virtue
2000	Kang Sung-yeon	Virtue, Rookie
2001	Choi Ji-woo	Beautiful Days
2001	Kim Mi-sook	Well Known Woman
2001	Kim Won-hee	
2001	Song Chae-hwan	Morning Without Parting, Way of Living: Couple

=== Best Actor in a Miniseries ===
Year	Winner	Drama
2006	Eric Mun	Invincible Parachute Agent
2007	Kim Sang-joong	My Husband's Woman
2007	Yoo Jun-sang	Catching Up with Gangnam Moms
2012	Kim Sang-joong	The Chaser
2013	Lee Jong-suk	I Can Hear Your Voice
2014	Sung Dong-il	It's Okay, That's Love
2015	Park Hyung-sik	High Society
2019	Lee Sang-yoon	VIP

=== Best Actress in a Miniseries ===
Year	Winner	Drama
2006	Shim Hye-jin	Please Come Back, Soon-ae
2007	Ha Hee-ra	Catching Up with Gangnam Moms
2012	Kim Sung-ryung	The Chaser
2013	Sung Yu-ri	The Secret of Birth
2014	So Yi-hyun	Three Days
2015	Moon Geun-young	The Village: Achiara's Secret
2019	Lee Se-young	Doctor John

=== Best Actor in a Mid-Length Drama ===
Year	Winner	Drama
2002	Go Soo	Age of Innocence
2003	Ji Sung	All In
2003	Joo Jin-mo	Punch
2004	Ji Jin-hee	Miss Kim's Million Dollar Quest
2005	Son Chang-min	Bad Housewife
2008	Park Yong-ha	On Air
2009	Cha Seung-won	City Hall
2010	Lee Seung-gi	My Girlfriend Is a Nine-Tailed Fox
2011	Jung Gyu-woon	Sign
2012	Park Yoochun	Rooftop Prince
2013	Sung Dong-il	Jang Ok-jung, Living by Love
2014	Shin Sung-rok	My Love from the Star
2015	Ju Ji-hoon	Mask
2019	Kim Sung-kyun	The Fiery Priest
2020	Bong Tae-gyu	The Penthouse: War in Life
2020	Yoon Jong-hoon	The Penthouse: War in Life

=== Best Actress in a Drama Special ===
Year	Winner	Drama
2002	Kim Ji-ho	Affection
2003	Choi Ji-woo	Stairway to Heaven
2004	Kim Hyun-joo	Miss Kim's Million Dollar Quest
2005	Lee Da-hae	Green Rose, My Girl
2008	Choi Kang-hee	My Sweet Seoul
2009	Kim Sun-a	City Hall
2010	Shin Min-a	My Girlfriend Is a Nine-Tailed Fox
2011	Shin Se-kyung	Deep Rooted Tree
2012	Jeong Yu-mi	Rooftop Prince
2013	Park Shin-hye	The Heirs
2014	Han Ye-seul	Birth of a Beauty
2015	Go Ah-sung	Heard It Through the Grapevine
2019	Han Ye-ri	Nokdu Flower
2020	Shin Eun-kyung	The Penthouse: War in Life

=== Best Actor in a Special Planning Drama ===
Year	Winner	Drama
2002	Han Jae-suk	Great Ambition
2003	So Ji-sub	Thousand Years of Love
2004	Lee Dong-gun	Stained Glass, Lovers in Paris
2005	Go Soo	Green Rose
2008	Jang Hyuk	Tazza
2009	Lee Seung-gi	Brilliant Legacy
2009	Park Si-hoo	Family's Honor
2010	Jeong Bo-seok	Giant
2011	Jun Kwang-ryul	Warrior Baek Dong-soo

=== Best Actress in a Special Planning Drama ===
Year	Winner	Drama
2002	Kim Hyun-joo	Glass Slippers
2003	Sung Yu-ri	Thousand Years of Love
2004	Song Yun-ah	Into the Storm
2005	Lee Yo-won	Fashion 70's
2008	Han Ye-seul	Tazza
2009	Han Hyo-joo	Brilliant Legacy
2010	Park Jin-hee	Giant
2011	Yoon So-yi	Warrior Baek Dong-soo

=== Best Actor in a Serial Drama ===
Year	Winner	Drama
2002	Kim Tae-woo	That Woman Catches People
2003	Kim Yeong-cheol	Rustic Period
2004	Lee Soon-jae	The Land
2005	Yoo Jun-sang	The Land
2006	Lee Hoon	Love and Ambition
2007	Im Chae-moo	Golden Bride
2007	Oh Man-seok	The King and I
2008	Ahn Nae-sang	First Wives' Club
2009	Byun Woo-min	Temptation of Wife
2010	Song Chang-eui	Life Is Beautiful
2011	Um Ki-joon	Scent of a Woman
2012	Kim Soo-ro	A Gentleman's Dignity
2013	Kim Ji-hoon	Goddess of Marriage
2014	Song Chang-eui	Thrice Married Woman
2015	Byun Yo-han	Six Flying Dragons
2016	Yeo Jin-goo	Jackpot

=== Best Actress in a Serial Drama ===
Year	Winner	Drama
2002	Kim Ji-soo	Like a Flowing River
2003	Choi Myung-gil	South of the Sun
2004	Yoo Sun	Into the Storm
2005	Kyeon Mi-ri	Love and Sympathy
2006	Kim Ji-young	My Lovely Fool
2007	Kyeon Mi-ri	Golden Bride
2007	Yoo Sun	That Woman Is Scary
2008	Kim Hye-sun	First Wives' Club
2008	Oh Hyun-kyung	First Wives' Club
2009	Kim Seo-hyung	Temptation of Wife
2010	Kang Sung-yeon	Wife Returns
2011	Lee So-yeon	My Love By My Side
2012	Shin Eun-kyung	Still You
2013	Wang Bit-na	Two Women's Room
2014	Choi Jung-yoon	Cheongdam-dong Scandal
2015	Shin Se-kyung	Six Flying Dragons
2016	Kim Ji-young	Here Comes Love

=== Best Actor in a Drama Short ===
Year	Winner	Drama
2002	Shin Goo	You Are My World
2003	Kim Young-ho	Ang-sook
2003	Sung Ji-ru	Ang-sook
2013	Jung Eun-woo	Stranger
2014	Lee Deok-hwa	Wonderful Day in October
2015	Lee Han-wi	My Mother Is a Daughter-In-Law

=== Best Actress in a Drama Short ===
Year	Winner	Drama
2002	Na Moon-hee	You Are My World
2003	Go Doo-shim	Dotorimuk (Acorn Jelly)
2005	Ha Hee-ra	My Love Toram
2013	Kim Mi-sook	Case No. 113
2014	Oh Hyun-kyung	A Mother's Choice
2015	Jeon Mi-seon	The Return of Hwang Geum-bok

=== Best Actor in a Fantasy Drama ===
Year	Winner	Drama
2016	Kang Ha-neul	Moon Lovers: Scarlet Heart Ryeo

=== Best Actress in a Fantasy Drama ===
Year	Winner	Drama
2016	Oh Yeon-seo	Come Back Mister

=== Best Actor in a Genre Drama ===
Year	Winner	Drama
2016	Yoo Seung-ho	Remember: War of the Son
2016	Yoo Yeon-seok	Romantic Doctor, Teacher Kim

=== Best Actress in a Genre Drama ===
Year	Winner	Drama
2016	Seo Hyun-jin	Romantic Doctor, Teacher Kim

=== Best Actor in a Romantic-Comedy Drama ===
Year	Winner	Drama
2016	Kang Min-hyuk	Entertainer

=== Best Actress in a Romantic-Comedy Drama ===
Year	Winner	Drama
2016	Bang Min-ah	Beautiful Gong Shim

=== Best Actor in a Monday–Tuesday Drama ===
Year	Winner	Drama
2017	Kwon Yul	Whisper
2018	Yang Se-jong	Still 17

=== Best Actress in a Monday–Tuesday Drama ===
Year	Winner	Drama
2017	Park Se-young	Whisper
2018	Chae Soo-bin	Where Stars Land

=== Best Actor in a Wednesday–Thursday Drama ===
Year	Winner	Drama
2017	Lee Sang-yeob	While You Were Sleeping
2018	Yoon Shi-yoon	Your Honor

=== Best Actress in a Wednesday–Thursday Drama ===
Year	Winner	Drama
2017	Nam Ji-hyun	Suspicious Partner
2018	Seo Ji-hye	Heart Surgeons

=== Best Actor in a Daily/Weekend Drama ===
Year	Winner	Drama
2017	Ahn Nae-sang	Band of Sisters
2018	Jung Woong-in	Mrs. Ma, Nemesis

=== Best Actress in a Daily/Weekend Drama ===
Year	Winner	Drama
2017	Son Yeo-eun	Band of Sisters
2018	Kim So-yeon	Secret Mother

=== Best Actor in a Miniseries Fantasy/Romance Drama ===
Year	Winner	Drama
2020	Kim Min-jae	Do You Like Brahms?

=== Best Actor in a Miniseries Genre/Action Drama ===
Year	Winner	Drama
2020	Ahn Hyo-seop	Dr. Romantic 2
2023	Lee Joon	The Escape of the Seven
2023	Hong Kyung	Revenant

=== Best Actress in Miniseries Fantasy/Romance Drama ===
Year	Winner	Drama
2020	Kim You-jung	Backstreet Rookie

=== Best Actress in Miniseries Genre/Action Drama ===
Year	Winner	Drama
2020	Lee Sung-kyung	Dr. Romantic 2
2023	Lee Yu-bi	The Escape of the Seven

=== Best Actor in a Mini-Series Genre/Fantasy Drama ===
Year	Winner	Drama
2021	Ahn Hyo-seop	Lovers of the Red Sky
2022	Jin Seon-kyu	Through the Darkness

=== Best Actress in a Mini-Series Genre/Fantasy Drama ===
Year	Winner	Drama
2021	Esom	Taxi Driver
2022	Gong Seung-yeon	The First Responders

=== Best Actor in a Mini-Series Romance/Comedy Drama ===
Year	Winner	Drama
2021	Kim Joo-hun	Now, We Are Breaking Up
2022	Kim Min-kyu	Business Proposal
2023	Ryeoun	The Secret Romantic Guesthouse

=== Best Actress in a Mini-Series Romance/Comedy Drama ===
Year	Winner	Drama
2021	Jin Seo-yeon	One the Woman
2022	Kim Ji-eun	One Dollar Lawyer
2023	Shin Ye-eun	The Secret Romantic Guesthouse

== Supporting Awards ==
=== Best Supporting Actor ===
Year	Winner	Category	Drama
1998	Kwon Hae-hyo	—N/a	Mister Q, Eun-shil
1999	Cho Jae-hyun	—N/a	Happy Together
2000	Lee Won-jong	—N/a	
2001	Choi Jong-hwan	—N/a	Ladies of the Palace
2001	Son Hyun-joo	—N/a	Pardon
2002	Lee Won-jong	—N/a	Rustic Period
2002	Park Jun-gyu	—N/a	Rustic Period
2003	Huh Joon-ho	—N/a	All In
2004	Ryu Soo-young	—N/a	Jang Gil-san
2005	Kim Kap-soo	—N/a	The Land
2006	Gong Hyung-jin	Miniseries	Alone in Love
2006	Jeon No-min	Serial Drama	Love and Ambition
2007	Lee Won-jong	Miniseries	War of Money
2007	Oh Dae-gyu	Serial Drama	Love and Hate, First Wives' Club
2008	Lee Moon-sik	Drama Special	Iljimae
2008	Son Hyun-joo	Special Planning Drama	Tazza
2008	Lee Han-wi	Serial Drama	Glass Castle
2009	Baek Seung-hyeon	Drama Special	Cain and Abel
2009	Kang Seok-woo	Special Planning Drama	Smile, You
2009	Choi Jun-yong	Serial Drama	Temptation of Wife
2010	Lee Jae-yong	Drama Special	Big Thing
2010	Lee Deok-hwa	Special Planning Drama	Giant
2010	Shin Sung-rok	Weekend/Daily Drama	Definitely Neighbors
2017	Kim Won-hae	Wednesday–Thursday Drama	While You Were Sleeping
2018	Im Won-hee	—N/a	Wok of Love
2019	Go Jun	—N/a	The Fiery Priest
2020	Kim Joo-hun	—N/a	Dr. Romantic 2
2020	Park Eun-seok	—N/a	The Penthouse: War in Life 1
2021	Kim Eui-sung	Mini-Series Genre/Fantasy Drama	Taxi Driver
2021	Song Won-seok	Mini-Series Romance/Comedy Drama	One the Woman
2022	Kang Ki-doong	Mini-Series Genre/Fantasy Drama	The First Responders
2022	Park Jin-woo	Mini-Series Romance/Comedy Drama	One Dollar Lawyer
2023	Bae Yoo-ram	Seasonal Drama	Taxi Driver 2
2023	Jang Hyuk-jin	Seasonal Drama	Taxi Driver 2
2023	Jeong Soon-won	Mini-Series Romance/Comedy Drama	My Demon, Trolley

=== Best Supporting Actress ===
Year	Winner	Category	Drama
1998	Kim Eun-jung	—N/a	Mister Q, Eun-shil
2000	Kim Sung-ryung	—N/a	Juliet's Man
2000	Lee Mi-young	—N/a	Who Are You
2001	Han Young-sook	—N/a	Ladies of the Palace
2002	Kim Gyu-ri	—N/a	Glass Slippers
2002	Lee Se-eun	—N/a	Rustic Period
2003	Kim Jung-hwa	—N/a	Into the Sun
2003	Yoo Sun	—N/a	South of the Sun
2004	Shin Yi	—N/a	Something Happened in Bali
2005	Song Ok-sook	—N/a	Fashion 70's
2006	Oh Yoon-ah	Miniseries	Alone in Love
2006	Chu Sang-mi	Serial Drama	Love and Ambition
2007	Ha Yoo-mi	Miniseries	My Husband's Woman
2007	Kim Mi-sook	Miniseries	Lobbyist
2007	Lee Se-eun	Serial Drama	Yeon Gaesomun
2008	Kim Ja-ok	Drama Special	Working Mom
2008	Kim So-yeon	Special Planning Drama	Gourmet
2008	Kim Hee-jung	Serial Drama	First Wives' Club
2009	Na Young-hee	Drama Special	Style
2009	Cha Hwa-yeon	Special Planning Drama	Temptation of an Angel
2009	Lee Hwi-hyang	Serial Drama	Loving You a Thousand Times
2010	Lee Soo-kyung	Drama Special	Big Thing
2010	Hong Ji-min	Special Planning Drama	I Am Legend
2010	Im Ji-eun	Weekend/Daily Drama	Three Sisters
2017	Park Jin-joo	Wednesday–Thursday Drama	Reunited Worlds
2018	Ye Ji-won	—N/a	Should We Kiss First?, Still 17
2019	Lee Chung-ah	—N/a	VIP
2019	Moon Jeong-hee	—N/a	Vagabond
2020	Jin Kyung	—N/a	Dr. Romantic 2
2021	Cha Ji-yeon	Mini-Series Genre/Fantasy Drama	Taxi Driver
2021	Park Hyo-joo	Mini-Series Romance/Comedy Drama	Now, We Are Breaking Up
2022	Kim Jae-kyung	Mini-Series Genre/Fantasy Drama	Again My Life
2022	Gong Min-jung	Mini-Series Romance/Comedy Drama	One Dollar Lawyer
2023	Son Ji-yoon	Seasonal Drama	The First Responders 2
2023	Seo Jung-yeon	Miniseries Romance/Comedy Drama	My Demon, Trolley

== Special Acting Awards ==
=== Actor ===
Year	Winner	Category	Drama
1996	Moon Oh-jang	—N/a	
1998	Lee Nak-hoon	—N/a	
2011	Park Yeong-gyu	Drama Special	Protect the Boss
2011	Yoon Je-moon	Special Planning Drama	Midas
2011	Jin Tae-hyun	Serial Drama	Pure Pumpkin Flower
2012	Lee Deok-hwa	Miniseries	History of a Salaryman
2012	Kwak Do-won	Drama Special	Phantom
2012	Kim Min-jong	Serial Drama	A Gentleman's Dignity
2012	Lee Jong-hyuk	Serial Drama	A Gentleman's Dignity
2013	Jung Woong-in	Miniseries	I Can Hear Your Voice
2013	Lee Hyo-jung	Drama Special	Jang Ok-jung, Living by Love
2013	Jang Hyun-sung	Serial Drama	Goddess of Marriage
2014	Lee Kwang-soo	Miniseries	It's Okay, That's Love
2014	Kim Chang-wan	Drama Special	My Love from the Star
2014	Jung Woong-in	Serial Drama	Endless Love
2015	Namkoong Min	Miniseries	A Girl Who Sees Smells
2015	Jang Hyun-sung	Drama Special	Heard It Through the Grapevine
2015	Park Hyuk-kwon	Serial Drama	Six Flying Dragons
2016	Sung Dong-il	Fantasy Drama	Legend of the Blue Sea
2016	Park Sung-woong	Genre Drama	Remember: War of the Son
2016	On Joo-wan	Romantic-Comedy Drama	Beautiful Gong Shim
2016	Song Jae-rim	Serial Drama	Our Gap-soon

=== Actress ===
Year	Winner	Category	Drama
1996	Yeo Woon-kay	—N/a	LA Arirang
2007	Như Quỳnh	—N/a	Golden Bride
2011	Song Ok-sook	Drama Special	Deep Rooted Tree
2011	Lee Mi-sook	Special Planning Drama	A Thousand Days' Promise
2011	Kim Hye-ok	Serial Drama	Scent of a Woman
2012	Jang Shin-young	Miniseries	The Chaser
2012	Lee Jin	Drama Special	The Great Seer
2012	Kim Jung-nan	Serial Drama	A Gentleman's Dignity
2013	Kim Mi-kyung	Miniseries	Master's Sun
2013	Kim Sung-ryung	Drama Special	The Heirs
2013	Jang Young-nam	Serial Drama	Goddess of Marriage
2014	Jin Kyung	Miniseries	It's Okay, That's Love, Pinocchio
2014	Go Doo-shim	Drama Special	One Warm Word
2014	Kim Hye-sun	Serial Drama	Cheongdam-dong Scandal
2015	Lee Da-hee	Miniseries	Mrs. Cop
2015	Yoo In-young	Drama Special	Mask
2015	Park Han-byul	Serial Drama	I Have a Lover
2016	Seohyun	Fantasy Drama	Moon Lovers: Scarlet Heart Ryeo
2016	Jun Hyo-seong	Genre Drama	Wanted
2016	Seo Ji-hye	Romantic-Comedy Drama	Don't Dare to Dream
2016	Kim So-eun	Serial Drama	Our Gap-soon

== Producer's Award ==
Year	Winner	Drama
2006	Kim Myung-min	Bad Family
2006	Kim Jung-eun	Lovers
2007	Lee Beom-soo	Surgeon Bong Dal-hee
2007	Bae Jong-ok	My Husband's Woman
2008	Bong Tae-gyu	Working Mom
2008	Moon Jeong-hee	My Sweet Seoul
2009	Jung Kyung-ho	Ja Myung Go
2009	Yoon Jung-hee	Family's Honor
2010	Cha In-pyo	Big Thing
2010	Park Sang-min	Giant
2010	Han Hye-jin	Jejungwon
2011	Song Joong-ki	Deep Rooted Tree
2011	Lee Yo-won	49 Days
2012	Park Geun-hyung	The Chaser
2012	Chae Shi-ra	Five Fingers
2013	Lee Bo-young	I Can Hear Your Voice
2014	Jun Ji-hyun	My Love from the Star
2015	Kim Rae-won	Punch
2018	Um Ki-joon	Heart Surgeons
2018	Nam Sang-mi	Let Me Introduce Her
2019	Jang Na-ra	VIP
2020	Joo Won	Alice
2021	Choi Woo-shik	Our Beloved Summer
2021	Kim Da-mi	Our Beloved Summer
2022	Namkoong Min	One Dollar Lawyer

== Top 10 Stars ==
Year	Winner	Drama
2001	Cho Jae-hyun	Piano
2001	Choi Ji-woo	Beautiful Days
2001	Do Ji-won	Ladies of the Palace
2001	Jeon In-hwa	Ladies of the Palace
2001	Kang Soo-yeon	Ladies of the Palace
2001	Kim Min-jong	Guardian Angel
2001	Lee Byung-hun	Beautiful Days
2001	Ryu Si-won	Beautiful Days
2001	Song Hye-kyo	Guardian Angel
2001	Song Seung-heon	Law Firm
2002	Ahn Jae-mo	Rustic Period
2002	Go Soo	Age of Innocence
2002	Han Jae-suk	Great Ambition, Glass Slippers
2002	Jang Hyuk	Great Ambition, Successful Story of a Bright Girl
2002	Jang Na-ra	Successful Story of a Bright Girl
2002	Jeon Do-yeon	Shoot for the Stars
2002	Zo In-sung	Shoot for the Stars
2002	Kim Hyun-joo	Glass Slippers
2002	Kim Jaewon	Romance
2002	So Yoo-jin	Rival
2003	Cha In-pyo	Perfect Love
2003	Choi Myung-gil	South of the Sun
2003	Choi Ji-woo	Stairway to Heaven
2003	Kim Hee-ae	Perfect Love
2003	Kim Yeong-cheol	Rustic Period
2003	Kwon Sang-woo	Stairway to Heaven, Into the Sun
2003	Lee Byung-hun	All In
2003	So Ji-sub	Thousand Years of Love
2003	Song Hye-kyo	All In
2003	Sung Yu-ri	Thousand Years of Love
2004	Ha Ji-won	Something Happened in Bali
2004	Ji Sung	Save the Last Dance for Me
2004	Zo In-sung	Something Happened in Bali
2004	Kim Hyun-joo	Miss Kim's Million Dollar Quest
2004	Kim Jung-eun	Lovers in Paris
2004	Kim Rae-won	Love Story in Harvard
2004	Kim Tae-hee	Love Story in Harvard
2004	Lee Dong-gun	Stained Glass, Lovers in Paris
2004	Park Shin-yang	Lovers in Paris
2004	Song Yun-ah	Into the Storm
2005	Go Hyun-jung	Spring Day
2005	Go Soo	Green Rose
2005	Jeon Do-yeon	Lovers in Prague
2005	Jo Hyun-jae	Only You
2005	Zo In-sung	Spring Day
2005	Joo Jin-mo	Fashion 70's
2005	Kim Hyun-joo	The Land
2005	Kim Joo-hyuk	Lovers in Prague
2005	Kim Min-jung	Fashion 70's
2005	Lee Yo-won	Fashion 70's
2006	Han Hye-sook	Dear Heaven
2006	Kim Jung-eun	Lovers
2006	Kim Kap-soo	Yeon Gaesomun
2006	Lee Bo-young	Queen of the Game
2006	Lee Da-hae	My Girl
2006	Lee Seo-jin	Lovers
2006	Eric Mun	Invincible Parachute Agent
2006	Park Jin-hee	Please Come Back, Soon-ae
2006	Shim Hye-jin	Please Come Back, Soon-ae
2006	Son Ye-jin	Alone in Love
2007	Jun Kwang-ryul	The King and I
2007	Kim Hee-ae	My Husband's Woman
2007	Lee Beom-soo	Surgeon Bong Dal-hee
2007	Lee Yo-won	Surgeon Bong Dal-hee
2007	Lee Young-ah	Golden Bride
2007	Oh Ji-ho	Get Karl! Oh Soo-jung
2007	Park Jin-hee	War of Money
2007	Park Shin-yang	War of Money
2007	Shin Eun-kyung	Bad Couple
2007	Song Chang-eui	Golden Bride
2008	Ahn Nae-sang	First Wives' Club
2008	Han Ye-seul	Tazza
2008	Jang Hyuk	Tazza
2008	Kim Ha-neul	On Air
2008	Kim Rae-won	Gourmet
2008	Lee Joon-gi	Iljimae
2008	Moon Geun-young	Painter of the Wind
2008	Oh Hyun-kyung	First Wives' Club
2008	Park Yong-ha	On Air
2008	Song Yun-ah	On Air
2009	Bae Soo-bin	Brilliant Legacy
2009	Cha Seung-won	City Hall
2009	Han Hyo-joo	Brilliant Legacy
2009	Jang Keun-suk	You're Beautiful
2009	Jang Seo-hee	Temptation of Wife
2009	Kim Hye-soo	Style
2009	Kim Sun-a	City Hall
2009	Lee Seung-gi	Brilliant Legacy
2009	Lee Soo-kyung	Loving You a Thousand Times
2009	So Ji-sub	Cain and Abel
2010	Go Hyun-jung	Big Thing
2010	Ha Ji-won	Secret Garden
2010	Hyun Bin	Secret Garden
2010	Jeong Bo-seok	Giant
2010	Kim So-yeon	Prosecutor Princess, Dr. Champ
2010	Kwon Sang-woo	Big Thing
2010	Lee Beom-soo	Giant
2010	Lee Seung-gi	My Girlfriend Is a Nine-Tailed Fox
2010	Park Jin-hee	Giant
2010	Shin Min-a	My Girlfriend Is a Nine-Tailed Fox
2011	Choi Kang-hee	Protect the Boss
2011	Han Suk-kyu	Deep Rooted Tree
2011	Jang Hyuk	Deep Rooted Tree
2011	Ji Sung	Protect the Boss
2011	Kim Rae-won	A Thousand Days' Promise
2011	Kim Sun-a	Scent of a Woman
2011	Lee Dong-wook	Scent of a Woman
2011	Lee Min-ho	City Hunter
2011	Lee Yo-won	49 Days
2011	Soo Ae	A Thousand Days' Promise
2012	Chae Shi-ra	Five Fingers
2012	Han Ji-min	Rooftop Prince
2012	Jang Dong-gun	A Gentleman's Dignity
2012	Jung Ryeo-won	History of a Salaryman
2012	Kim Ha-neul	A Gentleman's Dignity
2012	Lee Min-ho	Faith
2012	Park Yoochun	Rooftop Prince
2012	Shin Eun-kyung	Still You
2012	So Ji-sub	Phantom
2012	Son Hyun-joo	The Chaser
2013	Zo In-sung	That Winter, the Wind Blows
2013	Kim Woo-bin	The Heirs
2013	Lee Bo-young	I Can Hear Your Voice
2013	Lee Jong-suk	I Can Hear Your Voice
2013	Lee Min-ho	The Heirs
2013	Lee Yo-won	Empire of Gold
2013	Nam Sang-mi	Goddess of Marriage
2013	Park Shin-hye	The Heirs
2013	So Ji-sub	Master's Sun
2013	Song Hye-kyo	That Winter, the Wind Blows
2014	Han Ye-seul	Birth of a Beauty
2014	Hwang Jung-eum	Endless Love
2014	Zo In-sung	It's Okay, That's Love
2014	Joo Sang-wook	Birth of a Beauty
2014	Jun Ji-hyun	My Love from the Star
2014	Kim Soo-hyun	My Love from the Star
2014	Lee Je-hoon	Secret Door
2014	Lee Jong-suk	Pinocchio, Doctor Stranger
2014	Park Shin-hye	Pinocchio
2014	Park Yoochun	Three Days
2015	Joo Won	Yong-pal
2015	Kim Hyun-joo	I Have a Lover
2015	Ju Ji-hoon	Mask
2015	Kim Tae-hee	Yong-pal
2015	Yoo Ah-in	Six Flying Dragons
2015	Moon Geun-young	The Village: Achiara's Secret
2015	Cho Jae-hyun	Punch
2015	Shin Se-kyung	A Girl Who Sees Smells, Six Flying Dragons
2015	Ji Jin-hee	I Have a Lover
2015	Park Yoochun	A Girl Who Sees Smells
2016	Kim Sung-ryung	Mrs. Cop 2
2016	Namkoong Min	Beautiful Gong Shim
2016	Park Shin-hye	Doctors
2016	Lee Joon-gi	Moon Lovers: Scarlet Heart Ryeo
2016	Jo Jung-suk	Don't Dare to Dream
2016	Lee Min-ho	Legend of the Blue Sea
2016	Jun Ji-hyun	Legend of the Blue Sea
2016	Seo Hyun-jin	Romantic Doctor, Teacher Kim
2016	Han Suk-kyu	Romantic Doctor, Teacher Kim

== Big Star Award ==
Year	Winner	Drama
2000	Cha Tae-hyun	Juliet's Man
2000	Choi Min-soo	Legends of Love
2000	Go Doo-shim	Virtue
2000	Go Hyun-jung	
2000	Kim Hee-sun	Tomato
2000	Kim Min-jong	Ghost
2000	Kim Sang-joong	Legends of Love, SWAT Police
2000	Kim Young-ae	Cheers for Women
2000	Lee Byung-hun	Happy Together, Love Story: Sunflower
2000	Lee Seung-yeon	Legends of Love, Medical Center
2000	Lee Young-ae	Fireworks
2000	Park Yeong-gyu	Virtue
2000	Shim Eun-ha	Trap of Youth
2000	Song Yun-ah	Love Story: Lost Baggage

== Newcomer Awards ==
=== Best New Actor ===
Year	Winner	Drama
1996	Jung Heung-chae	Im Kkeokjeong
1998	Kim Suk-hoon	Letters Written on a Cloudy Day
1998	Ryu Jin	
2000	Jang Hyuk	Wang Rung's Land
2000	So Ji-sub	Love Story: Miss Hip-hop and Mr. Rock, Wang Rung's Land, Cheers for Women
2017	Yang Se-jong	Temperature of Love
2018	Ahn Hyo-seop	Still 17
2019	Eum Moon-suk	The Fiery Priest
2020	Jo Byung-gyu	Hot Stove League
2021	Kim Young-dae	The Penthouse: War in Life 2 and 3
2021	Choi Hyun-wook	Racket Boys
2021	Son Sang-yeon	Racket Boys
2022	Bae In-hyuk	Cheer Up and Why Her
2022	Kim Hyun-jin	Cheer Up
2022	Ryeoun	Through the Darkness
2023	Kim Do-hoon	The Escape of the Seven
2023	Kang Yoo-seok	Payback
2023	Lee Shin-young	Dr. Romantic 3
2023	Lee Hong-nae	Dr. Romantic 3

=== Best New Actress ===
Year	Winner	Drama
1995	Hwang Soo-jung	Thaw
1996	Im Sang-ah	Flames of Ambition
1998	Lee Tae-ran	Soonpoong Clinic
1998	Kim Hyun-joo	I Love You, I Love You
1999	Kang Sung-yeon	Happy Together
2000	Hwang In-young	SWAT Police
2000	Kim Min-hee	Juliet's Man
2000	Kim Yoo-mi	SWAT Police, Wrath of an Angel
2017	Kim Da-som	Band of Sisters
2018	Lee Yoo-young	Your Honor
2019	Go Min-si	Secret Boutique
2019	Keum Sae-rok	The Fiery Priest
2020	So Joo-yeon	Dr. Romantic 2
2021	Choi Ye-bin	The Penthouse: War in Life 2 and 3
2021	Han Ji-hyun	The Penthouse: War in Life 2 and 3
2021	Roh Jeong-eui	Our Beloved Summer
2022	Jang Gyuri	Cheer Up
2022	Lee Eun-saem	Cheer Up
2022	Gong Sung-ha	Through the Darkness
2023	Kwon Ah-reum	The Killing Vote
2023	Yang Hye-ji	Revenant
2023	Jung Soo-bin	Trolley

=== New Star Award ===
Year	Winner	Drama
2001	Go Soo	Piano
2001	Gong Hyo-jin	Wonderful Days
2001	Ji Sung	Wonderful Days
2001	Zo In-sung	Piano
2001	Lee Yoo-jin	Beautiful Days
2001	Park Jung-chul	Legend
2001	Ryoo Seung-bum	Wonderful Days
2002	Han Eun-jung	Successful Story of a Bright Girl
2002	Kim Jaewon	Rival
2002	Kim Jung-hwa	Glass Slippers
2002	Kim Min-jung	Rival
2002	Kwon Sang-woo	We Are Dating Now
2002	Lee Yo-won	Great Ambition
2002	Park Sol-mi	Bad Girls
2002	Ryu Soo-young	Successful Story of a Bright Girl
2002	Sung Yu-ri	Bad Girls
2003	Choi Jung-won	Long Live Love
2003	Gong Yoo	Screen
2003	Jo Hyun-jae	First Love
2003	Kim Nam-jin	Thousand Years of Love
2003	Kim Tae-hee	Stairway to Heaven
2003	Lee Dong-wook	Land of Wine
2003	Park Han-byul	My Fair Lady
2003	Shin Min-a	Punch
2003	So Yi-hyun	Punch
2003	Yoo Min	A Problem at My Younger Brother's House
2004	Eugene	Save the Last Dance for Me
2004	Jeong Da-bin	My 19 Year Old Sister-in-Law
2004	Jo An	The Land
2004	Kim Sung-soo	Stained Glass
2004	Yoo Sun	Little Women
2005	Chun Jung-myung	Fashion 70's
2005	Hyun Young	Fashion 70's
2005	Cho Yeon-woo	Dear Heaven, Bad Housewife
2005	Lee Bo-young	Ballad of Seodong
2005	Lee Jae-hwang	That Summer's Typhoon, Tears of Diamond
2005	Lee Kyu-han	Love Needs a Miracle
2005	Lee Tae-gon	Dear Heaven
2005	Yoon Jung-hee	Dear Heaven
2005	Yoon Se-ah	Lovers in Prague
2006	Go Ara	Snow Flower
2006	Kang Ji-sub	Common Single
2006	Claudia Kim	Queen of the Game
2006	Lee Ha-na	Alone in Love
2006	Lee Jin-wook	Alone in Love
2006	Park Si-yeon	My Girl
2006	Yoon Ji-min	Invincible Parachute Agent
2006	Yoon Sang-hyun	Common Single
2007	Choi Yeo-jin	Surgeon Bong Dal-hee
2007	Ku Hye-sun	The King and I
2007	Lee Ji-hyun	A Good Day to Love
2007	Lee Young-eun	War of Money
2007	Park Si-hoo	How to Meet a Perfect Neighbor
2007	Ryu Tae-joon	
2007	Shin Dong-wook	War of Money
2007	Song Jong-ho	Surgeon Bong Dal-hee
2007	Wang Bit-na	
2008	Bae Soo-bin	Painter of the Wind
2008	Cha Ye-ryun	Working Mom
2008	Chae Young-in	Temptation of Wife
2008	Ha Seok-jin	I Am Happy
2008	Han Hyo-joo	Iljimae
2008	Im Jung-eun	Aquarius
2008	Ji Hyun-woo	My Sweet Seoul
2008	Lee Joon-hyuk	First Wives' Club
2008	Lee Sang-woo	First Wives' Club
2008	Moon Chae-won	Painter of the Wind
2008	Yoon So-yi	Glass Castle
2009	Jin Tae-hyun	Temptation of an Angel
2009	Jung Gyu-woon	Loving You a Thousand Times
2009	Jung Yong-hwa	You're Beautiful
2009	Kim Bum	Dream
2009	Lee Hong-gi	You're Beautiful
2009	Lee Min-jung	Smile, You
2009	Lee So-yeon	Temptation of an Angel
2009	Lee Tae-im	Don't Hesitate
2009	Lee Yong-woo	Style
2009	Oh Young-shil	Temptation of Wife
2009	Park Shin-hye	You're Beautiful
2009	Son Dam-bi	Dream
2010	Choi Siwon	Oh! My Lady
2010	Hahm Eun-jung	Coffee House
2010	Han Chae-ah	Definitely Neighbors
2010	Hwang Jung-eum	Giant
2010	Joo Sang-wook	Giant
2010	Kim Soo-hyun	Giant
2010	Nam Gyu-ri	Life Is Beautiful
2010	No Min-woo	My Girlfriend Is a Nine-Tailed Fox
2011	Goo Hara	City Hunter
2011	Im Soo-hyang	New Tales of Gisaeng
2011	Ji Chang-wook	Warrior Baek Dong-soo
2011	Jin Se-yeon	My Daughter the Flower
2011	Jeong Yu-mi	A Thousand Days' Promise
2011	Kim Jaejoong	Protect the Boss
2011	Lee Jae-yoon	My Love By My Side
2011	Seo Hyo-rim	Scent of a Woman
2011	Shin Hyun-bin	Warrior Baek Dong-soo
2011	Sung Hoon	New Tales of Gisaeng
2011	Wang Ji-hye	Protect the Boss
2012	Choi Minho	To the Beautiful You
2012	Go Joon-hee	The Chaser
2012	Jung Eun-woo	Five Fingers
2012	Kwon Yuri	Fashion King
2012	Lee Hyun-woo	To the Beautiful You
2012	Lee Jong-hyun	A Gentleman's Dignity
2012	Park Hyo-joo	The Chaser
2012	Park Se-young	Faith
2012	Sulli	To the Beautiful You
2012	Yoon Jin-yi	A Gentleman's Dignity
2013	Choi Jin-hyuk	The Heirs
2013	Lim Ju-hwan	Ugly Alert
2013	Jung Eun-ji	That Winter, the Wind Blows
2013	Kang Min-hyuk	The Heirs
2013	Kang So-ra	Ugly Alert
2013	Kim Ji-won	The Heirs
2013	Kim So-hyun	The Suspicious Housekeeper
2013	Kim Yoo-ri	Cheongdam-dong Alice, Master's Sun
2013	Lee Da-hee	I Can Hear Your Voice
2013	Seo In-guk	Master's Sun
2014	Ahn Jae-hyun	My Love from the Star
2014	Han Groo	One Warm Word
2014	Han Sunhwa	God's Gift: 14 Days
2014	Kang Ha-neul	Angel Eyes
2014	Kim You-jung	Secret Door
2014	Kim Young-kwang	Pinocchio
2014	Lee Yu-bi	Pinocchio
2014	Nam Bo-ra	Only Love
2014	Park Seo-joon	One Warm Word
2014	Seo Ha-joon	Only Love
2015	Son Ho-jun	Mrs. Cop
2015	Gong Seung-yeon	Heard It Through the Grapevine, Six Flying Dragons
2015	Go Ah-sung	Heard It Through the Grapevine
2015	Yoon Kyun-sang	The Time We Were Not in Love, Six Flying Dragons
2015	Byun Yo-han	Six Flying Dragons
2015	Lee Yeol-eum	The Village: Achiara's Secret, Divorce Lawyer in Love
2015	Lee Elijah	The Return of Hwang Geum-bok
2015	Park Hyung-sik	High Society
2015	Yook Sungjae	The Village: Achiara's Secret
2015	Lim Ji-yeon	High Society
2016	Go Kyung-pyo	Don't Dare to Dream
2016	Lee Hye-ri	Entertainer
2016	Bang Min-ah	Beautiful Gong Shim
2016	Kim Min-seok	Doctors
2016	Moon Ji-in	Doctors
2016	Byun Baek-hyun	Moon Lovers: Scarlet Heart Ryeo
2016	Kim Min-jae	Romantic Doctor, Teacher Kim
2016	Kwak Si-yang	The Second Last Love
2016	Jung Hae-in	Yes, That's How It Is

== Youth Awards ==
=== Best Young Actor ===
Year	Winner	Drama
1996	Jung Soo-beom	The Brothers' River
1996	Ahn Sung-tae	The Brothers' River
1996	Yook Dong-il	The Brothers' River
1998	Kim Sung-min	Soonpoong Clinic
2000	Lee Jung-yoon	Virtue
2001	Kwon Oh-min	
2001	Oh Seung-yoon	
2002	Kwak Jung-wook	Rustic Period
2003	Park Ji-bin	Perfect Love
2004	Kim Young-chan	Lovers in Paris
2006	Kim Ji-han	
2007	Yoo Seung-ho	The King and I
2007	Joo Min-soo	The King and I Surgeon Bong Dal-hee
2008	Yeo Jin-goo	Iljimae
2009	Jung Yun-seok	Temptation of Wife
2019	Yoon Chan-young	Doctor John; Everything and Nothing
2020	Ahn Ji-ho	Nobody Knows
2021	Tang Jun-sang	Racket Boys
2022	Lee Eugene	Why Her
2023	Choi Hyun-jin	The Killing Vote
2023	Han Ji-an	Dr. Romantic 3

=== Best Young Actress ===
Year	Winner	Drama
1996	Kwak Se-ryun	The Brothers' River
1996	Kwon Hae-gwan	The Brothers' River
1998	Kim Sung-eun	Soonpoong Clinic
2000	Shin Ji-soo	Virtue
2001	Eun Seo-woo	
2002	Kim Soo-min	Affection
2003	Kim Won-mi	Perfect Love
2003	Park Shin-hye	Stairway to Heaven
2004	Bae Na-yeon	The Land
2005	Byun Joo-yeon	Fashion 70's
2005	Lee Young-yoo	Bad Housewife
2006	Nam Ji-hyun	My Love
2007	Park Bo-young	The King and I
2008	Kim You-jung	Painter of the Wind
2009	Kim Su-jung	Two Wives
2017	Kim Ji-min	Super Family
2018	Park Si-eun	Still 17
2020	Kim Hyun-soo	The Penthouse: War in Life 1
2021	Lee Jae-in	Racket Boys
2022	Kim Min-seo	The First Responders
2023	Park So-yi	Revenant
2023	Ahn Chae-heum	Taxi Driver 2

== Popularity Awards ==
=== Netizen Popularity Award ===
Year	Winner	Drama
1996	Jung Chan	August Bride
1996	Kim Ji-ho	August Bride
1996	Kim Won-hee	
1996	Lee Young-beom	LA Arirang
1998	Kim Nam-joo	Steal My Heart
1998	Kim So-yeon	Soonpoong Clinic, Winners, I Love You, I Love You
1998	Song Seung-heon	Winners
1999	Cha Tae-hyun	Happy Together
1999	Jun Ji-hyun	Happy Together
1999	Jung Woong-in	Eun-shil, Waves
2000	Cha Tae-hyun	Juliet's Man
2000	Chae Rim	Cheers for Women
2001	Go Soo	Piano
2001	Kim Ha-neul	Piano
2001	Park Sun-young	Wonderful Days
2001	Yoon Da-hoon	Guardian Angel
2002	Zo In-sung	Shoot for the Stars
2002	Kim Jaewon	Rival
2002	Kim Min-hee	Age of Innocence
2002	So Yoo-jin	Rival
2004	Kim Rae-won	Love Story in Harvard
2004	Kim Tae-hee	Love Story in Harvard
2005	Zo In-sung	Spring Day
2005	Kim Hyun-joo	The Land
2006	Lee Seo-jin	Lovers
2006	Park Jin-hee	Please Come Back, Soon-ae
2007	Park Shin-yang	War of Money
2007	Lee Yo-won	Surgeon Bong Dal-hee
2008	Lee Joon-gi	Iljimae
2009	Jang Keun-suk	You're Beautiful
2010	Hyun Bin	Secret Garden
2010	Ha Ji-won	Secret Garden
2011	Lee Min-ho	City Hunter
2011	Choi Kang-hee	Protect the Boss
2012	Park Yoochun	Rooftop Prince
2012	Kim Ha-neul	A Gentleman's Dignity
2013	Lee Min-ho	The Heirs
2014	Kim Soo-hyun	My Love from the Star
2015	Kim Hyun-joo	I Have a Lover

=== SBSi Award ===
Year	Winner	Drama
2000	Cha Tae-hyun	Juliet's Man
2000	Kim Hee-sun	Tomato
2001	Lee Byung-hun	Beautiful Days
2001	Song Hye-kyo	Guardian Angel
2002	Kim Jaewon	Romance
2002	Kim Hyun-joo	Glass Slippers
2003	Kwon Sang-woo	Stairway to Heaven
2003	Kim Hee-ae	Perfect Love

=== Best Couple Award ===
Year	Winner	Drama
2007	Kim Byung-se and Ha Yoo-mi	My Husband's Woman
2007	Lee Beom-soo and Lee Yo-won	Surgeon Bong Dal-hee
2008	Moon Chae-won and Moon Geun-young	Painter of the Wind
2009	Lee Seung-gi and Han Hyo-joo	Brilliant Legacy
2010	Hyun Bin and Ha Ji-won	Secret Garden
2010	Joo Sang-wook and Hwang Jung-eum	Giant
2010	Lee Seung-gi and Shin Min-a	My Girlfriend Is a Nine-Tailed Fox
2011	Ji Sung and Choi Kang-hee	Protect the Boss
2012	Kim Min-jong and Yoon Jin-yi	A Gentleman's Dignity
2012	Park Yoochun and Han Ji-min	Rooftop Prince
2013	Lee Min-ho and Park Shin-hye	The Heirs
2014	Zo In-sung and Gong Hyo-jin	It's Okay, That's Love
2014	Joo Sang-wook and Han Ye-seul	Birth of a Beauty
2014	Kim Soo-hyun and Jun Ji-hyun	My Love from the Star
2014	Lee Jong-suk and Park Shin-hye	Pinocchio
2015	Joo Won and Kim Tae-hee	Yong-pal
2015	Yoo Ah-in and Shin Se-kyung	Six Flying Dragons
2015	Ji Jin-hee and Kim Hyun-joo	I Have a Lover
2016	Yoo Yeon-seok and Seo Hyun-jin	Romantic Doctor, Teacher Kim
2016	Lee Joon-gi and Lee Ji-eun	Moon Lovers: Scarlet Heart Ryeo
2016	Lee Min-ho and Jun Ji-hyun	Legend of the Blue Sea
2017	Lee Jong-suk and Bae Suzy	While You Were Sleeping
2018	Kam Woo-sung and Kim Sun-ah	Should We Kiss First?
2019	Lee Seung-gi and Bae Suzy	Vagabond
2020	Kim Min-jae and Park Eun-bin	Do You Like Brahms?
2021	Ahn Hyo-seop and Kim You-jung	Lovers of the Red Sky
2022	Ahn Hyo-seop and Kim Se-jeong	Business Proposal
2022	Kim Min-kyu and Seol In-ah	Business Proposal
2023	Song Kang and Kim You-jung	My Demon
2024	Park Shin-hye and Kim Jae-young	The Judge from Hell
2025	Ahn Eun-jin and Jang Ki-yong	Dynamite Kiss

== Sitcom ==
Year	Category	Winner	Drama
1998	Excellence Award, Actor in a Sitcom	Park Yeong-gyu	Soonpoong Clinic
1998	Best New Actor in a Sitcom	Choi Chang-min	How Am I
1998	Best New Actress in a Sitcom	Song Hye-kyo	How Am I
1999	Grand Prize (Daesang) in a Sitcom	Oh Ji-myeong	Soonpoong Clinic
2000	Grand Prize (Daesang) in a Sitcom	Park Yeong-gyu	Soonpoong Clinic
2000	Excellence Award, Actor in a Sitcom	Lee Young-beom	Golbangi
2000	Excellence Award, Actress in a Sitcom	Kim Jung-eun	March
2000	Best New Actor in a Sitcom	Jung So-young	
2000	Best New Actress in a Sitcom	Kim Hyo-jin	Golbangi
2000	Popularity Award in a Sitcom	Pyo In-bong	Soonpoong Clinic
2000	Popularity Award in a Sitcom	Um Aing-ran	March
2002	Excellence Award, Actor in a Sitcom	Kim Byung-se	Dae Bak Family
2002	Excellence Award, Actor in a Sitcom	Choi Sung-kook	Dae Bak Family
2002	Excellence Award, Actress in a Sitcom	Jo Mi-ryung	Dae Bak Family
2002	Excellence Award, Actress in a Sitcom	Lee Yoo-jin	Girls' High School Days
2003	Excellence Award, Actor in a Sitcom	Park Jun-gyu	Apgujeong House
2003	Excellence Award, Actress in a Sitcom	Hong Ri-na	Honest Living
2004	Excellence Award, Actor in a Sitcom	Baek Yoon-sik	Apgujeong House
2004	Excellence Award, Actress in a Sitcom	Byun Jung-soo	You're Not Alone

== Variety ==
Year	Category	Winner	Program
1998	Best MC	Seo Se-won	Making a Better World
1998	Best MC	Lee So-ra	TV Entertainment Tonight
2001	Special Award for TV MC	Han Seon-gyo	Good Morning
2001	Special Award for TV MC	Jung Eun-ah	Good Morning
2001	Special Award for TV MC	Jang Jung-jin	Inkigayo
2002	Special Award for TV MC	Lee Kyung-shil, Shin Dong-yup	
2003	Special Award for TV MC	Kang Ho-dong	Beautiful Sunday
2003	Special Award for TV MC	Kim Je-dong	Ya Shim Man Man
2004	Special Award for TV MC	Yoo Jae-suk	
2005	Special Award for TV MC	Kang Ho-dong	Ya Shim Man Man

== Radio ==
Year	Category	Winner	Program
2002	Special Award in Radio	Park Chul	
2003	Top Excellence Award in Radio	Lee Sook-young	SBS Power FM
2003	Excellence Award in Radio	Kim Hak-do	Wawa Show
2003	Excellence Award in Radio	Jeon Young-mi	Wawa Show
2003	Excellence Award in Radio	Bae Chil-soo	Wawa Show
2004	Special Award in Radio	Kim Heung-gook	Korean Special Show (SBS Love FM)
2004	Special Award in Radio	Park Mi-sun	Korean Special Show (SBS Love FM)
2004	Special Award in Radio	Park So-hyun	Love Game (SBS Power FM)
2005	Special Award in Radio	Seo Min-jung	Our Joyful Young Days

== Friendship Award ==
Year	Winner	Drama
1996	Nam Po-dong	The Brothers' River
2000	Son Hyun-joo	The Thief's Daughter
2001	Kim Yong-heon	
2002	Lee Kyeong-ho	
2003	Ra Jae-woong	탤랜트실장
2004	Ok Seung-il	
2005	Kim Dong-kyun	
2006	Kim Myung-jin	
2007	Yoo Jung-woo	Get Karl! Oh Soo-jung
2008	Do Ki-seok	Iljimae

== Other Awards ==
Year	Category	Winner	Drama
1998	Best Writer	Heo Sook	Mom's Daughter
1998	Special Award	LA Arirang team	
2002	Special Award for PD	Jang Hyung-il	
2006	Achievement in Production	Lee Ho-yeon (DSP Entertainment)	Yeon Gaesomun, My Girl
2007	Achievement in Production	Shin Hyun-tak (Samhwa Networks)	
2008	Achievement in Production	Go Dae-hwa	
2010	Human Drama Award	—N/a	Definitely Neighbors
2010	Frontier Drama Award	—N/a	Dr. Champ
2010	Most Popular Drama	—N/a	Secret Garden
2010	Drama of the Year	—N/a	Giant
2016	Hallyu Star Award	Lee Joon-gi	Moon Lovers: Scarlet Heart Ryeo
2017	Drama of the Year	—N/a	Innocent Defendant
2017	Character of the Year	Um Ki-joon	Innocent Defendant
2018	Best Picture	—N/a	Where Stars Land
2018	Best Character	Shin Sung-rok, Bong Tae-gyu, Park Ki-woong, Yoon Jong-hoon	Return
2019	Hallyu Contents Award	—N/a	Vagabond
2019	Wavve Award	—N/a	The Fiery Priest
2019	Best Supporting Team	—N/a	The Fiery Priest
2019	Best Character Award, Actor	Jung Moon-sung	Haechi
2019	Best Character Award, Actress	Pyo Ye-jin	VIP
2020	Best Supporting Team	—N/a	Hot Stove League
2020	Best Character Award, Actor	Oh Jung-se	Hot Stove League
2020	Best Character Award, Actress	Choi Kang-hee	Good Casting
2021	Best Supporting Team	Kim Min-ki, Lee Ji-won, Jung Min-seong, Kim Kang-hoon, Cha Mi-kyung and Shin Cheol-jin	Racket Boys
2021	Best Character Award, Actor	Kwak Si-yang	Lovers of the Red Sky
2021	Best Character Award, Actress	Oh Na-ra	Racket Boys
2021	Scene Stealer Award	Shim So-young	Taxi Driver
2021	Lifetime Achievement Award	Kim Soon-ok	The Penthouse: War in Life 1, 2 and 3
2022	Best Supporting Team	Bae In-hyuk, Han Ji-hyun, Jang Gyu-ri, Kim Hyun-jin, Ryu Hyun-kyung, Yang Dong-geun, Kim Shin-bi, Lee Eun-saem, Lee Jung-jun, Han Soo-ah and Hyun Woo-seok	Cheer Up
2022	Best Performance	Lee Chung-ah	One Dollar Lawyer
2022	Scene Stealer Award	Im Chul-soo	Today's Webtoon
2022	Scene Stealer Award	Kim Ja-Young	One Dollar Lawyer
2022	Scene Stealer Award	Nam Mi-jung	Woori the Virgin

== Achievement Award ==
Year	Winner	Drama
1996	Jang Min-ho	
1998	Oh Ji-myeong	Soonpoong Clinic
2000	Lee Soon-jae	I Want to Keep Seeing You, The Aspen Tree
2001	Shin Goo	Why Can't We Stop Them
2002	Im Dong-jin	Dae Bak Family
2003	Park Won-sook	Miss Kim's Million Dollar Quest, My 19 Year Old Sister-in-Law
2004	Im Hyun-sik	Little Women
2005	Kim Mu-saeng	
2006	Lee Kyeong-ho	
2007	Shin Goo	The King and I
2008	Moon Young-nam	First Wives' Club
2009	Ban Hyo-jung	Brilliant Legacy
2010	Park Geun-hyung	Big Thing
2011	Kim Young-ok	Protect the Boss
2012	Kim Eun-sook	A Gentleman's Dignity
2013	Kim Soo-mi	Incarnation of Money
2014	Kim Ja-ok	
2015	Lee Deok-hwa	
2016	Jang Yong	Our Gap-soon

== Hosts ==
No.	Year	Hosts
1	1993	
2	1994	
3	1995	
4	1996	
5	1997	—N/a
6	1998	
7	1999	
8	2000	
9	2001	
10	2002	Yoo Jung-hyun, Song Yun-ah
11	2003	Yoo Jung-hyun, Song Yun-ah
12	2004	Park Soo-hong, Lee Hyori
13	2005	Park Sang-won and Kim Hyun-joo
14	2006	Yoo Jung-hyun, Lee Hoon and Lee Da-hae
15	2007	Kim Yong-man, Ha Hee-ra and Ku Hye-sun
16	2008	Ryu Si-won and Han Ye-seul
17	2009	Jang Keun-suk, Moon Geun-young and Park Sun-young
18	2010	Lee Beom-soo, Park Jin-hee and Lee Soo-kyung
19	2011	Ji Sung and Choi Kang-hee
20	2012	Lee Dong-wook and Jung Ryeo-won
21	2013	Lee Hwi-jae Lee Bo-young and Kim Woo-bin
22	2014	Lee Hwi-jae, Park Shin-hye and Park Seo-joon
23	2015	Lee Hwi-jae, Lim Ji-yeon and Yoo Jun-sang
24	2016	Lee Hwi-jae, Jang Keun-suk and Bang Min-ah
25	2017	Shin Dong-yup and Lee Bo-young
26	2018	Shin Dong-yup, Shin Hye-sun and Lee Je-hoon
27	2019	Shin Dong-yup and Jang Na-ra
28	2020	Shin Dong-yup and Kim You-jung
29	2021	Shin Dong-yup and Kim You-jung
30	2022	Shin Dong-yup, Ahn Hyo-seop and Kim Se-jeong
31	2023	Shin Dong-yup and Kim You-jung
32	2024	Shin Dong-yup, Kim Hye-yoon and Kim Ji-yeon

== Records ==
- Most Daesang wins:
  - Park Shin-yang (2) – Lovers in Paris (2004), War of Money (2007)
  - Han Suk-kyu (2) – Deep Rooted Tree (2011), Romantic Doctor, Teacher Kim (2016)
  - Kim Nam-gil (2) – The Fiery Priest (2019), Through the Darkness (2022)
- Youngest Daesang winner: Moon Geun-young (Age: 21) – Painter of the Wind (2008)

== See also ==
- List of Asian television awards
- KBS Drama Awards
- MBC Drama Awards
