= 2019 SBS Drama Awards =

27th edition of award ceremony

- Date: December 31, 2019
- Site: SBS Prism Tower, Sangam-dong, Mapo-gu, Seoul
- Hosted by: Shin Dong-yup; Jang Na-ra

Television coverage
- Network: SBS
- Duration: 260 minutes

The 2019 SBS Drama Awards, presented by Seoul Broadcasting System (SBS), took place on December 31, 2019 at SBS Prism Tower, Sangam-dong, Mapo-gu, Seoul. It was hosted by Shin Dong-yup and Jang Na-ra.

== Winners and nominees ==
(Winners denoted in bold)

Grand Prize (Daesang)
**Kim Nam-gil** – **The Fiery Priest**
Producer Award	Hallyu Contents Award
**Jang Na-ra** – **VIP**; Bae Suzy – Vagabond; Han Ye-ri – Nokdu Flower; Ji Sung – Doctor John; Jo Jung-suk – Nokdu Flower; Jung Il-woo – Haechi; Kim Nam-gil – The Fiery Priest; Kim Sun-a – Secret Boutique; Lee Hanee – The Fiery Priest; Lee Seung-gi – Vagabond	**Vagabond**
Top Excellence Award, Actor in a Miniseries	Top Excellence Award, Actress in a Miniseries
**Lee Seung-gi** – **Vagabond**; Kim Young-kwang – The Secret Life of My Secretary; Yoo Seung-ho – My Strange Hero; Joo Jin-mo – Big Issue; Ji Sung – Doctor John	**Bae Suzy** – **Vagabond**; Kim Sun-a – Secret Boutique; Park Jin-hee – Doctor Detective; Jang Na-ra – VIP
Top Excellence Award, Actor in a Mid-Length Drama	Top Excellence Award, Actress in a Mid-Length Drama
**Jo Jung-suk** – **Nokdu Flower**; Kim Nam-gil – The Fiery Priest; Yeo Jin-goo – My Absolute Boyfriend; Jung Il-woo – Haechi; Joo Sang-wook – Fates & Furies	**Lee Hanee** – **The Fiery Priest**; Go Ara – Haechi; Bang Min-ah – My Absolute Boyfriend; Lee Min-jung – Fates & Furies
Top Excellence Award, Actor in a Serial Drama	Top Excellence Award, Actress in a Serial Drama
**Seo Do-young** – **Gangnam Scandal** and **Want a Taste?**; Park Jin-woo – Shady Mom-in-Law; Seo Ha-joon – Want a Taste?; Son Woo-hyuk – Shady Mom-in-Law	**Shim Yi-young** – **Want a Taste?**; Kim Hye-sun – Shady Mom-in-Law; Shin Go-eun – Gangnam Scandal; Shin Da-eun – Shady Mom-in-Law
Excellence Award, Actor in a Miniseries	Excellence Award, Actress in a Miniseries
**Lee Sang-yoon** – **VIP**; Kwak Dong-yeon – My Strange Hero; Shin Sung-rok – Vagabond; Lee Kyu-hyung – Doctor John; Lee Ki-woo – Doctor Detective	**Lee Se-young** – **Doctor John**; Park Ji-young – Doctor Detective; Jo Bo-ah – My Strange Hero; Jin Ki-joo – The Secret Life of My Secretary
Excellence Award, Actor in a Mid-Length Drama	Excellence Award, Actress in a Mid-Length Drama
**Kim Sung-kyun** – **The Fiery Priest**; Kwon Yul – Haechi; Yoon Shi-yoon – Nokdu Flower; Choi Moo-sung – Nokdu Flower	**Han Ye-ri** – **Nokdu Flower**; Bae Jeong-hwa – Haechi; Baek Ji-won – The Fiery Priest; So Yi-hyun – Fates & Furies
Best Supporting Actor	Best Supporting Actress
**Go Jun** – **The Fiery Priest**; Park Hoon – Haechi; Baek Yoon-sik – Vagabond; Lee Geung-young – Vagabond	**Lee Chung-ah** – **VIP**; **Moon Jeong-hee** – **Vagabond**; Kim Jae-kyung – The Secret Life of My Secretary; Park Hee-von – Secret Boutique
Best Character Award, Actor	Best Character Award, Actress
**Jung Moon-sung** – **Haechi**; Kim Min-jae – The Fiery Priest; Ahn Chang-hwan – The Fiery Priest; Jang Hyuk-jin – VIP	**Pyo Ye-jin** – **VIP**; Kim Yeo-jin – My Strange Hero; Chang Mi-hee – Secret Boutique; Hwang Bo-ra – Vagabond
Best Supporting Team	Best Couple Award
**The Fiery Priest**; Vagabond; VIP; Nokdu Flower	**Lee Seung-gi** and **Bae Suzy** – **Vagabond**; Jung Il-woo and Go Ara – Haechi; Jo Jung-suk and Han Ye-ri – Nokdu Flower; Ji Sung and Lee Se-young – Doctor John
Wavve Award	Youth Acting Award
**The Fiery Priest**	**Yoon Chan-young** – **Doctor John** and **Everything and Nothing**; Moon Woo-jin – Vagabond; Lee Han-seo – Shady Mom-in-Law; Chae Yu-ri – Doctor Detective; Choi Dong-hwa – Secret Boutique
Best New Actor	Best New Actress
**Eum Moon-suk** – **The Fiery Priest**; Kim Jae-young – Secret Boutique; Shin Jae-ha – VIP; Jung Kang-hee – Doctor Detective; Hwang Hee – Doctor John	**Go Min-si** – **Secret Boutique**; **Keum Sae-rok** – **The Fiery Priest**; Kwak Sun-young – VIP; Park Ah-in – Vagabond; Su Bin – Shady Mom-in-Law

== Presenters ==
Order	Presenter	Award
1	Ahn Hyo-seop, Lee Sung-kyung	Best New Actor/Actress
2	Mamamoo	Wavve Award
3	Park Si-eun	Youth Acting Award
4	Im Won-hee, Ye Ji-won	Best Supporting Actor/Actress
5	Jo Jung-suk	Best Supporting Team
6	Kim Min-jae, So Joo-yeon	Best Couple Award
7	Park Ki-woong	Best Character Actor/Actress
8	Yang Se-jong, Cho Yu-jeong	Excellence Award in Miniseries Actor/Actress
9	Kwak Si-yang, Lee Da-in	Excellence Award in Mid-Length Drama Actor/Actress
10	Kim Soo-jeong	Hallyu Contents Award
11	Ryu Deok-hwan, Kim Seo-hyung	Top Excellence Award in Long Drama Actor/Actress
12	Lee Je-hoon	Top Excellence Award in Miniseries Actor/Actress
13	Namkoong Min, Park Eun-bin	Top Excellence Award in Mid-Length Drama Actor/Actress
14	Lee Geung-young	Producer Award
15	Han Jung-Hwan, Kim Sun-ah	Grand Prize (Daesang)

== Special performances ==
Order	Artist	Performed
1	Mamamoo	"HIP"
2	Eum Moon-suk	"Swing Baby"

== See also ==
- 2019 KBS Drama Awards
- 2019 MBC Drama Awards
