= Kim Sun-a =

South Korean actress (born 1973)

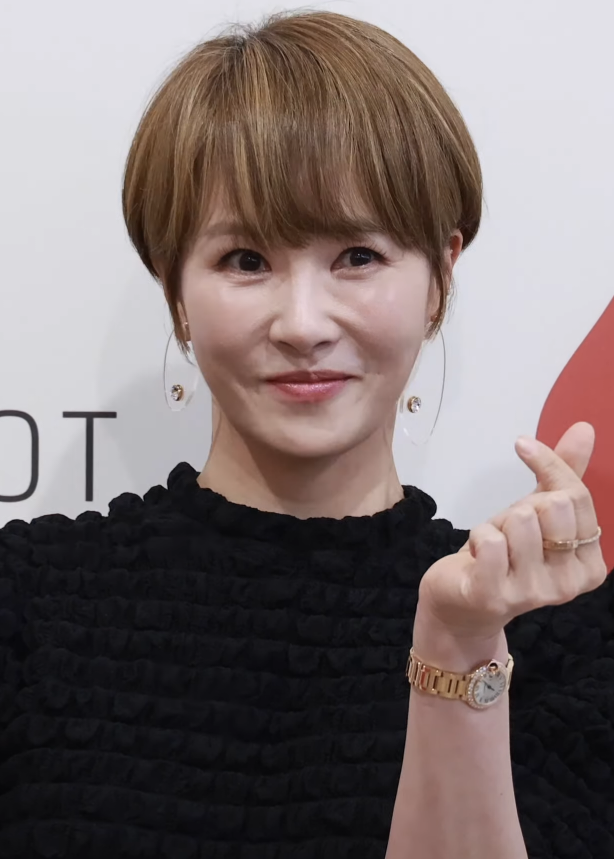
- Kim in July 2024
- Born: 1 October 1973 (age 53); Daegu, South Korea
- Education: Ball State University - Piano Major; Kyung Hee University - Theater and Film
- Occupation: Actress
- Years active: 1996–present
- Agent: Y1 Entertainment

Korean name
- Hangul: 김선아
- Hanja: 金宣兒
- RR: Gim Seona
- MR: Kim Sŏna

Kim Sun-a (Korean: 김선아; born October 1, 1973) is a South Korean actress. She is best known for her title role as Kim Sam-soon in the popular television series My Lovely Sam Soon (2005). Other notable series include City Hall (2009), Scent of a Woman (2011),The Lady in Dignity (2017), Should We Kiss First? (2018), Children of Nobody (2018) and Secret Boutique (2019).

== Early life ==
Kim Sun-a was born in Jung-gu, Daegu, South Korea in 1973. She is the eldest of three siblings, with a younger brother and sister. When Kim was in middle school, her family immigrated to Japan, and she spent much of her adolescence in Chōfu, Tokyo, where she learned to speak Japanese fluently.

In 1993, Kim enrolled at Ball State University in Indiana, United States as a Piano major (she also became fluent in English).

== Career ==
While in South Korea for summer vacation in 1996, Kim stood in for a friend in a modeling job, thus inadvertently making her entertainment debut. Despite her inexperience in show business, she left college and subsequently appeared in a Hanbul Cosmetics commercial with the slogan "I felt his scent on a strange woman," which jump-started her career. She then appeared in a music video by Kim Hyun-cheol, and in 1997 began getting cast in supporting roles on TV but did not emerge as a star. Kim would first become well known as a film actress, debuting in the big-budget box office failure Yesterday, but going on to play a lead role as a student teacher in the unexpected hit Wet Dreams. Initially Kim had considered a singing career and successfully auditioned to join Park Joon-hyung and Park Jin-young's project mixed-gender group "GOT6" in 1997 but left the following year to pursue acting. The group then became the five-piece boy band g.o.d. Kim's identity as an original member was only revealed by Park Joon-hyung and confirmed by Kim herself in 2015.

Following her film success, Kim began to establish a niche for herself in comedies, often appearing as a straight-talking and not particularly demure comic heroine. She appeared in three films in 2003: a memorable cameo appearance in the period comedy Once Upon a Time in a Battlefield, opposite Im Chang-jung in the commercially successful The Greatest Expectation, and together with Cha Tae-hyun in the little-watched Happy Ero Christmas. In 2004 she took the lead role in S Diary as a jilted woman who decides to get revenge on her ex-boyfriends.

The early part of 2005 saw her star in the action-comedy She's on Duty, but she would follow up by returning to the realm of TV dramas. It proved to be the best move of her career, as My Lovely Sam Soon ended up becoming the most-watched drama of 2005. The forthright, independent personality she displayed in her leading role as a woman who finds unexpected success in life as a baker endeared her to women across Korea, and later Asia, establishing her as a top star. Later that year, Kim decided to finish her college degree by transferring to Kyung Hee University as a Theater and Film major (she graduated in 2009 and received an Achievement Award from the College of Art and Design).

Her first post-Sam Soon project was supposed to have been the movie Thursday's Child, but the project ran into problems midway through filming. The film production company Yoon and Joon sued Kim for breach of contract and damages worth ₩1 billion, claiming that the actress was liable for their losses of more than ₩2.3 billion. She won the lawsuit in 2007, with the Seoul Central District Court ruling that Kim bore no responsibility for the shutdown of the movie. After undergoing script revisions and a change of director and lead actress (to Yunjin Kim), Thursday's Child was eventually renamed and released as Seven Days.

After a three-year hiatus caused by legal and contractual disputes, Kim finally got back to work in 2008, starring in the big-screen comedy Girl Scout, and the poorly received TV drama Night After Night (also known as When It's At Night). 2009's City Hall, where she played a low-ranking city official whose life takes a turn when she wins a pageant and later becomes the mayor, was a modest hit, with fans crediting its success to Kim's chemistry with her co-star Cha Seung-won.

Originally cast as the lead actress for 2010's I Am Legend, Kim quit before filming started due to issues with the production (she was replaced by her good friend Kim Jung-eun). Instead she chose the 2011 melodrama Scent of a Woman, which centers on a spinster who, after slaving herself at a travel agency for many years, is diagnosed that she only has six months left to live, and decides to live the rest of her life happily, turning in her resignation and leaving for a vacation of luxury. She next starred in the movie Pitch High (in Korean, Fighting Spirit), in which she played the supportive wife of a second string baseball pitcher.

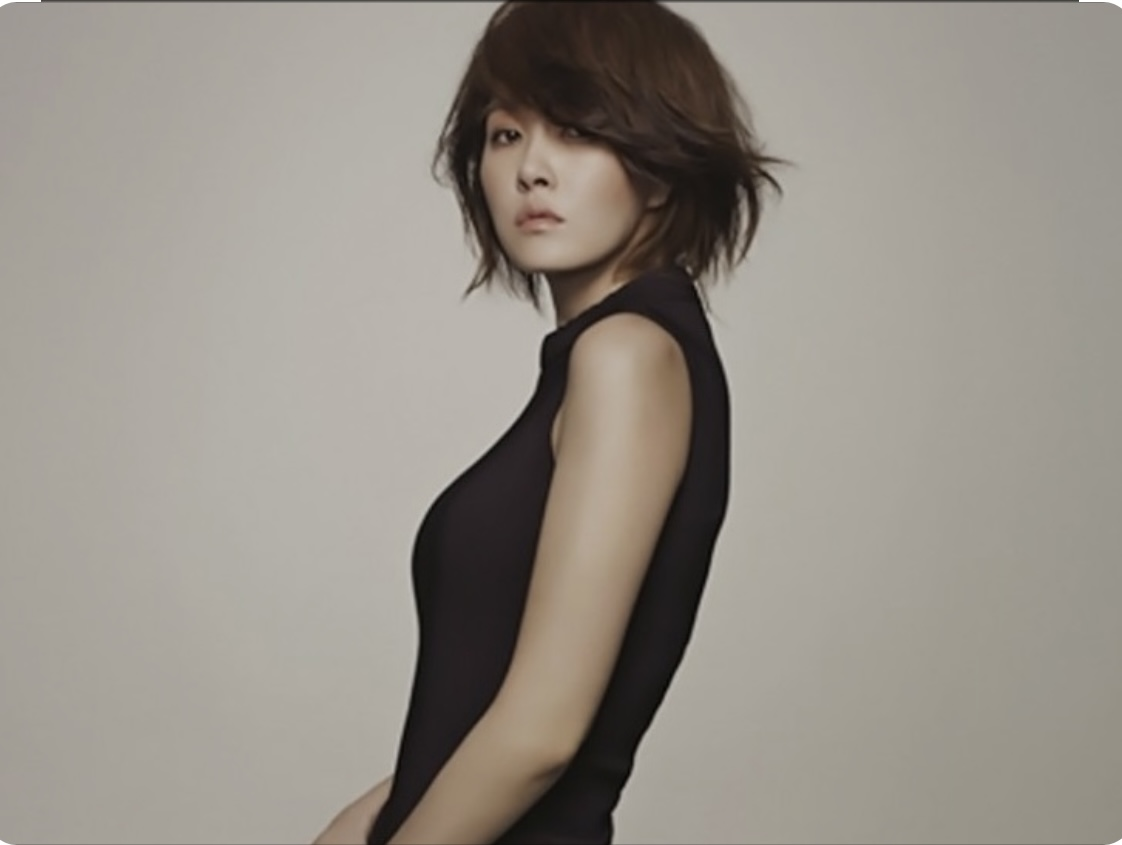
Kim in 2013

In the 2012 romantic comedy series I Do, I Do, Kim's character is a workaholic shoe designer who gets pregnant after a one-night stand with a much younger newbie employee, then meets a charming obstetrician. She returned to the big screen in 2013 thriller The Five, based on the popular webtoon by Jeong Yeon-shik, in which Kim played a woman who plots revenge against the serial killer who murdered her family and left her crippled (her performance later won Best Actress at the 34th Golden Cinema Festival).

In 2015, Kim was then cast in Masked Prosecutor, about a prosecutor by day who turns into a masked vigilante by night; Kim plays the chief of a detective squad in the violent crimes unit. In October 2015, Kim signed an exclusive contract with management agency C-JeS Entertainment.

In 2017, Kim starred in the mystery thriller series The Lady in Dignity, playing a woman from a poor family whose ambition is to become a member of the upper class. The series was a commercial and critical success, becoming JTBC's highest rated drama with a single episode rating of 12.065%. In December 2017, Kim left C-JeS Entertainment and signed with new management agency Good People Entertainment.

In 2018, Kim starred in the romance melodrama Should We Kiss First?, playing a divorced flight attendant who finds a new love, and mystery thriller drama Children of Nobody.

In January 2025, Kim signed with the new agency Y1 Entertainment.

== Personal life ==
In early 2008, Kim was involved in another controversy. Na Hoon-a, a successful trot singer with a career spanning over 40 years, was falsely rumored to have been castrated by yakuza, because he was having an affair with the mistress of a gang boss. The mistress was wildly guessed at, with the names of actresses Kim Hye-soo and Kim Sun-a thrown around (both issued official denials). Na ended up holding a press conference in which he almost stripped in order to prove the rumor was untrue, and demanded that the media apologize to the two actresses.

In 2015, Kim won the lawsuit she had filed against a plastic surgery clinic in Busan for breaching her publicity rights by using her name and photos in their advertising without her permission; she received ₩25 million in damages.

== Filmography ==
=== Film ===
Year	Title	Role	Notes/Ref.
2002	Yesterday	May	
2002	Wet Dreams	Yoo-ri	
2003	Once Upon a Time in a Battlefield	Gyebaek's wife	Cameo
2003	The Greatest Expectation	Mi-young	
2003	Happy Ero Christmas	Heo Min-kyung	
2004	S Diary	Na Jin-hee	
2005	She's on Duty	Chun Jae-in	
2007	The Worst Guy Ever	Passerby	Cameo
2008	Girl Scout	Choi Mi-kyung	
2008	Sweet Lie	First love Sun-a	Cameo
2010	Attack the Gas Station 2	Herself	Cameo
2011	Pitch High	Oh Yoo-ran	
2013	The Five	Go Eun-ah	
2016	Operation Chromite	Kim Hwa-young	Special appearance

=== Television series ===
Year	Title	Role
1997	Bang-ul-i	
1997	Three Guys and Three Girls	
1997	New York Story	
1997	White Christmas	
1998	Winners	
1998	Love and Success	Lee Mi-ran
1998	Forever Yours	Hwang Ji-young
1998	MBC Best Theater: "Her Flower Pot No. 1"	Oh Hyun-ah
1999	MBC Best Theater: "A Scent of That Winter's Day"	Joo-yeon
1999	Jump	
1999	Love Story: "Sunflower"	
2000	Joa, Joa	Woon Jo-ah
2000	Golden Era	Lee Joo-young
2003	Pretty Woman	Cameo
2005	My Lovely Sam Soon	Kim Sam-soon
2008	Night After Night	Heo Cho-hee
2009	City Hall	Shin Mi-rae
2011	Scent of a Woman	Lee Yeon-jae
2012	I Do, I Do	Hwang Ji An
2013	Competition of Roses	Shen Wei
2015	The Man in the Mask	Yoo Min-hee
2017	The Lady in Dignity	Park Bok-ja
2018	Should We Kiss First?	An Soon-jin
2018	Children of Nobody	Cha Woo-kyung
2019	Secret Boutique	Jenny Jang
2022	The Empire	Han Hye-ryul
2023	Queen of Masks	Do Jae-yi

=== Music video appearances ===
Year	Song title	Artist
2000	"I Realized Too Late"	Yoo Ji-min
2000	"Serenade"	Jinu
2000	"I Didn't Go to School"	Ryang Hyun, Ryang Ha
2000	"Time Out"	J
2007	"Three People"	Lee Ki-chan

== Musical theatre ==
Year	Title	Role
2000	Guys and Dolls	

== Accolades ==
=== Awards and nominations ===
Year	Award	Category	Nominated work	Result	Ref.
2002	23rd Blue Dragon Film Awards	Best New Actress	Wet Dreams	Nominated	
2003	26th Golden Cinematography Awards	Best New Actress	Yesterday	Won	
2003	24th Blue Dragon Film Awards	Best Leading Actress	The Greatest Expectation	Nominated	
2004	2nd CGV Viewer's Choice of the Year Awards	Best Actress	The Greatest Expectation	Won	
2004	40th Baeksang Arts Awards	Best Actress (Film)	The Greatest Expectation	Nominated	
2004	40th Baeksang Arts Awards	Most Popular Actress (Film)	The Greatest Expectation	Won	
2004	41st Grand Bell Awards	Best New Actress	The Greatest Expectation	Nominated	
2004	27th Golden Cinematography Awards	Most Popular Actress	The Greatest Expectation	Won	
2005	6th Korea Visual Arts Festival	Photogenic Award, TV Actress category	My Lovely Sam Soon	Won	
2005	Korea Green Foundation	100 People Who Brightened Our World	My Lovely Sam Soon	Won	
2005	MBC Drama Awards	Grand Prize (Daesang)	My Lovely Sam Soon	Won	
2005	MBC Drama Awards	Top Excellence Award, Actress	My Lovely Sam Soon	Won	
2005	MBC Drama Awards	Popularity Award	My Lovely Sam Soon	Won	
2005	MBC Drama Awards	Best Couple Award with Hyun Bin	My Lovely Sam Soon	Won	
2005	10th Asian Television Awards	Best Actress	My Lovely Sam Soon	Runner-up	
2005	18th Grimae Awards	Best Actress	My Lovely Sam Soon	Won	
2006	1st Seoul International Drama Awards	Best Actress	My Lovely Sam Soon	Nominated	
2006	42nd Baeksang Arts Awards	Best Actress (TV)	My Lovely Sam Soon	Nominated	
2007	19th Korean Broadcasting Producers Award	Best Performer, TV Actress category	My Lovely Sam Soon	Won	
2008	MBC Drama Awards	Top Excellence Award, Actress	Night After Night	Nominated	
2009	Kyung Hee University - College of Art and Design	Achievement Award	—N/a	Won	
2009	SBS Drama Awards	Excellence Award, Actress in a Drama Special	City Hall	Won	
2009	SBS Drama Awards	Top 10 Stars	City Hall	Won	
2011	1st Hong Kong Cable TV Awards	Best Actress	City Hall	Nominated	
2011	China Entertainment Television	Top Ten Hottest Asia Award	Scent of a Woman	Won	
2011	SBS Drama Awards	Top Excellence Award, Actress in a Weekend/Daily Drama	Scent of a Woman	Won	
2011	SBS Drama Awards	Top 10 Stars	Scent of a Woman	Won	
2012	48th Baeksang Arts Awards	Best Actress (TV)	Scent of a Woman	Nominated	
2012	MBC Drama Awards	Top Excellence Award, Actress in a Miniseries	I Do, I Do	Nominated	
2014	34th Golden Cinema Festival	Best Actress	The Five	Won	
2018	54th Baeksang Arts Awards	Best Actress (TV)	The Lady in Dignity	Nominated	
2018	6th APAN Star Awards	Top Excellence Award, Actress in a Miniseries	Should We Kiss First?	Nominated	
2018	2nd The Seoul Awards	Best Actress	Should We Kiss First?	Nominated	
2018	31st Grimae Awards	Best Actress	Should We Kiss First?	Won	
2018	SBS Drama Awards	Grand Prize (Daesang)	Should We Kiss First?	Won	
2018	SBS Drama Awards	Top Excellence Award, Actress in a Monday-Tuesday Drama	Should We Kiss First?	Nominated	
2018	SBS Drama Awards	Best Couple Award with Kam Woo-sung	Should We Kiss First?	Won	
2018	MBC Drama Awards	Grand Prize (Daesang)	Children of Nobody	Nominated	
2018	MBC Drama Awards	Top Excellence Award, Actress in a Wednesday-Thursday Drama	Children of Nobody	Won	
2019	SBS Drama Awards	Top Excellence Award, Actress in a Miniseries	Secret Boutique	Nominated	
2023	14th Korea Drama Awards	Top Excellence Award, Actress	Queen of Masks	Won	

=== State honors ===
Name of country, award ceremony, year given, and name of honor
Country	Award Ceremony	Year	Honor	Ref.
South Korea	National Tax Service (Note: Honors are given at the Taxpayers' Day ceremony by National Tax Service.)	2004	Prime ministerial commendation	
