= Shin Ji-soo =

South Korean actress and singer (born 1985)

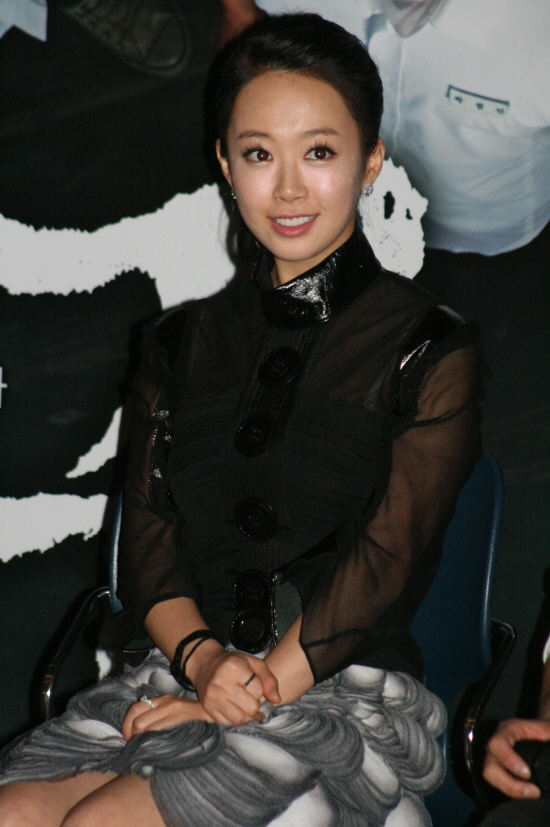
- Shin in 2010
- Born: October 28, 1985 (age 41); South Korea
- Education: Hanyang University – Theater and Film
- Occupations: Actress; singer
- Years active: 1995–present
- Agent: Y Entertainment

Korean name
- Hangul: 신지수
- RR: Sin Jisu
- MR: Sin Chisu

Shin Ji-soo (Korean: 신지수; born October 28, 1985) is a South Korean actress and singer. Shin began her entertainment career as a child actress, and has since starred in television dramas such as Virtue (2000) and Famous Princesses (2006), as well as the film The Hero (2013). In addition to acting, Shin also became part of the three-member K-pop girl group D.Heaven in 2010.

== Filmography ==
=== Television series ===
Year	Title	Role	Network
1998	To Love Is		EBS
1998	The King and the Queen	Queen Gonghye	KBS1
1999	The Little Prince		KBS2
2000	Virtue	young Jung Gwi-deok	SBS
2000	New Nonstop		MBC
2001	Why Women?		KBS2
2002	Solitude	Jo Jung-ah	KBS2
2003	MBC Best Theater: "Meet Nana J"	Runaway girl	MBC
2003	MBC Best Theater: "Lee Eun-sung, Hong Se-jin"	Lee Eun-sung/Hong Se-jin	MBC
2003	Rose Fence	Kim Kyung-mi	KBS2
2005	MBC Best Theater: "Garibong Ocean's Eleven"	Eun-soo	MBC
2006	Famous Princesses	Na Jong-chil	KBS2
2007	Thirty Thousand Miles in Search of My Son	Na Jung-min	SBS
2010	Jejungwon	Nang-rang	SBS
2010	Three Sisters	Park Jin-sook	SBS
2011	Scent of a Woman	Yang Hee-joo	SBS
2012	Big	Lee Ae-kyung	KBS2
2013	Wonderful Mama	Hee-jin	SBS
2013	Fantasy Tower	Park Hyun-jin	tvN

=== Film ===
Year	Title	Role	Notes
2003	Show Show Show	School girl 1 (cameo)	
2005	The Dark Plan of Green Tea Planet	Student	short film
2005	The Crescent Moon	Hwa-yang	
2010	Ghost (Be with Me)	So-yeong	segment: "Stay By Me"
2013	The Hero	Min-hee	
2014	Red Carpet	Strawberry	
2015	Inside Men	Penthouse girl	

=== Music video appearances ===
Year	Song title	Artist
2000	"Do You Know"	Jo Sung-mo
2008	"Haha, It's Okay"	Seo Young-eun
2010	"Like a Stranger"	D.Heaven

=== Variety show ===
Year	Title	Role
2012	설특집 스타 애정촌	Woman no. 3

== Awards and nominations ==
Year	Award	Category	Nominated work	Result
2000	SBS Drama Awards	Best Young Actress	Virtue	Won
2002	KBS Drama Awards	Best Young Actress	Solitude	Won
