= The Five (film) =

- Poster
- Directed by: Jeong Yeon-shik
- Written by: Jeong Yeon-shik
- Based on: The 5ive Hearts by Jeong Yeon-shik
- Produced by: Kang Woo-suk
- Starring: Kim Sun-a; On Joo-wan; Ma Dong-seok; Shin Jung-geun; Jung In-gi; Lee Chung-ah
- Cinematography: Kim Hyung-koo
- Edited by: Kim Chang-ju; Park Gyeong-suk
- Music by: Shim Hyeon-jeong
- Production companies: Cinema Service; KT Media Hub
- Distributed by: CJ Entertainment
- Release date: November 14, 2013
- Running time: 123 minutes
- Country: South Korea
- Language: Korean
- Box office: US$4.9 million

The Five (Korean: 더 파이브; RR: Deo paibeu) is a 2013 South Korean horror thriller film written and directed by Jeong Yeon-shik based on his own webtoon The 5ive Hearts, which first appeared on internet portal Daum in April 2011.

Kim Sun-a starred as a disabled woman who gathers four desperate people in need of organs to take revenge on the serial killer who murdered her family.

== Plot ==
Eun-ah was living a perfect, happy life with her family until a sociopathic young man named Jae-wook brutally and senselessly murders her husband and daughter in front of her eyes. Barely escaping alive herself, Eun-ah is left half-paralyzed and reliant on a wheelchair. After her recovery, she grows fixated on taking revenge on him. Two years later, following a long search, she hones in within striking distance of the killer. Faced with such a dangerous adversary and her immobility, Eun-ah gathers four people marginalized by society, each with a different skill, to help her kill Jae-wook. In exchange, she is prepared to give them something they desperately need—her organs. All four accomplices—which include a North Korean defector, an ex-gangster, a doctor, and an engineer—are in need of organ transplants for various reasons, and Eun-ah promises them her organs once her revenge is complete. But things don't go as planned, and the killer turns the tables and starts hunting them himself.

== Cast ==
- Kim Sun-a as Go Eun-ah
- On Joo-wan as Oh Jae-wook
- Ma Dong-seok as Jang Dae-ho, ex-gangster
- Shin Jung-geun as Nam-cheol, engineer
- Jung In-gi as Cheol-min, doctor
- Lee Chung-ah as Park Jeong-ha, computer technician
- Park Hyo-joo as Hye-jin, Christian social worker
- Lee Yong-yi as Jeong-ha's mother
- Jo Han-cheol as Kim Seong-il, Eun-ah's husband
- Kim Hyun-soo as Kim Ga-young, Eun-ah's daughter
- Choi Hak-rak as Jeong-do
- Jung Soo-young as Dae-ho's wife
- Yeo Min-joo as Hyeon-joo, hospital patient
- Lee Jun-hyeok as Detective Park
- Park Ji-hong as Park Kyeong-soo, parking attendant
- Han Yeon-kyeong as Chae-young, Ga-young's school friend
- Lee Seung-hoon as Min-soo
- Go Bong-gu as Sang-gu
- Oh Min-ae as Baker
- Oh Man-seok as Loan shark boss
- Kim Gyeong-ran as Minimart owner
- Kim Min-kyu
