= She'z =

South Korean girl group

- Origin: Seoul, South Korea
- Genres: K-pop; dance-pop
- Years active: 2012 - 2014
- Labels: Line Entertainment, Sony Music Entertainment Korea
- Past members: Jinah; Taeyeon; Seyeon; Jiyoung

She'z (Korean: 쉬즈) was a South Korean girl group formed by independent company Line Entertainment in 2012. The group consists of Jinah, Taeyeon, Seyeon and Jiyoung. They made their official debut on May 17, 2012 with the song "My Way" (내 맘대로).

== History ==
=== Pre-debut ===
The group has already caught the attention of the public due to their connections with famous personalities. They have been closely acquainted with numerous MCs and comedians such as Ji Suk Jin, Moon Hee Jun and so on, through their agency, Line Entertainment. They also gained attention after their company stated that all members are able to sing and perform at the level of the lead vocalist in any other idol groups, which allows She'z to experiment with several different musical genres.

Jinah and Taeyeon were appointed as MCs with Shin Dong Yup even before their official debut. They were confirmed as supporting MCs for Channel Q's ‘Miracle on 7th Street.’. The show was broadcast in mid May, right when the group had debuted.

Taeyeon, earlier in 2012, was also featured on a track by Lee Hyunwook.

=== 2012-2014: Debut and Disbandment ===
The group's music video for their debut song, "My Way" (내 맘대로), was released on their official YouTube account on May 17, 2012. They debuted on M! Countdown on the same day. The group promoted the song on other various music programs. It also ranked from #140 to #87 in Gaon Chart. Their first single was entitled "She'z Holic".

She'z also contributed to the official soundtrack of Scent of a Woman, with the song entitled "Better Tomorrow".

On June 25, 2012, they released their 1st EP entitled Night and Day (낮과밤).

However, in 2014, the group silently disbanded after releasing their last single, Another Day is Passing.

== Members ==
- Lee Jin-ah (이진아)
- Lee Tae-yeon (이태연)
- Kim Se-yeon (김세연)
- Kim Ji-young (김지영).

== Discography ==
=== EPs and single albums ===
Title	Album details	Peak chart positions	Sales
Title	Album details	KOR	Sales
Night and Day	Released: June 25, 2012; Label: Line Entertainment; Formats: CD, digital download	13	KOR: 1,602+
She'z Love Sick	Released: September 21, 2012; Label: Line Entertainment; Formats: CD, digital download	39	—

=== Singles ===
Title	Year	Peak chart	Sales (DL)	Album
Title	Year	KOR	Sales (DL)	Album
"My Way" (내맘대로)	2012	87	KOR: 38,629+	Night and Day
"Night and Day" (낮과밤)	2012	—	—	Night and Day
"UU"	2012	—	—	She'z Love Sick
"Why Am I Like This?" (왜 이럴까)	2013	—	—	Non-album singles
"That's Why It Hurts" (그래서 아프다)	2013	—	—	Non-album singles
"The Song the Wind Sings" (바람이 불러주는 노래)	2014	—	—	Non-album singles
"Another Day is Passing" (이렇게 또 하루가 간다)	2014	—	—	Non-album singles
