= Queen of Masks =

2023 South Korean television series

- Promotional poster
- Also known as: Queen of the Mask
- Hangul: 가면의 여왕
- Hanja: 假面의 女王
- RR: Gamyeonui yeowang
- MR: Kamyŏnŭi yŏwang
- Genre: Melodrama; Mystery; Revenge; Thriller; Crime
- Developed by: Channel A (planning); by Jeong Hoe-wook
- Written by: Im Do-wan
- Directed by: Kang Ho-joong
- Starring: Kim Sun-a; Oh Yoon-ah; Shin Eun-jung; Yoo Sun
- Music by: Kim Jong-cheon
- Country of origin: South Korea
- Original language: Korean
- No. of episodes: 16

Production
- Executive producers: Park Jong-eun; Kang Bo-hyun (CP); Yoon Hee-kyung (CP)
- Producers: Oh Hwan-min; Kim Gyeong-tae; Kim Dong-rae
- Production companies: The Great Show; RaemongRaein
- Budget: ₩11.2 billion

Original release
- Network: Channel A
- Release: April 24 – June 13, 2023

Queen of Masks (Korean: 가면의 여왕) is a 2023 South Korean television series starring Kim Sun-a, Oh Yoon-ah, Shin Eun-jung, and Yoo Sun. It aired on Channel A from April 24 to June 13, 2023, every Monday and Tuesday at 22:30 (KST) for 16 episodes. It is also available for streaming on Viu in selected regions.

== Synopsis ==
Four friends were involved in a murder, the three turned their backs on the fourth by pinning the accusation on her. Which prompted her to flee to the United States. Now, ten years later, that fourth friend has returned and plans to uncover the truth.

== Cast ==
=== Main ===
- Kim Sun-a as Do Jae-yi

A human rights lawyer. She is an ambitious woman who was promised as a successor while taking charge of the governor's office.

- Oh Yoon-ah as Go Yoo-na

She was involved in a murder case ten years ago. She seemed to regain her happiness by starting a family in the United States, but she returns to find her missing daughter.

- Shin Eun-jung as Joo Yoo-jung

A man appears just before she is frustrated by a series of sad things before getting married.

- Yoo Sun as Yoon Hae-mi

The first vice president of Mariana Hotel who was a regular employee. She has to have everything she wants.

=== Supporting ===
- Oh Ji-ho as Choi Kang-hoo
- Lee Jung-jin as Song Je-hyeok
- Lee Yeon-do as Yoon Hye-mi
- Shin Ji-hoon as Cha-Leo
- Jang Eui-soo as Cho Yong-pil
- Jeon Jin-ki as Jung Goo-tae
- Song Young-chang as Kang Il-goo

== Production ==
On January 5, 2023, RaemongRaein Corporation announced that it had signed a production and supply contract with Channel A for Queen of Masks, worth 11.2 billion won. It was produced in cooperation with The Great Show.

== Viewership ==
Queen of Masks : South Korea viewers per episode (thousands)

Season	Episode number															
Season	1	2	3	4	5	6	7	8	9	10	11	12	13	14	15	16
1	N/A	N/A	N/A	458	488	530	549	553	483	509	555	580	546	563	N/A	640

Source: Audience measurement performed nationwide by Nielsen Korea.

Average TV viewership ratings
Ep.	Original broadcast date	Average audience share (Nielsen Korea)	
Ep.	Original broadcast date	Nationwide	Seoul
1	April 24, 2023	1.401% (21st)	N/A
2	April 25, 2023	1.501% (22nd)	N/A
3	May 1, 2023	2.27% (14th)	N/A
4	May 2, 2023	2.413% (8th)	2.110% (8th)
5	May 8, 2023	2.482% (8th)	2.325% (7th)
6	May 9, 2023	2.423% (8th)	2.479% (6th)
7	May 15, 2023	2.635% (10th)	2.597% (7th)
8	May 16, 2023	2.892% (6th)	2.906% (4th)
9	May 22, 2023	2.591% (7th)	2.559% (4th)
10	May 23, 2023	2.650% (5th)	2.526% (6th)
11	May 29, 2023	2.869% (5th)	2.852% (4th)
12	May 30, 2023	3.084% (6th)	3.096% (4th)
13	June 5, 2023	2.819% (4th)	2.671% (5th)
14	June 6, 2023	3.107% (6th)	3.602% (4th)
15	June 12, 2023	2.280% (9th)	2.193% (5th)
16	June 13, 2023	3.349% (5th)	3.236% (5th)
Average		2.548%	2.704% (Note: This average rating is calculated based on the published ratings. The exact average rating is unknown due to multiple unpublished ratings.)
In the table above, the blue numbers represent the lowest ratings and the red numbers represent the highest ratings.; N/A denotes ratings that were not published.; This series aired on a cable channel/pay TV which normally has a relatively smaller audience compared to free-to-air TV/public broadcasters (KBS, SBS, MBC, and EBS).

== Awards and nominations ==
Name of the award ceremony, year presented, category, nominee of the award, and the result of the nomination
Award ceremony	Year	Category	Nominee / Work	Result	Ref.
Korea Drama Awards	2023	Top Excellence Award, Actress	Kim Sun-a	Won	
