= Yesterday (2002 film) =

- Poster to Yesterday (2002)
- Hangul: 예스터데이
- RR: Yeseuteodei
- MR: Yesŭt'ŏdei
- Directed by: Jeong Yoon-soo
- Written by: Jeong Yoon-soo
- Produced by: Ahn Byoung-ju
- Starring: Kim Seung-woo; Yunjin Kim; Choi Min-soo; Kim Sun-a
- Cinematography: Jeong Han-cheol
- Edited by: Kim Sun-min
- Music by: Kang Ho-jeong
- Distributed by: CJ Entertainment
- Release date: June 13, 2002 (South Korea)
- Running time: 124 minutes
- Country: South Korea
- Language: Korean
- Box office: US$1,577,164

Yesterday (Korean: 예스터데이) is a 2002 science fiction action film set in a unified Korean peninsula in the year 2020. The movie stars Kim Seung-woo, Yunjin Kim and Choi Min-soo.

== Plot ==
Yun Suk, an experienced agent from the Special Investigations Unit (SI or SIU) tries to locate and take down a serial killer, who is known only by the alias "Goliath" (taken from the Bible). His investigation, however, becomes a bit personal after Goliath instigates an incident that results in the death of his son, Hanbyul.

After Kim Hisu, the daughter of the Korean National Police Agency commissioner gets kidnapped by armed terrorists during a raid, the two work together to investigate Goliath's motives, which has something to do with a secret project formerly funded by the South Korean Defense Ministry.
