= The Man in the Mask =

- Promotional poster
- Also known as: Masked Attorney; Masked Investigator
- Genre: Action; Romance; Comedy
- Written by: Choi Jin-won
- Directed by: Jeon San; Kim Yong-soo
- Starring: Joo Sang-wook; Kim Sun-a; Um Ki-joon; Jun Kwang-ryul; Hwang Sun-hee; Lee Moon-sik
- Music by: Park seung-jin
- Country of origin: South Korea
- Original language: Korean
- No. of episodes: 16

Production
- Producer: Ahn Joon-yong
- Running time: 65 minutes
- Production company: Kim Jong-hak Production

Original release
- Network: KBS2
- Release: May 20 – July 9, 2015

The Man in the Mask (Korean: 복면검사; Hanja: 覆面檢事; RR: Bongmyeongeomsa; lit. Masked Prosecutor) is a 2015 South Korean television drama series starring Joo Sang-wook and Kim Sun-a. It aired on KBS2 from May 20 to July 9, 2015 on Wednesdays and Thursdays at 21:55 for 16 episodes.

== Plot ==
Ha Dae-chul (Joo Sang-wook) has a double identity. He is a normal prosecutor by the day and a masked vigilante at night to punish those whom the law could not. Meanwhile, Yoo Min-hee (Kim Sun-a) is a female detective in charge of the violent crime division.

== Cast ==
- Joo Sang-wook as Ha Dae-chul
  - Noh Young-hak as young Ha Dae-chul
- Kim Sun-a as Yoo Min-hee
- Um Ki-joon as Kang Hyun-woong
- Jun Kwang-ryul as Jo Sang-taek
- Hwang Sun-hee as Seo Ri-na
- Yoo Se-hyung as Moon Tae-seong
- Park Yeong-gyu as Jung Do-sung
- Lee Moon-sik as Jang Ho-sik
- Park Young-ji as Seo Min-sung
- Lee Won-jong as Ji Dong-chan
- Kim Byung-choon as Park Dong-pyo
- Hong Seok-cheon as Pi Sung-ho
- Lee Ki-young as Kang Joong-ho
- Jung Ae-ri as Im Ji-sook
- Myung Gye-nam as Song Man-seok
- Park Jung-hak as Lee Jang-kwon
- Kim Dae-ryung as Ki-ho
- Choi Sung-jae as Ki-tae
- Choi Si-won as Thief (cameo, ep. 1)

== Ratings ==
The series initially aired, two weeks after initial broadcast, on KBS World with subtitles. This was later reduced to one week.

Episode	Date of Broadcast	TNmS Ratings		AGB Nielsen	
Episode	Date of Broadcast	Nationwide	Seoul National Capital Area	Nationwide	Seoul National Capital Area
1	May 20, 2015	5.9%	6.7%	6.8%	7.6%
2	May 21, 2015	4.7%	4.6%	5.4%	5.9%
3	May 27, 2015	5.6%	6.3%	5.3%	5.7%
4	May 28, 2015	5.4%	6.4%	6.1%	6.6%
5	June 3, 2015	5.0%	5.2%	5.9%	6.2%
6	June 4, 2015	4.6%	5.2%	5.3%	5.5%
7	June 10, 2015	5.7%	5.8%	5.6%	5.7%
8	June 11, 2015	4.6%	%	5.4%	5.3%
9	June 17, 2015	4.9%	4.8%	5.7%	6.7%
10	June 18, 2015	4.9%	4.7%	4.8%	5.5%
11	June 24, 2015	5.3%	5.6%	6.0%	6.6%
12	June 25, 2015	5.1%	5.6%	5.9%	6.1%
13	July 1, 2015	4.7%	%	5.6%	5.9%
14	July 2, 2015	4.5%	4.7%	5.3%	5.7%
15	July 8, 2015	5.0%	5.3%	5.9%	6.4%
16	July 9, 2015	5.9%	%	6.9%	7.2%
Series average		5.11%	%	5.74%	6.16%

== International broadcast ==
- It aired in Vietnam from November 11, 2016 on HTV2.
- It aired in Indonesia from April 23, 2016 on RTV.
