= The Greatest Expectation =

- Theatrical poster
- Hangul: 위대한 유산
- Hanja: 偉大한 遺産
- RR: Widaehan yusan
- MR: Widaehan yusan
- Directed by: Oh Sang-hun
- Written by: Lee Hyeon-cheol; Lee Won-hyeong; Lee Won-jae; Go Yun-gyeong
- Produced by: Lee Kang-bok
- Starring: Im Chang-jung; Kim Sun-a; Shin Yi; Kim Soo-mi
- Cinematography: Lee Seok-hyun
- Edited by: Kyung Min-ho
- Music by: Jo Seong-woo
- Distributed by: CJ Entertainment
- Release date: 24 October 2003
- Running time: 115 minutes
- Country: South Korea
- Language: Korean

The Greatest Expectation (Korean: 위대한 유산) is a 2003 South Korean romantic comedy film.

== Plot ==
Chang-sik (Im Chang-jung) lives strictly by the freeloader's handbook, doing the rounds of free samples in department store food sections and sponging off of his older brother. Mi-young (Kim Sun-a) nurtures grandiose dreams of becoming a TV actress but has failed every audition because she just cannot act. Because the two are unemployed, live in the same neighborhood, and have similar schedules, they are bound to run into each other, and they do. One day, Chang-sik and Mi-young are walking around distractedly when they collide. Chang-sik's coins spill out from his hands and scatter all over the ground. He chases after every single one but ends up 10 cents short. He viciously turns to the Mi-young but she refuses to give him 10 cents.

They become sworn enemies after this incident, but then they witness a hit-and-run involving old man Hwang. The next day, to their amazement, they see a banner advertising a ₩5 million reward for eyewitnesses. Of course, each person eagerly offers to be a witness and ends up getting tangled up in something they had not bargained for.
