= Wet Dreams (film) =

2002 film by Jeong Cho-sin

- Theatrical release poster
- Hangul: 몽정기
- Hanja: 夢精기
- RR: Mongjeonggi
- MR: Mongjŏnggi
- Directed by: Jung Cho-sin
- Written by: Park Cha-wun
- Produced by: Choi Jin-hwa
- Starring: Lee Beom-soo; Kim Sun-a; No Hyeong-wuk; Jeon Jae-hyeong
- Cinematography: Seo Jeong-min
- Edited by: Nam Na-yeong
- Production company: Kang Je-gyu Films
- Distributed by: A-Line
- Release date: November 6, 2002 (South Korea)
- Running time: 94 minutes
- Country: South Korea
- Language: Korean
- Budget: ₩1.8 billion

Wet Dreams (Korean: 몽정기; RR: Mongjeonggi) is a 2002 South Korean film. Inspired partly by American gross-out comedies like American Pie, it follows the sexual misadventures of four boys through middle and high school. While American Pie had been a flop in Korea, Wet Dreams was a surprise box office hit and led to a sequel, Wet Dreams 2.

== Cast ==
- Lee Beom-soo
- Kim Sun-a
- No Hyeong-wuk
- Jeon Jae-hyeong

== Production and investments ==
The company Kang Je-gyu Films originally tried to make the film, aiming for a July release. The film was distributed by company A-Line, which was a distributing company co-founded by Samsung, KTB Entertainment, Egg Film, and Kang Je-gyu Films. On April 28, 2002, the casting of actor Lee Beom-soo and actress Kim Sun-a was confirmed, with crank in starting around May and an expected filming period of two months, aiming for an August release. Company HumanCom funded ₩300 million out of estimated budget of ₩1.8 billion for the film.
