= Happy Ero Christmas =

- Theatrical poster
- Hangul: 해피 에로 크리스마스
- RR: Haepi ero keuriseumaseu
- MR: Haep'i ero k'ŭrisŭmasŭ
- Directed by: Lee Kun-dong
- Written by: Lee Kun-dong
- Produced by: Hwang Woo-hyun; Hwang Jae-woo
- Starring: Cha Tae-hyun; Kim Sun-a
- Cinematography: Choi Young-taek
- Edited by: Kim Yong-soo
- Music by: Kim Dae-hong; Kim Yang-hee
- Distributed by: Tube Entertainment
- Release date: December 17, 2003
- Running time: 119 minutes
- Country: South Korea
- Language: Korean

Happy Ero Christmas (Korean: 해피 에로 크리스마스) is a 2003 South Korean romantic comedy film starring Cha Tae-hyun and Kim Sun-a.

== Plot ==
Byung-ki (Cha Tae-hyun) is a taciturn village patrolman who helps out with trivial tasks like distributing promotional papers, though he dreams of fighting evil. One day, he runs into Min-kyung (Kim Sun-a), an employee at the neighborhood bowling alley, and falls for her at first sight. However, his attempts to woo her go unnoticed. Meanwhile, Seok-doo (Park Yeong-gyu), the boss of the local gang, also swoons over Min-kyung and vows to take her virginity on Christmas Eve.

== Cast ==
- Cha Tae-hyun as Sung Byung-ki
- Kim Sun-a as Heo Min-kyung
- Park Yeong-gyu as Bang Seok-doo
- Hong Kyung-in as Noh Dong-chool
- Kim Ji-young as Park Hyang-sook
- Park Won-sang as Henchman 1
- Yang Ik-june as Henchman 2
- Jang Hang-sun as Ero chairman
- Kim Jung-ki as Baek Chil-yong
- Oh Tae-kyung as Jo Dong-kwan
- Baek Bong-ki as Noh Hae-chool
- Lee Chung-ah as Lee Hae-min
- Lee Mi-hwa as Lee Bo-young
- Park Choong-seon as Police substation chief
- Jung Suk-yong as Sergeant Park
- Jeon Seon-hwa as Lee Soo-jin
- Yoo Seung-ho as Children's angel choir
