= Jeong Yeon-shik =

- Born: August 6, 1967 (age 59); South Korea
- Occupations: Film director, screenwriter, web-cartoon artist

Korean name
- Hangul: 정연식
- RR: Jeong Yeonsik
- MR: Chŏng Yŏnsik

Jeong Yeon-shik (born August 6, 1967) is a South Korean film director, screenwriter and web-cartoon artist. Jeong worked as a commercials director and illustrator before he became known for his web-cartoons Moonlight Shoes and The 5ive Hearts. His directorial feature debut - the thriller The Five (2013), is based on his webtoon The 5ive Hearts, making him the first webtoonist turned film director in Korea.

== Filmography ==
- The Five (2013) - director, screenwriter, original story

== Webtoon ==
- Moonlight Shoes
- The 5ive Hearts
