= The City Hall (TV series) =

- Promotional poster
- Genre: Romance; Comedy; Drama
- Written by: Kim Eun-sook
- Directed by: Shin Woo-chul
- Starring: Kim Sun-a; Cha Seung-won
- Country of origin: South Korea
- Original language: Korean
- No. of episodes: 20

Production
- Production location: South Korea
- Running time: Wednesdays and Thursdays at 21:55 (KST)
- Production company: Yein Culture

Original release
- Network: Seoul Broadcasting System
- Release: April 29 – July 2, 2009

The City Hall (Korean: 시티홀) is a 2009 South Korean television series starring Kim Sun-a and Cha Seung-won. It aired on SBS from April 29 to July 2, 2009 on Wednesdays and Thursdays at 21:55 for 20 episodes.

Written by Kim Eun-sook and directed by Shin Woo-chul, the story revolves around a low-ranking government clerk who becomes the youngest mayor of the fictional Inju City, and her romance with an ambitious and cynical deputy mayor.

== Synopsis ==
For the past seven years, Shin Mi-rae has been the lowest ranking public servant working in Inju City Hall. Her main job is to serve coffee to the high-ranking public officials. Mi-rae owes a huge credit card debt, so she enters a beauty pageant to win the first prize of ₩20,000,000 (approximately US$20,000). But when the prize money ends up in the corrupt mayor's pocket, Mi-rae holds a one-person demonstration in front of the city hall. After a series of ups and downs, Mi-rae gets her prize money, but has no choice but to resign from her job. After the beautiful but obnoxious councilwoman Min Joo-hwa mocks Mi-rae for losing her job at her bar, Mi-rae retaliates by denying her access to the toilet until she wets her skirt in front of journalists. When the situation is leaked to the press, the mayor resigns as well. The job of mayor is up for grabs and Mi-rae becomes nominated as a mayoral candidate. With the support of her followers and the backing of Jo Gook, the powerful deputy mayor, she becomes elected as the youngest mayor of Inju. With no political background but filled with the desire to genuinely work for her constituents, Mi-rae begins to reform the bureaucratic culture of the city hall administration. But in the process she butts heads with the cold-hearted and cool-headed Jo Gook, who had an ulterior motive in installing her and has presidential ambitions of his own.

== Cast ==
=== Main ===
- Kim Sun-a as Shin Mi-rae
- Cha Seung-won as Jo Gook
- Chu Sang-mi as Min Joo-hwa
- Lee Hyung-chul as Lee Jung-do
- Yoon Se-ah as Go Go-hae

=== Supporting ===
- Lee Joon-hyuk as Ha Soo-in
- Jung Soo-young as Jung Boo-mi
- Park Joo-ah as Yoo Kwon-ja, Shin Mi-rae's mother
- Choi Il-hwa as BB
- Cha Hwa-yeon as Jo Yong-hee, Jo Gook's mother
- Kim Jin-sang as Jo Rang
- Choi Sang-hoon as So Yoo-han
- Yeom Dong-hwan as Mayor Go Boo-shil
- Park Tae-kyung as Boo Jeong-han
- Kwon Da-hyun as Bong Sun-hwa
- Kang Joo-hyung as Mang Hae-ra
- Yang Jae-sung as Kang Tae-gong
- Kim Dong-gun as Park Ah-cheom
- Shin Jung-geun as Director Ji
- Choi Dae-sung as "Eraser"
- Kim Ah-rang as "Run Honey"
- Kim Neul-mae as "Rooftop Cat"
- Moon Hee-soo as "Jessica Alba"
- Chae Geon as young Jo Gook
- Yoon Chae-rin as young Shin Mi-rae
- Kim Gun as Yang
- Min Joon-hyun as reporter Lee Jik-pil
- Im Dae-il as Director Moon
- Ryu Sung-han as Director Byun
- Lee Jae-goo as Ye-san
- Hong Ji-min as Madame Jung (ep. 15)
- Kim Dong-gyun
- Nam Hyun-joo
- Kim Sung-oh

== Soundtrack ==
1. 다 잘 될 거야 - Noh Young-shim
2. 그래 나를 믿자 (Okay, I'll Believe in Myself) - Jung-in feat. Bizzy
3. 불안한 사랑 (Uncertain Love) - Horan of Clazziquai
4. 미래's 왈츠 (Mi-rae's Waltz) - Noh Young-shim
5. 웃어봐 (Smile) - Chae Dong-ha of SG Wannabe
6. Bright Funk - Noh Young-shim
7. 이사랑 부제; 이사랑 버리자 (This Love) - Position
8. 저무는 길 - Kim Jung-bae, Han Seol-hee
9. 희망찬 미래 - Noh Young-shim
10. Tension - Noh Young-shim
11. 정치적 In 멜로디 - Noh Young-shim
12. One Dream - Seo Moon-tak
13. 그럴 순 없어 - Noh Young-shim
14. 회기 불능 - Noh Young-shim
15. 다시 돌아갈 수 있을까 - Noh Young-shim
16. 저무는 길 Piano Ver. - Noh Young-shim
17. 캐슬 허슬 - Noh Young-shim
18. 종친다 - Noh Young-shim
19. 그래 나를 믿자 Shuffle Ver. - Noh Young-shim
20. Memory - Noh Young-shim
21. 사랑하고 사랑합니다 (Bonus Track) - Park Sang-woo of Bohemian

== Ratings ==
In the table below, the blue numbers represent the lowest ratings and the red numbers represent the highest ratings.

Date	Episode	Nationwide	Seoul
2009-04-29	1	13.9 (7th)	14.9 (8th)
2009-04-30	2	14.6 (5th)	16.0 (3rd)
2009-05-06	3	15.3 (5th)	16.3 (3rd)
2009-05-07	4	16.7 (2nd)	17.8 (2nd)
2009-05-13	5	14.6 (5th)	15.4 (3rd)
2009-05-14	6	16.4 (3rd)	17.2 (3rd)
2009-05-20	7	15.3 (4th)	16.6 (3rd)
2009-05-21	8	17.8 (3rd)	18.3 (3rd)
2009-05-27	9	15.5 (4th)	15.8 (3rd)
2009-05-28	10	16.9 (2nd)	17.8 (2nd)
2009-06-03	11	16.7 (3rd)	17.4 (2nd)
2009-06-04	12	16.8 (4th)	17.6 (3rd)
2009-06-10	13	17.0 (4th)	17.1 (3rd)
2009-06-11	14	14.1 (3rd)	14.6 (2nd)
2009-06-17	15	16.7 (3rd)	17.8 (3rd)
2009-06-18	16	17.4 (2nd)	18.9 (2nd)
2009-06-24	17	18.0 (3rd)	19.4 (2nd)
2009-06-25	18	18.3 (2nd)	20.0 (2nd)
2009-07-01	19	17.6 (2nd)	18.8 (2nd)
2009-07-02	20	19.6 (2nd)	20.8 (2nd)
Average		16.5%	17.4%

== Awards ==
2009 SBS Drama Awards

- Excellence Award, Actor in a Drama Special: Cha Seung-won
- Excellence Award, Actress in a Drama Special: Kim Sun-a
- Top 10 Stars: Cha Seung-won, Kim Sun-a

== International broadcast ==
- It aired in Vietnam on HTV3 from January 2, 2010, under the title Nữ Thị Trưởng.
- It aired in Indonesia on B-Channel from October 9, 2013, under the title Kemenangan Kedua.
