= Scent of a Woman (TV series) =

2011 South Korean television drama series

- Promotional poster
- Hangul: 여인의 향기
- Hanja: 女人의 香氣
- RR: Yeoinui hyanggi
- MR: Yŏinŭi hyanggi
- Genre: Romance; Drama
- Developed by: SBS Drama Division (Planning)
- Written by: Noh Ji-seol
- Directed by: Park Hyung-ki
- Starring: Kim Sun-a; Lee Dong-wook; Um Ki-joon; Seo Hyo-rim
- Music by: Choi Chul-ho
- Country of origin: South Korea
- Original language: Korean
- No. of episodes: 16

Production
- Production locations: South Korea; Japan
- Production company: AStory

Original release
- Network: SBS TV
- Release: 23 July – 11 September 2011

Scent of a Woman (Korean: 여인의 향기; RR: Yeoinui hyanggi) is a 2011 South Korean television drama series starring Kim Sun-a, Lee Dong-wook, Um Ki-joon and Seo Hyo-rim. It aired on SBS from July 23 to September 11, 2011 on Saturdays and Sundays at 21:55 for 16 episodes.

== Synopsis ==
As a single, unmarried woman in her mid-thirties, Lee Yeon-jae (Kim Sun-a) is meek and timid, considered a spinster by society. After spending ten years working for the same travel company owned by Kang Chul-man, she is falsely accused of stealing from a client. In addition to enduring the accusations of her superiors, she is diagnosed with gallbladder cancer with approximately six months left to live. Mustering up her courage, Yeon-jae resigns and embraces her remaining six months of life.

Embarking on her first vacation alone, she splurges on clothes and flies first-class to Okinawa Island, Japan, where she runs into the man of her dreams, Kang Ji-wook (Lee Dong-wook), who happens to be the son of her former boss. Ji-wook is a rich young man, cynical and lifeless, until he falls in love with Yeon-jae. Together they live out a series of misadventures, both comical and bittersweet, as Yeon-jae completes each dream in her Bucket List.

== Cast ==
=== Main characters ===
- Kim Sun-a as Lee Yeon-jae
- Lee Dong-wook as Kang Ji-wook
- Um Ki-joon as Chae Eun-suk
- Seo Hyo-rim as Im Se-kyung

=== Supporting characters ===
- Kim Hye-ok as Kim Soon-jung, Yeon-jae's mother
- Sa Hyun-jin as Yoo Hye-won, Yeon-jae's best friend
- Choi Jung-hoon as Oh Sang-mok, Yeon-jae's and Soon-jung's hot-tempered landlord
- Lee Jung-gil as Kang Chul-man, Ji-wook's father
- Park Jung-sun as Park Sang-woo
- Kim Kwang-kyu as Yoon Bong-kil, Yeon-jae's office mate/tango instructor Ramses
- Shin Jung-geun as Noh Sang-shik, Yeon-jae's office manager
- Son Seong-yoon as Nam Na-ri
- Namkoong Won as Im Joong-hee, Se-kyung's father
- Shin Ji-soo as Yang Hee-joo, cancer patient who treats Yeon-jae as her elder sister
- Cha Ji-yeon as Cha Ji-yeon, tango instructor
- Kim Junsu as Kim Junsu (cameo, episode 5)
- Kwon Oh-joong as Kwon Yool, Yeon-jae's first love (cameo, episode 8)
- Lee Won-jong as Andy Wilson, pianist
- Jung Dong-hwan as Kim Dong-myung, Yeon-jae's high school teacher

== Original soundtrack ==
1. Blue bird – Rottyful Sky
2. You are so beautiful – Junsu
3. 유앤아이 (You and I) – MBLAQ
4. 버킷리스트 (Bucket list) – JK Kim Dong-wook
5. Better Tomorrow – She'z
6. 화답 (Response) – Lee Young-hyun
7. 유앤아이 (You and I) – Fly High
8. Una Notte Perfetta – Edan
9. Promise U
10. Blue Tango
11. The Dancer
12. Jalousie – La Ventana
13. 키다리 아저씨 (Daddy-Long-Legs)
14. Por una cabeza
15. Yeon-jae's Theme
16. Babu Babu
17. 여인의 향기 (Scent of a woman)
18. You are so beautiful (Edit ver.) – Junsu

== Episode ratings ==
Episode #	Original broadcast date	Average audience share			
Episode #	Original broadcast date	TNmS Ratings		AGB Nielsen	
Episode #	Original broadcast date	Nationwide	Seoul National Capital Area	Nationwide	Seoul National Capital Area
1	23 July 2011	13.9%	15.8%	15.8%	15.6%
2	24 July 2011	13.9%	15.1%	15.6%	19.0%
3	30 July 2011	13.1%	15.4%	15.1%	16.8%
4	31 July 2011	12.5%	13.4%	15.7%	17.8%
5	6 August 2011	16.2%	18.5%	18.6%	20.6%
6	7 August 2011	17.0%	18.6%	18.3%	20.6%
7	13 August 2011	16.8%	19.6%	18.0%	20.4%
8	14 August 2011	16.7%	19.7%	17.1%	19.1%
9	20 August 2011	17.8%	21.5%	18.2%	20.3%
10	21 August 2011	18.6%	21.9%	18.3%	20.2%
11	27 August 2011	16.7%	18.8%	18.8%	21.0%
12	28 August 2011	16.4%	18.7%	18.8%	21.3%
13	3 September 2011	16.4%	19.6%	17.7%	19.8%
14	4 September 2011	16.4%	18.1%	18.2%	20.4%
15	10 September 2011	15.7%	17.1%	16.7%	17.9%
16	11 September 2011	14.1%	14.9%	14.1%	15.4%
Average		15.7%	17.9%	17.2%	19.3%

== Awards and nominations ==
Year	Award	Category	Recipient	Result
2011	CETV Awards	Top Ten Hottest Asia Award	Kim Sun-a	Won
2011	4th Korea Drama Awards	Best Supporting Actor	Um Ki-joon	Nominated
2011	SBS Drama Awards	Top Excellence Award, Actor in a Weekend Drama	Lee Dong-wook	Won
2011	SBS Drama Awards	Top Excellence Award, Actress in a Weekend Drama	Kim Sun-a	Won
2011	SBS Drama Awards	Excellence Award, Actor in a Weekend Drama	Um Ki-joon	Won
2011	SBS Drama Awards	Special Acting Award, Actress in a Weekend Drama	Kim Hye-ok	Won
2011	SBS Drama Awards	Top 10 Stars	Lee Dong-wook	Won
2011	SBS Drama Awards	Top 10 Stars	Kim Sun-a	Won
2011	SBS Drama Awards	New Star Award	Seo Hyo-rim	Won
2012	48th Baeksang Arts Awards	Best Actress (TV)	Kim Sun-a	Nominated
2012	7th Seoul International Drama Awards	Outstanding Korean Drama	Scent of a Woman	Nominated

== International broadcast ==
In September 2011, it was announced that the drama's rights were sold eight Asian countries, including Philippines, Hong Kong, Taiwan, Singapore, Cambodia, Malaysia, Indonesia and Vietnam. This was followed by promotional events attended by the two lead actors, Kim Sun-a and Lee Dong-wook on December 5–6 in Singapore and Malaysia, respectively, for ONE TV ASIA.

It first aired in Japan on cable channel KNTV from July 23 to September 11, 2011. It was re-aired on TBS as part of the network's "Hallyu Select Frame" beginning June 7, 2012, and on cable channel BS-Japan.

It first aired in Vietnam on BTV4 from November 15, 2014.

It first aired in Thailand on Channel 7 beginning December 8, 2015.

In Sri Lanka, it is available to stream with subtitles on Iflix.
