= Want a Taste? =

2019–2020 South Korean television series

- Promotional poster
- Also known as: Wanna Taste?
- Hangul: 맛 좀 보실래요?
- Lit.: Would You Like To Taste?
- RR: Mat jom bosillaeyo?
- MR: Mat chom posillaeyo?
- Genre: Melodrama
- Written by: Kim Do-hyun
- Directed by: Yoon Ryu-hae
- Starring: Shim Yi-young; Seo Do-young; Seo Ha-joon
- Ending theme: "I Can Only See You" (너밖에 안 보여) by Kim Chan-hyuk
- Country of origin: South Korea
- Original language: Korean
- No. of episodes: 124 (Note: Originally scheduled to air for 120 episodes, the series was extended by four episodes.)

Production
- Camera setup: Single-camera
- Running time: 35 minutes
- Production company: Celltrion Entertainment

Original release
- Network: SBS TV
- Release: November 12, 2019 – May 1, 2020

Want A Taste? (Korean: 맛 좀 보실래요) is a South Korean television series starring Shim Yi-young, Seo Do-young and Seo Ha-joon. It aired daily on SBS TV from November 12, 2019 to May 1, 2020 at 8:35 a.m. (KST) for 124 episodes.

== Plot ==
Hae-Jin (Shim Yi-Young) is 36-years-old. She is married to Jin-Sang (Seo Ha-Jun), who is 6 years younger than her, and they have a daughter Yoo-Ri (Shin Bi). Hae-Jin runs a restaurant that she took over from her father-in-law. She supported her husband Jin-Sang while he studied to enter a university. Because of Hae-Jin, Jin-Sang is now attending a prestigious university, but he has an affair with Joo-Ri (Han Ga-Rim). She is the young daughter of a rich family. Hae-Jin becomes aware of her husband's affair, but she doesn't want a divorce. Meanwhile, Dae-Gu (Seo Do-Young) appears in front Hae-Jin. Dae-Gu is a drama series writer. He was once in demand for his screenwriting, but his popularity has waned. His marriage life is not doing well either.

== Cast ==
=== Main ===
- Shim Yi-young as Kang Hae-jin
- Seo Do-young as Oh Dae-gu
- Seo Ha-joon as Lee Jin-sang
- Han Ga-rim as Jung Joo-ri
- Lee Seul-ah as Bae Yoo-ram
- Choi Woo-seok as Jung Joon-ho

=== Supporting ===
- Lee Duk-hee as Oh Ok-bun
- Song In-guk as Kang Cheol-jin
- Shin Bi as Lee Yoo-ri
- Lim Chae-mu as Lee Baek-soo
- Ahn Ye-in as Lee Jin-bong
- Kim Jung-hwa as Han Jeong-won
- Lee Hyun-kyung as Do Yeon-gyeong

=== Others ===
- Jang Seon-yul as Oh Gwang-ju
- Heo Cham as Heo Eui-ruo
- Lee Jong-gu as Han Dong-san
- Seo Sang-won
- Park Seong-chan
- Lee Chan-hee
- Lee Cho-won
- Ahm Ji-hun
- Hong Seung-bum
- Jung Yi-rang
- Ok Ju-ri
- Eunmi Jeon
- Byun Gun-woo
- Hur Soo-jung
- Jung Hyeon-cheol
- Oda-eun
- Yang Jeong-su
- Kyung Kang-moon
- Lee Sook
- Kim Jung-soo

=== Special appearances ===
- Hwang Myung-hwan
- Chu Gwi-jeong
- Shim Ji-ho
- Yeon Do-yeon

== Production ==
Want A Taste? was initially planned as an evening daily drama, airing Monday to Friday 7:20 p.m., replacing Bubbly Lovely in June 2017. It was supposed to feature the reunion of Lee Tae-ran and Ryu Jin 17 years after they starred in weekend drama More Than Love; they would have been cast together with Shim Ji-ho, Han Bo-reum, and Hwang Ji-hyun in the roles of Kang Hae-jin (Shim Yi-young), Oh Dae-gu (Seo Do-young), Lee Jin-sang (Seo Ha-joon), Jung Joo-ri (Han Ga-rim) and Bae Yoo-ram (Lee Seul-ah), respectively. However, due to the financial losses and the low ratings of You Are a Gift and Bubbly Lovely (average of 7.6% and 7.8%, respectively), SBS decided to cancel the timeslot. It was revived as a morning daily drama airing Monday to Friday 8:35 a.m. more than two years later, with Kim Do-hyun still being the writer but with the cast being totally replaced.

== Ratings ==
- In this table, the blue numbers represent the lowest ratings and the red numbers represent the highest ratings.
- N/A denotes that the rating is not known.

Ep.	Original broadcast date	Average audience share		
Ep.	Original broadcast date	AGB Nielsen		TNmS
Ep.	Original broadcast date	Nationwide	Seoul	Nationwide
1	November 12, 2019	5.5%	5.7%	6.1%
2	November 13, 2019	4.9%	5.2%	5.8%
3	November 14, 2019	5.4%	5.4%	6.0%
4	November 15, 2019	5.6%	5.2%	6.2%
5	November 18, 2019	4.8%	—N/a	6.3%
6	November 19, 2019	6.2%	6.3%	6.7%
7	November 20, 2019	4.6%	—N/a	6.3%
8	November 21, 2019	5.0%	4.7%	6.4%
9	November 22, 2019	5.2%	4.9%	6.0%
10	November 25, 2019	4.8%	—N/a	5.7%
11	November 26, 2019	3.6%	—N/a	—N/a
12	November 27, 2019	5.1%	—N/a	6.5%
13	November 28, 2019	5.7%	5.7%	6.7%
14	November 29, 2019	4.1%	—N/a	
15	December 2, 2019	5.5%	5.4%	6.4%
16	December 3, 2019	5.5%	5.1%	6.2%
17	December 4, 2019	5.1%	5.0%	5.7%
18	December 5, 2019	6.1%	5.5%	7.0%
19	December 6, 2019	5.8%	5.6%	6.9%
20	December 9, 2019	5.2%	—N/a	6.7%
21	December 10, 2019	5.9%	6.2%	6.7%
22	December 11, 2019	5.3%	5.4%	5.9%
23	December 12, 2019	5.8%	6.1%	6.7%
24	December 13, 2019	6.0%	5.8%	6.7%
25	December 16, 2019	5.3%	—N/a	7.2%
26	December 17, 2019	5.9%	5.7%	7.1%
27	December 18, 2019	5.5%	5.6%	6.8%
28	December 19, 2019	5.7%	5.3%	7.4%
29	December 20, 2019	6.6%	6.6%	7.3%
30	December 23, 2019	6.0%	5.7%	7.1%
31	December 24, 2019	6.5%	6.2%	7.4%
32	December 25, 2019	4.8%	—N/a	5.5%
33	December 26, 2019	6.0%	6.1%	7.3%
34	December 27, 2019	6.6%	6.6%	7.3%
35	December 30, 2019	6.5%	6.6%	6.5%
36	December 31, 2019	6.7%	6.5%	7.2%
37	January 1, 2020	4.7%	—N/a	
38	January 2, 2020	6.5%	6.3%	7.0%
39	January 3, 2020	6.8%	6.8%	7.8%
40	January 6, 2020	5.7%	5.6%	7.0%
41	January 7, 2020	6.5%	6.4%	7.5%
42	January 8, 2020	5.9%	6.0%	6.6%
43	January 9, 2020	6.1%	6.3%	7.6%
44	January 10, 2020	6.7%	6.7%	7.7%
45	January 13, 2020	6.5%	6.2%	8.6%
46	January 14, 2020	6.8%	6.6%	8.0%
47	January 15, 2020	6.6%	6.4%	7.2%
48	January 16, 2020	7.3%	7.1%	8.2%
49	January 17, 2020	6.9%	6.8%	8.3%
50	January 20, 2020	7.2%	6.7%	7.7%
51	January 21, 2020	7.3%	6.9%	7.8%
52	January 22, 2020	7.0%	6.7%	7.3%
53	January 23, 2020	7.3%	6.7%	7.7%
54	January 24, 2020	5.8%	5.5%	6.4%
55	January 27, 2020	6.2%	—N/a	7.0%
56	January 28, 2020	7.2%	6.6%	7.7%
57	January 29, 2020	7.3%	6.9%	7.4%
58	January 30, 2020	7.4%	6.1%	—N/a
59	January 31, 2020	7.7%	7.3%	8.8%
60	February 3, 2020	7.3%	7.0%	9.3%
61	February 4, 2020	7.6%	7.2%	8.9%
62	February 5, 2020	7.4%	7.0%	8.9%
63	February 6, 2020	7.9%	7.1%	9.7%
64	February 7, 2020	7.9%	7.2%	9.5%
65	February 10, 2020	7.6%	7.2%	10.1%
66	February 11, 2020	8.7%	8.4%	9.8%
67	February 12, 2020	7.3%	6.7%	9.1%
68	February 13, 2020	8.2%	8.0%	9.5%
69	February 14, 2020	7.7%	7.2%	9.8%
70	February 17, 2020	7.6%	6.8%	8.8%
71	February 18, 2020	8.2%	7.7%	0.7%
72	February 19, 2020	7.9%	7.7%	9.6%
73	February 20, 2020	8.2%	7.7%	9.7%
74	February 21, 2020	8.2%	7.7%	9.1%
75	February 24, 2020	7.9%	7.3%	9.8%
76	February 25, 2020	8.7%	8.2%	10.0%
77	February 26, 2020	8.7%	7.9%	10.0%
78	February 27, 2020	9.0%	8.3%	10.3%
79	February 28, 2020	8.9%	7.8%	10.3%
80	March 2, 2020	8.5%	7.6%	9.4%
81	March 3, 2020	9.3%	9.0%	10.1%
82	March 4, 2020	8.9%	8.1%	9.7%
83	March 5, 2020	8.6%	8.0%	9.6%
84	March 6, 2020	8.4%	7.4%	10.0%
85	March 9, 2020	8.9%	8.3%	9.8%
86	March 10, 2020	8.8%	7.9%	10.2%
87	March 11, 2020	9.1%	8.6%	10.1%
88	March 12, 2020	9.5%	8.9%	10.1%
89	March 13, 2020	8.9%	7.6%	9.3%
90	March 16, 2020	9.0%	7.9%	9.9%
91	March 17, 2020	8.7%	7.4%	10.4%
92	March 18, 2020	8.8%	7.7%	10.0%
93	March 19, 2020	8.7%	7.8%	9.6%
94	March 20, 2020	9.0%	8.4%	9.6%
95	March 23, 2020	9.4%	8.7%	10.4%
96	March 24, 2020	8.6%	8.1%	9.9%
97	March 25, 2020	8.1%	7.7%	9.9%
98	March 26, 2020	9.2%	8.1%	10.7%
99	March 27, 2020	8.4%	7.6%	11.1%
100	March 30, 2020	8.4%	7.7%	10.4%
101	March 31, 2020	8.4%	7.8%	10.0%
102	April 1, 2020	9.2%	8.7%	10.7%
103	April 2, 2020	9.1%	8.3%	11.0%
104	April 3, 2020	9.1%	9.6%	10.6%
105	April 6, 2020	9.1%	7.9%	10.3%
106	April 7, 2020	9.7%	8.7%	11.0%
107	April 8, 2020	8.7%	8.0%	9.6%
108	April 9, 2020	9.7%	9.0%	10.7%
109	April 10, 2020	9.1%	8.2%	10.1%
110	April 13, 2020	9.3%	8.3%	10.2%
111	April 14, 2020	9.5%	8.7%	10.3%
112	April 15, 2020	8.6%	8.1%	—N/a
113	April 16, 2020	9.1%	8.4%	10.9%
114	April 17, 2020	9.0%	8.2%	9.8%
115	April 20, 2020	8.1%	7.6%	9.8%
116	April 21, 2020	8.8%	7.6%	10.2%
117	April 22, 2020	8.7%	7.8%	10.4%
118	April 23, 2020	9.1%	8.4%	10.9%
119	April 24, 2020	9.0%	8.4%	10.2%
120	April 27, 2020	8.9%	8.7%	9.8%
121	April 28, 2020	8.4%	7.7%	10.1%
122	April 29, 2020	8.0%	7.5%	9.4%
123	April 30, 2020	8.8%	8.5%	9.8%
124	May 1, 2020	8.6%	7.9%	10.1%
Average		7.4%	— (Note: Due to some ratings not recorded, the exact average rating is unknown.)	—
