= Secret Boutique =

2019 South Korean television series

- Promotional poster
- Hangul: 시크릿 부티크
- RR: Sikeurit butikeu
- MR: Sik'ŭrit put'ik'ŭ
- Genre: Revenge; Thriller
- Written by: Heo Seon-hee
- Directed by: Park Hyung-ki
- Starring: Kim Sun-a; Chang Mi-hee; Park Hee-von; Go Min-si; Kim Jae-young; Kim Tae-hoon
- Music by: Jung Se-rin (Movie Closer)
- Country of origin: South Korea
- Original language: Korean
- No. of episodes: 16

Production
- Producer: Song Kyung-hwa
- Camera setup: Single-camera
- Running time: 70 minutes
- Production company: The Story Works

Original release
- Network: SBS TV
- Release: September 18 – November 28, 2019

Secret Boutique (Korean: 시크릿 부티크) is a 2019 South Korean television series starring Kim Sun-a, Chang Mi-hee, Park Hee-von, Go Min-si, Kim Jae-young and Kim Tae-hoon. It aired on SBS TV from September 18 to November 28, 2019.

The series is the last Wednesday-Thursday Drama Special project (수목 드라마 스페셜) of SBS. (Note: After the series, SBS's Wednesday-Thursday time slot was discontinued and it was replaced with new entertainment programs in December 2019, starting with Wook Talk on Wednesdays, and Delicious Rendezvous on Thursdays.)

== Synopsis ==
Secret Boutique is a female-centric drama about money, power, revenge and survival.

It follows the story of Jenny Jang (Kim Sun-a), the owner of J-Boutique that looks like a normal clothing and accessories store from the outside, but is actually a secret network connecting the political and business circles to a small law firm that secretly solves problems of the upper class.

== Cast ==
=== Main ===
- Kim Sun-a as Jenny Jang / Jang Do-young, an orphan who goes from working at a bathhouse to becoming an influential lobbyist.
  - Jung Da-eun as young Jenny Jang
  - Park Seo-kyung as 10 year-old Jang Do-yeong
- Chang Mi-hee as Kim Yeo-ok
- Park Hee-von as Wi Ye-nam
- Go Min-si as Lee Hyeon-ji
- Kim Jae-young as Yoon Seon-woo
- Kim Tae-hoon as Wi Jung-hyuk
  - Yoo Jung-woo as Wi Jung-hyuk (20 years old)

=== Supporting ===
- Ryu Seung-soo as Cha Seung-jae
- Ryu Won as Wi Ye-eun
- Chang Ryul as Lee Joo-ho
- Han Jung-soo as Mr. Hwang
- Joo Suk-tae as Oh Tae Suk, Intelligence Chief of Yoong Chun PD.

== Production ==
- Actress Lee Mi-sook was cast for the series but withdrew for personal reasons.
- The first script reading was held on March 14, 2019 at SBS Ilsan Production Center.
- The series was planned to be the succeeding drama to My Absolute Boyfriend, but was pushed back from its July premiere to September due to the suspension of the Monday-Tuesday drama timeslot.
- Filming was wrapped up on October 6, 2019.

== Ratings ==
Ep.	Part	Original broadcast date	Average audience share (Nielsen Korea)	
Ep.	Part	Original broadcast date	Nationwide	Seoul
1	1	September 18, 2019	3.8%	N/A
1	2	September 18, 2019	4.6%	4.9%
2	1	September 19, 2019	4.3%	N/A
2	2	September 19, 2019	4.5%	5.0%
3	1	September 25, 2019	4.4%	N/A
3	2	September 25, 2019	5.0%	4.8%
4	1	September 26, 2019	4.9%	4.6%
4	2	September 26, 2019	4.9%	4.8%
5	1	October 2, 2019	4.6%	4.6%
5	2	October 2, 2019	5.3%	5.3%
6	1	October 3, 2019	5.4%	5.2%
6	2	October 3, 2019	5.8%	5.7%
7	1	October 9, 2019	4.1%	N/A
7	2	October 9, 2019	5.0%	5.1%
8	1	October 16, 2019 (Note: Broadcast is delayed due to the SBS Sports 2019 KBO postseason playoff broadcast.)	4.2%	N/A
8	2	October 16, 2019	5.4%	5.0%
9	1	October 24, 2019	4.3%	4.9%
9	2	October 24, 2019	4.0%	4.6%
10	1	October 30, 2019	3.1%	N/A
10	2	October 30, 2019	3.6%	3.8%
11	1	October 31, 2019	3.8%	N/A
11	2	October 31, 2019	4.0%	4.5%
12	1	November 13, 2019	2.8%	N/A
12	2	November 13, 2019	3.2%	N/A
13	1	November 14, 2019	3.2%	N/A
13	2	November 14, 2019	3.5%	N/A
14	1	November 20, 2019	2.5%	N/A
14	2	November 20, 2019	3.0%	N/A
15	1	November 27, 2019 (Note: Broadcast is delayed due to the 40th Blue Dragon Film Awards broadcast.)	4.6%	N/A
15	2	November 27, 2019	5.2%	6.0%
16	1	November 28, 2019	5.5%	5.7%
16	2	November 28, 2019	6.0%	6.1%
Average			4.3%	— (Note: Due to some unpublished ratings, the exact average rating is unknown.)
In the table above, the blue numbers represent the lowest ratings and the red numbers represent the highest ratings.; N/A denotes that the rating is not known.; Each night's broadcast is divided into two 30-minute parts with a commercial break in between.
