= 2018 SBS Drama Awards =

26th edition of award ceremony

- Date: December 31, 2018
- Site: SBS Prism Tower, Sangam-dong, Mapo District, Seoul, South Korea
- Hosted by: Shin Dong-yup; Shin Hye-sun; Lee Je-hoon

Television coverage
- Network: SBS
- Duration: 260 minutes

The 2018 SBS Drama Awards, presented by Seoul Broadcasting System (SBS), took place on December 31, 2018 at SBS Prism Tower, Sangam-dong, Mapo District, Seoul, South Korea. It was hosted by Shin Dong-yup, Shin Hye-sun, and Lee Je-hoon.

== Winners and nominees ==
(Winners denoted in bold)

Grand Prize (Daesang)
**Kam Woo-sung** and **Kim Sun-ah** – **Should We Kiss First?**
Drama of the Year	Character of the Year
**Where Stars Land**	**Bong Tae-gyu**, **Park Ki-woong**, **Shin Sung-rok**, and **Yoon Jong-hoon** - **Evil Avengers** from **Return**; Ahn Hyo-seop, Jo Hyun-sik, and Lee Do-hyun - Rowing Team from Still 17
Top Excellence Award, Actor in a Monday–Tuesday Drama	Top Excellence Award, Actress in a Monday–Tuesday Drama
**Lee Je-hoon** – **Where Stars Land**; Jang Hyuk - Wok of Love; Junho - Wok of Love; Kam Woo-sung - Should We Kiss First?	**Shin Hye-sun** - **Still 17**; Jung Ryeo-won - Wok of Love; Kim Sun-ah - Should We Kiss First?; Lee Mi-sook - Wok of Love
Top Excellence Award, Actor in a Wednesday–Thursday Drama	Top Excellence Award, Actress in a Wednesday–Thursday Drama
**Choi Jin-hyuk** and **Shin Sung-rok** - **The Last Empress**; Go Soo - Heart Surgeons; Lee Jin-wook - Return	**Jang Na-ra** - **The Last Empress**; Han Ye-ri - Switch: Change the World; Hwang Jung-eum - The Undateables; Park Jin-hee - Return
Top Excellence Award, Actor in a Daily/Weekend Drama	Top Excellence Award, Actress in a Daily/Weekend Drama
**Kim Jaewon** - **Let Me Introduce Her**; Oh Dae-gyu - Happy Sisters; Ryu Soo-young - Nice Witch; Song Jae-rim - Secret Mother	**Song Yoon-ah** - **Secret Mother**; Nam Sang-mi - Let Me Introduce Her; Woo Hee-jin - I Am the Mother Too; Yunjin Kim - Ms. Ma, Nemesis
Excellence Award, Actor in a Monday–Tuesday Drama	Excellence Award, Actress in a Monday–Tuesday Drama
**Yang Se-jong** - **Still 17**; Kim Sung-soo - Should We Kiss First?; Lee Dong-gun - Where Stars Land; Oh Ji-ho - Should We Kiss First?	**Chae Soo-bin** - **Where Stars Land**; Kim Ji-soo - Where Stars Land; Park Ji-young - Wok of Love; Park Si-yeon - Should We Kiss First?
Excellence Award, Actor in a Wednesday–Thursday Drama	Excellence Award, Actress in a Wednesday–Thursday Drama
**Yoon Shi-yoon** - **Your Honor**; Bong Tae Gyu and Park Ki-woong - Return; Uhm Ki-joon - Heart Surgeons	**Seo Ji-hye** - **Heart Surgeons**; Jung Eun-chae - Return; Lee Elijah - The Last Empress; Lee Yoo-young - Your Honor
Excellence Award, Actor in a Daily/Weekend Drama	Excellence Award, Actress in a Daily/Weekend Drama
**Jung Woong-in** - **Ms. Ma, Nemesis**; Alex Chu - I Am the Mother Too; Bae Soo-bin - Nice Witch; Kim Tae-woo - Secret Mother	**Kim So-yeon** - **Secret Mother**; Han Da-gam - Let Me Introduce Her; Shim Yi-young - Happy Sisters; Yoon Se-ah - Nice Witch
Best New Actor	Best New Actress
**Ahn Hyo-seop** - **Still 17**; Ahn Woo-yeon - Nice Witch; Kim Ro-woon - Where Stars Land; Yoon Jong-hoon - Return	**Lee Yoo-young** - **Your Honor**; Kwon Nara - Your Honor; Lee Soo-kyung - Where Stars Land; Shin Hye-jeong - Nice Witch
Best Supporting Actor	Best Supporting Actress
**Im Won-hee** - **Wok of Love**; Choi Dae-hoon - Heart Surgeons; Heo Sung-tae - Your Honor; Kim Kyung-nam - Where Stars Land; Oh Dae-hwan - Return	**Ye Ji-won** - **Still 17**; Kim Jae-hwa - Secret Mother; Ko Sung-hee - Ms. Ma, Nemesis; Moon Hee-kyung - Nice Witch, Ms. Ma, Nemesis; Park Kyung-hee - Heart Surgeons
Youth Acting Award	Best Couple Award
**Park Si-eun** - **Still 17**; Lee Han-seo - Nice Witch; Oh Ah-rin - The Last Empress; Yoon Chan-young - Still 17	**Kam Woo-sung** and **Kim Sun-ah** - **Should We Kiss First?**; Lee Je-hoon and Chae Soo-bin - Where Stars Land; Yang Se-jong and Shin Hye-sun - Still 17
Producer Award
**Uhm Ki-joon** - **Heart Surgeons**; **Nam Sang-mi** - **Let Me Introduce Her**

== Presenters ==
Order	Presenter	Award
1	Yang Se-jong, Kim Da-som	Best New Actor/Actress
2	Uhm Ki-joon	Best Character Award
3	Jang Hyun-sung, Park Jin-joo	Best Supporting Actor/Actress
4	Choi Jin-hyuk, Jang Na-ra	Best Couple Award
5	Lee Si-hoon	Drama of the Year
6	Kim So-yeon	Youth Acting Award
7	Ahn Nae-sang, Son Yeo-eun	Excellence Award in a Weekend/Daily Drama
8	Lee Sang-yeob, Nam Ji-hyun	Excellence Award in a Wednesday-Thursday Drama
9	Kwon Yul, Park Se-young	Excellence Award in a Monday-Tuesday Drama
10	Son Chang-min	Producer Award
11	Jung Il-woo, Go Ara	Top Excellence Award in a Weekend/Daily Drama
12	Kim Nam-gil, Lee Ha-nui	Top Excellence Award in a Wednesday-Thursday Drama
13	Lee Soon-jae, Bae Suzy	Top Excellence Award in a Monday-Tuesday Drama
14	Ji Sung	Grand Prize (Daesang)

== Special performances ==
Order	Artist	Performed
1	Shin Hye-sun, Lee Je-hoon	Intro
2	Casts of Matilda the Musical	"When I Grow Up" + "Naughty"
3	Boys on the Ship (배탄소년단) (Ahn Hyo-seop, Jo Hyun-sik, Lee Do-hyun)	"One Candle" (촛불 하나)

== See also ==
- 2018 KBS Drama Awards
- 2018 MBC Drama Awards
