= Seo Eun-soo =

South Korean actress (born 1994)

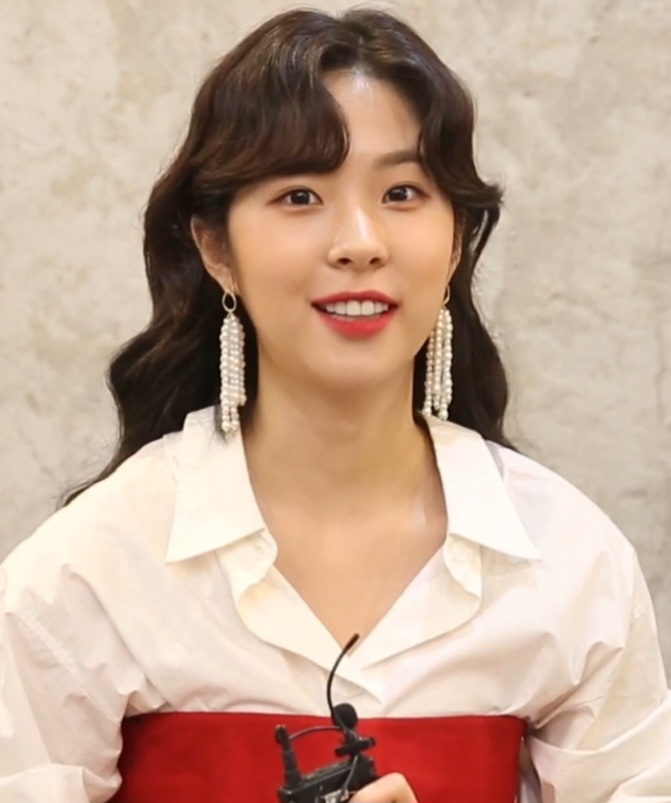
- Seo in January 2020
- Born: Lee Jeong-min; March 2, 1994 (age 32); South Korea
- Education: Korea National University of Arts (Department of Acting)
- Occupations: Actress; model
- Years active: 2015–present
- Agent: HighZium Studio

Korean name
- Hangul: 이정민
- RR: I Jeongmin
- MR: I Chŏngmin

Stage name
- Hangul: 서은수
- RR: Seo Eunsu
- MR: Sŏ Ŭnsu
- Website: highziumstudio.com

Lee Jeong-min (Korean: 이정민; born March 2, 1994), known professionally as Seo Eun-soo (서은수), is a South Korean actress and model. Seo made her acting debut in the 2016 television drama Don't Dare to Dream (2016). Seo received her big break after portraying the role of Seo Ji-soo in the KBS2 family drama My Golden Life (2017–2018). She appeared in other popular dramas, such as Dr. Romantic (2016), Duel (2017), Top Management (2018), and Legal High (2019). Her other works include The Smile Has Left Your Eyes (2018), Unlock My Boss (2022), Missing: The Other Side (2020–2023), and The Witch: Part 2. The Other One (2022).

== Early life and education ==
Seo was born on March 2, 1994. Seo wanted to be an actress while she was in elementary school, but her parents disapproved of her aspirations. From the second grade of middle school until the second grade of high school, she focused on dancing. When she was a sophomore at Haeundae, she dreamed of becoming an actress by making a monologue and she was acting by herself while watching the work. She finally enrolled in the acting program at the Korea National University of Arts in 2013 and graduated there with a degree in acting. In 2015, she began acting in commercials, which attracted the public's attention. Several dramas starred the actress.

== Career ==
=== 2015: Predebut and career beginnings ===
Seo had always wanted to be an actress, but it took her a long time to persuade her parents to allow her enroll in acting classes. She enrolled in the Korea National University of Arts in 2013, and it was about that time, while she was looking for part-time work, that she received her first offer to appear in a commercial in 2015.

=== 2016–present: Acting debut and career ===
She started her acting career as she took the lead role in the short film Hongeo: Fermented Skate Fish (2016) and her first television appearance in the series Don't Dare to Dream (2016), which was quickly followed by the drama series Dr. Romantic (2016). In the 2016 SBS television program, Don't Dare to Dream, Seo made her acting debut. She was cast as one of the leads in the OCN sci-fi thriller Duel in 2017. She received her big break in the same year by portraying the sister of Shin Hye-sun's character in the popular KBS2 family drama My Golden Life. For her performance in the show, she took home the Best New Actress prize at the 11th Korea Drama Awards. The drama also won her nominations for Best New Actress at the 54th Baeksang Arts Awards and the 2017 KBS Drama Awards.

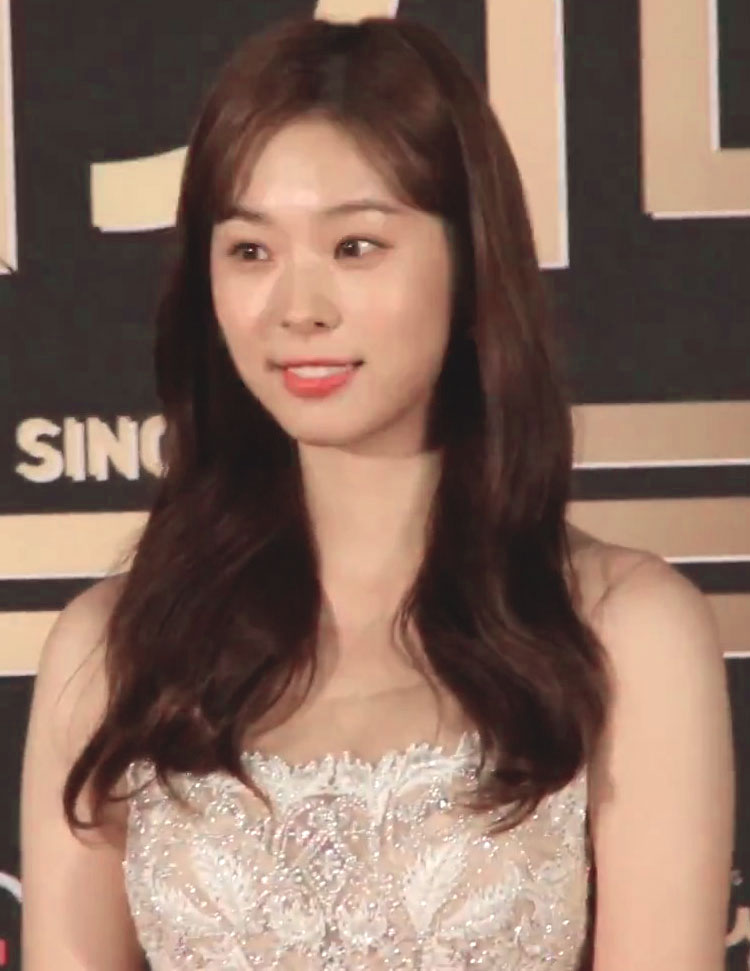
Seo in December 2017

She portrayed a passionate and upright new lawyer in the JTBC legal drama Legal High in 2019. She joined the OCN fantasy thriller Missing: The Other Side in 2020.

In early 2022, she starred in the political drama Kingmaker (2021) and appeared in the movie The Witch: Part 2. The Other One.

== Filmography ==
=== Film ===
Year	Title	Role	Ref.
2016	Hongeo: Fermented Skate Fish	Yeon Je-gwang	
2018	Young Poem	Hee Kyung	
2018	On Your Wedding Day	Park Min-kyung	
2022	Kingmaker	Soo Yeon	
2022	The Witch: Part 2. The Other One	Jo-hyun	
2025	Good News	Anchorwoman (Cameo)	

=== Television series ===
Year	Title	Role	Notes	Ref.
2016	Don't Dare to Dream	Lee Hong-dan		
2016	Dr. Romantic	Woo Yeon-hwa	Season 1	
2017	Duel	Ryu Mi-rae		
2017–2018	My Golden Life	Seo Ji-soo		
2018	The Smile Has Left Your Eyes	Baek Seung-ah		
2019	Legal High	Seo Jae-in		
2019	Hotel del Luna	Veronica	Cameo (episode 11)	
2020	Itaewon Class	Part-time job applicant	Cameo (episode 6)	
2020	Dinner Mate	flight attendant	Cameo (episode 1–2)	
2020	Missing: The Other Side	Choi Yeo-na	Season 1	
2022–2023	Unlock My Boss	Jung Se-yeon		
2024	Chief Detective 1958	Lee Hye-ju		
2025–2026	Made in Korea	Oh Ye-jin		

=== Web series ===
Year	Title	Role	Ref.
2018	Top Management	Eun-sung	

=== Television shows ===
Year	Title	Role	Notes	Ref.
2018	4 Wheeled Restaurant	Cast member	Season 2	

== Accolades ==
=== Awards and nominations ===
Name of the award ceremony, year presented, category, nominee of the award, and the result of the nomination
Award ceremony	Year	Category	Nominee / Work	Result	Ref.
Asia Artist Awards	2017	Rising Star Award	Seo Eun-soo	Won	
Baeksang Arts Awards	2018	Best New Actress – Television	My Golden Life	Nominated	
Blue Dragon Film Awards	2022	Best Supporting Actress	The Witch: Part 2. The Other One	Nominated	
Blue Dragon Series Awards	2026	Best Supporting Actress	Made in Korea	Nominated	
KBS Drama Awards	2017	Best New Actress	My Golden Life	Nominated	
Korea Drama Awards	2018	Best New Actress	My Golden Life	Won	
Korea Marketing Awards	2017	Tomorrow's Rising Star Award (Rising Star)	Seo Eun-soo	Won	

=== Listicles ===
Name of publisher, year listed, name of listicle, and placement
Publisher	Year	Listicle	Placement	Ref.
Sports Dong-a	2018	The Star that Will Shine in 2018 (Actor)	Shortlist (Note: Shortlisted with Dong-ha, Kim Seon-ho, Ha Jun, and Won Jin-ah)	
