= The Girl Downstairs =

The Girl Downstairs may refer to:

- The Girl Downstairs (film), a 1938 American romantic comedy film
- The Girl Downstairs (manhwa), a 2019 South Korean manhwa series
