= Duel (South Korean TV series) =

2017 South Korean television series

- Promotional poster
- Hangul: 듀얼
- RR: Dyueol
- MR: Tyuŏl
- Genre: Sci-fi; Thriller; Suspense; Crime
- Created by: Studio Dragon; Choi Jin-hee
- Written by: Kim Yoon-joo
- Directed by: Lee Jong-jae (Ep. 1-16); Choi Young-soo (Ep. 3-16)
- Creative directors: Lee Suk-young; Han Hye-jin
- Starring: Jung Jae-young; Yang Se-jong; Kim Jung-eun; Seo Eun-soo
- Composer: Eom Ki-yeob
- Country of origin: South Korea
- Original language: Korean
- No. of episodes: 16

Production
- Executive producers: Kim Young-gyu; Kim Sang-heon
- Producers: Lee Sung-hoon; Yoo Seul-gi
- Cinematography: Jang Deok-hwan; Kim Joon-gyum
- Editor: Choi Jung-won
- Camera setup: Single-camera
- Running time: 60 minutes
- Production company: Chorokbaem Media

Original release
- Network: OCN
- Release: June 3 – July 23, 2017

Duel (Korean: 듀얼; RR: Dyueol) is a 2017 South Korean television series starring Jung Jae-young, Kim Jung-eun, Yang Se-jong and Seo Eun-soo. It aired on OCN from June 3 to July 23, 2017 on Saturdays and Sundays at 22:00 (KST) for 16 episodes.

== Synopsis ==
Story about Jang Deuk-cheon (Jung Jae-young), a hardened detective cop whose daughter is kidnapped. He starts to chase down the suspect using the one clue he has: Two men with the same face were at the crime scene.

== Cast ==
=== Main ===
- Jung Jae-young as Jang Deuk-cheon
- Yang Se-jong as Lee Sung-joon / Lee Sung-hoon / Lee Yong-seob
- Kim Jung-eun as Choi Jo-hye
- Seo Eun-soo as Ryu Mi-rae

=== Supporting ===
==== People around Jang Deuk-cheon ====
- Lee Na-yoon as Jang Soo-yeon
- Yoon Kyung-ho as Lee Hyung-sik
- Choi Woong as Na Soo-ho

==== People around Choi Jo-hye ====
- Lee Ye-eun as Na Song-yi
- Lee Sung-wook as Go Bon-seok

==== People around Ryu Mi-rae ====
- Kim Ki-doo as Kim Ik-hong

==== Extended ====
- Lee Cheol-min as Park Yoo-shik
- Im Il-gyu as Cha Gil-ho
- Shim Wan-joon as Yang Man-choon
- Jang Ri-woo as Yang Man-choon's subordinate
- Kim Kwang-seob as Yang Man-choon's subordinate
- Joo Boo-jin as Jang Deuk-cheon's landlord
- Kim Ji-yoo as Ahn Hye-joo
- Jo Jae-ryong as Jin Byung-joon
- Jo Jae-wan as Choi Joo-sik
- Lee Hae-young as Park Dong-seul
- Jung Jin-seo as Park Min-ji
- Kang Tae-ho as Kang Hyun-geun
- Choi Kwang-je as Department Head Baek
- Jung Doo-gyum as Oh Byung-cheon
- Kim Si-eun as Joo-ah
- Yoo Ha-bok as Director Han
- Kim Nan-hee as Kim Hye-jin
- Kim Dong-beom as Cha Ki-dong
- Song Joon-hee as Lee Sung-hoon
- Kim Bo-jung as Ryu Jung-sook
- Jo Soo-hyang as Park Seo-jin
- Uhm Soo-jung as Han Yoo-ra
- Park Ji-il as Park San-young
- Kang Ji-hoo as Park Seo-ryong
- Choi Beom-ho as Jang Soo-yeon's doctor-in-charge

=== Special appearances ===
- Joo Suk-tae as Ahn Jung-dong (Ep. 1)
- Ha Ji-eun as Hye-joo's mother (Ep. 1)
- Jung Soon-won as Operating victim (Ep. 1)
- Cuckoo Crew (Ep. 2)

== Production ==
- Screenwriter Kim Yoon-joo is known for her hit drama Nine: Nine Time Travels, which was also co-produced by Chorokbaem Media (Duel's co-producing company).
- Duel reunited Yang Se-jong and Seo Eun-soo, who appeared together in SBS's hit medical drama Dr. Romantic in 2016.
- First script reading took place March 31, 2017 in Sangam-dong, Seoul, South Korea.

== Original soundtrack ==
Duel OST Album

Soundtrack album by Various artists
- Released: 2017
- Genre: Soundtrack
- Languages: Korean, English
- Label: CJ E&M

=== Part 1 ===
No.	Title	Lyrics	Music	Artist	Length
1.	"Nightmare" (악몽)	HONE; Go Young-hwan	Kang Kyung-ah; Go Young-hwan	Mad Soul Child	03:48
Total length:					03:48

=== Part 2 ===
No.	Title	Lyrics	Music	Artist	Length
1.	"Because of You" (니가 있기에)	Kim Ji-soo	Kim Ji-soo	Kang Si-ra	03:52
Total length:					03:52

== Ratings ==
- In this table, the blue numbers represent the lowest ratings and the red numbers represent the highest ratings.
- N/A denotes that the rating is not known.

Ep.	Original broadcast date	Average audience share		
Ep.	Original broadcast date	AGB Nielsen		TNmS
Ep.	Original broadcast date	Nationwide	Seoul	Nationwide
1	June 3, 2017	2.028%	2.385%	1.2%
2	June 4, 2017	1.938%	2.160%	1.2%
3	June 10, 2017	1.966%	2.431%	1.2%
4	June 11, 2017	2.182%	2.853%	1.2%
5	June 17, 2017	1.502%	—N/a	1.1%
6	June 18, 2017	1.949%	2.390%	1.6%
7	June 24, 2017	1.530%	1.998%	1.2%
8	June 25, 2017	1.796%	2.098%	1.3%
9	July 1, 2017	1.666%	1.968%	1.0%
10	July 2, 2017	1.703%	1.905%	1.3%
11	July 8, 2017	1.567%	—N/a	1.3%
12	July 9, 2017	1.730%	1.958%	1.6%
13	July 15, 2017	1.426%	1.570%	1.3%
14	July 16, 2017	1.598%	1.647%	1.3%
15	July 22, 2017	1.316%	—N/a	1.4%
16	July 23, 2017	1.668%	1.629%	1.5%
Average		1.723%	— (Note: Due to some ratings not recorded, the exact average rating is unknown.)	1.3%
