= 11th Korea Drama Awards =

2018 edition of award ceremony

- Date: October 2, 2018
- Site: Gyeongnam Culture and Art Center, Jinju, South Gyeongsang Province
- Hosted by: Cho U-jong, Gong Seo-young

The 11th Korea Drama Awards is an awards ceremony for excellence in television in South Korea. It was held at the Gyeongnam Culture and Art Center in Jinju, South Gyeongsang Province on October 2, 2018.

== Nominations and winners ==
(Winners denoted in bold)

Grand Prize (Daesang)	Best Drama
**Yoo Dong-geun** – **Marry Me Now**; Lee Mi-sook – Money Flower; Lee Byung-hun – Mr. Sunshine; Chun Ho-jin – My Golden Life	**Marry Me Now** (KBS2); My Mister (tvN); Money Flower (MBC); My Golden Life (KBS2)
Best Production Director	Best Screenplay
	**Park Pil-joo** – **Marry Me Now**; Park Hae-young – My Mister; Lee Myung-hee – Money Flower; So Hyun-kyung – My Golden Life
Top Excellence Award, Actor	Top Excellence Award, Actress
**Kam Woo-sung** – **Should We Kiss First?**; Park Seo-joon – What's Wrong with Secretary Kim; Park Si-hoo – My Golden Life; Lee Sang-woo – Marry Me Now	**Wang Bit-na** – **Mysterious Personal Shopper**; Shin Hye-sun – My Golden Life; Jung Yu-mi – Live; Han Ji-hye – Marry Me Now
Excellence Award, Actor	Excellence Award, Actress
**Hwang Chan-sung** – **What's Wrong with Secretary Kim**; **On Joo-wan** – **Man in the Kitchen**; Ryu Soo-young – Nice Witch; Seo Kang-joon – Are You Human?	**Chae Jung-an** – **Suits**; Park Se-young – Money Flower; Shin Se-kyung – Black Knight: The Man Who Guards Me; Uee – My Contracted Husband, Mr. Oh
Best New Actor	Best New Actress
**Cha Eun-woo** – **Gangnam Beauty**; Lee Shi-kang – Happy Sisters; Yeo Hoe-hyun – Marry Me Now; Wi Ha-joon – Something in the Rain	**Seo Eun-soo** – **My Golden Life**; Kim Tae-ri – Mr. Sunshine; Park Se-wan – Marry Me Now; Jung Hye-sung – Oh, the Mysterious
Best Original Soundtrack	Hallyu Star Award
**"The Person Within Me" (Monday Kiz)** – **Marry Me Now**; "Because I Only See You" (Kim Na-young) – What's Wrong with Secretary Kim; "Days Without Tears" (Kim Yoon-ah) – Mr. Sunshine; "No Longer Mine" (Roy Kim) – Familiar Wife	**Hwang Chan-sung** – **What's Wrong with Secretary Kim**; **Cha Eun-woo** – **Gangnam Beauty**
Lifetime Achievement Award	Star of the Year Award
**Kim Young-ok**	**Jo Woo-ri** – **Gangnam Beauty**
Popular Character Award	KDA Award
**Jung Sang-hoon** – **My Contracted Husband, Mr. Oh**; **Pyo Ye-jin** – **What's Wrong with Secretary Kim**	**Park Jung-sook**
