= The Girl Downstairs (manhwa) =

2019–2022 South Korean webtoon

- The Girl Downstairs Promotional Poster- Bilibili

이두나! RR: I Duna! MR: I Tuna!
- Genre: Romance
- Author: Min Songa
- Webtoon service: Naver Webtoon (Korean); Line Webtoon (English)
- Original run: July 17, 2019 – July 13, 2022
- Volumes: 5

The Girl Downstairs
- Directed by: Dong Yi
- Theme music composer: Yang Bingyin
- Country of origin: China
- Original language: Chinese
- No. of episodes: 22 (China); 12 (Japan)

Production
- Animators: Jianghu Studio; Red Dog Culture House
- Production company: Bilibili

Original release
- Network: Bilibili
- Release: April 20, 2023 – present
- Network: Fuji TV (B8station)
- Release: July 4 – September 19, 2024

The Girl Downstairs, known in South Korea as Lee Doo-na! (Korean: 이두나!) is a South Korean manhwa released as a webtoon written and illustrated by Min Songa. It was serialized via Naver Corporation's webtoon platform, Naver Webtoon, from July 2019 to July 2022, with the individual chapters collected and published into five volumes. The manhwa has been published in English by Line Webtoon.

It was adapted into a Chinese animated series (Chinese: 爱上她的理由; pinyin: Ài shàng tā de lǐyóu), which premiered on Bilibili on April 20, 2023. and later received a live-action series adaptation, which premiered on October 20, 2023 on Netflix.

== Media ==
=== Manhwa ===
Min Songa launched The Girl Downstairs in Naver's webtoon platform Naver Webtoon on July 17, 2019.

==== Volumes ====
No.	Korean release date	Korean ISBN
1	July 25, 2023	979-1-16-779281-5
2	July 25, 2023	979-1-16-779282-2
3	August 30, 2023	979-1-16-779290-7
4	October 31, 2023	979-1-16-779328-7
5	October 31, 2023	979-1-16-779329-4

=== Animated series ===
A Chinese animated series produced by Jianghu Studio and Red Dog Culture House was streamed on Bilibili in April 2023 and has 22 episodes. A Japanese dub version of the series aired on Fuji TV's B8station programming block later from July to September 2024. A second season has been announced and is scheduled to be released in 2028.

=== Live-action series ===
A live-action series adaptation of the series was streamed on Netflix on October 20, 2023. It stars Bae Suzy and Yang Se-jong and was directed by Lee Jeong-hyo.

== In other media ==
The series was featured on the South Korean reality music show Webtoon Singer, premiered on the streaming service TVING on February 17, 2023, which featured K-pop artists' performances combining webtoons with extended reality technology.

== See also ==
- Nano List, another manhwa series by the same author
