= My Golden Life =

2017 South Korean television series

- Promotional poster
- Hangul: 황금빛 내 인생
- Hanja: 黃金빛 내 人生
- RR: Hwanggeumbit nae insaeng
- MR: Hwanggŭmpit nae insaeng
- Genre: Family; Melodrama
- Created by: KBS Drama Production
- Written by: So Hyun-kyung
- Directed by: Kim Hyung-seok
- Creative director: Choi Yoon-seok
- Starring: Park Si-hoo; Shin Hye-sun; Lee Tae-hwan; Seo Eun-soo
- Country of origin: South Korea
- Original language: Korean
- No. of episodes: 52

Production
- Executive producers: Bae Kyung-soo (KBS); Choi Jin-hee; Park Ji-young; Kim Jin-yi
- Producers: Kang Min-kyung; Kim Ki-jae
- Camera setup: Single-camera
- Running time: 65 minutes
- Production company: Studio Dragon

Original release
- Network: KBS2
- Release: September 2, 2017 – March 11, 2018

My Golden Life (Korean: 황금빛 내 인생) is a 2017–18 South Korean television series starring Park Si-hoo, Shin Hye-sun, Lee Tae-hwan, and Seo Eun-soo. The series was originally broadcast on KBS2 every Saturday and Sunday from September 2017 to March 2018 between 19:55 to 21:15 (KST).

== Synopsis ==
Revolves around a woman who has a chance to rise in status but falls into a bottomless pit, and eventually finds a chance to seek happiness. It also involves a man who tries to find happiness in her.

== Cast ==
=== Main ===
- Park Si-hoo as Choi Do-kyung

He is the sole heir to Haeseong Group and the head of the Strategic Planning Team. A third-generation chaebol, he returned from the United States after completing his MBA. Unlike many wealthy heirs, he strives to practice noblesse oblige and behaves with refined manners. His life changes significantly when Seo Ji-an, a woman involved in a car accident with him, is identified as his long-lost sister, Choi Eun-seok.

- Shin Hye-sun as Seo Ji-an

She is on a probationary contact two-year contract with the marketing team of Haeseong Group. Before her family went bankrupt 10 years ago, she was a popular student known for her competitive spirit and cheerful personality. Now, she aspires to become a full-time employee of Haeseong Group. However, after losing that opportunity due to wealthy and well-connected acquaintance, she faces severe setbacks. She then receives an opportunity to change her life when she is identified as Choi Eun-seok, the long-lost daughter of Haeseong Group. Though she accepts this new status out of desperation, she soon encounters new challenges.

- Lee Tae-hwan as Sunwoo Hyuk

He is Seo Ji-an's high school friend. With a major in interior design, he runs a DIY furniture shopping mall. He has a cheerful and feisty personality, but he also has a cranky side and his likes and dislikes are very clear. Ever since he fell in love with Ji-an at first sight in high school, he has had a crush on her. He does not realize that Ji-soo, who has a crush on him, is Ji-an's twin sister.

- Seo Eun-soo as Seo Ji-soo

Ji-an's twin sister. After graduating from vocational college, she has been making a living as a part-timer for years. She is without a worry in the world. Since she loves bread so much, she gets a job at a local bakery. Without knowing the relationship between Ji-an and Hyuk, she has a secret crush on Hyuk. When her twin sister enters the chaebol family, she learns the secret behind her birth and becomes confused as she is the real Choi Eun-seok.

=== Supporting ===
==== Seo Ji-an's family ====
- Chun Ho-jin as Seo Tae-soo, the twins' father

Tae-soo has been the breadwinner for his family for his entire life. He previously had a successful life as a self-made businessman, but after going bankrupt some years earlier, he has been working as a day laborer but struggles with discrimination due to his older age and his wife being vocal about her shame at his plight.

- Kim Hye-ok as Yang Mi-jung, the twins' mother

She lived as a housewife with love and dedication to her family. She constantly gives her husband Tae-soo a hard time due to his having gone bankrupt - she is upset and disappointed, and she is terribly worried about her children and how they struggle to survive. Reality makes her a pessimist. She prays that her daughter Ji-an, who enters a chaebol family, does not end up like her.

- Lee Tae-sung as Seo Ji-tae, the twins' older brother

Ji-tae is the eldest of Tae-soo's four children. Having graduated from university abroad, he is the envy of his younger siblings as he has a full-time job and a steady girlfriend. Burdened with having to help pay off his father's debt, he hides his own struggles from his family and will do anything for them, including sacrificing his own happiness.

- Shin Hyun-soo as Seo Ji-ho, the twins' younger brother

Ji-ho is the youngest of Tae-soo's four children. At the beginning of the series, he was a high school student preparing for the college entrance exam and worked part-time to save up for his college tuition. Cheerful and happy-go-lucky by nature, he is doted on by his family and is fiercely protective of his siblings.

==== Choi Do-kyung's family ====
- Jeon No-min as Choi Jae-sung, Do-kyung's father. He and Myung-hee were university sweethearts and he married her even after finding out about her background as a chaebol heiress. Although he works for his in-laws' company, he feels suffocated and despises the cold mannerisms and lack of personal relationships between his in-laws.
- Na Young-hee as Noh Myung-hee, mother of Do-kyung & Seo-hyun and elder daughter of Noh Yang-ho. She is portrayed in the story unsympathetically as a rather self-centered lady, possibly because of her upbringing and manipulation of her overbearing father. She tends to be uncaring towards others, especially people of inferior wealth and influence in comparison with her.
- Lee Da-in as Choi Seo-hyun, Do-kyung's younger sister. Although appearing to be a typical "golden child", she hides a more rebellious side of her from her brother and parents and wishes to explore the world outside of her family's bubble of wealthy friends and connections. She feels left out when her parents, especially the mother, fuss so much over the return of her missing sister.
- Shin Hye-sun / Seo Eun-soo as Choi Eun-seok, long lost daughter of Haesung Group. Seo Ji-an enters the Haesung Group chaebol family as Choi Eun-seok. But later it is revealed that Seo Ji-soo, fraternal twin of Ji-an may be the actual Choi Eun-seok.

==== Haesung Group ====
- Kim Byung-ki as Noh Yang-ho, the family patriarch and former chairman of Haesung Group
- Jeon Soo-kyeong as Noh Jin-hee, Noh Yang-ho's younger daughter
- Yoo Ha-bok as Jung Myung-soo, Noh Jin-Hee's husband
- Seo Kyung-hwa as Min Deul-lae, Choi family's household manager
- Wi Ha-joon as Ryu Jae-shin, Choi Seo-hyun's former driver

==== Extended ====
- Jung So-young as Sunwoo Hee, Sunwoo Hyuk's elder sister
- Choi Gwi-hwa as Kang Nam-goo, Seo Ji-soo's boss
- Kwon Hyuk-poong as Sunwoo Seok, Sunwoo Hyuk & Hee's father
- Park Joo-hee as Lee Soo-ah, Seo Ji-tae's longtime lover and then wife
- Lee Jong-nam as Shin Hae-ja, Yang Mi-jung's friend
- Lee Gyu-bok as Yoo secretary
- Kim Sung-hoon as Lee Yong-kook
- Baek Seo-yi as Yoon Ha-jung, Seo Ji-an's frenemy
- Kim Sa-kwan as Kim Ki-jae
- Shin Min-kyung as departmental student representative
- Yoo In-young as Jang So-ra, Choi Do-kyung's fiancée.
- Gong Min-jeung as Song Mi-heon

== Original soundtrack ==
Track listing for My Golden Life OST
No.	Title	Artist	Length
1.	"Beautiful Girl"	Sosimboys (소심한 오빠들)	3:20
2.	"나 그거하나봐 연애" (I Think I'm in Love)	ROO (루)	3:56
3.	"어쩌면 내일은" (Maybe Tomorrow)	Dream Girl (동경소녀)	3:29
4.	"바람이 불어와" (The Wind Blows)	Park Sun-ye (박선예)	3:54
5.	"머물러" (Please Stay)	Lee Ki-chan	3:55
6.	"너에게 닿기를" (I Hope It Reaches You)	Siwoo (시우)	3:31
7.	"Love You"	Chae Min (채민)	3:27
8.	"Golden My Life Title"	Kim Ji-soo (김지수)	1:49
9.	"Stay with You"	Kim Ji-soo (김지수)	2:36
10.	"Candy"	Park Young-ik 박영익	2:06
11.	"Lonely Load"	Kim Ji-soo (김지수)	2:54
12.	"A Faint Heart"	Park Min-ji (박민지)	2:35
13.	"Lovely Whisper"	Kim Ji-soo (김지수)	2:09
14.	"Doubtful"	Heo Sang-eun (허상은)	1:52
15.	"Show Time"	Park Young-ik 박영익	1:50
16.	"Going Back"	Kim Ji-soo (김지수)	2:06
17.	"My Heart is Beating"	Park Ji-min (박민지)	2:37
18.	"Something to You"	Kim Ji-soo (김지수)	2:20
19.	"Who Are You"	Kim Ji-soo (김지수)	2:25
20.	"Golden World"	Kim Ji-soo (김지수); Park Young-ik 박영익	2:38
Total length:			55:29

== Reception ==
The drama became one of the fastest-growing in ratings among KBS2 TV series in the same timeslot, starting with 19.7% for the first episode and surpassing 30% mark (30.9%) in 8 episodes. It went on to become the fastest to reach the National Drama level of 40% rating (41.2% in 30 episodes) among KBS2 TV series in the same timeslot.

The drama was praised as an atypical family drama, avoiding cliches such as family conflicts and typical "Cinderella stories" with "happily-ever-after" endings, instead focusing on pursuing personal happiness based on one's own decision. There was more thorough characterization and focus on characters' emotions and personal journeys, which were praised by viewers as making the characters much more relatable. The series has been noted for highlighting current social issues in South Korean society, such as the breaking down of the traditional family unit in more recent times, discrimination against older and lower to middle-income workers and the struggles faced by the "N-po" generation.

Because of its popularity, it was also the first KBS2 drama in the same timeslot to have a special episode. The 2½-hour program consisted of behind-the-scenes footage, cast and staff interviews, director's cuts of the first 10 episodes. It aired on October 4, 2017, from 3:25 to 6 pm (KST) during the Chuseok national holiday period.

=== Viewership ===
My Golden Life : South Korea viewers per episode (millions)

Episodes	Episode number												
Episodes	1	2	3	4	5	6	7	8	9	10	11	12	13
1–13	3.837	4.251	3.853	4.902	4.358	5.046	4.214	5.205	4.106	5.115	4.552	5.326	4.751
14–26	5.704	5.057	6.157	4.939	6.131	5.465	6.420	5.799	6.884	5.969	6.736	6.091	7.148
27–39	6.206	N/A	6.369	7.450	6.285	7.343	6.172	6.905	6.872	7.891	6.991	7.886	6.606
40–52	7.850	7.053	8.245	7.100	8.366	7.734	6.468	7.410	5.349	6.658	8.037	6.700	8.156

Source: Audience measurement performed nationwide by Nielsen Media Research.

Average TV viewership ratings
Episode	Original broadcast date	Average audience share			
Episode	Original broadcast date	TNmS		Nielsen Korea	
Episode	Original broadcast date	Nationwide	Seoul	Nationwide	Seoul
1	September 2, 2017	20.7% (1st)	17.5% (4th)	19.7% (1st)	19.5% (3rd)
2	September 3, 2017	22.5% (1st)	20.0% (1st)	23.7% (1st)	23.5% (1st)
3	September 9, 2017	23.2% (1st)	19.4% (2nd)	22.4% (1st)	22.2% (2nd)
4	September 10, 2017	29.6% (1st)	26.0% (1st)	28.4% (1st)	28.2% (1st)
5	September 16, 2017	25.2% (1st)	20.9% (1st)	25.3% (1st)	24.5% (1st)
6	September 17, 2017	28.8% (1st)	24.5% (1st)	29.7% (1st)	29.7% (1st)
7	September 23, 2017	25.8% (1st)	22.0% (2nd)	26.2% (1st)	25.6% (1st)
8	September 24, 2017	31.2% (1st)	28.4% (1st)	30.9% (1st)	30.5% (1st)
9	September 30, 2017	24.4% (1st)	21.0% (3rd)	25.4% (1st)	24.3% (1st)
10	October 1, 2017	28.1% (1st)	23.9% (1st)	29.6% (1st)	29.8% (1st)
11	October 7, 2017	24.8% (1st)	20.3% (3rd)	27.2% (1st)	26.7% (1st)
12	October 8, 2017	30.3% (1st)	27.4% (1st)	30.9% (1st)	30.1% (1st)
13	October 14, 2017	27.9% (1st)	23.3% (3rd)	27.4% (1st)	26.5% (1st)
14	October 15, 2017	31.2% (1st)	27.5% (1st)	32.4% (1st)	31.7% (1st)
15	October 21, 2017	30.2% (1st)	27.8% (1st)	29.7% (1st)	29.5% (1st)
16	October 22, 2017	34.2% (1st)	31.4% (1st)	35.0% (1st)	34.8% (1st)
17	October 28, 2017	30.3% (1st)	26.8% (1st)	30.2% (1st)	30.2% (1st)
18	October 29, 2017	34.2% (1st)	30.3% (1st)	34.5% (1st)	34.2% (1st)
19	November 4, 2017	31.1% (1st)	27.1% (1st)	31.2% (1st)	30.8% (1st)
20	November 5, 2017	35.5% (1st)	31.3% (1st)	36.0% (1st)	36.0% (1st)
21	November 11, 2017	32.2% (1st)	30.1% (1st)	32.3% (1st)	32.1% (1st)
22	November 12, 2017	37.1% (1st)	34.0% (1st)	37.9% (1st)	36.6% (1st)
23	November 18, 2017	31.4% (1st)	27.9% (1st)	35.0% (1st)	34.6% (1st)
24	November 19, 2017	36.3% (1st)	33.6% (1st)	37.7% (1st)	37.5% (1st)
25	November 25, 2017	30.7% (1st)	27.0% (1st)	34.7% (1st)	34.3% (1st)
26	November 26, 2017	35.9% (1st)	32.1% (1st)	39.0% (1st)	38.6% (1st)
27	December 2, 2017	32.7% (1st)	29.9% (1st)	35.7% (1st)	35.4% (1st)
28	December 3, 2017	38.7% (1st)	35.7% (1st)	38.8% (1st)	38.9% (1st)
29	December 9, 2017	32.2% (1st)	29.0% (1st)	35.6% (1st)	35.5% (1st)
30	December 10, 2017	40.2% (1st)	36.3% (1st)	41.2% (1st)	40.8% (1st)
31	December 16, 2017	34.2% (1st)	30.7% (1st)	35.7% (1st)	34.7% (1st)
32	December 17, 2017	39.6% (1st)	35.5% (1st)	40.7% (1st)	40.1% (1st)
33	December 23, 2017	32.8% (1st)	29.1% (1st)	34.7% (1st)	33.1% (1st)
34	December 24, 2017	35.9% (1st)	31.6% (1st)	37.8% (1st)	36.9% (1st)
35	January 6, 2018	37.3% (1st)	34.4% (1st)	37.6% (1st)	37.2% (1st)
36	January 7, 2018	42.3% (1st)	38.2% (1st)	42.8% (1st)	42.5% (1st)
37	January 13, 2018	36.4% (1st)	32.5% (1st)	37.8% (1st)	37.9% (1st)
38	January 14, 2018	39.6% (1st)	35.7% (1st)	43.2% (1st)	42.9% (1st)
39	January 20, 2018	35.3% (1st)	31.9% (1st)	36.8% (1st)	35.4% (1st)
40	January 21, 2018	41.7% (1st)	37.0% (1st)	41.9% (1st)	41.2% (1st)
41	January 27, 2018	37.5% (1st)	34.1% (1st)	38.8% (1st)	39.3% (1st)
42	January 28, 2018	42.5% (1st)	38.9% (1st)	44.2% (1st)	44.6% (1st)
43	February 3, 2018	39.6% (1st)	35.8% (1st)	40.3% (1st)	40.5% (1st)
44	February 4, 2018	43.9% (1st)	40.4% (1st)	44.6% (1st)	44.1% (1st)
45	February 11, 2018	39.9% (1st)	36.4% (1st)	41.9% (1st)	41.5% (1st)
46	February 17, 2018	30.0% (1st)	26.1% (1st)	34.7% (1st)	34.8% (1st)
47	February 18, 2018	35.1% (1st)	31.3% (1st)	38.7% (1st)	38.9% (1st)
48	February 25, 2018	30.7% (1st)	27.2% (1st)	29.3% (1st)	28.8% (1st)
49	March 3, 2018	41.2% (1st)	36.7% (1st)	38.1% (1st)	37.6% (1st)
50	March 4, 2018	45.8% (1st)	41.9% (1st)	43.9% (1st)	43.0% (1st)
51	March 10, 2018	39.4% (1st)	35.0% (1st)	38.1% (1st)	36.7% (1st)
52	March 11, 2018	47.5% (1st)	43.7% (1st)	45.1% (1st)	44.3% (1st)
Average		34.0%	30.2%	34.8%	34.4%
Chuseok Special I	October 4, 2017	1.9% (NR)	—N/a	2.2% (NR)	—N/a
Chuseok Special II	October 4, 2017	3.4% (NR)	—N/a	3.4% (NR)	—N/a
Behind the Scenes Special I	December 30, 2017	23.4% (1st)	20.2% (1st)	22.1% (1st)	21.5% (1st)
Behind the Scenes Special II	December 31, 2017	19.9% (1st)	17.1% (1st)	17.5% (1st)	17.3% (1st)
In the table above, the blue numbers represent the lowest ratings and the red numbers represent the highest ratings.; KBS2 aired two special episodes on October 4, 2017 from 15:25 onwards, to celebrate Chuseok holiday.; Surpassed 40% ratings starting from the 30th episode, became a new "National Drama".; On January 11, 2018, extension of 2 episodes was confirmed and thus making up to total of 52 episodes.; Episodes 46-47 aired at 22:00 due to the coverage of the 2018 Winter Olympics.; Episode 48 did not air on February 24 due to the coverage of the 2018 Winter Olympics.

=== Awards and nominations ===
Year	Award	Category	Recipient	Result	Ref.
2017	31st KBS Drama Awards	Grand Prize (Daesang)	Chun Ho-jin	Won	
2017	31st KBS Drama Awards	Top Excellence Award, Actor	Chun Ho-jin	Nominated	
2017	31st KBS Drama Awards	Top Excellence Award, Actress	Shin Hye-sun	Nominated	
2017	31st KBS Drama Awards	Excellence Award, Actress in a Serial Drama	Shin Hye-sun	Won	
2017	31st KBS Drama Awards	Excellence Award, Actress in a Serial Drama	Kim Hye-ok	Nominated	
2017	31st KBS Drama Awards	Excellence Award, Actor in a Serial Drama	Park Si-hoo	Won	
2017	31st KBS Drama Awards	Excellence Award, Actor in a Serial Drama	Chun Ho-jin	Nominated	
2017	31st KBS Drama Awards	Best New Actor	Lee Tae-hwan	Nominated	
2017	31st KBS Drama Awards	Best New Actress	Seo Eun-soo	Nominated	
2017	31st KBS Drama Awards	Netizen Award	Shin Hye-sun	Nominated	
2017	31st KBS Drama Awards	Best Writer	So Hyun-kyung	Won	
2017	31st KBS Drama Awards	Best Couple Award	Park Si-hoo and Shin Hye-sun	Won	
2018	54th Baeksang Arts Awards	Best Drama	My Golden Life	Nominated	
2018	54th Baeksang Arts Awards	Best Actor	Chun Ho-jin	Nominated	
2018	54th Baeksang Arts Awards	Best Actress	Shin Hye-sun	Nominated	
2018	54th Baeksang Arts Awards	Best Supporting Actress	Na Young-hee	Nominated	
2018	54th Baeksang Arts Awards	Best New Actress	Seo Eun-soo	Nominated	
2018	11th Korea Drama Awards	Grand Prize (Daesang)	Chun Ho-jin	Nominated	
2018	11th Korea Drama Awards	Best Drama	My Golden Life	Nominated	
2018	11th Korea Drama Awards	Best Screenplay	So Hyun-kyung	Nominated	
2018	11th Korea Drama Awards	Top Excellence Award, Actor	Park Si-hoo	Nominated	
2018	11th Korea Drama Awards	Top Excellence Award, Actress	Shin Hye-sun	Nominated	
2018	11th Korea Drama Awards	Best New Actress	Seo Eun-soo	Won	
2018	6th APAN Star Awards	Top Excellence Award, Actor in a Serial Drama	Park Si-hoo	Nominated	
2018	6th APAN Star Awards	Top Excellence Award, Actress in a Serial Drama	Shin Hye-sun	Won	
2018	2nd The Seoul Awards	Best Drama	My Golden Life	Nominated	
2018	2nd The Seoul Awards	Best Actress	Shin Hye-sun	Nominated	
