= Doona! =

2023 South Korean Netflix series

- Promotional poster
- Hangul: 이두나!
- Lit.: Lee Doo-na!
- RR: I Duna!
- MR: I Tuna!
- Genre: Romance
- Created by: Song Kyung-hwa
- Based on: The Girl Downstairs by Min Song-ah
- Developed by: Studio Dragon
- Written by: Jang Yoo-ha
- Directed by: Lee Jeong-hyo
- Starring: Bae Suzy; Yang Se-jong
- Music by: Nam Hye-seung
- Country of origin: South Korea
- Original language: Korean
- No. of episodes: 9

Production
- Executive producers: Hong Won-ju (CP); So Jae-hyun; Park Ju-yeon
- Producers: Kim Young-gyu; Lee Ki-hyuk; Jang Young-woo; Kwon Mi-kyung; Park Gyu-won
- Editor: Lee Hyeon-mi
- Running time: 40–50 minutes
- Production companies: Showrunners; Studio Dragon; Studio N

Original release
- Network: Netflix
- Release: October 20, 2023

Doo-na! (Korean: 이두나!) is a 2023 South Korean romance television series starring Bae Suzy and Yang Se-jong, based on the Naver webtoon The Girl Downstairs by Min Song-ah. It was released on Netflix on October 20, 2023.

== Synopsis ==
A college student, Won-jun, becomes roommates with Doo-na, a retired K-pop idol who leaves behind her glamorous days.

== Cast ==
=== Main ===
- Bae Suzy as Lee Doo-na

The main vocalist and center of the girl group Dream Sweet (Korean: 드림스윗; RR: Deurimseuwit), who announces her sudden retirement and stays in a share house in a college town.

- Yang Se-jong as Lee Won-jun

A college student and math genius who desires to live a normal life

=== Supporting ===
- Ha Young as Kim Jin-joo

Won-jun's high school crush.

- Kim Do-wan as Goo Jeong-hoon

Won-jun's housemate.

- Park Se-wan as Choi I-ra

Won jun's childhood friend.

- Kim Min-ho as Seo Yun-taek

Won-jun's housemate.

- Kim Sun-young as Doo-na's mother
- Kim Yoo-mi as the representative of Doo-na's agency
- Baek Ji-hye as Eun-joo

=== Special appearances ===
- Lee Jin-wook as Park In-wook, a person from Doo-na's past
- Kwon Han-sol as Song Tae-rim
- Go Ah-sung as Im Ha-yeon, a member of Dream Sweet
- Simeez and Rian of Lachica as members of Dream Sweet
- Kim Hyun-mok as stalker (ep.3)

== Production ==
Filming started around July 2022 and was completed on February 20, 2023.

== Reception ==
On the review aggregator website Rotten Tomatoes, 83% of 6 critics' reviews are positive, with an average rating of 6.2/10.

Lee Min-ji of Newsen felt that "what stands out the most in this drama is the complexity of Lee Doo-na's character", describing her as "eccentric and outspoken, but also with a dark side", and appreciated Suzy's acting, who "played her complex sides with stability". Jeong Seung-min of MHN Sports appreciated how Suzy expressed the change that occurred in Doo-na after opening her heart to Won-jun and the chemistry between the lead actors, but also wrote that the series "can be childish" and "feels like a typical youth drama or a web drama depicting campus life". Choi Ha-na of TVDaily criticized the drama, stating that it has a predictable plot as it only focuses on the romance between Doo-na and Won-jun (while in the webtoon he is torn between her, I-ra, and Jin-joo) and the supporting characters have no function other than that of "bridesmaids" to the leads. However, she praised Suzy's acting, who "played every moment of Doo-na with just the right amount of intensity, never overdoing it or disappointing", considering it a good enough reason to watch the series. Journalist Kim Jun-mo of OhmyNews called it "boring" as "other than Suzy, the show lacks any memorable parts".

Joel Keller of Decider wrote that "Doona! is a pretty standard romantic K-drama in a lot of ways, but the added dynamic of a regular guy and a depressed K-pop star falling for each other makes things just a little more interesting". Joanne Soh gave the show 3 out of 5 stars in her review for The Straits Times, identifying Doo-na and Won-jun's chemistry, the cinematography, and the show's treatment of the protagonist's mental health issues as the show's strengths, but found it to be "oddly slow-moving" compared to the webtoon. For Geoffrey Bunting of Rolling Stone, Doona! "[weaves] a complicated yet relatable narrative about loss and love. On the surface, it feels at home with contemporary clichéd dramas yet represents a startling departure." He appreciated how it "builds a community around Lee Doo-na to pull her out of isolation and help her rediscover herself", and called it "a show that's really about letting go — shedding old lives, past loves, and former selves" that "deftly navigates the complexities of grief and, though wrapped in K-drama clichés, is surprisingly human". The series hit the No. 1 spot on Netflix's top 10 TV programs in Singapore.
