= 6th APAN Star Awards =

2018 edition of award ceremony

- Date: October 13, 2018
- Site: Kyunghee University
- Hosted by: Kim Seung-woo

Highlights
- Best Drama Serial: Mr. Sunshine
- Most awards: Mr. Sunshine (4)

Television coverage
- Network: tvN

The 6th APAN Star Awards ceremony was held on October 13, 2018 at Kyunghee University Peace Hall, Seoul, hosted by Kim Seung-woo. First held in 2012, the annual awards ceremony recognizes the excellence in South Korea's television. Nominees were selected from 93 Korean dramas that aired on broadcasting networks MBC, KBS and SBS and cable channels tvN, jtbc, OCN, MBN and TV Chosun, from September 2, 2017 to September 2, 2018.

The highest honor of the ceremony, Grand Prize (Daesang), was awarded to the actor Lee Byung-hun of the drama series Mr. Sunshine.

== Nominations and winners ==
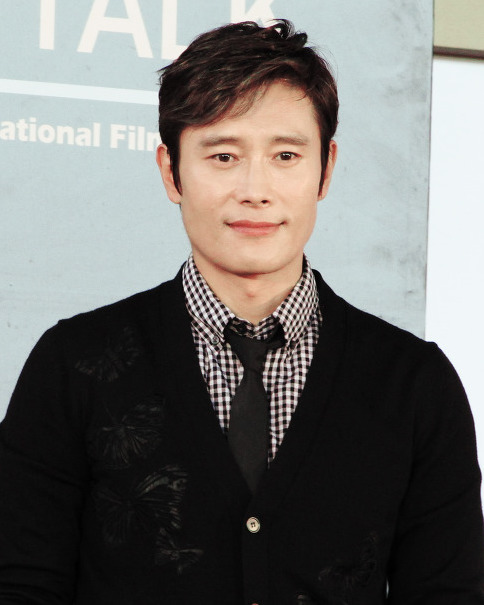
Lee Byung-hun — Grand Prize (Daesang) winner for Mr. Sunshine

Winners are listed first, highlighted in boldface, and indicated with a dagger (†).

**Grand Prize (Daesang)**: **Lee Byung-hun** – **Mr. Sunshine** †; Kim Nam-joo – Misty; Son Ye-jin – Something in the Rain; Lee Sun-kyun – My Mister; Cho Seung-woo – Life
**Top Excellence Award, Actor in a Miniseries**: **Park Seo-joon** – **What's Wrong with Secretary Kim** †; Lee Dong-wook – Life; Lee Jong-suk – While You Were Sleeping; Jung Kyung-ho – Life on Mars; Jo Jung-suk – Two Cops	**Top Excellence Award, Actress in a Miniseries**: **Lee Ji-eun (IU)** – **My Mister** †; Kim Sun-a – Should We Kiss First?; Lee Bo-young – Mother; Jung Ryeo-won – Witch at Court; Jung Yu-mi – Live
**Top Excellence Award, Actor in a Serial Drama**: **Lee Sang-woo** – **Marry Me Now** †; Park Si-hoo – My Golden Life; Lee Sung-jae – Goodbye to Goodbye; Jang Hyuk – Money Flower; Jung Woong-in – Goodbye to Goodbye	**Top Excellence Award, Actress in a Serial Drama**: **Shin Hye-sun** – **My Golden Life** †; Do Ji-won – Bravo My Life; Lee Yoo-ri – Hide and Seek; Chae Shi-ra – Goodbye to Goodbye; Han Ji-hye – Marry Me Now
**Excellence Award, Actor in a Miniseries**: **Jung Hae-in** – **Something in the Rain** †; Yoo Yeon-seok – Mr. Sunshine; Yoon Shi-yoon – Grand Prince; Park Hae-soo – Prison Playbook; Park Hyung-sik – Suits	**Excellence Award, Actress in a Miniseries**: **Go Ah-sung** – **Life on Mars** †; Go Ara – Ms. Hammurabi; Park Min-young – What's Wrong with Secretary Kim; Bae Suzy – While You Were Sleeping; Jang Na-ra – Confession Couple
**Excellence Award, Actor in a Serial Drama**: **Jang Seung-jo** – **Money Flower** †; Kim Kang-woo – My Contracted Husband, Mr. Oh; Kim Ji-hoon – The Rich Son; Song Chang-eui – The Secret of My Love; Jo Hyun-jae – Let Me Introduce Her	**Excellence Award, Actress in a Serial Drama**: **Jo Bo-ah** – **Goodbye to Goodbye** †; Nam Sang-mi – Let Me Introduce Her; Park Se-young – Money Flower; Wang Bit-na – Mysterious Personal Shopper; Uee – My Contracted Husband, Mr. Oh
**Best Supporting Actor**: **Park Ho-san** – **Prison Playbook** †; **Yoo Jae-myung** – **Life** †; Bae Seong-woo – Live; Choi Gwi-hwa – Suits; Huh Joon-ho – Come and Hug Me	**Best Supporting Actress**: **Kim Min-jung** – **Mr. Sunshine** †; **Jang So-yeon** – **Something in the Rain** †; Ko Sung-hee – Mother; Ra Mi-ran – The Miracle We Met; Seo Jeong-yeon – Come and Hug Me
**Best New Actor**: **Yang Se-jong** – **Temperature of Love** †; **Jang Ki-yong** – **My Mister** †; Kim Myung-soo – Ms. Hammurabi; Kim Min-jae – Tempted; Woo Do-hwan – Mad Dog	**Best New Actress**: **Kim Tae-ri** – **Mr. Sunshine** †; **Won Jin-ah** – **Rain or Shine** †; Lee Sun-bin – Sketch; Lee Yoo-young – Your Honor; Jin Ki-joo – Misty
**Best Production Director**: **Kim Won-seok** – **My Mister** †	**Best Screenwriter**: **Lee Soo-yeon** – **Life** †
**Drama of the Year**: **Mr. Sunshine** †	**OST Award**: **Song Dong-woon** †
**K-Star Award, Actor**: **Jung Hae-in** – **Something in the Rain** †; Park Seo-joon – What's Wrong with Secretary Kim; Yang Se-jong – Temperature of Love; Lee Dong-wook – Life; Lee Byung-hun – Mr. Sunshine; Lee Jong-suk – While You Were Sleeping	**K-Star Award, Actress**: **Park Min-young** – **What's Wrong with Secretary Kim** †; Kim Min-jung – Mr. Sunshine; Kim Tae-ri – Mr. Sunshine; Bae Suzy – While You Were Sleeping; Son Ye-jin – Something in the Rain; Lee Ji-eun – My Mister
**Global Star Award**: **Park Hae-jin** †	**Best Manager**: **Bae Sung – HM Entertainment** †
