= Should We Kiss First? =

2018 South Korean TV series

- Promotional poster
- Also known as: Shall We Kiss First?
- Hangul: 키스 먼저 할까요?
- RR: Kiseu meonjeo halkkayo?
- MR: K'isŭ mŏnjŏ halkkayo?
- Genre: Romance; Melodrama
- Written by: Bae Yoo-mi
- Directed by: Son Jeong-hyun
- Starring: Kam Woo-sung; Kim Sun-a; Oh Ji-ho; Park Si-yeon
- Country of origin: South Korea
- Original language: Korean
- No. of episodes: 40 (Note: In order to circumvent Korean laws that prevent commercial breaks in the middle of an episode, what would previously have been aired as single 70 minute episodes are now being repackaged as two 35 minute episodes, with two episodes being shown each night with a commercial break between the two.)

Production
- Executive producers: Lee Hun-hee; Kim Dong-joon
- Camera setup: Single-camera
- Running time: 35 minutes
- Production company: SM C&C

Original release
- Network: SBS TV
- Release: February 20 – April 24, 2018

Should We Kiss First? (Korean: 키스 먼저 할까요?) is a 2018 South Korean television series starring Kam Woo-sung, Kim Sun-a, Oh Ji-ho and Park Si-yeon. It aired on SBS TV from February 20 to April 24, 2018, for 40 episodes.

The series was initially scheduled to premiere on February 5, 2018, but was moved to the 20th, with four consecutive broadcasts, due to live broadcast of 2018 Pyeongchang Winter Olympics.

== Synopsis ==
The story of a middle-aged man and woman who have given up any dreams of a passionate romance, but are both afraid of living and dying alone.

== Cast ==
=== Main ===
- Kam Woo-sung as Son Moo-han, a bachelor who works at a leading advertisement company as a production director.
- Kim Sun-a as An Soon-jin, a flight attendant who has lost faith in love after losing her daughter.
- Oh Ji-ho as Eun Kyung-soo, Soon-jin's ex-husband.
- Park Si-yeon as Baek Ji-min, Kyung-soo's wife.

=== Supporting ===
- Han Go-eun as Kang Suk-young
- Kim Sung-soo as Hwang In-woo
- Ye Ji-won as Lee Mi-ra
- Jo Ah-in as Eun Ji-soo
- Sung Byung-sook as Kang Geum-soon
- Lee Young-eun as An Hee-jin
- Kang Kyung-hun as Bong Jae-soon
- Kim Ki-bang as Lee Chung-geol
- Jung Da-bin as Son Yi-deun
- Ki Do-hoon as Yeo Ha-min
- Bae Da-bin as Son I-deun
- Son Woo-hyuk as Kim Hyung-joon
- Choi Hyo-eun as Kim Si-ra

== Original soundtrack ==
Should We Kiss First? OST

Soundtrack album by Various artists
- Genre: Soundtrack
- Language: Korean
- Labels: S.M.; IRIVER
- Producer: Lee Soo-man (executive)

=== Part 1 ===
Released on February 20, 2018
No.	Title	Artist	Length
1.	"Ordinary Goodbye" (안녕이라는 흔한 인사)	Kwon Jin-won	2:59
2.	"Is It Love?" (사랑일까요?)	Luna	4:00
Total length:			6:59

=== Part 2 ===
Released on March 6, 2018
No.	Title	Artist	Length
1.	"Perfect"	Lee Jinsol (April)	3:26
2.	"Perfect" (Inst.)		3:26
Total length:			6:52

=== Part 3 ===
Released on March 20, 2018
No.	Title	Artist	Length
1.	"Every Day, Every Moment (모든 날, 모든 순간)"	Paul Kim	3:31
2.	"Every Day, Every Moment (모든 날, 모든 순간)" (Inst.)		3:31
Total length:			7:02

=== Part 4 ===
Released on March 27, 2018
No.	Title	Artist	Length
1.	"Monologue (독백)"	Wheesung	3:44
2.	"Monologue (독백)" (Inst.)		3:44
Total length:			7:28

=== Part 5 ===
Released on April 2, 2018
No.	Title	Artist	Length
1.	"On My Own (혼자 하는 일)"	Yesung (Super Junior)	3:45
2.	"On My Own (혼자 하는 일)" (Inst.)		3:45
Total length:			7:30

=== Part 6 ===
Released on April 2, 2018
No.	Title	Artist	Length
1.	"Coincidence (우연처럼)"	Jung-in	3:25
2.	"Coincidence (우연처럼)" (Inst.)		3:25
Total length:			6:50

=== Commercial performance ===
Certifications for "Every day, Every Moment"
Region	Certification	Certified units/sales
South Korea (KMCA)	2× Platinum	5,000,000^{*}
Streaming
South Korea (KMCA)	3× Platinum	300,000,000^{†}
^{*} Sales figures based on certification alone.^{†} Streaming-only figures based on certification alone.

== Viewership ==
Should We Kiss First? : South Korea viewers per episode (millions)

Episodes	Episode number									
Episodes	1	2	3	4	5	6	7	8	9	10
1–10	1.503	1.875	1.875	1.711	1.542	1.919	1.668	2.195	1.504	1.969
11–20	1.533	2.032	1.385	1.635	1.280	1.693	1.443	1.856	1.456	1.825
21–30	1.552	1.919	1.424	1.779	1.324	1.631	1.300	1.655	1.181	1.430
31–40	1.182	1.440	1.182	1.288	1.325	1.529	1.084	1.166	1.262	1.465

Source: Audience measurement performed nationwide by Nielsen Korea.

Ep.	Original broadcast date	Epilogue	Average audience share			
Ep.	Original broadcast date	Epilogue	TNmS		Nielsen Korea	
Ep.	Original broadcast date	Epilogue	Nationwide	Seoul	Nationwide	Seoul
1	February 20, 2018 (Note: Due to the 2018 Winter Olympics, the 2 episodes set to air on February 19, 2018, were pushed back and will air together with episode 3 and 4 on the following day.)	Something He Treasured, Something She Forgot (그는 간직하고 그녀는 잊었던 것)	7.8% (19th)	8.7%	8.1% (14th)	9.0% (12th)
2	February 20, 2018	Something He Treasured, Something She Forgot (그는 간직하고 그녀는 잊었던 것)	10.0% (12th)	11.4%	10.5% (7th)	11.9% (5th)
3	February 20, 2018	Something He Treasured, Something She Forgot (그는 간직하고 그녀는 잊었던 것)	9.4% (13th)	10.5%	9.9% (9th)	11.0% (7th)
4	February 20, 2018	Something He Treasured, Something She Forgot (그는 간직하고 그녀는 잊었던 것)	8.6% (16th)	9.4%	9.1% (11th)	9.9% (9th)
5	February 26, 2018	Something He Treasured, Something She Forgot (그는 간직하고 그녀는 잊었던 것)	8.5% (18th)	9.2%	9.7% (8th)	10.4% (7th)
6	February 26, 2018	Something He Treasured, Something She Forgot (그는 간직하고 그녀는 잊었던 것)	10.9% (8th)	11.6%	11.8% (5th)	12.5% (4th)
7	February 27, 2018	Something He Treasured, Something She Forgot (그는 간직하고 그녀는 잊었던 것)	8.9% (13th)	10.0%	9.3% (8th)	10.3% (5th)
8	February 27, 2018	Something He Treasured, Something She Forgot (그는 간직하고 그녀는 잊었던 것)	11.6% (6th)	12.8%	12.4% (4th)	13.6% (3rd)
9	March 5, 2018	Something He Treasured, Something She Forgot (그는 간직하고 그녀는 잊었던 것)	8.6% (18th)	9.2%	9.3% (11th)	10.0% (9th)
10	March 5, 2018	Something He Treasured, Something She Forgot (그는 간직하고 그녀는 잊었던 것)	11.0% (9th)	11.6%	12.3% (5th)	12.9% (3rd)
11	March 6, 2018	You Cannot Forget, What You Cherish (간직한 것은 잊혀지지 않는다)	9.4% (12th)	10.5%	9.5% (7th)	10.6% (5th)
12	March 6, 2018	You Cannot Forget, What You Cherish (간직한 것은 잊혀지지 않는다)	11.3% (6th)	12.8%	12.5% (4th)	14.0% (3rd)
13	March 12, 2018	You Cannot Forget, What You Cherish (간직한 것은 잊혀지지 않는다)	8.6% (15th)	9.7%	8.5% (10th)	9.6% (6th)
14	March 12, 2018	You Cannot Forget, What You Cherish (간직한 것은 잊혀지지 않는다)	9.9% (10th)	11.0%	10.4% (7th)	11.4% (4th)
15	March 13, 2018	You Cannot Forget, What You Cherish (간직한 것은 잊혀지지 않는다)	7.7% (16th)	8.4%	8.5% (8th)	9.3% (6th)
16	March 13, 2018	You Cannot Forget, What You Cherish (간직한 것은 잊혀지지 않는다)	9.2% (12th)	10.4%	10.9% (4th)	12.1% (4th)
17	March 19, 2018	Memory Over Love (기억이란 사랑보다)	7.2% (20th)	8.3%	8.8% (9th)	9.9% (7th)
18	March 19, 2018	Memory Over Love (기억이란 사랑보다)	9.3% (13th)	10.6%	11.1% (6th)	12.4% (4th)
19	March 20, 2018	Behind the Veil of Time (가려진 시간 사이로)	7.5% (16th)	8.7%	9.5% (8th)	10.8% (6th)
20	March 20, 2018	Behind the Veil of Time (가려진 시간 사이로)	10.1% (11th)	11.5%	11.9% (4th)	13.3% (3rd)
21	March 26, 2018	What He Ignored, What She Erased (그는 외면하고, 그녀는 지운 것)	8.3% (15th)	9.5%	9.4% (9th)	10.6% (8th)
22	March 26, 2018	What He Ignored, What She Erased (그는 외면하고, 그녀는 지운 것)	9.5% (11th)	10.4%	11.5% (5th)	12.5% (4th)
23	March 27, 2018	Behind the Veil of Time (가려진 시간 사이로)	7.8% (13th)	9.1%	9.2% (8th)	10.5% (6th)
24	March 27, 2018	Behind the Veil of Time (가려진 시간 사이로)	9.3% (10th)	10.4%	11.6% (4th)	12.7% (4th)
25	April 2, 2018	Behind the Veil of Time (가려진 시간 사이로)	7.4% (18th)	9.1%	8.3% (13th)	9.3% (10th)
26	April 2, 2018	Behind the Veil of Time (가려진 시간 사이로)	8.5% (13th)	10.4%	9.9% (8th)	11.4% (6th)
27	April 3, 2018	Days We Waited For, And the Days That Will Be Erased (기다린 날도 지워질 날도)	7.4% (14th)	8.3%	8.1% (10th)	9.2% (7th)
28	April 3, 2018	Days We Waited For, And the Days That Will Be Erased (기다린 날도 지워질 날도)	9.1% (8th)	10.4%	10.0% (6th)	11.3% (4th)
29	April 9, 2018	Roundabout (에움길)	6.1% (NR)	7.3%	7.9% (14th)	9.1% (13th)
30	April 9, 2018	Roundabout (에움길)	7.1% (19th)	8.2%	9.3% (10th)	10.5% (6th)
31	April 10, 2018	Roundabout (에움길)	7.5% (15th)	8.6%	7.6% (11th)	8.3% (9th)
32	April 10, 2018	Roundabout (에움길)	8.3% (12th)	9.0%	9.3% (8th)	10.1% (7th)
33	April 16, 2018	A Memory Both He and She Will Cherish (그와 그녀가 간직할 기억)	6.5% (NR)	7.7%	7.6% (13th)	8.7% (9th)
34	April 16, 2018	A Memory Both He and She Will Cherish (그와 그녀가 간직할 기억)	6.8% (18th)	7.9%	8.4% (7th)	9.5% (6th)
35	April 17, 2018	Every Day, Every Moment (모든 날, 모든 순간)	6.4% (16th)	7.8%	8.0% (10th)	9.6% (7th)
36	April 17, 2018	Every Day, Every Moment (모든 날, 모든 순간)	7.4% (14th)	8.6%	9.3% (8th)	10.5% (6th)
37	April 23, 2018	Their Remaining Days (그들의 남아있는 나날)	6.4% (NR)	7.5%	6.9% (NR)	7.8% (16th)
38	April 23, 2018	Their Remaining Days (그들의 남아있는 나날)	7.2% (18th)	8.1%	7.6% (17th)	8.5% (10th)
39	April 24, 2018	His and Her Way of Loving (그와 그녀의 사랑법)	7.7% (16th)	8.9%	7.4% (12th)	8.6% (9th)
40	April 24, 2018	His and Her Way of Loving (그와 그녀의 사랑법)	8.5% (13th)	9.6%	9.1% (8th)	10.2% (5th)
Average			8.5%	9.6%	9.5%	10.6%
In the table above, the blue numbers represent the lowest ratings and the red numbers represent the highest ratings.; NR denotes that the drama did not rank in the top 20 daily programs on that date.

== Awards and nominations ==
Award	Category	Recipient	Result	Ref.
54th Baeksang Arts Awards	Best Supporting Actress	Ye Ji-won	Won	
45th Korean Broadcasting Awards	Best Actor	Kam Woo-sung	Won	
11th Korea Drama Awards	Top Excellence Award, Actor	Kam Woo-sung	Won	
6th APAN Star Awards	Top Excellence Award, Actress in a Miniseries	Kim Sun-a	Nominated	
2nd The Seoul Awards	Best Drama	Should We Kiss First	Nominated	
2nd The Seoul Awards	Best Actor	Kam Woo-sung	Nominated	
2nd The Seoul Awards	Best Actress	Kim Sun-a	Nominated	
31st Grimae Awards	Best Actress	Kim Sun-a	Won	
1st MBC Plus X Genie Music Awards	Best OST	Paul Kim	Won	
10th Melon Music Awards	Best OST	Paul Kim	Won	
1st Korea Popular Music Awards	Best OST	Paul Kim	Nominated	
33rd Golden Disc Awards	Best OST	Paul Kim	Won	
20th Mnet Asian Music Awards	Best OST	Paul Kim	Nominated	
26th SBS Drama Awards	Grand Prize (Daesang)	Kam Woo-sung	Won	
26th SBS Drama Awards	Grand Prize (Daesang)	Kim Sun-a	Won	
26th SBS Drama Awards	Top Excellence Award, Actor in a Monday–Tuesday Drama	Kam Woo-sung	Nominated	
26th SBS Drama Awards	Top Excellence Award, Actress in a Monday–Tuesday Drama	Kim Sun-a	Nominated	
26th SBS Drama Awards	Excellence Award, Actor in a Monday–Tuesday Drama	Oh Ji-ho	Nominated	
26th SBS Drama Awards	Excellence Award, Actor in a Monday–Tuesday Drama	Kim Sung-soo	Nominated	
26th SBS Drama Awards	Excellence Award, Actress in a Monday–Tuesday Drama	Park Si-yeon	Nominated	
26th SBS Drama Awards	Best Supporting Actress	Ye Ji-won	Won	
26th SBS Drama Awards	Best Couple	Kam Woo-sung and Kim Sun-ah	Won	
