= Temperature of Love =

2017 South Korean Television series

- Promotional poster
- Also known as: Degree of Love
- Hangul: 사랑의 온도
- Lit.: Love's Temperature
- RR: Sarangui ondo
- MR: Sarangŭi ondo
- Genre: Romance; Melodrama
- Based on: Good Soup Never Picks up the Phone by Ha Myung-hee
- Written by: Ha Myung-hee
- Directed by: Nam Geon
- Starring: Seo Hyun-jin; Yang Se-jong; Kim Jae-wook; Jo Bo-ah
- Country of origin: South Korea
- Original language: Korean
- No. of episodes: 40

Production
- Executive producer: Kim Hee-yeol
- Camera setup: Single-camera
- Running time: 35 minutes
- Production company: Pan Entertainment

Original release
- Network: SBS TV
- Release: September 18 – November 21, 2017

Temperature of Love (Korean: 사랑의 온도) is a 2017 South Korean television series written by Ha Myung-hee and starring Seo Hyun-jin, Yang Se-jong, Kim Jae-wook and Jo Bo-ah. It is based on the screenwriter's own novel titled Good Soup Never Picks up the Phone, released in 2014. It aired on SBS TV from September 18 to November 21, 2017, every Monday and Tuesday at 22:00 (KST) for 40 episodes.

== Synopsis ==
The story of two people who first meet online and soon develop a relationship when they meet in person, but then get separated after choosing different paths for their careers.

== Cast ==
=== Main ===
- Seo Hyun-jin as Lee Hyun-soo / Jane (username), an aspiring screenwriter who spent ten years as an assistant writer.
- Yang Se-jong as On Jung-seon / Good Soup (username), a chef-owner of a Michelin-star restaurant called Good Soup.
- Kim Jae-wook as Park Jung-woo, an entertainment agency CEO and business partner of Jung-seon.
- Jo Bo-ah as Ji Hong-ah, Hyun-soo's friend who was born with a silver spoon in her mouth but aims to be a screenwriter. She has a crush on On Jung-seon.

=== Supporting ===
==== Good Soup staff ====
- Shim Hee-seop as Choi Won-joon, a sous chef.
- Cha In-ha as Kim Ha-sung, a chef.
- Pyo Ji-hoon as Kang Min-ho, a chef.
- Lee Kang-min as Oh Kyung-soo, a chef.
- Chae So-young as Im Soo-jung, a sommelier.

==== People around Lee Hyun-soo ====
- Jung Ae-ri as Park Mi-na, Hyun-soo's mother.
- Sunwoo Jae-duk as Lee Min-jae, Hyun-soo's father.
- Gil Eun-hye as Lee Hyun-yi, Hyun-soo's sister.

==== People around On Jung-seon ====
- Lee Mi-sook as Yoo Yeong-mi, Jung-seon's mother.
- Ahn Nae-sang as On Hae-kyung, Jung-seon's father.

==== Broadcaster's people ====
- Ji Il-joo as Kim Joon-ha
- Song Young-gyu as Min Yi-bok
- Hwang Seok-jeong as Park Eun-sung

==== Extended ====
- Choi Sung-jae as Lee Sung-jae
- Lee Seung-hyung
- Kim Min-young as Kim Ki-da
- Lee Cho-hee as Hwangbo Kyung
- Shim Hee-sub as Choi Won-joon
- Gong Min-jeung as Soo-yeong

=== Special appearance ===
- Ryu Jin as Yoo Hong-jin, Chief Producer.
- Ryu Seung-soo as Shin Ha-rim
- Jang Hyun-sung
- Kim Hwan
- Choi Hwa-jung
- Park Shin-hye as Yoo Hye-jung

== Production ==
- Park Bo-gum and Song Hye-kyo were offered the leading roles of the series in March 2017, both declined.
- Seo Hyun-jin and Yang Se-jong previously worked together on SBS TV series Dr. Romantic (2016).
- The first script reading of the cast was scheduled for July 30, 2017 at the SBS building in Ilsan. Filming started on August 9 in Gangnam, Seoul.

== Original soundtrack ==
Temperature of Love OST

Soundtrack album by Various artists
- Recorded: 2017
- Genre: Soundtrack
- Languages: Korean; English
- Label: Pan Entertainment

=== Part 1 ===
Released on September 25, 2017
No.	Title	Lyrics	Music	Artist	Length
1.	"You Are"	Kim Yoo-kyung	Oh Joon-sung	Seunghee (Oh My Girl)	03:43
2.	"You Are" (Inst.)		Oh Joon-sung		03:43
3.	"Brand New-Day"		Oh Joon-sung		01:49
4.	"Between Us"		Oh Joon-sung		02:02
5.	"Rising Temperature"		Oh Joon-sung		01:55
6.	"Love Step"		Oh Joon-sung		01:57
7.	"Lost Smile"		Oh Joon-sung		02:12
Total length:					17:21

=== Part 2 ===
Released on October 2, 2017
No.	Title	Lyrics	Music	Artist	Length
1.	"Love-ing" (사랑 ing)	June	Oh Joon-sung	Eunha (GFriend)	04:18
2.	"Love-ing" (Inst.)		Oh Joon-sung		04:18
Total length:					08:36

=== Part 3 ===
Released on October 9, 2017
No.	Title	Lyrics	Music	Artist	Length
1.	"I Still"	Kim Yoo-kyung	Oh Joon-sung	Cheeze	03:20
2.	"I Still (Piano Ver.)"	Kim Yoo-kyung	Oh Joon-sung	Cheeze	03:19
3.	"I Still" (Inst.)		Oh Joon-sung		03:20
4.	"I Still (Piano Ver.)" (Inst.)		Oh Joon-sung		03:19
Total length:					13:18

=== Part 4 ===
Released on October 16, 2017
No.	Title	Lyrics	Music	Artist	Length
1.	"It Has to Be You" (꼭 너여야 해)	Choi Jae-woo, Lee Ha-jin	Oh Joon-sung	Bong-gu (GB9)	04:32
2.	"It Has to Be You" (Inst.)		Oh Joon-sung		04:33
Total length:					09:05

=== Part 5 ===
Released on October 23, 2017
No.	Title	Lyrics	Music	Artist	Length
1.	"Let Me Love You" (나만 아는 엔딩)	Kim Yoo-kyung	Oh Joon-sung	Stella Jang	04:33
2.	"Blooming Love"		Oh Joon-sung		02:30
3.	"Love Temperature"		Oh Joon-sung		02:03
4.	"Let Me Know Youu"		Oh Joon-sung		02:25
5.	"Feel Good Soup"		Oh Joon-sung		01:39
6.	"Cooking Melody"		Oh Joon-sung		01:46
7.	"Heartbreak Today"		Oh Joon-sung		01:44
8.	"Different View"		Oh Joon-sung		02:27
9.	"The Man in a Suit"		Oh Joon-sung		02:12
10.	"Too Close to Breathe"		Oh Joon-sung		01:42
11.	"Platonic Love"		Oh Joon-sung		02:25
12.	"You Are My Home"		Oh Joon-sung		02:07
13.	"Let Me Love You" (Inst.)		Oh Joon-sung		04:33
Total length:					32:06

=== Part 6 ===
Released on October 30, 2017
No.	Title	Lyrics	Music	Artist	Length
1.	"Wonderful Moment"	Fromm	Fromm	Fromm	03:56
2.	"Wonderful Moment" (Inst.)		Fromm		03:54
Total length:					07:50

=== Part 7 ===
Released on October 31, 2017
No.	Title	Lyrics	Music	Artist	Length
1.	"At That Time" (그때엔)	Jung Min-kyung, Hwang Myung-heum	Jung Min-kyung, Hwang Myung-heum	Jungheum Band	03:43
2.	"At That Time" (Inst.)		Jung Min-kyung, Hwang Myung-heum		03:43
Total length:					07:26

=== Part 8 ===
Released on November 6, 2017
No.	Title	Lyrics	Music	Artist	Length
1.	"Be Confused" (좋았다 말았다)	Cadence, Lee Jong-soo, Taebongie	Cadence, Lee Jong-soo, Taebongie	Chahee (Melody Day)	03:04
2.	"Be Confused" (Inst.)		Cadence, Lee Jong-soo, Taebongie		03:04
Total length:					06:08

=== Part 9 ===
Released on November 13, 2017
No.	Title	Lyrics	Music	Artist	Length
1.	"Just You" (너였고 너이고 너일 거라서)	Kim Yoo-kyung	Oh Joon-sung	Seven O'Clock	04:10
2.	"Just You" (Inst.)		Oh Joon-sung		04:10
Total length:					08:20

=== Part 10 ===
Released on November 14, 2017
No.	Title	Lyrics	Music	Artist	Length
1.	"Shiny Memories (ft. Lee Ji-eun)" (유난히 빛나)	Lee Noo-ri	Kim Sun-kyung	Kim Sun-kyung	03:46
2.	"Shiny Memories" (Inst.)		Kim Sun-kyung		03:46
Total length:					07:32

== Ratings ==
Ep.	Original broadcast date	Average audience share			
Ep.	Original broadcast date	TNmS		Nielsen Korea	
Ep.	Original broadcast date	Nationwide	Seoul	Nationwide	Seoul
1	September 18, 2017	7.1% (20th)	8.3% (15th)	7.1% (19th)	7.7% (16th)
2	September 18, 2017	7.9% (15th)	9.4% (8th)	8.0% (13th)	8.8% (8th)
3	September 19, 2017	7.2% (19th)	8.5% (9th)	7.2% (16th)	8.1% (11th)
4	September 19, 2017	8.4% (12th)	9.9% (7th)	9.2% (8th)	10.2% (5th)
5	September 25, 2017	8.4% (17th)	9.7% (8th)	8.2% (14th)	8.9% (11th)
6	September 25, 2017	9.5% (11th)	10.9% (4th)	10.4% (8th)	11.6% (5th)
7	September 26, 2017	7.5% (16th)	7.8% (9th)	8.6% (8th)	10% (7th)
8	September 26, 2017	8.5% (14th)	9.3% (7th)	11.0% (6th)	12.4% (4th)
9	October 2, 2017	7.4% (20th)	8.1% (9th)	8.1% (16th)	8.9% (12th)
10	October 2, 2017	9.2% (8th)	9.6% (4th)	9.6% (9th)	10.6% (5th)
11	October 3, 2017	7.3% (13th)	7.1% (8th)	6.7% (15th)	7.2% (10th)
12	October 3, 2017	8.9% (7th)	8.5% (7th)	8.4% (6th)	9.4% (5th)
13	October 9, 2017	9.4% (15th)	11.0% (5th)	9.3% (13th)	10.8% (8th)
14	October 9, 2017	10.5% (8th)	11.6% (3rd)	11.2% (6th)	12.9% (3rd)
15	October 10, 2017	9.1% (14th)	10.9% (8th)	8.8% (10th)	9.9% (7th)
16	October 10, 2017	10.3% (10th)	12.3% (5th)	10.3% (7th)	11.4% (6th)
17	October 16, 2017	7.2% (20th)	8.1% (15th)	6.8% (NR)	7.7% (13th)
18	October 16, 2017	8.4% (16th)	9.7% (9th)	7.9% (12th)	8.9% (18th)
19	October 23, 2017 (Note: No episodes were aired on October 17, 2022 as a baseball match aired before the series was delayed and eventually overran. Episodes 37 to 40 were shown back-to-back on November 21 as a result.)	6.1% (NR)	7.2% (20th)	6.6% (NR)	7.8% (15th)
20	October 23, 2017	6.8% (NR)	7.8% (14th)	8.1% (13th)	9.5% (9th)
21	October 24, 2017	6.7% (16th)	7.5% (12th)	6.5% (15th)	7.6% (11th)
22	October 24, 2017	7.9% (15th)	8.4% (10th)	7.6% (13th)	8.4% (10th)
23	October 30, 2017	6.1% (NR)	6.8% (NR)	6.5% (NR)	7.2% (18th)
24	October 30, 2017	7.2% (20th)	8.2% (14th)	7.9% (14th)	8.9% (10th)
25	October 31, 2017	6.5% (NR)	7.1% (14th)	6.8% (18th)	8.0% (14th)
26	October 31, 2017	7.6% (16th)	7.7% (12th)	9.0% (9th)	10.8% (5th)
27	November 6, 2017	5.5% (NR)	6.3% (NR)	5.7% (NR)	6.7% (NR)
28	November 6, 2017	6.6% (NR)	7.0% (16th)	6.9% (19th)	6.7% (19th)
29	November 7, 2017	5.5% (NR)	5.6% (NR)	6.1% (NR)	7.5% (13th)
30	November 7, 2017	6.5% (18th)	6.7% (19th	7.2% (15th)	8.7% (8th)
31	November 13, 2017	4.5% (NR)	4.6% (NR)	5.8% (NR)	5.9% (NR)
32	November 13, 2017	5.1% (NR)	5.8% (NR)	7.0% (20th)	7.7% (17th)
33	November 14, 2017	6.4% (19th)	6.3% (17th)	6.4% (20th)	6.9% (16th)
34	November 14, 2017	6.3% (20th)	6.7% (14th)	7.3% (16th)	8.0% (13th)
35	November 20, 2017	4.8% (NR)	5.4% (NR)	6.1% (NR)	6.7% (14th)
36	November 20, 2017	5.4% (NR)	6.3% (NR)	7.5% (13th)	8.2% (12th)
37	November 21, 2017	5.4% (NR)	6.2% (NR)	6.7% (20th)	7.5% (13th)
38	November 21, 2017	6.3% (19th)	6.3% (18th)	7.7% (11th)	8.8% (10th)
39	November 21, 2017	6.8% (16th)	7.5% (11th)	8.2% (9th)	9.4% (8th)
40	November 21, 2017	6.7% (17th)	7.5% (10th)	8.4% (8th)	9.5% (7th)
Average		7.23%	7.99%	7.82%	8.83%
In the table above, the blue numbers represent the lowest ratings and the red numbers represent the highest ratings.; NR denotes that the series did not rank in the top 20 daily programs on that date.

== Awards and nominations ==
Year	Award	Category	Nominee(s)	Result	Ref.
2017	30th Grimae Awards	Best Actress	Seo Hyun-jin	Won	
2017	25th SBS Drama Awards	Grand Prize (Daesang)	Seo Hyun-jin	Nominated	
2017	25th SBS Drama Awards	Top Excellence Award, Actress in a Monday–Tuesday Drama	Seo Hyun-jin	Nominated	
2017	25th SBS Drama Awards	Excellence Award, Actor in a Monday–Tuesday Drama	Kim Jae-wook	Nominated	
2017	25th SBS Drama Awards	Excellence Award, Actress in a Monday–Tuesday Drama	Jo Bo-ah	Nominated	
2017	25th SBS Drama Awards	Best New Actor	Yang Se-jong	Won	
2017	25th SBS Drama Awards	Best New Actress	Jo Bo-ah	Nominated	
2017	25th SBS Drama Awards	Best Supporting Actress	Hwang Seok-jeong	Nominated	
2017	25th SBS Drama Awards	Best Supporting Actress	Lee Cho-hee	Nominated	
2017	25th SBS Drama Awards	Best Couple Award	Yang Se-jong and Seo Hyun-jin	Nominated	
2018	54th Baeksang Arts Awards	Best New Actor	Yang Se-jong	Won	
2018	6th APAN Star Awards	Best New Actor	Yang Se-jong	Won	
2018	6th APAN Star Awards	K-Star Award	Yang Se-jong	Nominated	
