= Ye Ji-won =

South Korean actress (born 1973)

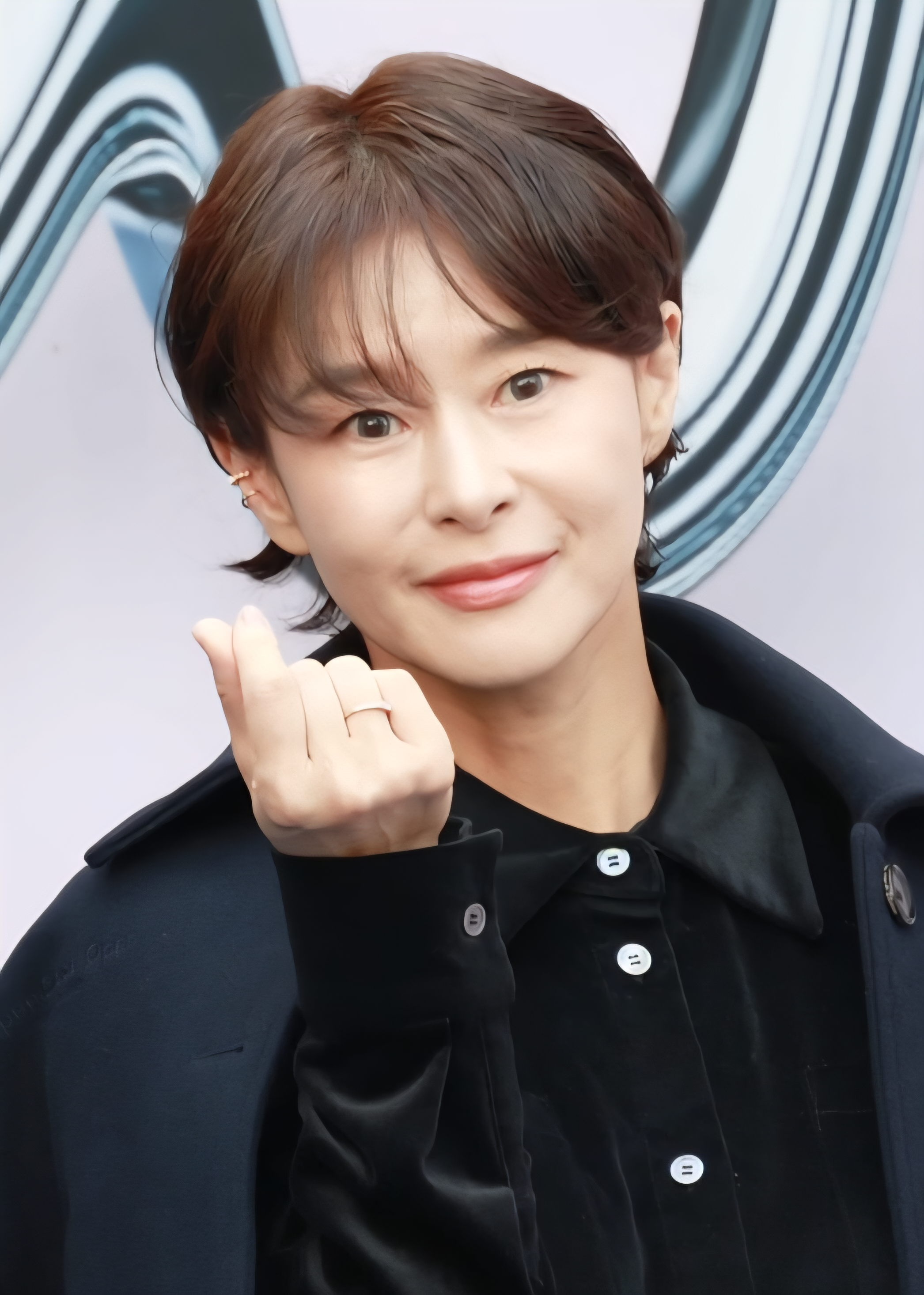
- Ye in September 2024
- Born: Lee Yoo-jung; February 1, 1973 (age 53); Eunpyeong District, Seoul, South Korea
- Education: Seoul Institute of the Arts - Broadcasting
- Occupation: Actress
- Years active: 1991–present
- Agent: The Queen AMC

Korean name
- Hangul: 이유정
- RR: I Yujeong
- MR: I Yujŏng

Stage name
- Hangul: 예지원
- RR: Ye Jiwon
- MR: Ye Chiwŏn

Ye Ji-won (Korean: 예지원; born February 1, 1973) is a South Korean actress.

== Career ==
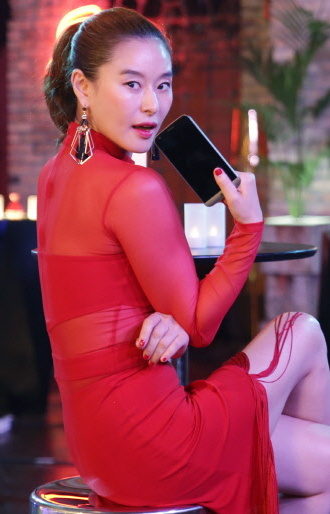
Ye for LG in 2016

She is best known for her leading role in the hit sitcom Old Miss Diary, and her more serious turns in Hong Sang-soo films Turning Gate and Hahaha.

In October 2018, Ye signed with new agency The Queen AMC.

== Filmography ==
=== Film ===
Year	Title	Role	Notes	Ref.
1996	Mulberry	An-hyeop		
2000	Anarchists	Fumiko Kaneko		
2000	Lovers			
2002	On the Occasion of Remembering the Turning Gate	Myung-sook		
2002	2424	Jo Kwang-ja		
2003	The First Amendment of Korea	Go Eun-bi		
2003	Father's Secret	Yoo-jung		
2004	So Cute	Soon-yi		
2006	Old Miss Diary - Movie	Choi Mi-ja		
2007	Meet Mr. Daddy	Ha Seon-young		
2007	Femme Fatal	Ji-won		
2008	What Happened Last Night?	Yoo-jin		
2008	Boy Meets Boy	Fairy (Cupid)	short film	
2009	After the Banquet	Lee Yoo-ri	telecinema	
2010	Ha Ha Ha	Ahn Yeon-joo		
2011	Hanji	Hyo-kyung		
2011	The Kick	Yun Mi-ja		
2012	The Heaven is Only Open to the Single!	Movie director's girlfriend	(cameo)	
2012	The Winter of the Year Was Warm	Yoo-jung		
2013	Nobody's Daughter Haewon	Yeon-joo		
2013	Boomerang Family	Han Soo-ja		
2013	Our Sunhi	Joo-hyun		
2014	Invitation	Jang Hyun-jae		
2015	Revivre	Dance master	cameo	
2019	Homme Fatale	Nan Seol		
2022	Vanishing	Im Sook	Korean-French Film	

=== Television series ===
Year	Title	Role	Notes	Ref.
2000	Tough Guy's Love	Yoon Jung-hee		
2000	Juliet's Man	Chae-rin		
2001	Girls' High School Days	Ye Ji-won		
2002	Bad Girls	Oh Jung-hwa		
2004	Old Miss Diary	Choi Mi-ja		
2007	Evasive Inquiry Agency	Jung Hee-kyung		
2010	More Charming by the Day	Im Ji-won		
2012	Tasty Life	Oh Jin-joo		
2013	Dating Agency: Cyrano	Lee Hae-shim	Cameo (episodes 10–12)	
2013	KBS Drama Special: "Chagall's Birthday"	Eun-ha	one act-drama	
2014	Naeil's Cantabile	Song Mi-na		
2015	The Producers	Go Yang-mi		
2016	Page Turner	Yoo-seul's mother		
2016	Another Miss Oh	Park Soo-kyung		
2016	Listen to Love	Eun Ah-ra		
2017	Introverted Boss	Dang Yoo-hee		
2018	Should We Kiss First?	Lee Mi-ra		
2018	Still 17	Jennifer		
2018	The Beauty Inside	Herself	Cameo (episode 1)	
2019	Love Affairs in the Afternoon	Choi Soo-A		
2019–2020	Never Twice	Bang Eun-ji		
2020	Hospital Playlist	Jung-won's eldest sister	Cameo (episode 1)	
2020	Dinner Mate	Ah-yeong		
2020	Do Do Sol Sol La La Sol	Jin Sook-kyeong		
2021–2022	The King of Tears, Lee Bang-won	Queen Sindeok		
2023	Brain Works	Kim Mo-ran		
2023	The Heavenly Idol	Lim Seon-ja		

=== Web series ===
Year	Title	Role	Notes	Ref.
2023	People of the Blue House	first lady	sitcom	

=== Television shows ===
Year	Title	Role	Notes	Ref.
2008	Here Comes Gold Miss	Cast member		
2008	화가들의 천국, 퐁피두에 가다			
2011	Chuseok Special Star Couple Best Story	Host		
2012	Saturday Night Live Korea	Host	January 21, 2012	
2012	Dancing with the Stars: Season 2	Contestant		
2013	Talk Club Actors	Host		
2013	Great In-Laws			
2013	Law of the Jungle in Micronesia	Cast member		
2014	Law of the Jungle in Brazil	Cast member		
2016	Law of the Jungle in Mongolia	Cast member		
2021	Knowing Chuck Salong	Cast member		
2022	Scance, not Hocance	Host		

=== Hosting ===
Year	Title	Notes	Ref.
2021	DMZ International Documentary Film Festival	Opening ceremony; with Lim Hyeon-joo	

== Theater ==
Year	Title	Role	Ref.
2001	The Vagina Monologues		
2001	The Rocky Horror Show		
2011	Midsummer	Helena	
2012	Clumsy People	Yoo Hwa-yi	
2013	Resurrection		
2014	Please Look After Mom	Eldest daughter	

== Ambassadorship ==
- Seoul Dance Film Festival (SeDaFF) Ambassador (2021–2025)

== Accolades ==
=== Awards and nominations ===
Name of the award ceremony, year presented, category, nominee of the award, and the result of the nomination
Award ceremony	Year	Category	Nominee / Work	Result	Ref.
APAN Star Awards	2016	Best Supporting Actress	Another Oh Hae-young	Won	
Baeksang Arts Awards	2014	Best Supporting Actress – Film	Our Sunhi	Nominated	
Baeksang Arts Awards	2018	Best Supporting Actress – Television	Should We Kiss First?	Won	
Busan Film Critics Awards	2007	Best Actress	Old Miss Diary - Movie	Won	
Busan International Film Festival	2022	Etoile du Cinema	Vanishing	Won	
Chunsa Film Art Awards	2002	Best Supporting Actress	On the Occasion of Remembering the Turning Gate	Won	
Grand Bell Awards	1996	Best New Actress	Mulberry	Nominated	
Grand Bell Awards	2003	Best Actress	The First Amendment of Korea	Nominated	
Grand Bell Awards	2007	Best Actress	Old Miss Diary - Movie	Nominated	
KBS Drama Awards	2013	Best Actress in a One-Act Drama/Special	Chagall's Birthday	Nominated	
KBS Drama Awards	2020	Best Supporting Actress	Do Do Sol Sol La La Sol	Won	
KBS Drama Awards	2022	Best Supporting Actress	The King of Tears, Lee Bang-won	Won	
KBS Drama Awards	2022	Excellence Award, Actress in a Serial Drama	The King of Tears, Lee Bang-won	Nominated	
KBS Entertainment Awards	2005	Netizen Popularity Award	Old Miss Diary	Won	
Korea Cable TV Awards	2017	Scene Stealer Award	Another Oh Hae-young	Won	
Korea Cable TV Awards	2017	Best Couple Award with Kim Ji-seok	Another Oh Hae-young	Won	
MBC Drama Awards	2019	Grand Prize (Daesang)	Never Twice	Nominated	
MBC Drama Awards	2019	Top Excellence Award, Actress in a Weekend Drama	Never Twice	Won	
SBS Drama Awards	2018	Best Supporting Actress	Still 17, Should We Kiss First?	Won	
The Seoul Awards	2018	Best Supporting Actress	Still 17	Nominated	
Scene Stealer Festival	2016	Bonsang "Main Prize"	Another Oh Hae-young	Won	
tvN10 Awards	2016	Scene-Stealer Award, Actress	Another Oh Hae-young	Nominated	
tvN10 Awards	2016	Best Kiss Award with Kim Ji-seok	Another Oh Hae-young	7th place	

=== State honors ===
Name of country, award ceremony, year given, and name of honor
Country	Award Ceremony	Year	Honor	Ref.
France	Busan International Film Festival - the French Night (Note: Annual Event held at Busan International Film Festival by French Embassy in South Korea)	2022	the Etoile du Cinema awards	
