= Still 17 =

2018 South Korean television series

- Promotional poster
- Also known as: 30 But 17
- Hangul: 서른이지만 열일곱입니다
- Lit.: Thirty But Seventeen
- RR: Seoreunijiman yeorilgobimnida
- MR: Sŏrŭnijiman yŏrilgobimnida
- Genre: Romantic comedy Time slip
- Written by: Jo Sung-hee
- Directed by: Jo Soo-won
- Starring: Shin Hye-sun; Yang Se-jong; Ahn Hyo-seop; Ye Ji-won
- Music by: Moon Seong-nam
- Country of origin: South Korea
- Original language: Korean
- No. of episodes: 32 (Note: In order to circumvent Korean laws that prevent commercial breaks in the middle of an episode, what would previously have been aired as single 70 minute episodes are now being repackaged as two 35 minute episodes, with two episodes being shown each night with a commercial break between the two.)

Production
- Executive producers: Moon Seok-hwan; Oh Kwang-hee
- Camera setup: Single-camera
- Running time: 35 minutes
- Production company: Bon Factory Worldwide

Original release
- Network: SBS TV
- Release: July 23 – September 18, 2018

Still 17 (Korean: 서른이지만 열일곱입니다) is a 2018 South Korean television series starring Shin Hye-sun, Yang Se-jong, Ahn Hyo-seop and Ye Ji-won. It aired on SBS TV from July 23 to September 18, 2018, every Monday and Tuesday at 22:00 (KST) for 32 episodes.

== Synopsis ==
Gong Woo-jin (Yang Se-jong) is a 30-year-old single man who works as a set designer. Due to trauma he experienced 13 years ago, he does not want to have a relationship with others. When Woo Seo-ri (Shin Hye-sun) was 17, she fell into a coma. Thirteen years later, she wakes up from her coma, but she is now 30 years old. Gong Woo-jin and Woo Seo-ri get involved with each other and fall in love.

Gong Woo-jin caused an accident when he was 17 years old, or so he believes. Due to the crush he had on a girl of his age, he caused her to stay on the bus she was travelling for one stop longer than required. As a result, she was still on the bus when it crashed, and later Gong Woo-jin finds out that this girl (No Soo-mi) died in the accident. He feels very guilty and goes away to study in Germany and carries this guilt with him into adulthood. As a result, he becomes a very strange adult. His habits include getting out a tape to make measurements for his set design miniatures at any given moment. He often gets into trouble for this habit, and he's also cold and rude to others. He even leaves Korea for long periods of time to go on trips without a word to anyone.

Woo Seo-ri wakes up in hospital confused to find that she has aged 13 years overnight. She last remembers being 17 years old, wearing her friend No Soo-mi's jacket since she forgot to pick up her own. She was in a coma and woke up after 13 years to find herself much older and very weak. Sadly, she has no visitors, and the staff can't even find out where her relatives (her Aunt and Uncle; her parents died when she was young) are. Seo-ri finds this out after overhearing the nurse who keeps fobbing her off with excuses talking about how they say this to patients whose relatives don't come by anymore.

She decides to take matters into her own hands and search for her Aunt and Uncle. She goes to the last place she remembers them - their home - but the city is hugely changed from how she remembers. By a twist of fate, her Aunt and Uncle no longer live there: they sold the house to Woo-jin's father, who is now letting his adult son stay there while he's back in Korea. Woo-jin is also looking after his nephew, Yoo Chan (Ahn Hyo-seop), an energetic and friendly guy who instantly wants to take care of Seo-ri, despite Woo-jin's misgivings. Neither of them recognizes one another at first, but Woo-jin agrees to let her stay for just one night so that she can begin the search for her relatives.

Meanwhile, at the hospital, a doctor is dismayed to hear that Seo-ri has gone missing and begins to search for her. The next day, he asks about her at her old home - but a misunderstanding doesn't let them meet.

The plot follows Seo-ri's search for her relatives; the budding romances between Seo-ri and Woo-jin, but also Yoo Chan and the doctor, who both develop ill-fated feelings for her; Woo-jin's transformation from a surly and closed-off set designer to someone who dares to love again; Yoo Chan's rowing championships; and their strange housekeeper Jennifer (Ye Ji-won), who ends up being tied up in the accident thanks to her past as well.

== Cast ==
=== Main ===
- Shin Hye-sun as Woo Seo-ri
  - Park Si-eun as young Seo-ri
  - Lee Hyo-bi as child Seo-ri

An aspiring violinist whose dreams were destroyed due to an accident. She got into a bus accident when she was 17 years old and woke up from a coma after 13 years. She still feels she is 17 even though she is now 30 years old. She has been looking for her uncle and aunt who did not come to visit her and even sold their house where Seo-ri lived with them. She later develops feelings for Woo-jin unaware of their past.

- Yang Se-jong as Gong Woo-jin
  - Yoon Chan-young as young Woo-jin

A stage designer who maintains a detached and aloof behavior. He goes to great lengths to keep himself from getting involved with those around him such as by wearing earphones, blocking the clients from contacting him and by putting on an obtuse personality and generally just ignoring social cues. Because of his occupation, he has developed a habit of measuring random items in public with a measuring tape.
When he was younger, he had a crush on a girl who he learned was named No Soo-mi because of the uniform name tag not knowing that it was borrowed. On the day of their first interaction, she was involved in an accident which resulted in several deaths. Woo-jin blames himself for what happened to her and so he decided not to become involved with others in any way in the future. He later develops feelings for Seo-ri unaware of who in the past she actually was for him.

- Ahn Hyo-seop as Yoo Chan
  - Seo Yoon-hyuk as young Chan

Woo-jin's nephew and protector. Captain of the rowing club of Taesan High School. He falls for Seo-ri after knowing of her history but lets go of those feelings with time. He's a staunch supporter of Woo-jin and Seo-ri's relationship and is very thankful to Seo-ri for returning his uncle the way he used to be.

- Ye Ji-won as Jennifer

A well-versed lady, skilled in martial arts and always focused on the work she does, she has modern charming looks although she wears the same attire and is in her 40's. She has a strange personality. She is also the housekeeper of the house where Gong Woo-jin and his nephew reside. She harbors a secret that indirectly ties her with the accident 13 years ago.

=== Supporting ===
==== People around Gong Woo-jin ====
- Jung Yoo-jin as Kang Hee-soo

A talented stage designer. Woo-jin's colleague.

- Ahn Seung-gyun as Jin Hyun
- Lee Ah-hyun as Gong Hyun-jung

Woo-jin's sister and Yoo Chan's mother. A surgeon.

==== People around Woo Seo-ri ====
- Wang Ji-won as Kim Tae-rin
  - Jo Soo-ji as young Tae-rin

A talented violinist and music director. Seo-ri's biggest competitor.

- Yoon Sun-woo as Kim Hyung-tae
  - Wang Seok-hyeon as young Hyung-tae

A neurology resident. Seo-ri's childhood friend who has had a crush on her and is the only one who knows her relatives' whereabouts.

- Lee Seo-yeon as No Soo-mi

Seo-ri's best friend. She died in the accident. She lent her school uniform to Seo-ri causing Woo-jin to mistake Seo-ri's name for her best friend's name.

==== Woo Seo-ri's family ====
- Jeon Ye-seo as Kim Hyun-jin

Seo-ri's late mother.

- Jeon Bae-soo as Woo Sung-hyun

Seo-ri's late father.

- Lee Seung-joon as Kim Hyun-gyu

Hyun-jin's old brother and Seo-ri's uncle. He became her legal guardian after her parents passed away.

- Shim Yi-young as Kook Mi-hyun

Hyun-gyu's wife and Seo-ri's aunt.

==== Taesan High School ====
- Lee Do-hyun as Dong Hae-bum

Yoo Chan's best friend.

- Jo Hyun-sik as Han Deok-soo

Yoo Chan's best friend.

- Cho Yu-jung as Lee Ri-an

Yoo Chan's friend who has a crush on him.

==== People around Jennifer ====
- Kim Young-jae as Kim Tae-jin (Ep. 28–29)

Jennifer's late husband who died in the accident 13 years ago.

==== Others ====
- Jung Ho-bin as Byun Gyu-chul
- Kim Min-sang as Woo-jin's physician
- Kim Ji-yee
- Son San
- Seo Yun-ah
- Ha Do-kwon as Rowing Club Coach
- Ji Dae-han
- Park Jong-hoon as violinist Shim Myung-hwan
- Min Eun-kyung

=== Special appearance ===
- Jeong Jin-woon as Jung Jin-woon

Yoo Chan's rival in rowing competition (Ep. 24–25)

== Production ==
The first script reading took place on May 16, 2018, at SBS Studio in Tanhyun, Ilsan, South Korea.

== Original soundtrack ==
Still 17 OST

Soundtrack album by Various Artists
- Released: 2018
- Genre: Soundtrack
- Languages: Korean; English
- Labels: Bon Factory Worldwide; Kakao M
- Producers: Moon Seok-hwan; Oh Kwang-hee

=== Part 1 ===
Released on July 30, 2018
No.	Title	Lyrics	Music	Artist	Length
1.	"Seventeen"	Moon Sung-nam (Every Single Day)	Moon Sung-nam (Every Single Day); Jung Jae-woo	Every Single Day	3:31
2.	"Seventeen" (Inst.)		Moon Sung-nam (Every Single Day); Jung Jae-woo		3:31
Total length:					7:02

=== Part 2 ===
Released on August 7, 2018
No.	Title	Lyrics	Music	Artist	Length
1.	"Just Stay"	Good Choice; Kim Kyeong-beom	Kim Kyeong-beom; Kim Ji-hwan; Lee Jin-shil	Hyolyn	3:33
2.	"Just Stay" (Inst.)		Kim Kyeong-beom; Kim Ji-hwan; Lee Jin-shil		3:33
Total length:					7:06

=== Part 3 ===
Released on August 13, 2018
No.	Title	Lyrics	Music	Artist	Length
1.	"Thirty Waltz"	Moon Sung-nam (Every Single Day); Lim Joo-yeon	Moon Sung-nam (Every Single Day); Lim Joo-yeon	Tarin	3:47
2.	"Thirty Waltz" (Inst.)		Moon Sung-nam (Every Single Day); Lim Joo-yeon		3:47
Total length:					7:34

=== Part 4 ===
Released on August 21, 2018
No.	Title	Lyrics	Music	Artist	Length
1.	"Tears In My Heart (내 맘 속의 눈물)"	Lucia	Lucia	Lucia	3:25
2.	"Tears In My Heart" (Inst.)		Lucia		3:25
Total length:					6:50

=== Part 5 ===
Released on September 4, 2018
No.	Title	Lyrics	Music	Artist	Length
1.	"Get Away"	Moon Sung-nam (Every Single Day), Im Joo-yeon	Moon Sung-nam (Every Single Day), Im Joo-yeon	Bonggu	4:56
2.	"Get Away" (Inst.)		Moon Sung-nam (Every Single Day), Im Joo-yeon		4:56
Total length:					9:52

=== Part 6 ===
Released on September 11, 2018
No.	Title	Lyrics	Music	Artist	Length
1.	"Right Now We (우리 지금)"	Kim Ho-kyung	1601	Migyo	3:10
2.	"Right Now We" (Inst.)		1601		3:10
Total length:					6:20

=== Part 7 ===
Released on September 17, 2018
No.	Title	Lyrics	Music	Artist	Length
1.	"Walk With Me (같이 걷자)"	Good Choice	Park Jung-wook	Parc Jae-jung	3:46
2.	"Walk With Me" (Inst.)		Park Jung-wook		3:46
Total length:					7:32

Disc 2:
No.	Title	Artist	Length
1.	"Unravel" (Opening Title)	Various Artists	0:56
2.	"Amnesia"	Various Artists	2:51
3.	"Fab Donkey"	Various Artists	2:02
4.	"From"	Various Artists	1:43
5.	"Funco"	Various Artists	1:51
6.	"Get away strings"	Various Artists	3:39
7.	"Hongkong"	Various Artists	1:49
8.	"Into the Memory"	Various Artists	2:31
9.	"Little Carnival"	Various Artists	2:05
10.	"Seventeen strings"	Various Artists	2:40
11.	"Tangerine strings"	Various Artists	4:22
12.	"Thirty Tension strings"	Various Artists	3:10

== Viewership ==
Still 17 : South Korea viewers per episode (millions)

Episodes	Episode number															
Episodes	1	2	3	4	5	6	7	8	9	10	11	12	13	14	15	16
1–16	0.981	1.211	1.185	1.477	1.505	1.815	1.465	1.803	1.315	1.608	1.382	1.692	1.525	1.785	1.443	1.910
17–32	1.184	1.712	1.643	1.875	1.658	1.933	1.490	1.796	1.606	1.846	1.529	1.762	1.590	1.801	1.616	1.997

Source: Audience measurement performed nationwide by Nielsen Media Research.

Ep.	Original broadcast date	Average audience share			
Ep.	Original broadcast date	Nielsen Korea		TNmS	
Ep.	Original broadcast date	Nationwide	Seoul	Nationwide	Seoul
1	July 23, 2018	5.7% (18th)	6.7% (17th)	5.8%	6.9%
2	July 23, 2018	7.1% (14th)	8.0% (6th)	6.4%	7.3%
3	July 24, 2018	6.9% (12th)	7.8% (6th)	6.2%	7.1%
4	July 24, 2018	8.2% (6th)	9.4% (4th)	7.5%	8.7%
5	July 30, 2018	7.6% (9th)	8.9% (6th)	7.8%	9.1%
6	July 30, 2018	8.8% (6th)	10.1% (3rd)	8.5%	9.7%
7	July 31, 2018	7.3% (9th)	7.9% (6th)	6.2%	6.8%
8	July 31, 2018	9.0% (4th)	9.5% (4th)	7.8%	8.3%
9	August 6, 2018	7.2% (12th)	8.0% (9th)	7.2%	7.9%
10	August 6, 2018	8.8% (6th)	9.9% (4th)	8.3%	9.4%
11	August 7, 2018	7.6% (9th)	8.6% (5th)	7.8%	9.0%
12	August 7, 2018	9.1% (5th)	11.0% (3rd)	9.0%	10.9%
13	August 13, 2018	8.2% (9th)	9.5% (5th)	8.2%	9.4%
14	August 13, 2018	9.7% (6th)	11.2% (3rd)	9.2%	10.6%
15	August 14, 2018	8.4% (7th)	9.6% (5th)	7.7%	8.9%
16	August 14, 2018	10.5% (4th)	12.1% (2nd)	9.0%	10.4%
17	August 21, 2018 (Note: No episodes were aired on 20 and 27 August due to coverage of the 2018 Asian Games.) (Note: Originally scheduled to be pushed back to 10.30pm, episodes 17 and 18 were later reverted to air at the original time instead.)	7.5% (9th)	8.9% (6th)	7.1%	8.6%
18	August 21, 2018	9.9% (4th)	11.3% (4th)	9.5%	11.0%
19	August 28, 2018	9.8% (5th)	11.3% (4th)	9.2%	10.7%
20	August 28, 2018	10.8% (4th)	12.5% (3rd)	10.4%	12.1%
21	September 3, 2018	8.7% (10th)	10.4% (4th)	9.4%	N/A
22	September 3, 2018	10.2% (6th)	12.0% (3rd)	10.3%	N/A
23	September 4, 2018	9.3% (6th)	10.8% (4th)	8.6%	N/A
24	September 4, 2018	10.8% (4th)	12.2% (3rd)	10.4%	N/A
25	September 10, 2018	9.5% (7th)	10.9% (4th)	8.2%	N/A
26	September 10, 2018	10.9% (4th)	12.5% (3rd)	9.6%	N/A
27	September 11, 2018	8.9% (6th)	10.3% (4th)	8.6%	N/A
28	September 11, 2018	10.4% (3rd)	11.8% (3rd)	9.8%	N/A
29	September 17, 2018	9.8% (7th)	11.6% (4th)	8.3%	N/A
30	September 17, 2018	10.7% (3rd)	12.5% (3rd)	9.8%	N/A
31	September 18, 2018	9.2% (4th)	10.8% (3rd)	8.7%	N/A
32	September 18, 2018	11.0% (2nd)	12.5% (1st)	10.4%	N/A
Average		9.0%	10.3%	8.5%	—
In the table above, the blue numbers represent the lowest ratings and the red numbers represent the highest ratings.; N/A denotes that the rating is not known.

== Awards and nominations ==
Year	Award	Category	Recipient	Result	Ref.
2018	2nd The Seoul Awards	Best Actress	Shin Hye-sun	Nominated	
2018	2nd The Seoul Awards	Best Supporting Actress	Ye Ji-won	Nominated	
2018	SBS Drama Awards	Top Excellence Award, Actress in a Monday-Tuesday Drama	Shin Hye-sun	Won	
2018	SBS Drama Awards	Excellence Award, Actor in a Monday-Tuesday Drama	Yang Se-jong	Won	
2018	SBS Drama Awards	Best Supporting Actress	Ye Ji-won	Won	
2018	SBS Drama Awards	Best New Actor	Ahn Hyo-seop	Won	
2018	SBS Drama Awards	Best Character	Ahn Hyo-seop	Nominated	
2018	SBS Drama Awards	Best Character	Lee Do-hyun	Nominated	
2018	SBS Drama Awards	Best Character	Jo Hyun-sik	Nominated	
2018	SBS Drama Awards	Best Young Actor	Yoon Chan-young	Nominated	
2018	SBS Drama Awards	Best Young Actress	Park Si-eun	Won	
2018	SBS Drama Awards	Best Couple	Yang Se-jong and Shin Hye-sun	Nominated	
