= Shin Hye-sun =

South Korean actress (born 1989)

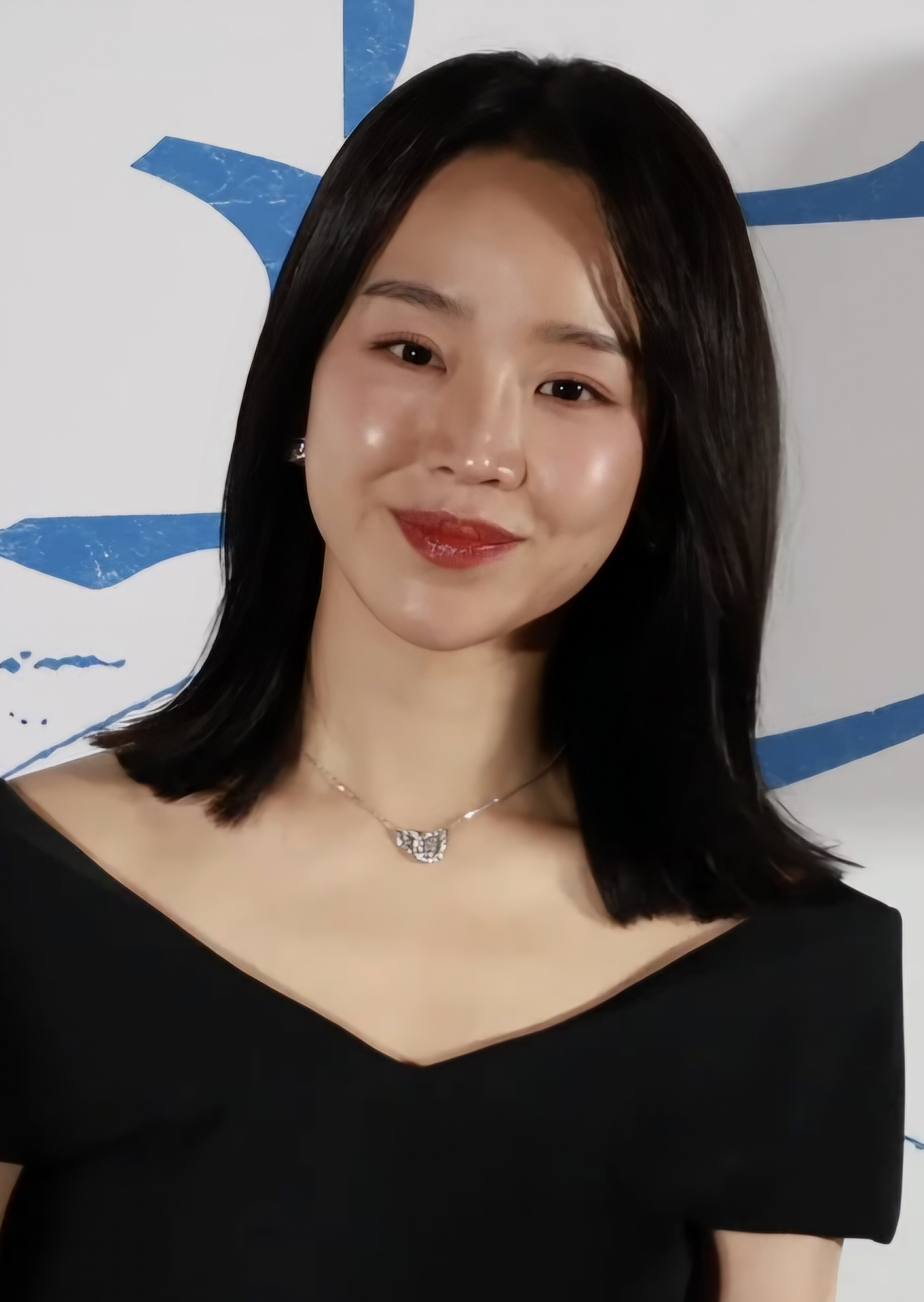
- Shin in 2024
- Born: August 31, 1989 (age 37); Seoul, South Korea
- Other name: Shin Hae-sun
- Education: Sejong University (Film Art)
- Occupation: Actress
- Years active: 2012–present
- Agent: Management Seesun

Korean name
- Hangul: 신혜선
- RR: Sin Hyeseon
- MR: Sin Hyesŏn

Shin Hye-sun (Korean: 신혜선; born August 31, 1989) is a South Korean actress. She debuted in the television series School 2013. In 2017, Shin played her first leading role and became well known in the weekend drama, My Golden Life, which garnered more than 8 million viewers. She is also best known for her other leading roles in Korean dramas such as Still 17 (2018), Angel's Last Mission: Love (2019), Stranger (2017–2020), Mr. Queen (2020–2021), See You in My 19th Life (2023), Welcome to Samdal-ri (2023–2024), The Art of Sarah (2026), and Filing for Love (2026).

== Career ==
=== 2012–2016: Career beginnings and minor roles ===
Shin debuted as an actress through the TV drama School 2013, an installment of the long-running School series, after successfully passing the audition to cast in a schoolgirl role. She played a minor character with the same name as hers.

Shin began to land bigger roles in 2015 with Oh My Ghost and She Was Pretty. Though both titles were romantic comedies, her characters varied significantly.

=== 2016–2017: Breakthrough ===
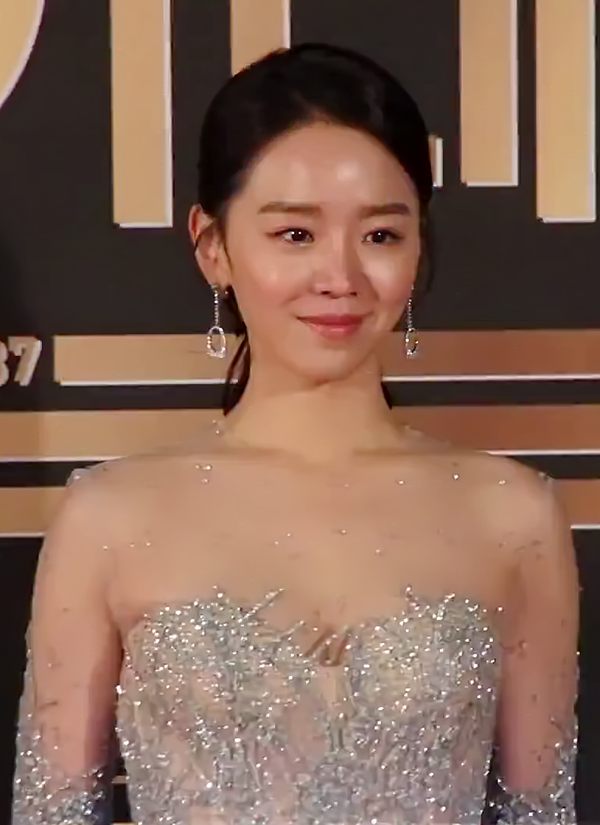
Shin at the 2017 KBS Drama Awards

Her breakthrough came in 2016 with Five Enough. Her role as a gullible, naively-romantic woman and her pairing with actor Sung Hoon gained popularity among the viewers. The same year, she appeared in the fantasy-romance drama The Legend of the Blue Sea.

In 2017, she starred in the mystery thriller film A Day. Shin then played a key figure in an acclaimed crime thriller series Stranger. Soon after, she was cast in her first lead role in a television drama with KBS2's drama My Golden Life. The drama was a major hit in South Korea and surpassed 40% ratings, leading to an increased recognition for Shin. In addition, she received various offers from the advertising industry and producers of movies and dramas.

=== 2018–2019: Artistic characters ===
In 2018, Shin was cast as a lead in the SBS drama special The Hymn of Death alongside Lee Jong-suk. She played the role of Yun Sim-deok, Korea's first professional soprano singer.

The same year, she starred alongside Yang Se-jong in the SBS romance comedy drama Still 17, as an aspiring violinist whose life turned upside down due to an accident.

In 2019, Shin starred in the KBS2 fantasy romance drama Angel's Last Mission: Love alongside Kim Myung-soo, as a ballerina who has no interest in love.

=== 2020–present: Film debut and rising popularity ===
In 2020, she was cast to play her first lead role in the legal film Innocence, as a lawyer who decides to defend her mother (Bae Jong-ok) from prosecution. She received positive reviews for her performance in the film and was nominated in the Best New Actress category at the 41st Blue Dragon Film Awards.

In November, she appeared in the caper story film Collectors with Lee Je-hoon, as an art curator Yoon and later in the tvN hit drama Mr. Queen in a dual lead role as both Kim So-yong (Queen Cheorin) as well as Jang Bong-hwan, a male chef from 2020 whose soul travels back in time and gets trapped in Kim So-yong's body. Shin was nominated for 57th Baeksang Arts Awards in the category Best Actress (TV) for her performance in Mr. Queen and the branch of Best New Actress (Film) in the Innocence.

On December 14, 2021, Shin renewed again her contract with YNK Entertainment.

In 2023, Shin played the lead role of Ban Ji-eum in See You in My 19th Life as a woman who can remember all of her previous lives and wants to reconnect with a man from her previous 18th life. She also played the lead role in the drama Welcome to Samdal-ri alongside Ji Chang-wook. It follows the story of a photographer who returns to her hometown after suffering a fall from grace, rekindling an unfinished romance.

In April 2025, Shin has signed an exclusive contract with the new company Management Seesun.

In 2026, Shin starred in the Netflix mystery thriller television series The Art of Sarah and portrayed several characters with different personalities.

== Public image ==
She has been lauded by industry insiders for her acting skills, her ability to convey emotions to her audience and her accurate diction, earning her the nickname "Diction Fairy", and being called by insiders as one of the best actresses of her generation.

== Philanthropy ==
On August 30, 2022, Shin donated ₩100 million to help those affected by the 2022 South Korean floods through The Neighbors Honors Club.

== Filmography ==
Key
†	Denotes films that have not yet been released

=== Endorsement ===
Year	Brand / Company	Product / Campaign	Notes	Ref.
2025	PURAXEL (퓨라셀)	PURAXEL-ME (Beauty Device)		
2026	Dongkook Pharmaceutical (동국제약)	MyFit (Health Functional Food)		
2026	Hanwha Vision (한화비전)	Keeper (Store Management & CCTV Solution)		
2026	Viol Medical (비올메디컬)	DUOTITE (HIFU Lifting Device)	Brand Ambassador	
2026	Clé de Peau Beauté (끌레드뽀 보떼)	Luxury Skincare & Makeup	Korea Brand Ambassador	신혜선, 끌레드뽀 보떼 새 앰버서더 발탁
2026	The Edge (더엣지)	Women's Apparel (2026 F/W)	CJ온스타일 '더엣지', 배우 신혜선 모델로 신규 발탁	

=== Web series ===
Year	Title	Role	Notes	Ref.
2026	The Art of Sarah	Sarah Kim	Netflix original series	

=== Film ===
Year	Title	Role	Notes	Ref.
2014	One Summer Night	So-ra	Short film	
2014	Return Match	Joo-yeon	Short film	
2014	The Mother Earth	Dae-ji	Short film	
2016	A Violent Prosecutor	Yoon-ah	Bit part	
2017	A Day	Mi-kyung		
2020	Innocence	Ahn Jung-in		
2020	Collectors	Yoon Se-hee		
2023	Don't Buy the Seller	Jang Soo-hyun		
2023	Brave Citizen	So Shi-min		
2024	Following	Han So-ra		

=== Television series ===
Year	Title	Role	Notes	Ref.
2012–2013	School 2013	Shin Hye-sun		
2014	Angel Eyes	young Cha Min-soo		
2014	High School King of Savvy	Go Yoon-joo		
2014–2015	Forever Young	Han Mi-so	Korean-Vietnamese production	
2015	Oh My Ghost	Kang Eun-hee		
2015	She Was Pretty	Han Seol		
2016	Five Enough	Lee Yeon-tae		
2016	The Legend of the Blue Sea	Cha Si-ah		
2017–2020	Stranger	Young Eun-soo	Season 1 – Supporting role Season 2 – Cameo	
2017–2018	My Golden Life	Seo Ji-an		
2018	Still 17	Woo Seo-ri		
2018	The Hymn of Death	Yun Sim-deok	One-act drama	
2019	Angel's Last Mission: Love	Lee Yeon-seo		
2020–2021	Mr. Queen	Kim So-yong / Queen Cheorin / Jang Bong-hwan		
2023	See You in My 19th Life	Ban Ji-eum / Yoon Joo-won		
2023–2024	Welcome to Samdal-ri	Cho Eun-hye / Cho Sam-dal		
2024	Dear Hyeri	Joo Eun-ho / Joo Hye-ri		
2026	The Art of Sarah	Sarah Kim / Mok Ga-hui / Du-a / Kim Eun-jae / Kim Mi-jeong		
2026	Filing for Love	Joo In-ah		

=== Television shows ===
Year	Title	Role	Notes	Ref.
2018	Hope for Children in Global Village	Visitor / Narrator	Episode 14 – "MBC x Good Neighbors USA: Cameroon"	
2019	1919–2019, Memories	Narrator	Episode 2 – "Kim Hyang-hwa"	
2024	Meeting You	Narrator	Season 4 – "Thirteen, Sixteen"	

=== Web shows ===
Year	Title	Role	Notes	Ref.
2021	Saturday Night Live Korea	Host	Episode 1 – Season 2	

=== Hosting ===
Year	Title	Role	Notes	Ref.
2018	2018 SBS Drama Awards	Co-host	With Shin Dong-yup and Lee Je-hoon	
2019	2019 KBS Drama Awards	Co-host	With Jun Hyun-moo	

=== Music video appearances ===
Year	Title	Artist	Ref.
2013	"Curious"	What Women Want ft. Jung-yup from Brown Eyed Soul	
2018	"Feel Like"	Naul	
2018	"Snowfall"	g.o.d	

== Accolades ==
=== Awards and nominations ===
Name of the award ceremony, year presented, category, nominee of the award, and the result of the nomination
Award ceremony	Year	Category	Nominee / Work	Result	Ref.
APAN Star Awards	2018	Top Excellence Award, Actress in a Serial Drama	My Golden Life	Won	
Baeksang Arts Awards	2018	Best Actress – Television	My Golden Life	Nominated	
Baeksang Arts Awards	2021	Best Actress – Television	Mr. Queen	Nominated	
Baeksang Arts Awards	2021	Best New Actress – Film	Innocence	Nominated	
Baeksang Arts Awards	2026	Best Actress – Television	The Art of Sarah	Nominated	
Blue Dragon Film Awards	2021	Best New Actress	Innocence	Nominated	
Blue Dragon Series Awards	2026	Best Actress	The Art of Sarah	Won	
Buil Film Awards	2024	Star of the Year Award (Female)	Following	Won	
Director's Cut Awards	2025	Best Actress (Film)	Following	Nominated	
Global OTT Awards	2026	Best Leading Actress	The Art of Sarah	Won	
KBS Drama Awards	2016	Best New Actress	Five Enough	Nominated	
KBS Drama Awards	2016	Best Supporting Actress	Five Enough	Nominated	
KBS Drama Awards	2017	Best Couple Award	Shin Hye-sun (with Park Si-hoo); My Golden Life	Won	
KBS Drama Awards	2017	Excellence Award, Actress in a Serial Drama	My Golden Life	Won	
KBS Drama Awards	2017	Top Excellence Award, Actress	My Golden Life	Nominated	
KBS Drama Awards	2019	Best Couple Award	Shin Hye-sun (with Kim Myung-soo); Angel's Last Mission: Love	Won	
KBS Drama Awards	2019	Top Excellence Award, Actress	Angel's Last Mission: Love	Won	
KBS Drama Awards	2019	Excellence Award, Actress in a Miniseries	Angel's Last Mission: Love	Nominated	
Korean Association of Film Critics Awards	2026	OTT Series Best Actress	The Art of Sarah	Won	
Korea Drama Awards	2018	Top Excellence Award, Actress	My Golden Life	Nominated	
Korean Film Producers Association Awards	2021	Close-up Award	Shin Hye-sun	Won	
MBC Drama Awards	2015	Best New Actress in a Miniseries	She Was Pretty	Nominated	
SBS Drama Awards	2016	Excellence Award, Actress in a Fantasy Drama	The Legend of the Blue Sea	Nominated	
SBS Drama Awards	2018	Top Excellence Award, Actress in a Monday-Tuesday Drama	Still 17	Won	
SBS Drama Awards	2018	Best Couple Award	Shin Hye-sun (with Yang Se-jong); Still 17	Nominated	
Scene Stealer Festival	2016	Rookie of the Year	Five Enough and A Violent Prosecutor	Won	
The Seoul Awards	2017	Best New Actress	Stranger	Nominated	
The Seoul Awards	2018	Best Actress	My Golden Life and Still 17	Nominated	
Seoul International Drama Awards	2019	Best Actress	The Hymn of Death	Nominated	

=== State honors ===
Name of country, organization, year given, and name of honor
Country	Organization	Year	Honor or Award	Ref.
South Korea	National Tax Service	2024	Presidential Commendation	

=== Listicles ===
Name of publisher, year listed, name of listicle, and placement
Publisher	Year	Listicle	Placement	Ref.
Forbes	2024	Korea Power Celebrity 40	40th	
Korean Film Council	2021	Korean Actors 200 (Note: Introduces 200 actors that best represent the present and future of Korean cinema to the people in the film industry all over the world.)	Included	
