= Yang Se-jong =

South Korean actor and model (born 1992)

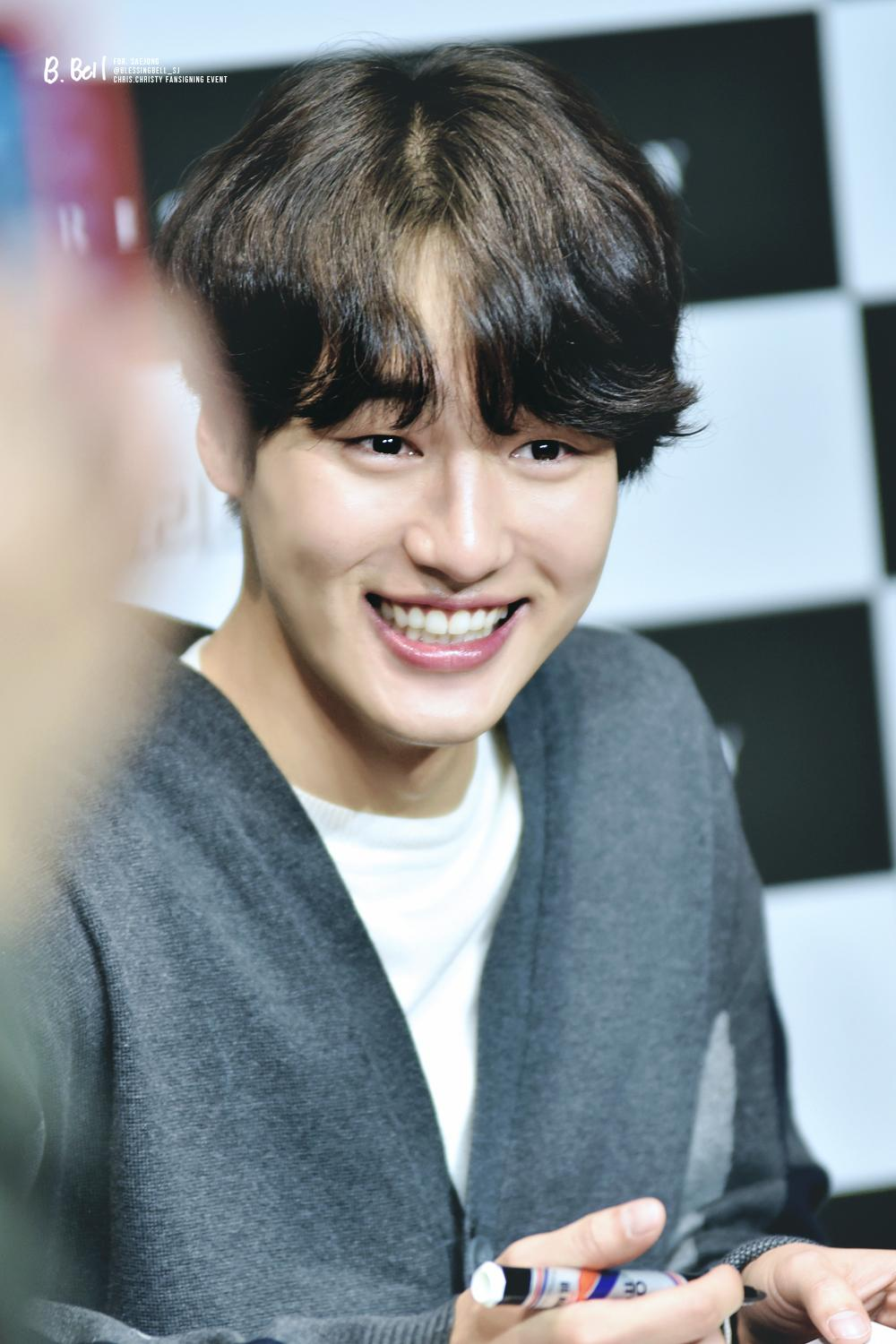
- Yang in 2017
- Born: December 23, 1992 (age 33); Anyang, Gyeonggi, South Korea
- Education: Korea National University of Arts
- Occupations: Actor; model
- Years active: 2016–present
- Agent: Zion Entertainment

Korean name
- Hangul: 양세종
- RR: Yang Sejong
- MR: Yang Sejong

Yang Se-jong (Korean: 양세종; born December 23, 1992) is a South Korean actor and model. Yang had his breakthrough role as a young chef in the 2017 romance drama Temperature of Love which won him several Best New Actor awards. His other works included the television series Dr. Romantic (2016), Saimdang, Memoir of Colors (2017), Duel (2017), Still 17 (2018), My Country: The New Age (2019), Doona! (2023) and Low Life (2025).

== Early life and education ==
Yang was born on December 23, 1992, in Anyang, Gyeonggi. In his first two years of high school, Yang worked at a book and DVD rental store as a part-time job. While in his second year of high school, Yang began to dream of becoming an actor after watching school plays with his friends. Before choosing acting as his career, Yang participated in taekwondo competitions and received a scholarship from the Samsung Foundation to attend a sports university which he turned down to focus on acting lesson. He worked as a fashion model in 2011 for a short period. In 2012, Yang enrolled in Korea National University of Arts, majoring in theater and film.

== Career ==
After a month of finishing filming for Saimdang, Memoir of Colors, Yang auditioned for Dr. Romantic and got cast in the hit medical drama, which marked his acting debut. He attracted attention after playing the role of Yoo Yeon-seok's rival. In January 2017, Yang played the roles of young Song Seung-heon and Lee Young-ae's assistant in SBS's historical drama Saimdang, Memoir of Colors. The same year, he starred in OCN's sci-fi thriller Duel, gaining praise for his portrayal of three different characters. He then starred in the romance series Temperature of Love by Ha Myung-hee, which won him the Best New Actor award at the SBS Drama Awards, 54th Baeksang Arts Awards and the 6th APAN Star Awards. Following his acting roles, Yang experienced a rise in popularity and was labeled "monster rookie" by the press. Yang was included in the 2017 Forbes Korea 2030 Power Leaders List placing fourth for his outstanding performance starring in four dramas in the first year of his acting career.

In 2018, Yang was cast in the romance comedy drama Still 17, playing the role of a stage designer who suffers a trauma at the age of seventeen. Yang won the Excellence Award at the SBS Drama Awards for his performance. In 2019, Yang joined tvN reality show Coffee Friends, a project to raise awareness toward giving and aiding others, small amounts at a time. In the same year, he starred in the historical action drama My Country: The New Age. In 2020, Yang's old agency contract expired during his military service. In 2021, Yang signed with new agency Blossom Entertainment. In 2022, Yang was confirmed to star in Netflix original drama Doona! (2023) and it became his comeback project after mandatory military service. In 2023, Yang moved to a newly established agency following the conclusion of his contract with Blossom Entertainment.

== Personal life ==
=== Military service ===
On May 12, 2020, Yang enlisted for his mandatory military service at the 27th Division in Hwacheon, Gangwon Province. On November 1, 2021, it was reported that Yang would be discharged from mandatory military service on November 15, 2021, without returning to the unit after his last vacation in accordance with the Ministry of Defense guidelines for preventing the spread of COVID-19.

== Filmography ==
=== Film ===
Year	Title	Role	Notes	Ref.
2013	The Voice From Inside		Short film	
2013	Things We Don't Know		Short film	
2025	Run to the West	Jae-beom		

=== Television series ===
Year	Title	Role	Notes	Ref.
2016–2020	Dr. Romantic	Do In-beom	Season 1–2; (Cameo, episode 15)	
2017	Saimdang, Memoir of Colors	young Lee Gyum / Han Sang-hyun		
2017	Duel	Lee Sung-joon / Lee Sung-hoon / Lee Yong-seob		
2017	Temperature of Love	On Jung-seon		
2018	Still 17	Gong Woo-jin		
2019	My Country: The New Age	Seo Hwi		
2026	Spooky in Love	Ma Kang-wook		

=== Web series ===
Year	Title	Role	Notes	Ref.
2023	Doona!	Lee Won-jun		
2025	Low Life	Oh Hee-dong		

=== Television show ===
Year	Title	Role	Notes	Ref.
2019	Coffee Friends	Cast member	with Son Ho-jun Yoo Yeon-seok and Choi Ji-woo	

== Theater ==
Year	Title	Role	Notes	Ref.
2014	Time to go to school, Alice		Seoul Fringe Festival	

== Accolades ==
=== Awards and nominations ===
Name of the award ceremony, year presented, category, nominee of the award, and the result of the nomination
Award ceremony	Year	Category	Nominee / Work	Result	Ref.
APAN Star Awards	2023	Excellence Award, Actor in a Miniseries	Doona!	Nominated	
APAN Star Awards	2018	Best New Actor	Temperature of Love	Won	
APAN Star Awards	2018	K-Star Award	Temperature of Love	Nominated	
Asia Artist Awards	2020	Popularity Award (Actor)	Yang Se-jong	Nominated	
Baeksang Arts Awards	2018	Best New Actor – Television	Temperature of Love	Won	
Director's Cut Awards	2026	Best Actor in a Series	Low Life	Nominated	
Korea First Brand Awards	2024	Best Actor (OTT)	Doona!	Nominated	
SBS Drama Awards	2017	Best New Actor	Temperature of Love	Won	
SBS Drama Awards	2017	Best Couple Award	Yang Se-jong (with Seo Hyun-jin); Temperature of Love	Nominated	
SBS Drama Awards	2018	Excellence Award, Actor in a Monday-Tuesday Drama	Still 17	Won	
SBS Drama Awards	2018	Best Couple Award	Yang Se-jong (with Shin Hye-sun); Still 17	Nominated	
Soompi Awards	2018	Breakout Actor Award	Temperature of Love	Nominated	
The Seoul Awards	2017	Best New Actor (Drama)	Saimdang, Memoir of Colors	Nominated	

=== Listicles ===
Name of publisher, year listed, name of listicle, and placement
Publisher	Year	Listicle	Placement	Ref.
Forbes	2018	30 Under 30 Asia	Placed	
