= Jo Hyun-sik =

South Korean actor

- Born: March 13, 1983 (age 43); Seoul, South Korea
- Other name: Cho Hyun-sik
- Occupation: Actor
- Years active: 2004–present
- Agent: Saetbyul-dang Entertainment

Korean name
- Hangul: 조현식
- RR: Jo Hyeonsik
- MR: Cho Hyŏnsik

Jo Hyun-sik (born March 13, 1983) is a South Korean actor.

== Filmography ==
=== Television series ===
Year	Title	Role	Notes/Ref.
2013	KBS Drama Special		Episode "Chagall's Birthday"
2014	KBS Drama Special	Byung-hoon	Episode "I'm Dying Soon"
2014	Misaeng: Incomplete Life	Kim Seok-ho	
2014	Love & Secret	Secretary Jang	
2015	Run Towards Tomorrow	Kim Ho-dong	
2015	High-End Crush		Web drama
2015	Six Flying Dragons	Beggar leader	
2016	Another Miss Oh	Sang-seok	
2016	The Doctors	Ahn Joong-dae	
2016	Guardian: The Lonely and Great God	Batch 21 Grim Reaper	
2017	Good Manager	Won Ki-ok	
2017	Strongest Deliveryman	Kim Gil-yong	Cameo
2017	Children of the 20th Century	Driver	
2017	Go Back	Ban-do's senior in civil engineering department in 1999 / Insurance agent in 2017	
2018	Still 17	Han Deok-soo	
2018	100 Days My Prince	Eunuch Yang Nae-kwan	
2018	The Beauty Inside	Courier	Cameo
2018	My Strange Hero	Ma Young-joon	
2019	Nokdu Flower	Eok Soe	
2019	Hotel del Luna	Hotel Guest	Cameo
2020	Men Are Men	Kang Eun-jae	
2022	Doctor Lawyer	Kang Dae-woong	

=== Film ===
Year	Title	Role	Notes
2014	My Love, My Bride	Blind date man	
2016	Seondal: The Man Who Sells the River	Dampago Warehouse guard	
2017	The Chase	young Mr. Choi	
2018	Feng Shui	Jang Soon-gyu	
2018	Taxing Day	A brave citizen	short film
2019	I Am Home	Kyung-sik	
2019	My Bossy Girl	Judo team leader	
2019	The Snob	Hyun-sik	
2021	Tomb of the River		

== Musical ==
Year	Title	Original title	Role
2004	Mirror Princess Pyeonggang Story	거울공주 평강이야기	Jin
2012	Hello Fine Day	헬로 파인데이	Ni Hoon-ah
2021	Hometown Spring	고향의 봄	

== Theater ==
Year	Title	Original title	Role
2008	Go Parade 1. We Go to Karaoke ... Can I Talk to You?	간다 퍼레이드1. 우리 노래방 가서...얘기 좀 할까?	Father
2008		우르르~간다! 세 번째 <내 마음의 안나푸르나>	Multi-Man
2009	Rooftop Room Cat	옥탑방 고양이	Moong-chi
2010	Family Arcade	가족오락관	Son (Myung-jin)
2012	The Art of Seduction	작업의 정석	Multi-Man
2012	Together with You	너와 함께라면	Barbers employee
2013	Swashbuckler	칼잡이	Multi
2013	Almost Maine	올모스트 메인	
2014	Judo Boy	유도소년	Tae-goo
