= HMLYCP =

2023 South Korean television entertainment program

- Promotional poster
- Also known as: HyeMiLeeYeChaePa
- Hangul: 혜미리예채파
- RR: Hyemiriyechaepa
- MR: Hyemiriyech'aep'a
- Genre: Reality show; Variety show
- Developed by: Park Jong-hoon (Planning)
- Written by: Cho Mi-hyun; Noh Kyungeun; Kim Min-ryeong; Cho Hee-jung; Lim Sae-byul; Jeon Hee-ju; Hoo Yun
- Directed by: Lee Tae-kyung
- Starring: Lee Hye-ri; Cho Mi-yeon; Leejung Lee; Choi Ye-na; Kim Chae-won; Patricia Yiombi
- Country of origin: South Korea
- Original language: Korean

Production
- Executive producer: Kim Tae-ho
- Producers: Kim Jong-moo (PD); Yoo Chang-sub (CP)
- Production company: TEO

Original release
- Network: ENA
- Release: March 12, 2023

HMLYCP (Korean: 혜미리예채파; RR: Hyemiriyechaepa, stylized as HyeMiLeeYeChaePa) is a South Korean reality-variety show that aired on ENA from March 12, 2023 to May 28, 2023 every Sunday at 19:50 (KST). It premiered on Netflix in March for audiences from South Korea.

== Background ==
HMLYCP is an entertainment show that captures the complex life of the Hye-Mi-Lee-Ye-Chae-Pa group struggling to settle comfortably in a remote mountain village. Put together to an empty house, Lee Hye-ri, I-dle's Cho Mi-yeon, Leejung Lee, Choi Ye-na, Le Sserafim's Kim Chae-won, and Patricia Yiombi must participate in various games to earn cash points, which can be used to purchase items to fill up the house. Under the slogan of 'from no ownership to full ownership', they provide entertainment and show their true personalities.

== Cast and characters ==
Name	Notes
Lee Hyeri	Debuting as the youngest member of the girl group Girl's Day in 2010, Hyeri, who will form the core of Hyemiriyechaepa, has appeared in the dramas Reply 1988, Two Cops, May I Help You?, movie My Punch-Drunk Boxer, and variety show Real Men, Amazing Saturday, etc.. She has been active as a 'power entertainer' for 12 years since her debut, going back and forth between dramas, movies, and entertainment. "Hyeri's older sister beauty, who always played the role of the youngest in power", is one of the points expected by producer Lee Tae-kyung.
Cho Miyeon	Cho Miyeon is a member of famous Korean girl group I-dle and the second oldest in the show after Hyeri. It is expected that she will show her unexpectedly funny side. She has been given the title goddess and princess from PD Lee Taekyung. Expectations are rising as to what kind of transformation Miyeon, who dominates the music charts, will show off in her variety shows by excluding her eight-color charm on stage.
Leejung Lee	Lee Jung is the leader of the dance crew YGX, boasting her presence as a key player in the Street Woman Fighter that caused the dance craze in Korea. She plans to show off her candid and confident charm as a human ENTP. Throughout the show, she unexpectedly showed her foolishness.
Choi Yena	Choi Ye-na, a solo artist and a former member of the girl group Iz*One, and a representative of her lovely visuals and positive energy, has established herself as a 'next-generation entertainment idol' by receiving love calls from a number of entertainment programs such as Girls High School Mystery Class and Family Register Mate. She is the 'hard carry' (the member who lead the group to victory) of the group and the mischievous member of the group. She is also in charge of cuteness in the group.
Kim Chaewon	Kim Chae-won is a member and leader of Le Sserafim as well as a former Iz*One member. As the fifth member of the show, she is best known for her artistic sense in her appearances on Amazing Saturday. She is also the only introvert of all the cast members, which sometimes ends up with her barely being able to keep up with everyone else's energy; as a result, she's usually the most quiet when in the group. However, she also displays a hidden competitive side, which sometimes can lead to angry and hilarious outbursts during morning games.
Patricia Yiombi	Patricia Yiombi, who showed the charm of a K-Congo sibling with her brother Jonathan, is a YouTuber and broadcaster who boasts proven speaking skills and entertainment skills. Patricia is expected to show off her performance as the youngest member of the Congolese duo in the show, adding to the anticipation that she will shine her indispensable presence and chemistry in the team.

== Episodes ==
No.	Title	Original release date
1	"Episode 1"	March 12, 2023
2	"Episode 2"	March 19, 2023
3	"Episode 3"	March 26, 2023
4	"Episode 4"	April 2, 2023
5	"Episode 5"	April 9, 2023
6	"Episode 6"	April 16, 2023
7	"Episode 7"	April 23, 2023
8	"Episode 8"	April 30, 2023
9	"Episode 9"	May 7, 2023
10	"Episode 10"	May 14, 2023
11	"Episode 11"	May 21, 2023
12	"Episode 12"	May 28, 2023

== Production ==
This is the first entertainment program from PD Lee Tae-kyung, who led Amazing Saturday, after moving to PD Kim Tae-ho's production company, TEO, and also the second project to launch by Kim's division on ENA along with Earth Globe Tour.

The program is scheduled to be broadcast in March.

The program was first announced on January 31, 2023, with the list of the cast Lee Hye-ri, Cho Mi-yeon, Leejung Lee, Choi Ye-na, Kim Chae-won, and Patricia. In choosing Lee Hye-ri, PD Lee Tae-kyung noted that he had met her for the second time after Amazing Saturday, "[She] has very outstanding abilities. It requires brains, but Hyeri shows it to an amazing extent. She is also a really great player who has the ability to create characters for the people around her. I really wanted to do the project again." This program marks Cho Mi-yeon's first fixed variety show.

On February 17, 2023, the first teaser of the show was released. A second season was hinted at in the final episode of season 1, but no official announcement has been made since the first season's conclusion.
