= My Roommate Is a Gumiho =

2021 South Korean fantasy television series

- Promotional poster
- Hangul: 간 떨어지는 동거
- Hanja: 肝 떨어지는 同居
- Lit.: Frightening Cohabitation
- RR: Gan tteoreojineun donggeo
- MR: Kan ttŏrŏjinŭn tonggŏ
- Genre: Romantic comedy; Fantasy
- Created by: Studio Dragon; iQiyi
- Based on: My Roommate Is a Gumiho (webtoon) by Na
- Written by: Baek Sun-Woo; Choi Bo-Rim
- Directed by: Nam Sung-Woo; Park Joon Hwa
- Starring: Jang Ki-yong; Lee Hye-ri; Kang Han-na
- Composer: Moon Sang-nam
- Countries of origin: South Korea; China
- Original language: Korean
- No. of episodes: 16

Production
- Executive producer: Jang Jeong-do
- Producers: Park Joon-seo; Han Seok-won
- Running time: 70 minutes
- Production companies: Drama House; Contents Zium; JTBC Studios

Original release
- Network: TVN
- Release: May 26 – July 15, 2021

My Roommate Is a Gumiho (Korean: 간 떨어지는 동거) is a 2021 South Korean television drama series starring Jang Ki-yong and Lee Hye-ri. The series tells story of romance between a 999-year-old kumiho named Shin Woo-Yeo and a female college student named Lee Dam who accidentally swallows Shin Woo-Yeo's bead. It premiered on streaming platform iQiyi worldwide and cable channel TVN on May 26, 2021, and aired on Wednesday and Thursday at 22.40 (KST) for 16 episodes until July 15.

The series ended on July 15, 2021, with its last episode recording an average nationwide viewership ratings of 4%. It attained an average viewership of 948 thousand per episode during its broadcast.

== Synopsis ==
Based on an original webtoon, the drama tells a story of a male kumiho who has lived for hundreds of years to become a human being. When his fox beads are taken away by a female college student in an accident, they live together in his house to solve this problem.

== Cast ==
=== Main ===
- Jang Ki-yong as Shin Woo-yeo

A 999-year-old Gumiho who wants to become a human.

- Lee Hye-ri as Lee Dam

A college student born in 1999 who accidentally swallows a fox bead and has never been in a relationship before.

- Kang Han-na as Yang Hye-sun

Shin Woo-yeo's slow-witted friend who is a romance expert. She used to be Gumiho for 700 years, but has now turned into a human.

- Kim Do-wan as Do Jae-jin

Dam and Soo-kyung's friend who develops a romantic relationship with Yang Hye-sun after being dumped by his ex-girlriend.

=== Supporting ===
- Bae In-hyuk as Gye Sun-woo

Lee Dam's senior in college who is a ladies' favorite. He develops interest on Lee Dam because she keeps on avoiding him. Later they also get tied by a red thread of destiny but eventually it cuts off as Sun-woo leaves the country for higher study.

- Park Kyung-hye as Choi Soo-kyung

Lee Dam's and Do Jae-jin's best friend.

- Choi Woo-sung as Lee Dan

Lee Dam's younger brother

- Kim Do-yeon as Gye Seo-woo

Gye Sun-woo's younger sister.

- Kim Kang-min as Jung Seok

Lee Dam, Choi Soo-kyung and Do Jae-jin's senior.

- Bang Eun-jung as Jeon Da-young

=== Special appearances ===
- Lee Kyu-sung as Mountain Spirit Transformation
- Jung So-min as Seo-hwa

The woman Shin Woo-yeo loved in the past and left a lasting impression. She was his first love who lost her life because of the fox bead Woo-yeo transferred into her.

- Kim Eung-soo as Shin Woo-yeo's transformation (ep. 1)
- Han Ji-eun as leader of publishing company (ep. 1, 5–6)
- Go Kyung-pyo as Sansin, a mountain spirit that watches over Shin Woo-yeo and Lee Dam (ep. 7, 10, 11, 13, 14)
- Jang Sung-kyu as Lee Dam's blind date and Do Jae-jin's senior who appears in Episode 6. He is an arrogant man who looked down on Lee Dam during their first meet and fell down on the floor due to Shin Woo-yeo's magic.
- Oh Hyun-kyung as Kim Hyun-kyung (ep. 6)

Lee Dam and Lee Dan's mother who works as a fashion magazine editor.

- Kang Mi-na as Choi Jin-ah (ep. 8, 11)

Do Jae-jin's ex-girlfriend.

- Son Seong-yoon as Seo Young-joo, a professor of ancient history at Seogwan University
- Lee Jun-hyuk as Professor Park Bo-gum

A professor who is known for his rigor in the history department.

- Oh Jung-se as Do Jae-gang, Jae-jin's brother
- Shim Hyung-tak as Gye Sun-woo's uncle who owns a restaurant

== Production ==
My Roommate is a Gumiho is the first South Korean drama produced by iQiyi. It was a joint production between China and South Korea. Lee Hye-ri and Jang Ki-yong both starred in Schoolgirl Detectives previously. The former and Park Kyung-hye also previously worked together in a workplace-themed drama Miss Lee. Kang Han-na and Kim Do-wan previously starred together in the 2020 drama Start-Up.

== Original soundtrack ==
My Roommate Is a Gumiho

Soundtrack album by Various
- Released: 2021
- Genre: Soundtrack
- Languages: Korean; English
- Labels: JTBC Studios; Kakao

=== Part 1 ===
Released on May 27, 2021
No.	Title	Lyrics	Music	Artist	Length
1.	"Door (Your Moon)"	Park Jang-hyun (Somebody's Tale); Kim Jae-won; Glody	Park Jang-hyun (Somebody's Tale); Glody	Jeong Se-woon	3:49
2.	"Door (Your Moon)" (Inst.)		Park Jang-hyun (Somebody's Tale); Glody		3:49

=== Part 2 ===
Released on June 3, 2021
No.	Title	Lyrics	Music	Artist	Length
1.	"My All" (우연이 아닌것만 같아서)	Hana	Tom With Jerry; Choi Jae-hyuk; Lee Yong-min; Moon Sung-hye	Kim Na-young	3:34
2.	"My All" (Inst.)		Tom With Jerry; Choi Jae-hyuk; Lee Yong-min; Moon Sung-hye		3:34

=== Part 3 ===
Released on June 10, 2021
No.	Title	Lyrics	Music	Artist	Length
1.	"Drawing of the Beginning" (시작의 드로잉)	Pink Moon	Pink Moon	Yoo Yeon-jung (WJSN)	3:24
2.	"Drawing of the Beginning" (Inst.)		Pink Moon		3:24

=== Part 4 ===
Released on June 18, 2021
No.	Title	Lyrics	Music	Artist	Length
1.	"One Step Closer" (한 걸음 가까이)	Kim Seung-jun (Psycho Tension)	Psycho Tension (Kim Seung-jun, Choi Mi-hyun, Yoon Seok-ju)	Choi Nakta	4:06
2.	"One Step Closer" (Inst.)		Psycho Tension (Kim Seung-jun, Choi Mi-hyun, Yoon Seok-ju)		4:06

=== Part 5 ===
Released on June 24, 2021
No.	Title	Lyrics	Music	Artist	Length
1.	"Nothing Left To Say" (어떤 말도 할 수가 없는 나인데)	Yountoven; Doctor Son	Doctor Son; Yountoven; Yoon Da-eun	Kassy	4:16
2.	"Nothing Left To Say" (Inst.)		Doctor Son; Yountoven; Yoon Da-eun		4:16

=== Part 6 ===
Released on July 1, 2021
No.	Title	Lyrics	Music	Artist	Length
1.	"Next To You" (그댈 담은 밤)	Hana	Tom With Jerry	Yang Da-il	4:35
2.	"Next To You" (Inst.)		Tom With Jerry		4:35

=== Part 7 ===
Released on July 8, 2021
No.	Title	Lyrics	Music	Artist	Length
1.	"You & I" (그대와)	Kim Dong-joon; Yoo Min-gyu	Kim Dong-joon; Yoo Min-gyu	Choi Young-jae (Got7), So-yeon (Laboum)	3:38
2.	"You & I" (Inst.)		Kim Dong-joon; Yoo Min-gyu		3:38

=== Part 8 ===
Released on July 15, 2021
No.	Title	Lyrics	Music	Artist	Length
1.	"Moon" (달 (치즈))	Moonchong	Moonchong; Midnight	Cheeze	3:53
2.	"Moon" (Inst.)				3:53

=== Part 9 ===
Released on July 22, 2021
No.	Title	Lyrics	Music	Artist	Length
1.	"Big Change"	Moon Seong-nam	Moon Seong-nam	Jung Yu-ji	3:18
2.	"Big Change" (Inst.)				3:18

== Viewership ==
My Roommate Is a Gumiho : South Korea viewers per episode (thousands)

Season	Episode number																Average
Season	1	2	3	4	5	6	7	8	9	10	11	12	13	14	15	16	Average
1	1239	1057	923	1165	1069	886	786	949	839	867	845	854	820	871	909	1091	948

Source: Audience measurement performed nationwide by Nielsen Korea

Average TV viewership ratings
Ep.	Original broadcast date	Average audience share (Nielsen Korea)	
Ep.	Original broadcast date	Nationwide	Seoul
1	May 26, 2021	5.282% (1st)	5.888% (1st)
2	May 27, 2021	4.279% (1st)	4.838% (1st)
3	June 2, 2021	4.123% (2nd)	4.769% (2nd)
4	June 3, 2021	4.354% (1st)	4.670% (1st)
5	June 9, 2021	4.304% (1st)	4.882% (1st)
6	June 10, 2021	3.688% (2nd)	4.000% (2nd)
7	June 16, 2021	3.159% (2nd)	3.564% (2nd)
8	June 17, 2021	4.238% (2nd)	5.200% (2nd)
9	June 23, 2021	3.374% (1st)	3.460% (1st)
10	June 24, 2021	3.772% (2nd)	4.101% (2nd)
11	June 30, 2021	3.691% (1st)	4.092% (1st)
12	July 1, 2021	3.476% (2nd)	4.193% (2nd)
13	July 7, 2021	3.234% (2nd)	3.932% (2nd)
14	July 8, 2021	3.549% (2nd)	4.418% (2nd)
15	July 14, 2021	3.625% (2nd)	4.321% (2nd)
16	July 15, 2021	3.982% (2nd)	4.571% (2nd)
Average		3.883%	4.431%
In the table above, the blue numbers represent the lowest ratings and the red numbers represent the highest ratings.; This drama airs on a cable channel/pay TV which normally has a relatively smaller audience compared to free-to-air TV/public broadcasters (KBS, SBS, MBC and EBS).
