= Lee Hye-ri =

South Korean actress and singer (born 1994)

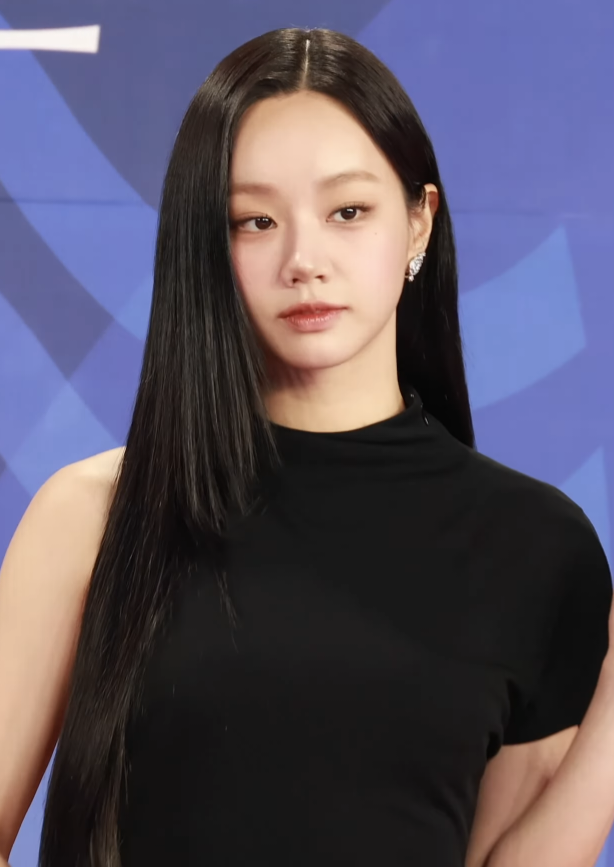
- Hyeri in July 2025
- Born: June 9, 1994 (age 32); Gwangju, Gyeonggi, South Korea
- Education: Konkuk University
- Occupations: Actress; singer
- Years active: 2010–present
- Agent: Sublime
- Awards: Full list
- Musical career
- Genre: K-pop
- Instrument: Vocals
- Label: Dream T
- Member of: Girl's Day

Korean name
- Hangul: 이혜리
- Hanja: 李惠利
- RR: I Hyeri
- MR: I Hyeri

Signature
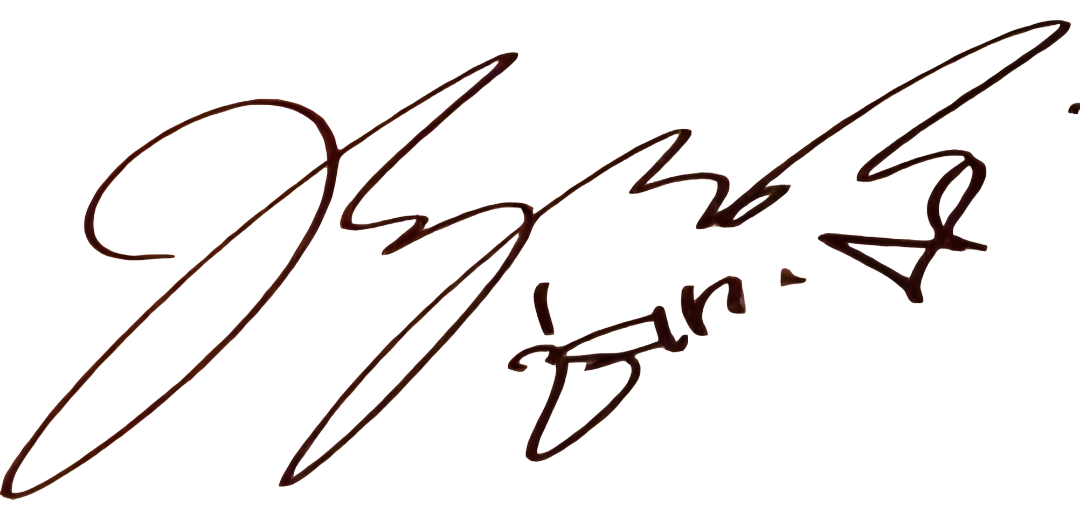

Lee Hye-ri (Korean: 이혜리; born June 9, 1994), better known mononymously as Hyeri, is a South Korean actress, singer, and television personality. She rose to fame as the youngest member of girl group Girl's Day, and was named the "Nation's Little Sister" by the South Korean media outlets after appearing as a fixed cast member on Real Men (2014).

Hyeri later became known as the female lead in Reply 1988 (2015), which was the highest-rated drama in Korean cable television history at the time. After back-to-back success in variety and the small screen, Hyeri ranked third in Forbes Korea Power Celebrity list in 2016 and became one of the highest-paid commercial models in South Korea.

Hyeri was a regular cast member on Amazing Saturday from 2018 until 2020 when she left the show to focus on her acting career. She has since starred in the IQIYI series My Roommate Is a Gumiho (2021) and U+ Mobile TV's Friendly Rivalry (2025).

== Early life and education ==
Hyeri was born in Gwangju, Gyeonggi, South Korea. She has a sister, Hye-rim, who is two years younger. Hyeri grew up in poverty, staying with her grandmother in the countryside while her mother was working in a factory.

When she was in middle school, Hyeri was scouted by Dream T Entertainment at a talent show and consequently joined Girl's Day with little prior training. She later attended Seoul School of Performing Arts, and then majored in film at Konkuk University.

== Career ==
=== 2010–present: Girl's Day ===
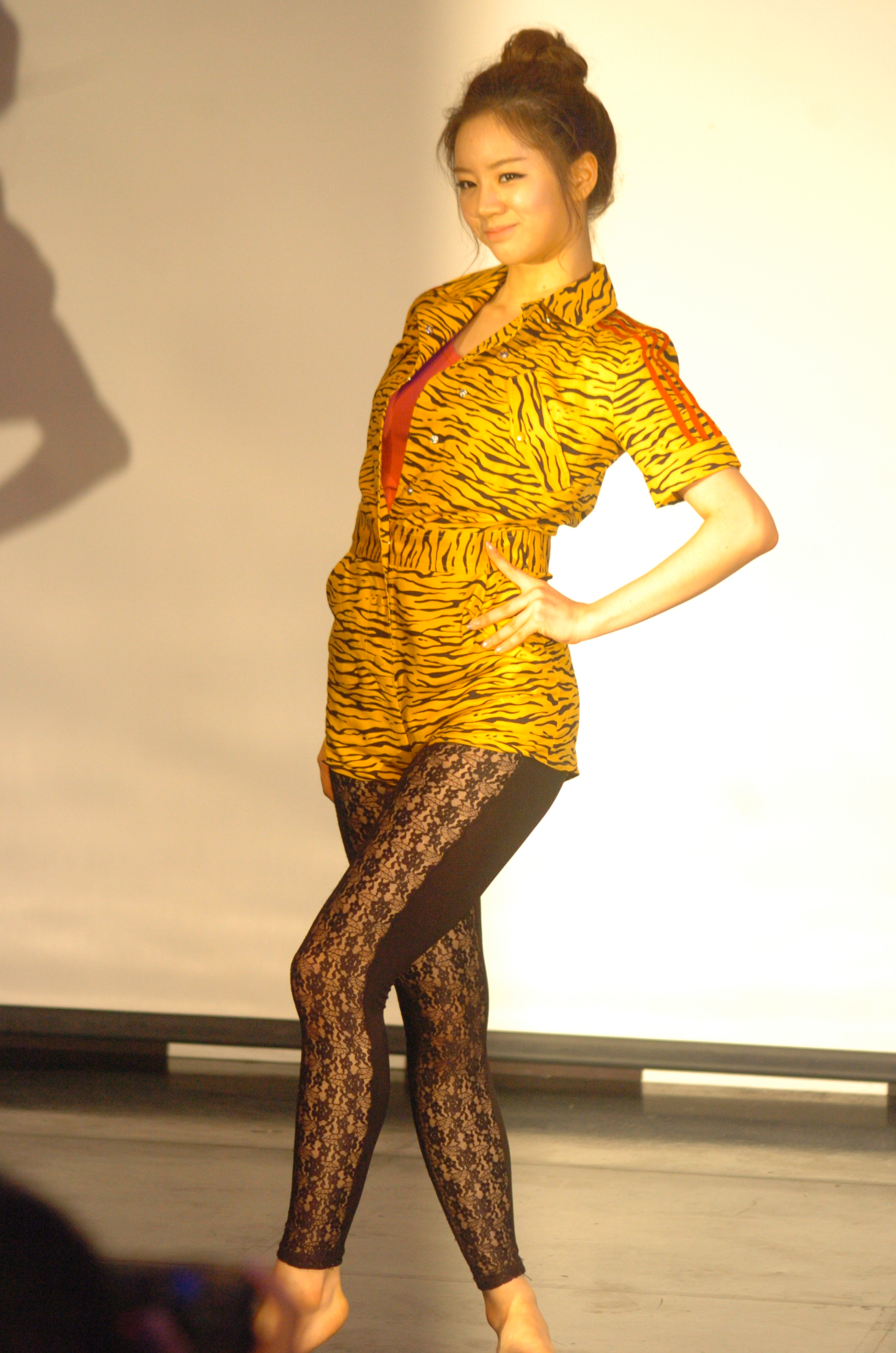
Hyeri performing in 2012

In September 2010, Hyeri was announced as a new member of Girl's Day alongside Yura when Jiin and Jisun left the group, just two months after the group debuted. The revamped group released a single titled "Nothing Lasts Forever", and went on to become one of the most popular and commercially successful musical quartets of its era.

In January 2014, Hyeri fainted on stage during a Girl's Day live performance and had to be carried off-stage by M Countdown staff. She was later diagnosed with swine flu.

After her exclusive contract with Dream T Entertainment ended in 2019, Hyeri joined a newly set-up agency Creative Group ING. Although all four members joined separate agencies, they have stated that the group has not disbanded.

=== 2012–2014: Acting debut and rising popularity ===
In 2012, Hyeri made her acting debut in the SBS weekend drama Tasty Life, where she played the youngest in a family of four daughters.

After her 4-day long appearance on Real Men in August 2014, a brief clip of her showing aegyo at her instructor went viral in South Korea, reaching one million views in a day, an unprecedented feat at the time. She consequently shot to stardom overnight, and later won Best Female Newcomer award at the MBC Entertainment Awards for her Real Men appearance.

In November 2014, Hyeri was cast as one of the main characters in teen drama Schoolgirl Detectives, which began airing on cable channel JTBC in December. In late 2014, she was also cast in the mystery rom-com drama Hyde Jekyll, Me, which began airing on SBS in January 2015.

=== 2015–present: Leading roles ===
In 2015, Hyeri was cast as the lead of the tvN drama Reply 1988. The drama premiered in November and went on to become a commercial success with audience ratings peaking at 18.8%, making it one of the highest rated dramas in Korean cable television history. Hyeri received critical and audience acclaim for her award-winning portrayal of the female protagonist. In the show, Hyeri's character was the Madagascar picket girl at the 1988 Summer Olympics Opening Ceremony. Due to the series' status as a cultural phenomenon, the actress was chosen by the Madagascar delegation to become its official flag bearer at the 2018 Winter Olympics opening ceremony. However, due to her busy schedule, Hyeri declined the offer.

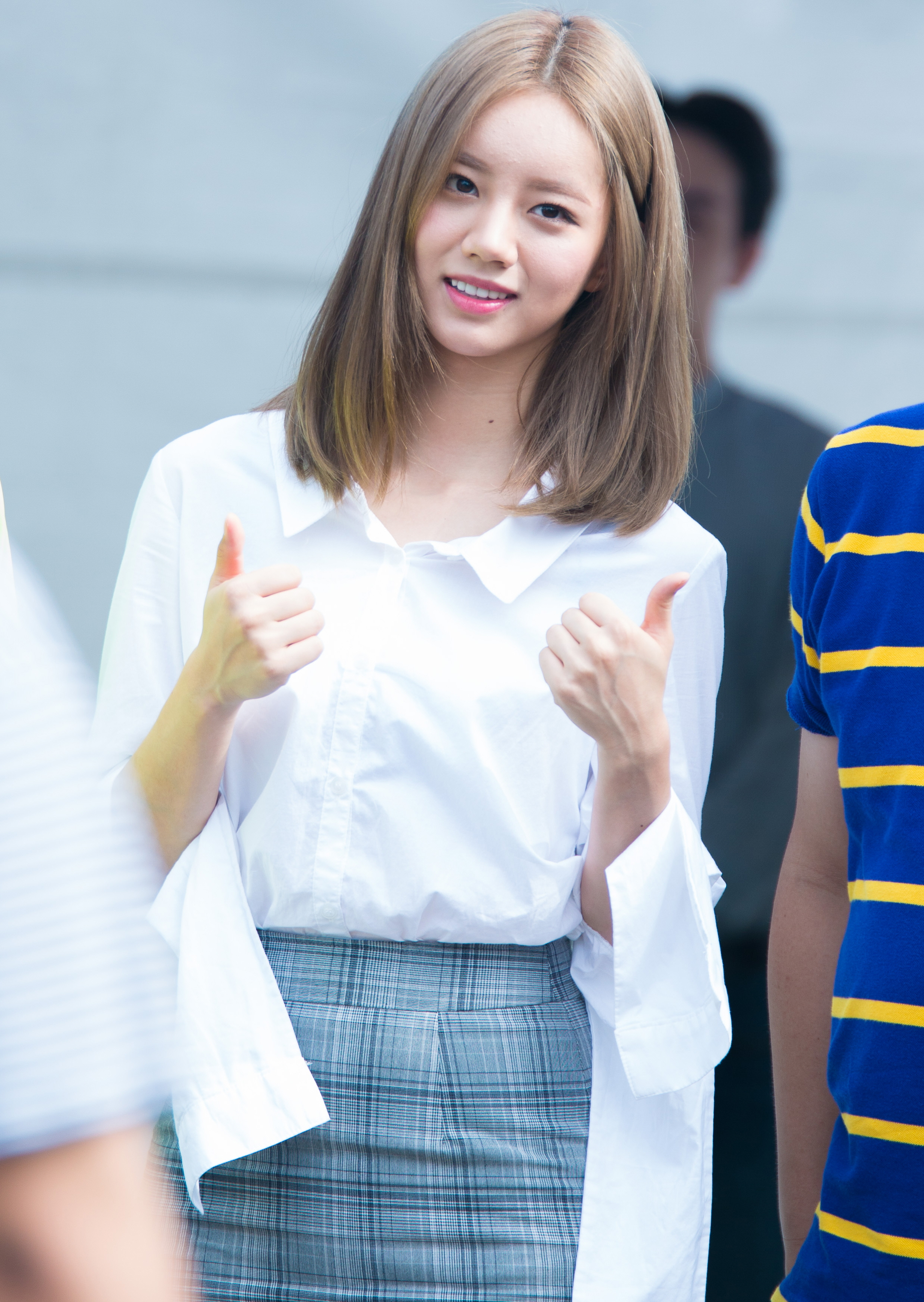
Hyeri at a fansigning event in 2016

In 2016, Hyeri was cast as the lead in the SBS drama Entertainer along with actor Ji Sung and CNBLUE member Kang Min-hyuk, which began airing on April 20 and for which she won "New Star Award" at 2016 SBS Drama Awards. In 2017, she also starred in the police comedy drama Two Cops alongside Jo Jung-suk and Kim Seon-ho.

In 2017, it was announced that Hyeri would be making her big screen debut as the female lead in Monstrum; filming began in April. Monstrum premiered in September, 2018. In 2018, Hyeri was cast in My Punch-Drunk Boxer, a boxing comedy drama film. The film premiered at 20th Jeonju International Film Festival in September, 2019; its general release followed in October, 2019. In 2019, Hyeri also starred in tvN's office comedy drama Miss Lee.

Besides acting, Hyeri frequently guests on variety shows. She has been described as a "blue chip" in the entertainment industry due to her "frank and easy-going charms, bright energy and flexible chemistry with other cast members". Since 2018, Hyeri had been a regular cast member of DoReMi Market, a weekly television program airing on tvN. In late 2020, she left the show to focus on her acting career.

In 2021, Hyeri starred in tvN's fantasy-romance drama My Roommate Is a Gumiho alongside Jang Ki-yong, produced by iQIYI. The series was a commercial success, amassing more than 100 million views on the online video platform and becoming its most-watched original drama series of the year. Later that year, Hyeri starred in KBS2's historical drama Moonshine alongside Yoo Seung-ho.

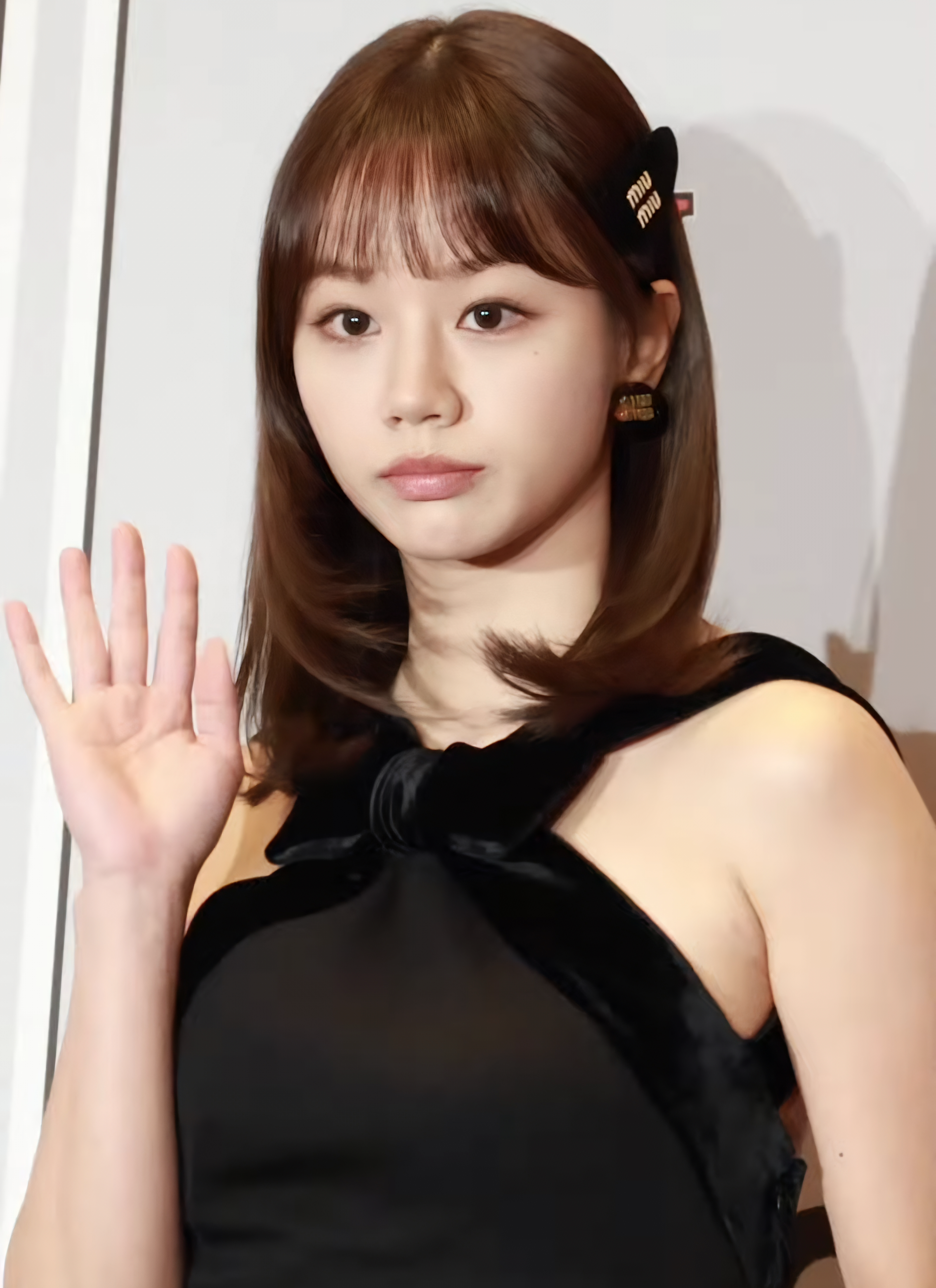
Hyeri at Love Your W event in 2023

In 2022, Hyeri starred in the television series May I Help You?. For her performance, she received the Excellence Award, Actress in a Miniseries at the 2022 MBC Drama Awards. Later in 2022, she hosted the 2022 KBS Drama Awards alongside Jun Hyun-moo and Jung Yong-hwa. During the ceremony, she was awarded the Excellence Award, Actress in a Miniseries for her role in Moonshine. In 2023, Hyeri starred in the ENA variety show HMLYCP.

On March 6, 2023, Hyeri was cast in the cheerleading movie Victory. The film premiered at the 23rd New York Asian Film Festival, where she was awarded with the Screen International Rising Star Asia Award for her performance in the film. She also earned a nominations for best new actress award in 61st Baeksang Arts Awards.

In November 2023, she was cast in the Netflix reality competition show Agents of Mystery. In June 2024, Hyeri signed with agency Sublime.

In 2025, Hyeri starred in the lead role in teen mystery thriller series Friendly Rivalry. Based on the webtoon of the same name by Song Chae-yoon and Shim Jae-young, it was released on U+ Mobile TV from February 10 to March 6, 2025, airing every Monday to Thursday. She portrayed Yoo Jae-yi, the school's top student with a perfect score on her CSAT test. Hyeri's performance in the series garnered critical and audience praise for her transformation into a calculating and mysterious character, a departure from her previous "bubbly girl" roles, and for exploring same-sex attraction. She earned a nomination for Best Actress at the 4th Blue Dragon Series Awards.

== Philanthropy ==
Hyeri was appointed as the ambassador for 'Free Semester Program' by the Ministry of Education in September 2016. In February 2017, Hyeri was appointed as one of the ambassadors for the Count Every Child birth registration campaign as part of her NGO partnership with Plan Korea. In 2018, Hyeri participated in a Plan Korea fundraiser for children born without birth registration and wrote a letter to fans asking for potential donors.

At 25 years old, Hyeri became the youngest member of UNICEF's Honors Club, having donated more than ₩100 million "to run educational programs for underprivileged children and AIDS-prevention campaigns in underdeveloped nations in Asia". A membership ceremony took place on July 26, 2019.

Throughout her career, Hyeri has donated to a wide variety of causes, ranging from public health to disaster management. On the Lunar New Year of 2016, Hyeri donated ₩50 million to Community Chest of Korea towards improving elderly welfare. Later that year, she donated ₩50 million to Korea Disaster Relief Organisation for the victims of the Seomun Market fire. In February 2020, Hyeri donated ₩100 million to Save the Children to help those affected by COVID-19.

In 2022, Hyeri donated ₩50 million to the Hope Bridge Disaster Relief Association to help the victims of the massive wildfire that started in Uljin, Gyeongbuk and has spread to Samcheok, Gangwon. That same year, Hyeri donated ₩50 million to the Save the Children emergency relief in order to help Ukrainian victims during the Russian invasion, stating that she "wants to give a little help to the suffering children who are powerless in times of war" and that she hopes "a world without war and fear will come one day".

In 2023, Hyeri donated 50 million won to help 2023 Turkey–Syria earthquake, by donating money through UNICEF's emergency relief program to help children affected by earthquakes in Turkey and Syria.

== In the media ==
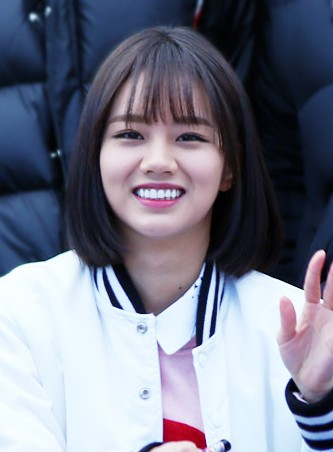
At Reply 1988 fan signing event in Ssangmun-dong, February 2016

=== Endorsements ===
The success of Reply 1988 combined with Hyeri's status as an icon of aegyo led to her becoming one of the most in-demand advertising models in South Korea. By the start of 2016, she had shot over 30 advertisements for brands such as Puma, Lotte Confectionery's Ghana, Bohae, Amore Pacific's Happy Bath, and was consequently given the title of "₩10 billion girl (100억 소녀)" by the South Korean media.

Following her appointment as the model for Albamon (알바몬), a part-time job recruiting site, Hyeri was awarded with the plaque of appreciation by the Ministry of Employment and Labour for "promoting minimum wage awareness and compliance" in March 2015. In January 2017, Albamon received "Consumer Choice Best Brand Award" for "its efforts to improve the rights of the public by providing high quality part-time job announcements" after an ad featuring Hyeri and Im Chang-jung reached over 10 million views in just a month after its release.

The sales of products such as 7-Eleven lunch boxes and Nongshim ramen increased by 78% and 50% respectively after Hyeri's endorsement. Similarly, the page views of Dabang (다방), a real estate mobile app that Hyeri has endorsed since 2015, grew from 5 million to 15 million, and weekly active users increased from 600,000 to 1.5 million after a new ad featuring Hyeri as Harley Quinn was released in 2017. In July 2017, she received the Female Commercial Film Star Award at MTN Broadcast Advertising Awards Festival.

=== Social media ===
In July 2019, Hyeri unveiled her personal YouTube channel, where she began posting vlogs, mukbangs, and behind the scenes footage from filming sets. A month later, she received The Silver Creator Award for surpassing 100,000 subscribers. In 2020, she was awarded the "Celebrity YouTuber of the Year" prize at the Brand of the Year Awards.

In March 2020, Hyeri criticised Nth room-related cybersex trafficking on her Instagram account and urged her followers to sign a petition to reveal the identities of the perpetrators, stating that she hopes that "they face harsher punishment for what they did".

== Personal life ==
In March 2016, Hyeri was hospitalised after being diagnosed with meningitis due to busy schedules and lack of rest. She was in a relationship with actor and Reply 1988 co-star Ryu Jun-yeol from late 2016 until November 2023.

== Discography ==
List of soundtrack appearance, showing year released, and name of the album
Title	Year	Album
"Hyehwa-dong (or Ssangmun-dong) (혜화동 (혹은 쌍문동))" (Ssangmun-dong Kids featuring Lee Hye-ri)	2025	Reply 1988 10th Anniversary OST

== Filmography ==
=== Film ===
Year	Title	Role	Ref.
2018	Monstrum	Myung	
2019	My Punch-Drunk Boxer	Minji	
2024	Victory	Chu Pil-seon	
TBA	Night Fever	A-ri	

=== Television series ===
Year	Title	Role	Notes	Ref.
2012	Tasty Life	Jang Mi-hyun		
2014–2015	Schoolgirl Detectives	Lee Ye-hee		
2015	Hyde Jekyll, Me	Min Woo-jung		
2015–2016	Reply 1988	Sung Duk-seon / Sung Soo-yeon		
2016	Entertainer	Jung Geu-rin		
2017–2018	Two Cops	Song Ji-an		
2019	Miss Lee	Lee Seon-shim		
2020	Record of Youth	Lee Hae-ji	Cameo (Ep.13)	
2021	My Roommate Is a Gumiho	Lee Dam		
2021–2022	Moonshine	Kang Ro-seo		
2022	May I Help You?	Baek Dong-ju		
2025	Friendly Rivalry	Yoo Je-yi		
2026	Dream to You	Joo Yi-jae		

=== Television shows ===
Year	Title	Role	Notes	Ref.
2014	Real Men	Cast member	Women's Army Special (Season 1)	
2018–2020	Amazing Saturday	Cast member		
2023	HMLYCP	Cast member		
2025–2026	Reply 1988 10th Anniversary	Cast member		

=== Web shows ===
Year	Title	Role	Ref.
2024–present	Hyell's Club	Host	
2024	Agents of Mystery	Cast member	

=== Music video appearances ===
Year	Title	Ref.
2013	"C-CLOWN(씨클라운) - Shaking Heart"	
2023	"Tabber - Being (feat. Yerin Baek) (Official Video)"	
2025	"Hyehwa-dong (or Ssangmun-dong)"	

=== Hosting ===
Year	Title	Notes	Ref.
2011	The Show	With BAP's Himchan (Season 1)	
2014	MBC Gayo Daejejeon	With Kim Sung-joo, Jun Hyun-moo, Soyou (Sistar), Lee Yoo-ri	
2014–2015	The Show	With T-ara's Jiyeon, Jung Wook (Season 3) and Super Junior-M's Zhou Mi (Season 4)	
2015	4th Gaon Chart Music Awards	With Leeteuk (Super Junior)	
2016	Idol Star Athletics Championships	With Jun Hyun-moo, Lee Soo-geun (Chuseok Special), Jo Kwon (Lunar New Year Special)	
2016	15th KBS Entertainment Awards	With Lee Hwi-jae and You Hee-yeol	
2018	2018 MBC Entertainment Awards	With Jun Hyun-moo, Seungri	
2022	2022 KBS Drama Awards	With Jun Hyun-moo and Jung Yong-hwa	

== Awards and nominations ==
Name of the award ceremony, year presented, category, nominee of the award, and the result of the nomination
Award ceremony	Year	Category	Nominee / Work	Result	Ref.
APAN Star Awards	2016	Best New Actress	Reply 1988	Won	
APAN Star Awards	2025	Best Couple Award	Lee Hye-ri (with Chung Su-bin); Friendly Rivalry	Won	
Asia Artist Awards	2016	Most Popular Actress	Reply 1988	Nominated	
Asia Artist Awards	2020	Most Popular Actress	Miss Lee	Nominated	
Asia Artist Awards	2021	Female Actress Popularity Award	Lee Hye-ri	Nominated	
Asia Artist Awards	2025	Best Actor – Female	Lee Hye-ri	Won	
Baeksang Arts Awards	2016	Best New Actress – Television	Reply 1988	Nominated	
Baeksang Arts Awards	2025	Best New Actress – Film	Victory	Nominated	
Blue Dragon Film Awards	2024	Best New Actress	Victory	Nominated	
Blue Dragon Series Awards	2025	Tirtir Popularity Award	Friendly Rivalry	Won	
Blue Dragon Series Awards	2025	Best Actress	Friendly Rivalry	Nominated	
Blue Dragon Series Awards	2025	Best Female Entertainer	Agents of Mystery	Nominated	
Brand Customer Loyalty Awards	2025	Female Celebrity YouTuber	Lee Hye-ri	Won	
Brand of the Year Awards	2019	Female Variety Idol	Lee Hye-ri	Won	
Brand of the Year Awards	2020	Celebrity YouTuber of the Year	Lee Hye-ri	Won	
Brand of the Year Awards	2021	Rising Star Actress	Lee Hye-ri	Won	
Brand of the Year Awards	2022	Rising Star Actress	Lee Hye-ri	Won	
Buil Film Awards	2025	Best New Actress	Victory	Won	
Buil Film Awards	2025	Star of the Year Award (Female)	Victory	Won	
Daum Awards	2015	Rising Idol Actress	Lee Hye-ri	Won	
DramaFever Awards	2016	Best Kiss	Lee Hye-ri (with Park Bo-gum); Reply 1988	Won	
Elle Style Awards	2024	Best Style Icon – Woman	Lee Hyeri	Won	
KBS Drama Awards	2022	Excellence Award, Actress in a Miniseries	Moonshine	Won	
KBS Drama Awards	2022	Popularity Award, Actress	Moonshine	Nominated	
Korea Drama Awards	2016	Best New Actress	Reply 1988	Nominated	
Korea Drama Awards	2025	Best Couple	Lee Hye-ri (with Chung Su-bin); Friendly Rivalry	Won	
Korea First Brand Awards	2018	Female Idol Variety Star	Lee Hye-ri	Won	
Korean Wave Awards	2016	Acting Award	Reply 1988	Won	
MBC Drama Awards	2017	Top Excellence Award, Actress in a Monday-Tuesday Drama	Two Cops	Nominated	
MBC Drama Awards	2017	Most Popular Actress	Two Cops	Nominated	
MBC Drama Awards	2022	Excellence Award, Actress in a Miniseries	May I Help You?	Won	
MBC Drama Awards	2022	Best Couple Award	Lee Hye-ri (with Lee Jun-young); May I Help You?	Nominated	
MBC Entertainment Awards	2014	Best Female Newcomer	Real Men: Female Special	Won	
MTN Broadcast Advertising Awards	2017	Female Commercial Film Star Award	Lee Hye-ri	Won	
New York Asian Film Festival	2024	Screen International Rising Star Asia Award	Victory	Won	
OBS Hot Icon Awards (Note: OBS Hot Icon Awards is an entertainment popularity award given by OBS Gyeongin TV since 2013.)	2014	OBS 2014 Hot Icon	Lee Hye-ri	Won	
SBS Drama Awards	2016	New Star Award	Entertainer	Won	
SBS Drama Awards	2016	Top Excellence Award, Actress in a Romantic-Comedy Drama	Entertainer	Nominated	
SEC Awards	2026	Best Actress in a Teen Series	Lee Hye-ri	Pending	
Style Icon Asia	2016	Idol Actress Award	Lee Hye-ri	Won	
Style Icon Asia	2016	Style Icon	Lee Hye-ri	Nominated	
The Seoul Awards	2018	Most Popular Actress	Monstrum	Nominated	
tvN10 Awards	2016	Made in tvN, Actress in Drama	Reply 1988	Nominated	
tvN10 Awards	2016	Rising Star Award, actress	Reply 1988	Won	
tvN10 Awards	2016	Best Kiss	Lee Hye-ri (with Park Bo-gum); Reply 1988	Nominated	

=== Listicles ===
Name of publisher, year listed, name of listicle, and placement
Publisher	Year	Listicle	Placement	Ref.
Forbes	2016	Korea Power Celebrity	3rd	
Gallup Korea	2021	Best Television Couple of the Past Decade (Note: With Park Bo-gum for Reply 1988 (2015–2016))	6th	
