= Lee Seung-yeon =

South Korean actress (born 1968)

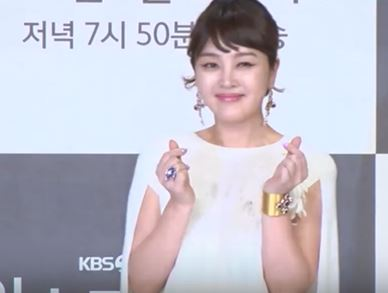
- Lee in December 2018
- Born: August 18, 1968 (age 58); Hoehyeon-dong, Jung District, Seoul, South Korea
- Education: Inha Technical College - Airline Navigation; Hanyang Cyber University - psychology
- Occupations: Actress; talk show host
- Years active: 1992–present
- Spouse: Kim Moon-chul (m. 2007)
- Children: 1

Korean name
- Hangul: 이승연
- Hanja: 李丞涓
- RR: I Seungyeon
- MR: I Sŭngyŏn

Lee Seung-yeon (Korean: 이승연; born August 18, 1968) is a South Korean actress, television host and beauty pageant titleholder.

== Career ==
Lee Seung-yeon graduated from Inha Technical College in Incheon with a degree in Airline Navigation, and became a flight attendant for Korean Air. In 1992, she joined and won third place in the Miss Korea beauty pageant. She was South Korea's representative to the 1993 Miss World pageant, where she became one of the top ten finalists.

Shortly after the pageant, Lee became a reporter for entertainment news program Scoop TV Entertainment, then launched her acting career in 1993 with the campus drama Our Paradise. She appeared in 1990s television dramas such as Love Is in Your Embrace, Hotel, Icing, Wedding Dress, and First Love, the last of which became the most highly rated Korean drama of all time with a peak viewership rating of 65.8%. She also made her big screen debut in 1996's Piano Man, followed by the films Change and Saturday, 2:00 p.m.. Lee's popularity was at its peak during these years, and in 1998 she hosted her own talk show Lee Seung-yeon's Say Say Say. With her sophisticated and cosmopolitan image, the clothes and accessories she wore became fashion trends, such as her blue-colored contact lenses in Spider, her head kerchief in Cinderella, and her black suit in Man of Autumn.

Capitalizing on her image as a trendsetter, she launched her own clothing line About el in 2007, which became a hit among consumers. This paved the way for Lee's first talk show in eight years, Style Magazine on cable channel OnStyle. Though she continues to act, Lee has become more known in recent years for hosting various style-related talk shows on cable.

== Controversy ==
=== Illegal driver's license ===
In May 1998, Lee was found to have illegally obtained a driver's license without going through the requisite tests and seminars. She was sentenced to one year's probation and 80 hours of community service. Because of public disapproval regarding the incident, her drama Heart of Lies was cut short, and she lost roles she had been previously cast in to Yoo Ho-jeong (Trap of Youth) and Lee Young-ae (Invitation).

=== Hit and run ===
In April 2002, Lee was implicated in a hit and run because she owned the vehicle driven by Kim Mo-sshi, son of celebrity Jang Young-ja. Since her costar Lee Geung-young was also being investigated at the time for having sex with a minor, both scandals caused their film Forgive Me Once Again Despite Hatred (also known as Love Me Once Again 2002 or Again) to flop at the box office.

=== Comfort women photographs ===
On February 12, 2004 Lee, and companies Lototo Inc. and Netian Entertainment held a press conference to announce their plan to sell erotic photographs and videos of Lee posing as a comfort woman over the Internet, starting in March. "Comfort women" is the Japanese term for women who were forced to serve as their armies' sex slaves during World War II. The first part of the project was shot on Palau Island in the Pacific, where real comfort women were taken, with the next phases planned in Nepal and Japan. They declared they did this to return the issue to the spotlight and that part of the profits would go to surviving comfort women. A few photographs were released, showing a semi-nude Lee bathing in the sea, sleeping on the floor, and wearing somewhat revealing white clothes, with dirt on her face.

This caused a great outcry from the surviving comfort women and the Korean Council for Women Drafted for Military Sexual Slavery by Japan. A press conference to announce the project's cancellation was held on February 16. Following the cancellation, Lee tearfully made a personal apology on her knees at the House of Sharing, a residence for some of the survivors. The women rejected her apology until the materials were destroyed, something the producer was hesitant to do. The producer further proposed a preview screening to obtain public approval for the project—they had 1 hour and a half of video and about 1,500-2,000 photos. Finally on February 19, he shaved his head (in a traditional gesture of apology) and publicly burned the materials in front of some of the surviving comfort women.

Disregarding feminist criticisms of her casting, Kim Ki-duk directed Lee in the 2004 film 3-Iron. A love story between a battered woman and a younger man who lives in empty houses, Lee and costar Jae Hee's acting were praised, and Kim won Best Director at the 61st Venice International Film Festival.

Despite the acclaim for 3-Iron, the comfort women controversy had a lasting negative effect on Lee's career, and it would take two more years before she made her acting comeback in Kim Soo-hyun's Love and Ambition in 2006.

=== Drug use ===
In 2013, she became involved in another controversy when she was indicted for illegal use of the drug propofol. Cable channel Story On cancelled her talk show Lee Seung-yeon and 100 Women as a result. Lee admitted taking propofol, but said it was legally prescribed by her doctor to treat a spinal fracture diagnosed in 2003, and that it was also administered to her as an anesthetic at skin care clinics. The Seoul Central District Court found Lee guilty of taking propofol at least 320 times over six years (or 4.5 times a month), and she was sentenced to eight months in prison, suspended for two years. Tongyang Group later sued Lee for breach of contract; she had signed a one-year ₩450 million advertising contract with the company's apparel division in 2012, which stipulated that she must not break the law or commit acts that harm the brand's image. The court ordered Lee to pay ₩100 million in 2015.

== Personal life ==
Lee married Kim Moon-chul, a Korean-American fashion entrepreneur, on December 28, 2007 at Sol Beach Resort in Yangyang County, Gangwon Province. She gave birth to a daughter in June 2009.

== Filmography ==
=== Television series ===
- The Secret House (MBC, 2022)
- Left-Handed Wife (KBS2, 2018)
- The Rich Son (MBC, 2018)
- Schoolgirl Detectives (jTBC, 2014–2015)
- The Great Seer (SBS, 2012–2013)
- Happy Ending (jTBC, 2012)
- The Scarlet Letter (MBC, 2010–2011)
- Moon Hee (2007)
- Love and Ambition (2006)
- Perfect Love (SBS, 2003)
- Who's My Love (KBS2, 2002)
- Man of Autumn (MBC, 2001)
- Oriental Theater (KBS2, 2001)
- Three Friends (MBC, 2000) (guest appearance)
- Medical Center (MBC, 2000–2001)
- Legends of Love (SBS, 2000)
- Love Story (SBS, 1999, episode 1 "Sunflower")
- Did You Ever Love? (KBS2, 1999–2000)
- Heart of Lies (MBC, 1998)
- Wedding Dress (KBS2, 1997–1998)
- Ready Go! (MBC, 1997) (guest appearance)
- Cinderella (MBC, 1997)
- First Love (KBS2, 1996–1997)
- Icing (MBC, 1996)
- Spider (MBC, 1995)
- Hotel (MBC, 1995)
- Sandglass (SBS, 1995)
- Friday's Woman - Heaven Without Angels (KBS2, 1994)
- Last Lovers (MBC, 1994)
- Love is in Your Embrace (MBC, 1994)
- Police (KBS2, 1994)
- Morning Glory (MBC, 1993)
- Our Paradise (MBC, 1993)

=== Film ===
- 3-Iron (2004)
- Again (2002)
- Saturday, 2:00 p.m. (1998)
- Change (1997)
- Piano Man (1996)

=== Variety shows ===
- Super Diva 2012 (tvN, 2012)
- Lee Seung-yeon and 100 Women (Story On, 2011–2013)
- MBC Prime - 한식의 세계화, 양념에 그 길을 묻다 (MBC, 2010) (narration)
- Lee Seung-yeon and Lee Soo-geun's Kitchen Road (TrendE, 2010)
- Talk & City 4 (Story On, 2010)
- Super Mom Diary (Story On, 2009)
- Design's Era of Success (SBS, 2008)
- Goddess of the Wind II Survival Report (tvN, 2008)
- Style Magazine (OnStyle, 2006)
- TV Entertainment Tonight (SBS, 2000)
- Lee Seung-yeon's Say Say Say (SBS, 1998)
- Summer Go Go (KBS, 1993)
- 밤으로 가는 Show (KBS, 1993)
- Youth Sketch (KBS, 1993)
- Saturday Saturday Is Fun (MBC, 1993–1995)
- Scoop TV Entertainment (MBC, 1992)
- 신 전국일주 (KBS, 1992)

=== Animated series ===
- Hotel Africa (MBC)

=== Radio program ===
- Lee Seung-yeon's Cine Town (SBS Power FM, 2007–2009)
- FM Popular Song (KBS, 1994)
- FM Dating (MBC FM Radio, 1993)

== Awards ==
- 2022 MBC Drama Awards: Top Excellence Award, Actress in a Daily/One Act Drama (The Secret House)
- 2001 KBS Drama Awards: Popularity Award (Oriental Theater)
- 2000 SBS Drama Awards: Big Star Award (Legends of Love, Medical Center)
- 1996 32nd Baeksang Arts Awards: Most Popular Actress – Television
- 1995 MBC Drama Awards: Excellence Award, Actress
- 1992 Miss Korea: Third Place
- 1990 Smile Queen Contest: Smile Queen
