= Song Duk-ho =

South Korean actress

- Born: Kim Jung-Hyun; 1 May 1993 (age 33); Seoul, South Korea
- Other name: Song Deok-ho
- Education: Dongguk University (Department of Theater)
- Occupation: Actor
- Years active: 2015–present
- Agent: Beasts Entertainment
- Known for: Moonshine; Taxi Driver; Link: Eat, Love, Kill

Song Duk-ho is a South Korean actor. He is known for his roles in dramas such as Tracer, Moonshine, Hotel del Luna , Juvenile Justice, Taxi Driver and Link: Eat, Love, Kill. He also appeared in movies Secret Zoo, Sunset in My Hometown, Burning, and What Happened to Mr. Cha?.

== Filmography ==
=== Television series ===
Year	Title	Role	Ref.
2019	The Crowned Clown	Woo Jeong-rim	
2019	Touch Your Heart	Deok-ho	
2019	Be Melodramatic	Choo Jae-hoon's friend	
2019	Doctor Prisoner	Surgical intern	
2019	Hotel del Luna	Oh Tae-seok	
2020	Hospital Playlist	KWMC resident	
2021	Taxi Driver	Cho Jong-geun	
2021	D.P.	Lee Jae-chang	
2021	The Penthouse Season 2	Ye Tae-sool	
2021	Drama Stage: Attention Hog	Kim Seong-pil	
2021	Moonshine	Jo Ji-soo	
2022	Tracer	Lee Choong-ho	
2022	Juvenile Justice	Kwak Do-seok	
2022	Link: Eat, Love, Kill	Ji Won-tak / Han Sejin	
2022	Cheer Up	Song Ho-min	
2022	May I Help You?	Seo Hae-ahn	
2022	Missing: The Other Side Season 2	Jo Jung-sik	
2023	Moving	Seo Yu-ra's boyfriend	
2023	The Worst of Evil	Yankee	

=== Film ===
Year	Title	Role
2015	The Road To School	Suho
2018	Burning	Logistics Center part-time applicant
2018	Sunset in My Hometown	Rapper
2018	Happy Together	Peter / Pedro
2019	Smoke	Jung-hyun
2019	Mae Mong	Cheol-woo
2020	Secret Zoo	Person in audience
2021	Sprinter	Lee Jung-ho
2021	Not Out	Baseball club player
2021	Seire	Intravenous Patient
2021	What Happened to Mr. Cha?	Jung-ho
2022	Re-Born	Today's Superpower
2022	Dear Young Joo	Hyun-seok
2022	Hunt	Student
2024	Wonderland	Yong-sik's son

=== Music video appearances ===
Year	Title	Artist	Length	Ref.
2021	In the Bed	Sunwoo Jung-a	3:28	

== Awards and nominations ==
Name of the award ceremony, year presented, category, nominee of the award, and the result of the nomination
Award ceremony	Year	Category	Nominee / Work	Result	Ref.
MBC Drama Awards	2022	Best New Actor	May I Help You?	Nominated	
