= What Happened to Mr. Cha? =

2021 South Korean comedy film

- Hangul: 차인표
- Hanja: 車仁杓
- RR: Chainpyo
- MR: Ch'ainp'yo
- Directed by: Dong-kyu Kim
- Written by: Dong-kyu Kim
- Starring: Cha In-pyo; Jae-Ryong Song
- Music by: Choi Seung-hyun
- Distributed by: Netflix
- Release date: January 1, 2021
- Running time: 102 minutes
- Country: South Korea
- Language: Korean

What Happened to Mr. Cha? (Korean: 차인표) is a 2021 South Korean comedy film directed and written by Dong-kyu Kim and starring Cha In-pyo and Jae-Ryong Song.

== Synopsis ==
Cha In-Pyo was once a famous actor but is now barely relevant. He refuses to accept reality even when disaster strikes.

== Cast ==
- Cha In-pyo as Cha In-Pyo
- Song Jae-ryong as A-Ram
- Jo Jan-Joon
- Cho Dal-hwan
- Song Duk-ho as Jung-ho
- Shin Shin-ae as Bok-soon
- Ryu Seung-ryong as himself
