= Moonshine (South Korean TV series) =

2021 South Korean television series

- Promotional poster
- Hangul: 꽃 피면 달 생각하고
- Lit.: When Flowers Bloom, I Think of the Moon
- RR: Kkot pimyeon dal saenggakhago
- MR: Kkot p'imyŏn tal saenggakhago
- Genre: Romance; Period drama
- Created by: Kim Sang-hwi; Hong Seok-joo; KBS Drama Division
- Written by: Kim Joo-hee
- Directed by: Hwang In-hyuk
- Starring: Yoo Seung-ho; Lee Hye-ri; Byeon Woo-seok; Kang Mi-na
- Music by: Park Se-joon (Music Manager)
- Country of origin: South Korea
- Original language: Korean
- No. of episodes: 16

Production
- Executive producer: Ki Min-soo (KBS)
- Producers: Hwang Eui-kyung; Park Chun-ho; Jeong Chan-hee
- Running time: 70 minutes
- Production companies: When Flowers Bloom, I Think of the Moon SPC; Monster Union; People Story Company

Original release
- Network: KBS2
- Release: December 20, 2021 – February 22, 2022

Moonshine (Korean: 꽃 피면 달 생각하고) is a South Korean television series starring Yoo Seung-ho, Lee Hye-ri, Byeon Woo-seok, and Kang Mi-na. It tells the story of four young people as they grow up, form friendships and fall in love during the era of strict alcohol prohibition. It aired on KBS2 from December 20, 2021 to February 22, 2022, every Monday and Tuesday at 21:30 (KST) for 16 episodes.

== Synopsis ==
It depicts human love and desire during the period of the strictest alcohol prohibition law in Joseon history.

== Cast ==
=== Main ===
- Yoo Seung-ho as Nam Young, a passionate and good-looking inspector of the Ministry of Patriots and Constitutional Affairs who left his hometown to achieve fame in Hanyang and restore his family's honor.
  - Jung Hyeon-jun as young Nam Young
- Lee Hye-ri as Kang Ro-seo, a poor aristocrat's daughter who is the family's breadwinner. She is hard-working and does all types of jobs to make money. She secretly begins brewing liquor to pay off her debts.
- Byeon Woo-seok as Lee Pyo, the rebellious crown prince who often sneaks out of the palace to have a drink even in a time of prohibition, causing nuisance for the kingdom.
- Kang Mi-na as Han Ae-jin, the only daughter of a noble family who is straightforward and stubborn. She is transparent about her dislikes and absolutely must do what she wants.
- Choi Won-young as Lee Si-heum, Lee Pyo's uncle who is an ambitious and mysterious person.
- Jang Gwang as Yeon Jo-mun, a powerful man who directly placed the King on the throne.

=== Supporting ===
==== People around Nam Young ====
- Kim Ki-bang as Chun-gae
- Im Won-hee as Hwang-ga
- Lee Si-hoon as Kim Seok-won
- Im Cheol-hyung as Nam Tae-ho

==== People around Kang Ro-seo ====
- Seo Ye-hwa as Seo Hye-min / Cheon Geum
- Bae Yoo-ram as Kang Hae-soo

==== People around Lee Pyo ====
- Jung Sung-il as King Lee Kang
- Ahn Si-ha as Lee Kyung-bin
- Kim Min-ho as Kim Eol-dong

==== People in the night street ====
- Moon Yoo-kang as Shim Heon
- Park Ah-in as Woon Shim
- Hong Wan-pyo as Gye Sang-mok
- Lee Ha-nee as Jung-mok
- Shin Hee-chul as Ha-mok
- Lee Ki-taek as Tae-seon
- Kim Ji-an as Ok-ran

==== People in the palace ====
- Byun Seo-yoon as Yeon Jung-jeon
- Lee Hwang-ui as Han Sang-woon
- Han Soo-hyun as Yeon Chae-bong
- Kim Jae-rok as Yeon Gi-bong
- Shin Hyun-jong as Jo Hee-bo
- Song Duk-ho as Jo Ji-soo

=== Extended ===
- Jung Young-joo
- Park Seong-hyun as Kang San / Mak San
- Lee Chae-kyung as Jo Haeng-soo

=== Special appearances ===
- Park Eun-seok as Seong-hyeon, Lee Pyo's half-brother.
- Hwang Bo-ra as a woman who captures the attention of Hwang-ga.

== Production ==
Filming was scheduled to begin in May 2021.

== Original soundtrack ==
=== Part 1 ===
Released on December 20, 2021
No.	Title	Lyrics	Music	Artist	Length
1.	"Even Though" (괜찮다가도)	Kim Chang-rak; Atone (Aiming); Choi Song-hee (Onclassa); Choi Bo-kyung (Onclassa)	Kim Chang-rak; Kim Soo-bin (Aiming); Kwon Soo-hyun; Atone (Aiming)	Monday Kiz	3:57
2.	"Even Though" (괜찮다가도; Inst.)		Kim Chang-rak; Kim Soo-bin (Aiming); Kwon Soo-hyun; Atone (Aiming)		3:57
Total length:					7:54

=== Part 2 ===
Released on December 27, 2021
No.	Title	Lyrics	Music	Artist	Length
1.	"Love Me Again" (거짓말이라 말해)	Han Gil	Han Gil	Sojung	3:21
2.	"Love Me Again" (거짓말이라 말해; Inst.)		Han Gil		3:21
Total length:					6:42

=== Part 3 ===
Released on January 3, 2022
No.	Title	Lyrics	Music	Artist	Length
1.	"Who You Are" (너라는 꿈)	Kim Beom-joo; Kim Si-hyeok	Kim Beom-joo; Kim Si-hyeok	Ha Sung-woon	3:30
2.	"Who You Are" (너라는 꿈; Inst.)		Kim Beom-joo; Kim Si-hyeok		3:30
Total length:					7:00

=== Part 4 ===
Released on January 10, 2022
No.	Title	Lyrics	Music	Artist	Length
1.	"Fly High" (날아올라)	Kim Soo-bin (Aiming); Blue Mangtto; Yoon Kyung-won; Lee Joo-heon	Kim Chang-rak; Jo Se-hee; Blue Mangtto; Atone (Aiming)	Lucy	3:53
2.	"Fly High" (날아올라; Inst.)		Kim Chang-rak; Jo Se-hee; Blue Mangtto; Atone (Aiming)		3:53
Total length:					7:46

=== Part 5 ===
Released on January 11, 2022
No.	Title	Lyrics	Music	Artist	Length
1.	"Missing You" (너를 바라만 보는 게)	Dr. Son; Yountoven	Dr. Son; Yountoven	Minseo	3:25
2.	"Missing You" (너를 바라만 보는 게; Inst.)		Dr. Son; Yountoven		3:25
Total length:					6:50

=== Part 6 ===
Released on January 17, 2022
No.	Title	Lyrics	Music	Artist	Length
1.	"Moonshine" (꽃 피면 달 생각하고)	Taibian	Taibian; Kim Jung-woo (Toxic); Director Ahn	Jamie	4:04
2.	"Moonshine" (꽃 피면 달 생각하고; Inst.)		Taibian; Kim Jung-woo (Toxic); Director Ahn		4:04
Total length:					8:08

=== Part 7 ===
Released on January 24, 2022
No.	Title	Lyrics	Music	Artist	Length
1.	"Once in a Minute" (1분에 한 번)	Taibian	Taibian; Kim Jung-woo (Toxic); Director Ahn	Seo Eun-kwang	3:37
2.	"Once in a Minute" (1분에 한 번; Inst.)		Taibian; Kim Jung-woo (Toxic); Director Ahn		3:37
Total length:					7:14

=== Part 8 ===
Released on February 8, 2022
No.	Title	Lyrics	Music	Artist	Length
1.	"Someday"	Kim Beom-joo; Kim Si-hyeok	Kim Beom-joo; Kim Si-hyeok	Miyeon	3:54
2.	"Someday" (Inst.)		Kim Beom-joo; Kim Si-hyeok		3:54
Total length:					7:48

=== Part 9 ===
Released on February 21, 2022
No.	Title	Lyrics	Music	Artist	Length
1.	"Love Your Everything"	Kim Beom-joo; Kim Si-hyeok	Kim Beom-joo; Kim Si-hyeok	Golden Child (Note: Sung by Joochan, Jibeom)	3:07
2.	"Love Your Everything" (Inst.)		Kim Beom-joo; Kim Si-hyeok		3:07
Total length:					6:14

== Viewership ==
Moonshine : South Korea viewers per episode (thousands)

Season	Episode number																Average
Season	1	2	3	4	5	6	7	8	9	10	11	12	13	14	15	16	Average
1	1262	1263	1115	1228	938	1064	911	965	934	984	923	1043	695	788	922	1018	1003

Source: Audience measurement performed nationwide by Nielsen Korea.

Average TV viewership ratings
Ep.	Original broadcast date	Average audience share (Nielsen Korea)	
Ep.	Original broadcast date	Nationwide	Seoul
1	December 20, 2021	7.5% (10th)	6.9% (10th)
2	December 21, 2021	7.2% (9th)	6.7% (10th)
3	December 27, 2021	6.3% (14th)	5.8% (15th)
4	December 28, 2021	7.6% (9th)	7.1% (9th)
5	January 3, 2022	5.4% (16th)	4.9% (15th)
6	January 4, 2022	6.2% (11th)	5.6% (13th)
7	January 10, 2022	5.4% (14th)	5.1% (14th)
8	January 11, 2022	5.4% (17th)	5.2% (16th)
9	January 17, 2022	4.9% (19th)	4.6% (19th)
10	January 18, 2022	5.6% (16th)	5.3% (16th)
11	January 24, 2022	5.1% (15th)	5.0% (16th)
12	January 25, 2022	5.9% (13th)	5.4% (15th)
13	February 8, 2022 (Note: Episodes 13 and 14 aired on February 8, 2022 due to Lunar New Year (January 31 – February 1) and the broadcast of 2022 Winter Olympics (February 7).)	4.2% (20th)	3.8% (20th)
14	February 8, 2022	4.9% (15th)	4.7% (15th)
15	February 21, 2022	5.3% (12th)	4.6% (14th)
16	February 22, 2022	5.9% (11th)	5.3% (14th)
Average		5.8%	5.4%
In the table above, the blue numbers represent the lowest ratings and the red numbers represent the highest ratings.
