= Park Ho-san =

South Korean actor

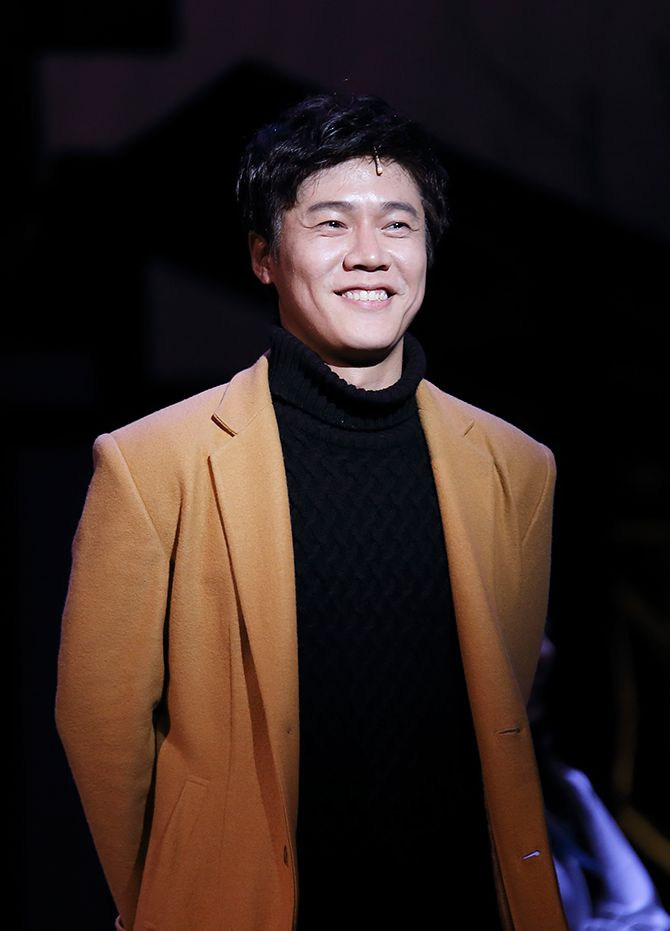
- Park in 2015
- Born: Park Jeong-hwan; October 18, 1972 (age 54); South Korea
- Education: Chung-Ang University
- Occupation: Actor
- Years active: 1993–present
- Agent: Light House Entertainment
- Spouse: Kim Dong-hwa (m. 2012)
- Children: 3

Korean name
- Hangul: 박정환
- RR: Bak Jeonghwan
- MR: Pak Chŏnghwan

Stage name
- Hangul: 박호산
- RR: Bak Hosan
- MR: Pak Hosan

Park Ho-san (Korean: 박호산; born Park Jung-hwan on October 18, 1972) is a South Korean actor. He is best known for his performance in the stage play Suck (2008), In the Heights (2015), Chuncheon There (2009, 2015), Waiting for Heroes (2013), Frozen (2015), and The Book of a Thief (2015). Park has also known for his appearances as a supporting actor in the television series Prison Playbook (2017–2018), My Mister (2018), Lawless Lawyer (2018), and The Penthouse: War in Life (2020–2021).

== Early life and education ==
Park was born on October 18, 1972, to a father who owned a business called Jimulpo, which provided flooring services. Park's passion for acting was ignited when he saw a play called Hamlet 4, directed by Ki Guk-seo, during his middle school years. A ticket to the play was given to him as a gift by a satisfied customer of his father's flooring business, Jimulpo. Despite attending the play alone due to his friends' lack of interest in the title, Park Jeong-hwan was captivated by the actors' performances under the vibrant stage lights. The experience was distinct from watching performances on television and left a lasting impression on him, solidifying his desire to pursue a career in acting.

Park's interest in acting was sparked when he saw the play "Hamlet." While attending Baejae High School in Seoul, he decided to pursue a major in acting and formed a theater club with friends. With his two friends, Park visited the theater and office of Seoul Yejeon (now Seoul University of the Arts) with two friends to find a drama class instructor.

Park enrolled at the Department of Theater and Film Park at Chung-Ang University.

== Career ==
In 1993, he became member of the Yeonwoo Theater Company, (Note: Yeonwoo Stage (연우무대를), which means 'playing friend', started as a small group on February 5, 1977, and is Korea's representative theater company that has led the revitalization of creative plays in the Korean theater world. From the days of Sinchon to the present in Hyehwa-dong, Yeonwoo Stage has been working hard to realize the complete stage of novel creative works.) and made his debut in the play Winter Wanderer in 1996. In 1997, Park started cinema acting with a small role in film Black Jack. In 1998, he continued to act in minor roles in four films, Story of Man, Saturday, 2:00 pm!, Soul Guardians, and A Mystery of the Cube. In 2001, Park appeared in feature film Wanee & Junah.

Although he had a fondness for singing and an interest in musicals, he believed that plays and musicals were distinct. He particularly enjoyed watching plays in a place called Daehakro. However, in 2005, everything changed when he saw the play Agamemnon. This contemporary adaptation of a classic featured the main character singing like a rock singer instead of delivering a traditional speech, under the direction of Michael Marmarinos. The powerful singing in Agamemnon left a profound impact on Park. This experience opened doors for him to participate in musicals such as Assassin and Mr. Mouse. Through firsthand exposure to musicals, Park's perspective shifted, realizing that they held the same level of artistic value as plays.

When he reached the age of forty (korean age), Park believed his life had taken a wrong turn. While worrying about his future, his grandfather appeared in a dream and called him 'Ho-sani'. He became curious as to why he was being called Ho-san. A few months later, when he was considering changing his name, he remembered the name his grandfather called him in the dream came to mind. As a result, he changed his name to "Hoe Mosa" based on the name his grandfather called him.

Park and Lee Dong-soo were double cast as the 'Actor' in the horror thriller two-hander play Woman in Black, opposite Hong Seong-deok who played the role of 'Arthur Kipps'. The original work was adapted by Stephen Malatret from Susan Hill's best-selling novel and entered England's West End in 1989. It received a steady stream of audiences and had been performed non-stop for 22 years until the present date. The play was reopened on July 9th at Chungmu Art Hall's Middle Theater Black.

In 2011, Park starred as Erik Satie, a renowned French composer and pianist, in the musical Erik Satie from August 26 to 27 at the Ansan Arts Center's Dalmaji Theater. The musical combined Erik Satie's music and the contents of his dramatic life. It was an original work planned by the Ansan Arts Center and contained the will to expand the scope of new forms of production. Lee Joo-kwang played the film director Tommy and Han Seong-sik played multiple roles.

In the 13th performance of the musical Audition, Park and Heo Gyu rejoined the cast as Choi Jun-cheol and Park Byeong-tae, respectively. Furthermore, actors Song Yong-jin and Jang Deok-soo joined the cast as Park Byeong-tae, and Oh Eui-sik joined the cast as Choi Jun-cheol. The musical was performed at Daehakro Cultural Space Feeling 1 from June 7th to December 31st, 2011.

In 2013, Park reprised his role as Erik Satie and acted alongside Bae Hae-sun. Directed by Park Hye-sun, the production ran from November 22 to December 1, 2013, at the Grand Theater of Daehakro Arts Theater in Dongsung-dong, Seoul.

In 2014, Park starred in feature film The King of Jokgu, followed by The Great Army (2017), The Deokmo: The Age of Rebellion (2017), and The Selfish Man (2017), and acted in plays and musicals.

Park started with tvN's drama Liar Game (2014). In 2015, he played painter Lee Jung-seop in musical Myeongdong Romance. Also acted in several plays, included In the Heights (2015), Chuncheon There (2015), Frozen (2015), and The Book of a Thief (2015).

Park also appeared in 2016 SBS drama Wanted (2016) and followed by Innocent Defendant (2017). In 2017, Park impressed audiences with his supporting role in the drama series Prison Playbook, as Kang Chul-doo (aka "KAIST" of Mullae-dong. He has a severe lisp, which other inmates (especially Han-yang) make fun of. He is an engineer who was sentenced to 3 years and 6 months' imprisonment because of a gambling scam. Directed by Shin Won-ho, Prison Playbook became a successful hit. Since then, Park gained momentum as an actor.

In 2018, Park was cast in drama My Mister as replacement of Oh Dal-su. He appeared as Park Sang-hoon, who was the male protagonist's eldest brother. He is a middle-aged man who was fired from his job and then ran two failing businesses, which ended up in him being chased out of his own home. Though he has to live under his mother's roof, he's a romanticist at heart who always thinks about ways to find happiness. His performance received favorable reviews from the audience.

Park is a member of Man Theater, a theater company.

== Personal life ==
Park is married to theater actress Kim Dong-hwa, who is eight years younger than him. They have three sons, including rapper Park Joon-ho.

== Filmography ==
=== Film ===
Film appearances of Park Ho-san
Year	Title	Role	Ref.
1997	Blackjack	Student majoring in physical education	
1998	Story of Man	Waiter	
1998	Saturday, 2:00 pm	Department store customer	
1998	Soul Guardians	Detective A	
1998	A Mystery of the Cube	Copycat	
1999	Phantom: The Submarine	Number 434	
2001	Wanee & Junah	Sung-jae	
2001	Indian Summer	Lawyer Kim	
2004	Doma Ahn Jung-geun	Jo Do-sun	
2014	The King of Jokgu	Hyung-kook	
2015	The Sound of a Flower	Manager of Jin Yeon-chung	
2016	No Tomorrow	Debate Lawyer	
2016	The Great Actor	Seung-ji	
2016	Derailed	Detective Jang	
2017	Warriors of the Dawn	King Seonjo	
2019	Beautiful Voice	CEO Park	
2020	The Call	Kim Seo-yeon's father	
2020	Night in Paradise	Yang Do-soo	
2022	Project Wolf Hunting	Lee Seok-woo	
2023	Unlocked	Lee Seung-woo	
2023	Always I am	Yong-gi	
2023	The Bright Girl	Joruz	
2024	Dead Man	Jo Pil-joo	
TBA	Omniscient Reader's Viewpoint	Gong Pil-du	

=== Television series ===
Television series appearances
Year	Title	Role	Notes	Ref.
2014	Liar Game			
2015	Mrs. Cop			
2016	Wanted	Ham Tae-sub		
2017	Innocent Defendant	Choi Dae-hong		
2017–2018	Prison Playbook	Kaist		
2018	Mother			
2018	My Mister	Park Sang-hun		
2018	Lawless Lawyer	Chun Seung-bum		
2018	The Guest	Detective Ko		
2018	Exit			
2018–2019	Less Than Evil	Jeon Choon-man		
2018	The Ghost Detective	Lee Kyung-woo		
2019	Flower Crew: Joseon Marriage Agency	Ma Dong-deok		
2019	Pegasus Market	Kwon Young-goo		
2019	Catch the Ghost	Choi Do-cheol		
2020	Dinner Mate	Keanu		
2020–2021	True Beauty	Im Jae-pil		
2020–2021	Hush	Uhm Sung-han		
2021	The Penthouse: War in Life	Yoo Dong-pil	Season 2 (cameo; episode 13); Season 3 (supporting cast)	
2021	Racket Boys	Park Jeong-yong	Cameo (Episode 1)	
2022	Tracer	Hwang Cheol-min	Cameo	
2022	Hunted	Young-soo		
2022	Today's Webtoon	Jang Man-cheol		
2022	Behind Every Star	himself	Cameo (episode 5)	
2023	Taxi Driver 2	Bishop	Cameo (episode 14–16)	
2023	Twinkling Watermelon	Choi Hyeon		
2023–2024	Maestra: Strings of Truth	Jeon Sang-do		
2023–2024	My Happy Ending	Nam Tae-joo		
2025	Karma	Hwang Cheol-mok		
2026	The Remarried Empress	Viscount Lotteshu		

=== Web series ===
Web series appearances
Year	Title	Role	Ref.
2020	Extracurricular	Jung Jin	
2021	Would You Like a Cup of Coffee?	Park Seok	
2022	Monstrous	Kwon Jong-soo	

== Stage ==
=== Concert ===
Concert performances of Park Ho-san
Year	Title		Role	Venue	Date	Ref.
Year	English	Korean	Role	Venue	Date	Ref.
2010	Intermission Concert	인터미션 콘서트	Singer	Dongduk Women's University Performing Arts Center	June 11, 2010 - June 13, 2010	
2011	ASAC Christmas Concert - Ansan	ASAC 크리스마스 콘서트 - 안산	Singer	Ansan Culture & Arts Center Sunrise Theater	December 24, 2011 - December 24, 2011	
2015	Musical Talk Concert Who Am I 23	뮤지컬토크콘서트 Who Am I 23	Performer	Olympus Hall	July 30, 2015	
2017	Thanks Concert	Thanks 콘서트	Singer	-	February 1, 2017	
2017	The Pro Actors Concert	더프로액터스 콘서트	Performer	Gwanguk Art Center BBCH Hall	April 1, 2017	
2018	Wonju Winter Dancing Carnival	원주 윈터 댄싱카니발	Performer	Wonju Chiak Sports Complex	February 10, 2018 - February 18, 2018	
2018	Kim Kwang-seok Revival - Wonju	김광석 다시부르기 - 원주	Singer	Wonju Chiak Sports Complex	March 24, 2018	
2018	Kim Kwang-seok Revival - Jinju	김광석 다시부르기 - 진주	Singer	Gyeongsangnam-do Culture and Arts Center	June 23, 2018	
2021	Band-aid Concert	반창고 콘서트	Singer	Gyeonggi Art Center	September 7, 2021	

=== Musical ===
Musical play performances of Park Ho-san
Year	Title		Role	Venue	Date	Ref.
Year	English	Korean	Role	Venue	Date	Ref.
2005	Assassins	암살자들	Jangara, Winter Wanderer, Grasshopper, etc.	Seoul Arts Centre CJ Towol Theatre	July 9th to July 30th, 2005	
2006—2007	Mr. Mouse	미스터 마우스	인후	Daehak-ro Live Theatre	May 18th, 2006, to January 1st, 2007	
2006—2007	Zoological Gardens	동물원	Man-seung	Baekam Art Hall	December 1st, 2006, and January 7th, 2007	
2008	Laundry	빨래	Solongo	Jiin Theater (Formerly Algaehaek Theater)	August 29th to December 31st, 2008	
2009	Waiting for a Hero	영웅을 기다리며	Yi Sun-sin	Happy Theater, Seoul	January 23, 2009 - June 28, 2009	
2009	Waiting for a Hero	영웅을 기다리며	Yi Sun-sin	Culture and Arts Theater CT, Daegu	April 17, 2009 - June 14, 2009	
2009	Weight for You	웨잇포유	-	JTN Art Hall 3rd Theater	June 2, 2009 - August 30, 2009	
2009	The Count	명수 역	Lee (Er)	Arko City Theater	June 9, 2009 to July 8, 2009	
2009	Gunmetal Blues	건메탈 블루스	Sam Galahad	Mudi's Hall	October 15, 2009 - January 10, 2010	
2010	Waiting for a Hero	영웅을 기다리며	Yi Sun-sin	Happy Theater	January 8, 2010 - March 28, 2010	
2010	Organic Musical "Bachelor's Vegetable Store 2.0"	유기농 뮤지컬 총각네 야채가게 2.0	CEO	CJ Azit Daehangno (formerly SM Art Hall)	January 15, 2010 - June 30, 2010	
2011	Gwanghwamun Love Song	광화문 연가	Haeng-joon	Sejong Centre for the Performing Arts Grand Theatre	March 20, 2011 - April 10, 2011	
2011	Gwanghwamun Love Song	광화문 연가	Haeng-joon	Gwangju Culture & Arts Center Main Theater	April 22, 2011 - April 24, 2011	
2011	Gwanghwamun Love Song	광화문 연가	Haeng-joon	Daegu Keimyung Arts Center	April 29, 2011 - May 1, 2011	
2011	Gwanghwamun Love Song	광화문 연가	Haeng-joon	Goyang Aram Nuri Aram Theater	May 20, 2011 - May 22, 2011	
2011	Gwanghwamun Love Song	광화문 연가	Haeng-joon	Busan Cultural Center Main Theater	June 4, 2011 - June 5, 2011	
2011	Gwanghwamun Love Song	광화문 연가	Haeng-joon	Daejeon Arts Center Art Hall	June 10, 2011 - June 12, 2011	
2011	Gwanghwamun Love Song	광화문 연가	Haeng-joon	Ansan Culture & Arts Center Sunrise Theater	June 24, 2011 - June 26, 2011	
2011	The Woman in Black	우먼인블랙	Actor	Chungmu Art Center Main Theater Black	July 9, 2011 - September 10, 2011	
2011	Erik Satie	에릭사티	Erik Satie	Ansan Culture & Arts Center Moonrise Theater	August 26, 2011 - August 27, 2011	
2011	Erik Satie	에릭사티	Erik Satie	Daehak-ro Theater Om 1	September 30, 2011 - October 2, 2011	
2011	Audition	오디션	Choi Jun-cheol	Daehak-ro Theater Om 1	October 7, 2011 - December 31, 2011	
2012	Gwanghwamun Serenade	광화문 연가	Hyun-jae	LG Arts Center	February 7, 2012 - March 11, 2012	
2012	Gwanghwamun Serenade	광화문 연가	Hyun-jae	Daejeon Arts Center Art Hall	April 26, 2012 - April 29, 2012	
2012	Gwanghwamun Serenade	광화문 연가	Hyun-jae	Ulsan Culture and Arts Center Grand Theater	May 4, 2012 - May 6, 2012	
2012	The Graves of the Stars	별들의 무덤	Young Man/Writer	Small Theater Gwangya (formerly Daehak-ro Art Theater 3rd Hall)	May 11, 2012 - May 20, 2012	
2012	Gwanghwamun Serenade	광화문 연가	Hyun-jae	Chungmu Art Hall	May 13, 2012 - June 3, 2012	
2012	Gwanghwamun Serenade	광화문 연가	Hyun-jae	Jeju Art Center	June 30, 2012 - July 1, 2012	
2012	2012 Daegu International Musical Festival - Gwanghwamun Serenade	2012 대구국제뮤지컬페스티벌 - 광화문연가	Hyun-jae	Daegu Keimyung Art Center	June 22, 2012 - June 24, 2012	
2012	Gwanghwamun Serenade - Busan Centum City Musical Theater Opening Celebration	광화문연가 - 부산 센텀시티 뮤지컬전용관 개관기념	Hyun-jae	Centum City Sohyang C's Theater Shinhan Card Hall	July 20, 2012 - August 5, 2012	
2012	Gwanghwamun Serenade	광화문연가 - 인천	Hyun-jae	Incheon Culture and Arts Center Grand Theater	August 24, 2012 - August 26, 2012	
2012	Gwanghwamun Serenade	광화문연가 - 인천	Hyun-jae	Korean Sound Culture Hall Moak Hall, Jeonju	September 1, 2012 - September 2, 2012	
2012	Gwanghwamun Serenade	광화문연가 - 인천	Hyun-jae	Gwangju Cultural Center Main Theater	October 6, 2012 - October 7, 2012	
2012	2000th Commemorative Performance of Laundry [The Memory]	빨래2000회 기념공연 [The Memory]	Solongo	Hakjeon Green Theater	October 12, 2012 - November 11, 2012	
2012	Gwanghwamun Serenade	광화문 연가	Hyun-jae	Osaka Shingakubashi-za	November 6, 2012 - December 2, 2012	
2012	Gwanghwamun Serenade	광화문 연가	Hyun-jae	Tokyo Meiji-za	November 6, 2012 - December 2, 2012	
2012–2013	My Love by My Side	내사랑 내곁에	Seung Yoon	Hanjeon Art Center	December 11, 2012 - January 20, 2013	
2013	The Man Who Became King	광해 왕이 된 남자		Dongsoong Art Center, Dongsoong Hall	February 23, 2013 - April 21, 2013	
2013	Waiting for a Hero	영웅을 기다리며	Lee Soon-shin	Happy Theater	April 27, 2013 - September 1, 2013	
2013	Erik Satie	에릭사티	Erik Satie	Daehakro Arts Theater Grand Theater	November 22, 2013 - December 1, 2013	
2013	December	디셈버	Hoon	Sejong Center for the Performing Arts, Grand Theater	December 16, 2013 - January 29, 2014	
2014	December	디셈버	Hoon	Centum City S.Oil Theater Shinhan Card Hall	February 7, 2014 - February 16, 2014	
2014	Love Letter	러브레터	Akiba	Dongsoong Art Center, Dongsoong Hall	December 2, 2014 - February 15, 2015	
2015	In the Heights	인 더 하이츠	Kevin	Blue Square Samsung Card Hall	September 4, 2015 - November 22, 2015	
2015	Myeongdong Romance	명동로망스	Lee Jung-seop	Chungmu Art Center Small Theater Blue	October 20, 2015 - January 10, 2016	
2015	Myeongdong Romance	명동로망스	Lee Jung-seop	Daehak-ro Arts Theatre Grand Theatre	August 27 to August 28, 2016	
2015	Erik Satie	에릭사티	Erik Satie	Dongsoong Art Center Dongsoong Hall	November 6, 2015 - November 8, 2015	
2015	Erik Satie	에릭사티 - 안산	Erik Satie	Ansan Culture & Arts Center Dalmae Theater	November 27, 2015 - November 29, 2015	
2015—2016	That Summer, The Zoo	그 여름, 동물원	Kim Kwang-seok	Dongsoong Art Center Dongsoong Hall	December 18, 2015 - January 10, 2016	
2016	In the Heights	인 더 하이츠	Kevin	Daejeon Arts Center Hall	January 6, 2016 - January 7, 2016	
2016	Myeongdong Romance	명동 로망스	Lee Joong-seop	Dongsoong Art Center Dongsoong Hall	March 22 to April 24, 2016	
2016	The Summer, the Zoo - Ansan	그 여름, 동물원 - 안산	Kim Gwang-seok	Ansan Culture and Arts Center Dalmae Theater	June 24 to June 26, 2016	
2016	Myeongdong Romance	명동 로망스	Lee Joong-seop	Daehak-ro Arts Theater Main Hall	August 27 to August 28, 2016	
2016	Myeongdong Romance	명동 로망스	Lee Joong-seop	Mokpo Culture and Arts Center Main Hall	November 5 to November 6, 2016	
2016	Geumgang, 1894	금강, 1894	Jeon Bong-jun	Seongnam Arts Center Opera House	December 1 to December 4, 2016	
2019–2020	Big Fish	빅 피쉬	Edward Bloom	Seoul Arts Centre CJ Towol Theatre	December 4, 2019 to February 9, 2020	

=== Theater ===
Theater play performances of Park Ho-san
Year	Title		Role	Venue	Date	Ref.
Year	English	Korean	Role	Venue	Date	Ref.
2006	Lee	이(爾)	Gong-gil	National Central Museum Theater Yong	January 7, 2006 to February 2, 2006	
2006	Lee	이(爾)	Gong-gil	LG Art Center	June 28, 2006 to July 14, 2006	
2006	Zoo	동물원	Man-seung	Baekam Art Hall	December 1, 2006 to January 7, 2007	
2007	Cheolsu and Mansu	철수와 만수	Cheol-su	Yeonwoo Theater (Daehak-ro)	March 30, 2007 to July 29, 2007	
2007	Crazy Kiss	미친키스	Jang Jung	Daehak-ro Seolchi Theater Jeongmiso	December 8, 2007 to March 2, 2008	
2008	Brave Brothers	형제는 용감했다	Seok Bong	Daehak-ro Jayu Theater	March 22, 2008 to June 22, 2008	
2008	Sufficient Mourning: A Tribute	충분히 애도되지 못한 슬픔 : 창작예찬	Se-su	Arko Arts Theater Studio	August 1, 2008 to August 10, 2008	
2008	Brave Brothers	형제는 용감했다	Seok Bong	Doosan Art Center Yeongang Hall	December 5, 2008 to February 8, 2009	
2009	Lee	이(爾)	Yeon-san	Arko Arts Theater	June 9, 2009 - July 8, 2009	
2009	Trace	추적	Milo	Seoul Arts Center Jayu Theater	May 7, 2010 - June 20, 2010	
2009	Chuncheon Gogi	춘천거기	Myeong-su	Myeongbo Art Hall HARAM Hall	September 11, 2009 - November 22, 2009	
2010	Dinner	디너	Gabe	Sanullim Theater	September 1, 2010 - September 19, 2010	
2010	2010 Seoul Theater Olympics - Roberto Zucco	2010 서울연극올림픽 - 로베르토 쥬코	Roberto Zucco	Daehakro Arts Theatre Small Theatre	October 18 to 19, 2010	
2011	Rental Apartment	임대아파트	Yoon Jeong-ho	Sky Theater	June 24, 2011 - December 31, 2011	
2011	Seagull	갈매기	Tori Gorin	Sogang University Mary Hall	November 25, 2011 - December 11, 2011	
2012	Hamlet - Daejeon	해마 - 대전	Jang-ne	Daejeon Small Theater Madang	March 23, 2012 - April 22, 2012	
2012	Hamlet	해마	Jang-ne	Moshinun Sarangdeul Theater	March 31, 2012 - June 3, 2012	
2012	Cherry Blossom Hill	벚꽃동산	Lopahin	Sejong Cultural Center M Theater	October 12, 2012 - October 28, 2012	
2013	Pumba - The Voice of the Highest Deity of the Lowest	품바 - 가장 낮은 자의 가장 높은 신명의 소리	Periant	Daehakro Sangsang Art Hall Blue	July 1, 2013 - September 30, 2013	
2013	14-person Chekhov	14인 체홉		Project Box Siya	June 18, 2013 - July 7, 2013	
2014	Deathtrap	데스트랩	Sydney Bruhl	Yes24 Stage 2, Yes24 Stage	July 9, 2014 - September 21, 2014	
2014	Julius Caesar	줄리어스 시저	Anthony	Myeongdong Theater	May 21, 2014 - June 15, 2014	
2014	The Delightful Maid Marisa	유쾌한 하녀 마리사	Yanker Policeman	Doosan Art Center Space111	March 6, 2014 - March 23, 2014	
2014	Almost Maine	올모스트 메인	Chad	JTN Art Hall 4	January 23, 2014 - February 23, 2014	
2015	Miraclegordia	미제리꼬르디아	-	Dosan Art Center Space111	January 29, 2015 - January 31, 2015	
2015	Stolen Book	도둑맞은 책	Seo Dong-yoon	Dongyang Arts Theater 3 (formerly Art Center K Dong Circle Theater)	February 27, 2015 - April 26, 2015	
2015	Frozen	프로즌	Ralph	Arko Arts Theater Studio	June 9, 2015 - July 5, 2015	
2015	Chuncheon There	춘천 거기	Myeong-soo	Uni-Plex Theater 3	July 2, 2015 - October 4, 2015	
2015	Frozen	프로즌	Ralph	Art One Theater 3	July 10, 2015 - July 26, 2015	
2015	Pervert	변태	Min Hyo-seok	Yeonwoo Theater (Daehak-ro)	October 1, 2015 - December 31, 2015	
2016	Spring Literary Contest - Byeon-gi	2016 신춘문예 클래식전 - 변기	Bishop	Arko Arts Theater Small Theater	March 26 to April 3, 2016	
2016	Ice	얼음	Detective 1 (Cho Doo-man)	Yes24 Stage 3	February 13 to March 20, 2016	
2016	The Devil Inside	데블 인사이드	Karl	Art One Theater 2	July 9 to July 31, 2016	
2016	The Stolen Book	도둑맞은 책	Seo Dong-yoon	Chungmu Art Center Small Theater Blue	September 1 to September 25, 2016	
2016–2017	The Stolen Book	도둑맞은 책	Seo Dong-yoon	Daehak-ro Arts Theatre Tree and Water	December 16, 2016 to February 26, 2017	
2017	Exit Number One Theater Festival	일번출구 연극제		JH Art Hall (formerly Asijo Theater)	March 1, 2017 - May 7, 2017	
2017	Frozen	프로즌	Ralph	Yegrin C-Theater	June 6, 2017 - July 16, 2017	
2019	A Doll's House, Part 2	인형의 집, Part 2	Torwald	LG Art Centre	April 10, 2019 to April 28, 2019	
2021	Ice	얼음	Detective 1 (Cho Doo-man)	Sejong Centre for the Performing Arts S Theatre	January 8, 2021 to March 21, 2021	
2022	Era of No Title	무제의 시대	Bi Hyeong-nyang	Theatre Kum	January 21, 2022 to January 30, 2022	
2023	Othello	오셀로	Othello	Seoul Arts Centre CJ Towol Theatre	May 12, 2023 to June 4, 2023	
2023	Defective Play	기형도 플레이		Art One Theatre 3	October 19, 2023 to October 29, 2023	
2024	Art	아트	Ivan	Link Art Centre Bugs Hall	February 13, 2024 to May 12, 2024	

== Awards and nominations ==
Awards and nominations received by Park Ho-san
Award ceremony	Year	Category	Nominee / Work	Result	Ref.
APAN Star Awards	2019	Best Supporting Actor	Prison Playbook	Won	
Baeksang Arts Awards	2018	Best Supporting Actor – Television	Prison Playbook	Won	
Korea Culture and Entertainment Awards	2022	Best Actor	Hunted	Won	
Korea Drama Awards	2022	Best Supporting Actor	Today's Webtoon	Won	
MBC Drama Awards	2022	Top Excellence Award, Actor in a Daily/One-Act Drama	Hunted	Won	
SBS Drama Awards	2022	Best Supporting Actor in a Miniseries Romance/Comedy	Today's Webtoon	Nominated	
