= 2022 MBC Drama Awards =

41st edition of award ceremony

- Official logo
- Date: December 30, 2022
- Site: MBC Media Center Public Hall, Sangam-dong, Mapo-gu, Seoul
- Hosted by: Kim Sung-joo; Choi Soo-young
- Official website: MBC Drama Awards

Highlights
- Best Drama Serial: Big Mouth
- Grand Prize (Daesang): Lee Jong-suk

Television coverage
- Network: MBC; Naver Now
- Ratings: Ratings: 5.2%; Viewership: 996,000

The 2022 MBC Drama Awards, presented by Munhwa Broadcasting Corporation (MBC) took place at MBC Media Center Public Hall in Sangam-dong, Mapo-gu, Seoul on December 30, 2022. It was aired from 20:50 (KST) on iMBC official website and Naver Now.

Kim Sung-joo hosted the award ceremony third year in succession with Choi Soo-young. The Grand Prize (Daesang) was won by Lee Jong-suk and award for Best drama of the year went to Big Mouth.

== Winners and nominees ==
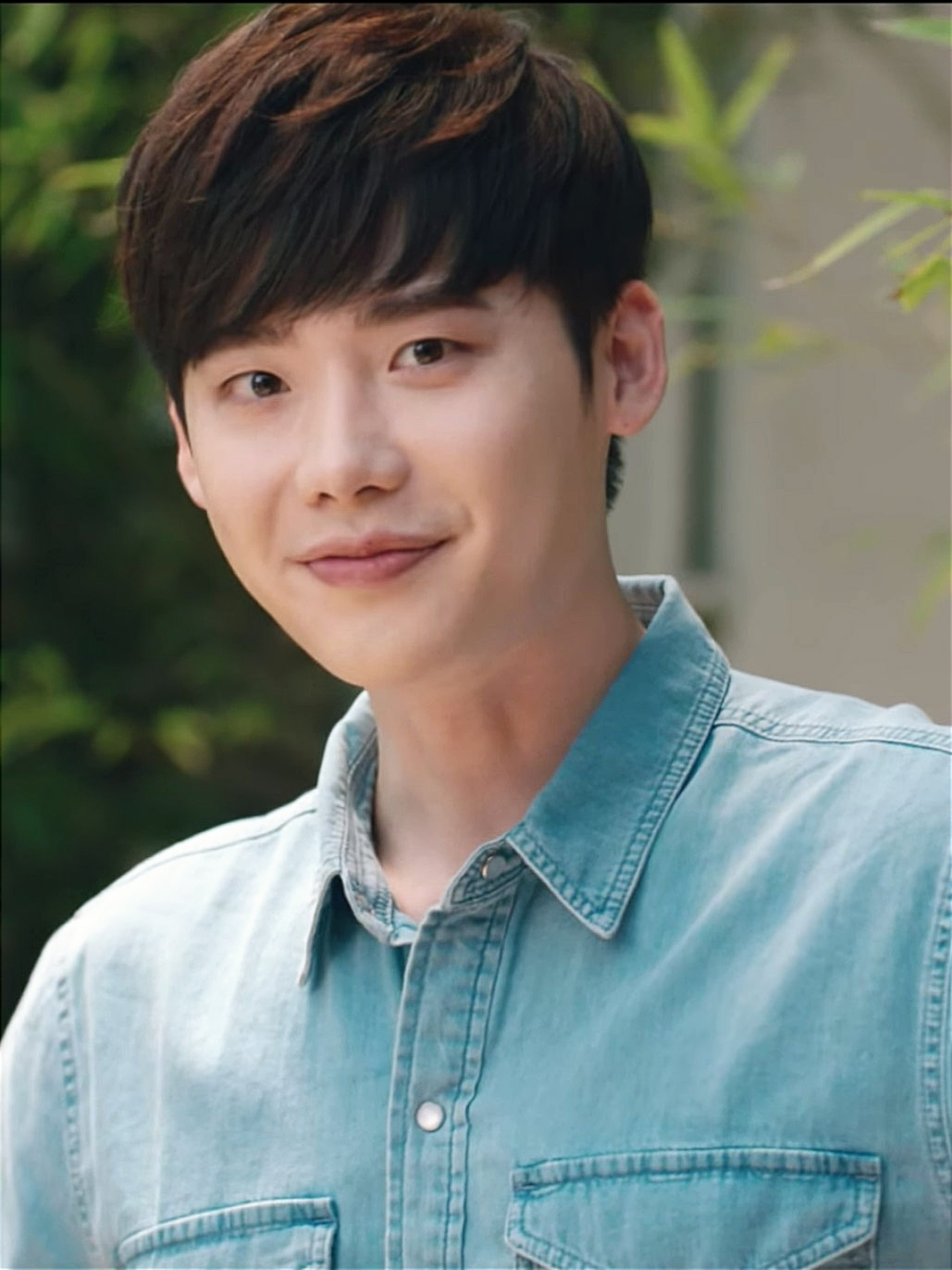
Lee Jong-suk, winner of Grand Prize (Daesang)

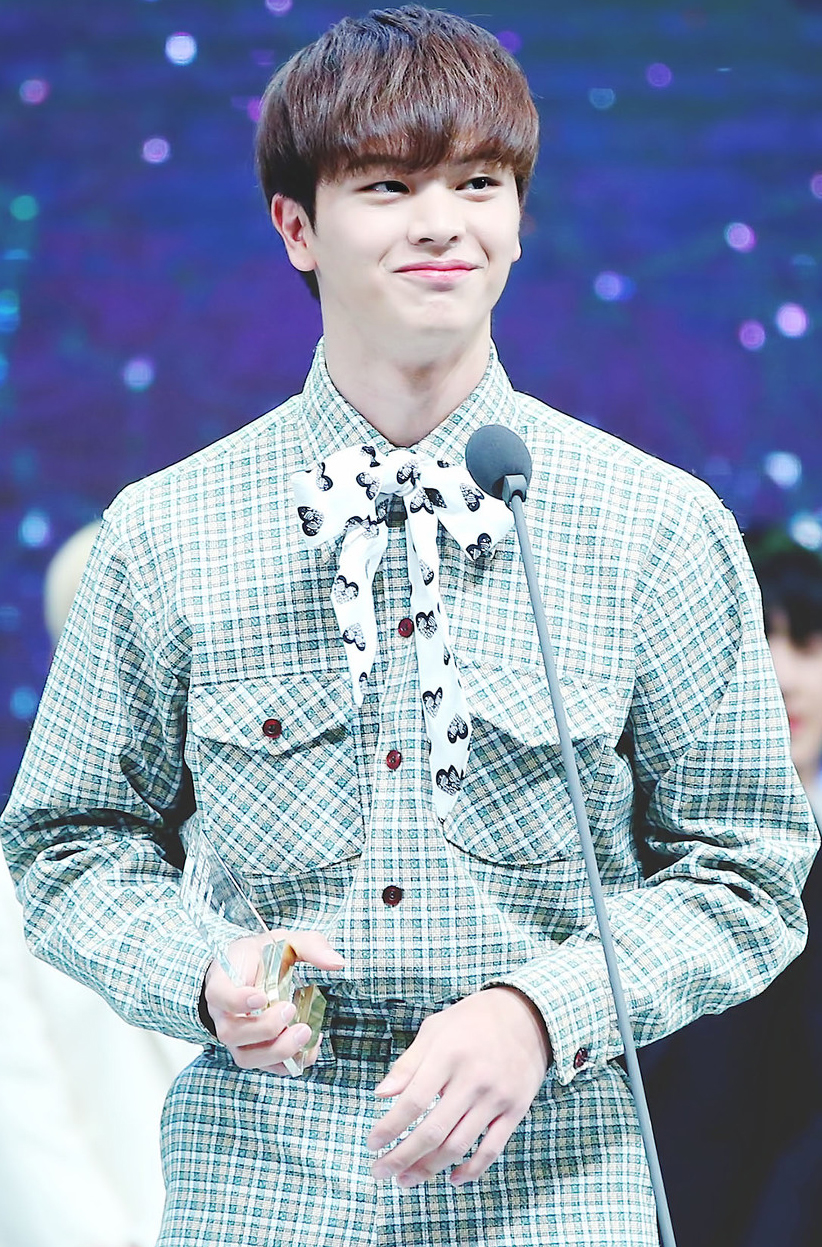
Yook Sung-jae, winner of Top Excellence Award, Actor in a Miniseries

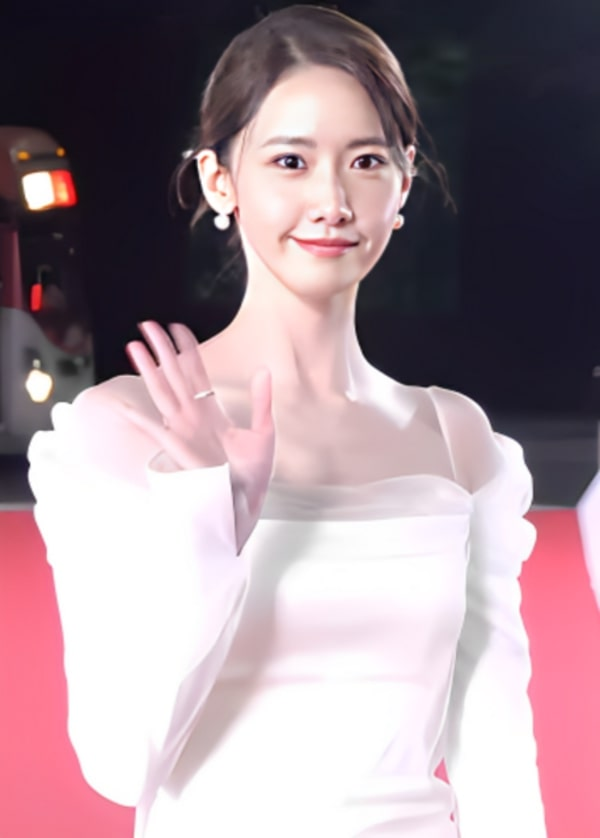
Im Yoon-ah, winner of Top Excellence Award, Actress in a Miniseries

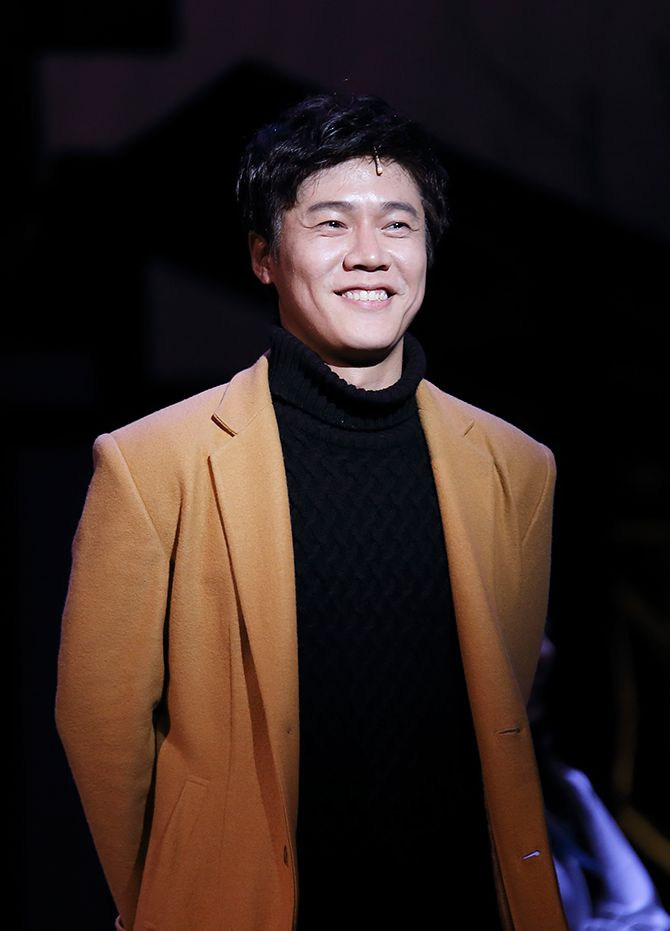
Park Ho-san, winner of Top Excellence Award, Actor in a Daily/Short Drama

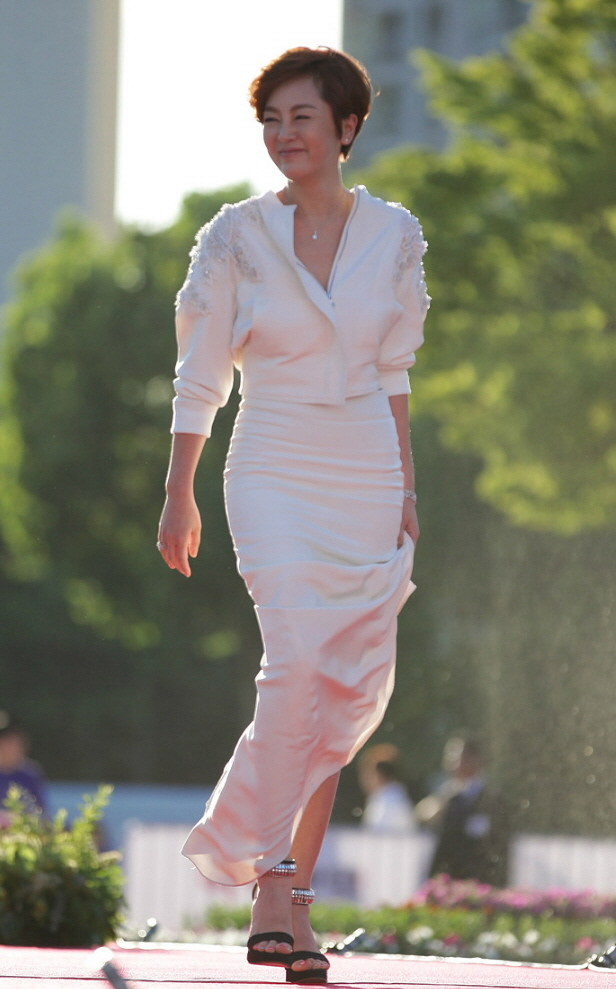
Lee Seung-yeon, winner of Top Excellence Award, Actress in a Daily/Short Drama

Winners denoted in bold

Grand Prize (Daesang)	Drama of the Year
**Lee Jong-suk – Big Mouth**	**Big Mouth**; The Golden Spoon; Tracer
Top Excellence Award, Actor in a Miniseries	Top Excellence Award, Actress in a Miniseries
**Yook Sung-jae – The Golden Spoon**; Lee Jong-suk – Big Mouth; Park Hae-jin – From Now On, Showtime!; Im Si-wan – Tracer; So Ji-sub – Doctor Lawyer	**Im Yoon-ah – Big Mouth**; Kim Hee-sun – Tomorrow; Im Soo-hyang – Doctor Lawyer; Jin Ki-joo – From Now On, Showtime!
Top Excellence Award, Actor in a Daily/Short Drama	Top Excellence Award, Actress in a Daily/Short Drama
**Park Ho-san – Hunted**; Yoon Park – Fanletter Please	**Lee Seung-yeon – The Secret House**; Lee Young-eun – The Secret House
Excellence Award, Actor in a Miniseries	Excellence Award, Actress in a Miniseries
**Kim Young-dae – The Forbidden Marriage**; Lee Jun-young – May I Help You?; Kim Joo-hun – Big Mouth; Rowoon – Tomorrow; Shin Sung-rok – Doctor Lawyer	**Lee Hye-ri – May I Help You?**; **Park Ju-hyun – The Forbidden Marriage**; Go Ah-sung – Tracer; Jung Chae-yeon – The Golden Spoon
Excellence Award, Actor in a Daily/Short Drama	Excellence Award, Actress in a Daily/Short Drama
**Seo Ha-joon – The Secret House**; Jung Heon – The Secret House; Lee Gyu-hoe – Hunted	**Choi Soo-young – Fanletter Please**; Kang Byul – The Secret House; Kim Soo-jin – Hunted
Best Supporting Actor	Best Supporting Actress
**Lee Chang-hoon – Tracer**; Jung Seok-yong – From Now On, Showtime!; Choi Dae-chul – The Golden Spoon; Lee Kyu-han – May I Help You?; Yang Dong-geun – The Forbidden Marriage	**Ye Soo-jung – Hunted**; Woo Hyun-joo – Doctor Lawyer; Han Chae-ah and Son Yeo-eun – The Golden Spoon; Hwang Jung-min – The Forbidden Marriage
Best New Actor	Best New Actress
**Lee Jong-won – The Golden Spoon**; Choi Jun-young – Tracer; Yoon Ji-on – Tomorrow; Song Duk-ho – May I Help You?; Kim Woo-seok – The Forbidden Marriage	**Yeonwoo – The Golden Spoon**; **Kim Min-ju – The Forbidden Marriage**; Park Seo-yeon – From Now On, Showtime!; Jung Min-ah – Doctor Lawyer; Han Dong-hee – May I Help You?
Best Couple Award	Lifetime Achievement Award
**Lee Jong-suk & Im Yoon-ah – Big Mouth**; Park Ju-hyun & Kim Young-dae – The Forbidden Marriage; Lee Hye-ri & Lee Jun-young – May I Help You?; Yook Sung-jae & Jung Chae-yeon – The Golden Spoon; Park Hae-jin & Jin Ki-joo – From Now On, Showtime!; Choi Soo-young & Yoon Park – Fanletter Please	**Hwang Geum-bong**
Best Character Award
**Choi Won-young – The Golden Spoon**; Chu Sang-mi and Park Yong-woo – Tracer; Jung Joon-ho – From Now On, Showtime!; Kim Hae-sook – Tomorrow; Yang Kyung-won – Big Mouth

== Presenters ==
Order	Presenter	Award
1	Kang Hoon, Kim Ji-eun	Best New Actor/Actress
2	Kim Do-hyun, Jang Hye-jin	Best Supporting Actor/Actress
3	Jung Moon-sung, Kim Hwan-hee	Excellence Award in a Daily/Short Drama
4	Lee Sang-yeob, Jang Young-nam	Excellence Award in a Miniseries
5	Cha Hak-yeon, Lee Mi-joo	Best Character Award
6	Uhm Hyun-kyung	Top Excellence Award in a Daily/Short Drama
7	Lee Jun-ho	Top Excellence Award in a Miniseries
8	Namkoong Min	Grand Prize (Daesang)

== Performance ==
- Itzy – "Cheshire + Sneakers"

== See also ==
- 2022 KBS Drama Awards
- 2022 SBS Drama Awards
