= Tracer (TV series) =

2022 South Korean television series

- Promotional poster
- Hangul: 트레이서
- RR: Teureiseo
- MR: T'ŭreisŏ
- Genre: Thriller; Action
- Created by: Wavve Studios
- Written by: Kim Hyun-jung
- Directed by: Lee Seung-young
- Starring: Im Si-wan; Go Ah-sung; Son Hyun-joo; Park Yong-woo
- Music by: Howl
- Country of origin: South Korea
- Original language: Korean
- No. of seasons: 2
- No. of episodes: 16

Production
- Producers: Kim Na-young; Kang Young-mo; Park Jae-seop
- Production company: West World Story

Original release
- Network: MBC TV
- Release: January 7 – March 25, 2022

Tracer (Korean: 트레이서) is a 2022 South Korean television series starring Im Si-wan, Go Ah-sung, Son Hyun-joo and Park Yong-woo. The series revolves around the people working at the National Tax Service. It is an original drama of OTT media service Wavve and is available for streaming on its platform. It also aired on MBC TV from January 7 to March 25, 2022.

== Series overview ==
=== Streaming ===
Season	Episodes	Originally released	
Season	Episodes	First released	Last released
1	8	January 7, 2022	January 28, 2022
2	8	February 18, 2022	

=== Television broadcast ===
Season	Episodes	Originally released	
Season	Episodes	First released	Last released
1	8	January 7, 2022	January 29, 2022
2	8	February 26, 2022	March 25, 2022

== Cast ==
=== Main ===
- Im Si-wan as Hwang Dong-joo, a former accountant who is now the head of the National Tax Service's Central Branch Tax Bureau.
  - Park Min-soo as young Hwang Dong-joo
- Go Ah-sung as Seo Hye-young, a team member of the 5th Bureau of Taxation.
- Son Hyun-joo as In Tae-joon, the head of the Central Regional Tax Service.
- Park Yong-woo as Oh Young, the manager of the 5th Bureau of Taxation.

=== Supporting ===
- Chu Sang-mi as Min So-jeong, deputy commissioner of the National Tax Service Headquarters.
- Park Ji-il as Baek Seung-ryong, commissioner of the National Tax Service Headquarters.
- Choi Jun-young as In Do-hoon, Tae-joon's son who is the director of Inspection Division of the Central Regional Tax Office.
- Kim Do-hyun as Cho Jin-gi
- Kim Gook-hee as Noh Sun-joo
- Yoo Dong-hun
- Jang Seong-yoon
- Moon Su-in as Kim Han-bin
- Lee Jung-shik as Kim Young-tae
- Yeon Je-wook as Park Seong-ho
- Moon Won-joo as Ko Dong-won
- Shin Hyun-jong
- Song Duk-ho as Lee Choong-ho
- Kang Seung-ho as Han Kyung-mo
- Jeon Bae-soo as Jang Jeong-il

=== Special appearances ===
- Park Ho-san as Hwang Chul-min, Dong-joo's father.
- Woo Hyun as Yang Young-soon, a non-tax payer of one billion won in clone funds.
- Im Seon-woo as Shin Da-hye, the director of Oz Foods who is being investigated for tax evasion by the five tax bureaus.
- Kim Tae-baek as Batnam, a whistleblower who accuses the unjust and brutal act of loan sharks.
- Kim Young-seong as the chief of Gold Cash.
- Lee Chang-hoon as Ryu Yong-shin, the financial director of PQ Group.
- Kim Soo-hyung as Hye-young's older sister.
- Jo Jun-hyung

== Original soundtrack ==
=== Part 1 ===
Released on January 7, 2022
No.	Title	Lyrics	Music	Artist	Length
1.	"Buzzer Beater"	Cho Yu-ri (Jam Factory)	Kim Myeong-kyu; Young Chance	A.C.E	2:58
2.	"Buzzer Beater" (Inst.)		Kim Myeong-kyu; Young Chance		2:58
Total length:					5:56

=== Part 2 ===
Released on January 8, 2022
No.	Title	Lyrics	Music	Artist	Length
1.	"Rest"	Zozo (Eldorado); Shin Sarah	Jang Won; Cha Dong-hoon	Salt N Paper	3:02
2.	"Rest" (Inst.)		Jang Won; Cha Dong-hoon		3:02
Total length:					6:04

=== Part 3 ===
Released on January 14, 2022
No.	Title	Lyrics	Music	Artist	Length
1.	"Dawn" (새벽)	Whoami (Jang Hee-won, Enchanter)	Whoami (Jang Hee-won, Enchanter)	Jang Hee-won	3:23
2.	"Dawn" (새벽; Inst.)		Whoami (Jang Hee-won, Enchanter)		3:23
Total length:					6:46

=== Part 4 ===
Released on January 21, 2022
No.	Title	Lyrics	Music	Artist	Length
1.	"Masquerade"	Jeff Kim; Limno (Eldorado)	Brown Code; Hanye; Jeff Kim	HeeJin (Loona), JinSoul (Loona)	3:12
2.	"Masquerade" (Inst.)		Brown Code; Hanye; Jeff Kim		3:12
Total length:					6:24

=== Part 5 ===
Released on January 28, 2022
No.	Title	Lyrics	Music	Artist	Length
1.	"Fire"	Im Si-wan; Nuvocity	Nuvocity	Im Si-wan	3:30
2.	"Fire" (Inst.)		Nuvocity		3:31
Total length:					7:01

=== Part 6 ===
Released on January 29, 2022
No.	Title	Lyrics	Music	Artist	Length
1.	"One & Only"	Jeff Kim; Hanye; Limno (Eldorado)	Jeong Do-young; Hanye	Suran	3:34
2.	"One & Only" (Inst.)		Jeong Do-young; Hanye		3:34
Total length:					7:08

== Viewership ==
Tracer : South Korea viewers per episode (millions)

Season	Episode number								Average
Season	1	2	3	4	5	6	7	8	Average
1	1.316	1.117	1.488	1.336	1.428	1.421	1.315	1.379	1.332
2	0.896	1.085	0.786	1.067	N/A	1.307	1.007	1.520	N/A

Source: Audience measurement performed nationwide by Nielsen Korea.

Average TV viewership ratings
Ep.	Original broadcast date	Average audience share		
Ep.	Original broadcast date	Nielsen Korea		TNmS
Ep.	Original broadcast date	Nationwide	Seoul	Nationwide
Season 1
1	January 7, 2022	7.4% (11th)	8.0% (9th)	5.9% (11th)
2	January 8, 2022	6.0% (13th)	6.5% (10th)	4.4% (18th)
3	January 14, 2022	8.6% (7th)	9.0%	6.5% (9th)
4	January 15, 2022	7.7% (6th)	8.7% (3rd)	5.5% (14th)
5	January 21, 2022	8.0% (8th)	8.7% (8th)	5.9% (10th)
6	January 22, 2022	7.8% (6th)	8.6% (2nd)	4.9% (18th)
7	January 28, 2022	7.8% (8th)	8.1% (8th)	5.6% (13th)
8	January 29, 2022	7.6% (6th)	8.0% (2nd)	5.1% (15th)
Average		7.6%	8.2%	5.4%
Season 2
9	February 26, 2022 (Note: Television broadcast for season 2 started on February 26, 2022 due to the broadcast of 2022 Winter Olympics and the debate of the 20th South Korean presidential election candidates.)	5.0% (19th)	5.0% (18th)	N/A
10	February 26, 2022	6.2% (11th)	6.4% (9th)	N/A
11	March 5, 2022 (Note: The series was canceled on March 4, 2022 due to the broadcast of a news special.)	4.6% (18th)	4.8% (15th)	4.4% (18th)
12	March 11, 2022	6.5% (9th)	6.9% (9th)	4.8% (18th)
13	March 12, 2022	4.1% (21st)	4.3% (20th)	N/A
14	March 18, 2022	8.1% (7th)	8.5% (5th)	4.8% (15th)
15	March 19, 2022	6.1% (13th)	6.5% (10th)	4.5% (19th)
16	March 25, 2022	9.0% (5th)	9.8% (4th)	6.0% (11th)
Average		6.2%	6.5%	— (Note: Due to some unpublished ratings, the exact average rating is unknown.)
In the table above, the blue numbers represent the lowest ratings and the red numbers represent the highest ratings.; N/A denotes ratings that were not released.

== Awards and nominations ==
Name of the award ceremony, year presented, category, nominee of the award, and the result of the nomination
Award ceremony	Year	Category	Nominee / Work	Result	Ref.
Asia Contents Awards	2022	Best Actor	Im Si-wan	Nominated	
Asia Contents Awards	2022	Best Supporting Actor	Park Yong-woo	Nominated	
APAN Star Awards	2022	Top Excellence Award, Actor in an OTT Drama	Im Si-wan	Nominated	
Baeksang Arts Awards	2022	Best Actor – Television	Im Si-wan	Nominated	
Blue Dragon Series Awards	2022	Best Actor	Im Si-wan	Nominated	
MBC Drama Awards	2022	Best Supporting Actor	Lee Chang-hoon	Won	
MBC Drama Awards	2022	Top Excellence Award, Actor in a Miniseries	Im Si-wan	Nominated	
MBC Drama Awards	2022	Excellence Award, Actress in a Miniseries	Go Ah-sung	Nominated	
MBC Drama Awards	2022	Best New Actor	Choi Jun-young	Nominated	
MBC Drama Awards	2022	Best Character Award	Chu Sang-mi	Nominated	
MBC Drama Awards	2022	Best Character Award	Park Yong-woo	Nominated	
