= Ahn Si-ha =

South Korean actress

- Born: Ahn Si-ha; 11 March 1982 (age 44); Uijeongbu, South Korea
- Other name: Ahn Shi-ha
- Education: Kyungmin University (Department of Musical)
- Occupation: Actress
- Years active: 2004–present
- Agents: Studio & New; Big Whale Entertainment
- Known for: Moonshine; Delayed Justice; All of Us Are Dead
- Spouse: Unknown (m. 2024)
- Children: 1

Korean name
- Hangul: 안시하
- RR: An Siha
- MR: An Siha

Ahn Si-ha (Korean: 안시하; born 11 March 1982) is a South Korean actress and musical actress. She is best known for her roles in dramas such as Moonshine, Delayed Justice, The King: Eternal Monarch and All of Us Are Dead.

== Personal life ==
On June 8, 2025, Ahn announced that she had gotten married last December and was expecting a child. Ahn gave birth to a son on August 29, 2025.

== Filmography ==
=== Television series ===
Year	Title	Role	Ref.
2020	The King: Eternal Monarch	Kim Hee-joo	
2020	The Good Detective	Jung Yoo-seon	
2020	Delayed Justice	Hwang Min-kyung	
2020	Awaken	Jo Hyun-hee	
2021	Hospital Playlist 2	Kim Soo-jung	
2021	Moonshine	Lee Kyung-bin	
2022	All of Us Are Dead	Kim Kyung-mi	
2023	Longing for You	Kim Mi-ro / Ma-ri	
2024	Captivating the King	Queen Kim	

=== Film ===
Year	Title		Role	Ref.
Year	English	Korean	Role	Ref.
2019	The Beast	비스트	Jung-yeon	

== Theatre ==
Year	Title	Korean Title	Role
2012	Aida	아이다	Amneris
2013	Moon Embracing the Sun	해를 품은 달	Heo Yeon-woo
2014	Zorro	조로	Luisa
2015	Rudolf	황태자 루돌프	Mary Vetsera
2015	Chess	체스	Florence
2015	Cinderella	신데렐라	Cinderella
2016	All Shook Up	올슉업	Natalie Haller
2017	From the Bottom	밑바닥에서	Vasilisa
2017	Ben-Hur	벤허	Esther
2017	Geumgang, 1894	금강, 1894	In jin-ah
2018	The Three Musketeers	삼총사	Milady de Winter
2018	Frankenstein	프랑켄슈타인	Julia & Catherine

== Awards and nominations ==
Name of the award ceremony, year presented, category, nominee of the award, and the result of the nomination
Award ceremony	Year	Category	Result	Ref.
8th Musical Awards	2014	Best New Actress Award	Won	
