= Delayed Justice =

2020 South Korean television series

- Promotional poster
- Also known as: Fly Dragon
- Hangul: 날아라 개천용
- Lit.: Fly From Rags To Riches
- RR: Narara gaecheonyong
- MR: Narara kaech'ŏnyong
- Genre: Crime drama; Legal drama
- Created by: Cho Sung hoon Studio S (SBS)
- Written by: Park Sang-gyu
- Directed by: Kwak Jung-hwan
- Starring: Kwon Sang-woo; Bae Seong-woo; Jung Woo-sung; Kim Ju-hyeon; Jung Woong-in
- Country of origin: South Korea
- Original language: Korean
- No. of episodes: 20

Production
- Executive producer: Hong Seong chang (SBS)
- Producers: Kim Woo-taek; Jang Kyung-ik
- Running time: 60 minutes
- Production company: Studio&NEW

Original release
- Network: SBS TV
- Release: October 30, 2020 – January 23, 2021

Delayed Justice (Korean: 날아라 개천용) is a South Korean television series starring Kwon Sang-woo, Bae Seong-woo (replaced by Jung Woo-sung midway through the drama), Kim Ju-hyeon and Jung Woong-in. It aired on SBS TV from October 30, 2020 to January 23, 2021 every Friday and Saturday at 22:00 (KST). The director and producer of this drama told the media in a press conference that it is based on real-life actual events, though the incidents, names and places are altered.

== Synopsis ==
A high school graduate, yet full of zest and keen sense of justice managed to pass the bar examination to be a qualified barrister-at-law against miscarriage of justice. An atypical but empathetic senior reporter and his passionate junior reporter, teamed up to defend and fight for judicial victims who are falsely accused, wrongfully convicted or maliciously prosecuted.

Inspired by the true stories of real-life lawyer Park Joon-young and journalist Park Sang-kyu, who succeeded in obtaining retrials for people who had been wrongfully convicted, wherein a 1999 case in which three innocent people were convicted of robbery and murder, and in 2000, the murder of a taxi driver at the Yakchon five-way intersection in Iksan, North Jeolla Province.

== Cast ==
=== Main ===
- Kwon Sang-woo as Park Tae-yong
  - Park Sang-hoon as young Park Tae-yong

A public defender. Born in a rural town, he managed to pass the bar exam without attending college. Full of zest and keen sense of justice, he became a defence barrister, advocate and solicitor to defend and fight for judicial victims who are falsely accused, wrongfully convicted or maliciously prosecuted.

- Bae Seong-woo / Jung Woo-sung as Park Sam-soo

Graduated from a lesser-known college and in spite of his atypical personality, he is a competent and empathetic reporter.

- Kim Ju-hyeon as Lee Yoo-kyung

A passionate newbie reporter. She admires her senior Park Sam-soo, albeit sometimes frustrated by his atypical work antics.

- Jung Woong-in as Jang Yoon-seok

A senior prosecutor. He was born in the rural countryside, yet rose quickly in his government legal service career due to his public relations and lobbying skills.

=== Supporting ===
- Kim Eung-soo as Kang Cheol-woo
- Jo Sung-ha as Jo Ki-soo
- Kim Kap-soo as Kim Hyung-chun
- Lee Won-jong as Han Sang-man
- Ahn Si-ha as Hwang Min-kyung
- Park Ji-il as Kim Byung-dae
- Lee Soon-won as Kim Gwi-hyun
- Kim Hye-hwa as Lee Jin-sil
- Lee Cheol-min as Ahn Young-kwon
- Jeon Jin-gi as Tak Jae-hyung
- Cha Soon-bae as Moon Joo-hyung

=== Special appearances ===
- Lee Jung-jae as Jang Tae-joon (Ep. 19)
- Lee Elijah as Yoon Hye-won
- Jung Woo-sung as Park Sam-soo (Ep. 17-20)
- Lee Jong-hyuk as Heo Sung-yoon (Ep. 18-20)

== Ratings ==
Delayed Justice : South Korea viewers per episode (thousands)

| Season | Episode number | | | | | | | | | | | | | | | | | | | | Average |
| Season | 1 | 2 | 3 | 4 | 5 | 6 | 7 | 8 | 9 | 10 | 11 | 12 | 13 | 14 | 15 | 16 | 17 | 18 | 19 | 20 | Average |
|---|---|---|---|---|---|---|---|---|---|---|---|---|---|---|---|---|---|---|---|---|---|
| 1 | 983 | 1162 | TBD | TBD | TBD | TBD | 1323 | TBD | TBD | TBD | TBD | TBD | TBD | TBD | TBD | TBD | TBD | TBD | TBD | TBD | TBD |

Source: Audience measurement performed nationwide by Nielsen Korea.

Average TV viewership ratings
| Ep. | Part | Original broadcast date | Average audience share (Nielsen Korea) | |
| Ep. | Part | Original broadcast date | Nationwide | Seoul |
|---|---|---|---|---|
| 1 | 1 | October 30, 2020 | 4.6% (NR) | 5.4% (19th) |
| 1 | 2 | October 30, 2020 | 5.2% (19th) | 6.0% (16th) |
| 2 | 1 | October 31, 2020 | 4.7% (NR) | —N/a |
| 2 | 2 | October 31, 2020 | 6.7% (12th) | 7.3% (11th) |
| 3 | 1 | November 6, 2020 | 4.3% (NR) | —N/a |
| 3 | 2 | November 6, 2020 | 5.4% (18th) | 5.8% (17th) |
| 4 | 1 | November 7, 2020 | 4.1% (NR) | —N/a |
| 4 | 2 | November 7, 2020 | 5.6% (17th) | 6.0% (12th) |
| 5 | 1 | November 13, 2020 | 4.1% (NR) | —N/a |
| 5 | 2 | November 13, 2020 | 5.9% (15th) | 6.2% (12th) |
| 6 | 1 | November 20, 2020 | 4.5% (NR) | —N/a |
| 6 | 2 | November 20, 2020 | 5.1% (20th) | 5.1% (20th) |
| 7 | 1 | November 21, 2020 | 4.5% (NR) | 4.5% (NR) |
| 7 | 2 | November 21, 2020 | 6.7% (13th) | 6.8% (13th) |
| 8 | 1 | November 27, 2020 | 4.6% (NR) | —N/a |
| 8 | 2 | November 27, 2020 | 5.4% (19th) | 5.6% (20th) |
| 9 | 1 | November 28, 2020 | 4.8% (NR) | —N/a |
| 9 | 2 | November 28, 2020 | 6.7% (14th) | 6.5% (15th) |
| 10 | 1 | December 4, 2020 | 4.7% (NR) | —N/a |
| 10 | 2 | December 4, 2020 | 6.6% (14th) | 6.6% (13th) |
| 11 | 1 | December 5, 2020 | 4.7% (NR) | —N/a |
| 11 | 2 | December 5, 2020 | 6.1% (15th) | 6.5% (12th) |
| 12 | 1 | December 12, 2020 | 3.9% (NR) | —N/a |
| 12 | 2 | December 12, 2020 | 5.0% (NR) | —N/a |
| 13 | 1 | January 1, 2021 | 5.3% (NR) | —N/a |
| 13 | 2 | January 1, 2021 | 5.8% (NR) | —N/a |
| 14 | 1 | January 2, 2021 | 3.5% (NR) | —N/a |
| 14 | 2 | January 2, 2021 | 4.6% (NR) | —N/a |
| 15 | 1 | January 8, 2021 | 4.5% (NR) | —N/a |
| 15 | 2 | January 8, 2021 | 5.2% (NR) | —N/a |
| 16 | 1 | January 9, 2021 | 4.3% (NR) | —N/a |
| 16 | 2 | January 9, 2021 | 5.4% (NR) | —N/a |
| 17 | 1 | January 15, 2021 | 4.7% (NR) | —N/a |
| 17 | 2 | January 15, 2021 | 5.6% (18th) | 5.6% (17th) |
| 18 | 1 | January 16, 2021 | 4.5% (NR) | —N/a |
| 18 | 2 | January 16, 2021 | 5.5% (NR) | —N/a |
| 19 | 1 | January 22, 2021 | 4.7% (NR) | 5.3% |
| 19 | 2 | January 22, 2021 | 5.4% (NR) | 6.1% |
| 20 | 1 | January 23, 2021 | 3.9% (NR) | —N/a |
| 20 | 2 | January 23, 2021 | 6.2% (NR) | 6.8% |
| Average | | | 5.1% | — (Note: Due to some ratings not recorded, the exact average rating is unknown.) |
In the table above, the blue numbers represent the lowest ratings and the red numbers represent the highest ratings.; NR denotes that the drama did not rank in the top 20 daily programs on that date.; N/A denotes that the rating is not known.
