= May I Help You? =

2022 South Korean television series

- Promotional poster
- Also known as: One Hundred Won Butler
- Hangul: 일당백집사
- Hanja: 一當百執事
- RR: Ildangbaekjipsa
- MR: Ildangbaekchipsa
- Genre: Fantasy; Romantic comedy
- Developed by: Kim Ho-jun; Namgung Seong-woo
- Written by: Lee Sun-hye
- Directed by: Shim Soo-yeon; Park Sun-young
- Starring: Lee Hye-ri; Lee Jun-young
- Music by: Kim Joon-seok; Jeong Se-rin
- Country of origin: South Korea
- Original language: Korean
- No. of episodes: 16

Production
- Executive producers: Kim Hong-seop (CP); Yoo Mo-yeol (CP)
- Producers: Jeon Yong-joo; Kim Chang-mi
- Camera setup: Single-camera
- Running time: 70 minutes
- Production company: IWill Media

Original release
- Network: MBC TV
- Release: October 19 – December 22, 2022

May I Help You? (Korean: 일당백집사) is a South Korean television series directed by Shim Soo-yeon and starring Lee Hye-ri and Lee Jun-young. It premiered on MBC TV on October 19, 2022, and aired every Wednesday and Thursday at 21:50 (KST).

== Synopsis ==
Kim Tae-Hee (Lee Jun-young), a man who performs errands at his uncle's company, "A Dime a Job", and Baek Dong-ju (Lee Hye-ri), a funeral director who grants the wishes of the deceased.

== Cast ==
=== Main ===
- Lee Hye-ri as Baek Dong-ju, a funeral director who gives everything in order to fulfill the last wishes of the deceased.
- Lee Jun-young as Kim Tae-hee, the only employee of Ildangbaek, which is a daily errand service. He was formerly a Doctor before an incident that occurred that made him quit

=== Supporting ===
==== Ildangbaek House ====
- Song Duk-ho as Seo Hae-ahn, a police officer.
- Lee Kyu-han as Vincent, the youngest and troubled uncle of Kim Tae-Hee and the CEO of Ildangbaek.

==== Eonju University Hospital Funeral Hall ====
- Tae In-ho as Im Il-seop, a funeral director.

==== Dong-ju's family ====
- Park Soo-young as Baek Dal-sik, Baek Dong-ju's father.
- Oh Dae-hwan as Michael Baek, Baek Dong-ju's uncle and chief priest of Bongsu-dong Temple.

==== Dong-ju's friends ====
- Seo Hye-won as Yoo So-ra, Baek Dong-ju's friend.
- Ahn Hyun-ho as Hyun Jeong-hwa, Instructor of the table tennis club.

=== Extended ===
- Han Dong-hee as Tak Chung-ha, Butler Kim's ex-girlfriend and doctor of emergency medicine.
- Ahn Nae-sang as Kim Jun-ho, the taxi driver died in an accident and lost the trust of his son.
- Jo Ah-young as Park Seo-rin, a Student who died young from illness.
- Kim Ha-eon as Kim Jun-ho, Kim Tae-hee's younger brother.
- Hong Nah-hyun as So-gang, A mother who faced a tragic death.
- Kwak Ja-hyung as Seok-cheol, who works as a backup driver during the day and as a backup driver at night Sudden death without saying goodbye He asked Dong Ju to find a check for 100 million won that he had hidden and send it to his wife.

=== Special appearance ===
- Seo Young-hee as Choi Yeon-hee, The deceased died without being able to report the affair of her husband and close friend.
- Suh Hyo-won as Table tennis player
- Jang Sung-kyu as DJ
- Lee Eun-joo as daughter-in-law who has to go through many events.

== Original soundtrack ==
=== Part 1 ===
Released on October 20, 2022
No.	Title	Lyrics	Music	Artist	Length
1.	"Pray"	Song Yang-ha; Kim Jae-hyun; Lee Joo-ah	Song Yang-ha; Kim Jae-hyun; Vlue	Lee Won-suk	3:11
2.	"Pray" (Inst.)		Song Yang-ha; Kim Jae-hyun; Vlue		3:11
Total length:					6:22

=== Part 2 ===
Released on October 27, 2022
No.	Title	Lyrics	Music	Artist	Length
1.	"Reminiscence" (보고 싶다 널 가득 안고 싶다)	Kim Chang-rak (Aiming); Kim Soo-bin (Aiming); Yoon Kyung-won (Onclassa)	Kim Chang-rak (Aiming); Kim Soo-bin (Aiming); Jo Se-hee (Aiming)	Jung Joon-il	4:00
2.	"Reminiscence" (보고 싶다 널 가득 안고 싶다; Inst.)		Kim Chang-rak (Aiming); Kim Soo-bin (Aiming); Jo Se-hee (Aiming)		4:00
Total length:					8:00

== Viewership ==
May I Help You? : South Korea viewers per episode (thousands)

Season	Episode number																Average
Season	1	2	3	4	5	6	7	8	9	10	11	12	13	14	15	16	Average
1	653	587	N/A	581	N/A	N/A	N/A	705	N/A	N/A	N/A	548	N/A	608	N/A	560	N/A

Source: Audience measurement performed nationwide by Nielsen Korea.

Average TV viewership ratings
Ep.	Original broadcast date	Average audience share (Nielsen Korea)	
Ep.	Original broadcast date	Nationwide	Seoul
1	October 19, 2022	3.9% (16th)	3.9% (15th)
2	October 20, 2022	3.7% (18th)	3.9% (15th)
3	October 26, 2022	3.0% (22nd)	N/A
4	October 27, 2022	3.6% (18th)	3.6% (16th)
5	November 9, 2022 (Note: Episodes 5 and 6 were delayed one week due to Itaewon disaster, and will air on November 9th and 10th.)	2.1% (31st)	N/A
6	November 10, 2022	2.5% (28th)	N/A
7	November 16, 2022	2.7% (25th)	N/A
8	November 17, 2022	4.0% (16th)	4.2% (14th)
9	November 30, 2022 (Note: Episodes 9 and 10 were delayed one week due to World Cup 2022, and will air on November 30th and December 1st.)	2.6% (27th)	N/A
10	December 1, 2022	3.5% (21st)	N/A
11	December 7, 2022	3.0% (25th)	N/A
12	December 8, 2022	3.1% (22nd)	N/A
13	December 14, 2022	2.6% (27th)	N/A
14	December 15, 2022	3.3% (24th)	N/A
15	December 21, 2022	2.7% (25th)	N/A
16	December 22, 2022	3.2% (20th)	3.7% (19th)
Average		3.1%	— (Note: Due to some ratings not recorded, the exact average rating is unknown.)
In the table above, the blue numbers represent the lowest ratings and the red numbers represent the highest ratings.; N/A denotes ratings that were not released.

== Awards and nominations ==
Name of the award ceremony, year presented, category, nominee of the award, and the result of the nomination
Award ceremony	Year	Category	Nominee / Work	Result	Ref.
MBC Drama Awards	2022	Excellence Award, Actress in a Miniseries	Lee Hye-ri	Won	
MBC Drama Awards	2022	Excellence Award, Actor in a Miniseries	Lee Jun-young	Nominated	
MBC Drama Awards	2022	Best Couple Award	Lee Hye-ri and Lee Jun-young	Nominated	
