= Schoolgirl Detectives =

South Korean television series

- Promotional poster
- Also known as: Detectives of Seonam Girls' High School; Sunam Girls High School Detectives; Sunam Girls High School Detective Team
- Genre: Teen; Mystery; Romance; Comedy
- Based on: Seonam Girls High School Investigators by Park Ha-ik
- Written by: Shin Kwang-ho
- Directed by: Yeo Woon-hyuk; Yoo Jung-hwan
- Starring: Jin Ji-hee; Kang Min-ah; Lee Hye-ri; Lee Min-ji; Stephanie Lee; Kim Min-jun
- Country of origin: South Korea
- Original language: Korean
- No. of episodes: 14

Production
- Executive producer: Yeo Woon-hyuk
- Producers: Jung Ah-reum; Park Hyun-seo
- Production location: Seoul
- Editor: Shin Ki-hwan
- Running time: 60 minutes Wednesdays at 23:00 (KST)
- Production companies: Wellmade Yedang; Happy Campus Projects

Original release
- Network: jTBC
- Release: December 16, 2014 – March 17, 2015

Schoolgirl Detectives (Korean: 선암여고 탐정단; Hanja: 선암女高 探偵團; RR: Seonamyeogo tamjeongdan; lit. 'Seonam Girls High School Detectives') is a South Korean television series based on the novel of the same title by Park Ha-ik. Starring Jin Ji-hee, Kang Min-ah, Lee Hye-ri, Lee Min-ji, Stephanie Lee, and Kim Min-jun, it aired on jTBC from December 16, 2014, to March 17, 2015, for 14 episodes.

The series notably featured the first onscreen lesbian kiss on South Korean television. A complaint was later filed with the Korea Communications Standards Commission, but civic groups such as LGBT awareness organization Rainbow Action against Sexual Minority Discrimination criticized such deliberations even taking place.

== Synopsis ==
Five students at the Seonam Girls' High School, Ahn Chae-yool (a classy girl, new to the school); Yoon Mi-do (the leader known as the school weirdo); Lee Yee-hee (wannabe actress/idol); Kim Ha-jae (computing expert); Choi Sung-yoon (baker and fellow peacemaker) form a detective club, and set out to solve mysteries around them, some involving bullying, abortion, and suicide.

== Cast ==
=== Main ===
- Jin Ji-hee as Ahn Chae-yool, a super-smart transfer student who unwillingly joins the high school detective club
- Kang Min-ah as Yoon Mi-do, the leader of the detective club
- Lee Hye-ri as Lee Ye-hee, a member of the detective club who wants to become an actress
- Lee Min-ji as Kim Ha-jae, a member of the detective club who is an expert about computers
- Stephanie Lee as Choi Sung-yoon, a member of the detective club who is very tall and enjoys baking
- Kim Min-jun as Ha Yeon-joon, a wise teacher who may have a mysterious past

=== Supporting ===
People around Ahn Chae-yool

- Han Ye-joon as Ha Ra-ohn, Yeon-joon's nephew
- Lee Seung-yeon as Oh Yoo-jin, Chae-yool's mother
- Jang Ki-yong as Ahn Chae-joon, Chae-yool's older brother
- Choi Deok-moon as Ahn Hong-min, Chae-yool's father

Students

- Cho Shi-yoon as Oh Hae-ni, president of Class 1–3
- Han Ji-an as Nam Hyo-jo, school bully from Class 1–3
- Heyne as Hong Dani, theater club senior member and Ye-hee's rival
- Kyung Ji-eun as Seo Yi-na, theater club senior and Dani's friend
- Jung Yeon-joo as Park Se-yoo, a senior student who wants to find her rabbit doll
- Cheon Young-min as Jo Ah-ra, a student in trouble about her father's bakery
- Kim So-hye as Han Soo-yeon, a senior class accused of porn video and homosexuality
- Kang Sung-ah as Park Eun-bin, Soo-yeon's girlfriend
- Han Seo-jin as Hwang Hye-ra, a senior class who commits fraud for the sake of justice.
- Lee Joo-woo as Choi Mi-rae, an ex-student who committed suicide
- Choi Joo-ri as Shim Yoon-kyung, Mi-rae's classmate

Teachers

- Hwang Seok-jeong as Lee Yeo-joo, the principal of Seonam Girls' High School
- Kim Sung-yoon as Jung Dong-soo, homeroom teacher of Class 1–3
- Kim Hye-na as Shin Jang-mi, English language teacher

Extended

- Lee Jung-hwan as Biting Man
- Lee Jae-kyun as Choi Chang-hyun, Se-yoon's ex-boyfriend
- Kim Byung-choon as Bakery owner, Ah-ra's father
- Kim Jung-kyun as Mi-do's father
- Guillaume Patry as Chae-joon's friend
- Kang Joo-hee as MC
- Hwang Shin-jung as Ra-ohn's stepmother
- Bae Young-joon as Ra-ohn's manager
- Baek Bong-ki as Kyung Jang-hyun, MU Entertainment caretaker
- Kim Young-sun as Go Mi-ja, Chang-hyun's mother
- Lee Byung-wook as Han In-soo, doctor
