= Kim Soon-ok (screenwriter) =

South Korean television screenwriter (born 1971)

- Born: May 25, 1971 (age 55); South Korea
- Education: Ewha Womans University – Korean Language and Literature
- Occupation: Screenwriter
- Years active: 2000–present
- Agent(s): Jidam Inc. (formerly Yein E&M) (2012 to 2016); SM Life Design Group (2017 to 2019); Chorokbaem Media (2020 to present)

Korean name
- Hangul: 김순옥
- RR: Gim Sunok
- MR: Kim Sunok

Kim Soon-ok (Korean: 김순옥; born May 25, 1971) is a South Korean television screenwriter. Kim is best known for writing the television dramas Temptation of Wife (2008–2009) and its spiritual successor Temptation of an Angel (2009), Jang Bo-ri is Here! (2014), My Daughter, Geum Sa-wol (2015–16), and The Penthouse: War in Life (2020–21), all of which are criticized for their provocative themes but are currently the highest-rated dramas ever aired in their respective time slots.

Following the commercial failure of The Escape of the Seven (2023-24), Kim began to move away from the melodrama genre that earned her the title of "ratings queen." She was belatedly revealed to have written the 2025 late-night musical youth drama Spring of Youth under the pen name Kim Min-cheol, a day after the miniseries ended with an average rating of 0.9% despite airing on a terrestrial television network.

Kim is also credited as the creator of two cable dramas: the revenge thriller Pandora: Beneath the Paradise (2023) and Reborn Rookie (2026), the adaptation of the fantasy web novel The New Employee Chairman Kang by San Kyung.

== Filmography ==
=== As writer ===
Title	Korean title	Cast	Director	Broadcaster and timeslot	Broadcast period	Episodes	Highest rating	Lowest rating	Average rating
MBC Best Theater: "Respect For Love"	MBC 베스트극장 - 사랑에 대한 예의	Kim Jung-nan, Kim Il-woo	Im Hwa-min	MBC, Friday 10:55 p.m.	August 4, 2000 (episode 413)	1	N/A	N/A	N/A
MBC Best Theater: "Father's Autumn"	MBC 베스트극장 - 아버지의 가을	Lee Ho-jae, Jung Seung-ho, Kim Hae-sook	Im Hwa-min	MBC, Friday 10:55 p.m.	October 13, 2000 (episode 421)	1	N/A	N/A	N/A
MBC Best Theater: "Fish at the End of the Sea"	MBC 베스트극장 - 바다 끝 물고기	Ha Jae-young, Shin Eun-jung, Lee Dong-wook	Im Hwa-min	MBC, Friday 10:50 p.m.	August 3, 2001 (episode 455)	1	N/A	N/A	N/A
MBC Best Theater: "Till Winter Goes Away"	MBC 베스트극장 - 겨울이 갈 때까지	Kim Hae-sook, Myung Gye-nam	Choi Won-seok	MBC, Friday 9:55 p.m.	January 11, 2002 (episode 475)	1	N/A	N/A	N/A
MBC Best Theater: "Baking Bungeoppang in Heaven"	MBC 베스트극장 - 붕어빵을 굽도다... 천국에서	Song Ok-sook	Choi Nak-kwon	MBC, Friday 9:55 p.m.	October 25, 2002 (episode 510)	1	N/A	N/A	N/A
Freezing Point	빙점	Choi Soo-ji, Sunwoo Jae-duk, Yoo Tae-woong, Kim Hyun-jung	Kang Byung-moon	MBC, Monday-Saturday 9:00 a.m.	October 4, 2004 – January 8, 2005	82	N/A	N/A	N/A
Hearts of Destiny	그래도 좋아!	Kim Ji-ho, Lee Chang-hoon, Go Eun-mi, Shim Hyung-tak	Kim Woo-seon	MBC, Monday-Friday 7:50 a.m.	October 1, 2007 – April 11, 2008	138	23.4%	7.6%	16.4%
Temptation of Wife	아내의 유혹	Jang Seo-hee, Kim Seo-hyung, Byun Woo-min, Lee Jae-hwang, Jung Ae-ri	Oh Se-kang	SBS, Monday-Friday 7:20 p.m.	November 3, 2008 – May 1, 2009	129	37.5%	11.7%	26.8%
Temptation of an Angel	천사의 유혹	Bae Soo-bin, Han Sang-jin, Lee So-yeon, Jin Tae-hyun, Hong Soo-hyun	Son Jung-hyun	SBS, Monday-Tuesday 8:50 p.m.	October 12, 2009 – December 22, 2009	21	22.6%	10.0%	17.0%
Smile, Mom	웃어요, 엄마	Yoon Jung-hee, Lee Jae-hwang, Go Eun-mi, Lee Mi-sook, Kang Min-kyung, Kim Jin-woo, Seo Jun-young	Hong Sung-chang	SBS, Saturday-Sunday 8:50 p.m.	November 6, 2010 – April 24, 2011	50	17.0%	9.7%	13.3%
Five Fingers	다섯 손가락	Chae Shi-ra, Ju Ji-hoon, Ji Chang-wook, Jin Se-yeon	Choi Young-hoon	SBS, Saturday-Sunday 9:50 p.m.	August 18, 2012 – November 25, 2012	30	14.1%	8.4%	11.4%
The Birth of a Family	가족의 탄생	Lee So-yeon, Lee Kyu-han, Sung Hoon, Lee Chae-young, Kim Jin-woo	Go Heung-shik	SBS, Monday-Friday 7:20 p.m.	March 6, 2013 – May 17, 2013	53	11.2%	6.6%	9.4%
Jang Bo-ri is Here!	왔다! 장보리	Oh Yeon-seo, Kim Ji-hoon, Lee Yoo-ri, Oh Chang-seok	Baek Ho-min	MBC, Saturday-Sunday 8:45 p.m.	April 5, 2014 – October 12, 2014	52	37.3%	9.6%	20.8%
My Daughter, Geum Sa-wol	내 딸 금사월	Baek Jin-hee, Yoon Hyun-min, Park Se-young, Do Sang-woo, Jeon In-hwa	Baek Ho-min, Lee Jae-jin	MBC, Saturday-Sunday 10:00 p.m.	September 5, 2015 – February 28, 2016	51	34.9%	14.7%	26.1%
Band of Sisters	언니는 살아있다	Jang Seo-hee, Kim Ju-hyeon, Oh Yoon-ah	Choi Young-hoon	SBS, Saturday 8:45 p.m.	April 15, 2017 - October 14, 2017	68	24.0%	6.1%	14.0%
The Last Empress	황후의 품격	Jang Na-ra, Shin Sung-rok, Choi Jin-hyuk, Shin Eun-kyung, Lee Elijah	Joo Dong-min	SBS, Wednesday-Thursday 10:00 p.m.	November 21, 2018 - February 21, 2019	52	17.9%	5.7%	12.2%
The Penthouse: War in Life	펜트하우스	Lee Ji-ah, Kim So-yeon, Eugene, Um Ki-joon, Yoon Jong-hoon, Shin Eun-kyung, Bong Tae-kyu, Park Eun-seok, Yoon Joo-hee	Joo Dong-min	SBS, Monday and Tuesday at 22:00	October 26, 2020 – January 5, 2021	21	28.8%	6.7%	16.4%
The Penthouse 2	펜트하우스 II	Lee Ji-ah, Kim So-yeon, Eugene, Um Ki-joon, Yoon Jong-hoon, Shin Eun-kyung, Bong Tae-kyu, Park Eun-seok, Yoon Joo-hee	Joo Dong-min	SBS, Friday and Saturday at 22:00	February 19, 2021 – April 2, 2021	13	29.2%	15.1%	22.2%
The Penthouse 3	펜트하우스 III	Lee Ji-ah, Kim So-yeon, Eugene, Um Ki-joon, Yoon Jong-hoon, Shin Eun-kyung, Bong Tae-kyu, Park Eun-seok, Yoon Joo-hee	Joo Dong-min	SBS, Friday at 22:00	June 4, 2021 – September 10, 2021	14	19.5%	14.4%	17.1%
The Escape of the Seven	7인의 탈출	Um Ki-joon, Hwang Jung-eum, Lee Joon, Lee Yu-bi, Shin Eun-kyung, Yoon Jong-hoon, Jo Yoon-hee, Jo Jae-yoon, Lee Deok-hwa	Joo Dong-min	SBS, Friday and Saturday at 22:00	September 15, 2023 – November 17, 2023	17	7.7%	5.2%	6.2%
The Resurrection of the Seven	7인의 부활	Um Ki-joon, Hwang Jung-eum, Lee Joon, Lee Yu-bi, Shin Eun-kyung, Yoon Jong-hoon, Jo Yoon-hee, Jo Jae-yoon, Lee Deok-hwa	Oh Joon-hyuk, Oh Song-hee	SBS, Friday and Saturday at 22:00	March 29, 2024 – May 18, 2024	16	4.4%	2.1%	3.2%
Spring of Youth	사계의 봄	Ha Yoo-joon, Park Ji-hu, Lee Seung-hyub, Seo Hye-won, Kim Seon-min	Kim Sung-yong	SBS, Wednesday at 22:40	May 6, 2025 – July 2, 2025	10	1.4%	0.7%	0.9%

=== As creator ===
Title	Korean title	Cast	Director	Broadcaster and timeslot	Broadcast period	Episodes	Highest rating	Lowest rating	Average rating
Pandora: Beneath the Paradise	판도라: 조작된 낙원	Lee Ji-ah, Lee Sang-yoon, Jang Hee-jin, Park Ki-woong, Bong Tae-gyu	Choi Young-hoon	tvN, Saturday and Sunday at 9:10 p.m.	March 11, 2023 – April 30, 2023	16	5.707%	2.880%	4.007%
Reborn Rookie	신입사원 강회장	Lee Jun-young, Son Hyun-joo, Lee Ju-myoung, Jeon Hye-jin, Jin Goo	Go Hye-jin	JTBC, Saturday at 10:40 p.m. and Sunday at 10:30 p.m.	May 30, 2026 – July 9, 2026	12	13.568%	3.695%	8.923%

== Awards ==
- 2014 MBC Drama Awards: Writer of the Year (Jang Bo-ri is Here!)
- 2021 SBS Drama Awards: Lifetime Achievement Award (The Penthouse: War in Life)
