= Oh Yeon-seo filmography =

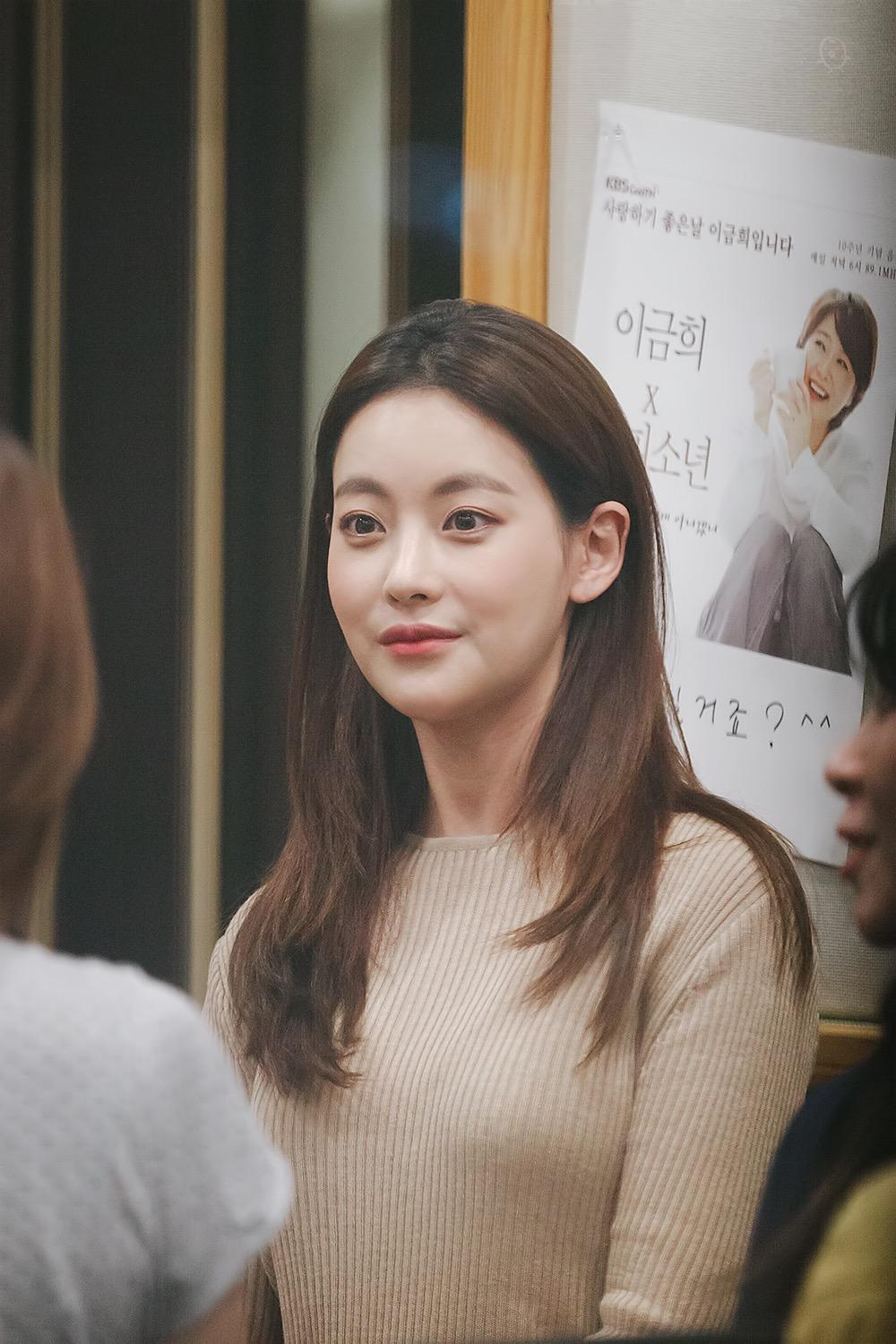
- Oh in 2017
- Film: 11
- Television series: 23
- Web series: 2
- Television show: 2
- Music videos: 12

Oh Yeon-seo (Korean: 오연서; June 22, 1987), is a South Korean actress, singer, and model. She was a member of the girl group Luv under SidusHQ.

== Film ==
| Year | Title | Role | Notes | Ref. |
|---|---|---|---|---|
| 2007 | Herb | Female teacher | | |
| 2007 | Someone Behind You | Jung Eun-kyung | | |
| 2007 | May I Cry? (울어도 좋습니까?) | | | |
| 2008 | Our School's E.T. | Soo-jin | | |
| 2009 | A Blood Pledge | Yoo-jin | | |
| 2010 | Happy Killers | Magazine model | | |
| 2011 | Green Days: Dinosaur and I | Han Soo-min | Voice | |
| 2012 | Just Friends | Song Eun-ji | | |
| 2016 | Run Off | Park Chae-gyeong | | |
| 2018 | Cheese in the Trap | Hong Seol | | |
| 2022 | Men of Plastic | Gyu-ok | | |

== Television series ==
| Year | Title | Role | Notes | Ref. |
|---|---|---|---|---|
| 2003 | Sharp | Lee Ye-rim | | |
| 2003 | Nonstop 4 | | Cameo (episode 33) | |
| 2006 | Stranger Than Paradise (천국보다 낯선) | | | |
| 2006 | Love and Hate (사랑도 미움도) | | | |
| 2007 | H.I.T | Son Seong-ok | | |
| 2007 | War of Money | Park Eun-ji | Cameo (episode 7) | |
| 2008 | Drama City – "LoveForSale.com" (사랑팔아 닷.컴) | Choi Hee-ju | | |
| 2008 | Returned Earthen Bowl (돌아온 뚝배기) | Seo Soo-jin | | |
| 2008 | The Great King, Sejong | Eori | | |
| 2010 | The Great Merchant | Lee Eun | | |
| 2010 | More Charming by the Day (볼수록 애교만점) | Red Shoes ghost | | |
| 2010 | Dong Yi | Queen Inwon | | |
| 2011 | Baby Faced Beauty | Lee So-jin | | |
| 2012 | My Husband Got a Family | Bang Mal-sook | | |
| 2012 | Here Comes Mr. Oh | Na Gong-joo | | |
| 2013 | Medical Top Team | Choi Ah-jin | | |
| 2014 | Jang Bo-ri Is Here! | Jang Bo-ri | | |
| 2015 | Shine or Go Crazy | Shin Yool / Gaebong | | |
| 2016 | Come Back Mister | Han Hong-nan | | |
| 2017 | My Sassy Girl | Princess Hye-myung | | |
| 2017–2018 | A Korean Odyssey | Jin Seon-mi | | |
| 2019–2020 | Love with Flaws | Joo Seo-yeon | | |
| 2022 | Café Minamdang | Han Jae-hui | | |
| 2024 | Player 2 | Joo Soo-min | | |
| 2025 | Nice to Not Meet You | Kwon Se-na | | |
| 2026 | Positively Yours | Jang Hee-won | | |

== Web series ==
| Year | Title | Role | Notes | Ref. |
|---|---|---|---|---|
| 2021 | Mad for Each Other | Lee Min-kyung | | |
| 2022 | Welcome to the Hyunam-dong Bookstore (어서 오세요, 휴남동 서점입니다) | Lee Young-joo | Audio drama | |

== Television shows ==
| Year | Title | Role | Notes | Ref. |
|---|---|---|---|---|
| 2012 | We Got Married Season 4 | Cast member | with Lee Joon | |
| 2016 | Boys24 | Host | | |
| 2020 | Get It Beauty 2020 (겟 잇 뷰티 2020) | Host | | |

== Music video appearances ==
| Year | Artist | Song title | Ref. |
|---|---|---|---|
| 2002 | LUV | "I Still Believe in You" | |
| 2002 | LUV | "Orange Girl" | |
| 2003 | Masta Wu feat. Seven | "White" | |
| 2006 | Big Mama | "Never Mind" | |
| 2006 | BGH4 | "Please" | |
| 2007 | Kim Jang-hoon | "Smile, Because I Am a Man" | |
| 2008 | Fly to the Sky | "Drunken Truth" | |
| 2008 | BigBang | "With U" | |
| 2009 | Im Chang-jung | "Long Time No See" | |
| 2009 | Yim Jae-beom | "Because of Love" | |
| 2010 | 2AM | "You Wouldn't Answer My Call" | |
| 2011 | Kim Hyung-jun | "Oh Ah!" | |
| 2012 | E2RE | "Deep Night Sad Song" | |

== Music drama ==
| Year | Title | Notes | Ref. |
|---|---|---|---|
| 2022 | Themselves | Three episodes will be produced as a large-scale musical | |
