= Spring of Youth (TV series) =

2025 South Korean TV series

- Promotional poster
- Hangul: 사계의 봄
- Lit.: Spring of the Four Seasons
- RR: Sagyeui bom
- MR: Sagyeŭi pom
- Genre: Teen; Romance
- Written by: Kim Min-cheol
- Directed by: Kim Sung-yong
- Starring: Ha Yoo-joon; Park Ji-hu; Lee Seung-hyub; Seo Hye-won; Kim Seon-min
- Country of origin: South Korea
- Original language: Korean
- No. of episodes: 10

Production
- Running time: 70 minutes
- Production companies: Studio S; FNC Story; Monster Union

Original release
- Network: SBS TV
- Release: May 6 – July 2, 2025

Spring of Youth (Korean: 사계의 봄) is a 2025 South Korean teen romance television series written by Kim Min-cheol, directed by Kim Sung-yong, and starring Ha Yoo-joon, Park Ji-hu, and Lee Seung-hyub. It aired on SBS TV from May 6, to July 2, 2025, every Wednesday at 22:40 (KST).

Drawing dismal average ratings of 0.9% despite airing on a terrestrial television network, Spring of Youth is notable for being belatedly revealed to have been written by Kim Soon-ok, who earned the reputation of being a "ratings queen" for controversial and highly provocative melodramas such as Temptation of Wife (2008–2009) and its spiritual successor Temptation of an Angel (2009), Jang Bo-ri is Here! (2014), My Daughter, Geum Sa-wol (2015–16), and The Penthouse: War in Life (2020–21).

== Plot ==
The series tells about a K-pop singer, Sa-gye, who is forced to attend a university campus. Forming a four-member co-ed band, he finds passionate love and music.

== Cast ==
=== Main ===
- Ha Yoo-joon as Sa-gye
  - Moon Woo-jin as young Sa-gye

A vocalist and guitarist of The Crown band.

- Park Ji-hu as Kim Bom
  - Park So-yi as young Bom
- Lee Seung-hyub as Seo Tae-yang
  - Nam Do-yoon as teen Tae-yang
  - Park Sung-Hoon as young Tae-yang
- Seo Hye-won as Bae Gyu-ri
- Kim Seon-min as Gong Jin-gu

=== Supporting ===
- Jo Han-chul as Jo Sang-heon

The president of Jo & Jo Company

- Han Yu-eun as Jo Ji-na

Sang-heon's daughter and is an artist manager

- Cha Chung-hwa as Kim Ja Yeong

Bom's aunt who take care of her after the death of her mother

- Kim Jong-tae as Seo Min-cheol

The hospital director and Tae-yang's father who had high expectations on him and considered music to be nonsense

- Han Jin-hee as Yoon Seung-su

Sa-gye's manager

- Kim Seo-ha as Kang Seok-hee

President Jo's secretary

=== Special appearance ===
- Lee Won-hee as girl in the airport (ep. 10)

== Production ==
=== Development ===
Director Kim Sung-yong, who previously co-directed My Dearest (2023), is in charge of directing, with Kim Min-cheol credited as the screenwriter. The series is produced by Studio S, FNC Story, and Monster Union.

A day after the final episode of Spring of Youth aired, Kim Min-cheol was belatedly revealed to be the pen name of Kim Soon-ok.

=== Casting ===
Lee Seung-hyub reportedly confirmed his appearance and began filming on November 4, 2024. On December 6, Hankook Ilbo reported that Park Ji-hu was starring as the female lead. On December 12, Jo Han-chul had confirmed his appearance. The next day, Seo Hye-won was reportedly confirmed her appearance. On December 23, Ha Yoo-joon, Park, and Lee were reportedly confirmed their casting.

== Release ==
The series will air once a week every Wednesday at 22:40 (KST). However, its first and second episodes will air respectively on Tuesday, May 6, and Wednesday, May 7, at 22:40 (KST).

== Ratings ==
Average TV viewership ratings (Nationwide)
Ep.	Original broadcast date	Average audience share (Nielsen Korea)
1	May 6, 2025	1.4% (38th)
2	May 7, 2025	0.7% (51st)
3	May 14, 2025	0.7% (50th)
4	May 21, 2025	0.8% (47th)
5	May 28, 2025	1.1% (33rd)
6	June 4, 2025	0.8% (47th)
7	June 11, 2025	0.8% (47th)
8	June 18, 2025	0.9% (36th)
9	June 25, 2025	0.9% (41st)
10	July 2, 2025	1.0% (35th)
Average		0.9%
In the table above, the blue numbers represent the lowest ratings and the red numbers represent the highest ratings.
