= Reborn Rookie =

2026 South Korean television series

- Promotional poster
- Hangul: 신입사원 강회장
- Lit.: The New Employee Chairman Kang
- RR: Sinip sawon Gang hoejang
- MR: Sinip sawŏn Kang hoejang
- Genre: Workplace; Fantasy; Revenge; Comedy
- Created by: Kim Soon-ok
- Based on: The New Employee Chairman Kang by San Kyung
- Written by: Hyun Ji-min
- Directed by: Go Hye-jin
- Starring: Lee Jun-young; Son Hyun-joo; Lee Ju-myoung; Jeon Hye-jin; Jin Goo
- Music by: Ha Geun-young
- Opening theme: "No Breaks" by Kang Seung-yoon
- Country of origin: South Korea
- Original language: Korean
- No. of episodes: 12

Production
- Production companies: SLL; Copus Korea

Original release
- Network: JTBC
- Release: May 30 – July 5, 2026

Reborn Rookie (Korean: 신입사원 강회장) is a 2026 South Korean workplace fantasy revenge comedy television series created by Kim Soon-ok, written by Hyun Ji-min, directed by Go Hye-jin, and starring Lee Jun-young, Son Hyun-joo, Lee Ju-myoung, Jeon Hye-jin, and Jin Goo. Based on the web novel The New Employee Chairman Kang by San Kyung, the series depicts the journey of Chairman Kang Yong-ho, who, after an accident, swaps souls with a young man named Hwang Jun-hyeon and becomes an employee at his own company. It aired on JTBC from May 30, to July 5, 2026, every Saturday at 22:40 (KST) and Sunday at 22:30 (KST). It is also available for streaming on TVING in South Korea and on Viu and Rakuten Viki in selected regions.

The series was a critical and commercial success. It was praised for its gripping storytelling, complex business scenarios, and passionate acting performances from the cast, with Lee Jun-young as the standout amongst critics and audiences for his double portrayal of both a young soccer player and an elderly conglomerate chairman. Commercially, the series finale recorded a nationwide rating of 13.6%, making it one of the highest-rated dramas in Korean cable television history.

== Synopsis ==
Hwang Jun-hyeon, a Choiseong FC soccer player, and Kang Yong-ho, the chairman of the Choiseong Group, cross paths when the chairman's son, Kang Jae-sung, viciously hits Jun-hyeon with the chairman's car while attempting to hide his and his twin sister Kang Jae-gyeong's embezzlement. Angered by the abrupt end of his soccer career and the ₩400 million penalty fee he is required to pay back, Jun-hyeon confronts Chairman Kang, but the two end up accidentally head-butting each other while falling down the stairs. After waking up in the hospital, Chairman Kang encounters a shocking revelation—his soul now inhabits the body of Jun-hyeon while Jun-hyeon's soul is in his original body, fast asleep in a coma. Coming to terms with this unexpected situation, Chairman Kang decides to make waves in the company and punish his children's wrongdoings by posing as genius new employee Hwang Jun-hyeon, receiving help from Kang Bang-geul, his youngest daughter who he kept hidden for years.

== Cast and characters ==
=== Main ===
- Lee Jun-young as Hwang Jun-hyeon / Kang Yong-ho (Chairman Kang)

After playing for FC Sunyang, Hwang Jun-hyeon transferred to Choiseong FC in the first division. He has expressed a goal of playing in the Premier League. One day after joining Choiseong FC, which Jun-hyeon considered the start of his career, he was injured in a hit-and-run accident. The incident ended his soccer career, and Choiseong FC terminated his contract. Key evidence disappeared, and the police investigation was described as incompetent. The reason for the accident was later revealed. The accident was captured on video call footage recorded by the caregiver at his grandmother's nursing home. The vehicle involved was a sports car belonging to the Choiseong Group Chairman Kang Yong-ho. After meeting with Chairman Kang, who had pushed him to the brink, Jun-hyeon's life completely changed. The soul of Chairman Kang inhabits Jun-hyeon's body, while his soul remains in a coma in Chairman Kang's body.

- Son Hyun-joo as Kang Yong-ho (Chairman Kang)

A businessman who, with his unwavering will, has elevated the Choiseong Group to the Top 10 in the South Korean business world. Believing that everything is governed by the logic of money, he earned the title of 'God of Business' while he forces his twin children to compete with him. However, an accident results in his soul being swapped with that of soccer player Hwang Jun-hyeon.

- Lee Ju-myoung as Kang Bang-geul / Casey Kang

The hidden child of a wealthy family whose very existence remains a secret. Fifteen years ago, she was forced by her family to study abroad and now acts as a troublemaker and lives like a vagrant. However, Bang-geul harbors a deep-seated ambition to prove herself to her family. Seeking to realize this, she secretly completes her studies abroad and joins the Choiseong Group as a new employee under a different identity.

- Jeon Hye-jin as Kang Jae-gyeong

Chairman Kang's twin daughter who is the president of Choiseong Chemical, a subsidiary of the Choiseong Group. She is a goal-oriented character who will stop at nothing when it comes to her passion. Growing up fighting with her twin brother, she possesses considerable fighting prowess. After her father, who pressured her by forcing her to compete with her older brother over every little thing, suffers an accident, she begins to show her true colors.

- Jin Goo as Kang Jae-sung

Chairman Kang's twin son who is the president of Choiseong Corporation, one of Choiseong Group's core subsidiaries. As the older of the twins, Jae-sung possesses a vast ambition, but surprisingly little ability. Overwhelmed by his father and overshadowed by his younger sister, he becomes a petty person, determined to win against his sister and seize control of the Choiseong Group.

=== Supporting ===
==== People of Choiseong Group ====
- Yoon Yoo-sun as Cho Seon-hee

Chairman Kang's second wife and Bang-geul's biological mother.

- Lee Sung-wook as Park Bong-gi

The manager of Materials Team 2 at Choiseong Trading. Formerly a star in the company's auditing department, he was demoted after exposing corrupt practices within the Choiseong family. He allies with interns Hwang Jun-hyeon and Kang Bang-geul after they join his department, which leads him to reclaiming his secret talents.

- Kim Jong-tae as Lee Sang-jae

The executive director of the Choiseong Group and Chairman Kang's devoted right-hand man for many years. He overlooks those who want to seize control of the Choiseong Group after the accident occurs.

- Kwon Hae-sung as Min Seok-do

Jae-gyeong's husband, who is a professor of neurosurgery at Hangang University Hospital. The two married shortly after meeting at a hospital sponsorship event, and Seok-do is wholeheartedly persistent on supporting his wife to take over the Choiseong Group. He stands by his wife's side no matter what happens, proving his unwavering loyalty to her.

- Jung Min-joon as Min Il-jun

Jae-gyeong's son.

- Kim Seo-ha as Kang Yi-jun

Jae-sung's son.

==== Others ====
- Jung Jae-sung as Na Byeong-mo

Chairman of the Taeha Group and Eun-se's father. He is a rival to the Choiseong Group.

- Lee Seo-an as Na Eun-se

Jae-sung's wife through an arranged marriage, she is the eldest daughter-in-law of the Choiseong family and the heiress of the Taeha Group. She wants to make her husband the sole successor of the Choiseong Group, using her strategic skills to ensure he doesn't lose the succession war to his twin sister Jae-gyeong.

- Byun Jung-hee as Heo Ok-soon

Jun-hyeon's grandmother.

- Shim Woo-sung as Mayor Jang Young-guk, who is facing re-election.

=== Special appearances ===
- Gong Min-jeung as Gangwon-do governor's aide (Ep. 4)
- Ryujin as herself (Ep. 12)

== Production ==
=== Development ===
Screenwriter Kim Soon-ok, who wrote The Last Empress (2018–2019) and The Penthouse: War in Life (2020–2021) is the creator of the series, while writer Hyun Ji-min, who penned Pandora: Beneath the Paradise (2023) is credited as the screenwriter. Directed by Go Hye-jin / Christine Ko and produced by SLL and Copus Korea, the series is based on the web novel The New Employee Chairman Kang by San Kyung, the creator of Reborn Rich's source web novel, which also aired on JTBC.

=== Casting ===
Lee Jun-young and Jung Chae-yeon were reportedly considering in August 2025. The next month, Lee Jun-young was confirmed to appear, Lee Ju-myoung entered talks for a role, and Son Hyun-joo was cast. By November 2025, the lead cast was confirmed to include Lee Jun-young, Son Hyun-joo, Lee Ju-myoung, Jeon Hye-jin, and Jin Goo.

=== Filming ===
Production was confirmed on September 10, 2025 after JTBC announced that it would air in 2026. Principal photography began in November 2025 and concluded in April 2026.

== Release ==
Reborn Rookie was reportedly scheduled to premiere on JTBC in 2026. By April 2026, the premiere date was confirmed to be on May 30, 2026, airing every Saturday at 22:40 (KST) and Sunday at 22:30 (KST). It is also available for streaming on TVING in South Korea and Viu and Rakuten Viki in selected regions.

== Original soundtrack ==
=== Part 1 ===
Released on May 30, 2026
No.	Title	Lyrics	Music	Artist	Length
1.	"No Breaks" (직진)	Joombas	Jaeseong	Kang Seung-yoon (Winner)	3:10
2.	"No Breaks" (직진; Inst.)		Jaeseong		3:10
Total length:					6:20

=== Part 2 ===
Released on June 7, 2026
No.	Title	Lyrics	Music	Artist	Length
1.	"Pay Me in Noise"	Jaeseong	Jaeseong	The Vane	4:22
2.	"Pay Me in Noise" (Inst.)		Jaeseong		4:22
Total length:					8:44

=== Part 3 ===
Released on June 14, 2026
No.	Title	Lyrics	Music	Artist	Length
1.	"I'm Runnin'"	Nine; Junji	Nine; Junji; George Fickle	Close Your Eyes	2:47
2.	"I'm Runnin'" (Inst.)		Nine; Junji; George Fickle		2:47
Total length:					5:34

=== Compilation album ===
Reborn Rookie (Original Soundtrack)

Soundtrack album by Various Artists
- Released: July 6, 2026
- Genre: Soundtrack
- Languages: Korean; English
- Label: SLL

A compilation soundtrack album was released on July 6, 2026. The album contains 32 tracks, consisting of the three previously released vocal tracks and 29 original score tracks led by music director Ha Geun-young and featuring Cho Eun-jung, Cho Hye-ran, Lee Dong-eun, Lee Ga-young, and Very Berry.

Track Listing

No.	Title	Artist	Length
1.	"No Breaks" (직진)	Kang Seung-yoon	3:10
2.	"Pay Me In Noise"	The Vane	4:22
3.	"I'm Runnin'"	Close Your Eyes	2:47
4.	"Legacy of Choi Sung"	Ha Geun-young and Lee Ga-young	2:32
5.	"Rich Man's Big Issue"	Ha Geun-young and Very Berry	2:39
6.	"Inescapable Darkness"	Ha Geun-young and Cho Eun-jung	2:56
7.	"Shadow of JaeGyeong"	Ha Geun-young and Cho Eun-jung	3:05
8.	"Turbulent Heart"	Ha Geun-young and Cho Hye-ran	3:46
9.	"Blue Hour"	Ha Geun-young and Lee Dong-eun	2:08
10.	"Crash"	Ha Geun-young and Lee Dong-eun	2:30
11.	"Inner Pressure"	Ha Geun-young and Lee Ga-young	2:36
12.	"Lucifer Speaks"	Ha Geun-young and Very Berry	2:14
13.	"Look For Truth"	Ha Geun-young and Cho Eun-jung	3:24
14.	"Counterplay"	Ha Geun-young and Lee Ga-young	3:13
15.	"Rich Man's Big Issue 2"	Ha Geun-young and Very Berry	1:54
16.	"Hidden Operation"	Ha Geun-young and Lee Ga-young	3:05
17.	"Blackout"	Ha Geun-young and Lee Dong-eun	2:43
18.	"Fake Ghost"	Ha Geun-young and Very Berry	1:37
19.	"Explosion"	Ha Geun-young and Cho Hye-ran	2:58
20.	"Wild Card"	Ha Geun-young and Lee Dong-eun	2:23
21.	"Perfect Mess"	Ha Geun-young and Lee Ga-young	2:17
22.	"Mission Accomplished"	Ha Geun-young and Cho Hye-ran	2:10
23.	"Dark Comic"	Ha Geun-young and Cho Eun-jung	2:27
24.	"Sneaky Mission"	Ha Geun-young and Lee Ga-young	1:58
25.	"Keep It Low"	Ha Geun-young and Lee Dong-eun	1:56
26.	"Macho Comic"	Ha Geun-young and Cho Eun-jung	3:50
27.	"Behind the Name"	Ha Geun-young and Lee Ga-young	3:11
28.	"Tomboy"	Ha Geun-young and Lee Dong-eun	1:58
29.	"I'm Not Crying"	Ha Geun-young and Lee Dong-eun	2:04
30.	"Lost Time, Facing Today"	Ha Geun-young and Cho Hye-ran	3:39
31.	"Lost Time, Facing Today - Jazz ver."	Ha Geun-young and Cho Hye-ran	3:50
32.	"Level 1 Man"	Ha Geun-young and Very Berry	3:15
Total length:			88:37

== Reception ==
=== Critical response ===
Reborn Rookie received generally positive reviews from critics, who praised the quick yet detailed plot progression along with the stellar acting performances from the cast. The Korea Times described the series as a perfect mix between a "corporate succession struggle" and a "powerful-hero formula", highlighting its appeal. Ankita Chandra of t2ONLINE, the culture and lifestyle column for The Telegraph India, rated the series 3.5 out of 5 stars, citing the body-swap plot and the "balance of laughter and emotion" as one of the series' strong suits. Additionally, the cast was applauded for their work, with Lee Jun-young recognized as the main focal point of the series. Chandra acknowledged Lee as a compelling lead who "convincingly portray[ed] both Jun-hyeon and Yong-ho". Korean pop culture critic Kim Heon-sik commented that Lee's role was a "rediscovery" of his talent, and he showed "charisma and command" and a "stable performance" in a genre that could have been "difficult to handle" otherwise. Jeon Hye-jin was also noted for her presence in the series as a villain, with critic Kim stating that she embodied her character well.

=== Viewership ===
Reborn Rookie premiered on May 30, 2026, with a nationwide viewership rating of 3.7% and a metropolitan area viewership rating of 3.8%. By the second episode, the ratings increased to 5.2% both nationwide and in the Seoul metropolitan area, showing a steep upwards trend and making the series emerge as a "weekend dark horse drama" due to its popularity and rapid momentum. During the subsequent weeks, positive word-of-mouth on the engaging story, the fast pacing, and the actors' performances, particularly Lee Jun-young's portrayal of a dual role, helped boost the viewership ratings to double digits for the first time on episode 8, averaging 11.0% both nationwide and in Seoul. The remainder of the series' run continued to pull in double digit ratings, and the final episode, broadcast on July 5, recorded the series' highest ratings of 13.6% nationwide and 13.5% in Seoul, along with the peak minute soaring to 14.8% nationwide and 5.2% in the 20-49 target demographic. The series is currently the ninth highest-rated JTBC drama and is in the top 30 for highest-rated cable dramas.

On streaming, Reborn Rookie ranked first place on Viu in Indonesia, Thailand, and Malaysia on the week of June 1–7, 2026, appearing in the top 10 of six countries in total across Asia. The series also simultaneously reached first place on TVING in South Korea, Rakuten Viki in North America, Lemino in Japan, and friDay Video in Taiwan during its run. During the week of June 29 to July 5, 2026, which included the finale, the series ranked first on Viu in Indonesia, Thailand, Malaysia, and Hong Kong, second in Singapore, and third in the Philippines.

Reborn Rookie : South Korea viewers per episode (millions)

Season	Episode number												Average
Season	1	2	3	4	5	6	7	8	9	10	11	12	Average
1	0.893	1.245	1.609	1.962	1.950	2.296	2.124	2.551	2.554	2.716	2.616	3.344	2.155

Source: Audience measurement performed nationwide by Nielsen Korea.

Average TV viewership ratings
Ep.	Original broadcast date	Average audience share (Nielsen Korea)	
Ep.	Original broadcast date	Nationwide	Seoul
1	May 30, 2026	3.695% (1st)	3.764% (1st)
2	May 31, 2026	5.156% (1st)	5.247% (1st)
3	June 6, 2026	6.726% (1st)	6.611% (1st)
4	June 7, 2026	8.218% (1st)	8.100% (1st)
5	June 13, 2026	8.088% (1st)	8.025% (1st)
6	June 14, 2026	9.524% (1st)	10.166% (1st)
7	June 20, 2026	8.830% (1st)	8.853% (1st)
8	June 21, 2026	11.005% (1st)	10.891% (1st)
9	June 27, 2026	10.401% (1st)	10.645% (1st)
10	June 28, 2026	11.062% (1st)	11.150% (1st)
11	July 4, 2026	10.808% (1st)	10.660% (1st)
12	July 5, 2026	13.568% (1st)	13.498% (1st)
Average		8.923%	8.968%
In the table above, the blue numbers represent the lowest ratings and the red numbers represent the highest ratings.; This drama airs on a cable channel/pay TV which normally has a relatively smaller audience compared to free-to-air TV/public broadcasters (KBS, SBS, MBC, and EBS).

== Accolades ==
=== Awards and nominations ===
Name of the award ceremony, year presented, category, nominee of the award, and the result of the nomination
Award ceremony	Year	Category	Nominee	Result	Ref.
Asian Television Awards	2026	Best Drama Series	Reborn Rookie	Nominated	
Fundex Awards	2026	Best of TV Drama	Reborn Rookie	Pending	
Korea Drama Awards	2026	Best Drama	Reborn Rookie	Nominated	
Korea Drama Awards	2026	Scene Stealer Award	Kim Jong-tae	Won	

=== Listicles ===
Name of publisher, year listed, name of listicle, and placement
Publisher	Year	Listicle	Placement	Ref.
Joy News 24	2026	Best Dramas of 2026	10th (Note: mentioned together with Made in Korea and The Affair Was Just the Beginning)	
