= Seo Hye-won =

South Korean actress (born 1993)

- Born: November 4, 1993 (age 32); Gyeryong, South Korea
- Other name: Seo Hee-won
- Education: Yong In University – Bachelor of Theater Studies
- Occupation: Actress
- Years active: 2018–present
- Agent: D.P. Story

Korean name
- Hangul: 서혜원
- Hanja: 徐慧原
- RR: Seo Hyewon
- MR: Sŏ Hyewŏn

Seo Hye-won (Korean: 서혜원; born November 4, 1993) is a South Korean actress. She is notable for her roles in Cheongdam-dong Alice (2012–2013), Welcome 2 Life (2019), True Beauty (2020–2021), Nevertheless (2021), Business Proposal (2022), and Alchemy of Souls (2022–2023).

== Filmography ==
=== Film ===
Year	Title	Role	Ref.
2021	Whispering Corridors 6: The Humming	Mi-sook	
2023	Loan Boy	Hui-won	
2024	Again 1997	Dong-sook	

=== Television series ===
Year	Title	Role	Notes	Ref.
2018–2019	My Strange Hero	Kim Bo-kyung		
2019	Welcome 2 Life	Ring		
2020	Team Bulldog: Off-Duty Investigation	Cho So-yoo		
2020–2021	True Beauty	Park Ji-hee		
2021	Nevertheless	Jang Se-young		
2021	Jirisan	Hong Young-mi		
2021–2022	Let Me Be Your Knight	Jung Ba-reun		
2022	Business Proposal	Jo Yoo-jung		
2022	Bloody Heart	Hyang-yi		
2022	Alchemy of Souls	So-yi		
2022	Extraordinary Attorney Woo	Choi Da-hae	Cameo (episode 11)	
2022	May I Help You?	Yoo So-ra		
2023	Sound Candy	Yang Ka-hee		
2024	Queen of Divorce	Kang Bom		
2024	Lovely Runner	Lee Hyun-joo		
2025	Love Scout	Oh Kyung-hwa		
2025	When Life Gives You Tangerines	Yang Gyeong-ok		
2025	Kick Kick Kick Kick	Seo Hye-won		
2025	Spring of Youth	Bae Gyu-ri		
2025–2026	Pro Bono	Yoo Nan-hee		

=== Web series ===
Year	Title	Role	Ref.
2018	Just One Bite	Im Soo-ji	
2018	Just One Bite: Pilot	Im Soo-ji	
2018	Replaylist	Im Soo-ji	
2019	Re-Feel	Im Soo-ji	
2019	Just One Bite 2	Im Soo-ji	
2021	Mad for Each Other	Survey woman	
2022	The Fabulous	Xena	
2023	Our D-Day	Hye-won	
