= Kim Ji-young (actress, born 2005) =

South Korean actress (born 2005)

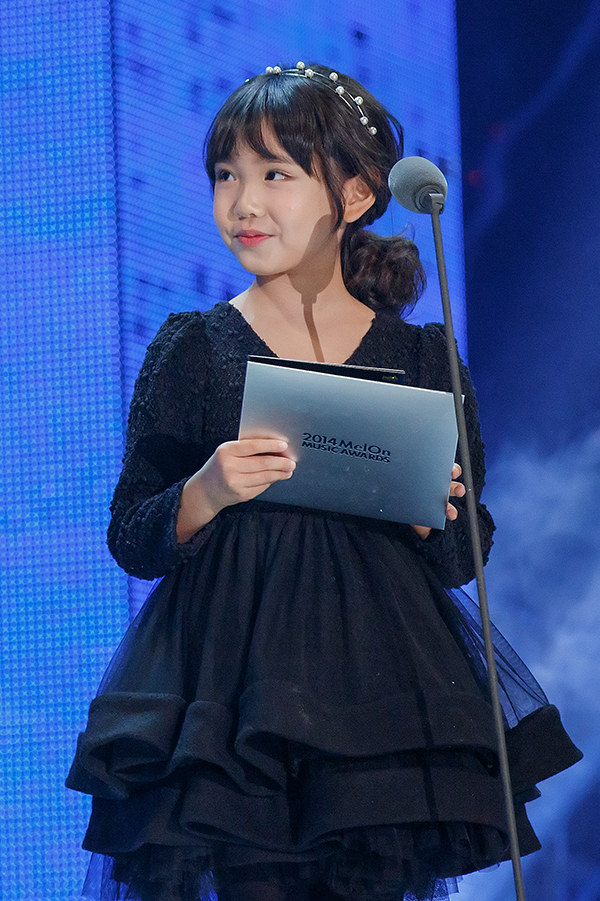
- Kim in 2014
- Born: July 8, 2005 (age 21); Cheonan, South Korea
- Education: School of Performing Arts Seoul (dropped out)
- Occupation: Actress
- Years active: 2011–present

Korean name
- Hangul: 김지영
- Hanja: 金智怜
- RR: Gim Jiyeong
- MR: Kim Chiyŏng

Kim Ji-young (Korean: 김지영; born July 8, 2005) is a South Korean actress who began her career as a child actress, notably in the 2014 television drama Jang Bo-ri is Here!.

== Filmography ==
=== Film ===
| Year | Title | Role |
|---|---|---|
| 2011 | Sector 7 | young Cha Hae-joon |
| 2011 | Silenced | Sol-yi |
| 2011 | A Reason to Live | young Da-hye |
| 2012 | Runway Cop | young Ko Young-jae |
| 2012 | Touch | Park Joo-mi |
| 2013 | Happiness for Sale | Kindergarten student |
| 2013 | Killer Toon | young Jo Seo-hyun |
| 2013 | Mr. Go | young Weiwei |
| 2013 | Hide and Seek | Pyeong-hwa |
| 2013 | My Dear Girl, Jin-young | 6-year-old Kim Jin-young |

=== Television series ===
| Year | Title | Role |
|---|---|---|
| 2011 | Special Affairs Team TEN | Min Chae-won |
| 2011 | I'm Alive | Han Hye-seon |
| 2012 | History of a Salaryman | Ji-won, Han Shin's daughter |
| 2012 | Take Care of Us, Captain | young Hong Mi-joo |
| 2012 | Welcome Rain to My Life | Lee Ha-ra |
| 2012 | Vampire Prosecutor 2 | Lee Ji-ae |
| 2013 | Case Number 113 | young Seung-joo |
| 2013 | KBS Drama Special: "Mother's Island" | Lee Sa-rang |
| 2013 | Thrice Married Woman | Jung Seul-ki |
| 2014 | Jang Bo-ri Is Here! | Do Bi-dan |
| 2014 | Doctor Stranger | Jeong-min |
| 2014 | You're All Surrounded | Lee Hyun-mi (guest, episode 6) |
| 2014 | Temptation | Kang Yoon-ah |
| 2014 | Punch | Park Ye-rin |
| 2015 | KBS Drama Special: "Live Shock" | Eun-Byeol |
| 2015 | My Daughter, Geum Sa-wol | Im Mi-rang |
| 2016 | Love in the Moonlight | young Hong Ra-on |
| 2016 | KBS Drama Special: "Pinocchio's Nose" | young Yoon Da-jung |
| 2016 | One More Time | Angel Demon |
| 2017 | Man in the Kitchen | Go Eun-byul |
| 2018 | Devilish Charm | Ju Sa-rang |
| 2018 | Sweet Revenge 2 | Oh Sa-na |
| 2019 | Liver or Die | Lee Joong-yi |
| 2020 | Itaewon Class | young Oh Soo-ah |
| 2020 | Graceful Friends | Chun Soo-ah |
| 2021 | Racket Boys | Ah Young Cameo (Episode 16) |
| 2021 | Melancholia | Kim Ji-na |
| 2022 | Never Give Up | Jo An-na |

== Awards and nominations ==
| Year | Award | Category | Nominated work | Result |
|---|---|---|---|---|
| 2014 | 7th Korea Drama Awards | Best Young Actress | Jang Bo-ri is Here! | Won |
| 2014 | 3rd APAN Star Awards | Best Young Actress | Jang Bo-ri is Here! | Won |
| 2014 | MBC Drama Awards | Best Young Actress | Jang Bo-ri is Here! | Won |
