= 2014 MBC Drama Awards =

33rd edition of award ceremony

- Date: December 30, 2014
- Site: MBC HQ, Sangamdong, Seoul
- Hosted by: Shin Dong-yup; Choi Soo-young

Highlights
- Best Drama Serial: Jang Bo-ri Is Here!
- Grand Prize (Daesang): Lee Yoo-ri

Television coverage
- Network: MBC

The 2014 MBC Drama Awards (Korean: MBC 연기대상) is a ceremony honoring the outstanding achievement in television on the Munhwa Broadcasting Corporation (MBC) network for the year of 2014. It was held on December 30, 2014 and hosted by Shin Dong-yup and Girls' Generation's Choi Soo-young.

== Nominations and winners ==
- Winners denoted in **bold**
- The Grand Prize (Daesang) has been determined through viewer's votes since 2014, and not by a professional set of judges.

Grand Prize (Daesang)	Drama of the Year
**Lee Yoo-ri** – **Jang Bo-ri Is Here!**; Oh Yeon-seo – Jang Bo-ri Is Here!; Song Yun-ah – Mama	**Jang Bo-ri Is Here!**
Top Excellence Award, Actor in a Miniseries	Top Excellence Award, Actress in a Miniseries
**Jang Hyuk** – **You Are My Destiny**; Kam Woo-sung – My Spring Days; Kim Myung-min – A New Leaf; Shin Ha-kyun – Mr. Back	**Jang Na-ra** – **You Are My Destiny**, **Mr. Back**; Lee Min-jung – Cunning Single Lady; Lee Yeon-hee – Miss Korea
Top Excellence Award, Actor in a Special Project Drama	Top Excellence Award, Actress in a Special Project Drama
**Jung Il-woo** – **Diary of a Night Watchman**; Jung Joon-ho – Mama; Lee Beom-soo – Triangle; Lee Dong-wook – Hotel King	**Song Yun-ah** – **Mama**; Han Ji-hye – 4 Legendary Witches; Moon Jeong-hee – Mama
Top Excellence Award, Actor in a Serial Drama	Top Excellence Award, Actress in a Serial Drama
**Kim Ji-hoon** – **Jang Bo-ri Is Here!**; Kim Ho-jin – Everybody Say Kimchi; Park Yoon-jae – Shining Romance	**Oh Yeon-seo** – **Jang Bo-ri Is Here!**; Jeong Yu-mi – Mother's Garden; Lee Jin – Shining Romance; Lee Yoo-ri – Jang Bo-ri Is Here!
Excellence Award, Actor in a Miniseries	Excellence Award, Actress in a Miniseries
**Kim Sang-joong** – **A New Leaf**; Joo Sang-wook – Cunning Single Lady; Lee Sun-kyun – Miss Korea	**Choi Soo-young** – **My Spring Days**; Jang Shin-young – My Spring Days; Park Min-young – A New Leaf; Park Ye-jin – Mr. Back
Excellence Award, Actor in a Special Project Drama	Excellence Award, Actress in a Special Project Drama
**Choi Jin-hyuk** – **Pride and Prejudice**; Ha Seok-jin – 4 Legendary Witches; Jung Yun-ho – Diary of a Night Watchman; Kim Jae-joong – Triangle	**Baek Jin-hee** – **Pride and Prejudice**, **Triangle**; Lee Da-hae – Hotel King; Oh Hyun-kyung – 4 Legendary Witches
Excellence Award, Actor in a Serial Drama	Excellence Award, Actress in a Serial Drama
**Lee Jang-woo** – **Rosy Lovers**; Ki Tae-young- Make Your Wish; Oh Chang-seok – Jang Bo-ri Is Here!	**Kim Ji-young** – **Everybody Say Kimchi**; Jo An – Shining Romance; Oh Ji-eun- Make Your Wish; Park Si-eun – Hold My Hand
Golden Acting Award, Actor	Golden Acting Award, Actress
**Ahn Nae-sang** – **Jang Bo-ri Is Here!**; **Choi Min-soo** – **Pride and Prejudice**; Jeon Guk-hwan – Empress Ki, Mr. Back; Lee Deok-hwa – Hotel King; Park Sang-won – Rosy Lovers	**Kim Hye-ok** – **Jang Bo-ri Is Here!**; **Lee Mi-sook** – **Miss Korea, Shining Romance, Rosy Lovers**; Go Doo-shim – 4 Legendary Witches; Jung Hye-sun – 4 Legendary Witches; Song Ok-sook – You Are My Destiny
Best New Actor	Best New Actress
**Choi Tae-joon** – **Mother's Garden**; **Yim Si-wan** – **Triangle**; Hong Jong-hyun – Mama; Lee Joon – Mr. Back; Seo Kang-joon – Cunning Single Lady	**Han Sunhwa** – **Rosy Lovers**; **Ko Sung-hee** – **Miss Korea, Diary of a Night Watchman**; Choi Soo-young – My Spring Days; Wang Ji-won – You Are My Destiny; Seo Yea-ji – Diary of a Night Watchman
Best Young Actor	Best Young Actress
**Yoon Chan-young** – **Mama**	**Kim Ji-young** – **Jang Bo-ri Is Here!**
Best Actor/Actress in a Drama Short	PD Award
**Byun Hee-bong** – **Drama Festival "Lump in My Life"**; Heo Jung-do – Drama Festival "Gabon"; Jang Hyuk – Drama Festival "Old Farewell"; Kim Seul-gi – Drama Festival "A Resentful Woman's Diary"; Lee Jong-hyuk – Drama Festival "Turning Point"	**Lee Yoo-ri** – **Jang Bo-ri Is Here!**
Popularity Award, Actor	Popularity Award, Actress
**Shin Ha-kyun** – **Mr. Back**; Choi Jin-hyuk – Pride and Prejudice, You Are My Destiny; Jang Hyuk – You Are My Destiny; Joo Sang-wook – Cunning Single Lady; Jung Il-woo – Diary of a Night Watchman; Kam Woo-sung – My Spring Days; Lee Dong-wook – Hotel King; Lee Jang-woo – Rosy Lovers; Lee Sun-kyun – Miss Korea	**Jang Na-ra** – **You Are My Destiny**, **Mr. Back**; Baek Jin-hee – Pride and Prejudice, Triangle; Choi Soo-young – My Spring Days; Han Ji-hye – 4 Legendary Witches; Han Sunhwa – Rosy Lovers; Lee Yeon-hee – Miss Korea; Lee Yoo-ri – Jang Bo-ri Is Here!; Oh Yeon-seo – Jang Bo-ri Is Here!; Song Yun-ah – Mama
Best Couple Award	Writer of the Year
**Jang Hyuk** and **Jang Na-ra** – **You Are My Destiny**; Choi Jin-hyuk and Baek Jin-hee – Pride and Prejudice; Ha Seok-jin and Han Ji-hye – 4 Legendary Witches; Jung Il-woo and Ko Sung-hee – Diary of a Night Watchman; Kam Woo-sung and Choi Soo-young – My Spring Days; Kim Ji-hoon and Oh Yeon-seo – Jang Bo-ri Is Here!; Lee Dong-wook and Lee Da-hae – Hotel King; Lee Jang-woo and Han Sunhwa – Rosy Lovers; Oh Chang-seok and Lee Yoo-ri – Jang Bo-ri Is Here!; Shin Ha-kyun and Jang Na-ra – Mr. Back	**Kim Soon-ok** – **Jang Bo-ri Is Here!**; **Yoo Yoon-kyung** – **Mama**
Achievement Award
**Kim Ja-ok**
