= Yoon Joo-hee =

South Korean actress (born 1985)

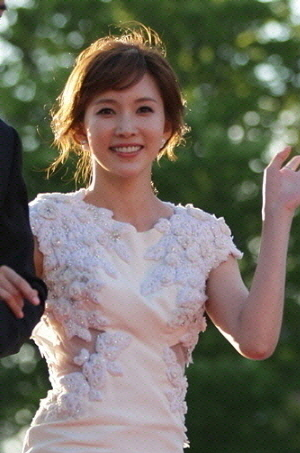
- Yoon in 2015
- Born: February 21, 1985 (age 41); Daejeon, South Korea
- Education: Kongju Communication Arts College
- Occupation: Actress
- Years active: 2004–present
- Agent: Pi Entertainment

Korean name
- Hangul: 윤주희
- RR: Yun Juhui
- MR: Yun Chuhŭi

Yoon Joo-hee (Korean: 윤주희; born February 21, 1985) is a South Korean actress. She is best known for starring in the multi-season medical/crime procedural cable TV series Quiz of God.

== Filmography ==
=== Film ===
Year	Title	Role	Ref.
2004	Someone Special	Flight attendant	
2007	Never Forever	Jihah's girlfriend	
2008	April Again	Ji-soo	
2008	Life Is Cool	Joo-hee	
2009	The Sword with No Name	Kan-taek woman	
2010	The 8 Sentiments	Eun-joo	
2011	Marrying the Mafia 4: Unstoppable Family	Airline employee	
2014	Tattooist	Jo Soo-na	
2022	It's Alright	TVING Shorts Film	

=== Television series ===
Year	Title	Role	Notes	Ref.
2007	H.I.T	Nurse		
2007	Likeable or Not	Seo Joo-kyung		
2007	First Wives' Club	Bang Hae-ja		
2008	Aquarius	Lee Shin-young		
2008	Hwansang Gidam	Yoon-mi		
2008	Hometown of Legends: "Gisaeng House Ghost Story"	So-wol		
2009	Creating Destiny	Jung Seo-yeon		
2009	Three Brothers	Lee Tae-baek		
2010	The Slave Hunters	Jakeun Jumo ("young hostess")		
2010	Would We Love?	Yoo-jin		
2010	KBS Drama Special: "Our Slightly Risque Relationship"			
2010	I Am Legend	Jeon Jae-hee		
2010	Quiz of God 1	Kang Kyung-hee		
2010	Sunday Drama Theater: "Jo Eun-ji's Family"	Hee-sun		
2011	Quiz of God 2	Kang Kyung-hee		
2011	Ojakgyo Family	Sung Ye-jin		
2011	Bolder by the Day	Lee Eun-byul		
2012	Dr. Jin	Gye-hyang	Guest	
2012	Quiz of God 3	Kang Kyung-hee	Cameo (Episode 12)	
2012	The Great Seer	Lady Kang, wife of Yi Seong-gye		
2013	Iris II: New Generation	Lee Soo-jin		
2013	Wonderful Mama	Kim Nan-hee		
2013	One Warm Word	Yoon Sun-ah		
2014	Love in Memory 2: Dad's Notes	Ji-eun	Mobile Drama	
2014	Quiz of God 4	Kang Kyung-hee		
2014	Angel Eyes	Han Yoo-ri	Cameo	
2014	Run, Jang-mi	Kang Min-joo		
2015	D-Day	Park Ji-na		
2016	Flowers of the Prison	Lee So-jeong		
2017	Whisper	Hwang Bo-yeon		
2018	Risky Romance	Joo Se-ra		
2018	Return	Park Jin-joo		
2018	Quiz of God 5: Reboot	Kang Kyung-hee		
2019	The Fiery Priest	Bae Hee-jung		
2019	I Wanna Hear Your Song	Yoon Mi-rae		
2020–2021	The Penthouse: War in Life	Go Sang-ah	Season 1–3	
2023	The Real Has Come!	Yeom Su-jeong		

=== Music video appearances ===
Year	Title	Artist
2006	"I'm in Tears"	Bubble Sisters
2006	"Eraser"	Soul Star
2007	"Three People"	Lee Ki-chan
2009	"My Ugly Love"	Voice One
2010	"Crazy Day"	Chae Dong-ha
2011	"Waiting"	QJ

== Awards and nominations ==
Name of the award ceremony, year presented, category, nominee of the award, and the result of the nomination
Award ceremony	Year	Category	Nominee / Work	Result	Ref.
SBS Drama Awards	2020	Best Supporting Actress	The Penthouse: War in Life	Nominated	
SBS Drama Awards	2021	Excellence Award for an Actress in a Mini-Series Genre/Fantasy Drama	The Penthouse: War in Life 2 and 3	Nominated	
