= Park Eun-seok =

South Korean actor

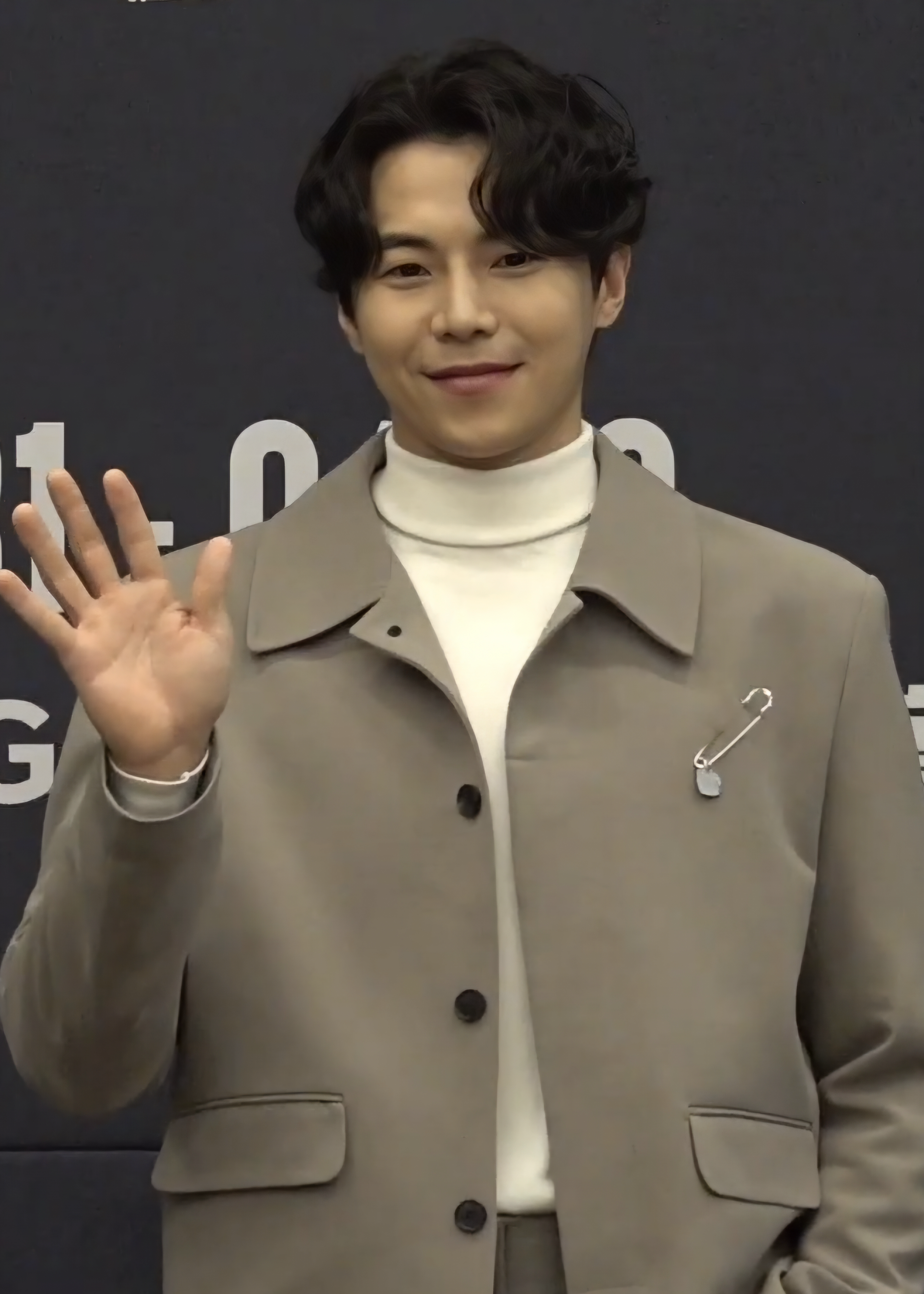
- Park in February 2023
- Born: Park Eun-seok; February 10, 1984 (age 42); Seoul, South Korea
- Other name: Danny Park
- Education: Seoul Institute of the Arts (Department of Broadcasting & Entertainment)
- Occupation: Actor
- Years active: 2010–present
- Agent: Hunus Entertainment

Korean name
- Hangul: 박은석
- Hanja: 朴殷碩
- RR: Bak Eunseok
- MR: Pak Ŭnsŏk

Park Eun-seok (Korean: 박은석; born February 10, 1984), or Danny Park, is a South Korean actor. He is best known for his work in theatre and is also known for his breakout performance in the 2020 television drama The Penthouse: War in Life.

== Early life ==
Born in South Korea, Park emigrated to the US with his family at the age of 7, settling in Long Island, Huntington, New York. He returned to Korea in 2005 at the age of 21 to pursue an acting career. Being a permanent resident of the United States at the time, Park voluntarily served in the South Korean military in order to improve his Korean. He later gave up his permanent resident status after being discharged from the military.

== Filmography ==
=== Film ===
Year	Title	Role	Ref.
2015	12 Deep Red Nights: Chapter 1	Kwang-hyeon	

=== Television series ===
Year	Title	Role	Notes	Ref.
2010	Athena: Goddess of War	Hyeon-soo		
2012	Take Care of Us, Captain	Park Eun-seok		
2015	Webtoon Hero Toondra Show	Joo Do-jin		
2015	Noble, My Love	Woo Sang-hyeon		
2015	The Village: Achiara's Secret	Nam Gun-woo		
2016	One More Happy Ending	Bang Dong-bae		
2016	The Gentlemen of Wolgyesu Tailor Shop	Min Hyo-sang		
2017	The Rebel	Joo Soo-hak		
2018	Partners for Justice	Kang-hyun		
2018	Voice	Go David		
2019	Doctor Prisoner	Lee Jae-hwan		
2019	Birthday Letter	Moo-jin		
2019	KBS Drama Special: Clean and Polish	Do Tae-rang		
2019	Partners for Justice	Kang-hyun		
2019	Leverage	Min Young-min		
2020	The Penthouse: War in Life	Gu Ho-dong / Logan Lee / Alex Lee		
2021	Moonshine	Seong-hyeon	Cameo appearance	
2024	Dare to Love Me	Lee Joon-ho		

=== Television shows ===
Year	Title	Role	Notes	Ref.
2021	My Little Old Boy	Special Host	Episode 230	
2022	All That Pingpong!	Cast Member		

=== Web shows ===
Year	Title	Role	Notes	Ref.
2021	Where are you, Eun-seok!	Host	Dumdum Studio	

=== Music video appearances ===
Year	Artist	Song title
2021	Ailee	"Make Up Your Mind"

== Stage ==
=== Concert ===
Concert performances
Year	Title		Role	Theater	Date	Ref.
Year	English	Korean	Role	Theater	Date	Ref.
2016	Musical Talk Concert Housewarming - The Rest of the Class	뮤지컬 토크 콘서트 집들이 - 나머지 수업	Tae	TOM Theatre 2	May 30, 2016	

=== Theater ===
Theater play performances of Park
Year	Title		Role	Venue	Date	Ref.
Year	English	Korean	Role	Venue	Date	Ref.
2010	Rooftop House Cat	옥탑방 고양이	Lee Kyung-min	Daehakro Tintin Hall	—N/a	
2012	Rooftop House Cat	옥탑방 고양이	Lee Kyung-min	Daehakro Tintin Hall		
2013	True West	트루웨스트	Austin	CJ Ajit Daehak-ro (formerly SM Art Hall)	February 21 - May 5	
2013	It's a concert tomorrow, what should I do?	2013 마로니에여름축제 - 내일 공연인데 어떡하지!	Choreographer	Daehak-ro Arts Theatre Grand Theatre	July 20 - 27	
2013	Hamlet	햄릿	Hamlet	Seoul Arts Centre Free Small Theatre	September 20 - October 13	
2013	A Short Romance	쩨쩨한 로맨스	Jeong-bae	CJ Ajit Daehak-ro (formerly SM Art Hall)	September 29 - June 29	
2013	It's a concert tomorrow, what should I do?	2013 마로니에여름축제 - 내일 공연인데 어떡하지!	Choreographer	Daehak-ro Arts Theatre Grand Theatre	October 12 - 15	
2013	Hamlet	햄릿	Hamlet	Small Theatre Gwangya (formerly Daehak-ro Arts Theatre 3)	October 17 - November 24	
2013–2014	Almost, Maine	올모스트 메인		Sangmyung Art Hall 1	November 11– January 19	
2014	The History Boys	히스토리보이즈	Dakin	Doosan Art Centre Yeongang Hall	March 14 - April 20	
2014	Theatre's Heated Battle 5 - The Pride	연극열전5 - 프라이드	Sylvia	Art One Theater Hall 2	August 16 – November 9	
2014	Cock	수탉들의 싸움	John	Doosan Art Centre Space111	July 11 - August 3	
2015	Red	레드	Ken	Chungmu Art Centre Middle Theatre Black	May 3 - 31	
2015	Capone Trilogy	카포네 트릴로지	Youngman	Hongik University Daehak-ro Art Centre Small Theatre	July 14 - October 4	
2015-2016	The Elephant Song	엘리펀트 송	Michael Alin	Yes 24 Stage 3	November 13 - January 31, 2016	
2016	The History Boys	히스토리보이즈	Dakin	Baekam Art Hall	April 8 - May 8	
2016	Closer	클로저	Dan	Yegreen Theater	September 6 to November 13, 2016	
2017	Our Bad Magnet	나쁜자석	Fraser	Art One Theatre 1	March 5 - May 28	
2017	The Elephant Song	엘리펀트 송	Michael Alin	Soo-hyun Theatre	September 6 - November 26, 2017	
2017-2018	Blind	블라인드	Ruben	Yes 24 Stage 3	December 6 - February 4	
2018	Blind	블라인드	Ruben	Ulsan Culture and Arts Centre Small Performance Hall	March 30 - 31	
2018-2019	Bunker Trilogy	벙커 트릴로지	Soldier 2	Hongik University Daehangno Art Center Small Theater	December 11, 2018– February 24, 2019	
2018	Never the Sinner	네버 더 시너	Rob	Yes 24 Stage 2	January 30 - April 15	
2018	Art	아트	Marc	Uniplex 2	September 7 - November 4	
2019	Another Country	어나더컨트리	Debbienish	Interpark Uniplex	May 21 - August 18, 2019	
2019	The History Boys	히스토리보이즈	Dakin	Doosan Art Centre Yeongang Hall	September 20 - October 27, 2019	
2019	The Legend of Georgia McBride	조지아 맥브라이드의 전설	Casey	Uniplex 2nd Theater	November 27, 2019 – February 23, 2020	
2020	Art	아트	Marc	Baekam Art Hall	March 7 - May 31, 2020	
2020	The History Boys	히스토리보이즈	Dakin	Doosan Art Centre Yeongang Hall	September 19 - November 8	
2020-2021	Amadeus	아마데우스	Wolfgang Amadeus Mozart	Gwanglim Art Centre BBCH Hall	November 17, 2020 - February 28, 2021	
2022	Art	아트	Marc	Yes 24 Stage 1	September 17 - December 11, 2022	
2022	The History Boys	히스토리보이즈	Dakin	Doosan Art Centre Yeongang Hall	October 1 - November 20	
2023	Faust	파우스트	Faust (young)	LG Arts Center SEOUL	March 31 - April 29	
2023	The History Boys	히스토리보이즈	Dakin	Doosan Art Centre Yeongang Hall	June 13 - August 13	
2023	Café Juenes	카페 쥬에네스	Amakusa Aki	TOM Hall 2 in Daehangno	September 25 – November 26	
2024	Art	아트	Marc	Link Art Centre Bugs Hall	February 13 - May 12, 2024	

== Accolades ==
=== Awards and nominations ===
Name of the award ceremony, year presented, category, nominee of the award, and the result of the nomination
Award ceremony	Year	Category	Nominee	Result	Ref.
Stage Talk Audience's Choice Awards (SACA) (Note: StageTalk Audience's Choice Awards (SACA) is theater and musical award festival that decides the winner based on pure votes from fans of the performance.)	2015	Popular Actor Award	Park Eun-sook	Won	
The 12th Interpark Golden Ticket Awards (Note: The Golden Ticket Awards (골든티켓어워즈) is an awards ceremony that selects works and people who have shown the best ticket power by performance genre during the year. Since 2005, Interpark has held an awards ceremony by adding up ticket sales, ranking scores, and online voting for each year at the end of the year.)	2016	Theatrical Actor Award	The Elephant Song; The History Boys; Closer	Won	
MBC Drama Awards	2018	Excellence Award, Actor in a Monday-Tuesday Miniseries	Partners for Justice	Won	
KBS Drama Awards	2019	Male Rookie Award	Doctor Prisoner; Drama Special – Clean and Polish	Nominated	
KBS Drama Awards	2019	Actor in One-act Drama	Drama Special – Clean and Polish	Nominated	
SBS Drama Awards	2020	Best Supporting Actor	The Penthouse: War in Life	Won	
SBS Drama Awards	2021	Excellence Award for an Actor in a Mini-Series Genre/Fantasy Drama	The Penthouse: War in Life	Nominated	

=== Listicles ===
Name of publisher, year listed, name of listicle, and placement
Publisher	Year	Listicle	Placement	Ref.
Forbes	2022	Korea Power Celebrity	24th	
