= Mad for Each Other =

2021 South Korean television series

- Promotional poster
- Hangul: 이 구역의 미친 X
- RR: I guyeogui michin X
- MR: I kuyŏgŭi mich'in X
- Genre: Comedy; Romance
- Created by: Kakao Entertainment
- Written by: Ah Kyung
- Directed by: Lee Tae-gon
- Starring: Jung Woo; Oh Yeon-seo
- Country of origin: South Korea
- Original language: Korean
- No. of episodes: 13

Production
- Production companies: Kakao Entertainment; S-PEACE

Original release
- Network: KakaoTV; Netflix
- Release: May 24 – June 21, 2021

Mad for Each Other (Korean: 이 구역의 미친 X) is a 2021 South Korean television series starring Jung Woo and Oh Yeon-seo. It aired from May 24 to June 21, 2021 on KakaoTV and Netflix on Mondays, Tuesdays and Wednesdays.

== Synopsis ==
Noh Hwi-oh (Jung Woo) works as a detective. He thinks that he has a pretty decent life. One day, an incident takes place. This causes Noh Hwi-oh's life to change. He becomes a crazy guy, unable to control his anger and he gets angry at everything. He tries to return to his former self, but, during this time, he gets involved with another crazy person, Lee Min-kyung (Oh Yeon-seo). She has a sophisticated appearance and a fine job, but something happens to her. Her ordinary life collapses and she doesn't trust anyone anymore. She has delusions and is compulsive. Noh Hwi-oh and Lee Min-kyung become attracted to each other.

== Cast ==
=== Main ===
- Jung Woo as Noh Hwi-oh: a detective in the violent crimes division of the Gangnam Police Station who has problems with anger that leads him to be suspended.
- Oh Yeon-seo as Lee Min-kyung: a woman who is caught up in her own delusions and compulsions that are the result of her past.

=== Supporting ===
- Baek Ji-won as Kim In-ja
- Lee Hye-eun as Choi Sun-young
- Lee Yeon-doo as Lee Joo-ri
- Lee Su-hyun as Lee Su-hyun
- Ahn Woo-yeon as Lee Sang-yeob
- Seo Hye-won as Survey woman

== Accolades ==
Award ceremony	Year	Category	Nominee	Result	Ref.
APAN Star Awards	2022	Web Drama Award	Mad for Each Other	Nominated	
Blue Dragon Series Awards	2022	Best Leading Actress	Oh Yeon-seo	Nominated	
