= Oh Chang-seok =

South Korean actor (born 1982)

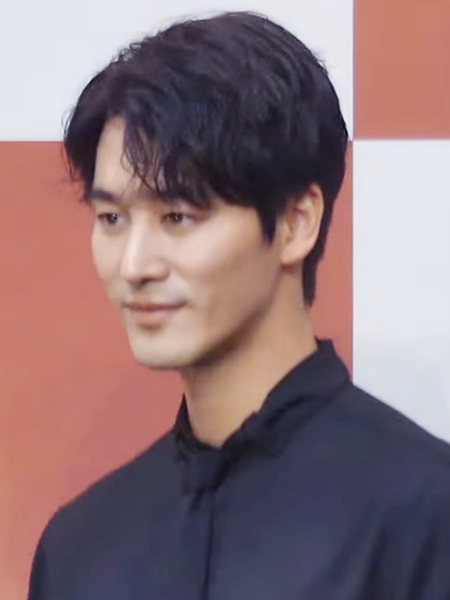
- Oh in May 2019
- Born: June 2, 1982 (age 44); Seoul, South Korea
- Education: Sejong University - Industrial Design
- Occupation: Actor
- Years active: 2007–present
- Agent: HB Entertainment

Korean name
- Hangul: 오창석
- Hanja: 吳昶錫
- RR: O Changseok
- MR: O Ch'angsŏk

Oh Chang-seok (Korean: 오창석; born June 2, 1982) is a South Korean actor. He is best known for his leading role in the 2013 television series Princess Aurora.

== Personal life ==
On July 2, 2019, Oh and model Lee Chae-eun confirmed their relationship when they took on the role of first pitcher and batter at a baseball game. The two began their relationship after appearing on the romance reality show Taste of Dating. They have since parted ways.

== Filmography ==
=== Film ===
Year	Title	Role
2007	May 18	Member of the citizen militia
2010	Come, Closer	Young-soo
2015	Mission: Kidnap the Top Star	Yoon Bin
2019	The House	Jo Joon-ee

=== Television series ===
Year	Title	Role	Notes/Ref.
2008	Worlds Within	Sung So-yoo	
2009	The Return of Iljimae		
2010	Athena: Goddess of War	Lee Dong-hoon	
2012	Love, My Love	Park No-kyung	
2013	Princess Aurora	Hwang Ma-ma	
2014	Jang Bo-ri Is Here!	Lee Jae-hee	
2015	My Heart Twinkle Twinkle	Cha Do-hoon	
2015	You Will Love Me	Oh Geun-baek	
2016	Entourage	Himself	Cameo
2017	Innocent Defendant	Kang Jun-hyuk	
2018	Rich Man	Min Tae-joo	
2019	A Place in the Sun	Oh Tae-yang / Kim Yoo-wol	
2022	The Witch's Game	Kang Ji-ho	
2024	The Two Sisters	Baek Seong-yoon	

=== Television show ===
Year	Title	Role
2016	King of Mask Singer	Contestant as "A Feisty Little Prince" (Episode 59)
2016	Law of the Jungle in East Timor	Cast member (Episodes 241–246)
2017	Living Together in Empty Room	Cast member with T-ara's Jiyeon (Episodes 16–19)

== Awards and nominations ==
Year	Award	Category	Nominated work	Result	Ref.
2012	20th Korean Culture and Entertainment Awards	Best New Actor in a TV Drama	Love, My Love	Won	
2013	2nd APAN Star Awards	Best New Actor	Princess Aurora	Nominated	
2013	MBC Drama Awards	Best New Actor	Princess Aurora	Won	
2014	MBC Drama Awards	Excellence Award, Actor in a Serial Drama	Jang Bo-ri is Here!	Nominated	
2016	10th Cable TV Broadcasting Awards	Best Couple Award with Lee Tae-im	You Will Love Me	Nominated	
2019	KBS Drama Awards	Excellence Award, Actor in a Daily Drama	A Place in the Sun	Nominated	
2021	7th APAN Star Awards	Excellence Award, Actor in a Serial Drama	A Place in the Sun	Nominated	
2023	Scene Stealer Festival	Bonsang "Main Prize"	The Witch Games	Won	
2025	MBC Drama Awards	Excellence Award, Actor in a Daily/Short Drama	The Woman Who Swallowed the Sun	Won	
