= The Penthouse: War in Life =

2020–2021 South Korean television series

- Promotional poster for season three
- Also known as: Penthouse; The Penthouse
- Hangul: 펜트하우스
- Lit.: Penthouse
- RR: Penteuhauseu
- MR: P'ent'ŭhausŭ
- Genre: Suspense; Drama; Crime; Revenge; Thriller; Mystery
- Developed by: Studio S (Planning)
- Written by: Kim Soon-ok
- Directed by: Joo Dong-min (S1–3); Park Bo-ram (S1); Park Soo-jin (S2–3)
- Starring: Lee Ji-ah; Kim So-yeon; Eugene; Um Ki-joon; Yoon Jong-hoon; Shin Eun-kyung; Bong Tae-kyu; Park Eun-seok; Yoon Joo-hee
- Music by: Kim Joon-seok; Jeong Se-rin; Czech National Symphony Orchestra
- Opening theme: A Place Dizzyingly High And Distant composed by Kim Joon-seok
- Ending theme: Time To Reveal The Truth composed by Joo In-ro
- Country of origin: South Korea
- Original language: Korean
- No. of seasons: 3
- No. of episodes: 48

Production
- Executive producers: Choi Young-hoon (S1); Park Young-soo (S2–3); Cho Seung-Hoon (CP)
- Producers: Kim Sang-hyun; Cho Hyeon-jin; Cho Jin Wook
- Editors: Jo In-hyeong; Park Ji-hyun; Lim Ho-cheol
- Running time: 70–95 minutes
- Production companies: Studio S (SBS); Chorokbaem Media
- Budget: ₩32.7 billion (670–680 million per episode)

Original release
- Network: SBS TV
- Release: October 26, 2020 – September 10, 2021

The Penthouse: War in Life (Korean: 펜트하우스) is a South Korean television series starring Lee Ji-ah, Kim So-yeon, Eugene, Um Ki-joon, Yoon Jong-hoon, and Park Eun-seok. The series, directed by Joo Dong-min and written by Kim Soon-ok, spins the story of a real estate and education war, a desire to be number one. It depicts the solidarity and revenge of women who turned to evil to protect themselves and their children. It premiered on SBS TV on October 26, 2020.

At the end of the first season, the series was the 9th most viewed Korean television series, with 5.354 million viewers. The series achieved the number-one position in all-channel mini-series 21 times in a row from its first broadcast on October 26, 2020, to the last episode on January 5, 2021.

At the end of the second season, the series placed 8th among the most viewed Korean series, with 5.69 million viewers. The series achieved the number-one position in all-channel mini-series 13 times in a row from its first broadcast on February 19, 2021, to the last episode on April 2, 2021.

At the end of the third season on September 10, 2021, the series was the 18th most-viewed Korean series with 3.77 million viewers.

== Series overview ==
Season	Episodes	Originally released		Time slot	Avg. viewership (millions)
Season	Episodes	First released	Last released	Time slot	Avg. viewership (millions)
1	21	October 26, 2020	January 5, 2021	Monday–Tuesday at 22:00 (KST)	3.35
2	13	February 19, 2021	April 2, 2021	Friday–Saturday at 22:00 (KST)	4.67
3	14	June 4, 2021	September 10, 2021	Friday at 22:00 (KST)	3.39

== Plot summary ==
=== Season 1 ===
Penthouse tells the story of wealthy families living in Hera Palace and their children at Cheong-ah Arts School.

Shim Su-ryeon (Lee Ji-ah) is an elegant, wealthy woman who has a tragic past. Her husband is Joo Dan-tae (Uhm Ki-joon), a successful businessman. She later learns that he is hiding a secret from her.

Oh Yoon-hee (Eugene) comes from a humble family background. She has had bad blood with Cheon Seo-jin (Kim So-yeon), a famous soprano whose father is the head of Cheong-ah Arts School, since high school. They get involved in a love triangle relationship with Ha Yoon-cheol (Yoon Jong-hoon).

All of them have grand ambitions and desires for their children and would do anything for them. However, their lives begin to crumble as a young mysterious girl named Min Seol-ah (Jo Soo-min) falls to her death during a party at Hera Palace. While the Hera Palace residents try to cover up the fact that she died on the premises, they cannot help but suspect each other in the murder.

=== Season 2 ===
Penthouse 2 focuses on Shim Su-ryeon's secrets and the aftermath of her death, Oh Yoon-hee's revenge, Cheon Seo-jin's downfall, and the Hera Palace kids who want to be the best and win the grand award at the Cheong-ah Arts Festival.

After successfully framing Oh Yoon-hee for murder, Cheon Seo-jin and Joo Dan-tae decided to get married. Their engagement party is interrupted by Oh Yoon-hee and Ha Yoon-cheol, who have just come back from the United States. As the secrets unveil, the relationships among the people at Hera Palace are entangled, yet another mysterious figure appears and confronts them.

=== Season 3 ===
Penthouse 3 focuses on the residents of Hera Palace after their trials and their kids who prepare themselves to take the college entrance examination.

Just when Shim Su-Ryeon, who faked her death in Season 1, thinks she can finally live happily, Logan Lee (Park Eun-seok) dies right before her eyes. Meanwhile, the Hera Palace residents get out of prison and attempt to get their lives back together. This starts the final lap of greed, corruption, injustice and redemption.

== Cast ==
=== Character appearances ===
Character	Portrayed by	Season		
Character	Portrayed by	1	2	3
Main
Shim Su-ryeon	Lee Ji-ah	Main	Main	Main
Na Ae-gyo	Lee Ji-ah		Main	
Cheon Seo-jin	Kim So-yeon	Main	Main	Main
Oh Yoon-hee	Eugene	Main	Main	Main
Recurring
Joo Dan-tae/Baek Joon-ki	Um Ki-joon	Recurring	Recurring	Recurring
Ha Yoon-cheol	Yoon Jong-hoon	Recurring	Recurring	Recurring
Lee Gyu-jin	Bong Tae-gyu	Recurring	Recurring	Recurring
Kang Ma-ri	Shin Eun-kyung	Recurring	Recurring	Recurring
Go Sang-ah	Yoon Joo-hee	Recurring	Recurring	Recurring
Joo Seok-hoon	Kim Young-dae	Recurring	Recurring	Recurring
Joo Seok-kyung	Han Ji-hyun	Recurring	Recurring	Recurring
Bae Ro-na	Kim Hyun-soo	Recurring	Recurring	Recurring
Ha Eun-byeol	Choi Ye-bin	Recurring	Recurring	Recurring
Yoo Jenny	Jin Ji-hee	Recurring	Recurring	Recurring
Lee Min-hyeok	Lee Tae-vin	Recurring	Recurring	Recurring
Secretary Jo	Kim Dong-kyu	Recurring	Recurring	Recurring
Ma Doo-ki	Ha Do-kwon	Recurring	Recurring	Recurring
Wang Mi-ja	Seo Hye-rin	Recurring	Recurring	Recurring
Logan Lee	Park Eun-seok	Recurring	Recurring	Recurring
Gu Ho-dong	Park Eun-seok	Recurring		
Alex Lee	Park Eun-seok			Guest
Jin Bun-hong	Ahn Yeon-hong		Recurring	Recurring
Yoo Dong-pil	Park Ho-san		Guest	Recurring
Baek Joon-ki / Joo Dan-tae	On Joo-wan		Guest	Recurring
Minor
Kang Ok-gyo	Ha Min	Guest	Guest	Guest
Cheon Seo-young	Shin Seo-hyun	Guest	Guest	Guest
Anna Lee/Min Seol-ah	Jo Soo-min	Guest	Guest	
Cheon Myung-soo	Jung Sung-mo	Guest	Guest	
Journalist Kim Jung-min	Ki Eun-se	Guest	Guest	
Joo Hye-in	Na So-ye	Guest		Guest
Yoon Tae-joo	Lee Chul-min	Guest		
Su-ryeon's ex-husband	Ki Tae-hwa	Guest		
Detective in charge of Oh Yoon-hee's investigation	Kim Sa-kwon	Guest		
Bae Ho-cheol	Choi Won-young	Guest		
Yoon-hee's mother-in-law	Hwang Young-hee	Guest		
Seo-young's husband	Ahn Tae-hwan	Guest		

=== Main ===
- Lee Ji-ah as Shim Su-ryeon / Na Ae-gyo

Shim Su-ryeon: A graceful, elegant woman who is kind and thoughtful, despite her immense wealth. She and her husband, Joo Dan-tae, live in the penthouse of Hera Palace, making her the queen of the building's social clique. Learning of her husband's affair with Cheon Seo-jin and his involvement in the death of her daughter Min Seol-ah, she is determined to take revenge against him. Later in the series, she is also revealed to be the biological mother of Joo Seok-kyung.

Na Ae-gyo: Business partner and mistress to Joo Dan-tae, lover to Jung Doo-man and the biological mother of Joo Seok-hoon. She bears a striking resemblance to Shim Su-ryeon and has a butterfly tattoo on her back.

- Kim So-yeon as Cheon Seo-jin

One of the primary antagonists of the series. She is a wealthy woman who is the epitome of extravagant arrogance and harbors warped ambitions. She would do anything for power, money, and pride. She and Oh Yoon-hee have been bitter rivals since childhood. She pushes her daughter, Ha Eun-byeol, to sing in order to beat Oh Yoon-hee's daughter, Bae Ro-na, who is more talented than her.

- Eugene as Oh Yoon-hee

A woman whose dreams have been stunted by her lack of money and power. With gritted teeth, she took on any job and humiliation to support her daughter's ambitions of becoming an opera singer. She and Cheon Seo-jin have been bitter rivals since childhood. She does everything in her power to move up socially and financially so that her daughter, Bae Ro-na, is able to enter the prestigious Cheong-ah Arts School.

=== Supporting ===
==== Shim Su-ryeon/Na Ae-gyo's family ====
- Kim Young-dae as Joo Seok-hoon (Baek Seok-hoon)

Joo Dan-tae (Baek Joon-ki) and Na Ae-gyo's son; Shim Su-ryeon's stepson; Ha Eun-byeol, Joo Seok-kyung and Min Seol-ah's step brother. He is a calm, self-contained, and observant piano student who protects his twin sister, Seok-kyung, from their abusive father. Because of his father's evil deeds, he slowly becomes resentful towards him as the series progresses. He falls in love with Bae Ro-na, despite Ha Eun-byeol's jealousy and his twin sister's vehement disapproval.

- Han Ji-hyun as Joo Seok-kyung (Jo Seok-Kyung)

Shim Su-ryeon's biological twin daughter; Min Seol-Ah's younger fraternal twin sister and Joo Seok-hoon's step sister. Seok-kyung was abducted by Joo Dan-tae and ended up as Seok-hoon's twin sister at birth. As a result, this caused her to believe that her own mother is the stepmother. She is a cunning, selfish, and scheming soprano student. She has been physically and emotionally abused by Joo Dan-tae; therefore, she bullied her classmates mercilessly, took her stepmother Su-ryeon for granted, and manipulated Seok-hoon for her needs.

- Jo Soo-min as Anna Lee / Min Seol-ah (Jo Seol-ah)

Shim Su-ryeon's biological twin daughter; Joo Seok-kyung's older fraternal twin sister; and Joo Seok-hoon's step sister; Alex and Logan Lee's adopted sister. Seol-ah was switched out with Hye-in at birth, and abandoned as an orphan. She is intelligent, humane, compassionate, hard-working, and has the talent of a gifted soprano singer. She disguises herself as Anna Lee, a math tutor who graduated from UCLA, and tutors the Hera Palace children as she is in desperate need of money. She later enters the Cheong-ah Art School but is bullied and ostracized by her classmates including her twin sister. She dies under mysterious circumstances at the Hera Palace after attempting to expose the bullying and admission manipulation at the school.

- Na So-ye as Joo Hye-in (Kim Hye-in)

Kim Mi-sook's biological daughter; raised by Shim Su-ryeon. She was switched out with Seol-ah at birth. As she was born sickly, Joo Dan-tae tried to kill her in order to obtain her land and properties but Su-ryeon saves her and sends her to safety to America where she currently resides.

==== Cheon Seo-jin's family ====
- Um Ki-joon as Joo Dan-tae (fake identity) / Baek Joon-ki (real identity)

One of the primary antagonists of the series. Former husband and nemesis of Shim Su-ryeon, former lover of Na Ae-gyo, current husband of Cheon Seo-jin. He is the biological father of Joo Seok-hoon (Baek Seok-hoon); the stepfather of Ha Eun-byeol, Joo Seok-kyung and Min Seol-ah and the adoptive father of Joo Hye-in. As the chairman of J King Holding who rakes in money with every investment he makes, he only cares about making more. He is a cruel, greedy, sadistic, and manipulative control freak who will not hesitate to kill anyone who gets into his way. His goal is to build a luxury building called "Joo Dan-tae Village" in the Cheon-su district. He was responsible for the events of Su-ryeon's tragic past such as murdering her previous husband, separating her twin daughters away from her- one was switched with another child eventually abandoned while another believes the mother is the stepmother.

- Choi Ye-bin as Ha Eun-byeol

Cheon Seo-jin's daughter; Joo Dan-tae (Baek Joon-ki)'s stepdaughter. She is constantly being pressured by her mother to sing better than Bae Ro-na. She was in love with Joo Seok-hoon, who doesn't reciprocate her feelings. At first, Eun-byeol appears to be nice - however, due to her mother's expectations and Joo Seok-kyung's influence, her personality changes drastically. Although she is cruel like her mother, she is easily tormented by manipulative people. The pressure caused by her mother led her to become psychopathic, and she is diagnosed with imposter syndrome. She develops a hatred of Bae Ro-na.

- Jung Sung-mo as Cheon Myung-soo

Seo-jin's father. He is intent on keeping Cheong-ah Arts School's reputation intact at all costs. Due to this he tries to give the foundation to Seo-young after Seo-jin's divorce as he learned of Seo-jin's affair.

- Ha Min as Kang Ok-gyo

Seo-jin's stepmother who fails to take care of Eun-byeol while she was in prison.

- Shin Seo-hyun as Cheon Seo-young

Seo-jin's younger half-sister who is later caught having an affair with another man behind her husband's back, which Seo-jin uses against her.

- Ahn Tae-hwan as Seo-young's husband

Seo-jin's brother-in-law.

==== Oh Yoon-hee's family ====
- Yoon Jong-hoon as Ha Yoon-cheol

Former husband of Cheon Seo-jin and current husband and first love of Oh Yoon Hee. He's the father of Bae Ro-na. An ambitious man who believes that a man must hold wealth and power. He is the head of surgery in the VIP department of a hospital. He divorces Seo-jin at the end of season 1, and marries Yoon-hee in season 2, his first love.

- Kim Hyun-soo as Bae Ro-na

Ha Yoon-cheol and Oh Yoon-hee's daughter. She is a gifted soprano singer who wants to do her best in school and enter Seoul National University. She was scammed by Ma Du-ki and was on the waiting list to enter Cheong-ah High School, but was cast off the waiting list after Min Seol-ah's death. Similar to Seol-ah, she deals with bullying and ostracization by her classmates and the other Hera Palace kids, but she is able to stand up for herself.

- Hwang Young-hee as Yoon-hee's mother-in-law

She was paid by Cheon Seo-jin to make a scene at Hera Palace, accuse Yoon-hee of not letting her visit her granddaughter, Bae Ro-na, and blames Yoon-hee for the death of her son. She is a woman who would do anything for money.

- Choi Won-young as Bae Ho-cheol

Oh Yoon-hee's first husband. It is later revealed that he cheated on Yoon-hee. He died prior to the events in the series.

==== Kang Ma-ri and family ====
- Shin Eun-kyung as Kang Ma-ri

A woman who has recently come into wealth and leads a secretive double life. She lies and tells everyone that her husband, Yoo Jenny's father, is doing business in Dubai but in reality, he is in prison. She bribes the guards with expensive goods to let her see her husband in prison. She advises her daughter to become friends with Joo Seok-hoon, Joo Seok-kyung, Lee Min-hyeok, and Ha Eun-byeol so that she can get on the good side of the wealthy people of Hera Palace.

- Jin Ji-hee as Yoo Jenny

Kang Ma-ri and Yoo Dong-pil's daughter. She went to the same middle school as Bae Ro-na and were enemies. She accused Ron-Na of poisoning her drink which nearly caused Ro-na to be expelled from school. However, at the end of season 1, she started to warm up with Ro-na by giving her food when Ro-na was accused to be the daughter of a murderer. Later on, she started to develop a friendship with Ro-na.

- Park Ho-san as Yoo Dong-pil

Kang Ma-ri's husband and Jenny's father. He loves his family very much and does not put any pressure on his daughter. He was previously in prison but was released at the end of season 2.

==== Lee Kyu-jin and family ====
- Bong Tae-gyu as Lee Kyu-jin

The only son of a wealthy family of judges and lawyers, and is himself a lawyer. In season 2, he became an assemblyman in Gangnam.

- Yoon Joo-hee as Go Sang-ah

Wife of Lee Kyu-jin and a former announcer. She is unhappy with her marriage, and is constantly bullied by her mother-in-law and sisters-in-law.

- Lee Tae-vin as Lee Min-hyeok

Lee Kyu-jin and Go Sang-ah's spoiled son who loves to bully his classmates for amusement due to Joo Seok-kyung's influence, and doesn't have any significant interests.

- Seo Hye-rin as Wang Mi-ja

Kyu-jin's mother and a former actress who has an amassed a fortune from a career in culinary television.

=== Others ===
- Park Eun-seok as Gu Ho-dong/Logan Lee/Alex Lee

Gu Ho-dong: A strict but nice P.E teacher at Cheong-ah Arts School. He does the right thing and punishes students at Cheong-ah Arts School for bullying Bae Ro-na and Min Seol-ah even though the parents and faculty were unhappy and against it. His true identity was later revealed as Logan Lee, an American billionaire of ethnic Korean descent.
Logan Lee: He is a Korean-American successful billionaire, Alex Lee's younger brother, and Min Seol-ah's older adoptive brother who grew up with a bone marrow illness and a sense of justice. He was very close with his adopted sister and was extremely upset when his parents used her as his donor. He overheard the entire incident when Seol-ah was bullied by Hera Palace kids while he was on the phone with her, and is determined to punish them. He teamed up with Su-ryeon in taking down the Hera Palace residents responsible for Seol-ah's death, Su-ryeon after understanding her pain and hardship. He is willing to risk his life to protect her from danger.
Alex Lee: He is Logan's older brother. He came to the Penthouse to find out more about Logan's alleged death and shows bitterness towards Su-ryeon. Unlike Logan, Alex is hot-tempered and shows a tough love for his brother.

- Ha Do-kwon as Ma Doo-ki

Music teacher at Cheong-ah Arts School. He is a man who would do anything for money. In season 3, he was dismissed in all positions of Cheong-ah Arts School because of his wrongdoings.

- Lee Cheol-min as Yoon Tae-joo

Joo Dan-tae's previous secretary, he betrayed Dan-tae and was later killed in a car accident.

- Kim Dong-kyu as Secretary Jo

The current secretary of Joo Dan-tae.

- Kim Do-hyun as Secretary Do

Cheon Seo-jin's personal secretary.

- Kim Jae-hong as Secretary Hong

The secretary of Logan Lee.

- Ahn Yeon-hong as Jin Bun-hong

She is undercover for Logan Lee working as a personal tutor and caretaker for Eun-byeol. As part of her job, she relates information to Yoon-hee and Logan. She becomes affectionate towards Ha Eun-byeol due to a traumatic past about her daughter.

- On Joo-wan as Baek Joon-ki (Fake Identity)/Joo Dan-tae (Real Identity)

Initially named "Joon-ki", a mysterious figure who appeared at the end of Season 2, sitting beside Logan Lee during his return flight to South Korea and was last seen hastily leaving Logan's car moments before the explosion. In Season 3, it was revealed (through an extended scene with Logan inside the plane) that Baek Joon-ki's real name is Joo Dan-tae, and that the person who has long been using his identity was actually a serial killer named Baek Joon-ki (hence his "Mister Baek" moniker), who also stole his parents' fortune after killing them in Japan. He is the only person who knows Joo Dan-tae's darkest secret.

- Lee So-yeon as Kim Mi-sook

Joo Hye-in's biological mother who abandoned Hye-in for money and was murdered by Joo Dan-tae.

- Oh Min-ae as Ms. Byeon
- Han Soo-ah as Song Ye-ri
- Song Duk-ho as Ye Tae-sool

=== Special appearances ===
Season 1
- Byeon Woo-min as Congressman Jo Sang-heon (Ep. 1–2, 4–5)

He attempted to kill Su-Ryeon when she found out about his fraud but was later murdered.

- Ki Tae-hwa as Su-ryeon's ex-husband (Ep. 3)

He was Su-ryeon's previous husband prior her marriage to Joo Dan-tae, a gifted pianist who was murdered by Joo Dan-tae and gunmen. He is the biological father of Min Seol-ah and Joo Seok-kyung.

- Han Seung-soo as Orphanage Director Min Hyung-sik (Ep. 3, 5)
- Kim Byung-hyun as Joo Dan-tae's best friend pitcher (Ep. 12)
- Ki Eun-se as Journalist Kim Jung-min (Ep. 20–21)
- Kim Sa-kwon as Detective in charge of Oh Yoon-hee's investigation (Ep. 20–21)
Season 2
- Jun Jin as Wedding couple (Ep. 1)
- Ryu Yi-seo as Wedding couple (Ep. 1)
- Jang Sung-kyu as Assistant to Lee Gyu-jin (Ep. 1, 5, 11, 13)
- Lee Sang-woo as Reporter Son Hyung-jin (Ep. 2, 4)
- Bada as Park Young-ran (Ep. 2)
- Ki Eun-se as Journalist Kim Jung-min (Ep. 2, 7)
- Yeon Min-ji as Alumni of Yoon-hee and Seo-jin (Ep. 3)
- Nam Bo-ra as Pianist for Bae Ro-na (Ep. 5, 7)
- Lee Si-eon as Detective (Ep. 6)
- Kim Kwang-kyu as Fake detective (Ep. 8)

An actor hired by Dan-tae to act as a detective.

- Jo Jae-yoon as Hwang Geum-bong (Ep. 9–12)

A real estate agent well-versed with the upcoming redevelopment of Cheonjin District.

- Kim Dong-young as Detective (Ep. 11–12)
- Kim Soo-hwan as Detective (Ep. 11–12)
- Yoo Jun-sang as Jung Doo-man (Ep. 12–13)

A politician and boyfriend of Na Ae-gyo.

- On Joo-wan as Baek Joon-ki / Joo Dan-tae (Ep. 13)
- Choi Byung-mo as Judge (Ep. 13)
- Lee Sang-min as Prison Guard Jo (Ep. 13)
- Lee Su-ryun as Prosecutor (Ep. 13)
Season 3

- Park Sang-myun as Bang Chi-soon (Ep. 1)

Boss of men's prison cell.

- Jung Young-ju as Boss of women's prison cell (Ep. 1)
- Kwon Tae-won as Chief Justice Jung (Ep. 1)
- Lee Sang-min as Prison Guard Jo (Ep. 1)
- Yoo Yeon as Shim Su-ryeon's psychiatrist (Ep. 1)
- Nam Sung-jin as Joo Dan-tae's father (Ep. 3, 7)
- Sung Ji-ru as Oh Man-sik (Ep. 3, 6)
- Lee Jae-woo as Police officer (Ep. 5)
- Song Young-gyu as Kang Sin-mo (Ep. 6–7)

Minister of Education.

- Bae Hae-sun as Yoon Kyung-eun (Ep. 6–7)

Vice Minister of Education.

- Yoon Seok-hwa as Logan Lee's Grandmother (Ep. 7–9)
- Shin Sung-woo as Clark Lee (Ep. 7–8)
- Lee Yu-bi as Boss of girl's juvenile hall torments Joo Seok-kyung. (Ep. 7–8)
- Kim Joo-hee as News Anchor (Ep. 7)
- Kim Se-hee as News Anchor (Ep. 10, 12)
- Yoon Joo-man as Loan Shark (Ep. 11–12)
- Lee Tae-sung as Prosecutor (Ep. 11–12, 14)
- Seo Ji-seok as Detective (Ep. 11–13)
- Shin Seung-hwan as Doctor (Ep. 12–13)
- Heo Jung-min as Doctor (Ep. 12–13)
- Lim Seul-ong as Doctor (Ep. 13)
- Tae Hang-ho as Judge (Ep. 14)
- Kim Myung-soo as Cheon Seo-jin's lawyer (Ep. 14)
- Lee Hee-jin as Massage Customer's Daughter (Ep. 14)
- Kim Do-gun as Lee Kyu-jin's secretary
- Jang Sung-kyu as Defrauded Person (Ep. 14)
- Kim Beop-rae as Restaurant Owner (Ep. 14)
- Ahn Hye-kyung as Officer Lee Nam-sook (Ep. 14)
- Choi Yoon-so as Mental Hospital Nurse (Ep. 14)
- Bewhy as Lee Byung-hoon (Ep. 14)

== Production ==
=== Development ===
The production cost of this series is 32.7 billion won, 670 million won per episode (approximate). The series started its planning and preparation in September 2019.

The first season was extended by one episode to enable the series to end on a Tuesday.

On November 24, 2020, the series was officially renewed for a second and third season of twelve episodes each. It was also announced that the final seasons would air on the Friday–Saturday time slot compared to the first season previously aired on Monday–Tuesday time slot.

On July 22, 2021, it was announced that the third season was extended by two episode with the final episode of the series planned for September 10, 2021.

=== Casting ===
Eugene was cast in one of the lead roles, consequently returning to the small screen after a five-year hiatus. Casting for the series started in December 2019, and finalized in January 2020. Due to scheduling conflicts, Shin Sung-rok left the cast in February. Originally scheduled to take place in February 2020, the first script reading was pushed back to March due to COVID-19 pandemic. Um Ki-joon joined the cast in April.

=== Filming ===
Filming was halted on November 24, 2020, as one of the supporting actors was tested positive for COVID-19. The next day, it was reported that Um Ki-joon, Park Eun-seok and Bong Tae-gyu tested negative for COVID-19.

=== Release ===
The prelude teaser was released by Seoul Broadcasting System on September 22, 2020. The teaser was termed as "[Mood teaser] a brilliant bloody prelude". The first season premiered on October 26, 2020, on SBS TV and aired every Monday and Tuesday at 22:00 KST.

The teaser for season two was released on January 12, 2021. The second season premiered on February 19, 2021, and aired every Friday and Saturday at 22:00 KST.

The teaser for season three was released on May 27, 2021. The third season premiered on June 4, 2021, and aired every Friday at 22:00 KST.

== Original soundtrack ==
=== Season 1 ===
Original soundtrack for Season 1

Penthouse (Original Television Soundtrack)

Soundtrack album by Various artists
- Released: February 3, 2021
- Length: 97:27
- Languages: Korean; English
- Labels: THEGROOVE Company; Dreamus

Released on February 3, 2021
No.	Title	Artist	Length
1.	"Life"	HEDY	3:34
2.	"Crown"	Ha Jin	3:03
3.	"Desire"	Han Seung-hee	4:12
4.	"You left to me (Feat. O'z Mood)" (내게 남은 그대 (Feat. 오즈무드))	18Again, O'z Mood	3:21
5.	"Higher"	Noblesse	3:47
6.	"Penthouse" (펜트하우스)	Kim Jun-seok	3:06
7.	"A Blinded Person By Greed" (탐욕에 눈이 먼 자)	Jeong Se-rin	2:45
8.	"Time To Reveal The Truth" (진실을 밝힐 시간)	Joo In-ro	3:35
9.	"A Place Dizzyingly High And Distant" (아찔하게 높고 아득하게 먼 그 곳)	Kim Jun-seok	3:18
10.	"Their Own World" (그들만의 세상)	Lee Yun-ji	4:23
11.	"Heart Filled With Tears" (눈물로 채워진 심장)	Jeong Se-rin	3:39
12.	"Schadenfreude" (샤덴프로이데)	Kim Hyun-do	3:34
13.	"Evil's Victory" (악의 승리)	Joo In-ro	3:19
14.	"Where Is The Truth?" (무뎌진 진실은 어디에)	Jeong Se-rin	2:37
15.	"Everything I Wanted To have" (내가 가지고 싶었던 모든 것)	Yoo So-hyun	2:23
16.	"Preparation For Revenge" (복수를 위한 준비)	Hong Eun-ji	3:53
17.	"The Beginning Of Obsession" (집착의 시작)	Jeong Hye-bin	2:33
18.	"Another Class" (클래스가 다른 아이들)	Kang Mi-mi	3:00
19.	"I Promise To Protect You Forever" (지켜줄게요, 영원히)	Jeong Se-rin	2:55
20.	"Mama Boy" (마마보이)	Shin You-jin	3:07
21.	"Hera Pride" (헤라 부심)	Jang Eu-rye	2:17
22.	"I'm Not A Criminal" (저는 범인이 아니에요)	No Yoo-rim	2:49
23.	"Unfair Death" (억울한 죽음)	Shin You-jin	3:47
24.	"Non-Smiling People Although Having Taken Everything" (빼앗고도 웃지 못하는 사람들)	Jeong Se-rin	2:44
25.	"Just The Beginning" (시작에 불과해)	Kim Jun-seok	3:23
26.	"Dangerous Revenge" (위험한 복수)	Jang Eu-rye	2:47
27.	"A Secret Story" (은밀한 이야기)	Lee Yun-ji	4:21
28.	"Bloody Hera Palace" (핏빛 헤라팰리스)	Kim Hyun-do	3:05
29.	"I Know What You've Done" (네가 한 짓을 알고 있다)	Kim Do-eun	2:41
30.	"Desperate Maternal Love" (처절한 모성애)	Kim Do-eun	3:29
Total length:			97:27

=== Season 2 ===
Singles for Season 2 (Part 1–3)

Part 1

Released on March 9, 2021
No.	Title	Lyrics	Music	Artist	Length
1.	"Repeatedly" (되풀이)	Im Chang-jung	Han Kyung-soo (ARTMATIC); Lee Do-hyung (Lohi); bigguyrobin	Im Chang-jung	3:37
2.	"Repeatedly" (Inst.)		Han Kyung-soo (ARTMATIC); Lee Do-hyung (Lohi); bigguyrobin		3:37
Total length:					7:14

Part 2

Released on March 18, 2021
No.	Title	Lyrics	Music	Artist	Length
1.	"This Is What I Am" (이게 바로 나야)	Im Chang-jung	Im Chang-jung; WildBoar	Im Chang-jung	4:11
2.	"This Is What I Am" (Inst.)		Im Chang-jung; WildBoar		4:11
Total length:					8:22

Part 3

Released on March 26, 2021
No.	Title	Lyrics	Music	Artist	Length
1.	"The morass" (늪)	E-Race; Ha Jae-hong	E-Race; Choi Woo-seok; Baek Moo-hyun	Lee Ye-joon	3:16
2.	"The morass" (Inst.)		E-Race; Choi Woo-seok; Baek Moo-hyun		3:16
Total length:					6:32

=== Season 2 and 3 Score Album ===
Score album for Season 2 and 3

Penthouse 2&3 Score Album (Original Television Soundtrack)

Soundtrack album by Various artists
- Released: June 4, 2021
- Length: 100:45
- Label: Dreamus

Released on June 4, 2021
No.	Title	Artist	Length
1.	"A Bright Moment That Seems Eternal" (영원한 듯 찬란한 순간)	Kim Jun-seok	3:25
2.	"Prelude of Counterattack" (반격의 서막)	Jeong Se-rin	3:06
3.	"Revenge From Now On" (복수는 이제부터다)	Kim Hyun-do	3:33
4.	"An Endless Desire" (끝을 모르는 욕망)	Lee Yoon-ji	3:33
5.	"Public Wicked" (공공의 악인)	Joo In-ro	2:31
6.	"A Person Who Has Lost Everything But Can't Cry" (빼앗기고도 울지 못하는 사람)	Jeong Se-rin	4:54
7.	"The Two Faces of Janus" (야누스의 두 얼굴)	Jang Yoo-rye	3:02
8.	"The Villainess" (악녀)	No Yoo-rim	2:44
9.	"Confusing Memories" (혼란스러운 기억)	Shin Yoo-jin	2:29
10.	"Where You Have To Die To Get Out" (죽어야만 나갈 수 있는 곳)	Hong Eun-ji	4:11
11.	"The Hidden Truth Of The Day" (숨겨진 그 날의 진실)	Jung Hye-bin	2:51
12.	"The Reason I Live" (내가 살아가는 이유)	Jung Hye-bin	3:21
13.	"The Poor Women" (가난한 모녀)	No Yoo-rim	3:05
14.	"Little Hera Club" (리틀 헤라클럽)	Kim Do-eun	3:16
15.	"Truth And False" (진실과 거짓)	No Yoo-rim	2:37
16.	"Business Partner" (사업 파트너)	No Yoo-rim	3:04
17.	"Happiness for Misery" (불행을 위한 행복)	Kim Hyun-do	3:45
18.	"Inferiority Complex" (그거 자격지심이야)	Hong Eun-ji	2:33
19.	"Something That Happens Up There" (그곳에서 벌어지고 있는 일)	Jang Yoo-rye	2:30
20.	"Quite War" (조용한 전쟁)	Kang Mi-mi	2:58
21.	"Suspicions" (의혹)	Lee Yoon-ji	1:40
22.	"Murder Plan" (살인계획)	No Yoo-rim	2:50
23.	"Blind Madness" (눈이 먼 광기)	Yoo So-hyun	2:50
24.	"A Fallen Heart" (타락한 마음)	Shin Yoo-jin	3:01
25.	"Tight Tension" (팽팽한 긴장)	Kim Hyun-do	2:55
26.	"Evil Trio" (악 트리오)	Jang Yoo-rye	3:07
27.	"Operation Proceeds Smoothly" (순조로운 작전 진행)	Yoo So-hyun	2:49
28.	"Lost Self" (잃어버린 자아)	Kim Hyun-do	2:15
29.	"An Ominous Premonition" (불길한 예감)	Jeong Hye-bin	2:23
30.	"A Vulgar Conspiracy" (저급한 음모)	Hong Eun-ji	4:22
31.	"The Struggle To Achieve The Goal" (목표를 쟁취하기 위한 기 싸움)	Yoo So-hyun	2:36
32.	"Woman Who Desires" (욕망하는 여자)	Kang Mi-mi	2:47
33.	"Mr. Koo And Logan Lee" (구호동과 로건리)	No Yoo-rim	3:42
Total length:			100:45

=== Season 3 ===
Singles for Season 3

Part 1

Released on July 2, 2021
No.	Title	Lyrics	Music	Artist	Length
1.	"Goodbye"	SNNNY	SNNNY	XIA (Junsu)	3:41
2.	"Goodbye" (Inst.)		SNNNY		3:41
Total length:					7:22

Part 2

Released on July 16, 2021
No.	Title	Lyrics	Music	Artist	Length
1.	"Let me be"	Lee Ha-jin; Lee Dong-eun (Psycho Tension)	Safira.K	Baek Ji-young	4:27
2.	"Let me be" (Inst.)		Safira.K		4:27
Total length:					8:55

== Reception ==
=== Commercial performance ===
Season 1

According to the Good Data Corporation which measures drama popularity according to media trends, The Penthouse: War in Life topped the list with 27.82% surge in media mention in the second week of December. In the following week it led with a 35% surge in media mentions.

Season 2

In the last week of February 2021, The Penthouse: War in Life season 2 was placed first with 46.24% overall mention in media, as per Good Data Corporation.

Specials

The Penthouse broadcaster SBS TV, aired a special episode on January 12, 2021, featuring the main cast. Broadcast in talk show format, it was hosted by entertainers Shin Dong-yup and Jang Do-yeon, while MC Jaejae talked with the six actors that played the teenage characters. Aired as Penthouse Hidden Room - Hidden Story the special recorded an average 9.3% nationwide audience share according to Nielsen for its two parts. The special also drew attention due to the trailer release for second season. The special episode for second season was aired on April 3, 2021, with the episode recording an average 8.1% nationwide audience sharing according to Nielsen for its two parts.

=== Viewership ===
The Penthouse: War in Life : South Korea viewers per episode (millions)

Season	Episode number																					Average
Season	1	2	3	4	5	6	7	8	9	10	11	12	13	14	15	16	17	18	19	20	21	Average
1	1.657	1.735	1.916	2.379	2.217	2.549	2.537	2.646	2.739	3.017	3.419	3.455	4.054	4.149	4.340	4.404	4.379	4.339	4.484	4.550	5.354	3.348
2	3.758	4.027	4.165	4.550	4.585	5.264	4.481	4.901	4.462	5.410	4.804	5.601	4.735	–								4.673
3	3.778	3.518	3.206	3.263	3.191	3.169	3.357	2.971	3.092	3.624	3.681	3.565	3.444	3.638	–							3.393

Source: Audience measurement performed nationwide by Nielsen Korea.

Average TV viewership ratings (season 1)
Ep.	Part	Original broadcast date	Average audience share		
Ep.	Part	Original broadcast date	Nielsen Korea		TNmS
Ep.	Part	Original broadcast date	Nationwide	Seoul	Nationwide
1	1	October 26, 2020	6.7% (15th)	8.2% (8th)	5.2% (18th)
1	2	October 26, 2020	9.2% (5th)	10.5% (5th)	6.8% (11th)
1	3	October 26, 2020	9.1% (6th)	10.5% (5th)	6.5% (13th)
2	1	October 27, 2020	8.2% (7th)	9.4% (5th)	6.0% (13th)
2	2	October 27, 2020	9.8% (6th)	11.2% (4th)	7.0% (12th)
2	3	October 27, 2020	10.1% (4th)	11.6% (3rd)	7.4% (8th)
3	1	November 2, 2020	8.0% (9th)	8.6% (7th)	6.7% (12th)
3	2	November 2, 2020	11.4% (3rd)	12.3% (2nd)	9.8% (6th)
4	1	November 3, 2020	10.8% (5th)	12.0% (4th)	7.8% (7th)
4	2	November 3, 2020	13.9% (3rd)	15.1% (2nd)	10.3% (5th)
5	1	November 9, 2020	9.6% (6th)	10.8% (5th)	8.4% (9th)
5	2	November 9, 2020	12.9% (4th)	14.2% (2nd)	11.0% (5th)
6	1	November 10, 2020	10.3% (5th)	11.3% (3rd)	9.2% (6th)
6	2	November 10, 2020	14.5% (2nd)	16.1% (1st)	12.6% (2nd)
7	1	November 16, 2020	10.4% (6th)	11.4% (5th)	10% (7th)
7	2	November 16, 2020	14.5% (3rd)	15.9% (1st)	12.8% (4th)
8	1	November 23, 2020	11.1% (5th)	11.8% (5th)	10.8% (5th)
8	2	November 23, 2020	15.5% (3rd)	16.5% (2nd)	13.7% (3rd)
9	1	November 24, 2020	12.2% (3rd)	13.1% (3rd)	11.2% (3rd)
9	2	November 24, 2020	16.0% (2nd)	17.4% (1st)	14.1% (2nd)
10	1	November 30, 2020	13.2% (5th)	14.6% (4th)	12.3% (5th)
10	2	November 30, 2020	16.9% (3rd)	18.8% (1st)	15.7% (3rd)
11	1	December 1, 2020	14.7% (4th)	16.0% (3rd)	11.4% (4th)
11	2	December 1, 2020	19.6% (1st)	21.2% (1st)	13.3% (3rd)
12	1	December 7, 2020	16.3% (4th)	17.9% (2nd)	14.3% (4th)
12	2	December 7, 2020	19.9% (1st)	21.5% (1st)	16.1% (3rd)
13	1	December 8, 2020	17.6% (3rd)	19.2% (2nd)	15.5% (4th)
13	2	December 8, 2020	22.1% (1st)	23.9% (1st)	18.9% (2nd)
14	1	December 14, 2020	17.5% (4th)	19.5% (2nd)	16.6% (4th)
14	2	December 14, 2020	22.0% (1st)	23.9% (1st)	19.5% (2nd)
15	1	December 15, 2020	19.6% (2nd)	20.8% (2nd)	16.9% (4th)
15	2	December 15, 2020	23.3% (1st)	25.0% (1st)	20.8% (1st)
16	1	December 21, 2020	19.1% (3rd)	20.2% (2nd)	17.4% (4th)
16	2	December 21, 2020	23.7% (1st)	25.2% (1st)	21.1% (1st)
17	1	December 22, 2020	19.1% (3rd)	20.7% (2nd)	18.4% (4th)
17	2	December 22, 2020	24.0% (1st)	25.8% (1st)	22.4% (1st)
18	1	December 28, 2020	21.0% (2nd)	22.7% (2nd)	18.0% (3rd)
18	2	December 28, 2020	23.9% (1st)	25.7% (1st)	20.9% (1st)
19	1	December 29, 2020	21.3% (2nd)	22.3% (2nd)	19.1% (4th)
19	2	December 29, 2020	23.5% (1st)	24.7% (1st)	22.4% (1st)
20	1	January 4, 2021	20.4% (3rd)	21.6% (2nd)	18.3% (4th)
20	2	January 4, 2021	23.8% (1st)	25.2% (1st)	22.7% (1st)
21	1	January 5, 2021	23.6% (2nd)	24.8% (2nd)	20.6% (4th)
21	2	January 5, 2021	28.8% (1st)	30.5% (1st)	25.4% (1st)
Average			16.4%	17.7%	14.2%
Special	Part 1	January 12, 2021	9.8% (6th)	11.0% (4th)	N/A
Special	Part 2	January 12, 2021	8.8% (11th)	10.3% (5th)	N/A
The blue numbers represent the lowest ratings and the red numbers represent the highest ratings.; N/A denotes ratings that were not published.

Average TV viewership ratings (season 2)
Ep.	Part	Original broadcast date	Average audience share		
Ep.	Part	Original broadcast date	Nielsen Korea		TNmS
Ep.	Part	Original broadcast date	Nationwide	Seoul	Nationwide
1	1	February 19, 2021	16.7% (3rd)	17.3% (3rd)	15.1% (3rd)
1	2	February 19, 2021	19.1% (2nd)	19.9% (1st)	17.9% (2nd)
2	1	February 20, 2021	15.1% (7th)	15.6% (5th)	13.8% (7th)
2	2	February 20, 2021	20.4% (3rd)	21.0% (3rd)	18.0% (3rd)
3	1	February 26, 2021	18.9% (3rd)	19.7% (2nd)	17.8% (3rd)
3	2	February 26, 2021	22.3% (1st)	22.8% (1st)	20.6% (1st)
4	1	February 27, 2021	18.8% (4th)	20.3% (4th)	17.7% (4th)
4	2	February 27, 2021	24.0% (2nd)	26.1% (2nd)	22.8% (2nd)
5	1	March 5, 2021	20.9% (3rd)	22.5% (2nd)	18.1% (3rd)
5	2	March 5, 2021	24.4% (1st)	25.5% (1st)	21.3% (2nd)
6	1	March 6, 2021	22.4% (4th)	22.8% (4th)	20.4% (4th)
6	2	March 6, 2021	26.9% (2nd)	27.5% (2nd)	24.3% (2nd)
7	1	March 12, 2021	19.4% (3rd)	20.4% (2nd)	18.8% (3rd)
7	2	March 12, 2021	23.5% (1st)	24.3% (1st)	22.1% (1st)
8	1	March 13, 2021	19.9% (4th)	21.6% (3rd)	19.2% (3rd)
8	2	March 13, 2021	24.8% (1st)	26.1% (1st)	23.5% (1st)
9	1	March 19, 2021	20.8% (3rd)	22.1% (2nd)	19.4% (3rd)
9	2	March 19, 2021	23.6% (1st)	24.7% (1st)	21.5% (2nd)
10	1	March 20, 2021	20.3% (4th)	21.2% (3rd)	18.9% (4th)
10	2	March 20, 2021	26.6% (1st)	27.0% (1st)	24.1% (1st)
11	1	March 26, 2021	21.5% (2nd)	22.4% (2nd)	20.7% (3rd)
11	2	March 26, 2021	25.2% (1st)	26.3% (1st)	24.1% (1st)
12	1	March 27, 2021	22.9% (3rd)	24.5% (3rd)	21.8% (3rd)
12	2	March 27, 2021	29.2% (1st)	30.6% (1st)	26.6% (1st)
13	1	April 2, 2021	21.5% (3rd)	21.9% (3rd)	20.7% (3rd)
13	2	April 2, 2021	25.2% (2nd)		23.4% (2nd)
13	3	April 2, 2021	25.8% (1st)	26.0% (1st)	24.2% (1st)
Average			22.2%	23.2%	20.6%
Special	Part 1	April 3, 2021	6.5% (13th)	7.6% (8th)	N/A
Special	Part 2	April 3, 2021	9.8% (3rd)	10.6% (3rd)	N/A
The blue numbers represent the lowest ratings and the red numbers represent the highest ratings.: N/A denotes ratings that were not published.

Average TV viewership ratings (season 3)
Ep.	Part	Original broadcast date	Average audience share		
Ep.	Part	Original broadcast date	Nielsen Korea		TNmS
Ep.	Part	Original broadcast date	Nationwide	Seoul	Nationwide
1	1	June 4, 2021	16.9% (3rd)	17.6% (3rd)	15.6% (3rd)
1	2	June 4, 2021	19.5% (1st)	21.0% (1st)	16.8% (1st)
1	3	June 4, 2021	19.1% (2nd)	20.2% (2nd)	15.3% (4th)
2	1	June 11, 2021	15.2% (4th)	15.8% (3rd)	13.5% (5th)
2	2	June 11, 2021	17.5% (1st)	18.4% (2nd)	15.1% (4th)
2	3	June 11, 2021	17.5% (1st)	18.5% (1st)	15.1% (3rd)
3	1	June 18, 2021	14.4% (5th)	15.4% (3rd)	12.9% (5th)
3	2	June 18, 2021	16.3% (2nd)	17.2% (2nd)	14.4% (4th)
3	3	June 18, 2021	17.5% (1st)	18.6% (1st)	15.8% (1st)
4	1	June 25, 2021	14.9% (5th)	15.4% (3rd)	13.5% (5th)
4	2	June 25, 2021	17.0% (2nd)	17.9% (1st)	15.3% (3rd)
4	3	June 25, 2021	17.1% (1st)	17.9% (1st)	15.7% (2nd)
5		July 2, 2021	16.5% (1st)	17.4% (1st)	15.0% (2nd)
6		July 9, 2021	16.7% (1st)	17.4% (1st)	15.5% (1st)
7		July 16, 2021	17.5% (1st)	18.7% (1st)	15.5% (1st)
8		July 30, 2021	15.7% (1st)	16.3% (1st)	14.8% (1st)
9		August 6, 2021	15.5% (1st)	16.9% (1st)	14.7% (1st)
10		August 13, 2021	18.8% (1st)	19.4% (1st)	17.8% (1st)
11		August 20, 2021	18.4% (1st)	18.2% (1st)	17.8% (1st)
12		August 27, 2021	17.5% (1st)	18.4% (1st)	15.5% (2nd)
13		September 3, 2021	17.9% (1st)	18.7% (1st)	16.0% (2nd)
14		September 10, 2021	19.1% (1st)	19.4% (1st)	N/A
Average			17.1%	17.9%	15.65%
Special 1	Part 1	June 2, 2021	N/A	N/A	N/A
Special 1	Part 2	June 2, 2021	N/A	4.1% (20th)	N/A
Special 2		September 18, 2021	N/A		
The blue numbers represent the lowest ratings and the red numbers represent the highest ratings.; N/A denotes ratings that were not published.

=== Criticism ===
The Penthouse series was ranked the second worst of 2021 with 43 votes from 200 industry experts due to the ridiculous ending of Season 3 and criticized for its scattered storyline and inconsequential events, while being praised for the actors performances.

== Awards and nominations ==
Name of the award ceremony, year presented, category, nominee of the award, and the result of the nomination
Award ceremony	Year	Category	Nominee	Result	Ref.
APAN Star Awards	2022	Top Excellence Award, Actor in a Serial Drama	Um Ki-joon	Nominated	
APAN Star Awards	2022	Top Excellence Award, Actress in a Serial Drama	Kim So-yeon	Nominated	
Baeksang Arts Awards	2021	Best Actress – Television	Kim So-yeon	Won	
Baeksang Arts Awards	2021	Best Actor – Television	Um Ki-joon	Nominated	
Baeksang Arts Awards	2021	Best New Actor – Television	Kim Young-dae	Nominated	
Baeksang Arts Awards	2021	Best New Actress – Television	Kim Hyun-soo	Nominated	
Baeksang Arts Awards	2021	Best Supporting Actress – Television	Shin Eun-kyung	Nominated	
Grimae Awards	2021	Best Actor	Um Ki-joon	Won	
Grimae Awards	2021	Best Actress	Kim So-yeon	Won	
Grimae Awards	2021	Grand Prize (Daesang)	The Penthouse: War in Life 2 and 3	Won	
SBS Drama Awards	2020	Best Supporting Actor	Park Eun-seok	Won	
SBS Drama Awards	2020	Best Young Actress	Kim Hyun-soo	Won	
SBS Drama Awards	2020	Excellence Award, Actor in a Mid-Length/Long Drama	Bong Tae-gyu	Won	
SBS Drama Awards	2020	Excellence Award, Actor in a Mid-Length/Long Drama	Yoon Jong-hoon	Won	
SBS Drama Awards	2020	Excellence Award, Actress in a Mid-Length/Long Drama	Shin Eun-kyung	Won	
SBS Drama Awards	2020	Top Excellence Award, Actor in a Mid-Length/Long Drama	Um Ki-joon	Won	
SBS Drama Awards	2020	Top Excellence Award, Actress in a Mid-Length/Long Drama	Eugene	Won	
SBS Drama Awards	2020	Top Excellence Award, Actress in a Mid-Length/Long Drama	Kim So-yeon	Won	
SBS Drama Awards	2020	Top Excellence Award, Actress in a Mid-Length/Long Drama	Lee Ji-ah	Won	
SBS Drama Awards	2020	Best Supporting Actress	Yoon Joo-hee	Nominated	
SBS Drama Awards	2020	Best Supporting Team	The Penthouse: War in Life	Nominated	
SBS Drama Awards	2020	Best New Actor	Ha Do-kwon	Nominated	
SBS Drama Awards	2020	Best New Actor	Kim Young-dae	Nominated	
SBS Drama Awards	2020	Best New Actress	Jo Soo-min	Nominated	
SBS Drama Awards	2020	Grand Prize (Daesang)	Kim So-yeon	Nominated	
SBS Drama Awards	2021	Best New Actor	Kim Young-dae	Won	
SBS Drama Awards	2021	Best New Actress	Han Ji-hyun	Won	
SBS Drama Awards	2021	Best New Actress	Choi Ye-bin	Won	
SBS Drama Awards	2021	Grand Prize (Daesang)	Kim So-yeon	Won	
SBS Drama Awards	2021	Lifetime Achievement Award	Kim Soon-ok	Won	
SBS Drama Awards	2021	Best Character Award, Actor	On Joo-wan	Nominated	
SBS Drama Awards	2021	Best Couple Award	Uhm Ki-joon & Kim So-yeon	Nominated	
SBS Drama Awards	2021	Excellence Award for an Actor in a Mini-Series Genre/Fantasy Drama	Park Eun-seok	Nominated	
SBS Drama Awards	2021	Excellence Award for an Actress in a Mini-Series Genre/Fantasy Drama	Yoon Joo-hee	Nominated	
SBS Drama Awards	2021	Scene Stealer Award	Jung Ah-mi	Nominated	
SBS Drama Awards	2021	Top Excellence Award, Actor in a Miniseries Genre/Fantasy Drama	Uhm Ki-joon	Nominated	
SBS Drama Awards	2021	Top Excellence Award, Actress in a Miniseries Genre/Fantasy Drama	Kim So-yeon	Nominated	
SBS Drama Awards	2021	Top Excellence Award, Actress in a Miniseries Genre/Fantasy Drama	Lee Ji-ah	Nominated	
SBS Drama Awards	2021	Top Excellence Award, Actress in a Miniseries Genre/Fantasy Drama	Eugene	Nominated	
Seoul International Drama Awards	2021	Best Serial Drama (International)	The Penthouse: War in Life (Studio S)	Won	
Seoul International Drama Awards	2021	Best Actress (International)	Kim So-yeon	Nominated	
Seoul International Drama Awards	2021	Best Director (International)	Joo Dong-min	Nominated	
Seoul International Drama Awards	2021	Best Screenwriter (International)	Kim Soon-ok	Nominated	
Seoul International Drama Awards	2021	Outstanding Korean Drama	The Penthouse: War in Life	Nominated	
Seoul International Drama Awards	2021	Outstanding Korean Drama (Actress)	Kim So-yeon	Nominated	
