= Oh Yeon-seo =

South Korean actress (born 1987)

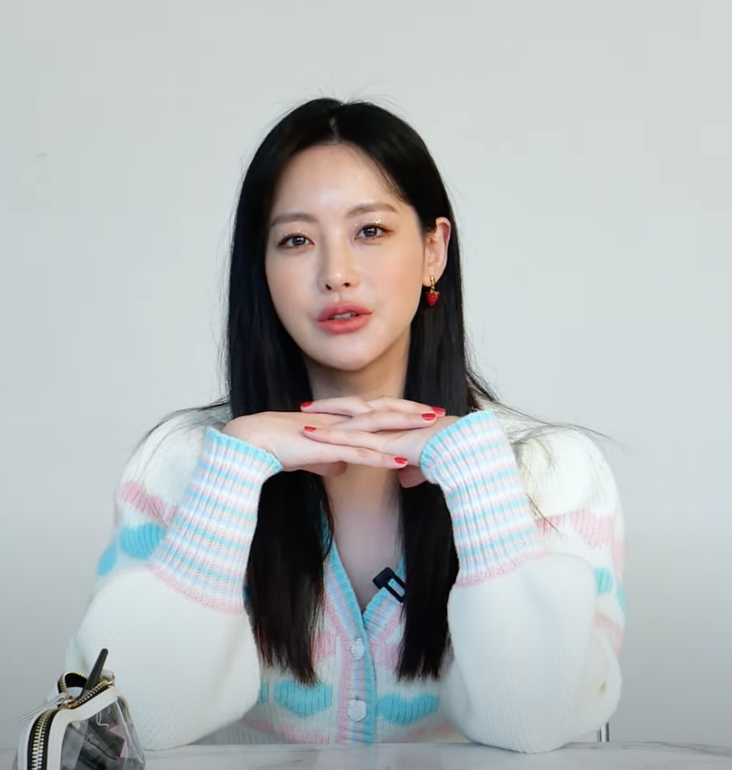
- Oh in April 2021
- Born: Oh Haet-nim; June 22, 1987 (age 39); Jinju, South Korea
- Education: Dongguk University
- Occupations: Actress; singer
- Years active: 2002–present
- Agent: Story J Company
- Height: 170 cm (5 ft 7 in)
- Musical career
- Also known as: Haetnim
- Genres: K-pop; dance-pop
- Instrument: Vocals
- Years active: 2002–2003
- Label: SidusHQ
- Formerly of: Luv

Korean name
- Hangul: 오햇님
- RR: O Haetnim
- MR: O Haennim

Stage name
- Hangul: 오연서
- RR: O Yeonseo
- MR: O Yŏnsŏ
- Website: storyjcompany.com

Oh Haet-nim (Korean: 오햇님, born June 22, 1987), known professionally as Oh Yeon-seo (Korean: 오연서), is a South Korean actress and former singer. She is a former member of the musical group Luv, and as an actress she is best known for her roles in television dramas My Husband Got a Family (2012), Jang Bo-ri is Here! (2014), Shine or Go Crazy (2015), Come Back Mister (2016), My Sassy Girl (2017), A Korean Odyssey (2017–2018), Love with Flaws (2019–2020), Mad for Each Other (2021), and Café Minamdang (2022).

== Early life ==
Oh was born in Jinju, South Gyeongsang Province and grew up in Changnyeong County. In the second year of middle school, Oh followed a group of friends to an audition for SM Entertainment, held in Daegu, but was rejected. However, another company contacted her saying that she had qualified and she moved to Seoul, debuting four months later at the age of 15.

Oh was accepted into Anyang Arts High School after her band's disbandment and went on to become an actress. She changed her name from Haet-nim to Yeon-seo after consulting a shaman with her mother.

Oh then entered Dongguk University, joining the theater and film department.

== Career ==
=== Beginnings ===
Oh Yeon-seo made her entertainment debut in 2002 when she was 15-years-old under her birth name Oh Haet-nim, with the SidusHQ-managed band Luv. They released their first album, Story, with the singles "Orange Girl" and "I Still Believe in You". The band was short-lived and disbanded six months later. Oh then shifted to acting and made her debut appearance in the 2003 drama Sharp, but remained unknown.

=== 2012–2013: Rising popularity ===
Though she had a major role in the 2009 film A Blood Pledge, it wasn't until she was cast in the family drama My Husband Got a Family (2012) that she gained recognition. She then joined the popular variety program We Got Married alongside MBLAQ's Lee Joon. Towards the end of 2012, Oh was cast in daily drama Here Comes Mr. Oh where she had her first lead role.

In 2013, Oh played a thoracic resident surgeon in medical drama Medical Top Team. She was appointed an ambassador for the first annual Animal Film Festival in Suncheon along with Kim Min-jun and Kal So-won to help raise awareness for animal rights and welfare in August. Oh was also appointed a Red Cross Ambassador together with actor Ryu Soo-young.

=== 2014–present: Breakthrough and critical acclaim ===
Oh played the lead role of Jang Bo-ri, a compassionate and selfless person, in the highly acclaimed series Jang Bo-ri is Here! (2014). The drama's ratings peaked at 40.4%, and led to a surge in popularity for Oh. She had a hard time playing the character as she grew up in Gyeongsang-do but her character had to speak the Jeolla-do dialect, which she had never used in her entire life.

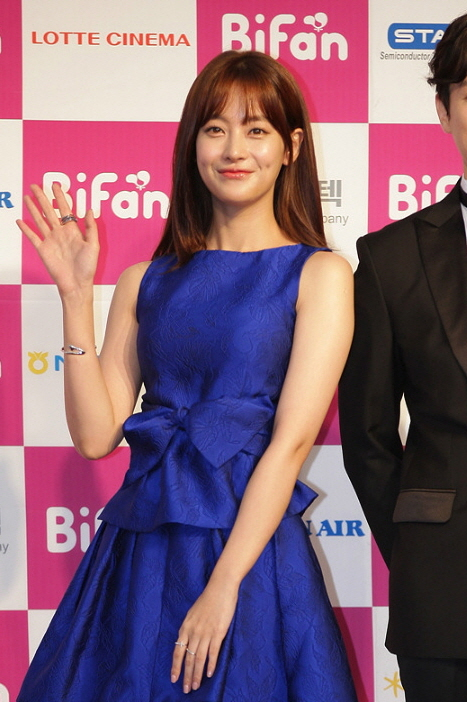
Oh in July 2015

In 2015, Oh played Shin Yool, the last princess of Balhae, in the historical drama Shine or Go Crazy, co-starring Jang Hyuk. The series was a modest hit, and topped ratings in its timeslot throughout its run.

Oh then starred alongside Rain in the SBS drama Come Back Mister, which aired from February to April 2016. She played Han Hong-nan, a male character reincarnated in a female's body. Oh was praised for her chemistry with co-star Lee Ha-nui, whom she has acted with in her previous project Shine or Go Crazy. She also impressed viewers through her comedic portrayal of her masculine role. The same year, she starred in Take Off 2, the sequel to the 2009 movie Take Off where she plays a member of the first South Korean woman's national ice hockey team.

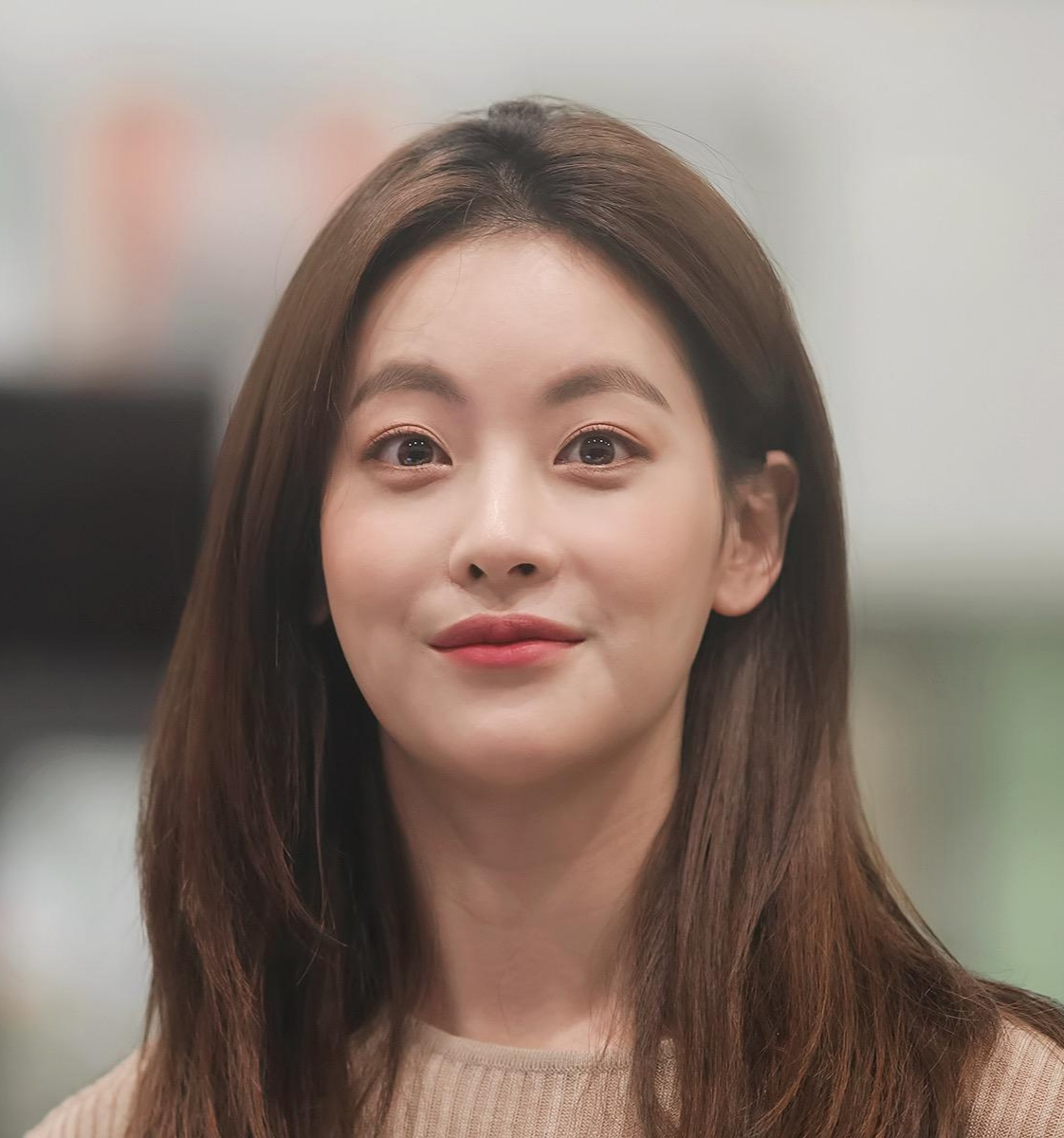
Oh in August 2017

In 2017, Oh starred in the historical drama remake of the 2001 box office hit My Sassy Girl alongside Joo Won. In August 2017, Oh signed with new management agency Celltrion Entertainment. The same year, she was cast in tvN's fantasy romantic comedy/tragedy drama A Korean Odyssey, written by the Hong sisters.

In 2018, Oh starred in the film adaptation of the Cheese in the Trap alongside Park Hae-jin, who also played the role of Yoo Jung in the drama.

In 2019, Oh was cast in the romantic comedy drama Love with Flaws. In October 2019, Oh re-signed with SidusHQ.

In 2021, Oh was cast in the web drama Mad for Each Other which premiered on May 24 alongside Jung Woo. Later in November 2021, Oh officially signed with Story J Company.

In 2022, she was cast in Café Minamdang as Han Jae-hui, a third-year homicide detective, alongside Seo In-guk. Oh returned to the big screen with the film Men of Plastic, released on November 30, 2022, alongside Ma Dong-seok, Jung Kyung-ho and Oh Na-ra.

== Personal life ==
=== Relationship ===
On March 29, 2018, it was confirmed that Oh was in a relationship with actor Kim Bum. However, after a few months of dating they were reported to have parted ways.

== Accolades ==
=== Awards and nominations ===
Name of the award ceremony, year presented, category, nominee of the award, and the result of the nomination
Award ceremony	Year	Category	Nominee / Work	Result	Ref.
APAN Star Awards	2012	Rising Star Award	My Husband Got a Family	Won	
APAN Star Awards	2013	Popular Star Award	Here Comes Mr. Oh	Won	
APAN Star Awards	2016	Acting Award, Actress	Come Back Mister	Nominated	
Asia Model Awards	2009	CF Model Award	Oh Yeon-seo	Won	
Asia Model Awards	2016	Popularity Award (Female)	Come Back Mister	Won	
Blue Dragon Series Awards	2022	Best Leading Actress	Mad for Each Other	Nominated	
KBS Drama Awards	2012	Best New Actress	My Husband Got a Family	Won	
KBS Drama Awards	2022	Excellence Award, Actress in a Miniseries	Café Minamdang	Nominated	
KBS Drama Awards	2022	Best Couple Award	Oh Yeon-seo (with Seo In-guk); Café Minamdang	Won	
Korea Drama Awards	2012	Best New Actress	My Husband Got a Family	Nominated	
Korea Drama Awards	2014	Top Excellence Award, Actress	Jang Bo-ri is Here!	Won	
MBC Drama Awards	2012	Best New Actress	Here Comes Mr. Oh	Won	
MBC Drama Awards	2014	Grand Prize (Daesang)	Jang Bo-ri is Here!	Nominated	
MBC Drama Awards	2014	Top Excellence Award, Actress in a Serial Drama	Jang Bo-ri is Here!	Won	
MBC Drama Awards	2019	Top Excellence Award, Actress in a Wednesday-Thursday Miniseries	Love with Flaws	Nominated	
SBS Drama Awards	2016	Excellence Award, Actress in a Fantasy Drama	Come Back Mister	Won	
SBS Drama Awards	2017	Top Excellence Award, Actress in a Monday–Tuesday Drama	My Sassy Girl	Nominated	

=== Listicles ===
Name of publisher, year listed, name of listicle, and placement
Publisher	Year	Listicle	Rank	Ref.
Forbes	2013	Korea Power Celebrity 40	28th	
