= Jang Bo-ri Is Here! =

2014 South Korean television series

- Promotional poster
- Also known as: Come! Jang Bo-ri
- Hangul: 왔다! 장보리
- RR: Watda! Jang Bori
- MR: Watta! Chang Pori
- Genre: Romance; Family; Comedy; Melodrama
- Written by: Kim Soon-ok
- Directed by: Baek Ho-min
- Starring: Oh Yeon-seo; Kim Ji-hoon; Lee Yu-ri; Oh Chang-seok
- Music by: Gaemi
- Country of origin: South Korea
- Original language: Korean
- No. of episodes: 52

Production
- Executive producer: Lee Chang-sub
- Producer: Lee Myung-sook
- Production companies: Jidam Inc. (formerly Yein E&M)

Original release
- Network: MBC
- Release: January 5 – November 21, 2014

Jang Bo-ri Is Here! (Korean: 왔다! 장보리) is a 2014 South Korean weekend television drama series broadcast by MBC starring Oh Yeon-seo, Kim Ji-hoon, Lee Yu-ri and Oh Chang-seok. It premiered on April 5, 2014, airing every Saturday and Sunday at 20:40 for 52 episodes. It won Drama of the Year at the 2014 MBC Drama Awards.

== Synopsis ==
The events center around a renowned Hanbok-making house called Bi Sool Chae. The Master Artisan of Bi Sool Chae, Kim Soo-Mi, focuses on preserving the traditions of Hanbok-making, including hand-dyeing and hand-sewing each garment.

The Master Artisan lives with her two married sons in her traditional Korean estate. Her two daughters-in-law have been her apprentices for a long time. When the time comes for the Artisan to choose her successor, the fierce competition between the two daughters-in-law results in tragedies that reverberate for decades afterwards.

== Cast ==
=== Main characters ===
- Oh Yeon-seo as Jang Bo-ri/Jang Eun-bi
  - Yoo Eun-mi as young Bo -ri
- Kim Ji-hoon as Lee Jae-hwa
  - Jung Yoon-seok as young Jae-hwa
- Lee Yu-ri as Yeon Min-jung
  - Shin Soo-yeon as young Min-jung
- Oh Chang-seok as Lee Jae-hee
  - Jo Hyun-do as young Jae-hee

=== Supporting characters ===
- Kim Yong-rim as Park Soo-mi
- Kim Hye-ok as Kim In-hwa
- Yang Mi-kyung as Song Ok-soo
- Ahn Nae-sang as Jang Soo-bong
- Han Jin-hee as Lee Dong-hoo
- Geum Bo-ra as Lee Hwa-yeon
- Woo Hee-jin as Lee Jung-ran
- Han Seung-yeon as Lee Ga-eul
- Jang Won-jong as Jang Hee-bong (cameo)
- Hwang Young-hee as Do Hye-ok
- Park Geon-il as Kang Yoo-chun
- Choi Dae-chul as Kang Nae-chun
- Jeon In-chul as Park Jong-ha
- Kim Ji-young as Do Bi-dan
- Sung Hyuk as Moon Ji-sang
- Oh Seung-ah as Choi Yoo Ra
- Lee Dong-ha as Hyeon-chae

== Awards and nominations ==
Year	Award	Category	Recipient	Result
2014	7th Korea Drama Awards	Top Excellence Award, Actress	Oh Yeon-seo	Won
2014	7th Korea Drama Awards	Best Screenplay	Kim Soon-ok	Nominated
2014	7th Korea Drama Awards	Best Young Actor/Actress	Kim Ji-young	Won
2014	3rd APAN Star Awards	Top Excellence Award, Actress in a Serial Drama	Lee Yoo-ri	Nominated
2014	3rd APAN Star Awards	Excellence Award, Actor in a Serial Drama	Kim Ji-hoon	Won
2014	3rd APAN Star Awards	Excellence Award, Actress in a Serial Drama	Oh Yeon-seo	Nominated
2014	22nd Korea Culture and Entertainment Awards	Top Excellence Award, Actor in a Drama	Kim Ji-hoon	Won
2014	22nd Korea Culture and Entertainment Awards	Best New Actor in a Drama	Sung Hyuk	Won
2014	MBC Drama Awards	Grand Prize / Daesang (Determined through fan votes)	Lee Yoo-ri	Won
2014	MBC Drama Awards	Grand Prize / Daesang (Determined through fan votes)	Oh Yeon-seo	Nominated
2014	MBC Drama Awards	Drama of the Year	Jang Bo-ri Is Here!	Won
2014	MBC Drama Awards	Top Excellence Award, Actor in a Serial Drama	Kim Ji-hoon	Won
2014	MBC Drama Awards	Top Excellence Award, Actress in a Serial Drama	Oh Yeon-seo	Won
2014	MBC Drama Awards	Top Excellence Award, Actress in a Serial Drama	Lee Yoo-ri	Nominated
2014	MBC Drama Awards	Excellence Award, Actor in a Serial Drama	Oh Chang-seok	Nominated
2014	MBC Drama Awards	Golden Acting Award, Actor	Ahn Nae-sang	Won
2014	MBC Drama Awards	Golden Acting Award, Actress	Kim Hye-ok	Won
2014	MBC Drama Awards	Best Young Actress	Kim Ji-young	Won
2014	MBC Drama Awards	PD Award	Lee Yoo-ri	Won
2014	MBC Drama Awards	Writer of the Year	Kim Soon-ok	Won
2014	MBC Drama Awards	Popularity Award, Actress	Lee Yoo-ri	Nominated
2014	MBC Drama Awards	Best Couple Award	Kim Ji-hoon and Oh Yeon-seo	Nominated
2015	51st Baeksang Arts Awards	Best Actress (TV)	Lee Yoo-ri	Nominated

== Remake ==
- Vietnam - This series is remade in Vietnam as Hạnh phúc bị đánh cắp, aired on VieOn on August 19, 2024.

== See also ==
- List of South Korean dramas
