= Heart Surgeons =

2018 South Korean television series

- Promotional poster
- Also known as: Two Lives One Heart; Thoracic Surgery; Cardiothoracic Surgery
- Hangul: 흉부외과: 심장을 훔친 의사들
- Hanja: 胸部外科: 心臟을 훔친 醫師들
- Lit.: Thoracic Surgery: Doctors Who Stole Your Heart
- RR: Hyungbuoegwa: simjangeul humchin uisadeul
- MR: Hyungbuoekwa: simjangŭl humch'in ŭisadŭl
- Genre: Medical drama
- Created by: Park Young-soo (SBS)
- Written by: Choi Soo-jin; Choi Chang-hwan
- Directed by: Jo Young-kwang
- Starring: Go Soo; Um Ki-joon; Seo Ji-hye
- Country of origin: South Korea
- Original language: Korean
- No. of episodes: 32 (Note: In order to circumvent Korean laws that prevent commercial breaks in the middle of an episode, what would previously have been aired as single 70 minute episodes are now being repackaged as two 35 minute episodes, with two episodes being shown each night with a commercial break between the two.)

Production
- Producers: Lee Sang-min; Park Hyung-ki
- Camera setup: Single-camera
- Running time: 35 minutes
- Production company: The Story Works

Original release
- Network: SBS TV
- Release: September 27 – November 15, 2018

Heart Surgeons (Korean: 흉부외과: 심장을 훔친 의사들) is a 2018 South Korean television series starring Go Soo, Um Ki-joon, and Seo Ji-hye. It aired on SBS TV from September 27 to November 15, 2018, every Wednesday and Thursday at 22:00 (KST) for 32 episodes.

== Synopsis ==
The series revolves around the thoracic surgery department of a hospital.

== Cast ==
=== Main ===
- Go Soo as Park Tae-soo, a thoracic surgery fellow for four years whose mother is waiting for a heart transplant.
- Um Ki-joon as Choi Suk-han, a thoracic surgeon who is renowned for his skills but has not been treated fairly due to his humble medical background from a local university.
- Seo Ji-hye as Yoon Soo-yeon, a thoracic surgical assistant. Also the daughter of the director of Taesan hospital, the main setting for this drama.

=== Supporting ===
- Kim Ye-won as Ahn Ji-na, a cardiology fellow and Soo-yeon's friend .
- Jeong Bo-seok as Yoon Hyun-il, Soo-yeon's uncle and the chief of surgery.
- Nam Kyung-eup as Yoon Hyun-mok, Soo-yeon's father who is a hospital director and a genius pediatric heart surgeon.
- Ahn Nae-sang as Goo Hee-dong
- Jang So-yeon as Kang Eun-sook, a veteran nurse with over twenty years of experience in surgery.
- Choi Dae-hoon as Goo Dong-joon
- Jung Hee-tae as Lee Dae-young
- Park Kyung-hye as Lee Seon-young
- Lee Jae-won as Nam Woo-jin
- Oh Dong-min as Moon Seung-jae
- Nam Tae-boo as Lee Mi-ran
- Jung Yoo-min as Bae Yoo-ri, a scrub nurse.
- Cha Soon-bae as Lee Joong-do
- Son Kwang-eop as Son Jae-myung
- Jung Hyun-suk as Head Department Yoo
- Lee Duck-hee as Oh Jeong-ae, Tae-soo's mother.
- Jo Jae-yoon as Hwang Jin-cheol
- Seo Ha as Lee Ye-rin

=== Special appearances ===
- Woo Hyun as Han Sang-wok
- Shim Yi-young as Choi Seok-han's wife
- Jo Jae-ryong as Hwang Jin-chul
- Kim Min-seok as Surgeon (Ep 32)
- Shin Rin-ah as Lee Yoon-Seo

== Production ==
- Writers Choi Soo-jin and Choi Chang-hwan and director Jo Young-kwang previously worked together on the 2017 TV series Innocent Defendant, along with Um Ki-joon as one of the lead stars.
- The first script reading with the cast was held in early August 2018.

== Ratings ==
Ep.	Broadcast date	Average audience share		
Ep.	Broadcast date	TNmS	Nielsen Korea	
Ep.	Broadcast date	Nationwide	Nationwide	Seoul
1	September 27, 2018 (Note: Episodes 1 to 4 aired back-to-back due to the broadcast of the film Along with the Gods: The Last 49 Days the previous day.)	7.3%	6.9% (13th)	7.6% (10th)
2	September 27, 2018	7.7%	7.5% (9th)	8.1% (9th)
3	September 27, 2018	7.2%	6.2% (19th)	6.7% (15th)
4	September 27, 2018	6.9%	6.5% (17th)	6.9% (14th)
5	October 3, 2018	6.8%	6.8% (15th)	7.2% (12th)
6	October 3, 2018	8.0%	8.5% (8th)	8.8% (5th)
7	October 4, 2018	8.0%	6.9% (13th)	7.2% (12th)
8	October 4, 2018	9.0%	8.4% (9th)	8.6% (6th)
9	October 10, 2018	5.9%	5.8% (19th)	6.1% (18th)
10	October 10, 2018	7.3%	7.0% (14th)	7.3% (10th)
11	October 11, 2018	6.9%	7.4% (12th)	7.8% (11th)
12	October 11, 2018	7.5%	8.3% (9th)	8.5% (6th)
13	October 17, 2018	6.2%	5.7% (19th)	6.3% (19th)
14	October 17, 2018	7.0%	6.9% (13th)	7.9% (7th)
15	October 18, 2018	7.6%	7.2% (14th)	7.9% (12th)
16	October 18, 2018	8.3%	8.8% (9th)	9.7% (6th)
17	October 24, 2018	6.2%	5.7% (20th)	6.3% (18th)
18	October 24, 2018	7.1%	7.0% (14th)	7.7% (9th)
19	October 25, 2018	7.6%	6.7% (14th)	7.1% (12th)
20	October 25, 2018	7.7%	7.5% (11th)	8.0% (9th)
21	October 31, 2018	6.0%	6.5% (17th)	6.2% (18th)
22	October 31, 2018	6.6%	8.1% (11th)	7.5% (14th)
23	November 1, 2018	6.7%	7.6% (14th)	8.5% (13th)
24	November 1, 2018	7.0%	8.4% (13th)	9.6% (7th)
25	November 7, 2018	6.1%	5.8% (NR)	6.3% (19th)
26	November 7, 2018	7.4%	7.1% (13th)	7.8% (11th)
27	November 8, 2018	N/A	6.4% (17th)	7.5% (14th)
28	November 8, 2018	N/A	7.5% (14th)	8.8% (12th)
29	November 14, 2018	N/A	5.8% (NR)	6.6% (18th)
30	November 14, 2018	6.4%	7.3% (14th)	8.3% (9th)
31	November 15, 2018	7.4%	7.8% (14th)	8.9% (8th)
32	November 15, 2018	7.9%	8.4% (11th)	9.4% (9th)
Average		— (Note: Due to some unpublished ratings, the exact average rating is unknown.)	7.1%	7.7%
In the table above, the blue numbers represent the lowest ratings and the red numbers represent the highest ratings.; NR denotes that the drama did not rank in the top 20 daily programs on that date.; N/A denotes that the rating is not known.

== Awards and nominations ==
Year	Award	Category	Nominee	Result	Ref.
2018	SBS Drama Awards	Top Excellence Award, Actor in a Wednesday-Thursday Drama	Go Soo	Nominated	
2018	SBS Drama Awards	Excellence Award, Actress in a Wednesday-Thursday Drama	Uhm Ki-joon	Nominated	
2018	SBS Drama Awards	Excellence Award, Actress in a Wednesday-Thursday Drama	Seo Ji-hye	Won	
2018	SBS Drama Awards	Best Supporting Actor	Choi Dae-hoon	Nominated	
2018	SBS Drama Awards	Best Supporting Actress	Park Kyung-hye	Nominated	
2018	SBS Drama Awards	Producer's Award for Actor	Uhm Ki-joon	Won	
