= Yoon Jong-hoon =

South Korean actor (born 1984)

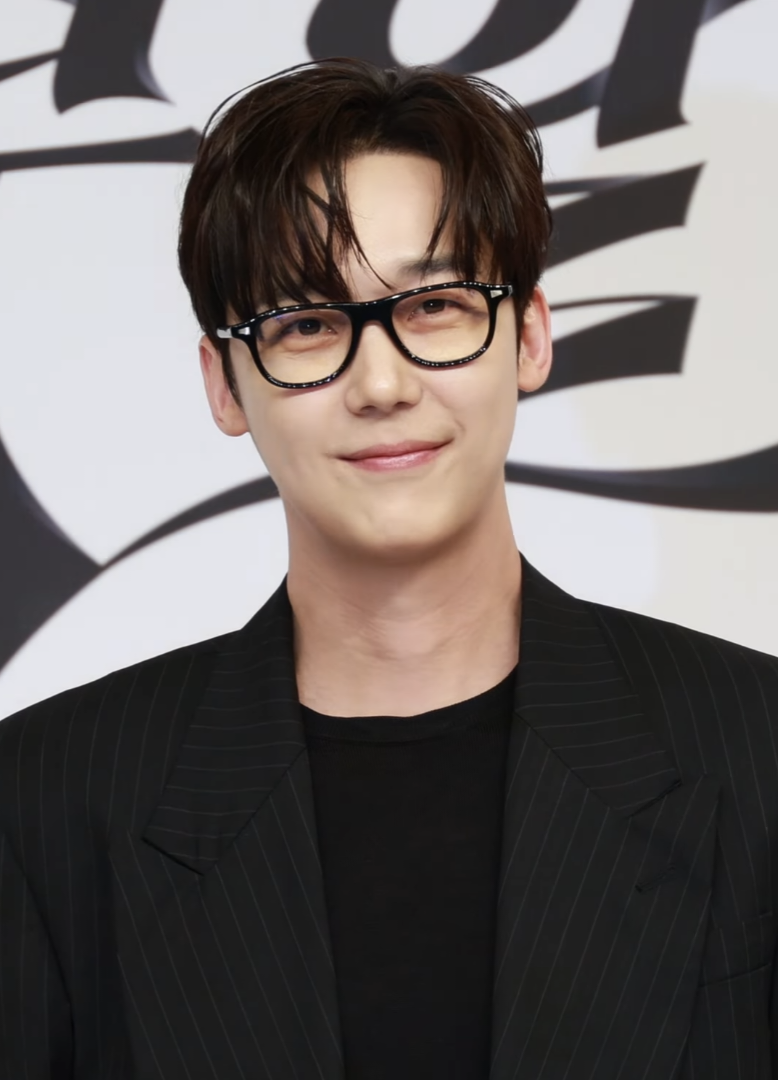
- Yoon in March 2024
- Born: February 15, 1984 (age 42); Daejeon, South Chungcheong Province, South Korea
- Occupation: Actor
- Years active: 2006–present

Korean name
- Hangul: 윤종훈
- Hanja: 尹鐘焄
- RR: Yun Jonghun
- MR: Yun Chonghun

Yoon Jong-hoon (Korean: 윤종훈; born February 15, 1984) is a South Korean actor.

== Filmography ==
=== Film ===
Year	Title	Role	Notes	Ref.
2010	Frozen Land	Byeong-jo	Short film	
2010	Kidney Seed		Short film	
2012	Suddenly Last Summer			
2022	It's Alright		TVING Shorts Film	

=== Television series ===
Year	Title	Role	Notes	Ref.
2009	Empress Cheonchu		martial arts team	
2009	The Return of Iljimae		martial arts team	
2010	Golden Fish			
2013	KBS Drama Special: "Sirius"	Eun Chang's friend	Cameo (Episode 1)	
2013	Monstar	Shin Jae-rok		
2013	Reply 1994	Kim Ki-tae		
2014	Emergency Couple	Im Yong-gyu		
2014	Her Lovely Heels	Choi Yeon-ho		
2014	Only Love	Kim Woo-joo		
2014	Misaeng: Incomplete Life	Lee Sang-hyun		
2014	Dr. Frost	Kang Jin-wook		
2015–2016	Riders: Catch Tomorrow	Kim Joon-Wook		
2015	Unkind Ladies	Jung Go Min (young)	Cameo	
2015	A Daughter Just Like You	Baek Seon-jae		
2016	Marrying My Daughter Twice	Choi Yong-jun		
2016	One More Happy Ending	Dong Mi's ex-boyfriend	Cameo (Episode 7)	
2016	Another Miss Oh	Choi Noo-ri	Cameo (Episode 2–3)	
2016	Let's Make a New Start	Lee Sun-ho		
2016	Hello, My Twenties!	Seo Dong-joo		
2017	The Bride of Habaek	Ma Bong-yeol	Cameo (Episode 1–2, 12)	
2017	The King in Love	Wang Jeon		
2018	Return	Seo Joon-hee		
2018	Come and Hug Me	Gil Moo-won		
2018–2019	My Healing Love	Park Wan-sung		
2018–2019	The Last Empress	Terrorist, Kang Joo Seung's brother	Cameo (Episode 1–2)	
2019	Rookie Historian Goo Hae-ryung	Prince Huiyeong Yi Kyeom/Ho Dam	Cameo (Episode 32–36, 39–40)	
2019	Extraordinary You	Lee Jo-hwa		
2020	Find Me in Your Memory	Yoo Tae-eun		
2020	Timing	Kim Bo-seok		
2020–2021	The Penthouse: War in Life	Ha Yoon-cheol	Season 1–3	
2022	Shooting Stars	Kang Yoo-seong		
2023–2024	The Escape of the Seven	Yang Jin-mo		
2026	Siren's Kiss	Choi Young-ho	Special appearances	
2026	Our Happy Days	Goo Gyeol		

=== Web series ===
Year	Title	Role	Ref.
2017	The Best Moment To Quit Your Job	Dae Woon	

=== Television shows ===
Year	Title	Role	Notes	Ref.
2012–2013	All About Trend TM	Host		
2021	My Little Old Boy	Special Host	Episode 228	
2021	We Don't Bite: Villains in the Countryside	Cast Member	with Um Ki-joon and Bong Tae-gyu	

=== Music video appearances ===
Year	Song title	Artist
2012	"She's Leaving"	Lee Jong-sup
2013	"Love Story"	Go Hyun-wook
2014	"Flower Vase"	Yang Hee-eun ft. Lee Juck

== Theater ==
Year	title	Role
2009	Jewelry Bridge	Ryo
2010	Le Bagne (The Penal Colony)	
2012	Life	Lee Kwan-sul

== Awards and nominations ==
Name of the award ceremony, year presented, category, nominee of the award, and the result of the nomination
Award ceremony	Year	Category	Nominee / Work	Result	Ref.
MBC Drama Awards	2015	Best New Actor in a Serial Drama	A Daughter Just Like You	Nominated	
MBC Drama Awards	2018	Excellence Award, Actor in a Soap Opera	My Healing Love	Nominated	
MBC Drama Awards	2020	Excellence Award, Actor in a Wednesday-Thursday Miniseries	Find Me in Your Memory	Nominated	
SBS Drama Awards	2018	Best New Actor	Return	Nominated	
SBS Drama Awards	2018	Best Character	Return	Won	
SBS Drama Awards	2020	Excellence Award, Actor in a Mid-Length Drama	The Penthouse: War in Life	Won	
