= Killer Toon =

- Official poster
- Directed by: Kim Yong-gyun
- Written by: Lee Sang-hak
- Produced by: Lee Sang-hak; Han Man-taek; Jeong Yong-ki
- Starring: Lee Si-young; Um Ki-joon
- Cinematography: Lee Jung-bae
- Edited by: Kim Mi-ju
- Music by: Choi Yong-rak
- Production companies: Filma Pictures; Line Film; CJ Entertainment
- Distributed by: CJ Entertainment
- Release date: June 27, 2013
- Running time: 104 minutes
- Country: South Korea
- Language: Korean
- Box office: US$7.6 million

Killer Toon (Korean: 더 웹툰: 예고살인; RR: Deo weptun: yegosarin) is a 2013 South Korean psychological horror film directed by Kim Yong-gyun, and starring Lee Si-young and Um Ki-joon.

The film was successful at the box office, as it was the first South Korean horror film to sell more than one million cinema tickets since Death Bell in 2008.

== Plot ==
A popular horror webtoon artist Kang Ji-yoon (Lee Si-young) finds life imitating her own work when her publisher turns up dead in a gruesome way, precisely mirrors the images in her latest comic. After a series of murders are connected to her webtoon, a private detective Lee Ki-cheol (Um Ki-joon) places Ji-Yoon on the list of suspects.

== Cast ==
- Lee Si-young as Kang Ji-yoon
- Um Ki-joon as Lee Ki-cheol
- Hyun Woo as Kim Young-soo
- Moon Ka-young as Jo Seo-hyun
- Kwon Hae-hyo as Jo Seon-gi
- Kim Do-young as Seo Mi-sook
- Kim Hae-eun as Detective Yeo
- Kim So-yeon as Mi-jin
- Oh Yoon-hong as Seon-gi's wife
- Lee Do-yeob as coroner
- Kim Ji-young as young Seo-hyun
- Oh Kwang-rok as chief detective
- Kim So-hyun as young Mi-sook
- Lee Yong-nyeo as female doctor Jin-kyung
- Seo Jin-won as editor-in-chief
- Lee Sang-hoon as internet reporter 1

== Release ==
Killer Toon was released in South Korea on June 27, 2013, and was financially successful on its release. By July 15, 2013, the film grossed ₩7.79 billion (US$6.93 million). In comparison, other South Korean horror films from that year, namely Doctor and The Puppet made ₩495 million (US$441,000) and ₩228 million (US$203,000) on 68,222 and 31,713 admissions, respectively. The film debuted at second place in the South Korean box office, only being beaten by the Hollywood film World War Z.
