= 2017 SBS Drama Awards =

25th edition of award ceremony

- Date: December 31, 2017
- Site: SBS Prism Tower, Sangam-dong, Mapo-gu, Seoul
- Hosted by: Shin Dong-yup; Lee Bo-young
- Directed by: Shim Sung-min

Television coverage
- Network: SBS
- Duration: 260 minutes

The 2017 SBS Drama Awards, presented by Seoul Broadcasting System (SBS), took place on December 31, 2017 at SBS Prism Tower, Sangam-dong, Mapo-gu, Seoul. It was hosted by Shin Dong-yup and Lee Bo-young.

== Winners and nominees ==
(Winners denoted in bold)

Grand Prize (Daesang)
**Ji Sung** – **Innocent Defendant** as **Park Jung-woo**
Drama of the Year	Character of the Year
**Innocent Defendant**	**Um Ki-joon** – **Innocent Defendant** as **Cha Sun-ho/Cha Min-ho**; Kim Da-som – Band of Sisters as Yang Dal-hee/Sera Park; Kim Kap-soo – Whisper as Choi Il-hwan; Lee Sang-yeob – While You Were Sleeping as Lee Yoo-bum
Top Excellence Award, Actor in a Monday–Tuesday Drama	Top Excellence Award, Actress in a Monday–Tuesday Drama
**Namkoong Min** – **Distorted** as **Han Moo-young**; Ji Sung – Innocent Defendant as Park Jung-woo; Joo Won – My Sassy Girl as Gyeon Woo; Lee Sang-yoon – Whisper as Lee Dong-joon; Um Ki-joon – Innocent Defendant as Cha Sun-ho/Cha Min-ho; Yoon Kyun-sang – Oh, the Mysterious as Kim Jong-sam/Oh Il-seung	**Lee Bo-young** – **Whisper** as **Shin Young-joo**; Oh Yeon-seo – My Sassy Girl as Princess Hye-myung; Seo Hyun-jin – Temperature of Love as Lee Hyun-soo/Jane; Uhm Ji-won – Distorted as Kwon So-ra
Top Excellence Award, Actor in a Wednesday–Thursday Drama	Top Excellence Award, Actress in a Wednesday–Thursday Drama
**Lee Jong-suk** – **While You Were Sleeping** as **Jung Jae-chan**; Ji Chang-wook – Suspicious Partner as Noh Ji-wook; Song Seung-heon – Saimdang, Memoir of Colors as Lee Gyum; Yeo Jin-goo – Reunited Worlds as Sung Hae-sung; Yeon Woo-jin – Judge vs. Judge as Sa Eui-hyeon	**Bae Suzy** – **While You Were Sleeping** as **Nam Hong-joo**; Lee Yeon-hee – Reunited Worlds as Jung Jung-won; Lee Young-ae – Saimdang, Memoir of Colors as Shin Saimdang/Seo Ji-yoon
Top Excellence Award, Actor in a Daily/Weekend Drama	Top Excellence Award, Actress in a Daily/Weekend Drama
**Son Chang-min** – **Band of Sisters** as **Goo Pil-mo**; Kang Eun-tak – Bubbly Lovely as Park Woo-hyuk; Park Hyuk-kwon – Super Family 2017 as Na Cheon-il; Yoo Gun – Sweet Enemy as Choi Sun-ho	**Jang Seo-hee** – **Band of Sisters** as **Min Deul-rae**; Do Ji-won – Bravo My Life as Song Mi-ja/Rara; Park Eun-hye – Sweet Enemy as Oh Dal-nim; Wang Ji-hye – Bubbly Lovely as Eun Bang-wool
Excellence Award, Actor in a Monday–Tuesday Drama	Excellence Award, Actress in a Monday–Tuesday Drama
**Kwon Yul** – **Whisper** as **Kang Jung-il**; Jung Woong-in – My Sassy Girl as Jung Ki-joon; Kim Jae-wook – Temperature of Love as Park Jung-woo; Kim Min-seok – Innocent Defendant as Lee Sung-gyu; Yoo Jun-sang – Distorted as Lee Seok-min	**Park Se-young** – **Whisper** as **Choi Soo-yeon**; Jeon Hye-bin – Distorted as Oh Yoo-kyung; Jo Bo-ah – Temperature of Love as Ji Hong-ah; Jung Hye-sung – Oh, the Mysterious as Jin Jin-young; Kwon Yu-ri – Innocent Defendant as Seo Eun-hye
Excellence Award, Actor in a Wednesday–Thursday Drama	Excellence Award, Actress in a Wednesday–Thursday Drama
**Lee Sang-yeob** – **While You Were Sleeping** as **Lee Yoo-bum**; Ahn Jae-hyun – Reunited Worlds as Cha Min-joon; Choi Tae-joon – Suspicious Partner as Ji Eun-hyuk; Dong Ha – Judge vs. Judge as Do Han-joon; Jung Hae-in – While You Were Sleeping as Han Woo-tak	**Nam Ji-hyun** – **Suspicious Partner** as **Eun Bong-hee**; Ko Sung-hee – While You Were Sleeping as Shin Hee-min; Oh Yoon-ah – Saimdang, Memoir of Colors as Whieumdang Choi; Park Eun-bin – Judge vs. Judge as Lee Jung-joo/Choi Jung-joo
Excellence Award, Actor in a Daily/Weekend Drama	Excellence Award, Actress in a Daily/Weekend Drama
**Ahn Nae-sang** – **Band of Sisters** as **Na Dae-in**; Kim Min-soo – Bubbly Lovely as Kang Sang-cheol; Park Sang-min – Bravo My Life as Jung Yong-woong; Um Hyo-sup – Super Family 2017 as Choi Seok-moon	**Son Yeo-eun** – **Band of Sisters** as **Goo Se-kyung**; Gong Hyun-joo – Bubbly Lovely as Han Chae-rin; Jeong Yu-mi – Bravo My Life as Ha Do-na; Kim Min-seo – I'm Sorry, But I Love You as Jung Mo-ah; Park Tae-in – Sweet Enemy as Hong Se-na
Best New Actor	Best New Actress
**Yang Se-jong** – **Temperature of Love** as **On Jung-seon/Good Soup**; Dong Ha – Judge vs. Judge as Do Han-joon; Kang Shin-hyo – Distorted as Moon Shin-nam; Lee Jung-shin – My Sassy Girl as Kang Joon-young; Park Sun-ho – I'm Sorry, But I Love You as Kang Nam-goo	**Kim Da-som** – **Band of Sisters** as **Yang Dal-hee/Sera Park**; Jo Bo-ah – Temperature of Love as Ji Hong-ah; Jung Chae-yeon – Reunited Worlds as young Jung Jung-won; Kim Ju-hyeon – Band of Sisters as Kang Ha-ri; Kwon Nara – Suspicious Partner as Cha Yoo-jung
Best Supporting Actor	Best Supporting Actress
**Kim Won-hae** – **While You Were Sleeping** as **Choi Dam-dong**; Jo Jae-yoon – Innocent Defendant as Shin Cheol-sik; Kim Hyung-mook – Whisper as Song Tae-gon; Lee Si-eon – Reunited Worlds as Shin Ho-bang; Oh Dae-hwan – Innocent Defendant as Cheon Pil-jae aka Bundle	**Park Jin-joo** – **Reunited Worlds** as **Hong Jin-joo**; Hwang Seok-jeong – Temperature of Love as Park Eun-sung; Hwang Young-hee – While You Were Sleeping as Yoon Moon-sun; Kim Ye-won – Suspicious Partner as Na Ji-hae; Lee Cho-hee – Temperature of Love as Hwangbo Kyung
Youth Acting Award	Best Couple Award
**Kim Ji-min** – **Super Family 2017** as **Na Ik-hee**; Nam Da-reum – While You Were Sleeping as young Jung Jae-chan; Oh Ah-rin – Band of Sisters as Jin Hong-si; Shin Rin-ah – Innocent Defendant as Park Ha-yeon; Shin Yi-joon – While You Were Sleeping as young Nam Hong-joo	**Lee Jong-suk** and **Bae Suzy** – **While You Were Sleeping**; Ji Chang-wook and Nam Ji-hyun – Suspicious Partner; Yang Se-jong and Seo Hyun-jin – Temperature of Love

== Presenters ==
Order	Presenter	Award	Ref.
1	Yeo Jin-goo, Nam Ji-hyun	Youth Acting Award	
2	Ryu Soo-young, Kim Ji-young	Best Supporting Actor/Actress	
3	Ji Sung, Kwon Yu-ri	Best New Actor/Actress	
4	Ahn Nae-sang, Hwang Young-hee	Best Couple Award	
5	Choi Jin-bong	Drama of the Year	
6	On Joo-wan, Seo Ji-hye	Excellence Award in a Daily/Weekend Drama	
7	Song Jae-rim, Kim So-eun	Excellence Award in a Wednesday–Thursday Drama	
8	Yoo Yeon-seok, Seohyun	Excellence Award in a Monday–Tuesday Drama	
9	Jang Seo-hee	Character of the Year	
10	Moon Sung-keun	Top Excellence Award in a Daily/Weekend Drama	
11	Insooni	Top Excellence Award in a Wednesday–Thursday Drama	
12	Lee Deok-hwa	Top Excellence Award in a Monday–Tuesday Drama	
13	Park Jeong-hoon, Kim Sun-a	Grand Prize (Daesang)	

== Special performances ==
Order	Artist	Song	Ref.
1	Park Eun-tae	This Is the Moment (지금 이 순간) (Korean version) (Musical Jekyll and Hyde OST)	
2	Insooni feat. Wooseok (PENTAGON)	My Friend (친구여) (Original: Cho PD & Insooni)	

== See also ==
- 2017 KBS Drama Awards
- 2017 MBC Drama Awards
