= Kim Min-seok (actor) =

South Korean actor (born 1990)

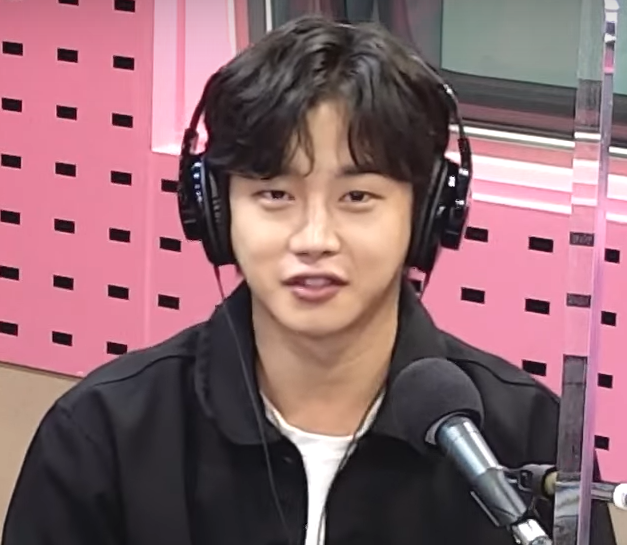
- Kim in June 2021
- Born: January 24, 1990 (age 36); Busan, South Korea
- Occupation: Actor
- Years active: 2011–present
- Agent: Spring Company

Korean name
- Hangul: 김민석
- Hanja: 金玟錫
- RR: Gim Minseok
- MR: Kim Minsŏk

Kim Min-seok (Korean: 김민석; born January 24, 1990) is a South Korean actor. He played the role of the main character in Shark: The Beginning (2021). He had supporting roles in television series such as Flower Band (2012), Descendants of the Sun (2016), The Doctors (2016), Innocent Defendant (2017), Because This Is My First Life (2017), and Lovestruck in the City (2020–2021)

== Career ==
Kim participated in Superstar K 3, a survival audition show for singers on Mnet. He showed up at the preliminary regional audition in Daegu but never made it to the group of 11 contestants that actually competed in the show. Shortly after, Kim made his debut in tvN's music youth series Flower Band, playing an ambitious keyboard player.

He gained recognition with his role in the pan-Asia hit drama Descendants of the Sun. The same year, he starred in SBS' medical drama The Doctors and won the Best New Actor award at the 53rd Baeksang Arts Awards.

In 2017, Kim played supporting roles in SBS' legal thriller Innocent Defendant, JTBC's coming-of-age drama Hello, My Twenties! 2 and tvN's romantic comedy series Because This Is My First Life. On November 16, 2017, it was reported that Kim's contract with Woollim Entertainment had expired and he had not renewed with the company. It was later reported that he had signed to Respect Entertainment.

In 2018, Kim played his first lead role in the drama special Almost Touching. In December 2018, Kim enlisted in the military to serve his conscripted duty.

In September 2020, Kim joined the cast of multi-season rom-com web series City Couple's Way of Love of Kakao TV, which will depict the real love stories of young people who live fiercely with "another me" in a complex city. The first series Lovestruck in the City is set to air on December 8, 2020 and it will be available for streaming on Netflix also.

In 2021, Kim's upcoming film Shark: The Beginning will be released on Original Film TVING, which will premiere in June 2021. and Kim will be Cameo appearing in the drama Racket Boys. In June 2021, Kim confirmed to appear in Engine On From Today, airing on KakaoTV with a total of four episodes.

In 2022, Kim renewed his contract with Respect Entertainment.

In 2025, Kim signed with Spring Company.

== Filmography ==
=== Film ===
Year	Title	Role	Notes	Ref.
2013	Moebius	Thug 1	cameo	
2017	A Special Lady	Joo-hwan		
2018	Monstrum			
2019	Jesters: The Game Changers	Pal-poong		
2019	Man of Men	Jeong Gi	Cameo	
2021	Shark: The Beginning	Cha Woo-sol		
2021	1+1	Cha Ji-cheon	Documentary film	
2025	Noise	Ki-hoon		
TBA	Night Fever			

=== Television series ===
Key
†	Denotes television productions that have not yet been released

Year	Title	Role	Notes	Ref.
2012	Flower Band	Seo Kyung-jong		
2014	Hi! School: Love On	Park Byung-wook		
2015	Who Are You: School 2015	Min-suk		
2015–2016	Imaginary Cat	Yook Hae-gong		
2016	Descendants of the Sun	Kim Gi-beom		
2016	The Doctors	Choi Kang-soo		
2017	Innocent Defendant	Lee Sung-gyu		
2017	Hello, My Twenties! 2	Seo Jang-hoon		
2017	Because This Is My First Life	Sim Won-seok		
2018	The Beauty Inside	Han Se-gye	Cameo (Episode 5–6)	
2018	Drama Special – Almost Touching	Kang Seong-chan	One act-drama	
2018	Heart Surgeons	Surgeon	Cameo (Episode 32)	
2018	Drama Stage – Withdrawal Person	Byung Doo	One act-drama; Season 2	
2021	Racket Boys	Hun-hoon	Cameo (Episode 2)	
2023	Delivery Man	Do Gyu-jin		
2023–2024	A Good Day to Be a Dog	Kang Eun-hwan	Special appearance	
2024	My Military Valentine	Lloyd		
2025	Typhoon Family	Wang Nam-mo		
2026	My Royal Nemesis	Baek Gwang-nam		
2026	Between Steps	Lim Yoo-sung		

=== Web series ===
Year	Title	Role	Notes	Ref.
2014	Aftermath	Jo In-ho		
2020–2021	Lovestruck in the City	Choi Kyeong-jun		
2021	Engine On From Today	Cha Dae-hyun		
2024	Mr. Plankton	Yoon Gi-ho/Kkari		
2025	Shark: The Storm	Cha Woo-sol	Follow-up drama to the movie Shark: The Beginning	

=== Television shows ===
Year	Title	Role	Notes	Ref.
2011	Superstar K 3	Contestant	Audition, appeared in the semi-finals	
2016	Celebrity Bromance	Main cast	Season 6 with L (Infinite)	
2016	King of Mask Singer	Contestant	as "The Sun's Junior", episodes 59–60	
2016	Flower Crew	Main cast		
2017	Law of the Jungle in Kota Manado	Main cast	Ep. 252 – 255 along with Infinite's Sungyeol	
2018	It's Dangerous Beyond the Blankets	Main cast	Ep. 1–2 & 6–7 (Season 2)	
2021	Long Live Independence	Main cast		
2023	Empty Nesters - Suri Suri Village Suri	Host	Season 3	

=== Hosting ===
Title	Year	Role	Notes	Ref.
Inkigayo	July 3, 2016 – January 22, 2017	Main MC	with Gong Seung-yeon and Jeongyeon	

=== Music video appearances ===
Year	Song title	Artist	Ref.
2017	"One Late Morning"	Joo	
2022	"Lovender"	Han Seung-yoon	

== Discography ==
=== Soundtrack appearances ===
List of soundtrack appearances, showing year released, and name of the album
Title	Year	Album
"Somehow you" (어쩌다 널)	2012	Flower Band OST

== Awards and nominations ==
Name of the award ceremony, year presented, category, nominee of the award, and the result of the nomination
Award ceremony	Year	Category	Nominee / Work	Result	Ref.
APAN Star Awards	2016	Best New Actor	Descendants of the Sun	Nominated	
Baeksang Arts Awards	2017	Best New Actor – Television	The Doctors	Won	
Grime Awards	2016	Best New Actor	Descendants of the Sun	Nominated	
Korea Drama Awards	2016	Best New Actor	Descendants of the Sun	Nominated	
KBS Drama Awards	2016	Best New Actor	Descendants of the Sun	Nominated	
SBS Entertainment Awards	2016	Best Entertainer Award	Inkigayo	Won	
SBS Drama Awards	2016	New Star Award	The Doctors	Won	
SBS Drama Awards	2017	Excellence Award, Actor in a Monday-Tuesday Drama	Innocent Defendant	Nominated	
Soompi Awards	2017	Breakout Actor	Descendants of the Sun	Won	
Soompi Awards	2018	Best Supporting Actor	Because This Is My First Life	Nominated	
The Seoul Awards	2017	Best New Actor (Drama)	Innocent Defendant	Won	
