= Shooting Stars (South Korean TV series) =

2022 South Korean television series

- Promotional poster
- Hangul: 별똥별
- RR: Byeolttongbyeol
- MR: Pyŏlttongbyŏl
- Genre: Romantic comedy
- Created by: tvN; Studio Dragon
- Written by: Choi Young-woo
- Directed by: Lee Soo-hyun
- Starring: Lee Sung-kyung; Kim Young-dae; Yoon Jong-hoon; Kim Yoon-hye; Lee Jung-shin; Park So-jin
- Music by: Kim Joon-seok (Movie Closer)
- Country of origin: South Korea
- Original language: Korean
- No. of episodes: 16

Production
- Running time: 60 minutes
- Production company: Mays Entertainment

Original release
- Network: tvN
- Release: April 22 – June 11, 2022

Shooting Stars (Korean: 별똥별; RR: Byeolttongbyeol) is a 2022 South Korean television series starring Lee Sung-kyung, Kim Young-dae, Yoon Jong-hoon, Kim Yoon-hye, Lee Jung-shin, and Park So-jin. It premiered on TVN on April 22, 2022, and aired every Friday and Saturday at 22:40 (KST) with 16 episodes. It is also available for streaming on iQIYI in selected regions.

== Synopsis ==
The series is about the romantic and comedic love story of top star Gong Tae-sung sharing a love-hate relationship with Oh Han-byul, the PR team leader of his management agency Starforce Entertainment.

== Cast ==
=== Main ===
- Lee Sung-kyung as Oh Han-byul

Head of the public relations department of Star Force Entertainment. She is a person with extraordinary eloquence and excellent crisis response ability. She is also in charge of various departments such as public relations, crisis response, and communication, and dominates the industry. Oh Han-byul and Gong Tae-sung were university mates.

- Kim Young-dae as Gong Tae-sung
  - Moon Seong-hyun as teenage Gong Tae-sung

A top star actor who is signed with Star Force Entertainment. He is loved by the public for his bright, angelic smile with a polite and upright image. However, unknown to the public, he harbors a scarred past. Gong Tae-sung and Oh Han-byul were university mates.

- Yoon Jong-hoon as Kang Yu-sung

A manager with good looks and good manners who is often mistaken for a celebrity.

- Kim Yoon-hye as Park Ho-young

A former Taekwondo player turned manager.

- Lee Jung-shin as Do Soo-hyuk

An entertainment lawyer and the consultant of Star Force Entertainment.

- Park So-jin as Jo Ki-bum

Oh Han-byul's close friend and entertainment reporter.

=== Supporting ===
==== Star Force Entertainment ====
- Ha Do-kwon as Choi Ji-hoon

Director of Star Force Entertainment.

- Jang Hee-ryung as Baek Da-hye

An actress under the Star Force Entertainment, a fan of Gong Tae-sung. She stars in the drama 'The World of Stars' as the female lead, alongside Tae-sung.

- Lee Han-ik as Kang Min-gyu

He was Tae-sung's new manager. Being unable to deal with Tae-sung's personality, he quit his job at Star Force and later joined DS actors.

- Jin Ho-eun as Byun Jeong-yeol

A new manager under Star Force Entertainment. He becomes Tae-sung's new manager after Kang Min-kyu and protects Tae-sung with respect and pride to work with him.

- Shin Hyun-seung as Yoon Jae-hyun

A rookie actor under Star Force. He plays a supporting role in the drama 'The World of Stars'.

- Kwon Han-sol as Hong Bo-in

The youngest member of Star Force Entertainment's PR team. A new employee full of stupid mistakes.

- Yoon Sang-jeong as Chae Eun-soo

PR team member of Star Force Entertainment.

- Im Sung-kyun as Lee Yoon-woo

An actor under Star Force Entertainment who has been close friends with Tae-sung since he was a trainee.

- Jang Do-ha as Jang Seok-woo

An actor under Star Force Entertainment. He is a troublemaker who caused many dating rumors.

==== DS Actors ====
- Kim Dae-gon as Han Dae-soo

CEO of DS Actors agency who was a manager at Star Force Entertainment.

- Lee Si-woo as Jin Yu-na

A rookie actress under DS Actors. She plays a supporting role in the drama The World of Stars.

- Kang Jun-gyu as Shim Jin-woo

An actor under DS Actors who moved from Star Force to DS with Dae-soo.

==== Others ====
- Lee Seung-hyub as Kang Si-deok

The owner of Sidokine, a famous soup restaurant in Daegu. He later becomes a rookie actor under Star Force after Park Ho-young convinced him and adopts stage name Kang Yu-sung.

- Choi Ji-woo as Eun Si-woo / Kim Bok-soon

A legendary actress representing the 90s, later revealed to be Gong Tae-sung's biological mother.

- So Hee-jung as Kwon Myung-hee

Gong Tae-sung's housemaid who takes care of him with a warm and friendly personality, but harbours a different intention within her.

- Heo Gyu as Yuki

The owner of Organic Bar, Hanbyul, Kibeom, and Hoyoung's hideout. More than anyone else, he is quick to hear about the entertainment industry.

- Yoo Gun-woo as Director Park Han-suk

The director of the drama 'The World of Stars' starring Tae Sung and Da Hye.

- Lee Joo-won as Yang Young-gi

The director of OnStylebo where Jo Ki-bum works.

- Yoon Young-min as Lee Hae-min

Veteran secretary of Su Hyuk's law firm Biho.

=== Special appearance ===
- Park Jeong-min as Park Jo-eun, Oh Han-byul's blind date partner (Ep. 1)
- Yoon Byung-hee as Secretary of the Overseas Volunteer Group (Ep. 1)
- Seo Yi-sook as an actress under Star Force Entertainment (Ep. 1)
- Kim Seul-gi as Happy, a rookie singer (Ep. 2)
- Lee Ki-woo as Ahn Jun-ho, an actor under Star Force Entertainment (Ep. 3)
- Kang Ki-doong as Dong-jun, Ahn Jun-ho's manager (Ep. 3)
- Lee Sang-woo Han Seung-Il, a famous actor newly signed with Star Force (Ep. 4)
- Chae Jong-hyeop as Ham Yu-jin, an actor (Ep. 5)
- Oh Eui-shik as Cha Min-ho, entertainment department reporter and Jo Ki-bum's ex-boyfriend (Ep. 6)
- Moon Ga-young as Yeo Ha-jin, an actress who was rumoured to be dating Gong Tae-sung in the past (Ep. 6, 8) (Note: The character appears in a short crossover scene, alluding Director Lee Soo-hyun's previous work Find Me in Your Memory (2020) where the character originally appears.)
- Song Ji-hyo as Song Ji-hee, an actress (Ep. 7)
- Kim Dong-wook as Lee Jung-hoon (Ep. 8)
- Jin Ki-joo as Kim Jin-kyung, Entertainment Public Relations Manager (Ep.11)
- Lee Sang-yeob as Do Ji-hyuk, an attorney and Do Soo-hyuk's elder brother (Ep.11)
- Um Ki-joon as Yoon Jang-seok, an actor (Ep. 13)
- Bong Tae-gyu as Sung Woo-ju, CEO of Yoon Jang-seok's agency (Ep. 13)

== Production ==
=== Filming ===
On March 11, 2022, it was confirmed that actor Ha Do-kwon contracted COVID-19 and all filming schedules have been cancelled.

=== Casting ===
Previously, Kim Young-dae worked together with both Yoon Jong-hoon and Ha Do-kwon in The Penthouse: War in Life; this will be their first reunion project after the end of the three-season Penthouse.

=== Release ===
On March 3, 2022, photos from the official script reading were published.

== Original soundtrack ==
=== Part 1 ===
Released on April 22, 2022
No.	Title	Lyrics	Music	Artist	Length
1.	"Shooting Star"	Kim Beom-joo (A.muse); Kim Si-hyuk (A.muse); Nam Ki-moon (A.muse)	Kim Beom-joo (A.muse); Kim Si-hyuk (A.muse); Nam Ki-moon (A.muse)	Nam Woo-hyun	3:27
2.	"Shooting Star" (Inst.)		Kim Beom-joo (A.muse); Kim Si-hyuk (A.muse); Nam Ki-moon (A.muse)		3:27
Total length:					6:54

=== Part 2 ===
Released on April 29, 2022
No.	Title	Lyrics	Music	Artist	Length
1.	"How I Feel"	Kim Beom-joo (A.muse); Kim Si-hyuk (A.muse); Nam Ki-moon (A.muse)	Kim Beom-joo (A.muse); Kim Si-hyuk (A.muse); Nam Ki-moon (A.muse)	Kim Jae-hwan	3:30
2.	"How I Feel" (Inst.)		Kim Beom-joo (A.muse); Kim Si-hyuk (A.muse); Nam Ki-moon (A.muse)		3:30
Total length:					7:00

=== Part 3 ===
Released on May 7, 2022
No.	Title	Lyrics	Music	Artist	Length
1.	"My secret, My everything" (그렇게 넌 나의 비밀이 되었고)	Lee Chi-hoon	Park Seong-il	Sondia; Vincent Blue	4:11
2.	"My secret, My everything" (그렇게 넌 나의 비밀이 되었고; Inst.)		Park Seong-il		4:11
Total length:					8:22

=== Part 4 ===
Released on May 21, 2022
No.	Title	Lyrics	Music	Artist	Length
1.	"Departure from a Country" (출국)	Takyoung	Harim	Kyuhyun	4:17
2.	"Departure from a Country" (출국; Inst.)		Harim		4:17
Total length:					8:34

=== Part 5 ===
Released on June 3, 2022
No.	Title	Lyrics	Music	Artist	Length
1.	"Won't give up"	Kim Beom-ju (A.muse); Kim Si-hyuk (A.muse)	Kim Beom-ju (A.muse); Kim Si-hyuk (A.muse)	Choi Yu Ree	3:49
2.	"Won't give up" (Inst.)		Kim Beom-ju (A.muse); Kim Si-hyuk (A.muse)		3:49
Total length:					7:38

== Viewership ==
Sh**ting Stars : South Korea viewers per episode (thousands)

Season	Episode number																Average
Season	1	2	3	4	5	6	7	8	9	10	11	12	13	14	15	16	Average
1	408	434	346	373	357	411	336	417	394	N/A	290	273	330	322	330	376	N/A

Source: Audience measurement performed nationwide by Nielsen Korea. (Note: Due to some ratings not recorded, the exact average rating is unknown.)

Average TV viewership ratings
Ep.	Original broadcast date	Average audience share (Nielsen Korea)	
Ep.	Original broadcast date	Nationwide	Seoul
1	April 22, 2022	1.632% (3rd)	1.676% (3rd)
2	April 23, 2022	1.792% (7th)	1.886% (6th)
3	April 29, 2022	1.497% (4th)	1.676% (3rd)
4	April 30, 2022	1.534% (5th)	1.617% (4th)
5	May 6, 2022	1.452% (3rd)	1.506% (3rd)
6	May 7, 2022	1.415% (10th)	1.555% (5th)
7	May 13, 2022	1.284% (12th)	1.303% (7th)
8	May 14, 2022	1.636% (12th)	1.854% (6th)
9	May 20, 2022	1.462% (7th)	1.585% (4th)
10	May 21, 2022	1.335% (18th)	—N/a
11	May 27, 2022	1.177% (8th)	1.310% (4th)
12	May 28, 2022	1.163% (20th)	—N/a
13	June 3, 2022	1.343% (6th)	1.474% (5th)
14	June 4, 2022	1.263% (17th)	—N/a
15	June 10, 2022	1.296% (8th)	1.526% (3rd)
16	June 11, 2022	1.453% (11th)	1.477% (10th)
Average		1.421%	—
In the table above, the blue numbers represent the lowest ratings and the red numbers represent the highest ratings.; This drama aired on a cable channel/pay TV which normally has a relatively smaller audience compared to free-to-air TV/public broadcasters (KBS, SBS, MBC, and EBS).
