= Bong Tae-gyu =

South Korean actor (born 1981)

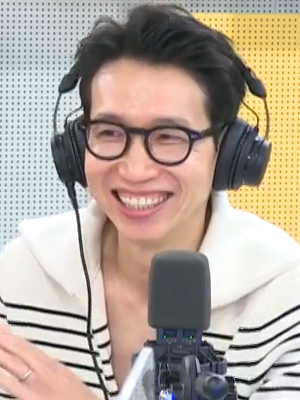
- Bong in October 2020
- Born: May 19, 1981 (age 45); Dobong District, Seoul, South Korea
- Education: Myongji University (Theater and Film)
- Occupation: Actor
- Years active: 2000–present
- Agent: Media Lab Seeso
- Spouse: Hasisi Park (m. 2015)
- Children: 2

Korean name
- Hangul: 봉태규
- RR: Bong Taegyu
- MR: Pong T'aegyu

Bong Tae-gyu (Korean: 봉태규; born May 19, 1981) is a South Korean actor.

== Filmography ==
=== Film ===
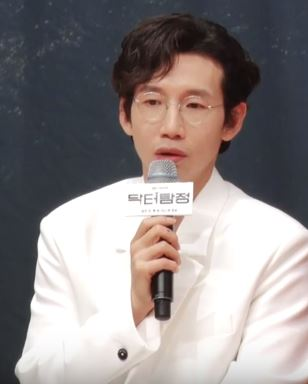
Bong in July 2019

Year	Title	Role	Notes	Ref.
2000	Tears	Jang		
2002	Jungle Juice	Tang-gae		
2002	Saving My Hubby			
2002	Conduct Zero	Soo-dong		
2003	Tube			
2003	A Good Lawyer's Wife	Shin Ji-woon		
2004	Au Revoir, UFO	Sang-gyu		
2004	The Twenty's Law		Twentidentity short film	
2004	Arahan		Cameo	
2005	The President's Last Bang		Cameo	
2005	When Romance Meets Destiny	Yu Gwang-tae		
2006	Ssunday Seoul	Do-yeon		
2006	See You After School	Namgoong Dal		
2006	Family Ties	Kyung-suk		
2006	How the Lack of Love Affects Two Men	Dong-hyun		
2007	Two Faces of My Girlfriend	Gu-chang		
2008	A Tale of Legendary Libido	Byeon Gang-soe		
2012	The Beat Goes On	Seo Chang-dae		
2013	Happiness for Sale	Kang-ho		
2022	It's Alright		TVING Shorts Film	
2022	Midnight Horror: Six Nights	Priest	Segment: "Hall"	

=== Television series ===
Year	Title	Role	Notes	Ref.
2003	Cats on the Roof	Nam Jung-woo		
2003	Nonstop 4			
2004	Ms. Kim's Million Dollar Quest	Kim Bong-gyu		
2004	Han River Ballad	Choi Kang-soo		
2007	If in Love...Like Them			
2008	Working Mom	Park Jae-seong		
2010	Personal Taste	Lee Won-ho	Cameo	
2012	KBS Drama Special – "Don't Worry, I'm a Ghost"	Moon-gi		
2015	KBS Drama Special – "Trains Don't Stop at Noryangjin Station"	Mo Hee-joon		
2018	Return	Kim Hak-bum		
2019	Doctor Detective	Heo Min-ki		
2020–2021	The Penthouse: War in Life	Lee Kyu-jin	Season 1–3	
2022	Shooting Stars	Sung Woo-ju	Cameo; episode 13	
2023	Pandora: Beneath the Paradise	Ko Sung-chan		

=== Television shows ===
Year	Title	Role	Notes	Ref.
2013	Hwasin – Controller of the Heart	Host	Ep.14–31	
2016–2017	Mr. House Husband	Cast	Ep. 1–14	
2018–2019	The Return of Superman	Cast	Ep. 221 – 259 (with his child Si-ha)	
2021–2022	Embarrassment	Host	Season 1–4	
2021	We Don't Bite: Villains in the Countryside	Cast Member	with Um Ki-joon and Yoon Jong-hoon	
2022	Room Corner 1 Row	Host		
2022	World Dark Tour	Host		
2022	Oh! My Wedding	Wedding planner		
2022	Your Literacy+	Host		
2023	No Money No Art	Art curator		

=== Hosting ===
Year	Title	Role	Notes	Ref.
2021	Bechdel Roundtable	Host	with Byun Young-joo	

=== Radio shows ===
Year	Title	Role	Notes	Ref.
2022	Lee Seok-hoon's Brunch Cafe	Special DJ	11–12 July	

=== Music video appearances ===
Year	Title	Artist	Ref.
2022	"I Hate Trot" (나는 트로트가 싫어요)	Im Chang-jung	

== Stage ==
=== Theatre ===
Year	Title	Role	Notes	Ref.
2009–2010	University of Laughs	Playwright		
2011	Falling for Eve	Adam		

== Awards and nominations ==
Name of the award ceremony, year presented, category, nominee of the award, and the result of the nomination
Award ceremony	Year	Category	Nominee / Work	Result	Ref.
Baeksang Arts Awards	2018	Best Supporting Actor – Television	Return	Nominated	
Blue Dragon Film Awards	2003	Best Supporting Actor	A Good Lawyer's Wife	Nominated	
Director's Cut Awards	2003	Best New Actor	A Good Lawyer's Wife	Won	
Grand Bell Awards	2004	Best New Actor	A Good Lawyer's Wife	Nominated	
KBS Drama Awards	2012	Best Actor in a Special/One-Act Drama	Don't Worry, I'm a Ghost	Nominated	
KBS Drama Awards	2015	Best Actor in a Special/One-Act Drama	Trains Don't Stop at Noryangjin Station	Won	
KBS Entertainment Awards	2018	Hot Issue Variety Award	The Return of Superman	Won	
SBS Drama Awards	2008	Producer's Award	Working Mom	Won	
SBS Drama Awards	2008	Excellence Award, Actor in a Drama Special	Working Mom	Nominated	
SBS Drama Awards	2018	Best Character	Return	Won	
SBS Drama Awards	2018	Excellence Award, Actor in a Wednesday-Thursday Drama	Return	Nominated	
SBS Drama Awards	2020	Excellence Award, Actor in a Mid-Length Drama	The Penthouse: War in Life	Won	
The Seoul Awards	2018	Best Supporting Actor (Drama)	Return	Nominated	
Wildflower Film Awards	2026	Best Supporting Actor	Godangdo	Won	
