= Man of Vendetta =

- Film poster
- Directed by: Woo Min-ho
- Written by: Woo Min-ho
- Produced by: Jung Hoon-tak; Choi Jae-won; Chun Seung-chul
- Starring: Kim Myung-min; Um Ki-joon
- Cinematography: Jo Yong-gyu
- Edited by: Kim Sun-min
- Music by: Lee Jae-jin
- Distributed by: Synergy
- Release date: July 1, 2010
- Running time: 114 minutes
- Country: South Korea
- Language: Korean
- Box office: US$6,586,710

Man of Vendetta (Korean: 파괴된 사나이; RR: Pagoedoen sanai) is a 2010 South Korean action thriller film about a pastor whose life changes after the abduction of his daughter.

Um Ki-joon was nominated for Best New Actor in Film at the 47th Baeksang Arts Awards in 2011.

== Plot ==
Joo Young-soo (Kim Myung-min) is a devoted Christian and well-respected pastor whose 5-year-old daughter, Hye-rin (Kim So-hyun), gets kidnapped. The story starts with Young-soo attempting to give the kidnapper the ransom money in exchange for his daughter in an ice hockey rink, but because of his wife, Min-kyung's (Park Joo-mi) interference by informing the police, the kidnapper doesn't show. Eight years later, Young-soo loses his faith in God and leaves the church while his wife is still desperately searching for their daughter. He opens up a business and mocks his wife for not losing hope. He soon receives a call from the kidnapper, saying his daughter is still alive and they're asking for more ransom money, demanding that there be no police this time. Now given another chance to save his daughter, he takes matters into his own hands.

== Cast ==
- Kim Myung-min as Joo Young-soo
- Um Ki-joon as Choi Byeong-chul
- Kim So-hyun as Joo Hye-rin
- Park Joo-mi as Park Min-kyung
- Lee Byung-joon as Detective Koo
- Oh Kwang-rok as GPS technician
- Kim Eung-soo as corrupt hospital chief Kim
- Min Bok-gi as delivery man
- Lee Ho-jae as Mr. No (audiophile selling expensive amp)
- Lee Jang-won as fat boss (Byeong-chul's boss)
