= Return (TV series) =

2018 South Korean television series

- Promotional poster
- Hangul: 리턴
- RR: Riteon
- MR: Rit'ŏn
- Genre: Mystery; Thriller; Legal drama
- Created by: Park Young-soo (SBS)
- Written by: Choi Kyung-mi
- Directed by: Joo Dong-min
- Starring: Go Hyun-jung (Ep. 1–15); Park Jin-hee (Ep. 16–34); Lee Jin-wook; Shin Sung-rok; Bong Tae-gyu; Park Ki-woong; Jung Eun-chae; Yoon Jong-hoon
- Music by: Kim Joon-seok
- Country of origin: South Korea
- Original language: Korean
- No. of episodes: 34 (Note: Originally scheduled to air for 32 episodes, the series was extended by two episodes in lieu of three preempts.) (Note: In order to circumvent Korean laws that prevent commercial breaks in the middle of an episode, what would previously have been aired as single 70 minute episodes are now being repackaged as two 35 minute episodes, with two episodes being shown each night with a commercial break between the two.)

Production
- Executive producer: SBS Drama Operation Team
- Producer: Park Hyung-ki
- Camera setup: Single-camera
- Running time: 35 minutes
- Production company: The Story Works

Original release
- Network: SBS TV
- Release: January 17 – March 22, 2018

Return (Korean: 리턴) is a 2018 South Korean television series. It aired on SBS TV from January 17 to March 22, 2018, every Wednesday and Thursday at 22:00 (KST) for 34 episodes.

== Synopsis ==
A body is found on the freeway, and the four suspects are South Korea's powerful elites. Choi Ja-hye, the most influential and famous female lawyer in the country, decides to take the case and defend Kang In-ho, per the request of her law school friend Geum Na-ra. However, In-ho was having an affair with the victim and was seen having an argument with her the day before the murder took place. As Ja-hye investigates the case with Dokgo Young, a detective with a dark past as a juvenile criminal, they realize that the case is not a simple murder but was born out of corruption and dark secrets among In-ho and his friends.

== Cast ==
=== Main ===
- Go Hyun-jung/Park Jin-hee as Choi Ja-hye

A lawyer who is now the host of a legal-themed TV show titled Return. She helps Na-ra to solve In-ho's trial.

- Lee Jin-wook as Dokgo Young

A hot-tempered detective. He has sharp analytical skills to follow the trail of a murder case. Throughout the series, he manages to solve the murder cases, but is unable to capture the socialites throughout the years for their wrongdoings.

- Shin Sung-rok as Oh Tae-seok

A calm and successful CEO of an IT company, but turns to a have shady behavior when he attempts to cover up a mistake he or Hak-beom makes. He is currently being framed for murdering Ahn Hak-soo, a former police officer who owns a karaoke bar. After Tae-seok's and Hak-beom's secret is revealed, he plans to silence anyone who gets in his way, especially Attorney Choi.

- Bong Tae-gyu as Kim Hak-beom

A professor in theology studies at Myungsung Foundation. He turns out to be an impulsive and abusive man who resorts to violence without thinking of its consequences. When things do not go on his way, he tends to displace his anger onto other characters or bribe them with money in the show.

- Park Ki-woong as Kang In-ho

The chief director at Taeha Corporation. He was in a relationship with Mi-jung during their younger times. After marrying Na-ra, he had an adulterous affair with Mi-jung for one year and became the co-founder of Mi-jung's wine bar. When Mi-jung was found murdered, he was framed and put into prison. Despite being bribed by his wife, Na-ra, their marriage become more estranged and his attempts to save the marriage becomes futile due to his wife's discovery of his affair with Mi-jung. Throughout the series, he was the one who knocked down a little girl when he was in high school. Unfortunately, he reluctantly followed Mi-jung's and the rest of his friends' suggestion to throw the girl into the sea.

- Jung Eun-chae as Geum Na-ra

In-ho's wife and a former lawyer who passed her bar examination. Mi-jung describes her as an innocent, devoted and beautiful wife of In-ho. After Mi-jung was murdered, she discovered In-ho's affair. Currently, she has an estranged relationship with In-ho.

- Yoon Jong-hoon as Seo Jun-hee
  - Ji Min-hyuk as young Jun-hee

A doctor and an associate with Tae-seok, Hak-beom and In-ho. Due to regrets and guilt he has gone through, he succumbed into drug addiction for years to forget the incident as well as stresses in workplace. When he witnessed Mi-jung's death and became his friends' accomplices, he decided to turn himself to the police. However, he was nearly murdered by both Tae-seok and Hak-beom. Despite running away from his mistakes and his friends, Na-ra managed to convince him to turn himself to the police, together with the evidences he had in the USB.

=== Supporting ===
- Oh Dae-hwan as Kim Jung-soo

A doctor at The Daemyung Hospital.

- Kim Hee-jung as Kang Young-eun

Attorney Choi's assistant attorney. She is a very observant and calm character. She helps both Choi and Na-ra to find Joon-hee in a hospital in Taein.

- Kim Dong-young as Kim Dong-bae

A detective working with Dokgo Young. He saved Jun-hee from car crash. He turns out to have an alliance with Ja-hye to expose Taek-seok and the rest of the socialites' corruptions.

- Seo Hye-rin as Ko Seok-soon
- Son Jong-hak as An Hak-soo

A corrupt police, who used to be Detective Young's superior. He was the police-in-charge of the Sung Jung-mi's drowning case in 1999.

- Yoon Joo-hee as Park Jin-joo
- Shin Rin-ah as Kang Dal-rae

In-ho's and Na-ra's quiet and introverted daughter.

- Jung Ji-yoon as Ms. Kyung

=== Special appearances ===
- Han Eun-jung as Yeom Mi-jung/Rachel Yeom (Ep. 1–2)

The victim of In-ho's case. She owned a wine bar, sponsored by In-ho. She had an affair with him for a year. After aborting his child, she planned to ruin In-ho's family by getting close to Na-ra.

- Park Jun-gyu as Park Byung-ho
- Shin Yoo-ram as a drug trafficker
- Jung Han-hun as Seo Joon-hee's father
- Kim Hyung-mok as Kim Byung-ki

A car salesperson, who was murdered by Tae-seok

- Kang Nam-gil as a judge
- Jo Seung-yeon as a prosecutor
- Hong Ji-yoon as Bang Seon-yeong
- Kim Myung-su as Judge Lim Woo-jae
- Kang Seong-min as a foreign car dealer
- Ahn Hye-kyung as a client
- Lee Kye-in

== Production ==
The first script reading of the cast was held on November 15, 2017.

=== Controversy ===
On February 7, 2018, it was reported that there was a large dispute on the set of the series on the 5th, between lead actress Go Hyun-jung and the series' director Joo Dong-min. The following day, Go's agency officially announced that the actress would be leaving the team due to irreconcilable differences with the directing team concerning the production process. The agency also denied the initial reports that her sudden departure was due to her physically assaulting director Joo; stating that "there was indeed a verbal conflict but reports of physical assault was nonsensical". Meanwhile, viewers of the series flooded SBS website with comments blaming the producer for "abusing his power" and calling for director Joo to quit instead.

Actress Park Jin-hee later replaced Go Hyun-jung for the role of Choi Ja-hye. She started filming on February 13 and first appeared on the sixteenth episode.

== Original soundtrack ==
=== Part 1 ===
Released on January 24, 2018
No.	Title	Artist	Length
1.	"Return" (리턴)	Ronny Chu	3:45

=== Part 2 ===
Released on January 31, 2018
No.	Title	Artist	Length
2.	"Again"	Jang Jae-in	3:20

=== Part 3 ===
Released on February 28, 2018
No.	Title	Artist	Length
2.	"Black Sun" (검은 해)	Se So Neon	3:30

== Ratings ==
Ep.	Original broadcast date	Average audience share			
Ep.	Original broadcast date	TNmS		Nielsen Korea	
Ep.	Original broadcast date	Nationwide	Seoul	Nationwide	Seoul
1	January 17, 2018	6.6% (19th)	7.4%	6.7% (19th)	7.5% (11th)
2	January 17, 2018	7.8% (15th)	9.3%	8.5% (9th)	9.0% (6th)
3	January 18, 2018	7.0% (20th)	7.7%	7.8% (14th)	8.5% (9th)
4	January 18, 2018	7.9% (15th)	8.6%	9.0% (8th)	9.7% (5th)
5	January 24, 2018	9.1% (14th)	10.2%	11.0% (8th)	12.0% (5th)
6	January 24, 2018	10.5% (9th)	12.4%	14.1% (4th)	16.0% (3rd)
7	January 25, 2018	9.8% (11th)	10.9%	12.7% (6th)	13.6% (5th)
8	January 25, 2018	11.5% (8th)	12.7%	15.2% (3rd)	16.4% (3rd)
9	January 31, 2018	9.6% (11th)	10.9%	12.7% (5th)	14.0% (4th)
10	January 31, 2018	11.2% (8th)	12.8%	15.1% (3rd)	16.7% (3rd)
11	February 1, 2018	11.2% (10th)	12.8%	14.2% (4th)	15.8% (4th)
12	February 1, 2018	12.7% (8th)	14.4%	16.0% (3rd)	17.7% (2nd)
13	February 7, 2018	10.4% (11th)	12.2%	14.4% (5th)	16.2% (3rd)
14	February 7, 2018	12.6% (8th)	14.8%	17.4% (2nd)	19.6% (1st)
15	February 14, 2018 (Note: Episodes 15 and 16 were put on hold due to the production incident and SBS instead aired a program on 2018 Pyeongchang Winter Olympics.)	11.5% (5th)	12.7%	12.8% (4th)	14.0% (4th)
16	February 14, 2018	15.7% (2nd)	16.9%	17.0% (2nd)	18.2% (1st)
17	February 22, 2018 (Note: No episodes were aired on February 21 as well due to the Olympics.)	11.3% (9th)	12.5%	12.2% (5th)	13.6% (4th)
18	February 22, 2018	13.8% (3rd)	15.4%	16.5% (1st)	18.2% (1st)
19	February 28, 2018	10.7% (9th)	11.2%	11.5% (5th)	12.0% (5th)
20	February 28, 2018	13.5% (4th)	14.3%	15.2% (3rd)	16.0% (2nd)
21	March 1, 2018	11.8% (8th)	13.0%	13.6% (5th)	14.8% (3rd)
22	March 1, 2018	14.1% (4th)	15.5%	16.3% (2nd)	17.7% (2nd)
23	March 7, 2018	11.6% (7th)	12.8%	13.7% (5th)	14.9% (4th)
24	March 7, 2018	14.0% (4th)	15.7%	16.2% (3rd)	17.9% (2nd)
25	March 8, 2018	11.8% (8th)	13.5%	13.4% (5th)	15.1% (3rd)
26	March 8, 2018	13.7% (6th)	14.9%	16.2% (2nd)	17.4% (2nd)
27	March 14, 2018	10.4% (5th)	12.0%	12.1% (5th)	13.7% (4th)
28	March 14, 2018	12.2% (4th)	14.3%	14.7% (3rd)	16.7% (2nd)
29	March 15, 2018	11.2% (8th)	12.8%	13.0% (5th)	14.6% (3rd)
30	March 15, 2018	12.6% (6th)	14.5%	15.2% (2nd)	17.1% (2nd)
31	March 21, 2018	10.0% (14th)	11.6%	13.3% (5th)	14.9% (3rd)
32	March 21, 2018	11.8% (6th)	13.5%	16.1% (2nd)	17.8% (2nd)
33	March 22, 2018	12.7% (7th)	14.8%	14.6% (4th)	16.4% (3rd)
34	March 22, 2018	13.8% (5th)	15.6%	16.7% (2nd)	18.4% (1st)
Average		11.4%	12.8%	13.7%	15.1%
In the table above, the blue numbers represent the lowest ratings and the red numbers represent the highest ratings.

== Awards and nominations ==
Year	Award	Category	Recipient	Result	Ref.
2018	54th Baeksang Arts Awards	Best Supporting Actor	Bong Tae-gyu	Nominated	
2018	2nd The Seoul Awards	Best Supporting Actor	Bong Tae-gyu	Nominated	
2018	SBS Drama Awards	Top Excellence Award, Actor in a Wednesday-Thursday Drama	Lee Jin-wook	Nominated	
2018	SBS Drama Awards	Top Excellence Award, Actress in a Wednesday-Thursday Drama	Park Jin-hee	Nominated	
2018	SBS Drama Awards	Top Excellence Award, Actor in a Wednesday-Thursday Drama	Park Ki-woong	Nominated	
2018	SBS Drama Awards	Top Excellence Award, Actor in a Wednesday-Thursday Drama	Bong Tae-gyu	Nominated	
2018	SBS Drama Awards	Excellence Award, Actress in a Wednesday-Thursday Drama	Jung Eun-chae	Nominated	
2018	SBS Drama Awards	Best Supporting Actor	Oh Dae-hwan	Nominated	
2018	SBS Drama Awards	Best New Actor	Yoon Jong-hoon	Nominated	
2018	SBS Drama Awards	Best Character	Yoon Jong-hoon	Won	
2018	SBS Drama Awards	Best Character	Shin Sung-rok	Won	
2018	SBS Drama Awards	Best Character	Park Ki-woong	Won	
2018	SBS Drama Awards	Best Character	Bong Tae-gyu	Won	
