= Hyun Woo =

South Korean actor

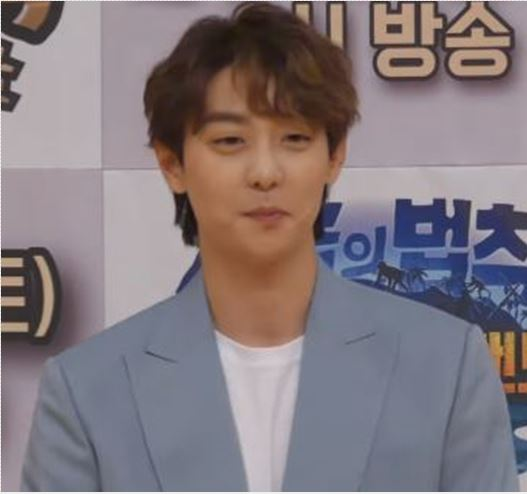
- Hyun in 2019
- Born: Kim Hyun-woo; January 18, 1985 (age 41); Seoul, South Korea
- Occupation: Actor
- Years active: 2008–present
- Agent: Glorious Entertainment

Korean name
- Hangul: 김현우
- Hanja: 金顯祐
- RR: Gim Hyeonu
- MR: Kim Hyŏnu

Hyun Woo (Korean: 현우; born Kim Hyun-woo on January 18, 1985) is a South Korean actor. He is best known for his roles in the television series Pasta and the sitcom Living Among the Rich.

In 2009, he, Lee Jang-woo and No Min-woo formed the K-pop project group 24/7, which released the single 24 Hours a Day, 7 Days a Week, then disbanded soon after. Hyun Woo also hosted Music Bank from 2010 to 2011.

== Filmography ==
=== Television series ===
Year	Title	Role	Ref.
2009	Hilarious Housewives	Kim Hyun-woo	
2009	Dream	Narcissus	
2010	Pasta	Lee Ji-hoon	
2010	My Country Calls	Agent Na Joon-min	
2010	Treasure Hunter		
2010	We Teach Love	Oh Ji-hoon	
2011	Hair Show	Yoon Ho-yeol	
2011	Deep Rooted Tree	Seong Sam-mun	
2011	Living Among the Rich	Hyun-woo	
2013	The Virus	Kim In-chul	
2013	Ugly Alert	Kang Chul-soo	
2014	The Taste of Curry	Kyung-pyo	
2014	Gap-dong	young Cha Do-hyeok	
2014	My Dear Cat	Yeom Chi-woong	
2015	Sweet Temptation	Han-woo	
2015	Yumi's Room	Oh Ji-ram	
2015	Songgot: The Piercer	Joo Kang-min	
2016	The Royal Gambler	King Gyeongjong of Joseon	
2016	The Gentlemen of Wolgyesu Tailor Shop	Kang Tae-yang	
2017	Bravo My Life	Kim Bum-woo	
2018	Witch's Love	Ma Sung-tae	
2019	The Light in Your Eyes	Kwon Jang-ho (cameo, ep. 1)	
2019	Woman of 9.9 Billion	Kang Tae-hyun	
2021	Law School	Yoo Seung-jae	
2023	The Secret Romantic Guesthouse	Lee Chang	
2025	Marie and Her Three Daddies	Lee Gang-se	

=== Film ===
Year	Title	Role	Notes/Ref.
2008	A Frozen Flower	King's men	
2013	Killer Toon	Kim Young-soo	
2015	Detective K: Secret of the Lost Island	Crown Prince	(cameo)
2017	You With Me	Jayson	A Korean-Filipino Film with Devon Seron and Jin Ju-Hyeong

=== Variety show ===
Year	Title	Notes
2010	Honey Pot	
2010-2011	Music Bank	Host
2012	The Duet	
2013	Tokimeki Kandora	
2014	The Human Condition - Season 2	
2015	Match Made in Heaven	
2015	King of Mask Singer	Contestant (Through the Hidden Web) Ep 3, 4
2017	Singing Battle	Host

== Musical theatre ==
Year	Title	Role
2010–2011	Really Really Like You	Kang Jin-young
2014	Cafe In	Kang Ji-min

== Awards and nominations ==
Year	Award	Category	Nominated work	Result
2014	KBS Drama Awards	Best Actor	My Dear Cat	Nominated
2016	KBS Drama Awards	Best Couple with Lee Se-young	The Gentlemen of Wolgyesu Tailor Shop	Won
