= The Virus (TV series) =

- Promotional poster
- Genre: Medical drama Mystery; Thriller
- Created by: Jinhee Choi; Jiyoung Park
- Written by: Lee Myung-sook
- Directed by: Choi Young-soo
- Starring: Um Ki-joon; Lee So-jung; Lee Ki-woo; Jo Hee-bong
- Country of origin: South Korea
- Original language: Korean
- No. of episodes: 10

Production
- Producers: Jinseok Lee; Changho Lee
- Production company: JS Pictures

Original release
- Network: OCN
- Release: March 1 – May 3, 2013

The Virus (Korean: 더 바이러스) is a 2013 South Korean television series starring Um Ki-joon, Lee So-jung, Lee Ki-woo, and Jo Hee-bong. It aired on OCN from March 1 to May 3, 2013, on Fridays at 22:00 for 10 episodes.

== Plot ==
Lee Myung-hyun and his disease control task force investigate a mutant virus that has a 100% fatality rate and kills the infected within three days. Not only must they find an antidote, they must also stop the epidemic from spreading and killing all of humankind.

== Cast ==
- Um Ki-joon as Lee Myung-hyun
- Lee So-jung as Jeon Ji-won
- Lee Ki-woo as Kim Se-jin
- Ahn Suk-hwan as Kim Do-jin
- Jo Hee-bong as Go Soo-kil
- Kim Yu-bin as Lee Joo-young
- Park Min-woo as Bong Sun-dong
- Hyun Woo as Kim In-chul
- Oh Yong as Jung Woo-jin
- Song Young-kyu as Yoon Il-joong

== International broadcast ==
It aired in Japan on cable channel KNTV from October 23 to November 21, 2013, and was re-aired on cable channel BS-Japan.
