= Oh Kwang-rok =

South Korean actor

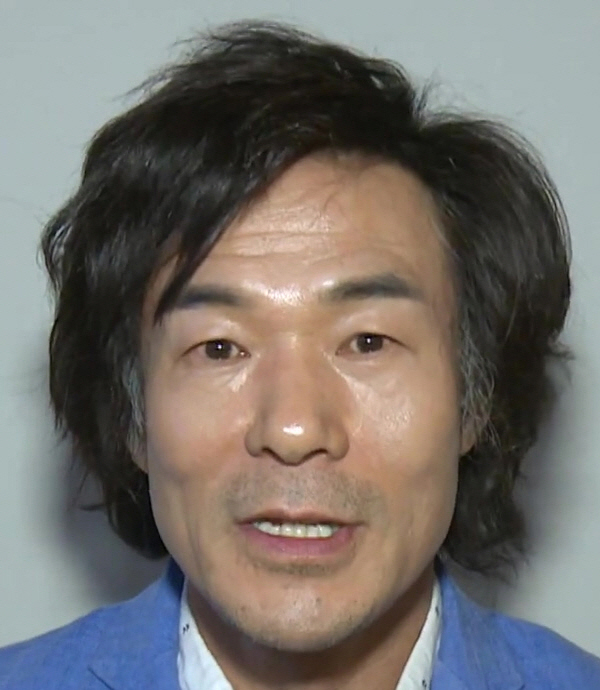
- Oh in 2016
- Born: August 28, 1962 (age 64); Busan, South Korea
- Occupation: Actor
- Years active: 1982–present
- Agent: SidusHQ

Korean name
- Hangul: 오광록
- Hanja: 吳光祿
- RR: O Gwangrok
- MR: O Kwangnok

Oh Kwang-rok (Korean: 오광록; born August 28, 1962) is a South Korean character actor.

== Early life ==
Oh Kwang-rok was born on August 28, 1962. He developed an interest in dancing during his youth, attributing his early creative influence to observing his older brother and sister. While in middle school, he aspired to become a poet, a goal influenced by his Korean language teacher. He honed a critical perspective on society by reading newspaper editorials and columns.

Oh's transition into acting began following a recommendation from his high school friend, the poet Nam Ho-seop. While preparing for university entrance exams, Oh responded to a recruitment advertisement for theater actors. He subsequently joined the Samil-ro Warehouse Theater, where he became a member of the inaugural class of the Actors' Academy. His formal training was conducted under the tutelage of prominent theater figures, including Lee Won-kyung, Lee Hae-rang, and Kim Dong-won.

== Career ==
Oh made his professional debut in a 1982 production of Death of a Salesman, beginning a period of nearly two decades dedicated primarily to the theater. During this time, he became a founding member of the theater company Wanjamunui. His creative contributions extended beyond acting; for instance, he provided the poster illustrations and calligraphy for Park Geun-hyung’s 1991 production of Chunhyang. He gained significant critical attention for his role in the play Lie to Me, a production that generated public discourse regarding the boundaries between artistic expression and obscenity. Other notable stage performances include The Naughty Guys and the title role in Roberto Zucco.

Oh transitioned into film with roles in short features such as The End of April and The World You See When You Close Your Eyes. He became a recognizable figure in South Korean cinema through his portrayal of Hyun-gu in Waikiki Brothers (2001) and subsequent appearances in high-profile projects like Sympathy for Mr. Vengeance (2002) and Oldboy (2003). His casting in The Last Wolf (2004) was influenced by his unique nasal tone, which caught the attention of Director Koo Ja-hong during the production of Oldboy.

His later filmography includes Do You Like Spring Bears? (2003) and My Brother (2004), where he played a photography teacher nicknamed "Human Sleeping Pill."

Following this, he starred in the 2006 film A Cruel Attendance (Chanhokhan Chulgun), directed by Kim Tae-yoon. The plot centers on the irony of a kidnapper's daughter being kidnapped. Oh played the father of the high school girl (Go Eun-ah) who is abducted by Tong-chul (Kim Soo-ro) and Man-ho (Lee Sun-kyun), two desperate men attempting to solve their financial troubles through a clumsy kidnapping.

In 2010, Oh was triple-cast in the lead role of Hahn Young-jin, alongside Lee Young-ha and Kim Chang-wan, in the play A Nap. Directed by filmmaker Hur Jin-ho and based on a short story by Park Min-gyu, the play was the second project in the "Director Comes to the Stage" series. The narrative explores a lifelong romance between the shy Young-jin and his first love, Yi-sun, alternating between the past and their twilight years. The younger version of Young-jin was portrayed by Kim Ki-bum.

Oh collaborated with director Park Chan-wook and video artist Park Chan-kyong in 2011 for the short film Night Fishing, starring opposite Lee Jung-hyun. The 30-minute film, which won the Golden Bear for Best Short Film at the 61st Berlin International Film Festival, follows a fisherman who encounters a shamanic woman in the middle of the night. Notably, the production was shot entirely on an iPhone 4. In the same year, Oh transitioned into directing with the film A Pale Purple Bird. The work served as the opening film for the 3rd Seoul International Extreme-Short Image & Film Festival (SESIFF) held in Guro, Seoul.

Oh also appeared in Park Chul-soo's final film, the omnibus Active Life, alongside Oh In-hye and Kim Sung-min. Released after the director's passing in 2013, the film explored controversial themes involving crime and social taboos.

== Personal life ==
In 2009, Oh was arrested for smoking marijuana.

== Filmography ==
=== Film ===
| Year | Title | Role | Notes |
|---|---|---|---|
| 1996 | The World That I See With Closed Eyes | | |
| 2000 | The End of April | | Short film |
| 2001 | Waikiki Brothers | Hyun-gu | |
| 2002 | Sympathy for Mr. Vengeance | Anarchist | |
| 2003 | Spring Bears Love | | |
| 2003 | Oldboy | Suicidal man | |
| 2004 | The Wolf Returns | Eagle | |
| 2004 | A Moment to Remember | Bum at station | |
| 2005 | How Does the Blind Dream? | The blind | Short film |
| 2005 | She's on Duty | Bae Doo-sang | |
| 2005 | A Bittersweet Life | | |
| 2005 | Sympathy for Lady Vengeance | Se-hyun's father | |
| 2005 | Mr. Socrates | | Special appearance |
| 2005 | Boy Goes to Heaven | | |
| 2006 | Vampire Cop Ricky | Vampire Hunter | |
| 2006 | Maundy Thursday | Death row inmate 2896 | |
| 2006 | A Cruel Attendance | | |
| 2007 | The Elephant on the Bike | Dong-gyu's father | |
| 2007 | Seven Days | Yang Chang-goo | |
| 2008 | Like Father, Like Son | Hyun-jin | Special appearance |
| 2008 | Baby and I | Kwang-rok | |
| 2009 | Marine Boy | Doctor Park | |
| 2009 | Why Did You Come to My House? | Suicide man | Special appearance |
| 2009 | Take Off | Pharmacist | |
| 2009 | The Case of Itaewon Homicide | Attorney Kim Byeon | |
| 2009 | The End | | Short film |
| 2010 | Man of Vendetta | GPS technician | |
| 2010 | No Doubt | Professir Kim | Special appearance |
| 2011 | Night Fishing | Oh Kee-seok | Short film |
| 2011 | Countdown | Dr. Song | |
| 2011 | Endless Joke | | Short film |
| 2011 | Persimmon | | |
| 2011 | Always | Park Chang-soo | |
| 2011 | Sunday Punch | Geun-seok | |
| 2012 | Dangerously Excited | Bob Dylan | Special appearance |
| 2012 | The Spies | Man on bench | Special appearance |
| 2012 | The Decisive One Shot | | |
| 2013 | Eating, Talking, Faucking | Jo Mool-joo | |
| 2013 | Born to Sing | Section chief Maeng | |
| 2013 | Mai Ratima | Junk shop owner | Special appearance |
| 2013 | Killer Toon | Chief detective | |
| 2013 | Rough Play | Jo Kang-ho | |
| 2013 | 11 A.M. | Doctor Seo | |
| 2014 | God's Eye View | Jo Yo-han | |
| 2014 | The Stone | Lee Soo | Special appearance |
| 2014 | My Sister | Detective Kim | |
| 2014 | The Con Artists | Professor Min | Special appearance |
| 2015 | Five Senses of Love | | |
| 2015 | Alice in Earnestland | Art professor | |
| 2015 | My Sister, the Pig Lady | Jae-hwa's father | |
| 2016 | If You Were Me | Dr. Kim | |
| 2016 | Rock N Roll Grandpa | | |
| 2017 | The Tooth and the Nail | Theater owner | Special appearance |
| 2017 | Warriors of the Dawn | Pockmark | |
| 2018 | Beautiful Days | Zhen Chen's father | |
| 2022 | Return to Seoul | Freddy's biological father | |

=== Television series ===
| Year | Title | Role | Notes/Ref. |
|---|---|---|---|
| 2006 | Dr. Kkang | Dr. Bong | |
| 2007 | If in Love... Like Them | | |
| 2007 | The Legend | Hyeon-go | |
| 2008 | Formidable Rivals | Cha Gwang-soo | |
| 2011 | Vampire Idol | Kwang-rok | |
| 2012 | Faith | Fortune teller | (cameo, episode 1) |
| 2012 | Short Family | Kwang-rok | |
| 2013 | Empress Ki | Heuk-soo | (cameo) |
| 2014 | High School King of Savvy | Choi Jang-ho | |
| 2014 | Love Cells | Seo Rin's manager | |
| 2014 | Healer | Ki Young-jae | |
| 2015 | The Invincible Lady Cha | Oh Dal-soo | |
| 2016 | Page Turner | Street vendor | |
| 2017 | Tomorrow, with You | Shin Sung-gyu | |
| 2017 | Drama Stage: Assistant Manager Park's Private Life | | one act-drama |
| 2018 | Devilish Charm | Joo Man-sik | |
| 2020 | Extracurricular | Jae-ik | |
| 2021 | Melancholia | Ji Hyun-wook | |
| 2022 | A Model Family | Park Deuk-soo | |
| 2022–2023 | Island | Butler Jang | |
| 2024 | Uncle Samsik | Joo In-tae | |

== Theater ==
| Year | Title |
|---|---|
| 2010 | A Nap |

== Accolades ==
| Award | Date of ceremony | Category | Recipient(s) | Result | Ref. |
|---|---|---|---|---|---|
| Asian Film Awards | 2023 | Best Supporting Actor | Return to Seoul | Nominated | |
