= Bravo My Life =

2017 South Korean television series

- Promotional poster
- Hangul: 브라보 마이 라이프
- RR: Beurabo mai raipeu
- MR: Pŭrabo mai raip'ŭ
- Genre: Family; Melodrama
- Created by: Hong Chang-uk
- Written by: Jung Ji-woo
- Directed by: Jung Hyo
- Starring: Do Ji-won; Park Sang-min; Yeon Jung-hoon; Jeong Yu-mi; Hyun Woo; Kang Ji-sub
- Country of origin: South Korea
- Original language: Korean
- No. of episodes: 56 (Note: In order to circumvent Korean laws that prevent commercial breaks in the middle of an episode, what would previously have been aired as two 70 minute episodes are now being repackaged as four 35 minute episodes, with four episodes being shown each night with three commercial breaks.) (Note: Originally planned for 60 episodes, the series was shortened by four episodes in lieu of two pre-empts and the 2018 Winter Olympics.)

Production
- Executive producer: Yoon Ha-rim
- Producer: SBS Production
- Running time: 35 minutes
- Production companies: Studio Dragon; Hwa&Dam Pictures

Original release
- Network: SBS TV
- Release: October 21, 2017 – February 3, 2018

Bravo My Life (Korean: 브라보 마이 라이프) is a 2017 South Korean television series starring Do Ji-won, Park Sang-min, Yeon Jung-hoon, Jeong Yu-mi, Hyun Woo, and Kang Ji-sub. The series airs four consecutive episodes on Saturday on SBS TV from 8:55 p.m. to 11:15 p.m. (KST) starting from October 21, 2017.

== Synopsis ==
The story is set in the world of television drama production, and revolves around three main characters: a haughty drama PD, an assistant director who's still waiting to catch her big break, and a frustrated actor who still hasn't debuted after seven years in the industry.

== Cast ==
=== Main ===
- Jeong Yu-mi as Ha Do-na

An assistant director who is passionate and enthusiastic about her work to the point of being nicknamed "Lunatic". She is still waiting for the day when she can become a full-fledged director.

- Hyun Woo as Kim Bum-woo

An actor who has been in the industry for seven years but has yet to catch his big break as his anxiety in front of cameras hinders his acting during the final cut. He has mostly been cast in nameless or bit-part roles and works several other part-time jobs on the side. He falls in love with Do-na after meeting her when she was assigned to help him overcome his anxiety.

- Kang Ji-sub as Seol Do-hyun

A famous actor whom Do-na was assigned to as a production assistant. He notices Do-na and develops feelings for her.

- Do Ji-won as Song Mi-ja/Rara

Young-woong's wife and a former actress. She now lives the high life as the wife of a chaebol but has been hiding a painful secret.

- Park Sang-min as Jung Young-woong

Chairman of Juvis (JU) Group and husband of Song Mi-ja

- Yeon Jung-hoon as Shin Dong-woo

A television director well known for being a workaholic. He only focuses on his work and does not believe in forming friendships, often being extremely curt with his staff.

=== Supporting ===
==== JU Group ====
- Park Seon-im as Jung Hye-mi
- Hyun Jyu-ni as Jung Sung-ah, daughter of Chairman Jung and Song Mi-ja who eschews her life as an heiress and would rather become a singer

==== JT Group ====
- Dokgo Young-jae as Kim Ho-tae
- Kim Hye-sun as Choi Min-kyung
- Kang Sung-min as Kim Joon-ho
- Jiyul as Kim Seo-hyun

==== People in SBC Drama company ====
- Shin Joo-ah as Kang Ha-young
- Jeon Se-hyun as Kang Ha-kyung
- Kim Joon-hyun as Yoo Gil-joon
- Kim Kiri as Chul-seon
- Joo Sung-hwan as Drama Department Head

==== People around Do-na ====
- Ban Hyo-jung as Park Sun-jin
- Ha Jae-sook as Lee Young-hee

==== People around Dong-woo ====
- Park Hyun-sook as Shin Hwa-im, a veteran actress and Dong-woo's paternal aunt

==== People around Do-hyun ====
- Kwon Oh-joong as Kim Oh-book
- Kim Noo-ri as Man-soo

== Ratings ==
Average TV viewership ratings
Ep.	Original broadcast date	Average audience share			
Ep.	Original broadcast date	TNmS		Nielsen Korea	
Ep.	Original broadcast date	Nationwide	Seoul	Nationwide	Seoul
1	October 21, 2017	7.9% (11th)	8.4% (7th)	7.5% (11th)	8.2% (9th)
2	October 21, 2017	8.0% (10th)	8.5% (6th)	7.9% (10th)	8.7% (8th)
3	October 21, 2017	8.5% (8th)	9.1% (4th)	8.6% (6th)	9.2% (6th)
4	October 21, 2017	7.8% (12th)	8.5% (5th)	8.9% (7th)	9.5% (5th)
5	October 28, 2017	5.6% (NR)	5.5% (16th)	6.2% (14th)	7.0% (13th)
6	October 28, 2017	5.6% (NR)	5.5% (15th)	6.6% (11th)	7.6% (7th)
7	October 28, 2017	5.4% (NR)	6.0% (NR)	6.1% (17th)	6.7% (9th)
8	October 28, 2017	4.9% (NR)	5.7% (NR)	6.1% (17th)	6.9% (11th)
9	November 4, 2017	5.2% (NR)	6.3% (NR)	6.9% (10th)	7.9% (9th)
10	November 4, 2017	5.1% (NR)	6.5% (NR)	6.9% (10th)	8.3% (8th)
11	November 4, 2017	5.4% (20th)	6.1% (NR)	7.5% (8th)	8.4% (7th)
12	November 4, 2017	5.6% (17th)	5.8% (17th)	7.5% (8th)	8.6% (6th)
13	November 11, 2017	5.3% (NR)	6.6% (NR)	7.3% (9th)	8.5% (7th)
14	November 11, 2017	6.2% (16th)	6.4% (9th)	7.2% (10th)	8.3% (8th)
15	November 11, 2017	5.9% (18th)	6.1% (13th)	6.9% (14th)	7.9% (9th)
16	November 11, 2017	5.3% (NR)	5.9% (NR)	6.8% (15th)	7.4% (10th)
17	November 18, 2017	5.4% (NR)	5.5% (20th)	6.3% (17th)	7.2% (13th)
18	November 18, 2017	6.0% (18th)	6.4% (14th)	7.3% (11th)	8.1% (10th)
19	November 18, 2017	5.7% (NR)	6.6% (10th)	7.9% (8th)	9.1% (6th)
20	November 18, 2017	6.0% (19th)	6.6% (11th)	7.6% (16th)	8.6% (9th)
21	December 2, 2017 (Note: No episodes aired on November 25 due to the broadcast of the 38th Blue Dragon Film Awards ceremony.)	5.6% (20th)	5.9% (17th)	7.4% (16th)	8.7% (12th)
22	December 2, 2017	6.7% (16th)	6.9% (13th)	8.3% (13th)	9.4% (10th)
23	December 2, 2017	6.9% (14th)	7.3% (10th)	8.7% (9th)	9.9% (6th)
24	December 2, 2017	6.9% (13th)	7.4% (9th)	8.6% (10th)	9.6% (9th)
25	December 9, 2017	6.1% (17th)	6.0% (17th)	6.5% (18th)	7.4% (15th)
26	December 9, 2017	6.7% (15th)	7.0% (9th)	7.4% (11th)	8.1% (9th)
27	December 9, 2017	5.6% (20th)	6.3% (15th)	7.1% (14th)	8.1% (9th)
28	December 9, 2017	5.9% (19th)	6.9% (11th)	7.1% (14th)	8.0% (11th)
29	December 16, 2017	5.3% (NR)	6.4% (NR)	6.6% (18th)	7.6% (15th)
30	December 16, 2017	5.7% (19th)	5.6% (16th)	6.9% (16th)	7.9% (13th)
31	December 16, 2017	6.0% (18th)	5.6% (18th)	7.1% (14th)	8.3% (9th)
32	December 16, 2017	5.6% (20th)	5.4% (19th)	7.0% (15th)	8.0% (11th)
33	December 23, 2017	4.4% (NR)	5.3% (NR)	6.1% (18th)	7.1% (14th)
34	December 23, 2017	4.8% (NR)	6.0%	6.4% (16th)	7.6% (12th)
35	December 23, 2017	5.0% (NR)	5.9%	6.0% (NR)	7.0% (15th)
36	December 23, 2017	5.0% (NR)	6.1%	6.9% (15th)	8.0% (10th)
37	January 6, 2018 (Note: No episodes aired on December 30 due to the broadcast of the 2017 SBS Drama Awards ceremony.)	5.1% (NR)	6.3%	6.2% (19th)	7.2% (18th)
38	January 6, 2018	5.5% (NR)	6.7%	6.2% (19th)	7.3% (17th)
39	January 6, 2018	6.3% (16th)	7.5%	6.6% (17th)	7.8% (15th)
40	January 6, 2018	6.3% (16th)	7.6%	6.7% (16th)	7.9% (14th)
41	January 13, 2018	4.7% (NR)	5.8%	5.9% (NR)	6.9% (20th)
42	January 13, 2018	5.5% (NR)	6.7%	6.5% (NR)	7.5% (17th)
43	January 13, 2018	6.1% (NR)	7.2%	6.6% (19th)	7.6% (16th)
44	January 13, 2018	6.5% (16th)	7.8%	6.7% (18th)	7.9% (11th)
45	January 20, 2018	4.3% (NR)	5.5%	6.2% (19th)	7.4% (15th)
46	January 20, 2018	4.8% (NR)	5.6%	6.7% (17th)	7.6% (12th)
47	January 20, 2018	5.5% (19th)	6.7%	7.2% (13th)	8.3% (10th)
48	January 20, 2018	5.6% (18th)	6.8%	7.1% (15th)	8.1% (11th)
49	January 27, 2018	5.3% (NR)	5.8%	5.7% (NR)	6.2% (NR)
50	January 27, 2018	6.0% (19th)	6.6%	6.4% (17th)	7.0% (16th)
51	January 27, 2018	6.2% (17th)	7.1%	6.9% (14th)	7.8% (12th)
52	January 27, 2018	6.5% (16th)	7.4%	6.8% (15th)	7.7% (11th)
53	February 3, 2018	4.7% (NR)	5.8%	5.5% (NR)	6.5% (NR)
54	February 3, 2018	6.3% (20th)	7.2%	7.0% (17th)	7.9% (13th)
55	February 3, 2018	6.0% (NR)	6.9%	7.1% (16th)	8.0% (12th)
56	February 3, 2018	6.1% (NR)	7.2%	6.8% (18th)	7.9% (13th)
Average		5.8%	— (Note: Due to some unpublished ratings, the exact average rating is unknown.)	6.9%	—
In the above table, the blue numbers represent the lowest ratings and the red numbers represent the highest ratings.; NR denotes that the drama did not rank in the top 20 daily rankings.; N/A denotes that the rating is not known.

== Awards and nominations ==
Year	Award	Category	Nominee	Result	Ref.
2017	25th SBS Drama Awards	Top Excellence Award, Actress in a Daily/Weekend Drama	Do Ji-won	Nominated	
2017	25th SBS Drama Awards	Excellence Award, Actor in a Daily/Weekend Drama	Park Sang-min	Nominated	
2017	25th SBS Drama Awards	Excellence Award, Actress in a Daily/Weekend Drama	Jeong Yu-mi	Nominated	
2018	6th APAN Star Awards	Top Excellence Award, Actress in a Serial Drama	Do Ji-won	Nominated	
