= Shin Rin-ah =

South Korean actress (born 2009)

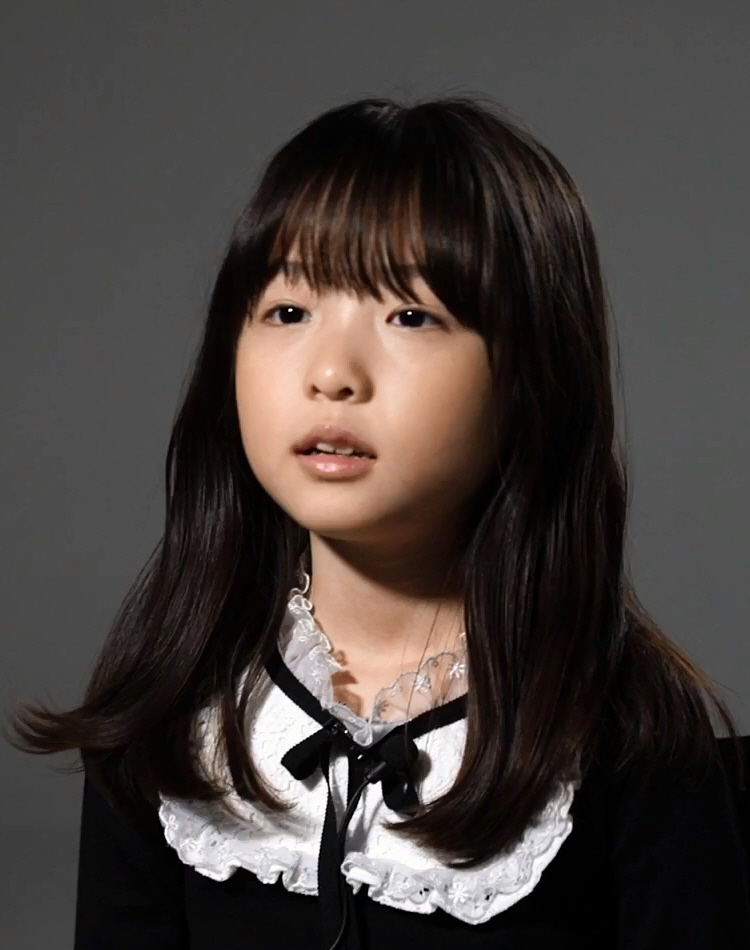
- Shin in 2017
- Born: May 14, 2009 (age 16); South Korea
- Occupation: Actress
- Years active: 2014–present
- Agent: IOK Company

Korean name
- Hangul: 신린아
- RR: Sin Rina
- MR: Sin Rina

Shin Rin-ah (Korean: 신린아; born May 14, 2009) is a South Korean actress.

== Filmography ==
=== Film ===
Year	Title	Role	Ref.
2014	Ode to My Father	young Yoon Mak-Soon	
2015	Bad Man	Han Yeon-Woo	
2016	The Last Princess	young Princess Deokhye	
2017	The Mimic	Girl	
2017	Memoir of a Murderer	young Eun-Hee	
2018	The Nightmare	Ye-Rim	

=== Television series ===
Year	Title	Role	Notes	Ref.
2014	Jang Bo-ri Is Here!	Young-sook's daughter		
2014	Endless Love	Esther		
2014	My Spring Days	young Kang Poo-reum		
2015	Enchanting Neighbor	Park Se-bom		
2015	My Heart Twinkle Twinkle	young Lee Soon-jung		
2015	Splendid Politics	young Kim Gae-shi		
2015	This Is My Love	Yoo Min-ah		
2015	Mrs. Cop	Seo Ha-eun		
2016	Marriage Contract	Cha Eun-seong		
2016–2017	The Legend of the Blue Sea	Seo Yoo-na		
2017	Innocent Defendant	Park Ha-yeon		
2017	Live Up to Your Name	Yeon-yi		
2017	Madame Jung's One Last Week	Park Eun-mi	Drama Special	
2018	Return	Kang Dal-rae		
2018	Lovely Horribly	young Oh Eul-soon		
2018	Hide and Seek	young Soo-a		
2018	Heart Surgeons	Lee Yoon-seo	Cameo	
2019	Item	Kang Da-in		
2021	Gumiho Recipe	Kim So-yeon		

== Awards and nominations ==
Name of the award ceremony, year presented, category, nominee of the award, and the result of the nomination
Award ceremony	Year	Category	Nominee / Work	Result	Ref.
KBS Drama Awards	2017	Best Young Actress	Madame Jung's One Last Week	Nominated	
KBS Drama Awards	2018	Best Young Actress	Lovely Horribly	Nominated	
MBC Drama Awards	2016	Best Young Actress	Marriage Contract	Nominated	
SBS Drama Awards	2017	Youth Acting Award	Innocent Defendant	Nominated	
