= We Don't Bite: Villains in the Countryside =

South Korean television show

- Promotional Poster
- Hangul: 해치지 않아
- Lit.: Won't Hurt You
- RR: Haechiji ana
- MR: Haech'iji ana
- Genre: Reality, Variety
- Directed by: Kim Sang-ah
- Starring: Um Ki-joon; Yoon Jong-hoon; Bong Tae-gyu
- Country of origin: South Korea
- Original language: Korean
- No. of seasons: 1
- No. of episodes: 11

Production
- Executive producer: Kim Yoo-geun
- Production location: South Korea
- Running time: 70 minutes

Original release
- Network: tvN tvN Asia
- Release: September 28 – December 7, 2021

Related
- The Penthouse: War in Life

We Don't Bite: Villains in the Countryside (Korean: 해치지 않아) is a South Korean reality show program on tvN with Um Ki-joon, Yoon Jong-hoon and Bong Tae-gyu as the main cast members. The show aired on tvN every Tuesday at 20:40 (KST) starting from September 28, 2021. It also aired on tvN Asia starting from October 11, 2021, and subsequently every Monday at 22:30 (UTC+08:00).

== Synopsis ==
The 3 cast members spend their rest times in a deserted house located at a countryside. During their stay, they will be revamping the house to make it more hospitable for them to stay and to host their guests. They will also be welcoming various guests (mostly the actors and actresses who've the cast members worked together with in the popular drama series The Penthouse: War in Life whom they thank for.

== Episodes ==
=== 2021 ===
List of episodes in 2021 (episode 1–present)

Ep.	Air Date	Guest	Ref.
1	September 28	No guest	
2	October 5	Lee Ji-ah, Han Ji-hyun, Kim Young-dae	
3	October 12	Park Ki-woong	
4	October 19	Park Ki-woong, Kim So-yeon, Choi Ye-bin	
5	October 26	Park Ki-woong, Kim So-yeon, Choi Ye-bin	
6	November 2	Ha Do-kwon, On Joo-wan, Kim Dong-kyu	
7	November 9	Ha Do-kwon, On Joo-wan, Kim Dong-kyu	
8	November 16	Ha Do-kwon, On Joo-wan, Kim Dong-kyu, Yoon Joo-hee	
9	November 23	Yoon Joo-hee, Eugene, Kim Hyun-soo	
10	November 30	Yoon Joo-hee, Eugene, Kim Hyun-soo	
Special	December 7	Lee Ji-ah, Ha Do-kwon	

== Ratings ==
- Ratings listed below are the individual corner ratings of We Don't Bite: Villains in the Countryside. (Note: Individual corner ratings do not include commercial time, which regular ratings include.)
- In the ratings below, the highest rating for the show will be in red and the lowest rating for the show will be in blue each year.

=== 2021 ===
List of episodes in 2021 (episode 1–present)
We Don't Bite: Villains in the Countryside : South Korea viewers per episode (thousands)

Season	Episode number											Average
Season	1	2	3	4	5	6	7	8	9	10	11	Average
1	852	808	857	841	686	858	820	728	786	917	654	801

Source: Audience measurement performed nationwide by Nielsen Media Research.

Ep. #	Original Airdate	Nielsen Korea Ratings Nationwide
1	September 28	3.485%
2	October 5	3.262%
3	October 12	3.369%
4	October 19	3.434%
5	October 26	2.568%
6	November 2	3.419%
7	November 9	3.357%
8	November 16	2.924%
9	November 23	3.046%
10	November 30	3.701%
11	December 7	2.667%
