= Um Ki-joon =

South Korean actor (born 1976)

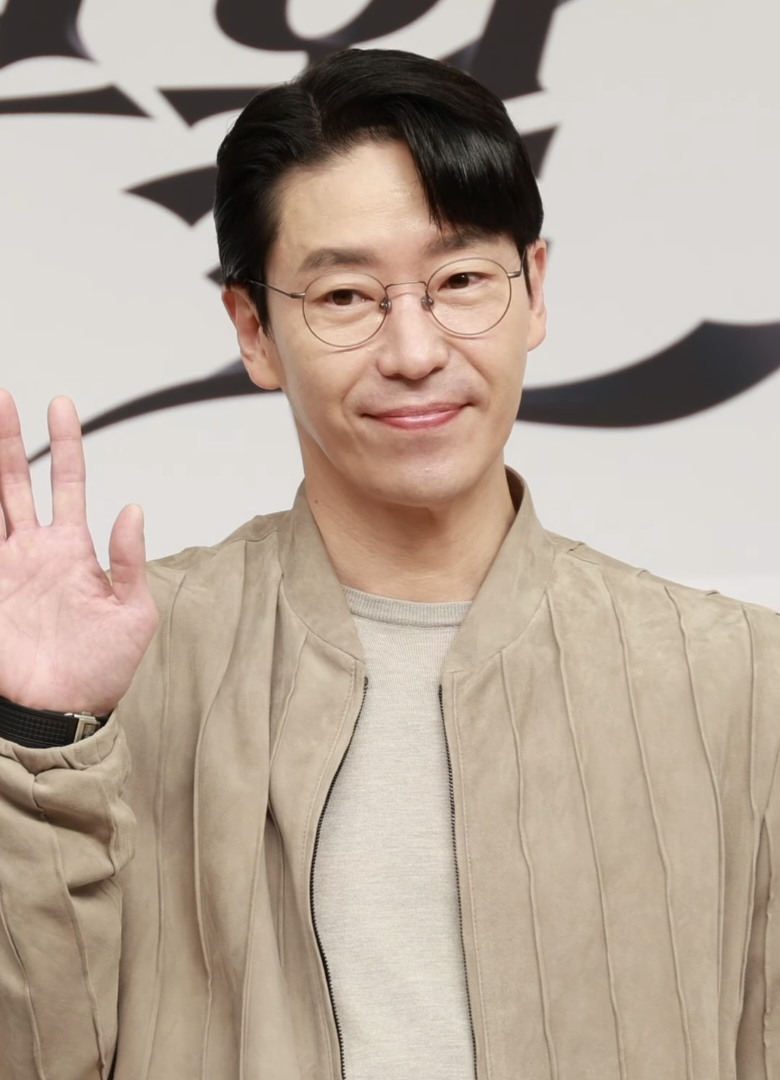
- Um in March 2024
- Born: March 23, 1976 (age 50); Seoul, South Korea
- Occupation: Actor
- Years active: 1995–present
- Agent: Suntree Entertainment
- Height: 180 cm (5 ft 11 in)
- Spouse: Unknown (m. 2024)

Korean name
- Hangul: 엄기준
- Hanja: 嚴基俊
- RR: Eom Gijun
- MR: Ŏm Kijun
- Website: umkijoon.com

Um Ki-joon (Korean: 엄기준; born March 23, 1976) is a South Korean actor. He made his acting debut in 1995 in the stage play Richard III, though he later became best known as a musical theatre actor, starring in Singin' in the Rain, The Sorrows of Young Werther, Grease, The Three Musketeers, Jack the Ripper, The Count of Monte Cristo, Catch Me If You Can, and Rebecca. He also appeared in the Patrick Marber play Closer. Um's popularity increased after he began playing supporting roles in television dramas such as Life Special Investigation Team, Worlds Within, Hero, Dream High, Scent of a Woman and Phantom. He was also the leading actor in Good Job, Good Job and The Virus. He is best known for his roles in television series I'm Not a Robot (2017–2018), The Penthouse: War in Life (2020–2021) and Little Women (2022).

== Career ==
Um made his acting debut in 1995 in the stage play Richard III. After his discharge from the military in 1998, he faced a period of obscurity in Daehakro, taking on various roles in both large and small productions, starting with the musical "Gwanggaeto the Great." However, it was in the musical in Singin' in the Rain, where his true talent shone, propelling him to stardom with his portrayal of Dong-hyeon. Subsequently, he appeared in productions such as The Sorrows of Young Werther, Grease and Hedwig and the Angry Inch.

In 2004, Um made a return to the theater stage with play Male Impulse.

In 2006, Um made his television debut in Drama City - Who Loved Her? directed by Lee So-yeon. The following year, he worked with Lee So-yeon again in Drama City - The Grim Reaper with Amnesia. Um also appeared in Kimchi Cheese Smile, as Ki-jun, Shin Goo's eldest son, who rents the second floor of his friend Byeong-jin's house. He is a man with a sly personality who is messy at home and neat and tidy outside.

In 2008, Um worked with Lee So-yeon again in Drama City - Secret, Only You Don't Know. He played the role of unknown artist Park Hyeong-joo, who is torn between his beloved wife and his male lover. Um became a TV star as the charming and grumpy boy Son Gyu-ho in the drama Worlds Within.

In 2009, Um made a return to the theater stage with Maxim Gorky's play The Lower Depths which features characters from the lower echelons of society including a fallen nobleman, a woman suffering from a terminal lung disease, and an alcoholic actor, he takes on the role of Satine, a once-intellectual turned conman. The play is set in Russia during the 1890s, a time marked by increasing social disparity and economic depression. It was performed at the Seoul Arts Center Towol Theater from February 14 to March 22.

In 2010, Monte Christo.

Um played the villain in his first film Man of Vendetta, opposite Kim Myung-min. This was followed by a role as Lee Ki-cheol, a detective investigating serial murders in horror film Killer Toon, opposite Lee Si-young.

In 2016, Musical Matahari.

In 2017, Um played the villain in the hit legal thriller Innocent Defendant.

In 2018, he reunited with the director and writer of Innocent Defendant in medical drama Heart Surgeons.

In 2020, he appeared in TV series The Penthouse: War in Life as Joo Dan-tae, the main villain and a scheming real estate genius. The series aired on SBS TV from October 26.

Um reprised in his role of Werther in the 20th anniversary of the Korean musical "Werther".

In 2021, Um signed a contract with Your Entertainment. It was founded by a manager who has been with him since his debut.

In 2023, He appeared in 10th anniversary of musical The Days.

== Personal life ==
In May 2024, it was reported that Um will tie the knot with a non-celebrity partner in December. The couple married on December 22 in Seoul.

== Filmography ==
=== Film ===
Year	Title	Role	Notes	Ref.
2010	Man of Vendetta	Choi Byeong-chul		
2010	Villain and Widow	Representative Ha	Cameo appearance	
2010	Finding Mr. Destiny	Kim Jong-wook	Cameo appearance	
2013	Killer Toon	Lee Ki-cheol		
2022	It's Alright		TVING Shorts Film	
2026	Tokyo Burst: Crime City		Japanese–Korean film	

=== Television series ===
Year	Title	Role	Notes	Ref.
2006	Drama City: "Who Loved Her?"	Park Cheol-ho		
2007	Drama City: "Grim Reaper with Amnesia"	Dong-wook		
2007	Kimchi Cheese Smile	Um Ki-joon		
2008	Drama City: "Secret, Only You Don't Know"	Park Hyeong-joo		
2008	Life Special Investigation Team	Park Chan-ho		
2008	Worlds Within	Song Gyu-ho		
2009	Good Job, Good Job	Choi Seung-hyun		
2009	Hero	Kang Hye-sung		
2011	Dream High	Kang Oh-hyuk		
2011	Miss Ripley	Prosecutor	Cameo (episode 14)	
2011	Scent of a Woman	Chae Eun-suk		
2011	Can't Lose	Cha Seok-hoon	Cameo (episodes 14–17)	
2012	Phantom	Jo Hyun-min		
2013	The Virus	Lee Myung-hyun		
2013	I Can Hear Your Voice	Public defender Um Ki-joon	Cameo (episode 14)	
2014	Golden Cross	Michael Jang		
2015	The Man in the Mask	Kang Hyun-woong		
2017	Innocent Defendant	Cha Sun-ho / Cha Min-ho		
2017	I'm Not a Robot	Hong Baek-kyun		
2018	Heart Surgeons	Choi Suk-han		
2020–2021	The Penthouse: War in Life	Joo Dan-tae / Baek Jun-gi	Season 1–3	
2022	Shooting Stars	Yoon Jang-seok	Cameo (episode 13)	
2022	Little Women	Park Jae-sang		
2023–2024	The Escape of the Seven	Matthew Lee / K / Sim Jun Seok		

=== Web series ===
Year	Title	Role	Ref.
2016	Nightmare Teacher	Han Bong-gu	

=== Television show ===
Year	Title	Role	Notes	Ref.
2017–2018	Wizard of Nowhere	Cast Member		
2021	We Don't Bite: Villains in the Countryside	Cast Member	with Yoon Jong-hoon and Bong Tae-gyu	
2025	Before It's Too Late ShalaShala	Cast Member	with Sung Dong-Il Kim Kwang-kyu Shin Seung-hwan and Jang Hyuk	

=== Music video appearances ===
Year	Song Title	Korean Title	Artist	Ref.
2007	"Goodbye, 20 Years Old"	안녕, 스무살	Toy	
2007	"Three People"	세 사람	Lee Ki-chan	
2015	"April Snow"	사월의 눈	Huh Gak	

== Stage ==
=== Concerts ===
Concert performances
Year	Title		Role	Theater	Date	Ref.
Year	English	Korean	Role	Theater	Date	Ref.
2007	Hedwig Concert with John Cameron Mitchell	존 카메론 미첼과 함께하는 헤드윅 콘서트	Hedwig	Jamsil Indoor Gymnasium	May 27 – June 5	
2014	Eom-Yu-Min-Beop Premium One Concert	엄유민법 프리미엄 원(premium one) 콘서트		Bunkamura Orchard Hall in Tokyo	September 29–30	

=== Musical ===
Musical play performances
Year	Title		Role	Venue	Date	Ref.
Year	English	Korean	Role	Venue	Date	Ref.
1996	Oliver!	올리버	—N/a	—N/a		
1998	Gwanggaeto the Great	광개토대왕	Ensemble cast	Seoul Arts Center Towol Theater	December 21	
2000	Tripitaka Koreana	팔만대장경	Mongolian army	National Theater; Fukuoka Acuros Theater; Yokohama Kanagawa Shomin Hall	June 16–29	
2000	Tripitaka Koreana	팔만대장경	Mongolian army	The cultural center of the Philippines	July 26–27	
2000	Oh! Happy Day	오!해피데이	Eros	Al and Nuclear Theatre	September 15 – December 31	
2001	River of Eternal Love - Tripitaka Koreana, World Cultural Heritage	영원한 사랑의 강 - 세계문화유산 팔만대장경	Mongolian army	Seoul Education and Culture Center	May 1	
2001	Singin' in the Rain	(2001) 서울 아동청소년 공연예술축제; 사랑은 비를 타고	Don Lockwood	Information Theater	July 4 – October 3	
2002	The Sorrows of Young Werther	젊은 베르테르의 슬픔	Werther	Chamber Hall, Sejong Centre for the Performing Arts	February 8 – March 24	
2002	Songshan Nights	송산야화	Kim Hyun	Culture Ilbo Hall	June 18–28	
2002	Songshan Nights	송산야화	Kim Hyun	Culture Ilbo Hall	August 16–21	
2002	Carmen	카르멘	Escamillo	Culture Ilbo Hall	December 13–26	
2003	Grease	그리스	Danny Zuko	Polymedia Theater in Daehakro, Seoul	May 20–June 1	
2003	Grease	그리스	Danny Zuko	Seoul Arts Center's Towol Theater	June 7–29	
2003	Grease	그리스	Danny Zuko	Dongsoong Art Center Dongsoong Hall	August 8–November 16	
2003–2004	The Sorrows of Young Werther	베르테르	Werther	C-art Arts Theater	December 12 – February 29	
2003	Grease	그리스	Danny Zuko	Daegu Citizens Center Auditorium	December 20	
2004	Singin' in the Rain	패션 오브 더 레인	Dong-hyeon (Don Lockwood)	Daehakro Inkel Art Hall Hall 1	December 3	
2004	Anakji Love Story	안악지애사	King Hoyang	Concert hall COEX Auditorium	September 10 – October 2	
2005	Assassins	암살자들	Booth	Seoul Arts Center CJ Towol Theater	July 9 – 30, 2005	
2005	Grease	그리스	Danny Zuko	Dongsoong Art Center Dongsoong Hall	October 1, 2005 – January 1, 2006	
2005	Love Diary	러브 다이어리	—	National Museum of Korea Theatre Dragon	December 26–31	
2005–2006	Hedwig and the Angry Inch	헤드윅	Hedwig	Daehak-ro Live Theater	November 1 – February 26	
2006	The Sorrows of Young Werther	젊은 베르테르의 슬픔	Werther	Arko Arts Theatre Grand Theatre	January 20 – February 19	
2006	Le Passe-Muraille	벽을 뚫는 남자	Dusoleil	Seoul Arts Centre CJ Towol Theatre	February 28 – April 2	
2006	Finding Kim Jong-wook	김종욱 찾기	Man/Kim Jong-wook	JTN Art Hall 1	June 2–August 15	
2006	Grease	그리스	Danny Zuko	National Theatre Haeoreum Theatre	August 24 – September 9	
2006	Grease	그리스	Danny Zuko	Naru Art Centre Grand Performance Hall	November 17 – December 25	
2006	Singin' in the Rain	패션 오브 더 레인	Dong-hyeon (Don Lockwood)	Universal Art Center	December 29–31	
2007	A Day	하루	Kang Young-won	Universal Art Center	January 6–February 4	
2007–2009	Singin' in the Rain	패션 오브 더 레인	Dong-hyeon (Don Lockwood)	Inkel Art Hall 1	May 1, 2007 – December 31, 2009	
2007	Former Lover	실연남녀	Kang Yeon-oh	Daehak-ro Cultural Space Ida Hall 1	October 13 – December 9	
2008	Former Lover	실연남녀	Kang Yeon-oh	The Good Theatre (old, Theatre)	January 8 to March 3	
2008	Singin' in the Rain	패션 오브 더 레인	Dong-hyeon (Don Lockwood)	Theater Tramp, Tokyo	July 29 – August 17	
2009	The Three Musketeers	삼총사	D'Artagnan	Chungmu Art Hall Grand Theatre	May 12 – June 21	
2009–2010	Jack the Ripper	살인마 잭	Daniel	Universal Art Center	November 13, 2009 – January 31, 2010	
2009–2010	Jack the Ripper	살인마 잭	Daniel	Yeungnam University Cheonma Art Center Grand Hall, Daegu	December 24 – 26, 2009	
2010	Monte Cristo	몬테크리스토	Edmond Dantès	Universal Art Centre	April 21, 2010 – June 13, 2010	
2010	Monte Cristo	몬테크리스토	Edmond Dantès	Daegu Arts Center	June 22 – 27, 2010	
2010	Monte Cristo	몬테크리스토	Edmond Dantès	Gwangju Cultural Center, Daeguk Hall	July 16 – 18, 2010	
2010	Jack the Ripper	살인마 잭	Daniel	Seongnam Art Centre Opera House	July 22 – August 22	
2010	Monte Cristo	몬테크리스토	Edmond Dantès	Busan Citizens' Hall, Main Theater	August 6 – 8, 2010	
2010–2011	The Three Musketeers	삼총사	d'Artagnan	Chungmu Art Center Main Theater	December 15, 2010 – January 30, 2011	
2011	The Three Musketeers	삼총사	d'Artagnan	Daejeon Arts Center Art Hall	February 19 – 20, 2011	
2011	The Three Musketeers	삼총사	d'Artagnan	Daegu Keimyung Art Center	February 26 – 27, 2011	
2011	Monte Cristo	몬테크리스토	Edmond Dantès	Chungmu Art Center Main Theater, Black	March 1 – April 24, 2011	
2011	The Three Musketeers	삼총사	d'Artagnan	Goyang Aram Nuri Arts Center Aram Theater	March 19 – 20, 2011	
2011	The Three Musketeers	삼총사	d'Artagnan	Gwangju Culture and Arts Center Main Theater	April 8 – 10, 2011	
2011	The Three Musketeers	삼총사	d'Artagnan	Busan Citizens' Hall Main Theater	April 16 – 17, 2011	
2011	Monte Cristo	몬테크리스토	Edmond Dantès	Korea Sound Culture Hall, Chamber Hall, Jeonju	May 14 – 15, 2011	
2011	Monte Cristo	몬테크리스토	Edmond Dantès	Gwangju Cultural Center, Main Theater	May 21 – 22, 2011	
2011	Monte Cristo	몬테크리스토	Edmond Dantès	Gyeonggi Arts Center, Main Theater, Suwon	June 4 – 5, 2011	
2011	Monte Cristo	몬테크리스토	Edmond Dantès	Busan Cultural Center, Main Theater	June 10 – 12, 2011	
2011	Monte Cristo	몬테크리스토	Edmond Dantès	Mokpo Citizens' Culture and Sports Center, Main Theater	July 2 – 3, 2011	
2011	Monte Cristo	몬테크리스토	Edmond Dantès	Jeju Art Center	July 8 – 10, 2011	
2011	Jack the Ripper	살인마 잭	Daniel	Daejeon Arts Centre Art Hall	August 20–21	
2011	Jack the Ripper	살인마 잭	Daniel	Ansan Culture and Arts Centre Sunrise Theatre	October 15–16	
2011	Jack the Ripper	살인마 잭	Daniel	Goyang Aram Nuri Aram Theatre	October 21–30	
2012	Catch Me If You Can	캐치 미 이프 유 캔	Frank Abagnale Jr.	Blue Square Mastercard Hall	March 28 – June 10	
2012	Jack the Ripper	살인마 잭	Daniel	National Theatre Haeoreum Theatre	July 20 – August 25	
2012–2013	Catch Me If You Can	캐치 미 이프 유 캔	Frank Abagnale Jr.	Seongnam Art Centre Opera House	December 14 – February 9	
2013	The Three Musketeers	삼총사	D'Artagnan	Chungmu Art Centre Grand Theatre	February 20 – April 21	
2013	The Count of Monte Cristo	몬테크리스토	Edmond Dantès	Chungmu Art Centre Grand Theatre	June 7 – August 4	
2013	Jack the Ripper	살인마 잭	Daniel	D-Cube Link Art Centre	July 16 – September 29	
2013	Bonnie & Clyde	보니앤클라이드	Clyde Barrow	Chungmu Art Centre Grand Theatre	September 4 – October 27	
2013–2014	Werther	베르테르	Werther	Seoul Arts Center, Towol Theater	December 3–January 12	
2014	The Three Musketeers	삼총사	D'Artagnan	Sejong Centre for the Performing Arts Grand Theatre	March 14–30	
2014	Bonnie & Clyde	보니앤클라이드	Clyde Barrow	Gwanglim Art Centre BBCH Hall	April 15 – June 29	
2014	Rebecca	레베카	Maxim De Winter	Blue Square Shinhan Card Hall	September 6 – November 9	
2014	Rebecca	레베카	Maxim De Winter	Korea Sound Culture Center Moak Hall	November 14–16	
2014	Rebecca	레베카	Maxim De Winter	Daejeon Arts Center Art Hall	November 21–23	
2014	Rebecca	레베카	Maxim De Winter	Daegu Gyeongnam Art Center	December 5–14	
2014	Rebecca	레베카	Maxim De Winter	Centum City Sohyang Theater Shinhan Card Hall	December 19–21	
2014	Rebecca	레베카	Maxim De Winter	Gwangju Culture & Arts Center Main Theater	December 26–28	
2015	Rebecca	레베카	Maxim De Winter	Ansan Culture & Arts Center Haedoji Theater	January 3–4	
2015	Robin Hood	로빈훗	Robin Hood	D Cube Link Art Center	January 23 – March 29	
2015	Robin Hood	로빈훗	Robin Hood	Seongnam Art Centre Opera House	April 19 – May 25	
2015	Cinderella	신데렐라	Prince Christopher	Chungmu Art Hall Grand Theater	September 12 – November 8	
2015–16	Cinderella	신데렐라	Prince Christopher	Seongnam Art Centre Opera House	December 5 – January 3	
2015–2016	15th Anniversary of Werther	베르테르	Werther	Seoul Arts Centre Opera House	November 10–February 13	
2016	15th Anniversary of Werther	베르테르	Werther	Gyemyung Art Centre	January 15–17	
2016	15th Anniversary of Werther	베르테르	Werther	Busan Cultural Centre Grand Theatre	January 29–31	
2016	15th Anniversary of Werther	베르테르	Werther	Daejeon Arts Centre Art Hall	February 12–13	
2016	Rebecca	레베카	Maxim de Winter	Seoul Arts Centre Opera Theatre	January 5 – March 6	
2016	Mata Hari	마타하리	Armand	Blue Square Shinhan Card Hall	March 25 – June 12, 2016	
2016	Jack the Ripper	살인마 잭	Daniel	D-Cube Link Art Centre	July 15 – October 9	
2016–2017	Monte Cristo	몬테크리스토	Edmund Dantes/The Count of Monte Cristo	Chungmu Art Center, Main Theater	November 19, 2016 – February 12, 2017	
2017	Monte Cristo	몬테크리스토	Edmond Dantes/The Count of Monte Cristo	Jeju Art Center	February 24 – 26	
2017	Monte Cristo	몬테크리스토	Edmond Dantes/The Count of Monte Cristo	Korea Sound Culture Hall, Chamber Hall	March 10 – 11	
2017	Monte Cristo	몬테크리스토	Edmond Dantes/The Count of Monte Cristo	Cheonan Arts Center, Main Theater	March 17 – 19	
2017	Monte Cristo	몬테크리스토	Edmond Dantes/The Count of Monte Cristo	Ulsan Culture and Arts Center, Main Theater	March 24–26	
2017	Monte Cristo	몬테크리스토	Edmond Dantes/The Count of Monte Cristo	Changwon Seongsan Art Hall, Main Theater	March 31 – April 2	
2017	Monte Cristo	몬테크리스토	Edmond Dantes/The Count of Monte Cristo	Gyeonggi Arts Center, Main Theater	April 14 – 16	
2017	Monte Cristo	몬테크리스토	Edmond Dantes/The Count of Monte Cristo	Gwangju Culture and Arts Center, Main Theater	April 21 – 23	
2017	Monte Cristo	몬테크리스토	Edmond Dantes/The Count of Monte Cristo	Icheon Art Hall, Main Theater	April 28 – 30	
2017	Monte Cristo	몬테크리스토	Edmond Dantes/The Count of Monte Cristo	Busan Citizen's Hall, Main Theater	May 12 – 14	
2017	Monte Cristo	몬테크리스토	Edmond Dantes/The Count of Monte Cristo	Incheon Culture & Arts Center Grand Theater	May 19 – 21	
2017	Monte Cristo	몬테크리스토	Edmond Dantes/The Count of Monte Cristo	Ansan Culture & Arts Center Sunrise Theater	May 26 – 28	
2017	Monte Cristo	몬테크리스토	Edmond Dantes/The Count of Monte Cristo	Daegu Keimyung Arts Center	June 2 – 4	
2017	Monte Cristo	몬테크리스토	Edmond Dantes/The Count of Monte Cristo	Daejeon Arts Center Art Hall	June 9 – 11	
2017	Mata Hari	마타하리	Armand	Sejong Center for the Performing Arts Grand Theater	June 16 – August 6	
2017	Rebecca	레베카	Maxim de Winter	Blue Square Shinhan Card Hall	August 10 – November 18	
2018	The Three Musketeers	삼총사	D'Artagnan	KEPCO Arts Center	March 16 – May 27	
2018	The Three Musketeers	삼총사	D'Artagnan	Daegu Keimyung Arts Center	June 1–3	
2018	The Three Musketeers	삼총사	D'Artagnan	Korea Traditional Music Center Moakdang	June 8–9	
2018	The Three Musketeers	삼총사	D'Artagnan	Busan Citizens' Hall Main Theater	June 16–17	
2018	The Three Musketeers	삼총사	D'Artagnan	Daejeon Arts Center Art Hall	June 22–24	
2018	The Three Musketeers	삼총사	D'Artagnan	Cheonan Arts Center Main Theater	July 6–8	
2018	The Three Musketeers	삼총사	D'Artagnan	Changwon Seongsan Art Hall Main Theater	July 20–21	
2018	The Three Musketeers	삼총사	D'Artagnan	Gwangju Arts Center Main Theater	July 27–29	
2018	The Days	그날들	Cha Jeong-hak	Centum City Sohyang Theater Shinhan Card Hall Busan	Dec 23–30	
2019	The Days	그날들	Cha Jeong-hak	Daejeon Arts Center Art Hall	Jan 5–6	
2019	The Days	그날들	Cha Jeong-hak	Iksan Arts Center Main Performance Hall	May 17–18	
2019	The Days	그날들	Cha Jeong-hak	Sohyang Theater Shinhan Card Hall, Busan	May 17–18	
2019	The Days	그날들	Cha Jeong-hak	Keimyung Art Center, Daegu	May 31 – June 2	
2019	The Days	그날들	Cha Jeong-hak	Gyeongsangnam-do Culture and Arts Center Grand Performance Hall, Jinju	June 7–8	
2019	Jack the Ripper	살인마 잭	Daniel	Seoul Olympic Park Woori Financial Art Hall	January 25 – March 31	
2019	Arthur's Excalibur	엑스칼리버	Lancelot	Sejong Centre for the Performing Arts Grand Theatre	June 15 – August 4	
2019	Dracula	드라큘라	Dracula	KEPCO Art Center	October 5 – December 1	
2019–2020	Rebecca	레베카	Maxim de Winter	Chungmu Art Center, Main Theater	November 16, 2019 – March 15, 2020	
2020	Rebecca	레베카	Maxim de Winter	Gimhae Cultural Center, Maru Hall	May 22 – 24, 2020	
2020	Rebecca	레베카	Maxim de Winter	Busan Dream Theater	May 29 – 31, 2020	
2020	Rebecca	레베카	Maxim de Winter	Gwangju Cultural Center (formerly Gwangju Cultural and Art Center)	June 5 – 7, 2020	
2020	20th Anniversary of Werther	베르테르	Werther	Gwanglim Art Center BBCH Hall	September 1 – November 1	
2020–2021	Monte Cristo	몬테크리스토	Edmond Dantes/Monte Cristo	LG Art Center	November 17, 2020 – March 28, 2021	
2021	Gwanghwamun Love Song	광화문 연가	Myung-woo	Seoul Arts Center Opera	July 16 – September 5	
2021	Gwanghwamun Love Song	광화문 연가	Myung-woo	Busan Citizen's Centre Grand Theatre	September 11–12, 2021	
2021	Gwanghwamun Love Song	광화문 연가	Myung-woo	Daegu Gyemyeong Art Centre	October 1–3, 2021	
2021	Gwanghwamun Love Song	광화문 연가	Myung-woo	Yongin Poeun Art Hall	October 9–10, 2021	
2021	Gwanghwamun Love Song	광화문 연가	Myung-woo	Seongnam Art Centre Opera House	November 5–7, 2021	
2021–2022	Jack the Ripper	잭 더 리퍼	Daniel	Korea Electric Power Corporation Art Center	December 3, 2021 – February 5, 2022	
2022	Jack the Ripper	잭 더 리퍼	Daniel	Keimyung Art Center, Daegu	February 18–20, 2022	
2022	Jack the Ripper	잭 더 리퍼	Daniel	Busan Dream Theatre	February 25–27, 2022	
2022	Jack the Ripper	잭 더 리퍼	Daniel	Goyang Oullim Nuri	April 8–10	
2023	The Days	그날들	Cha Jeong-hak	Seoul Arts Centre Opera Theatre	July 12–September 3	
2023	The Days	그날들	Cha Jeong-hak	Gangneung Art Center	October 27–29	
2023	The Days	그날들	Cha Jeong-hak	Daegu Keimyung Art Center	November 13–15	
2023	The Days	그날들	Cha Jeong-hak	Daejeon Arts Center Art Hall	November 17–19	
2023	The Days	그날들	Cha Jeong-hak	Gyeonggi Arts Center Main Theater, Suwon	November 25–26	
2024–2025	Gwanghwamun Love Song	광화문 연가	Myung-woo	D-Cube Link Art Centre	October 23, 2024 – January 5, 2025	
2024–2025	Gwanghwamun Love Song	광화문 연가	Myung-woo	Busan Dream Theatre	January 11–12, 2025	
2024–2025	Gwanghwamun Love Song	광화문 연가	Myung-woo	Yongin Poeun Art Hall	February 8–9, 2025	
2024–2025	Gwanghwamun Love Song	광화문 연가	Myung-woo	Goyang Aram Nuri Arts Center Aram Theater	February 15–16, 2025	
2024–2025	Gwanghwamun Love Song	광화문 연가	Myung-woo	Daejeon Arts Center Art Hall	March 1–2, 2025	
2024–2025	Gwanghwamun Love Song	광화문 연가	Myung-woo	Daegu Gyemyeong Art Centre	March 8–9, 2025	
2025	25th Anniversary of Werther	베르테르	Werther	D-Cube Link Art Centre	January 17 – March 16	
2025	25th Anniversary of Werther	베르테르	Werther	Busan Dream Theatre	March 29–30, 2025	
2025	25th Anniversary of Werther	베르테르	Werther	Daegu Gyemyeong Art Centre	April 5–6, 2025	

=== Theater ===
Theater play performances of Park
Year	Title		Role	Venue	Date	Ref.
Year	English	Korean	Role	Venue	Date	Ref.
1995	King Richard III	리챠드III	Archbishop of York; Sir Thomas Bowen; Earl of Sully	National Theatre Grand Theatre	November 10–17	
2000	Jang Bogo, the Sea God	해상왕 장보고	Moryeong-gun	Sejong Centre for the Performing Arts	March 3–11	
2000	Jang Bogo, the Sea God	해상왕 장보고	Moryeong-gun	Sejong Centre for the Performing Arts	March 11–12	
2004	Men's Impulses	연극열전 - 남자충동	Yoo-jung	Dongsung Art Centre Dongsung Hall	March 12 – April 18	
2007	Mad Kiss	미친키스	Jang Jung	Daehak-ro Installation Theatre Jeongmiso	September 5 – October 21	
2007–2008	Mad Kiss	미친키스	Jang Jung	Daehak-ro Installation Theatre Jeongmiso	December 8, 2007 – March 2, 2008	
2009	The Lower Depths	밑바닥에서	Satine	Seoul Arts Centre CJ Towol Theatre	February 14 – March 22	
2009	The Lower Depths	밑바닥에서	Satine	Cheongju Arts Centre Grand Performance Hall	March 28–29	
2009	If you cry and laugh	울다가 웃으면	Special appearance	Dongsung Art Center Small Theater	July 3 – August 30	
2010	Closer	클로저	Dan	Art One Theatre 1	August 6 to October 10	
2010	Closer	클로저	Dan	Gyeonggi Art Centre Grand Theatre	October 23 to 24	
2010	Closer	클로저	Dan	Daegu Student Culture Center Grand Hall	October 30 to 31	
2018	Art	아트	Marc	Uniplex 2	September 7 – November 4	
2020	Art	아트	Marc	Baekam Art Hall	March 7 – May 31, 2020	
2022	Art	아트	Marc	Yes 24 Stage 1	September 17 – December 11, 2022	
2024	Art	아트	Marc	Link Art Centre Bugs Hall	February 13 – May 12, 2024	

== Awards and nominations ==
Name of the award ceremony, year presented, category, nominee of the award, and the result of the nomination
Award ceremony	Year	Category	Nominee / Work	Result	Ref.
APAN Star Awards	2022	Top Excellence Award, Actor in a Serial Drama	The Penthouse: War in Life 2 and 3	Nominated	
Asia Model Awards	2021	Asia Star Award	The Penthouse: War in Life	Won	
Baeksang Arts Awards	2009	Best New Actor – Television	Worlds Within	Nominated	
Baeksang Arts Awards	2011	Best New Actor – Film	Man of Vendetta	Nominated	
Baeksang Arts Awards	2021	Best Actor – Television	The Penthouse: War in Life	Nominated	
Grand Bell Awards	2010	Best New Actor	Man of Vendetta	Nominated	
Grimae Awards	2021	Best Actor	The Penthouse: War in Life	Won	
KBS Drama Awards	2008	Best Supporting Actor	Worlds Within	Won	
Korea Drama Awards	2011	Best Supporting Actor	Dream High, Scent of a Woman	Nominated	
Korean Film Awards	2010	Best New Actor	Man of Vendetta	Nominated	
12nd Korea Musical Awards	2006	Best Actor	Finding Mister Destiny	Nominated	
Max Movie Awards	2011	Best New Actor	Man of Vendetta	Nominated	
MBC Drama Awards	2017	Top Excellence Award, Actor in a Miniseries	I'm Not a Robot	Nominated	
MBC Entertainment Awards	2007	Excellence Award, Actor in a Sitcom/Comedy	Kimchi Cheese Smile	Won	
MBC Entertainment Awards	2017	Male Rookie of the Year Award in Variety Category	Wizard of Nowhere	Nominated	
Puchon International Fantastic Film Festival	2011	It Star Award	Um Ki-joon	Won	
SBS Drama Awards	2011	Excellence Award, Actor in a Weekend Drama	Scent of a Woman	Won	
SBS Drama Awards	2012	Excellence Award, Actor in a Drama Special	Phantom	Nominated	
SBS Drama Awards	2017	Top Excellence Award, Actor in a Monday–Tuesday Drama	Innocent Defendant	Nominated	
SBS Drama Awards	2017	Character of the Year	Innocent Defendant	Won	
SBS Drama Awards	2018	Excellence Award, Actor in a Wednesday-Thursday Drama	Heart Surgeons	Nominated	
SBS Drama Awards	2018	Producer Award	Heart Surgeons	Won	
SBS Drama Awards	2020	Top Excellence Award, Actor in a Mid-Length Drama	The Penthouse: War in Life	Won	
SBS Drama Awards	2021	Top Excellence Award, Actor in a Miniseries Genre / Fantasy Drama	The Penthouse: War in Life 2 and 3	Nominated	
SBS Drama Awards	2021	Best Couple Award	Um Ki-joon (with Kim So-yeon); The Penthouse: War in Life 2 and 3	Nominated	
SBS Drama Awards	2023	Top Excellence Award, Actor in a Miniseries Genre/Action Drama	The Escape of the Seven	Nominated	
Seoul International Drama Awards	2021	Outstanding Korean Actor	The Penthouse: War in Life	Nominated	
