= Innocent Defendant =

2017 South Korean television series

- Promotional poster
- Hangul: 피고인
- Hanja: 被告人
- RR: Pigoin
- MR: P'igoin
- Genre: Legal drama; Thriller
- Developed by: Han Jung-hwan (planning)
- Written by: Choi Soo-jin; Choi Chang-hwan
- Directed by: Jo Young-kwang; Jung Dong-yoon
- Creative directors: Jo Young-min; Kim Jang-han
- Starring: Ji Sung; Um Ki-joon; Kwon Yu-ri; Oh Chang-seok; Uhm Hyun-kyung
- Music by: Park Se-joon (Music Director)
- Opening theme: Until The End (Inst.) by San E
- Country of origin: South Korea
- Original language: Korean
- No. of episodes: 18

Production
- Producers: Park Hyoung-gi; Min Hyun-il; Lee Sung-jin; Lee Sang-min
- Cinematography: Jung Min-gyun; Park Min-sung
- Editors: Jo In-hyung; Lim Ho-chul
- Running time: 60 minutes
- Production companies: Signal Entertainment Group; The Story Works (SBS)

Original release
- Network: SBS TV
- Release: January 23 – March 21, 2017

Innocent Defendant (Korean: 피고인; RR: pigoin; lit. 'Defendant') is a South Korean television series starring Ji Sung, Um Ki-joon, Kwon Yu-ri, Oh Chang-seok, and Uhm Hyun-kyung. It aired on SBS from January 23 to March 21, 2017 on Mondays and Tuesdays at 22:00 (KST) for 18 episodes.

== Synopsis ==
Park Jung-woo is a prosecutor at Seoul Central District Prosecutors' Office. One day, he wakes up and finds himself a convict on death row. Suffering from temporary amnesia, Jung-woo has no idea what landed him in prison. He struggles to recover his memory and clear his name.

== Cast ==
=== Main ===
- Ji Sung as Park Jung-woo

A Prosecutor of the Seoul Central District Prosecutor's Office. The head of the violent crimes investigative division who never loses a case.

- Um Ki-joon as Cha Sun-ho / Cha Min-ho
  - Han Ki-won as young Cha Sun-ho
  - Han Ki-woong as young Cha Min-ho

Cha Sun-ho is the President of Chamyung Group and Cha Min-ho's older brother.
Cha Min-ho is the Vice President of Chamyung Group and the younger brother of Cha Sun-ho. He is neglected and abused by his father.

- Kwon Yu-ri as Seo Eun-hye

A defense lawyer who strives to be eloquent and rational, but loses in court every single time. She takes up Jung-woo's case.

- Oh Chang-seok as Kang Jun-hyuk

Jung-woo's best friend and fellow Prosecutor at the Seoul Central District Prosecutor's Office.

- Uhm Hyun-kyung as Na Yeon-hee

Sun-ho's wife and daughter of a bankrupt chaebol, who has a fiery ambition to succeed.

=== Supporting ===
==== People around Jung-woo ====
- Son Yeo-eun as Yoon Ji-soo, Jung-woo's wife.
- Shin Rin-ah as Park Ha-yeon, Jung-woo's daughter.
- Kang Sung-min as Yoon Tae-soo, Jung-woo's brother-in-law. A prison officer.
- Sung Byung-suk as Oh Jung-hee, Jung-woo's mother-in-law.

==== Prosecutors ====
- Park Ho-san as Choi Dae-hong
- Lee Shin-sung as Ko Dong-yoon
- Han Ji-woo as Yeo Min-kyung
- Jung Dong-gyu as Deputy Prosecutor General

==== Wol-jeong Prison ====
- Kim Min-seok as Lee Sung-gyu

Born on 16 December 1990, Lee Sung-gyu is a convict charged with assault. The prison's quick-witted mood maker, who helps take care of Jung-woo.

- Jo Jae-yoon as Shin Cheol-sik

Jung-woo's jail-mate who was serving life imprisonment for murder. He was jailed by Jung-woo for killing his boss, later to be revealed that he was falsely accused of the crime.

- Yoon Yong-hyun as Chief Priest
- Woo Hyun as Han Sang-wook aka Milyang

A former doctor, he had been imprisoned for 20 years by the time he became Jung-woo's cell-mate.

- Oh Dae-hwan as Cheon Pil-jae / Moong Chi aka Bundle

Jung-woo's helper.

- Jo Jae-ryong as Oh Hyuk-joo aka Rockfish

Jung-woo's jail-mate.

==== Chamyung Group ====
- Jang Gwang as Cha Young-woon
- Ye Soo-jung as Myung Geum-ja
- Kim Kyung-nam as Executive Secretary

=== Extended ===
- Kim Seung-hoon as Prison Security Chief
- Baek Ji-won as Eun-hye's aunt
- Seo In-sung as Cha Eun-soo, Yeon-hee's son.
- Lee Jung-hun as Yeo Sung-soo
- Oh Seung-hoon as Kim Seok, Cha Min-ho's henchman.
- Seo Jeong-yeon as Kim Sun-hwa, a psychiatrist.
- Hwang Young-hee as Cheon Pil-jae's older sister

=== Special appearances ===
- Kim Hwan as News Anchor (ep. 1)
- Seo Dong-won as Detective Oh Jong-min (ep. 3, 7-8)
- Han Kyu-won as Lee Chan-young (ep. 6)
- Oh Yeon-ah as Jennifer Lee (ep. 7 & 8)
- Lee Deok-hwa as Prisoner #2460 (ep. 8)
- Lee Si-eon (ep. 18)

== Production ==
Innocent Defendant is directed by Jo Young-kwang of 49 Days, and written by Choi Su-jin of City Hunter. Its first script reading took place on November 18, 2016 at the SBS Studio in Ilsan, South Korea.

== Original soundtrack ==
Defendant: The OST Album

Soundtrack album by Various Artists
- Genre: Soundtrack
- Languages: Korean, English
- Labels: Signal Entertainment Group; The Story Works; KT Music

In December 2016, co-producer Signal Entertainment Group signed a deal with KT Music for the soundtrack of Innocent Defendant.

=== Part 1 ===
No.	Title	Lyrics	Music	Artist	Length
1.	"Dreaming Now"	Dona; Yuyu	17HOLIC; Edison; Lee Jung-won	Son Dong-woon (Highlight)	3:37
2.	"Dreaming Now" (Inst.)		17HOLIC; Edison; Lee Jung-won		3:37
Total length:					7:14

=== Part 2 ===
No.	Title	Lyrics	Music	Artist	Length
1.	"Until the End" (끝까지)	Jung San; Park Se-joon; Han Joon	Park Se-joon; Song Jin-suk	San E	3:24
2.	"Until the End" (끝까지) (Inst.)		Park Se-joon; Song Jin-suk		3:24
Total length:					6:48

=== Part 3 ===
No.	Title	Lyrics	Music	Artist	Length
1.	"Winter Tree" (바람이 차갑네요)	CuzD; Ricky; Dona	CuzD; Ricky; Dona	Suran	4:15
2.	"Winter Tree" (바람이 차갑네요) (Inst.)		CuzD; Ricky; Dona		4:13
Total length:					8:28

=== Part 4 ===
No.	Title	Lyrics	Music	Artist	Length
1.	"Trauma" (아픈 그림자)	Lee Seung-hyun; Eun Jong-tae	Choi Cheon-gon; Eun Jong-tae	Raun	3:43
Total length:					3:43

== Reception ==
The series was a commercial success with over 25% ratings and topped popularity charts. It received praise for its plot-focused narrative, impressive acting performance of lead actors Ji Sung and Um Ki-joon and its ability to resonate with the public. The Korea Times said the drama is like a "warning sign to the evil and powerful figures of the real world"; and Yonhap News Agency praise Ji's character as "putting a relatable human face on a tale that is often disturbingly grim and somber". However, it also had criticisms about its unrealistic plot and its tendency to repeat the same pattern of twists and turns to keep viewers hooked.

== Ratings ==
In the table below, the blue numbers represent the lowest ratings and the red numbers represent the highest ratings.

Ep.	Original broadcast date	Average audience share			
Ep.	Original broadcast date	TNmS		AGB Nielsen	
Ep.	Original broadcast date	Nationwide	Seoul	Nationwide	Seoul
1	January 23, 2017	11.9% (5th)	13.9% (4th)	14.5% (4th)	16.3% (4th)
2	January 24, 2017	12.9% (4th)	15.1% (4th)	14.9% (4th)	16.1% (3rd)
3	January 30, 2017	12.8% (4th)	15.1% (3rd)	17.3% (3rd)	18.2% (2nd)
4	January 31, 2017	14.8% (4th)	17.8% (3rd)	18.7% (3rd)	20.8% (2nd)
5	February 6, 2017	14.2% (4th)	16.3% (3rd)	18.6% (3rd)	19.6% (2nd)
6	February 7, 2017	15.3% (4th)	18.5% (2nd)	18.6% (3rd)	19.6% (2nd)
7	February 13, 2017	15.8% (4th)	18.9% (3rd)	20.9% (3rd)	22.4% (1st)
8	February 14, 2017	16.6% (4th)	20.2% (2nd)	22.2% (2nd)	23.8% (2nd)
9	February 20, 2017	15.9% (4th)	20.0% (2nd)	21.4% (3rd)	23.1% (2nd)
10	February 21, 2017	16.8% (4th)	20.4% (2nd)	22.2% (2nd)	23.4% (2nd)
11	February 27, 2017	19.8% (3rd)	22.7% (2nd)	23.3% (2nd)	24.6% (1st)
12	February 28, 2017	19.0% (3rd)	22.1% (1st)	22.9% (2nd)	23.9% (2nd)
13	March 6, 2017	18.8% (3rd)	22.2% (2nd)	23.7% (2nd)	25.4% (1st)
14	March 7, 2017	20.1% (3rd)	24.3% (1st)	24.9% (2nd)	26.1% (1st)
15	March 13, 2017	20.3% (3rd)	23.5% (2nd)	25.6% (2nd)	27.1% (1st)
16	March 14, 2017	21.3% (3rd)	24.6% (1st)	25.4% (2nd)	27.1% (1st)
17	March 20, 2017	24.8% (2nd)	29.0% (1st)	27.0% (2nd)	28.8% (1st)
18	March 21, 2017	26.6% (2nd)	30.3% (1st)	28.3% (1st)	29.7% (1st)
Average		17.65%	20.83%	21.69%	23.11%

== Awards and nominations ==
Year	Award	Category	Recipient	Result	Ref.
2017	10th Korea Drama Awards	Best Original Soundtrack	Son Dong-woon (Dreaming Now)	Nominated	
2017	1st The Seoul Awards	Best Drama	Innocent Defendant	Nominated	
2017	1st The Seoul Awards	Best Actor	Ji Sung	Won	
2017	1st The Seoul Awards	Best Supporting Actress	Seo Jeong-yeon	Nominated	
2017	1st The Seoul Awards	Best New Actor	Kim Min-seok	Won	
2017	SBS Drama Awards	Grand Prize (Daesang)	Ji Sung	Won	
2017	SBS Drama Awards	Drama of the Year	Innocent Defendant	Won	
2017	SBS Drama Awards	Character of the Year	Um Ki-joon	Won	
2017	SBS Drama Awards	Top Excellence Award, Actor in a Monday–Tuesday Drama	Ji Sung	Nominated	
2017	SBS Drama Awards	Top Excellence Award, Actor in a Monday–Tuesday Drama	Um Ki-joon	Nominated	
2017	SBS Drama Awards	Excellence Award, Actor in a Monday–Tuesday Drama	Kim Min-seok	Nominated	
2017	SBS Drama Awards	Excellence Award, Actress in a Monday–Tuesday Drama	Kwon Yu-ri	Nominated	
2017	SBS Drama Awards	Best Supporting Actor	Jo Jae-yoon	Nominated	
2017	SBS Drama Awards	Best Supporting Actor	Oh Dae-hwan	Nominated	
2017	SBS Drama Awards	Youth Acting Award	Shin Rin-ah	Nominated	
2017	30th Grimae Awards	Best Actor	Ji Sung	Won	
2017	30th Grimae Awards	Best Drama	Jung Min-gyun, Song Yo-hoon	Won	

== Adaptations ==
- The series was adapted in Turkey as "Mahkum - Şehrin Kralları" and it has been broadcast on Fox TV.
- The series was adapted in Russia as "Подсудимый" and it has been broadcast on NTV.
