= My Strange Hero =

2018 South Korean television series

- Promotional poster
- Also known as: Revenge Is Back
- Hangul: 복수가 돌아왔다
- Lit.: Bok-soo's Back
- RR: Boksuga dorawatda
- MR: Poksuga torawatta
- Genre: Romantic comedy Youth; Revenge
- Created by: Han Jung-hwan
- Written by: Ham Joon-ho
- Directed by: Kim Yoon-young
- Starring: Yoo Seung-ho; Jo Bo-ah; Kwak Dong-yeon
- Music by: Park Se-joon
- Country of origin: South Korea
- Original language: Korean
- No. of episodes: 32 (Note: In order to circumvent Korean laws that prevent commercial breaks in the middle of an episode, what would previously have been aired as single 70 minute episodes are now being repackaged as two 35 minute episodes, with two episodes being shown each night with a commercial break between the two.)

Production
- Executive producers: Jeon Sung-taek; Shin In-soo; Yoo Hong-gu
- Camera setup: Single-camera
- Running time: 35 minutes
- Production companies: Super Moon Pictures; Aniplus

Original release
- Network: SBS TV
- Release: December 10, 2018 – February 4, 2019

My Strange Hero (Korean: 복수가 돌아왔다) is a South Korean television series starring Yoo Seung-ho, Jo Bo-ah, and Kwak Dong-yeon. It aired on SBS TV from December 10, 2018, to February 4, 2019, every Monday and Tuesday at 22:00 (KST) for 32 episodes.

== Synopsis ==
In 2009, Kang Bok-soo is enrolled as a junior at Seolsong High, a prestigious private high school known for its discriminatory practice of segregating students based on their grades and social status. Bok-soo is a routine troublemaker who scores poorly in tests, but he is also popular for being a bully hunter. He dates the school's smartest student, Son Soo-jung, who doesn't reciprocate entirely, and is also best friends with Oh Se-ho, the awkward son of the school's abusive board chairwoman, Lim Se-gyeong. Soo-jung has long been hiding the fact that she is poor, but her background is suddenly outed to the school a day after she discloses it to Bok-soo, causing her to believe that he cares for her out of simple pity. When she heads to the roof to mourn, she hears Bok-soo and Se-ho having an argument, ending with the latter falling. Se-ho survives the incident and testifies that Bok-soo pushed him. Soo-jung, still heartbroken by Bok-soo's apparent betrayal, testifies against him as well as revenge, leading to his expulsion from Seolsong.

Nine years later, Bok-soo is working at Your Request, a general service company. Soo-jung is struggling to receive a promotion as a permanent teacher at Seolsong and was unwittingly scammed to pay a hefty sum of money to become one. She is currently counseling Oh Young-min, a troubled student of Ivy, the school's highest-ranked class. She talks down Young-min when he attempts to commit suicide by jumping into the Han River, only to end up falling down with him. Bok-soo, who happens to be standing nearby, saves her. His heroic action forces Se-ho, recently promoted to become Seolsong's board chairman, to re-admit Bok-soo into the school and appease public opinion. Bok-soo enters Wildflower, the school's lowest-ranked class. Se-ho pulls some strings to promote Soo-jung as permanent teacher and gives her the job to mentor Wildflower.

Bok-soo devises a plan to take revenge against Seolsong, and Se-ho in particular, for the lies that caused his expulsion. Though initially chilly, Bok-soo rekindles his relationship with Soo-jung when they learn that their grudge was driven by a series of misunderstandings and her hate: Se-ho was the one who gossiped Soo-jung's background and framed Bok-soo into playing the part of his rooftop fall, which was actually a suicide attempt. Se-ho has long been in love with Soo-jung and framed Bok-soo precisely so they would split. When Soo-jung confronts him about this, he openly admits his actions and warns her that, for rejecting him, he would make her and Bok-soo's lives miserable. Aided by his friends, Bok-soo slowly dismantles the corrupt atmosphere of Seolsong. In the process, they have to face the school's entire upper management, all of whom want to preserve the status quo. Upon collecting enough evidences, Bok-soo uploads a video containing documents that implicate Seolsong's corruption.

The ensuing scrutiny convinces Se-gyeong to depose her son and engineer a scapegoat so the school's reputation could be protected. Se-ho, having had a change of heart and sick of being mistreated by his mother, forms an alliance with Bok-soo to further scrutinize Seolsong and bring them to court. Bok-soo publicizes Se-gyeong's plan to turn Seolsong into a corporation, and Soo-jung further testifies against her at the cost of her job. Se-ho, meanwhile, admits the truth about his suicide attempt. Not willing to surrender, Se-gyeong blackmails Se-ho into becoming a scapegoat and plans to close Seolsong. Bok-soo, Soo-jung, their friends, and the teachers band together to prevent her from entering the school long enough until the police arrive to arrest her, having been tipped by Se-ho regarding his mother's crimes.

In the aftermath of Se-gyeong's arrest, Seolsong becomes a public school. Se-ho moves to the United States to recover, while Bok-soo receives his high school diploma a year later. Four years later, Bok-soo is teaching at Seolsong, while Soo-jung finally becomes a teacher through legitimate means.

== Cast ==
=== Main ===
- Yoo Seung-ho as Kang Bok-soo

A rowdy and selfless young man who got expelled from Seolsong High for a crime he was falsely accused of. Nine years later, he is invited to attend the school again, despite being 25 years old, and plans to take revenge by reforming the school establishment. His lack of a high school diploma closes the door to many job opportunities for him, making him rather bitter, but Bok-soo possesses a strong sense of justice and is eager to fix other people's problems. Bok-Soo hates Soo-jung and Se-ho but never acts on it fully.

- Jo Bo-ah as Son Soo-jung

Nine years ago, Soo-jung was Seolsong's smartest student and Bok-soo's girlfriend. However, their relationship fell apart when she thought he betrayed her by exposing her biggest secret: poverty. Soo-jung responded in kind and told the investigators of Se-ho's accident what she heard, in hate towards Bok-Soo, sealing the decision to expel Bok-soo from Seolsong. Since then, Soo-jung has been living in regret, but the memory of the betrayal prevents her from reconciling with Bok-soo until years later. Though she appears wholesome, Soo-jung is headstrong and uses crude language, which Bok-soo brands "two-faced". Soo-jung's dream is to become a teacher, something that keeps her motivated throughout her rough life.

- Kwak Dong-yeon as Oh Se-ho

When he first enrolled, Se-ho was the awkward son of Seolsong's ruthless chairwoman and led an unhappy life. His mother is shamelessly abusive and deadbeat, something that traumatized him for life. He is jealous of Bok-soo for having a loving family and dating the girl Se-ho has a crush on. He eventually attempted suicide, but survived and framed Bok-soo at his mother's urging. Nine years later, Se-ho takes over as Seolsong's chairman.

=== Supporting ===
==== Your Request staff ====
- Kim Dong-young as Lee Kyung-hyun

Bok-soo's childhood friend who graduated from Seolsong and the CEO of Your Request. He is fiercely loyal to Bok-soo and helps him in his revenge plan against Seolsong. Kyung-hyun eventually develops a relationship with Min-ji, though his thick attitude exasperates her.

- Park Ah-in as Yang Min-ji

Min-ji was initially one of Bok-soo's many admirers back at Seolsong, but she showed her depth when she became one of the only three people from school who defended him when he was accused of harming Se-ho. Min-ji's crush on Bok-soo persists nine years later, even after Bok-soo repeatedly told her that he only sees her as a friend. Min-ji is initially hostile at Soo-jung for betraying Bok-soo when he needed her most, but grows to accept her as his girlfriend. She slowly moves on from her crush and falls in love with Kyung-hyun.

==== People around Bok-soo ====
- Kim Mi-kyung as Lee Jung-sun

Bok-soo's mother who runs a restaurant called Sojeonggak. She is unfailingly kind and always sees the best of everyone.

- Kim Jae-hwa as Kang So-jung

Bok-soo's much older sister who won the gold medal in sepak takraw during the 2002 Asian Games. She spoils In-ho very much and is fooled into thinking that he is a bright student, when his scores are rather poor. She is furious upon learning the truth, but is convinced by Soo-jung to forgive him.

- Choi Won-hong as Kang In-ho

So-jung's son and Bok-soo's nephew. He is a shy nerd who lies about his poor grades to his mother ever since he entered Seolsong. Until Bok-soo enters his class, In-ho's attitude makes him a frequent target of bullying. He supports Bok-soo's and Soo-jung's relationship and calls the latter "aunt", much to her embarrassment.

==== People around Soo-jung ====
- Kim Young-ok as Lee Sun-hye

Soo-jung's sickly paternal grandmother and the only family she has left, after her mother died and her father left. The cost for her treatment is one of Soo-jung's motivations to apply as a teacher.

- Joel Roberts as Shim-lan

An African American expatriate who works in a convenience store Soo-jung frequents.

==== People around Se-ho ====
- Kim Yeo-jin as Lim Se-gyeong

Se-ho's abusive mother. She inherited the position as board chairwoman of Seolsong after her husband left her. Se-ho's issue with his mother is the catalyst that makes him a ruthless person as an adult. She was the one who persuaded Se-ho to frame Bok-soo for his suicide attempt. Later in the series, she becomes the primary antagonist to Bok-soo's and Soo-jung's attempt to reform the school. In the penultimate episode, she gets arrested for violating the Additional Law of Specific Crimes by committing embezzlement and bribery. Then, in the finale, she gets sentenced to life imprisonment.

- Lee Seung-hyung as Mr. Yoo

Se-ho's secretary. While investigating Se-ho, Bok-soo finds out that he is gay.

==== Seolsong School students ====
- Yeon Joon-seok as Oh Young-min

A student from Ivy class whose suicide attempt, caused by the pressure of having the lowest score in class, begins a chain of events leading to Bok-soo entering Seolsong. He eventually transfers to Wildflower class and has a much happier time there.

- Lee Kang-min as Yoon Seung-woo

A brooding student from Wildflower class who works as a night club bartender. He bullies In-ho until Bok-soo comes, after which his attitude changes. He falls in love with Soo-jung and warns Bok-soo that if he is not careful, he will steal her from him.

- Yoo Seon-ho as Yoo Shi-on

Seung-woo's friend and one of the students who bully In-ho until Bok-soo is invited to the class.

- Oh Hee-joon as Kim Jae-yoon
- Jang Dong-joo as Lee Chae-min

A student from Ivy class who frequently bullies the Wildflower class. Though he is nominally Seolsong's smartest student, he cheats his way out of tests, as his mother is dealing with the principal to get the answer sheets.

- Kim Da-ye as Gye So-ra
- Hong Seung-beom as Choi Do-hyun

==== Seolsong School staff ====
- Chun Ho-jin as Teacher Park Dong-joon

The head of the school staff who teaches mathematics. He believes Bok-soo's innocence regarding Se-ho's incident. He is close to Bok-soo and views him as a surrogate son.

- Jo Hyun-sik as Ma Young-joon

An English teacher. Nine years ago, Bok-soo saved him from bullies, making him revere Bok-soo.

- Um Hyo-sup as Kim Kwi-chang

Seolsong's principal. Like most of the upper management, he is corrupt and is bribed by the wealthier students' parents to leak test answer sheets.

- Kim Kwang-kyu as Song Yoo-taek

The grumpy vice principal responsible for overseeing the teachers' conduct.

- Kim Do-yeon as Hong Jung-hye

A Korean teacher.

- Park Kyung-hye as Jang Ji-hyun

An ethics teacher.

- Jang Won-young as Kim Guk-hyun

A student manager.

- Jung Hee as Dong Hee

A physical education teacher.

- Shin Dam-soo as Kim Myung-ho

An administrative manager. He resigns at the start of the series after scamming many people, including Soo-jung, who want to buy their way into the permanent teacher position.

- Chae Song-ah as Park Min-hee

A physics teacher.

- Kwon Hyuk as A sports Teacher

==== Parents of Seolsong School's students ====
- Jeon Soo-kyeong as Chae-min's mother
- Kim Young-sun as Young-min's mother

==== Others ====
- Seo Hye-won as Kim Bo-kyung

=== Special appearances ===
- Kim Jin-woo as groom (Ep. 1)
- Lee Chae-young as bride (Ep. 1)
- Hwang Bo-ra as woman dumped via Bok-soo (Ep. 2, 3)
- Kim Ji-min as a rich lady and a Your Request client (Ep. 4)
- Lee Jung-eun as the mother of a Your Request client (Ep. 4)

== Production ==
The first script reading took place on October 8, 2018 at SBS Ilsan Production Studios in Goyang, Gyeonggi Province, South Korea. The drama serves as a reunion project for Jo Bo-ah and Joel Roberts who both starred in the 2018 drama Goodbye to Goodbye.

== Original soundtrack ==
My Strange Hero OST

Soundtrack album by Various artists
- Recorded: 2018
- Genre: Soundtrack
- Languages: Korean; English
- Labels: Blending Co., Ltd

=== Part 1 ===
Released on December 10, 2018
| No. | Title | Lyrics | Music | Artist | Length |
|---|---|---|---|---|---|
| 1. | "I'll Meet You" (나랑 만나볼래요) | Lee Yong-min; TLL | Lee Yong-min; TLL | Ken (VIXX) | 3:13 |
| 2. | "I'll Meet You" (Inst.) | | Lee Yong-min; TLL | | 3:13 |
| Total length: | | | | | 6:26 |

=== Part 2 ===
Released on December 13, 2018
| No. | Title | Lyrics | Music | Artist | Length |
|---|---|---|---|---|---|
| 1. | "Blue Sky" | The Night of Seokyo (A); The Night of Seokyo (D); Dawon | The Night of Seokyo (A) | The Night of Seokyo | 3:48 |
| 2. | "Blue Sky" (Inst.) | | The Night of Seokyo (A) | | 3:48 |
| Total length: | | | | | 7:36 |

=== Part 3 ===
Released on December 17, 2018
| No. | Title | Lyrics | Music | Artist | Length |
|---|---|---|---|---|---|
| 1. | "Are You Listening" (듣고 있니) | Han Joon; Park Se-joon | Han Gil; Park Se-joon | Hwang Chi-yeul | 3:51 |
| 2. | "Are You Listening" (Inst.) | | Han Gil; Park Se-joon | | 3:51 |
| Total length: | | | | | 7:42 |

=== Part 4 ===
Released on December 20, 2018
| No. | Title | Lyrics | Music | Artist | Length |
|---|---|---|---|---|---|
| 1. | "Love Story" | Han Joon; Park Se-joon | TAIBIAN; Park Tae-jin | Stella Jang | 3:21 |
| 2. | "Love Story" (Inst.) | | TAIBIAN; Park Tae-jin | | 3:21 |
| Total length: | | | | | 6:42 |

=== Part 5 ===
Released on December 24, 2018
| No. | Title | Lyrics | Music | Artist | Length |
|---|---|---|---|---|---|
| 1. | "Snowflake Love" (눈꽃사랑) | Han Joon; Park Se-joon | Lee Yoo-jin; Park Se-joon | Yuju (GFriend) | 3:36 |
| 2. | "Snowflake Love" (Inst.) | | Lee Yoo-jin; Park Se-joon | | 3:36 |
| Total length: | | | | | 7:12 |

=== Part 6 ===
Released on January 1, 2019
| No. | Title | Lyrics | Music | Artist | Length |
|---|---|---|---|---|---|
| 1. | "Is It Love" (사랑일까) | DinDin; Han Joon; Park Se-joon | Lee Yoo-jin; Park Se-joon | DinDin, Soyeon (Laboum) | 3:35 |
| 2. | "Is It Love" (Inst.) | | Lee Yoo-jin; Park Se-joon | | 3:35 |
| Total length: | | | | | 7:10 |

=== Part 7 ===
Released on January 7, 2019
| No. | Title | Lyrics | Music | Artist | Length |
|---|---|---|---|---|---|
| 1. | "Send-off" (배웅) | Motte | Motte | Motte | 3:25 |
| 2. | "Send-off" (Inst.) | | Motte | | 3:25 |
| Total length: | | | | | 6:50 |

=== Part 8 ===
Released on January 8, 2019
| No. | Title | Lyrics | Music | Artist | Length |
|---|---|---|---|---|---|
| 1. | "When You Walk" (걷다보면) | Choi Sang-yeop; Park Se-joon | Choi Sang-yeop; Park Se-joon | Choi Sang-yeop | 3:40 |
| 2. | "When You Walk" (Inst.) | | Choi Sang-yeop; Park Se-joon | | 3:40 |
| Total length: | | | | | 7:20 |

=== Part 9 ===
Released on January 15, 2019
| No. | Title | Lyrics | Music | Artist | Length |
|---|---|---|---|---|---|
| 1. | "Magic Dream" | Han Joon; Park Se-joon | TAIBIAN; CHKmate | April | 3:22 |
| 2. | "Magic Dream" (Inst.) | | TAIBIAN; CHKmate | | 3:22 |
| Total length: | | | | | 6:44 |

Disc 2:
| No. | Title | Artist | Length |
|---|---|---|---|
| 1. | "Afternoon Date" | Various Artists | 3:02 |
| 2. | "A Gloomy Desk" | Various Artists | 1:49 |
| 3. | "Are We Really Parted?" | Various Artists | 3:13 |
| 4. | "Day of the revenge" | Various Artists | 1:56 |
| 5. | "False Charge" | Various Artists | 2:18 |
| 6. | "Formidable Music" | Various Artists | 1:46 |
| 7. | "Fuzz Cruising" | Various Artists | 1:11 |
| 8. | "Knife Wind" | Various Artists | 2:14 |
| 9. | "Kiss on the Roof" | Various Artists | 1:42 |
| 10. | "Lunchtime" | Various Artists | 1:46 |
| 11. | "Looking for Love" | Various Artists | 2:02 |
| 12. | "More and More" | Various Artists | 2:48 |
| 13. | "Night Letter" | Various Artists | 2:51 |
| 14. | "Jjang Jjang Man" | Various Artists | 1:31 |
| 15. | "Toys Park" | Various Artists | 1:15 |
| 16. | "The Way to School" | Various Artists | 2:14 |
| 17. | "The Abandoned Children" | Various Artists | 3:09 |
| 18. | "The Moment of Fate" | Various Artists | 2:55 |
| 19. | "See You" | Various Artists | 1:56 |
| 20. | "Snowflake Love (Guitar ver.)" | Various Artists | 3:35 |
| 21. | "With" | Various Artists | 2:03 |
| 22. | "Wild Flower" | Various Artists | 2:04 |

== Ratings ==
- In this table, the blue numbers represent the lowest ratings and the red numbers represent the highest ratings.
- NR denotes that the drama did not rank in the top 20 daily programs on that date.
- N/A denotes that the rating is not known.

| Ep. | Original broadcast date | Average audience share | | |
| Ep. | Original broadcast date | TNmS | AGB Nielsen | |
| Ep. | Original broadcast date | Nationwide | Nationwide | Seoul |
|---|---|---|---|---|
| 1 | December 10, 2018 | 5.5% | 4.3% (NR) | 4.9% (NR) |
| 2 | December 10, 2018 | 6.1% | 5.4% (NR) | 6.0% (18th) |
| 3 | December 11, 2018 | 4.7% | 4.6% (NR) | 5.2% (NR) |
| 4 | December 11, 2018 | 5.2% | 6.1% (16th) | 7.1% (16th) |
| 5 | December 17, 2018 | 5.8% | 4.5% (NR) | 5.2% (NR) |
| 6 | December 17, 2018 | 6.8% | 5.9% (19th) | 6.5% (16th) |
| 7 | December 18, 2018 | 5.0% | 4.8% (NR) | 5.6% (19th) |
| 8 | December 18, 2018 | 6.3% | 6.3% (15th) | 7.3% (12th) |
| 9 | December 24, 2018 | —N/a | 4.7% (NR) | 5.3% (NR) |
| 10 | December 24, 2018 | 6.6% | 6.0% (20th) | 6.7% (17th) |
| 11 | December 25, 2018 | —N/a | 6.2% (NR) | 7.1% (18th) |
| 12 | December 25, 2018 | 6.6% | 7.4% (13th) | 8.2% (10th) |
| 13 | January 1, 2019 | 5.8% | 7.1% (16th) | 8.0% (14th) |
| 14 | January 1, 2019 | 7.2% | 8.1% (12th) | 9.1% (9th) |
| 15 | January 7, 2019 | 5.4% | 4.3% (NR) | 4.5% (NR) |
| 16 | January 7, 2019 | 5.1% | 4.8% (NR) | 5.2% (NR) |
| 17 | January 8, 2019 | 4.3% | 4.9% (NR) | 5.7% (NR) |
| 18 | January 8, 2019 | 4.6% | 5.4% (NR) | 6.2% (NR) |
| 19 | January 14, 2019 | 5.0% | 4.3% (NR) | —N/a |
| 20 | January 14, 2019 | 5.5% | 5.4% (NR) | 6.2% (19th) |
| 21 | January 15, 2019 | —N/a | 4.9% (NR) | —N/a |
| 22 | January 15, 2019 | —N/a | 5.9% (NR) | 6.8% (16th) |
| 23 | January 21, 2019 | 4.6% | 4.6% (NR) | —N/a |
| 24 | January 21, 2019 | 5.2% | 5.1% (NR) | 5.4% (NR) |
| 25 | January 22, 2019 | 3.5% | 3.2% (NR) | —N/a |
| 26 | January 22, 2019 | 4.7% | 4.7% (NR) | 5.2% (20th) |
| 27 | January 28, 2019 | —N/a | 4.8% (NR) | —N/a |
| 28 | January 28, 2019 | —N/a | 6.4% (16th) | 6.8% (15th) |
| 29 | January 29, 2019 | —N/a | 4.8% (NR) | —N/a |
| 30 | January 29, 2019 | —N/a | 5.7% (19th) | 5.9% (16th) |
| 31 | February 4, 2019 | —N/a | 4.4% (NR) | —N/a |
| 32 | February 4, 2019 | —N/a | 5.1% (NR) | —N/a |
| Average | | — (Note: Due to some ratings not recorded, the exact average rating is unknown.) | 5.3% | — |

- Episodes 13-14 did not air on December 31, 2018 due to the broadcast of the 2018 SBS Drama Awards.
