= 2018 MBC Drama Awards =

37th edition of award ceremony

- Date: December 30, 2018
- Site: MBC Media Center Public Hall, Sangam-dong, Mapo District, Seoul
- Hosted by: Main: Kim Yong-man; Seohyun; Special MC: Kim Tae-jin

Highlights
- Best Drama Serial: My Secret Terrius
- Grand Prize (Daesang): So Ji-sub

Television coverage
- Network: MBC
- Duration: 230 minutes

The 2018 MBC Drama Awards, presented by Munhwa Broadcasting Corporation(MBC) took place on December 30, 2018. It was hosted by Kim Yong-man and Seohyun.

== Winners and nominees ==
- This year, the Grand Prize (Daesang) has been determined by judges including PDs from MBC. The "Drama of the Year" award was chosen by viewers.
- Winners denoted in **bold**.

Grand Prize (Daesang)	Drama of the Year
**So Ji-sub** – **My Secret Terrius**; Chae Shi-ra – Goodbye to Goodbye; Jung Jae-young – Partners for Justice; Kim Sun-ah – Children of Nobody; Lee Yoo-ri – Hide and Seek; Shin Ha-kyun – Less Than Evil	**My Secret Terrius**; Come and Hug Me; Children of Nobody; Hide and Seek; Less Than Evil; My Contracted Husband, Mr. Oh; Partners for Justice
Top Excellence Award, Actor in a Monday-Tuesday Miniseries	Top Excellence Award, Actress in a Monday-Tuesday Miniseries
**Jung Jae-young** – **Partners for Justice**; **Shin Ha-kyun** – **Less Than Evil**; Jang Hyuk – Bad Papa; Ji Hyun-woo – Risky Romance	**Jeong Yu-mi** – **Partners for Justice**; Lee Si-young – Risky Romance; Son Yeo-eun – Bad Papa
Top Excellence Award, Actor in a Wednesday-Thursday Miniseries	Top Excellence Award, Actress in a Wednesday-Thursday Miniseries
**So Ji-sub** – **My Secret Terrius**; Huh Joon-ho – Come and Hug Me; Kim Tae-hoon – Hold Me Tight; Yoon Sang-hyun – Hold Me Tight	**Kim Sun-ah** – **Children of Nobody**; Han Hye-jin – Hold Me Tight; Seohyun – Time
Top Excellence Award, Actor in a Weekend Special Project	Top Excellence Award, Actress in a Weekend Special Project
**Kim Kang-woo** – **My Contracted Husband, Mr. Oh**; Bae Soo-bin – A Pledge to God; Lee Sung-jae – Goodbye to Goodbye; Song Chang-eui – Hide and Seek	**Chae Shi-ra** – **Goodbye to Goodbye**; **Lee Yoo-ri** – **Hide and Seek**; Han Chae-young – A Pledge to God; Uee – My Contracted Husband, Mr. Oh
Top Excellence Award, Actor in a Soap Opera	Top Excellence Award, Actress in a Soap Opera
**Yeon Jung-hoon** – **My Healing Love**; Jeong Bo-seok – The Rich Son; Kim Ji-hoon – The Rich Son	**So Yoo-jin** – **My Healing Love**; Hong Soo-hyun – The Rich Son; Kim Ju-hyeon – The Rich Son; Lee Il-hwa – Secrets and Lies
Excellence Award, Actor in a Monday-Tuesday Miniseries	Excellence Award, Actress in a Monday-Tuesday Miniseries
**Woo Do-hwan** – **Tempted**; Ha Jun – Bad Papa; Park Eun-seok – Partners for Justice; Park Ho-san – Less Than Evil	**Moon Ka-young** – **Tempted**; Park Soo-young – Tempted; Lee Seol – Less Than Evil; Yoon Joo-hee – Risky Romance
Excellence Award, Actor in a Wednesday-Thursday Miniseries	Excellence Award, Actress in a Wednesday-Thursday Miniseries
**Jang Ki-yong** – **Come and Hug Me**; Kim Jun-han – Time; Lee Yi-kyung – Children of Nobody; Son Ho-jun – My Secret Terrius	**Jung In-sun** – **My Secret Terrius**; Hwang Seung-eon – Time; Im Se-mi – My Secret Terrius; Jin Ki-joo – Come and Hug Me; Nam Gyu-ri – Children of Nobody
Excellence Award, Actor in a Weekend Special Project	Excellence Award, Actress in a Weekend Special Project
**Jung Sang-hoon** – **My Contracted Husband, Mr. Oh**; Jung Woong-in – Goodbye to Goodbye; Kim Young-min – Hide and Seek; Lee Chun-hee – A Pledge to God	**Jo Bo-ah** – **Goodbye to Goodbye**; Han Sun-hwa – My Contracted Husband, Mr. Oh; Oh Yoon-ah – A Pledge to God; Uhm Hyun-kyung – Hide and Seek
Excellence Award, Actor in a Soap Opera	Excellence Award, Actress in a Soap Opera
**Lee Kyu-han** – **The Rich Son**; Yoon Jong-hoon – My Healing Love; Im Kang-sung – My Healing Love	**Park Joon-geum** – **My Healing Love**; Kim Hye-sun – Secrets and Lies; Yoon Yoo-sun – The Rich Son
Golden Acting Award, Actor	Golden Acting Award, Actress
**Huh Joon-ho** – **Come and Hug Me**	**Kang Boo-ja** – **A Pledge to God**
Best Supporting Cast in Monday-Tuesday Miniseries	Best Supporting Cast in Wednesday-Thursday Miniseries
**Kim Jae-kyung** – **Bad Papa**; Lee David – Bad Papa; Park Ji-bin – Bad Papa; Park Jun-gyu – Partners for Justice; Shin Sung-woo – Tempted	**Kang Ki-young** – **My Secret Terrius**; Kim Seo-hyung – Come and Hug Me; Kim Yeo-jin – Children of Nobody; Seo Hyun-woo – Time; Seo Jeong-yeon – Come and Hug Me
Best Supporting Cast in Weekend Special Project	Best Supporting Cast in Soap Opera
**Jung Hye-young** – **Goodbye to Goodbye**; Jo Mi-ryung – Hide and Seek; Lee Hwi-hyang – A Pledge to God; Oh Hyun-kyung – A Pledge to God; Yoon Da-gyeong – Hide and Seek	**Jeon No-min** – **Secrets and Lies**; Hwang Young-hee – My Healing Love; Kang Nam-gil – The Rich Son; Kim Hee-jung – Secrets and Lies; Lee Seung-yeon – The Rich Son
Best Young Actor	Best Young Actress
**Kim Gun-woo** – **My Secret Terrius**; **Wang Seok-hyeon** – **A Pledge to God**	**Jo Ye-rin** – **Hide and Seek**; **Lee Na-yoon** – **Hold Me Tight**; **Ok Ye-rin** – **My Secret Terrius**; **Ryu Han-bi** – **Come and Hug Me**; **Shin Bi** – **Goodbye to Goodbye**; **Shin Eun-soo** – **Bad Papa**
Best New Actor	Best New Actress
**Kim Kyung-nam** – **Come and Hug Me**; **Lee Jun-young** – **Goodbye to Goodbye**; Ha Jun – Bad Papa; Kim Min-jae – Tempted; Kim Min-kyu – The Rich Son	**Lee Seol** – **Less Than Evil**; **Oh Seung-ah** – **Secrets and Lies**; Moon Ka-young – Tempted; Park Soo-young – Tempted
PD Award	Writer of the Year
**Huh Joon-ho** – **Come and Hug Me**	**Oh Ji-young** – **My Secret Terrius**

=== Selfish Motive Awards ===
- Best Couple Award: **Jang Ki-yong** and **Jin Ki-joo** – **Come and Hug Me**
- Vocal King Award: **Jang Hyuk** – **Bad Papa**
- Organic Parody Award: **Kim Kang-woo** and **Uee** – **My Contracted Husband, Mr. Oh**
- Frustrator Award: **Woo Do-hwan** and **Park Soo-young** – **Tempted**
- Fighting Performer Award: **Seohyun** – **Time**
- In Awe Award: **Shin Ha-kyun** – **Less Than Evil**
- Bromance Award: **Son Ho-jun**, **So Ji-sub**, and **Kang Ki-young** – **My Secret Terrius**

== Presenters ==
Order	Presenter	Award
1	Woo Do-hwan, Lee Yoo-ri	Best New Actor/Actress
2	Han Hyun-min, Im Se-mi	Best Supporting Cast in Weekend Special Project/Soap Opera
3	Jung Sang-hoon, Kim Kang-woo	Best Supporting Cast in Monday-Tuesday/Wednesday-Thursday Miniseries
4	Kang Ki-young, Kim Yeo-jin	PD Award and Writer of the Year
5	Chae Shi-ra	Golden Acting Award
6	Lee Sang-min, GFriend	Drama of the Year
7	Kim Myung-soo, So Yoo-jin	Excellence Award in Weekend Special Project/Soap Opera
8	Kim Seon-ho, Jeong Yu-mi	Excellence Award in a Miniseries
9	Kim Ji-seok, Huh Joon-ho	Top Excellence Award in a Weekend Special
10	Jang Ki-yong, Chae Soo-bin	Top Excellence Award in a Soap Opera
11	Ju Ji-hoon, Jin Se-yeon	Top Excellence Award in a Monday-Tuesday Miniseries
12	Yoo Seung-ho, Ha Ji-won	Top Excellence Award in a Wednesday-Thursday Miniseries
13	Kim Sang-joong	Grand Prize (Daesang)

== Special performances ==
Order	Artist	Song
1	Cho Ye-rin, Kim Gun-woo, Lee Na-yoon, Ok Ye-rin, Shin Bi	"Love Scenario (사랑을 했다)"
2	Seunghee of Oh My Girl	"Back in Time" (시간을 거슬러) (Moon Embracing the Sun OST)
2	Seunghee of Oh My Girl	"Pit-a-Pat" (두근두근) (The Greatest Love OST)
2	Muzie	"Fate" (인연) (Phoenix OST)
2	Muzie	"Even After Ten Years" (십년이 지나도) (Sad Love Story OST)
2	Seunghee of Oh My Girl and Muzie	"Perhaps Love" (사랑인가요) (Princess Hours OST)
3	GFriend	"Time for the Moon Night (밤)"

== See also ==
- 2018 KBS Drama Awards
- 2018 SBS Drama Awards
