= Destined with You =

2023 South Korean television series

- Promotional poster
- Hangul: 이 연애는 불가항력
- Hanja: 이 戀愛는 不可抗力
- Lit.: This Love Is Irresistible
- RR: I yeonaeneun bulgahangnyeok
- MR: I yŏnaenŭn pulgahangnyŏk
- Genre: Fantasy; Romance
- Written by: Noh Ji-sul
- Directed by: Nam Ki-hoon
- Starring: Jo Bo-ah; Rowoon; Ha Jun; Yura
- Music by: Gaemi
- Country of origin: South Korea
- Original language: Korean
- No. of episodes: 16

Production
- Executive producers: Park Sung-eun; Song Kyung-soo; Jeong Hwa-young
- Producers: Beak Chang-joo; Kim Seo-kwon
- Editor: Oh Sang-hwan
- Production companies: SLL; C-JeS

Original release
- Network: JTBC
- Release: August 23 – October 12, 2023

Destined with You (Korean: 이 연애는 불가항력) is a 2023 South Korean television series starring Jo Bo-ah, Rowoon, Ha Jun, and Yura. It aired on JTBC from August 23 to October 12, 2023, airing every Wednesday and Thursday at 22:30 (KST). It is also available for streaming on Netflix in selected regions.

== Synopsis ==
Destined with You tells the story about an irresistible romance between Lee Hong-jo (Jo Bo-ah) and Jang Shin-yu (Rowoon) with the storyline revolving around a forbidden book that was thoroughly sealed 300 years ago, landing in the hands of Hong-jo after obtaining it with Shin-yu becoming the current victim of the forbidden book's curse.

== Cast and characters ==
=== Main ===
- Jo Bo-ah as Lee Hong-jo

A 9th-level civil servant of the Department of Greenery at Onju City Hall.

- Rowoon as Jang Shin-yu

An ace lawyer.

- Ha Jun as Kwon Jae-kyung

Aide at Onju City Hall whom Hong-jo has a crush on.

- Yura as Yoon Na-yeon

Shin-yu's girlfriend.

=== Supporting ===
==== Staff in the city hall ====
- Hyun Bong-sik as Gong Seo-gu

The team leader of the Environment and Greenery Department of Onju City Hall.

- Lee Bong-ryun as Ma Eun-yeong

The manager of the Environment and Greenery Department of Onju City Hall.

- Park Kyung-hye as Son Sae-byeol

A member of the Environment and Greenery Department of Onju City Hall.

- Miram as Yoo Soo-jeong

A member of the Environment and Greenery Department of Onju City Hall.

- Song Young-kyu as Yoon Hak-young

Na-yeon's father and the mayor of Onju City Hall.

- Ahn Sang-woo as Na Jung-beom

CEO of Green Landscape Garden.

- Lim Hyeon-soo as Park Ki-dong

The second-in-command in charge of the legal team at Onju City Hall.

- Yoon Soon-woong as Oh Sam-sik

The eldest public worker managed by Hong-jo.

- Park Jae-joon as Oh Woo-ram

Sam-sik's grandson.

==== People around Shin-yu ====
- Lee Pil-mo as Jang Se-hun

Shin-yu's father who is a CEO of Bau Construction.

- Jung Hye-young as Song Yoon-joo

Shin-yu's mother.

- Kim Hye-ok as Eun-wol

A shaman.

=== Extended ===
- Lee Tae-ri as Kim Wook

Shin-yu's best friend who is a lawyer.

- Baek Seung-hee as Concubine Jung

She works with Primrose as a shaman.

=== Special appearances ===
- Yoon Kye-sang as CEO Lawfirm Law & High
- Kim Do-yeon as Noise complaint woman
- Kim Kwon as Lee Hyeon-seo
- Yoon Jung-hoon as Do Min-hoon

== Viewership ==
Destined with You : South Korea viewers per episode (thousands)

| Season | Episode number | | | | | | | | | | | | | | | |
| Season | 1 | 2 | 3 | 4 | 5 | 6 | 7 | 8 | 9 | 10 | 11 | 12 | 13 | 14 | 15 | 16 |
|---|---|---|---|---|---|---|---|---|---|---|---|---|---|---|---|---|
| 1 | 625 | 546 | N/A | 558 | 596 | 528 | 576 | 583 | 565 | 574 | N/A | 492 | 446 | 651 | 638 | 648 |

Source: Audience measurement performed nationwide by Nielsen Korea.

Average TV viewership ratings
| Ep. | Original broadcast date | Average audience share (Nielsen Korea) | |
| Ep. | Original broadcast date | Nationwide | Seoul |
|---|---|---|---|
| 1 | August 23, 2023 | 2.912% (8th) | 2.931% (7th) |
| 2 | August 24, 2023 | 2.393% (15th) | 2.606% (6th) |
| 3 | August 30, 2023 | 2.009% (14th) | N/A |
| 4 | August 31, 2023 | 2.774% (7th) | 2.898% (4th) |
| 5 | September 6, 2023 | 2.801% (4th) | 2.508% (5th) |
| 6 | September 7, 2023 | 2.565% (8th) | 2.372% (8th) |
| 7 | September 13, 2023 | 2.851% (7th) | 3.134% (4th) |
| 8 | September 14, 2023 | 2.946% (7th) | 3.144% (5th) |
| 9 | September 20, 2023 | 2.588% (15th) | 2.774% (6th) |
| 10 | September 21, 2023 | 2.553% (13th) | 2.764% (8th) |
| 11 | September 27, 2023 | 2.046% (16th) | 2.397% (4th) |
| 12 | September 28, 2023 | 2.092% (13th) | 2.099% (9th) |
| 13 | October 4, 2023 | 2.213% (12th) | 2.264% (6th) |
| 14 | October 5, 2023 | 3.070% (3rd) | 3.416% (2nd) |
| 15 | October 11, 2023 | 2.875% (6th) | 3.096% (3rd) |
| 16 | October 12, 2023 | 3.122% (5th) | 3.317% (4th) |
| Average | | 2.613% | — (Note: Due to multiple unpublished ratings, the exact average rating is unknown.) |
In the table above, the blue numbers represent the lowest ratings and the red numbers represent the highest ratings.; N/A denotes ratings that were not published.; This series aired on a cable channel/pay TV which normally has a relatively smaller audience compared to free-to-air TV/public broadcasters (KBS, SBS, MBC and EBS).
