= Military Prosecutor Doberman =

2022 South Korean television series

- Promotional poster
- Hangul: 군검사 도베르만
- Hanja: 軍檢事 도베르만
- RR: Gungeomsa Dobereuman
- MR: Kun'gŏmsa Toberŭman
- Genre: Military; Legal
- Written by: Yoon Hyun-mo
- Directed by: Jin Chang-gyu
- Starring: Ahn Bo-hyun; Jo Bo-ah
- Music by: Kim Jang-woo
- Country of origin: South Korea
- Original language: Korean
- No. of episodes: 16

Production
- Executive producer: Lee Hye-young
- Producers: Lee Myung-jin; Lee Yu-bin
- Running time: 60 minutes
- Production companies: Studio Dragon; Logos Film

Original release
- Network: tvN
- Release: February 28 – April 26, 2022

Military Prosecutor Doberman (Korean: 군검사 도베르만; RR: Gungeomsa Dobereuman) is a South Korean television series starring Ahn Bo-hyun and Jo Bo-ah. It aired on tvN from February 28 to April 26, 2022, every Monday and Tuesday at 22:30 (KST) for 16 episodes.

== Synopsis ==
Military Prosecutor Doberman tells the story of Do Bae-man (Ahn Bo-hyun), who initially became a military prosecutor for money, fame and revenge against those who killed his parents. While he impatiently awaits his retirement day, he crosses paths with Cha Woo-in (Jo Bo-ah), who was born into a chaebol family and who became a military prosecutor to exact her own revenge.

== Cast ==
=== Main ===
- Ahn Bo-hyun as Captain Do Bae-man

A military prosecutor who tried to avoid military service by getting expelled from his high school after the death of his parents in a car accident 20 years ago. Despite that, he is able to pass the Bar exam and goes on to become a lawyer. However, his job applications are all rejected by multiple law firms due to his low education background. His determination and intelligence catches the attention of a corrupt, short-tempered lawyer called Yong Moon-goo who offers him a job in his law firm on condition that he first work as a military prosecutor for five years. At first he was a very opportunistic individual, as he worked solely for money and willed to seek more profitable opportunities through people around him or Yong Moon-goo, much to the latter's annoyance. However he met a new female military prosecutor that radically changed his point of view. Secretly, he investigates the culprit behind his parents' death.

- Jo Bo-ah as Captain Cha Woo-in

A new military prosecutor who is the only daughter of a conglomerate. She presents herself as a by the book military lawyer, but she is actually highly intelligent and skilled in the martial arts, which she tries to reveal to Do Bae-man slowly. She is able to predict most of her adversaries' movements. Sometimes, she disguised herself as a woman wearing a red wig in order to carry revenge to those who wronged others, like Han Se-na. She seeks to use Do Bae-man for her plan to get revenge for the destruction of her father's defense company IM Defense when it is framed for corruption and then acquired at a knockdown price by a client of Yong Moon-goo. The corruption charge led to her father's arrest; he died shortly afterward in a shady car accident that involved Noh Hwa-young.

- Oh Yeon-soo as Major General Noh Hwa-young

A corrupt owner of IM Defense and also the first female division commander since the founding of the army who beats out competition from a hundred male soldiers who covet her place. She behaves harshly toward her son, Noh Tae-nam, especially when he misbehaves and disgraces her name, and inflicts traumatizing punishment on him, such as asking him to hold a live grenade. However she let her son becomes chairman of IM Defense so that she can fulfil her military career ambition. She commits profiteering through her ownership in IM Defense and her position in the military. She was also responsible for the death of Bae-man's parents, Woo-in's father's accident and other crimes. She is the main antagonist of the series. In the final episode, she was later exposed for corruption, and sentenced to death for multiple murders and other crimes.

- Kim Young-min as Yong Moon-goo

A corrupt, short-tempered lawyer and former prosecutor from a special division. He gets angry easily if things are not working as planned or when he was felt betrayed (mostly by Do Bae-man's opportunistic behavior). He usually uses coercion and threats against witnesses or manipulates evidences that potentially harm his clients at the court. He works for Commander Noh by keeping her reputation as the highest woman in the military as clean as possible. He also reports to her on Noh Tae-man's misbehavior so she can directly punish him. However behind Noh Hwa-young's back, he wants to own IM Defense for his own. He was later jailed for being Hwa-young's accomplice in her criminal acts.

- Kim Woo-suk as Noh Tae-nam

Son of Noh Hwa-young and also a third-generation chaebol who becomes the chairman of IM Defense in his late 20s. He also owns a bar named Cartel, where he and a celebrity singer named Alan regularly invite women whom they drug, sexually assault and rape while videotaping them. Even though he acts rude toward other older people (such as Do Bae-man and Yong Moon-goo) and tough when committing crimes, he is deeply frightened of his mother and mandatory military service. Due to relentless bullying while in the military, he slowly matured and realized the error of his ways, as well as his mother's. He was close to his pet dog "Bolt", whom he treated with affection and compassion.

=== Supporting ===
==== People around Do Bae-man ====
- Kang Mal-geum as Do Soo-kyung

Do Bae-man's aunt, who raised Do Bae-man after his parents died. She is a veteran homicide detective who, together with Cha Woo-in, helps Han Se-na after she was assaulted by Alan and Noh Tae-man. She later dated Bae-man's superior Joo-hyuk and had a child with him after their marriage.

- Kwon Dong-ho as Seo Rak

CEO of Seorak Cheonji, an illegal gang-related business. He hold grudges against Do Bae-man after his father was sent to prison. However, he and his gang was humiliated by Cha Woo-in.

- Lee Jin-soo as Do Sung-hwan

Do Bae-man's father, 20 years ago, worked as a military judge in the 58th Army Brigade. He died in a fiery car accident orchestrated by Noh Hwa-young.

- Chae Song-hwa as Yoo Jung-yeon

Do Bae-man's mother, 20 years ago, worked as a military judge in the 58th Army Brigade. She died in the same car accident.

==== People around Cha Woo-in ====
- Kang Young-seok as Kang Ha-joon

Owner of Kang's Solution, a company in military industry. His company was supported by Cha Woo-in's father, therefore he helped Cha Woo-in in accomplishing her goal

- Yoo Hye-in as Han Se-na

A model and a fan of idol singer Alan. She sent an Instagram DM to him and got a response. She was excited to meet Alan in Noh Tae-nam's nightclub. However her meeting with Tae-nam and Alan was the beginning of her misfortune, that leads to Cha Woo-in setting up revenge upon Alan and his friends in his penthouse.

==== Patriotic Association member ====
- Nam Kyung-eup as Minister of Defense Lee Jae-sik

The leader of the Patriotic Society. He was a 4-Star General who later assumed the post of National Defense Minister.

- Lee Jung-yeon as Hong Moo-seop

Commander of the 4th Squadron. An elite who rose to the position after graduating from the sixth grade and passed the bar exam. Among the members of the Patriotic Association, he is the least revealing of himself. He has been faithful to Lee Jae-sik for a long time, but his position is being narrowed by being obscured by Noh Hwa-young. He pretends to be generous on the outside, but if he catches Noh Hwa-young's weakness at any time, he is determined to target her weakness. He was also involved in assaulting his assistants and lower-ranked recruits, both physically and sexually. Bae-man successfully prosecutes him for these allegations and allowed Moo-seop to serve a three-year term of imprisonment for his crimes.

- Lim Cheol-hyung as Won Ki-chun

Commander of the 4th Battalion Search Battalion and the youngest member of the Patriotic Association, a secret organization in the army in which Noh Noh-young was the first female corps commander. He was initially thought to have heroically saved a recruit at a minefield and lost a leg, but it was revealed he intentionally shot the recruit and his leg was deliberately amputated by Noh Hwa-young as part of his facade in order for him to be a politician after his retirement. He was later killed by Hwa-young upon the exposure of his facade.

==== People around Noh Hwa-young ====
- Jo Hye-won as Yang Jong-sook

Noh Hwa-young assistant. She was sexually assaulted by Hong Moo-seop in the past, and unlike Hwa-young, she was morally-conflicted by her and Hwa-young's immoral acts.

==== Military Law Office People ====
- Lee Tae-hyung as Yeom Sang-jin

A veteran investigator from the 58th Division's Military Law Office. He used to work for Bae-man's parents and was the investigator in charge of the investigation of the accident that killed Bae-man's parents 20 years ago.

==== Military Law Office, 4th Infantry Division ====
- Park Jin-woo as Seo Joo-hyuk

Legal advisor with authority in the 4th Infantry Division Military Law Office, he was the direct superior of Do Bae-man and Cha Woo-in, the highest rank in the military law firm. He later dated Bae-man's aunt and became her husband.

- Go Geon-han as Yoon Sang-gi

A military investigator in the Military Law Office and loyal assistant of Do Bae-man, who has excellent computer use and driving skills.

- Kim Han-na as Ahn Yu-ra

An investigator and Cha Woo-in's assistant.

==== Others ====
- Park Sang-nam as Alan

A handsome idol singer and Noh Tae-nam's close friend. Both of them often hang out in Cartel and commit gross misdeeds toward women they invite. One of his victims was his own fan Han Se-na, who asks Cha Woo-in for help. Cha Woo-in confronts and then kidnaps him and his friends in his penthouse.

- Ryu Seong-rok as Ahn Soo-ho

A Sergeant Major, he is the son of the president of Gusan Bank. He is double-faced and pretends to be a "good guy" when he has actually committed murder in the past during his school days. Out of revenge due to Bae-man arresting him, he met up with Seo Rak and asked him to help kill Bae-man. Later, Bae-man instigates him to bully Tae-nam by pointing that the real culprit responsible for his conviction was Tae-nam. Soo-ho later became one of the deceased victims of the military camp mass shooting case.

- Kim Byung-chun as Military judge
- Kim Yo-han as Pyun Sang-Ho

An obese but friendly recruit who befriends Tae-nam, and was the only person in the army who treats Tae-nam with kindness and compassion. However, due to excessive bullying and sexual abuse by the other recruits, Sang-ho went berserk and committed a mass shooting, which killed thirteen people. As the result, he was sentenced to death by the military court; the surviving bullies were subsequently punished for their wrongdoings as well.

=== Special appearance ===
- Baek Hyun-joo as Hong Kyung-ok

The younger sister of the corps commander Hong Mu-seop.

- Nam Mi-jung as Ms. Paeng (Ep. 4-6)

== Production ==
On January 25, 2022, photos from the first script reading were published.

== Original soundtrack ==
=== Part 1 ===
Released on March 8, 2022
No.	Title	Lyrics	Music	Artist	Length
1.	"Doberman" (도베르만)	Jay Kim; Kim Beom-joo (A.muse); Kim Si-hyuk (A.muse); Nam Gi-moon (A.muse)	Jay Kim; Kim Beom-joo (A.muse); Kim Si-hyuk (A.muse); Nam Gi-moon (A.muse)	Ha Hyun-woo	3:07
2.	"Doberman" (도베르만; Inst.)		Jay Kim; Kim Beom-joo (A.muse); Kim Si-hyuk (A.muse); Nam Gi-moon (A.muse)		3:07
Total length:					6:14

=== Part 2 ===
Released on March 15, 2022
No.	Title	Lyrics	Music	Artist	Length
1.	"My Zone"	Snnny; Joy Yang	Snnny	Saay	2:28
2.	"My Zone" (Inst.)		Snnny		2:28
Total length:					4:56

=== Part 3 ===
Released on March 22, 2022
No.	Title	Lyrics	Music	Artist	Length
1.	"Ignite"	Jay Kim; Kim Beom-joo; Kim Si-hyuk	Jay Kim; Kim Beom-joo; Kim Si-hyuk	Yelo	3:58
2.	"Ignite" (Inst.)		Jay Kim; Kim Beom-joo; Kim Si-hyuk		3:58
Total length:					7:56

=== Part 4 ===
Released on April 5, 2022
No.	Title	Lyrics	Music	Artist	Length
1.	"Dive in"	Jay Kim; Kim Beom-joo; Kim Si-hyuk	Jay Kim; Kim Beom-joo; Kim Si-hyuk	Hong Isaac	3:59
2.	"Dive in" (Inst.)		Jay Kim; Kim Beom-joo; Kim Si-hyuk		3:59
Total length:					7:58

=== Part 5 ===
Released on April 12, 2022
No.	Title	Lyrics	Music	Artist	Length
1.	"Flame" (불꽃)	Nmore (Prismfilter); Gesture (Prismfilter)	Nmore (Prismfilter); Gesture (Prismfilter)	Kim Han-gyeom	3:22
2.	"Flame" (불꽃; Inst.)		Nmore (Prismfilter); Gesture (Prismfilter)		3:22
Total length:					6:44

== Viewership ==
Military Prosecutor Doberman : South Korea viewers per episode (millions)

Season	Episode number																Average
Season	1	2	3	4	5	6	7	8	9	10	11	12	13	14	15	16	Average
1	1.263	1.576	1.589	1.838	1.780	2.088	1.712	1.935	1.737	1.615	1.606	1.935	1.753	1.896	1.930	2.279	1.783

Source: Audience measurement performed nationwide by Nielsen Korea.

Average TV viewership ratings
Ep.	Original broadcast date	Average audience share (Nielsen Korea)	
Ep.	Original broadcast date	Nationwide	Seoul
1	February 28, 2022	5.263% (1st)	5.862% (1st)
2	March 1, 2022	7.009% (1st)	8.119% (1st)
3	March 7, 2022	7.201% (1st)	7.701% (1st)
4	March 8, 2022	7.878% (1st)	8.387% (1st)
5	March 14, 2022	7.928% (1st)	8.888% (1st)
6	March 15, 2022	8.666% (1st)	10.016% (1st)
7	March 21, 2022	7.832% (1st)	9.022% (1st)
8	March 22, 2022	8.791% (1st)	9.794% (1st)
9	April 4, 2022	7.676% (1st)	8.405% (1st)
10	April 5, 2022	7.424% (1st)	8.436% (1st)
11	April 11, 2022	7.473% (1st)	8.423% (1st)
12	April 12, 2022	8.742% (1st)	9.498% (1st)
13	April 18, 2022	8.248% (1st)	9.538% (1st)
14	April 19, 2022	8.848% (1st)	10.492% (1st)
15	April 25, 2022	8.641% (1st)	9.465% (1st)
16	April 26, 2022	10.081% (1st)	10.966% (1st)
Average		7.981%	8.938%
In the table above, the blue numbers represent the lowest ratings and the red numbers represent the highest ratings.; This drama airs on a cable channel/pay TV which normally has a relatively smaller audience compared to free-to-air TV/public broadcasters (KBS, SBS, MBC and EBS).; Episode 9 onwards were pushed back by a week due to the broadcast of 2022 FIFA World Cup qualification match airing on the timeslot of Episode 9 and 10.
