= Chae Shi-ra =

South Korean actress (born 1968)

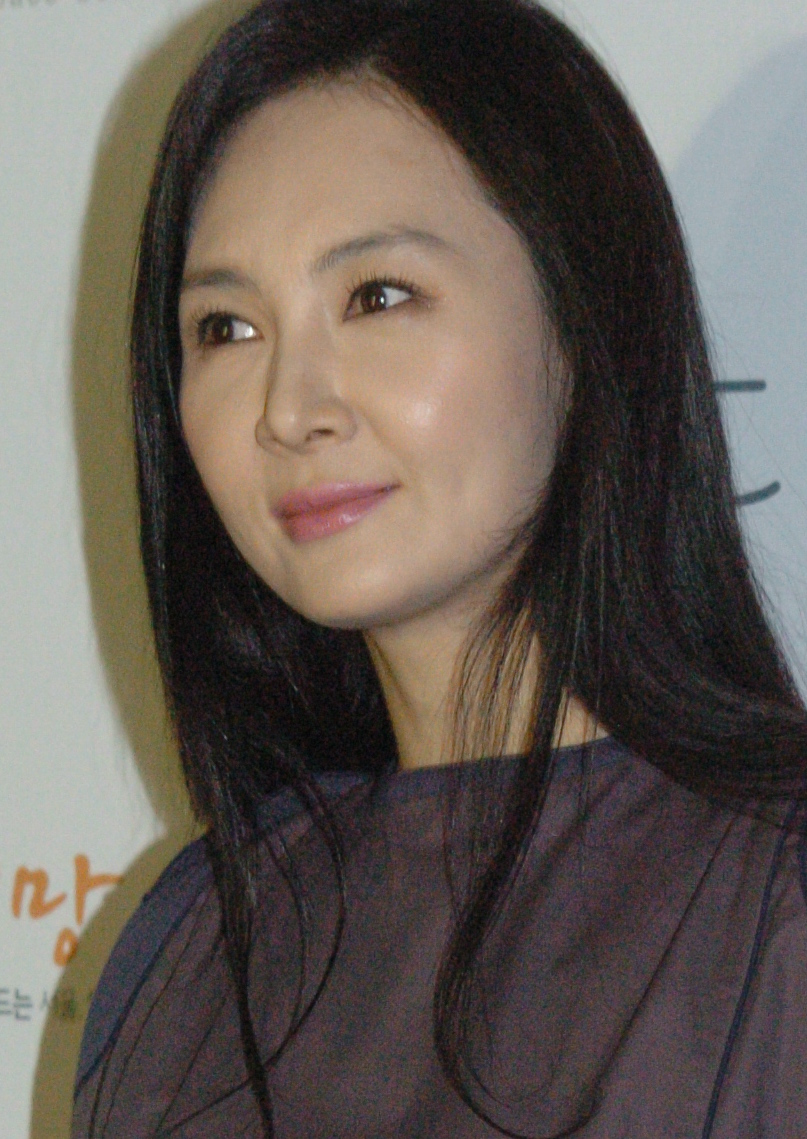
- Chae in April 2012
- Born: June 25, 1968 (age 58); Seoul, South Korea
- Occupation: Actress
- Years active: 1983–present
- Agent: C-JeS Entertainment
- Spouse: Kim Tae-wook (m. 2000)
- Children: 2

Korean name
- Hangul: 채시라
- Hanja: 蔡時那
- RR: Chae Sira
- MR: Ch'ae Sira

Chae Shi-ra (Korean: 채시라; born June 25, 1968) is a South Korean actress born in Seoul. Chae acted in Eyes of Dawn in the 1990s. She has since been referred to as one of the prominent actresses of that decade, along with Kim Hee-ae and Ha Hee-ra.

== Personal life ==
Chae married singer Kim Tae-hook in 2000 and they have two children. A Roman Catholic, Chae served as ambassador to Pope Francis' visit to Korea in 2014.

== Filmography ==
=== Film ===
Year	English title	Korean title	Romanization	Role	Director	Ref.
1994	Mom, the Star and the Sea Anemone		Eomma-wa byeolgwa malmijal			
1995	Sunset into the Neon Lights		Ne-onsog-eulo no-euljida			
1995	Hong Kil-Dong		Dol-a-on yeong-ung Hong Gildong			

=== Television series ===
Year	Title	Role	Ref.
1983	A Diary of High School Students		
1987	Kkochimi		
1988	MBC Best Theatre: "A Fairy of Shampoo"		
1989	The Giant	Seo Gyeong-ju	
1989	500 Years of Joseon Dynasty: "Pamun"		
1990	Gaksibang Sarang Yeollyeonne		
1990	Two Diaries	Mi-hui	
1991	Eyes of Dawn	Yun Yeo-ok	
1992	The Son and Daughter	Mi-hyeon	
1993	Pilot	No Hye-ran	
1994	The Moon of Seoul	Yeong-suk	
1994	The Girl of My Son	Kim Chae-won	
1995	APT		
1995	Choe Seung-hui	Choe Seung-hui	
1996	Dangerous Love	Jang Yun-ju	
1997	Mimang	Jeon Tae-im	
1998	The King and the Queen	Queen Dowager Insoo	
1998	The Legend of Ambition	Kim In-ae	
2000	Viva Women	Da-yeong	
2002	The Golden Age of the Maeng Family	Maeng Geum-ja	
2004	Conditions for Love	Gang Geum-pa	
2004	Emperor of the Sea	Madam Jami	
2006	Invisible man, Choe Jang-su	O So-yeong	
2009	Empress Cheonchu	Empress Cheonchu	
2011	Insu, the Queen Mother	Queen Insoo	
2012	Five Fingers	Chae Yeong-rang	
2015	Unkind Ladies	Kim Hyun-sook	
2018	Goodbye to Goodbye	Seo Young-hee	
2019	The Banker	Han Soo-ji	

== Awards and nominations ==
Name of the award ceremony, year presented, category, nominee of the award, and the result of the nomination
Award ceremony	Year	Category	Nominee / Work	Result	Ref.
APAN Star Awards	2015	Top Excellence Award, Actress in a Serial Drama	Unkind Ladies	Nominated	
APAN Star Awards	2018	Top Excellence Award, Actress in a Serial Drama	Goodbye to Goodbye	Nominated	
Baeksang Arts Awards	1990	Best New Actress – Television	The Giant	Won	
Baeksang Arts Awards	1992	Best Actress – Television	Eyes of Dawn	Won	
Baeksang Arts Awards	1995	Most Popular Actress – Television	The Girl of My Son	Won	
KBS Drama Awards	1998	Top Excellence Award, Actress	The Legend of Ambition	Won	
KBS Drama Awards	1999	Grand Prize (Daesang)	The King and Queen	Won	
KBS Drama Awards	1999	Top Excellence Award, Actress	The King and Queen	Nominated	
KBS Drama Awards	2004	Top Excellence Award, Actress	Terms of Endearment	Won	
KBS Drama Awards	2005	Top Excellence Award, Actress	Emperor of the Sea	Nominated	
KBS Drama Awards	2006	Top Excellence Award, Actress	Invisible Man, Choi Jang-soo	Nominated	
KBS Drama Awards	2009	Top Excellence Award, Actress	Empress Cheonchu	Won	
KBS Drama Awards	2015	Top Excellence Award, Actress	Unkind Ladies	Won	
KBS Drama Awards	2015	Excellence Award, Actress in a Mid-length Drama	Unkind Ladies	Nominated	
MBC Drama Awards	1989	Excellence Award, Actress	500 Years of Joseon Dynasty - Pamun	Won	
MBC Drama Awards	1991	Top Excellence Award, Actress	Eyes of Dawn	Won	
MBC Drama Awards	1993	Top Excellence Award, Actress	The Son and Daughter	Won	
MBC Drama Awards	1994	Grand Prize (Daesang)	The Moon of Seoul	Won	
MBC Drama Awards	1995	Grand Prize (Daesang)	The Girl of My Son, APT	Won	
MBC Drama Awards	2018	Grand Prize (Daesang)	Goodbye to Goodbye	Nominated	
MBC Drama Awards	2018	Top Excellence Award, Actress in a Weekend Drama	Goodbye to Goodbye	Won	
MBC Drama Awards	2019	Top Excellence Award, Actress in a Wednesday-Thursday Miniseries	The Banker	Nominated	
SBS Drama Awards	2000	Top Excellence Award, Actress	Viva Women	Won	
SBS Drama Awards	2012	Top Excellence Award, Actress in a Weekend/Daily Drama	Five Fingers	Nominated	
SBS Drama Awards	2012	PD Award	Five Fingers	Won	
SBS Drama Awards	2012	Top 10 Stars	Five Fingers	Won	
