= Forest (TV series) =

2020 South Korean television series

- Forest promotional poster
- Hangul: 포레스트
- RR: Poreseuteu
- MR: P'oresŭt'ŭ
- Genre: Drama; Medical; Romance
- Written by: Lee Sun-Young
- Directed by: Oh Jong-rok (Note: Also a co-executive producer of the series through his "Star Force" production banner)
- Starring: Park Hae-jin; Jo Bo-ah
- Country of origin: South Korea
- Original language: Korean
- No. of episodes: 32 (Note: In order to circumvent Korean laws that prevent commercial breaks in the middle of an episode, what would previously have been aired as single 70 minute episodes are now being repackaged as two 35 minute episodes, with two episodes being shown each night with a commercial break between the two.)

Production
- Camera setup: Single-camera
- Running time: 35 minutes
- Production companies: iHQ; Star Force; Gazi Contents

Original release
- Network: KBS2
- Release: January 29 – March 19, 2020

Forest (Korean: 포레스트) is a 2020 South Korean television series starring Park Hae-jin and Jo Bo-ah. It aired on KBS2 from January 29 to March 19, 2020.

== Cast ==
=== Main ===
- Park Hae-jin as Kang San-hyuk
  - Choi Seung-hoon as young Kang San-hyuk
- Jo Bo-ah as Jung Young-jae
  - Lee Go-eun as young Jung Young-jae
- Jung Yeon-joo as Oh Bo-mi
- No Gwang-sik as Choi Chang

=== Recurring ===
==== 119 Rescue Team ====
- Ryu Seung-soo as Bong Dae-yong
- Woo Jung-kook as Ki Pil-young
- Geum Kwang-san as Yang Chul-sik
- Kim Eun-soo as Gook Soon-tae
- Myung Jae-hwan as Kim Man-soo

==== Miryeong Hospital ====
- Ahn Sang-woo as Park Jin-man
- Go Soo-hee as Nurse Kim
- Lee Nam-hee as Hospital Director

==== Red Line Investments ====
- Lee Si-hoon as Park Hyung-soo
- Kim Su-hyeon as Chairman Jang
- Jung Soo-gyo as Han Ji-yong

==== Taeseong Group ====
- Choi Kwang-il as Kwon Joo-han
- Kim Young-pil as Jo Kwang-pil

=== Others ===
- Park Ji-il as Jung Byung-hyuk
- Lee Do-kyung as Choi Jung-mok
- Jung Myung-joon as Shin Joon-young
- Heo Ji-won as Cha Jin-woo
- Choi Beom-ho as Seo Seok-yong
- Kim Min-seok
- Han Chul-woo

=== Special appearances ===
- Grace Lee as Professor presenting conference materials on Bangladesh epidemic cases (episode 20)
- Jeong Moon-ho
- Kim Choong-sik

== Production ==
- Early working title was Secret.
- Filming finished in August 2019. Drama series airs as a completed production.

== Ratings ==
In this table, the blue numbers represent the lowest ratings and the red numbers represent the highest ratings.

Ep.	Original broadcast date	Average audience share
Ep.	Original broadcast date	Nielsen Korea
Ep.	Original broadcast date	Nationwide
1	January 29, 2020	7.1%
2	January 29, 2020	7.4%
3	January 30, 2020	4.7%
4	January 30, 2020	5.1%
5	February 5, 2020	6.2%
6	February 5, 2020	6.9%
7	February 6, 2020	5.2%
8	February 6, 2020	5.3%
9	February 12, 2020	6.1%
10	February 12, 2020	7.4%
11	February 13, 2020	4.8%
12	February 13, 2020	5.2%
13	February 19, 2020	5.5%
14	February 19, 2020	6.2%
15	February 20, 2020	4.1%
16	February 20, 2020	4.1%
17	February 26, 2020	5.2%
18	February 26, 2020	5.8%
19	February 27, 2020	4.3%
20	February 27, 2020	4.9%
21	March 4, 2020	4.8%
22	March 4, 2020	4.5%
23	March 5, 2020	3.5%
24	March 5, 2020	3.6%
25	March 11, 2020	4.2%
26	March 11, 2020	4.7%
27	March 12, 2020	2.6%
28	March 12, 2020	3.1%
29	March 18, 2020	4.3%
30	March 18, 2020	4.2%
31	March 19, 2020	4.3%
32	March 19, 2020	5.3%
Average		5.0%
