= Im Kang-sung =

South Korean actor

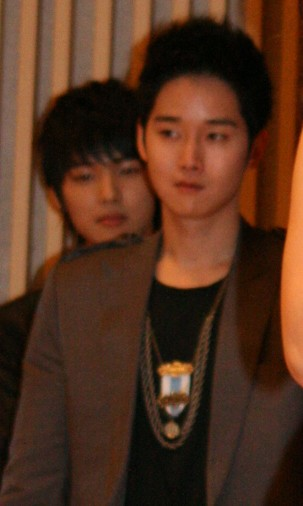
- Im in 2009
- Born: Im Do-gyoo; 23 December 1981 (age 44); Goyang, South Korea
- Other names: Lim Do-gyu, Lim Do-gyoo, Lim Kang-sung, Lim Kang-seong, Im Kang-seong, Lim Gang-seong
- Education: Kyung Hee University (Graduate School of Art Fusion Design Performing Art)
- Occupations: Actor; singer
- Years active: 1997–present
- Agent: Steit Entertainment
- Spouses: Lee Seul-ni (m. 2011; div. 2015) Lee Eun-yul (m. 2017)
- Musical career
- Instrument: Vocals
- Formerly of: S.A.V; Chowol; Cerulean Blue

Im Kang-sung is a South Korean actor and singer. He is known for his roles in dramas such as My Healing Love, Money Flower and Hidden Identity. He also appeared in movie Voice of Silence as Yong-seok.

== Personal life ==
Im Kang-sung was married to Lee Seul-ni in 2011 and they divorced in 2015. In 2017, he married Lee Eun-yul.

== Filmography ==
Key
†	Denotes films that have not yet been released

=== Film ===
Year	Title	Role	Ref.
2020	Voice of Silence	Yong-seok	
2023	How to Fall in Love with the Worst Neighbor: Untact Love	Chang Dong-won	

=== Television series ===
Year	Title	Role	Ref.
2010	It's Okay, Daddy's Girl	Jung Jin-goo	
2011	Warrior Baek Dong-soo	Hong Sa-hae	
2014	Dr. Frost	Kim Jung-hoon	
2015	Hidden Identity	Yoo Jin-woo	
2015	Yong-pal	Cha Sae-hoon	
2015	Cheo Yong 2	Jo Nam-ho	
2015	She Was Pretty	Ha-ri's date	
2017	Tunnel	Ma Young-gil	
2017	Witch at Court	Yoon Min-joo	
2018	Money Flower	Jang Yeo-cheon	
2018	Suits	Prosecutor	
2018	Matrimonial Chaos	Chief Department	
2018	My Healing Love	Park Jun-seung	
2019	Welcome to Waikiki 2	Yu-min	
2026	Reverse †		

=== Variety show ===
Year	Title	Role	Ref.
2015	King of Mask Singer	Contestant	

== Awards and nominations ==
Name of the award ceremony, year presented, category, nominee of the award, and the result of the nomination
Award ceremony	Year	Category	Nominee / Work	Result	Ref.
MBC Drama Awards	2018	Excellence Award, Actor in a Soap Opera	My Healing Love	Nominated	
