= Unkind Ladies =

2015 South Korean television series

- Also known as: Unkind Women
- Genre: Family; Drama; Romance
- Written by: Kim In-young
- Directed by: Yoo Hyun-ki; Han Sang-woo
- Starring: Kim Hye-ja; Chae Shi-ra; Do Ji-won; Lee Ha-na
- Composers: Park Sung-jin; Choi Min Chang
- Country of origin: South Korea
- Original language: Korean
- No. of episodes: 24

Production
- Executive producers: Shin In-soo; Jung Hae-ryong KBS
- Producers: Yoon Jae-hyuk; Kim Dong-hwi
- Production location: Korea
- Cinematography: Kim Kyung-ho
- Editors: Ahn Young-rok; Park Kyung-hyun
- Running time: 65 minutes
- Production company: IOK Media

Original release
- Network: KBS2
- Release: February 25 – May 14, 2015

Unkind Ladies (Korean: 착하지 않은 여자들; RR: Chakhaji aneun yeojadeul) is a 2015 South Korean television series starring Kim Hye-ja, Chae Shi-ra, Do Ji-won and Lee Ha-na. It aired on KBS2 from February 25 to May 14, 2015 on Wednesdays and Thursdays at 21:55 for 24 episodes.

== Plot ==
Three generations of a family of women are led by matriarch Kang Soon-ok, a famous cooking instructor to the rich and famous. Her older daughter Kim Hyun-jung is a rising network anchor at a television station, while younger daughter Kim Hyun-sook is the black sheep of the family. Jung Ma-ri is Hyun-sook's daughter but takes after her aunt by being accomplished, and is on track to become the youngest professor at the university where she works. Ma-ri gets caught up in a love triangle between a pair of half-brothers, reporter Lee Doo-jin and kendo instructor Lee Roo-oh.

== Cast ==
=== Main characters ===
- Kim Hye-ja as Kang Soon-ok
  - Lee Hang-na as 37-year-old Soon-ok
- Chae Shi-ra as Kim Hyun-sook
  - Ha Seung-ri as young Hyun-sook
- Do Ji-won as Kim Hyun-jung
  - Im Ju-yeon as young Hyun-jung
- Lee Ha-na as Jung Ma-ri

=== Supporting characters ===
- Jang Mi-hee as Jang Mo-ran
  - Ha Ji-eun as young Mo-ran
- Lee Soon-jae as Kim Chul-hee/Yang Mi-nam
  - Kim Hyun-goon as young Chul-hee
- Lee Mi-do as Park Eun-shil
- Park Hyuk-kwon as Jung Goo-min
  - Yoon Jong-hoon as young Goo-min
- Seo Yi-sook as Na Hyun-ae/Na Mal-nyeon
- Kim Hye-eun as Ahn Jong-mi
  - Kim Min-young as young Jong-mi
- Son Chang-min as Lee Moon-hak
- Yoo Se-hyung as Yoo Se-hyeong
- Song Jae-rim as Lee Roo-oh
- Kim Ji-seok as Lee Doo-jin
- Choi Jung-woo as Han Choong-gil
- Jung Ji-soon as Sun Dong-tae
- Song Young-gyu as Lee Moon-soo (flashback)
- Park Ji-a as Vocalist
- Chae Sang-woo as Gook Young-soo
- Kim Min-young as Ahn Jong-mi
- Ji Yi-soo as Jae-kyung
- Ham Sung-min as Student
- Oh Hee-joon as Instructor Kim
- Jang Kyung-ae as Mari's friend
- Lee Seung-hyun as Na Boo-gil
- Kwon Il-soo as martial artist extra

=== Cameos ===
- Jang Gwang as traditional fortune-teller (episode 1)
- Joo Jong-hyuk as Ma-ri's student (episode 1)
- Julian Quintart as Leif Garrett (flashbacks)
- Lee Sang-yoon as top star (episode 3)
- Boyfriend as popular idol group (episode 5)
- Park Chil-yong as jewelry appraiser (Ahn Jong-mi's uncle; episode 6)
- Choi Jong-hoon & Choi Ha-na as adulterous couple (episode 8)
- Lee Seung-yeon as junior anchorwoman (episode 8)
- An Si-wu as presentator on the train (episode 15)
- Lee Su-han as helper of presentator on the train (episode 15)
- Lee Yong-seong as helper of presentator on the train (episode 15)
- Lee Sang-joon as pianist (episode 19)
- Lee Deok-hwa as Han Ki-young, Mo-ran's ex-fiancé (episodes 21-22)

== Ratings ==
Episode #	Original broadcast date	Average audience share			
Episode #	Original broadcast date	TNmS Ratings		AGB Nielsen	
Episode #	Original broadcast date	Nationwide	Seoul National Capital Area	Nationwide	Seoul National Capital Area
1	February 25, 2015	8.8%	10.3%	9.1%	9.4%
2	February 26, 2015	8.9%	10.4%	9.8%	10.2%
3	March 4, 2015	10.1%	13.0%	11.8%	12.2%
4	March 5, 2015	9.5%	12.8%	11.5%	12.7%
5	March 11, 2015	9.1%	11.8%	12.0%	13.1%
6	March 12, 2015	9.5%	11.9%	12.2%	13.3%
7	March 18, 2015	9.6%	12.2%	12.1%	12.4%
8	March 19, 2015	9.5%	12.5%	13.7%	14.7%
9	March 25, 2015	9.8%	11.3%	12.8%	13.9%
10	March 26, 2015	10.3%	11.7%	12.9%	13.8%
11	April 1, 2015	9.9%	12.0%	11.9%	12.1%
12	April 2, 2015	10.6%	12.3%	13.7%	15.1%
13	April 8, 2015	10.5%	11.9%	13.6%	14.0%
14	April 9, 2015	10.4%	12.4%	12.7%	13.4%
15	April 15, 2015	10.0%	11.5%	12.1%	12.3%
16	April 16, 2015	9.4%	11.5%	12.2%	12.8%
17	April 22, 2015	9.8%	10.9%	12.1%	12.7%
18	April 23, 2015	8.8%	9.8%	12.4%	13.9%
19	April 29, 2015	8.5%	9.9%	11.4%	11.8%
20	April 30, 2015	9.7%	10.9%	11.2%	11.8%
21	May 6, 2015	9.8%	11.5%	12.6%	13.6%
22	May 7, 2015	9.1%	10.4%	11.5%	11.9%
23	May 13, 2015	9.7%	11.1%	12.2%	13.4%
24	May 14, 2015	9.7%	11.6%	12.0%	12.9%
Average		9.6%	11.5%	12.1%	12.8%

== Awards and nominations ==
Year	Award	Category	Recipient	Result
2015	4th APAN Star Awards	Top Excellence Award, Actress in a Serial Drama	Chae Shi-ra	Nominated
2015	4th APAN Star Awards	Best Supporting Actress	Do Ji-won	Nominated
2015	29th KBS Drama Awards	Top Excellence Award, Actress	Chae Shi-ra	Won
2015	29th KBS Drama Awards	Top Excellence Award, Actress	Kim Hye-ja	Nominated
2015	29th KBS Drama Awards	PD Award	Kim Hye-ja	Won
2015	29th KBS Drama Awards	Excellence Award, Actor in a Mid-length Drama	Park Hyuk-kwon	Nominated
2015	29th KBS Drama Awards	Excellence Award, Actress in a Mid-length Drama	Chae Shi-ra	Nominated
2015	29th KBS Drama Awards	Excellence Award, Actress in a Mid-length Drama	Kim Hye-ja	Nominated
2015	29th KBS Drama Awards	Best Supporting Actor	Kim Ji-seok	Nominated
2015	29th KBS Drama Awards	Best Supporting Actress	Seo Yi-sook	Nominated
2015	29th KBS Drama Awards	Best Supporting Actress	Kim Hye-eun	Nominated
2015	29th KBS Drama Awards	Best Supporting Actress	Lee Mi-do	Nominated
2015	29th KBS Drama Awards	Best New Actor	Song Jae-rim	Nominated
2015	29th KBS Drama Awards	Best Young Actor	Chae Sang-Woo	Nominated
2015	29th KBS Drama Awards	Best Writer	Kim In-Young	Won
