= Kim Min Gue =

South Korean actor (born 1994)

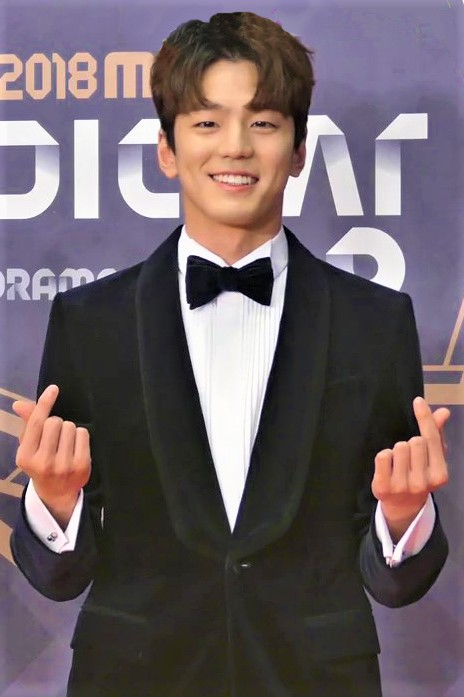
- Kim in 2018
- Born: December 25, 1994 (age 31); South Korea
- Occupation: Actor
- Years active: 2013–present
- Agent: Companion Company

Korean name
- Hangul: 김민규
- RR: Gim Mingyu
- MR: Kim Min'gyu

Kim Min Gue (Korean: 김민규; born December 25, 1994) is a South Korean actor. He is known for his appearance in the variety program Crime Scene Season 3 and gained recognition for his roles in television series Queen: Love and War (2019–20), Backstreet Rookie (2020), Snowdrop (2021–22), Business Proposal (2022), and The Heavenly Idol (2023).

== Career ==
Kim began his acting career in 2013, playing a minor role in Mnet drama Monstar, had notable roles in television series Signal (2016), Because This Is My First Life (2017), The Rich Son (2018) and Perfume (2019) and appeared in the variety program Crime Scene season 3 as an detective's assistant.

Kim gained recognition for his career's first leading role through the historical drama Queen: Love and War (2019–20) where he played Lee Kyung, the King of Joseon. In 2020, Kim played the role of Kang Ji-wook in SBS drama Backstreet Rookie.

In 2021, Kim appeared in So I Married the Anti-fan which premiered in April on Naver TV. Later the same year, he played Joo Gyeok-chan – a cold-hearted North Korean agent, in JTBC drama Snowdrop. In 2022, Kim starred in the SBS romantic comedy drama Business Proposal as chief secretary Cha Sung-hoon. Kim held an exhibition titled My Art, Your Art with graffiti artist M.Chat from June 10 to June 26, 2022.

Kim signed with Companion Company in February 2023. The same year, he stars in the tvN drama The Heavenly Idol in the title role as a K-pop idol possessed by a priest from another dimension.

== Personal life ==
=== Military service ===
On November 25, 2022, it was confirmed that Kim would be enlisting in the military ahead of the premiere of his upcoming television series, in the first half of 2023.

On March 20, 2024, Companion Company announced through Kim's fan cafe post that he will enlist to fulfill his mandatory military service as an active duty soldier on April 1. He was discharged in October 2025.

== Filmography ==
=== Film ===
| Year | Title | Role | Ref. |
|---|---|---|---|
| 2013 | The Five | | |
| 2016 | Chasing | Kim Tae-young | |
| 2018 | The Whispering | Min-woo | |
| 2019 | The Battle of Jangsari | Choi Jae-pil | |

=== Television series ===
| Year | Title | Role | Notes | Ref. |
|---|---|---|---|---|
| 2013 | Monstar | | Cameo | |
| 2015 | Who Are You? School 2015 | Swimmer | | |
| 2016 | Signal | Hwang Eui-kyung | | |
| 2016 | The Sound of Your Heart | Soldier/ Uni Student | Cameo (Episode 2, 14) | |
| 2017 | Because This Is My First Life | Yeon Bok-nam | | |
| 2017 | Meloholic | Yoo Byeong-chul | | |
| 2017 | Rain or Shine | Jin Young | | |
| 2018 | The Rich Son | Kim Myung-ha | | |
| 2018 | Let's Eat 3 | Himself | Cameo (Episode 4) | |
| 2018 | Drunk in Good Taste | Lee Yeon-nam | | |
| 2019 | Perfume | Yun Min-suk | | |
| 2019 | Queen: Love and War | Lee Kyung | | |
| 2020 | Backstreet Rookie | Kang Ji-uk | | |
| 2021 | Nevertheless | Dimples | Cameo (Episode 8) | |
| 2021–2022 | Snowdrop | Joo Gyeok-chan | | |
| 2022 | Business Proposal | Cha Sung-hoon | | |
| 2023 | The Heavenly Idol | Woo Yeon-woo / Rembrary | | |

=== Web series ===
| Year | Title | Role | Ref. |
|---|---|---|---|
| 2016 | Throbbing Virtual Love | Kim Min-gyu | |
| 2017 | Take Care of the Goddess | Park Joo-won | |
| 2017 | We are Peaceful Brothers | Lee Sang | |
| 2017 | Special Law on Romance | Jung Eui-chang | |
| 2021 | So I Married the Anti-fan | Go Soo-hwan | |

=== Television shows ===
| Year | Title | Role | Notes | Ref. |
|---|---|---|---|---|
| 2017 | Crime Scene | Cast member | Season 3; episode 1–12 | |
| 2018 | Love Me Actually | Cast member | Episode 1–20 | |

=== Music video appearances ===
| Year | Song title | Artist | Ref. |
|---|---|---|---|
| 2014 | "Promise" | Lee Ye-joon, Shin Yong-jae | |
| 2015 | "Run (Everland Ver.) | Younha | |
| 2016 | "Crazy" | Lim Jeong-hee | |

== Discography ==
=== Soundtrack appearances ===
| Title | Year | Album |
|---|---|---|
| "Drawing Paper" | 2017 | Special Law on Romance OST |
| "Answer" | 2018 | Drunk in Good Taste OST |

== Awards and nominations ==
Name of the award ceremony, year presented, category, nominee of the award, and the result of the nomination
| Award ceremony | Year | Category | Nominee / Work | Result | Ref. |
|---|---|---|---|---|---|
| Brand of the Year Awards | 2022 | Rising Star Actor | Kim Min-kyu | Won | |
| MBC Drama Awards | 2018 | Best New Actor | The Rich Son | Nominated | |
| MBC Entertainment Awards | 2019 | Rookie Award in Variety Category – Male | Love Me Actually | Nominated | |
| SBS Drama Awards | 2022 | Best Couple | Kim Min-kyu (with Seol In-ah); Business Proposal | Won | |
| SBS Drama Awards | 2022 | Excellence Award, Actor in a Miniseries Romance/Comedy Drama | Business Proposal | Won | |
