= Kim Do-yeon (actress) =

South Korean actress (born 1978)

- Born: 26 March 1978 (age 48); Busan, South Korea
- Other name: Kim Do-yun
- Education: Busan University of the Arts (Department of Theater and Film)
- Occupation: Actress
- Years active: 2000–present
- Agent: Embrace An Actor
- Known for: Hello, Me! Kill Heel; Joseon Attorney

Korean name
- Hangul: 김도연
- RR: Gim Doyeon
- MR: Kim Toyŏn

Kim Do-yeon (Korean: 김도연; born 26 March 1978) is a South Korean actress. She is known for her roles in dramas such as A Sea of Her Own, My Strange Hero, Hello, Me!, Criminal Minds, Kill Heel and Joseon Attorney.

== Filmography ==
=== Television series ===
Year	Title	Role	Ref.
2006	The Invisible Man	Audrey	
2007	Behind the White Tower	Lee Young-soon	
2008	On Air	Ahn Ji-soo	
2008	Living With a Sexy Ghost	Han Si-yun	
2009	Queen of Housewives	Ahn Jung-sook	
2009	Everybody Cha Cha Cha	Mrs. Cho	
2010	Ugly Miss Young-ae 8	Kim Do-yeon	
2010	Grudge: The Revolt of Gumiho	Eon-nyun	
2011	My Bittersweet Life	Owner Kim	
2011	Kimchi Family	Madame Soo	
2012	Ugly Miss Young-ae 10	Kim Do-yeon	
2012	Love Again	Ms. Jung	
2012	I'll Give You The Stars and The Moon	Oh Bang-sook	
2012	Hometown Over the Hill 2	Lee Do-yoon	
2012	Full House Take 2	Han Ga-ryun	
2015	In Still Green Days	Hyang-sook	
2015	Detective Alice	Mrs. Kim	
2015	My Unfortunate Boyfriend	Oh Mi-ran	
2016	My Mind's Flower Rain	Jung Ki-soon	
2017	A Sea of Her Own	Yoon Dal-ja	
2017	Criminal Minds	Yoon-ah's mother	
2018	Devilish Charm	Gong Jin-dan	
2018	My Strange Hero	Hong Jung-hye	
2019	Gracious Revenge	Prisoner	
2021	Hello, Me!	Cha Mi-ji	
2021	Taxi Driver	Choi Jong-sook	
2022	Kill Heel	Kim Soo-wan	
2022	Green Mothers' Club	Soo-in's aunt	
2022	Revenge of Others	Ahn Ji-won	
2023	Love to Hate You	Drama series director	
2023	Taxi Driver 2	Choi Jong-sook	
2023	Joseon Attorney	Chef Baek	
2023	Duty After School	Kim Deok-joong's mother	
2023	Love Tractor	Ye-chan's mother	
2023	Destined With You	Hello's mother	
2024	A Killer Paradox	Soo Mart employee	
2024	Crash	Im Ji-suk	
2024	Family by Choice	Bully's mom	

=== Film ===
Year	Title	Role	Ref.
2005	Wet Dreams 2	Tango dance team	
2005	A Bold Family	Newspaper article actress	
2006	Oh! My God	Lady	
2006	The Last Dining Table	Daughter	
2006	Dasepo Naughty Girls	member of female gang / last naive girl	
2006	Cinderella	Friend	
2006	Like a Virgin	Fat Employee	
2006	Marrying the Mafia III	Blind date woman	
2006	How the Lack of Love Affects Two Men	Miss Yang	
2006	I'm a Cyborg, But That's OK	Nurse	
2007	A Good Day to Have an Affair	Older lady	
2007	Meet Mr. Daddy	Dong-soo's wife	
2007	Someone Behind You	Kim Mi-joo	
2007	Venus and Mars	Ha-na	
2008	Forever the Moment	Jong-mi	
2008	Baby and I	Po Dong woman	
2009	More than Blue	Screenwriter	
2009	Living Death	Locked up woman	
2009	Fly Penguin	Park Mi-yeong	
2009	The Relation of Face, Mind and Love	Attendant	
2009	Fortune Salon	Seung-won's younger sister	
2010	Attack the Gas Station 2	Girl in memories	
2010	Twilight Gangsters	Supermarket worker	
2011	Drifting Away	Sook-hyun	
2011	Romantic Heaven	Person from heaven	
2011	Meet the In-laws	Yoon-sook	
2012	Love Clinique	Ms. Joon	
2013	Playboy BONG	Make up stylist	
2013	Blood and Ties	Subway woman	
2014	Scarlet Innocence	Innkeeper	
2015	Casa Amor: Exclusive for Ladies	Head of department Jo's wife	
2015	Granny's Got Talent	Granny shaman's supporter	
2015	Enemies In-Law	Park Young-sook	
2015	Wonderful Nightmare	Resident	
2022	Stellar: A Magical Ride	Kind lady	
2022	Broker	Sun-ah	
2022	2037	Kim	
