= Jung Hye-young =

South Korean actress

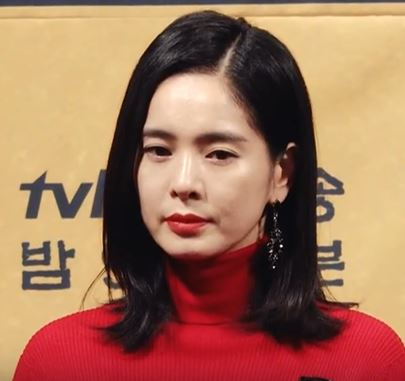
- Jung in 2019
- Born: December 14, 1973 (age 52); Muk-dong, Jungnang District, Seoul, South Korea
- Education: Seoul Institute of the Arts - Fine Arts & Creative Advertising
- Occupation: Actress
- Years active: 1993–present
- Agent: YG
- Spouse: Sean Noh (m. 2004)
- Children: 4

Korean name
- Hangul: 정혜영
- Hanja: 鄭惠英
- RR: Jeong Hyeyeong
- MR: Chŏng Hyeyŏng

Jung Hye-young (Korean: 정혜영; born December 14, 1973) is a South Korean actress. She is a part of the YG Entertainment group and is best known for her roles in Korean television dramas. She made her debut as a theater actor in 1992 and officially made her debut as a third-generation SBS talent in 1993.

== Personal life ==
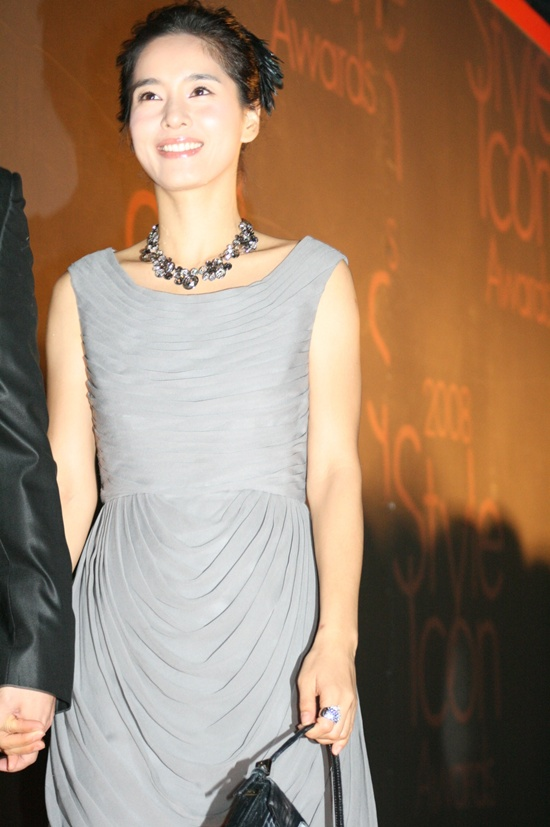
Jung in 2008

In 2004, Jung married Sean Noh, a member of hip-hop duo Jinusean. They have four children; two daughters and two sons.

== Filmography ==
=== Television series ===
Year	Title	Role	Notes/Ref.
1993	Dinosaur Teacher		
1995	Our Vines		
1995	Kka Chi		
1995	You Are So Nice		
1995	Jazz	Hong Dan-bi	
1996	The Beginning of Happiness		
1997	Starting to Happy		
1997	My Lady	adult Kim Yu-mi	
1997	Legend of Heroes	Kang Yoo-ri	
1998	Mr. Right	Na Eun-joo	
1998	For Love		
2001	The Jewelry Box in My Heart		
2002	Lovers	Jung Hye-young	
2002	To Be With You	Han Jae-hee	
2003	Swan Lake	Go Eun-jung	
2003	Sister-in-law		
2004	Phoenix	Yoon Mi-ran	
2004	Forbidden Love		cameo
2005	Lawyers	Kim Joo-hee	
2006	90 Days, Time to Love	Park Jung-ran	
2007	Prince Hours	Kang Soo-young [Hoo's mother]	cameo
2008	Spotlight	Kim Mi-hee	cameo
2008	East of Eden	Jae Hee / Janice	
2009	The Return of Iljimae	Baek Mae	
2010	Playful Kiss	Hwang Geum-hee	
2013	Gu Family Book	Chun Soo-ryun	
2018	Goodbye to Goodbye	Kim Se-young	
2019	The Crowned Clown	Woon-sim	
2021–2022	Snowdrop	Cho Seong-sim	
2022	Behind Every Star	Song Eun-ha	
2022	Reborn Rich	Lee Hae-in	
2023	Destined With You		

=== Variety shows ===
Year	Title	Role	Networks
2015–2018	The Return of Superman	Narrator	KBS
2019	Stars' Top Recipe at Fun-Staurant	Cast/chef (ep. 1-4)	KBS

=== Film ===
Year	Title	Role
2013	Man on the Edge	Dr. Choi Mi-sook
2024	Hear Me: Our Summer	Yong-jun's mother

=== Music video appearance ===
- "It's Just You" (XO, 2004)

== Bibliography ==
- Today, the More I Love You (essays, 2008)
- Happier Today (essays, 2014)

== Awards and nominations ==
Year	Award	Category	Nominated work	Result
1996	SBS Drama Awards	Best New Actress	The Beginning of Happiness	Won
2001	MBC Entertainment Awards	Best Newcomer, Sitcom category	Lovers	Won
2004	MBC Drama Awards	Excellence Award, Actress	Phoenix	Won
2005	MBC Drama Awards	Top Excellence Award, Actress	Lawyers	Nominated
2008	Style Icon Awards	"Beautiful Sharing" Special Award	—N/a	Won
2008	Korea Green Foundation	100 People Who Brightened Our World	—N/a	Won
2010	44th Taxpayer's Day	Presidential Citation	—N/a	Won
2010	1st Korea Wings of Love	Grand Prize (Daesang)	—N/a	Won
2018	MBC Drama Awards	Best Supporting Actress in Weekend Special Project	Goodbye to Goodbye	Won
