= Jo Bo-ah =

South Korean actress (born 1991)

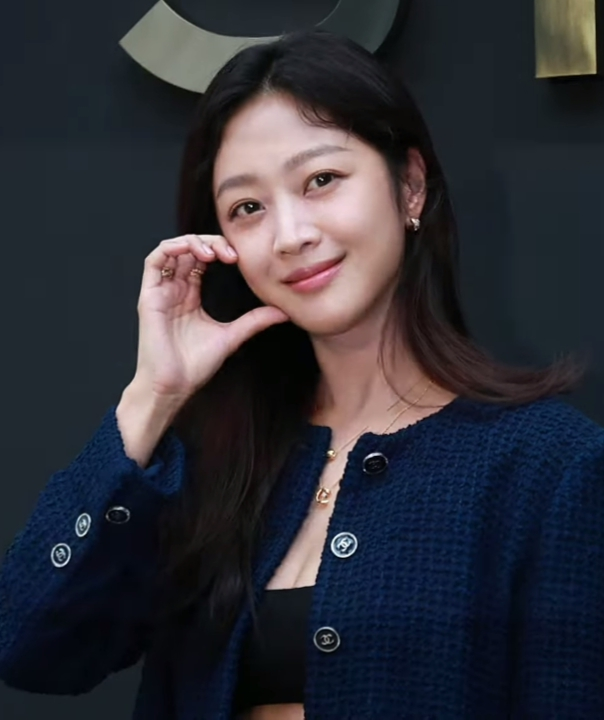
- Jo in July 2024
- Born: Jo Bo-yoon; August 22, 1991 (age 35); Seoul, South Korea
- Other name: Cho Bo-ah
- Education: Sungkyunkwan University – Performing Arts
- Occupation: Actress
- Years active: 2011–present
- Agent: Billions
- Spouse: Unknown (m. 2024)
- Children: 1

Korean name
- Hangul: 조보윤
- RR: Jo Boyun
- MR: Cho Poyun

Stage name
- Hangul: 조보아
- RR: Jo Boa
- MR: Cho Poa

Jo Bo-yoon (Korean: 조보윤; born August 22, 1991), commonly known as Jo Bo-ah (조보아), is a South Korean actress. She is known for her roles in Goodbye to Goodbye (2018), My Strange Hero (2018), Forest (2020), Tale of the Nine Tailed (2020), Military Prosecutor Doberman (2022), Destined With You (2023), and Dear Hongrang (2025).

== Early life ==
Jo Bo-ah was born Jo Bo-yoon on August 22, 1991, in Seongnae-dong, Seoul, South Korea. Jo graduated from Sungkyunkwan University majoring in Performing Arts. She has a younger sister, and is part of the Changnyeong Jo clan.

== Career ==
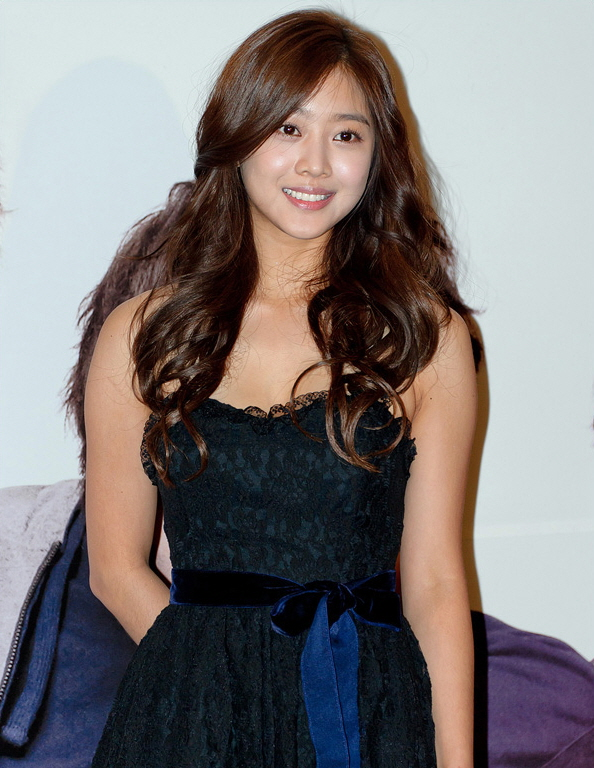
Jo at Shut Up Flower Boy Band premiere in 2012

Jo made her acting debut in 2011 with a small role in the daily sitcom I Live in Cheongdam-dong on cable channel JTBC. This was followed by a hosting gig on the audition program Made in U (also on JTBC), and an appearance in the Korean-Japanese co-production Koisuru Maison ~Rainbow Rose~. In 2012, Jo landed her first major role as a former rich girl who falls for a rocker in tvN's coming-of-age series Shut Up Flower Boy Band. Later that year, she appeared in her first network TV series with a supporting role in the MBC period drama The King's Doctor. In 2013, Jo and Kim Woo-bin hosted Mnet's weekly music show M Countdown for two weeks (on April 4 and 11). Jo was cast in her first film in 2014, as a troubled, seductive teenager who becomes obsessed with her gym teacher in the erotic thriller Innocent Thing. Back on cable television, she played the leading role in romantic comedy series The Idle Mermaid, a modern retelling of The Little Mermaid set amidst the competitive Korean workplace.

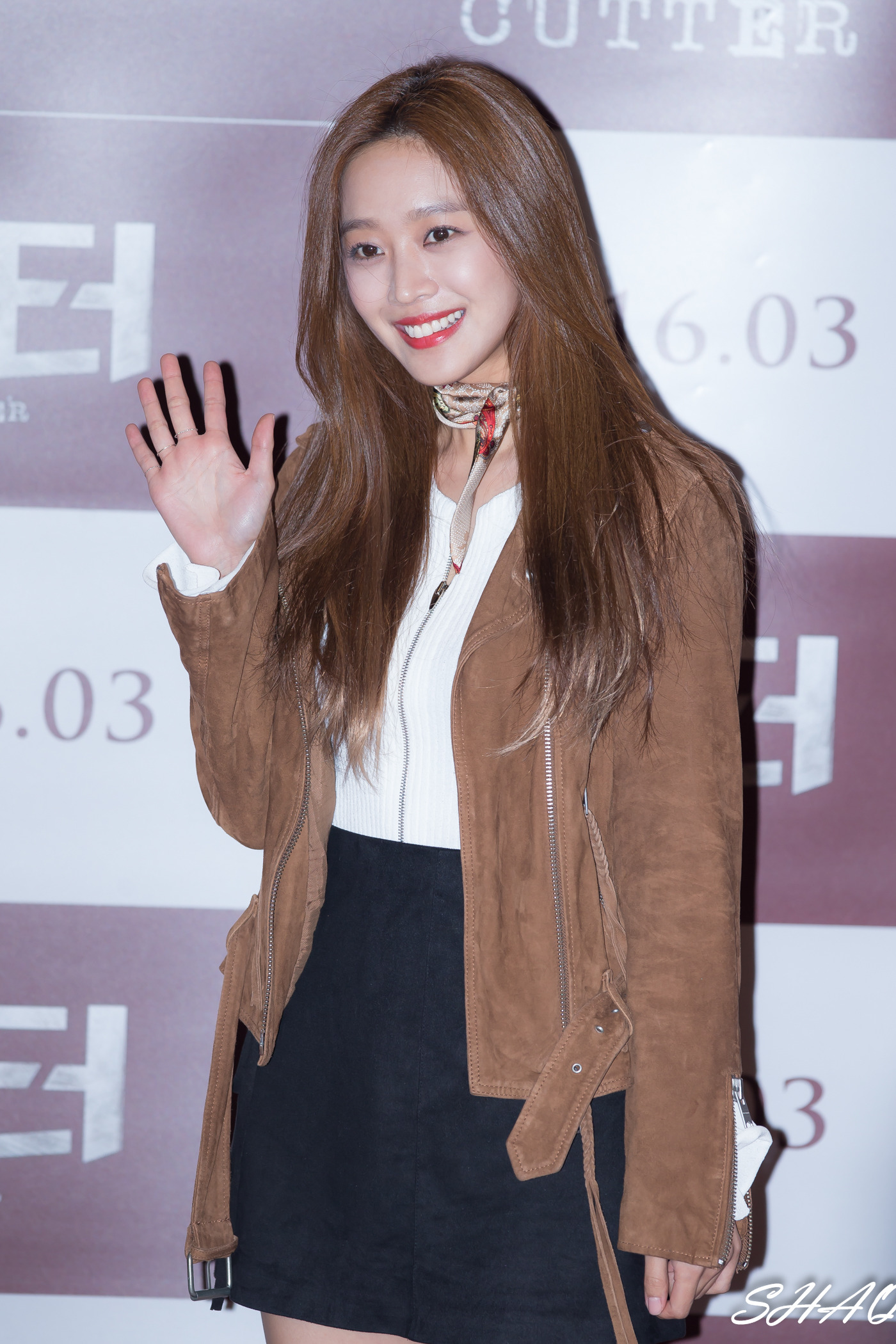
Jo at the VIP premiere of the movie Eclipse in 2016

Jo tried a new genre in 2015 with the OCN police procedural drama The Missing, where she played a detective on the missing persons task force. She then joined the ensemble cast of the KBS weekend family drama All About My Mom, and starred in web series Love Cells 2, adapted from the webtoon of the same title. In 2016, Jo starred in revenge melodrama Monster and romantic comedy series Sweet Stranger and Me. In 2017, she starred in romance melodrama Temperature of Love, and the two-episode drama special Let's Meet, Joo-oh. In 2018, Jo starred in Goodbye to Goodbye, based on a webtoon about the stories of two women. She played a university student who faces challenges as a single mother. The same year, she starred in the romantic comedy drama My Strange Hero.

In 2020, Jo starred in the romance drama Forest as a doctor. The same year, she was cast in the fantasy drama Tale of the Nine Tailed as a television producer named Nam Ji-ah. In February 2021, Jo signed with KeyEast after the expiration of her contract with the former agency. The same year, she was cast as Cha Woo-in, a military prosecutor who hides her vengeful persona, in the military-themed drama Military Prosecutor Doberman, which aired in 2022. In 2023, Jo starred in the series Destined With You as a civil servant who stumbles across a secret box that could be the key to ending a solitary lawyer's family curse. On September 20, Jo was cast in Netflix's mystery melodrama Hong Rang. On January 3, 2024, it was announced that Jo would depart from KeyEast after her contract expiry at the end of January. On February 16, Jo signed with the newly launched management agency XYZ Studio. XYZ Studio, led by Jo's longtime manager at KeyEast Kim Hyung-dae, is a subsidiary of the entertainment company Billions (then known as Blade Entertainment). In 2025, Jo starred in Netflix's mystery historical television series Dear Hongrang opposite Lee Jae-wook. It is based on Tangeum: Swallowing Gold by Jang Da-hye and was produced by Studio Dragon. In August 2024, Jo was cast opposite Kim Soo-hyun in the Disney+ series Knock-Off. In March 2025, Disney+ put the series' release on hold amid controversy surrounding Kim.

== Personal life ==
On October 12, 2024, Jo married her non-celebrity partner in a private ceremony. On February 20, 2026, she gave birth to a son.

== Filmography ==
=== Film ===
Year	Title	Role	Ref.
2014	Innocent Thing	Ha Young-eun	

=== Television series ===
Year	Title	Role	Notes	Ref.
2011	I Live in Cheongdam-dong	Bo-ah	Cameo (Episode 10, 14–15)	
2012	Flower Band	Im Soo-ah		
2012	Koisuru Maison Rainbow Rose	Bo-ah		
2012–2013	The King's Doctor	Seo Eun-seo		
2014	The Idle Mermaid	Kim Ha-ni / Aileen		
2015	The Missing	Jin Seo-joon		
2015	All About My Mom	Jang Chae-ri		
2016	Monster	Do Shin-young		
2016	Sweet Stranger and Me	Do Yeo-joo		
2017	Temperature of Love	Ji Hong-ah		
2017	KBS Drama Special – "Let Us Meet"	Lee Soo-ji		
2018	Goodbye to Goodbye	Jung-hyo		
2018–2019	My Strange Hero	Son Soo-jung		
2020	Forest	Jung Young-jae		
2020	Tale of the Nine Tailed	Nam Ji-ah / Yi Ah-eum		
2022	Military Prosecutor Doberman	Cha Woo-in		
2023	Tale of the Nine Tailed 1938	Nam Ji-ah	Cameo	
2023	Destined With You	Lee Hong-jo		
2025	The Divorce Insurance	Ki-jun's ex-wife	Cameo	
2025	Dear Hongrang	Jae-yi		
TBA	Knock-Off	Song Hye-jung		

=== Web series ===
Year	Title	Role	Ref.
2015	Love Cells 2	Ye-bom	

=== Television shows ===
Year	Title	Role	Notes	Ref.
2011–2012	Made in U	Contestant		
2017	Law of the Jungle in Sumatra	Cast member	Episode 261–264	
2017	Battle Trip	Contestant	With Kim So-eun (Episode 58–61)	
2018–2019	Baek Jong-won's Alley Restaurant	Co-host	With Baek Jong-won and Kim Sung-joo (Episode 11–59)	
2021	Korea On Stage-Namwon Gwanghallu	Host		
2024	Europe Outside the Tent	Cast Member	Season 4	

=== Web shows ===
Year	Title	Role	Ref.
2021	From the New World	Cast member	

=== Hosting ===
Year	Title	Role	Notes	Ref.
2020	2020 KBS Drama Awards	Co-host	With Do Kyung-wan , Lee Sang-yeob, and Kim Kang-hoon	
2020	2020 Trot Awards	Co-host	With Lim Young-woong and Kim Sung-joo	
2020	29th Seoul Music Awards	Co-host	With Kim Hee-chul and Shin Dong-yup	

=== Music video appearances ===
Year	Song title	Artist	Ref.
2016	"Remember That"	BtoB	
2020	"Everybody Has"	Chungha	

== Ambassadorship ==
- Public Relations Ambassador for National Election Commission General Election (2016)
- Goodwill Ambassador for Heart-Heart Foundation (2018)
- Honorary Firefighter for National Fire Agency (2020)
- Public Relations Ambassador for Korea Sale Festa (2021)
- Public Relations Ambassador for National Tax Service (2022)
- Public Relations Ambassador for National Heritage Visit Campaign (2024)

== Accolades ==
=== Awards and nominations ===
Name of the award ceremony, year presented, category, nominee of the award, and the result of the nomination
Award ceremony	Year	Category	Nominee / Work	Result	Ref.
APAN Star Awards	2018	Excellence Award, Actress in a Serial Drama	Goodbye to Goodbye	Won	
APAN Star Awards	2021	Popular Star Award, Actress	Tale of the Nine Tailed	Nominated	
Grimae Awards	2015	Best New Actress	All About My Mom	Won	
KBS Drama Awards	2015	Popularity Award, Actress	All About My Mom	Won	
KBS Drama Awards	2015	Best New Actress	All About My Mom	Nominated	
KBS Drama Awards	2016	Excellence Award, Actress in a Miniseries	Sweet Stranger and Me	Nominated	
KBS Drama Awards	2017	Best Actress in a One-Act/Special/Short Drama	Let Us Meet, Joo Oh	Nominated	
KBS Drama Awards	2020	Best Couple Award	Jo Bo-ah (with Park Hae-jin); Forest	Won	
KBS Drama Awards	2020	Netizen Award, Actress	Forest	Won	
KBS Drama Awards	2020	Excellence Award, Actress in a Miniseries	Forest	Nominated	
MBC Drama Awards	2016	Best New Actress	Monster	Won	
MBC Drama Awards	2016	Excellence Award, Actress in a Special Project Drama	Monster	Nominated	
MBC Drama Awards	2018	Excellence Award, Actress in a Weekend Drama	Goodbye to Goodbye	Won	
SBS Drama Awards	2017	Excellence Award, Actress in a Monday-Tuesday Drama	Temperature of Love	Nominated	
SBS Drama Awards	2017	Best New Actress	Temperature of Love	Nominated	
SBS Drama Awards	2019	Excellence Award, Actress in a Miniseries	My Strange Hero	Nominated	
SBS Entertainment Awards	2017	Best Challenge Award	Law of the Jungle	Won	
SBS Entertainment Awards	2018	Excellence Award in Variety Category	Baek Jong-won's Alley Restaurant	Won	
SBS Entertainment Awards	2018	Rookie Award in Female Category	Baek Jong-won's Alley Restaurant	Nominated	
The Seoul Awards	2018	Best New Actress (Drama)	Goodbye to Goodbye	Won	

=== State honors ===
Name of country or organization, year given, and name of honor
Country or organization	Year	Honor	Ref.
National Tax Service	2022	Presidential Commendation	

=== Listicles ===
Name of publisher, year listed, name of listicle, and placement
Publisher	Year	Listicle	Placement	Ref.
Forbes	2019	Korea Power Celebrity 40	29th	
