= Lawyers (TV series) =

South Korean television series

- Promotional poster
- Hangul: 변호사들
- Hanja: 辯護士들
- RR: Byeonhosadeul
- MR: Pyŏnhosadŭl
- Genre: Romance; Thriller
- Written by: Jeong Seong-joo
- Directed by: Lee Tae-gon
- Starring: Jung Hye-young; Kim Sang-kyung; Kim Sung-soo; Han Go-eun
- Composer: Choi Wan-hee (Praha)
- Country of origin: South Korea
- Original language: Korean
- No. of seasons: 1
- No. of episodes: 16

Production
- Executive producer: Kim Nam-won MBC
- Producer: Lee min-soo
- Production company: EM Media

Original release
- Network: MBC TV
- Release: July 4 – August 23, 2005

Lawyers (Korean: 변호사들; RR: Byeonhosadeul) is a 2005 South Korean television series starring Jung Hye-young, Kim Sang-kyung, Kim Sung-soo and Han Go-eun. It aired on MBC from July 4 to August 23, 2005 on Monday and Tuesday at 21:55 for 16 episodes.

== Plot ==
After the accident of Ju-hee's parents, her relationship with her boyfriend, Yoon Seok-ki, has to be ended suddenly. Ju-hee works as Seo Jeong-ho's secretary, and Seok-ki continues his studies in the US. After five years of being separated, they meet each other again in a law firm. Seok-ki begins working there, with Yang Ha-young as his secretary. It is here where the conflict between all of them begins.

== Cast ==
=== Main cast ===
- Jung Hye-young as Kim Ju-hee (law firm secretary)
- Kim Sang-kyung as Seo Jeong-ho (attorney)
- Kim Sung-soo as Alex Yoon / Yoon Seok-ki (attorney)
- Han Go-eun as Yang Ha-young (secretary)

=== Extended cast ===
- Chu Sang-mi as Song Yi Ryong (attorney)
- Lee Hwi-jae as Lee Jae Suh (attorney)
- Lee Dong-hoon as Jang Ki Soon (attorney)
- Kim Byung-ki as Koh Young Joon (law firm president)
- Im Jung-eun as Kim Se Hee
- Jerome To as Tommy
- Choi Yeo-jin as Deborah Hong
