= My Healing Love =

- Promotional poster
- Genre: Drama; Romantic comedy; Family
- Written by: Won Young-ok
- Directed by: Kim Sung-yong
- Starring: So Yoo-jin; Yeon Jung-hoon; Yoon Jong-hoon
- Music by: Kim Jang-woo
- Country of origin: South Korea
- Original language: Korean
- No. of episodes: 80

Production
- Production companies: Chorokbaem Media; Kim Jong-hak Production

Original release
- Network: MBC TV
- Release: October 14, 2018 – March 3, 2019

My Healing Love (Korean: 내사랑 치유기; RR: Naesarang chiyugi) is a 2018 South Korean television drama series, starring So Yoo-jin, Yeon Jung-hoon and Yoon Jong-hoon. It aired on MBC from 14 October 2018 to 3 March 2019 on Sunday at 20:45. It was the station's last Sunday evening drama as the time slot was abolished due to budget cuts.

== Plot ==
Im Chi-woo (So Yoo-jin) is someone who always bravely faces challenges that are thrown in her life.

== Cast ==
=== Main ===
- So Yoo-jin as Im Chi-woo / Choi Chi-yoo
- Yeon Jung-hoon as Choi Jin-yoo
- Yoon Jong-hoon as Park Wan-seung

=== Supporting ===
- Hwang Young-hee as Lee Sam-sook, Chi-woo's stepmother
- Lee Do-gyeom as Im Joo-chul
- Kwon So-hyun as Im Joo-ah
- Shorry J as Song Jae-young
- Ban Hyo-jung as Jung Hyo-sil
- Kil Yong-woo as Choi Jae-hak
- Im Kang-sung as Park Jun-seung
- Jung Ae-ri as Heo Song-joo
- Kang Da-hyun as Choi Yi-yoo
- Kim Chang-wan as Park Boo-han
- So Joo-yeon as Yang Eun-joo
- Park Joon-geum as Kim I-bok, Won-seung and Jeon-seung's mother, Chi-woo's mother-in-law

== Awards and nominations ==
Year	Award	Category	Recipient	Result
2018	MBC Drama Awards	Top Excellence Award, Actor in a Soap Opera	Yeon Jung-hoon	Won
2018	MBC Drama Awards	Top Excellence Award, Actress in a Soap Opera	So Yoo-jin	Won
2018	MBC Drama Awards	Excellence Award, Actor in a Soap Opera	Yoon Jong-hoon	Nominated
2018	MBC Drama Awards	Excellence Award, Actor in a Soap Opera	Im Kang-sung	Nominated
2018	MBC Drama Awards	Excellence Award, Actress in a Soap Opera	Park Joon-geum	Won
2018	MBC Drama Awards	Best Supporting Cast in Soap Opera	Hwang Young-hee	Nominated
