= The Rich Son =

2018 South Korean television series

- Promotional poster
- Hangul: 부잣집 아들
- Lit.: Rich Family's Son
- RR: Bujatjip adeul
- MR: Pujatchip adŭl
- Genre: Family; Melodrama
- Written by: Kim Jung-Soo
- Directed by: Choi Chang-Wook
- Starring: Kim Ji-hoon; Kim Ju-hyeon; Lee Kyu-han; Hong Soo-hyun
- Country of origin: South Korea
- Original language: Korean
- No. of episodes: 85 (Note: In order to circumvent Korean laws that prevent commercial breaks in the middle of an episode, what would previously have been aired as single 70 minute episodes are now being repackaged as two 35 minute episodes, with two episodes being shown each night with a commercial break between the two.)

Production
- Executive producer: Lee Kwan-hee
- Camera setup: Single-camera
- Running time: 35 minutes
- Production company: Lee Kwan-hee Production

Original release
- Network: MBC TV
- Release: March 25 – October 7, 2018

The Rich Son (Korean: 부잣집 아들; RR: Bujatjip adeul) is a South Korean television series starring Kim Ji-hoon, Kim Ju-hyeon, Lee Kyu-han, and Hong Soo-hyun. The series aired 4 episodes every Sunday from March 25 to October 7, 2018 from 8:50 p.m. to 11:20 p.m. (KST) on MBC TV.

== Cast ==
=== Main ===
- Kim Ji-hoon as Lee Kwang-jae
- Kim Ju-hyeon as Kim Young-ha
- Lee Kyu-han as Nam Tae-il
- Hong Soo-hyun as Kim Kyung-ha

=== Supporting ===
- Lee Seung-yeon as Nam Soo-hee
- Kim Young-ok as Park Soon-ok
- Yoon Yoo-sun as Park Hyun-sook
- Park Soon-chun as Seo Bok-soon
- Jeong Bo-seok as Kim Won-yong
- Kang Nam-gil as Lee Kye-dong
- Woo Hyun as Choi Hyo-dong
- Yoon Chul-hyung as Nam Soo-hwan
- Cha Seo-won as Choi Yong
- Jeon Soo-kyeong as Na Young-ae
- Oh Yoon-hong as Chairman Nam's wife
- Park Jae-jung as Kim Jong-yong
- Shim Eun-jin as Seo Myung-sun
- Kim Min-kyu as Kim Myung-ha
- Elkie Chong as Wang Mong-mong
- Yang Hye-ji as Park Seo-hee

=== Cameos ===
- Lee Yong-jin (ep. 7)

== Ratings ==
- In the table below, the blue numbers represent the lowest ratings and the red numbers represent the highest ratings.
- NR denotes that the drama did not rank in the top 20 daily programs on that date.
- N/A denotes that the rating is not known.
- TNmS stop publishing their report from June 2018.

Ep.	Original broadcast date	Average audience share			
Ep.	Original broadcast date	TNmS Ratings		AGB Nielsen	
Ep.	Original broadcast date	Nationwide	Seoul National Capital Area	Nationwide	Seoul National Capital Area
1	March 25, 2018	4.9% (NR)	4.8%	5.1% (NR)	5.0% (NR)
2	March 25, 2018	12.6% (4th)	12.4%	12.0% (4th)	11.8% (5th)
3	March 25, 2018	9.8% (10th)	9.7%	9.5% (12th)	9.4% (12th)
4	March 25, 2018	10.2% (9th)	9.9%	10.5% (7th)	10.2% (8th)
5	April 1, 2018	4.4% (NR)	4.2%	4.3% (NR)	4.5% (NR)
6	April 1, 2018	11.6% (5th)	11.3%	11.2% (4th)	11.4% (5th)
7	April 1, 2018	8.9% (12th)	8.3%	9.9% (10th)	10.4% (9th)
8	April 1, 2018	9.3% (10th)	8.6%	10.5% (8th)	11.4% (5th)
9	April 8, 2018	2.8% (NR)	2.5%	3.1% (NR)	3.3% (NR)
10	April 8, 2018	11.2% (6th)	11.1%	10.5% (7th)	10.6% (7th)
11	April 8, 2018	9.4% (10th)	9.3%	9.1% (13th)	9.0% (14th)
12	April 8, 2018	9.2% (11th)	9.0%	9.5% (11th)	9.3% (13th)
13	April 15, 2018	3.7% (NR)	3.6%	3.9% (NR)	3.8% (NR)
14	April 15, 2018	10.2% (4th)	10.0%	10.1% (5th)	9.9% (5th)
15	April 15, 2018	9.1% (9th)	8.9%	9.0% (10th)	8.8% (11th)
16	April 15, 2018	9.5% (7th)	9.3%	9.9% (6th)	9.7% (6th)
17	April 22, 2018	5.2% (NR)	5.1%	4.0% (NR)	3.9% (NR)
18	April 22, 2018	10.7% (7th)	10.6%	10.1% (9th)	10.0% (10th)
19	April 22, 2018	8.9% (11th)	8.8%	8.7% (12th)	8.7% (11th)
20	April 22, 2018	8.7% (12th)	8.5%	8.6% (13th)	8.4% (12th)
21	April 29, 2018	6.0% (NR)	5.8%	5.7% (NR)	5.5% (NR)
22	April 29, 2018	8.7% (10th)	8.0%	8.1% (11th)	7.5% (11th)
23	April 29, 2018	7.4% (15th)	7.2%	7.3% (13th)	7.1% (13th)
24	April 29, 2018	8.2% (12th)	7.7%	7.9% (12th)	7.4% (12th)
25	May 6, 2018	3.7% (NR)	3.5%	3.4% (NR)	3.2% (NR)
26	May 6, 2018	8.8% (10th)	8.4%	7.9% (10th)	7.6% (9th)
27	May 6, 2018	8.4% (12th)	8.0%	7.1% (13th)	6.8% (13th)
28	May 6, 2018	8.2% (13th)	7.8%	7.6% (11th)	7.4% (11th)
29	May 13, 2018	3.8% (NR)	3.6%	3.1% (NR)	2.9% (NR)
30	May 13, 2018	10.4% (6th)	10.1%	9.4% (9th)	9.2% (8th)
31	May 13, 2018	9.7% (10th)	9.6%	8.8% (12th)	8.7% (12th)
32	May 13, 2018	10.0% (8th)	9.9%	9.2% (10th)	9.2% (8th)
33	May 20, 2018	3.3% (NR)	3.1%	2.6% (NR)	2.4% (NR)
34	May 20, 2018	9.8% (7th)	9.3%	8.4% (12th)	8.0% (13th)
35	May 20, 2018	9.0% (12th)	8.8%	8.7% (9th)	8.5% (10th)
36	May 20, 2018	9.4% (11th)	9.1%	8.5% (11th)	8.2% (12th)
37	May 27, 2018	6.4% (16th)	6.2%	6.3% (17th)	6.3% (18th)
38	May 27, 2018	8.7% (6th)	8.6%	8.5% (10th)	8.4% (8th)
39	May 27, 2018	8.8% (5th)	8.7%	8.3% (11th)	8.2% (11th)
40	May 27, 2018	7.6% (12th)	7.5%	9.2% (8th)	9.1% (6th)
41	June 3, 2018	4.4%	4.1%	4.2% (NR)	4.0% (NR)
42	June 3, 2018	10.7%	10.2%	9.1% (13th)	8.5% (12th)
43	June 3, 2018	10.6%	10.1%	9.2% (9th)	8.8% (11th)
44	June 3, 2018	10.5%	9.9%	9.5% (7th)	9.0% (9th)
45	June 10, 2018	5.6%	5.3%	5.4% (NR)	(N/A)
46	June 10, 2018	10.0%	9.9%	10.1% (8th)	10.0% (9th)
47	June 10, 2018	9.8%	9.4%	10.0% (9th)	9.6% (11th)
48	June 10, 2018	9.8%	9.6%	10.3% (7th)	10.5% (6th)
49	June 17, 2018	3.1%	2.8%	2.9% (NR)	2.7% (NR)
50	June 17, 2018	10.0%	9.5%	9.8% (6th)	9.3% (7th)
51	June 17, 2018	10.2%	9.7%	9.0% (9th)	8.5% (11th)
52	June 17, 2018	11.2%	10.8%	9.9% (5th)	9.4% (5th)
53	July 1, 2018	8.8%	8.6%	8.3% (13th)	8.1% (15th)
54	July 1, 2018	10.3%	10.0%	9.7% (10th)	9.4% (12th)
55	July 8, 2018	3.6%	3.3%	3.2% (NR)	2.9% (NR)
56	July 8, 2018	10.1%	9.6%	10.0% (7th)	9.5% (7th)
57	July 8, 2018	9.9%	8.4%	8.5% (12th)	8.0% (13th)
58	July 8, 2018	10.5%	10.1%	9.6% (8th)	9.2% (9th)
59	July 15, 2018	3.2%	3.0%	2.8% (NR)	2.6% (NR)
60	July 15, 2018	9.0%	8.3%	8.7% (11th)	8.0% (13th)
61	July 15, 2018	8.8%	7.9%	8.0% (14th)	7.2% (15th)
62	July 15, 2018	10.2%	9.5%	9.5% (8th)	8.8% (12th)
63	July 22, 2018	3.4%	3.3%	3.1% (NR)	2.9% (NR)
64	July 22, 2018	9.9%	9.4%	9.1% (11th)	8.7% (11th)
65	July 22, 2018	9.3%	9.0%	8.8% (12th)	8.5% (12th)
66	July 22, 2018	10.1%	9.8%	9.7% (8th)	9.4% (10th)
67	July 29, 2018	3.8%	3.5%	3.4% (NR)	3.1% (NR)
68	July 29, 2018	10.3%	10.0%	9.5% (9th)	9.2% (11th)
69	July 29, 2018	9.7%	9.6%	9.1% (10th)	9.1% (12th)
70	July 29, 2018	10.5%	10.4%	10.3% (6th)	10.3% (7th)
71	August 5, 2018	3.6%	3.1%	3.2% (NR)	2.8% (NR)
72	August 5, 2018	9.4%	8.8%	8.6% (9th)	8.0% (12th)
73	August 5, 2018	9.3%	8.7%	8.5% (11th)	7.9% (13th)
74	August 5, 2018	9.3%	8.6%	9.2% (8th)	8.5% (10th)
75	August 12, 2018	1.9%	1.4%	2.3% (NR)	1.8% (NR)
76	August 12, 2018	9.3%	8.7%	9.8% (8th)	9.3% (9th)
77	August 12, 2018	8.8%	8.2%	9.4% (10th)	8.9% (11th)
78	August 12, 2018	9.7%	9.3%	10.4% (6th)	10.1% (7th)
79	August 26, 2018	9.1%	9.0%	9.5% (5th)	9.6% (5th)
80	August 26, 2018	10.3%	9.9%	10.8% (3rd)	10.4% (4th)
81	September 9, 2018	—N/a	—N/a	2.8% (NR)	—N/a
82	September 9, 2018	10.5%	—N/a	9.1% (9th)	8.2% (12th)
83	September 9, 2018	9.4%	—N/a	8.8% (11th)	8.0% (13th)
84	September 9, 2018	10.3%	—N/a	10.0% (7th)	9.2% (7th)
85	September 16, 2018		—N/a	5.1% (NR)	—N/a
86	September 16, 2018		—N/a	8.8% (11th)	7.7% (16th)
87	September 16, 2018		—N/a	8.6% (13th)	7.6% (17th)
88	September 16, 2018		—N/a	9.9% (9th)	8.9% (11th)
89	September 23, 2018		—N/a	4.4% (NR)	—N/a
90	September 23, 2018		—N/a	9.0% (8th)	
91	September 23, 2018		—N/a	8.6% (9th)	
92	September 23, 2018		—N/a	9.1% (7th)	
93	September 30, 2018		—N/a		
94	September 30, 2018		—N/a		
95	September 30, 2018		—N/a		
96	September 30, 2018		—N/a		
97	October 7, 2018		—N/a		
98	October 7, 2018		—N/a		
99	October 7, 2018		—N/a		
100	October 7, 2018		—N/a		
Average		%	%	%	%

- Each night's broadcast is divided into four 35 minute episodes with three commercial breaks in between.
- Episodes 53-56 did not air on June 24 due to the coverage of a FIFA World Cup 2018 Group G match between England and Panama.
- Only 2 episodes aired on July 1 due to the coverage of the FIFA World Cup 2018 Round of 16 match between Spain and Russia.
- Episodes did not air on August 19 due to the coverage of the 2018 Asian Games and broadcast of the movie 'The Big Swindle'.
- Only 2 episodes aired on August 26 due to the coverage of the 2018 Asian Games.
- No episodes aired on September 2 due to the coverage of the 2018 Asian Games.

== Awards and nominations ==
Year	Award	Category	Recipient	Result	Ref.
2018	6th APAN Star Awards	Excellence Award, Actor in a Serial Drama	Kim Ji-hoon	Nominated	
2018	2018 MBC Drama Awards	Top Excellence Award, Actor in a Soap Opera	Kim Ji-hoon	Nominated	
2018	2018 MBC Drama Awards	Top Excellence Award, Actor in a Soap Opera	Jeong Bo-seok	Nominated	
2018	2018 MBC Drama Awards	Top Excellence Award, Actress in a Soap Opera	Kim Ju-hyeon	Nominated	
2018	2018 MBC Drama Awards	Top Excellence Award, Actress in a Soap Opera	Hong Soo-hyun	Nominated	
2018	2018 MBC Drama Awards	Excellence Award, Actor in a Serial Drama	Lee Kyu-han	Won	
2018	2018 MBC Drama Awards	Excellence Award, Actress in a Soap Opera	Yoon Yoo-sun	Nominated	
2018	2018 MBC Drama Awards	Best Supporting Cast in Soap Opera	Kang Nam-gil	Nominated	
2018	2018 MBC Drama Awards	Best Supporting Cast in Soap Opera	Lee Seung-yeon	Nominated	
2018	2018 MBC Drama Awards	Best New Actor	Kim Min-kyu	Nominated	
