= Park Kyung-hye =

South Korean television and film actress (born 1993)

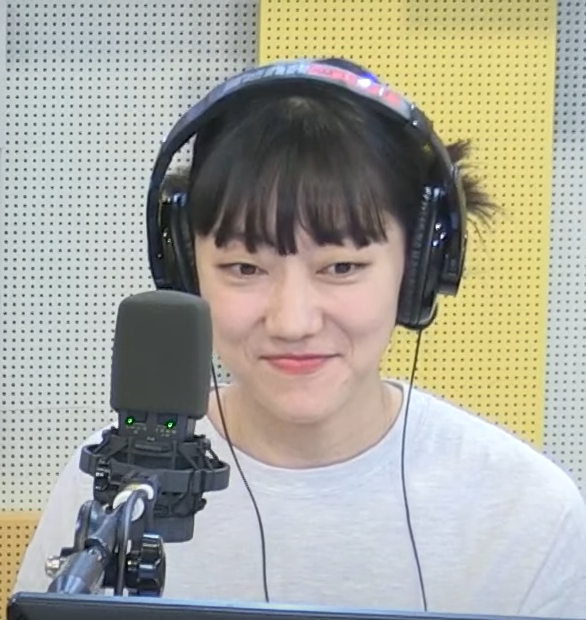
- Park in 2022
- Born: January 5, 1993 (age 33); Seoul, South Korea
- Occupation: Actress
- Years active: 2011–present
- Agent: Beyond J

Korean name
- Hangul: 박경혜
- RR: Bak Gyeonghye
- MR: Pak Kyŏnghye

Park Kyung-hye (Korean: 박경혜; born on 5 January 1993) is a South Korean actress. She made her acting debut in 2011 in films, since then, she has appeared in number of films and television series. She got recognition for her supporting roles in Guardian: The Lonely and Great God (2016), Touch Your Heart, Miss Lee (2019) and My Roommate Is a Gumiho (2021). She has acted in films such as: The Dude in Me (2019), Escape from Mogadishu (2021), and Limit (2022) among others.

== Career ==
Park Kyung-hye is affiliated to artist management company Big Boss Entertainment. Park made her debut in film Ad Balloon in 2011, then she appeared in small roles in films. Her break through came in TV series in 2014. She appeared in Cunning Single Lady (2014), Guardian: The Lonely and Great God (2016), Heart Surgeons (2018) and Touch Your Heart (2019).

In July 2022, Park signed with C-JeS Entertainment. In May 2025, she signed with Beyond J.

== Filmography ==
=== Film ===
Year	Title	Role	Notes	Ref.
2011	Ad Balloon			
2013	Hwayi: A Monster Boy	Paju Farming Association female employee		
2013	Koala			
2014	Big Match	Elf		
2015	Salut d'Amour	Iljin, school gang, Sogareumri		
2017	Fabricated City	Call center employee		
2017	Jane	Na-gyeong		
2017	1987: When the Day Comes	Jeong-mi		
2018	The Drug King	Lee Kyung-ja		
2019	The Dude in Me	Jae-hee		
2019	Bring Me Home	New nurse		
2021	Escape from Mogadishu	Park Ji-eun		
2022	Limit	Myeong-seon		
2022	Reverse		Audio film	
2023	Smugglers	Dok-soon		
2023	Dr. Cheon and Lost Talisman	Sa-wol		
2024	Handsome Guys	Sun-ok		

=== Television series ===
Year	Title	Role	Notes	Ref.
2014	Cunning Single Lady			
2014	Drama Special: "You're Pretty, Oh Man-bok"		Season 5, Epi. 4	
2014	Diary of a Night Watchman			
2016	That Sun in the Sky	Go Sung-ran		
2016	The Sound of Your Heart	Ae-bong's friend 1		
2016	Drama Special: "Disqualify Laughter"		Season 7, Epi. 8	
2016	Guardian: The Lonely and Great God	Virgin Ghost		
2017	Distorted	Seo Na-rae		
2017–18	Jugglers	Goo Kye-young		
2018	Heart Surgeons	Lee Seon-young		
2018	Clean with Passion for Now		Special appearance	
2018	My Strange Hero	Jang Ji-hyun		
2019	Touch Your Heart	Dan Moon-hee		
2019	My Fellow Citizens!	Yang Mi-jin		
2019	Miss Lee	Kim Ha-na		
2021	My Roommate Is a Gumiho	Choi Soo-kyung		
2022	Love in Contract	Kim Yu-mi		
2023	My Lovely Liar	Cassandra		
2023	Destined With You	Son Sae-byeol		
