= Goodbye to Goodbye =

2018 South Korean television series

- Promotional poster
- Hangul: 이별이 떠났다
- Lit.: Parting Left
- RR: Ibyeori tteonatda
- MR: Ibyŏri ttŏnatta
- Genre: Romance; Melodrama
- Based on: Parting Left by So Jae-won and Sal Goo
- Developed by: Kim Sung-mo (MBC)
- Written by: So Jae-won
- Directed by: Kim Min-sik
- Starring: Chae Shi-ra; Jo Bo-ah; Lee Sung-jae; Lee Jun-young
- Composer: Park Se-joon
- Country of origin: South Korea
- Original language: Korean
- No. of episodes: 40 (Note: In order to circumvent Korean laws that prevent commercial breaks in the middle of an episode, what would previously have been aired as single 70 minute episodes are now being repackaged as two 35 minute episodes, with two episodes being shown each night with a commercial break between the two.)

Production
- Executive producers: Chae Young-woong; Kim Chang-suk; Shin In-soo; Yoo Hong-gu
- Running time: 35 minutes
- Production companies: PF Entertainment; Super Moon Pictures

Original release
- Network: MBC TV
- Release: May 26 – August 4, 2018

Goodbye to Goodbye (Korean: 이별이 떠났다; RR: Ibyeori tteonatda) is a 2018 South Korean television series starring Chae Shi-ra, Jo Bo-ah, Lee Sung-jae, and Lee Jun-young. It is based on the web novel of the same name written by So Jae-won and illustrated by Sal Goo, which was first published in 2017 by Naver. The series aired every Saturday from May 2018 on MBC TV from 8:45 p.m. to 11:10 p.m. (KST) with 4 episodes a day.

== Synopsis ==
This series is about two women who came to live together following the betrayals of their partners.

== Cast ==
=== Main ===
- Chae Shi-ra as Seo Young-hee

A woman who separated from her husband after his affair. She is Han Min Soo's mother.

- Jo Bo-ah as Jung Hyo

A woman whose boyfriend wants her to have an abortion, and chooses to stay at her boyfriend's mother's house.

- Lee Sung-jae as Han Sang-jin

Young-hee's husband who is a pilot.

- Lee Jun-young as Han Min-soo

Young-hee's son and Jung Hyo's boyfriend.

=== Supporting ===
- Jung Hye-young as Kim Se-young
- Jung Woong-in as Jung Soo-chul, Jung Hyo's father
- Yang Hee-kyung as Kim Ok-ja, Kim Se-young's mother
- Kim San-ho as Moon Jong-won, Han Sang-jin's workplace junior
- Ha Si-eun as Han Hee-jin, Han Sang-jin's sister
- Oh Ha-nee as Lee Ah-in, Jung Hyo's friend
- Yoo Su-bin as Woo Nam-sik, Min-soo's friend
- Joel Roberts as Bikilla
- Shin Bi as Han Yoo-yeon

== Production ==
- Jung Joon-ho was originally cast in the leading role of Han Sang-jin, but left the drama prior to filming due to schedule clashes.
- The first script reading took place March 30, 2018 at MBC Broadcasting Station in Sangam, South Korea.

== Ratings ==
- In the table below, the blue numbers represent the lowest ratings and the red numbers represent the highest ratings.
- NR denotes that the drama did not rank in the top 20 daily programs on that date.
- TNmS stop publishing their report from June 2018.

Ep.	Original broadcast date	Average audience share			
Ep.	Original broadcast date	TNmS		AGB Nielsen	
Ep.	Original broadcast date	Nationwide	Seoul	Nationwide	Seoul
1	May 26, 2018	5.9% (18th)	6.0%	5.6% (19th)	5.7% (19th)
2	May 26, 2018	7.5% (8th)	7.6%	7.4% (6th)	8.0% (4th)
3	May 26, 2018	7.1% (10th)	7.5%	7.0% (8th)	7.4% (6th)
4	May 26, 2018	6.9% (13th)	7.4%	7.5% (5th)	7.5% (5th)
5	June 2, 2018	3.6%	3.7%	3.4% (NR)	3.5% (NR)
6	June 2, 2018	9.1%	9.9%	8.2% (6th)	9.0% (4th)
7	June 2, 2018	7.5%	8.1%	8.0% (7th)	8.6% (6th)
8	June 2, 2018	8.2%	9.4%	9.0% (3rd)	10.2% (3rd)
9	June 9, 2018	4.4%	4.5%	4.2% (NR)	4.3% (NR)
10	June 9, 2018	9.9%	10.7%	10.0% (4th)	10.8% (3rd)
11	June 9, 2018	8.9%	10.0%	9.8% (5th)	10.7% (4th)
12	June 9, 2018	9.6%	10.5%	10.3% (3rd)	11.3% (2nd)
13	June 23, 2018	5.9%	6.1%	5.5% (NR)	5.7% (NR)
14	June 23, 2018	8.0%	8.8%	8.5% (8th)	9.3% (7th)
15	June 23, 2018	6.9%	7.3%	7.4% (13th)	7.8% (12th)
16	June 23, 2018	7.7%	8.1%	8.2% (11th)	8.5% (9th)
17	June 30, 2018	4.5%	4.7%	4.9% (NR)	5.1% (NR)
18	June 30, 2018	10.0%	10.2%	10.0% (5th)	10.3% (5th)
19	June 30, 2018	8.8%	9.6%	9.5% (6th)	10.3% (5th)
20	June 30, 2018	9.2%	10.4%	10.6% (4th)	11.8% (4th)
21	July 7, 2018	2.6%	2.8%	3.0% (NR)	3.2% (NR)
22	July 7, 2018	7.8%	8.3%	8.2% (6th)	8.7% (5th)
23	July 7, 2018	6.7%	7.0%	7.2% (13th)	7.5% (11th)
24	July 7, 2018	9.5%	9.8%	9.9% (4th)	10.2% (4th)
25	July 14, 2018	3.8%	3.9%	4.2% (NR)	4.3% (NR)
26	July 14, 2018	8.6%	8.7%	8.4% (6th)	8.5% (6th)
27	July 14, 2018	8.1%	8.3%	8.2% (7th)	8.4% (7th)
28	July 14, 2018	8.9%	9.4%	9.5% (3rd)	10.0% (2nd)
29	July 21, 2018	3.2%	3.3%	3.6% (NR)	3.8% (NR)
30	July 21, 2018	7.7%	8.2%	8.1% (7th)	8.6% (5th)
31	July 21, 2018	7.4%	7.8%	8.5% (4th)	8.9% (3rd)
32	July 21, 2018	8.8%	9.5%	9.4% (2nd)	10.1% (2nd)
33	July 28, 2018	3.0%	3.1%	3.4% (NR)	3.5% (NR)
34	July 28, 2018	7.8%	8.2%	8.3% (7th)	8.8% (7th)
35	July 28, 2018	7.3%	7.7%	7.5% (12th)	7.9% (9th)
36	July 28, 2018	8.0%	8.6%	8.5% (5th)	9.1% (5th)
37	August 4, 2018	2.3%	2.4%	2.7% (NR)	2.8% (NR)
38	August 4, 2018	7.2%	7.8%	7.6% (11th)	7.9% (10th)
39	August 4, 2018	7.0%	7.5%	7.9% (9th)	8.4% (6th)
40	August 4, 2018	8.5%	9.2%	9.8% (2nd)	10.5% (2nd)
Average		7.4%	7.8%	7.5%	8.4%

- Episodes 13-16 did not air on June 16 due to the coverage of the 2018 FIFA World Cup tournament.

== Awards and nominations ==
Name of the award ceremony, year presented, category, nominee of the award, and the result of the nomination
Award ceremony	Year	Category	Nominee / Work	Result	Ref.
APAN Star Awards	2018	Top Excellence Award, Actor in a Serial Drama	Lee Sung-jae	Nominated	
APAN Star Awards	2018	Top Excellence Award, Actor in a Serial Drama	Jung Woong-in	Nominated	
APAN Star Awards	2018	Top Excellence Award, Actress in a Serial Drama	Chae Shi-ra	Nominated	
APAN Star Awards	2018	Excellence Award, Actress in a Serial Drama	Jo Bo-ah	Won	
The Seoul Awards	2018	Best New Actress	Jo Bo-ah	Won	
Korea Cultural Entertainment Awards	2018	Best New Actor	Lee Jun-young	Won	
MBC Drama Awards	2018	Grand Prize (Daesang)	Chae Shi-ra	Nominated	
MBC Drama Awards	2018	Top Excellence Award, Actress in a Weekend Drama	Chae Shi-ra	Won	
MBC Drama Awards	2018	Top Excellence Award, Actor in a Weekend Special Project	Lee Sung-jae	Nominated	
MBC Drama Awards	2018	Excellence Award, Actor in a Weekend Special Project	Jung Woong-in	Nominated	
MBC Drama Awards	2018	Excellence Award, Actress in a Weekend Drama	Jo Bo-ah	Won	
MBC Drama Awards	2018	Best Supporting Actress in a Weekend Drama	Jung Hye-young	Won	
MBC Drama Awards	2018	Best New Actor	Lee Jun-young	Won	
MBC Drama Awards	2018	Best Child Actress	Shin Bi	Won	
