= Kim Joo-hyun (actress) =

South Korean actress (born 1987)

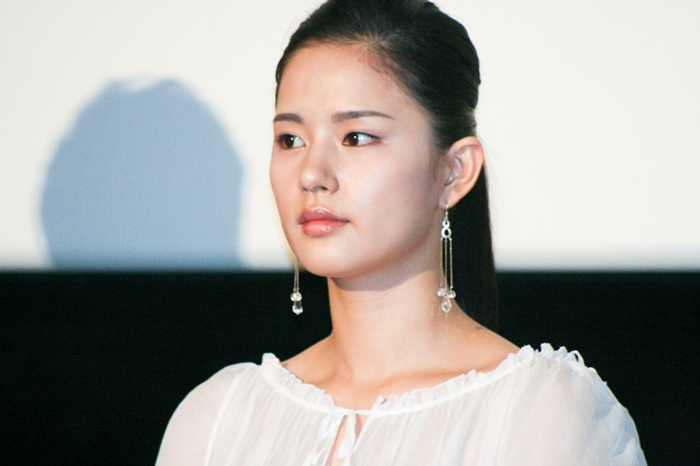
- Kim in 2007
- Born: March 10, 1987 (age 39); Gyeonggi Province, South Korea
- Other name: Kim Ju-hyun
- Education: Dongguk University - Theater and Film
- Occupation: Actress
- Years active: 2007–present
- Agent: BH Entertainment (2020–present)

Korean name
- Hangul: 김주현
- RR: Gim Juhyeon
- MR: Kim Chuhyŏn

Kim Joo-hyun (Korean: 김주현, born March 10, 1987) is a South Korean actress. Kim debuted in the film Epitaph in 2007. She is known for resembling Han Ga-in.

== Filmography ==
=== Film ===
Year	Title	Role
2007	Epitaph	Aoi
2008	Life Is Cool	High school girl 1
2016	Pandora	Yeon-joo

=== Television series ===
Year	Title	Role	Network	Ref.
2012	Love, My Love	Shim Yun-hong	KBS2	
2013	Drama Festival: "Swine Escape"	Boo-yong	MBC TV	
2014	Modern Farmer	Song Hwa-ran	SBS TV	
2017	Unni Is Alive	Kang Ha-ri	SBS TV	
2018	The Rich Son	Kim Young-ha	MBC TV	
2020	Delayed Justice	Lee Yoo-kyung	SBS TV	
