= Undercover (2021 TV series) =

2021 South Korean television series

- Promotional poster
- Hangul: 언더커버
- RR: Eondeokeobeo
- MR: Ŏndŏk'ŏbŏ
- Genre: Political thriller Action; Drama
- Created by: JTBC
- Based on: Undercover by Peter Moffat and James Hawes
- Written by: Baek Cheol-hyeon; Jung Hye-eun; Song Ja-hoon
- Directed by: Song Hyun-wook
- Starring: Ji Jin-hee; Kim Hyun-joo; Jung Man-sik; Huh Joon-ho
- Composer: Eom Ki-yeop
- Country of origin: South Korea
- Original language: Korean
- No. of episodes: 16

Production
- Executive producer: Lim Byung-hoon
- Producers: Kim Ye-ji; Park Woo-ram; Lee Hyeong-hoon; Kim Jae-geum
- Editor: Irene
- Running time: 70 minutes
- Production companies: Story TV; JTBC Studios

Original release
- Network: JTBC
- Release: April 23 – June 12, 2021

Related
- Undercover (UK)

Undercover (Korean: 언더커버) is a 2021 South Korean television series directed by Song Hyun-wook and starring Ji Jin-hee, Kim Hyun-joo, Jung Man-sik, and Huh Joon-ho. Based on BBC drama series of the same name, it portrays the story of Han Jeong-hyeon (Ji Jin-hee), an agent at the National Intelligence Service, and a Human Rights lawyer, Choi Yeon-soo (Kim Hyun-joo). It aired on JTBC on Fridays and Saturdays at 23:00 (KST) from April 23 to June 12, 2021. The series is also available on streaming media TVING in South Korea. Kim Hyun-joo and Ji Jin-hee previously starred together in Miss Kim's Million Dollar Quest (2004) and I Have a Lover (2015).

The series ended on June 12, 2021 with viewer ratings of 5.2% nationwide and 6.1% in the metropolitan Seoul area. It is its own best ratings achieved during its run.

== Synopsis ==
Han Jeong-hyeon (Ji Jin-hee) is an agent of the National Intelligence Service (formerly the Agency for National Security Planning), who has been hiding his identity for the past 30 years as a father and owner of a bicycle repairing shop. Choi Yeon-soo (Kim Hyun-joo), his wife and a Human Rights lawyer, becomes the first Director of the Corruption Investigation Office (CIO). These characters are trying to uncover the truth, pitted against a huge force holding a top position. The series tests their relationship as husband and wife when the secret life of Jeong-hyeon comes to light.

== Cast ==
=== Main ===
- Ji Jin-hee as Han Jeong-hyeon/Lee Suk-kyu
  - Yeon Woo-jin as young Han Jeong-hyeon/Lee Suk-kyu

Lee Seok-kyu is agent at the National Intelligence Service, formerly the Agency for National Security Planning. He was selected as the new agent of NIS when he was in a police academy. At first he was tasked to spy on Choi Yeon-soo under the pseudonym Han Jung-hyun in order to take down Kim Tae-yeol who was targeted by NIS, eventually both of them were in mutual love and got married. Years later, he lives a peaceful life with his family until one day an NIS agent named Do Yeong-geol comes back to his life and he is enlisted to take down his own wife, Choi Yeon-soo.

- Kim Hyun-joo as Choi Yeon-soo
  - Han Sun-hwa as young Choi Yeon-soo

A human right lawyer for more than 20 years. She passed her bar test at the age of 20. A righteous person, she consistently seeks justice for years to Hwang Jung-ho for 20 years after he was unjustly jailed. She joined a mass protest with Kim Tae-yeol, Kang Choong-mo and others to protest against the corrupted South Korean government who failed in protecting Hwang Jung-ho's innocence. In one of a chaotic protest against the government, she met Lee Suk-kyu, under the pseudonym Han Jung-hyun. Both of them ended in mutual love, without her knowing who Suk-kyu was, therefore getting married with him. Years later, because of her consistency in defending Hwang Jung-ho, she is promoted as the Corruption Investigation Office for High-Ranking Officials by the government. However due to this promotion, her husband is tasked to stop her.

- Jung Man-sik as Do Yeong-geol, Han Jeong-hyeon's former senior at the National Intelligence Service, formerly Agency for National Security Planning
  - Park Doo-sik as young Do Yeong-geol
- Huh Joon-ho as Im Hyeong-rak, director at the National Intelligence Service

=== Supporting ===
==== Family of Han Jeong-hyeon and Choi Yeon-soo ====
- Yoo Seon-ho as Han Seung-goo

Suk-kyu/Jeong-hyeon and Yeon-soo's autistic older son. He has an obsession with bicycles, therefore he helps his father operate their bicycle repair shop.

- Lee Jae-in as Han Seung-mi

Suk-kyu/Jeong-hyeon and Yeon-soo younger daughter. A middle school student with maturity and intelligence beyond her age. She resembles her mother in everything

- Park Geun-hyung as Lee Man-ho

Lee Suk-kyu's father and a war veteran, being proud of his son who serves the country like he did in the past. He believes that Suk-kyu went to the US when actually he has to live under name of Han Jeong-hyeon. His health deteriorates as he waits for his son to come back to him. Since Suk-kyu cannot reveal his identity, he spends time with his father in the hospital, posing as a social worker. Man-ho never realizes that his son is always with him even until his death.

==== National Intelligence Service ====
- Kwon Hae-hyo as Oh Pil-jae
- Joo Suk-tae as Park Won-jong
- Han Go-eun as Kim Do-hee/Ko Yoon-joo, an undercover agent
  - Park Gyeong-ree as young Ko Yoon-joo
- Choi Dae-chul as Chu Dong-woo
- Nam Sung-jin as Jo Dong-pal/Cha Min-ho

==== People around Choi Yeon-soo ====
- Lee Han-wi as Bae Goo-taek
- Bae Yoon-kyung as Song Mi-seon
- Kim Soo-jin as Min Sang-ah, Choi Yeon-soo's best friend in college, and a political reporter for a major media house
  - Han Bo-bae as young Min Sang-ah
- Choi Kwang-il as Hwang Jung-ho
  - Im Ji-kyu as young Hwang Jung-ho

30 years ago, he was wrongly accused of a murder case and was sentenced to death. Therefore, while he was incarcerated on death row, Choi Yeon-soo is determined to seek justice for him as his lawyer. However his case hasn't got any shed of light for 30 years, even after his health severely deteriorated.

- Kim Hye-jin as Cha Min-ho's wife

=== Others ===
- Lee Seung-joon as Kang Choong-mo, Choi Yeon-soo's good friend in college, now a high ranking government official working at the Blue House
  - Hong Jin-gi as young Kang Choong-mo
- Kang Young-seok as Jung Cheol-hoon, a passionate detective
- Park Jin-woo as Detective Gu
- Son Jong-hak as Yoo Sang-dong
- Song Young-gyu as Kwak Moon-heum, Chief Prosecutor
- Cha Soon-bae as Song Moon-bae, Chief Editor at Daehan Jeil Daily

=== Special appearances ===
- Kim Young-dae as Kim Tae-yeol

Kim Tae-yeol is a president of Hankuk University Student Council and leader of the mass protest against the government in 1991. Eventually he was accused as a communist and being targeted, then murdered by NIS.

- Jang Eui-don as police university instructor (ep. 1)
- Lim Jung-ok as Nurse Kim (ep. 1-2)
- Kim Dong-ho as Cheon Woo-jin, Im Hyeong-rak's subordinate (ep. 2 & 8)
- Jung In-gi as Kim Myung-jae, Secretary General of the Blue House
- Kim Kyung-min as Mr. Park
- Shim Hyung-tak as Lee Min-yool (ep. 3-4)

A man who claims himself being intentionally beaten by Han Seung-goo so that Yeon-soo would be hindered to be the new chief of Corruption Investigation Office for High-Ranking Officials. Actually at that time, he abused his girlfriend and being caught by Seung-goo who said that a bigger person might not hit smaller person.

- Park Joo-hyung as drug gang boss (ep. 4)
- Kim Young-woong as subway control room staff (ep. 3)
- Lee Se-na as Kim Da-kyung (ep. 4)

Ex-girlfriend of Lee Min-yool. Being guilty with Seung-goo's situation, she confessed about what happened between her, Min-yool and Seung-goo to Yeon-soo.

- Seo Joon
- Lim Hyung-guk
- Ahn Se-ho as Kim Kwang-cheol, an assistant to Do Yeong-geol

== Production ==
=== Development ===
In April 2020, the remake of the British miniseries was announced.

=== Casting ===
In July, JTBC confirmed that with the joining of Yeon Woo-jin and Han Sun-hwa the cast is completed: Ji Jin-hee, Kim Hyun-joo, Han Go-eun, Huh Joon-ho, Jung Man-sik, Kwon Hae-hyo, Park Geun-hyung, Lee Seung-joon, Lee Han-wi, Kim Soo-jin, Choi Dae-chul, Son Jong-hak, Song Young-gyu and Choi Kwang-il. This drama serves as a reunion project for Ji Jin-hee and Kim Hyun-joo after starring together in the 2015 drama I Have a Lover. It also reunites Ji Jin-hee and Huh Joon-ho who both starred in the 2019 drama Designated Survivor: 60 Days. Also reuniting in this series are Jung Man-sik, Choi Dae-chul and Choi Kwang-il who starred in the 2019 drama Vagabond.

== Original soundtrack ==
Undercover

Soundtrack album by Various
- Released: 2021
- Genre: Soundtrack
- Languages: Korean; English
- Label: Kakao Entertainment

=== Part 1 ===
Released on April 23, 2021
No.	Title	Lyrics	Music	Artist	Length
1.	"That Kind of Person" (그런 사람)	Kim Young-sung	Kim Young-seong, Seo Jae-ha, Do-hoon	Han Dong-geun	3:33
2.	"That Kind of Person" (Inst.)				3:33

=== Part 2 ===
Released on April 30, 2021
No.	Title	Lyrics	Music	Artist	Length
1.	"On a Secluded Road" (타이틀 외딴길에서)	Park Kang- il	Park Kang- il	Sondia, Kim Joon-Hwi	3:54
2.	"On a Secluded Road" (Inst.)				3:54

=== Part 3 ===
Released on May 8, 2021
No.	Title	Lyrics	Music	Artist	Length
1.	"My Day" (나의 하루)	Donnie J	Donnie J	Sondia	4:08
2.	"My Day" (Inst.)				4:08

=== Part 4 ===
Released on May 14, 2021
No.	Title	Lyrics	Music	Artist	Length
1.	"Where Are You"	Safira.K(Psycho Tension)	Psycho Tension (DOO, Safira.K, Jeong Seongmin)	KATIE	4:03
2.	"Where Are You" (Inst.)		Psycho Tension		4:03

=== Part 5 ===
Released on May 22, 2021
No.	Title	Lyrics	Music	Artist	Length
1.	"I remember this moment" (이 순간을 기억해요)	Noheul(노을)	Noheul(노을)	고영배 of 소란	3:01
2.	"I remember this moment" (Inst.)		Noheul(노을)		3:01

=== Part 6 ===
Released on May 28, 2021
No.	Title	Lyrics	Music	Artist	Length
1.	"With You Under the Sky" (하늘 아래 그대와)	Hana	Tom Irang Jerry, Um Ki-yeop, Safira.	Huh Gak	3:56
2.	"With You Under the Sky" (Inst.)				3:56

=== Part 7 ===
Released on June 5, 2021
No.	Title	Lyrics	Music	Artist	Length
1.	"With You Under the Sky" (하늘 아래 그대와 (English Ver.))	하나, Safira.k	Tom Irang Jerry, Um Ki-yeop, Safira.	Safira.K (사피라 K)	3:55
2.	"With You Under the Sky" (하늘 아래 그대와 (English Ver.) (Inst.))				3:55

=== Special ===
Released on June 11, 2021
No.	Title	Lyrics	Music	Artist	Length
1.	"That Kind of Person" (그런 사람)	Kim Young-sung	Kim Young-seong, Seo Jae-ha, Do-hoon	Han Dong-geun	3:34
2.	"On a Secluded Road" (타이틀 외딴길에서)	Park Kang- il	Park Kang- il	Sondia, Kim Joon-Hwi	3:53
3.	"My Day" (나의 하루)	Donnie J	Donnie J	Sondia	4:08
4.	"Where Are You"	Safira.K(Psycho Tension)	Psycho Tension (DOO, Safira.K, Jeong Seongmin)	KATIE	3:39
5.	"I remember this moment" (이 순간을 기억해요)	Noheul (노을)	Noheul (노을)	고영배 of 소란	3:01
6.	"Under the Lonely Sky" (하늘 아래 그대와)	Hana	Tom Irang Jerry, Um Ki-yeop, Safira.	Huh Gak	3:56
7.	"With You Under the Sky (English Ver.)" (하늘 아래 그대와 (English Ver.))	하나, Safira.k	Tom Irang Jerry, Um Ki-yeop, Safira.	Safira.K (사피라 K)	3:55
8.	"When I Close My Eyes"			Choi Sol-ji (최솔지)	3:05
9.	"Your undercover"			Park Mi-ji (박미지)	2:24
10.	"Into the battlefield"			Ahn So-young (안소영), Hong Seung Hyun (홍승현)	3:28
11.	"Dark Forces"			Park Min-ji (박민지)	3:14
12.	"Untruth"			Ahn So-young (안소영), Hong Seung Hyun (홍승현)	3:30
13.	"Sunrise"			Um Gi-yeop (엄기엽)	4:26
14.	"Lonely Road"			Park Min-ji (박민지)	4:25
15.	"A door without a memory"			Um Gi-yeop (엄기엽)	2:37
16.	"The widow's cruse"			Um Gi-yeop (엄기엽)	2:37
17.	"Successful Resolution (성공적해결)"			Roark, Park Kyu-seo (박규서)	1:49
18.	"Clues to the Crime"			Eom Gi-hyun (엄기현)	2:34
19.	"Traces of the Past"			Kim Tae-tin (김태진)	2:47
20.	"Endless Run (끝없는질주)"			Roark, Park Kyu-seo (박규서)	1:50
21.	"A Secret Agent"			Park Min-ji (박민지)	2:42

== Viewership ==
Undercover : South Korea viewers per episode (thousands)

Season	Episode number																Average
Season	1	2	3	4	5	6	7	8	9	10	11	12	13	14	15	16	Average
1	763	816	583	736	627	903	628	862	773	988	793	818	847	916	769	1163	812

Source: Audience measurement performed nationwide by Nielsen Korea

Average TV viewership ratings
Ep.	Original broadcast date	Average audience share (Nielsen Korea)	
Ep.	Original broadcast date	Nationwide	Seoul
1	April 23, 2021	3.471% (7th)	4.139% (5th)
2	April 24, 2021	3.785% (5th)	4.866% (1st)
3	April 30, 2021	2.800% (NR)	3.355% (9th)
4	May 1, 2021	3.367% (4th)	4.283% (1st)
5	May 7, 2021	2.885% (NR)	3.466% (6th)
6	May 8, 2021	4.243% (3rd)	5.115% (1st)
7	May 14, 2021	3.041% (10th)	3.963% (5th)
8	May 15, 2021	4.175% (5th)	5.555% (2nd)
9	May 21, 2021	3.777% (6th)	4.471% (4th)
10	May 22, 2021	4.187% (4th)	4.939% (2nd)
11	May 28, 2021	3.768% (5th)	4.503% (4th)
12	May 29, 2021	3.816% (5th)	4.696% (2nd)
13	June 4, 2021	3.922% (5th)	4.437% (5th)
14	June 5, 2021	4.517% (5th)	5.279% (3rd)
15	June 11, 2021	3.916% (8th)	4.645% (4th)
16	June 12, 2021	5.229% (4th)	6.115% (2nd)
Average		3.806%	4.614%
In the table above, the blue numbers represent the lowest ratings and the red numbers represent the highest ratings.; This drama airs on a cable channel/pay TV which normally has a relatively smaller audience compared to free-to-air TV/public broadcasters (KBS, SBS, MBC and EBS).; NR denotes that the series did not rank in the top 20 daily programs on that date.
