= 2015 SBS Drama Awards =

23rd edition of award ceremony

- Date: December 31, 2015
- Site: COEX Hall D in Samseong-dong, Seoul
- Hosted by: Lee Hwi-jae; Lim Ji-yeon; Yoo Jun-sang
- Official website: SBS 연기대상

Television coverage
- Network: SBS

The 2015 SBS Drama Awards (Korean: SBS 연기대상), presented by Seoul Broadcasting System (SBS), took place on December 31, 2015 at COEX Hall D in Samseong-dong, Seoul. It was hosted by Lee Hwi-jae, Lim Ji-yeon, and Yoo Jun-sang.

== Winners and nominees ==
(Winners denoted in bold)

Grand Prize (Daesang)
**Joo Won** - **Yong-pal** as **Kim Tae-hyun**
Top Excellence Award, Actor in a Miniseries	Top Excellence Award, Actress in a Miniseries
**Park Yoo-chun** - **A Girl Who Sees Smells** as **Choi Mu-gak**; Lee Jin-wook - The Time We Were Not in Love as Choi Won; Joo Won - Yong-pal as Kim Tae-hyun	**Kim Tae-hee** - **Yong-pal** as **Han Yeo-jin**; Kim Hee-ae - Mrs. Cop as Choi Young-jin; Ha Ji-won - The Time We Were Not in Love as Oh Ha-na
Top Excellence Award, Actor in a Mid-length Drama	Top Excellence Award, Actress in a Mid-length Drama
**Yoo Jun-sang** - **Heard It Through the Grapevine** as **Han Jeong-ho**; **Cho Jae-hyun** - **Punch** as **Lee Tae-joon/Prosecutor General**; Kim Rae-won - Punch as Park Jung-hwan; Hyun Bin - Hyde Jekyll, Me as Gu Seo-jin/Robin/Terry	**Choi Myung-gil** - **Punch** as **Yoon Ji-sook/Minister of Justice**; Kim Ah-joong - Punch as Shin Ha-kyung; Lee Jung-hyun - The Family is Coming as Na Joon-hee/Susan Johnson; Han Ji-min - Hyde Jekyll, Me as Jang Ha-na
Top Excellence Award, Actor in a Serial Drama	Top Excellence Award, Actress in a Serial Drama
**Yoo Ah-in** - **Six Flying Dragons** as **Yi Bang-won/King Taejong**; Kim Myung-min - Six Flying Dragons as Jeong Do-jeon; Ji Jin-hee - I Have a Lover as Choi Jin-eon; Chun Ho-jin - Six Flying Dragons as Yi Seong-gye/King Taejo	**Kim Hyun-joo** - **I Have a Lover** as **Do Hae-gang/Dokgo Yong-gi**; Kim Hye-ri - My Mother Is a Daughter-in-law as Choo Kyung-suk; Shim Hye-jin - The Return of Hwang Geum-bok as Baek Ri-hyang; Yoon Son-ha - Six Flying Dragons as Cho-young
Excellence Award, Actor in a Miniseries	Excellence Award, Actress in a Miniseries
**Park Hyung-sik** - **High Society** as **Yoo Chang-soo**; Kim Min-jong - Mrs. Cop as Park Jong-ho; Yeon Woo-jin - Divorce Lawyer in Love as So Jung-woo; Sung Joon - High Society as Choi Joon-ki	**Moon Geun-young** - **The Village: Achiara's Secret** as **Han So-yoon**; Uee - High Society as Jang Yoon-ha; Shin Eun-kyung - The Village: Achiara's Secret as Yoon Ji-sook; Cho Yeo-jeong - Divorce Lawyer in Love as Go Cheok-hee
Excellence Award, Actor in a Mid-length Drama	Excellence Award, Actress in a Mid-length Drama
**Ju Ji-hoon** - **Mask** as **Choi Min-woo**; Kim Seung-woo - Late Night Restaurant as Master; Sung Joon - Hyde Jekyll, Me as Yoon Tae-joo/Lee Soo-hyun; Yeon Jung-hoon - Mask as Min Seok-hoon	**Go Ah-sung** - **Heard It Through the Grapevine** as **Seo Bom**; Shin Eun-jung - Hyde Jekyll, Me as Kang Hee-ae; Yoo Ho-jeong - Heard It Through the Grapevine as Choi Yeon-hee
Excellence Award, Actor in a Serial Drama	Excellence Award, Actress in a Serial Drama
**Byun Yo-han** - **Six Flying Dragons** as **Ddang-sae**; Go Joo-won - Run, Jang-mi as Hwang Tae-ja; Lee Kyu-han - I Have a Lover as Baek-seok; Choi Jong-won - Six Flying Dragons as Yi In-gyeom	**Shin Se-kyung** - **Six Flying Dragons** as **Boon-yi**; Shin Da-eun - The Return of Hwang Geum-bok as Hwang Geum-bok; Shim Yi-young - My Mother Is a Daughter-in-law as Yoo Hyun-joo; Lee Young-ah - Run, Jang-mi as Baek Jang-mi
Special Award, Actor in a Miniseries	Special Award, Actress in a Miniseries
**Namkoong Min** - **A Girl Who Sees Smells** as **Kwon Jae-hee/Jay Kwon Ford**; Jung Woong-in - Yong-pal as Chief Lee; Son Ho-jun - Mrs. Cop as Han Jin-woo; Jo Hyun-jae - Yong-pal as Han Do-joon	**Lee Da-hee** - **Mrs. Cop** as **Min Do-young**; Bae Hye-sun - Yong-pal as Nurse Hwang; Yoon Jin-seo - A Girl Who Sees Smells as Yeom Mi; Jang So-yeon - The Village: Achiara's Secret as Kang Joo-hee
Special Award, Actor in a Mid-length Drama	Special Award, Actress in a Mid-length Drama
**Jang Hyun-sung** - **Heard It Through the Grapevine** as **Seo Hyeong-shik**; Kim Eung-soo - Punch as Jung Gook-hyun; Lee Seung-joon - Hyde Jekyll, Me as Kwon Young-chan; On Joo-wan - Punch as Lee Ho-sung	**Yoo In-young** - **Mask** as **Choi Mi-yeon**; Park Won-sook - The Family is Coming as Jung Kkeut-soon/Audrey Jung; Baek Ji-yeon - Heard It Through the Grapevine as Ji Young-ra; Seo Ji-hye - Punch as Choi Yeon-jin
Special Award, Actor in a Serial Drama	Special Award, Actress in a Serial Drama
**Park Hyuk-kwon** - **Six Flying Dragons** as **Gil Tae-mi/Gil Sun-mi**; Bae Soo-bin - My Heart Twinkle Twinkle as Chun Woon-tak; Jeon No-min - Six Flying Dragons as Hong In-bang; Jung Eun-woo - The Return of Hwang Geum-bok as Kang Moon-hyuk	**Park Han-byul** - **I Have a Lover** as **Kang Seol-ri**; Jeong Yu-mi - Six Flying Dragons as Yeon-hee; Yoon Son-ha - Enchanting Neighbor as Gong Su-rae; Baek Ji-won - I Have a Lover as Choi Jin-ri
Special Award, Actor in a Daily Drama	Special Award, Actress in a Daily Drama
**Lee Han-wi** - **My Mother Is a Daughter-in-law** as **Park Bong-joo**	**Jeon Mi-seon** - **The Return of Hwang Geum-bok** as **Hwang Eun-sil**
Netizen Popularity Award	Lifetime Achievement Award
**Kim Hyun-joo** - **I Have a Lover**	**Lee Deok-hwa**
Best Couple	Producer's Award
**Ji Jin-hee** and **Kim Hyun-joo** - **I Have a Lover**; **Joo Won** and **Kim Tae-hee** - **Yong-pal**; **Yoo Ah-in** and **Shin Se-kyung** - **Six Flying Dragons**; Lee Joon and Go Ah-sung - Heard It Through the Grapevine; Yoo Jun-sang and Yoo Ho-jeong - Heard It Through the Grapevine; Sung Joon and Uee - High Society; Park Hyung-sik and Lim Ji-yeon - High Society; Kim Rae-won and Kim Ah-joong - Punch; Ju Ji-hoon and Soo Ae - Mask; Lee Jin-wook and Ha Ji-won - The Time We Were Not in Love; Hyun Bin and Han Ji-min - Hyde Jekyll, Me; Park Yoo-chun and Shin Se-kyung - A Girl Who Sees Smells	**Kim Rae-won** - **Punch**; Kim Hee-ae - Mrs. Cop; Yoo Ah-in - Six Flying Dragons; Yoo Jun-sang - Heard It Through the Grapevine; Cho Jae-hyun - Punch; Joo Won - Yong-pal
Top 10 Stars	New Star Award
**Joo Won - Yong-pal**; **Kim Hyun-joo - I Have a Lover**; **Ju Ji-hoon - Mask**; **Kim Tae-hee - Yong-pal**; **Yoo Ah-in - Six Flying Dragons**; **Moon Geun-young - The Village: Achiara's Secret**; **Cho Jae-hyun - Punch**; **Shin Se-kyung - A Girl Who Sees Smells, Six Flying Dragons**; **Ji Jin-hee - I Have a Lover**; **Park Yoo-chun - A Girl Who Sees Smells**	**Gong Seung-yeon - Heard It Through the Grapevine, Six Flying Dragons**; **Byun Yo-han - Six Flying Dragons**; **Lee Yeol-eum - The Village: Achiara's Secret, Divorce Lawyer in Love**; **Yook Sungjae - The Village: Achiara's Secret**; **Lee Elijah - The Return of Hwang Geum-bok**; **Park Hyung-sik - High Society**; **Lim Ji-yeon - High Society**; **Yoon Kyun-sang - The Time We Were Not in Love, Six Flying Dragons**; **Go Ah-sung - Heard It Through the Grapevine**; **Son Ho-jun - Mrs. Cop**
