= Spotlight (South Korean TV series) =

2008 South Korea television series

- Genre: Workplace drama
- Written by: Lee Ki-won
- Directed by: Kim Do-hoon
- Starring: Son Ye-jin; Ji Jin-hee; Jo Yoon-hee; Jin Goo
- Country of origin: South Korea
- Original language: Korean
- No. of episodes: 16

Production
- Executive producer: Oh Gyeong-hoon
- Running time: 60 minutes

Original release
- Network: Munhwa Broadcasting Corporation
- Release: May 14 – July 3, 2008

Spotlight (Korean: 스포트라이트) is a 2008 South Korean television series, starring Son Ye-jin and Ji Jin-hee. It aired on MBC from May 14 to July 3, 2008, on Wednesdays and Thursdays at 21:55 for 16 episodes.

The series revolves around the world of television news and the lives of four news reporters.

== Plot ==
Oh Tae Suk (Ji Jin-hee), a supervisor in a news division, works with his junior reporter Seo Woo Jin (Son Ye-jin) to expose the injustices of society.

== Cast ==
=== Main characters ===
- Son Ye-jin as Seo Woo-jin
- Ji Jin-hee as Oh Tae-suk
- Jo Yoon-hee as Cha Myung-eun
- Jin Goo as Lee Seon-chul

=== Supporting characters ===
- Kim Jeong-wook as Seo Woo-hyeon
- Kim Bo-kyung as Lee Joo-hee
- Ahn Suk-hwan as Ahn Joong-seok
- Lee Ki-yeol as Moon Jae-gook
- Jeong Gyu-soo as Jeong Seong-il
- Lee Dae-yeon as Det. Go Byung-chun
- Jeong Jin as Jang Jin-gyu
- Im Seung-dae as Lee Choon-ki
- Park Yong-gi as Director Lee Jae-myeong
- Min Ah-ryung as Reporter Jung
- Park Yoon-jae as Yoon Seok-chang
- Jeon In-taek as Woo-jin's father
- Geum Bo-ra as Woo-jin's mother
- Jung Hye-young as Kim Mi-hee (cameo, episode 1)
- Kim Cheol-ki as Mi-hee's husband
- Shin Chae-won
- Min Seo-hyun
- Jeong Hoon
- Choi Seung-kyung
- Kim Hyun-joong as SS501 member (cameo, episode 1)
- SS501 (cameo)
- Ryu Ui-hyun

== Ratings ==
Episode #	Original broadcast date	Average audience share	
Episode #	Original broadcast date	AGB Nielsen	
Episode #	Original broadcast date	Nationwide	Seoul National Capital Area
1	May 14, 2008	8.6%	9.7%
2	May 15, 2008		8.8%
3	May 21, 2008	11.4%	12.8%
4	May 22, 2008	11.2%	12.5%
5	May 28, 2008	13.2%	14.3%
6	May 29, 2008	11.4%	12.6%
7	June 4, 2008	11.2%	12.5%
8	June 5, 2008	11.5%	12.9%
9	June 11, 2008	10.1%	11.5%
10	June 12, 2008	10.2%	12.1%
11	June 18, 2008	9.4%	10.6%
12	June 19, 2008	10.2%	11.7%
13	June 25, 2008	9.6%	11.7%
14	June 26, 2008	8.9%	10.3%
15	July 2, 2008	9.1%	10.7%
16	July 3, 2008	9.3%	10.5%
Average			11.6%
