= 2014 KBS Drama Awards =

28th edition of award ceremony

- Date: December 31, 2014
- Hosted by: Kim Sang-kyung; Park Min-young; Seo In-guk
- Official website: 2014 KBS 연기대상

Television coverage
- Network: KBS, KBS World

The 2014 KBS Drama Awards, presented by Korean Broadcasting System (KBS), took place on December 31, 2014 in Yeouido, Seoul. It was hosted by actors Kim Sang-kyung, Park Min-young and Seo In-guk.

== Winners and nominees ==
(Winners denoted in bold)

Grand Prize (Daesang)
**Yoo Dong-geun** – **What Happens to My Family?**, **Jeong Do-jeon**
Top Excellence Award, Actor	Top Excellence Award, Actress
**Cho Jae-hyun** – **Jeong Do-jeon**; Eric Mun – Discovery of Love; Kang Ji-hwan – Big Man; Kim Sang-kyung – What Happens to My Family?; Lee Joon-gi – Gunman in Joseon; Yoo Dong-geun – What Happens to My Family?, Jeong Do-jeon	**Kim Hyun-joo** – **What Happens to My Family?**; Jang Seo-hee – Two Mothers; Jung Yu-mi – Discovery of Love; Kim Hee-sun – Wonderful Days; Nam Sang-mi – Gunman in Joseon; Youn Yuh-jung – Wonderful Days
Excellence Award, Actor in a Miniseries	Excellence Award, Actress in a Miniseries
**Eric Mun** – **Discovery of Love**; Choi Daniel – Big Man; Joo Won – Naeil's Cantabile; Kang Ji-hwan – Big Man; Sung Joon – Discovery of Love	**Jung Yu-mi** – **Discovery of Love**; Jung Eun-ji – Lovers of Music; Lee Da-hee – Big Man; Shim Eun-kyung – Naeil's Cantabile; Shin Se-kyung – Blade Man
Excellence Award, Actor in a Mid-length Drama	Excellence Award, Actress in a Mid-length Drama
**Lee Joon-gi** – **Gunman in Joseon**; Ji Chang-wook – Healer; Kim Hyun-joong – Inspiring Generation; Kim Kang-woo – Golden Cross; Seo In-guk – The King's Face; Yoo Ji-tae – Healer	**Nam Sang-mi** – **Gunman in Joseon**; **Park Min-young** – **Healer**; Im Soo-hyang – Inspiring Generation; Jo Yoon-hee – The King's Face; Lee Si-young – Golden Cross
Excellence Award, Actor in a Serial Drama	Excellence Award, Actress in a Serial Drama
**Kim Sang-kyung** – **What Happens to My Family?**; **Park Yeong-gyu** – **Jeong Do-jeon**; Cho Jae-hyun – Jeong Do-jeon; Lee Seo-jin and Ok Taecyeon – Wonderful Days; Yoo Dong-geun – What Happens to My Family?, Jeong Do-jeon	**Kim Ji-ho** – **Wonderful Days**; Jo Yang-ja – Hometown Over the Hill 2; Kim Hee-sun – Wonderful Days; Kim Hyun-joo and Yang Hee-kyung – What Happens to My Family?
Excellence Award, Actor in a Daily Drama	Excellence Award, Actress in a Daily Drama
**Choi Jae-sung** – **Single-minded Dandelion**; Kang Eun-tak – Land of Gold; Kim Heung-soo – Love & Secret; Hwang Dong-joo – Two Mothers; Hyun Woo – My Dear Cat; Park Jung-chul – Angel's Revenge	**Choi Yoon-young** – **My Dear Cat**; **Shin So-yul** – **Love & Secret**; Jang Seo-hee – Two Mothers; Kang Ye-sol – Land of Gold; Kim Ga-eun – Single-minded Dandelion; Yoon So-yi – Angel's Revenge
Excellence Award, Actor in a One-Act/Special/Short Drama	Excellence Award, Actress in a One-Act/Special/Short Drama
**Jo Dal-hwan** – **Drama Special "Repulsive Love"**; Ahn Jae-mo – Drama Special "Vengeful Spirit"; Han Joo-wan – Drama Special "The Tale of the Bookworm"; Oh Jung-se – Drama Special "I'm Dying Soon"; Seo Jun-young – Drama Special "The Dirge Singer"; Yeon Joon-seok – Drama Special "Monster"	**Kim So-hyun** – **Drama Special "We All Cry Differently"**; Kim Yoo-jung – Drama Special "The Dirge Singer"; Lee Yeol-eum – Drama Special "Middle School Student A"; Park Eun-hye – Drama Special "Vengeful Spirit"; Woo Hee-jin – Drama Special "Playing Games"
Best Supporting Actor	Best Supporting Actress
**Shin Sung-rok** – **Lovers of Music**, **The King's Face**; Cho Jin-woong – Beyond the Clouds; Im Ho – Jeong Do-jeon; Ryu Seung-soo – Wonderful Days; Yu Oh-seong – Gunman in Joseon	**Han Eun-jung** – **Golden Cross**; **Lee Chae-young** – **Two Mothers**; Jeon Hye-bin – Gunman in Joseon; Jin Kyung – Wonderful Days, Drama Special "The Girl Who Became a Photo"; Son Dam-bi – What Happens to My Family?
Best New Actor	Best New Actress
**Park Hyung-sik** – **What Happens to My Family?**; **Seo In-guk** – **The King's Face**; Park Bo-gum – Naeil's Cantabile, Wonderful Days; Seo Kang-joon – What Happens to My Family?; Son Ho-jun – Lovers of Music, Beyond the Clouds; Yoon Hyun-min – Inspiring Generation, Discovery of Love	**Kim Seul-gi** – **Discovery of Love, Drama Special "I'm Dying Soon"**; **Nam Ji-hyun** – **What Happens to My Family?**; Jung Eun-ji – Lovers of Music; Kim Ga-eun – Single-minded Dandelion, Gunman in Joseon; Shin So-yul – Love & Secret, Drama Special "Playing Games"
Best Young Actor	Best Young Actress
**Kwak Dong-yeon** – **Inspiring Generation, Drama Special "Middle School Student A"**; Choi Kwon-soo – Wonderful Days, Naeil's Cantabile; Jung Jae-min – Land of Gold; Jung Yoo-geun – Blade Man; Jung Yoon-seok – Jeong Do-jeon	**Ahn Seo-hyun** – **Single-minded Dandelion, Drama Special "Bomi's Room"**; **Hong Hwa-ri** – **Wonderful Days**; Joo Da-young – Inspiring Generation; Kim Sae-ron – Hi! School-Love On; Kim Hyun-soo – Gunman in Joseon; Park Ha-young – Land of Gold
Netizen Award, Actor	Netizen Award, Actress
**Eric Mun** – **Discovery of Love**	**Jung Yu-mi** – **Discovery of Love**
Popularity Award, Actor	Popularity Award, Actress
**Ji Chang-wook** – **Healer**; **Joo Won** – **Naeil's Cantabile**	**Jung Eun-ji** – **Lovers of Music**; **Lee Da-hee** – **Big Man**
Best Couple Award	Best Writer
**Eric Mun** and **Jung Yu-mi** – **Discovery of Love**; **Ji Chang-wook** and **Park Min-young** – **Healer**; **Kim Sang-kyung** and **Kim Hyun-joo** – **What Happens to My Family?**; **Lee Joon-gi** and **Nam Sang-mi** – **Gunman in Joseon**; **Park Hyung-sik** and **Nam Ji-hyun** – **What Happens to My Family?**	**Jung Hyun-min** – **Jeong Do-jeon**; **Kang Eun-kyung** – **What Happens to My Family?**
**Eric Mun** and **Jung Yu-mi** – **Discovery of Love**; **Ji Chang-wook** and **Park Min-young** – **Healer**; **Kim Sang-kyung** and **Kim Hyun-joo** – **What Happens to My Family?**; **Lee Joon-gi** and **Nam Sang-mi** – **Gunman in Joseon**; **Park Hyung-sik** and **Nam Ji-hyun** – **What Happens to My Family?**	PD Award
**Eric Mun** and **Jung Yu-mi** – **Discovery of Love**; **Ji Chang-wook** and **Park Min-young** – **Healer**; **Kim Sang-kyung** and **Kim Hyun-joo** – **What Happens to My Family?**; **Lee Joon-gi** and **Nam Sang-mi** – **Gunman in Joseon**; **Park Hyung-sik** and **Nam Ji-hyun** – **What Happens to My Family?**	**Cho Jae-hyun** – **Jeong Do-jeon**
**Eric Mun** and **Jung Yu-mi** – **Discovery of Love**; **Ji Chang-wook** and **Park Min-young** – **Healer**; **Kim Sang-kyung** and **Kim Hyun-joo** – **What Happens to My Family?**; **Lee Joon-gi** and **Nam Sang-mi** – **Gunman in Joseon**; **Park Hyung-sik** and **Nam Ji-hyun** – **What Happens to My Family?**	Lifetime Achievement Award
**Eric Mun** and **Jung Yu-mi** – **Discovery of Love**; **Ji Chang-wook** and **Park Min-young** – **Healer**; **Kim Sang-kyung** and **Kim Hyun-joo** – **What Happens to My Family?**; **Lee Joon-gi** and **Nam Sang-mi** – **Gunman in Joseon**; **Park Hyung-sik** and **Nam Ji-hyun** – **What Happens to My Family?**	**The Late Kim Ja-ok**
