= In-soon Is Pretty =

2007 South Korean television drama series

- Hangul: 인순이는 예쁘다
- RR: Insunineun yeppeuda
- MR: Insuninŭn yeppŭda
- Genre: Drama
- Created by: KBS Drama Production
- Written by: Jung Yoo-gyung
- Directed by: Pyo Min-soo
- Starring: Kim Hyun-joo; Kim Min-jun; Lee Wan
- Country of origin: South Korea
- Original language: Korean
- No. of episodes: 16

Production
- Producer: Choi Ji-young
- Running time: 60 minutes

Original release
- Network: KBS2
- Release: November 7 – December 27, 2007

In-soon is pretty (Korean: 인순이는 예쁘다) is a 2007 South Korean television series starring Kim Hyun-joo, Kim Min-jun, and Lee Wan. It aired on KBS2's Wednesday and Thursday at 09:50 – 10:50 (KST) from November 7 to December 27, 2007.

== Synopsis ==
The story of reconciling life after prison of Park In-soo, a girl accidentally killed a bully in high school. She was convicted of the crime of manslaughter. After imprisonment, she tried to start her new life. But her criminal records made her difficult to find jobs and face discrimination from people. With a variety of events, soon reunited with her mother, who abandoned her as soon as her father died, meet with her high school teacher to find encourage or even decided to commit suicide. Can she still have a new happy life?

== Cast ==
=== Main ===
- Kim Hyun-joo as Park In-sun
  - Hong Ah-reum as teenage Park In-soon
- Kim Min-jun as Yoo Sang-woo
  - Choi Won-tae as teenage Yoo Sang-woo
- Lee Wan as Chang Keun-soo.

=== Supporting ===
==== People around Sang-woo ====
- Kim Mi-kyung as Oh Myung-sook (Sang Woo's mother)
- Choi Il-hwa as Yoo Byung-gook (Sang Woo's father)
- Na Yoon as Song Jin-tae (TV station)
- Jo Deok-hyeon as Go Jae-sik(TV station)
- Lee In-hye as Han Jae-eun

==== People around In-soon ====
- Na Young-hee as Lee Seon-young (In Soon's mother)
- Seo Hyo-rim as Kim Jung-ah (In Soon's sister)
- Eom Hyo-seop as Seo Kyung-joon (high school teacher)
- Lee Hyun-joon as Seo Eun-seok (Kyung Joon's son)
- Park Soon-cheon as Park Ok-seon (In Soon's aunt)
- Jang Young-ran as Go Mi-hwa (In Soon's friend)

==== Others ====
- Cha Young-ok as Nam So-jeong (Sun Young's friend)
- Lee Mae-ri as Han Mi-jin (high school cafeteria)

== Original soundtrack ==
No.	Title	Artist	Length
1.	"사랑을 보았나봐"	FTIsland	3:20
2.	"The Answer"	Shin Sang Wu	5:32
3.	"언제까지나"	Chae Dong	4:49
4.	"Sugar Tango"	고광일	3:50
5.	"너를 잡기 전에"	Jeon Geun Hwa	3:56
6.	"Mom & I"	정태유	2:40
7.	"사랑만 사랑만 사랑하나만"	Jeon Geun Hwa	4:28
8.	"Love Like This"	이경섭	2:43
9.	"The Peace"	Shin Sang Wu	6:26
10.	"눈을 뜨면"	Jung	4:01
11.	"빛"	이정철	2:32
12.	"Walking In The Sky"	고광일	3:39
13.	"The Comfort"	Shin Sang Wu	3:18
14.	"Don't Let Me Go"	이경섭	2:47
15.	"Simply May"	고광일	2:37

== Production ==
- The drama started filming at 25 July 2007
- The press conference held at a cafe in Yongsan, Seoul on the 17th Oct, 2007
- This is Kim Hyun-joo's drama after two years
- This is the second collaboration between PD Pyo Min-soo and writer Jung Yoo-kyung of MBC's drama Which Star Are You From? .
- This is Kim Hyun-joo's first KBS appearance since her debut in 1997. This drama, Boys Over Flowers and Partner are three consecutive KBS dramas.
- Kim Hyun-joo appeared in this drama and did not get paid properly, so she filed a lawsuit against the drama's production company and her former agency, and eventually won .
- Director Pyo Min-soo, actors Seo Hyo-rim and Na Young-hee meet again in 2008 in drama The world they live in.

== Ratings ==
In this table, the blue numbers represent the lowest ratings and the red numbers represent the highest ratings.

Ep.	Original broadcast date	Average audience share
Ep.	Original broadcast date	AGB Nielsen
Ep.	Original broadcast date	Nationwide
1	November 7, 2007	5.4%
2	November 8, 2007	6.3%
3	November 14, 2007	7.0%
4	November 15, 2007	6.9%
5	November 21, 2007	6.5%
6	November 22, 2007	7.4%
7	November 28, 2007	6.8%
8	November 29, 2007	7.0%
9	December 5, 2007	6.2%
10	December 6, 2007	8.5%
11	December 12, 2007	8.7%
12	December 13, 2007	7.3%
13	December 19, 2007	10.4%
14	December 20, 2007	6.8%
15	December 26, 2007	5.6%
16	December 27, 2007	8.1%
Average		7.2%

== Awards and nominations ==
Year	Award	Category	Nominee	Result
2007	KBS Drama Awards	Top Excellence Award, Actress	Kim Hyun-joo	Won
2008	44th Baeksang Arts Awards	Best Actress (TV)	Kim Hyun-joo	Nominated
