= Watcher (TV series) =

2019 South Korean television series

- Promotional poster
- Hangul: 왓쳐
- RR: Watcheo
- MR: Watch'ŏ
- Genre: Crime; Thriller
- Created by: Studio Dragon
- Written by: Han Sang-woon
- Directed by: Ahn Gil-ho
- Starring: Han Suk-kyu; Seo Kang-joon; Kim Hyun-joo
- Country of origin: South Korea
- Original language: Korean
- No. of episodes: 16

Production
- Executive producers: Jinnie Choi; Kim Young-kyu
- Camera setup: Single-camera
- Production company: Studio Dragon

Original release
- Network: OCN
- Release: July 6 – August 25, 2019

Watcher (Korean: 왓쳐; stylized as WATCHER) is a 2019 South Korean television series starring Han Suk-kyu, Seo Kang-joon, and Kim Hyun-joo. It aired on OCN every Saturday and Sunday at 22:20 (KST) from July 6 to August 25, 2019.

== Synopsis ==
A brutal murder committed 15 years ago turned three lives upside down. A decade and a half later, the trio – brought together by fate – goes on the hunt for answers.

== Cast ==
=== Main ===
- Han Suk-kyu as Do Chi-kwang

A detective who has caught many criminals during his career. He hates corruption within the police and becomes leader of the internal affairs investigation team to find the truth about a particular incident.

- Seo Kang-joon as Kim Yeong-goon
  - Moon Woo-jin as young Kim Yeong-goon

A police officer who joins Do Chi-kwang's team after they become involved in the same incident.

- Kim Hyun-joo as Han Tae-joo

A former prosecutor turned lawyer after she got involved too deep while working on a case and almost died. She starts working with Do Chi-kwang and Kim Yeong Goon.

=== Supporting ===
- Heo Sung-tae as Jang Hae-ryong

Head of the Police Investigation Department, he is often in conflict with Do Chi-kwang.

- Park Joo-hee as Jo Soo-yeon

With a degree in Chemistry, she became part of the Scientific Investigation Team. After she makes a mistake, however, she decides to quit to join the internal affairs investigation team.

- Joo Jin-mo as Park Jin-woo

Deputy Commissioner of police force.

- Kim Soo-jin as Yeom Dong-sook

Commissioner of police force.

- Lee Joong-ok as Jae-shik's friend
- Ahn Gil-kang as Kim Jae-myung, Kim Yeong-goon's father
- Lee Jae-yoon as Kim Kang-wook
- Jung Do-won as Hong Jae-sik
- Kim Dae-gun as Detective Chan-hee
- Won Gun-su as Detective 2
- Park Hoon as Yoon Ji-hoon, Han Tae-joo's ex-husband
- Jung Min-sung as Son Byeong-gil
- Kim Dong-hyun as Kim Sang-joon
- Chae Dong-hyun as Lee Dong-yoon
- Yang Ye-na as Yoon-ji
- Kim Yong-ji as Lee Hyo-jung
- Park Sung-il as Department Head Kim
- Han Sang-hoon as Coroner
- Shin Hyun-jong as Min Young-ki
- Jung Soon-won as Jung Han-wook
- Yu Ha-jun as Oh Sang-do
- Park Ji-hoon as Park Si-young
- Lee Seung-chul as Chairman Jung Seok-tae
- Shin Mun-sung as Lee Joong-ho (EP.10)
- Lee Yoon-sun as Jang Ji-yoon (EP.14)

ADDITIONAL CAST

- Woo Jung-won as Park Ji-hyun
- Lee Nam-hee as Shin Woo-sung
- Jeon Suk-chan as Kim Jo-han
- Park Mi-hyun as Jo Hyun-kyung
- Kim Dan-woo as Areum (Son Byeong-gil's daughter)
- Lee Eol as Jang Hyun-soo
- Yoo Jung-ho as Park Jung-geum
- Kim Geon-u as Kim Cha-hoon
- Kim Ju-yeon as Baek Song-yi
- Han Seung-soo as Regional Investigation unit detective
- Jang Eui-don as Patient
- Yu Seung-il as Driving violator (ep.1)
- Park Yong

== Production ==
The series is directed by Ahn Gil-ho (Stranger, Memories of the Alhambra).

== Original soundtrack ==
Watcher OST

Soundtrack album by Various artists
- Released: 2019
- Genre: Soundtrack
- Languages: Korean; English
- Labels: Genie Music; Stone Music Entertainment

=== Part 1 ===
Released on July 21, 2019
No.	Title	Lyrics	Music	Artist	Length
1.	"Horizon"	Choi Jeong-in; Kim Tae-sung	Choi Jeong-in; POPKID	Ha Jin	3:10
2.	"Horizon" (Inst.)		Choi Jeong-in; POPKID		3:10
Total length:					6:20

=== Part 2 ===
Released on August 4, 2019
No.	Title	Lyrics	Music	Artist	Length
1.	"Watchin'"	nafla	Kim Tae-sung; Curtis F; Nathan	nafla	3:15
2.	"Watchin'" (Inst.)		Kim Tae-sung; Curtis F; Nathan		3:15
Total length:					6:30

=== Part 3 ===
Released on August 11, 2019
No.	Title	Lyrics	Music	Artist	Length
1.	"Blurry"	Naiv; Jayins	Park Geun-cheol; Jung Su-min; RUNY	Elli K	3:18
2.	"Blurry" (Inst.)		Park Geun-cheol; Jung Su-min; RUNY		3:18
Total length:					6:36

=== Part 4 ===
Released on August 18, 2019
No.	Title	Lyrics	Music	Artist	Length
1.	"Outsider" (아웃사이더)	Ha Mel-li	Lee Sang-hoon	Lee Seung-yeol	4:01
2.	"Outsider" (Inst.)		Lee Sang-hoon		4:01
Total length:					8:02

== Ratings ==
Watcher : South Korea viewers per episode (millions)

Season	Episode number																Average
Season	1	2	3	4	5	6	7	8	9	10	11	12	13	14	15	16	Average
1	0.814	1.251	0.873	1.113	0.875	1.306	0.915	1.194	0.829	1.204	0.866	1.462	0.994	1.286	1.197	1.602	1.111

Source: Audience measurement performed nationwide by Nielsen Media Research.

Average TV viewership ratings
Ep.	Original broadcast date	Average audience share (Nielsen Korea)	
Ep.	Original broadcast date	Nationwide	Seoul
1	July 6, 2019	2.993%	3.576%
2	July 7, 2019	4.493%	5.306%
3	July 13, 2019	3.665%	4.130%
4	July 14, 2019	4.549%	5.223%
5	July 20, 2019	3.646%	4.071%
6	July 21, 2019	5.405%	6.198%
7	July 27, 2019	3.738%	4.336%
8	July 28, 2019	5.066%	5.687%
9	August 3, 2019	3.348%	3.895%
10	August 4, 2019	5.076%	6.044%
11	August 10, 2019	3.477%	3.797%
12	August 11, 2019	6.094%	6.567%
13	August 17, 2019	4.156%	4.367%
14	August 18, 2019	5.520%	6.029%
15	August 24, 2019	4.960%	5.346%
16	August 25, 2019	6.585%	7.198%
Average		4.548%	5.111%
In the table above, the blue numbers represent the lowest ratings and the red numbers represent the highest ratings.; This series aired on a cable channel/pay TV which normally has a relatively smaller audience compared to free-to-air TV/public broadcasters (KBS, SBS, MBC and EBS).
