= Ji Jin-hee =

South Korean actor

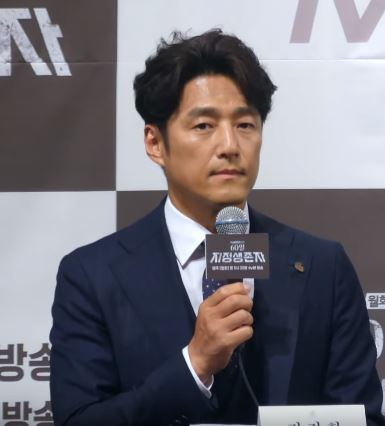
- Ji in July 2019
- Born: June 24, 1971 (age 55); Mapo District, Seoul, South Korea
- Education: Myongji University (Visual Design)
- Occupation: Actor
- Years active: 1999–present
- Agent: Ikkle Entertainment
- Spouse: Lee Su-yon (m. 2004)
- Children: 2

Korean name
- Hangul: 지진희
- Hanja: 池珍熙
- RR: Ji Jinhui
- MR: Chi Chinhŭi

Ji Jin-hee (Korean: 지진희; born June 24, 1971) is a South Korean actor. He is best known for his leading roles in the television shows Jewel in the Palace (2003), He Who Can't Marry (2009), Dong Yi (2010), I Have a Lover (2015), Second to Last Love (2016), Misty (2018) and Designated Survivor: 60 Days (2019).

== Career ==
=== Early career ===
Ji Jin-hee graduated from Myongji University with a degree in graphic design. He was working as a photographer at an advertising agency when Park Seong-hye approached him about pursuing a career in entertainment. Content at his present job and doubtful that he had any acting talent, Ji refused the offers for a year, but finally agreed when the ad agency downsized during the IMF financial crisis and he got laid off.

In 1999, Ji appeared in the music video for Jo Sung-bin's "Like a Third-rate Movie," and he made his acting debut in 2000 with the television drama Female Secretary. In the next few years, he continued his television career with Juliet's Man (2000), Four Sisters (2001), and the Korean-Japanese co-production Afternoon After the Passing Rain (2002) with Ryoko Yonekura.

Ji made his big screen debut in 2002, playing a detective in the thriller H. This was followed by If You Were Me, a human rights-themed omnibus where he starred in Park Kwang-su's short film Face Value.

=== Breakthrough ===
He had drawn positive reviews for his portrayal of a surgeon caught up in a love triangle with a priest in the melodrama Love Letter, but Ji's breakthrough came in late 2003 with period drama Dae Jang Geum (also known as Jewel in the Palace). As a Joseon-era government official who falls in love with a female chef turned royal physician (played by Lee Young-ae), Ji's gentlemanly and integrity-filled character attracted female fans across Asia, for not only did Dae Jang Geum receive high viewership ratings domestically (reaching a peak of 57.8%), it also became popular overseas and became one of the proponents of the Korean Wave.

Ji later parlayed his pan-Asian stardom into roles in the Chinese musical film Perhaps Love and the Taiwanese drama The 100th Bride, both in 2005. He next played an amnesiac in Spring Day, the Korean remake of Japanese drama Hoshi no Kinka ("Heaven's Coins").

Fighting against being typecast in nice roles after Dae Jang Geum, Ji also played a playboy slacker in romantic comedy series Miss Kim's Million Dollar Quest (2004), for which he received his first acting award. And in black comedy Bewitching Attraction (2006), he was cast as a cartoonist who shares a past with a promiscuous professor.

In 2007, Ji starred in Im Sang-soo's The Old Garden, adapted from Hwang Sok-yong's novel about a couple who meet during the turbulent 1980s surrounding the Gwangju Uprising; he played an anti-government activist who gets released from prison after serving 17 years for his political activities. This was followed by Ji's first action film, Yoichi Sai's Soo, in which he played dual roles as a hired killer who avenges the death of his twin brother.

Ji returned to television in 2008, as a veteran news reporter in Spotlight. In 2009, he played a fussy, 40-year-old bachelor architect in He Who Can't Marry, the Korean remake of Japanese drama Kekkon Dekinai Otoko ("The Man Who Can't Get Married"). Ji next appeared in the Korean-Japanese "telecinema" Paradise, which both received a theatrical release and aired on SBS and TV Asahi.

He also published Ji Jin-hee in Italy: A Walk in the Clouds, which featured photos and essays about his travels in Rome, Florence and Milan, as well as Ji's recommendations and tips about wine.

In 2008, Ji signed an exclusive contract with NOA Entertainment. NOA Entertainment is a management company established in October 2007 by former managers of his previous agency Sidus HQ.

In 2010, Ji starred in Parallel Life, playing Korea's youngest ever chief presiding judge, who upon his wife's murder discovers that his life may exactly replicate that of someone who died 30 years ago. He was next cast as a music critic and radio show host who goes in search of his missing spouse in the road trip comedy Looking for My Wife (also known as Runaway from Home).

Then Ji reunited with Dae Jang Geum television director Lee Byung-hoon in another period drama Dong Yi, which also proved popular with audiences. As King Sukjong, who falls for a palace maid (played by Han Hyo-joo) and makes her his royal concubine, Ji said he wanted to show a monarch who had "weak spots that show through his charismatic exterior. Rather than being a dignified king, he is an outgoing and adventurous character."

Ji continued playing leading roles in television, as an airline pilot in Take Care of Us, Captain (2012), general and Joseon dynasty founder Yi Seong-gye in The Great Seer (2012), an adulterous husband in One Warm Word (2013), and a villainous doctor in Blood (2015). He also wrote the original draft of the screenplay of horror-comedy Ghost Sweepers (2012), for which he received a story by credit.

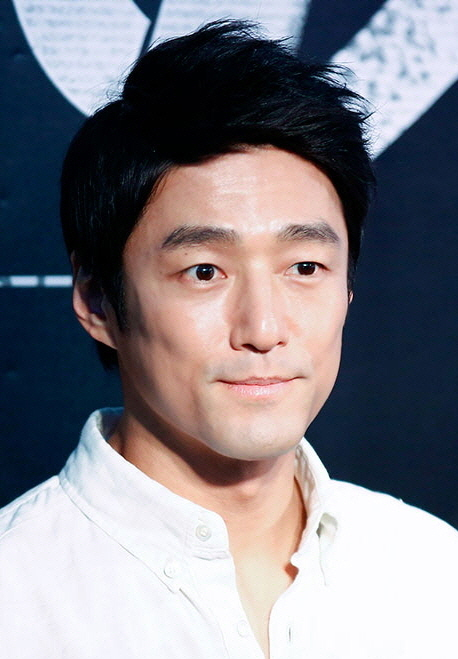
Ji in June 2013

In 2013, Ji signed an exclusive contract with HB Entertainment.

From 2014 to 2015, Ji starred in three Chinese films, namely: On the Way opposite Eva Huang, in which a recently divorced Korean man meets a Chinese woman on a train while traveling in China; Bad Sister opposite Ivy Chen, a romantic comedy where a father who wants to stop his daughter's wedding teams up with the groom's equally disapproving older sister; and Helios, a crime thriller about the theft of nuclear weapons by a group of terrorists.

On April 30, 2019, Ikkle Entertainment announced that Ji signed an exclusive contract with them.

== Personal life ==
Ji Jin-hee married his long-time girlfriend, advertising graphic designer Lee Soo-yeon, at the Central City Millennium Hall in Banpo, Seoul on November 19, 2004, at 5 PM. They first met when Ji Jin-hee was working as an advertising photographer before his acting debut and had been in a relationship for six years. The wedding was attended by 1,500 guests. Their first son was born in 2005. Their second son was born in 2012.

== Philanthropy ==
In 2008, Ji Jin-hee attended a charity event in China (Beijing), where he put his and his wife's wedding rings up at an auction to help the victims of the 2008 Sichuan earthquake.

== Filmography ==
=== Film ===
| Year | Title | Role | Notes |
|---|---|---|---|
| 2002 | H | Detective Kang Tae-hyun | |
| 2003 | If You Were Me | Driver | segment: "Face Value" |
| 2005 | Perhaps Love | Monty | Chinese film |
| 2006 | Bewitching Attraction | Park Seok-gyu | |
| 2007 | The Old Garden | Oh Hyun-woo | |
| 2007 | Soo | Jang Tae-soo | |
| 2007 | Meet Mr. Daddy | Ha Sun-young's husband (cameo) | |
| 2009 | Paradise | Il-ho | telecinema |
| 2010 | Parallel Life | Kim Seok-hyun | |
| 2010 | Looking for My Wife | Ji Sung-hee | |
| 2011 | Thomas & Friends: Misty Island Rescue | The Narrator (Korean dubbed) | animated film |
| 2012 | Love Fiction | Joo-ro | |
| 2012 | Ghost Sweepers | —N/a | story by credit |
| 2014 | On the Way | Park Jun-ho | Chinese film |
| 2014 | Bad Sister | | Chinese film |
| 2015 | Helios | Choi Min-ho | Hong Kong film |
| 2015 | Summer Snow | Myung-hwan | |

=== Television series ===
| Year | Title | Role | Notes | Ref. |
|---|---|---|---|---|
| 2000 | Female Secretary | | | |
| 2000 | MBC Best Theater | | Episode "Beautiful Man" | |
| 2000 | Juliet's Man | Choi Seung-woo | | |
| 2001 | MBC Best Theater | | Episode "Seongju Puri" | |
| 2001 | Four Sisters | Han Tae-suk | | |
| 2002 | Afternoon After the Passing Rain | Hong Dae-jin | Korean-Japanese co-production | |
| 2003 | Love Letter | Jung Woo-jin | | |
| 2003 | MBC Best Theater | | Episode "Our Writing Class" | |
| 2003 | MBC Best Theater | | Episode "Farewell Waltz" | |
| 2003 | Jewel in the Palace | Min Jeong-ho | | |
| 2003 | Hanppyeom Drama | | Episode "What's in Her Refrigerator?" | |
| 2004 | Ms. Kim's Million Dollar Quest | Park Moo-yeol | | |
| 2004 | MBC Best Theater | | Episode "Big Brother Is Back" | |
| 2005 | Spring Days | Go Eun-ho | | |
| 2005 | Hanppyeom Drama | Cafe owner | Episode "Rosy Life" | |
| 2005 | The 100th Bride | Han Wei | Taiwanese drama | |
| 2008 | Spotlight | Oh Tae-suk | | |
| 2008 | Star's Lover | Ma-ri's actor ex-boyfriend | Cameo (episode 8) | |
| 2009 | He Who Can't Marry | Jo Jae-hee | | |
| 2010 | Dong Yi | King Sukjong | | |
| 2012 | Take Care of Us, Captain | Kim Yoon-sung | | |
| 2012 | My Husband Got a Family | Pastor | Cameo (episode 19) | |
| 2012 | The Great Seer | Yi Seong-gye | | |
| 2013 | Dating Agency: Cyrano | Seon Jung-nam | Cameo (episode 1) | |
| 2013 | One Warm Word | Yoo Jae-hak | | |
| 2015 | Blood | Lee Jae-wook | | |
| 2015 | Late Night Restaurant | Young-shik | Cameo (episode 4–5) | |
| 2015 | I Have a Lover | Choi Jin-eon | | |
| 2015 | Snow Lotus Flower | Lee Soo Hyun | One-act play | |
| 2016 | Second to Last Love | Go Sang-sik | | |
| 2018 | Misty | Kang Tae-wook | | |
| 2019 | Designated Survivor: 60 Days | Park Moo-jin | | |
| 2021 | Undercover | Han Jeong-hyeon / Lee Suk-kyu | | |
| 2021 | Move to Heaven | Han Jung-woo | Special appearance | |
| 2021 | The Road: The Tragedy of One | Baek Soo-hyeon | | |
| 2023 | D.P. 2 | Gu Ja-woon | | |
| 2024 | Romance in the House | Byeon Moo-jin | | |
| 2025 | Kick Kick Kick Kick | Ji Jin-hee | | |
| 2025 | Nine Puzzles | Yoon Dong-hoon | Special appearance | |
| 2025 | My Troublesome Star | Wonban | Special appearance | |

=== Variety shows ===
| Year | Title | Role | Ref. |
|---|---|---|---|
| 2018 | Where on Earth?? | Cast member | |
| 2020 | Documentary Insight - Virus War | Presenter | |
| 2021–2022 | Goalvengers | Fixed appearance | |
| 2024 | My Ugly Baby | Special MC | |

=== Music video appearances ===
| Year | Song title | Artist |
|---|---|---|
| 1999 | "Like a Third-rate Movie" | Jo Sung-bin |
| 2000 | "Once Upon a Day" | Kim Bum-soo |
| 2001 | "Never" | Jo Sung-mo |

=== Narration ===
| Year | Title | Role | Ref. |
|---|---|---|---|
| 2006 | SBS Kia Experience 24 Hours 10th Anniversary | | |
| 2010 | KBS Special "Korean Success DNA" | | |
| 2011 | Hundertwasser Korea Special Exhibition | audioguide | |
| 2011 | Thomas & Friends - The Movie 3 | animated movie | |
| 2015 | EBS Liberation 70th Anniversary Special Documentary "Great Legacy" | | |
| 2015 | MBC 54th Anniversary Special UHD Documentary "A Thousand Faces, Makeup" | | |
| 2017 | The Art of the Brick Exhibition | audioguide | |
| 2018 | National Museum of Modern and Contemporary Art 'Yun Hyung-keun' Exhibition | audioguide | |
| 2019 | KBS Liberation Day Special Documentary "Sakhalin, Liberation Never Came" | | |
| 2019 | KBS Documentary Insight "Basic Science Changes the World" | | |
| 2020 | EBS Documentary Prime Educational Project 10-part series "Again, School" | | |

== Discography ==
| Year | Title | Artist | Notes |
|---|---|---|---|
| 2002 | "Maria's Bath" | Cho Seung-woo, Yum Jung-ah, Ji Jin-hee | H OST |
| 2005 | "The Pain and Even the Sadness" | Ji Jin-hee | track 5 from Spring Day OST |
| 2005 | "Fate" | Jacky Cheung, Ji Jin-hee | tracks 2, 3, 6 from Perhaps Love OST |
| 2005 | "Life's Montage" | Ji Jin-hee | tracks 2, 3, 6 from Perhaps Love OST |
| 2005 | "A Beautiful Story" | Ji Jin-hee, Takeshi Kaneshiro | tracks 2, 3, 6 from Perhaps Love OST |
| 2009 | "Difficult to Love You" | Ji Jin-hee | track 4 from He Who Can't Marry OST |
| 2010 | "We" | Jang Dong-gun, Kim Seung-woo, Hwang Jung-min, Ji Jin-hee; Gong Hyung-jin, Lee Ha-na | Actors Choice single |
| 2010 | "In Life We Are Alone" | Ji Jin-hee | track 3 of Looking for My Wife OST |

== Bibliography ==
| Year | Title | Publisher | ISBN |
|---|---|---|---|
| 2009 | Ji Jin-hee in Italy: A Walk in the Clouds | Seed Paper | ISBN 9788996187615 |

== Awards and nominations ==
Year presented, Name of the award ceremony, category, nominated work, and the result of the nomination
| Year | Award | Category | Nominated work | Result |
|---|---|---|---|---|
| 2003 | MBC Drama Awards | Excellence Award, Actor | Love Letter, Dae Jang Geum | Nominated |
| 2004 | SBS Drama Awards | Excellence Award, Actor in a Drama Special | Miss Kim's Million Dollar Quest | Won |
| 2009 | KBS Drama Awards | Top Excellence Award, Actor | He Who Can't Marry | Nominated |
| 2009 | KBS Drama Awards | Excellence Award, Actor in a Miniseries | He Who Can't Marry | Won |
| 2010 | MBC Drama Awards | Top Excellence Award, Actor | Dong Yi | Won |
| 2010 | MBC Drama Awards | Popularity Award, Actor | Dong Yi | Nominated |
| 2010 | MBC Drama Awards | Best Couple Award with Han Hyo-joo | Dong Yi | Nominated |
| 2011 | Hong Kong Cable TV Awards | Best Actor | Dong Yi | Won |
| 2011 | CETV Awards | Top 10 Hottest Asia Award | Dong Yi | Won |
| 2012 | SBS Drama Awards | Top Excellence Award, Actor in a Drama Special | The Great Seer | Nominated |
| 2012 | SBS Drama Awards | Netizen Popularity Award, Actor | The Great Seer | Nominated |
| 2014 | SBS Drama Awards | Excellence Award, Actor in a Drama Special | One Warm Word | Nominated |
| 2015 | 4th APAN Star Awards | Top Excellence Award, Actor in a Serial Drama | I Have a Lover | Nominated |
| 2015 | KBS Drama Awards | Excellence Award, Actor in a Mid-length Drama | Blood | Nominated |
| 2015 | SBS Drama Awards | Top Excellence Award, Actor in a Serial Drama | I Have a Lover | Nominated |
| 2015 | SBS Drama Awards | Best Couple Award with Kim Hyun-joo | I Have a Lover | Won |
| 2015 | SBS Drama Awards | Top 10 Star Award | I Have a Lover | Won |
| 2016 | SBS Drama Awards | Excellence Award, Actor in a Romantic-Comedy Drama | Second to Last Love | Nominated |
