= I Have a Lover =

2015 South Korean television series

- Promotional poster
- Also known as: I'm Taken; Identical Affairs; Sweetheart
- Genre: Melodrama; Romance
- Written by: Bae Yoo-mi
- Directed by: Choi Mun-seok
- Starring: Kim Hyun-joo; Ji Jin-hee; Park Han-byul; Lee Kyu-han
- Music by: Jeon Chang-yeob
- Country of origin: South Korea
- Original language: Korean
- No. of episodes: 50

Production
- Running time: 70 minutes
- Production company: iWill Media

Original release
- Network: SBS TV
- Release: August 22, 2015 – February 28, 2016

I Have a Lover (Korean: 애인 있어요; RR: Aein isseoyo) is a 2015–2016 South Korean television series starring Kim Hyun-joo, Ji Jin-hee, Park Han-byul and Lee Kyu-han. It aired on SBS's Saturdays and Sundays at 22:00 (KST) from August 22, 2015, to February 28, 2016, for 50 episodes. Kim Hyun-joo and Ji Jin-hee previously starred together in Miss Kim's Million Dollar Quest (2004).

== Plot ==
The ambitious and successful lawyer Do Hae-gang (Kim Hyun-joo) and her husband, Choi Jin-eon (Ji Jin-hee) have a dysfunctional relationship. They lose their child and Jin-eon starts an affair with a much younger girl, Seol-ri (Park Han-byul). Dokgo Yong-gi is Do Hae-gang's unknown twin sister. After the couple divorce, Hae-gang gets into a mysterious car accident and loses her memory. Baek Seok (Lee Kyu-han), mistaking Hae-gang as Yong-gi, saves Hae-gang and makes her live as Yong-gi. Hae-gang becomes Baek-seok's fiancé and lives with his family. What will happen when Jin-eon and Hae-gang meet again? Will the couple be able to go back to how they used to be before?

== Cast ==
=== Main characters ===
- Kim Hyun-joo as Do Hae-gang (Birth Name: Dokgo On-gi) / Dokgo Yong-gi
- Ji Jin-hee as Choi Jin-eon
- Park Han-byul as Kang Seol-ri
- Lee Kyu-han as Baek Seok

=== Supporting characters ===
Choi Jin-eon's family

- Dokgo Young-jae as Choi man-ho, Jin-eon's father
- Na Young-hee as Hong Se-hee, Jin-eon's mother
- Baek Ji-won as Choi Jin-li, Jin-eon's half-sister
- Gong Hyung-jin as Min Tae-seok, Jin-li's husband

Dokgo Yong-gi / Do Hae-gang sisters' family

- Kim Chung as Kim Kyu-nam, the sisters' mother
- Kang Boo-ja as Nam Cho-rok, Yong-gi's grandmother
- Kim Ha-yoo as Dokgo Woo-joo, Yong-gi's daughter, alias Zhang Ling

Baek Seok's family

- Choi Jung-woo as Baek Jun-sang, Baek Seok's father
- Seo Ji-hee as Baek Ji
  - Park Ha-young as young Baek Ji
- Seo Dong-hyun as Baek Hyun
- Shin Soo-yeon as Baek Jo
  - Lee Chae-mi as young Baek Jo
- Kim Do-yeop as Baek Bum
- Ahn Jung-woo as Baek Jun

Extended cast

- Lee Jae-yoon as Min Kyu-suk, Tae-seok's brother
- Seo Dong-won as Go Hyun-woo, Jin-eon's friend
- Lee Seung-hyung as Kim Tae Ho, Tae-seok's right-hand man
- Jang Won-young as Manager Byun Gang-seok, Yong-gi's direct supervisor
- Kim Bo-jung as Song Mi-ae, Yong-gi's colleague/friend
- Kang Seo-jun as Yong-gi's colleague
- Lee Jae-woo as Kim Sun-yong, Yong-gi's fiancée
- Lee Sang-hoon as guy ordered by Tae-seok to follow Yong-gi
- Lee Si-won as Lee Hae Joo, Teracop case plaintiff
- Hwang Min-ho as Lee Hae Joo's husband
- Han Dong-hwan as Lee Hae Joo's attorney
- Kim Ho-chang
- Lee Ji-yeon
- Seo Bo-ik
- Ahn Sung-gun
- Kang Jun-seok
- Kim Yong-wan
- Jo Ha-lin
- Park Jung-min
- Lee Won-jang
- Han Yeol

== Original soundtrack ==
=== Part 1 ===
No.	Title	Artist	Length
1.	"우리 두 사람" (The Two of Us)	이은미 (Lee Eun Mi)	4:47
2.	"우리 두 사람 (inst.)" (The Two of Us)	이은미 (Lee Eun Mi)	4:47

=== Part 2 ===
No.	Title	Artist	Length
1.	"세월" (Years)	류 (Ryu)	4:26
2.	"세월 (inst.)" (Years)	류 (Ryu)	4:26

=== Part 3 ===
No.	Title	Artist	Length
1.	"사랑하고 사랑해도"	류 (Ryu)	4:36

== Awards and nominations ==
Year	Award	Category	Recipient	Result
2015	4th APAN Star Awards	Top Excellence Award, Actor in a Serial Drama	Ji Jin-hee	Nominated
2015	4th APAN Star Awards	Top Excellence Award, Actress in a Serial Drama	Kim Hyun-joo	Won
2015	23rd SBS Drama Awards	Top Excellence Award, Actor in a Serial Drama	Ji Jin-hee	Nominated
2015	23rd SBS Drama Awards	Top Excellence Award, Actress in a Serial Drama	Kim Hyun-joo	Won
2015	23rd SBS Drama Awards	Excellence Award, Actor in a Serial Drama	Lee Kyu-han	Nominated
2015	23rd SBS Drama Awards	Special Acting Award, Actress in a Serial Drama	Park Han-byul	Won
2015	23rd SBS Drama Awards	Special Acting Award, Actress in a Serial Drama	Baek Ji-won	Nominated
2015	23rd SBS Drama Awards	Netizen Popularity Award	Kim Hyun-joo	Won
2015	23rd SBS Drama Awards	Best Couple	Ji Jin-hee & Kim Hyun-joo	Won
2015	23rd SBS Drama Awards	Top 10 Stars	Kim Hyun-joo	Won
2015	23rd SBS Drama Awards	Top 10 Stars	Ji Jin-hee	Won
2016	52nd Baeksang Arts Awards	Best Actress (TV)	Kim Hyun-joo	Nominated
2016	9th Korea Drama Awards	Top Excellence Award, Actress	Kim Hyun-joo	Nominated

== Notes ==
- Episodes 11 and 12 were postponed due to the airing Chuseok special broadcast. Episode 11 was aired on 3 October 2015, and episode 12 was aired on 4 October 2015.
- The broadcast of episode 22 scheduled on 8 November 2015 was cancelled due to the baseball match.
- The broadcast of episode 23 scheduled on 15 November 2015 was cancelled due to the baseball match.
- Episode 23 broadcast on 21 November 2015 was delayed by almost 50 minute due to a baseball game.
- The broadcast of episode 34 scheduled on 27 December 2015 was cancelled due to the SBS Gayo Daejun.
- The broadcast of episode 38 scheduled on 16 January 2016 was cancelled due to the SBS Sports 2016 Olympic qualifier game between South Korea and Yemen.
