= Kang Eun-kyung =

South Korean television screenwriter (born 1971)

- Born: July 25, 1971 (age 54); South Korea
- Occupation: Screenwriter
- Years active: 1998–present
- Employer: Gleline
- Agent(s): CAMP ENT; Story & Pictures Media

Korean name
- Hangul: 강은경
- RR: Gang Eungyeong
- MR: Kang Ŭn'gyŏng

Kang Eun-kyung (born July 25, 1971) is a South Korean television screenwriter. She is best known for writing hit drama Bread, Love and Dreams (also known as King of Baking, Kim Takgu), which reached a peak rating of 50.8% in 2010.

Aside from writing scripts, she also does creative duties for dramas through the drama creative group company Gleline (글Line), which she founded in 2015. As of 2022, Gleline currently operates as a subsidiary of Kakao Entertainment.

== Filmography ==
=== As writer ===
- Gyeongseong Creature (Seasons 1–2; Netflix, 2023–2024)
- Where Stars Land (SBS, 2018)
- Dr. Romantic (Seasons 1–3; SBS, 2016–2023)
- What Happens to My Family? (KBS2, 2014)
- Gu Family Book (MBC, 2013)
- Glory Jane (KBS2, 2011)
- Bread, Love and Dreams (KBS2, 2010)
- Formidable Rivals (KBS2, 2008)
- Bichunmoo (GDTV, 2006 / SBS, 2008)
- Dal-ja's Spring (KBS2, 2007)
- Hello God (KBS2, 2006)
- Oh Feel Young (KBS2, 2004)
- Good Person (MBC, 2003)
- Glass Slippers (SBS, 2002)
- Hotelier (MBC, 2001)
- Third Coincidence (MBC, 2001)
- Ghost (SBS, 1999)
- Sunday Best "Eun Bi-ryung" (KBS2, 1999)
- White Nights 3.98 (SBS, 1998)

=== As creator ===
- My Horrible Boss (JTBC, 2016)
- Revolutionary Love (tvN, 2017)
- Misty (JTBC, 2018)
- Forecasting Love and Weather (JTBC, 2022)
- Now, We Are Breaking Up (SBS, 2021)
- The World of the Married (JTBC, 2020)
- The Wonderfools (Netflix, 2026)
- Gold Digger (JTBC, 2026)

== Awards ==
- 2014 KBS Drama Awards: Best Writer (What's With This Family)
- 2011 2nd Seoul Arts and Culture Awards: Best Drama Writer (Bread, Love and Dreams)
- 2010 KBS Drama Awards: Best Writer (Bread, Love and Dreams)
- 2010 Korea Content Awards: Prime Minister's Award in the Field of Broadcasting (Bread, Love and Dreams)
- 2010 Korean TV and Radio Writers Association: Best Writer (Bread, Love and Dreams)
- 2010 3rd Korea Drama Awards: Best Writer (Bread, Love and Dreams)
