= Yang Hee-kyung =

South Korean actress (born 1954)

Yang Hee kyung
- Born: December 3, 1954 (age 71); Seoul, South Korea
- Education: Seoul College of Art - Theater
- Occupation: Actress
- Years active: 1975–present

Korean name
- Hangul: 양희경
- Hanja: 楊姬瓊
- RR: Yang Huigyeong
- MR: Yang Hŭigyŏng

Yang Hee-kyung (Korean: 양희경; born December 3, 1954) is a South Korean actress.

== Filmography ==
=== Television series ===
Year	Title	Role
1985	Tiger Teacher	
1990	Bizarre Family, Bizarre School	
1991	What Is Love	Hee-kyung
1992	Promise	
1993	Unstoppable Love	
1993	Mountain Wind	
1994	Daughters of a Rich Family	Kwon Ok-ja
1994	Partner	
1995	Men of the Bath House	Kim Bok-hee
1997	Women	
1998	Lie	Seon-joo
1998	Run Barefoot	
1999	Did We Really Love?	Jung In-sook
1999	The Last War	
1999	I'm Still Loving You	
1999	You Don't Know My Mind	Yang Bong-soon
2000	School 3	Yang Hee-jung
2000	The Aspen Tree	
2001	Like Father, Unlike Son	Yoo Myung-ja
2001	More Than Words Can Say	Park Soon-ja
2002	Since We Met	Hong Ae-kyung
2002	Girls' School	Hong Seok-rae
2003	Over the Green Fields	Na Jung-ran
2003	Love Letter	Maria
2003	Sang Doo! Let's Go to School	Lonely lady
2003	Long Live Love	Kim Pyeong-hee
2004	The Autumn of Major General Hong	Hong Geum-sil
2005	Take My Hand	Teacher Yang
2005	Be Strong, Geum-soon!	Ahn Soon-ji
2005	Super Rookie	Madam Yang
2006	My Beloved Sister	Kim Geon-woo's aunt
2006	Here Comes Ajumma	Shin Su-ja
2007	Dal-ja's Spring	Team leader Kang
2007	Behind the White Tower	Hong Sung-hee
2008	One Mom and Three Dads	Hwang Soon-ja
2008	Chunja's Special Day	Park Sam-sook
2008	My Life's Golden Age	Yoo Kyung-ja
2008	Star's Lover	Lee Seung-yeon
2009	The Road Home	Sook-ja
2009	Two Wives	
2009	Tamra, the Island	Mr. Eom's wife
2009	Creating Destiny	Park Geum-ja
2010	OB & GY	Seo Hye-young's mother
2010	Prosecutor Princess	Park Ae-ja
2010	The President	Choi Jung-im
2011	War of the Roses	So Young-ja
2011	My Bittersweet Life	Heo In-ae
2011	Birdie Buddy	Uhm Jung-ran
2011	KBS Drama Special "Terminal"	Shin-ja
2011	What's Up?	Oh Doo-ri's mother
2012	Daddy's Sorry	Soon-joo
2012	My Husband Got a Family	Uhm Soon-ae
2012	Miss Panda and Mr. Hedgehog	Kim Kap-soon
2012	The Birth of a Family	Oh Young-ja
2013	My Kids Give Me a Headache	Lee Young-hyun's aunt (guest appearance)
2013	Secret Love	Park Kye-ok
2013	Thrice Married Woman	Yoo Min-sook
2014	Cunning Single Lady	Restaurant ajumma (guest appearance)
2014	A Witch's Love	Choi Jung-sook
2014	What Happens to My Family?	Cha Soon-geum
2015	My Heart Twinkle Twinkle	Restaurant owner Gong
2015	Who Are You: School 2015	Park Min-kyung
2015	High Society	Lee Min-sook
2015	The Great Wives	Kim Bong-soon
2018	Goodbye to Goodbye	Kim Ok-ja
2019–2020	Unasked Family	Wang Kkon-Nib
2021	Secret Royal Inspector & Joy	Madam Jo
2022	Our Blues	Ms. Jang
2022	If You Wish Upon Me	Yeom Soon-ja
2022	Love Is for Suckers	Yoon Young-hee

=== Film ===
Year	Title	Role
1987	Just Once	
1993	That Woman, That Man	Mal-ja
1994	Out to the World	Gas station attendant
1995	The Hair Dresser	Yang Hye-kyung
1995	Man?	Mother playing poker
1996	The River Flows to Tomorrow	Jong-ki's mother
1996	Corset	Hae-joo
2000	Peppermint Candy	Radio DJ (voice)
2007	Scout	Dong-yeol's mother
2008	Sweet Lie	Park Dong-sik's mother
2011	Sunny	Kim Jang-mi's mother (cameo)
2013	Boomerang Family	Jung-hyun's woman (cameo)

== Theater ==
Year	Title	Role
1985	The Chronicles of Han	
1995	An Old Prostitute's Song	
2001	Nunsense	Sister Mary Hubert
2005	An Old Prostitute's Song	
2008	Minja's Golden Age	Park Min-ja/Heo Chun-ha
2010	Pimatgol Sonata	Haeng-mae
2010	Nunsensations	Mother Superior
2011	How Far Have You Come?	Yang Hee-eun's younger sister
2011	Pimatgol Sonata	Haeng-mae
2013	Sooni's Uncle	
2013	The Sound of Music	Mother Abbess

== Discography ==
=== Studio album ===
Album information	Track listing
웃음진 그 날이 올때까지: Album; Released: June 1, 1991; Label: Samhwa Records	Track listing: 1. 해지는 소리; 2. 외사랑; 3. 들녘; 4. 새벽꿈; 5. 어떤 가을; 6. 화장을 한뒤부터; 7. 그늘진 사랑; 8. 오늘만 넘기면; 9. 그랬으면 좋겠네; 10. 거룩한 밤

== Awards and nominations ==
Year	Award	Category	Nominated work	Result
1995	19th Seoul Theater Festival	Best Actress	An Old Prostitute's Song	Won
2000	KBS Drama Awards	Best Supporting Actress	School 3	Won
2014	KBS Drama Awards	Excellence Award, Actress in a Serial Drama	What Happens to My Family?	Nominated
