= Shinsukki Blues =

- Theatrical poster
- Hangul: 신석기 블루스
- RR: Sinseokgi beulluseu
- MR: Sinsŏkki pŭllusŭ
- Directed by: Kim Do-hyuk
- Produced by: Han Sung-goo
- Starring: Lee Sung-jae; Lee Jong-hyuk; Shin Yi; Kim Hyun-joo
- Cinematography: Mun Yong-sik
- Edited by: Nam Na-yeong
- Music by: Cho Sung-woo
- Release date: December 30, 2004
- Running time: 109 minutes
- Country: South Korea
- Language: Korean

Shinsukki Blues (Korean: 신석기 블루스) is a 2004 South Korean film about a smarmy corporate lawyer who magically switches bodies with a pro bono defense attorney with the same name. It was the last Korean film released to theaters in 2004.
