= Glass Slippers =

- Also known as: Glass Shoes
- Genre: Romance, Melodrama
- Written by: Kang Eun-kyung
- Directed by: Choi Yoon-seok
- Starring: Kim Hyun-joo; Kim Ji-ho; Han Jae-suk; So Ji-sub
- Country of origin: South Korea
- Original language: Korean
- No. of episodes: 40

Production
- Running time: 60 minutes
- Production company: Kim Jong-hak Production

Original release
- Network: SBS
- Release: 2 March – 28 July 2002

Glass Slippers (Korean: 유리구두; RR: Yurigudu) is a 40-episode South Korean drama series that aired on SBS in 2002, starring Kim Hyun-joo and Kim Ji-ho as two orphaned sisters.

== Plot ==
6-year-old Yoon-hee and her elder sister, Tae-hee, were raised by their widowed father after their mother died giving birth to Yoon-hee. Following years of struggles, their father — who was already suffering from cancer — is killed in a car accident, leaving the girls with no choice but to find their rich paternal grandfather, who lost touch with them due to his disapproval of their mother. At the train station, they are robbed by a group of gangsters. While chasing them, Tae-hee does not notice that Yoon-hee, who is following her, gets knocked unconscious by the Oh family's truck. Tae-hee gets beaten by the gangsters and is helped by a boy named Jae-hyuk, who stays with her until they both find her grandfather. They look for Yoon-hee in despair, unaware that she has lost her memories after regaining consciousness, and has moved away with the Ohs. Based on the name carved on her mother's ring, Yoon-hee assumes that her name is Sun-woo, and uses it as her identity.

15 years later, Tae-hee works at her grandfather's company, and is romantically involved with her childhood crush and co-worker, Jae-hyuk (unbeknownst to Tae-hee, this is Jae-hyuk's revenge plan for her grandfather, who had indirectly caused his grandfather's death years ago). In contrast, Sun-woo grows up in the Oh family and often gets abused (especially by Seung-hee). She almost gets raped by Seung-hee's stepfather, and thus gets kicked out of the house by his wife. Seung-hee's crush, Chul-woong, desires Sun-woo, so he lets her take refuge at his home. Tae-hee, not giving up on finding her sister, tracks down the Oh's address and confronts Seung-hee upon seeing her wearing Sun-woo's ring. Quickly learning that Sun-woo is Tae-hee's long-lost sister, Seung-hee (out of jealousy and greed) pretends to be Yoon-hee, and moves in with the Kim's family. Tae-hee seems happy while her grandfather remains suspicious of Seung-hee. He overhears Seung-hee's phone conversation with her mother, and right away exposes her deceptive plan. However, Seung-hee lies that the real Yoon-hee's fate is unknown, not saying a word about Sun-woo. He is devastated and thus decides to keep the truth from Tae-hee.

Coincidentally, Sun-woo gets a job in her grandfather's company and frequently interacts with Tae-hee and her grandfather. They are fond of Sun-woo until Jae-hyuk becomes so in love with her, which breaks Tae-hee's heart. He aborts his revenge plan in order to run away with Sun-woo, but the grandfather soon finds out, and sends him to prison for a few days before Tae-hee bails him out. Unable to forgive Tae-hee's grandfather, Jae-hyuk ends his relationship with Sun-woo and becomes engaged to Tae-hee. Sun-woo moves out on her own and subsequently becomes ill. She is diagnosed with leukemia, which can be cured only if her sibling or relative donates suitable bone marrow. As Sun-woo cannot remember any of them, she is ready to give up and spend her remaining time with Chul-woong. In the meantime, Tae-hee's grandfather assigns his chauffeur, who is Chul-woong's father, to find his real granddaughter. Being told the truth by Seung-hee's stepfather, Chul-woong's father informs him that his missing granddaughter is indeed Sun-woo, who recently got fired by him for the sake of Tae-hee and Jae-hyuk. In shock and regret, he rushes to see Sun-woo before a car accident kills him, and puts Chul-woong's father in a coma. Seung-hee bribes her stepfather to keep Sun-woo's identity a secret, which makes him (and his wife) feel bad for Sun-woo. Jae-hyuk, who has never stopped loving Sun-woo, secretly covers her hospital bills while looking for evidence to expose Seung-hee. By chance, he meets Seung-hee's stepfather and the truth about her is revealed, which he tells Tae-hee about right away. At this point, Sun-woo dreams about her father and her family's past moments. She wakes up as soon as Tae-hee arrives, and the sisters share a long hug upon reunion. After she kicks Seung-hee out of the house, Tae-hee donates her bone marrow for surgery to save Sun-woo. Sun-woo forgives the Ohs, but Seung-hee still holds a grudge against her.

Sun-woo recovers well from the surgery. Jae-hyuk maintains a good relationship with Tae-hee, while trying to get back with Sun-woo. Understanding her sister's feelings, Sun-woo rejects Jae-hyuk and accepts Chul-woong's marriage proposal. Before their wedding, Seung-hee orders a gang to kidnap Sun-woo. In order to protect her, Chul-woong fights against them and gets stabbed, thus dying in Sun-woo's arms and tears. Seung-hee is put to prison and still blames Sun-woo for having stolen her entire life from her. As Jae-hyuk prepares to take a flight to the U.S., Sun-woo suddenly shows up at the airport and they share a brief farewell moment. Sun-woo and Tae-hee return to the house where they lived as children.

== Cast ==
- Kim Hyun-joo as Kim Yoon-hee/Lee Sun-woo
  - Ha Seung-ri as young Yoon-hee
- Kim Ji-ho as Kim Tae-hee, Yoon-hee/Sun-woo's elder sister
  - Yoo Hae-won as young Tae-hee
- Han Jae-suk as Jang Jae-hyuk, Tae-hee's childhood crush and fiancé, Sun-woo's lover
  - Choi Woo-hyuk as young Jae-hyuk
- So Ji-sub as Park Chul-woong, Seung-hee's crush, Sun-woo's admirer and later fiancé
- Kim Gyu-ri (Note: Credited as Kim Min-sun.) as Woo Seung-hee, the main villain
  - Park Eun-bin as young Seung-hee
- Kim Jung-hwa as Park Yeon-woong, Chul-woong's younger sister
- Baek Il-seob as Chairman Kim Pil-joong, Yoon-hee/Sun-woo and Tae-hee's grandfather
- Ha Jae-young as Kim Hyun-ho, Yoon-hee/Sun-woo and Tae Hee's father
- Kim Chung-ryeol as Yeon Seo-jeon, Yoon-hee/Sun-woo and Tae-hee's cousin
  - Shin Tae-hoon as young Seo-joon
- Lee Hee-do as Hwang Kuk-do, Seung-hee's stepfather
- Song Ok-sook as Oh Kim-sun, Seung-hee's mother
- Kim Chung as Seo-joon's mother
- Hyun Suk as Park Kwi-joong, Chairman Kim's chauffeur
- Son Young-joon as Oh Han-young, Jae-hyuk's assistant
- Lee Ki-young as Lee In-soo, Gangster leader
- Sung Dong-il as Mr. Can, Gangster leader's assistant
- Kim Hyung-jong as Soo-tak
- Seo Hyun-ki

== Original soundtrack ==
CD 1:

1. 너의게로 가는 길– Kim Ji-woo
2. 고백 할게– Jia
3. 너를 지켜줄거야– Lee Jong-won (CAN)
4. For Your Love – Jang Hye-jin
5. Help Me Love – Park Wan-kyu
6. 비상지아– Park Wan-kyu
7. Gloomy Sunday – Jeon Seung-woo & Park Chae-won
8. 서툰 고백 – Kim Jin-woo
9. 제발.. – Kim Jin-woo
10. 너를 지켜줄거야 (Piano Version)
11. 문 길 (Guitar Version)
12. Tears (Piano Version)
13. 빈들에서 (Piano Version)
14. 너를 보낸 새벽 (Chorus Version)
15. 별 헤는 밤 (Harmonica Version)

CD 2:

1. 너와 함께 (Piano Version)
2. 약속 (Piano & Guitar Version)
3. 파란미소 (Guitar Version)
4. 내안의 너 (Guitar Version)
5. 도시의 아침 (Piano Version)
6. 어린 시절 (Piano Version)
7. 먼 길 (Piano Version)
8. Tears (Guitar Version)
9. 너를 지켜줄꺼야 (Violin Version)
10. 너와 함께 (Guitar Version)
11. 약속 (Piano Version)
12. 별 헤는 밤 (Piano Version)
13. 빈들에서 (Guitar Version)
14. 어린 시절 (Piano Version)
15. 새로운 시작 (Guitar Version)
16. Tears (Guitar Version)
17. 파란미소 (Harmonica Version)
18. 새로운 시작 (E.Guitar Version)
19. 어린 시절 (Guitar Version)

== Remake ==
In 2016 filmed remake "Threads of Destiny" studio FILM.UA quality rating Kinopoisk 7.084 out of 10.

== See also ==
- List of South Korean television series
- Culture of South Korea
