= Marrying a Millionaire =

2005–2006 South Korean television series

- Promotional poster
- Also known as: To Marry a Millionaire; Millionaire is My Lover
- Hangul: 백만장자와 결혼하기
- Hanja: 百萬장자와 結婚하기
- RR: Baengmanjangjawa gyeolhonhagi
- MR: Paengmanjangjawa kyŏrhonhagi
- Genre: Drama; Romance; Comedy
- Created by: SBS
- Written by: Kim Yi-young
- Directed by: Kang Shin-hyo
- Starring: Kim Hyun-joo; Go Soo; Yoon Sang-hyun; Son Tae-young
- Country of origin: South Korea
- No. of episodes: 16

Production
- Executive producers: Ahn Je-hyung; Moon Bo-mi
- Producer: Kim Young-sup
- Production companies: YEG Filmbook; Tube Media

Original release
- Network: SBS
- Release: November 26, 2005 – January 22, 2006

Marrying a Millionaire (Korean: 백만장자와 결혼하기) is a South Korean television series that aired on SBS from November 26, 2005 to January 22, 2006.

== Storyline ==
One day, PD Yoo Jin-ha is asked to take over the project Marry a Millionaire. Reluctantly, he agrees to handle the project. His search begins with the perfect man to play the "millionaire". His goal is to use a man who is an average worker, but can pull off the facade of a millionaire. Kim Young-hoon is that man. Although he works hard for a living, there are many who can easily mistake him for a rich guy.

By chance, Eun-young is selected to be a participant in the TV show. Although the women are not supposed to know that this millionaire of theirs is just a regular worker, Eun-young knows his true identity, as Young-hoon was her first love. After many years, they meet up again at a party. Although she does not recognize him at first, she realizes he is the young boy she had fallen in love with back in middle school. Although she says she made a mistake in liking him, being in the show with him brings up warm feelings once again.

== Cast ==
- Kim Hyun-joo as Han Eun-young
- Go Soo as Kim Young-hoon
  - Kim Ki-bum as young Kim Young-hoon
- Yoon Sang-hyun as Yoo Jin-ha
- Son Tae-young as Jung Soo-min
- Jung Jin as Jung Sung-sik
- Lee Mi-young as Goo Jung-sun (Eun-young's stepmother)
- Yoo Chae-yeong as Lee Soo-ji (Eun-young's stepsister)
- Park Geun-hyung as Kim Jung-dae (Young-hoon's father)
- Choi Sung-min as Kim Seung-hoon (Young-hoon's older brother)
- Seo Jun-young as Kim Tae-hoon (Young-hoon's younger brother)
- Kim Hee-jung as Jang Soo-ok
