= Kim Hyun-joo =

South Korean actress (born 1977)

- Kim at the 2026 Busan International Film Festival
- Born: April 24, 1977 (age 49); Goyang, Gyeonggi Province, South Korea
- Education: Dankook University
- Occupation: Actress
- Years active: 1996–present
- Agent: Management Seeseon

Korean name
- Hangul: 김현주
- RR: Gim Hyeonju
- MR: Kim Hyŏnju
- Website: ynkent.com

Kim Hyun-joo (Korean: 김현주; born April 24, 1977) is a South Korean actress. She is best known for her leading roles in the television dramas Glass Slippers (2002), Toji, the Land (2004), Twinkle Twinkle (2011), What Happens to My Family? (2014), I Have a Lover (2015), Watcher (2019), and Hellbound (2021–present).

== Career ==
=== 1996–2001: Early acting credits ===
Kim Hyun-joo began modeling in teen magazines when she was in her third year of high school. In 1996, she made her entertainment debut when she starred in the music video for Kim Hyun-chul's "One's Lifetime". Kim launched her acting career in 1997 in the television drama The Reason I Live (1997). Despite being inexperienced, she was cast in the leading role in the film If It Snows on Christmas (1998) with Park Yong-ha, followed by Calla (1999) with Song Seung-heon.

After doing a few sitcoms, Kim built her resume further by playing supporting roles on television. In 1999, She gained her first major role when she appeared in the Jang Dong-gun show Springtime (also known as Youth), which received low ratings. But the popular Into the Sunlight later that year boosted Kim's career. In early 2000, she appeared in episode 7 of Song Ji-na's omnibus drama Love Story, titled "Insomnia, Manual and Orange Juice". Kim then landed her first TV leading role in Virtue (Deok-yi), followed by more supporting roles in 2001 with Her House (headlined by Kim Nam-joo) and the historical drama Sangdo (based on Choi In-ho's novel about Joseon merchant Im Sang-ok).

=== 2002–2005: Glass Slippers breakthrough ===
Kim achieved mainstream stardom in 2002, with her Cinderella-esque leading role in Glass Slippers, about two sisters who were separated as children and unknowingly encounter each other as adults. Also starring Kim Ji-ho, Han Jae-suk and So Ji-sub, the drama was a hit with ratings of over 30%, and Kim received acting and popularity awards at the SBS Drama Awards. Glass Slippers was also successful in China, Taiwan, Hong Kong, and Vietnam and with Kim's new pan-Asian popularity, she starred opposite Taiwanese actor/singer Vanness Wu in the martial arts movie Star Runner (2003).

For Ms. Kim's Million Dollar Quest (also known as Miss Kim's One Billion Won Project and Miss Kim's Adventures in Making a Million), she and Ji Jin-hee displayed their comedic chops as a girl left at the altar and a bankrupt playboy, respectively, who join forces in a moneymaking scheme. Kim's next role was as Lee Sung-jae's love interest in the body swapping comedy film Shinsukki Blues.

From late 2004 to 2005, Kim played the heroine Choi Seo-hee in Toji, the Land, a television adaptation of Park Kyung-ni's celebrated novel Toji ("The Land"), which portrayed the lives and loves of peasants and the nobility ("yangban") in Korea at the turn of the 20th century, spanning from Japan's colonial rule to the division of the peninsula. The big-budget production was a hit, and Kim received a Best TV Actress nomination at the 2006 Baeksang Arts Awards.

Inspired by the American TV show Joe Millionaire, Marrying a Millionaire (2005) was about an average guy (Go Soo) pretending to be rich as the concept for a dating reality show, who then genuinely falls for one of the contestants (Kim), the only girl who knows the truth. After Marrying a, Millionaire, Kim went on a two-year hiatus. She later said she took a break because she hated being typecast in such sweet, wholesome roles. But as time passed, she said she regretted the decision and should've worked harder instead to develop as an actress.

=== 2007–2010: Resurgence ===
Kim returned to television in 2007 with In-soon Is Pretty, playing the titular character who went to prison for unintentionally killing someone in high school, and after serving her sentence, must face prejudice as an ex-con while rebuilding her life. Despite the drama's low ratings, Kim was praised for her acting and received a Top Excellence Award at the KBS Drama Awards.

In 2009, she was cast in a small supporting role (or extended cameo) as the hero's tough-but-stylish older sister in the highly popular Boys Over Flowers, adapted from the Japanese manga Hana Yori Dango. Then in the legal drama Partner, Kim played a widow-turned-lawyer whose passionate idealism clashes with her colleague's (Lee Dong-wook) detached cynicism.

Kim then spent ten days in Vancouver, Whistler, and Victoria to film the documentary ECO Canada by Kim Hyun-joo, which aired on MBC Life. Also featured as a photo spread in Sure magazine, the shoot promoted environmental awareness by emphasizing Canada's natural backdrops, and showing Kim's green practices such as using canvas instead of plastic bags and unplugging unused electrical appliances.

Her book Hyun-joo's Handcrafted Story was published on December 20, 2009, featuring personal essays and photos about her needlework and knitting.

2010 was a difficult year for Kim, with the deaths of three of her loved ones in close succession: her friend, actor Park Yong-ha committed suicide on June 30, the production company executive who'd cast her in The Land committed suicide on July 1 because of financial difficulties, and her father Kim Tae-beom died on July 7 after a long illness. She spent the rest of the year volunteering in Bangladesh and the Philippines as the goodwill ambassador for Good Neighbors, a humanitarian NGO. She donated the condolence money collected for her father's funeral and a portion of her book sales to Good Neighbors, which was used to build libraries in 11 orphanages in impoverished areas of Dhaka. Kim said, "I literally fled to Bangladesh after a series of personal tragedies, but I was consoled by the smiles of children who are living in these dire conditions. The act of sharing has given me strength to live". She continues to as an instructor for several classes organized by Good Neighbors, teaching Korean elementary schoolchildren about poverty around the world.

=== 2011–2015: Focusing on weekend dramas ===
Kim resumed her acting activities in 2011, playing the daughter from a wealthy publishing company whose life is turned upside down when she learns that she was switched at birth with another baby in Twinkle Twinkle. Her performance garnered a Top Excellence Award at the MBC Drama Awards. She also starred in Kim Dae-seung's short film Q&A, which was included in If You Were Me 5, an omnibus film commissioned by the National Human Rights Commission of Korea. Then in Dummy Mommy (2012), she played a fashion magazine editor with a genius-level IQ who is embarrassed by her developmentally disabled mother (Ha Hee-ra).

In a departure from her typical parts, Kim played one of the legendary femme fatales of the Joseon period, Lady Jo (or Jo Gwi-in), in the period drama Blooded Palace: The War of Flowers (2013). She said she was "more than delighted to have been given the opportunity to try something new", adding that, "This role will be a new life story for my acting career. I personally think it will be more interesting for an actress with an innocent image like myself to take up this wicked role". Critics praised Kim's versatility, as Lady Jo transforms from a naive young girl into an ambitious royal concubine who uses her beauty and wiles on King Injo in her lust for power.

In early 2014, Kim began hosting Musical Journey to Yesterday, a music program in which a mix of current idol singers and industry veterans perform live hit songs from the 1970s to 1990s. Later that year, she starred in the weekend drama What Happens to My Family?, which had over 40% ratings. Her performance garnered the Top Excellence award at the KBS Drama Awards.

In 2015, she played dual roles in the melodrama, I Have a Lover. She won the Top Excellence Top Excellence Award from the APAN Star Awards and SBS Drama Awards.

=== 2016–present: Professional expansion ===
Kim starred in the drama series Fantastic, portraying a screenwriter grappling with a terminal illness.

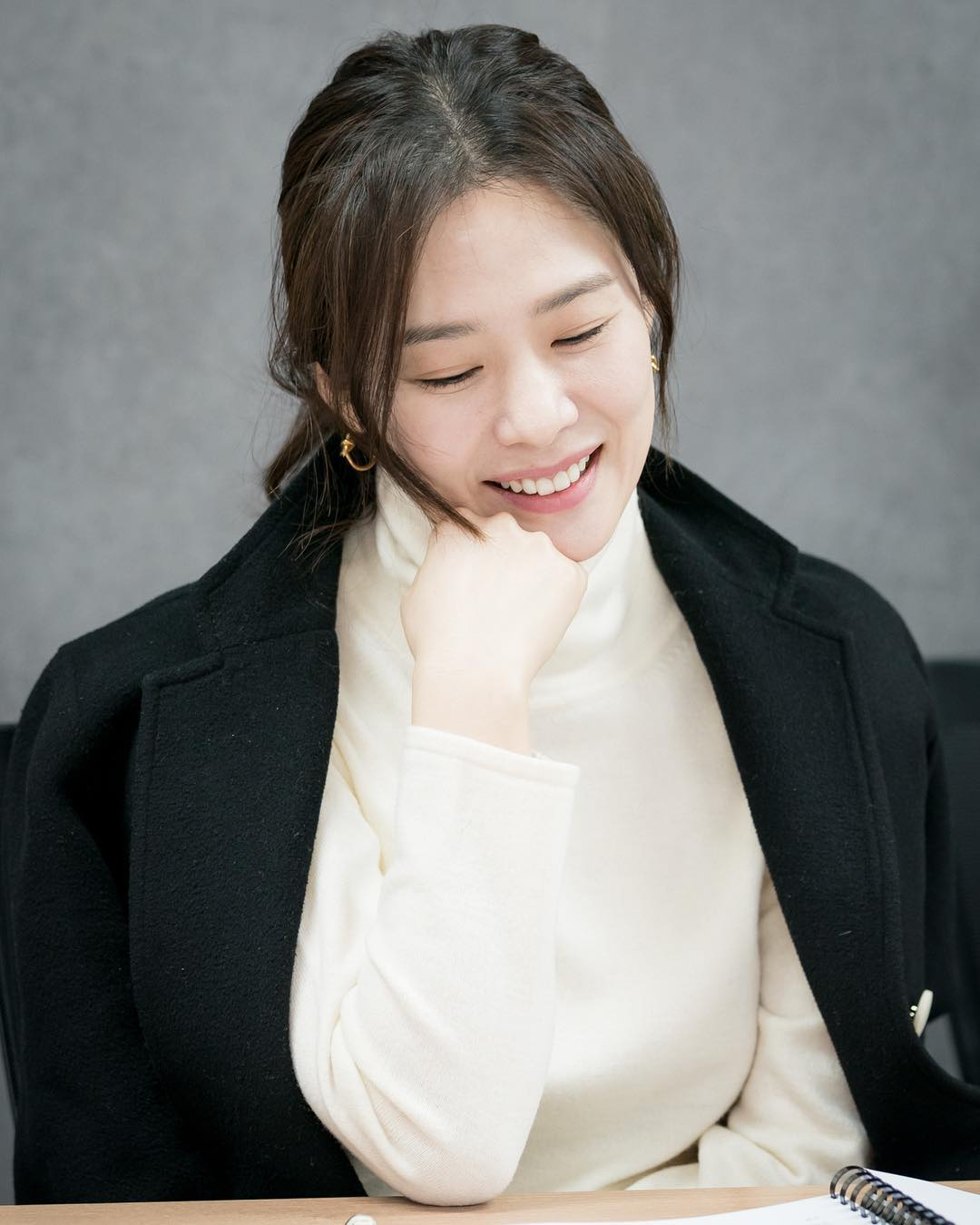
Kim at The Miracle We Met script reading session in 2018

In 2018, she took on the role of Sun Hye-jin in the fantasy melodrama The Miracle We Met, playing a wife who feels trapped in a loveless marriage. Kim described her character as a dormant volcano waiting to erupt, adding depth and complexity to the show's storyline."

In 2019, Kim starred in OCN's drama Watcher, portraying a criminal lawyer who had once been a highly promising prosecutor. Her performance garnered rave reviews, with critics praising her for creating a wholly unique and independent character, unlike any that they had seen before.

In 2020, Kim starred in Undercover, a JTBC's remake of the British BBC drama of the same name. The drama marked her third reunion with Ji Jin-hee, her co-star from the 2015 drama, I Have a Lover. Kim explained her reason for accepting the offer to join the drama, "Last time, for I Have a Lover, Ji helped me a lot on set. The reason viewers liked my character was that Ji made me shine in the series. So this time, I wanted to return that favor. Ji accepted the role first, and I knew that many people would want to see us reunite on screen, so it didn't take me long to decide to join the series".

That same year, Kim was confirmed to join the cast of Hellbound, a Netflix series directed by Yeon Sang-ho. She portrayed the character of Min Hye-jin, an attorney who courageously stands up against religious extremists.

In October 2022, Netflix confirmed that Kim would play one of the lead roles in their upcoming thriller drama, The Bequeathed. In December 2022, Kim starred in SBS's drama Trolley as the wife of a National Assembly member.

In 2023, Kim starred in the Netflix sci-fi film Jung-E directed by Hellbound director Yeon Sang-ho, in the title role of a legendary mercenary who is also the subject of brain-clone testing.

In April 2025, Kim has signed an exclusive contract with the new management company Siseon.

== Filmography ==
=== Film ===
Film performances
Year	Title	Role	Note	Ref.
1998	If It Snows On Christmas	Lee Song-hee		
1999	Calla	Yoon Soo-jin		
2003	Star Runner	Kim Mi-kyo	Hong Kong film	
2004	Shinsukki Blues	Seo Jin-young		
2011	If You Were Me 5: Questions & Answers	Jung Hee-joo	Omnibus film	
2023	Jung_E	Jung_E		
TBA	A Little Life (film)	Ja-young		
2026	Paradise Lost	Ryu So-Young		

=== Television series ===
Television series appearances
Year	Title	Role	Notes	Ref.
1997	Reason I Live For	Chun Shim		
1997	Couple	Jung Hee-ryung		
1997	Ready Go!	Na Min-jung		
1998	Love You! Love You!	Lee Joo-hee		
1998	Three Guys and Three Girls	Kim Hyun-joo	Episode 117, 133, 205, 207, 212, 214, 493	
1998	I Don't Know Anything But Love	Baek Young-gu		
1998	MBC Best Theater – "Jeondeungsa"	Hyo Im		
1999	Springtime	Cha Won-young		
1999	The Last War	Han Ji-eun		
1999	Into The Sunlight	Lee Yun-hee		
2000	Love Story – "Insomnia, Manual and Orange Juice"	Seo Young		
2000	Virtue	Jung Kwi-duk		
2000	Medical Center	Soo Kyung	Guest appearance (Episode 29)	
2001	Her House	Park Young-chae		
2001	The Merchant	Park Da-nyung		
2002	Glass Slippers	Lee Sun-woo/Kim Yoon-hee		
2004	Ms. Kim's Million Dollar Quest	Kim Eun-jae		
2004	Toji, the Land	Choi Seo-hee		
2005	Marrying a Millionaire	Han Eun-young		
2007	In-soon Is Pretty	Park In-soon		
2009	Boys Over Flowers	Gu Joon-hee	Guest appearance	
2009	Partner	Kang Eun-ho		
2011	Twinkle Twinkle	Han Jung-won		
2012	Dummy Mommy	Kim Young-joo		
2013	Blooded Palace: The War of Flowers	Jo Yam-jeon		
2014	Can We Fall In Love, Again?	Herself	Cameo (Episode 13–14)	
2014	What Happens to My Family?	Cha Kang-shim		
2015	I Have a Lover	Do Hae-kang (Dokgo On-gi)/Dokgo Yong-gi		
2016	Fantastic	Lee So-hye		
2018	The Miracle We Met	Sun Hye-jin		
2019	Watcher	Han Tae-joo		
2021	Undercover	Choi Yeon-soo		
2021–present	Hellbound	Min Hye-jin	Season 1–2	
2022	Love All Play	President of Eunice Business Team	Cameo (Episode 1)	
2022	Trolley	Kim Hye-joo		
2024	The Bequeathed	Yoon Seo-ha		
2026	100 Days of Deception	Yoo So-ran		

=== Television shows ===
Television show appearances
Year	Title	Role	Note	Ref.
1997	Scoop! Entertainment City	VJ		
1997	Popular Song Best 50	VJ		
1997	Saturday Power Start	MC		
1997	Gwangjang Music with Gung Sun-young	Panelist		
1998	Super TV Enjoy Sunday	MC		
	SBS Inkigayo	MC	Episode 18–20	
1999	Sunday Sunday Night	MC		
1999	Section TV Entertainment	MC	with Seo Kyung-suk	
1999	FM Dating with Kim Hyun-joo	DJ		
1999	MBC Drama Awards	MC	with Shin Dong-ho	
2000	Mnet KM Music Festival	MC		
2000	And e-Wonderful World	MC		
2005	SBS Drama Awards	MC	with Park Sang-won	
2009	Music Village with Kim Hyun-joo	DJ		
2009	ECO Canada by Kim Hyun-joo	Herself		
2010	SBS Hope TV	Host		
2014	Musical Journey to Yesterday	MC		
2015	Lady Action	Cast member		

=== Music video appearances ===
Music video appearances
Year	Title	Artist	Notes	Ref.
1996	"One's Lifetime" (일생을	Kim Hyun-chul		
1996	"The Day Was Beautiful" (그때가 좋았어	Seo Ji-won		
1997	"Entreaty" 애원	Lee Seung-hwan	with Jang Hyuk	
1998	"Now" 이젠	Yuno		
1999	"To the Bride" 신부에게	Yurisangja		
2001	"Already One Year" 벌써1년	Brown Eyes	with Chang Chen, Lee Beom-soo, Jung Eun-pyo	
2002	"Little By Little" 점점	Brown Eyes	with Chang Chen, Lee Beom-soo	
2004	"Parting Was Far Away" 이별은 멀었죠	Han Kyung Il		

== Bibliography ==
Year	Title	Author	ISBN
2009	Hyun-joo's Handcrafted Story 현주의 손으로 짓는 이야기	Kim Hyun-joo	978-8-9522-1314-3

== Discography ==
=== Singles ===
List of singles, showing year released, and name of the album
Title	Year	Album
"Sad Fate" 슬픈인연	2003	In the Name of Love
"Promise" (약속)	2009	Partner OST
"Forgetfulness" (건망증) (featuring PK Heman)	2012	Non-album single

== Ambassadorship ==
- Ambassador for Busan Contents Market (2022)

== Accolades ==
=== Awards and nominations ===
Name of the award ceremony, year presented, category, nominee of the award, and the result of the nomination
Award ceremony	Year	Category	Nominee / Work	Result	Ref.
APAN Star Awards	2013	Excellence Award, Actress in a Serial Drama	Blooded Palace: The War of Flowers	Nominated	
APAN Star Awards	2014	Excellence Award, Actress in a Serial Drama	What's With This Family	Nominated	
APAN Star Awards	2015	Top Excellence Award, Actress in a Serial Drama	I Have a Lover	Won	
APAN Star Awards	2022	Excellence Award, Actress in an OTT Drama	Hellbound	Nominated	
Baeksang Arts Awards	2002	Best Actress – Television	Her House	Nominated	
Baeksang Arts Awards	2006	Best Actress – Television	Toji, the Land	Nominated	
Baeksang Arts Awards	2008	Best Actress – Television	In-soon Is Pretty	Nominated	
Baeksang Arts Awards	2012	Best Actress – Television	Twinkle Twinkle	Nominated	
Baeksang Arts Awards	2016	Best Actress – Television	I Have a Lover	Nominated	
Director's Cut Awards	2022	Best Actress in series	Hellbound	Nominated	
KBS Drama Awards	2007	Top Excellence Award, Actress	In-soon Is Pretty	Won	
KBS Drama Awards	2014	Best Couple Award	Kim Hyun-joo (with Kim Sang-kyung); What's With This Family	Won	
KBS Drama Awards	2014	Top Excellence Award, Actress	What's With This Family	Won	
KBS Drama Awards	2014	Excellence Award, Actress in a Serial Drama	What's With This Family	Nominated	
KBS Drama Awards	2018	Excellence Award, Actress in a Mid-length Drama	The Miracle We Met	Nominated	
KBS Drama Awards	2018	Top Excellence Award, Actress	The Miracle We Met	Nominated	
Korea Drama Awards	2011	Best Actress	Twinkle Twinkle	Nominated	
Korea Drama Awards	2012	Top Excellence Award, Actress	Dummy Mommy	Nominated	
Korea Drama Awards	2016	Top Excellence Award, Actress	I Have a Lover	Nominated	
MBC Drama Awards	1998	Best New Actress	I Don't Know Anything But Love	Won	
MBC Drama Awards	2001	Excellence Award, Actress	Her House	Won	
MBC Drama Awards	2002	Top Excellence Award, Actress	Sangdo, Merchants of Joseon	Nominated	
MBC Drama Awards	2011	Best Couple Award	Kim Hyun-joo (with Kim Suk-hoon); Twinkle Twinkle	Won	
MBC Drama Awards	2011	Top Excellence Award, Actress in a Serial Drama	Twinkle Twinkle	Won	
OCN Awards	2019	Best Case Solver Award	Watcher	Won	
SBS Drama Awards	1998	Best New Actress	I Love You! I Love You!	Won	
SBS Drama Awards	2000	Excellence Award, Actress	Virtue	Won	
SBS Drama Awards	2002	Excellence Award, Actress in a Special Planning Drama	Glass Slippers	Won	
SBS Drama Awards	2002	SBSi Award	Glass Slippers	Won	
SBS Drama Awards	2002	Top 10 Stars Award	Glass Slippers	Won	
SBS Drama Awards	2004	Excellence Award, Actress in a Drama Special	Ms. Kim's Million Dollar Quest	Won	
SBS Drama Awards	2004	Top 10 Stars	Ms. Kim's Million Dollar Quest	Won	
SBS Drama Awards	2004	Top Excellence Award, Actress	Ms. Kim's Million Dollar Quest	Nominated	
SBS Drama Awards	2005	Netizen Popularity Award	Toji, the Land	Won	
SBS Drama Awards	2005	Top 10 Stars	Toji, the Land, Marrying a Millionaire	Won	
SBS Drama Awards	2005	Excellence Award, Actress in Serial Drama	Toji, the Land	Nominated	
SBS Drama Awards	2005	Top Excellence Award, Actress	Toji, the Land	Nominated	
SBS Drama Awards	2015	Best Couple Award	Kim Hyun-joo (with Ji Jin-hee); I Have a Lover	Won	
SBS Drama Awards	2015	Netizen Popularity Award	I Have a Lover	Won	
SBS Drama Awards	2015	Top 10 Stars	I Have a Lover	Won	
SBS Drama Awards	2015	Top Excellence Award, Actress in a Serial Drama	I Have a Lover	Won	
SBS Drama Awards	2015	Grand Prize	I Have a Lover	Nominated	
SBS Drama Awards	2023	Top Excellence Award, Actress in a Miniseries Romance/Comedy Drama	Trolley	Nominated	

=== Listicles ===
Name of publisher, year listed, name of listicle, and placement
Publisher	Year	Listicle	Placement	Ref.
Korean Film Council	2021	Korean Actors 200 (Note: Introduces 200 actors that best represent the present and future of Korean cinema to the people in the film industry all over the world.)	Included	
