= H (2002 film) =

- Theatrical poster
- Directed by: Lee Jong-hyeok
- Written by: Lee Jong-hyeok; Kim Hee-jae; Oh Seung-uk
- Produced by: Oh Jung-wan; Ryu Jin-ok
- Starring: Yum Jung-ah; Ji Jin-hee; Cho Seung-woo
- Cinematography: Choe Jin-woong
- Edited by: Hahm Sung-won
- Music by: Jo Seong-woo
- Distributed by: CJ Entertainment
- Release date: December 27, 2002
- Running time: 106 minutes
- Country: South Korea
- Language: Korean

H is a 2002 South Korean horror-thriller film. It was written and directed by Lee Jong-hyeok, and stars Yum Jung-ah, Ji Jin-hee, and Cho Seung-woo.

A serial killer who preyed on pregnant women has been behind bars for 10 months, when a copycat killer becomes active. Detectives meet with the imprisoned killer and search for clues in an effort to head off the copy cat killer before he kills more.

== Plot ==
Twenty-two-year-old serial killer Shin Hyun targeted pregnant women and turned himself in after committing several grisly murders. Ten months later a copycat killer became active, and detectives Kang and Kim are put on the case.

They track down the killer by following clues from the first two victims: A pregnant schoolgirl whose fetus the killer removed, and a single mother strangled from behind on a bus. They had tried to pump Shin for information, but without success. They stake out the killer's home, but when the killer comes home, he notices the cops and runs. Kang follows him into a nightclub, where the killer sees a lesbian couple, slices the ear off one of them and slits her throat, just like Shin's third victim. Kang fires two rounds into his chest; this puts him in a coma. Despite this, the murders still continue. The police capture the next suspect, but the murders keep occurring.

In the end, it is revealed that Shin's mother had tried to abort him, but he survived. The psychologist Dr. Chu had used post-hypnotic suggestion on the other two killers to make them commit copycat murders. Kang then kills Chu (imitating Shin's murder of an abortion doctor), but Kang is triggered by a CD mailed to him. Kang kills his own mother, who was a prostitute.

In the course of the movie, Shin is executed and his final words are "I killed my mother." This explains the sixth and last unidentified victim, whom he brought in a bag to the police station when he confessed. Kang is about to commit suicide when Kim shows up and kills him instead.

Just before the ending credits, the letter "H" appears and expands into the word "hypnosis", and its definition.

== Cast ==
- Yum Jung-ah as Detective Kim Mi-yeon
- Ji Jin-hee as Detective Kang Tae-hyun
- Cho Seung-woo as Shin Hyun
- Sung Ji-ru as Detective Park
- Min Woong-ki as Choi Young-jin
- Park Yong-soo as Chief Jang
- Kwon Hyuk-poong as Captain Lee
- Lee Eol as Detective Han Jung-woo
- Kim In-kwon as Heo Young-taek
- Park Kil-soo as Bae Yong-man
- Kim Sun-kyung as Dr. Chu Kyung-sook
- Kim Bu-seon
- Kim Roi-ha
- Yeon Seon-mi

== Awards ==
H was nominated for the International Fantasy Film Award at the 2004 Fantasporto.

== Reception ==
Kyu Hyun Kim of Koreanfilm.org praised the "distinctive production design and cinematography" and minimalist music score and sound design, which "contributes a great deal to the film's uniquely and unremittingly dark atmosphere." He also mentioned that the detectives' characterization was "believably professional and suitably humanized," aided by the cast's solid acting, notably by Sung Ji-roo's "excellent supporting performance." But he criticized the antagonist as "misconceived" and that the climactic revelation was "a complete letdown."

== Impact ==
A 2009 Indian film titled Amaravathi shares plot similarities with the film.
