= What Happens to My Family? =

2014–2015 South Korean television series

- Promotional poster
- Also known as: What's with This Family; Why Are Families Being Like This; What's Wrong? We Are Family; This Is Family
- Genre: Family; Romance; Comedy; Drama
- Written by: Kang Eun-kyung
- Directed by: Jeon Chang-geun
- Starring: Yoo Dong-geun; Kim Hyun-joo; Yoon Park; Park Hyung-sik
- Country of origin: South Korea
- Original language: Korean
- No. of episodes: 53

Production
- Producer: Kim Jung-gyu
- Production location: Korea
- Running time: 63 minutes
- Production company: Samhwa Networks

Original release
- Network: KBS2
- Release: August 16, 2014 – February 15, 2015

What Happens to My Family? (Korean: 가족끼리 왜 이래; RR: Gajokkkiri wae irae; lit. 'What's With This Family?') is a 2014–2015 South Korean television series starring Yoo Dong-geun, Kim Hyun-joo, Yoon Park and Park Hyung-sik. It aired on KBS2 on Saturdays and Sundays at 19:55 (KST) from August 16, 2014, to February 15, 2015.

== Synopsis ==
Cha Soon-bong (Yoo Dong-geun) is a widower who has devoted his life to his three children. His eldest daughter Kang-shim (Kim Hyun-joo), after a failed relationship, has resigned herself to never marry and a lifetime of being alone; his eldest son Kang-jae (Yoon Park), a brilliant oncologist, is resentful of his humble origins; and his youngest son, Dal-bong (Park Hyung-sik).

== Cast ==
=== Main ===
- Yoo Dong-geun as Cha Soon-bong

The patriarch of the Cha family and head of the household; owner of a tofu shop.

- Kim Hyun-joo as Cha Kang-shim

The eldest child; company secretary to CEO Moon Tae-oh and, in later episodes, to director Moon Tae-joo.

- Yoon Park as Cha Kang-jae

The second child; a skilled oncologist.

- Park Hyung-sik as Cha Dal-bong

The youngest child; he is struggling with finding a stable job.

=== Supporting ===
==== Cha family ====
- Yang Hee-kyung as Cha Soon-geum

Soon-bong's younger sister; Young-seol's mother and aunt to Kang-shim, Kang-jae and Dal-bong.

- Kim Jung-nan as Noh Young-seol

Soon-geum's daughter and cousin to Kang-shim, Kang-jae and Dal-bong.

- Kim Jung-min as Seo Joong-baek

Young-seol's husband; owner of a chicken restaurant.

==== People around Cha Kang-shim ====
- Kim Sang-kyung as Moon Tae-joo

Director at GK Group; CEO Moon's son.

- Kim Yong-gun as Moon Tae-oh

CEO of GK Group; Tae-joo's father and Kang-shim's boss.

- Na Young-hee as Baek Seol-hee

Eun-ho's mother; a famous news anchor and TV personality.

- Song Jae-hee as Byun Woo-tak

Kang-shim's ex-boyfriend; an attorney who handles Soon-bong's case against the Cha children.

==== People around Cha Kang-jae ====
- Son Dam-bi as Kwon Hyo-jin

Kang-jae's fiancée; daughter of Kwon Ki-chan and Heo Yang-geum; a food stylist.

- Kim Il-woo as Kwon Ki-chan

Hyo-jin's father and husband to Heo Yang-geum; director of the hospital where Kang-jae works.

- Kyeon Mi-ri as Heo Yang-geum

Director Kwon's wife and Hyo-jin's mother.

==== People around Cha Dal-bong ====
- Nam Ji-hyun as Kang Seo-wool
  - Kim Bo-yoon as young Kang Seo-wool

A country girl with a strong Chungcheong dialect; she moves to Seoul in the hopes of marrying Dal-bong.

- Seo Kang-joon as Yoon Eun-ho

Baek Seol-hee's son; an idol turned restaurant owner.

==== Others ====
- Kim Seo-ra as Miss Ko (Ko Bok-ja / Ko Eun-hwan)

A mysterious woman who became Soon-bong's close friend.

- Jang In-sub as The Sword

=== Special appearance ===
- Hwang Kwang-hee as Vitamin Salesman (Ep. 2)

== Ratings ==
- In this table, the blue numbers represent the lowest ratings and the red numbers represent the highest ratings.
- The drama aired with English subtitles on KBS World two weeks after its initial broadcast in Korea.

Ep.	Original broadcast date	Average audience share			
Ep.	Original broadcast date	AGB Nielsen		TNmS ratings	
Ep.	Original broadcast date	Nationwide	Seoul	Nationwide	Seoul
1	August 16, 2014	20.0%	20.5%	19.2%	18.0%
2	August 17, 2014	23.3%	24.0%	23.7%	24.4%
3	August 23, 2014	20.3%	20.2%	21.8%	22.0%
4	August 24, 2014	25.6%	25.3%	23.9%	24.3%
5	August 30, 2014	22.3%	22.4%	21.8%	21.2%
6	August 31, 2014	25.9%	25.8%	24.6%	25.7%
7	September 6, 2014	22.4%	22.2%	21.6%	23.1%
8	September 7, 2014	21.4%	21.2%	20.1%	20.7%
9	September 13, 2014	24.5%	24.7%	23.3%	23.8%
10	September 14, 2014	27.5%	29.0%	25.4%	25.7%
11	September 20, 2014	23.5%	24.4%	21.4%	21.5%
12	September 21, 2014	28.0%	28.8%	26.3%	27.9%
13	September 28, 2014	22.6%	22.8%	20.5%	22.9%
14	October 4, 2014	20.7%		18.8%	20.6%
15	October 5, 2014	28.8%	28.7%	25.8%	28.0%
16	October 11, 2014	24.4%	23.8%	24.0%	24.4%
17	October 12, 2014	29.5%	29.6%	26.4%	27.6%
18	October 18, 2014	25.8%	25.7%	25.5%	26.6%
19	October 19, 2014	31.8%	32.0%	29.3%	31.6%
20	October 25, 2014	28.6%		26.6%	27.6%
21	October 26, 2014	34.5%	34.7%	30.7%	33.2%
22	November 1, 2014	27.9%	27.0%	28.4%	29.0%
23	November 2, 2014	33.5%	34.2%	32.2%	34.3%
24	November 8, 2014	30.7%	30.9%	28.7%	29.1%
25	November 9, 2014	34.0%	33.6%	32.5%	34.5%
26	November 15, 2014	29.3%	29.4%	29.4%	29.0%
27	November 16, 2014	34.5%	34.9%	33.4%	36.0%
28	November 22, 2014	29.0%	28.7%	29.4%	29.3%
29	November 23, 2014	35.4%	35.8%	34.0%	37.4%
30	November 29, 2014	30.2%	29.8%	31.3%	32.0%
31	November 30, 2014	37.0%	35.8%	35.4%	37.9%
32	December 6, 2014	30.2%	29.6%	30.4%	31.7%
33	December 7, 2014	36.6%		35.0%	37.1%
34	December 13, 2014	32.4%		30.8%	31.0%
35	December 14, 2014	37.9%	38.0%	36.2%	38.3%
36	December 20, 2014	31.3%	30.2%	31.9%	33.2%
37	December 21, 2014	38.7%	38.0%	37.7%	40.3%
38	December 27, 2014	36.2%	36.4%	35.6%	37.0%
39	December 28, 2014	41.2%	42.2%	39.3%	41.9%
40	January 3, 2015	39.1%	39.3%	37.0%	38.8%
41	January 4, 2015	40.7%	40.9%	41.7%	44.4%
42	January 10, 2015	36.4%	35.6%	36.8%	38.4%
43	January 11, 2015	41.2%	41.9%	41.2%	44.3%
44	January 17, 2015	36.8%	37.3%	36.7%	37.8%
45	January 18, 2015	41.2%	41.9%	40.5%	42.9%
46	January 24, 2015	36.1%	36.4%	36.3%	37.8%
47	January 25, 2015	42.2%	43.0%	41.1%	43.7%
48	January 31, 2015	30.0%	29.9%	29.5%	30.3%
49	February 1, 2015	40.1%		39.3%	41.7%
50	February 7, 2015	35.1%	34.4%	37.4%	38.8%
51	February 8, 2015	43.3%	44.1%	41.2%	44.1%
52	February 14, 2015	37.6%	36.8%	37.7%	39.6%
53	February 15, 2015	43.1%	42.4%	40.8%	43.5%
Average		30.8%	32.2%	31.7%	31.8%

== Awards and nominations ==
Year	Award	Category	Recipient	Result
2014	3rd APAN Star Awards	Top Excellence Award, Actor in a Serial Drama	Yoo Dong-geun	Nominated
2014	3rd APAN Star Awards	Excellence Award, Actor in a Serial Drama	Kim Sang-kyung	Nominated
2014	3rd APAN Star Awards	Excellence Award, Actress in a Serial Drama	Kim Hyun-joo	Nominated
2014	3rd APAN Star Awards	Best New Actor	Park Hyung-sik	Nominated
2014	22nd Korea Culture and Entertainment Awards	Best Drama	What Happens to My Family?	Won
2014	KBS Drama Awards	Grand Prize (Daesang)	Yoo Dong-geun	Won
2014	KBS Drama Awards	Top Excellence Award, Actor	Yoo Dong-geun	Nominated
2014	KBS Drama Awards	Top Excellence Award, Actor	Kim Sang-kyung	Nominated
2014	KBS Drama Awards	Top Excellence Award, Actress	Kim Hyun-joo	Won
2014	KBS Drama Awards	Excellence Award, Actor in a Serial Drama	Yoo Dong-geun	Nominated
2014	KBS Drama Awards	Excellence Award, Actor in a Serial Drama	Kim Sang-kyung	Won
2014	KBS Drama Awards	Excellence Award, Actress in a Serial Drama	Kim Hyun-joo	Nominated
2014	KBS Drama Awards	Excellence Award, Actress in a Serial Drama	Yang Hee-kyung	Nominated
2014	KBS Drama Awards	Best Supporting Actress	Son Dam-bi	Nominated
2014	KBS Drama Awards	Best New Actor	Park Hyung-sik	Won
2014	KBS Drama Awards	Best New Actor	Seo Kang-joon	Nominated
2014	KBS Drama Awards	Best New Actress	Nam Ji-hyun	Won
2014	KBS Drama Awards	Best Writer	Kang Eun-kyung	Won
2014	KBS Drama Awards	Best Couple Award	Kim Sang-kyung and Kim Hyun-joo	Won
2014	KBS Drama Awards	Best Couple Award	Park Hyung-sik and Nam Ji-hyun	Won
2015	51st Baeksang Arts Awards	Best New Actor (TV)	Park Hyung-sik	Nominated
2015	51st Baeksang Arts Awards	Best New Actress (TV)	Nam Ji-hyun	Nominated
2015	8th Korea Drama Awards	Grand Prize (Daesang)	Yoo Dong-geun	Nominated

== Adaption ==
In 2015, a Turkish television adaptation of the series was released, titled The Baba Candir. A Mexican adaptation, ¿Qué le pasa a mi familia?, was released in 2021.

== International broadcast ==
Country	Network	Name
Latvia	TV3Life	Trīs Annas
Lithuania	TV8	Trys Anos
Estonia	TV3	Kolm õde
Russia	Лавстори	Три раза Анна
Thailand	PPTV HD	February 16, 2016 – June 21, 2016 (every Tuesday – Wednesday at 08:30 – 09:55).
Thailand	Channel 9 MCOT HD	February 10, 2018 – May 26, 2018 (on Saturday February 24 and Sunday February 25 at 22:11 – 23:06 due to live broadcast of DARE TO DREAM presents LPGA THAILAND 2018 golf at 23:11 – 00:02) (every Saturday and Sunday at 22:11 to 23:38).
