= Love Letter (TV series) =

South Korean television drama

- Love Letter DVD cover
- Hangul: 러브레터
- RR: Reobeureteo
- MR: Rŏbŭret'ŏ
- Genre: Melodrama; Romance
- Written by: Oh Soo-yeon
- Directed by: Oh Kyung-hoon
- Starring: Jo Hyun-jae; Soo Ae; Ji Jin-hee
- Music by: Moon Da-hyun
- Country of origin: South Korea
- No. of episodes: 16

Production
- Producer: Jang Geun-soo
- Running time: 60 minutes

Original release
- Network: MBC TV
- Release: February 10 – April 1, 2003

Love Letter (Korean: 러브레터) is a 2003 South Korean television series starring Jo Hyun-jae, Soo Ae and Ji Jin-hee. It aired on MBC from February 10 to April 1, 2003, on Mondays and Tuesdays at 21:55 for 16 episodes.

This drama revolves around Lee Woo-jin's conflict between priesthood and his love for childhood friend Eun-ha.

== Overview ==
=== Act 1 - Growing up ===
As a young orphan, Lee Woo-jin (Andrew) received horrible treatment while growing up under his aunt. When his uncle (a priest) comes back from Italy, he decides to raise him. Eun-ha, another orphan, is brought to the cathedral as well. Although initially antagonistic towards Woo-jin, the two become inseparable friends. At the end of high school, when Eun-ha is about to confess her feelings for Andrew, Andrew tells her of his dreams to become a priest.

=== Act 2 - College ===
Andrew and Eun-ha leave the cathedral to attend college. Andrew meets Jung Woo-jin, and the two become close friends. Jung Woo-jin falls in love with Eun-ha, but she rebuffs his attentions. The love triangle causes hurt and pain for all 3 friends. It is brought to a climax when Andrew writes Eun-ha a love letter, but Jung Woo-jin destroys it without Eun-ha having read it.

=== Act 3 - Finale ===
Andrew returns from the seminary but has not taken his final vows of priesthood. Eun-ha develops a heart condition, and before her final operation, makes Andrew promise to fulfill his dreams of becoming a priest. After the operation Eun-ha slips into a coma. Jung Woo-jin is finally able to escape the love triangle, and Andrew takes his vows to become a priest. Eun-ha then awakens from her coma, and Andrew agrees to take care of her.

== Cast and characters ==
=== Main characters ===
- Jo Hyun-jae as Lee Woo-jin/Andrew
  - Yoo Seung-ho as young Lee Woo-jin/Andrew

Lee Woo-jin was raised by a cruel aunt before being taken to live with his priest uncle. Although he believes his mother has died, it is later revealed that she abandoned him to become Jung Woo-jin's stepmother. Kind and introspective, he wrestles with his desire to become a priest with his feelings for Eun-ha. He studied medicine in university and is a trained surgeon.

- Soo Ae as Cho Eun-ha

Another orphan taken into care at the seminary after the death of her mother. Although antagonistic at first towards everyone, she slowly develops feelings for Lee Woo-jin. She is caught between affections from Jung Woo-jin and her own unrequited love for Lee Woo-jin. A life-threatening heart condition makes her ask Lee Woo-jin to choose priesthood over her. Although the surgery on her heart is a success, she slips into a coma. She awakens from her coma at the end of the series, ready to spend the rest of her life with Lee Woo-jin.

- Ji Jin-hee as Jung Woo-jin

Although initially friendly to Lee Woo-jin, his jealously of the relationship between Eun-ha and Lee Woo-jin, as well as the discovery that his stepmother is Woo-jin's biological mother, causes him to act out of character and sabotage Lee Woo-jin's attempt at happiness. Like Lee Woo-jin he is also a qualified surgeon. He has unresolved issues with his father for leaving his biological mother and although he rebels against him, he finds himself turning out to be exactly like him.

=== Supporting characters ===
- Son Hyun-joo as Father Peter

Father Peter is Lee Woo-jin's maternal uncle who raised him in the church after rescuing him from a cruel paternal aunt.

- Kim Young-ae as Dr. Im Kyung-eun

Im Kyung-eun is Lee Woo-jin's biological mother who abandoned him at birth.

- Kim Yoon-kyung as Seo-young

Eun-ha's friend.

- Kwon Min-joong as Sister Esther
- Yoon Yoo-sun as Sister Gemma
- Yang Hee-kyung as Maria

Father Peter's cook/housekeeper.

- Joo Hyun as Dr. Jung Myung-woo

Im Kyung-eun's husband and Jung Woo-jin's father.

- Choi Jae-hyung
- Seo Hyun-ki
- Son Young-joon

Jung Woo-jin's friend

- Jung Mi-ae as Andrew's high school classmate
- Han Ye-rin as Hee-jin

Lee Woo-jin's cousin.
