= High Society (2015 TV series) =

2015 South Korean television series

- Promotional poster
- Also known as: The Privileged
- Genre: Romance; Melodrama
- Written by: Ha Myung-hee
- Directed by: Choi Young-hoon
- Starring: Uee; Sung Joon; Park Hyung-sik; Lim Ji-yeon
- Composer: Ha Geun-young
- Country of origin: South Korea
- Original language: Korean
- No. of episodes: 16

Production
- Executive producer: Moon Bo-mi
- Producers: Han Jung-hwan; Yoo Hyun-ki; Kim Dong-ho; Kim Si-hwan
- Cinematography: Seo Deuk-won; Moon Gi-seop
- Editors: Park In-cheol; Shin Sook
- Running time: 60 minutes
- Production company: HB Entertainment

Original release
- Network: SBS TV
- Release: June 8 – July 28, 2015

High Society (Korean: 상류사회; RR: Sangnyusahoe) is a 2015 South Korean television series starring Uee, Sung Joon, Park Hyung-sik and Lim Ji-yeon. It aired on SBS TV from June 8 to July 28, 2015 on Mondays and Tuesdays at 21:55 (KST) for 16 episodes.

== Synopsis ==
Jang Yoon-ha (Uee) is the youngest daughter of a chaebol family. Her family is a mess. Hated by her mother, she wants to live a normal life like a normal person. Her parents arrange for her to marry a young chaebol Yoo Chang-soo (Park Hyung-sik). She hides her identity and works as a part-time sales woman in a supermarket and befriends with Lee Ji-yi (Lim Ji-yeon) who wants to marry a rich man and starts dreaming about it. Lee Ji-yi has a crush on Choi Joon-gi (Sung Joon), a brilliant and hard-working friend of Yoo Chang-soo, who comes from a poor family and wants to become rich by marrying a rich girl. Joon-gi catches Yoon-ha's attention. Joon-gi confesses his feelings to Yoon-ha and asks her to become his girlfriend. Yoon-ha starts a relationship with Joon-gi and it goes well. Meanwhile, Yoo Chang-soo flirts with Lee Ji-yi and they become a couple.

Yoon-ha and her brother, who is the only hope of the top management of the company, plan to take a trip to Mexico. Yoon-ha gets off the flight early, with her brother's blessing, in order to spend more time with her new boyfriend, Joon-gi. After reaching Mexico, Yoon-ha's brother boards a yacht which crashes and is destroyed against a reef. He is presumed dead, even though his body is not found. Yoon-ha's mother blames Yoon-ha for her son's death and starts crying and drinking continuously. Joon-gi secretly released Yoon-ha's photo in public without her knowledge and reveals that she is an heiress. Yoon-ha becomes a celebrity. Yoon-ha's brother transferred all of his shares to Yoon-ha. One day, Yoon-ha visits Joon-gi's house. She meets his mother and unknowingly she shows Yoon-ha's childhood photo in Joon-gi's drawer. Heartbroken Yoon-ha leaves his house angrily, she decides to join in the company for cosmetics department. Yoon-ha's sister would do anything to have control over the company. On the other hand, Yoo Chang-soo and Lee Ji-yi relationship is shaken by Chang-soo's mother.

She wants to break their relationship and to marry Yoon-ha. Choi Joon-gi realises his love for Yoon-ha and wants to reconcile with her. Yoon-ha uses her popularity to make a huge profit in the cosmetics department and becomes a higher authority in the company. Later, Yoon-ha unites with Joon-gi. Yoon-ha discovers her brother's secret documents filed against her sister about cosmetics ingredients trades in the company.

At last it is revealed that Yoon-ha's brother is alive and he comes back to the company. Choi Joon-gi quits his job. Yoo Chang-soo becomes stressed and drinks continuously which makes his mother unite him with Lee Ji-yi. Finally, Yoon-ha's sister is thrown out of the company. Joon-gi proposes to Yoon-ha. Lee Ji-yi becomes pregnant with Yoo Chang-soo's child.

== Cast ==
=== Main ===
- Uee as Jang Yoon-ha

The youngest daughter of a chaebol family. She took part-time jobs in order to handle her family-induced stress. She does not let people get close to her because those people often hurt or always leave her, but she falls in love with Joon-gi.

- Sung Joon as Choi Joon-gi

He grew up in poverty and since a young age, has worked hard to earn his high-ranking position. He initially dates Yoon-ha to gain powers, but eventually his feelings become real.

- Park Hyung-sik as Yoo Chang-soo

He is also a chaebol, and Joon-gi's boss. He falls for Yoon-ha's best friend Ji-yi, due to the fact that she overlooked his wealth and status. He doesn't like being used by people he considers allies.

- Lim Ji-yeon as Lee Ji-yi

She is Yoon-ha's best friend and Chang-soo's girlfriend. At first she didn't know about Yoon-ha's real identity and had a crush on Joon-gi. She had imagined chaebols to be people who led an easy life and got whatever they want; those are the reasons why she refused to date Chang-soo at first. But his earnest affection for her made her change her mind.

=== Supporting ===
- Yoon Joo-sang as Jang Won-sik

Yoon-ha's father.

- Go Doo-shim as Min Hye-soo

Yoon-ha's mother.

- Lee Sang-woo as Jang Kyung-joon

Yoon-ha's older brother. He was very caring and protective of Yoon-ha, her only ally in the family. Kyung-joon's boat sank off the coast of Mexico, and he is presumed dead.

- Yoon Ji-hye as Jang Ye-won

Yoon-ha's eldest sister. She will do anything to succeed.

- Yoo So-young as Jang So-hyun

Yoon-ha's second oldest sister. She is jealous of Yoon-ha because their parents let her do whatever she wants; however, Yoon-ha only wants to be loved by her parents. So-hyun is vain and very high maintenance.

- Bang Eun-hee as Kim Seo-ra

Won-sik's mistress.

- Nam Myung-ryul as Choi Young-ho

Joon-gi's father.

- Yang Hee-kyung as Lee Min-sook

Joon-gi's mother, who works as Seo-ra's housekeeper.

- Choi Yong-min as Butler Hong

A longtime employee of the Jang family.

== Production ==
- Its early working titles were Chaebol's Daughter (재벌의 딸; Jaebeorui ttal) and True Romance (트루 로맨스; Teuru romaenseu).
- Screenwriter Ha Myung-hee and director Choi Young-hoon previously worked together on One Warm Word (2013).

== Ratings ==
Ep.	Original broadcast date	Average audience share			
Ep.	Original broadcast date	Nielsen Korea		TNmS	
Ep.	Original broadcast date	Nationwide	Seoul	Nationwide	Seoul
1	June 8, 2015	7.3% (20th)	7.7% (19th)	6.7%	8.6%
2	June 9, 2015	7.0% (20th)	7.6% (18th)	6.9%	8.4%
3	June 15, 2015	7.7% (19th)	9.1% (15th)	6.7%	8.8%
4	June 16, 2015	8.2% (16th)	9.9% (10th)	6.9%	8.8%
5	June 22, 2015	9.1% (12th)	10.4% (7th)	7.6%	9.5%
6	June 23, 2015	9.8% (9th)	11.3% (6th)	7.8%	10.2%
7	June 29, 2015	9.1% (14th)	10.9% (5th)	7.1%	8.2%
8	June 30, 2015	8.9% (17th)	9.8% (12th)	7.6%	9.4%
9	July 6, 2015	9.4% (12th)	10.9% (5th)	7.3%	9.3%
10	July 7, 2015	9.2% (12th)	10.2% (6th)	7.0%	9.3%
11	July 13, 2015	9.4% (13th)	10.5% (8th)	8.3%	9.6%
12	July 14, 2015	9.6% (10th)	10.4% (5th)	7.8%	10.5%
13	July 20, 2015	9.5% (13th)	10.7% (9th)	7.4%	9.1%
14	July 21, 2015	9.8% (12th)	10.7% (7th)	8.3%	10.3%
15	July 27, 2015	9.7% (12th)	10.7% (9th)	8.4%	10.2%
16	July 28, 2015	10.1% (10th)	11.1% (5th)	8.7%	11.2%
Average		9.0%	10.1%	7.5%	9.4%
In the table above, the blue numbers represent the lowest ratings and the red numbers represent the highest ratings.

== Awards and nominations ==
Year	Award	Category	Recipient	Result
2015	8th Korea Drama Awards	Best New Actress	Lim Ji-yeon	Won
2015	4th APAN Star Awards	Best New Actress	Lim Ji-yeon	Won
2015	23rd SBS Drama Awards	Excellence Actor in a mini-series	Park Hyung-sik	Won
2015	23rd SBS Drama Awards	Excellence Actor in a mini-series	Sung Joon	Nominated
2015	23rd SBS Drama Awards	Excellence Actress in a mini-series	Uee	Nominated
2015	23rd SBS Drama Awards	New Star Award	Park Hyung-sik	Won
2015	23rd SBS Drama Awards	New Star Award	Lim Ji-yeon	Won
2015	23rd SBS Drama Awards	Best Couple Award	Sung Joon and Uee	Nominated
2015	23rd SBS Drama Awards	Best Couple Award	Park Hyung-sik and Lim Ji-yeon	Nominated

== Adaptation ==
A Turkish adaptation titled Yüksek Sosyete was produced by Burak Sağyaşar and aired by Star TV for 26 episodes from June 16 to December 24, 2016. It starred Engin Öztürk as working-class man Kerem Özkan and Hazar Ergüçlü as rich woman Cansu Koran.
