= My Heart Twinkle Twinkle =

- Promotional poster
- Also known as: My Heart Shines; My Heart Is Twinkling; Twinkle Twinkle My Heart; My Twinkling Heart
- Genre: Family; Melodrama; Romance
- Written by: Jo Jung-sun
- Directed by: Oh Se-kang; Kim Yoo-jin
- Starring: Jang Shin-young; Bae Soo-bin; Lee Tae-im; Nam Bo-ra
- Composer: Yoo Young-sun
- Country of origin: South Korea
- Original language: Korean
- No. of episodes: 26

Production
- Executive producers: Ahn Je-hyeon; Shin Sang-yoon
- Producer: Hong Sung-chang
- Cinematography: Bae Hong-soo
- Editor: Bang Su-yeon
- Running time: 65 minutes
- Production company: Samhwa Networks

Original release
- Network: SBS TV
- Release: January 17 – April 12, 2015

My Heart Twinkle Twinkle (Korean: 내 마음 반짝반짝; RR: Nae maeum banjjakbanjjak) is a 2015 South Korean television series starring Jang Shin-young, Bae Soo-bin, Lee Tae-im, and Nam Bo-ra. Cut short from the original order of 50 episodes due to abysmal ratings ranging from 2 to 3 percent, it aired on SBS TV from January 17 to April 12, 2015 on Saturdays and Sundays at 22:00 for 26 episodes.

== Plot ==
Jinshim Original Fried Chicken restaurant is owned by Lee Jin-sam, who has three daughters: Lee Soon-jin, Lee Soon-soo, and Lee Soon-jung. Since their mother's death, eldest daughter Soon-jin has been running the restaurant and taking care of her father and younger sisters. She struggles to keep Jinshim afloat against its rival restaurant Woontak Chicken, which is managed by the ruthless Chun Woon-tak. Middle daughter Soon-soo is a pianist, but becomes heartbroken when her boyfriend breaks up with her because of her poor background. Youngest daughter Soon-jung finds herself caught in a love triangle between two men, Jang Soon-chul and Cha Do-hoon.

== Cast ==
- Jang Shin-young as Lee Soon-jin
  - Lee Young-eun as young Soon-jin
- Bae Soo-bin as Chun Woon-tak
- Lee Tae-im as Lee Soon-soo
  - Heo Jung-eun as young Soon-soo
- Lee Pil-mo as Jang Soon-chul
- Nam Bo-ra as Lee Soon-jung
  - Shin Rin-ah as young Soon-jung
- Oh Chang-seok as Cha Do-hoon
- Lee Deok-hwa as Lee Jin-sam
- Yoon Mi-ra as Lee Mal-sook
- Son Eun-seo as Chun Geum-bi
- Ha Jae-sook as Chun Eun-bi
- Geum Bo-ra as Hwang Mi-ja
- Do Ki-seok as Park Yong-sik
- Jung Eun-woo as Gu Kwan-mo
- Yoon Da-hoon as Pyo Sung-joo
- Kim Dong-hyun as Cha Seok-nam
- Jung Ae-ri as Kang Sung-sook
- Jo Seung-hyun as Yang Min-ho
- Cha Soo-yeon as Cha Ye-rin
- Yang Hee-kyung as Restaurant owner Gong
- Jung Gyu-soo as Han Young-pyo
- Kim Hyung-kyu as Sun-ho
- Seo Dong-won
- Kim Jin-yeop as Hyung-shik

== International broadcast ==
- It aired in Vietnam on HTV2 from December 15, 2015 under the title Người chồng hai mặt.
