= Ms. Kim's Million Dollar Quest =

2004 South Korean television drama series

- Promotional poster
- Hangul: 파란만장 미스 김 10억 만들기
- RR: Paranmanjang Miseu Gim 10eok mandeulgi
- MR: P'aranmanjang Misŭ Kim 10ŏk mandŭlgi
- Genre: Drama; Romantic; Comedy
- Written by: Park Yeon-seon
- Directed by: Lee Min-cheol; Jang Ki-hong; Jin Seok-gyu
- Starring: Kim Hyun-joo; Ji Jin-hee; Kim Sung-ryung; Park Gun-hyung
- Country of origin: South Korea
- Original language: Korean
- No. of episodes: 16

Production
- Producer: Gu Bon Geun
- Running time: 70 minutes

Original release
- Network: SBS TV
- Release: April 7 – May 27, 2004

Ms. Kim's Million Dollar Quest (Korean: 파란만장 미스 김 10억 만들기) is a South Korean television series directed by Lee Min-cheol, Jang Ki-hong, and Jin Seok-gyu, and starring Kim Hyun-joo, Ji Jin-hee, Kim Sung-ryung, and Park Gun-hyung. It aired on SBS every Wednesday and Thursday at 21:55 KST from April 7, 2004, to May 27, 2004.

== Plot ==
On her wedding day, Kim Eun-jae finds herself abandoned by the groom, Yoo Young-Hoon. Her wedding photographer, Park Moo-yeol, is a rich playboy, who helps Eun Jae avoid humiliation by pretending to be her fiancé. Soon Moo Yeol's family becomes bankrupt, and their family home will be sold if Moo-yeol does not come up with enough money. Meanwhile, Eun-jae believes that if she becomes rich, Young-hoon would return to her. Hence, Eun-Jae and Moo-Yeol decide to cooperate. They move in together and think of ways to make money together. However, making money is not as easy as they thought. They both begin to realize that even though they are unlucky in money, they are very lucky in love.

== Cast ==
Main

- Kim Hyun-joo - Kim Eun-jae
- Ji Jin-hee - Park Mu-yeol
- Kim Sung-ryung - Suh Woo-kyung
- Park Gun-hyung - Yoo Young-hoon

Supporting

- Shin Goo - Kim Hee-taek
- Yeo Woon-kay - Lee Kkeut-sun
- Bong Tae-gyu - Bong-kyu
- Sung Ji-ru - Jo Min-ho
- Jo Eun-sook - Han Ji-hee
- Hong Soo-hyun - Lee Jin
- Park Sun-woo - Bae Sang-in
- Park Won-sook - Mu-yeol's mother

== Awards ==
Năm	Awards	Category	Recipient	Result
2004	SBS Drama Awards	Excellence Award, Actor in a Drama Special	Ji Jin-hee	Won
2004	SBS Drama Awards	Excellence Award, Actress in a Drama Special	Kim Hyun-joo	Won
