= Park Hyung-sik =

South Korean actor and singer (born 1991)

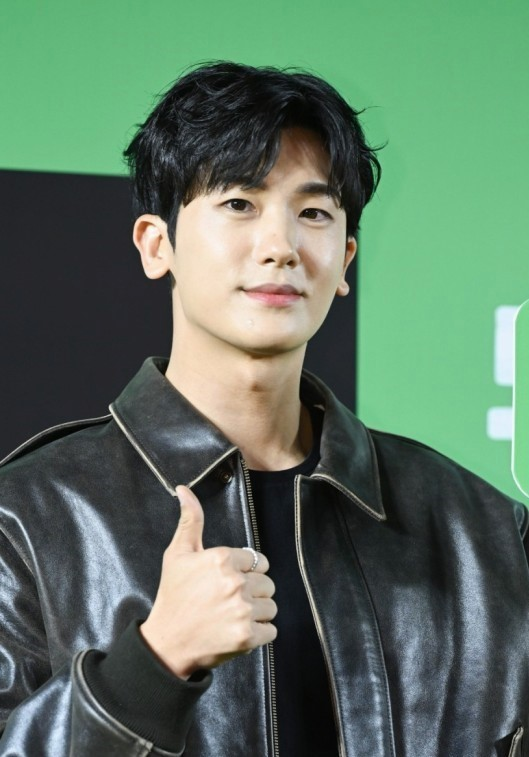
- Park in 2023
- Born: November 16, 1991 (age 34); Yongin, South Korea
- Occupations: Actor; singer
- Years active: 2010–present
- Agent: Rêve (레브)
- Musical career
- Genre: K-pop
- Member of: ZE:A; ZE:A Five

Korean name
- Hangul: 박형식
- Hanja: 朴炯植
- RR: Bak Hyeongsik
- MR: Pak Hyŏngsik

Signature
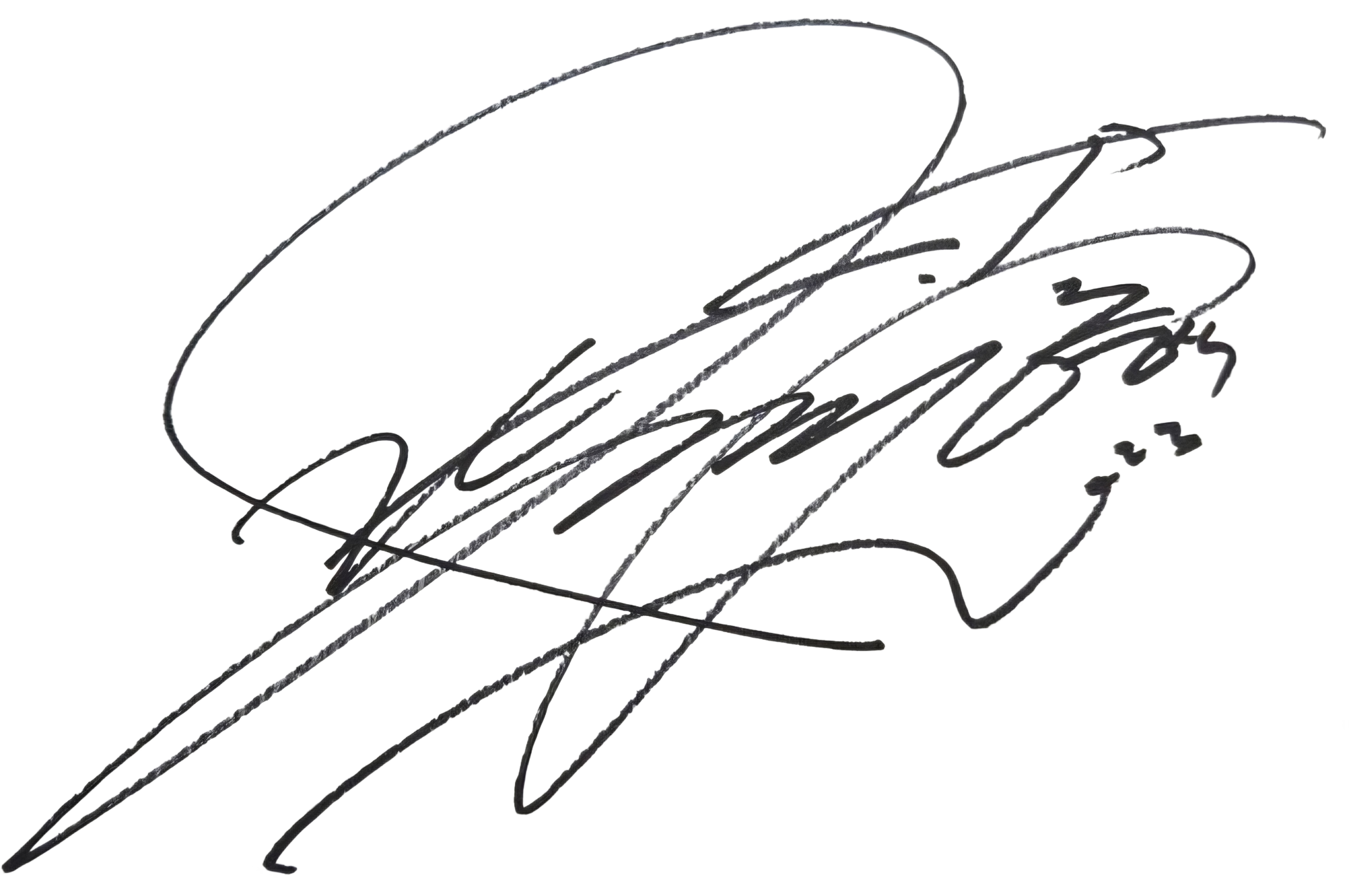

Park Hyung-sik (Korean: 박형식; born November 16, 1991) is a South Korean actor and singer. He debuted as a member of the South Korean boy group ZE:A in 2010. As an actor, he is known for his roles in television series Strong Girl Bong-soon (2017), Happiness (2021), Doctor Slump (2024), and Buried Hearts (2025).

== Life and career ==
=== 1991–2009: Early life and training ===
Park Hyung-sik was born on November 16, 1991, in Giheung District, Yongin, South Korea, as the second of two sons. His father is a member of the board of directors at BMW Korea, and his mother is a piano teacher. He was named Hyung-sik (형식; 炯植) by a Buddhist monk, as his mother and grandmother are Buddhists. Park joined his school's band as a vocalist in middle school. They covered popular Korean contemporary artists such as Buzz and Flower. During Yongin's Youth Music Contest, his last competition with the band, Park received several business cards from different entertainment agencies and decided to audition with the support of his parents. He passed and began his training at the start of high school. Park said that he liked singing but struggled with dancing. After a year, Park followed his manager and joined Star Empire Entertainment, where he continued to train for two more years. Every day, Park attended school in Yongin, commuted by bus to the agency located in Seoul to train, and returned home in the middle of the night.

As a trainee, Park appeared in the music video for the 2009 single "Date" by labelmates Jewelry S and modeled for a school uniform brand. His first appearance as a member of Star Empire's boy group ZE:A was in Mnet's reality television series Star Empire, aired in April 2009. The series told the "behind-the-scenes stories" of the entertainment industry, focusing on the lives of the company's staff, managers, and trainees. In October 2009, Park appeared in a second Mnet series, Empire Kids Returns, documenting the group's street performances across South Korea staged to prepare for their upcoming debut.

=== 2010–2014: ZE:A, acting debut, and rising popularity ===
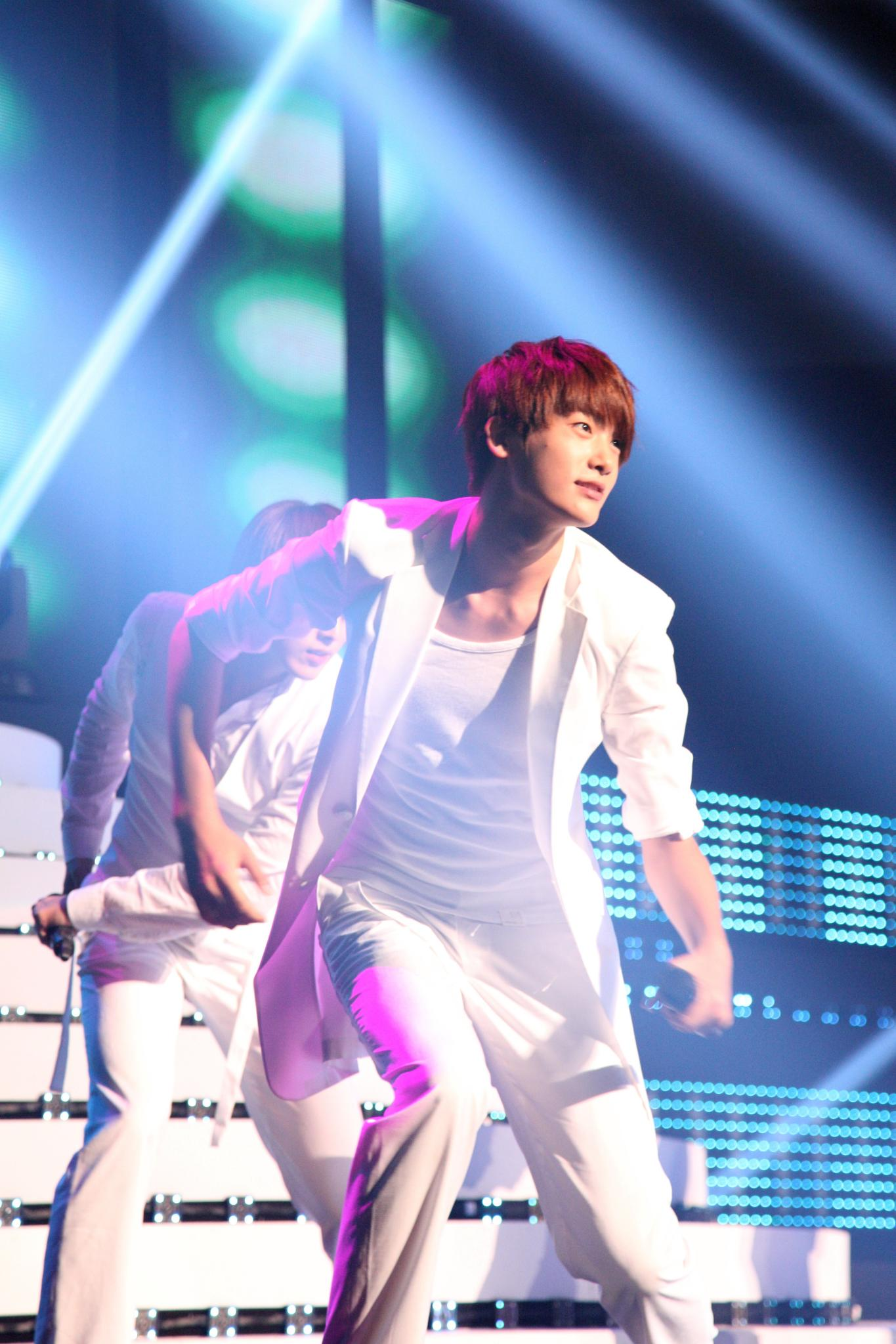
Park performing at the Cyworld Dream Music Festival on July 23, 2011.

ZE:A debuted with their first single album Nativity on January 7, 2010. That year, he made cameo appearances in the television series Prosecutor Princess, Marry Me, Please, and Gloria. In 2011, Park began his theatrical career as a cast member alongside Super Junior's Ryeowook in the musical Temptation of Wolves. He began his acting career in 2012, starring in SBS' special drama I Remember You. The same year, he starred in SBS' Dummy Mommy, where he played a vocalist of an indie band. The following year, Park had a role in KBS2's drama special Sirius (2013), where he played the adolescent version of twin brothers with starkly contrasting personalities. It was also in early 2013 when Park participated in his second musical theatre production, Gwanghwamun Love Song, playing the role of Ji-Yong. In March 2013, Park, along with his fellow ZE:A members Siwan, Kevin, Minwoo and Dongjun formed the group's first sub-unit called ZE:A Five. He then featured in tvN's time-slip drama Nine as the younger version of Lee Jin-wook's character. Park gained wider recognition after joining Real Men in June 2013, where he was nicknamed "Baby Soldier" for his innocent, yet passionate image.

In September 2013, Park was cast as Clyde in his third musical theatre production, Bonnie & Clyde. He followed this with a role in hit teen drama The Heirs (2013). In early 2014, Park was cast for the role of D'Artagnan in his fourth musical production, The Three Musketeers. And in August of the same year, Park joined the main cast of the family drama What's With This Family (2014) as Cha Dal-bong, the youngest child who is struggling with finding a stable job.

=== 2015–2020: Breakthrough and military enlistment ===
In 2015, Park was part of the main cast in SBS's romance drama High Society where he played the role of a chaebol who falls for a part-timer at the gourmet supermarket he manages. Park drew favorable reviews for his performance in the series, which led to increased popularity for the actor in Japan. In the following year, Park was once again cast for the role of D'Artagnan in the 2016 musical production of The Three Musketeers. And in December 2016, he starred in the historical drama Hwarang: The Poet Warrior Youth, playing the role of Sammaekjong, a young and distrustful king.

In February 2017, Park starred in his first leading role in cable network JTBC's Strong Girl Bong-soon, playing the CEO of a game company, Ainsoft. The romantic-comedy with Park Bo-young was a critical and commercial success and became one of the highest-rated Korean dramas in cable television history. Park experienced a rise in popularity and received increased endorsement offers. In April 2017, Park officially signed with United Artists Agency (UAA) after deciding not to renew with his former agency, Star Empire Entertainment. In December 2017, he starred in a romantic short film, Two Rays of Light alongside Han Ji-min.

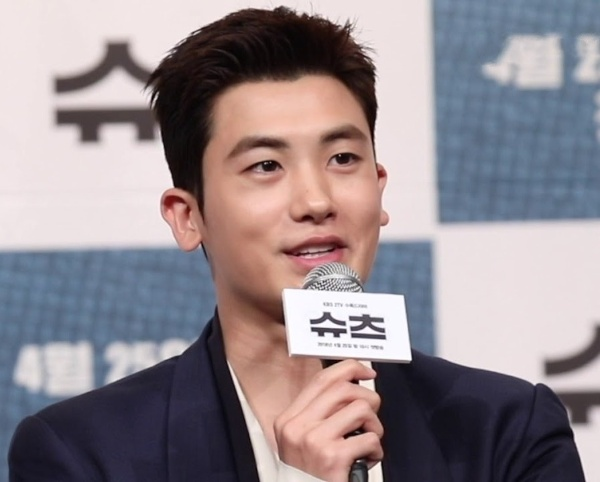
Park in 2018

In April 2018, Park starred in the Korean remake of American legal drama series Suits, portraying the Korean counterpart of Mike Ross. Following this, in November 2018, Park returned to the musical scene, playing the role of Der Tod in the stage production of Elisabeth. In May 2019, Park made his feature film debut in the legal film Juror 8. This role won him the Best New Actor award at the 39th Korean Association of Film Critics Awards in November 2019. The role also earned him nominations for Best New Actor (Film) at the 40th Blue Dragon Film Awards and 56th Baeksang Arts Awards. Park began his mandatory military service on June 10, 2019. He entered the Nonsan Army Recruit Training Center in South Chungcheong Province to start his basic military training and completed the rest of his military duties in the military police department of the Capital Defense Command as an active duty soldier. Park had earlier revealed that he was inspired to join the Capital Defense Command after he received positive feedback for his shooting skills while training for the variety show Real Man. The actor said that he wanted to put his skills to good use and was excited to join the unit and be of service to his country.

=== 2021–present: Return to acting and resurgence ===
Following his military discharge in January 2021, Park starred in the apocalyptic city thriller Happiness as Jung Yi-hyun, an intelligent and honest violent crimes detective alongside Han Hyo-joo. Happiness recorded modest television ratings in South Korea at the time of airing, but became a sleeper hit upon its global release on streaming services several months later. In particular, praise was given to his chemistry with co-star Han Hyo-joo, and the series reached number six on the Most Popular TV Shows ranking on Netflix worldwide.

The following year, Park starred in the four-episode musical romance Soundtrack #1. Park accepted the role to work with director Kim Hee-won and co-star Han So-hee. The actors' performances received mixed reviews; NME said that Park and Han "bring the lead characters to life with charming effortlessness" and Newsen stated that "it is thanks to Park Hyung-sik and Han So-hee that we want to keep watching the obvious unrequited romance", while the South China Morning Post considered that "neither of the stars can sell the romance". Park also appeared in the reality television series In the Soop: Friendcation with his group of celebrity friends, the "Wooga Squad", consisting of Park Seo-joon, V, Choi Woo-shik, and Peakboy. Park first met Park Seo-joon and V on the set of Hwarang; the former later introduced him to Choi Woo-shik and Peakboy. In February 2023, Park starred as Lee Hwan, a cursed crown prince, in the television series Our Blooming Youth opposite Jeon So-nee.

In 2024, Park reunited with his former The Heirs co-star Park Shin-hye as the male lead in the rom-com medical drama, Doctor Slump, which aired on JTBC from January 27 to March 17.

In 2025, Park starred in the revenge drama Buried Hearts with Huh Joon-ho, Lee Hae-young, and Hong Hwa-yeon. This aired on SBS from February 21 to April 12, 2025. He received acclaim for his role as the protagonist, Seo Dong-joo, leading the show with his deepened emotional acting and intense action scenes.Buried Hearts concluded with a peak viewership rating of 15.4% (Nielsen Korea national standard), ranking second among miniseries aired in 2025.

Park also starred in the 2025 fantasy action superhero drama Twelve with Ma Dong-seok and an ensemble cast of Seo In-guk, Sung Dong-il, Lee Joo-bin, Ko Kyu-pil, Kang Mi-na, Sung Yoo-bin, Ahn Ji-hye, and Regina Lei. The drama revolves around the 12 angels and their struggles to protect the Korean Peninsula from evil spirits. It aired on KBS2 from August 23 to September 14, 2025.

In the same year, September 2025, Park released his first Japanese mini-album, Beginning. The album showcased 5 songs, including the title song, 恋しくて逢いたくて (Koishikute Aitakute). The songs on the album are rock and emotional ballads.

== Personal life ==
=== Military service ===
Park fulfilled his mandatory military service as an active-duty soldier in the Republic of Korea Army from June 10, 2019, until his discharge on January 4, 2021. After completing five weeks of basic training, he received a commendation from the training-center commander for exemplary conduct and was granted two nights and three days of reward leave. During his service, he was assigned to the Special Duty Team of the Military Police Group under the II Corps. He was officially discharged without returning to his unit after his final leave due to measures introduced during the COVID-19 pandemic.

== Other ventures ==
=== Ambassadorship ===
- 2012 Honorary Ambassador of Korea Tourism Organization
- 2012 Brand Ambassador of Pret-a-Porter Busan (Busan Fashion Week)

=== Business ===
In October 2021, Park established his own management agency, P&Studio, together with some of his long-time managers as a subsidiary of his former agency, UAA. Actor Sung Yoo-bin and part of UAA's staff moved to P&Studio along with Park. In August 2022, Gong Ji-ho, former member of girl group Oh My Girl, signed with the agency. In January 2025, rookie actress Han Ye-ji signed an exclusive contract with the agency.

In July 2025, Park left P&Studio and established his own one-man agency, Rêve, which means "dream" in French, with his manager who has been with him for over 10 years since his days with ZE:A. They were also together when P&Studio was founded.

== Discography ==
=== Extended plays ===
List of extended plays, with selected details, chart positions and sales
Title	Details	Peak chart positions	Sales
Title	Details	KOR	Sales
Beginning	Released: September 1, 2025 (JPN); Label: Warner Music Korea; Formats: CD, digital download, streaming	—	
"—" denotes releases that did not chart in that region.

=== Singles ===
Title	Year	Album
Japanese
"Koishikute Aitakute"	2025	Beginning

=== Soundtrack appearances ===
List of singles, with chart positions, showing year released, sales and album name
Title	Year	Peak chart positions	Sales (DL)	Album
Title	Year	KOR	Sales (DL)	Album
"Tomorrow Will Come"	2014	—	N/A	Bonnie & Clyde The Musical OST
"You're My Love"	2015	—	N/A	High Society OST
"I'll Be Here"	2017	—	N/A	Hwarang OST
"True Colors" (with Lee Sung-kyung)	2017	—	N/A	Trolls OST (Korean version)
"Because of You"	2017	85	KOR: 22,038	Strong Girl Bong-soon OST
"Two Lights"	2017	—	N/A	Two Lights: Relumino OST
"Bud"	2023	—	N/A	Our Blooming Youth OST
"Lean On Me"	2024	—	N/A	Doctor Slump OST
"—" denotes releases that did not chart in that region.

=== Songwriting credits ===
All credits are adapted from the Korea Music Copyright Association.

Song	Artist(s)	Writer(s)	Album	Year
"One"	ZE:A	Park Hyung-sik; Kevin; Urban Cllasik; E.One1	First Homme	2014
"One (Japanese Ver.)"	ZE:A J	Park Hyung-sik; Kevin; Urban Cllasik; E.One1; Hyn Sis	Roulette	2015
"Polaroid"	Park Hyung-sik; V Peakboy; Park Seo-joon; Choi Woo-shik	Park Hyung-sik; V Peakboy; Park Seo-joon; Choi Woo-shik	Non-album single	2022

== Filmography ==
Key
†	Denotes films that have not yet been released

=== Film ===
Year	Title	Role	Notes	Ref.
2011	Ronin Pop	Kin		
2013	Justin and the Knights of Valour	Justin	Voice; Korean dub	
2017	Trolls	Branch	Voice; Korean dub	
2017	Two Lights: Relúmĭno	In Soo	Short film	
2019	Juror 8	Kwon Nam-woo		
TBA	Family Force †	Cheol-hoon		

=== Television series ===
Year	Title	Role	Notes	Ref.
2010	Prosecutor Princess	Club man	Episode 2	
2010	Marry Me, Please	Trainee	Episode 18	
2010	Gloria	Trainee	Episodes 11, 14	
2012	I Remember You	Tae-song	KBS Drama Special	
2012	Dummy Mommy	Oh Soo-hyun		
2012	My Husband Got a Family	Popular idol group member	Episode 39	
2013	Sirius	Young Do Eun-chang / Do Shin-woo	KBS Drama Special	
2013	Nine	Young Park Sun-woo		
2013	The Heirs	Jo Myung-soo		
2014	What Happens to My Family?	Cha Dal-bong		
2015	Persevere, Goo Hae-ra	Student Cha Dal-bong	Episode 1	
2015	High Society	Yoo Chang-soo		
2015	She Was Pretty	Himself	Episode 9	
2016–2017	Hwarang: The Poet Warrior Youth	Kim Ji-dwi / Sam Maek-jong / King Jinheung		
2017	Strong Girl Bong-soon	Ahn Min-hyuk		
2018	Suits	Go Yeon-woo		
2021	Happiness	Jung Yi-hyun		
2022	Soundtrack #1	Han Seon-woo		
2023	Our Blooming Youth	Lee Hwan		
2023	Strong Girl Nam-soon	Ahn Min-hyuk	Cameo	
2024	Doctor Slump	Yeo Jeong-woo		
2025	Buried Hearts	Seo Dong-ju / Huh Seong-hyeon		
2025	Twelve	Ogwi		
TBA	Fall in! Love	Na Jeong-seok		

=== Television shows ===
Year	Title	Role	Ref.
2012	The Romantic & Idol	Cast member	
2013–2014	Real Men	Cast member	
2015	Law of the Jungle: Indochina	Cast member	
2022	In the Soop: Friendship Trip	Cast member	

=== Music video appearances ===
Year	Title	Artist	Ref.
2009	"Date"	Jewelry S	
2013	"Hot & Cold"	Jewelry	
2015	"Someday"	V.O.S	
2021	"Gyopo Hairstyle"	Peakboy	

== Musical theatre ==
Year	Title	Role	Ref.
2011	Temptation of Wolves	Ban Hae-won	
2013	Gwanghwamun Love Song	Ji-yong	
2013	Bonnie & Clyde	Clyde	
2013–2014	The Three Musketeers	D'Artagnan	
2016	The Three Musketeers	D'Artagnan	
2018–2019	Elisabeth	Der Tod	

== Accolades ==
=== Awards and nominations ===
Name of the award ceremony, year presented, category, nominee of the award, and the result of the nomination
Award ceremony	Year	Category	Nominee / Work	Result	Ref.
A-Awards (Arena Homme + and Mont Blanc Korea)	2015	Contemporary (Mont Blanc Homme) Award	Park Hyung-sik	Won	
APAN Star Awards	2014	Best New Actor	What's With This Family	Nominated	
APAN Star Awards	2018	Excellence Award, Actor in a Miniseries	Suits	Nominated	
APAN Star Awards	2025	Top Excellence Award, Actor in a Miniseries	Buried Hearts	Nominated	
Asia Top Awards	2023	Best Actor	Our Blooming Youth	Won	
Baeksang Arts Awards	2015	Best New Actor – Television	What's With This Family	Nominated	
Baeksang Arts Awards	2020	Best New Actor – Film	Juror 8	Nominated	
Blue Dragon Film Awards	2019	Best New Actor	Juror 8	Nominated	
Blue Dragon Film Awards	2019	Popular Star Award	Juror 8	Won	
Daegu International Musical Festival (DIMF)	2019	Best New Actor	Elisabeth	Nominated	
KBS Drama Awards	2014	Best New Actor	What's With This Family	Won	
KBS Drama Awards	2014	Best Couple Award	Park Hyung-sik (with Nam Ji-hyun); What's With This Family	Won	
KBS Drama Awards	2018	Excellence Award, Actor in a Miniseries	Suits	Nominated	
KBS Drama Awards	2018	Netizen Award	Suits	Won	
Korean Association of Film Critics Awards	2019	Best New Actor	Juror 8	Won	
MBC Entertainment Awards	2013	Best Male Newcomer in a Variety Show	Real Men	Won	
MBC Entertainment Awards	2014	Excellence Male Award in a Variety Show	Real Men	Nominated	
SBS Drama Awards	2015	Excellence Award, Actor in a Miniseries	High Society	Won	
SBS Drama Awards	2015	New Star Award	High Society	Won	
SBS Drama Awards	2015	Best Couple Award	Park Hyung-sik (with Lim Ji-yeon); High Society	Nominated	
SBS Drama Awards	2025	Grand Prize (Daesang)	Buried Hearts	Nominated	
SBS Drama Awards	2025	Top Excellence Award, Actor in a Miniseries Genre/Action Drama	Buried Hearts	Won	
SBS Drama Awards	2025	Best Couple Award	Park Hyung-sik (with Hong Hwa-yeon); Buried Hearts	Nominated	
Soompi Awards	2018	Best Couple Award	Park Hyung-sik (with Park Bo-young); Strong Girl Bong-soon	Won	
The Seoul Awards	2017	Popularity Award, Actor	Strong Girl Bong-soon	Won	

=== Listicles ===
Name of publisher, year listed, name of listicle, and placement
Publisher	Year	Listicle	Placement	Ref.
Forbes	2015	Korea Power Celebrity	38th	
