= Doctor Slump =

Doctor Slump may refer to:

- Doctor Slump (TV series), a South Korean television series
- Dr. Slump, a Japanese manga and anime series
