= Buried Hearts =

2025 South Korean television series

- Promotional poster
- Hangul: 보물섬
- Lit.: Treasure Island
- RR: Bomulseom
- MR: Pomulsŏm
- Genre: Revenge drama
- Written by: Lee Myung-hee
- Directed by: Jin Chang-gyu
- Starring: Park Hyung-sik; Huh Joon-ho; Lee Hae-young; Hong Hwa-yeon
- Music by: Kim Jang-woo; Ahn Ji-hye
- Opening theme: "Buried Hearts" by: Kim Jang-woo; Kim Seung-hyun
- Country of origin: South Korea
- Original language: Korean
- No. of episodes: 16

Production
- Executive producers: Hong Sung-chang; Kim Dong-jun; Jo Sung-wan; Jo Young-kwang (CP); Choi Joon-suk; Park Young-sun
- Producers: Kim Min-tae; Park Geon-won
- Cinematography: Kwak Sang-hoon; Lee Sang-joon
- Editor: Jeon Mi-sook
- Running time: 70 minutes
- Production companies: Studio S; A2Z Entertainment; Prumir Factory

Original release
- Network: SBS TV
- Release: February 21 – April 12, 2025

Buried Hearts (Korean: 보물섬) is a 2025 South Korean revenge drama television series written by Lee Myung-hee, directed by Jin Chang-gyu, and starring Park Hyung-sik, Huh Joon-ho, Lee Hae-young, and Hong Hwa-yeon. The series centered around a massive political slush fund and the intertwined fates of two men. It aired on SBS TV from February 21, to April 12, 2025, every Friday and Saturday at 22:00 (KST). It was the highest rated kdrama on SBS in 2025, and is available for streaming on Disney+ in selected regions.

== Synopsis ==
Seo Dong-ju is the secretive corporate secretary to Chairman Cha Kang-cheon and a Director at Daesan Group. After a betrayal by his love followed by an attempt on his life, he successfully hacks into a two trillion won political slush fund. But fate takes a cruel turn when he is attacked a second time by Heo Il Do, the son-in-law of the Chairman, who is unaware of the hacked money. Dong-ju loses his memory after surviving the second near death experience. This sets off a chain of events because of which Jang-seon realizes the money is missing and becomes determined to reclaim it.

== Cast ==
=== Main ===
- Park Hyung-sik as Seo Dong-ju / Huh Seong-hyeon

Executive Director and Team Leader of the Chairman's Office External Cooperation of Daesan Group.

- Huh Joon-ho as Yeom Jang-seon

A law school professor who is the real power behind the scenes controlling the Kingmaker.

- Lee Hae-young as Huh Il-do

CEO of Daesan Energy who is the son-in-law of Kang-cheon, chairman of Daesan Group.

- Hong Hwa-yeon as Yeo Eun-nam

A staff of Daesan Energy Seoul headquarters and Kang-cheon's granddaughter. Seo Dong-ju's love interest. Yeom Hui-cheol's arranged ex-wife.

=== Supporting ===
- Woo Hyun as Cha Kang-cheon

The second chairman of Daesan Group.

- Kim Jung-nan as Cha Deok-hui

The eldest daughter of Kang-cheon who remarried Il-do and took Eun-nam, her daughter from her first husband, Yeo Sunho.

- Do Ji-won as Ji Yeong-su

A bakery owner and bread chef who was a former news anchor. Ji Seon-u's mother.

- Hong Soo-hyun as Cha Guk-hee

CEO of Daesan Chemical and the second daughter of Gang-cheon.

- Kwon Soo-hyun as Yeom Hui-cheol

Prosecutor at Seoul District Prosecutors' Office who is Jang-seon's nephew and Yeo Eun-nam's husband.

- Yoon Sang-hyeon as Huh Tae-yun

A graduate student in business administration who is Il-do and Deok-hee's son.

- Cha Woo-min as Cha Seon-you

Seon-you is an aspiring baker who dropped out of high school. He is Yeong-su's son and the illegitimate son of Kang-cheon.

- Gong Ji-ho as Myeong Tae-geum

CEO of Sewoon Shopping Mall's Seoul Musical Instruments.

- Lee Yu-jun as Bae Won-bae

A worker at a port fisheries unloading station.

- Lee Hang-na as Seong Bo-yeon

Yeom Jang-seon's wife.

- Ha Su-ho as Kim Do-su

Head of the Department of Neurosurgery at Daesan Hospital who is Cha Guk-hui's husband.

- Seo Kyung-hwa as Gong Jeong-ja

The lady butler of Daesan family.

- Lee Seon-hee as Hyeon Ja-ok

Works at Daesan family. Do Jae-pil's wife.

- Song Jin-woo as Do Jae-pil

The head chef of Daesan family. Hyeon Ja-ok's husband.

- Kim Hak-sun as Kang Seong

A landscape architect who is Yi-hyeon's father. Huh Il-do's friend.

- Noh Susanna as Kang Yi-hyeon

A neurologist at Daesan Hospital who is Seong's daughter.

== Production ==
=== Development ===
Buried Hearts is a revenge drama written by Lee Myung-hee who wrote Money Flower (2017), directed by Jin Chang-gyu, and produced by A2Z Entertainment and Pureumir Factory. The first script reading was held on June 13, 2024.

=== Casting ===
On March 28, 2024, P&Studio stated to Joy News 24 that Park Hyung-sik had been confirmed to appear in the series, while Huh Joon-ho was positively considering it. On July 18, Yoon Sang-hyeon was reportedly confirmed his appearance. On September 13, the production team of the series announced that Park and Huh were officially confirmed to appear in the series. On October 2, it was reported that Hong Hwa-yeon had been cast and confirmed for her appearance after a fierce competition with odds of 100 to 1. On October 4, Gong Ji-ho confirmed her appearance. It was stated by Story J Company on October 10, that Kwon Soo-hyun had been cast to appear.

=== Filming ===
Principal photography began in the first half of 2024.

== Release ==
The series premiered on SBS TV on February 21, 2025, and aired on a Friday–Saturday timeslot at 22:00 (KST). It is also available for streaming on Disney+ in selected regions.

== Viewership ==
Buried Hearts : South Korea viewers per episode (millions)

Season	Episode number																Average
Season	1	2	3	4	5	6	7	8	9	10	11	12	13	14	15	16	Average
1	1.143	1.544	1.579	1.885	1.680	1.933	1.848	2.211	2.149	2.347	2.100	2.272	2.425	2.691	2.363	2.656	2.052

Source: Audience measurement performed nationwide by Nielsen Korea.

Average TV viewership ratings
Ep.	Original broadcast date	Average audience share (Nielsen Korea)	
Ep.	Original broadcast date	Nationwide	Seoul
1	February 21, 2025	6.1% (9th)	6.0% (8th)
2	February 22, 2025	8.1% (2nd)	7.8% (2nd)
3	February 28, 2025	8.8% (3rd)	8.9% (3rd)
4	March 1, 2025	10.2% (2nd)	9.8% (2nd)
5	March 7, 2025	9.2% (3rd)	9.0% (3rd)
6	March 8, 2025	11.2% (2nd)	11.0% (2nd)
7	March 14, 2025	10.9% (3rd)	10.4% (2nd)
8	March 15, 2025	12.3% (2nd)	12.3% (2nd)
9	March 21, 2025	12.2% (3rd)	12.2% (2nd)
10	March 22, 2025	13.1% (2nd)	13.0% (2nd)
11	March 28, 2025	11.7% (2nd)	11.9% (1st)
12	March 29, 2025	12.7% (2nd)	12.5% (2nd)
13	April 4, 2025	13.4% (1st)	14.0% (1st)
14	April 5, 2025	14.6% (2nd)	14.5% (2nd)
15	April 11, 2025	13.4% (1st)	13.6% (1st)
16	April 12, 2025	15.4% (2nd)	15.7% (2nd)
Average		11.5%	11.4%
In the table above, the blue numbers represent the lowest ratings and the red numbers represent the highest ratings.
