= Kim Joon-seok =

South Korean musician (born 1974)

- Born: March 31, 1974 (age 52); Seoul
- Genres: film, television
- Occupations: Composer; music director; Lecturer
- Years active: 1998–present
- Spouse: Jeong Se-rin

Korean name
- Hangul: 김준석
- RR: Gim Junseok
- MR: Kim Chunsŏk

Kim Joon-seok (Korean: 김준석; born March 31, 1974) is a South Korean composer and music director. He won the award for Best Music at the 2009 Chunsa Film Art Awards for his work on the film Lifting Kingkong (2009). For his work on the film Hi-Five (2025), he was nominated for Best Music at the 2025 Blue Dragon Film Awards and won Best Music at the 2025 Buil Film Awards.

His credits include the films Lifting King Kong, A Frozen Flower and Swing Kids (2008), and the television series Stranger (2017), My Mister (2018), The Penthouse: War in Life, Flower of Evil and Itaewon Class (2020), and The Glory (2022). He is the leader of the band Movie Closer.

== Personal life ==
Kim is married to Jeong Se-rin, a fellow music director. Jeong announced the marriage on her Instagram account, sharing photos taken by actress Moon Chae-won during a dinner outing with the three of them. The meeting followed the team's collaboration on the score for Flower of Evil, in which Moon starred.

== Filmography ==
Soundtrack list by Movie Closer, led by Kim Joon-seok and Jeong Se-rin.

=== Film ===
Year	Title	Notes	Ref.
1999	Nowhere to Hide	with Jo Seong-woo	
2001	Say Yes	with Jo Seong-woo	
2001	Take Care of My Cat	with Jo Seong-woo, Park Ki-heon	
2004	Once Upon a Time in High School		
2005	Mapado		
2005	Duelist	with Jo Seong-woo	
2005	The Art of Seduction		
2006	Cruel Winter Blues		
2007	Someone Behind You		
2007	Bank Attack		
2008	Crazy Waiting		
2008	Lovers of Six Years		
2008	The Chaser		
2009	Goodbye Mom		
2010	A Barefoot Dream		
2011	Unbowed		
2012	Howling		
2023	It's Okay!		
2025	Hi-Five		

=== Television series ===
Year	Title	Network	note	Ref.
2008	Star's Lover	SBS TV		
2008	My Sweet Seoul	SBS TV		
2009	Friend, Our Legend	MBC TV		
2009	Giant	SBS TV		
2011	Royal Family	MBC TV		
2012	I Do, I Do	MBC TV		
2012	Moon Embracing the Sun	MBC TV		
2012	The King's Doctor	MBC TV		
2013	Jang Ok-jung, Living by Love	SBS TV		
2013	Medical Top Team	MBC TV		
2014	Big Man	KBS2		
2014	Misaeng: Incomplete Life	tvN	with Park Seong-il	
2014	ugly love	KBS2	Drama Special	
2015	Beating Again	JTBC		
2015	Mask	SBS TV		
2015	She Was Pretty			
2016	Signal	tvN	with Park Seong-il	
2016	Flowers of the Prison	MBC TV		
2016	W	MBC TV		
2016	Woman with a Suitcase	MBC TV		
2017	Tunnel	OCN		
2017	Stranger	tvN		
2017	Save Me	OCN		
2017	Children of the 20th Century	MBC TV		
2017	Two Cops	MBC TV		
2017	I'm Not a Robot	MBC TV		
2018	Return	SBS TV		
2018	My Mister	tvN		
2018	Your Honor	SBS TV		
2018	Lovely Horribly	KBS2		
2018	100 Days My Prince	tvN		
2018	My Secret Terrius	MBC TV		
2018	Room No. 9	tvN	music director Jeong Se-rin	
2018	Top Star U-back	tvN		
2018	The Last Empress	SBS TV		
2018	Memories of the Alhambra	tvN	music director Jeong Se-rin	
2018	The Time	MBCTV	music director Jeong Se-rin	
2018	Mother	tvN	music director Jeong Se-rin	
2019	Item	MBC TV		
2019	Kill It	OCN		
2019	Confession	tvN		
2019	Save Me 2	OCN		
2019	Arthdal Chronicles	tvN		
2019	Justice	KBS2		
2019	When the Devil Calls Your Name	tvN		
2019	Secret Boutique	SBS TV	music director Jeong Se-rin	
2020	Find Me in Your Memory	MBC TV		
2020	Kkondae Intern	MBC TV		
2020	Stranger 2	tvN		
2020	Flower of Evil	tvN		
2020	Itaewon Class	JTBC	With Park Seung-il	
2020	Private Lives	JTBC		
2020	The Penthouse: War in Life	SBS TV		
2021	She Would Never Know	JTBC		
2021	The Penthouse: War in Life 2	SBS TV		
2021	The Penthouse: War in Life 3	SBS TV		
2021	Chimera	OCN		
2021	The One and Only		As a music director only	
2021	The Devil Judge	tvN	music director Jeong Se-rin	
2022	Ghost Doctor	tvN		
2022	Shooting Stars	tvN		
2022	Grid	Disney+		
2022	Insider	JTBC		
2022	Shaden Freude	JTBC	Episode 1	
2022	Love in Contract	tvN		
2022	Under the Queen's Umbrella	tvN		
2022	May I Help You?	MBC TV		
2022	Trolley	SBS TV		
2022	The Glory	Netflix		
2023	Queenmaker	Netflix		
2023	Delightfully Deceitful	tvN		
2023	Revenant	SBS TV		
2023	Celebrity	Netflix		
2023	The Escape of the Seven	SBS TV		
2023	The Kidnapping Day	ENA		
2024	Doctor Slump	JTBC		
2024	The Escape of the Seven 2	SBS TV	As a music director only	
2024	Blood Free	Disney+		
2024	Connection	SBS TV		
2024	Dongjae, the Good or the Bastard	TVING		
2024	Player	tvN		
2024	Namib	ENA		
2025	I Am a Running Mate	TVING	music director Koo Bon-choon	
2025	My Dearest Nemesis	tvN		
2025	The Witch	Channel A	As a music director only	
2025	Marry My Husband (私の夫と結婚して)	Prime Vidio	Japanese drama	
2025	Shin's Project	tvN		
2025	Surely Tomorrow	JTBC	Music director Jeong Se-rin	
2026	Honour	ENA		
2026	Filing for Love	tvN		
2026	The Legend of Kitchen Soldier	TVING	Ft. Koo Bon-choon	
2026	The East Palace	Netflix		
2026	Four Hands, Two Sonatas	tvN		
2026	Make Me Tingle	TVING		
2027	Awakening	SBS TV		
2027	The Koreans	Disney+		

=== Animated television ===
Year	Title	Notes	Ref.
2003	Spheres		

== Accolades ==
=== Accolades ===
Award	Year	Category	Recipient(s)	Result	Ref.
Blue Dragon Film Awards	2025	Best Music	Hi-Five	Nominated	
Buil Film Awards	2025	Best Music	Hi-Five	Won	
Chunsa Film Art Awards	2009	Best Music	Lifting Kingkong	Won	
