= Hong Hwa-yeon =

South Korean actress (born 1998)

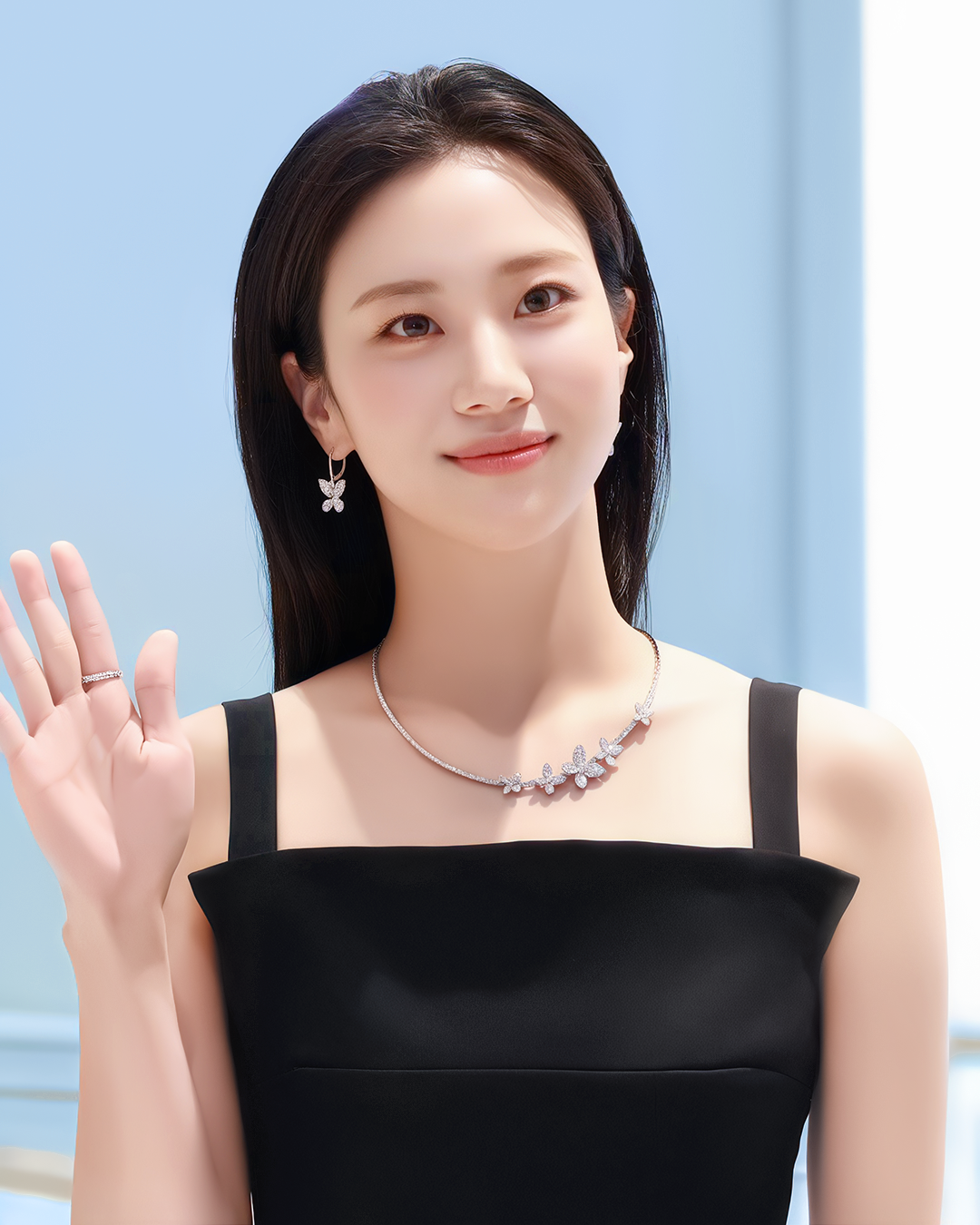
- Hong in March 2025
- Born: March 20, 1998 (age 28); Gyeonggi Province, South Korea
- Education: Konkuk University – Department of Education
- Occupations: Actress; model
- Years active: 2020–present
- Agent: BH Entertainment

Korean name
- Hangul: 홍화연
- RR: Hong Hwayeon
- MR: Hong Hwayŏn

Hong Hwa-yeon (Korean: 홍화연; born March 20, 1998) is a South Korean actress and model. Hong is best known for her portrayal of Yeo Eun-nam in the revenge drama Buried Hearts (2025).

== Education and career ==
Hong Hwa-yeon, who graduated from Konkuk University's Department of Education, debuted as a model in 2020 and first appeared in a music video. She signed with BH Entertainment the following year to pursue acting. Hong was also an advertising model for the global brand Burt's Bees as of 2022.

In 2022, Hong appeared in a supporting role in sports drama Mental Coach Jegal, thus marking her first role as an actress. Hong also appeared in web drama Only You that same year.

The following year, Hong was cast in 2023 romance-comedy drama True to Love.

Two years later, in February 2025, Hong was cast as the female lead alongside Park Hyung-sik in 2025 revenge drama Buried Hearts, marking her first female lead role of her career. Hong portrayed Yeo Eun-nam, the love interest of Seo Dong-ju (Park's character) and a chaebol chairman's granddaughter who sought to uncover the truth of her father's death and still loves Dong-ju despite her political marriage to another man. Hong reportedly auditioned for the character and was successfully cast as Eun-nam after a fierce competition with odds of 100 to 1. Hong's portrayal of Eun-nam garnered positive reviews and increased public attention. Culture critic Jeong Deok-hyeon regarded Eun-nam as the character who crucially triggered Dong-ju regain his ambition and struggle for revenge, and praised Hong for seamlessly playing the character and made a stood-out performance amongst her senior cast members who demonstrated weighty performances in the drama.

During the same year when she appeared in Buried Hearts, Hong was cast as high school girl Yoon Jeong-hee in 2025 political drama I Am a Running Mate. Hong was also cast as a supporting actress in Tastefully Yours, which also aired in 2025.

Hong appeared in the Netflix-produced web drama The Price of Confession, which aired in December 2025.

== Filmography ==
=== Television series ===
Key
| † | Denotes television productions that have not yet been released |

| Year | Title | Role | Notes | Ref. |
|---|---|---|---|---|
| 2022 | Mental Coach Jegal | Kim Moo-young | | |
| 2023 | True to Love | Bang Woo-ri | | |
| 2025 | Buried Hearts | Yeo Eun-nam | | |
| 2025 | Tastefully Yours | Jang Young-hye | | |
| 2025 | I Am a Running Mate | Yoon Jeong-hee | | |
| 2025 | The Price of Confession | Kang So-mang | Cameo | |
| 2026 | Filing for Love | Park Ah-jung | | |
| 2026 | Final Table | Choi Song-yi | | |
| TBA | Embassy for Foreign Monsters in Korea † | Go Mi-yoo | | |

=== Web series ===
| Year | Title | Role | Ref. |
|---|---|---|---|
| 2022 | Only You | Hyun Seul-gi | |

=== Music video appearances ===
| Year | Title | Artist | Ref. |
|---|---|---|---|
| 2020 | "Lower Your Expectations" | Sugarbowl | |
| 2022 | "Not About You" | Junny | |

== Awards and nominations ==
Name of the award ceremony, year presented, category, work of the nominee, and the result of the nomination
| Award ceremony | Year | Category | Work | Result | Ref. |
|---|---|---|---|---|---|
| APAN Star Awards | 2025 | Best New Actress | Buried Hearts, Tastefully Yours, I Am a Running Mate | Won | |
| Korea Drama Awards | 2025 | Best New Actress | Buried Hearts, Tastefully Yours, I Am a Running Mate | Won | |
| SBS Drama Awards | 2025 | Best New Actress | Buried Hearts | Won | |
