= Youn Sang-hyun =

South Korean actor (born 2002)

- Born: Busan, South Korea
- Education: Dongguk University
- Occupation: Actor
- Agent(s): HODU&U

Korean name
- Hangul: 윤상현
- RR: Yun Sanghyeon
- MR: Yun Sanghyŏn

Youn Sang-hyun (Korean: 윤상현; born in 2002) is a South Korean actor under HODU&U Entertainment. He made his acting debut through the TV series Under the Queen's Umbrella.

== Early life ==
Youn Sang-hyun was born in 2002, in Busan, South Korea. He attended a liberal arts high school and currently studying at the Department of Theater and Film in Dongguk University. He has one sister. Because of his father's business, they often moved from one place to another. Yoon then came to Seoul after enjoying the acting academy he attended in his first year of high school.

== Filmography ==
=== Film ===
Year	Title	Role	Ref.
2025	Love Untangled	Baek Seong-rae	
2026	Mad Dance Office	Hyun-deok	
TBA	Akgu: The Secret of the Moon Shadow	Min	

=== Television series ===
Year	Title	Role	Note(s)	Ref.
2023	Under the Queen's Umbrella	Prince Mu-ahn	Debut acting	
2024	Doctor Slump	Nam Ba-da		
2024	Good Partner	Park Seo-jin	(Episode 8)	
2024	Family by Choice	Lee Jun-ho		
2024	Marry You	Ju Dong-seok	(Episode 9–10)	
2025	Buried Hearts	Heo Tae-yoon		

=== Television shows ===
Year	Title	Role	Notes	Ref.
2025–2026	The Gentlemen's League	Regular member	Season 4	
2026	Deadly Tag	Cast member		

=== Music video appearances ===
Year	Song title	Artist	Ref.
2026	"I Like You" (니가 좋아)	Choi Seong-gon	
