= Lee Bong-jun =

South Korean actor (born 1995)

- Born: November 15, 1995 (age 30); South Korea
- Occupation: Actor
- Years active: 2020–present
- Agent: Lucky Company
- Height: 179 cm (5 ft 10 in)

Korean name
- Hangul: 이봉준
- RR: I Bongjun
- MR: I Pongjun
- Website: Official website

Lee Bong-jun (Korean: 이봉준; born November 15, 1995), is a South Korean actor. He is best known for his roles in Chief Detective 1958 (2024), I Am a Running Mate (2025), and Teach You a Lesson (2026).

== Career ==
Lee made his debut in the 2020 musical Jesus and has since been consistently active on stage in productions such as Werther, The Mad Hatter, and the play Bad Magnet. In 2022, Lee signed an exclusive contract with Lucky Company.

== Filmography ==
=== Television series ===
| Year | Title | Role | Notes | Ref. |
|---|---|---|---|---|
| 2021 | Youth of May | | Television debut | |
| 2022 | Alchemy of Souls | Goo Hyo | Season 1–2 | |
| 2022 | Extraordinary Attorney Woo | Kim Sang-hoon | | |
| 2022 | Reborn Rich | Moon Hyun Guk | | |
| 2023 | Dr. Romantic | Seok-gu's friend | Season 3 | |
| 2024 | Chief Detective 1958 | Jang Hee-seung | | |
| 2025 | The Witch | Hyun-cheol | | |
| 2025 | Resident Playbook | Nam Dong-eun | | |
| 2025 | I Am a Running Mate | Park Ji-hun | | |
| 2026 | Teach You a Lesson | Cho Gyu-cheol | | |

=== Musical ===
| Year | Title | Role | Notes | Ref. |
|---|---|---|---|---|
| 2020 | Jesus | | | |
| 2020 | Bare the Musical | | | |
| 2021 | Taeil | Taeil's voice | | |
| 2021 | Spring Awakening | | | |
| 2021 | Black Mary Poppins | | | |
| 2025 | Werther | Kains | | |

=== Stage play ===
| Year | Title | Role | Notes | Ref. |
|---|---|---|---|---|
| 2023 | Bad Magnet | | | |
| 2023 | Cafe Juenès | Lee Shin-woo | | |
