= Naeho Naengmyeon =

Historic noodle restaurant in Busan, South Korea

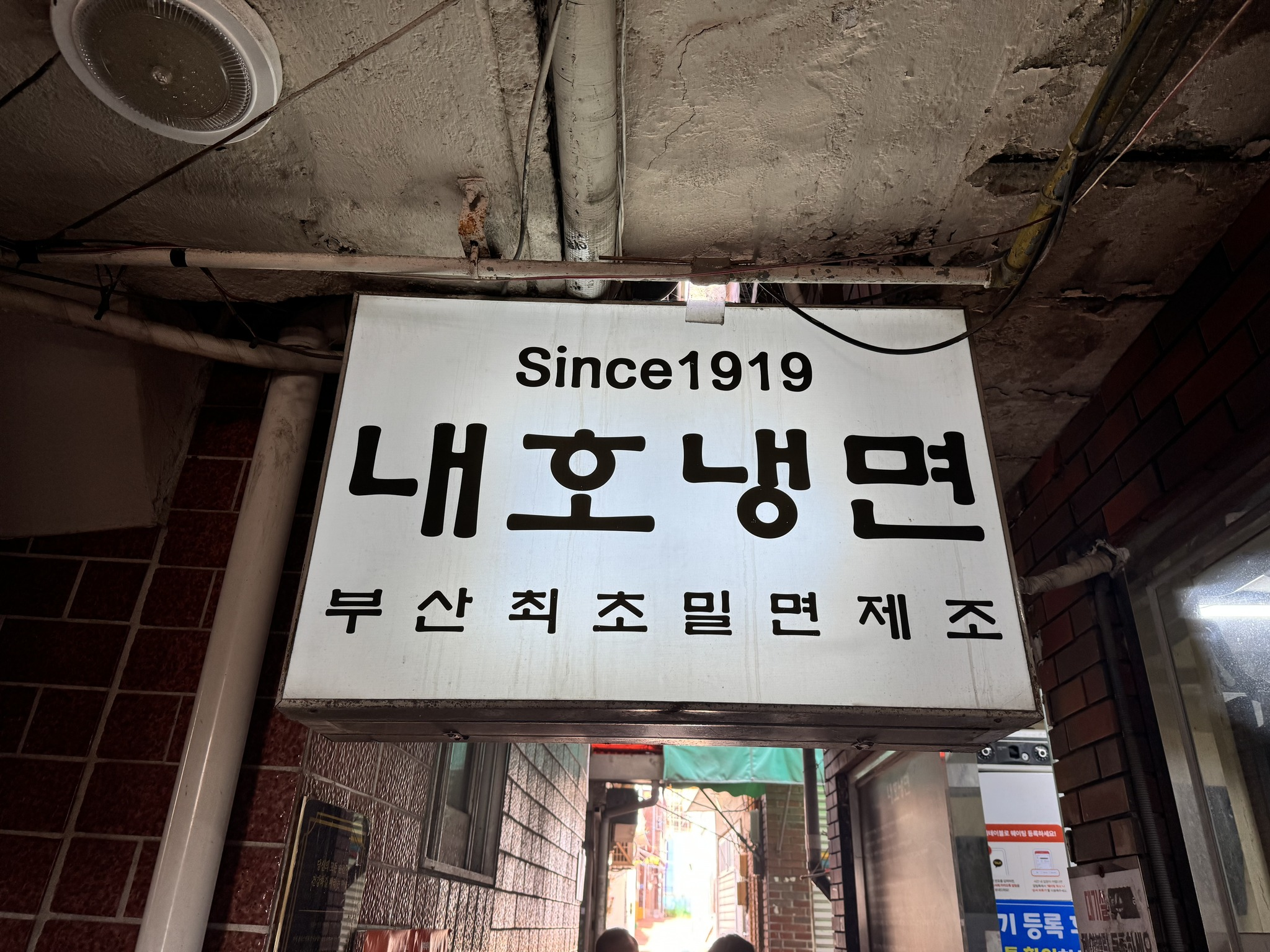
- Sign for the restaurant (2024)

Restaurant information
- Established: 1919; 106 years ago
- Owner: Yoo Jae-woo
- Food type: Korean cuisine, milmyeon, naengmyeon
- Location: 13-1 Uambeonyeong-ro 26beon-gil, Nam District, Busan, South Korea
- Coordinates: 35.1264°N 129.0708°E

Naeho Naengmyeon (Korean: 내호냉면; Hanja: 內湖冷麵) is a historic restaurant in Uam-dong, Nam District, Busan, South Korea. It is named for and serves the cold noodle dish naengmyeon, but is reportedly most famous for its claim as being the first restaurant to serve milmyeon in South Korea. The restaurant is among the oldest active restaurants in South Korea, having been founded in 1919, during the Japanese colonial period.

The restaurant was first founded in a small coastal village in what is now North Korea. In 1950, after the outbreak of the Korean War, the owning family fled to Busan as refugees. They reopened the business there in 1953. It has remained in the same location since then.

== History ==
The restaurant was originally founded in 1919 as Dongchun Myeonok (동춘면옥) by female restaurateur Lee Yeong-sun (이영순). It was originally located in Naeho-ri (내호리), Hungnam-bu, Kankyōnan Province, Korea, Empire of Japan (now Hamhung, North Korea). Jung Han-geum was the second-generation owner of the restaurant. The restaurant continued to operate there, through the colonial period and the 1945 division of Korea. In December 1950, after the outbreak of the Korean War, the family fled to Busan, South Korea as part of the Hungnam evacuation. The family sold snacks in order to prepare to reopen their restaurant. After raising enough money, they purchased a noodle machine. In March 1953, they reestablished the restaurant in Busan, this time with the new name Naeho Naengmyeon. The restaurant is named after their hometown, which they were reportedly homesick for and expected to soon return to.

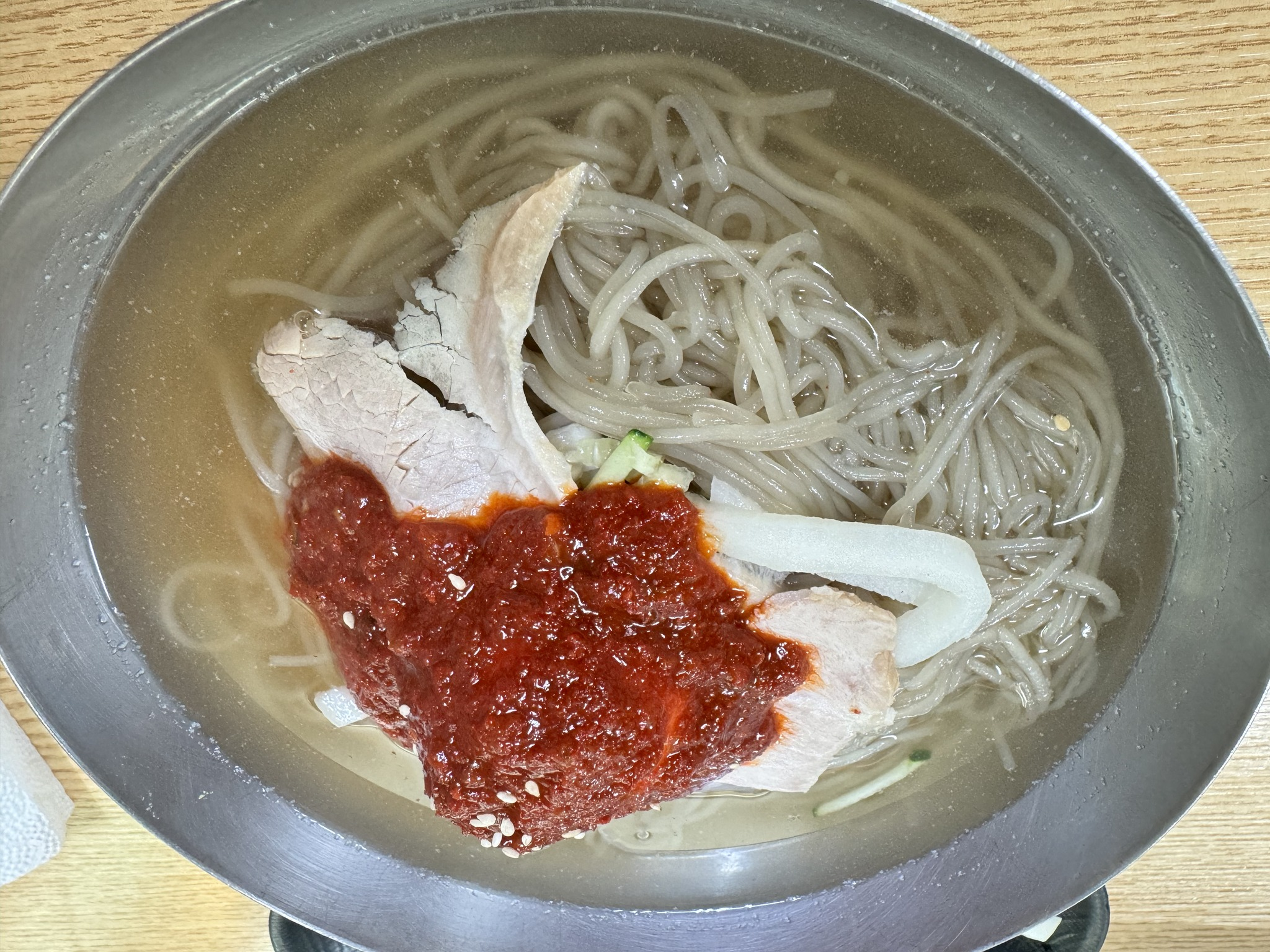
Milmyeon served in the restaurant (2024)

The restaurant was at first operated as one of the many temporary refugee shacks in the city. The shack reportedly had no chairs and used wooden boxes for tables. It had space for five to ten guests at a time. They adapted the noodle recipe to their circumstances. Instead of the traditional potato starch, they used wheat flour, which was rationed out by the United States Army. In addition, they made the dish more spicy and salty, to appeal to the tastes of people from Gyeongsang Province. Their dish reportedly soon attracted national attention. It began to be sold in other restaurants in the city, and became seen as a local specialty of Busan. By 2024, there were around 500 milmyeon restaurants in the city. The restaurant grew to several times its original size, by purchasing adjacent properties. In 1975, third generation owner Lee Chun-bok took over the business.

By 2023, Yoo Jae-woo was the fourth generation of the family to be running the restaurant. It was reported that the noodles used around 70% wheat flower and 30% sweet potato starch around that time.

=== Invention of milmyeon ===
Whether the restaurant is the first to serve milmyeon has been disputed. There are a number of theories for how the dish came about. One theory is that the dish organically developed among the North Korean refugee population due to their shared circumstances in Busan at the time. Another theory is that the dish originated in the nearby city of Jinju and spread to Busan, although one reporter expressed doubt on this theory.
