= Lee Jung-shik =

South Korean actor and model

Lee Do-yun
- Born: Lee Jung-sic; July 6, 1995 (age 31); Samcheok, Gangwon, South Korea
- Other names: Lee Jung-sic, Lee Jung-sik
- Education: Myongji University
- Occupations: Actor; model
- Years active: 2016–present
- Agent: Namoo Actors

Korean name
- Hangul: 이정식
- Hanja: 李廷湜
- RR: I Jeongsik
- MR: I Chŏngsik
- Website: namooactors.com

Lee Jung-sic (Korean: 이정식; born July 6, 1995), who began using the stage name Lee Do-yun (이도윤) in 2025, is a South Korean actor and model. He is best known for his starring roles in the web series I Have Three Boyfriends (2019) and Summer Guys (2021).

== Early life and education ==
He was born on July 6, 1995. After completing his studies from Myongji University, he signed with agency Namoo Actors in 2016. He made his debut in 2016 appearing in My Little Princess song Because Of You which made him noted by the audience.

== Career ==
He did modeling for magazines and comerciales for Kakao Bank, Cosmetic Smoothie and Clothing Brand XESS it gained him more attention. In 2019 he made his debut as actor by starring in four dramas and appearing in DeAid's Changed song. He appeared on Farming Academy by playing a supporting role and in the same year he starred in drama I Have Three Boyfriends which was his first lead role which gained him a lot of more attention. He reprise his role of Lee Hae-seung of Farming Academy 2 in 2019. He starred in drama Love with Flaws by playing a supporting of a University student which attracted him attention from the audience.

On September 18, 2025, Lee announced on his personal social media that he would begin using the stage name Lee Do-yun for his acting career.

== Filmography ==
=== Television ===
Year	Title	Role	Ref.
2019	Farming Academy	Lee Hae-seung	
2019	I Have Three Boyfriends	Geon Woo	
2019	Farming Academy 2	Lee Hae-seung	
2019	Love with Flaws	University Student	
2021	Summer Guys	Ma Tae-ho	
2022	Tracer	Kim Young-tae	
2022	Dear.M	Moon Joon	
2022	Tracer Season 2	Kim Young-tae	
2025	Hyper Knife	Ha U-yeong	

=== Web series ===
Year	Title	Role	Ref.
2025	I Am a Running Mate	Kwak Sang-hyun	

=== Music video appearances ===
Year	Song title	Artist	Ref.
2016	"Blooming Day"	Bloomy	
2016	"Because of you"	Blue Me	
2019	"Changed"	DeAid	
