= Final Table =

2026 South Korean television series

- Promotional poster
- Hangul: 파이널 테이블
- RR: Paineol teibeul
- MR: P'ainŏl t'eibŭl
- Genre: Cooking; Slice of life
- Written by: Kim Do-hoon
- Directed by: Kim Do-hoon
- Starring: Ahn Hyo-seop; Hong Hwa-yeon; Chang Ryul; Jung Yoo-jin
- Country of origin: South Korea
- Original language: Korean
- No. of episodes: 10

Production
- Production companies: SLL; B.A. Entertainment; DZoongFilm

Original release
- Network: JTBC
- Release: October 24, 2026 – present

Final Table (Korean: 파이널 테이블) is an ongoing South Korean cooking slice-of-life television series written and directed by Kim Do-hoon, and starring Ahn Hyo-seop, Hong Hwa-yeon, Chang Ryul, and Jung Yoo-jin. The series centers around The Table: K-Chef 2026, a fictional survival competition where Korean chefs from across the globe compete to be named the best Korean cook. It premiered on JTBC on October 24, 2026, and airs every Saturday and Sunday at 22:40 (KST). It is also available for streaming on Amazon Prime Video.

== Synopsis ==
Set against the backdrop of The Table: K-Chef 2026, a global cooking survival competition organized to find the top Korean culinary talent, and follows Korean chefs from all over the world as they showcase their culinary arts and confront personal struggles. Kang Han is an overseas-trained chef who guards a secretive past. After an unexpected event, he becomes the head chef of restaurant Familia and enters the competition alongside hall manager Choi Song-yi. As the tournament unfolds under general manager Seon Jeong-won, Han faces off against rival chefs such as Cha Woo-jin, the executive chef of the prestigious restaurant Exception. Meanwhile, a tense corporate rivalry brews within Pyeongyeon Group, South Korea's premier food industry conglomerate, where Chairman Moon Hae-seon clashes with her ambitious half-sister Baek Hyeon-joo.

== Cast and characters ==
- Ahn Hyo-seop as Kang Han / Chris K., an overseas-trained chef who has traveled worldwide
- Hong Hwa-yeon as Choi Song-yi, the dining room manager of the restaurant Familia
- Chang Ryul as Cha Woo-jin, the executive chef of the elite restaurant Exception
- Jung Yoo-jin as Seon Jeong-won, the general producer of the survival competition The Table: K-Chef 2026
- Jang Young-nam as Moon Hae-seon, the chairwoman of the Pyungyeon Group, South Korea's top food service conglomerate
- Cha Ji-yeon as Baek Hyun-joo, Hae-seon's half-sister who harbors ambitions for leadership

== Production ==
=== Development ===
JTBC announced the production of Final Table, written and directed by Kim Do-hoon, and produced by SLL, B.A. Entertainment, and DZoongFilm. According to the production team, the series incorporates a "variety show" format within the fictional competition The Table: K-Chef 2026, intended to blend traditional drama storytelling with the aesthetic of a reality cooking program.

The script reading session for the series was publicly unveiled in September 2026. Industry media noted it as a major tentpole project for JTBC amid restructuring and corporate sale procedures in late 2026, with the network leaning on the established popularity of lead actor to boost viewership and content competitiveness.

=== Casting ===
In September 2025, it was reported that Ahn Hyo-seop was in talks to star in the series. In March 2026, Hong Hwa-yeon was cast as the female lead. By March 23, Ahn, Hong, Chang Ryul, and Jung Yoo-jin were confirmed to play various lead roles.

== Release ==
In July 2026, The Final Table was reported to premiere in October 2026 on JTBC's Saturday–Sunday time slot. Two months later, JTBC confirmed that the series would premiere on October 24, at 22:40 (KST). It is also available for streaming internationally on Amazon Prime Video.

== Viewership ==
Final Table : South Korea viewers per episode (thousands)

Season	Episode number												Average
Season	1	2	3	4	5	6	7	8	9	10	11	12	Average
1	469	536	555	608	498	407	355	453	427	TBD	TBD	TBD	TBD

Source: Audience measurement performed nationwide by Nielsen Korea.

Average TV viewership ratings
Ep.	Original broadcast date	Average audience share (Nielsen Korea)	
Ep.	Original broadcast date	Nationwide	Seoul
1	October 24, 2026	1.9% (3rd)	1.9% (2nd)
2	October 25, 2026	2.4% (1st)	2.7% (1st)
3	October 31, 2026	2.2% (2nd)	2.0% (2nd)
4	November 1, 2026	2.7% (1st)	3.0% (1st)
5	November 7, 2026	1.9% (3rd)	1.7% (3rd)
6	November 8, 2026	1.8% (5th)	1.8% (3rd)
7	November 14, 2026	1.7% (7th)	1.4% (7th)
8	November 15, 2026	1.9% (3rd)	1.9% (3rd)
9	November 21, 2026	1.8% (2nd)	1.6% (4th)
10	November 22, 2026		
11	November 28, 2026		
12	November 29, 2026		
Average		—	—
In the table above, the blue numbers represent the lowest ratings and the red numbers represent the highest ratings.
