= Doctor Slump (TV series) =

2024 South Korean television series

- Hangul: 닥터슬럼프
- RR: Dakteo seulleompeu
- MR: Takt'ŏ sŭllŏmp'ŭ
- Genre: Medical drama; Romantic comedy
- Written by: Baek Seon-woo
- Directed by: Oh Hyun-jong
- Starring: Park Hyung-sik; Park Shin-hye; Yoon Park; Kong Seong-ha
- Music by: Kim Joon-seok; Jeong Se-rin
- Country of origin: South Korea
- Original language: Korean
- No. of episodes: 16

Production
- Executive producers: Kim Se-ah; Kim Da-hee; Lee Soo-bum
- Producers: Han Suk-won; Hwang Gi-yong
- Cinematography: Kim Sun-cheol; Song Hyun-joon
- Editor: Oh Selena
- Running time: 61–74 minutes
- Production companies: SLL; HighZium Studio

Original release
- Network: JTBC
- Release: January 27 – March 17, 2024

Doctor Slump (Korean: 닥터슬럼프) is a 2024 South Korean medical romantic comedy television series written by Baek Seon-woo, directed by Oh Hyun-jong, and starring Park Hyung-sik, Park Shin-hye, Yoon Park, and Kong Seong-ha. The series depicts the lives of two former high school rivals who reunite during the lowest points of their respective careers.

Produced under SLL and HighZium Studio, principal photography took place in Seoul, Busan, and Pyeongchang between March and October 2023. The series aired on JTBC from January 27, to March 17, 2024, every Saturday and Sunday at 22:30 (KST). It is also available for streaming on TVING in South Korea and on Netflix internationally.

Doctor Slump received positive reviews for its sensitive portrayal of mental health, burnout, and the chemistry between the lead actors, Park Hyung-sik and Park Shin-hye, marking their first collaboration since the 2013 SBS TV series The Heirs. The series was also a commercial success, reaching a peak nationwide viewership of 8.2% on Nielsen Korea. It also gained significant international popularity, ranking first on the Netflix Global Top 10 list for non-English television series and remained on the charts for nine consecutive weeks.

== Plot ==
Yeo Jeong-woo and Nam Ha-neul, former top students who became successful doctors, suffer major setbacks in their careers at the same time. In high school, the two were rivals who competed for the top rank in the national mock exams. Jeong-woo was popular and excelled with little effort, while Ha-neul gave up most other activities to focus on her studies.

Fourteen years later, Jeong-woo has become a star plastic surgeon with a flawless reputation and a massive social media following. However, his life is upended when a mysterious medical accident during a routine surgery leads to the death of a patient—the girlfriend of a powerful casino mogul. Framed by a conspiracy and facing a 10-billion-won lawsuit, Jeong-woo loses his clinics, his wealth, and his public standing. Destitute and traumatized, he is forced to move into a humble rooftop room.

Simultaneously, Ha-neul has become a highly skilled anesthesiologist at a prestigious university hospital. Despite her brilliance, she is treated as a doormat by a narcissistic senior professor who steals her research and subjects her to verbal abuse. The cumulative stress of her "burnout" lifestyle eventually manifests as clinical depression. After a near-fatal incident where she almost collapses into traffic from exhaustion, Ha-neul realizes she can no longer function. She quits her job, much to the horror of her mother, who struggles to understand how a "successful doctor" could be mentally ill.

The two former rivals reunite when Jeong-woo unknowingly rents the rooftop room of the building owned by Ha-neul's family. Initially, their reunion is marked by the same petty bickering that defined their teenage years. However, as they navigate their respective "slumps", they find that they are the only people capable of providing true comfort to one another.

As Ha-neul undergoes therapy to reclaim her life, she helps Jeong-woo investigate the medical malpractice case that ruined him. Together, they discover a web of surveillance and betrayal involving a close colleague. Ultimately, the series chronicles their journey of healing, proving that a professional "slump" can serve as a necessary pause to rediscover personal happiness and a life beyond their medical licenses.

== Cast and characters ==
=== Main ===
- Park Hyung-sik as Yeo Jeong-woo
  - Seo Woo-jin as young Yeo Jeong-woo

A plastic surgeon who achieved academic and professional success early in life due to his academic aptitude, graduating from South Korea's top medical school and gaining public recognition through a documentary about his overseas volunteer work performing reconstructive surgeries. He views plastic surgery as a means to improve patients' self-esteem and quality of life, a philosophy that helped him build a prominent public profile and co-found a medical YouTube channel that earned a Gold Creator Award. However, his career faces a crisis when a patient dies during a facial contouring surgery under mysterious circumstances, complicated by the unexplained failure of the operating room's CCTV cameras during the procedure. Struggling to cope with the sudden downfall and seeking escape from public scrutiny, he unexpectedly reunites with Ha-neul, his intense academic rival from his school years.

- Park Shin-hye as Nam Ha-neul
  - Yu Ha-yeon as young Nam Ha-neul

An anesthesiologist who was recognized as an academic prodigy from a young age in Busan, consistently ranking at the top of her school through extreme, self-sacrificing study habits and eventually scoring first in the nation on a high school mock examination. Driven by a strong competitive nature and the belief that temporary self-deprivation would secure her future happiness, she eschewed social relationships and leisure to focus entirely on her education, leading her family to relocate to Seoul where she encountered her academic rival, Jeong-woo, before successfully entering medical school. Despite achieving her goal of becoming a doctor, the prolonged psychological strain and lack of work-life balance eventually cause her to experience severe burnout, prompting her to abruptly resign from her position to re-evaluate her life. Unaccustomed to leisure and struggling to adapt to free time, her routine shifts when Jeong-woo unexpectedly moves into the rooftop apartment of her family's building. Although they initially resume their high school animosity, Ha-neul develops empathy for Jeong-woo upon witnessing his night terrors and isolating legal battles stemming from a mysterious medical malpractice incident, leading her to provide emotional and legal support while he teaches her how to relax, which gradually transitions their rivalry into mutual romantic interest.

- Yoon Park as Bin Dae-yeong

A plastic surgeon running La Beaute Plastic Surgery Clinic in Gangnam, though his practice struggles financially despite his attempts to attract patients through billboard advertisements and a personal lifestyle vlog on YouTube. As a university classmate who is older than Jeong-woo due to entering medical school late, Dae-yeong harbors a complex mix of envy and affection toward his more successful peer; though he initially leaves malicious online comments out of jealousy rooted in a past misunderstanding from their college days, he defends Jeong-woo against public backlash and assists in his eventual professional return after Jeong-woo's downfall. Additionally, Dae-yeong is a single father raising a middle-school-aged daughter following a difficult divorce from his wealthy ex-wife, whose family subjected him to demanding personal requests. While struggling with the challenges of raising a teenage daughter alone, he develops a mutual support system with Hong-ran, a neighboring gynecologist who helps him navigate parenting dilemmas while he assists with her young son.

- Kong Seong-ha as Lee Hong-ran

An obstetrician and gynecologist, a university classmate of Ha-neul, and her closest friend since their residency. She is a divorced single mother raising her six-year-old son, struggles to balance her demanding medical career—which involves frequent night calls—with her efforts to fill the absence of a father for her child. Due to her schedule, her mother cares for her son during the week, while Hong-ran takes over on weekends, often finding herself unable to fulfill certain requests like taking him to gender-segregated public baths or participating in activities she dislikes, such as insect collecting. Despite her heavy drinking habits and aggressive socialization style, she was the one who initially initiated contact with the solitary Ha-neul, forming a lasting bond. In her professional vicinity, she repeatedly crosses paths with Dae-young, a divorced plastic surgeon operating a clinic across from hers, after discovering his YouTube channel and experiencing an accidental introduction that eventually leads them to support each other through their respective personal shortcomings.

- Oh Dong-min as Min Kyung-min

A medical professional who shares close connections with both Jeong-woo and Ha-neul. He originally met Jeong-woo while working as his medical student tutor during Jeong-woo's senior year of high school, eventually becoming a close, familial figure to him and later working dedicatedly to help clear Jeong-woo's name following his medical malpractice crisis. Professionally, Kyung-min also served as a hospital senior to Ha-neul and Hong-ran during their residency. Due to his kind demeanor and professional competence, he earned the deep respect of the otherwise reserved Ha-neul, leading others to perceive a romantic connection between them and leaving Ha-neul with lasting memories of their past interactions.

=== Supporting ===
Ha-neul's family

- Jang Hye-jin as Kong Wol-seon

A single mother who gave birth to her daughter, Ha-neul, at nineteen, and values the youthful, close relationship she shares with her children while living with her late husband's family. Her primary source of pride and fulfillment is Ha-neul's career as a doctor, which helps mitigate other family stressors, including her late husband's absence and her nearly thirty-year-old son's prolonged unemployment. However, Wol-seon faces an emotional challenge when Ha-neul is diagnosed with depression, transitioning from initial denial to acceptance as she focuses on supporting her daughter's mental health recovery.

- Yoon Sang-hyeon as Nam Ba-da

Ha-neul's younger brother. Unlike his academically successful sister, Ba-da possesses neither an aptitude nor an interest in studying, operating under the belief that one top student per household is sufficient. Officially an unemployed job seeker, he lacks the ambition to find employment and instead hopes to inherit his mother's building to live comfortably, maintaining a cheerful attitude despite regular criticism from his mother and sister. To attract romantic interest, he intentionally alters his dialect depending on whether he is speaking to women from Seoul or Busan. Following Ha-neul's burnout and subsequent unemployment, Ba-da finds amusement in the situation, jokingly arguing that he is the more dutiful child for never raising their family's expectations in the first place.

- Hyun Bong-sik as Kong Tae-seon

Ha-neul's maternal uncle, who runs a milmyeon restaurant on the ground floor of their building after learning the craft as a kitchen assistant at a top restaurant in Busan. Despite his imposing build and strong regional dialect, he is dedicated to his business, maintaining strict quality controls such as refusing to offer delivery to prevent the noodles from getting soggy. Having never married, he moved to Seoul alongside his family to help support Ha-neul and her brother, Ba-da, serving as a paternal figure in their father's absence.

- Nam Gwon-a as Nam Suk-ja, Ha-neul's eldest aunt
- Lee Min-young as Ha-neul's younger aunt

People of Yeongwon High School

- Jeong Ji-sun as Han Sang-chul

Jeong-woo and Haneul's former third-year high school homeroom teacher. Proud of having taught two students who simultaneously ranked first in the nation during the same school year, he frequently reminisces about the experience and boasts to his subsequent students about his connection to them.

- Park Won-ho as Kim Mu-geun

Jeong-woo's friend who did not excel academically but maintained a close relationship with him through shared everyday activities. He takes great pride in his friend's academic achievements, particularly when Jeong-woo ranked first nationwide.

- Kang Sang-jun as Son Chan-yeong

Jeong-woo's friend who performed marginally better academically than Mu-geun, their grades were largely comparable. Despite spending his time doing the same activities as Jeong-woo—such as eating tteokbokki and playing arcade games—Chan-yeong frequently felt envious that Jeong-woo consistently managed to rank first in the nation while he did not.

Others

- Song Ji-woo as Do Hye-ji

A nurse at La Beaute Plastic Surgery Clinic and was the sole founding staff member to join him when the practice first opened. She frequently criticizes and strictly manages Dae-young to compensate for his clumsy demeanor, acting as a crucial stabilizing force responsible for keeping the clinic financially viable and sustaining his low video subscriber count. While her harsh reprimands often make her appear more like an online troll than an ally, her deep involvement in his professional survival leaves open the question of whether her motivations are entirely strictly professional.

- Kim Jae-beom as Kang Jin-seok

An anesthesiologist who went into surgery that triggers Jeong-woo's downfall. Characterized by his unreadable expressions and unbothered composure regardless of the scale of an event, he repeatedly provokes suspicion from Jeong-woo, notably by being the only individual involved who refuses to comply with the police investigation.

- Oh Ryoong as Professor Kim (Kim Sang-geun), an anesthesiologist professor
- Kwon Hee-wook as the Macau boss
- Lee Ha-joo as Nurse Oh, a nurse at Login Plastic Surgery Clinic
- Jeong Ye-seo as Nurse Park, a nurse at Login Plastic Surgery Clinic
- Kim Jung-hwan as Doctor Woo, Ha-neul's classmate
- Jang Yi-jung as an intern
- Park Jung-won as the PR manager at La Beaute Plastic Surgery Clinic
- Hwang Do-yun as Bin Eun-jeong, Dae-yeong's daughter
- Kim Hee-seong as Jin-woo, Hong-ran's son
- Han Kyu-won as Kwak Jae-yeong

=== Special appearances ===
- Park Won-sang as Nam Man-seok, Ha-neul's deceased father
- Lee Seung-joon as the psychiatrist who diagnoses Ha-neul with burnout and depression
- Jang In-sub as Jeong-woo and Dae-yeong's colleague
- Cha Yong-hak as a prosecutor involved in the legal proceedings regarding Jeong-woo's medical malpractice case
- Jeon Yi-soo as the patient from Macau who dies while having a facial contouring in Jeong-woo's clinic
- Kim Il-joong as a news anchor
- Kim Ha-eun as a news anchor
- Lee Sung-kyung as Han Woo-ri, a former classmate and has a crush on Jeong-woo
- Kim Seung-hye as Oh Ji-eun
- Mi Ram as Da-bin

== Production ==
=== Development and casting ===
The development of Doctor Slump began under the direction of Oh Hyun-jong, known for his work on Weightlifting Fairy Kim Bok-joo (2016), and writer Baek Seon-woo, whose previous credits include What's Wrong with Secretary Kim (2018). Produced by SLL and HighZium Studio, the series was envisioned as a "medical-human" drama that focused more on the psychological recovery and "slump" of its protagonists rather than traditional hospital politics. The project was initially slated for an October 2023 release on JTBC but was later moved to the first quarter of 2024 to anchor the network's weekend lineup. The first script reading was held on March 4, 2023, where the creative team established the show's tone as a blend of nostalgic romantic comedy and modern-day healing drama.

Casting garnered significant media interest as it marked the first on-screen reunion between leads Park Shin-hye and Park Hyung-sik in eleven years, following their roles in the 2013 teen drama The Heirs. The project also served as a high-profile comeback for Park Shin-hye, marking her return to the screen after a two-year hiatus following her marriage and the birth of her first child. By March 2023, the main cast was rounded out by Yoon Park and Kong Seong-ha, who were cast to portray the secondary lead couple. Park Won-sang and Lee Sung-kyung were cast to make a special appearances. Lee's casting was due to her professional relationship with director Oh, with whom she previously worked on the 2016–2017 MBC TV series Weightlifting Fairy Kim Bok-joo.

=== Filming ===
Principal photography took place between March and October 2023. To capture the contrast between the characters' past academic success and their present-day struggles, the production utilized a mix of historic and scenic locations across South Korea. The high school flashback sequences were filmed at the historic Choong Ang High School in Seoul. To emphasize the "healing" theme of the series, several pivotal scenes were shot in nature-centric locations, including the Samyang Roundhill ranch in Pyeongchang, as well as the coastal areas of Gaetmaeul Beach and Yongho Starlight Park in Busan. Campus settings in Soonchunhyang University in Asan served as the spring backdrop for multiple sequences; the staircase next to the Hakseongsa Hall 2 dormitory was used for the scene where the characters share their drunken confessions, while the school's cherry blossom-lined Phoenix Square was the site of their high school racing scene. Urban filming took place at various landmarks in Seoul, such as the Deoksugung Palace Stone-wall Road and the Yeouido Saetgang Ecological Park bridge, providing a grounded, contemporary atmosphere for the characters' adult lives.

== Original soundtrack ==
The soundtrack of the series was led by music directors Kim Joon-seok and Jung Se-rin. It featured a diverse lineup of artists, including Seulgi of Red Velvet, Hynn, Chen of Exo, Junggigo, Dayoung of WJSN, and Eden. Notably, lead actor Park Hyung-sik contributed to the soundtrack with the ballad "Lean on Me" (내게 기대), marking his participation in the series as both a performer and vocalist.

=== Album ===
Doctor Slump (Original Television Soundtrack)

Soundtrack album by Various artists
- Released: March 19, 2024
- Length: 136:25
- Language: Korean
- Label: SLL

Singles from Doctor Slump (Original Television Soundtrack)
- 1. "In My Memory" Released: January 27, 2024; 2. "Not Alone" Released: February 3, 2024; 3. "The Way to Love Myself" Released: February 10, 2024; 4. "Actually I Love You" Released: February 24, 2024; 5. "Love Is" Released: March 2, 2024; 6. "Lean on Me" Released: March 10, 2024

Doctor Slump soundtrack album was released on March 19, 2024; it contains all of the singles and background tracks from the series.

CD1
| No. | Title | Lyrics | Music | Artist | Length |
|---|---|---|---|---|---|
| 1. | "In My Memory" (기억속에 너와) | Lee Ki-hwan; Eunlim (Kiple) | Lee Ki-hwan; Eunlim | Seulgi | 3:25 |
| 2. | "Not Alone" (혼자가 아니야) | Taibian; Kim Jung-woo (Toxic); An Gam-dok | Taibian; Kim Jung-woo (Toxic); An Gam-dok | Hynn | 4:12 |
| 3. | "The Way to Love Myself" (나 사랑법) | Lee Chi-hoon | Park Sung-il | Chen | 3:29 |
| 4. | "Actually I Love You" (사실 너를) | Inwoo | Inwoo | Junggigo | 3:45 |
| 5. | "Love Is" (사랑한다는 말은) | Purple Park | Purple Park; Inwoo | Dayoung (WJSN), Eden | 3:11 |
| 6. | "Lean on Me" (내게 기대) | Shim Gyu-tae; Kim Jae-won; Jay Lee | Jay Lee; Shim Gyu-tae; Kim | Park Hyung-sik | 3:26 |
| 7. | "Title of Doctor Slump" (Title Of 닥터슬럼프) | | Jung Se-rin | | 0:35 |
| 8. | "How to Remember Pain Briefly and Memories Long" (아픔은 짧게 추억은 오래 기억하는 법) | | Jung Se-rin | | 4:27 |
| 9. | "You're the Reason I Can Hold Out" (너 때문에 버텨) | | Jung Se-rin | | 2:41 |
| 10. | "A Fearless Woman" (위풍당당 남하늘) | | No Yoo-rim | | 2:17 |
| 11. | "I Can't Believe I'm Not First Place" (내가 1등이 아니라니) | | Jung Se-rin | | 2:43 |
| 12. | "Study Bulldozer" (공부 불도저) | | Shim Hee-jin | | 2:01 |
| 13. | "Looking Inside My Mind" (마음 들여다보기) | | Jung Se-rin | | 2:36 |
| 14. | "PTSD" (의료사고) | | Jung Se-rin | | 2:58 |
| 15. | "Love Hate" (혐관 로맨스) | | Kim Tae-jin | | 1:53 |
| 16. | "I Feel Alone" (나 홀로인 것 같은 기분) | | Gu Bon-chun | | 2:43 |
| 17. | "Stalker" (스토커) | | Kim Tae-jin | | 2:43 |
| 18. | "Fake Evidence" (만들어진 증거) | | Lee Se-yeon | | 3:20 |
| 19. | "A Moment of Anticipation" (설렘의 순간) | | Lee Yoon-ji | | 1:47 |
| 20. | "Celebrity Doctor" (스타 의사) | | Son Sung-rak | | 2:16 |
| 21. | "King of the Charm" (킹받는 매력) | | Kang Min-gu | | 3:14 |
| 22. | "A Timid Fool" (소심한 찌질이) | | Lee Yoon-ji | | 2:16 |
| 23. | "Met on a Single Log Bridge" (웬수는 외나무다리에서 만난다) | | Shim Hee-jin | | 1:39 |
| 24. | "Just Friends?" (그냥 친구?) | | Yoon Hyun-gyeom | | 2:12 |
| 25. | "Whimsical Family" (우당탕탕 하늘이네) | | Park In-hye | | 1:50 |
| Total length: | | | | | 67:39 |

CD2
| No. | Title | Music | Length |
|---|---|---|---|
| 1. | "Be Fine Today, So I Can Take Care of Myself Tomorrow" (featuring Kwon Ha-neul; 오늘의 내가 괜찮아야 내일의 나를 도울 수 있다) | Jung Se-rin | 4:06 |
| 2. | "Doctors Nam and Yeo" (남선생과 여선생) | Noh Yoo-rim | 2:11 |
| 3. | "Unexpected Chance" (뜻밖의 찬스) | Kim Jung-wan | 2:53 |
| 4. | "Let's Take a Break and Look at the Sky" (우리 쓰러진 김에 하늘 보고 쉬자) | Jung Se-rin | 3:07 |
| 5. | "Small Decision" (작은 결심) | Lee Ru-ri | 2:32 |
| 6. | "Since When Were You So Pretty?" (언제부터 그렇게 예뻤어요?) | Shim Hee-jin | 2:17 |
| 7. | "On a Clear Day" (하늘은 맑음) | Yoon Hyun-gyeom | 2:11 |
| 8. | "At the End of the Harsh Season" (가혹한 계절의 끝에서) | Kim Jung-wan | 3:56 |
| 9. | "A Reason Why I Can't Say Anything" (말 못 할 이유) | Lee Yoon-ji | 2:19 |
| 10. | "Family Is the Best" (가족이 최고야) | Lee Won-gil | 2:27 |
| 11. | "Childish Confrontation" (유치한 대결) | Shim Hee-jin | 1:27 |
| 12. | "A Drunken Episode" (만취 에피소드) | Son Sung-rak | 2:31 |
| 13. | "Play Hard to Get" (요상한 밀당) | Shim Hee-jin | 2:05 |
| 14. | "A Trivial Day" (소소한 하루) | Lee Yoon-ji | 3:58 |
| 15. | "Burnout Syndrome" (정서적 탈진의 시기) | Jung Se-rin | 2:16 |
| 16. | "Truth to Reveal" (밝혀야 할 진실) | Lee Ru-ri | 2:53 |
| 17. | "Self-Healing" (스스로 치유하기) | No Yoo-rim | 3:10 |
| 18. | "Blanket Kick" (이불킥 각) | Kim Jung-wan | 3:08 |
| 19. | "Cute Rival" (귀여운 라이벌) | Hong Eun-ji | 2:22 |
| 20. | "A Cute Clumsy Man" (미워할 수 없는 허당) | Kang Min-gu | 2:14 |
| 21. | "A Planned Trap" (계획된 함정) | Lee Won-gil | 3:15 |
| 22. | "The Difficulty" (들이닥친 난관) | Kim Jung-wan | 3:28 |
| 23. | "There Are No Eternal Secrets" (영원한 비밀은 없다) | Shim Hee-jin | 2:28 |
| 24. | "The Pride of Yeo Jeongwoo" (여정우의 자존심) | Lee Il-seop | 2:24 |
| 25. | "Love's Genesis" (너와 나의 시작) | No Yoo-rim | 3:08 |
| Total length: | | | 68:46 |

=== Singles ===
Singles included on the album were released from January 27, to March 10, 2024.

Original soundtrack (Part 1–6)

Part 1

All tracks are written by Lee Ki-hwan and Eunlim (Kiple).

Released on January 27, 2024
| No. | Title | Artist | Length |
|---|---|---|---|
| 1. | "In My Memory" (기억속에 너와) | Seulgi | 3:25 |
| 2. | "In My Memory" (기억속에 너와; Inst.) | | 3:25 |
| Total length: | | | 6:50 |

Part 2

All lyrics are written by Taibian; all music is composed by Taibian, Kim Jung-woo (Toxic), and An Gam-dok.

Released on February 3, 2024
| No. | Title | Artist | Length |
|---|---|---|---|
| 1. | "Not Alone" (혼자가 아니야) | Hynn | 4:12 |
| 2. | "Not Alone" (혼자가 아니야; Inst.) | | 4:12 |
| Total length: | | | 8:24 |

Part 3

All lyrics are written by Lee Chi-hoon; all music is composed by Park Sung-il.

Released on February 10, 2024
| No. | Title | Artist | Length |
|---|---|---|---|
| 1. | "The Way to Love Myself" (나 사랑법) | Chen | 3:29 |
| 2. | "The Way to Love Myself" (나 사랑법; Inst.) | | 3:29 |
| Total length: | | | 6:58 |

Part 4

All tracks are written by Inwoo.

Released on February 24, 2024
| No. | Title | Artist | Length |
|---|---|---|---|
| 1. | "Actually I Love You" (사실 너를) | Junggigo | 3:45 |
| 2. | "Actually I Love You" (사실 너를; Inst.) | | 3:45 |
| Total length: | | | 7:30 |

Part 5

All lyrics are written by Purple Park; all music is composed by Park and Inwoo.

Released on March 2, 2024
| No. | Title | Artist | Length |
|---|---|---|---|
| 1. | "Love Is" (사랑한다는 말은) | Dayoung (WJSN), Eden | 3:11 |
| 2. | "Love Is" (사랑한다는 말은; Inst.) | | 3:11 |
| Total length: | | | 6:22 |

Part 6

All tracks are written by Shim Gyu-tae, Kim Jae-won, and Jay Lee.

Released on March 10, 2024
| No. | Title | Artist | Length |
|---|---|---|---|
| 1. | "Lean on Me" (내게 기대) | Park Hyung-sik | 3:26 |
| 2. | "Lean on Me" (내게 기대; Inst.) | | 3:26 |
| Total length: | | | 6:52 |

== Marketing and release ==
Promotional poster of the series featuring the two lead actors.

In December 2023, JTBC initiated the promotional campaign for Doctor Slump by releasing its first teaser poster on December 19, which depicted the high school rivalry between the leads portrayed by Park Shin-hye and Park Hyung-sik. This was followed by the release of the first teaser video on December 22, showcasing the characters' transition from academic competitors to individuals dealing with slumps in adulthood. The network subsequently unveiled the drama's main poster on December 26, emphasizing the reunion of the central characters.

Promotions continued into January 2024, with JTBC releasing group and character posters on January 5 featuring the main cast, which included Park Shin-hye, Park Hyung-sik, Yoon Park, and Kong Seong-ha. A highlight video previewing the series' narrative arc and character backstories was published on January 12, followed by a final preview trailer on January 19. Doctor Slump premiered on JTBC on January 27, 2024, occupying the Saturday and Sunday timeslot at 22:30 (KST). It is also available for streaming on TVING in South Korea and Netflix internationally.

== Reception ==
=== Critical response ===
Professional ratings
Aggregate scores
| Source | Rating |
|---|---|
| Rotten Tomatoes | 100% |
Review scores
| Source | Rating |
| But Why Tho? | 6.5/10 |
| Common Sense Media | 3/5 stars |
| NME | 3/5 stars |
| South China Morning Post | 3/5 stars |

South Korean media critics focused heavily on the show's relatability and its depiction of "mental wounds". Ilgan Sports noted that the series effectively used the irony of doctors—who are typically viewed as "healers"—struggling to care for their own mental health to create a deep sense of empathy with the audience. The review highlighted that the transition from academic competition to mutual comfort felt realistic to viewers who have experienced South Korea's high-pressure work culture. In a comprehensive review by Maeil Business Newspaper, the series was described as a "sunshine-like drama" amidst a flood of provocative content, though it was criticized for relying on a "predictable romance" as the primary cure for professional burnout.

Internationally, the series received generally positive reviews, with particular praise directed at the chemistry between the lead actors. On the review aggregator website Rotten Tomatoes, 100% of 6 critics' reviews are positive, with an average rating of 7.2/10. Writing for Decider, Johnny Loftus gave a "Stream It" recommendation and noted that the lifelong rivalry between Park Shin-hye and Park Hyung-sik provided a compelling foundation for the evolving romance. S. Poorvaja of The Hindu echoed this sentiment, stating that the lead performances and the show's sensitivity largely compensated for its inconsistent pacing. While Nandini Iyengar of Bollywood Hungama lauded the "funny yet strong leads", and Pierce Conrad of the South China Morning Post offered a more tempered assessment, praising Park Shin-hye's "balanced and grounded" performance but felt that Park Hyung-sik's more "showy" portrayal occasionally bordered on caricature.

Critics were divided regarding the show's narrative focus and its handling of mental health. Tanu I. Raj of NME and Joly Herman of Common Sense Media both awarded the series three out of five stars, describing it as a "fast-paced" and "catchy" watch driven by witty banter. However, Raj observed that the writing occasionally diluted the story's impactful and realistic treatment of mental health. This sentiment was shared by Conrad, who argued that the series failed to fulfil its promise of addressing the stigmas surrounding mental health in South Korean society, focusing instead on the central romance. Sarah Musnicky of But Why Tho? gave the series a 6.5/10 rating, criticizing the plot as "directionless" and suggesting that the show's primary messaging became "muddied" as it struggled to find its footing.

=== Viewership ===
Doctor Slump was a commercial success, performing strongly across domestic cable television and international streaming platforms. The series premiered with a 4.1% nationwide rating on Nielsen Korea. Although viewership saw a temporary dip to a series low of 3.7% during the Korean New Year holiday, it rebounded to peak at a nationwide rating of 8.2% (9.8% in the Seoul metropolitan area) for its tenth episode. The series maintained an average nationwide audience share of 5.9% for the remaining episodes, (Note: Calculated based on the ratings of episodes 11 to 16 (5.704+6.598+5.272+6.325+4.951+6.463=35.313; 35.313÷6=5.886).) consistently ranking atop in its time slot.

Globally, the series achieved notable traction on Netflix. It debuted at number nine on the platform's non-English TV shows chart two days after its release. During the week of January 29 to February 4, 2024, it rose to the top position of the ranking chart, garnering 10.2 million viewing hours and 2.9 million total views. The drama remained on the global chart for nine consecutive weeks and reached the top ten in 35 countries. According to Netflix's biannual engagement reports released in September 2024 and February 2025, Doctor Slump accumulated 314.1 million hours viewed from 17.1 million total views in 2024.

Doctor Slump : South Korea viewers per episode (millions)

| Season | Episode number | | | | | | | | | | | | | | | | Average |
| Season | 1 | 2 | 3 | 4 | 5 | 6 | 7 | 8 | 9 | 10 | 11 | 12 | 13 | 14 | 15 | 16 | Average |
|---|---|---|---|---|---|---|---|---|---|---|---|---|---|---|---|---|---|
| 1 | 0.938 | 1.261 | 1.229 | 1.265 | 0.955 | 0.988 | 1.316 | 1.549 | 1.383 | 1.984 | 1.402 | 1.631 | 1.332 | 1.517 | 1.196 | 1.535 | 1.343 |

Source: Audience measurement performed nationwide by Nielsen Korea.

Average TV viewership ratings
| Ep. | Original broadcast date | Average audience share (Nielsen Korea) | |
| Ep. | Original broadcast date | Nationwide | Seoul |
|---|---|---|---|
| 1 | January 27, 2024 | 4.060% (3rd) | 4.769% (1st) |
| 2 | January 28, 2024 | 5.137% (1st) | 5.867% (1st) |
| 3 | February 3, 2024 | 5.075% (1st) | 5.679% (1st) |
| 4 | February 4, 2024 | 6.738% (1st) | 7.468% (1st) |
| 5 | February 10, 2024 | 3.735% (1st) | 4.042% (1st) |
| 6 | February 11, 2024 | 3.869% (1st) | 3.964% (1st) |
| 7 | February 17, 2024 | 5.699% (1st) | 6.916% (1st) |
| 8 | February 18, 2024 | 6.231% (1st) | 6.823% (1st) |
| 9 | February 24, 2024 | 5.824% (1st) | 6.808% (1st) |
| 10 | February 25, 2024 | 8.173% (1st) | 9.773% (1st) |
| 11 | March 2, 2024 | 5.704% (1st) | 6.444% (1st) |
| 12 | March 3, 2024 | 6.598% (1st) | 7.658% (1st) |
| 13 | March 9, 2024 | 5.272% (1st) | 6.228% (1st) |
| 14 | March 10, 2024 | 6.325% (1st) | 7.190% (1st) |
| 15 | March 16, 2024 | 4.951% (1st) | 5.937% (1st) |
| 16 | March 17, 2024 | 6.463% (1st) | 7.431% (1st) |
| Average | | 5.616% | 6.437% |
In the table above, the blue numbers represent the lowest ratings and the red numbers represent the highest ratings.; This drama aired on a cable channel/pay TV which normally has a relatively smaller audience compared to free-to-air TV/public broadcasters (KBS, SBS, MBC, and EBS).
