= I'm Not a Robot =

2017 South Korean television series

- Promotional poster
- Also known as: I Am Not a Robot; She's Not a Robot?!
- Hangul: 로봇이 아니야
- RR: Robosi aniya
- MR: Robosi aniya
- Genre: Romantic comedy; Sci-fi
- Created by: Han Hee for MBC
- Written by: Kim Sun-mi; Lee Seok-joon
- Directed by: Jung Dae-yoon
- Starring: Yoo Seung-ho; Chae Soo-bin; Um Ki-joon
- Music by: Kim Joon-seok
- Country of origin: South Korea
- Original language: Korean
- No. of episodes: 16

Production
- Executive producer: Kim Jin-chun
- Producer: Yoo Hyun-jong
- Camera setup: Single-camera
- Running time: 70 minutes
- Production company: May Queen Pictures

Original release
- Network: MBC TV
- Release: December 6, 2017 – January 25, 2018

Related
- My3

I'm Not a Robot (Korean: 로봇이 아니야; RR: Robosi aniya) is a South Korean television series starring Yoo Seung-ho, Chae Soo-bin, and Um Ki-joon. It is written by Kim Sun-mi and directed by Jung Dae-yoon. Producing the series for MBC is May Queen Pictures. It aired on MBC TV from December 6, 2017 to January 25, 2018, every Wednesday and Thursday at 21:55 (KST).

== Synopsis ==
Kim Min-kyu (Yoo Seung-ho) lives a luxurious but isolated life due to a severe allergy to physical contact with other human beings. He develops extreme life-threatening rashes that rapidly spread over his body whenever he has any form of skin contact. Jo Ji-ah (Chae Soo-bin) is trying to create businesses based on her inventions, notably two-networked heart-shaped lamps.

Min-kyu is the chairman and largest shareholder of KM Financial. He inherited his shares from his parents, who died in a car accident 15 years earlier. He was brought up by his father's friend and colleague, Hwang Do-won (Son Byong-ho), whose son, Hwang Yeo-chul (Kang Ki-young), is the same age as Min-kyu and the CEO of KM Financial.

KM Financial owns the Santa Maria team. The team is headed by professor Hong Baek-gyun (Um Ki-joon). Professor Hong's team has secretly created an advanced humanoid robot called AG3 (pronounced Aji 3), whose appearance he modeled on his ex-girlfriend Ji-ah (the sound of the robot's name is Ji-a [AJI 3] backwards).

Hwang Yeo-chul and his father Hwang Do-won try to sell the Santa Maria team to Bold Group, owned by a foreign investor, Martin, who has learned about the Aji 3 and wants to use it as a weapon. To convince Kim Min-kyu not to sell the Santa Maria team, Baek-gyun sends the robot to him as a demonstration. Just before the Aji 3 is delivered, the robot short-circuits and Baek-gyun asks Ji-ah to pose as the robot, giving the team time to repair Aji 3. Desperate for the 10 million won payment he is offering her, Ji-ah agrees, and impersonates the robot under the supervision of the Santa Maria team.

Gradually, Min-kyu falls in love with Ji-ah, believing that she is Aji 3. He is disturbed by this, since she is a robot to him, and "reboots" her, erasing the robot's memory. Baek-gyun then replaces Ji-ah with the real Aji 3. Ji-Ah, who has also fallen in love with Min-kyu, leaves the city in an attempt to forget him.

Min-kyu discovers Ji-ah's deception and that she had been pretending to be the robot, and has a violent allergic reaction that nearly kills him. Baek-gyun saves him and Min-kyu angrily breaks off his relationships and friendships with all of them for their betrayal. Ji-ah confesses everything to Min-kyu and says she loves him, and they rediscover their love, this time as humans.

Before the reboot, Aji 3 had stored all the video footage and data from the trials with Kim Min-kyu in a secret cache. This cache gets hacked, revealing everything about Min-kyu's illness. The knowledge is used to attempt a take-over of KM Financial, to remove Min-kyu as chairman and complete the sale of the Santa Maria team and Aji 3. Min-kyu manages to thwart the attempt at the last moment. He uncovers evidence that Hwang Do-won and Martin were involved in the murder of Chairman Park, and restores the Aji 3 to the Santa Maria team. Two years later, the Santa Maria team successfully launches a new robot after changing its appearance, while they along with Ji-ah and Min-kyu (after completing the mandatory military service) are happily living their changed lives.

== Cast ==
=== Main ===
- Yoo Seung-ho as Kim Min-kyu (28 years old)

The largest shareholder of the country's largest financial company with an IQ of 159 but is a "human allergy" patient who cannot touch or be touched by others. Through his company, he owns Aji 3, an android robot which gets sent to him to be tested. When the robot is damaged in an accident, Ji-ah is used to replace Aji 3. He develops feelings for Ji-ah as the robot and falls in love with her.

- Chae Soo-bin as Jo Ji-ah (28 years old) / Aji 3

- Jo Ji-Ah: A passionate young entrepreneur with a high emotional intelligence and an imaginative inventor who was inspired by her father while spending time with him in his car repair shop. She is recruited by the Santa Maria robot team to pretend to be Aji 3. She has an IQ of 94.
- Aji 3: The world's most advanced humanoid robot among the artificial intelligence models released.

- Um Ki-joon as Hong Baek-kyun (34 years old)

Ji-Ah's ex-boyfriend who is a world-renowned genius robotics professor who creates the android named Aji 3 and bases her appearance on Ji-ah. She is also a powered robot created Santa Maria team.

=== Supporting ===
==== Santa Maria team ====
- Park Bo-Yung as "Eric Jhon Amper" (20 years old)
- Park Se-wan as "Pi" Angela Jin (30 years old)
- Song Jae-ryong as "Hoktal" Kang Dong-won (33 years old)
- Go Geon-han as "Ssanip" Eddie Park (29 years old)

==== KM Financial ====
- Kang Ki-young as Hwang Yoo-chul (28 years old)

Min-kyu's childhood best friend who betrayed him after Min-kyu's parents' death and, having become the CEO of the company, is now his rival both in business and for the hand of Ri-el.

- Hwang Seung-eon as Ye Ri-el (28 years old)

Min-kyu's childhood friend and first love. Yoo-chul is in love with her but at first she wants to marry Min-kyu.

- Son Byong-ho as Hwang Do-won

Yoo-chul's father and the president of the company.

- Lee Byung-joon as Ye Sung-tae

Ri-el's father and one of the founders of the company.

- Lee Hae-young as Mr. Yoon

KM Group Managing Director.

==== People around Min-kyu ====
- Um Hyo-sup as Doctor Oh

Min-kyu's doctor. Having cared for him for fifteen years, he is initially the only other person aware of his condition.

- Lee Ga-ryeong as Young Min-gyoo's mom
- Kim Ha-kyun as Butler Sung

==== People around Ji-ah ====
- Seo Dong-won as Jo Jin-bae

Ji-ah's older brother who is the research team leader of KM Financial.

- Lee Min-ji as Sun-hye (28 years old)

Ji-ah's friend who is a cafe owner and is a fortune-teller and an expert on romance.

- Yoon So-mi as Hong-ju (28 years old)

Ji-ah's schoolmate friend and Jin-bae's wife.

- Lee Han-seo as Jo Dong-hyun (8 years old)

Jin-bae and Hong-ju's child.

=== Extended ===
- Kim Ki-doo as Miami, a hired thief.
- Choi Dong-gu as Alps

== Production ==
- Dong Ha and Bang Min-ah were first offered the lead roles, but ultimately declined.
- The first script reading of the cast was held on September 27, 2017 at MBC Station in Sangam-dong.

== Soundtrack ==
=== Part 1 ===
No.	Title	Lyrics	Music	Artist	Length
1.	"Something"	Seo Dong-sung	Park Sung-il, Uncle Sam	Sung-hoon (Brown Eyed Soul)	03:15
2.	"Something" (Inst.)		Park Sung-il, Uncle Sam		03:15
Total length:					06:30

=== Part 2 ===
No.	Title	Lyrics	Music	Artist	Length
1.	"Know Me" (날 알아줄까)	Lohi	Lohi	Stella Jang	03:35
2.	"Know Me" (Inst.)		Lohi		03:35
Total length:					07:10

=== Part 3 ===
No.	Title	Lyrics	Music	Artist	Length
1.	"Words Of Your Heart" (마음의 말)	Lee Chi-hoon	Choi Jae-man	Kim Yeon-ji	05:05
2.	"Words Of Your Heart" (Inst.)		Choi Jae-man		05:05
Total length:					10:10

=== Part 4 ===
No.	Title	Lyrics	Music	Artist	Length
1.	"Loving A Thing With All One's Heart" (마음 다해 사랑하는 일)	Kim Dam-so	Kim Dam-so	Damsonegongbang	03:46
2.	"Loving A Thing With All One's Heart" (Inst.)		Kim Dam-so		03:46
Total length:					07:32

=== Part 5 ===
No.	Title	Lyrics	Music	Artist	Length
1.	"Here I Stand" (여기 서 있어)	Juniel	Juniel	Juniel	04:05
2.	"Here I Stand" (Inst.)		Juniel		04:05
Total length:					08:10

=== Part 6 ===
No.	Title	Lyrics	Music	Artist	Length
1.	"Slow Down" (천천히 할래)	Vincent Blue	Vincent Blue	Vincent Blue	04:05
2.	"Slow Down" (Inst.)		Vincent Blue		04:05
Total length:					08:10

== Ratings ==
The series was a commercial failure only averaging 3.22% in audience share, and received the lowest viewership ratings in its time-slot throughout its run.

Ep.	Part	Original broadcast date	Average audience share			
Ep.	Part	Original broadcast date	TNmS		Nielsen Korea	
Ep.	Part	Original broadcast date	Nationwide	Seoul	Nationwide	Seoul
1	1	December 6, 2017	4.0% (NR)	4.4% (NR)	4.1% (NR)	4.5% (NR)
1	2	December 6, 2017	4.3% (NR)	5.1% (NR)	4.5% (NR)	5.3% (NR)
2	1	December 7, 2017	3.3% (NR)	3.9% (NR)	3.0% (NR)	3.6% (NR)
2	2	December 7, 2017	3.4% (NR)	4.0% (NR)	3.1% (NR)	3.7% (NR)
3	1	December 13, 2017	3.0% (NR)	3.4% (NR)	2.8% (NR)	3.2% (NR)
3	2	December 13, 2017	3.4% (NR)	3.7% (NR)	3.1% (NR)	3.4% (NR)
4	1	December 14, 2017	4.3% (NR)	5.1% (NR)	2.9% (NR)	3.7% (NR)
4	2	December 14, 2017	4.8% (NR)	5.5% (NR)	3.4% (NR)	4.0% (NR)
5	1	December 20, 2017	3.4% (NR)	4.1% (NR)	2.6% (NR)	3.3% (NR)
5	2	December 20, 2017	3.9% (NR)	4.5% (NR)	3.3% (NR)	3.8% (NR)
6	1	December 21, 2017	2.7% (NR)	3.1% (NR)	2.6% (NR)	3.0% (NR)
6	2	December 21, 2017	3.3% (NR)	4.2% (NR)	3.2% (NR)	4.1% (NR)
7	1	December 27, 2017	3.1% (NR)	3.2% (NR)	2.4% (NR)	2.5% (NR)
7	2	December 27, 2017	3.7% (NR)	3.9% (NR)	2.7% (NR)	2.8% (NR)
8	1	December 28, 2017	3.1% (NR)	3.7% (NR)	2.8% (NR)	3.4% (NR)
8	2	December 28, 2017	3.3% (NR)	3.8% (NR)	3.1% (NR)	3.6% (NR)
9	1	January 3, 2018	3.3% (NR)	3.4% (NR)	3.3% (NR)	3.5% (NR)
9	2	January 3, 2018	3.9% (NR)	4.2% (NR)	3.6% (NR)	3.9% (NR)
10	1	January 4, 2018	3.3% (NR)	3.9% (NR)	2.5% (NR)	3.3% (NR)
10	2	January 4, 2018	3.8% (NR)	4.0% (NR)	3.5% (NR)	3.7% (NR)
11	1	January 10, 2018	3.9% (NR)	4.5% (NR)	3.0% (NR)	3.6% (NR)
11	2	January 10, 2018	4.5% (NR)	4.8% (NR)	4.0% (NR)	4.3% (NR)
12	1	January 11, 2018	3.3% (NR)	3.8% (NR)	2.9% (NR)	3.4% (NR)
12	2	January 11, 2018	3.8% (NR)	4.0% (NR)	3.9% (NR)	4.1% (NR)
13	1	January 17, 2018	3.9% (NR)	4.4% (NR)	3.0% (NR)	3.5% (NR)
13	2	January 17, 2018	4.4% (NR)	4.8% (NR)	3.6% (NR)	4.0% (NR)
14	1	January 18, 2018	3.2% (NR)	4.1% (NR)	2.5% (NR)	3.4% (NR)
14	2	January 18, 2018	3.6% (NR)	4.3% (NR)	3.2% (NR)	3.9% (NR)
15	1	January 24, 2018	3.2% (NR)	3.5% (NR)	3.9% (NR)	4.2% (NR)
15	2	January 24, 2018	3.7% (NR)	3.9% (NR)	4.3% (NR)	4.5% (NR)
16	1	January 25, 2018	3.3% (NR)	3.6% (NR)	3.1% (NR)	3.4% (NR)
16	2	January 25, 2018	3.9% (NR)	4.1% (NR)	3.4% (NR)	3.6% (NR)
Average			3.6%	3.9%	3.2%	3.7%
In the table above, the blue numbers represent the lowest ratings and the red numbers represent the highest ratings.; NR denotes that the episode did not rank in the top 20 daily programs on that date.

== Adaptation ==
In 2023, Disney+ Hotstar announced that it would create an Indian Tamil-language adaptation of the series. The remake titled MY3 is directed by M. Rajesh and stars Hansika Motwani, Shanthanu Bhagyaraj, and Mugen Rao.
