= Love Untangled =

2025 film by Namkoong Sun

- Release poster
- Hangul: 고백의 역사
- Lit.: History of Confession
- RR: Gobaegui yeoksa
- MR: Kobaegŭi yŏksa
- Directed by: Namkoong Sun
- Written by: Ji Chun-hee; Wang Doo-ri
- Produced by: Lee Kang-jin
- Starring: Gong Myung; Shin Eun-soo; Cha Woo-min; Yoon Sang-hyeon; Kang Mi-na
- Cinematography: Kim Il-hyun
- Edited by: Lee Kang-hee
- Music by: Kim Tae-seong
- Production company: Bombaram Film
- Distributed by: Netflix
- Release date: August 29, 2025
- Running time: 119 minutes
- Country: South Korea
- Language: Korean

Love Untangled (Korean: 고백의 역사) is a 2025 South Korean romantic comedy film directed by Namkoong Sun and written by Ji Chun-hee and Wang Doo-ri. Produced under Bombaram Film, it stars Gong Myung, Shin Eun-soo, Cha Woo-min, Yoon Sang-hyeon, and Kang Mi-na. The film premiered on Netflix on August 29, 2025.

== Plot ==
Park Se-ri is a cheerful highschool student who is insecure about her natural curly hair. She has a crush on Kim Hyun, a fellow popular student in her school. A new salon "Jangmi salon" opens up in her town and offers "Seoul Magic Hair Straightening" which she can't afford. Se-ri befriends a new transfer student Han Yoon-seok after she saves his life from drowning. When she learns that the salon is owned by Han Yoon-seok's mother, she helps him out to score points with his mother. However she is genuinely a good friend to him and helps him come out of his shell. Se-ri learns from a neighbor that Yoon-seok's father is a professor in a medical university in Seoul and his pressure and disappointment in Yoon-seok lead him to give up on writing the CSAT.

Yoon-seok and Se-ri's friends help her plan her confession to Kim Hyun during a school trip but Se-ri backs out at the last moment, admitting to him that she liked him a lot but now she realizes she loves someone else. Se-ri and Yoon-seok briefly start dating but Yoon-seok rushes to Seoul to be with his mother after being assaulted by his father.

Se-ri follows to Seoul but overhears Yoon-seok telling his mother that his aunt wants him and the mother to come to the US to escape the domestic violence from his father, but he wants to go back to their life in Busan. Wanting a peaceful life for them away from the father, Se-ri leaves a voicemail to Yoon-seok that she liked him as a friend and doesn't want to continue their relationship.

Months later, Se-ri graduates and is pursuing Marine sports in college. Her friends arrange a blind date for her, which she doesn't attend. She gets a call from the date who reveals himself as Yoon-seok. She apologizes for saying mean things to him on the voicemail but he understands having heard her other voicemail she intended to delete. They get back together and the group rejoice their union.

== Cast ==
- Gong Myung as Han Yoon-seok
- Shin Eun-soo as Park Se-ri
- Cha Woo-min as Kim Hyeon
- Yoon Sang-hyeon as Baek Seong-rae
- Kang Mi-na as Go In-jeong
- Choi Gyu-ri as Ma Sol-ji
- Lee So-i as Bang Ha-young
- Son Hee-rim as Jung Da-ul
- Ryu Seung-soo as Hong Il
- Kim Ji-young as Bok-hee
- Hong Eun-hee as Jang-mi
- Jo Bok-rae as a homeroom teacher
- Chun Myung-woo as Sang-cheol
- Lee Da-eun as Hye-ri
- Kim Chan-hyung as Seok-jin
- Park Ji-young as Seon-mi
- Kim Hee-jin as Yu-jeong
- Jung Yi-rang as a canteen lady

Gong Yoo, Jung Yu-mi and Park Jeong-min made special appearances.

== Production ==
=== Development ===
The film was officially commissioned by Netflix, with Namkoong Sun serving as director and the script is penned by Ji Chun-hee and Wang Doo-ri, while Bombaram Film managed the production.

=== Casting ===
In June 2024, it was reported that Gong Myung would appear in the film. In September 2024, Choi Gyu-ri joined the cast.

In September 2024, the cast was confirmed with Gong Myung, Shin Eun-soo, Cha Woo-min, Yoon Sang-hyeon and Kang Mi-na set to star.

=== Filming ===
Principal photography of the film commenced in September 2024. The filming took place in Busan.

== Release ==
The trailer of the film was released on July 31, 2025. The film was made available to stream exclusively on Netflix on August 29, 2025.

== Reception ==
=== Viewership ===
Following its global release on August 29, 2025, Love Untangled debuted at number 3 on Netflix's global Non-English Films chart. In the following week, it climbed to number 1 on the chart. Overall, the film remained in Netflix's Top 10 Non-English Films for six weeks, reaching the Top 10 in 31 countries.

=== Critical response ===
JK Sooja of Common Sense Media awarded the film 3/5 stars. John Serba of Decider particularly related the film's energy to Easy A, and added, "Shin [Eun-soo] gives enough endearing quirks and physical flourishes (don’t overlook her subtly physical performance; body language is key to some of the comedy here) to Se-ri, rendering her a protagonist worth caring about."

=== Accolades ===
Award	Date of ceremony	Category	Recipient(s)	Result	Ref.
Baeksang Arts Awards	May 8, 2026	Best New Actress	Shin Eun-soo	Nominated	
Golden Cinematography Awards	June 8, 2026	Best New Actress	Shin Eun-soo	Won	
