= Filing for Love =

2026 South Korean television series

- Promotional poster
- Hangul: 은밀한 감사
- Hanja: 隱密한 監査
- Lit.: Secret Audit
- RR: Eunmilhan gamsa
- MR: Ŭnmirhan kamsa
- Genre: Workplace comedy; Melodrama
- Created by: Yang Hee-seung
- Written by: Yeo Eun-ho
- Directed by: Lee So-hyun
- Starring: Shin Hye-sun; Gong Myung; Kim Jae-wook; Hong Hwa-yeon
- Music by: Kim Joon-seok; Jeong Se-rin
- Country of origin: South Korea
- Original language: Korean
- No. of episodes: 12

Production
- Running time: 60 minutes
- Production companies: Studio Dragon; The Modori

Original release
- Network: tvN
- Release: April 25 – May 31, 2026

Filing for Love (Korean: 은밀한 감사) is a 2026 South Korean workplace comedy television series created by Yang Hee-seung, written by Yeo Eun-ho, directed by Lee So-hyun, and starring Shin Hye-sun, Gong Myung, Kim Jae-wook, and Hong Hwa-yeon. The series tells the story of Joo In-ah, head of the audit department with a secret, and Noh Ki-jun, the department's former ace who's suddenly demoted to handle the company's messiest scandals. It aired on tvN from April 25, to May 31, 2026, every Saturday and Sunday at 21:10 (KST).

== Synopsis ==
Noh Ki-jun stands out as the key figure on the internal audit team, especially after uncovering a corruption case within management. However, his anticipated rise turns into a fall when the enigmatic and formidable Joo In-ah, the new head of audits, becomes his boss. As a member of the misconduct team, Noh Ki-jun is tasked with resolving minor conflicts rather than investigating major scandals. Nevertheless, he receives an anonymous tip alleging that Joo In-ah is engaged in a workplace affair. He sees it as a chance to get back at his boss and take back his position. But as he digs deeper into the investigation, he realizes Joo In-ah isn't who he thought she was. A fragile alliance forms between them, and their rivalry slowly turns into an unexpected attraction.

== Cast and characters ==
=== Main ===
- Shin Hye-sun as Joo In-ah
  - Kim Si-eun as teen In-ah
  - Shin Chae-rin as young In-ah

Head of the Audit Department at the Haemu Group. She holds the title of "youngest female executive," yet she is also the Group's "problem." Although she comes across as a ruthless career woman, she isn’t completely cold or indifferent. She actually enjoys pulling pranks and lightening the mood. However, once offended, she becomes icy and chilling. Her unpredictable and emotionless nature makes her even more intimidating, almost like a madwoman.

- Gong Myung as Noh Ki-jun

Assistant manager of Haemu Group Audit Team 1. He applied to Haemu Group, the top choice among job seekers, and got the offer immediately. He was later recruited by the Headquarters Audit Office, the company's most powerful department. Favored by top execs, he was on a fast track for a big promotion until Joo In-ah showed up. She demoted him from Audit Team 1, a top elite team he'd commanded, to Audit Team 3, a group of losers, assigning him the most menial task: PM (Public Morals).

- Kim Jae-wook as Jeon Jae-yeol

Executive Vice Chairman of Haemu Group. He is the third-generation chaebol heir, a high-achieving student and a devoted son who never rebelled. Behind his perfect image, a deep wound lies. His biological mother was kicked out after contracting a serious illness. As Chairman Jeon steps back from the group due to health issues, he clashes with his half-brother Seong-yeol over succession.

- Hong Hwa-yeon as Park Ah-jung

Jae-yeol's secretary. She realized that her beautiful appearance can make her life more difficult, so she has kept her guard up. She used to be in a relationship with Ki-jun for 2 years.

=== Supporting ===
==== Audit Office People ====
- Oh Dae-hwan as Moo Gwang-il

Audit Team 3 Manager. With no standout skills, he rotated through various departments and subsidiaries. Through repeated demotions, he's gained a thorough understanding of the company's workings. He has long given up on becoming an executive, and just wants to coast and retire without incident.

- Jang In-sub as Cha Seong-tae

Audit Team 3 Manager. He is a master of office politics, expertly delegating tasks and avoiding actual work. He comes up with any excuses to use the company credit card for personal purchases and does his personal business in the company restroom. He wastes most of his work hours checking stock trading screens or browsing second-hand trading apps.

- Park Joo-hee as Pyeon Hae-young

Audit Team 3 Accountant. As an accounting clerk, she oversees expense processing, budget management, and departmental events like team dinners. With her backing, she wields significant control, essentially running the department's finances. She dictates budget rules beyond company guidelines, strictly rejecting expenses that could've been approved with some flexibility.

- Shim Su-bin as Yoon Da-hye

Audit Team 3 Assistant Manager. With an Economics degree from Seoul National and a CPA license, she was a standout hire who chose Haemu Group over top firms, but later she seems less driven to prove herself. She is burnt out from exams and competition, and just wants to coast.

- Lee Kwang-hee as Baek Hyun-kyu

Audit Team 3 Chief. He got into the company through an executive who liked his spirit, despite his lack of top credentials or a big-name school. Despite being a slow processor, he landed a spot in the Headquarters Audit Office thanks to his standout loyalty; he catered to superiors and gave his all to the company, going above and beyond on protocol.

- Uhm Jun-gi as Ahn Min-soo

Audit Team 1 Manager. He is Ki-jun's colleague and friend, who is envious of his success.

- Bae Jae-seong as Seong Du-gi

Audit Team 1 Chief. The youngest in Audit Team 1, he's got a cheerful vibe and a humble attitude, making him a favorite among seniors.

==== Haemu Group People ====
- Kang Sang-jun as Jeon Seong-yeol

The executive director of Haemu Group, who is Jae-yeol's half-brother.

- Jeon Gook-hwan as Jeon Mu-tae

The chairman of Haemu Group, who is Jae-yeol's father.

- Ji Yi-soo as Oh Hyun-young

Jae-yeol's wife, who is the eldest daughter of Sesan Group.

- Son Ji-yoon as Bu Se-young

The HR director of Haemu Group.

==== Ki-jun's family ====
- Lee Ji-ha as Ki-jun's mother

==== In-ah's family ====
- Park Ji-il as Joo In-ah's father
  - Park Yong-woo as young Joo In-ah's father
- Yang So-min as Joo Kyeong-hee
  - Keum Min-kyung as young Kyeong-hee

In-ah's late mother.

=== Special appearances ===
- Lee Jung-eun as Uhm Hwa-sook

A cafeteria cook.

- Park Ha-sun as Young-hee

Son Myung-soo's wife.

- Pyo Ye-jin as Yeon So-young

Hyun-woo's wife.

- Shin Hyun-soo as Kwon Hyun-woo

So-young's husband.

== Episodes ==
No.	Title	Original release date
1	"Up, Down, Up-Up, Down"; Transliteration: "Wi alaewiwialae" (Korean: 위 아래위위아래)	April 25, 2026
Right before his special promotion, Noh Ki-jun, the audit department's ace, is demoted to Audit Team 3, which handles workplace scandals, on the orders of new audit head Joo In-ah. Noh Ki-jun's first case comes from Young-hee, the wife of a food team employee, who suspects her husband of an affair and asks him to investigate. After interviewing the employees, Ki-jun concludes Young-hee has delusional jealousy. However, Joo In-ah casts doubt on his report claiming no suspicion of infidelity.
2	"I Am the Best"; Transliteration: "Naega jeiljalnaga" (Korean: 내가제일잘나가)	April 26, 2026
After earning the nickname "Haemu Fainting Man" from a humiliating incident, Noh Ki-jun took on his second case: the "Company Employee.com Zone F Complaint" case on an anonymous online community. Alerted to a rumored scandal in Zone F of Haemu Group's underground parking lot, Audit Team 3 investigated using HUMINT to confirm the claims. Noh Ki-jun also encountered an unexpected complication in his daily life. His ex-girlfriend, Park Ah-jung, who had nowhere to stay due to sudden circumstances, sought out him, and they unexpectedly began living together. Ki-jun's attempt to leave the Audit Department also failed.
3	"A Woman With A Twist"; Transliteration: "Banjeon issneun yeoja" (Korean: 반전있는여자)	May 2, 2026
Noh Ki-jun struggled to obtain decisive evidence against Joo In-ah. After designating an anonymous email submission as "Project Noname" and waiting for an opportunity, he found that Joo In-ah's daily routine differed from his expectations. Her solitary and irregular eating habits, along with her failure to use benefits such as annual leave, raised his suspicions. Rumors of an inappropriate relationship between Team Leader Moo Gwang-il and cafeteria cook Uhm Hwa-sook spread quickly on a website.
4	"Playing with Fire"; Transliteration: "Buljangnan" (Korean: 불장난)	May 3, 2026
5	"Heart Burn"; Transliteration: "Yeol iollayo" (Korean: 열이올라요)	May 9, 2026
6	"Can't You"; Transliteration: "Andoenayo" (Korean: 안되나요)	May 10, 2026

== Production ==
=== Development ===
Created by writer Yang Hee-seung, the workplace comedy Filing for Love is directed by Lee So-hyun, who helmed Delightfully Deceitful (2023) and My Dearest Nemesis (2025), and the screenplay is written by Yeo Eun-ho, who worked with creator Yang on Crash Course in Romance (2023). The production is handled by Studio Dragon and The Modori, known for co-producing Love Next Door (2024).

=== Casting ===
In June 2025, Shin Hye-sun was reportedly considering starring as Joo In-ah with Gong Myung, who is a leading candidate for Noh Ki-jun. The next month, Kim Jae-wook and Hong Hwa-yeon were reportedly cast. Shin, Gong, Kim and Hong's appearances were confirmed by August 2025.

=== Filming ===
Principal photography began in September 2025. On December 30, 2025, Gong Myung was hospitalized due to sudden deafness, resulting in the postponement of filming. He was scheduled to resume on January 2, 2026.

== Release ==
Filing for Love was reportedly scheduled to premiere on tvN in the first half of 2026. By March 2026, tvN officially confirmed the broadcast of the series to be on April 25, 2026, and airing every Saturday and Sunday at 21:10 (KST).

== Viewership ==
Filing for Love : South Korea viewers per episode (millions)

Season	Episode number												Average
Season	1	2	3	4	5	6	7	8	9	10	11	12	Average
1	1.139	1.501	1.254	1.800	1.444	2.185	1.362	1.775	1.349	1.954	1.733	2.214	1.643

Source: Audience measurement performed nationwide by Nielsen Korea.

Average TV viewership ratings
Ep.	Original broadcast date	Average audience share (Nielsen Korea)	
Ep.	Original broadcast date	Nationwide	Seoul
1	April 25, 2026	4.362% (1st)	4.776% (1st)
2	April 26, 2026	6.319% (1st)	6.741% (1st)
3	May 2, 2026	4.770% (1st)	4.990% (1st)
4	May 3, 2026	7.890% (1st)	8.088% (1st)
5	May 9, 2026	5.865% (1st)	6.442% (1st)
6	May 10, 2026	9.360% (1st)	10.309% (1st)
7	May 16, 2026	5.793% (1st)	6.012% (1st)
8	May 17, 2026	7.922% (1st)	7.879% (1st)
9	May 23, 2026	5.867% (1st)	6.379% (1st)
10	May 24, 2026	8.134% (1st)	8.469% (1st)
11	May 30, 2026	7.620% (1st)	8.535% (1st)
12	May 31, 2026	9.667% (1st)	10.309% (1st)
Average		6.964%	7.411%
In the table above, the blue numbers represent the lowest ratings and the red numbers represent the highest ratings.; This series aired on a cable channel/pay TV which normally has a relatively smaller audience compared to free-to-air TV/public broadcasters (KBS, SBS, MBC, and EBS).
