= Juror 8 =

South Korean legal film

- Theatrical release poster
- Hangul: 배심원들
- RR: Baesimwondeul
- MR: Paesimwŏndŭl
- Directed by: Hong Seung-wan
- Written by: Hong Seung-wan
- Produced by: Kim Mu-ryeong
- Starring: Moon So-ri; Park Hyung-sik; Baek Soo-jang; Cha Mi-kyung; Yoon Kyung-ho; Seo Jeong-yeon; Jo Han-chul; Kim Hong-pa; Cho Soo-hyang
- Edited by: Kim Chang-ju
- Production company: Banzakbanzak Film Production
- Distributed by: CGV Arthouse
- Release date: May 15, 2019
- Running time: 114 minutes
- Country: South Korea
- Language: Korean
- Box office: US$2 million

Juror 8 is a 2019 South Korean legal drama film written and directed by Hong Seung-wan. Loosely based on the 1957 American film 12 Angry Men, the film depicts South Korea’s first citizen participation trial, in which eight ordinary jurors are drawn into an unexpected debate over guilt and justice when a seemingly settled murder case takes an unforeseen turn. The ensemble cast includes Moon So-ri, Park Hyung-sik, Baek Soo-jang, Cha Mi-kyung, Yoon Kyung-ho, Seo Jeong-yeon, Jo Han-chul, Kim Hong-pa, and Cho Soo-hyang. It was released in South Korea on May 15, 2019.

== Synopsis ==
In 2008, South Korea holds its first ever citizen participation trial. Eight ordinary individuals from diverse backgrounds are selected to serve as jurors in a case that has drawn widespread public attention. The case appears straightforward: a murder supported by clear evidence, witness testimony, and a confession, with sentencing seemingly the only issue remaining. However, when the defendant unexpectedly retracts the confession and denies the charges, the jury is required to deliberate on guilt or innocence instead.

The presiding judge, Joon-gyeom, known for her strict adherence to principle, attempts to conduct the trial efficiently and according to procedure despite the unprecedented involvement of lay citizens. As the proceedings continue, persistent questioning and challenges from the jurors, particularly Juror No. 8 Nam-woo, begin to influence the course of the trial, leading it in unanticipated directions. The trial becomes a test of the justice system's first experiment with public participation, as ordinary citizens confront an extraordinary responsibility.

== Cast ==
- Moon So-ri as Presiding Judge Kim Joon-gyeom
- Park Hyung-sik as Kwon Nam-woo
- Baek Soo-jang as Yoon Geu-rim
- Cha Mi-kyung as Yang Choon-ok
- Yoon Kyung-ho as Jo Jin-sik
- Seo Jeong-yeon as Byeon Sang-mi
- Jo Han-chul as Choi Yeong-jae
- Kim Hong-pa as Jang Gi-baek
- Cho Soo-hyang as Oh Soo-jeong
- Kwon Hae-hyo as President of the Court
- Tae In-ho as Presiding judge
- Lee Hae-woon as Associate judge
- Seo Hyun-woo as Kang Doo-sik
- Lee Yong-yi as Kang Doo-sik's mother
- Yum Dong-hun as Kang Doo-sik's uncle
- Shim Dal-gi as Kang So-ra
- Kim Hak-sun as Forensic doctor
- Go Seo-hee as Community center employee

== Production ==
The first script reading took place on June 29, 2018. Principal photography began on July 7, 2018 and filming wrapped up on September 22, 2018.

== Reception ==
As of 26 May 2019, the film reached a total of 270,270 admissions grossing $1,831,951 in revenue.

== Awards and nominations ==
Year	Award	Category	Recipient	Result	Ref
2019	39th Korean Association of Film Critics Awards	Best New Actor	Park Hyung-sik	Won	
2019	40th Blue Dragon Film Awards	Best New Actor	Park Hyung-sik	Nominated	
2019	40th Blue Dragon Film Awards	Popular Star Award	Park Hyung-sik	Won	
2019	Istanbul International Crime And Punishment Film Festival 2019	Habertürk Audience Award	Juror 8	Won	
