= I Am a Running Mate =

2025 South Korean television series

- Promotional poster
- Hangul: 러닝메이트
- Lit.: Running Mate
- RR: Reoningmeiteu
- MR: Rŏningmeit'ŭ
- Genre: Teen; Coming-of-age
- Written by: Han Jin-won; Hong Ji-soo; Oh Do-geon
- Directed by: Han Jin-won
- Starring: Yoon Hyun-soo; Lee Jung-shik; Choi Woo-sung; Hong Hwa-yeon; Lee Bong-jun; Kim Ji-woo
- Music by: Koo Bon-choon
- Country of origin: South Korea
- Original language: Korean
- No. of episodes: 8

Production
- Producer: Song Joon
- Cinematography: Choi Min-hwan
- Editor: Han Mi-yeon
- Camera setup: Single-camera
- Running time: 40 minutes
- Production companies: Blade Entertainment; Ace Maker Studio; Running Mate Culture Industry Specialty Co., Ltd.; TVING

Original release
- Network: TVING
- Release: June 19, 2025

I Am a Running Mate (Korean: 러닝메이트) is a 2025 South Korean television series co-written and directed by Han Jin-won, and starring Yoon Hyun-soo, Lee Jung-shik, Choi Woo-sung, Hong Hwa-yeon, Lee Bong-jun, and Kim Ji-woo. The series follows a model student, who becomes a running mate for the school student council to improve his image. The series premiered on TVING on June 19, 2025. It's also available on Viu in selected regions.

I Am a Running Mate was invited as one of six drama series in the On Screen section of the 28th Busan International Film Festival on October 6, 2023, where three of nine episodes were screened.

== Cast and characters ==
=== Main ===
- Yoon Hyun-soo as No Se-hun: a model student at Yeongjin High School who dreams of becoming student council vice president and aims to turn around his image due to an unexpected incident.
- Lee Jung-shik as Kwak Sang-hyun: a flashy and cool visual as well as outstanding friendliness, befitting his nicknames of 'local district insider' and 'walking human boutique'.
- Choi Woo-sung as Yang Won-dae: head of the choir and student council president.
- Hong Hwa-yeon as Yoon Jeong-hee
- Lee Bong-jun as Park Ji-hoon
- Kim Ji-woo as Ha Yoo-kyung: everyone's first love at Yeongjin High School.

=== Supporting ===
- Lee Jae-yi as Hyun-jin: a participant in the school student council election.
- Park Geun-rok as Shin Jun-gyu: a teacher in charge of the student council president election management committee.
- Hwang Seong-bin as Joo Wan-sik: an election campaign cheerleader.
- Lee Seung-heon as Choi Jong-su: Se-hun's rival in the school student council election.
- Kim Ji-hoon as Ma Du-yeong
- Kwon Han-sol as Cho Han-byul
- Ok Jin-wook as Nam Kyung-tae
- Yoon Do-gun as Kang Jae-won

== Production ==
On March 20, 2023, TVing confirmed the production of TV series Running Mate, the directing debut of writer Han Jin-won. The cast of Yoon Hyun-soo, Lee Jung-shik, Choi Woo-sung, Hong Hwa-yeon, Lee Bong-jun, Kim Ji-woo, Ok Jin-wook, and Yoon Do-gun was confirmed to appear in the series. Acemaker Studio, a content production company of Acemaker Movieworks is producing the series in co-production with Blade Entertainment and Running Mate Culture Industry Specialty Limited, provided by TVING.

== Release ==
The series was scheduled to premiere on March 6, 2025, but postponed due to scheduling issues. All episodes were released on June 19, 2025.
