= Milmyeon =

Korean noodle dish

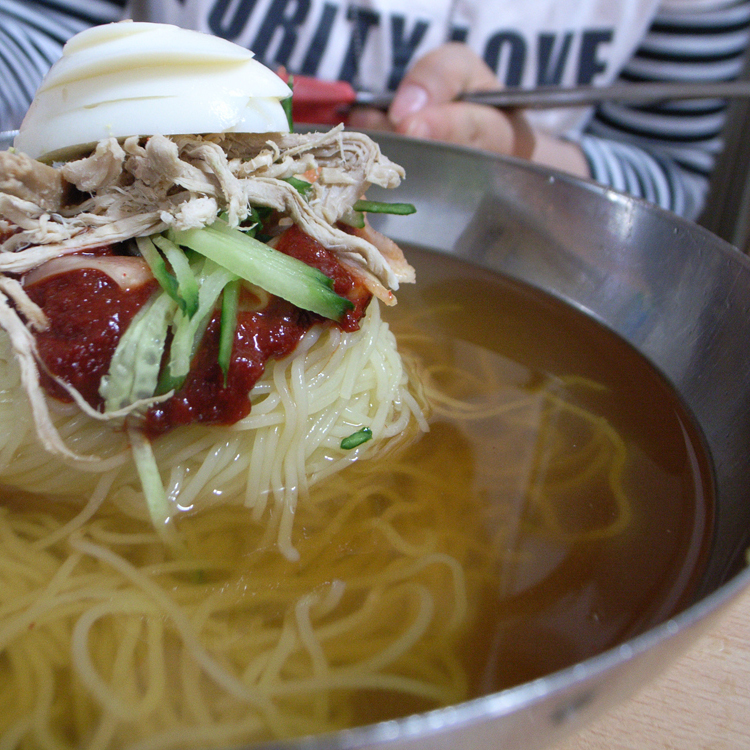
- Type: Korean noodles
- Place of origin: Korea
- Region or state: Busan
- Main ingredients: Noodles (wheat flour, sweet potato and potato starch), meat broth, vegetables
- Variations: mul milmyeon, bibim milmyeon

Milmyeon (Korean: 밀면; lit. 'wheat noodles') is a noodle dish that originated in Busan, South Korea. Milmyeon is a variant of the northern Korean noodle dish naengmyeon. It consists of wheat noodles in a cold meat broth (mul milmyeon) or a spicy sauce (bibim milmyeon), and topped with vegetables and garnish.

Naengmyeon is a northern Korean dish that is based on noodles containing buckwheat flour. During the Korean War, many northerners fled to the South. Buckwheat was scarce in Busan, so northern refugees made somyeon noodles with wheat flour provided by American food rations. One restaurant, Naeho Naengmyeon, claims to have been the originator of the dish, although this claim has been disputed. The new version of the dish was called milmyeon, meaning "wheat noodle". Milmyeon has become a specialty of Busan. Milmyeon is commonly consumed during the hot and humid summer months in Busan, when its chilled broth and refreshing acidity make it a popular relief from the heat.

The basic recipe includes noodles made from wheat flour and potato (or sweet potato) starch, and meat broth enriched with vegetables and medicinal herbs.

Milyeon comes in two basic varieties. In mul milmyeon (물밀면; lit. 'water milmyeon'), the noodles are served in an icy-cold broth and topped with pickled garnishes. Bibim milmyeon is made with a spicy, gochujang-based paste.
