= Lee Hae-young (actor) =

South Korean actor (born 1970)

Lee Hae-Young
- 이해영
- Born: September 7, 1970 (age 55); Seoul, South Korea
- Education: Seoul Institute of the Arts – Department of Theater
- Occupation: Actor
- Years active: 1995–present
- Agent: Filmitsuda
- Website: Agency Official Instagram

Lee Hae-Young (Korean: 이해영; born September 7, 1970), also transliterated as Lee Hae-Ryung, is a South Korean male actor.

== Filmography ==
=== Television ===
- 1998: SBS Good Luck as friend of Kwon Oh-Jung (EP4)
- 2006: SBS Barefooted Love as Lee Sang-Cheol
- 2007: KBS2 The Scammers as Kang Seung-Ho
- 2008–2010: tvN Unkind Lady as Jang Dong-Kyun
- 2009: KBS2 Fool as White Reporter
- 2011: SBS Midas as Cha Young-Min
- 2011: KBS2 KBS Drama Special – Behind the restructuring of West Capital City Sports Association as Hong Si-Jang
- 2012: TV Chosun Korean Peninsula as Han Young-Hoon
- 2013: KBS2 Ad Genius Lee Tae-baek as Hwang Executive
- 2014: KBS2 Big Man as Zharok Branch Manager
- 2014: tvN The Great Conman as Lawyer Ko Chan-Yong
- 2014: tvN Secret Affair as Jang Myung-Suk
- 2014: tvN Dr. Frost as Park Ki-Woong
- 2016: OCN The Vampire Detective as Jung Ki-Woong
- 2016: tvN The Piper as Ko Si-Jang
- 2017: OCN Voice as Jang Kyung-Hak
- 2017: SBS Saimdang, Memoir of Colors as Jung Min-Seok / Lee Hwang
- 2017: OCN Duel as Park Dong-Soo
- 2017: OCN Black as Min Jae-Hoon
- 2017: MBC I'm Not a Robot as Executive Yoon
- 2018: OCN Possessed as Cha Min-Jae
- 2018: JTBC Sketch as Park Woo-Jin
- 2018: OCN Voice 2 as Jang Kyung-Hak
- 2018: OCN The Guest as Officer Koo
- 2019: MBC Different Dreams as Hong
- 2019: JTBC At Eighteen as Yoo Jong-Soo
- 2019: tvN Psychopath Diary as Yoo Jae-Joon
- 2020: SBS The King: Eternal Monarch as Yoo Kyung-Moo / Yoo Jo-Ryul
- 2020: tvN Stranger 2 as Shin Jae-Yong
- 2020: TV Chosun Wind and Cloud as General Yang Heon-Su
- 2021: tvN L.U.C.A.: The Beginning as Oh Jong-Hwan
- 2021: KBS2 Moonshine as Go Won-Pyo
- 2021: tvN You Are My Spring as Go Jin-Pyo
- 2022: Disney+ Grid as Kwon Soo-Keun (EP7)
- 2022: Netflix The Glory as Shin Young-Joon
- 2023: tvN Business Proposal as Kang Kyung-Ho
- 2023: Netflix Bloodhounds as Hwang Yang-Jung
- 2023: tvN Thirty-Nine as Lee Sang-Hyuk
- 2023: Disney+ Vigilante as Eom Jae-Hyub

=== Film ===
- 1995: Outing
- 1996: The Gate of Destiny
- 2000: Peppermint Candy as Kyeong-Chul
- 2001: No Blood No Tears as Bong-Sik
- 2002: Jail Breakers
- 2003: The Coast Guard
- 2005: The President's Last Bang as Kim Jae-Kyu
- 2006: A Bittersweet Life as Ki-Ho
- 2008: Radio Dayz
- 2009: Mother as Detective
- 2010: The Man From Nowhere as Detective
- 2012: Pacemaker
- 2014: A Violent Prosecutor as Kim Sung-Gi
- 2016: Asura: The City of Madness as Prosecutor Choi
- 2017: Fabricated City as Prosecutor Kim
- 2019: The Drug King as Chief Prosecutor
- 2021: Night in Paradise as Jung
