= Undercover High School =

2025 South Korean television series

- Promotional poster
- Hangul: 언더커버 하이스쿨
- RR: Eondeokeobeo haiseukul
- MR: Ŏndŏk'ŏbŏ haisŭk'ul
- Genre: Action comedy; Spy
- Written by: Im Young-bin
- Directed by: Choi Jung-in
- Starring: Seo Kang-joon; Jin Ki-joo; Kim Shin-rok
- Music by: Park Se-joon
- Country of origin: South Korea
- Original language: Korean
- No. of episodes: 12

Production
- Executive producers: Lee Hyang-bong; Bae Ik-hyun; Ahn Chang-ho; Seo Young-rok; Jo Young-jae; Jung Yeon-ji
- Producer: Lee Wol-yeon
- Cinematography: Kim Sung-han; Jo Min-chul
- Editors: Kim Mi-kyung; Kim Min-ji
- Running time: 70 minutes
- Production companies: Neo Entertainment; Slingshot Studio

Original release
- Network: MBC TV
- Release: February 21 – March 29, 2025

Undercover High School (Korean: 언더커버 하이스쿨) is a 2025 South Korean action comedy spy television series written by Im Young-bin, directed by Choi Jung-in, and starring Seo Kang-joon, Jin Ki-joo, and Kim Shin-rok. The series depicts a man who is an NIS agent goes undercover as a high school student. It aired on MBC TV from February 21, to March 29, 2025, every Friday and Saturday at 21:50 (KST). It is also available for streaming on TVING and Wavve in South Korea, and on Viu, Kocowa and Viki in selected regions.

== Synopsis ==
Jeong Hae-seong, a demoted NIS agent following a major incident that occurred during an operation, is tasked with a special mission of tracking down the whereabouts of Emperor Gojong's missing gold bars. Hae-seong hides his identity, goes undercover as a high school student at Byeongmun High School, and meets Oh Su-a, his homeroom teacher. Su-a, a devoted teacher to her students, begins to notice the similarities between Hae-seong and her childhood first love, who left her heartbroken and filled with painful memories.

== Cast and characters ==
=== Main ===
- Seo Kang-joon as Jeong Hae-seong / Jeong Si-hyun
  - Yu Ji-wan as young Jeong Si-hyun

An ace field agent of Domestic Team 4 of the NIS who is given a special mission to find Emperor Gojong's gold bars.

- Jin Ki-joo as Oh Su-a / Oh Bong-ja
  - Park Seol-ha as young Oh Bong-ja

Hae-seong's homeroom teacher who is a temporary Korean history teacher at Byeongmun High School.

- Kim Shin-rok as Seo Myeong-ju

Chairwoman of the Byeongmun Foundation and Byeongmun High School who is Ye-na's mother.

=== Supporting ===
==== NIS people ====
- Jeon Bae-soo as An Seok-ho

Head of the Domestic Team 4 of the NIS and is like a second family and father to Hae-seong.

- Jo Bok-rae as Go Yeong-hun

Hae-seong's junior agent at the NIS.

- Yoon Ga-i as Park Mi-jeong

Hae-seong's junior agent at the NIS.

- Lee Seo-hwan as Kim Hyung-bae

Director of domestic division of the NIS.

- Im Cheol-hyeong as Gong Jin-sang

Seok-ho's classmate and the head of the NIS Domestic Team 1.

==== Student Council of Byeongmun High School ====
- Kim Min-ju as Lee Ye-na

Student council president of Byeongmun High School who is Myeong-ju's only daughter.

- Park Se-hyun as An Yu-jeong

Student council member of Byeongmun High School who is Seok-ho's daughter and Hae-seong's younger sister.

- Jang Seong-beom as Park Tae-soo

A student council member of Byeongmun High School who is a son of a three-term National Assembly member from Yeouido.

- Lee Hyun-so as Han Seung-jae

Student council member of Byeongmun High School who is a son of the CEO of Han Young Law Firm, one of the top law firms in South Korea.

- Yoon Chae-bin as Yoon Chae-rin

A student council member of Byeongmun High School and an idol trainee.

- Kim Sun-min as Ji Hyun-joon

Student council vice-president of Byeongmun High School.

==== Students of Byeongmun High School ====
- Shin Jun-hang as Lee Dong-min

A student of Byungmun High School who is bullied by Tae-soo's group.

- Jeong Soo-hyun as Im Yoon-cheol

One of the class bullies that uses his mouth rather than fists.

- Kang Pil-jun as Son Beom-sik

The class bully who has a keen eye for details.

- Shin Ga-eun as Choi Su-jin

A student who is faster and more sensitive to SNS and trends than anyone else.

- Kim Seung-beom as Kim Ho-jin

A student of Byeongmun High School who is the source of information and is serious about internet broadcasting and content commercial production.

==== Teacher's office of Byeongmun High School ====
- Park Jin-woo as Park Jae-mun

The principal of Byeongmun High School who is Myeong-ju's loyal henchman.

- Oh Yong as Baek Kwang-du,

The vice-principal of Byeongmun High School.

- Lee Min-ji as Kim Ri-an

Su-a's fellow teacher and soulmate who teaches physical education.

- Noh Jong-hyun as Lee Jun-ho

Su-a's fellow teacher who has a crush on her and teaches mathematics.

==== Others ====
- Kim Young-ah as Im Cheong-ha

Su-a's mother who runs Have a Drink With Su-a restaurant for over 10 years.

- Kim Soo-jin as Jang Man-ok

Seok-hi's wife, Yoo-jung's mother, and a mother-like person to Hae-seong.

- Gu Min-hyuk as Kim Hyeon-ho

Security guard at Byeongmun High School.

- Kim Eui-sung as Seo Byeong-mun

A traitor to his nation who was never recorded in history and the keeper of Emperor Gojong's secret safe.

- Oh Eui-shik as Jeong Jae-Hyeon

Hae-seong's father and a NIS agent who was missing for 22 years.

== Production ==
=== Development ===
The series began its production and is planned by Namkoong Seong-woo, written by Im Young-bin, directed by Choi Jung-in, and produced by Neo Entertainment and Slingshot Studios. In addition, it aimed to air in early 2025.

=== Casting ===
In March 2024, Seo Kang-joon was reportedly in talks as the lead actor and his agency told the media that he was positively reviewing it. This was Seo's first work after completing his military service in May last year as well as comeback to the small screen after 2022 TV series Grid. In May 2024, Jin Ki-joo and Kim Min-ju were reportedly cast to work along Seo with the former as the female lead in the series. In June 2024, MBC confirmed that Seo and Jin would appear as the lead actors for the series. This was also Seo's first MBC drama comeback after appearing in Splendid Politics (2015). The same month, Kim Shin-rok was reportedly confirmed to cast July 2024.

=== Filming ===
Principal photography began in the first half of 2024.

== Original soundtrack ==
=== Part 1 ===
All tracks are written by Polar Bears (Lee Jung-woo, Rich, Cozy).

Released on February 21, 2025
No.	Title	Artist	Length
1.	"Until I'm With You"	Doyouka	3:57
2.	"Until I'm With You" (Inst.)		3:57
Total length:			7:54

=== Part 2 ===
All lyrics are written by Kinsha; all music is composed by Tomajo and Noyi.

Released on February 28, 2025
No.	Title	Artist	Length
1.	"Love Is You"	Kim Pu-reum	3:00
2.	"Love Is You" (Inst.)		3:00
Total length:			3:00

=== Part 3 ===
All lyrics are written by Loogone and Han Gyeong-soo; all music is composed by Loogone, Han, and Prime Time.

Released on March 7, 2025
No.	Title	Artist	Length
1.	"Call My Name" (내 이름을 불러줘)	Han Gyeong-soo	3:25
2.	"Call My Name" (내 이름을 불러줘; Inst.)		3:25
Total length:			6:50

=== Part 4 ===
All lyrics are written by Zeenan and Lee Jung-won; all music is composed by Zeenan, Lee, +1, and Dong6.

Released on March 10, 2025
No.	Title	Artist	Length
1.	"A-Yo"	Lucy	2:50
2.	"A-Yo" (Inst.)		2:50
Total length:			5:40

=== Part 5 ===
All lyrics are written by Giryeon; all music is composed by Giryeon, +1, and Dong6.

Released on March 14, 2025
No.	Title	Artist	Length
1.	"How About You?" (넌 어때)	Vin	3:15
2.	"How About You?" (넌 어때; Inst.)		3:15
Total length:			6:30

=== Part 6 ===
All tracks are written by Polar Bears (Lee Jung-woo, Rich, Cozy).

Released on March 21, 2025
No.	Title	Artist	Length
1.	"I'm in Love With You"	Homezone	2:53
2.	"I'm in Love With You" (Inst.)		2:53
Total length:			5:46

== Release ==
MBC announced that Undercover High School would be broadcast in a Friday–Saturday timeslot in February 2025. The series was confirmed to premiere on MBC TV on February 21, at 21:50 (KST). It is also available for streaming on TVING and Wavve in South Korea, and on Viu, Kocowa and Viki in selected regions.

== Viewership ==
Undercover High School : South Korea viewers per episode (millions)

Season	Episode number												Average
Season	1	2	3	4	5	6	7	8	9	10	11	12	Average
1	1.099	1.311	1.199	1.537	1.387	1.386	1.312	1.239	1.153	1.044	1.156	1.142	1.247

Source: Audience measurement performed nationwide by Nielsen Korea.

Average TV viewership ratings
Ep.	Original broadcast date	Average audience share (Nielsen Korea)	
Ep.	Original broadcast date	Nationwide	Seoul
1	February 21, 2025	5.6% (12th)	5.8% (9th)
2	February 22, 2025	6.6% (5th)	6.5% (4th)
3	February 28, 2025	6.6% (9th)	6.7% (6th)
4	March 1, 2025	8.3% (3rd)	8.3% (3rd)
5	March 7, 2025	7.2% (6th)	7.0% (6th)
6	March 8, 2025	6.7% (3rd)	7.1% (3rd)
7	March 14, 2025	6.8% (6th)	6.3% (8th)
8	March 15, 2025	6.1% (4th)	6.1% (3rd)
9	March 21, 2025	6.1% (7th)	5.8% (8th)
10	March 22, 2025	5.4% (5th)	5.3% (5th)
11	March 28, 2025	6.0% (6th)	6.3% (7th)
12	March 29, 2025	5.8% (4th)	5.8% (4th)
Average		6.4%	6.4%
In the table above, the blue numbers represent the lowest ratings and the red numbers represent the highest ratings.

== Awards ==
- 2025 MBC Drama Awards
  - Drama of the Year: Undercover High School
  - Grand Prize (Daesang): Seo Kang-joon
  - Top Excellence Award, Actress in a Miniseries: Jin Ki-joo
  - Best Supporting Actress: Kim Shin-rok
