= Park Se-hyun =

South Korean actress (born 1998)

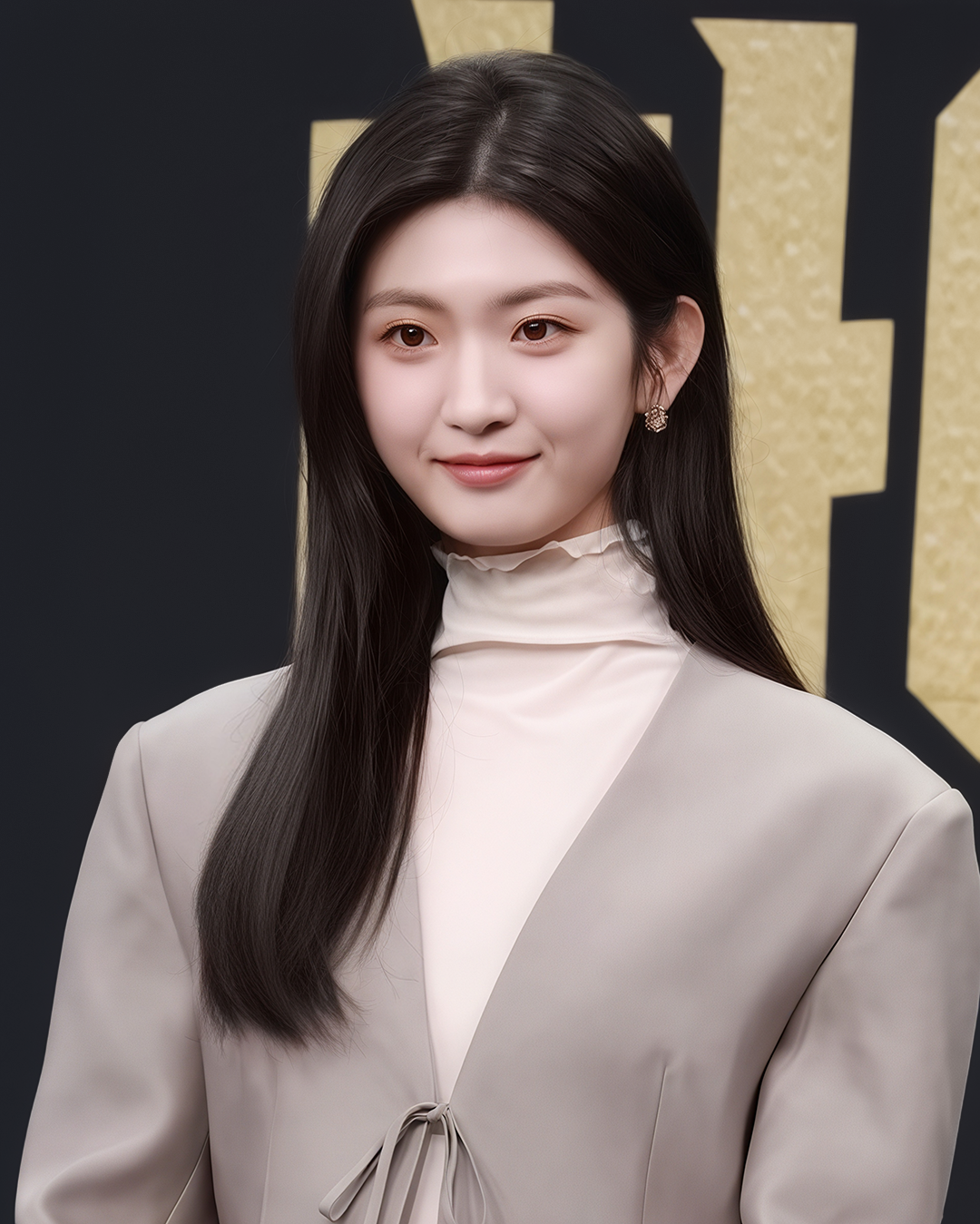
- Park in 2025
- Born: September 7, 1998 (age 28); South Korea
- Education: Sungshin Women's University – Department of Media, Film and Acting
- Occupation: Actress
- Years active: 2018–present
- Agent: Big Whale Entertainment

Korean name
- Hangul: 박세현
- RR: Bak Sehyeon
- MR: Pak Sehyŏn

Park Se-hyun (Korean: 박세현; born September 7, 1998) is a South Korean actress. She was most notable for her portrayal of Kim Eun in 2024 legal drama Your Honor.

== Career ==
Prior to her acting debut in 2018, Park Se-hyun graduated from the Department of Theater and Film at Kyewon Arts High School, and also furthered her studies in Sungshin Women's University's Department of Media, Film and Acting.

Park debuted in 2018 through a supporting role in Quiz of God: Reboot. She also appeared in many more dramas and movies through supporting roles, notably Youth of May, Big Mouth, The 8th Night, and Knight Flower.

In 2024, Park appeared in legal drama Your Honor, portraying Kim Eun, a warm-hearted and innocent girl with borderline intellectual disability, who was the only daughter of a ruthless ganglord named Kim Kang-heon (Kim Myung-min's character). Park received positive reviews from audiences for her portrayal of Kim Eun.

In 2025, Park appeared in Undercover High School, portraying An Yu-jeong, the surrogate younger sister of undercover NIS agent Jeong Hae-seong (Seo Kang-joon's character).

== Filmography ==
=== Television series ===
Year	Title	Role	Ref.
2018–19	Quiz of God: Reboot	Lee Ji-eun	
2019	Everything and Nothing	Jeon Yu-ri	
2019	Doctor Prisoner	Kim Hye-jin	
2020	The Temperature of Language: Our Nineteen	Seo Eun-bin	
2020	Record of Youth	Choi Soo-bin	
2021	Missing Child	Bo-ram	
2021	Youth of May	Lee Jin-ah	
2021	Adult Trainee	Kang Da-hyun	
2022	Big Mouth	Jang Hee-joo	
2023	Poong, the Joseon Psychiatrist	Wol	
2023	Race	Lee Hae-jo	
2024	Knight Flower	Lee Yeon-sun	
2024	Your Honor	Kim Eun	
2025	Undercover High School	An Yu-jeong	
2026	Still Shining	Im Ah-sol	

=== Films ===
Year	Title	Role	Ref.
2019	Kim Ji-young, Born 1982	Kim Ji-young (teen)	
2021	Whispering Corridors 6: The Humming	Song Jae-yeon	
2021	The Night Shift	High school girl	
2021	The 8th Night	High school girl	
2022	Anchor	Yoon Mi-so	
2022	Remember	Han Pil-ju's sister	
2023	Kill Boksoon	Gil Bok-soon (young)	
