= When the Weather Is Fine (TV series) =

2020 South Korean television series

- Promotional poster
- Also known as: I'll Find You on a Beautiful Day; I'll Go to You When the Weather is Nice
- Hangul: 날씨가 좋으면 찾아가겠어요
- Lit.: I'll Go to You When the Weather Is Fine
- RR: Nalssiga joeumyeon chajagagesseoyo
- MR: Nalssiga choŭmyŏn ch'ajagagessŏyo
- Genre: Drama; Romance
- Based on: I'll Go to You When the Weather Is Fine by Lee Do-woo
- Written by: Han Ga-ram
- Directed by: Han Ji-seung
- Starring: Park Min-young; Seo Kang-joon
- Country of origin: South Korea
- Original language: Korean
- No. of episodes: 16

Production
- Executive producer: Oh Hwan-min
- Producers: Min Hyun-il; Lee Sung-jin
- Running time: 60 minutes
- Production company: Ace Factory

Original release
- Network: JTBC
- Release: February 24 – April 21, 2020

When the Weather Is Fine (Korean: 날씨가 좋으면 찾아가겠어요) is a 2020 South Korean television series starring Park Min-young and Seo Kang-joon. Based on the 2018 novel of the same name by Lee Do-woo, it aired on JTBC from February 24 to April 21, 2020. It also streams on Viki.

== Synopsis ==
After a series of unfortunate events, cellist Mok Hae-won (Park Min-young) quits her job in Seoul and goes back to (fictional) Hyecheon, in Gangwon Province, where she briefly lived when she was in high school. There, she meets again her former classmate and neighbor, Im Eun-seob (Seo Kang-joon) who owns a bookstore now. In the cold winter, trying to escape the harsh and bitter reality of life, they both find warmth in each other that is enough to melt their long-frozen hearts. Together, they heal from their past wounds and eventually fall in love.

== Cast ==
=== Main ===
- Park Min-young as Mok Hae-won ("Irene"), an unemployed cello teacher.
  - Park Seo-kyung as young Hae-won.
- Seo Kang-joon as Im Eun-seob / Kim Jin-ho, a bookstore owner.
  - Ok Chan-yu as young Jin-ho.

=== Supporting ===
==== Hae-won's family ====
- Moon Jeong-hee as Shim Myeong-yeo, Hae-won's aunt, a writer and inn owner.
  - Kim Hong-bin as young Myeong-yeo.
- Lee Young-ran as Yoon Hye-ja, Hae-won's grandmother, she founded the inn.
- Jin Hee-kyung as Shim Myeong-joo, Hae-won's mother.
  - Jeon Yoo-rim as young Myeong-joo.
- Seo Tae-hwa as Mok Joo-hong, Hae-won's father.

==== Eun-seob's family ====
- Kim Hwan-hee as Im Hwi, Eun-seob's adoptive little sister.

Im Hwi is a boisterous girl who has a habit for taking her brother's wallet to finance her wants. Although her loquacious behavior often comes across as tactless, she can also hold a serious conversation that displays a level of maturity on certain occasions. She professes to be a master of coping with rejection after having been rejected many times by the boy she likes.

- Nam Gi-ae as Yoon Yeo-jeong, Eun-seob's adoptive mother.
- Kang Shin-il as Im Jong-pil, Eun-seob's adoptive father.
- Kang Jin-hwi as Kim Gil, Eun-seob's father.
- Kang Jin-hwi as Kim Gil-dong, Eun-seob's uncle.

==== Hyecheon High School alumni ====
- Lee Jae-wook as Lee Jang-woo, Eun-seob's friend in high school.
  - Oh Ja-hun as young Jang-woo.
- Kim Young-dae as Oh Young-woo, he used to be the top student and he was/is attracted to Hae-won.
- Yang Hye-ji as Ji Eun-shil, Jang-woo's first love.
- Im Se-mi as Kim Bo Young, Hae-won's former friend in high school.
- Park Han-sol as Joo-hee, Bo-yeong's classmate.

==== Goodnight Bookstore's book club members ====
- Lee Tae-hyung as Bae Geun-sang
- Lee Seon-hee as Choi Soo-jung, Myeong-yeo's friend.
- Chu Ye-jin as Kwon Hyun-ji, Hwi's friend.
- Han Chang-min as Jung Seung-ho
- Lee Young-seok as Jung Gil-bok

==== Others ====
- Ahn Dong-goo as young Cha Yoon-taek
- Lee Bong-ryun as Jang Ha-nim
- Kim Dae-geon as Kim Yeong-soo
- Yoon Sang-hwa as Park Hin-dol
- Hwang Gun as Cha Yoon-taek
- Noh Jae-hoon as Jung Hee

=== Special appearances ===
- Seo Tae-hwa as Mok Joo-hong
- Lee Seo-an as Jang-woo's blind date

== Production ==
The first script reading took place in October 2019 at JTBC Building in Sangam-dong, Seoul, South Korea.

On March 3, 2020, it was announced that the drama would take a break from filming for a week to take precautions against the spread of COVID-19. Episodes 5 and 6, which were originally scheduled to air on March 9 and 10 respectively, aired on March 16 and 17.

== Original soundtrack ==
When the Weather Is Fine OST

Soundtrack album by Various Artists
- Genre: Soundtrack
- Languages: Korean; English
- Label: Genie Music

=== Part 1 ===
Released on February 24, 2020
No.	Title	Lyrics	Music	Artist	Length
1.	"Like a Winter's Dream" (겨울이 꾸는 꿈처럼)	Jung Joong-han	Jung Joong-han	Kwak Jin-eon	4:10

=== Part 2 ===
Released on March 2, 2020
No.	Title	Lyrics	Music	Artist	Length
1.	"Doors of Time" (시간의 문)	Banana; March; Clef Crew	Park Jang-hyun; Clef Crew	Jungyup	5:01

=== Part 3 ===
Released on March 16, 2020
No.	Title	Lyrics	Music	Artist	Length
1.	"All Day Long" (하루종일)	KZ; Who's H; Feb; Jung Soo-min; Clef Crew; Banana; March	KZ; Who's H; Feb; Jung Soo-min; Clef Crew	Kyuhyun	4:48

=== Part 4 ===
Released on March 31, 2020
No.	Title	Lyrics	Music	Artist	Length
1.	"Dear My Love" (내가 정말 사랑하는 사람이 있죠)	Giryeon; Clef Crew; Banana; March	Giryeon; Oh Min; Clef Crew	Byul	4:46

=== Part 5 ===
Released on April 6, 2020
No.	Title	Lyrics	Music	Artist	Length
1.	"I See You" (너를 본다)	Jung Joong-han	Jung Joong-han	Giryeon	4:34

=== Part 6 ===
Released on April 14, 2020
No.	Title	Lyrics	Music	Artist	Length
1.	"Moody Night" (보고 싶은 밤)	KZ; Who's H; Jung Soo-min; Clef Crew; Banana; March	KZ; Who's H; Jung Soo-min; Yoo Sang-guen; Clef Crew	Jeon Sang-geun	3:48

=== Part 7 ===
Released on April 21, 2020
No.	Title	Lyrics	Music	Artist	Length
1.	"Remembrance" (추억이 머문 곳에서, 이젠)	Banana; March; Jeon Shi-woo; Somebody's Tale; Clef Crew	Somebody's Tale; Clef Crew	Yeoungeun	3:09

=== Chart performance ===
Title	Year	Peak positions	Remarks	Ref.
Title	Year	KOR	Remarks	Ref.
"All Day Long" (Kyuhyun)	2020	142	Part 3	

== Ratings ==
Average TV viewership ratings
Ep.	Original broadcast date	Title (Note: The episodes are named after some chapters' titles from the book on which the series is based.)	Average audience share (Nielsen Korea)
Ep.	Original broadcast date	Title	Nationwide
1	February 24, 2020	The Wind in the Willows (버드나무에 부는 바람)	1.925%
2	February 25, 2020	Is It Past Perfect? (과거완료입니까)	1.559%
3	March 2, 2020	The Wolf's Silver Eyebrow (늑대의 은빛 눈썹)	2.460%
4	March 3, 2020	My Old House in My Dream (꿈속의 옛집)	2.533%
5	March 16, 2020	Noblewoman From the West (서쪽에서 온 귀인)	2.316%
6	March 17, 2020	Search for the Legend (전설을 찾아서)	2.076%
7	March 23, 2020	The Road to the Cottage (오두막으로 가는 길)	2.255%
8	March 24, 2020	Where Suspicions Become Reality (의심을 이루어주는 곳)	2.598%
9	March 30, 2020	The Secret of the Boy Who Hated Dung Beetles (쇠똥구리를 싫어한 소년의 비밀)	2.151%
10	March 31, 2020	Let's Hold an Event (이벤트를 합시다)	2.148%
11	April 6, 2020	Two Different Stories (두 개의 이야기)	2.277%
12	April 7, 2020	A Confession (어떤 고백)	2.588%
13	April 13, 2020	Teardrop Tea Recipe (눈물차 레시피)	2.606%
14	April 14, 2020	The Maze of Sisterfield (시스터필드의 미로)	2.131%
15	April 20, 2020	Until We Meet Again (다시 만날 때까지)	2.376%
16	April 21, 2020	After a Long Winter (긴 겨울이 지나고)	2.667%
Average			2.291%
In the table above, the blue numbers represent the lowest ratings and the red numbers represent the highest ratings.; This drama aired on a cable channel/pay TV which normally has a relatively smaller audience compared to free-to-air TV/public broadcasters (KBS, SBS, MBC and EBS).

== International broadcast ==
- In Sri Lanka, the drama is available to stream via Iflix with subtitles. During its original run, new episodes of the drama were made available to stream 48 hours after the original Korean broadcast.
- In India, 'When the Weather Is Fine' first streamed on Disney+ Hotstar in July 2021 in Hindi. It was removed in 2024 after the rights expired. However, ZEE5 brought the show back in November 2025 with a brand-new Hindi dub.

== Translations of the Novel ==
Lee Do-Woo's Novel "I'll Go To You When the Weather is Fine" was also translated into French under the title "L'Odeur des Clementines Grillees" (The Smell of Grilled Clementines) on October 13, 2023. A pocket paperback version of the French translation will be available on February 7, 2025.
