= Hellbound (TV series) =

2021 South Korean television series

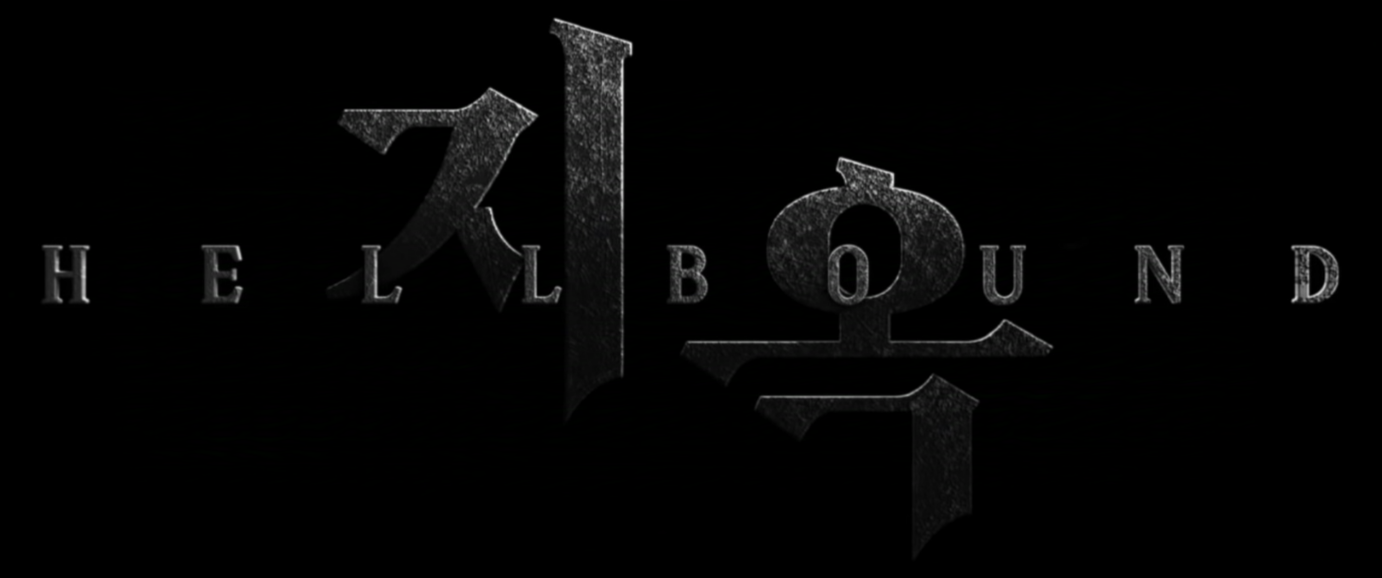
- Hangul: 지옥
- Hanja: 地獄
- Lit.: Hell
- RR: Jiok
- MR: Chiok
- Genre: Supernatural; Dark fantasy; Thriller; Horror
- Based on: Hellbound by: Yeon Sang-ho; Choi Gyu-seok
- Written by: Yeon Sang-ho; Choi Gyu-seok
- Directed by: Yeon Sang-ho
- Starring: Yoo Ah-in; Kim Hyun-joo; Park Jeong-min; Won Jin-ah; Yang Ik-june; Kim Do-yoon; Kim Shin-rok; Ryu Kyung-soo; Lee Re; Kim Sung-cheol; Im Seong-jae; Lee Dong-hee; Hong Eui-jun; Cho Dong-in
- Music by: Kim Dong-wook
- Country of origin: South Korea
- Original language: Korean
- No. of seasons: 2
- No. of episodes: 12

Production
- Executive producers: Byun Seung-min; Yang Yoo-min (season 2)
- Producer: Kim Yeon-ho
- Cinematography: Byun Bong-sun
- Editors: Han Mee-yeon (season 1); Yang Jin-mo
- Camera setup: Single camera
- Running time: 41–60 minutes
- Production companies: Climax Studio; Wow Point (season 2); Midnight Studio (season 2)

Original release
- Network: Netflix
- Release: November 19, 2021 – October 25, 2024

Hellbound (Korean: 지옥) is a South Korean supernatural dark fantasy thriller horror television series written and directed by Yeon Sang-ho with Choi Gyu-seok, based on their own webtoon of the same name. Set in the then future year of 2022, supernatural beings suddenly appear out of nowhere to condemn people to Hell. The series stars an ensemble cast including Yoo Ah-in, Kim Hyun-joo, Park Jeong-min, Won Jin-ah, Yang Ik-june, Kim Do-yoon, Kim Shin-rok, Ryu Kyung-soo, Lee Re, Kim Sung-cheol, Im Seong-jae, Lee Dong-hee, Hong Eui-jun, and Cho Dong-in

The first season of Hellbound premiered at the 2021 Toronto International Film Festival in the "Primetime program of TV series" on September 9, 2021, and became the first Korean drama to make it to the festival. It was released on Netflix on November 19, 2021, and became the world's most-watched Netflix series the next day, surpassing Squid Game, released two months prior in Singapore. Critics were positive of the show, but also cognizant that it followed in the footsteps of Squid Game; nonetheless, they predicted it to be heavily discussed and to have a lasting impact.

The second season was invited as one of the six drama series in the On Screen section at the 29th Busan International Film Festival. It was released on October 25, 2024.

== Premise ==
Hellbound takes place in 2022–27 in South Korea. An otherworldly face called an angel suddenly starts to materialize to deliver prophecies called decrees that condemn certain individuals to Hell at a specific future time, either seconds or years away. Three monstrous supernatural beings called demons appear at almost the exact time to maul and incinerate the person's body in a spectacular show of force called a demonstration. Two organizations in cahoots, the cult-like New Truth Society and the gang-like Arrowhead group, gain power by playing on people's fears.

Episodes 1–3 focus on a detective investigating the supernatural phenomena, the chairman of the New Truth religious order, and a principled attorney. Except for the attorney, the core characters change in episodes 4–6, which take place 5 years later and focus on a television producer and his wife who struggle with the fact that their newborn baby is bound for Hell.

== Cast ==
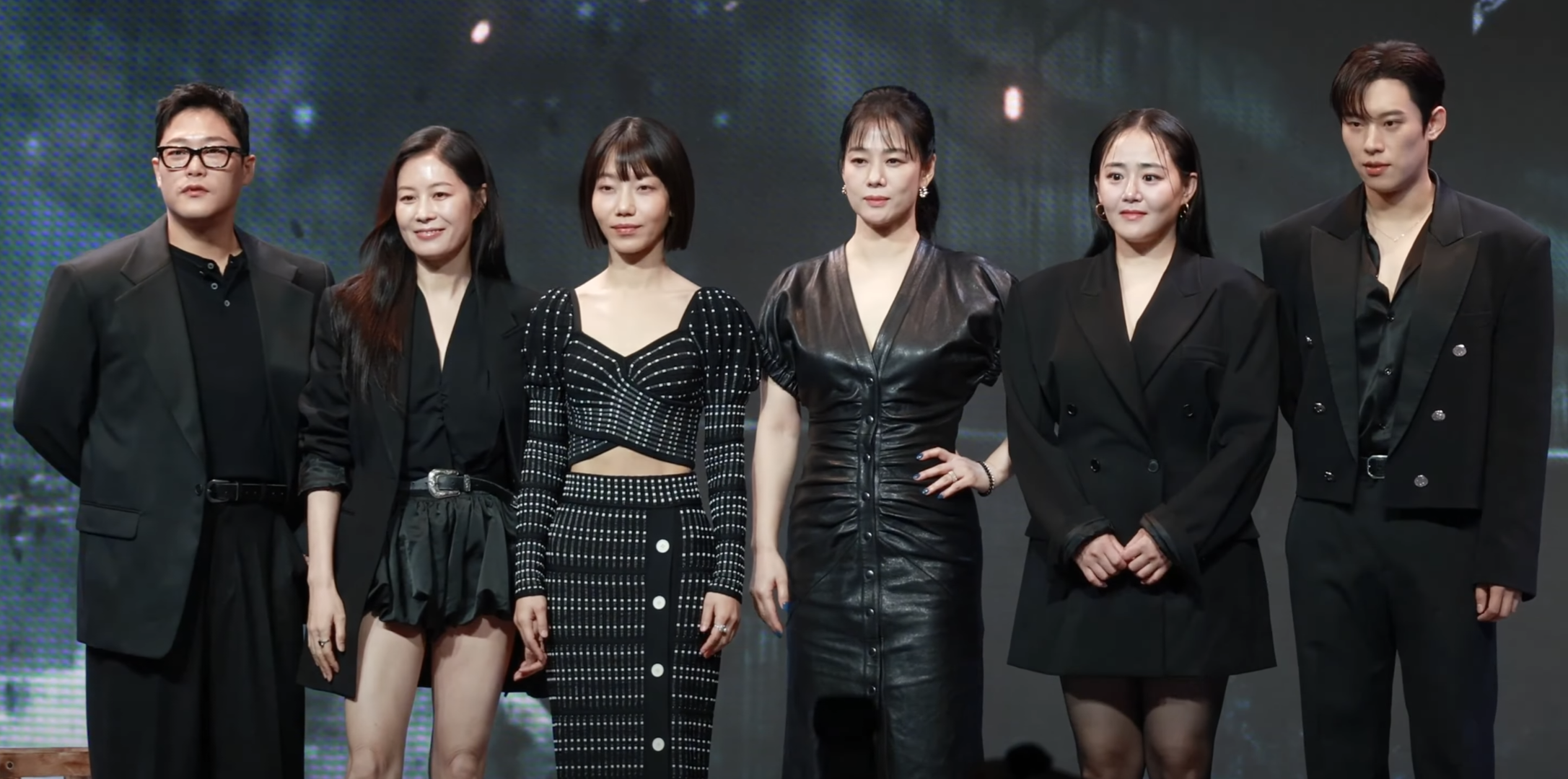
Cast of Hellbound S2 during the press conference in 2024

=== Main ===
- Yoo Ah-in (season 1) and Kim Sung-cheol (season 2) as Jeong Jin-soo, a cult leader of the emerging New Truth Society
  - Park Sang-hoon as young Jeong Jin-soo
- Kim Hyun-joo as Min Hye-jin, an attorney
- Yang Ik-june as Jin Kyeong-hoon, a detective
- Park Jeong-min as Bae Young-jae, a production director for a broadcasting station (Season 1)
- Won Jin-ah as Song So-hyun, the wife of Bae Young-jae (Season 1)

=== Supporting ===
- Kim Do-yoon as Lee Dong-wook / Skullface, a live streamer and member of Arrowhead, a gang of violent youths
- Kim Shin-rok as Park Jeong-ja, a single mother subject to the first public demonstration
- Lee Re as Jin Hee-jeong, the daughter of Jin Kyeong-hoon
- Ryu Kyung-soo as Yoo Ji, a priest of the New Truth cult
- Kim Mi-soo as Deacon Young-in of the New Truth
- Lee Dong-hee as Chairman Kim Jeong-chil
- Cha Si-won as Deacon Sacheong of the New Truth
- Im Hyeong-guk as Gong Hyeong-joon, a sociology professor and leader in the Sodo counter-organization
- Kim Hyun as Church member
- Im Seong-jae as Cheong Se-yeong, an Arrowhead's husband and a member of Sodo (Season 2)
- Hong Eui-joon as Kim Sung-jip, a leader of Sodo (Season 2)

=== Special appearances ===
Season 2

- Cho Dong-in
- Moon Geun-young as Ms. Sunshine / Oh Jiwon, a female member of Arrowhead
- Moon So-ri as Lee Su-gyeong
- Joo Hae-eun as Jung Jin-su's mother
- Jung Ji-so as Angel

== Episodes ==
| Season | Episodes | Originally released | Time slot |
|---|---|---|---|
| 1 | 6 | November 19, 2021 | Friday at 17:00 (KST) |
| 2 | 6 | October 25, 2024 | Friday at 15:00 (KST) |

=== Season 1 ===
| No. overall | No. in season | Directed by | Written by | Original release date |
|---|---|---|---|---|
| 1 | 1 | Yeon Sang-ho | Yeon Sang-ho & Choi Gyu-seok | November 19, 2021 |
| 2 | 2 | Yeon Sang-ho | Yeon Sang-ho & Choi Gyu-seok | November 19, 2021 |
| 3 | 3 | Yeon Sang-ho | Yeon Sang-ho & Choi Gyu-seok | November 19, 2021 |
| 4 | 4 | Yeon Sang-ho | Yeon Sang-ho & Choi Gyu-seok | November 19, 2021 |
| 5 | 5 | Yeon Sang-ho | Yeon Sang-ho & Choi Gyu-seok | November 19, 2021 |
| 6 | 6 | Yeon Sang-ho | Yeon Sang-ho & Choi Gyu-seok | November 19, 2021 |

=== Season 2 ===
| No. overall | No. in season | Directed by | Written by | Original release date |
|---|---|---|---|---|
| 7 | 1 | Yeon Sang-ho | Yeon Sang-ho & Choi Gyu-seok | October 25, 2024 |
| 8 | 2 | Yeon Sang-ho | Yeon Sang-ho & Choi Gyu-seok | October 25, 2024 |
| 9 | 3 | Yeon Sang-ho | Yeon Sang-ho & Choi Gyu-seok | October 25, 2024 |
| 10 | 4 | Yeon Sang-ho | Yeon Sang-ho & Choi Gyu-seok | October 25, 2024 |
| 11 | 5 | Yeon Sang-ho | Yeon Sang-ho & Choi Gyu-seok | October 25, 2024 |
| 12 | 6 | Yeon Sang-ho | Yeon Sang-ho & Choi Gyu-seok | October 25, 2024 |

== Production ==
The concept began with an 11-minute-long animated short titled Hell (지옥) written and drawn by Yeon Sang-ho in 2002 that was expanded (through the addition of a second part) into the 34-minute-long short titled Hell: Two Lives (지옥: 두개의 삶) in 2003. This was followed by a webtoon version of the concept retitled Hellbound published between 2009 and 2011. The series was released in two trade paperbacks in South Korea in 2021, with English releases through Dark Horse Comics following in 2022. A sequel series, Hellbound 2: The Resurrected (지옥2:부활자), was released in September 2023 and concluded in August 2024.

In April 2020, Netflix approved production of an original series based on the webtoon. Yeon signed on to direct the series.

=== Season 1 ===
Promotional poster incorporating several notable characters from the first season.

In late July, Yoo Ah-in, Park Jeong-min, Kim Hyun-joo, Won Jin-ah, Yang Ik-june, Kim Shin-rok, Ryu Kyung-soo, and Lee Re were confirmed to play various roles in the series.

The series was filmed at Cube Indoor Studio from August 2020 to January 2021. The old Chungnam Provincial Government Buildings in Sunhwa-dong, Jung District and the Hannam University Missionary Village in Daedeok District were the outdoor locations for filming. On February 25, 2021, the director and the cast of Hellbound introduced the TV series at a Netflix content roadshow.

=== Season 2 ===
Promotional poster incorporating Min Hyejin, Park Jungja and Chairman Jung Jinsu from the second season.

On September 24, 2022, Netflix confirmed a second season. On March 2, 2023, it was confirmed that Kim Sung-cheol would replace Yoo Ah-in following his drug use charges. Kim Hyun-joo, Kim Shin-rok, Yang Ik-june, Lee Dong-hee and Lee Re will reprise their respective roles in Season 2. Yang Dong-geun, Lim Seong-jae, Jo Dong-in and Moon Geun-young will also appear to enrich the narrative. On June 12, 2023, it was confirmed that Yang Dong-geun dropped out of the series for personal reasons, being replaced by Hong Eui-joon.

== Release ==
The series had its world premiere at the 2021 Toronto International Film Festival, when the first three episodes of the first season were screened in 'Primetime' section on September 9, 2021, and became the first Korean drama to make it to the festival. The first three episodes were also screened at the 26th Busan International Film Festival in newly created 'On Screen' section on October 7, 2021, and at the 65th BFI London Film Festival in the "Thrill" section on October 15, 2021. All six episodes of the first season were released on Netflix on November 19, 2021.

The second season of the series was invited as one of the six drama series in the On Screen section of the 29th Busan International Film Festival on October 2–11, 2024, where three out of six episodes had its world premiere. All six episodes of the second season were released on October 25, 2024.

== Reception ==
=== Critical response ===
On the review aggregator website Rotten Tomatoes, 97% of 32 critics' reviews are positive, with an average rating of 7.8/10. The website's consensus reads: "Summoned by the devilish imagination of writer-director Yeon Sang-ho, Hellbound leverages its terrifying concept to thoughtfully explore human fallibility." Metacritic, which uses a weighted average, assigned the season a score of 66 out of 100, based on 5 critics, indicating "generally favorable" reviews.

Nick Allen of RogerEbert.com gave the series a positive review, praising how the show mixed grounded horror with thoughtful discussions about sin. He wrote: "The wrath monster trio might be absurd, but the madness within Hellbound is extremely believable." Kylie Northover writing for The Age gave 4 stars out of 5 and appreciating the narrative wrote, "...the narrative steadily evolves into a compelling mix of police procedural, violent horror and shrewd commentary around ideas of human flaws, mortality, sin, justice and the influence of media." Referring to The Leftovers, she felt that Hellbound shows sensibilities as "humanity's search for purpose in the face of the divine, but its exploration of the conflicting ways in which humanity might react to such a mass event feels like something to which we can all, in a small way, relate post-pandemic.

Ed Power of The Telegraph rated the series with 3 stars out of 5 and stated, "Hellbound unspools like a mix of Clive Barker, The Da Vinci Code and the iconic Japanese horror, Ring." Kim Seong-hyeon reviewing for YTN wrote the "performances of the actors that make the hell of reality that the director solidly created in this way more smoothly". Concluding, Kim stated, "Although the somewhat insufficient CG leaves a little disappointment, Hell is a work that leaves a deep impression enough to offset that. There seems to be no doubt that Hell will be the most talked about work this winter." Abhishek Srivastava of The Times of India graded the series with 4 stars out of 5 and appreciated the narrative and performance stating, "It works multiple surprises in its narratives and features excellent performances that accentuate the drama on contrasts amongst its characters". About plot, Srivastava said, "In a neat, riveting plot twist, the show jumps ahead a few years; bringing in a new layer of characters, scenarios and situations,... Concluding his review he said, "Hellbound is not a horror thriller, or a crime drama. [Rather] it combines elements from different genres to create a highly bingeable show where human behaviour comes under scrutiny." Jeffrey Zhang of Strange Harbors graded the series with B+ and stated, "Hellbound finds a tricky moral tightrope underneath its phantasmagoria - a meticulously crafted and surprisingly introspective chiller even when it stumbles in its thematic juggling act".

==== Squid Game comparison ====
Stuart Heritage of The Guardian commenting on the comparison of the series with Squid Game wrote, "Hellbound is a truly exceptional drama wrapped in only the lightest of genre thrills. It might currently find itself swept up in Squid Game's wake, but I guarantee that, of the two, it's the show that will still be talked about a decade from now."

=== Viewership ===
With 67.52 million viewing hours in the week ending November 28, 2021, Hellbound was in 2nd place in the Global Top 10 weekly list of the most-watched TV shows (non-English).

On release, it recorded 43.48 million viewing hours in three days of release and rose to top spot in the "Netflix global TOP 10 TV (non-English) category" as per the Netflix TOP 10 website. It ranked first in the "TOP 10" in 12 countries, whereas it was listed in the "TOP 10" list in 59 countries worldwide. This is the fastest rate for a Korean series on Netflix.

It surpassed another Netflix-produced Korean drama, Squid Game, as the most popular show on Netflix on its initial release.

== Accolades ==
=== Awards and nominations ===
| Year | Award | Category | Recipient | Result | Ref. |
|---|---|---|---|---|---|
| 2022 | 20th Director's Cut Awards | Best Actor (TV) | Yoo Ah-in | Nominated | |
| 2022 | 20th Director's Cut Awards | Best Actor (TV) | Park Jeong-min | Nominated | |
| 2022 | 20th Director's Cut Awards | Best Actress (TV) | Kim Hyun-joo | Nominated | |
| 2022 | 20th Director's Cut Awards | Best Director (TV) | Yeon Sang-ho | Nominated | |
| 2022 | 20th Director's Cut Awards | Best Screenplay (TV) | Yeon Sang-ho; Choi Gyu-seok | Nominated | |
| 2022 | 20th Director's Cut Awards | Best New Actor (TV) | Kim Do Yoon | Nominated | |
| 2022 | 20th Director's Cut Awards | Best New Actress (TV) | Kim Shin-rok | Won | |
| 2022 | 58th Baeksang Arts Awards | Best Supporting Actress | Kim Shin-rok | Won | |
| 2022 | 1st Blue Dragon Series Awards | Best Supporting Actress | Kim Shin-rok | Won | |
| 2022 | APAN Star Awards | Best Supporting Actress | Kim Shin-rok | Won | |
| 2022 | APAN Star Awards | OTT Male Excellence Award | Park Jeong-min | Nominated | |
| 2022 | APAN Star Awards | OTT Female Excellence Award | Kim Hyun-joo | Nominated | |
| 2022 | APAN Star Awards | OTT Male Best Actor Award | Yoo Ah-in | Nominated | |
| 2022 | APAN Star Awards | Popularity Star Award, Actor | Yoo Ah-in | Nominated | |

=== Listicles ===
Name of publisher, year listed, name of listicle, and placement
| Publisher | Year | Listicle | Placement | Ref. |
|---|---|---|---|---|
| South China Morning Post | 2024 | The 15 best K-dramas of 2024 | 6th place | |
| Entertainment Weekly | 2025 | The 21 best Korean shows on Netflix to watch now | Top 21 | |

== See also ==
- Boogeyman
- Angels
- Demons
- Korean wave
- Christianity in Korea
