= Fifties Professionals =

2026 South Korean television series

- Promotional poster
- Hangul: 오십프로
- Lit.: Fifty Percent
- RR: Osippeuro
- MR: Osipp'ŭro
- Genre: Action comedy
- Created by: Son Jung-woo
- Written by: Jang Won-seob
- Directed by: Han Dong-hwa
- Starring: Shin Ha-kyun; Oh Jung-se; Heo Sung-tae; Lee Hak-joo; Kim Shin-rok; Kim Sang-kyung
- Country of origin: South Korea
- Original language: Korean
- No. of episodes: 12

Production
- Executive producers: Han Dong-hwa; Jang Kyung-ik; Yoo Sang-won; Jang Shin-ae; Son Jung-hyun; Park Jung-tae
- Producers: Oh Tteu-rak; Song Ah-yeon; Kim Dae-ho; Lee Yoo-bin
- Running time: 60 minutes
- Production companies: Studio Dragon; Jumbo Film

Original release
- Network: MBC TV
- Release: May 22 – June 27, 2026

Fifties Professionals (Korean: 오십프로) is a 2026 South Korean action comedy television series written by Jang Won-seob, directed by Han Dong-hwa, and starring Shin Ha-kyun, Oh Jung-se, Heo Sung-tae, Lee Hak-joo, Kim Shin-rok, and Kim Sang-kyung. The series is about three unassuming men, formerly individuals of significant influence, who are compelled by circumstance to return to their previous fields of expertise. It aired on MBC TV from May 22 to June 27, 2026 every Friday and Saturday at 21:50 (KST). It is also available for streaming on Viki and HBO Max in selected regions.

== Synopsis ==
After holding prominent positions in their respective fields, three men now live in seclusion on Yeongseon Island. Following a ten-year hiatus, a series of events compels them to utilize the professional skills and instincts they had previously suppressed. As they navigate the physical challenges associated with middle age, the trio initiates a mission to uncover the facts behind the specific incident that led to their displacement a decade ago.

== Cast and characters ==
=== Main ===
- Shin Ha-kyun as Jeong Heo-myung
- Oh Jung-se as Bong Je-soon (Bulge)
- Heo Sung-tae as Kang Bum-ryong
- Lee Hak-joo as Ma Gong-bok
- Kim Shin-rok as Prosecutor Kang (Kang Young-ae)
- Kim Sang-kyung as Han Kyung-wook

=== Supporting ===
People around Heo-myung

- Kim Sang-ho as Team Leader Jo (Jo Sung-won)
- Shin Dong-mi as Kwon Oh-ran
- Lee Han-wi as President Kwon (Kwon Seok-jin)

People around Je-soon

- Jung Seok-yong as Ri Cheol-jin
- Kim Seong-jeong as Heo Nam-il
- Kim Chae-eun as Lee Ye-ji

People around Bum-ryong

- Hyun Bong-sik as Yu In-goo
- Kim Byeong-ok as Hwang Hwa-san
- Han Ji-eun as Park Mi-kyung

Others

- Kwon Yul as Chairman Do (Do Hyun-tae)
- Lee Soon-won as Geum Jang-sik

== Production ==
=== Development ===
The series is a collaborative production between Studio Dragon and Jumbo Film, with MBC overseeing the planning and broadcasting. Director Han Dong-hwa, noted for his work on genre-defining dramas such as Bad Guys 2 (2017–2018) and Shadow Detective series (2022–2023), was appointed to lead the project. The script was written by Jang Won-seob. The production team aimed to blend "realistic action" with "salty comedy", focusing on the domestic and professional struggles of middle-aged protagonists—a demographic often referred to in the Korean title (a wordplay on "50%" (Note: "50%" refers to the protagonists being in their 50s, having lived roughly a half of their expected lifespan.) and "50s Pros" (Note: "50s Pros" shortened name of the English title.)).

=== Casting ===
Shin Ha-kyun, Oh Jung-se, and Heo Sung-tae were cast as the central trio in November 2025. In late 2025 to early 2026, additional cast members were announced. Lee Hak-joo joined to provide a younger counterpoint to the veteran leads. Kim Sang-ho was cast following his role in Typhoon Family (2025). Kwon Yul was cast in the antagonist role. Shin Dong-mi was cast as spouse to Shin Ha-kyun's character. And Kim Shin-rok's casting as a police-turned-prosecutor was confirmed.

== Release ==
In December 2025, MBC included Fifties Professional in its 2026 drama programming slate. The series is scheduled to premiere on MBC TV on May 22, 2026, and will air every Friday and Saturday at 21:50 (KST). It will also be available for streaming on Viki and HBO Max in selected regions.

== Viewership ==
Fifties Professionals : South Korea viewers per episode (thousands)

Season	Episode number												Average
Season	1	2	3	4	5	6	7	8	9	10	11	12	Average
1	799	714	960	939	852	878	963	877	969	925	1022	940	903

Source: Audience measurement performed nationwide by Nielsen Korea.

Average TV viewership ratings
Ep.	Original broadcast date	Average audience share (Nielsen Korea)	
Ep.	Original broadcast date	Nationwide	Seoul
1	May 22, 2026	4.4% (9th)	4.5% (7th)
2	May 23, 2026	3.6% (10th)	3.7% (6th)
3	May 29, 2026	5.5% (6th)	5.6% (5th)
4	May 30, 2026	5.2% (4th)	5.0% (4th)
5	June 5, 2026	4.8% (6th)	5.0% (5th)
6	June 6, 2026	4.8% (6th)	4.8% (5th)
7	June 12, 2026	5.3% (8th)	5.2% (8th)
8	June 13, 2026	4.9% (4th)	4.9% (4th)
9	June 19, 2026	5.6% (6th)	5.6% (5th)
10	June 20, 2026	4.8% (6th)	5.1% (3rd)
11	June 26, 2026	6.0% (4th)	6.3% (4th)
12	June 27, 2026	5.0% (4th)	5.3% (4th)
Average		5.0%	5.1%
In the table above, the blue numbers represent the lowest ratings and the red numbers represent the highest ratings.
