= Gong Seung-yeon =

South Korean actress (born 1993)

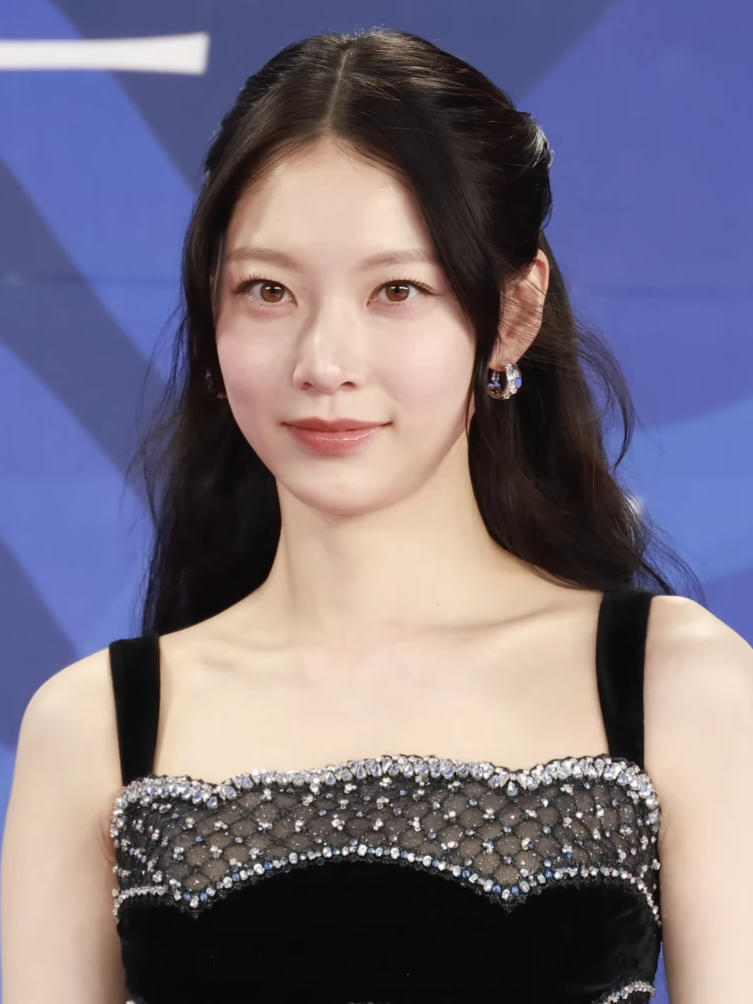
- Gong in July 2025
- Born: Yoo Seung-yeon; February 27, 1993 (age 33); Seoul, South Korea
- Education: Sungshin Women's University
- Occupation: Actress
- Years active: 2012–present
- Agent: Varo Entertainment
- Relatives: Jeongyeon (sister)

Korean name
- Hangul: 유승연
- RR: Yu Seungyeon
- MR: Yu Sŭngyŏn

Stage name
- Hangul: 공승연
- RR: Gong Seungyeon
- MR: Kong Sŭngyŏn

Yoo Seung-yeon (Korean: 유승연; born February 27, 1993), better known by the stage name Gong Seung-yeon (공승연), is a South Korean actress. She is best known for her roles in the film Aloners (2021) and television series such as Six Flying Dragons (2015–2016), The Master of Revenge (2016), Introverted Boss (2017), Circle (2017), Are You Human? (2018), Flower Crew: Joseon Marriage Agency (2018), Bulgasal: Immortal Souls (2021–2022), The First Responders (2022–2023), and Perfect Crown (2026).

== Early life and education ==
Gong was born as Yoo Seung-yeon in Seoul on February 27, 1993. She is the older sister of Twice's Yoo Jeong-yeon. Their father, Yoo Chang-joon, was a private chef for former president Kim Dae-jung, as well as a head chef of the Seoul Plaza Hotel for over 20 years, specializing in Korean cuisine. She graduated from Sungshin Women's University.

== Career ==
=== 2012–2014: Career beginnings ===
Gong first trained as a singer under SM Entertainment for seven years after winning the "Best Looks" portion of the SM Youth Best Contest in 2005. She left in 2012 after losing interest in singing, and then signed an actor management contract with Yuko Company.

Shortly after making her entertainment debut in a commercial for feminine hygiene product White (Yuhan-Kimberly) in 2012, Gong began appearing in small roles in television dramas.

=== 2015–present: Rise in popularity ===
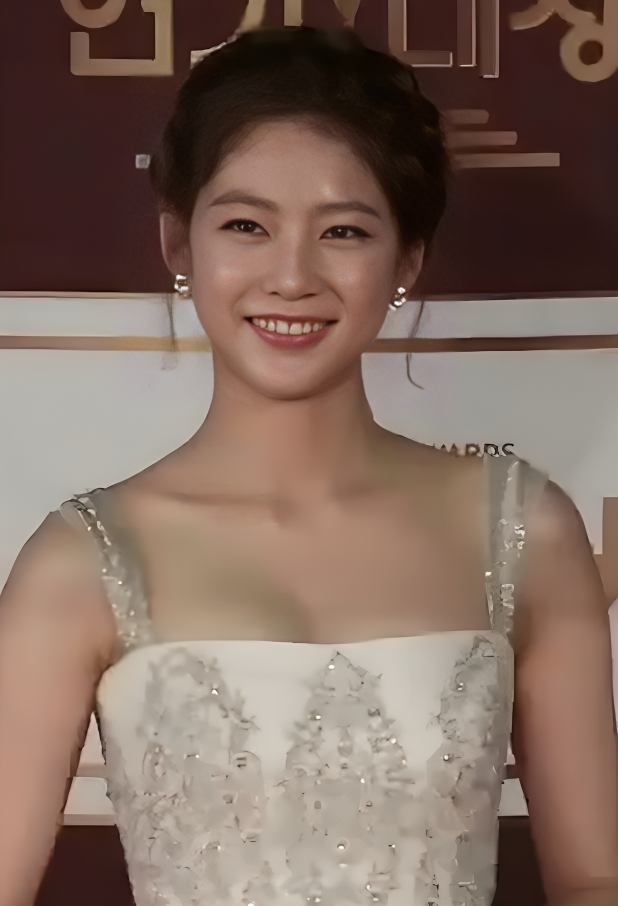
Gong in 2016

In 2015, the relative newcomer drew mainstream notice when she joined the fourth season of the Korean reality show We Got Married, where she was paired with singer-actor Lee Jong-hyun.

Gong started to gain attention as an actress with her role in the historical drama Six Flying Dragons (2015–2016). She won the New Star Award at the SBS Drama Awards. Gong was also casts in the revenge series The Master of Revenge. She was then cast in her first leading role in youth sageuk My Only Love Song, which co-stars her We Got Married partner Lee Jong-hyun. The drama premiered on Netflix in 2017. In 2017, Gong starred in tvN's romantic comedy Introverted Boss. The same year, she took on a lead role in science fiction mystery series Circle.

It was announced that Gong signed with BH Entertainment in March 2018, after her contract with Yuko Company expired and both her and the company decided not to renew. In 2018, she starred in KBS' science fiction romance drama Are You Human? with Seo Kang-joon. She also starred in the short film My Dream Class, and sang the theme song for the movie. In 2019, Gong was cast in the historical romance drama Flower Crew: Joseon Marriage Agency.

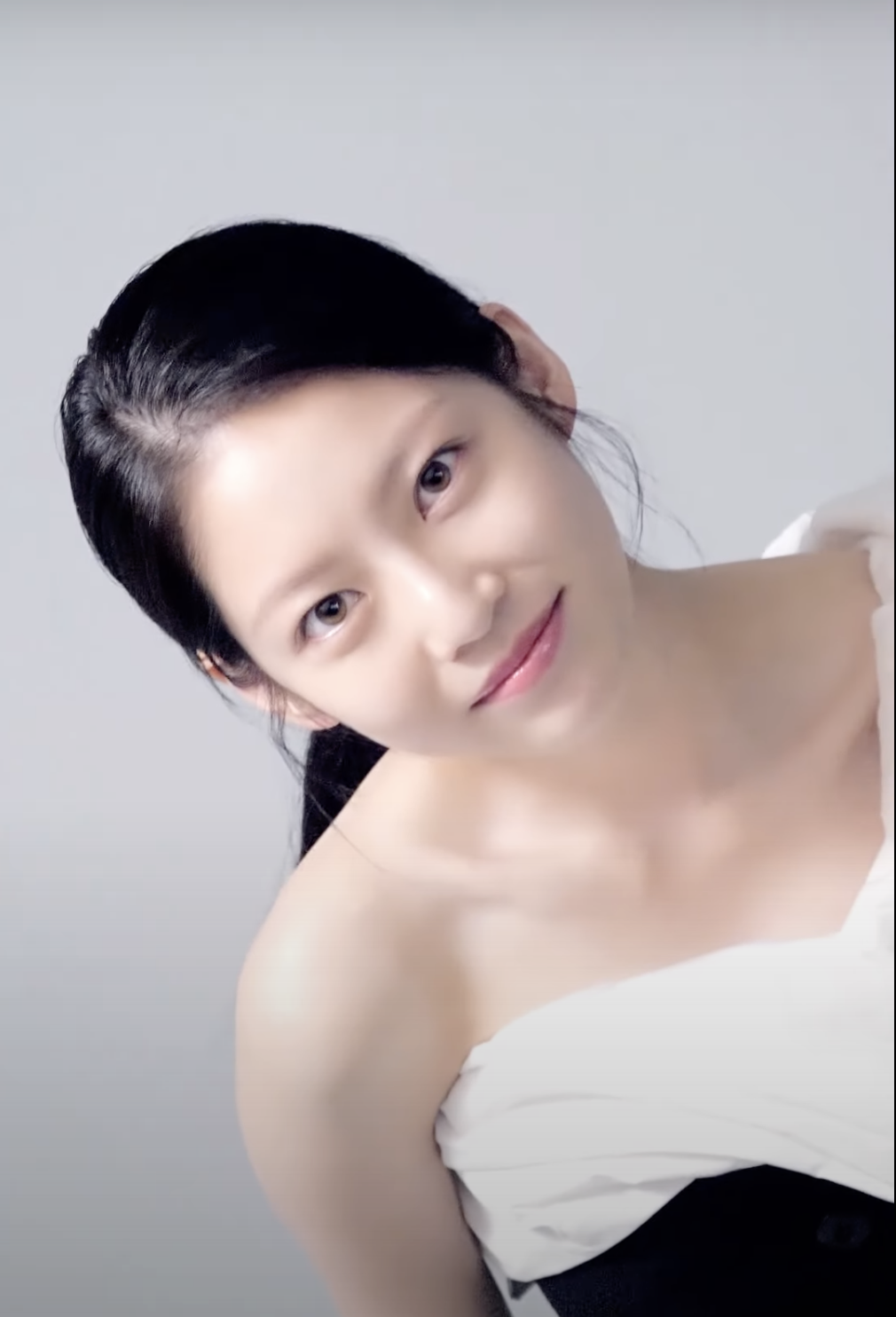
Gong for Elle Korea in 2019

On July 13, 2020, Gong signed with a new agency, Varo Entertainment. It was also announced that Gong has been cast in the upcoming film Handsome Guys alongside Lee Hee-joon. In March 2021, Gong was confirmed to be starring in tvN's fantasy drama Bulgasal: Immortal Souls which aired in December 2021. Gong was recognised for her work in the film Aloners where she has won multiple awards, including the "Best New Actress" award at the 42nd Blue Dragon Film Awards.

In 2022, Gong was cast in the SBS drama The First Responders alongside Kim Rae-won and Son Ho-jun. The second season premiered in 2023.

In 2025, Gong starred in Netflix's crime thriller television series Karma directed by Lee Il-hyung. It is based on the Kakao webtoon of the same name by Choi Hee-seon, about people who are unexpectedly entangled and destroy each other while pursuing their own desires.

Gong starred as Queen Dowager Yoon Yi-rang in the television series Perfect Crown in 2026. She was praised for her performance and interpretation of her character. Maeil Business Newspaper deemed Gong a standout, while OSEN's Ha Su-jeong wrote that she "exuded charisma as the Queen Dowager". Pop culture critic Ha Jae-geun commented to Ilgan Sports that Gong "held the center [of the series] well with her very serious and weighty acting," adding that "she has been an actress who has shown great acting skills, but she is shining even brighter in this work".

== Filmography ==
=== Film ===
Year	Title	Role	Notes	Ref.
2018	My Dream Class	Jeong-seok	Short film	
2021	Aloners	Jin Ah		
2022	LOVE SICK	Ji-yoon	Re-BORN film version of 'Re-Re-Project	
2024	Handsome Guys	Kim Mi-na		
2026	Number One	Ryeo-eun		

=== Television series ===
Year	Title	Role	Notes	Ref.
2012	I Love Lee Taly	Mi-mi		
2014	My Lovely Girl	Seo Yoon-ji		
2015	Heard It Through the Grapevine	Seo Noo-ri		
2015	Six Flying Dragons	Min Da-kyung (Queen Wongyeong)		
2016	The Master of Revenge	Kim Da-hae		
2016	The Sound of Your Heart	Yerim	Cameo	
2017	Introverted Boss	Eun Yi-soo		
2017	Circle	Han Jung-yeon / Byul		
2017	My Only Love Song	Song Soo-jung		
2017	Meloholic	Nurse	Cameo	
2017	Drama Festa: "Midsummer's Memory"		Cameo	
2018	Are You Human?	Kang So-bong		
2019	Flower Crew: Joseon Marriage Agency	Gae Ddong / Yoon Soo-yun		
2021	Drama Stage: "Proxy Emotion"	Shin Seo-rim	Season 4	
2021–2022	Bulgasal: Immortal Souls	Dan Sol / Min Si-ho		
2022–2023	The First Responders	Song Seol	Season 1–2	
2025	My Lovely Journey	Kang Ye-reum		
2025	Karma	Lee Yu-jeong		
2026	Perfect Crown	Queen Dowager Yoon Yi-rang		

=== Television shows ===
Year	Title	Role	Notes	Ref.
2015	We Got Married - Season 4	Cast member	Episodes 263–286; with Lee Jong-hyun	
2016	Eat Sleep Eat in Krabi	Cast member	with Lee Seung-hoon	
2020	Law of the Jungle – Hunter and Chef	Cast member	Episodes 420–422	

=== Hosting ===
Year	Title	Notes	Ref.
2016–2017	Inkigayo	with Jeongyeon and Kim Min-seok; July 3, 2016 – January 22, 2017	

=== Music video appearances ===
Year	Song Title	Artist	Ref.
2012	"Do It"	Sunny Hill	
2014	"Over the Destiny"	2AM	
2015	"Me, Myself"	Shin Seung-hun	
2016	"#Like"	Fiestar	
2017	"When I Was In Love" (short film)	Pentagon	
2019	"Song Request"	Lee So-ra ft. Suga	

== Discography ==
=== Soundtrack appearances ===
Title	Year	Album
"Like a Star" (with Jeongyeon)	2018	My Dream Class OST

== Ambassadorship ==
Year	Organization/Event	Notes	Ref.
2014	Korean National Tuberculosis Association	Honorary Ambassador	
2016	The 8th DMZ International Documentary Film Festival	Honorary Ambassador	

== Accolades ==
=== Awards and nominations ===
Name of the award ceremony, year presented, category, nominee of the award, and the result of the nomination
Award ceremony	Year	Category	Nominee / Work	Result	Ref.
Asia Artist Awards	2017	New Wave Award	Gong Seung-yeon	Won	
Asian Film Awards	2021	Best Newcomer	Aloners	Nominated	
Baeksang Arts Awards	2017	Best New Actress – Television	The Master of Revenge	Nominated	
Baeksang Arts Awards	2022	Best New Actress – Film	Aloners	Nominated	
Baeksang Arts Awards	2025	Best Supporting Actress – Film	Handsome Guys	Nominated	
Blue Dragon Film Awards	2021	Best New Actress	Aloners	Won	
Blue Dragon Series Awards	2025	Best Supporting Actress	Karma	Nominated	
Director's Cut Awards	2022	Best New Actress in film	Aloners	Nominated	
Jeonju International Film Festival	2021	Korean Competition Category Actor Award	Aloners	Won	
KBS Drama Awards	2016	Best New Actress	The Master of Revenge	Nominated	
KBS Drama Awards	2018	Best Couple	Gong Seung-yeon (with Seo Kang-joon); Are You Human?	Won	
KBS Drama Awards	2018	Excellence Award, Actress in a Mid-length Drama	Are You Human?	Nominated	
Korean Association of Film Critics Awards	2021	Best New Actress	Aloners	Won	
SBS Drama Awards	2015	New Star Award	Six Flying Dragons & Heard It Through the Grapevine	Won	
SBS Drama Awards	2022	Excellence Award, Actress in a Miniseries Genre/Fantasy Drama	The First Responders	Won	
SBS Drama Awards	2023	Top Excellence Award, Actress in a Seasonal Drama	The First Responders 2	Nominated	
SBS Entertainment Awards	2016	Newcomer Award (Female)	Gong Seung-yeon (with Jeongyeon); Inkigayo	Won	
SM Youth Best Contest	2005	Best Face	Yoo Seung-yeon	Won	
The Seoul Awards	2017	Best New Actress (Drama)	Introverted Boss	Nominated	
Torino Film Festival	2021	Best Actress Award	Aloners	Won	
Wildflower Film Awards	2022	Best New Actor/Actress	Aloners	Nominated	

=== Listicles ===
Name of publisher, year listed, name of listicle, and placement
Publisher	Year	Listicle	Placement	Ref.
Cine21	2021	New Actress to watch out for in 2022	6th (Note: Tied with Go Min-si, Park Eun-bin, Keum Sae-rok, Joo Hyun-young, Park Gyu-young, Lee Soo-kyung, Roh Yoon-seo, Gong Seung-yeon, Lee Se-young, IU, Keum Sae-rok, Park Ji-hu, Han So-hee, Jung Ji-so, Bang Min-ah, Jeon Jong-seo, Roh Jeong-eui)	
