= Kim Shin-rok =

South Korean actress (born 1981)

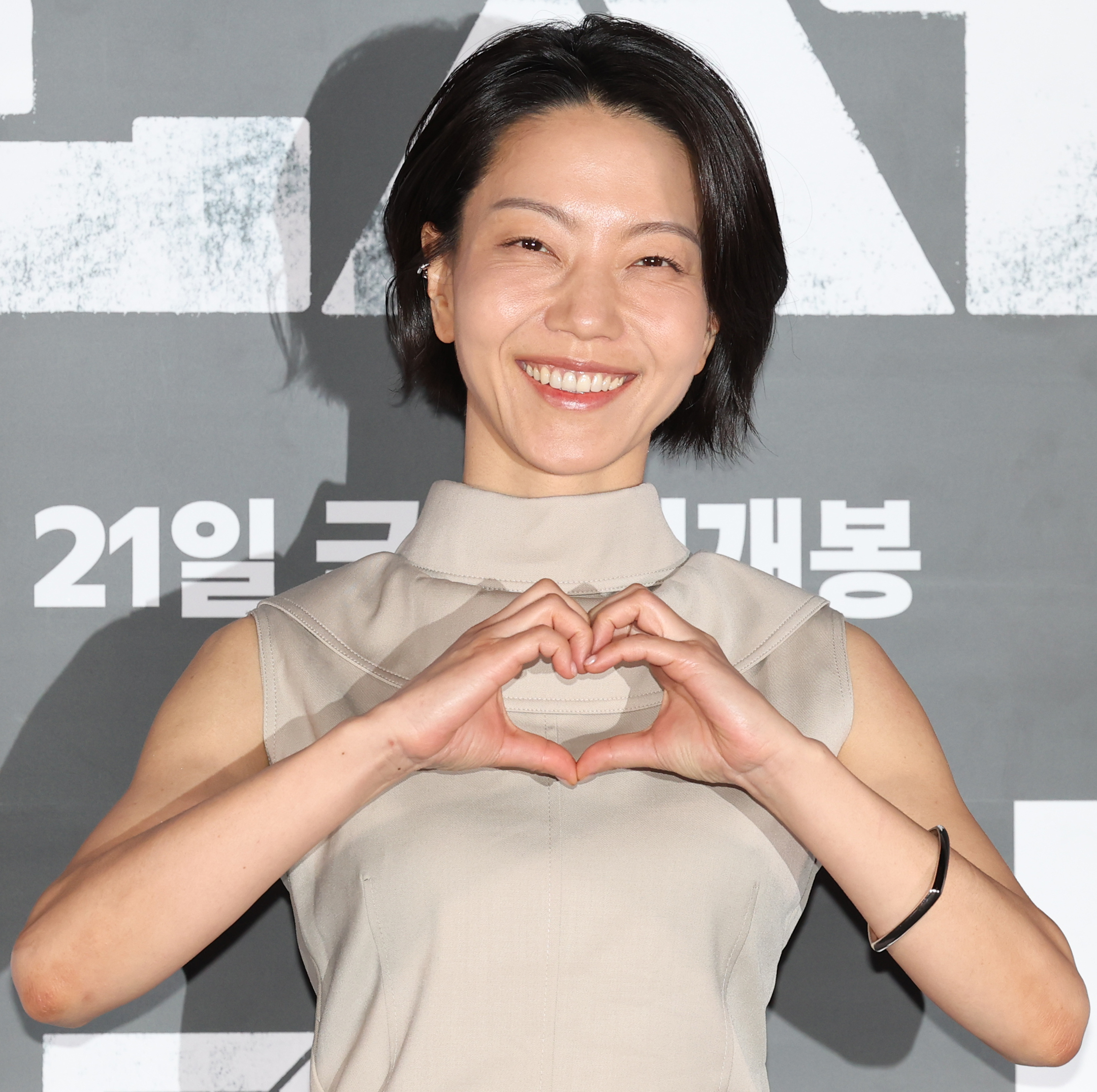
- Kim in 2026
- Born: March 24, 1981 (age 45); Gokseong County, South Jeolla Province, South Korea
- Education: Seoul National University; Hanyang University
- Occupation: Actress
- Years active: 2004–present
- Agent: Just Entertainment
- Spouse: Park Kyung-chan (m. 2016)

Korean name
- Hangul: 김신록
- Hanja: 金新綠
- RR: Gim Sinrok
- MR: Kim Sillok

Kim Shin-rok (Korean: 김신록; born March 24, 1981) is a South Korean actress. She gained recognition for her supporting roles in 2021 television series Beyond Evil, Hellbound, One Ordinary Day, and Reborn Rich.

== Early life and education ==
Kim Shin-rok was born on March 24, 1981 in Gokseong County, South Jeolla Province. The second of four daughters, her father named her "Shin-rok" (Korean: 신록; Hanja: 新綠), meaning "new green," a term that refers to the fresh green color of new leaves emerging in early spring or summer. Her father, a former actor, sparked her interest in acting by taking her to a local theater and encouraging her to "look at the person, not the acting." Despite this interest, she majored in geography at Seoul National University, though she did join the university's theater club.

== Career ==
=== Beginning ===
After graduating, Kim worked various internships. A friend saw an audition notice for the play, which had won that year's Spring Literary Contest. She landed the lead role after auditioning, and made her debut in the 2004 play Survival Calendar as leading role.

The director of the play advised her to formally study theater, leading her to enroll in graduate school. She earned a Master of Arts in Theater and Film from Hanyang University and later a Bachelor of Arts in acting from the Korean Academy of Arts and Sciences. During this period, she recalled, "Every day was a grind, juggling theater and school... I was consumed by a vague, reckless desire to 'I could do it if you just let me!' and it was painful. I was mired in feelings of unhappiness and misfortune."

=== Breaktrough roles ===
Kim considers her role in the 2018–2019 play The Critic a breakthrough. Originally written for two men, the production featured two women in the lead roles, which she felt pushed her limits as an actress and helped her gain recognition. Her role in the 2020 tvN drama The Cursed was another turning point, as it provided her with the opportunity to actively pursue a career in visual media. This role led to her casting in the series Hellbound, which she credits for her international recognition.

== Personal life ==
Kim married actor Park Kyung-chan in 2016. She has described him as her greatest supporter and ally.

== Filmography ==
Key
†	Denotes films that have not yet been released

=== Film ===
Year	Title	Role	Notes	Ref.
2005	Rules of Dating	Teacher 1		
2008	Dimmer	Da-eun		
2018	Burning	Shin-rok		
2024	Uprising	Beom-dong		
2025	Project Y	Ga-yeong		
2026	Colony	Choi Hyun-hee		

=== Television ===
Year	Title	Role	Notes	Ref.
2020	The Cursed	Seok-hee		
2021	Beyond Evil	Oh Ji-hwa		
2021–2024	Hellbound	Park Jeong-ja	Season 1–2	
2021	One Ordinary Day	Ahn Tae-hee		
2022	If You Wish Upon Me	Hye-jin	Cameo	
2022	Reborn Rich	Jin Hwa-young		
2023	Moving	Yeo Woon-gyu		
2023	Shadow Detective	Yeon Yeon-hyeon	Season 2	
2023	The Kidnapping Day	Seo Hye-eun		
2023–2024	Sweet Home	Chief Ji	Season 2–3	
2024	Queen of Tears	Hyeon-suk	Cameo (episode 12–13)	
2025	Undercover High School	Seo Myung-ju		
2025	Tastefully Yours	Jin Myeong-sook		
2026	Fifties Professionals	Kang Young-ae		

== Theater ==
Theater play performance
Year	Title		Role	Theater	Date	Ref.
Year	English	Korean	Role	Theater	Date	Ref.
2004	Survival Calendar	서바이벌 캘린더		Hyehwadong 1-beonji Theater		
2005	Survival Calendar	서바이벌 캘린더		Hyehwadong 1-beonji Theater	November 10, 2005 to November 27, 2005	
2005	Come&Go			Club Bread		
2006	It was probably late summer			Hyehwa-dong 1 small theatre		
2006	The Lovers		Sarah	Hyehwa-dong 1 Small Theater		
2006	Fedra	페드라		Arts Center Free Small Theatre		
2007	RIAU			Gwangju Culture and Arts Center Small Theater		
2007	Hamlet of the East	동방의 햄릿		Oriental Odeon Theatre, Beijing, China	March 7 to 30	
2007	Tree Story			Later Performing Arts Center		
2009	Jang Seok-jo's People	장석조네 사람들		Yeonwoo Small Theater (Daehangno)	May 13, 2009 to June 14, 2009	
2009	Republic of Korea 2030 - Who Will Save Korea's 20s?	대한민국 2030 - 누가 대한민국 20대를 구원할 것인가?		Yeonwoo Small Theater (Daehangno)	July 8, 2009 to July 19, 2009	
2010	Where Did Today's Book Disappear?	오늘의 책은 어디로 사라졌을까?	Yoo-jung	Mimaji Art Center Green Theater	February 23, 2010 to May 9, 2010	
2010	Cape outing			Geumcheon Art Factory/ Tongui-dong security hotel		
2010	Hamlet Machine-Prototype			Cafe Entresite		
2010	Tell the child			Daehak-ro Arts Theater 3		
2010	Spring Writer Winter Stage - Second Group	봄작가 겨울무대 - 두번째 그룹	Actress, Birth of a Masterpiece	Arko Arts Theater Small Theater	December 11, 2010 to December 14, 2010	
2011	Jang Seok-jo's People	장석조네 사람들	Naju-daek, Sangju-daek	Daehangno Arts Theater Grand Theater	March 17, 2011 to March 27, 2011	
2012	You Forever	영원한 너		Arko Arts Theater Small Theater	July 4, 2012 to July 15, 2012	
2012	Ro Pung-chan's Wandering Troupe	로풍찬 유랑극장	Yang Jung-soon	Yeonwoo Small Theater (Daehangno)	October 11, 2012 to November 4, 2012	
2012	Distorted			Seoul Station 284		
2012	Cafe Variation			NY Live Arts		
2013	Mom Disappeared	엄마가 사라졌다		L Studio	May 9, 2013 to May 18, 2013	
2013	The King and I	왕과 나		Doosan Art Center Space111	July 4, 2013 to August 3, 2013	
2014	A Serious Banquet			NY Theater Workshop		
2014	This is How I Don't Know How to Dance			NY TBG Theatre		
2014	Just Duet, Hello From Vulsa	저스트 듀엣: 헬로 프롬 벌사		Hongdae Post Theatre		
2014	Just Duet, The Passagio	저스트 듀엣, 더 파사지오		Hongdae Post Theatre	October 28, 2014 - October 31, 2014	
2015	The Story of Ikaino	이카이노 이야기	Soon-ae	Hyehwadong 1-beonji Theater Lab	February 11, 2015 to February 15, 2015	
2016	A Winter's Tale	겨울이야기	Aristocrat, etc.	National Theater of Korea Daloreum Theater	January 10, 2016 to January 24, 2016	
2016	Purgatory	연옥	Woman	Ye Green Theater	April 22, 2016 to May 15, 2016	
2016	The Power	더 파워		Myeongdong Theater	October 26, 2016 to November 13, 2016	
2017	Hanminjok Diaspora Festival - Songs of the Dragons Flying to Heaven	한민족디아스포라전 - 용비어천가	Korean	Baekseonghui Jangminho Theater	June 1, 2017 to June 11, 2017	
2017	2017 Yoon Young-sun Festival - Party	2017 윤영선 페스티벌 - 파티		Daehangno Seondol Theater	August 31, 2017 to September 10, 2017	
2017	Working Holiday	워킹 홀리데이		Doosan Art Center Space111	November 7, 2017 to November 26, 2017	
2018	Nine Girls	아홉소녀들		Dongyang Arts Theater Hall 2	March 22, 2018 to April 8, 2018	
2018	Critic	비평가	Scarpa	Doosan Art Center Space111	August 17, 2018 to September 1, 2018	
2019	Doosan Humanities Theater 2019 Apartment - There Is a Lot of Shit in Nokcheon	두산인문극장 2019 아파트 - 녹천에는 똥이 많다		Doosan Art Center Space111	May 14, 2019 to June 8, 2019	
2019	Critic	비평가	Scarpa	Daehangno Arts Theater Small Theater	June 27, 2019 to July 7, 2019	
2019	The Happiness of a Walker	산책자의 행복		Samilro Changgo Theater	November 8, 2019 to November 17, 2019	
2020	Fearless - The High School Macbeth	피어리스 - 더 하이스쿨 맥베스	Drunk Girl Caroline	Sejong Center S Theater	January 9, 2020 to January 19, 2020	
2020	Play Series 8 - Mouthpiece	연극열전8 - 마우스피스	Libby	Yes24 Art One Hall 2	July 11, 2020 to September 6, 2020	
2020	Out of Love	아웃 오브 러브	Rona	Daehangno Seondol Theater	January 22, 2021 to January 31, 2021	
2022	Mouthpiece	마우스피스	Libby	Yes24 Art One Hall 2	November 12, 2021 to January 30, 2022	
2022	Repairing the Living	살아있는 자를 수선하기	Narrator, etc.	Lee Hae-rang Arts Theater	July 26, 2022 to September 4, 2022	
2024	Repairing the Living	살아있는 자를 수선하기	Narrator, etc.	National Jeongdong Theater	January 20, 2024 to March 10, 2024	
2025	Prima Facie	프리마 파시	Tessa	Chungmu Art Center Black Small Theater	August 27, 2025 to November 2, 2025	

== Awards and nominations ==
Name of the award ceremony, year presented, category, nominee of the award, and the result of the nomination
Award ceremony	Year	Category	Nominee / Work	Result	Ref.
APAN Star Awards	2022	Best Supporting Actress	Hellbound	Won	
APAN Star Awards	2025	Excellence Acting Award, Actress	Undercover High School; Tastefully Yours	Won	
Baeksang Arts Awards	2020	Best Actress – Theater	Nokcheon Has Fields of Sh*t	Nominated	
Baeksang Arts Awards	2022	Best Supporting Actress – Television	Hellbound	Won	
Baeksang Arts Awards	2023	Best Supporting Actress – Television	Reborn Rich	Nominated	
Baeksang Arts Awards	2026	Best Acting – Theater	Prima Facie	Won	
Blue Dragon Film Awards	2026	Best Supporting Actress	Colony	Pending	
Blue Dragon Series Awards	2022	Best Supporting Actress	Hellbound	Won	
Director's Cut Awards	2022	Best New Actress	Hellbound	Won	
Interpark Golden Ticket Awards	2023	Best Actress in a Play	Mouthpieces; Mending the Living	Nominated	
MBC Drama Awards	2025	Best Supporting Actress	Undercover High School	Won	
