= Oh Eui-shik =

South Korean actor

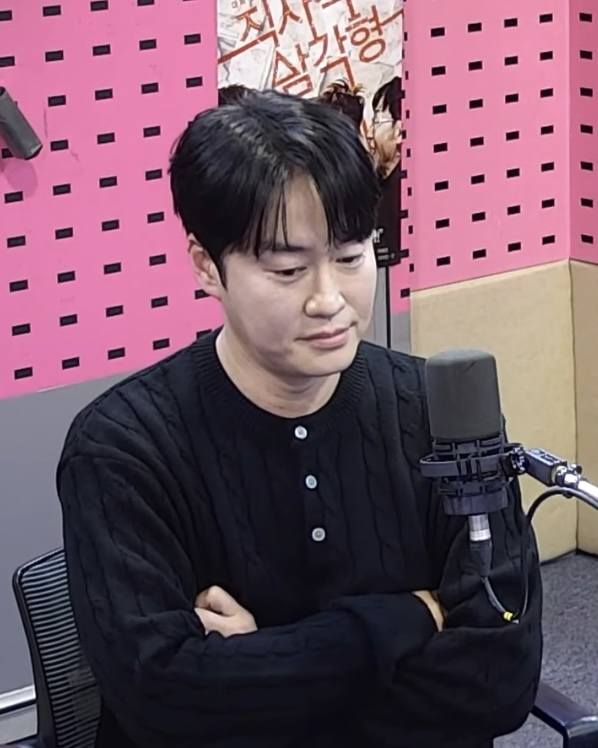
- Oh in 2026
- Born: Oh Eui-shik; 1 November 1983 (age 43); Jeju Province, South Korea
- Occupations: Actor; model; theater actor
- Years active: 2005–present
- Agent: Highzium Studio
- Spouse: Unknown
- Children: Oh Seon-yul
- Relatives: Oh In-ha (brother)

Korean name
- Hangul: 오의식
- Hanja: 呉義植
- RR: O Uisik
- MR: O Ŭisik

Oh Eui-shik (Korean: 오의식, born November 1, 1983) is a South Korean actor. Oh made his musical debut in 2006 and has since built up his acting skills in a number of plays and television drama. He is known for roles in television dramas such as Oh My Ghost, Love in the Moonlight, Hi Bye, Mama!, Wok of Love, and True Beauty.

== Early life ==
Oh Eui-sik was born on November 1, 1983, in Jeju, where he resided until his early twenties. Oh relocated to Seoul in his early twenties to work in the interior design industry. His office was located in Daehakro, akin to Off-Broadway. Oh developed an interest in theater after frequently attending stage productions in the Dahakro. Inspired by these performances, he decided to pursue a career in acting. He later remarked, "At that time, I was just waiting for my time to get off work and felt bored with my work life. I thought that if I became an actor, I wouldn’t have to wait for work hours."

== Career ==
Oh made his stage debut in 2006, appearing in the children's musical Bremen Musician. In 2007, he appeared in director Wi Seong-shin's musical Five Sketches of Love, an open-run production in Daehangno. The musical explores five romantic vignettes set in a motel.

In 2009, Oh joined the cast of the musical Rocksitter. The musical, an adaptation of Lee Geun-sam's play Fishing Field War, portrays the unexpected encounter and evolving relationship between a bank clerk and a 60-year-old restaurant owner at a fishing spot. Oh and actress Lee Bong-ryun played multiple characters, including collectors, coffee shop owners, adulterous couples, elderly couples, and rescue workers.

In 2013, Oh officially became a member of the theater company Ganda. Me and Grandpa, a play written by Min Jun-ho, was his first project with Theater Ganda. In 2014, Oh played a bar owner in the play Shall we go to karaoke and talk? The play depicts various episodes unfolding in a karaoke room. This production was the fourth work presented as part of the Ganda Theater Company's 10th-anniversary celebration.

He was discovered onstage by director Yoo Je-won who offered him to audition for role in his television drama. He co-starred as kitchen assistant Choi Ji-woong in tvN fantasy drama series Oh My Ghost (2015), starring Jo Jung-suk, Park Bo-young, Kim Seul-gi and Kwak Si-yang.

In 2021, Oh made a special appearance in Yoo Je-won's drama series Hometown Cha-Cha-Cha as Park Jung-woo, a college friend of Hong Du-sik. In June 2022, Oh signed an exclusive contract with Highzium Studio.

== Filmography ==
=== Film ===
List of Film(s)
Year	Title		Role	Ref.
Year	English	Korean	Role	Ref.
2014	Slow Video	슬로우 비디오	Extra	
2017	Confidential Assignment	공조	Lee Dae-pal	
2019	The Odd Family: Zombie On Sale	기묘한 가족	Officer Choi	
2024	Revolver	리볼버	Hong In-gi	

=== Television series ===
List of Television series
Year	Title		Role	Note	Ref.
Year	English	Korean	Role	Note	Ref.
2015	Oh My Ghost	오 나의 귀신님	Choi Ji-wung		
2015	KBS Drama Special: Contract Man	KBS 드라마 스페셜: 계약의 사내	Choi Do-seok		
2016	Pied Piper	피리부는 사나이	Choi Sung-bum		
2016	Love in the Moonlight	구르미 그린 달빛	Sung-yeol		
2016	Weightlifting Fairy Kim Bok-joo	역도요정 김복주	Bang Woon-ki		
2017	Circle	써클: 이어진 두 세계	Lee Dong-soo		
2017	Fight for My Way	쌈 마이웨이	Manager Oh		
2017	While You Were Sleeping	당신이 잠든 사이에	Bong Doo-hyun		
2017	Two Cops	투깝스	Lee Ho-tae		
2018	Wok of Love	기름진 멜로	Maeng Sam-seon		
2018	Are You Human?	너도 인간이니?	Cha Hyun-jun		
2018	Familiar Wife	아는 와이프	Oh Sang-shik		
2018	My Healing Love	내사랑 치유기	Jo-min		
2018	The Hymn of Death	사의 찬미	Hong Hae-sung		
2019	Romance Is a Bonus Book	로맨스는 별책부록	Hong Dong-min		
2019	Touch Your Heart	진심이 닿다	Gong Hyuk-joon		
2019	When the Devil Calls Your Name	악마가 너의 이름을 부를 때	Kang-ha / Jung In-seok		
2020	Hi Bye, Mama!	하이바이, 마마!	Gye Geun-sang		
2020	Once Again	한 번 다녀왔습니다	Oh Jeong-bong		
2020	My Unfamiliar Family	(아는 건 별로 없지만) 가족입니다	Woo-seok		
2020	True Beauty	여신강림	Han Joon-woo		
2021	Joseon Exorcist	조선구마사	Ji-gyeom		
2021	Hometown Cha-Cha-Cha	갯마을 차차차	Jung-woo	Cameo	
2022	Shooting Stars	별똥별	Cha Min-ho	Cameo (episode 6)	
2022	Big Mouth	빅마우스	Kim Soon-tae		
2023	Crash Course in Romance	일타 스캔들	Nam Jae-woo		
2023	The First Responders	소방서 옆 경찰서	Kang Do-ha	Season 2	
2023	Castaway Diva	무인도의 디바	Reporter Bong Du-Hyeon		
2024	Crash	크래시	Lee Tae-joo		
2024	Knight Flower	밤에 피는 꽃	Seok Jeong		
2024	The Judge from Hell	지옥에서 온 판사	Choi Won-jung	Cameo	
2025	Undercover High School	언더커버 하이스쿨	Jeong Jae-Hyeon		
2025	My Dearest Nemesis	그놈은 흑염룡	TVXQ-tip		
2025	Bon Appétit, Your Majesty	폭군의 셰프	Im Sung-jae		
2026	Happy Anding	뜨거운 안녕	Kang Hyeon-gu		

== Stage ==
=== Musical ===
List of Musical Play(s)
Year	Title		Role	Theater	Date	Ref.
Year	English	Korean	Role	Theater	Date	Ref.
2006	Children's Musical Bremen Conservatory	어린이뮤지컬 브레멘 음악대	Donkey	National Jeongdong Theater (Seoul)	Apr 14–May 21	
2006–2007	Five Sketches about Love	사랑에 관한 다섯개의 소묘	Virgin Man	Hansung Art Hall 2	Mar 13–Jun 15	
2008	Five Sketches about Love	사랑에 관한 다섯개의 소묘	Virgin Man	Former BNK Busan Bank Joeun Theater 2	Nov 28–Dec 31	
2008–2009	Five Sketches about Love	사랑에 관한 다섯개의 소묘	Virgin Man	Daehakro TOM Hall 2	Nov 07– Jan 24	
2009	Rock Sitter	락시터	multi-male	Daehangno Small Theater Festival	Jun 19–Aug 16	
2009	Rock Sitter	락시터	multi-male	Former BNK Busan Bank Joeun Theater 2	Aug 21–Sep 20	
2010	Organic Musical Bachelor's Vegetable Shop 2.0	유기농 뮤지컬 총각네 야채가게 2.0	Son Ji-hwan	CJ Azit Daehangno (formerly SM Art Hall)	January 15, 2010 - June 30, 2010	
2010	Rock Sitter	락시터	multi-male	Former BNK Busan Bank Joeun Theater 2	Feb 8–Mar 31	
2010	Rock Sitter	락시터	multi-male	Guro Art Valley Arts Theater	Mar 3–6	
2011	Rock Sitter	락시터	multi-male	Daehakro Small Theater Festival	Mar 5–Jul 31	
2011	Rock Sitter	락시터	multi-male	Former BNK Busan Bank Joeun Theater 2	Jun 3–Jul 31	
2013	Superman Embracing the Moon	달을 품은 슈퍼맨	Do-hyun	Daehakro Space Owl	May 10, 2013 – September 1, 2013	
2013	Seat Show	자리주쇼		Ye Green Theatre	December 16, 2013	
2013–2014	Agatha	아가사	Paul/Newman	Lee Hae-rang Arts Theater	12.31–02.23	
2014	Agatha	아가사	Paul/Newman	Yes 24 Stage 2	03.01–04.27	
2014	Two Weddings and a Funeral	두결한장두 번의 결혼식과 한 번의 장례식 (두결한장)	Tina	Yes 24 Stage 2 (Daehakro DCF Daemyung Culture Factory, Building 2, Lifeway Hall)	September 27, 2014 – November 30, 2014	
2014–2015	Chemistry Story	케미스토리	Tiger	Daehakro Freedom Theater	October 28, 2014 – January 31, 2015	
2015	Log Number	로기수	Bae Cheol-sik	YES24 Stage 1	March 12 – May 31, 2015	
2020	Let Me Fly	렛미플라이	Old Man Nam-won	Wooran Cultural Foundation	July 5 – 7	
2022	Let Me Fly	렛미플라이	Old Man Nam-won	Yes24 Stage1	Mar 22–Jun 19	

=== Theater ===
List of Stage Play(s)
Year	Title		Role	Theater	Date	Ref.
Year	English	Korean	Role	Theater	Date	Ref.
2008	When I was The Prettiest	내가 가장 예뻤을 때	Sang-woo	Hansung Art Hall 2	Mar 13–Jun 15	
2009	Bar	술집	Multi-role	Daehangno Small Theater Festival	Feb 10–Mar 29	
2010	The Bar - Hamlet of No Return	술집 - 돌아오지 않는 햄릿	Multi-role	Guro Art Valley Arts Theater	Nov 25–27	
2013	Me and Grandpa	나와 할아버지 - 고양	Jun-hee	Daehangno Information Theater	Jul 11–Aug 04	
2013–2014	Whimsical Romance	발칙한 로맨스	Gu Bong-pil	Art One Theater Hall 3	Oct 11–Jan 12	
2014	Me and Grandpa	나와 할아버지 - 고양	Jun-hee	Art One Theater Hall 3	Feb 2–April 20	
2014	Judo Boy	유도소년	Joseph	Art One Theater Hall 3	Apr 26–Jul 13	
2014	Autumn Fireflies	가을 반딧불이	Tamotsu	Seoul Arts Center Jayu Small Theater	Jun 19-Jul 20	
2014	Shall We Go to Our Karaoke and Talk	우리 노래방가서 얘기 좀 할까	Karaoke Owner	Dongsoong Art Center Small Theater	August 9 – October 19, 2014	
2014	Shall We Go to Our Karaoke and Talk; Talk Concert	우리 노래방가서 얘기 좀 할까 토크 콘서트	Karaoke Owner	Dongsoong Art Center Small Theater	October 6, 2014	
2014	Shall We Go to Our Karaoke and Talk	우리 노래방가서 얘기 좀 할까	Karaoke Owner	Gyeonggi Arts Center Small Theater, Suwon	December 24 – December 25, 2014	
2015	Judo Boy	유도소년	Joseph	ArtOne Theater 3	February 7 – May 3, 2015	
2015	Me and Grandpa	나와 할아버지 - 고양	Jun-hee	Yegreen Theater	May 5—Aug 02	
2015	Judo Boy	유도소년	Joseph	Ansan Culture & Arts Center Dalmaeji Theater	May 21 – May 24, 2015	
2015	Hot Summer	뜨거운 여름	Jae-hee	Daehakro Jayu Theater	August 11 – November 1, 2015	
2015	Judo Boy	유도소년	Joseph	Osan Cultural Arts Center Grand Theater	October 2 – October 3, 2015	
2015	Judo Boy	유도소년	Joseph	Daegu Bongsan Cultural Center Grand Theater (Gaon Hall)	October 9 – October 10, 2015	
2015	Judo Boy	유도소년	Joseph	Uijeongbu Arts Center Small Theater	October 23 – October 24, 2015	
2016	Almost Maine	올모스트 메인	East, Lendall, Chad, Dave	Sangmyung Art Hall 1	Jan 08–Jul 3	
2016	Me and Grandpa	나와 할아버지 - 고양	Jun-hee	Gangdong Art Center Small Theater Dream	June 9—11	
2017	New Humanity's 100% Debate	신인류의 백분토론 - 고양	Yuk Geun-Cheol	Arko Arts Theater Small Theater	Feb 10–26	
2017	Judo Boy	유도소년	Joseph	Yes 24 Stage 3	Mar 04–May 14	
2018	Me and Grandpa	나와 할아버지 - 고양	Jun-hee	Guri Art Hall Canola Flower Small Theater	Feb 24	
2019	Hot Summer	뜨거운 여름	Jae-hee	Yes24 Stage 3	May 17–Jun 30	
2019–2020	Memory in Dream	메모리 인 드림	Eden	Haeoreum Arts Theater	Nov 08–Jan 19	
2020	Shall We Go to Our Karaoke and Talk	우리 노래방가서 얘기 좀 할까	Hee-jun	Seogyeong University Performing Arts Center SKON1 Hall	February 8 – March 8, 2020	
2021	Lungs	연극열전8 - 렁스	male	Art One Theater Hall 2	June 26-Sep 05	
2022	Even Then, Today	그때도 오늘	Male 1	Seokyeong University Performing Art	Jan 08–Feb 20	
2022	Even Then, Today	그때도 오늘	Male 1	Sejong Arts Center	Jun 11–12	
2022	Even Then, Today	그때도 오늘	Male 1	Bupyeong Art Center Dalnuri Theater	Jul 08–09	
2022	Even Then, Today	그때도 오늘	Male 1	Busan Cultural Center Middle Theater	Sep 23–24	
2023	Café Juenes	카페 쥬에네스	Amakusa Aki	TOM Hall 2 in Daehangno	Sep 25 – Nov 26	
2024	Even Then, Today	그때도 오늘	Male 1	Seogyeong University Performing Arts Center SKON2 Hall	March 15 – May 26, 2024	

== Awards and nominations ==
Award(s) and Nomination(s) received by Oh
Award ceremony	Year	Category	Work	Result	Ref.
2023 SBS Drama Awards	2023	Best Supporting Actor in a Miniseries Genre/Fantasy Drama	The First Responders	Nominated	
