= Are You Human? =

2018 South Korean television series

- Promotional poster
- Hangul: 너도 인간이니?
- Lit.: Are You Human Too?
- RR: Neodo inganini?
- MR: Nŏdo in'ganini?
- Genre: Science fiction; Romance; Politics; Mystery
- Created by: KBS Drama Production
- Written by: Jo Jung-joo
- Directed by: Cha Young-hoon
- Starring: Seo Kang-joon; Gong Seung-yeon
- Country of origin: South Korea
- Original language: Korean
- No. of episodes: 36 (Note: Repackaged with two 35-minute episodes shown each night from this drama onwards in accordance with MBC and SBS drama serial time-slots. The series was originally scheduled to air for 18 episodes.)

Production
- Executive producer: Lee Jae-gil
- Production locations: Seoul, South Korea, Karlovy Vary, Czech Republic
- Running time: 35 minutes
- Production company: KBS Media
- Budget: ₩10 billion

Original release
- Network: KBS2
- Release: June 4 – August 7, 2018

Are You Human? (Korean: 너도 인간이니?; RR: Neodo inganini?) is a 2018 South Korean television series starring Seo Kang-joon and Gong Seung-yeon. It aired on KBS2's Mondays and Tuesdays at 22:00 (KST), from June 4 to August 7, 2018.

== Synopsis ==
Oh Laura, a renowned scientist, was forced to part with her young son, Nam Shin. To cope with her loss, over the years, she builds various AI robots modelled after him, naming them Nam Shin I, II and III. Decades later, after surviving an attempt on his life, Nam Shin slips into a coma. To protect his position as the heir to a chaebol, Laura sends Nam Shin III to take his place and fulfil his duties.

Kang So-bong was a member of Nam Shin's security detail until she was dismissed in disgrace. She becomes Nam Shin III's bodyguard, determined to get to the bottom of his strange comments and behaviour. However, she gets more than what she'd bargained for when she starts falling for him - and has to keep him safe from the very people who'd tried to murder Nam Shin.

== Cast ==
=== Main ===
- Seo Kang-joon as Nam Shin / Nam Shin III
  - Lee Joo-chan as teenage Nam Shin / Nam Shin II
  - Oh Han-kyul as child Nam Shin / Nam Shin I

A third generation heir who falls into coma after an unexpected accident. His mother Oh Laura, an authority on brain science and artificial intelligence leads the creation of an android, Nam Shin III, in a bid to maintain his position as heir to a chaebol conglomerate.

- Gong Seung-yeon as Kang So-bong

A former MMA fighter who had to quit due to an injury from competition, and then worked as a bodyguard. She comes to protect Nam Shin III, and although she does it out of selfish motive at first, she later comes to care for him genuinely.

- Lee Joon-hyuk as Ji Young-hoon

Nam Shin's secretary and only friend and a guardian. A pragmatic and realistic person. His background is tied to Nam Shin's company, PK Group, in that he was raised in an orphanage that the conglomerate funded, and went on to become a top student at a university also backed by PK Group.

- Park Hwan-hee as Seo Ye-na

Nam Shin's fiancée. Her father is a high-level director at PK Group and Nam Shin's opponent.

- Kim Sung-ryung as Laura Oh

Nam Shin's mother and an expert in the field of intelligence. Described as intelligent and intensely focused, she's also the lead researcher working on developing the android with a secret team of top scientists.

- Yu Oh-seong as Seo Jong-gil

Nam Shin's opponent, Seo Ye-na's father. A high-level director of PK group who wants to become the head of the company.

- Park Yeong-gyu as Nam Gun-ho

Nam Shin's grandfather. CEO of PK group. A sly and cunning man.

=== Supporting ===
- Choi Deok-moon as David
- Kim Hye-eun as Nam Ho-yeon
- Seo Eun-yool as No Hee-dong
- Kim Won-hae as Kang Jae-sik
- Kim Hyun-sook as Reporter Jo
- Oh Hee-joon as Jo In-tae
- Cha Yub as Robo Cop
- Chae Dong-hyun as Ko Chang-jo
- Cha In-ha as Hwang Ji-yong
- Cho Jae-ryong as Secretary Park
- Choi Byung-mo as Choi Sang-guk
- Oh Eui-shik as Cha Hyun-joon
- Oh Han-kyul as young Nam Shin/A.I. robot Nam Shin I
- Lee Joo-chan as teen Nam Shin/A.I. robot Nam Shin II
- Park Ah-sung as Anchor
- Oh Joo-eun as Team Leader

=== Special appearances ===
- Heo Young-ji (Ep. 1)
- Kim Seung-soo as Nam Jung-woo, Nam Shin's father

== Production ==
- The series is written by Jo Jung-joo (The Princess' Man, 2011) and directed by Cha Young-hoon (Uncontrollably Fond, 2016).
- The first script reading was held in June 2017 at KBS Annex in Yeouido, Seoul.
- Filming began in late June 2017 and wrapped up on November 29, 2017. Some parts of the filming took place in Czech Republic.
- The entire series production has taken two years to complete which had cost a total of 10 billion won (US$9.23 million).
- Go A-ra was offered the role of the female lead but declined.
- The drama was screened at the Cannes International Series Festival prior to its premiere.

== Original soundtrack ==
Soundtrack album by Various artists
- Genre: Soundtrack
- Language: Korean
- Labels: OU Entertainment; NHN Bugs
- Producer: Gaemi

=== Part 1 ===
Released on June 4, 2018
No.	Title	Lyrics	Music	Artist	Length
1.	"Is This Love?(" (사랑인걸까?)	17HOLIC, Choi Ha-na, Ravi	Dino Seo	VIXX	3:16
2.	"Is This Love?(" (Inst.)		Dino Seo		3:16
Total length:					6:32

=== Part 2 ===
Released on June 12, 2018
No.	Title	Lyrics	Music	Artist	Length
1.	"LOVE"	Heo Seong-jin, Gaemi, Changjo	Gaemi, Heo Seong-jin	Lyn, Hanhae	3:54
2.	"LOVE" (Inst.)		Gaemi, Heo Seong-jin		3:54
Total length:					7:48

=== Part 3 ===
Released on June 25, 2018
No.	Title	Lyrics	Music	Artist	Length
1.	"Who Are You?" (너, 누구니?)	Go Dong-geun, Red Haired Anne	Go Dong-geun, Red Haired Anne	Red Haired Anne	3:45
2.	"The Longing Dance"	Im Ji-eun	Gaemi	Im Ji-eun	3:20
3.	"Who Are You?" (Inst.)		Go Dong-geun, Red Haired Anne		3:45
Total length:					10:50

=== Part 4 ===
Released on July 3, 2018
No.	Title	Lyrics	Music	Artist	Length
1.	"Heart"	Gaemi, Yoda	Gaemi, Kim Se-jin	2BiC	3:42
2.	"Heart" (Inst.)		Gaemi, Kim Se-jin		3:42
Total length:					7:24

=== Part 5 ===
Released on July 9, 2018
No.	Title	Lyrics	Music	Artist	Length
1.	"Tell Me" (말해줘요)	Jin Hyo-jeong	Jin Hyo-jeong	Kim Na-young	3:25
2.	"Tell Me" (Inst.)		Jin Hyo-jeong		3:25
Total length:					6:50

=== Part 6 ===
Released on July 16, 2018
No.	Title	Lyrics	Music	Artist	Length
1.	"For The First Time"	Gaemi, Tae Yoon-mi	Gaemi	GB9	3:36
2.	"For The First Time" (Inst.)		Gaemi		3:36
Total length:					7:12

=== Part 7 ===
Released on July 23, 2018
No.	Title	Lyrics	Music	Artist	Length
1.	"In Your Eyes (Drama Ver.)" (눈을 맞추면 (Drama Ver.))	Heo Sung-jin, Lee So-won, Yezi	Gaemi, Heo Sung-jin, Hong Sung-joon	Yongzoo, Yezi	3:45
2.	"Milagro"	Im Ji-eun	Gaemi	Im Ji-eun	2:42
3.	"In Your Eyes (Drama Ver.)" (Inst.)		Gaemi, Heo Sung-jin, Hong Sung-joon		3:45
Total length:					10:12

=== Part 8 ===
Released on July 30, 2018
No.	Title	Lyrics	Music	Artist	Length
1.	"Why Do We"	DMEANOR, HILO	HILO, DMEANOR, Eco Bridge, Aron Kim	DMEANOR	4:15
2.	"Why Do We (English Ver.)"	HILO	HILO, DMEANOR, Eco Bridge, Aron Kim	DMEANOR	4:15
3.	"Why Do We" (Inst.)		HILO, DMEANOR, Eco Bridge, Aron Kim		4:15
Total length:					12:45

=== Part 9 ===
Released on August 7, 2018
No.	Title	Lyrics	Music	Artist	Length
1.	"You Are My Love"	Gaemi, Kim Se-jin	Gaemi, Kim Se-jin	Seo Kang-joon	3:35
2.	"You Are My Love" (Inst.)		Gaemi, Kim Se-jin		3:35
Total length:					7:10

Disc 2:
No.	Title	Artist	Length
1.	"R U Human (Opening Title)"	Gae Mi	2:39
2.	"I'm Human (C.D only)"	Gae Mi	4:18
3.	"Beyond"	Gae Mi	2:40
4.	"Break down"	Gae Mi	3:10
5.	"For the first time (orchestra ver.)"	Gae Mi	2:43
6.	"A.I To Human"	Lee Geon Young	4:05
7.	"R U Sure?"	Lee Geon Young	2:56
8.	"Peaceful"	Lee Geon Young	3:46
9.	"A.I"	Park Yoon Seo	3:31
10.	"Signal"	Park Yoon Seo	3:11
11.	"Close"	Park Yoon Seo	2:56
12.	"Conspiracy"	Park Jung Hwan	3:06
13.	"Bulgar Man"	Park Jung Hwan	2:38
14.	"Fighter"	Park Jung Hwan	3:14
15.	"I Know You"	Park Jung Hwan	2:44
16.	"Truth"	Park Mi Seon	2:53
17.	"Impossible"	Lee Seong Gu	2:09
18.	"Don't Believe"	Lee Seong Gu	2:56
19.	"Heart Break"	Lee Seong Gu	3:09
20.	"Carry On"	Se Jin Kim	2:55
21.	"LoL"	Hye Sung Jin	2:27

== Ratings ==
- In this table, the blue numbers represent the lowest ratings and the red numbers represent the highest ratings.
- NR denotes that the drama did not rank in the top 20 daily programs on that date.

Ep.	Original broadcast date	Average audience share			
Ep.	Original broadcast date	TNmS		AGB Nielsen	
Ep.	Original broadcast date	Nationwide	Seoul	Nationwide	Seoul
1	June 4, 2018	6.1%	6.3%	5.2% (NR)	5.4% (NR)
2	June 4, 2018	6.9%	7.2%	5.9% (NR)	6.1% (NR)
3	June 5, 2018	5.4%	5.6%	5.0% (NR)	5.2% (NR)
4	June 5, 2018	5.9%	6.1%	5.3% (NR)	5.5% (NR)
5	June 11, 2018	5.5%	5.7%	5.4% (NR)	5.6% (NR)
6	June 11, 2018	7.0%	7.2%	6.3% (NR)	6.5% (NR)
7	June 12, 2018	8.0%	8.3%	7.7% (6th)	7.4% (4th)
8	June 12, 2018	9.6%	9.7%	9.9% (3rd)	9.8% (2nd)
9	June 18, 2018 (Note: Aired later than usual due to the coverage of the 2018 FIFA World Cup Group F match between South Korea and Sweden.)	5.2%	5.4%	5.5% (19th)	5.7% (NR)
10	June 18, 2018	5.2%	5.5%	5.0% (NR)	5.3% (NR)
11	June 25, 2018 (Note: No episodes were aired June 19 due to the coverage of the 2018 FIFA World Cup Group H match between Colombia and Japan.)	5.0%	5.2%	4.6% (NR)	4.8% (NR)
12	June 25, 2018	5.7%	5.9%	5.3% (NR)	5.4% (NR)
13	July 3, 2018 (Note: No episodes were aired June 26 due to the coverage of the 2018 FIFA World Cup Group C match between Denmark and France, and on July 2 due to coverage of the 2018 FIFA World Cup match between Brazil and Mexico. Four episodes were aired back-to-back on July 3.)	5.2%	5.4%	4.8% (NR)	5.0% (NR)
14	July 3, 2018	6.4%	6.8%	5.9% (NR)	6.1% (NR)
15	July 3, 2018	5.2%	5.3%	4.8% (NR)	4.9% (NR)
16	July 3, 2018	4.6%	4.8%	4.2% (NR)	4.4% (NR)
17	July 9, 2018	4.7%	4.9%	4.3% (NR)	4.4% (NR)
18	July 9, 2018	5.5%	5.7%	5.2% (NR)	5.5% (NR)
19	July 10, 2018	5.0%	5.3%	4.6% (NR)	4.8% (NR)
20	July 10, 2018	5.9%	6.0%	5.5% (NR)	5.6% (NR)
21	July 16, 2018	4.8%	4.9%	4.4% (NR)	4.5% (NR)
22	July 16, 2018	5.5%	5.6%	5.1% (NR)	5.3% (NR)
23	July 17, 2018	4.7%	4.8%	4.4% (NR)	4.7% (NR)
24	July 17, 2018	5.8%	6.1%	5.4% (19th)	5.2% (NR)
25	July 23, 2018	5.3%	5.1%	4.6% (NR)	4.4% (NR)
26	July 23, 2018	6.2%	5.9%	5.6% (19th)	5.5% (NR)
27	July 24, 2018	6.4%	6.2%	5.0% (20th)	4.8% (NR)
28	July 24, 2018	7.7%	7.4%	6.0% (17th)	5.3% (20th)
29	July 30, 2018	5.1%	4.5%	4.7% (NR)	4.3% (NR)
30	July 30, 2018	5.7%	5.4%	5.9% (18th)	5.5% (NR)
31	July 31, 2018	5.2%	4.8%	5.2% (NR)	4.9% (NR)
32	July 31, 2018	6.0%	5.5%	6.0% (13th)	5.7% (18th)
33	August 6, 2018	6.8%	6.5%	5.0% (NR)	4.7% (NR)
34	August 6, 2018	6.2%	5.9%	5.3% (NR)	5.1% (NR)
35	August 7, 2018	6.3%	6.4%	6.5% (13th)	6.7% (10th)
36	August 7, 2018	7.6%	7.7%	7.8% (7th)	7.9% (6th)
Average		5.9%	6.0%	5.5%	5.5%

== Awards and nominations ==
Year	Award	Category	Recipient	Result	Ref.
2018	11th Korea Drama Awards	Excellence Award, Actor	Seo Kang-joon	Nominated	
2018	32nd KBS Drama Awards	Excellence Award, Actor in a Mid-length Drama	Seo Kang-joon	Won	
2018	32nd KBS Drama Awards	Excellence Award, Actor in a Mid-length Drama	Lee Joon-hyuk	Nominated	
2018	32nd KBS Drama Awards	Excellence Award, Actress in a Mid-length Drama	Gong Seung-yeon	Nominated	
2018	32nd KBS Drama Awards	Best Supporting Actor	Yu Oh-seong	Nominated	
2018	32nd KBS Drama Awards	Best Supporting Actor	Kim Won-hae	Won	
2018	32nd KBS Drama Awards	Best Supporting Actress	Kim Sung-ryung	Nominated	
2018	32nd KBS Drama Awards	Best Supporting Actress	Kim Hyun-sook	Won	
2018	32nd KBS Drama Awards	Best Couple	Seo Kang-joon & Gong Seung-yeon	Won	
