= Grid (South Korean TV series) =

2022 South Korean television series

- Promotional poster
- Genre: Thriller; Science fiction
- Written by: Lee Soo-Yeon
- Directed by: Khan Lee; Park Cheol-hwan; Kwon Hyuk-chan
- Starring: Seo Kang-joon; Kim Ah-joong; Kim Mu-yeol; Kim Sung-kyun; Lee Si-young
- Music by: Kim Joon-seok (Movie Closer)
- Country of origin: South Korea
- Original language: Korean
- No. of episodes: 10

Production
- Executive producers: Bae Jeong-hoon; Kim Seong-hee; Kim Shin-ah
- Producers: Min Hyun-il; Lee Seong-jin
- Production companies: Ace Factory; Arc Media

Original release
- Network: Disney+ (International); Hulu (United States)
- Release: February 16 – April 20, 2022

Grid (Korean: 그리드) is a South Korean television series starring Seo Kang-joon, Kim Ah-joong, Kim Mu-yeol, Kim Sung-kyun, and Lee Si-young. It premiered on Disney+ on February 16, 2022 for Asia-Pacific subscribers.

== Synopsis ==
A mystery tracking thriller of the General Affairs Bureau and detectives digging into the truth about the mysterious existence that saved mankind in crisis.

== Cast ==
=== Main ===
- Seo Kang-joon as Kim Sae-ha / Kwon Sae-ha, an employee of the Grid Bureau
  - Choi Seung-hoon as young Sae-ha
- Kim Ah-joong as Jung Sae-byeok, a detective
- Kim Mu-yeol as Song Eo-jin, an employee of the Grid Bureau
- Kim Sung-kyun as Kim Ma-nok / Lee Si-won, a murderer
- Lee Si-young as the ghost the founder of the Grid

=== Supporting ===
- Jang So-yeon as Choi Sun-wool, the Deputy Director of the Grid Bureau
- Song Sang-eun as Chae Jong-i, an employee of the Grid Bureau
- Lee Kyu-hoe as Han Wi-han, the chief security officer of the Grid Bureau
- Jung Won-joong as the minister of Ministry of Commerce Industry and Energy
- Kim Hyung-mook as Jo Heung-sik, the Director of the Grid Bureau
- Kwon Hyuk as a department heads of the Grid Bureau
- Heo Joon-suk as Major Im Ji-woo, the captain of the Special Squad of the Grid Bureau
- Kong Sang-a as Kim Min-seon, Sae-ha's mother
- Jo Hee-bong as Ko Han-seung, Sae-byeok's superior
- Cha Sun-woo as Jung Him-chan, Sae-byeok's younger brother
- Lee Seung-cheol as Lee Jang-hyuk, Si-won's foster father who killed by the ghost

=== Special appearance ===
- Shim Wan-joon as Songje Police Station Detective
- Lee Hae-young as Kwon Soo-geun, Sae-ha's father, killed by the ghost
  - Seo Kang-joon as younger Soo-geun
- Kim Kwak-kyung-hee as Subway cleaner
- Yoo Jae-myung as Unknown person
- Ki Hong Lee as Man from the future

== Production ==
The series is directed by Khan Lee, director of films such as Desert Dream (2007), and written by Lee Soo-eun, who wrote the series Life (2018) and the famous legal drama Stranger. It is produced by Ace Factory, Arc Media, and an original series for the Disney Streaming platform including Disney+'s Star Hub and Hulu.
