= Seo Kang-joon =

South Korean actor (born 1993)

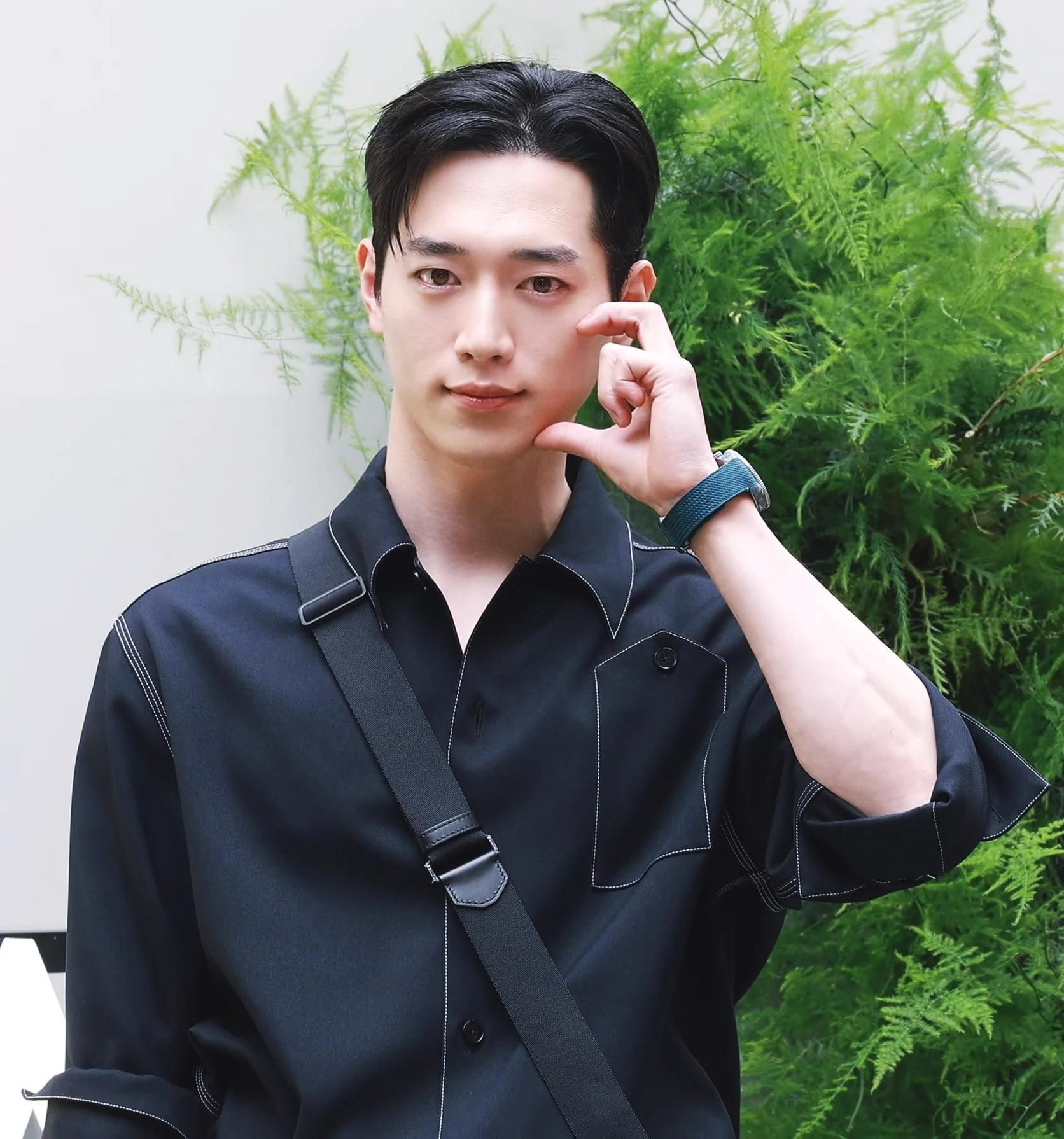
- Seo in May 2025
- Born: Lee Seung-hwan; October 12, 1993 (age 33); Gunpo, South Korea
- Education: Dong Seoul University (Performing Arts)
- Occupations: Actor; singer
- Years active: 2012–present
- Agent: Man of Creation
- Musical career
- Instrument: Piano
- Label: Fantagio
- Formerly of: 5urprise

Korean name
- Hangul: 이승환
- Hanja: 李承桓
- RR: I Seunghwan
- MR: I Sŭnghwan

Stage name
- Hangul: 서강준
- RR: Seo Gangjun
- MR: Sŏ Kangjun

Signature
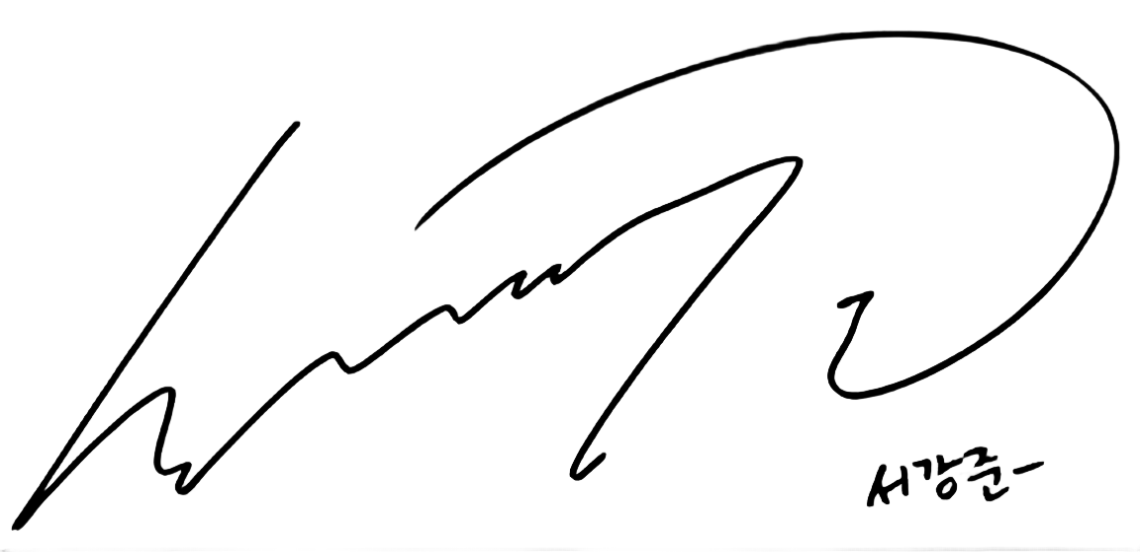

Lee Seung-hwan (Korean: 이승환; born October 12, 1993), known professionally as Seo Kang-joon (서강준), is a South Korean actor and former singer, who was a member of the group 5urprise. He gained recognition with his role in the television series Cheese in the Trap (2016) and has since starred in Are You Human? (2018), Watcher (2019), When The Weather Is Fine (2020), Grid (2022), and Undercover High School (2025).

== Early life and education ==
Seo Kang-joon was born Lee Seung-hwan in Gunpo, South Korea. In the second year of secondary school, Seo went to study abroad in Malaysia for one year and seven months and returned to Korea in the first year of high school. After his debut, he enrolled at the Faculty of Performing Arts of Dong Seoul College. Seo worked part-time as a model before his debut. After passing the audition for Actor's League, a program with the aim of searching for new actors organized by Fantagio, Seo underwent training before debuting in the group 5urprise.

== Career ==
=== 2012–2016: Beginnings and rising popularity ===
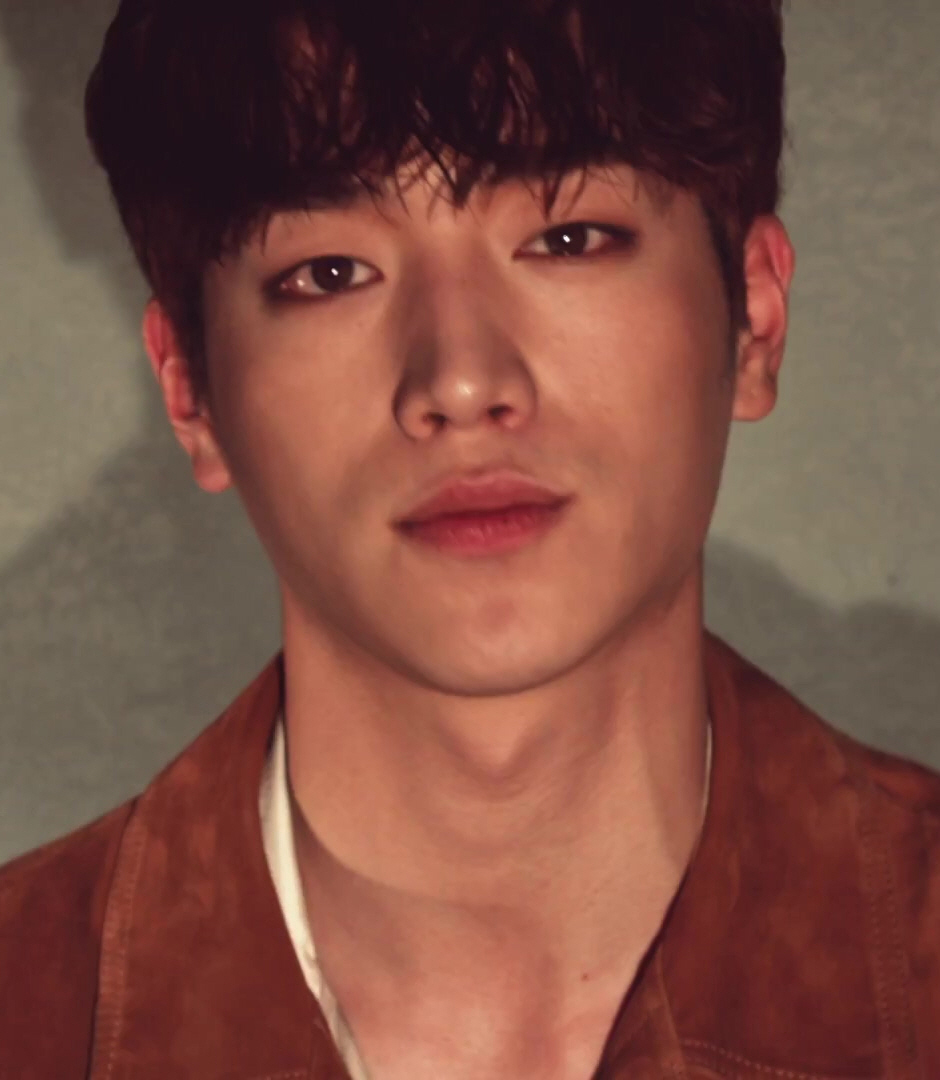
Seo for Marie Claire Korea in 2015

Seo took on bit parts in various television series, before making his acting debut as with a supporting role in SBS' drama The Suspicious Housekeeper.

His first major role was in the 2014 romantic comedy series Cunning Single Lady, for which he won the Best New Actor award at the 7th Korea Drama Awards.

He has then appeared in television dramas What Happens to My Family? (2014–2015), Splendid Politics (2015), and To Be Continued (2015), as well as films My Love, My Bride (2014) and Summer Snow (2015).

In 2014, Seo joined the SBS variety show Roommate as a cast member. He also appeared on Law of the Jungle as a guest.

Seo's breakout role came in 2016 as a talented pianist in the college romance drama Cheese in the Trap. The same year, he starred in his first leading role in tvN drama Entourage, the Korean remake of the American television series of the same name.

=== 2018–present: Leading roles ===
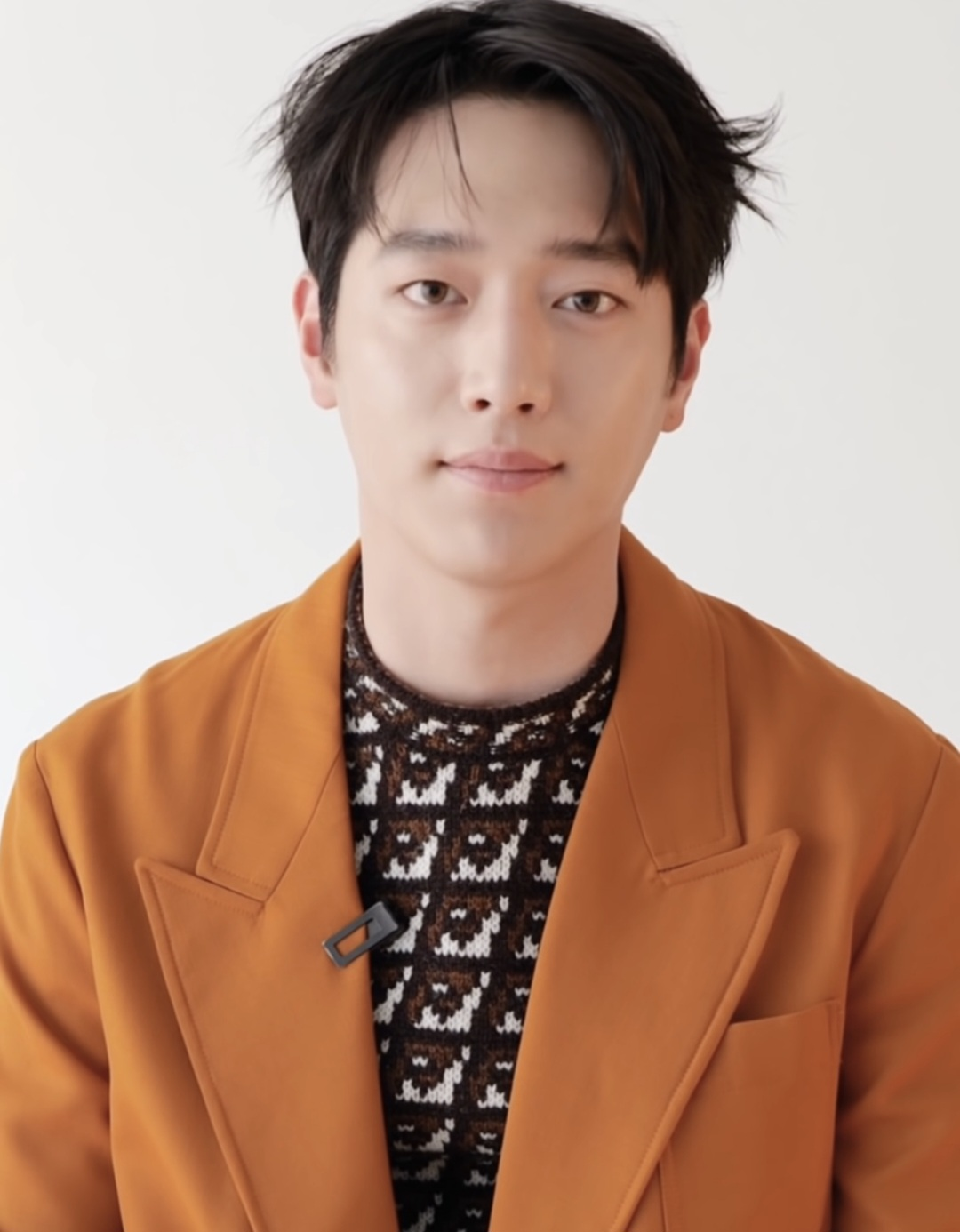
Seo in 2022

In 2018, Seo starred in KBS's science fiction drama Are You Human? where he played double roles as a wealthy heir and robot. The same year, he starred in romance comedy drama The Third Charm.

In 2019, Seo starred in OCN's thriller drama Watcher as a policeman. He was cast in the JTBC romance drama When the Weather Is Fine, which aired in the first half of 2020.

In 2022, Seo starred in Disney+ (Star) thriller drama Grid as an employee of the Grid Bureau.

In 2024, Seo was cast in the MBC action comedy Undercover High School, which aired in the first half of 2025.

== Personal life ==
=== Military service ===
On November 8, 2021, it was reported that Seo would enlist in the military on November 23, 2021. Later the same day, Seo's agency confirmed that he would enlist in the military on November 23, without revealing his location. Seo received the division commander's commendation for excellent performance in basic military training. Seo was discharged from military service on May 22, 2023 after serving as an active duty soldier for 18 months.

== Filmography ==
Key
†	Denotes films that have not yet been released

=== Film ===
Year	Title	Role	Notes	Ref.
2014	My Love, My Bride	Joon-soo		
2015	The Beauty Inside	Kim Woo-jin	Cameo	
2015	Summer Snow	Han Sang-gyu		
2021	A Year-End Medley	Lee Kang		

=== Television series ===
Year	Title	Role	Notes	Ref.
2012	To the Beautiful You	Student	Bit part (ep. 3, 7)	
2013	Good Doctor	Disorderly student	Bit part (ep. 12)	
2013	The Suspicious Housekeeper	Choi Soo-hyuk		
2013	Haneuljae's Murder	Yoon-ha	KBS Drama Special	
2014	Cunning Single Lady	Gook Seung-hyun	Main role	
2014	What Happens to My Family?	Yoon Eun-ho		
2015	Splendid Politics	Hong Joo-won		
2016	Cheese in the Trap	Baek In-ho		
2016	Entertainer	Lee Sang-won	Cameo (ep. 7–8)	
2016	Entourage	Cha Young-bin		
2018	Are You Human?	Nam Shin / Nam Shin III		
2018	The Third Charm	Oh Joon-young		
2019	Watcher	Kim Young-goon		
2020	When the Weather Is Fine	Im Eun-seob		
2022	Grid	Kim Sae-ha / Kwon Sae-ha / young Kwon Soo-geun		
2025	Undercover High School	Jeong Hae-seong / Jeong Si-hyun		
2026	Boyfriend on Demand	Seo Eun-ho	5 episodes	
2026	A Love Other Than Yours	Namgoong Ho	Main role	

=== Web series ===
Year	Title	Role	Notes	Ref.
2013	After School: Lucky or Not	Seo Kang-joon		
2014	The Best Future	Choi Go		
2015	To Be Continued	Ah-rin's older brother	Cameo	
2017	Idol Fever	Do-yun's older brother	Cameo	
2021	Love Refresh	Seo Nam-joo		

=== Television shows ===
Year	Title	Role	Notes	Ref.
2014–2015	Roommate	Cast member	Seasons 1–2	
2016	Law of the Jungle in Tonga	Cast member		

== Discography ==
=== Soundtrack appearances ===
Year	Song title	Album	Notes	Ref.
2018	"You Are My Love"	Are You Human? OST		

== Accolades ==
=== Awards and nominations ===
Name of the award ceremony, year presented, category, work(s) nominated / nominee(s) of the award, and the result of the nomination
Award ceremony	Year	Category	Work(s) / Nominee(s)	Result	Ref.
Asia Artist Awards	2016	Best Entertainer Award, Actor	Seo Kang-joon	Won	
Asia Artist Awards	2017	Best Icon Award, Actor	Seo Kang-joon	Won	
Asia Artist Awards	2026	Popularity Award – Actor	Seo Kang-joon	Pending	
Korea Drama Awards	2014	Best New Actor	Cunning Single Lady	Won	
Korea Drama Awards	2015	Excellence Award, Actor	Splendid Politics	Nominated	
Korea Drama Awards	2015	Hot Star Award	Splendid Politics	Won	
Korea Drama Awards	2018	Excellence Award, Actor	Are You Human?	Nominated	
KBS Drama Awards	2014	Best New Actor	What Happens to My Family?	Nominated	
KBS Drama Awards	2018	Excellence Award, Actor in a Mid-length Drama	Are You Human?	Won	
KBS Drama Awards	2018	Best Couple	Seo Kang-joon (with Gong Seung-yeon); Are You Human?	Won	
MBC Drama Awards	2014	Best New Actor	Cunning Single Lady	Nominated	
MBC Drama Awards	2025	Grand Prize (Daesang) (Note: A Daesang (Korean: 대상), which translates to "Grand Prize", is the highest honor given out at South Korean award ceremonies.)	Undercover High School	Won	
SBS Entertainment Awards	2014	Best Male Newcomer	Roommate	Nominated	
Seoul International Youth Film Festival	2014	Best New Actor	Cunning Single Lady	Nominated	
tvN10 Awards	2016	Made in tvN, Actor in Drama	Cheese in the Trap	Nominated	

=== Listicles ===
Name of publisher, year listed, name of listicle, and placement
Publisher	Year	Listicle	Placement	Ref.
Korean Film Council	2021	Korean Actors 200 (Note: Introduces 200 actors that best represent the present and future of Korean cinema to the people in the film industry all over the world.)	Included	
