= Suspicious Partner =

2017 South Korean television series

- Promotional poster
- Also known as: Love in Trouble; Destiny Lovers; Beware of This Woman; Be Careful of This Woman; Watch Out for This Woman; Suspicious Romance
- Hangul: 수상한 파트너
- RR: Susanghan pateuneo
- MR: Susanghan p'at'ŭnŏ
- Genre: Legal; Crime; Romantic-comedy
- Written by: Kwon Ki-young
- Directed by: Park Sun-ho
- Starring: Ji Chang-wook; Nam Ji-hyun; Choi Tae-joon; Kwon Nara
- Country of origin: South Korea
- Original language: Korean
- No. of episodes: 40 (Note: The series was originally packaged as twenty 60-minute episodes. In order to circumvent Korean laws that prevent commercial breaks in the middle of an episode, what would previously have been aired as single 60 minute episodes are now being repackaged as two 30 minute episodes, with two episodes being shown each night with a commercial break between the two. This, following a fall in ratings and eventual 2-episode cut in the preceding drama serial Saimdang, Memoir of Colors.)

Production
- Executive producer: Park Young-soo
- Camera setup: Single-camera
- Running time: 30 mins
- Production company: The Story Works

Original release
- Network: SBS
- Release: May 10 – July 13, 2017

Suspicious Partner (Korean: 수상한 파트너; RR: Susanghan pateuneo) is a 2017 South Korean television series starring Ji Chang-wook and Nam Ji-hyun, with Choi Tae-joon and Kwon Nara. It aired on Seoul Broadcasting System from May 10 to July 13, 2017, at 22:00 (KST) on Wednesdays and Thursdays for 20 episodes.

While the show, during some weeks, managed to outperform its competitor in some categories, such as the 20-49 year old demographic, as well as streaming, popularity and brand reputation charts, it enjoyed modest viewership, while its competitor topped the ratings in its time slot.

== Synopsis ==
The series is about Noh Ji-wook (Ji Chang-wook), a prosecutor, and Eun Bong-hee (Nam Ji-hyun), a prosecutor trainee. When a murderer strikes, Bong-hee suddenly finds herself as a suspect, and Noh Ji-wook then changes jobs to become a private attorney due to circumstances. The two work together on the case, finding out how deeply connected they are by their past.

== Cast ==
=== Main ===
- Ji Chang-wook as Noh Ji-wook (31 years old)
  - Oh Han-gyeol and Son Sang-yeon as young Ji-wook

A top-performing, tsundere, brainy prosecutor with the highest indictment success rate in the Seoul District Prosecutors' Office who ends up switching professions to a private attorney in the aftermath of defending Eun Bong-hee. He became a prosecutor to fulfill the unfinished dream of his father, who passed away while fighting crime. He has little interest in promotions or honor; his sole dream is to serve as an active prosecutor until retirement and then hang up his robe. He was scarred by an event in his childhood involving his parents. He then went through a traumatic betrayal involving his former best friend and his ex girlfriend. Bong-hee falls for him, though he does not initially return her feelings. He eventually does and tries to pursue her, however he starts to be swayed again by the fact that Bong-hee's father could have been the arsonist who set the fire in which his parents died.

- Nam Ji-hyun as Eun Bong-hee (27 years old)
  - Choi Myung-bin as young Bong-hee

A prosecutor trainee at Ji-wook's office, later lawyer who was a Taekwondo athlete in her youth. One day, she becomes a murder suspect as her ex-boyfriend's dead body was found in her house in which she had no alibi, causing District Attorney Jang Moo-young to keep coming after her and blame her for his son's death. She eventually falls for Ji-wook after he defended her. He eventually pursues her as he realizes his feelings for her.

- Choi Tae-joon as Ji Eun-hyuk (31 years old)
  - Kwon Bin and Moon Woo-jin as young Eun-hyuk

A lawyer, once best friends with Ji-wook, who is now despised by him because he had an affair with Yoo-jung.

- Kwon Nara as Cha Yoo-jung (31 years old)
  - Ryu Han-bi as young Yoo-jung

A prosecutor, who is Noh Ji-wook's childhood friend and ex-girlfriend.

=== Supporting ===
==== People around Noh Ji-wook ====
- Lee Deok-hwa as Byun Young-hee (62)

Ji-wook's adoptive father, who was good friend of Jo-Wook’s father and is representative of a big law firm, Byun & Partners, who later joins Ji-wook's newly opened firm. He was a classmate with Chief Prosecutor Jang Mu-young in the Judicial Research and Training Institute, but they are also sworn enemies.

- Nam Gi-ae as Hong Bok-ja (58)

Ji-wook's adoptive mom, who is a best friend of Ji-wook's mother and owner of a pizza shop. She is also the archenemy of Young-soon, Bong-hee's mother.

- Jang Hyuk-jin as Chief Bang Eun-ho (46)

Ji-wook's prosecution investigation officer-turned-lawyer's paralegal, who he serves with utmost respect, but also scolds him like a strict older brother when it's necessary. He considers himself to be the 'hen mother' of the group.

- Jo Seung-yeon as Noh Young-seok (37)

Ji-wook's late father, who died in fire. He was righteous prosecutor who wanted to be a legal professional without a single blemish until the moment of his death. He is the person Ji-wook respected the most and the role model in life he wants to emulate.

- Jin Hee Kyung as Kim Mi Yun

Ji-Wook's late mother, who died in fire

==== People around Eun Bong-hee ====
- Yoon Bok-in as Park Young-soon (56)

Bong-hee's mother, who loves her daughter and remarried after the death of her husband. An indomitable mother who raised Bong-hee while working as a sports massage therapist. She works at a massage parlor where she befriends Ji-wook's mom and later ends up working for Ji-wook's mom. The two are frequently indulge in semi-friendly banter.

- Lee Do-yeop as Eun Man-su

Bong-hee's father who died while trying to save Ji-wook and his family. He was earlier accused of murdering Ji-wook's parents until it was discovered that he was innocent.

- Hwang Chan-sung as Jang Hee-joon (28)

A prosecutor trainee, who was a son of District Attorney and Bong-hee's cheating ex-boyfriend. A descendant of a prestigious legal family for generations. He died in Bong-hee's house which pointed her as the prime suspect.

==== People at the JRTI (Judicial Research and Training Institute) ====
- Kim Ye-won as Na Ji-hae (29)

Bong-hee's classmate and fellow trainee, who was Hee-jun's lover, later became his girlfriend after Bong-hee caught them. She later became prosecutor in Yu-jeong's office and quickly becomes friends with her.

- Heo Joon-seok as Woo Hee-kyu (33)

Bong-hee's classmate and friend.

- Shim Eun-woo as Hong Cha-eun (30)

A Judicial Research and Training Institute student who is hard to grasp—warm yet cold, seemingly close yet distant.

=== Extended ===
- Kim Hong-fa as Jang Moo-young, 62

Jang Hee-joon's father and the District Attorney. They continuously persecute Ji-wook and Bong-hee by influencing the Bar Association, the Prosecutor's Office, the courts, etc. He believes in upholding the might of the prosecution even if it meant defaming common people, as shown when he falsely incriminated Bong-hee's father as the arsonist who caused the fire that killed Ji-wook's parents and also himself, releasing the gang-rapists of Park So-young after dismissing their rape charges on the bribery of the parents and forcing Ji-wook to indict and convict Bong-hee (who was actually innocent) for murdering his son. Upon discovering Hyun-soo's guilt of his son's murder, he tried to kill him unsuccessfully and this led to his downfall as he was dismissed from his post and arrested for attempted murder (and possibly his pre-existing corruption prior to his arrest).

- Dong Ha as Jung Hyun-soo

A victim who was accused of murder which has similar vibe to Bong-hee's case, but has a mysterious identity that lies in him. He was in fact a serial killer who had earlier, out of revenge, murdered five of the six gang-rapists (including the victim of a murder he was accused of and first appeared in the show for) of his high school crush Park So-young, who committed suicide after this incident. He was also the real culprit who murdered Jang Hee-joon; in fact, his real target was Bong-hee, who unknowingly witnessed him killing two of the rapists, but he ended up killing Hee-joon, who was at the wrong place at the wrong time when he tried to make amends with Bong-hee for cheating on her. Hyun-soo was eventually sentenced to life imprisonment for the murders he committed.

- Jin Ju-hyung as Go Chan-ho

A forensic investigator who went missing after being falsely incriminated for murder. He was actually one of the gang-rapists who raped Park So-young and was shown to be plagued with remorse (possibly) for the crime. He disappeared before he could meet up with Ji-wook to reveal something related to Hyun-soo, and was confirmed to be murdered by Hyun-soo when his body was discovered nearing the finale of the series. Four of his five accomplices - Lee Jae-ho, Yang Jin-woo, Kim Min-goo and Sung Jae-hyun - were earlier murdered by Hyun-soo while the final accomplice Min Young-hoon eventually surrendered and went to jail for the crime around the same time Hyun-soo was indicted the second time and finally sentenced.

- Park Gyu-young as Park So-young

A girl from Jung Hyun-soo's past who committed suicide after a tragedy which traumatized her.

- Park Ji-a as Park Seong-eun
- Kim Kyung-jin as Guy who disturbed Bong-hee while drinking (Ep. 1)
- Choi Hong as Vice-chief of Prosecutor (Ep. 1–4)
- Kim Ki-nam as Prosecutor who works with Jung Moo-young (Ep. 8)
- Seo Jin-wook as Forensic expert who testified in court (Ep. 4)
- Jo Won-hee as Judge

== Production ==
The early working titles for the drama were Beware This Woman and Suspicious Romance. The first script reading took place April 4, 2017 at SBS Ilsan Production Center in Tanhyun, South Korea.

Both lead actors Ji Chang-wook and Nam Ji-hyun starred in Warrior Baek Dong-soo in 2011.

== Original soundtrack ==
Suspicious Partner OST Album

Soundtrack album by Various artists
- Released: 2017
- Genre: Soundtrack
- Languages: Korean, English
- Labels: SBS Contents Hub; Vlending Co., Ltd.

=== Part 1 ===
No.	Title	Lyrics	Music	Artist	Length
1.	"Why You?" (너는 왜)	Nam Hye-seung; Park Sang-hee	Nam Hye-seung; Park Sang-hee	Seenroot	03:36
2.	"Why You?" (Inst.)		Nam Hye-seung; Park Sang-hee		03:36
Total length:					07:02

=== Part 2 ===
No.	Title	Lyrics	Music	Artist	Length
1.	"How Do I Say It?" (어떻게 말할까)	Nam Hye-seung; MIYO; O.WHEN	Nam Hye-seung; MIYO	O.WHEN	04:27
2.	"How Do I Say It?" (Inst.)		Nam Hye-seung; MIYO		04:27
Total length:					08:54

=== Part 3 ===
No.	Title	Lyrics	Music	Artist	Length
1.	"The Same Day" (똑같은 날)	Nam Hye-seung; Park Jin-ho	Nam Hye-seung; Park Jin-ho	Ra.D	04:01
2.	"The Same Day" (Inst.)		Nam Hye-seung; Park Jin-ho		04:01
Total length:					08:02

=== Part 4 ===
No.	Title	Lyrics	Music	Artists	Length
1.	"How About You" (어떨까 넌)	Nam Hye-seung; Park Jin-ho	1601	Cheeze	04:47
2.	"How About You" (Inst.)

=== Part 5 ===
No.	Title	Lyrics	Music	Artist	Length
1.	"Eye Contact" (눈맞춤 (Acoustic Ver.))	Nam Hye-seung; Park Sang-hee	Nam Hye-seung; Park Sang-hee	Kim E-Z (Ggot Jam Project)	03:30
2.	"Eye Contact" (Full Ver.)	Nam Hye-seung; Park Sang-hee	Nam Hye-seung; Park Sang-hee	Kim E-Z (Ggot Jam Project)	03:46
3.	"Eye Contact" (Acoustic Ver. (Inst.))		Nam Hye-seung; Park Sang-hee		03:30
4.	"Eye Contact" (Full Ver. (Inst.))		Nam Hye-seung; Park Sang-hee		03:46
Total length:					14:32

=== Part 6 ===
No.	Title	Lyrics	Music	Artist	Length
1.	"Breathing All Day" (숨쉬는 모든 날)	Nam Hye-seung; Park Jin-ho	Nam Hye-seung; Park Jin-ho	Bumkey	04:26
2.	"Breathing All Day" (Inst.)		Nam Hye-seung; Park Jin-ho		04:26
Total length:					08:52

=== Part 7 ===
No.	Title	Lyrics	Music	Artist	Length
1.	"I've Got a Feeling" (정이 들어버렸어)	Park Jin-ho; Nam Hye-seung	Park Jin-ho; Nam Hye-seung	Kihyun (Monsta X)	04:52
2.	"I've Got a Feeling" (Inst.)		Park Jin-ho; Nam Hye-seung		04:52
Total length:					09:44

=== Part 8 ===
No.	Title	Lyrics	Music	Artist	Length
1.	"The Memory Of That Day" (그날의 기억)	Nam Hye-seung; Park Sang-hee	Nam Hye-seung; Park Sang-hee	Kim Jong-wan (Nell)	03:36
2.	"The Memory Of That Day" (Inst.)		Nam Hye-seung; Park Sang-hee		03:36
Total length:					07:12

=== Part 9 ===
No.	Title	Lyrics	Music	Artist	Length
1.	"Silly Love"	Nam Hye-seung; Park Sang-hee; Jello Ann	Nam Hye-seung; Park Sang-hee	Yoo Ha-jung	03:47
2.	"Silly Love" (Inst.)		Nam Hye-seung; Park Sang-hee		03:47
Total length:					07:34

=== Part 10 ===
No.	Title	Lyrics	Music	Artist	Length
1.	"101 Reasons Why I Like You" (네가 좋은 백 한가지 이유)	Nam Hye-seung; Park Jin-ho	Nam Hye-seung; Park Jin-ho	Ji Chang-wook	03:43
2.	"101 Reasons Why I Like You" (Inst.)		Nam Hye-seung; Park Jin-ho		03:43
Total length:					07:26

=== Chart performance ===
Songs

Title	Year	Peak chart positions	Sales	Remarks
Title	Year	KOR Gaon	Sales	Remarks
"How About You" (Cheeze)	2017	48	KOR: 48,205+	Part 4
"Breathing All Day" (Bumkey)	2017	93	KOR: 17,997+	Part 6
"—" denotes that the song did not chart in that region.

== Ratings ==
Ep.	Original broadcast date	Title	Average audience share			
Ep.	Original broadcast date	Title	Nielsen Korea		TNmS	
Ep.	Original broadcast date	Title	Nationwide	Seoul	Nationwide	Seoul
1	May 10, 2017	Hope for the Future	6.3% (17th)	6.5% (14th)	6.1% (19th)	7.4% (14th)
2	May 10, 2017	Hope for the Future	6.8% (13th)	6.9% (12th)	6.8% (15th)	8.2% (8th)
3	May 11, 2017	Take It	6.1% (NR)	5.8% (NR)	6.3% (NR)	7.0% (NR)
4	May 11, 2017	Take It	7.2% (18th)	7.7% (14th)	7.0% (NR)	7.9% (18th)
5	May 17, 2017	Restraining Order	6.6% (NR)	6.8% (NR)	6.9% (NR)	8.5% (12th)
6	May 17, 2017	Restraining Order	8.0% (13th)	8.5% (9th)	7.4% (18th)	8.2% (15th)
7	May 18, 2017	Reunion and Reunion	6.8% (19th)	6.9% (18th)	6.0% (NR)	6.6% (20th)
8	May 18, 2017	Reunion and Reunion	7.4% (14th)	7.8% (12th)	6.0% (NR)	6.4% (NR)
9	May 24, 2017	Humanity Becomes Hostage	6.8% (20th)	7.2% (18th)	6.5% (NR)	6.9% (NR)
10	May 24, 2017	Humanity Becomes Hostage	8.3% (11th)	8.7% (10th)	7.4% (17th)	8.2% (14th)
11	May 25, 2017	The Beginning That Hasn't Begun	7.1% (17th)	7.9% (13th)	6.1% (NR)	6.8% (NR)
12	May 25, 2017	The Beginning That Hasn't Begun	7.8% (14th)	8.5% (11th)	6.5% (NR)	6.6% (20th)
13	May 31, 2017	Alibi	7.5% (16th)	8.2% (13th)	6.9% (18th)	7.7% (15th)
14	May 31, 2017	Alibi	9.3% (8th)	10.0% (8th)	7.9% (15th)	9.0% (10th)
15	June 1, 2017	Untruthful Truth Game	8.4% (13th)	8.6% (11th)	7.2% (17th)	8.3% (14th)
16	June 1, 2017	Untruthful Truth Game	9.3% (11th)	9.6% (8th)	7.8% (16th)	8.9% (12th)
17	June 7, 2017	Eun Bong-hee's Prime	8.4% (13th)	9.1% (10th)	7.3% (17th)	7.5% (13th)
18	June 7, 2017	Eun Bong-hee's Prime	9.8% (8th)	10.2% (7th)	7.7% (NR)	8.1% (NR)
19	June 8, 2017	Truth vs. Secret	8.0% (12th)	8.5% (10th)	7.3% (17th)	7.3% (16th)
20	June 8, 2017	Truth vs. Secret	9.6% (9th)	10.2% (8th)	8.3% (11th)	8.4% (10th)
21	June 14, 2017	In This Limited World	7.7% (14th)	8.3% (9th)	7.0% (NR)	8.2% (13th)
22	June 14, 2017	In This Limited World	9.1% (7th)	9.8% (6th)	7.8% (16th)	8.7% (9th)
23	June 15, 2017	48 Hours Later	7.8% (14th)	8.2% (10th)	6.9% (19th)	7.6% (13th)
24	June 15, 2017	48 Hours Later	9.4% (7th)	9.8% (6th)	7.6% (16th)	8.1% (10th)
25	June 21, 2017	Attributable Reasons	9.0% (9th)	10.3% (8th)	6.6% (20th)	6.7% (16th)
26	June 21, 2017	Attributable Reasons	10.5% (7th)	11.7% (5th)	7.8% (15th)	8.5% (9th)
27	June 22, 2017	The Memory of That Day	8.4% (11th)	8.8% (10th)	7.5% (16th)	7.9% (13th)
28	June 22, 2017	The Memory of That Day	9.7% (8th)	10.4% (8th)	8.0% (15th)	8.1% (12th)
29	June 28, 2017	Postponement	6.7% (17th)	7.2% (13th)	6.1% (NR)	7.9% (13th)
30	June 28, 2017	Postponement	8.6% (9th)	9.5% (7th)	6.7% (17th)	8.0% (10th)
31	June 29, 2017	The Discovery of a Memory	7.7% (14th)	8.4% (9th)	6.3% (NR)	7.3% (14th)
32	June 29, 2017	The Discovery of a Memory	8.6% (10th)	9.1% (8th)	6.8% (17th)	7.8% (11th)
33	July 5, 2017	Testing the Waters	7.2% (17th)	7.8% (13th)	6.9% (NR)	7.5% (16th)
34	July 5, 2017	Testing the Waters	9.2% (7th)	9.8% (7th)	7.2% (20th)	7.4% (17th)
35	July 6, 2017	Return	8.0% (17th)	8.5% (9th)	7.3% (19th)	8.8% (13th)
36	July 6, 2017	Return	9.2% (9th)	9.9% (7th)	7.9% (17th)	9.4% (10th)
37	July 12, 2017	In Court	7.2% (16th)	7.4% (15th)	6.9% (20th)	7.7% (19th)
38	July 12, 2017	In Court	9.2% (8th)	9.4% (7th)	8.0% (17th)	8.7% (13th)
39	July 13, 2017	Return to the Daily Life	8.5% (12th)	9.0% (9th)	8.6% (15th)	9.5% (10th)
40	July 13, 2017	Return to the Daily Life	9.5% (8th)	10.2% (6th)	8.7% (14th)	8.9% (13th)
Average			7.2%	7.9%	8.2%	8.7%
In the table above, the blue numbers represent the lowest ratings and the red numbers represent the highest ratings.; NR denotes that the drama did not rank in the top 20 daily programs on that date.

== Awards and nominations ==
Year	Award	Category	Recipient	Result	Ref.
2017	Korea Drama Awards	Excellence Award, Actress (Drama)	Nam Ji-hyun	Nominated	
2017	25th SBS Drama Awards	Top Excellence Award, Actor in a Wednesday–Thursday Drama	Ji Chang-wook	Nominated	
2017	25th SBS Drama Awards	Excellence Award, Actor in a Wednesday–Thursday Drama	Choi Tae-joon	Nominated	
2017	25th SBS Drama Awards	Excellence Award, Actress in a Wednesday–Thursday Drama	Nam Ji-hyun	Won	
2017	25th SBS Drama Awards	Best New Actress	Kwon Nara	Nominated	
2017	25th SBS Drama Awards	Best Supporting Actress	Kim Ye-won	Nominated	
2017	25th SBS Drama Awards	Best Couple Award	Ji Chang-wook and Nam Ji-hyun	Nominated	

== Adaptation ==
The series got the dorama adaptation, which was aired on MBS and TBS across Japan, with Disney+ streamed the series globally. An Indian adaptation in Hindi language was titled A Legal Affair was also confirmed to aired on JioCinema.
