= Nam Ji-hyun =

South Korean actress (born 1995)

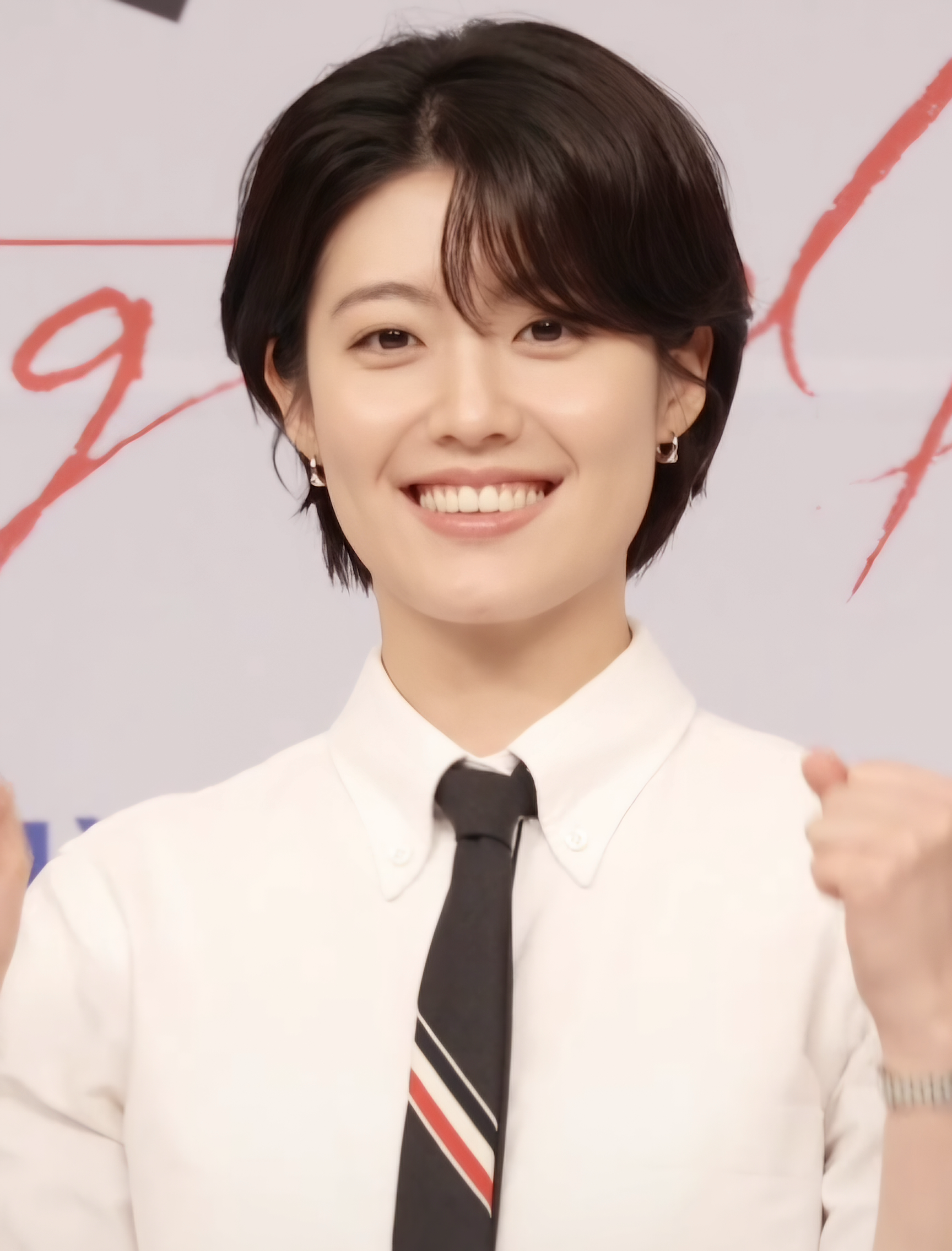
- Nam in July 2024
- Born: September 17, 1995 (age 31); Incheon, South Korea
- Education: Sogang University (Psychology)
- Occupation: Actress
- Years active: 2004–present
- Agent: Management Soop
- Height: 165 cm (5 ft 5 in)

Korean name
- Hangul: 남지현
- Hanja: 南志鉉
- RR: Nam Jihyeon
- MR: Nam Chihyŏn
- Website: msoopent.com

Nam Ji-hyun (Korean: 남지현; born September 17, 1995) is a South Korean actress. Nam began her career in 2004 as a child actress in the television series Say You Love Me (2004). She is best known for her roles in Queen Seondeok (2009), Suspicious Partner (2017), 100 Days My Prince (2018), 365: Repeat the Year (2020), Good Partner (2024), and To My Beloved Thief (2025).

== Early life and education ==
Nam Ji-hyun was born on September 17, 1995 at Incheon, South Korea. When she was six, She and her family relocated to Bupyeong District. She attended Baekun Elementary School and Sangjeong Middle School before continuing her education at Incheon Choeun High School.

In 2014, she gained admission to Sogang University as a Psychology major in 2014, through regular admissions. She finished her degree in February 2020, despite her busy schedule as an active actress in between her studies.

== Career ==
=== 2004–2012: Beginnings as a child actress ===
In February 2004, Nam began her acting career through MBC television series titled Say You Love Me (2004). Before her official debut, she worked as a child model for a magazine and appeared on the MBC entertainment show Radio Report. In 2005, Nam made her film debut by portraying the younger version of Yoon So-yi's character in Shadowless Sword.

Nam secured a lead role the following year in the 2006 film My Captain, Mr. Underground, directed by Song Chang-soo. She played the bubbly second-grader Ji-min, whose family unit consists of her grandfather (played by Lee Do-kyung) and her dog, Yeoboya. Her next project was the SBS drama My Love, where she played Kim Min, a performance that earned her the Best Young Actress Award at the 2006 SBS Drama Awards. That same year, she appeared in the SBS Christmas special drama My Love Clementine, written by Park Beom-soo and directed by Hong Chang-wook. She took on the role of the main character, 9-year-old Ba-da, the adopted daughter of Dal-ho (Son Hyun-joo). After a tragic car accident claims her adoptive mother's life, Dal-ho suffers memory loss and desperately struggles to protect Ba-da while preserving their cherished memories.

Nam appeared in the 2007 film Mapado 2: Back to the Island. That same year, she starred in the SBS drama Lobbyist, portraying the young version of Yoo So-young, a character played by Jang Jin-young. Her performance stood out, earning her a nomination for the Best Young Actress Award at the 2007 SBS Drama Awards.

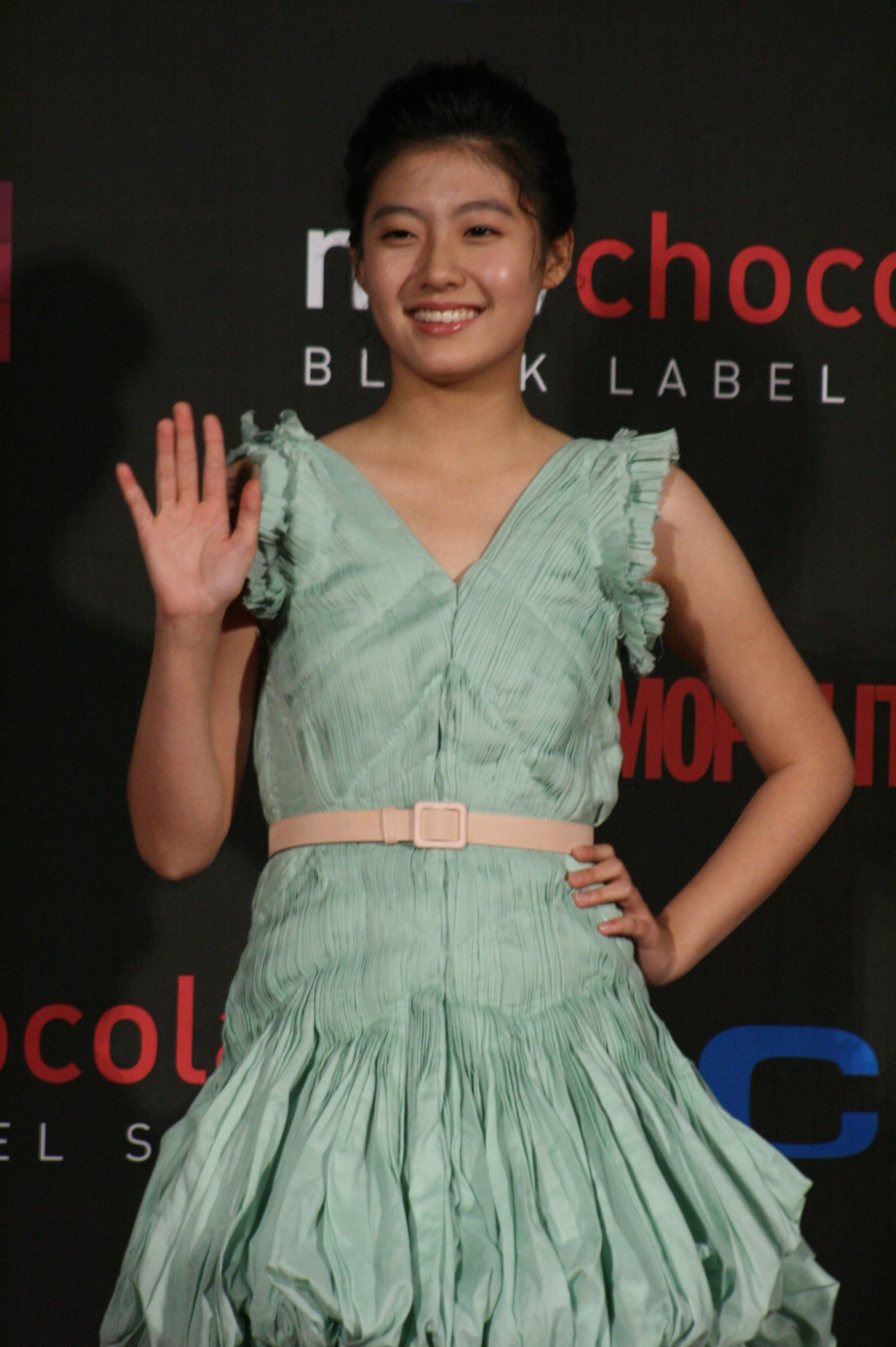
Nam at the 2009 Style Icon Awards

In 2008, Nam portrayed the young Queen Soheon in the KBS2 drama The Great King, Sejong, a role played by Lee Yoon-ji as an adult. That same year, Nam gained recognition for her role as the childhood version of Kim Ji-hyun (adult version was portrayed by Han Ji-hye) in the MBC drama East of Eden. Her performance earned her the Best Young Actress award at the 2008 MBC Drama Awards.

In 2009 she returned to prominence as the young Deok-man (young Queen Sondeok), the childhood version of Lee Yo-won's character in the MBC historical drama Queen Seondeok. This performance earned her the Best Young Actress award at the 2009 MBC Drama Awards. Later that year, Nam starred in Will It Snow for Christmas?, portraying the teenage Han Ji-wan, the love interest of Cha Kang-jin (played by Kim Soo-hyun). The adult versions of Han Ji-wan and Cha Kang-jin were later portrayed by Han Ye-seul and Go Soo, respectively.

In 2010, Nam portrayed the young Jeong-yeon (Park Jin-hee's character) in the SBS drama Giant. That same year, she was cast in the film Mr. Go and spent a year rehearsing and honing her Chinese and circus skills. However, due to Chinese investment in the production, she was replaced by a local actress at the request of Chinese authorities, leading to the cancellation of her role.

In 2011, Nam starred in the dark fantasy films A Reason to Live (2011), co-starring Song Hye-kyo. She delivered a compelling performance as a young genius grappling with the aftermath of domestic violence. Director Lee Jung-hyang praised her interpretation and insight, noting her impressive emotional expression on set. He marveled at her combination of diligence and giftedness.

She later appeared in the miniseries Girl Detective, Park Hae-sol (2012). Her performance earned her the Best Young Actress award at the 2012 KBS Drama Awards. She then made a special appearance in the youth drama To the Beautiful You (2012) as Hong Da-hae, an aspiring violinist and a childhood frenemy of Cha Eun-gyeol (Lee Hyun-woo).

=== 2013–2014: Transition period ===
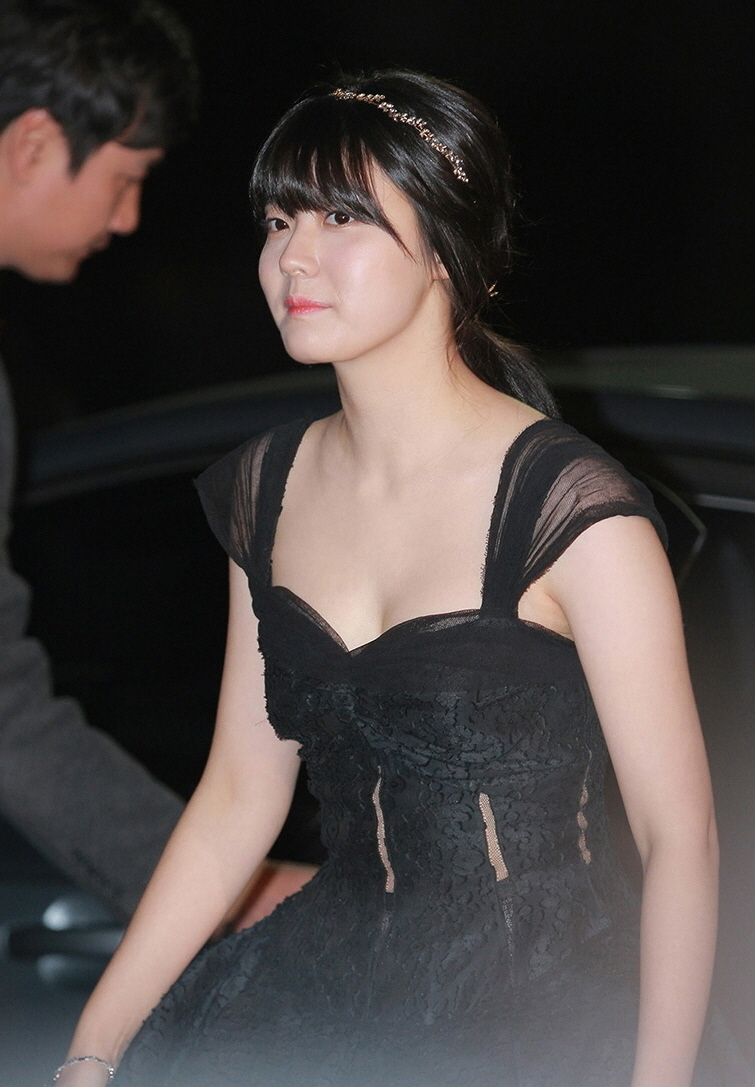
Nam at the 2013 Blue Dragon Film Awards

Nam transitioned from a child actress to more mature roles, notably appearing in Jang Joon-hwan film Hwayi: A Monster Boy (2013), as Yu-kyung, the love interest of the protagonist Hwayi (played by Yeo Jin-goo). The film marked a turning point for both Yeo and Nam as they rebranded from child actors to full-fledged actors. For this role, Nam was nominated for Best New Actress at the 2013 Blue Dragon Film Awards.

She followed this with the SBS drama Angel Eyes (2014). In this series, she portrayed the younger Yoon Soo-wan, a blind woman whose life intertwines with that of her childhood friend, Park Dong-joo, played by Kang Ha-neul. The adult versions of Yoon Soo-wan and Park Dong-joo were later portrayed by Koo Hye-sun and Lee Sang-yoon, respectively.

That same year she appeared in the KBS2 family weekend drama What Happens to My Family? (2014) as Kang Seo-wool, a country girl with a strong Chungcheong dialect who moves to Seoul hoping to marry Cha Dal-bong (Park Hyung-sik). Her on-screen chemistry with Park Hyung-sik won them the Best Couple Award at the 2014 KBS Drama Awards, and Nam also received the Best New Actress award. In 2015 she was nominated for Best New Actress at the 51st Baeksang Arts Awards.

=== 2016–2020: Rising popularity and leading roles ===
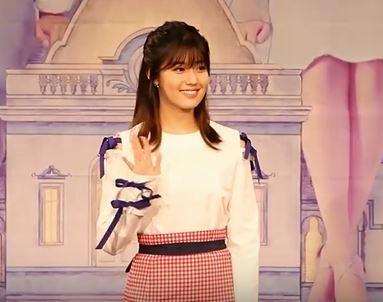
Nam at the press-conference of MBC's romantic-comedy Shopping King Louie

In 2016, Nam headlined MBC's romantic-comedy Shopping King Louie alongside Seo In-guk. This marked her first lead role in a miniseries, rather than a one-act or weekend drama, since transitioning into an adult actress. She portrayed Ko Bok-shil, a 21-year-old resourceful country girl from Gangwon Province who is quick to adapt to life in Seoul despite her initial lack of technological literacy. Nam impressed viewers with her engaging performance in the role, the series earned positive reviews from viewers and achieving multiple ratings top spots in its time slot.

That same year, Nam also appeared in the film Tunnel, where she portrayed Mi-na, trapped in a tunnel with the protagonist played by Ha Jung-woo. Director Kim Sung-hoon praised Nam's thorough preparation and ability to adapt to improvisation on set. He noted her composure and diligence. Nam's professionalism and talent left a lasting impression on the director, who acknowledged that there was much to learn from her, despite her young age.

In 2017, Nam starred in SBS's legal drama Suspicious Partner as Eun Bong-hee, initially a prosecutor trainee and later a lawyer. The plot centers on Bong-hee becoming a murder suspect after her ex-boyfriend's body is found in her house, leading to conflict with District Attorney Jang Moo-young and a developing romantic relationship with her defender, Noh Ji-wook (Ji Chang-wook). The show enjoyed modest overall viewership but consistently topped important demographic charts (ages 20-49), streaming figures, and brand reputation rankings. She won the Excellence Award, Actress in a Miniseries at 2017 SBS Drama Awards.

In 2018, Nam starred alongside Doh Kyung-soo in the historical romance drama 100 Days My Prince. She portrayed Yoon Yi-seo, who lives under the assumed identity of Yeon Hong-shim. Yi-seo is an intelligent, strong woman who runs Joseon's first all-solution agency in Songjoo village while hiding her noble past and longing to reunite with her brother. Airing on tvN from September 10 to October 30, 2018, the drama peaked at 14.412% viewership, making it one of the highest-rated series in Korean cable television history. On Good Data's TV Drama Buzz-worthiness, the series ranked second for four weeks post-premiere, then first for three weeks from the second week of October. Nam also entered the Top 10 TV Drama TV Performer Buzz-worthiness, peaking at second in mid-October.

In 2020, Nam starred in the fantasy mystery thriller 365: Repeat the Year, portraying Shin Ga-hyun, a perfectionist webtoon writer. Her character, the artist behind the webcomic series "Hidden Killer" for three years, decides to "reset" her life by one year after an accident leaves her temporarily in a wheelchair. For this role, she won the Best Actress in a Monday-Tuesday Miniseries at the 2020 MBC Drama Awards.

=== 2021–present: Streaming and television roles and further acclaim ===
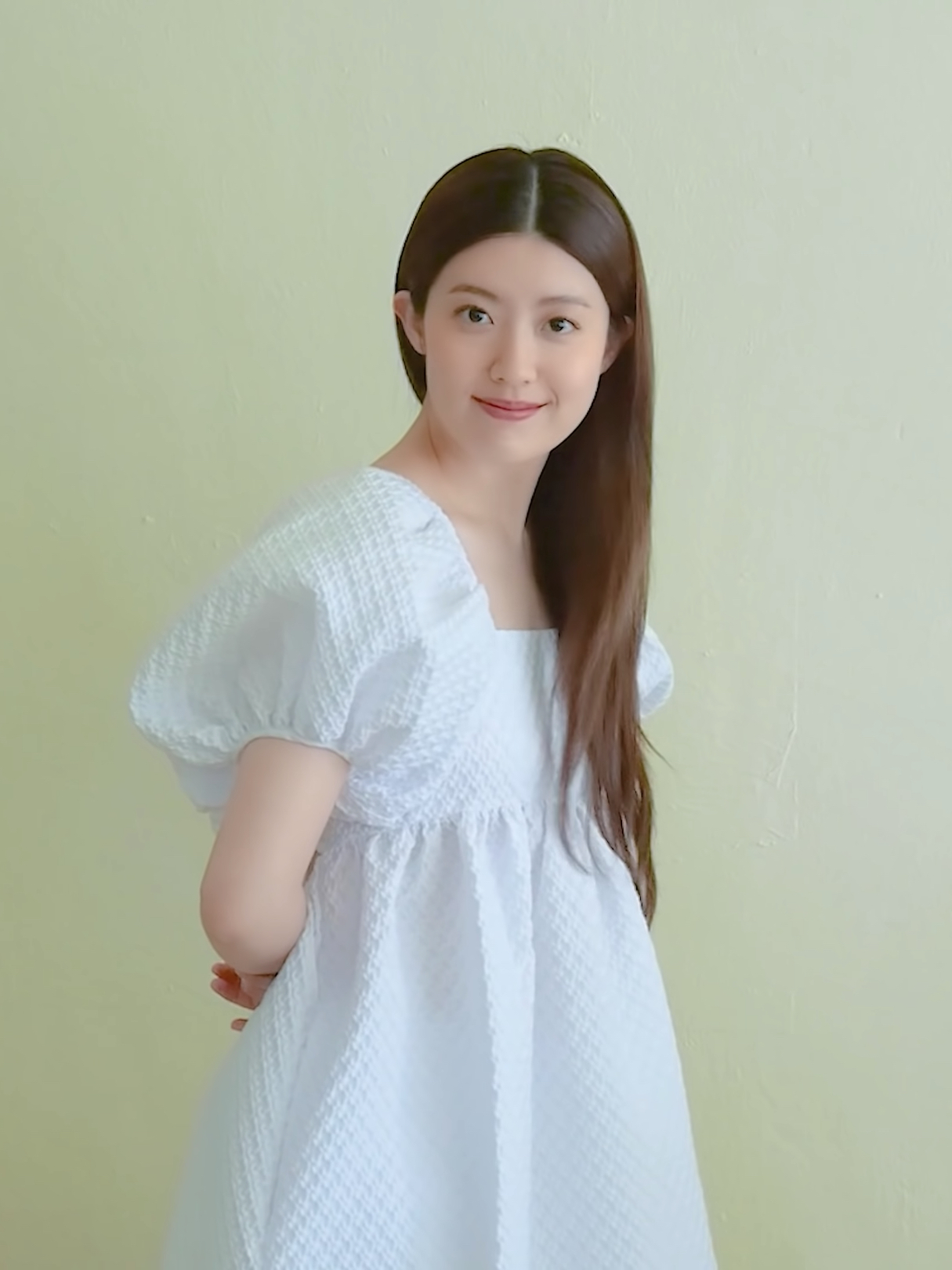
Nam's Marie Claire interview (2021)

Nam starred as Jeong Jin in the 2021 streaming series The Witch's Diner, alongside Song Ji-hyo, who portrays the witch Jo Hee-ra, and Chae Jong-hyeop, who plays Jeong Jin's best friend. As Jeong Jin reaches her lowest point, having lost her job and been abandoned, she allows the witch to operate her failing restaurant in exchange for a revenge wish. The series ran on TVING for eight episodes from July 16 to August 13, 2021, and was subsequently aired on tvN for five episodes in January 2022.

In 2022, Nam, Kim Go-eun and Park Ji-hu starred together as three sisters in the tvN series Little Women, a loose adaptation of Louisa May Alcott's novel of the same name, penned by Jeong Seo-kyeong and directed by Kim Hee-won. The story centers on these sisters, who become embroiled with one of the country's wealthiest and most influential families. Nam portrayed Oh In-kyung, the middle sister and a reporter with a strong moral compass. The show received a perfect 100% rating from critics on Rotten Tomatoes, with critics praising Nam's performance. Nathan Sartain from Ready Set Cut remarked that that Nam's depiction was "syringed with underlying vehemence," affirming her strong fit for the role. Meanwhile, Tanu I. Raj of NME noted that Nam’s character was "the most complex, layered, and nuanced" in the series.

In the following year, Nam returned to streaming platforms in 2023 to star as the main lead, Choi Soo-young, in a character-driven thriller High Cookie. Soo‑young, a non‑regular factory worker who became her family’s head after leaving school at 18, is drawn into a crisis when her younger sister falls into a coma after eating a wish‑granting but dangerously addictive homemade cookie. To save her, Soo‑young infiltrates the elite Jeonghan High School under the alias Lee Eun‑seo to track down the cookie’s creator and obtain an antidote.

Nam return to terrestrial television with SBS legal drama Good Partner, She portraying Han Yu-ri, a rookie lawyer in Divorce Team 1 at Daejeong Law Firm, alongside Jang Na-ra, Kim Jun-han, and Pyo Ji-hoon. The series was written by Choi Yu-na, a real-life divorce lawyer, and directed by Kim Ga-ram. Airing from July 12 to September 20, 2024, the drama peaked at 17.7% in Nielsen ratings. Its strong viewership led to a renewal for a second season; however, due to scheduling conflicts, Nam will not return for the new season. For her performance, she received the Top Excellence Award for Actress in a Miniseries in the Humanity/Fantasy Drama category at the 2024 SBS Drama Awards.

In early 2026, Nam Ji-Hyun returned to a historical drama set in the Joseon Dynasty for the first time in 8 years, with this project also marking her comeback to the romantic comedy genre. Nam Ji-Hyun portrayed the character Hong Eun-Jo, a woman born to a slave mother and a noble father. Hong Eun-Jo leads a double life: by day, she is a physician working at the People's Clinic, while at night she transforms into Gil-Dong, a righteous thief who robs the granaries of corrupt officials and distributes the food to those in need. The series premiered on KBS2 on January 3, 2026, and airs every Saturday and Sunday at 21:20 (KST).

== Other ventures ==
=== Endorsements ===
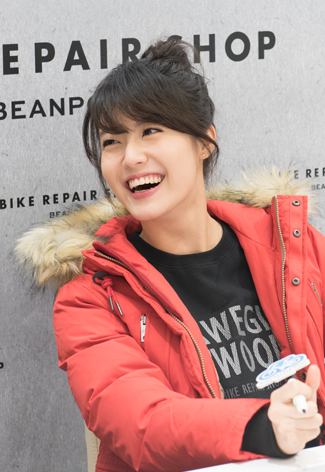
Nam at the 2014 Beanpole Bike Repair Shop campaign

Nam's endorsement career began in 2008 when she featured alongside Park Bo-young in a Johnson & Johnson Clean & Clear advertisement for their Deep Action Refreshing Cleanser. From 2008 to 2010, she was involved in the Female Students campaign" for educational reference book Ugongbi.

In 2012, she represented Waterbear Soft and Amos Edu SOL. The following year, she starred in a Nongshim Neoguri advertisement titled "Three Women," alongside Shim So-heon and Lee Kyung-eun. In 2014, following her work on What Happens to My Family? she collaborated with Park Hyung-sik for Samsung C&T's Beanpole, promoting their Bike Repair Shop campaign.

Following her work on Suspicious Partner, Nam filmed a cosmetics commercial for Allets in 2017. In 2019, the cosmetics brand Hayejin released a pictorial featuring her. After the success of Good Partner, Nam became a model for Hyundai's New HD Commercial in 2024.

=== Philanthropy ===
On December 8, 2010, Nam Ji-hyun and fellow child actor Maeng Myeong-chang participated in the "2010 Hope Tree Campaign" organized by the NGO Good Neighbors, an initiative aimed at supporting underprivileged children globally and in South Korea. The actors, who were advertising models for the educational reference book Ugongbi, donated a portion of their modeling fees to assist low-income families, citing a desire to help peers facing financial obstacles to education.

== Filmography ==
=== Film ===
Year	Title	Role	Notes	Ref.
2005	Shadowless Sword	young Yeon So-ha		
2006	My Captain Mr. Underground	Park Ji-min		
2007	Mapado 2: Back to the Island	Girl in the past		
2009	If You Were Me 4	Park Jin-ju	segment: "Blue Birds on the Desk"	
2009	Astro Boy	Cora	animated, Korean dubbing	
2010	Happy Ulleung Man	Documentary narrator		
2010	Family Plan	Ji-min	short film	
2010	Ghost (Be With Me)		segment: "Tell Me Your Name"	
2011	A Reason to Live	Ji-min		
2013	Hwayi: A Monster Boy	Yoo-kyung		
2016	The Tunnel	Mina		
2016	The Map Against The World	Soon-Sil		

=== Television series ===
Year	Title	Role	Notes	Ref.
2002	Radio Report			
2004	Say You Love Me	young Seo Young-chae		
2006	My Love	Kim Min		
2006	My Love Clementine	Jang Ba-da		
2007	Lobbyist	young Yoo So-young (Maria)		
2008	The Great King, Sejong	young Princess Shim		
2008	Our Happy Ending	Kang Mi-na		
2008	East of Eden	young Kim Ji-hyun		
2009	Queen Seondeok	young Princess Deokman		
2009	Will It Snow for Christmas?	young Han Ji-wan		
2010	Giant	young Hwang Jung-yeon		
2010	It's Me, Grandmother	Park Eun-ha		
2011	Warrior Baek Dong-soo	young Yoo Ji-sun		
2012	Drama Special Series: "Girl Detective, Park Hae-sol"	Park Hae-sol	one-act drama	
2012	Can't Live Without You	Eun-deok		
2012	To the Beautiful You	Hong Da-hae		
2014	Angel Eyes	young Yoon Soo-wan		
2014	What Happens to My Family?	Kang Seo-wool		
2015	Late Night Restaurant	Hye-ri	Cameo (Episode 7)	
2016	Mystery Freshman	Oh Ah-yeong	Drama special	
2016	Shopping King Louie	Ko Bok-shil	Lead role	
2017	Suspicious Partner	Eun Bong-hee	Lead role	
2018	100 Days My Prince	Yeon Hong-sim / Yoon Yi-suh	Lead role	
2019	Dear My Room		Cameo (Episode 11)	
2020	365: Repeat the Year	Shin Ga-hyun	Lead role	
2021	JTBC Drama Festa: "Off Route"	Kang Su-ji	one-act drama	
2022	Little Women	Oh In-kyung	Lead role	
2024	Good Partner	Han Yu-ri	Lead role	
2026	To My Beloved Thief	Hong Eun-jo / Hong Gil-dong		
2026	Make Me Tingle	Yeon-soo		

=== Web series ===
Year	Title	Role	Ref.
2021	The Witch's Diner	Jeong Jin	
2023	High Cookie	Choi Soo-young	

=== Music video appearances ===
Year	Song title	Artist	Ref.
2015	"Shaking" (흔들린다)	Taeil (Block B)	

== Awards and nominations ==
Name of the award ceremony, year presented, category, nominee of the award, and the result of the nomination
Award ceremony	Year	Category	Nominee / Work	Result	Ref.
Asia Artist Awards	2016	Best Entertainer Award, Actress	Shopping King Louie	Won	
Baeksang Arts Awards	2015	Best New Actress – Television	What Happens to My Family?	Nominated	
Blue Dragon Film Awards	2013	Best New Actress	Hwayi: A Monster Boy	Nominated	
Buil Film Awards	2012	Best New Actress	A Reason to Live	Nominated	
Daejeon Special FX Festival	2024	Best Actress	High Cookie	Won	
Dong-A.com's Pick	2018	Next Generation Noteworthy Actress	Nam Ji-hyun	Won	
KBS Drama Awards	2012	Best Young Actress	Girl Detective, Park Hae-sol	Won	
KBS Drama Awards	2014	Best New Actress	What Happens to My Family?	Won	
KBS Drama Awards	2014	Best Couple Award	Nam Ji-hyun with Park Hyung-sik; What Happens to My Family?	Won	
Korea Consumer Agency Culture and Entertainment Awards	2024	Actor of the Year	Good Partner	Won	
Korea Drama Awards	2017	Excellence Award, Actress (Drama)	Suspicious Partner	Nominated	
MBC Drama Awards	2008	Best Young Actress	East of Eden	Won	
MBC Drama Awards	2009	Best Young Actress	Queen Seondeok	Won	
MBC Drama Awards	2016	Best New Actress	Shopping King Louie	Won	
MBC Drama Awards	2016	Excellence Award, Actress in a Miniseries	Shopping King Louie	Nominated	
MBC Drama Awards	2016	Best Couple Award	Nam Ji-hyun with Seo In-guk; Shopping King Louie	Nominated	
MBC Drama Awards	2020	Top Excellence Award, Actress in a Monday-Tuesday Miniseries	365: Repeat the Year	Won	
MBC Drama Awards	2020	Best Couple Award	Nam Ji-hyun with Lee Joon-hyuk; 365: Repeat the Year	Nominated	
SBS Drama Awards	2006	Best Young Actress	My Love	Won	
SBS Drama Awards	2007	Best Young Actress	Lobbyist	Nominated	
SBS Drama Awards	2017	Excellence Award, Actress in a Wednesday-Thursday Drama	Suspicious Partner	Won	
SBS Drama Awards	2017	Best Couple Award	Nam Ji-hyun with Ji Chang-wook; Suspicious Partner	Nominated	
SBS Drama Awards	2024	Top Excellence Award, Actress in a Miniseries Humanity/Fantasy Drama	Good Partner	Won	
The Seoul Awards	2018	Popularity Award (Actress)	Nam Ji-hyun	Nominated	
