= 2024 SBS Drama Awards =

32nd edition of award ceremony

- Official poster
- Date: December 21, 2024
- Site: SBS Prism Tower, Sangam-dong, Mapo-gu, Seoul
- Hosted by: Shin Dong-yup; Kim Hye-yoon; Kim Ji-yeon
- Produced by: Jang Seok-jin
- Official website: SBS Awards

Highlights
- Grand Prize (Daesang): Jang Na-ra

Television coverage
- Network: SBS
- Viewership: Ratings: 3.3%; Viewership: 667,000

The 2024 SBS Drama Awards, presented by Seoul Broadcasting System (SBS) was held on December 21, 2024, from 20:35 (KST) at the SBS Prism Tower in Sangam-dong, Mapo-gu, Seoul. The show was hosted by Shin Dong-yup for the eighth consecutive time, together with Kim Hye-yoon and Kim Ji-yeon.

A special congratulatory stage by dance team La Chica, (G)I-dle and a live performance of "Bam Yang Gang" by Bibi, Ko Kyu-pil, and Ahn Chang-hwan from The Fiery Priest 2 was presented in the awards ceremony. The band performances of the cast of the upcoming 2025 film Spring of the Four Seasons was a surprise item at the ceremony. Jang Na-ra won the Grand Prize (Daesang) for her role in Good Partner, while Park Shin-hye won the Director's Award for her portrayal in The Judge from Hell.

== Winners and nominees ==
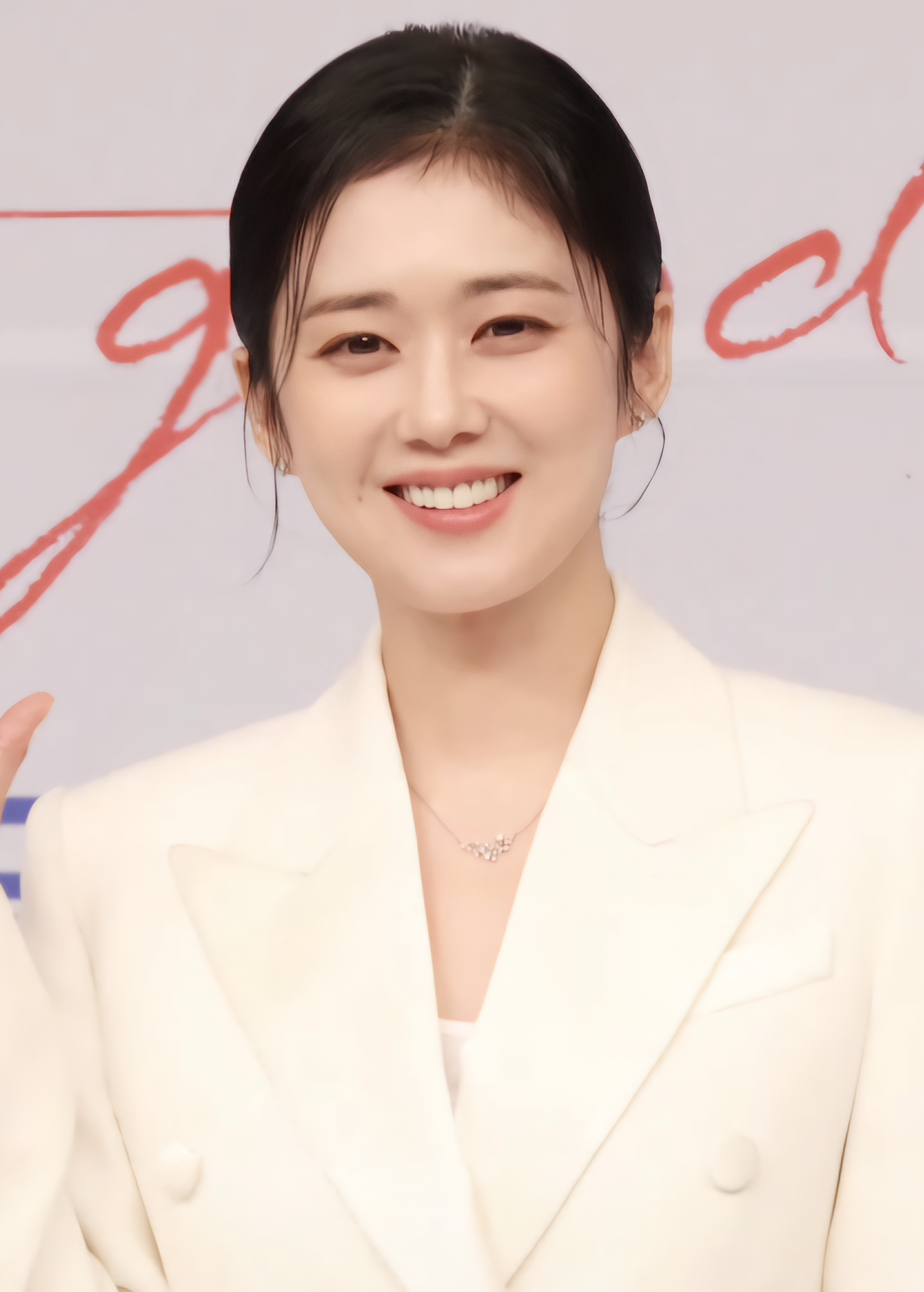
Jang Na-ra, Grand Prize (Daesang) winner

Nominations for Grand Prize were revealed on December 18, 2024.

Winners are listed first and denoted in bold.

List of Awards
Grand Prize (Daesang)	Director's Award
**Jang Na-ra – Good Partner**; Park Shin-hye – The Judge from Hell; Ji Sung – Connection; Kim Nam-gil – The Fiery Priest 2; Ahn Bo-hyun – Flex X Cop; Hwang Jung-eum – The Escape of the Seven	**Park Shin-hye – The Judge from Hell**
Top Excellence Award, Actor in a Miniseries Genre/Action Drama	Top Excellence Award, Actress in a Miniseries Genre/Action Drama
**Ahn Bo-hyun – Flex X Cop**	**Jeon Mi-do – Connection**; Park Ji-hyun – Flex X Cop; Yoon Yoo-sun – Flex X Cop; Baek Ji-won – Connection; Kim Min-ju – Connection; Jung Yoo-min – Connection; Jeong Ga-hee – Flex X Cop; Yoon Sa-bong – Connection; Jeon Hye-jin – Flex X Cop; Ryu Hye-rin – Connection; Seo Yi-ra – Connection
Top Excellence Award, Actor in a Seasonal Drama	Top Excellence Award, Actress in a Seasonal Drama
**Kim Nam-gil – The Fiery Priest 2**	**Lee Hanee – The Fiery Priest 2**; Hwang Jung-eum – The Escape of the Seven; Lee Yu-bi – The Escape of the Seven; Bibi – The Fiery Priest 2; Shin Eun-kyung – The Escape of the Seven; Jo Yoon-hee – The Escape of the Seven; Baek Ji-won – The Fiery Priest 2; Shim Yi-young – The Escape of the Seven; Hwang Jeong-min – The Fiery Priest 2; Heo Soon-mi – The Fiery Priest 2
Top Excellence Award, Actor in a Miniseries Humanity/Fantasy Drama	Top Excellence Award, Actress in a Miniseries Humanity/Fantasy Drama
**Kim Jae-young – The Judge from Hell**	**Nam Ji-hyun – Good Partner**
Achievement Award	Drama of the Year
**Kim Young-ok – The Judge from Hell**	**Connection**
Excellence Award, Actor in a Miniseries Genre/Action Drama	Excellence Award, Actress in a Miniseries Genre/Action Drama
**Kwak Si-yang – Flex X Cop**; Ahn Bo-hyun – Flex X Cop; Moon Sung-keun – Connection	**Park Ji-hyun – Flex X Cop**; Jeon Mi-do – Connection; Jeong Ga-hee – Flex X Cop
Excellence Award, Actor in a Seasonal Drama	Excellence Award, Actress in a Seasonal Drama
**Kim Sung-kyun – The Fiery Priest 2**; **Sung Joon – The Fiery Priest 2**; Uhm Ki-joon – The Escape of the Seven; Lee Joon – The Escape of the Seven	**Bibi – The Fiery Priest 2**; **Lee Yu-bi – The Escape of the Seven**; Hwang Jung-eum – The Escape of the Seven
Excellence Award, Actor in a Miniseries Humanity/Fantasy Drama	Excellence Award, Actress in a Miniseries Humanity/Fantasy Drama
**Kim Joon-han – Good Partner**; **Pyo Ji-hoon – Good Partner**; Kim Jae-young – The Judge from Hell; Lee Kyu-han – The Judge from Hell	**Kim Ah-young – The Judge from Hell**; Nam Ji-hyun – Good Partner; Seo Jeong-yeon – Good Partner
Best Supporting Actor in a Miniseries Humanity/Fantasy Drama	Best Supporting Actress in a Miniseries Humanity/Fantasy Drama
**Kim In-kwon – The Judge from Hell**; **Ji Seung-hyun – Good Partner**	**Kim Jae-hwa – The Judge from Hell**; **Kim Hye-hwa – The Judge from Hell**
Best Supporting Actor in a Miniseries Genre/Action	Best Supporting Actress in a Miniseries Genre/Action
**Kwon Yul – Connection**; **Kim Kyung-nam – Connection**	**Yoon Sa-bong – Connection**; **Jung Yoo-min – Connection**
Best Supporting Actor in a Miniseries Seasonal Drama	Best Supporting Actress in a Miniseries Seasonal Drama
**Seo Hyun-woo – The Fiery Priest 2**	**Shim Yi-young – The Escape of the Seven**
Best New Actor	Best New Actress
**Kang Sang-joon – Flex X Cop**; **Kim Shin-bi – Flex X Cop**; **Seo Bum-june – The Fiery Priest 2**	**Kim Min-ju – Connection**; **Choi Yu-ju – The Escape of the Seven**
Best Young Actor	Best Young Actress
**Moon Woo-jin – The Fiery Priest 2**	**Jeon Yu-na – Good Partner**
Best Supporting Team	Best Performance
**Good Partner, Daejung Law Firm**	**Lee Kyu-han – The Judge from Hell**; **Han Jae-yi – Good Partner**
Best Couple Award	Scene Stealer Award
**Park Shin-hye and Kim Jae-young – The Judge from Hell**	**Ko Kyu-pil – The Fiery Priest 2**; **Ahn Chang-hwan – The Fiery Priest 2**

== Presenters ==
On December 21, 2024, SBS announced the presenters of the awards.

Presenter(s)	Award(s)
Kim Do-hoon and Kim Yoon-hye	
Park Hyung-sik and Heo Jun-ho	
Kim Ji-yeon, Yook Sung-jae and Kim Ji-hoon	
Kim Hye-yoon, Lomon	
Nam Goong-min, Jeon Yeo-bin	
Jang Dong-yoon, Kim Bo-ra	
Byun Young-joo, Lee Young-jong	
Im Se-mi, Kim Yo-han	
Lee Sung-kyung	Director's Award
Lee Je-hoon and Kim Tae-ri	Grand Prize

== See also ==
- 2024 MBC Drama Awards
- 2024 KBS Drama Awards
