= Kim Jae-young (actor) =

South Korean actor and model

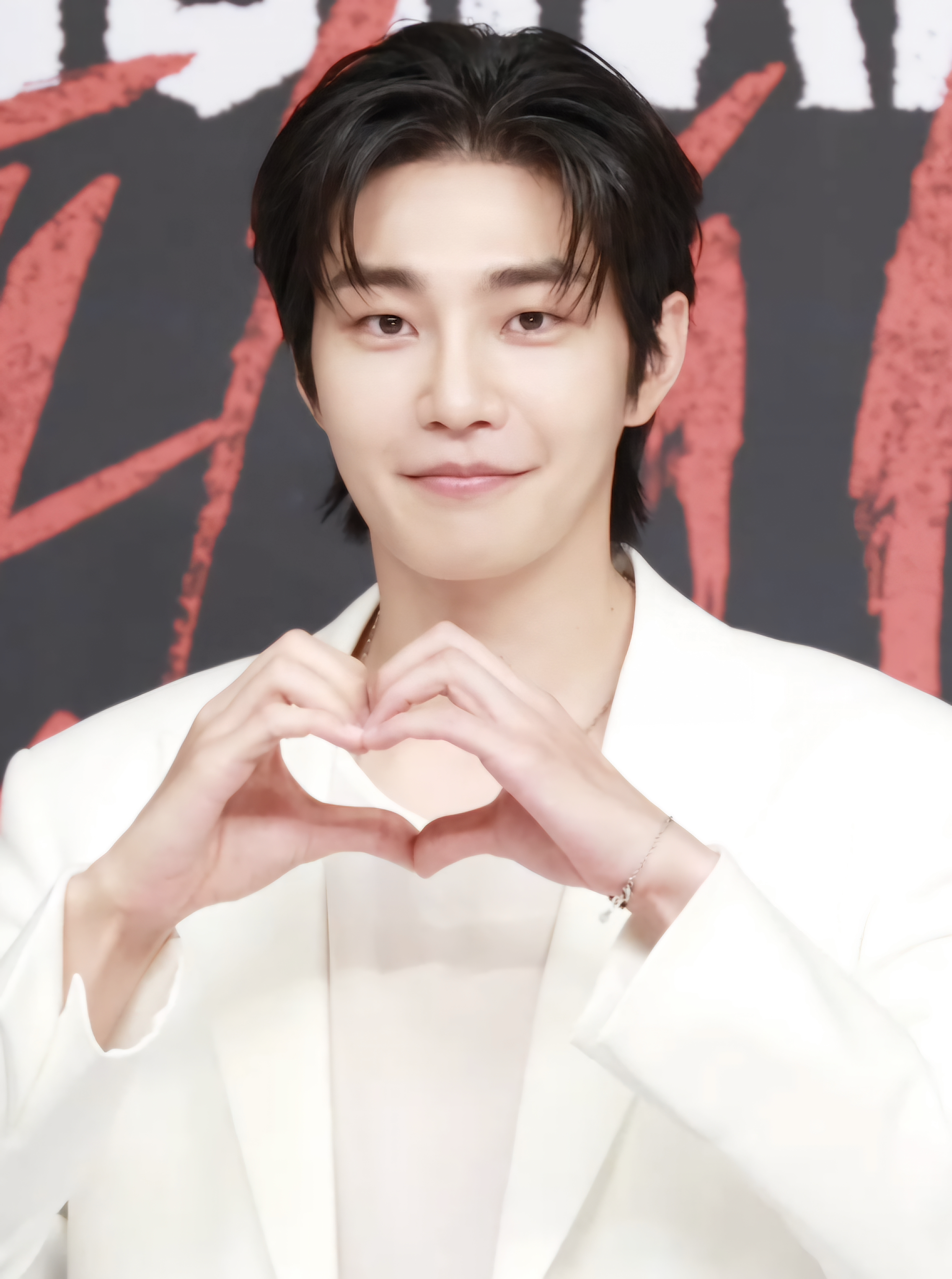
- Kim in 2024
- Born: September 30, 1988 (age 38); South Korea
- Occupations: Actor; model
- Years active: 2011–present
- Agent(s): Fantagio; Management S

Korean name
- Hangul: 김재영
- RR: Gim Jaeyeong
- MR: Kim Chaeyŏng
- Website: Official website

Kim Jae-young (Korean: 김재영; born September 30, 1988) is a South Korean actor and model. Kim is notable for his roles in 100 Days My Prince (2018), Love in Contract (2022), and The Judge from Hell (2024).

== Career ==
Kim first entered the entertainment industry as a model at the suggestion of his father. After completing his military service, which left him feeling uncertain about his future, his father recommended modeling. Before pursuing this path, Kim weighed over 100 kg, but he lost more than 30 kg through weight management during and after his military service. Initially aspiring to be a chef, Kim joined Esteem Academy to train as a model. He debuted in 2010 and gained recognition through various fashion shows and pictorials, including those for Mbio and General Idea.

While modeling, he participated in the tvN survival program Flower Boy Casting: Oh! Boy (2011), where he earned the nickname "Sexy Charisma" and discovered his passion for acting. In 2013, he made his acting debut in the film No Breathing, alongside Seo In-guk and Lee Jong-suk.

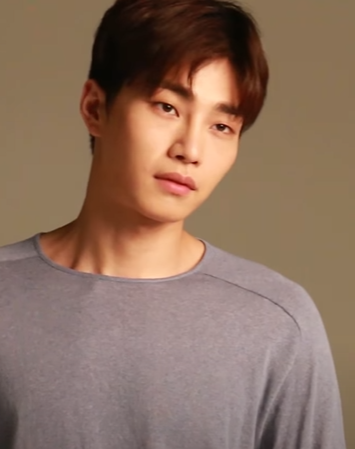
Kim in 2017

Initially, Kim worked as a model at Esteem, but after leaving the agency, he faced about 18 months of unemployment. During this time, he began to seriously consider acting. After Esteem closed down, he had the opportunity to audition for the KBS drama Blade Man, featuring Shin Se-kyung and Lee Dong-wook. While filming this drama without a manager, Esteem reached out to him again. A friend and fellow model, Ahn Jae-hyun introduced him to HB Entertainment, leading to him working with both agencies.

In October 2023, he signed an exclusive contract with Management S, an agency established by his longtime manager.

In 2025, Kim starred opposite Choi Soo-young in the ENA romance drama I Dol I. He played Do Ra-ik, a boy group member.

On November 10, 2026, it was reported that Kim had signed an exclusive contract with Fantagio.

== Filmography ==
=== Film ===
Year	Title	Role	Ref.
2013	No Breathing	Dae-chan	
2016	Derailed	Kang Sung-hoon	
2018	Golden Slumber	Park Goon	
2019	Money	Jun Woo-sung	
2027	The Roundup 5	Lee Kang-tae	

=== Television series ===
Year	Title	Role	Notes	Ref.
2012	Roller Coaster 2			
2014	Blade Man	Je-gil		
2015	Hello Monster	Min Seung-joo		
2015	Yong-pal	Yong Pal 2	Cameo, episode 18	
2016	The Master of Revenge	Go Gil-yong		
2016	Entourage	Himself	Cameo, episode 7	
2017	My Secret Romance	Jung Hyun-tae		
2017	Black	Leo / Kim Woo-sik		
2018	100 Days My Prince	Moo-yeon / Yoon Seok-ha		
2019	Secret Boutique	Yoon Seon-woo		
2019	Beautiful Love, Wonderful Life	Goo Joon-hwi		
2021	Reflection of You	Seo Woo-jae		
2022	Love in Contract	Kang Hae-jin / Kang Yoo-jin		
2023	Sometimes	Lee Joon-pyo	Audio drama, episode 1	
2024	The Judge from Hell	Han Da-on		
2025	When Life Gives You Tangerines	Driver (Cameo)	episode 7	
2025	My Lovely Journey	Lee Yeon-seok		
2025	I Dol I	Do Ra-ik		
2026	Make Me Tingle	Dokgo Dal		

=== Web series ===
Year	Title	Role	Ref.
2016	Beautiology 101	Nam Gung-won	
2017	Brain, Your Choice of Romance	R	
2018	Dear My Room	Seo Min-seok	

=== Television show ===
Year	Title	Role	Ref.
2011	Handsome Casting, Oh! Boy	Contestant	

=== Music video appearances ===
Year	Song title	Artist	Ref.
2011	"Okay, What"	Jewelry S	
2012	"Pandora"	Kara	
2018	"As You Wish"	Urban Zakapa	

== Discography ==
=== Soundtrack appearances ===
List of soundtrack appearances, showing year released, and name of the album
Title	Year	Album
"At Home" (Special Ver.) (with Ryu Hye-young)	2018	Dear My Room OST Part 5

== Awards and nominations ==
Name of the award ceremony, year presented, category, nominee of the award, and the result of the nomination
Award ceremony	Year	Category	Nominee / Work	Result	Ref.
KBS Drama Awards	2019	Best New Actor	Beautiful Love, Wonderful Life	Won	
SBS Drama Awards	2019	Best New Actor	Secret Boutique	Nominated	
SBS Drama Awards	2024	Top Excellence Award, Actor in a Miniseries	The Judge from Hell	Won	
SBS Drama Awards	2024	Best Couple Award (with Park Shin-hye)	The Judge from Hell	Won	
