= Make Me Tingle =

2026 South Korean television series

- Promotional poster
- Hangul: 내가 떨릴 수 있게
- Lit.: So That I Can Tremble
- RR: Naega tteollil su itge
- MR: Naega ttŏllil su itke
- Genre: Coming-of-age; Romantic comedy
- Created by: Kang Eun-kyung; Joo Hyun (Ep. 1-2); Joo Hwa-mi (Ep. 3-present)
- Written by: Ahn Sae-bom; Lee Hwa-jin (Ep. 1-2)
- Directed by: Kim Ye-ji
- Starring: Kim Jae-young; Nam Ji-hyun
- Music by: Kim Joon-seok; Jeong Se-rin
- Country of origin: South Korea
- Original language: Korean
- No. of episodes: 10

Production
- Production companies: KT Studio Genie; GleLine; Studio Icon

Original release
- Network: TVING
- Release: October 15 – November 5, 2026

Make Me Tingle (Korean: 내가 떨릴 수 있게) is a 2026 South Korean romantic comedy television series written by Ahn Sae-bom and directed by Kim Ye-ji. The series follows Gong Yeon-soo (Nam Ji-hyun), a Confucianist from a prominent family, and Dokgo Dal (Kim Jae-young), CEO of a sex toy company, who are set up on a blind date despite their differing views on love. It aired on TVING from October 15, to November 5, 2026, and simultaneously streaming on HBO Max and Rakuten Viki.

== Cast and characters ==
=== Main ===
- Kim Jae-young as Dokgo Dal, the CEO of a sex toy startup
- Nam Ji-hyun as Gong Yeon-soo, a conservative marketer

=== Supporting ===
- Kang Tae-joo as Yoon Ji-oh, the Vice President of the sex toy startup led by Dokgo Dal and also the latter's longtime friend.
- Park So-jin as Jin Se-ra, the CEO of SR Planning and Yeon-soo's best friend.
- Kim Shin-bi as Gong Nam-soo, Yeon-soo's brother who works as a civil servant.
- So Ah-rin as Kang Si-eun, a dance crew member with exceptional talent, center-like visuals and passion for dancing.
- Woo Mi-hwa as Seo Baek-hee

Yeon-soo's and Nam-soo's mother who raised them alone after her husband's death.

- Jeong In-ji as Gong Mi-young

Yeon-soo's and Nam-soo's aunt who is a divorcee.

- Cha Mi-kyung as Min Ja-yeol

Yeon-soo's and Nam-soo's grandmother who is a traditionalist but loving person.

- Jeon Guk-hwan as Yeon-soo's conservative grandfather, the head of the household

=== Special Appearance ===
- Roh Jeong-eui as Lee Yu-ri, Brand Planning at Hyunseong Department Store.

== Production ==
=== Development ===
Make Me Tingle was developed under the working title Nyuneo (뉸어), is created by Kang Eun-kyung and Joo Hwa-mi, written by Ahn Sae-bom, directed by Kim Ye-ji, and produced jointly by KT Studio Genie, GleLine and Studio Icon.

=== Casting and filming ===
In April 2025, Kim Jae-young and Nam Ji-hyun were confirmed to lead the series. Two months later, Kang Tae-joo joined the cast. In February 2026, Nam revealed that she has finished filming the series.

== Release ==
Make Me Tingle was scheduled to premiere on TVING on October 15, 2026, and a simulcast release on HBO Max in selected regions. It also streams on Rakuten Viki.
