= Good Partner =

2024 South Korean television series

- Hangul: 굿파트너
- RR: Gutpateuneo
- MR: Kutp'at'ŭnŏ
- Genre: Legal drama; Workplace
- Written by: Choi Yu-na
- Directed by: Kim Ga-ram
- Starring: Jang Na-ra; Nam Ji-hyun; Kim Jun-han; Pyo Ji-hoon; Ji Seung-hyun; Han Jae-yi; Kim Hye-yoon; Park Hae-jin
- Music by: Gaemi (season 1); Ha Geun-young (season 2)
- Opening theme: "Good Partner" by Hong Dong-pyo
- Country of origin: South Korea
- Original language: Korean
- No. of seasons: 2
- No. of episodes: 18

Production
- Executive producers: Kim Woo-taek; Park Young-soo; Lee Seung-won; Shin Dae-sik
- Producers: Seo Gyun; Shin Yoon-ha; Na Yong-hoon; Jang Young-hye; Kim Soo-hyun
- Cinematography: Hong Seung-hyuk; Lee Jung-cheol
- Editor: Na Hee-soo
- Running time: 70 minutes
- Production companies: Studio&NEW; Studio S

Original release
- Network: SBS TV
- Release: July 12, 2024 – present

Good Partner (Korean: 굿파트너) is an ongoing South Korean legal drama workplace television series written by Choi Yu-na, directed by Kim Ga-ram, and starring Jang Na-ra, Nam Ji-hyun, Kim Jun-han, Pyo Ji-hoon, Ji Seung-hyun, Han Jae-yi, Kim Hye-yoon, and Park Hae-jin. The first season aired on SBS TV from July 12 to September 20, 2024, every Friday and Saturday at 22:00 (KST). It is also available for streaming on Wavve and Netflix in South Korea, and on Viki and Viu in selected regions. In April 2025, a second season was confirmed for production and premiered on November 20, 2026, at 21:50 (KST).

== Synopsis ==
Cha Eun-kyung is a renowned divorce lawyer known for her sharp wit and unwavering dedication to her clients. As she navigates high-profile cases, her own marriage begins to crumble, forcing her to confront her own values and the human cost of her chosen profession. Meanwhile, a newly hired lawyer, Han Yu-ri, challenges Eun-kyung's pragmatic approach with her idealism and passion for justice. Despite their initial clashes, they develop a mentor-mentee relationship, learning from each other's strengths and weaknesses. Through a series of challenging cases, both women grapple with ethical dilemmas, confront personal struggles, and ultimately discover the true meaning of "good partnership" – not just in the courtroom, but also in their personal and professional lives.

== Cast and characters ==
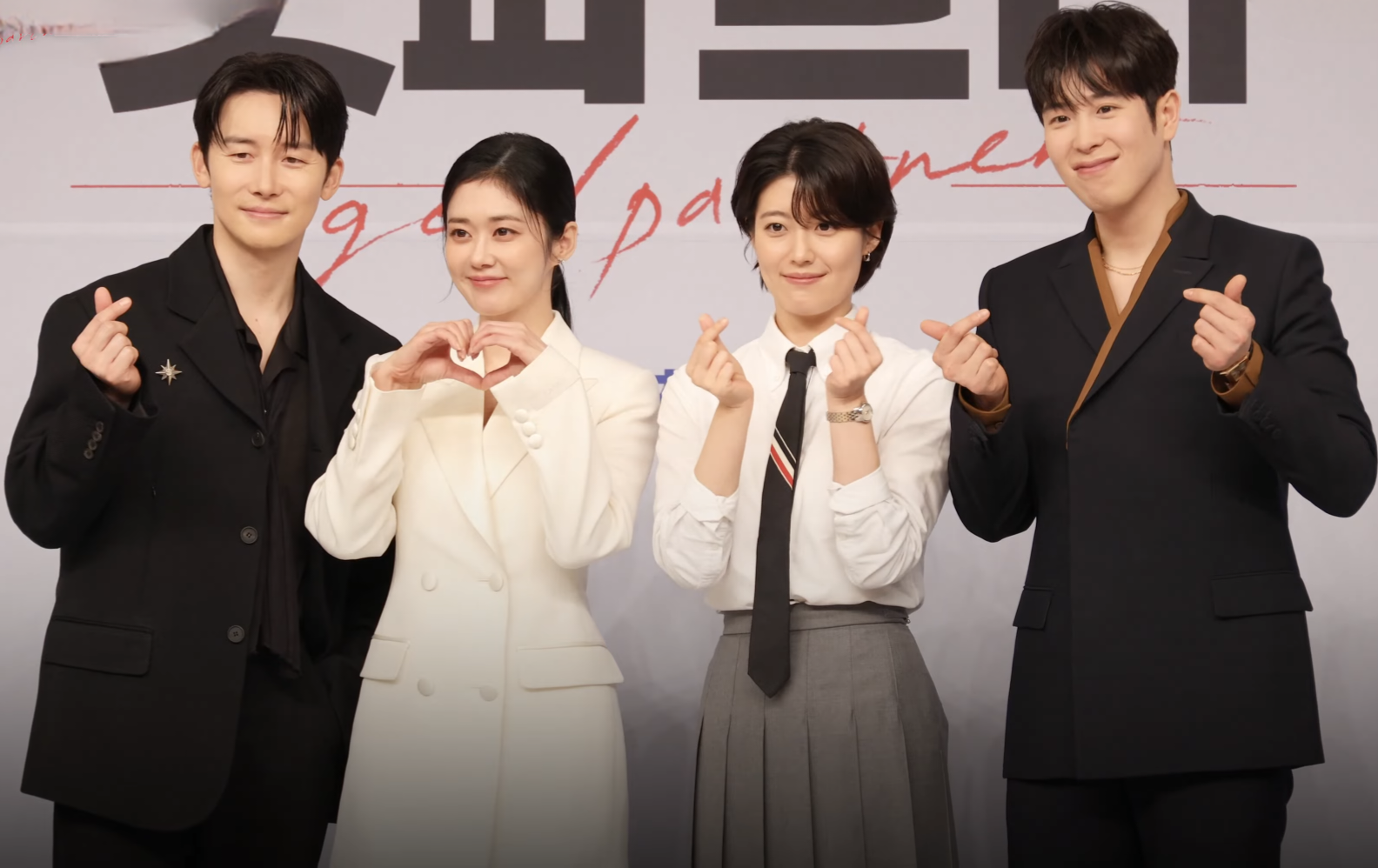
Good Partner main cast at the press conference in July 2024

=== Main ===
- Jang Na-ra as Cha Eun-kyung:
  A veteran divorce lawyer and managing partner at Daejeong Law Firm who later found and lead Libom, a boutique law firm specializing exclusively in divorce. Known for her efficiency-driven and pragmatic approach to legal practice, she prioritizes long-term client welfare and essential solutions over redundant litigation. Having navigated her own divorce, her structured professional life and career face personal and professional evolution across the series as she mentors idealistic rookies, manages workplace friction, and eventually expands her own firm by taking notice of passionate legal talent such as Yu-ri and Hye-sung.
- Nam Ji-hyun as Han Yu-ri (season 1):
  An idealistic rookie lawyer and law school honors graduate who initially aspires to work in corporate law at Daejeong Law Firm. Much to her dismay, she is assigned instead to the firm's divorce team under the mentorship of Eun-kyung. Driven by a strong sense of justice and deep empathy for clients, Yu-ri initially clashes with Eun-kyung's pragmatic and profit-focused approach. However, after discovering Eun-kyung's personal secret and navigating complex domestic disputes together, Yu-ri matures professionally and personally, eventually becoming Eun-kyung's trusted and reliable partner.
- Kim Jun-han as Jung Woo-jin (season 1):
  A partner lawyer at Daejeong Law Firm's Divorce Team 2 and Eun-kyung's longtime colleague and junior. Having trained under Eun-kyung early in his career, he played an instrumental role alongside her in expanding the firm's divorce cases into a dedicated, independent department. Known for his gentle, earnest, and stabilizing demeanor, Woo-jin serves as Eun-kyung's most trusted confidant and a crucial mediator within the firm, often acting as the voice of reason who can temper her blunt approach. Steadfastly loyal, he provides steady support to Eun-kyung and the team through various professional and personal challenges.
- Pyo Ji-hoon as Jeon Eun-ho:
  An associate lawyer who initially started as a rookie at Daejeong Law Firm's Divorce Team 2 and later joins Eun-kyung at Libom. Known for his cheerful disposition, high emotional intelligence, and sociable charm, Eun-ho serves as a vital stabilizing presence and mediator within the firm, often helping bridge communication between Eun-kyung and her staff. Loyal and dedicated, he continues to support Eun-kyung through her career transition while navigating new professional challenges and mentoring incoming legal talent alongside colleagues like Yu-ri.
- Ji Seung-hyun as Kim Ji-san (season 1; supporting season 2):
  Eun-kyung's husband and an internal medicine doctor who also serves as a medical advisor for Daejeong Law Firm. Initially a supportive and devoted spouse who embraced Eun-kyung's career-driven ambition, Ji-sang eventually grows emotionally alienated due to the widening gap between their professional success and the strain on their family life. Following their divorce, he struggles with isolation and a diminished sense of self-worth as he attempts to navigate life outside of Eun-kyung's shadow.
- Han Jae-yi as Choi Sa-ra (season 1):
  A senior legal assistant and manager at Daejeong Law Firm's Divorce Team 1 who has worked as Eun-kyung's secretary for nearly a decade. Having risen through the ranks through tenacity and meticulous dedication, Sa-ra initially viewed Eun-kyung as a professional role model and mentor. However, underlying ambitions for success and a deep-seated inferiority complex eventually lead her into a complex personal and professional betrayal involving Eun-kyung's husband.
- Kim Hye-yoon as Kang Hye-sung (season 2):
  An ambitious associate lawyer at Chunjeong Law Firm with five years of experience handling civil and criminal litigation. Known for her tenacity, sharp judgment, and high success rate, Hye-sung has long aspired to specialize exclusively in divorce law. Eager to prove her capabilities on a larger stage, she crosses paths with Eun-kyung, sparking a professional rivalry and mutual ambition that eventually leads her toward a new path at Libom.
- Park Hae-jin as Park Tae-su (season 2):
  The ambitious managing partner of Taesu Law Firm who utilizes digital media, including his online legal channel, to build a powerful personal brand. Known for his aggressive litigation style, media savvy, and populist approach to client advocacy, Tae-su frequently clashes with Eun-kyung over their opposing legal philosophies. While Eun-kyung values restraint and long-term strategy, Tae-su favors high-stakes, aggressive pressure to secure maximum results, setting up a sharp professional rivalry and ideological conflict in the legal field.

=== Supporting ===
==== Introduced in season 1 ====
- Yuna as Kim Jae-hee (seasons 1–2):
  Eun-kyung and Ji-sang's daughter. Inheriting her mother's sharp intellect and her father's emotional sensitivity, Jae-hee grows up mature and independent despite the strain of her parents' busy careers. Following her parents' divorce and the subsequent changes in her family life, she displays remarkable poise and emotional maturity, deeply understanding both parents and serving as a steady anchor for them as she grows up.
- Jung Jae-sung as Oh Dae-gyu:
  CEO of Daejeong Law Firm. An established figure who capitalized on the legal market during a period when lawyers were scarce, he successfully grew Daejeong into a major firm. Highly protective of the firm's reputation and fiercely guarding his own status and authority, he maintains a traditional, commanding leadership style within the organization.
- Kim Mi-hwa as Manager Ahn:
  A senior secretary at Daejeong Law Firm's Divorce Team 2. As the most experienced staff member in her position, she possesses sharp intuition and serves as a central hub for internal office gossip and information within the firm.
- Seo Jeong-yeon as Kim Kyung-sook:
  Yu-ri's mother. A devoted wife whose life was upended when her husband unexpectedly demanded a divorce while Yu-ri was still in high school. Despite her efforts to preserve the family for her daughter's sake, she ultimately underwent an involuntary divorce. Resilient and deeply affectionate, she maintains a cheerful exterior to shield Yu-ri from her own emotional pain and serves as a steadfast source of support in her daughter's life.
- Jeon Jin-ki as Hong Joon-kyung:
  A veteran presiding judge who is accustomed to a heavy daily courtroom caseload, he maintains a calm demeanor while applying sharp insight and judicial wisdom to domestic disputes.

==== Introduced in season 2 ====
- Cha Yu-jin as Manager Shim:
  The office manager at Libom. Recruited directly by Eun-kyung during the transition to Libom, she is known for her sharp competence and meticulous work ethic.
- Choi Hong-il as Kang Il-joon:
  Hye-sung's devoted father. A hardworking small-business owner who ran a local snack shop to quietly fund his daughter's undergraduate education and law school tuition. He shares a deeply supportive and affectionate relationship with Hye-sung, serving as her primary emotional anchor and steadfast personal ally.
- Ryu Seung-soo as Kim Sang-choon:
  The managing partner of Chunjeong Law Firm. A demanding and exploitative superior who frequently burdens Hye-sung with menial administrative tasks while taking credit for her professional accomplishments, treating her merely as a subordinate to be leveraged for his own benefit.
- Park Joo-hyun as Lee Ha-jung:
  A staff member at Chunjeong Law Firm who recognizes Hye-sung's professional capabilities and serves as a supportive workplace ally.

=== Special appearances ===
- Jang Hyuk-jin as Park Jong-sik: Yu-ri's first client.
- Shim So-young as Kim Eun-hee: Jong-sik's wife.
- Han Jae-yeong as Mr. Kim: A client who made a scene at Daejeong Law Firm.
- Moon Ji-ae as herself: The radio host of Moon Ji-ae's Every Day.
- Yoon Geum-seon-ah as Kim Min-jeong: Min-seok's wife who found out her husband is having an affair with her friend's wife.
- Han Eun-seong as Park Min-seok: Min-jeong's husband and Mi-jin's lover.
- Nam Tae-woo as Kim Joon-hee: Mi-jin's husband who found out his wife is having an affair with his friend's husband.
- Bae Woo-hee as Choi Mi-jin: Joon-hee's wife and Min-seok's mistress.
- Lee Jin-hee as Kim Hee-ra: Myung-jong's mistress.
- Lee Yoon-gun as Han Myung-jong: Yu-ri's estranged father who is having an affair with Hee-ra.
- An Hye-kyeong as the host of Everything About Divorce
- Kim Jung-young as Park Jin-sook:A client seeking an advice whether to divorce his alcoholic husband or not.
- Kim Hak-sun as Kim Jong-bok: Jin-sook's alcoholic husband.
- Kim Beong Choun as Kang Sang-ju: CEO of Kang Sang-ju Law Office and a former high-ranking prosecutor.
- Jung Seok-yong as Jang Hyun-sung: Se-hee's husband.
- Jung Ae-yeun as Kim Se-hee: Hyun-sung' wife.
- Jung Young-joo as Go Yu-sun A woman who filed a divorce but remarried her husband, Chul-min.
- Kwak Ja-hyeong as Yoon Chul-min: Yu-sun's husband.
- Lee Seo-hwan as a judge
- Park Ji-yeon as Choi Hyun-seo
- Go Geon-han as Kim Ho-seok
- Hwang Jung-min as Eun-ho's mother
- Seo Sang-won as Eun-ho's father
- Choi Deok-moon as Park Ji-hwan: A father who learns his son is not his biological child.
- Yoon Sang-hyun as Park Seo-jin: Ji-hwan's son.
- Bae Yoo-ram as Park Chan-sung: Soo-eun's husband and Sun-ah's lover.
- Kim Bo-jung as Oh Soo-eun: Chan-sung's wife who is pregnant and just want a sincere apology from her husband's mistress.
- Ji Ye-eun as Jang Sun-ah: A troublesome client and Chan-sung's mistress.
- Cha Mi-kyung as Lee Soon-rye: A friend of Eun-ho's mother who wants to live as herself and not as a wife or a mother.
- Lee Han-wi as Kim Young-chul: Soon-rye's wife.
- Lee Si-eon as Kim Hoon: A con artist who conspired with her wife, Ha-yoon, to extort alimony through an adultery lawsuit.
- Kim Tae-jeong as Lee Seung-joon: A college student who become a victim of a con artist couple.
- Kim Si-hyun as Kim Ha-yoon: Hoon's wife who is also a con artist and uses dating app to lure men to become her lover then extort money.
- Kwak Si-yang as Chun Hwan-seo: Chairman of Cheon Medical Foundation and Ji-young's abusive husband.
- Park Ah-in as Yoo Ji-young: Hwan-seo's wife, who is a victim of domestic violence.
- Park Jung-hak Chun Doo-young: Hwan-seo's father and the founder of Cheon Medical Foundation
- Lee Duk-hee as Ji-young's mother
- An Se-ho as Cho Young-tae: A prosecutor.
- Joo Si-eun as a field reporter
- Park Myung-shin as Jung Mal-sook: A client who is abuse by her gambling addict husband.
- Kim Young-woong as Kim Chang-seob: Mal-sook's husband who is a gambler.
- Kim Nam-hee as another gambler
- Lee Tae-sung as Choi Jin-hyuk: Sung-hee's husband.
- Shin So-yul as Lee Sung-hee: Jin-hyuk's wife who decides to file for divorce following ongoing conflict with her husband.
- Go Ah-sung as Lee Han-na: The new divorce lawyer of Daejeong Law Firm.
- Son Ji-na as Park Ae-yeon: Dae-gyu's wife and Woo-jin stepmother.

== Production ==
=== Development ===
SBS announced that Good Partner would be part of its 2024 drama lineup. The series is written by Choi Yu-na, a divorce lawyer and writer, who is well known to the public through the divorce empathy Instatoon (Note: Instatoon is a combination of two words: Instagram and Webtoon.) Marriage Red, and directed by Kim Ga-ram, who helmed on The Vampire Detective (2016), Flower Crew: Joseon Marriage Agency (2019), and Nevertheless (2021). Studio&NEW and Studio S co-managed the production.

On April 3, 2025, Studio S confirmed the production of the second season. However, SBS stated that it was still in early production stage, so the broadcast and filming dates as well as cast have not been decided.

=== Casting ===
In January 2024, Jang Na-ra, Nam Ji-hyun, Kim Jun-han, Pyo Ji-hoon, Ji Seung-hyun and Han Jae-yi were confirmed to star in the series. Yuna and Jung Jae-sung also joined the cast.

=== Filming ===
Principal photography began in January 2024.

== Release ==
The first season of Good Partner was confirmed to be broadcast on July 12, 2024, and would air every Friday and Saturday at 22:00 (KST). It is also available to stream on Wavve, Netflix, Viki and Viu. The second season is scheduled to premiere on November 20, 2026, at 21:50 (KST).

== Reception ==
=== Viewership ===
Good Partner : South Korea viewers per episode (millions)

Season	Episode number																Average
Season	1	2	3	4	5	6	7	8	9	10	11	12	13	14	15	16	Average
1	1.349	1.551	1.898	2.524	2.213	2.440	3.431	2.634	3.473	2.765	2.727	2.515	3.007	2.801	3.199	2.829	2.585
2	1.641	1.558	TBD	TBD	TBD	TBD	TBD	TBD	TBD	TBD	TBD	TBD	TBD	TBD	TBD	TBD	TBD

Source: Audience measurement performed nationwide by Nielsen Korea.

Average TV viewership ratings (season 1)
Ep.	Original broadcast date	Average audience share (Nielsen Korea)	
Ep.	Original broadcast date	Nationwide	Seoul
1	July 12, 2024	7.8% (3rd)	8.1% (2nd)
2	July 13, 2024	8.7% (2nd)	8.8% (2nd)
3	July 19, 2024	10.5% (2nd)	10.9% (1st)
4	July 20, 2024	13.7% (2nd)	14.1% (2nd)
5	July 26, 2024	12.1% (2nd)	13.2% (1st)
6	August 16, 2024	13.6% (2nd)	14.3% (2nd)
7	August 17, 2024	17.7% (2nd)	18.7% (1st)
8	August 23, 2024	14.6% (1st)	15.3% (1st)
9	August 24, 2024	17.2% (2nd)	17.8% (1st)
10	August 30, 2024	15.5% (1st)	16.0% (1st)
11	August 31, 2024	15.4% (2nd)	15.7% (2nd)
12	September 6, 2024	14.4% (1st)	14.8% (1st)
13	September 7, 2024	16.3% (2nd)	16.9% (1st)
14	September 13, 2024	15.7% (1st)	16.8% (1st)
15	September 14, 2024	16.7% (2nd)	16.8% (2nd)
16	September 20, 2024	15.2% (1st)	15.7% (1st)
Average		15.7%	14.6%
In the table above, the blue numbers represent the lowest ratings and the red numbers represent the highest ratings.

Average TV viewership ratings (season 2)
Ep.	Original broadcast date	Average audience share (Nielsen Korea)	
Ep.	Original broadcast date	Nationwide	Seoul
1	November 20, 2026	8.4% (2nd)	8.2% (2nd)
2	November 21, 2026	7.7% (2nd)	7.2% (2nd)
3	November 27, 2026		
4	November 28, 2026		
5	December 4, 2026		
6	December 5, 2026		
7	December 11, 2026		
8	December 12, 2026		
9	December 18, 2026		
10	December 19, 2026		
11	December 25, 2026		
12	December 26, 2026		
13	January 1, 2027		
14	January 2, 2027		
15	January 8, 2027		
16	January 9, 2027		
In the table above, the blue numbers represent the lowest ratings and the red numbers represent the highest ratings.; This drama airs on a cable channel/pay TV which normally has a relatively smaller audience compared to free-to-air TV/public broadcasters (KBS, SBS, MBC, and EBS).

=== Awards and nominations ===
Name of the award ceremony, year presented, category, nominee of the award, and the result of the nomination
Award ceremony	Year	Category	Nominee / Work	Result	Ref.
APAN Star Awards	2024	Drama of the Year	Good Partner	Nominated	
APAN Star Awards	2024	Best Screenwriter	Choi Yu-na	Won	
APAN Star Awards	2024	Top Excellence Award, Actress in a Miniseries	Jang Na-ra	Nominated	
APAN Star Awards	2024	Popularity Star Award, Actress	Jang Na-ra	Nominated	
Baeksang Arts Awards	2025	Best Actress	Jang Na-ra	Nominated	
Baeksang Arts Awards	2025	Best Supporting Actor	Kim Jun-han	Nominated	
Baeksang Arts Awards	2025	Best Screenplay	Choi Yu-na	Nominated	
Bechdel Day	2025	Bechdel Choice 10	Good Partner	Placed	
SBS Drama Awards	2024	Grand Prize (Daesang)	Jang Na-ra	Won	
SBS Drama Awards	2024	Top Excellence Award, Actress in a Miniseries	Nam Ji-hyun	Won	
SBS Drama Awards	2024	Excellence Award, Actor in a Miniseries	Kim Jun-han	Won	
SBS Drama Awards	2024	Excellence Award, Actor in a Miniseries	Pyo Ji-hoon	Won	
SBS Drama Awards	2024	Excellence Award, Actress in a Miniseries	Nam Ji-hyun	Nominated	
SBS Drama Awards	2024	Excellence Award, Actress in a Miniseries	Seo Jeong-yeon	Nominated	
SBS Drama Awards	2024	Best Supporting Actor in a Miniseries	Ji Seung-hyun	Won	
SBS Drama Awards	2024	Best Young Actress	Jeon Yu-na	Won	
SBS Drama Awards	2024	Best Supporting Team	Good Partner	Won	
SBS Drama Awards	2024	Best Performance	Han Jae-yi	Won	
