= Jeon Yu-na =

South Korean child actress (born 2011)

- Born: July 18, 2011 (age 15); South Korea
- Occupation: Actress
- Years active: 2018–present
- Agent: Saram

Korean name
- Hangul: 전유나
- RR: Jeon Yuna
- MR: Chŏn Yuna

Jeon Yu-na (Korean: 전유나; born July 18, 2011) is a South Korean child actress. She gained international recognition for her role as the childhood Sunja in Apple TV+ series Pachinko in 2022, and as the genius girl Choi Ro-hee in ENA series The Kidnapping Day in 2023. For her role in The Kidnapping Day, she was awarded the Baeksang Arts Award for Best New Actress in 2024.

== Life and career ==
Jeon was born on July 18, 2011 in Seoul, South Korea. She started acting at a very young age of 5 when she went to a local music academy, when her mom recognized her acting talent. She took some guest and minor roles in several Korean movies and television series such as Juror 8 and Hellbound, before getting international recognition for playing the childhood Sunja in Pachinko. Her role in Pachinko was praised as a delightful performance. She was only 10 years old during the filming, and she was immersed in the character by understanding what the Koreans had experienced during the Japanese colonization. She cast the childhood Sunja character as observant, precocious, and have a lot of curiosity on what happened around her.

After Pachinko, she worked on some other Korean television series such as Green Mother's Club and Secret of the Lightning Cloak, and signed an exclusive contract with Saram Entertainment before auditioning for the role of Choi Ro-hee in The Kidnapping Day. She won the role by overcoming a competition rate of 500 to 1 and surviving 5 rounds of auditions. She was praised for her delicate acting skills that is unusual for a child actress her age and for her ability to maintain a good chemistry with the lead actor, Yoon Kye-sang. Yoon praised her for acting professionally like an adult. Another fellow actress in the drama, Seo Jae-hee, also praised her, stating that Jeon has a pure, lovely, wise and innate personality. For her role in The Kidnapping Day, she was awarded the "Best Child Actress" at the 2023 APAN Star Awards and the "Best New Actress (Television category)" in the 2024 Baeksang Arts Awards.

Between October 8 and November 19, 2023, together with Seol Ga-eun, Jeon played the Suzu role in Sea Village Diary, a theatre play based on a Japanese film called Our Little Sister, directed by Hirokazu Kore-eda.

In 2024, she won the "Best Young Actress" award at the 2024 SBS Drama Awards for her role as Jang Na-ra's daughter in Good Partner.

== Filmography ==
=== Film ===
Year	Title	Role	Ref.
2024	Dirty Money	Kim Ji-min	
2025	The Great Flood	Lee Ji-soo	

=== Television series ===
Year	Title	Role	Notes	Ref.
2021	Hellbound	Sinner's daughter		
2022	Pachinko	Childhood Sunja		
2022	Green Mothers' Club	Oh Sae-bom		
2022	Secret of the Lightning Cloak	Gong Da-hae		
2023	The Kidnapping Day	Choi Ro-hee		
2024	Good Partner	Kim Jae-hee	Season 1	
2026	Doctor X: Mafia in White	Lee Ju-hui		

=== Theatres ===
Year	Title	Role	Ref.
2023	Sea Village Diary	Suzu	

== Awards and nominations ==
Sortable table of awards and nominations received by Jeon Yu-na
Award Ceremony	Year	Category	Nominee(s) / Work(s)	Result	Ref.
APAN Star Awards	2023	Best Child Actress	The Kidnapping Day	Won	
Baeksang Arts Awards	2024	Best New Actress – Television	The Kidnapping Day	Won	
SBS Drama Awards	2024	Best Young Actress	Good Partner	Won	
