= The Kidnapping Day =

2023 South Korean television series

- Promotional poster
- Also known as: The Abduction Day
- Hangul: 유괴의 날
- Hanja: 誘拐의 날
- RR: Yugoeui nal
- MR: Yugoeŭi nal
- Genre: Thriller; Mystery; Black comedy; Action
- Based on: The Kidnapping Day by Jung Hae-yeon
- Written by: Kim Je-young
- Directed by: Park You-young
- Starring: Yoon Kye-sang; Park Sung-hoon; Jeon Yu-na; Kim Shin-rok
- Music by: Movie Closer
- Country of origin: South Korea
- Original language: Korean
- No. of episodes: 12

Production
- Executive producers: Han Sang-jae (CP); Lee Young-hwa
- Producers: Lee Sang-baek; Yoon Jae-soon; Kim Ha-na
- Running time: 60 minutes
- Production companies: AStory; KT Studio Genie

Original release
- Network: ENA
- Release: September 13 – October 25, 2023

The Kidnapping Day (Korean: 유괴의 날) is a 2023 South Korean television series starring Yoon Kye-sang, Park Sung-hoon, Jeon Yu-na, and Kim Shin-rok. It is based on a novel of the same title by writer Jung Hae-yeon. It aired on ENA from September 13 to October 25, 2023, every Wednesday and Thursday at 21:00 (KST). It is also available for streaming on Amazon Prime Video in selected regions.

== Synopsis ==
The series is about the collaboration of a clumsy kidnapper, and a genius girl who has lost her memory.

== Cast ==
=== Main ===
- Yoon Kye-sang as Kim Myung-joon
  - Oh Seung-jun as young Kim Myung-joon

A former judoka and a desperate father who becomes an unlikely kidnapper to raise the necessary funds to pay for his sick daughter's hospital bills, but is unexpectedly pursued as a murder suspect.

- Park Sung-hoon as Park Sang-yoon

A violent crime detective.

- Jeon Yu-na as Choi Ro-hee

An 11-year-old genius girl who has lost her memory.

- Kim Shin-rok as Seo Hye-eun

Myung-joon's ex-wife.

=== Supporting ===
- Kim Sang-ho as Park Cheol-won

An employee of a security company.

- Seo Jae-hee as Mo Eun-seon

A neurosurgeon.

- Kang Young-seok as Jayden

A fund manager.

- Woo Ji-hyun as Choi Taek-gyun

A lawyer.

- Jeong Soon-won as Chae Jung-man

A detective who is the partner of Sang-yoon.

- Go Ha as So Jin-yu

Ro-hee's mother.

- Jeon Kwang-jin as Choi Jin-tae

Ro-hee's father who is the director of Hyegwang Hospital.

- Choi Eun-woo as Kim Hee-ae

Myung-joon and Hye-eun's daughter.

- Kim Dong-won as Ho-young
- Song Jae-ryong as Beonggeoji
- Min Kyung-jin as Gi-sun
- Park Jin-woo as Jung-do
- Kwak Ja-hyung as a police team leader

=== Special appearances ===
- Joo Hyun-young as an employee of a computer parts store (ep. 10)
- Kang Ha-neul as a lawyer (ep. 12)

== Production and release ==
Actress Jeon Yu-na was selected for the role of Choi Ro-hee through an audition with 500 participants.

In May 2023, production company AStory announced that it had signed a license supply contract with Amazon for the overseas broadcasting rights of the series.

== Reception ==
=== Viewership ===
The Kidnapping Day : South Korea viewers per episode (thousands)

Season	Episode number												Average
Season	1	2	3	4	5	6	7	8	9	10	11	12	Average
1	417	321	658	696	798	708	813	925	946	997	953	1178	784

Source: Audience measurement performed nationwide by Nielsen Korea.

Average TV viewership ratings
Ep.	Original broadcast date	Average audience share (Nielsen Korea)	
Ep.	Original broadcast date	Nationwide	Seoul
1	September 13, 2023	1.833% (4th)	1.840% (4th)
2	September 14, 2023	1.450% (5th)	1.445% (5th)
3	September 20, 2023	3.094% (3rd)	2.713% (3rd)
4	September 21, 2023	3.605% (1st)	3.382% (1st)
5	September 27, 2023	3.495% (2nd)	3.452% (3rd)
6	September 28, 2023	3.195% (1st)	3.548% (2nd)
7	October 5, 2023	3.955% (1st)	4.038% (1st)
8	October 11, 2023	4.144% (1st)	4.439% (2nd)
9	October 12, 2023	4.177% (1st)	4.258% (1st)
10	October 18, 2023	4.262% (1st)	4.345% (1st)
11	October 19, 2023	4.269% (1st)	4.522% (1st)
12	October 25, 2023	5.245% (1st)	5.495% (1st)
Average		3.560%	3.623%
In the table above, the blue numbers represent the lowest ratings and the red numbers represent the highest ratings.; This series aired on a cable channel/pay TV which normally has a relatively smaller audience compared to free-to-air TV/public broadcasters (KBS, SBS, MBC and EBS).

=== Accolades ===
Name of the award ceremony, year presented, category, nominee of the award, and the result of the nomination
Award ceremony	Year	Category	Nominee	Result	Ref.
APAN Star Awards	2023	Best Child Actress	Jeon Yu-na	Won	
Baeksang Arts Awards	2024	Best New Actress	Jeon Yu-na	Won	
