= Idol I =

2025 South Korean television series

- Promotional poster
- Hangul: 아이돌아이
- RR: Aidorai
- MR: Aidorai
- Genre: Romantic comedy; Suspense; Mystery; Legal
- Written by: Kim Da-rin
- Directed by: Lee Kwang-young
- Starring: Choi Soo-young; Kim Jae-young
- Music by: Park Se-joon
- Country of origin: South Korea
- Original language: Korean
- No. of episodes: 12

Production
- Running time: 60 minutes
- Production company: AStory

Original release
- Network: ENA; Genie TV
- Release: December 22, 2025 – January 27, 2026

Idol I (Korean: 아이돌아이) is a 2025-26 South Korean television series written by Kim Da-rin, directed by Lee Kwang-young, and starring Choi Soo-young and Kim Jae-young. The series follows Maeng Se-na, a renowned lawyer, as she defends her favorite idol, Do Ra-ik, against a murder charge. It aired on ENA on December 22, 2025, to January 27, 2026, every Monday and Tuesday at 22:00 (KST), and subsequently streaming on Genie TV.

== Synopsis ==
When Maeng Se-na's favorite idol, Do Ra-ik, is wrongly accused of murder, the determined defense lawyer digs deeper, but finds a shocking truth about the man she idolized.

== Cast and characters ==
=== Main ===
- Choi Soo-young as Maeng Se-na
  - Park Sharon as young Se-na

A star lawyer known as the "Villain's Lawyer" who only handles the criminal cases that others don't want. Surprisingly, she's been a huge fan of the Gold Boys group for ten years, and she's fiercely loyal to her favorite member, Do Ra-ik. She meets him as a lawyer when he's accused of murder. She's sure he's innocent and wants to prove it. But as she learns more, she discovers a different side to him.

- Kim Jae-young as Do Ra-ik
  - Heo Jun-seo as teen Ra-ik
  - Kim Hee-seong as young Ra-ik

The visual center and vocalist of Gold Boys who becomes a murder suspect. He hates his sasaeng fan more than anything else in the world. He's tired of living life on others' terms and wants privacy. He's a Gold Boys member who went solo, but changed his mind and wanted to return to the group. Then, tragedy strikes when Woo-seong dies at his place, making him a murder suspect.

- Jung Jae-kwang as Kwak Byung-gyun

A prosecutor from a prestigious legal family, known for being cold-blooded, clashes with his former school rival, Se-na, over the Ra-ik case.

- Choi Hee-jin as Hong Hye-joo

Ra-ik's ex-lover.

- Kim Hyun-jin as Park Chung-jae

Se-na's private investigator.

=== Supporting ===
- Park Jeong-woo as Choi Jae-hee

The drummer of the Gold Boys band.

- Choi Geon as Lee Young-bin

The youngest member of the Gold Boys band.

- Ahn Woo-yeon as Kang Woo-seong

A member of the Gold Boys band, who dies mysteriously, sending shockwaves through the fandom and sparking a tangled investigation.

- Oh Gi-gwang as Youngest detective

The youngest detective with sharp instincts uncovers the truth behind the murder case involving Ra-ik.

== Production ==
The series is planned by KT Studio Genie, directed by Lee Kwang-young, written by Kim Da-rin, and AStory managed the production.

In February 2025, Kim Jae-young and Choi Soo-young were reportedly set to star. On August 6, Choi Soo-young and Kim Jae-young were officially confirmed to star. On August 14, Saram Entertainment announced that Choi Hee-jin had been cast. On August 28, Kim Hyun-jin was confirmed to appear. On September 24, Park Jung-woo's appearance was confirmed.

== Viewership ==
I Dol I : South Korea viewers per episode (thousands)

Season	Episode number												Average
Season	1	2	3	4	5	6	7	8	9	10	11	12	Average
1	458	470	680	558	813	697	785	712	766	631	786	634	666

Source: Audience measurement performed nationwide by Nielsen Korea.

Average TV viewership ratings
Ep.	Original broadcast date	Average audience share (Nielsen Korea)	
Ep.	Original broadcast date	Nationwide	Seoul
1	December 22, 2025	1.891% (2nd)	1.752% (2nd)
2	December 23, 2025	2.260% (2nd)	2.257% (2nd)
3	December 29, 2025	2.938% (2nd)	3.201% (2nd)
4	December 30, 2025	2.667% (2nd)	2.578% (2nd)
5	January 5, 2026	3.486% (2nd)	3.532% (2nd)
6	January 6, 2026	2.828% (2nd)	2.722% (2nd)
7	January 12, 2026	3.209% (2nd)	3.219% (2nd)
8	January 13, 2026	3.077% (2nd)	2.853% (2nd)
9	January 19, 2026	3.233% (2nd)	3.553% (2nd)
10	January 20, 2026	2.644% (2nd)	2.603% (2nd)
11	January 26, 2026	3.443% (2nd)	3.272% (2nd)
12	January 27, 2026	2.750% (2nd)	2.479% (2nd)
Average		2.869%	2.835%
In the table above, the blue numbers represent the lowest ratings and the red numbers represent the highest ratings.; This drama aired on a cable channel/pay TV which normally has a relatively smaller audience compared to free-to-air TV/public broadcasters (KBS, SBS, MBC, and EBS).

== Accolades ==
=== Awards and nominations ===
Awards and nominations
Award ceremony	Year	Category	Nominee	Result	Ref.
SEC Awards	2026	Best Asia Series	I Dol I	Pending	
