= Baeksang Arts Award for Best New Actress – Television =

Annual award

- Awarded for: Best performance by a new actress in a South Korean series
- Country: South Korea
- Presented by: Baeksang Arts Awards
- Most recent winner: Bang Hyo-rin; Aema (2026)
- Website: baeksangartsawards

The Baeksang Arts Award for Best New Actress – Television (Korean: 백상예술대상 TV부문 여자 신인 연기상; RR: Baeksang Yesul Daesang TV Bumun Yeoja Sinin Yeongisang) is an award presented annually at the Baeksang Arts Awards ceremony organised by Ilgan Sports and JTBC Plus, affiliates of JoongAng Ilbo, usually in the second quarter of each year in Seoul.

== Winners and nominees ==
Table key
‡	Indicates the winner

=== 1970s ===
Year	Winner and nominees	Television series	Original title	Role(s)	Network
1974 (10th)	Lee Hyo-chun ‡	Wave	파도	Sun-hee	KBS
1974 (10th)	Kim Young-ae ‡	Queen Min	민비	Queen Min	MBC
1976 (12th)	Oh Mi-yeon ‡	Bride Diary	신부일기	Driver Miss Kim	MBC
1977 (13th)	Go Doo-shim ‡	Purity	정화	Gim Man-deok	MBC
1978 (14th)	Kim Bo-yeon ‡	You	당신	Young-hwa	MBC
1979 (15th)	Kim Yoon-mi ‡	Face of a Woman	여자의 얼굴		TBC

=== 1980s ===
Year	Winner and nominees	Television series	Original title	Role(s)	Network
1980 (16th)	Jung Ae-ri ‡	Set in the Lake Reman	레만호에 지다	Ha Ma-ri	KBS
1981 (17th)	Jung Ae-ri ‡	Dongshimcho	동심초	Cha-nyeo	KBS1
1981 (17th)	Lee Kyung-jin ‡	Daemyung	대명	Ok-hwa	KBS1
1982 (18th)	Lee Hye-sook ‡	Women's History: Jang Hui-bin	여인열전 - 장희빈	Queen Inhyeon	MBC
1983 (19th)	Sunwoo Eun-sook ‡	Flower Carriage	꽃가마		KBS2
1984 (20th)	Kang Soo-yeon ‡	Diary of a High School Student	고교생 일기	Yoo Hyun-soo	KBS1
1985 (21st)	Choi Myung-gil ‡	Bestseller Theater: Looking for a Woman	베스트셀러극장 - 여자를 찾습니다	Mi-yeon	MBC
1986 (22nd)	Choi Sun-ah ‡	Flower Ring	꽃반지	Yeon-boon	KBS2
1986 (22nd)	Heo Yoon-jung ‡	Grass	억새풀	Shin Mi-sook	MBC
1987 (23rd)	Kim Hee-ae ‡	A Woman's Heart	여심	Song Da-young	KBS1
1987 (23rd)	Han Ae-kyung ‡	The Boil	생인손	Maria Pyo	MBC
1988 (24th)	Park Soon-ae ‡	500 Years of Joseon - Queen Inhyeon	조선왕조 오백년 - 인현왕후	Queen Inhyeon	MBC
1988 (24th)	Park Soon-ae ‡	Faces from the City	도시의 얼굴	Da-hye	MBC
1989 (25th)	Yoon Yoo-sun ‡	Land	토지	Song-ae	KBS1

=== 1990s ===
Year	Winner and nominees	Television series	Original title	Role(s)	Network
1990 (26th)	Chae Shi-ra ‡	Giant	거인	Seo Gyung-joo	MBC
1991 (27th)	Jang Seo-hee ‡	That Woman	그 여자	Lee Geon-ok	MBC
1991 (27th)	Oh Yeon-soo ‡	The Dancing Gayageum	춤추는 가얏고	Moo-hee	MBC
1992 (28th)	Lee Jin-ah ‡	Barb	미늘	Yoon Soo-mi	SBS
1992 (28th)	Go Hyun-jung ‡	Love on a Jujube Tree	대추나무 사랑걸렸네	Hwang Mal-sook	KBS1
1993 (29th)	Kwon So-jung ‡	Gwanchon Essay	관촌수필	Ong Jeom	SBS
1993 (29th)	Yoo Ho-jeong ‡	Yesterday's Green Grass	옛날의 금잔디	Yoon Da-hye	KBS1
1994 (30th)	Kim Jung-nan ‡	Tomorrow Love	내일은 사랑	Hwang Jin-sun	KBS2
1994 (30th)	Shim Eun-ha ‡	The Last Match	마지막 승부	Jung Da-seul	MBC
1995 (31st)	Kim Sun-min ‡	Farewell	작별	Kang Da-rim	SBS
1995 (31st)	Shin Eun-kyung ‡	General Hospital	종합병원	Lee Jung-hwa	MBC
1996 (32nd)	Kim Hee-sun ‡	Men of the Bath House	목욕탕집 남자들	Kim Soo-gyung	KBS2
1997 (33rd)	Lee Hye-young ‡	First Love	첫사랑	Park Shin-ja	KBS2
1998 (34th)	Kim Ji-young ‡	You and I	그대 그리고 나	Mi-sook	MBC
1999 (35th)	Myung Se-bin ‡	Purity	순수	Yoon Hye-jin	KBS2

=== 2000s ===
Year	Winner and nominees	Television series	Original title	Role(s)	Network
2000 (36th)	Chae Rim ‡	I'm Still Loving You	사랑해 당신을	Bong Sun-hwa	MBC
2001 (37th)	Ha Ji-won ‡	Secret	비밀	Lee Ji-eun	MBC
2001 (37th)	Song Hye-kyo	Autumn in My Heart	가을동화	Yoon/Choi Eun-suh	KBS2
2002 (38th)	Gong Hyo-jin ‡	Splendid Days	화려한 시절	Jo Yeon-shil	SBS
2002 (38th)	Kim Min-sun	Morning Without Parting	이별 없는 아침	Han Jung-seo	SBS
2002 (38th)	So Yoo-jin	Fox and Cotton Candy	여우와 솜사탕	Ahn Seon-nyeo	MBC
2003 (39th)	Jang Na-ra ‡	Successful Story of a Bright Girl	명랑소녀 성공기	Cha Yang-soon	SBS
2003 (39th)	Kim Jung-hwa	New Nonstop	논스톱	Kim Jung-hwa	MBC
2003 (39th)	Eugene	Loving You	러빙유	Jin Da-rae	KBS2
2004 (40th)	Han Ji-hye ‡	Sweet 18	낭랑18세	Yoon Jung-sook	KBS2
2004 (40th)	Han Ga-in	Yellow Handkerchief	노란 손수건	Jo Sun-joo	KBS1
2004 (40th)	Kim Tae-hee	Stairway to Heaven	천국의 계단	Han Yoo-ri	SBS
2005 (41st)	Lee Da-hae ‡	Heaven's Fate	왕꽃선녀님	Yoon Cho-won / Moon Cho-won	MBC
2005 (41st)	Han Hye-jin	Be Strong, Geum-soon!	굳세어라 금순아	Na Geum-soon	MBC
2005 (41st)	Im Soo-jung	I'm Sorry, I Love You	미안하다, 사랑한다	Song Eun-chae	KBS2
2006 (42nd)	Lee Young-ah ‡	Golden Apple	황금 사과	young Kyung-sook	KBS1
2006 (42nd)	Nam Sang-mi	Sweet Spy	달콤한 스파이	Lee Soon-ae	MBC
2006 (42nd)	Yoon Eun-hye	Princess Hours	궁	Shin Chae-kyeong	MBC
2007 (43rd)	Go Ara ‡	Snow Flower	눈꽃	Yoo Da-mi	SBS
2007 (43rd)	Koo Hye-sun	Hearts of Nineteen	열아홉 순정	Yang Gook-hwa	KBS1
2007 (43rd)	Lee Ha-na	Alone in Love	연애시대	Yoo Ji-ho	SBS
2007 (43rd)	Park Si-yeon	When Spring Comes	꽃피는 봄이 오면	Oh Young-joo	KBS2
2007 (43rd)	Song Ji-hyo	Jumong	주몽	Ye So-ya	MBC
2008 (44th)	Lee Ji-ah ‡	The Legend	태왕사신기	Sujini	MBC
2008 (44th)	Choi Yeo-jin	Golden Bride	황금신부	Ok Ji-young	SBS
2008 (44th)	Park Min-young	I Am Sam	아이엠 샘	Yoo Eun-byul	KBS2
2008 (44th)	Park Shin-hye	Kimcheed Radish Cubes	깍두기	Jang Sa-ya	MBC
2008 (44th)	Yoo In-young	Likeable or Not	미우나 고우나	Bong Soo-ah	KBS1
2009 (45th)	Im Yoon-ah ‡	You Are My Destiny	너는 내 운명	Jang Sae Byuk	KBS1
2009 (45th)	Han Ye-won	On Air	온 에어	Cherry	SBS
2009 (45th)	Hong Ah-reum	My Precious You	내사랑 금지옥엽	Kim Bo-ri	KBS2
2009 (45th)	Lee Yeon-hee	East of Eden	에덴의 동쪽	Gook Young-ran/Grace	MBC
2009 (45th)	Moon Chae-won	Painter of the Wind	바람의 화원	Jung-hyang	SBS

=== 2010s ===
Year	Winner and nominees	Television series	Original title	Role(s)	Network
2010 (46th)	Hwang Jung-eum ‡	High Kick Through the Roof	지붕 뚫고 하이킥	Hwang Jung-eum	MBC
2010 (46th)	Go Ah-sung	Master of Study	공부의 신	Gil Pul-ip	KBS2
2010 (46th)	Lee Min-jung	Smile, You	그대 웃어요	Seo Jung-in	SBS
2010 (46th)	Seo Woo	Tamra, the Island	탐나는 도다	Jang Beo-jin	MBC
2010 (46th)	Shin Se-kyung	High Kick! (season 2)	지붕 뚫고 하이킥	Shin Se-kyung	MBC
2011 (47th)	Yoo In-na ‡	Secret Garden	시크릿 가든	Im Ah-young	SBS
2011 (47th)	Bae Suzy	Dream High	드림하이	Go Hye-mi	KBS2
2011 (47th)	Lee Si-young	Becoming a Billionaire	부자의 탄생	Bu Tae-hee	KBS2
2011 (47th)	Nam Gyu-ri	Life Is Beautiful	인생은 아름다워	Yang Cho-rong	SBS
2011 (47th)	Park Ha-sun	Dong Yi	동이	Queen Inhyeon	MBC
2012 (48th)	Uee ‡	Ojakgyo Family	오작교 형제들	Baek Ja-eun	KBS2
2012 (48th)	Im Soo-hyang	New Tales of Gisaeng	신기생뎐	Dan Sa-ran	SBS
2012 (48th)	Jeong Yu-mi	A Thousand Days' Promise	천일의 약속	Noh Hyang-gi	SBS
2012 (48th)	Kang So-ra	Dream High 2	드림하이2	Shin Hae-sung	KBS2
2012 (48th)	Kim You-jung	Moon Embracing the Sun	해를 품은 달	young Heo Yeon-woo	MBC
2013 (49th)	Jung Eun-ji ‡	Reply 1997	응답하라 1997	Sung Shi-won	tvN
2013 (49th)	Choi Yoon-young	Seoyoung, My Daughter	내 딸 서영이	Choi Ho-jung	KBS2
2013 (49th)	Lee Yu-bi	The Innocent Man	세상 어디에도 없는 착한남자	Kang Choco	KBS2
2013 (49th)	Park Se-young	Faith	신의	Princess Noguk	SBS
2013 (49th)	Yoon Jin-yi	A Gentleman's Dignity	신사의 품격	Im Me Ah-ri	SBS
2014 (50th)	Baek Jin-hee ‡	Empress Ki	기황후	Danashri	MBC
2014 (50th)	Han Groo	One Warm Word	따뜻한 말 한마디	Na Eun-young	SBS
2014 (50th)	Kyung Soo-jin	Eunhui	은희	Kim Eun-hee	KBS2
2014 (50th)	Min Do-hee	Reply 1994	응답하라 1994	Jo Yoon-jin	tvN
2014 (50th)	Son Yeo-eun	Thrice Married Woman	세 번 결혼하는 여자	Han Chae-rin	SBS
2015 (51st)	Go Ah-sung ‡	Heard It Through the Grapevine	풍문으로 들었소	Seo Bom	SBS
2015 (51st)	Baek Ji-yeon	Heard It Through the Grapevine	풍문으로 들었소	Ji Young-ra	SBS
2015 (51st)	Han Sun-hwa	Rosy Lovers	장미빛 연인들	Baek Jang-mi	MBC
2015 (51st)	Kim Seul-gi	Discovery of Love	연애의 발견	Yoon Sol	KBS2
2015 (51st)	Nam Ji-hyun	What Happens to My Family?	가족끼리 왜 이래	Kang Seo-wool	KBS2
2016 (52nd)	Kim Go-eun‡	Cheese in the Trap	치즈 인 더 트랩	Hong Seol	tvN
2016 (52nd)	Lee Hye-ri	Reply 1988	응답하라 1988	Sung Deok-sun/Sung Soo-yeon	tvN
2016 (52nd)	Lee Sung-kyung	Flower of Queen	여왕의 꽃	Kang Yi-sol	MBC
2016 (52nd)	Park So-dam	My First Time	처음이라서	Han Song-yi	OnStyle
2016 (52nd)	Ryu Hye-young	Reply 1988	응답하라 1988	Sung Bo-ra	tvN
2017 (53rd)	Lee Se-young ‡	The Gentlemen of Wolgyesu Tailor Shop	월계수 양복점 신사들	Min Hyo-won	KBS2
2017 (53rd)	Kang Han-na	Moon Lovers: Scarlet Heart Ryeo	달의 연인 - 보보경심 려	Princess Hwangbo Yeon-hwa	SBS
2017 (53rd)	Gong Seung-yeon	The Master of Revenge	마스터 - 국수의 신	Kim Da-hae	KBS2
2017 (53rd)	Bang Min-ah	Beautiful Gong Shim	미녀 공심이	Gong Shim	SBS
2017 (53rd)	Nana	The Good Wife	굿 와이프	Kim Dan	tvN
2018 (54th)	Heo Yool ‡	Mother	마더	Kim Hye-na/Kim Yoon-bok	tvN
2018 (54th)	Kim Da-som	Band of Sisters	언니는 살아있다	Yang Dal-hee / Sera Park	SBS
2018 (54th)	Kim Se-jeong	School 2017	학교 2017	Ra Eun-ho	KBS2
2018 (54th)	Seo Eun-soo	My Golden Life	황금빛 내 인생	Seo Ji-soo	KBS2
2018 (54th)	Won Jin-ah	Rain or Shine	그냥 사랑하는 사이	Ha Moon-soo	JTBC
2019 (55th)	Kim Hye-yoon ‡	Sky Castle	SKY 캐슬	Kang Ye-seo	JTBC
2019 (55th)	Kwon Nara	My Mister	나의 아저씨	Choi Yoo-ra	tvN
2019 (55th)	Park Se-wan	Just Dance	땐뽀걸즈	Kim Shi-eun	KBS2
2019 (55th)	Seol In-ah	Sunny Again Tomorrow	내일도 맑음	Kang Ha-nee	KBS1
2019 (55th)	Lee Seol	Less Than Evil	나쁜 형사	Eun Sun-jae	MBC

=== 2020s ===
Year	Winner and nominees	Television series	Original title	Role(s)	Network
2020 (56th)	Kim Da-mi ‡	Itaewon Class	이태원 클라쓰	Jo Yi-seo	JTBC
2020 (56th)	Jeon Mi-do	Hospital Playlist	슬기로운 의사생활	Chae Song-hwa	tvN
2020 (56th)	Jeon Yeo-been	Be Melodramatic	멜로가 체질	Lee Eun-jung	JTBC
2020 (56th)	Jung Ji-so	The Cursed	방법	Baek So-jin	tvN
2020 (56th)	Han So-hee	The World of the Married	부부의 세계	Yeo Da-kyung	JTBC
2021 (57th)	Park Ju-hyun ‡	Extracurricular	인간수업	Bae Gyu-ri	Netflix
2021 (57th)	Kim Hyun-soo	The Penthouse: War in Life	펜트하우스	Bae Ro-na	SBS
2021 (57th)	Park Gyu-young	Sweet Home	스위트홈	Yoon Ji-soo	Netflix
2021 (57th)	Lee Joo-young	Times	타임즈	Seo Jung-in	OCN
2021 (57th)	Choi Sung-eun	Beyond Evil	괴물	Yoo Jae-yi	JTBC
2022 (58th)	Kim Hye-jun ‡	Inspector Koo	구경이	K / Song Yi-kyung	JTBC
2022 (58th)	Lee Yeon	Juvenile Justice	소년심판	Baek Seong-woo	Netflix
2022 (58th)	Lee Yoo-mi	All of Us Are Dead	지금 우리 학교는	Lee Na-yeon	Netflix
2022 (58th)	Jung Ho-yeon	Squid Game	오징어 게임	Kang Sae-byeok	Netflix
2022 (58th)	Cho Yi-hyun	All of Us Are Dead	지금 우리 학교는	Choi Nam-ra	Netflix
2023 (59th)	Roh Yoon-seo ‡	Crash Course in Romance	일타 스캔들	Nam Hae-yi	tvN
2023 (59th)	Kim Hieora	The Glory	더 글로리	Lee Sa-ra	Netflix
2023 (59th)	Lee Kyung-seong	My Liberation Notes	나의 해방일지	Kwak Hye-suk	JTBC
2023 (59th)	Joo Hyun-young	Extraordinary Attorney Woo	이상한 변호사 우영우	Dong Geu-ra-mi	ENA
2023 (59th)	Ha Yoon-kyung	Extraordinary Attorney Woo	이상한 변호사 우영우	Choi Su-yeon	ENA
2024 (60th)	Jeon Yu-na ‡	The Kidnapping Day	유괴의 날	Choi Ro-hee	ENA
2024 (60th)	Go Youn-jung	Moving	무빙	Jang Hui-soo	Disney+
2024 (60th)	Kim Hyung-seo	The Worst of Evil	최악의 악	Lee Hae-ryeon	Disney+
2024 (60th)	Lee Yi-dam	Daily Dose of Sunshine	정신병동에도 아침이 와요	Min Deul-re	Netflix
2024 (60th)	Lee Han-byeol	Mask Girl	마스크걸	Kim Mo-mi	Netflix
2025 (61st)	Chae Won-bin ‡	Doubt	이토록 친밀한 배신자	Jang Ha-bin	MBC
2025 (61st)	Kim Tae-yeon	When Life Gives You Tangerines	폭싹 속았수다	child Ae-sun	Netflix
2025 (61st)	Roh Jeong-eui	The Witch	마녀	Park Mi-jeong	Channel A
2025 (61st)	Jo Yoon-su	The Tyrant	폭군	Chae Ja-kyung	Disney+
2025 (61st)	Ha Young	The Trauma Code: Heroes on Call	중증외상센터	Cheon Jang-mi	Netflix
2026 (62nd)	Bang Hyo-rin ‡	Aema	애마	Shin Joo-ae	Netflix
2026 (62nd)	Kim Min	Low Life	파인: 촌뜨기들	Park Seon-ja	Disney+
2026 (62nd)	Shin Si-ah	Resident Playbook	언젠가는 슬기로울 전공의생활	Pyo Nam-kyung	tvN
2026 (62nd)	Jeon So-young	Honour	아너 : 그녀들의 법정	Han Min-seo	ENA
2026 (62nd)	Choi Ji-soo	Undercover Miss Hong	언더커버 미쓰홍	Kang Nora / Kang Eun-joo	tvN

== Sources ==
- "Baeksang Arts Awards Nominees and Winners Lists". Naver Movie (in Korean).
- "Baeksang Arts Awards Winners Lists". Baeksang Arts Awards (in Korean).
