= Kim Ki-nam =

Kim Ki-nam or similar may refer to:

- Kim Ki-nam (politician) (1929–2024), North Korean politician
- Kim Ki-nam (footballer, born 1971), South Korean footballer who played for Pohang Steelers, Anyang LG Cheetahs, Bucheon SK
- Kim Ki-nam (footballer, born 1973), South Korean footballer who played for Ulsan Hyundai FC
