= KBS Drama Awards =

South Korea television award

- Current: 2025 KBS Drama Awards
- Awarded for: Excellence in Drama and Television Arts
- Location: Yeouido, Seoul
- Country: South Korea
- Presented by: Korean Broadcasting System
- First award: 1987
- Final award: 2024

Korean name
- Hangul: KBS 연기대상
- Hanja: KBS 演技大賞
- RR: KBS yeongi daesang
- MR: KBS yŏn'gi taesang

The KBS Drama Awards (Korean: KBS 연기대상) is an awards ceremony presented by the Korean Broadcasting System (KBS) for outstanding achievements in Korean dramas aired on its network. It is held annually on 31 December. The highest honor of the ceremony is the "Grand Prize" (대상; daesang), awarded to the best actor or actress of the year.

== Categories ==
- Grand Prize (대상), ceremony's highest honor
- Top Excellence in Acting Award (최우수상)
- Excellence in Acting Award (우수상)
- Best Supporting Actor/Actress (조연상)
- Best New Actor/Actress (신인연기상)
- Best Young Actor/Actress (청소년 연기상)
- Best Actor/Actress in a One-Act/Special/Short Drama (단막극집상)
- PD Award, given to the best actor or actress, as determined by PDs.
- Best Writer (작가상)
- Special Award (특별상)
- Achievement Award (공로상)
- Popularity Award (인기상)
- Netizen Award (네티즌상), given to the actor/actress with the most online votes on KBS' website.
- Best Couple Award (베스트 커플상), given to the best drama couple/s as voted by the registered users of KBS website.

== Grand Prize (Daesang) ==
No.	Year	Winner	Drama
1	1987	Im Dong-jin	Land
2	1988	Ban Hyo-jung	Land
3	1989	Go Doo-shim	Fetters of Love
4	1990	Yu In-chon	Ambitious Times
5	1991	Lee Nak-hoon	Yesterday's Green Grass
6	1992	Oh Hyun-kyung	TV's The Art of War
7	1993	Ha Hee-ra	The Break of Dawn
8	1994	Lee Deok-hwa	Han Myung-hoi
9	1995	Na Moon-hee	Even If the Wind Blows
10	1996	Kang Boo-ja	Men of the Bath House
11	1997	Yoo Dong-geun	Tears of the Dragon
12	1998	Choi Soo-jong	Legendary Ambition
13	1999	Chae Shi-ra	The King and the Queen
14	2000	Kim Yeong-cheol	Taejo Wang Geon
15	2001	Choi Soo-jong	Taejo Wang Geon
16	2002	Yoo Dong-geun	Empress Myeongseong
17	2003	Kim Hye-soo	Royal Story: Jang Hui-bin
18	2004	Go Doo-shim	More Beautiful Than a Flower
19	2005	Kim Myung-min	Immortal Admiral Yi Sun-sin
20	2006	Ha Ji-won	Hwang Jini
21	2007	Choi Soo-jong	Dae Jo-yeong
22	2008	Kim Hye-ja	Mom's Dead Upset
23	2009	Lee Byung-hun	IRIS
24	2010	Jang Hyuk	The Slave Hunters
25	2011	Shin Ha-kyun	Brain
26	2012	Kim Nam-joo	My Husband Got a Family
27	2013	Kim Hye-soo	Queen of the Office
28	2014	Yoo Dong-geun	What Happens to My Family?
29	2015	Kim Soo-hyun	The Producers
29	2015	Go Doo-shim	The Virtual Bride, All About My Mom
30	2016	Song Joong-ki	Descendants of the Sun
30	2016	Song Hye-kyo	Descendants of the Sun
31	2017	Kim Yeong-cheol	My Father is Strange
31	2017	Chun Ho-jin	My Golden Life
32	2018	Yoo Dong-geun	Marry Me Now
32	2018	Kim Myung-min	The Miracle We Met
33	2019	Gong Hyo-jin	When the Camellia Blooms
34	2020	Chun Ho-jin	Once Again
35	2021	Ji Hyun-woo	Young Lady and Gentleman
36	2022	Joo Sang-wook	The King of Tears, Lee Bang-won
36	2022	Lee Seung-gi	The Law Cafe
37	2023	Choi Soo-jong	Korea–Khitan War
38	2024	Lee Soon-jae	Dog Knows Everything

== Achievement Award ==
Year	Winner	Notes
1999	Kang Boo-ja	Actress
2000	Yeo Woon-kay	Actress
2001	Kim In-tae	Actor
2003	Nam Il-woo	Actor
2004	Lee Kyung-ho	Director
2005	Jung Eul-young	Director, Precious Family
2006	Lee Dae-ro	Actor
2007	Yang Geun-seung	Screenwriter, Love on a Jujube Tree
2008	Yoo Chul-joo	Lighting director
2009	Yeo Woon-kay	Actress
2014	Kim Ja-ok	Actress
2017	Kim Young-ae	Actress

== Top Excellence in Acting Award ==
=== Best Actor ===
Year	Winner	Drama
1987	Jung Han-yong	Door of Desire
1988	Kim Sung-gyeom	Sky Sky
1989	Roh Joo-hyun	Bridle of Love
1990	Seo In-seok	Days of the Dynasty, Stepping Stone, TV's The Art of War
1991	Kim Yeong-cheol	The Royal Way
1992	Oh Ji-myung	Older Brother
1993	Kim Jin-tae	The Break of Dawn
1994	Kim Se-yoon	Daughters of a Rich Family
1995	Yoo Dong-geun	Jang Nok-su
1996	Choi Soo-jong	First Love
1997	Kim Mu-saeng	Tears of the Dragon
1997	Seo In-seok	Because I Really
1998	Im Dong-jin	The King and Queen, Paper Crane
1999	Shin Goo	School 1
2000	Park Geun-hyung	Tough Guy's Love
2001	Seo In-seok	Emperor Wang Geon
2002	Bae Yong-joon	Winter Sonata
2002	Kim Sang-joong	The Dawn of the Empire
2003	Cha Seung-won	Bodyguard
2003	Kim Ho-jin	Yellow Handkerchief
2004	Ahn Jae-wook	Oh Feel Young
2005	Choi Soo-jong	Emperor of the Sea
2006	Ryu Soo-young	Seoul 1945
2006	Shin Goo	Hearts of Nineteen
2007	Lee Deok-hwa	Dae Jo-yeong
2008	Song Il-kook	The Kingdom of the Winds
2009	Son Hyun-joo	My Too Perfect Sons
2010	Kim Kap-soo	Cinderella's Stepsister, Sungkyunkwan Scandal, The Slave Hunters
2011	Park Si-hoo	The Princess' Man
2012	Song Joong-ki	The Innocent Man
2012	Yoo Jun-sang	My Husband Got a Family
2013	Ji Sung	Secret Love
2013	Joo Won	Good Doctor
2014	Cho Jae-hyun	Jeong Do-jeon
2015	So Ji-sub	Oh My Venus
2016	Park Shin-yang	My Lawyer, Mr. Jo
2016	Park Bo-gum	Love in the Moonlight
2017	Namkoong Min	Good Manager
2018	Choi Soo-jong	My Only One
2018	Cha Tae-hyun	Matrimonial Chaos
2019	Kang Ha-neul	When the Camellia Blooms
2019	Yoo Jun-sang	Liver or Die
2020	Park In-hwan	Brilliant Heritage
2020	Jeong Bo-seok	Homemade Love Story
2021	Cha Tae-hyun	Police University
2021	Lee Do-hyun	Youth of May
2022	Kang Ha-neul	Curtain Call
2022	Doh Kyung-soo	Bad Prosecutor
2023	Kim Dong-jun	Korea–Khitan War
2023	Rowoon	The Matchmakers

=== Best Actress ===
Year	Winner	Drama
1987	Kim Young-ae	The Beginning of Love
1988	Park Won-sook	The Land
1989	Kim Young-ae	Sunrise, Wang Rong Family
1990	Lee Hwi-hyang	Days of the Dynasty, Ambitious Times
1991	Kim Mi-sook	Women's Time
1992	Jo Min-su	Wind Blowing in the Woods
1993	Kim Young-ok	Wild Chrysanthemum, Love and Farewell
1994	Kim Yoon-kyung	When I Miss You
1995	Ha Hee-ra	A Place in the Sun
1996	Kim Young-ae	Colors, Reporting for Duty, Until We Can Love
1997	Choi Myung-gil	Tears of the Dragon
1997	Yoon Mi-ra	Because I Really
1998	Chae Shi-ra	The King and Queen
1999	Lee Hwi-hyang	Love in 3 Colors
2000	Kim Ja-ok	Rising Sun, Rising Moon, More Than Words Can Say
2001	Lee Mi-yeon	Empress Myeongseong
2002	Choi Ji-woo	Winter Sonata
2002	Choi Myung-gil	Empress Myeongseong
2003	Lee Tae-ran	Yellow Handkerchief
2003	Yoo Ho-jeong	Rosemary
2004	Chae Shi-ra	Terms of Endearment
2004	Oh Yeon-soo	A Second Proposal
2004	Song Hye-kyo	Full House
2005	Choi Jin-sil	My Rosy Life
2005	Kim Hae-sook	My Rosy Life
2006	Lee Tae-ran	Famous Princesses
2007	Chae Rim	Dal-ja's Spring
2007	Kim Hyun-joo	In-soon Is Pretty
2008	Kim Ji-soo	Women of the Sun
2009	Chae Shi-ra	Empress Cheonchu
2010	Jeon In-hwa	Bread, Love and Dreams
2010	Moon Geun-young	Cinderella's Stepsister
2011	Moon Chae-won	The Princess' Man
2012	Moon Chae-won	The Innocent Man
2013	Hwang Jung-eum	Secret Love
2014	Kim Hyun-joo	What's With This Family
2015	Chae Shi-ra	Unkind Ladies
2016	Kim Ha-neul	On the Way to the Airport
2017	Lee Yoo-ri	My Father is Strange
2017	Jung Ryeo-won	Witch at Court
2018	Chang Mi-hee	Marry Me Now?
2018	Cha Hwa-yeon	My Only One
2019	Cho Yeo-jeong	Woman of 9.9 Billion
2019	Shin Hye-sun	Angel's Last Mission: Love
2020	Lee Min-jung	Once Again
2021	Kim So-hyun	River Where the Moon Rises
2021	Park Eun-bin	The King's Affection
2022	Ha Ji-won	Curtain Call
2022	Park Jin-hee	The King of Tears, Lee Bang-won
2023	Uee	Live Your Own Life

== Excellence in Acting Award ==
=== Best Actor in a Miniseries ===
Year	Winner	Drama
2007	Kang Ji-hwan	Capital Scandal
2008	Jung Jin-young	The Kingdom of the Winds
2009	Ji Jin-hee	He Who Can't Marry
2010	Kim Soo-ro	Master of Study
2011	Choi Daniel	Baby Faced Beauty
2011	Jung Jin-young	Brain
2012	Shin Hyun-joon	Ohlala Couple
2013	Oh Ji-ho	Queen of the Office
2014	Eric Mun	Discovery of Love
2015	Cha Tae-hyun	The Producers
2016	Lee Sang-yoon	On the Way to the Airport
2017	Park Seo-joon	Fight for My Way
2018	Jang Dong-gun	Suits
2018	Choi Daniel	Jugglers, The Ghost Detective
2019	Choi Won-young	Doctor Prisoner
2019	Jang Dong-yoon	The Tale of Nokdu
2020	Park Sung-hoon	Into The Ring
2020	Lee Jae-wook	Do Do Sol Sol La La Sol
2021	Jung Yong-hwa	Sell Your Haunted House
2021	Kim Min-jae	Dali & Cocky Prince
2022	Lee Joon	Bloody Heart
2023	Jang Dong-yoon	Oasis
2024	Park Ji-Hoon	Love Song For Illusion

=== Best Actress in a Miniseries ===
Year	Winner	Drama
2007	Han Ji-min	Capital Scandal
2007	Lee Da-hae	Hello! Miss
2008	Lee Ha-na	Women of the Sun
2009	Kim Ah-joong	The Accidental Couple
2010	Han Eun-jung	Grudge: The Revolt of Gumiho
2011	Jang Na-ra	Baby Faced Beauty
2012	Jang Na-ra	School 2013
2013	Im Yoona	Prime Minister and I
2014	Jung Yu-mi	Discovery of Love
2015	Shin Min-a	Oh My Venus
2016	Kim Ji-won	Descendants of the Sun
2017	Kim Ji-won	Fight for My Way
2017	Jang Na-ra	Confession Couple
2018	Baek Jin-hee	Jugglers, Feel Good to Die
2019	Kim So-hyun	The Tale of Nokdu
2019	Nana	Justice
2020	Nana	Into The Ring
2020	Cho Yeo-jeong	Cheat on Me, If You Can
2021	Go Min-si	Youth of May
2021	Kwon Nara	Royal Secret Agent
2022	Kang Han-na	Bloody Heart
2022	Lee Hye-ri	Moonshine
2023	Cho Yi-hyun	The Matchmakers
2023	Seol In-ah	Oasis
2024	Yeonwoo	Dog Knows Everything
2024	Han Ji-hyeon	Face Me
2025	Jung Ji-so	Who Is She
2025	Seohyun	The First Night with the Duke

=== Best Actor in a Mid-length Drama ===
Year	Winner	Drama
2009	Jung Joon-ho	IRIS
2009	Kim Seung-woo	IRIS
2010	Oh Ji-ho	The Slave Hunters
2011	Chun Jung-myung	Glory Jane
2012	Uhm Tae-woong	Man from the Equator
2013	Joo Sang-wook	Good Doctor
2014	Lee Joon-gi	Gunman in Joseon
2015	Jang Hyuk	The Merchant: Gaekju 2015
2016	Song Il-kook	Jang Yeong-sil
2017	Lee Dong-gun	Queen for Seven Days
2017	Lee Jun-ho	Good Manager
2018	Seo Kang-joon	Are You Human?
2019	Kim Ji-seok	When the Camellia Blooms
2019	Choi Si-won	My Fellow Citizens!

=== Best Actress in a Mid-length Drama ===
Year	Winner	Drama
2009	Kim Tae-hee	IRIS
2009	Ku Hye-sun	Boys Over Flowers
2010	Park Min-young	Sungkyunkwan Scandal
2011	Park Min-young	Glory Jane
2011	Hong Soo-hyun	The Princess' Man
2012	Lee Bo-young	Man from the Equator
2013	Moon Chae-won	Good Doctor
2014	Nam Sang-mi	Gunman in Joseon
2014	Park Min-young	Healer
2015	Kim Min-jung	The Merchant: Gaekju 2015
2016	Kim Yoo-jung	Love in the Moonlight
2017	Cho Yeo-jeong	Ms. Perfect
2018	Ra Mi-ran	The Miracle We Met
2019	Lee Jung-eun	When the Camellia Blooms
2019	Lee Si-young	Liver or Die

=== Best Actor in a Serial Drama ===
Year	Winner	Drama
2007	Jang Hyun-sung	Daughters-in-Law
2008	Lee Won-jong	The Great King, Sejong
2009	Kim Suk-hoon	Empress Cheonchu
2010	Yoon Shi-yoon	Bread, Love and Dreams
2011	Lee Tae-gon	Gwanggaeto, The Great Conqueror
2012	Joo Won	Bridal Mask
2013	Jo Jung-suk	You Are the Best!
2013	Jo Sung-ha	Wang's Family
2014	Kim Sang-kyung	What's With This Family
2014	Park Yeong-gyu	Jeong Do-jeon
2015	Kim Tae-woo	The Jingbirok: A Memoir of Imjin War
2015	Kim Kap-soo	All About My Mom
2016	Ahn Jae-wook	Five Enough
2016	Lee Dong-gun	The Gentlemen of Wolgyesu Tailor Shop
2017	Park Si-hoo	My Golden Life
2018	Lee Sang-woo	Marry Me Now
2018	Lee Jang-woo	My Only One
2019	Ki Tae-young	Mother of Mine
2019	Oh Min-suk	Beautiful Love, Wonderful Life
2020	Lee Sang-yeob	Once Again
2020	Lee Jang-woo	Homemade Love Story
2021	Yoon Joo-sang	Revolutionary Sisters
2022	Yoon Shi-yoon	It's Beautiful Now
2022	Lim Ju-hwan	Three Bold Siblings
2023	Ha Jun	Live Your Own Life
2023	Ji Seung-hyun	Korea–Khitan War

=== Best Actress in a Serial Drama ===
Year	Winner	Drama
2007	Yoon Jung-hee	A Happy Woman
2008	Lee Yoon-ji	The Great King, Sejong
2009	Yoo Sun	My Too Perfect Sons
2010	Eugene	Bread, Love and Dreams
2011	Kim Ja-ok	Ojakgyo Family
2012	Youn Yuh-jung	My Husband Got a Family
2013	Lee Mi-sook	You Are the Best!
2013	Lee Tae-ran	Wang's Family
2014	Kim Ji-ho	Wonderful Days
2015	Eugene	All About My Mom
2016	So Yoo-jin	Five Enough
2016	Jo Yoon-hee	The Gentlemen of Wolgyesu Tailor Shop
2017	Shin Hye-sun	My Golden Life
2018	Han Ji-hye	Marry Me Now
2018	Uee	My Only One
2019	Kim So-yeon	Mother of Mine
2019	Seol In-ah	Beautiful Love, Wonderful Life
2020	Lee Jung-eun	Once Again
2020	Jin Ki-joo	Homemade Love Story
2021	Hong Eun-hee	Revolutionary Sisters
2021	Park Ha-na	Young Lady and Gentleman
2022	Lee Ha-na	Three Bold Siblings
2022	Park Ji-young	It's Beautiful Now
2023	Baek Jin-hee	The Real Has Come!

=== Best Actor in a Daily Drama ===
Year	Winner	Drama
2007	Park Hae-jin	Heaven & Earth
2008	Lee Pil-mo	You Are My Destiny
2009	Oh Man-seok	Jolly Widows
2010	amar ibrahim	Marry Me, Please
2011	Ji Chang-wook	Smile Again
2012	Kim Yeong-cheol	The Moon and Stars for You
2012	Kim Dong-wan	Cheer Up, Mr Kim
2013	Kim Suk-hoon	Ruby Ring
2014	Choi Jae-sung	Single-minded Dandelion
2015	Im Ho	The Stars Are Shining
2015	Kwak Si-yang	All Is Well
2016	Oh Min-suk	Secrets of Women
2017	Kim Seung-soo	First Love Again
2017	Song Chang-eui	The Secret of My Love
2018	Kang Eun-tak	Love to the End
2018	Park Yoon-jae	It's My Life
2019	Kim Jin-woo	Left-Handed Wife
2019	Seol Jung-hwan	Unasked Family
2020	Kang Eun-tak	A Man in a Veil
2020	Kim Yu-seok	No Matter What
2021	Ryu Jin	Be My Dream Family
2022	Yang Byung-yeol	Bravo, My Life
2022	Baek Sung-hyun	The Love in Your Eyes
2023	Seo Jun-young	Apple of My Eye [ko]
2023	Lee Shi-kang [ko]	The Elegant Empire

=== Best Actress in a Daily Drama ===
Year	Winner	Drama
2007	Han Ji-hye	Likeable or Not
2008	Kim Jung-nan	You Are My Destiny
2009	Jo An	Jolly Widows
2010	Kim Ji-young	Marry Me, Please
2011	Do Ji-won	Smile Again
2012	Kim Ye-ryeong	TV Novel: Love, My Love
2012	Seo Ji-hye	The Moon and Stars for You
2013	Lee So-yeon	Ruby Ring
2014	Choi Yoon-young	My Dear Cat
2014	Shin So-yul	Love & Secret
2015	Han Chae-ah	You Are the Only One
2015	Kang Byul	Save the Family
2016	Lee Yoo-ri	The Promise
2016	So Yi-hyun	Secrets of Women
2017	Myung Se-bin	First Love Again
2017	Im Soo-hyang	Lovers in Bloom
2018	Ha Hee-ra	Lady Cha Dal-rae's Lover
2018	Park Ha-na	Mysterious Personal Shopper
2019	Cha Ye-ryun	Gracious Revenge
2019	Lee Young-eun	Home for Summer
2020	Park Ha-na	Fatal Promise
2020	Lee Chae-young	Man in a Veil
2021	Han Da-gam	The All-Round Wife
2021	So Yi-hyun	Red Shoes
2022	Park Ha-na	Vengeance of the Bride
2022	Cha Ye-ryun	Gold Mask
2023	Choi Yoon-young	Woman in a Veil
2023	Nam Sang-ji	Unpredictable Family

=== Best Actor in a One-Act/Special/Short Drama ===
Year	Winner	Drama
2003	Kim In-kwon	Drama City
2003	Namkoong Min	Drama City "To William"
2004	Byun Hee-bong	Drama City "봉메골 산삼소동"
2004	Uhm Tae-woong	Drama City "Blue Skies of Jeju Island"
2005	Park Geun-hyung	Becoming a Popular Song
2005	Jang Hyun-sung	Drama City "Leslie Cheung Is Dead?"
2006	Jung Eun-pyo	Drama City "Blockhead's Quadratic Equation"
2006	Lee Won-jong	HDTV Literature "Bad Story"
2007	Park In-hwan	Drama City "Ugly You"
2008	Yoon Hee-seok	HDTV Literature "Spring, Spring Spring"
2009	Kim Kyu-chul	Korean Ghost Stories "The Grudge Island"
2010	Lee Sun-kyun	Drama Special "Our Slightly Risque Relationship"
2010	Son Hyun-joo	Drama Special "Texas Hit"
2011	Choi Soo-jong	Drama Special "For My Son"
2011	Lee Hee-joon	Drama Special "Perfect Spy"
2012	Sung Joon	Drama Special "Swamp Ecology Report"
2012	Yeon Woo-jin	Drama Special "Just an Ordinary Love Story"
2013	Choi Daniel	Drama Special "Waiting for Love"
2013	Yu Oh-seong	Drama Special "The Devil Rider" / "Mother's Island"
2014	Jo Dal-hwan	Drama Special "Repulsive Love"
2015	Bong Tae-gyu	Drama Special "Trains Don't Stop at Noryangjin Station"
2016	Kim Sung-oh	Becky's Back
2016	Lee Dong-hwi	Drama Special "Red Teacher"
2017	Yeo Hoe-hyun	Girls' Generation 1979
2018	Jang Dong-yoon	Just Dance
2018	Yoon Park	The Tuna and the Dolphin
2019	Jung Dong-hwan	Drama Special "Live Like That"
2019	Lee Do-hyun	Drama Special "Scouting Report"
2020	Lee Shin-young	How to Buy a Friend
2020	Lee Han-wi	Drama Special

=== Best Actress in a One-Act/Special/Short Drama ===
Year	Winner	Drama
2003	Kim Yong-rim	Wedding Gift
2003	Yoon Hye-kyung	Drama City
2004	Han Ji-min	Drama City "Déjà vu"
2004	Min Ji-ah	Drama City "Blue Skies of Jeju Island"
2005	Hong Soo-hyun	HDTV Literature "The Outdoor Lamp"
2005	Youn Yuh-jung	Becoming a Popular Song
2006	Jeon Hye-jin	Drama City "She's Smiling" / "Memories"
2006	Go Jung-min	Chuseok Special "A Farewell to Arms"
2007	Jeon Ye-seo	Drama City "A Death Messenger With Amnesia"
2007	Yoo In-young	Drama City "Cho Yong-pil in Our Memories"
2008	Park Min-young	Korean Ghost Stories "Gumiho (Nine-tailed Fox)"
2009	Kim Sung-eun	Korean Ghost Stories "The Forbidden Book"
2010	Jung Yu-mi	Drama Special "The Great Gye Choon-bin"
2011	Han Eun-jung	Drama Special "400-year-old Dream"
2011	Eugene	Drama Special "Princess Hwapyung's Weight Loss"
2012	Yoo Da-in	Drama Special "Just an Ordinary Love Story"
2012	Park Shin-hye	Drama Special "Don't Worry, I'm a Ghost"
2013	BoA	Drama Special "Waiting for Love"
2013	Han Ye-ri	Drama Special "Yeon-woo's Summer"
2014	Kim So-hyun	Drama Special "We All Cry Differently"
2015	Kim Young-ok	Snowy Road
2015	Lee Ha-na	Drama Special "Fake Family"
2016	Kang Ye-won	Becky's Back
2016	Cho Yeo-jeong	Babysitter
2017	Ra Mi-ran	Drama Special "Madame Jung's Last Week"
2018	Lee Seol	After the Rain
2018	Lee Il-hwa	Mother's Third Marriage
2019	Jo Soo-min	Birthday Letter
2019	Lee Joo-young	Drama Special "Home Sweet Home"
2020	Son Suk	Drama Special
2020	Lee Yoo-young	Drama Special

=== Best Actor in Drama Special/TV Cinema ===
Year	Winner	Drama
2021	Park Sung-hoon	Hee-soo
2022	Cha Hak-yeon	The Stains
2023	Lee Jae-won	No Path Back

=== Best Actress in Drama Special/TV Cinema ===
Year	Winner	Drama
2021	Jeon So-min	Hee-soo
2021	Kim Sae-ron	The Palace
2022	Shin Eun-soo	Like Otters
2023	Chae Won-bin	Love Attack
2023	Hong Seung-hee	Behind the Shadows

== Supporting Awards ==
=== Best Supporting Actor ===
Year	Winner	Drama
1996	Son Hyun-joo	Color - White, First Love
1997	Seon Dong-hyuk	Tears of the Dragon
1997	Song Kyung-chul	A Bluebird Has It
2000	Hong Hak-pyo	More Than Words Can Say
2000	Kim Hak-cheol	Emperor Wang Geon
2001	Jung Tae-woo	Emperor Wang Geon
2001	Kim Sung-hwan	Empress Myeongseong
2002	Son Hyun-joo	To Be With You
2003	Ahn Jung-hoon	One Million Roses
2003	Sunwoo Jae-duk	One Million Roses
2004	Kim Heung-soo	More Beautiful Than a Flower
2004	Oh Ji-ho	A Second Proposal
2005	Ahn Suk-hwan	Bizarre Bunch, Sassy Girl Chun-hyang
2005	Park Chul-min	Immortal Admiral Yi Sun-sin
2006	Lee Han-wi	Hearts of Nineteen, Spring Waltz
2006	Park Sang-myun	Seoul 1945
2007	Im Hyuk	Dae Jo-yeong
2007	Lee Pil-mo	Daughters-in-Law
2008	Kim Yong-gun	Mom's Dead Upset
2008	Um Ki-joon	The World That They Live In
2009	Choi Cheol-ho	Empress Cheonchu
2009	Yoon Joo-sang	My Too Perfect Sons, IRIS
2010	Sung Dong-il	The Slave Hunters, The Fugitive: Plan B
2011	Jung Woong-in	Ojakgyo Family
2012	Kim Sang-ho	My Husband Got a Family
2012	Park Ki-woong	Bridal Mask
2013	Bae Soo-bin	Secret Love
2014	Shin Sung-rok	The King's Face
2015	Park Bo-gum	Hello Monster
2015	Kim Kyu-chul	The Merchant: Gaekju 2015, The Jingbirok: A Memoir of Imjin War
2016	Lee Jun-hyeok	Love in the Moonlight
2017	Kim Sung-oh	Fight for My Way
2017	Choi Won-young	Mad Dog
2018	Kim Won-hae	The Ghost Detective, Are You Human?
2018	In Gyo-jin	Feel Good to Die
2019	Jung Woong-in	Woman of 9.9 Billion
2019	Kim Byung-chul	Doctor Prisoner
2019	Oh Jung-se	When the Camellia Blooms
2020	Ahn Gil-kang	Into The Ring
2020	Oh Dae-hwan	Once Again
2021	Choi Dae-chul	Revolutionary Sisters
2021	Lee Yi-kyung	Royal Secret Agent
2022	Sung Dong-il	Curtain Call, If You Wish Upon Me
2022	Heo Sung-tae	Bloody Heart
2023	Jo Han-chul	The Matchmakers
2023	Kim Myung-soo [ko]	Oasis
2023	Lee Won-jong	Korea–Khitan War

=== Best Supporting Actress ===
Year	Winner	Drama
1996	Song Chae-hwan	First Love
1997	Yang Geum-seok	A Bluebird Has It
2000	Kim Hae-sook	Autumn in My Heart
2000	Yang Hee-kyung	School 3
2000	Yang Mi-kyung	School 3
2001	Choi Ran	This Is Love
2001	Kim Bo-mi	Empress Myeongseong
2002	Kim Sung-ryung	Empress Myeongseong
2002	Lee Ja-young	To Be With You
2003	Hong Soo-hyun	Sang Doo! Let's Go to School
2003	Jo Yang-ja	Empress Myeongseong
2004	Heo Young-ran	A Second Proposal
2004	Kim Hae-sook	Oh Feel Young
2005	Kim Ji-young	My Rosy Life
2005	Kim Sa-rang	A Love to Kill
2006	Jeon Mi-seon	Hwang Jini
2006	Wang Bit-na	Hwang Jini
2007	Han Go-eun	Capital Scandal
2007	Kim Hye-ok	Daughters-in-Law
2008	Bae Jong-ok	The World That They Live In
2009	Moon Jeong-hee	Empress Cheonchu
2010	Lee Bo-hee	Three Brothers
2011	Park Jung-ah	Smile Again
2011	Lee Yoon-ji	Dream High
2012	Jo Yoon-hee	My Husband Got a Family
2013	Lee Da-hee	Secret Love
2014	Han Eun-jung	Golden Cross
2014	Lee Chae-young	Two Mothers
2015	Kim Seo-hyung	Assembly
2015	Uhm Hyun-kyung	House of Bluebird
2016	Ra Mi-ran	The Gentlemen of Wolgyesu Tailor Shop
2017	Lee Il-hwa	Good Manager, Witch at Court
2017	Jung Hye-sung	Good Manager, Manhole
2018	Kim Hyun-sook	Queen of Mystery 2, Are You Human?
2018	Yoon Jin-yi	My Only One
2019	Ha Jae-sook	Perfume
2019	Kim Jung-nan	Doctor Prisoner
2019	Shin Dong-mi	Liver or Die
2019	Yeom Hye-ran	When the Camellia Blooms
2020	Ye Ji-won	Do Do Sol Sol La La Sol
2020	Kim Sun-young	Homemade Love Story
2020	Oh Yoon-ah	Once Again
2021	Hahm Eun-jung	Be My Dream Family
2021	Keum Sae-rok	Youth of May
2022	Ye Ji-won	The King of Tears, Lee Bang-won
2022	Park Ji-yeon	Bloody Heart
2023	Kang Kyung-hun	Behind the Shadows, Oasis

== Newcomer Awards ==
=== Best New Actor ===
Year	Winner	Drama
1987	Jeong Bo-seok	Samogok
1988	Yoon Seung-won	The Land
1989	Park Jin-sung	Jirisan
1990	Choi Min-sik	Ambitious Times
1990	Jung Seung-ho	Stay with Me
1991	Byun Young-hoon	3 Days' Promise
1992	Lee Byung-hun	Sun Terrace, A Farewell Morning, Tomorrow Love
1993	Kim Kyu-chul	When I Miss You, Good Morning, Yeong-dong
1994	Kim Ho-jin	Police, Please Endure Sunday
1994	Lee Se-chang	Daughters of a Rich Family
1995	Bae Yong-joon	A Sunny Place of the Young
1995	Hong Kyung-in	A Sunny Place of the Young
1996	Ryu Si-won	Until We Can Love
1997	Lee Sang-in	A Bluebird Has It
1998	Lee Sung-jae	Lie
1999	Ryu Jin	Love in 3 Colors, Rising Sun, Rising Moon
1999	Won Bin	Ad Madness
2000	Joo Jin-mo	Look Back in Anger
2000	Park Gwang-hyun	RNA, School 3
2001	Ahn Jae-hwan	This Is Love
2001	Lee Kwang-ki	Emperor Wang Geon
2002	Song Il-kook	Album of Life
2003	Rain	Sang Doo! Let's Go to School
2003	Yeon Jung-hoon	Yellow Handkerchief
2004	Lee Wan	Snow White: Taste Sweet Love
2005	Go Joo-won	Bizarre Bunch, Resurrection
2005	Jae Hee	Sassy Girl Chun-hyang
2005	Kim Dong-wan	A Farewell to Sorrow
2006	Oh Man-seok	The Vineyard Man
2006	Park Hae-jin	Famous Princesses
2006	Seo Ji-seok	Hearts of Nineteen
2007	Kim Ji-hoon	Daughters-in-Law
2007	Kim Ji-seok	Likeable or Not
2008	Jung Gyu-woon	Women of the Sun
2009	Lee Min-ho	Boys Over Flowers
2010	Park Yoochun	Sungkyunkwan Scandal
2011	Kim Soo-hyun	Dream High
2011	Lee Jang-woo	Smile Again, Glory Jane
2011	Joo Won	Ojakgyo Family
2012	Lee Hee-joon	My Husband Got a Family, Jeon Woo-chi
2012	Lee Jong-suk	School 2013
2013	Jung Woo	You Are the Best!
2013	Han Joo-wan	Wang's Family, Drama Special "Yeon-woo's Summer"
2014	Park Hyung-sik	What's With This Family
2014	Seo In-guk	The King's Face
2015	Yeo Jin-goo	Orange Marmalade
2016	Sung Hoon	Five Enough
2016	Jinyoung	Love in the Moonlight
2017	Ahn Jae-hong	Fight for My Way
2017	Woo Do-hwan	Mad Dog
2018	Park Sung-hoon	My Only One
2018	Kim Kwon	Marry Me Now
2019	Kang Tae-oh	The Tale of Nokdu
2019	Kim Jae-young	Beautiful Love, Wonderful Life
2019	Kim Myung-soo	Angel's Last Mission: Love
2020	Lee Sang-yi	Once Again
2020	Seo Ji-hoon	Welcome, Men Are Men
2021	Kim Yo-han	School 2021
2021	Na In-woo	River Where the Moon Rises
2021	Rowoon	The King's Affection
2022	Byeon Woo-seok	Moonshine
2022	Lee You-jin	Three Bold Siblings
2022	Chae Jong-hyeop	Love All Play
2023	Lee Won-jung	My Perfect Stranger
2023	Choo Young-woo	Oasis
2024	Park Sang-nam	My Merry Marriage
2024	Seo Bum-june	Nothing Uncovered

=== Best New Actress ===
Year	Winner	Drama
1987	Kim Hye-soo	Samogok
1988	Choi Soo-ji	The Land
1989	Lee Mi-yeon	Tree Blooming with Love
1990	Do Ji-won	Seoul Earthenware Pot
1990	Oh Hyun-kyung	Ambitious Times
1991	Hong Ri-na	Ambitious Times
1992	Kim Hye-ri	A Farewell Morning
1993	Kim Jung-nan	Tomorrow Love
1994	Lee Ah-hyun	Daughters of a Rich Family
1995	Kim Hee-sun	Son of the Wind, Men of the Bath House
1995	Park Sung-ah	A Sunny Place of the Young
1996	Lee Hye-young	First Love
1996	Park Sun-young	White Dandelion
1997	Yoon Ji-sook	When You Call Me
1997	Lee Eun-joo	Tears of the Dragon; Happy Morning; Bride Room; A River of Mortality; When You Call Me; Wedding Dress
1998	Kang Sung-yeon	My Love by My Side
1998	Myung Se-bin	Pure, Paper Crane
1999	Bae Doona	School, Ad Madness
1999	Choi Kang-hee	School, Ad Madness
2000	Bae Min-hee	TV Literature "Dandelion"
2000	Kim Hyo-jin	RNA
2001	Hong Soo-hyun	Orient Theatre
2001	Kim Gyu-ri	Like Father, Unlike Son
2002	Kim Yoo-mi	Man of the Sun, Lee Je-ma
2002	Lee Yoo-ri	Loving You
2003	Han Ga-in	Yellow Handkerchief
2003	Han Ji-hye	Summer Scent
2003	Maya	Bodyguard
2004	Han Hye-jin	You Are a Star
2004	Im Soo-jung	I'm Sorry, I Love You
2004	Kim Tae-hee	Forbidden Love
2005	Han Ji-min	Resurrection
2005	Kim Ah-joong	Bizarre Bunch
2005	Lee Bo-young	My Sweetheart, My Darling
2006	Ku Hye-sun	Hearts of Nineteen
2006	Lee Yoon-ji	Hearts of Nineteen
2006	Yoon Eun-hye	The Vineyard Man
2007	Lee Soo-kyung	Daughters-in-Law
2007	Park Min-young	I Am Sam
2008	Im Yoona	You Are My Destiny
2009	Kim So-eun	Boys Over Flowers, He Who Can't Marry
2010	Lee Si-young	Becoming a Billionaire
2010	Oh Ji-eun	Three Brothers, Smile Again
2011	Bae Suzy	Dream High
2011	Uee	Ojakgyo Family
2012	Jin Se-yeon	Bridal Mask
2012	Oh Yeon-seo	My Husband Got a Family
2013	IU	You Are the Best!, Bel Ami
2013	Kyung Soo-jin	Eunhui, Don't Look Back: The Legend of Orpheus
2014	Kim Seul-gi	Discovery of Love, Drama Special "I'm Dying Soon"
2014	Nam Ji-hyun	What's With This Family
2015	Chae Soo-bin	House of Bluebird, Cheer Up!
2015	Kim So-hyun	Who Are You: School 2015
2016	Kim Ji-won	Descendants of the Sun
2016	Lee Se-young	The Gentlemen of Wolgyesu Tailor Shop
2017	Ryu Hwa-young	My Father is Strange, Mad Dog
2017	Kim Se-jeong	School 2017
2018	Park Se-wan	Marry Me Now, Too Bright for Love, Just Dance
2018	Seol In-ah	Sunny Again Tomorrow
2019	Kwon Nara	Doctor Prisoner
2019	Son Dam-bi	When the Camellia Blooms
2020	Bona	Homemade Love Story
2020	Shin Ye-eun	Welcome
2020	Lee Cho-hee	Once Again
2021	Lee Se-hee	Young Lady and Gentleman
2021	Jung Soo-jung	Police University
2021	Park Gyu-young	Dali and the Cocky Prince
2022	Kang Mi-na	Moonshine
2022	Seohyun	Jinxed at First
2022	Jung Ji-so	Curtain Call
2023	Seo Ji-hye	My Perfect Stranger
2024	Hong Ye-ji(actress)	Love Song for Illusion
2024	Han Soo-a	Beauty and Mr.Romantic

== Youth Awards ==
=== Best Young Actor ===
Year	Winner	Drama
1991	Yang Dong-geun	Older Brother
1992	Kim Sun-woo	Older Brother, For Love
1993	Jung Tae-woo	The Break of Dawn, Love and Farewell
1994	Lee Min-woo	When I Miss You, Han Myung-hoi, The Tale of Chunhyang, Classroom Where Love Blooms
1995	Yoon Dong-won	A Sunny Place of the Young
1996	Ahn Chi-sung	Milky Way
1997	Seo Jae-kyung	When You Call Me
1998	Jung Tae-woo	The King and the Queen
1999	Kim Rae-won	School 2
1999	Shim Ji-ho	School 2
2000	Zo In-sung	School 3
2001	Yeo Wook-hwan	School 4
2002	Maeng Se-chang	Moon on Cheomseongdae
2002	Oh Seung-yoon	Magic Kid Masuri
2003	Lee Byung-joon	Yellow Handkerchief, The Wife
2004	Lee Joon-hyuk	A Second Proposal
2004	Park Gun-tae	I'm Sorry, I Love You
2005	Park Ji-bin	Golden Apple, Drama City "Goblins Are Alive"
2005	Yoo Seung-ho	Immortal Admiral Yi Sun-sin, Precious Family
2006	Kim Seok	Seoul 1945
2007	Choi Woo-hyuk	Capital Scandal, Hometown Over the Hill
2008	Lee Hyun-woo	The Great King, Sejong
2009	Park Chan-ik	Father's House
2010	Oh Jae-moo	Bread, Love and Dreams
2011	Park Hee-gun	Ojakgyo Family
2012	Noh Young-hak	Dream of the Emperor
2013	Yeon Joon-seok	Don't Look Back: The Legend of Orpheus
2014	Kwak Dong-yeon	Inspiring Generation
2015	Choi Kwon-soo	Drama Special – "The Brothers' Summer"
2016	Jung Yun-seok	Five Enough, Jang Yeong-sil, Love in the Moonlight
2017	Jung Joon-won	My Father is Strange
2018	Nam Da-reum	Radio Romance
2019	Kim Kang-hoon	When the Camellia Blooms
2020	Moon Woo-jin	Once Again
2021	Jo Yi-hyun	Youth of May
2021	Seo Woo-jin	Young Lady and Gentleman
2022	Jung Min-joon	Gold Mask
2023	Moon Woo-jin	Dog Days of Summer

=== Best Young Actress ===
Year	Winner	Drama
1991	Lee Jung-hoo	Asphalt My Hometown
1992	Kim Min-jung	Drama Game "Sand Castle", For Love
1993	Lee Jae-eun	January
1994	Park Lucia	Han Myung-hoi
1995	Kim So-yeon	Daughters of a Rich Family, Drama Game "Minwoo vs. Minwoo", "What Summer of Two Girls"
1996	Ryu Se-bin	Milky Way
1997	Jang Soo-hye	Because I Really
1997	Kwon Hae-kwang	Meadow Light
1998	Kim Min-jung	The King and The Queen
1999	Jang Soo-hye	Eun-ah's Garden
1999	Kim Min-hee	School 2
2000	Moon Geun-young	Autumn in My Heart
2001	Lee Yoo-ri	School 4
2002	Shin Ji-soo	Solitude
2003	Song Min-joo	Sang Doo! Let's Go to School
2004	Go Ara	Sharp #1
2004	Han Ji-hye	A Second Proposal
2005	Lee Se-young	Rain Shower
2005	Yoo Yeon-mi	Golden Apple
2006	Shim Eun-kyung	Hwang Jini, Drama City "Kkotnim-yi"
2007	Kim Ye-won	The Innocent Woman
2008	Shim Eun-kyung	Women of the Sun
2009	Park Eun-bin	Empress Cheonchu
2010	Kim Yoo-jung	Grudge: The Revolt of Gumiho
2010	Seo Shin-ae	Grudge: The Revolt of Gumiho
2011	Kim Hwan-hee	Believe in Love, My One and Only
2012	Nam Ji-hyun	Drama Special "Girl Detective Park Hae-sol"
2013	Kim Yoo-bin	The Fugitive of Joseon
2014	Ahn Seo-hyun	Single-minded Dandelion
2014	Hong Hwa-ri	Wonderful Days
2015	Kim Hyang-gi	Snowy Road
2016	Heo Jung-eun	My Lawyer, Mr. Jo, Love in the Moonlight, My Fair Lady
2017	Lee Re	Witch at Court
2018	Kim Hwan-hee	The Miracle We Met
2019	Joo Ye-rim	Mother of Mine
2019	Park Da-yeon	The Tale of Nokdu
2020	Lee Ga-yeon	Once Again
2021	Choi Myung-bin	The King's Affection, Young Lady and Gentleman
2021	Lee Re	Hello, Me!
2022	Yoon Chae-na	Love Twist, The Love in Your Eyes
2023	Kim Si-eun	Apple of My Eye [ko]

== PD Award ==
Year	Winner	Drama
2012	Uhm Tae-woong	Man from the Equator
2013	Joo Won	Good Doctor
2014	Cho Jae-hyun	Jeong Do-jeon
2015	Kim Hye-ja	Unkind Ladies

== Best Writer ==
Year	Winner	Drama
1997	Moon Young-nam	Because I Really
2000	Choi Yoon-jung	More Than Words Can Say
2001	Choi Hyun-kyung	Tender Hearts
2002	Lee Deok-jae	This Is Love
2003	Park Jung-ran	Yellow Handkerchief
2004	Moon Young-nam	Terms of Endearment
2004	Noh Hee-kyung	More Beautiful Than a Flower
2005	Kim Ji-woo	Resurrection
2005	Kim Soo-hyun	Precious Family
2006	Yoon Sun-joo	Hwang Jini
2007	Jang Young-chul	Dae Jo-yeong
2009	Jo Jung-sun	My Too Perfect Sons
2010	Kang Eun-kyung	Bread, Love and Dreams
2011	Lee Jung-sun	Ojakgyo Family
2012	Park Ji-eun	My Husband Got a Family
2013	Moon Young-nam	Wang's Family
2014	Jung Hyun-min	Jeong Do-jeon
2014	Kang Eun-kyung	What's With This Family
2015	Kim In-young	Unkind Ladies
2016	Kim Eun-sook	Descendants of the Sun
2016	Kim Won-suk	Descendants of the Sun
2017	So Hyun-kyung	My Golden Life
2018	Kim Sa-kyung	My Only One
2019	Lim Sang-choon	When the Camellia Blooms
2020	Yang Hee-seung	Once Again
2021	Kim Sa-kyung	Young Lady and Gentleman

== Popularity Awards ==
=== Popularity Award, Actor ===
Year	Winner	Drama
1986	Kil Yong-woo	Samogok
1995	Kim Kyu-chul	When I Miss You
1998	Ahn Jae-mo	The King and Queen
2000	Kim Sang-kyung	Snowflakes
2000	Song Seung-heon	Autumn in My Heart
2001	Lee Chang-hoon	Stock Flower
2001	Ryu Jin	Stock Flower
2002	Bae Yong-joon	Winter Sonata
2002	Choi Soo-jong	Man of the Sun, Lee Je-ma
2003	Cha Seung-won	Bodyguard
2003	Kim Seung-woo	Rosemary
2004	Rain	Full House
2004	So Ji-sub	I'm Sorry, I Love You
2005	Namkoong Min	My Rosy Life
2005	Song Il-kook	Emperor of the Sea
2006	Hyun Bin	The Snow Queen
2006	Oh Man-seok	The Vineyard Man
2007	Jeong Bo-seok	Dae Jo-yeong
2008	Jang Keun-suk	Hong Gil-dong
2009	Yoon Sang-hyun	My Fair Lady
2010	Song Joong-ki	Sungkyunkwan Scandal
2011	Kim Soo-hyun	Dream High
2011	Park Si-hoo	The Princess' Man
2012	Joo Won	Bridal Mask
2013	Ji Sung	Secret Love
2014	Ji Chang-wook	Healer
2014	Joo Won	Naeil's Cantabile
2015	Nam Joo-hyuk	Who Are You: School 2015
2015	Park Bo-gum	Hello Monster
2021	Jung Jin-young	Police University
2021	Rowoon	The King's Affection
2022	Do Kyung-soo	Bad Prosecutor
2022	Kang Ha-neul	Curtain Call
2023	Ahn Jae-hyun	The Real Has Come!
2023	Ji Seung-hyun	Korea–Khitan War
2023	Lee Sang-yeob	My Lovely Boxer
2023	Rowoon	The Matchmakers

=== Popularity Award, Actress ===
Year	Winner	Drama
2000	Bae Doona	RNA
2000	Song Hye-kyo	Autumn in My Heart
2001	Han Go-eun	Like Father, Unlike Son
2001	Lee Seung-yeon	Orient Theatre
2001	Lee Yo-won	Blue Mist
2002	Choi Ji-woo	Winter Sonata
2002	Eugene	Loving You
2003	Han Go-eun	Bodyguard
2003	Son Tae-young	One Million Roses
2004	Im Soo-jung	I'm Sorry, I Love You
2004	Song Hye-kyo	Full House
2005	Han Chae-young	Sassy Girl Chun-hyang
2005	Lee Tae-ran	My Rosy Life
2006	Choi Jung-won	Famous Princesses
2006	Sung Yu-ri	The Snow Queen
2007	Han Hyo-joo	Heaven & Earth
2008	Jang Mi-hee	Mom's Dead Upset
2008	Sung Yu-ri	Hong Gil-dong
2009	Kim So-yeon	IRIS
2009	Yoon Eun-hye	My Fair Lady
2010	Moon Geun-young	Cinderella's Stepsister, Mary Stayed Out All Night
2011	Han Hye-jin	The Thorn Birds
2011	Moon Chae-won	The Princess' Man
2012	Bae Suzy	Big
2013	Moon Chae-won	Good Doctor
2014	Jung Eun-ji	Trot Lovers
2014	Lee Da-hee	Big Man
2015	Kim Seol-hyun	Orange Marmalade
2015	Jo Bo-ah	All About My Mom
2021	Kim So-hyun	River Where the Moon Rises
2021	Park Eun-bin	The King's Affection
2022	Krystal Jung	Crazy Love
2022	Lee Se-hee	Bad Prosecutor
2023	Cho Yi-hyun	The Matchmakers
2023	Seol In-ah	Oasis
2023	Uee	Live Your Own Life

=== Netizen Award, Actor ===
Year	Winner	Drama
2003	Rain	Sang Doo! Let's Go to School
2004	So Ji-sub	I'm Sorry, I Love You
2005	Rain	A Love to Kill
2006	Hyun Bin	The Snow Queen
2007	Choi Soo-jong	Dae Jo-yeong
2008	Kang Ji-hwan	Hong Gil-dong
2009	Lee Byung-hun	IRIS
2010	Jang Keun-suk	Mary Stayed Out All Night
2010	Park Yoochun	Sungkyunkwan Scandal
2011	Shin Ha-kyun	Brain
2012	Song Joong-ki	The Innocent Man
2013	Joo Won	Good Doctor
2014	Eric Mun	Discovery of Love
2015	Kim Soo-hyun	The Producers
2016	Park Bo-gum	Love in the Moonlight
2017	Park Seo-joon	Fight for My Way
2018	Park Hyung-sik	Suits
2018	Kim Myung-min	The Miracle We Met
2019	Kang Ha-neul	When the Camellia Blooms
2020	Kim Young-dae	Cheat on Me, If You Can
2020	Lee Sang Yeob	Once Again
2021	Jinyoung	Police University
2021	Rowoon	The King's Affection

=== Netizen Award, Actress ===
Year	Winner	Drama
2003	Gong Hyo-jin	Sang Doo! Let's Go to School
2004	Im Soo-jung	I'm Sorry, I Love You
2005	Choi Jin-sil	My Rosy Life
2006	Ha Ji-won	Hwang Jini
2007	Han Ji-min	Capital Scandal
2008	Im Yoona	You Are My Destiny
2009	Ku Hye-sun	Boys Over Flowers
2010	Park Min-young	Sungkyunkwan Scandal
2011	Choi Jung-won	Brain
2012	Moon Chae-won	The Innocent Man
2012	Im Yoona	Love Rain
2013	Hwang Jung-eum	Secret Love
2014	Jung Yu-mi	Discovery of Love
2015	Kim So-hyun	Who Are You: School 2015
2017	Kim Ji-won	Fight for My Way
2020	Jo Bo-ah	Forest
2021	Kim So-hyun	River Where the Moon Rises
2021	Park Eun-bin	The King's Affection

=== Best Couple Award ===
Year	Winner	Drama
2003	Kim Seung-woo and Yoo Ho-jeong	Rosemary
2003	Rain and Gong Hyo-jin	Sang Doo! Let's Go to School
2004	Ahn Jae-wook and Park Sun-young	Oh Feel Young
2004	Rain and Song Hye-kyo	Full House
2004	So Ji-sub and Im Soo-jung	I'm Sorry, I Love You
2004	Song Il-kook and Han Ga-in	Terms of Endearment
2005	Jae Hee and Han Chae-young	Sassy Girl Chun-hyang
2005	Son Hyun-joo and Choi Jin-sil	My Rosy Life
2005	Song Il-kook and Soo Ae	Emperor of the Sea
2005	Uhm Tae-woong and Han Ji-min	Resurrection
2006	Hyun Bin and Sung Yu-ri	The Snow Queen
2006	Jang Keun-suk and Ha Ji-won	Hwang Jini
2006	Oh Man-seok and Yoon Eun-hye	The Vineyard Man
2006	Park Hae-jin and Lee Tae-ran	Famous Princesses
2007	Kang Ji-hwan and Han Ji-min	Capital Scandal
2007	Kim Ji-hoon and Lee Soo-kyung	Daughters-in-Law
2007	Park Hae-jin and Han Hyo-joo	Heaven & Earth
2008	Kang Ji-hwan and Sung Yu-ri	Hong Gil-dong
2008	Kim Yong-gun and Jang Mi-hee	Mom's Dead Upset
2008	Song Il-kook and Choi Jung-won	The Kingdom of the Winds
2009	Lee Byung-hun and Kim Tae-hee	IRIS
2009	Lee Min-ho and Koo Hye-sun	Boys Over Flowers
2009	Lee Pil-mo and Yoo Sun	My Too Perfect Sons
2009	Yoon Sang-hyun and Yoon Eun-hye	My Fair Lady
2010	Jang Hyuk and Lee Da-hae	The Slave Hunters
2010	Jang Keun-suk and Moon Geun-young	Mary Stayed Out All Night
2010	Park Yoochun and Park Min-young	Sungkyunkwan Scandal
2010	Song Joong-ki and Yoo Ah-in	Sungkyunkwan Scandal
2010	Yoon Shi-yoon and Lee Young-ah	Bread, Love and Dreams
2011	Kim Soo-hyun and Bae Suzy	Dream High
2011	Lee Min-woo and Hong Soo-hyun	The Princess' Man
2011	Park Si-hoo and Moon Chae-won	The Princess' Man
2011	Ryu Soo-young and Choi Jung-yoon	Ojakgyo Family
2011	Shin Ha-kyun and Choi Jung-won	Brain
2012	Lee Hee-joon and Jo Yoon-hee	My Husband Got a Family
2012	Lee Sang-yoon and Lee Bo-young	Seoyoung, My Daughter
2012	Song Joong-ki and Moon Chae-won	The Innocent Man
2012	Yoo Jun-sang and Kim Nam-joo	My Husband Got a Family
2013	Ji Sung and Hwang Jung-eum	Secret Love
2013	Jo Jung-suk and IU	You Are the Best!
2013	Joo Won and Moon Chae-won	Good Doctor
2013	Lee Beom-soo and Im Yoona	Prime Minister and I
2013	Oh Ji-ho and Kim Hye-soo	Queen of the Office
2014	Eric Mun and Jung Yu-mi	Discovery of Love
2014	Ji Chang-wook and Park Min-young	Healer
2014	Kim Sang-kyung and Kim Hyun-joo	What's With This Family
2014	Lee Joon-gi and Nam Sang-mi	Gunman in Joseon
2014	Park Hyung-sik and Nam Ji-hyun	What's With This Family
2015	Jang Hyuk and Han Chae-ah	The Merchant: Gaekju 2015
2015	So Ji-sub and Shin Min-a	Oh My Venus
2015	Kim Soo-hyun and Gong Hyo-jin and Cha Tae-hyun	The Producers
2015	Yook Sungjae and Kim So-hyun	Who Are You: School 2015
2016	Song Joong-ki and Song Hye-kyo	Descendants of the Sun
2016	Jin Goo and Kim Ji-won	Descendants of the Sun
2016	Park Bo-gum and Kim Yoo-jung	Love in the Moonlight
2016	Lee Sang-yoon and Kim Ha-neul	On the Way to the Airport
2016	Oh Ji-ho and Heo Jung-eun	My Fair Lady
2016	Cha In-pyo and Ra Mi-ran	The Gentlemen of Wolgyesu Tailor Shop
2016	Lee Se-young and Hyun Woo	The Gentlemen of Wolgyesu Tailor Shop
2017	Yoon Hyun-min and Jung Ryeo-won	Witch at Court
2017	Son Ho-jun and Jang Na-ra	Confession Couple
2017	Park Si-hoo and Shin Hye-sun	My Golden Life
2017	Park Seo-joon and Kim Ji-won	Fight for My Way
2017	Ryu Soo-young and Lee Yoo-ri	My Father is Strange
2017	Namkoong Min and Lee Jun-ho	Good Manager
2018	Seo Kang-joon and Gong Seung-yeon	Are You Human?
2018	Choi Daniel and Baek Jin-hee	Jugglers
2018	Kim Myung-min and Ra Mi-ran	The Miracle We Met
2018	Cha Tae-hyun and Bae Doona	Matrimonial Chaos
2018	Yoo Dong-geun and Chang Mi-hee	Marry Me Now
2018	Lee Jang-woo and Uee	My Only One
2018	Choi Soo-jong and Jin Kyung	My Only One
2019	Kang Ha-neul and Gong Hyo-jin	When the Camellia Blooms
2019	Oh Jung-se and Yeom Hye-ran	When the Camellia Blooms
2019	Jang Dong-yoon and Kim So-hyun	The Tale of Nokdu
2019	Yoo Jun-sang and Shin Dong-mi	Liver or Die
2019	Jang Hyun-sung and Kim Jung-nan	Doctor Prisoner
2019	Kim Myung-soo and Shin Hye-sun	Angel's Last Mission: Love
2020	Jin Ki-joo and Lee Jang-woo	Homemade Love Story
2020	Jeong Bo-seok and Lee Jang-woo	Homemade Love Story
2020	Nana and Park Sung-hoon	Into The Ring
2020	Cho Yeo-jeong and Go Jun	Cheat on Me, If You Can
2020	Jo Bo-ah and Park Hae Jin	Forest
2020	Lee Sang yi and Lee Cho-hee	Once Again
2020	Chun Ho-jin and Lee Jung-eun	Once Again
2020	Lee Min-jung and Lee Sang-yeob	Once Again
2021	Rowoon and Park Eun-bin	The King's Affection
2021	Ji Hyun-woo and Lee Se-hee	Young Lady and Gentleman
2021	Na In-woo and Kim So-hyun	River Where the Moon Rises
2021	Cha Tae-hyun and Jinyoung	Police University
2021	Kim Min-jae and Park Kyu-young	Dali and the Cocky Prince
2021	Kim Yo-han and Cho Yi-hyun	School 2021
2021	Lee Do-hyun and Go Min-si	Youth of May
2022	Do Kyung-soo and Lee Se-hee	Bad Prosecutor
2022	Kang Ha-neul and Ha Ji-won	Curtain Call
2022	Kim Seung-soo and Kim So-eun	Three Bold Siblings
2022	Lee Joon and Kang Han-na	Bloody Heart
2022	Lee Seung-gi and Lee Se-young	The Law Cafe
2022	Na In-woo and Seohyun	Jinxed at First
2022	Yoon Shi-yoon and Bae Da-bin	It's Beautiful Now
2022	Seo In-guk and Oh Yeon-seo	Café Minamdang
2023	Ahn Jae-hyun and Baek Jin-hee	The Real Has Come!
2023	Ha Jun and Uee	Live Your Own Life
2023	Jang Dong-yoon and Seol In-ah	Oasis
2023	Choi Soo-jong and Kim Dong-jun	Korea–Khitan War
2023	Rowoon and Cho Yi-hyun	The Matchmakers

== Special Award ==
Year	Winner	Notes
2001	Korea Arts	Emperor Wang Geon
2002	Kim Sung-hwan	Actor
2003	Choi Soo-jong	Actor
2004	Yoon Seok-ho	Director, Winter Sonata
2005	Im Byung-ki	Actor
2006	Moon Young-nam	Screenwriter, Famous Princesses
2007	Na Sang-yeob	Producer, Sayuksin
2008	Shin Hyun-taek	Samhwa Networks CEO, Mom's Dead Upset
2016	Song Joong-ki and Song Hye-kyo	Asia Best Couple Award, Descendants of the Sun
2019	Kim Myung-soo	K-Drama Hallyu Star, Angel's Last Mission: Love
2019	Kim Se-jeong	K-Drama Hallyu Star, I Wanna Hear Your Song

== Soundtrack ==
=== Best OST ===
Year	Winner	Drama
2017	BtoB – "Ambiguous" (알듯 말듯해)	Fight for My Way

== Discontinued awards ==
=== Best Actor ===
Year	Winner	Drama
1989	Park In-hwan	The Region of Calm
1999	Kim Kyu-chul	
2000	Park Sang-min	The Full Sun
2000	Won Bin	Tough Guy's Love, Autumn in My Heart
2001	Kim Ho-jin	Tender Hearts
2001	Kim Kap-soo	Emperor Wang Geon
2002	Jo Min-ki	Hard Love
2002	Park Yong-ha	Winter Sonata
2003	Kim Seung-soo	One Million Roses
2003	Park Yong-woo	Age of Warriors
2004	Rain	Full House
2004	So Ji-sub	I'm Sorry, I Love You
2005	Son Hyun-joo	My Rosy Life
2005	Song Il-kook	Emperor of the Sea
2005	Uhm Tae-woong	Resurrection, Sassy Girl Chun-hyang
2006	Go Joo-won	Famous Princesses
2006	Kim Jin-tae	Dae Jo-yeong

=== Best Actress ===
Year	Winner	Drama
1999	Kim Hye-sun	
2000	Bae Jong-ok	Foolish Love
2000	Jung Sun-kyung	More Than Words Can Say
2001	Kim Hye-ri	Emperor Wang Geon
2001	Yoon Hae-young	This Is Love
2002	Lee Hye-sook	Stepmother
2002	Lee Tae-ran	Who's My Love
2003	Chu Sang-mi	Yellow Handkerchief
2003	Gong Hyo-jin	Sang Doo! Let's Go to School
2003	Uhm Jung-hwa	Wife
2004	Han Ga-in	Terms of Endearment
2004	Park Sun-young	Oh Feel Young
2005	Lee Hye-sook	A Farewell to Sorrow
2005	Soo Ae	Emperor of the Sea
2006	Choi Jung-won	Famous Princesses
2006	Han Eun-jung	Seoul 1945

=== Photogenic Award, Actor ===
Year	Winner	Drama
2000	Song Seung-heon	Autumn in My Heart
2001	Lee Joo-hyun	Plum Blossom Story

=== Photogenic Award, Actress ===
Year	Winner	Drama
2000	Song Hye-kyo	Autumn in My Heart
2001	Han Go-eun	Like Father, Unlike Son

=== PD of the Year ===
Year	Winner	Drama
2000	Kim Young-jin	Did You Ever Love?
2001	Yoon Chang-beom	Empress Myeongseong

=== Viewer's Choice Drama ===
Year	Winner
2000	Autumn in My Heart
2000	Emperor Wang Geon

=== Congeniality Award ===
Year	Winner	Notes
2000	Ki Jung-soo	
2007	Park Seung-gyu	President of the KBS Drama Actors Association
2008	Lee Hyo-jung	Actor

== See also ==
- List of Asian television awards
- SBS Drama Awards
- MBC Drama Awards
