= 2008 KBS Drama Awards =

22nd edition of award ceremony

- Date: December 31, 2008
- Hosted by: Choi Soo-jong; Han Ji-min

Television coverage
- Network: KBS

The 2008 KBS Drama Awards is a ceremony honoring the outstanding achievement in television on the Korean Broadcasting System (KBS) network for the year of 2008. It was held on December 31, 2008 and hosted by Choi Soo-jong and Han Ji-min.

== Nominations and winners ==
(Winners denoted in bold)

Grand Prize (Daesang)
**Kim Hye-ja** – **Mom's Dead Upset**
Top Excellence Award, Actor	Top Excellence Award, Actress
**Song Il-gook** – **The Kingdom of the Winds**; Baek Il-seob – Mom's Dead Upset; Kang Ji-hwan – Hong Gil-dong; Kim Sang-kyung – The Great King, Sejong; Lee Soon-jae – Mom's Dead Upset	**Kim Ji-soo** – **Women of the Sun**; Choi Myung-gil – The Great King, Sejong; Jang Mi-hee – Mom's Dead Upset; Kim Hye-ja – Mom's Dead Upset
Excellence Award, Actor in a Miniseries	Excellence Award, Actress in a Miniseries
**Jung Jin-young** – **The Kingdom of the Winds**; Han Jae-suk – Women of the Sun; Hyun Bin – The World That They Live In; Jang Keun-suk – Hong Gil-dong; Lee Jong-hyuk – Formidable Rivals	**Lee Ha-na** – **Women of the Sun**; **Choi Jung-won** – **The Kingdom of the Winds**; Jung Ae-ri – Women of the Sun; Song Hye-kyo – The World That They Live In; Sung Yu-ri – Hong Gil-dong
Excellence Award, Actor in a Serial Drama	Excellence Award, Actress in a Serial Drama
**Lee Won-jong** – **The Great King, Sejong**; Ji Hyun-woo – My Precious You; Kim Sung-soo – My Precious You; Park Sang-min – The Great King, Sejong; Ryu Jin – Mom's Dead Upset	**Lee Yoon-ji** – **The Great King, Sejong**; Lee Tae-ran – My Precious You; Park Hae-mi – My Precious You; Shin Eun-kyung – Mom's Dead Upset
Excellence Award, Actor in a Daily Drama	Excellence Award, Actress in a Daily Drama
**Lee Pil-mo** – **You Are My Destiny**; Kim Yeong-cheol – Returned Earthen Bowl; Lee Ji-hoon – You Are My Destiny; Yoon Hee-seok – You Stole My Heart	**Kim Jung-nan** – **You Are My Destiny**; Gong Hyun-joo – You Are My Destiny; Kim Sung-eun – Returned Earthen Bowl; Park Da-an – I Like You; Park So-hyun – The Innocent Woman
Excellence Award, Actor in a One-Act/Special/Short Drama	Excellence Award, Actress in a One-Act/Special/Short Drama
**Yoon Hee-seok** – **HDTV Literature "Spring, Spring Spring"**, **Things We Do That We Know We Will Regret**; Jo Hee-bong – Drama City "Disciplinary Committee"; Jung Sung-hwa – Drama City "The Wind Blows"; Kim Ho-jin – Things We Do That We Know We Will Regret; Lee Won-jong – Korean Ghost Stories "Demon's Story"	**Park Min-young** – **Korean Ghost Stories "Nine-tailed Fox"**; Jang Hee-jin – Drama City "The Love Revenger, Miss Jo"; Jo Eun-sook – Korean Ghost Stories "Baby, Let's Go to Cheong Mountain"; Kim Jung-hwa – Things We Do That We Know We Will Regret; Lee Yoon-ji – HDTV Literature "Spring, Spring Spring"
Best Supporting Actor	Best Supporting Actress
**Kim Yong-gun** – **Mom's Dead Upset**; **Um Ki-joon** – **The World That They Live In**; Jo Hee-bong – Hong Gil-dong; Kang Ji-sub – Women of the Sun; Park Jun-gyu – My Precious You	**Bae Jong-ok** – **The World That They Live In**; Choi Soo-rin – My Precious You; Kim Na-woon – Mom's Dead Upset; Kim Sung-ryung – The Great King, Sejong; Lee Hye-sook – You Are My Destiny
Best New Actor	Best New Actress
**Jung Gyu-woon** – **Women of the Sun**; Ki Tae-young – Mom's Dead Upset; Lee Chun-hee – The Great King, Sejong; Park Jae-jung – You Are My Destiny	**Im Yoon-ah** – **You Are My Destiny**; Hong Ah-reum – My Precious You; Lee Ha-na – Women of the Sun; Seo Hyo-rim – The World That They Live In
Best Young Actor	Best Young Actress
**Lee Hyun-woo** – **The Great King, Sejong**; Ahn Do-gyu – Single Dad in Love; Kim Dong-hyun – Returned Earthen Bowl; Maeng Se-chang – Hong Gil-dong	**Shim Eun-kyung** – **Women of the Sun**; Han Bo-bae – My Pitiful Sister; Jo Soo-min – Mom's Dead Upset; Kim So-hyun – Korean Ghost Stories "Baby, Let's Go to Cheong Mountain"; Yeo Min-joo – The Great King, Sejong
Netizen Award, Actor	Netizen Award, Actress
**Kang Ji-hwan** – **Hong Gil-dong**; Eric Mun – Strongest Chil Woo; Hyun Bin – The World That They Live In; Jae Hee – One Mom and Three Dads; Jang Keun-suk – Hong Gil-dong; Ji Hyun-woo – My Precious You; Jo Hyun-jae – One Mom and Three Dads; Jung Gyu-woon – Women of the Sun; Jung Jin-young – The Kingdom of the Winds; Kim Ji-hoon – Love Marriage; Kim Sang-kyung – The Great King, Sejong; Kim Sung-soo – My Precious You; Lee Jin-wook – Formidable Rivals; Lee Jong-hyuk – Formidable Rivals; Oh Ji-ho – Single Dad in Love; Park Gun-hyung – The Kingdom of the Winds; Park Jae-jung – You Are My Destiny; Ryu Jin – Mom's Dead Upset; Song Il-gook – The Kingdom of the Winds; Um Ki-joon – The World That They Live In	**Im Yoon-ah** – **You Are My Destiny**; Bae Jong-ok – The World That They Live In; Chae Rim – Formidable Rivals; Choi Jung-won – The Kingdom of the Winds; Eugene – One Mom and Three Dads; Jang Mi-hee – Mom's Dead Upset; Kang Boo-ja – Mom's Dead Upset; Kang Sung-yeon – Single Dad in Love; Kim Hye-ja – Mom's Dead Upset; Kim Ji-soo – Women of the Sun; Kim Min-hee – Love Marriage; Kim Sung-eun – Returned Earthen Bowl; Ku Hye-sun – Strongest Chil Woo; Lee Ha-na – Women of the Sun; Lee Tae-ran – My Precious You; Lee Yoon-ji – The Great King, Sejong; Oh Yoon-ah – The Kingdom of the Winds; Shin Eun-kyung – Mom's Dead Upset; Song Hye-kyo – The World That They Live In; Sung Yu-ri – Hong Gil-dong
Popularity Award, Actor	Popularity Award, Actress
**Jang Keun-suk** – **Hong Gil-dong**	**Jang Mi-hee** – **Mom's Dead Upset**; **Sung Yu-ri** – **Hong Gil-dong**
Best Couple Award	Congeniality Award
**Kang Ji-hwan** and **Sung Yu-ri** – **Hong Gil-dong**; **Kim Yong-gun** and **Jang Mi-hee** – **Mom's Dead Upset**; **Song Il-gook** and **Choi Jung-won** – **The Kingdom of the Winds**; Baek Il-seob and Kim Hye-ja – Mom's Dead Upset; Choi Won-young and Park Grina – Beautiful Days; Eric Mun and Ku Hye-sun – Strongest Chil Woo; Han Jae-suk and Lee Ha-na – Women of the Sun; Hyun Bin and Song Hye-kyo – The World That They Live In; Jae Hee and Eugene – One Mom and Three Dads; Ji Hyun-woo and Yoo In-young – My Precious You; Jo Hyun-jae and Eugene – One Mom and Three Dads; Jung Gyu-woon and Kim Ji-soo – Women of the Sun; Kang Kyung-joon and Kim Sung-eun – Returned Earthen Bowl; Kim Dong-yoon and Lee Eun-woo – Hometown Over the Hill; Kim Ji-hoon and Kim Min-hee – Love Marriage; Kim Jung-hyun and Kim Na-woon – Mom's Dead Upset; Kim Kap-soo and Bae Jong-ok – The World That They Live In; Kim Sang-kyung and Lee Yoon-ji – The Great King, Sejong; Kim Sung-soo and Lee Tae-ran – My Precious You; Lee Jin-wook and Chae Rim – Formidable Rivals; Lee Pil-mo and Kim Jung-nan – You Are My Destiny; Lee Si-hwan and Park So-hyun – The Innocent Woman; Lee Soon-jae and Jo Yang-ja – Mom's Dead Upset; Oh Ji-ho and Huh E-jae – Single Dad in Love; Park Gun-hyung and Choi Jung-won – The Kingdom of the Winds; Park Jae-jung and Im Yoon-ah – You Are My Destiny; Ryu Jin and Shin Eun-kyung – Mom's Dead Upset; Shin Sung-rok and Eugene – One Mom and Three Dads; Song Il-gook and Kim Jung-hwa – The Kingdom of the Winds; Yoon Hee-seok and Shin Dong-mi – You Stole My Heart	**Lee Hyo-jung**
Special Award	Lifetime Achievement Award
**Shin Hyun-taek** – **Samhwa Networks CEO, Mom's Dead Upset**	**Yoo Chul-joo**
