= 45th Baeksang Arts Awards =

2009 South Korean award ceremony

- Date: February 27, 2009
- Site: Olympic Park, Seoul
- Hosted by: Jeon Mi-seon; Tak Jae-hoon

Television coverage
- Network: SBS

The 45th Baeksang Arts Awards ceremony took place on February 27, 2009, at the Olympic Park in Seoul. Presented by IS Plus Corp., it was broadcast on SBS and hosted by actor Tak Jae-hoon and actress Jeon Mi-seon.

== Nominations and winners ==
Complete list of nominees and winners:

(Winners denoted in bold)

=== Film ===
Grand Prize (Film)
**Kang Woo-suk - Public Enemy Returns**
Best Film	Best Screenplay
**Viva! Love**; A Frozen Flower; The Good, the Bad, the Weird; Rough Cut; Scandal Makers	**Kang Hyeong-cheol** - **Scandal Makers**; Jang Jin - Public Enemy Returns; Kim Ki-duk - Rough Cut; Kim Young-nam - My Friend and His Wife; Park Yoon - Viva! Love
Best Actor (Film)	Best Actress (Film)
**Joo Jin-mo - A Frozen Flower as The King**; Ha Jung-woo - My Dear Enemy as Cho Byung-woon; Kim Joo-hyuk - My Wife Got Married as Noh Deok-hoon; Sul Kyung-gu - Public Enemy Returns as Kang Chul-joong; Song Kang-ho - The Good, the Bad, the Weird as Yoon Tae-goo/The Weird	**Son Ye-jin** - **My Wife Got Married as Joo In-ah**; Gong Hyo-jin - Crush and Blush as Yang Mi-sook; Kim Hae-sook - Viva! Love as Bong-soon; Kim Min-sun - Portrait of a Beauty as Shin Yun-bok; Soo Ae - Sunny as Soon-yi/Sunny
Best New Actor (Film)	Best New Actress (Film)
**Kang Ji-hwan** - **Rough Cut as Jang Soo-ta**; **So Ji-sub** - **Rough Cut as Gang-pae**; Cha Seung-woo - Go Go 70s as Man-sik; Ju Ji-hoon - Antique as Kim Jin-hyeok; Song Chang-eui - Once Upon a Time in Seoul as Tae-ho	**Park Bo-young** - **Scandal Makers as Hwang Jeong-nam**; Hwang Woo-seul-hye - Crush and Blush as Lee Yoo-ri; Kim Ok-vin - The Accidental Gangster and the Mistaken Courtesan as Seol-ji; Seo Woo - Crush and Blush as Seo Jong-hee; Yoon Jung-hee - Death Bell as Choi So-young
Best Director (Film)	Best New Director (Film)
**Lee Yoon-ki** - **My Dear Enemy**; Kang Woo-suk - Public Enemy Returns; Kim Jee-woon - The Good, the Bad, the Weird; Kim Yoo-jin - The Divine Weapon; Lee Joon-ik - Sunny	**Lee Chung-ryoul** - **Old Partner**; Jang Hoon - Rough Cut; Jung Jung-hwa - Lost and Found; Kang Hyeong-cheol - Scandal Makers; Lee Kyoung-mi - Crush and Blush
Most Popular - Actor (Film)	Most Popular - Actress (Film)
**Ju Ji-hoon** - **Antique as Kim Jin-hyeok**	**Park Bo-young** - **Scandal Makers as Hwang Jeong-nam**

=== Television ===
Grand Prize (Television)
**Kim Hye-ja** - **Mom's Dead Upset**
Best Drama	Best Screenplay
**Mom's Dead Upset**; Beethoven Virus; Last Scandal; On Air; Painter of the Wind	**Yoo Hyun-mi** - **The Scales of Providence**; Hong Jin-ah, Hong Ja-ram - Beethoven Virus; Kim Eun-sook - On Air; Kim Soo-hyun - Mom's Dead Upset; Moon Hee-jung - Last Scandal
Best Educational Program	Best Entertainment Program
**Unanswered Questions** - **Choosing Dokdo**	**Gag Concert**; Golden Fishery; Good Sunday; Happy Sunday; We Got Married
Best Director (Television)	Best New Director (Television)
**Shin Woo-chul** - **On Air**; Choi Jong-soo - Gourmet; Jung Eul-young - Mom's Dead Upset; Lee Jae-gyu - Beethoven Virus; Lee Tae-gon - Last Scandal	**Boo Sung-chul** - **Star's Lover**; Jeon Chang-geun - My Precious You; Kim Do-hoon - Spotlight; Kim Kyung-hee - Life Special Investigation Team; Son Hyung-seok - Night After Night
Best Actor (Television)	Best Actress (Television)
**Kim Myung-min - Beethoven Virus as Kang Gun-woo/Kang Mae**; Lee Joon-gi - Iljimae as Lee Gyeom/Yong/Iljimae; Park Yong-ha - On Air as Lee Kyung-min; Song Il-gook - The Kingdom of The Winds as Prince Muhyul/Daemusin; Song Seung-heon - East of Eden as Lee Dong-chul	**Moon Geun-young - Painter of the Wind as Shin Yun-bok**; Han Ji-hye - East of Eden as Kim Ji-hyun; Han Ye-seul - Tazza as Lee Nan-sook/Mi-na; Kim Hye-ja - Mom's Dead Upset as Kim Han-ja; Kim Ji-soo - Women of the Sun as Shin Do-young/Kim Han-sook
Best New Actor (Television)	Best New Actress (Television)
**Lee Min-ho - Boys Over Flowers as Gu Jun-pyo**; Jung Gyu-woon - Women of the Sun as Cha Dong-woo; Kim Bum - East of Eden as 15-year-old Lee Dong-chul; Lee Sang-woo - First Wives' Club as Koo Se-joo; Um Ki-joon - Worlds Within as Song Gyu-ho	**Lim Yoona - You Are My Destiny as Jang Sae Byuk**; Han Ye-won - On Air as Cherry; Hong Ah-reum - My Precious You as Kim Bo-ri; Lee Yeon-hee - East of Eden as Gook Young-ran/Grace; Moon Chae-won - Painter of the Wind as Jung-hyang
Best Variety Performer - Male	Best Variety Performer - Female
**Kim Byung-man - Gag Concert**	**Park Mi-sun - Sunday Night**
Most Popular - Actor (Television)	Most Popular - Actress (Television)
**Kim Hyun-joong - Boys Over Flowers as Yoon Ji-hoo**	**Lim Yoona - You Are My Destiny as Jang Sae-byuk**

=== Other awards ===
- **Lifetime Achievement Award** - Lee Soon-jae
