= Oh Feel Young =

2004 South Korean television series

- Also known as: Oh! Pil-seung and Bong Soon-young; Victory, Bong Soon-young; Oh! So Young
- Hangul: 오! 필승 봉순영
- RR: O! Pilseung Bong Sunyeong
- MR: O! P'ilsŭng Pong Sunyŏng
- Genre: Romance, Comedy
- Written by: Kang Eun-kyung
- Directed by: Ji Young-soo
- Starring: Ahn Jae-wook; Chae Rim; Ryu Jin; Park Sun-young
- Country of origin: South Korea
- Original language: Korean
- No. of episodes: 16

Production
- Producers: Kim Chul-kyu; Go Byeong-cheol; Kim, Kyung Min
- Production location: Korea
- Running time: Mondays and Tuesdays at 21:55 (KST)
- Production company: Kim Jong-hak Production

Original release
- Network: Korean Broadcasting System
- Release: 13 September – 2 November 2004

Oh Feel Young (Korean: 오! 필승 봉순영; lit. Oh! Pil-seung and Bong Soon-young) is a 2004 South Korean television series starring Ahn Jae-wook, Chae Rim, Ryu Jin and Park Sun-young. It aired on KBS2 from September 13 to November 2, 2004 on Mondays and Tuesdays at 21:55 for 16 episodes.

== Plot ==
Oh Pil-seung is a free-spirited, uneducated and somewhat lazy ordinary guy. One day, he gets identified as the long-lost grandson of a wealthy CEO and finds himself heir apparent to a top-level logistics company. Pil-seung struggles to rise to the challenge of his new responsibilities with the help of his stoic and perfectly efficient secretary Noh Yoo-jung, but his snobbish rivals and detractors gleefully wait for him to screw up.

Bong Soon-young is the manager of a large discount store, and a veteran of disastrous relationships. Always wearing her heart on her sleeve, she falls for the stable, well-educated, and intelligent Yoon Jae-woong, who looks to be a perfect catch. But then she meets Pil-seung, who gets in the way of their romance. Initially annoyed at his boorish personality, as Soon-young gets to know Pil-seung, she begins to appreciate what a decent, warm-hearted human being he is.

== Cast ==
=== Main characters ===
- Ahn Jae-wook as Oh Pil-seung
- Chae Rim as Bong Soon-young
- Ryu Jin as Yoon Jae-woong
- Park Sun-young as Noh Yoo-jung

=== Supporting characters ===
- Choo Ja-hyun as Heo Song-ja
- Moon Chun-shik as Bong Jin-pyo, Soon-young's brother
- Yeo Woon-kay as Chairwoman Shin, Pil-seung's grandmother
- Jang Yong as Secretary Yoon, Jae-woong's father
- Lee Jung-gil as Bong Chang-soo, Soon-young's father
- Kim Hae-sook as Park Ok-ja, Soon-young's mother
- Kang Shin-il as Managing Director Min
- Yoon Sung-hoon as Seo Young-suk, Pil-seung's chauffeur
- Kim Seung-wook as Kim
- Lee Dal-hyung as Lee
- Shin Dong-wook
- Choi Yong-min
- Jung Suk-yong
- Lee Sung-min as Park
- Park Soo-hyun

== Awards and nominations ==
Year	Award	Category	Recipient	Result
2004	17th Grimae Awards	Best Actor	Ahn Jae-wook	Won
2004	KBS Drama Awards	Top Excellence Award, Actor	Ahn Jae-wook	Won
2004	KBS Drama Awards	Top Excellence Award, Actress	Chae Rim	Nominated
2004	KBS Drama Awards	Excellence Award, Actor	Ryu Jin	Nominated
2004	KBS Drama Awards	Excellence Award, Actress	Park Sun-young	Won
2004	KBS Drama Awards	Best Supporting Actress	Kim Hae-sook	Won
2004	KBS Drama Awards	Best Supporting Actress	Choo Ja-hyun	Nominated
2004	KBS Drama Awards	Best Couple Award	Ahn Jae-wook and Park Sun-young	Won
2005	41st Baeksang Arts Awards	Best New Director (TV)	Ji Young-soo	Nominated
