= Lee Tae-ran =

South Korean actress (born 1975)

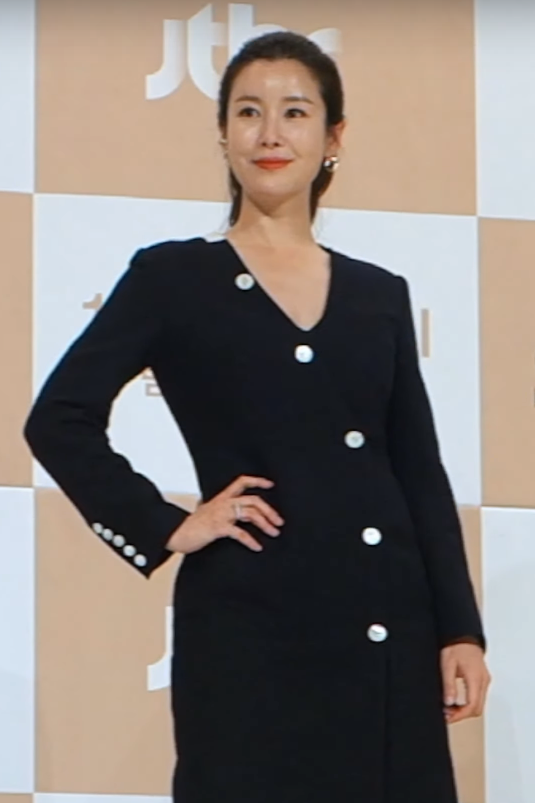
- Lee in November 2018
- Born: 25 March 1975 (age 51); Seoul, South Korea
- Education: Hanyang University
- Occupation: Actress
- Years active: 1997–present
- Agent: Hyper Story
- Height: 1.70 m (5 ft 7 in)
- Spouse: Shin Seung-hwan (m. 2014)

Korean name
- Hangul: 이태란
- RR: I Taeran
- MR: I T'aeran

Lee Tae-ran (Korean: 이태란; born 25 March 1975) is a South Korean actress currently signed under Hyper Story. She is best known for her roles in Korean dramas such as Yellow Handkerchief, My Rosy Life, Famous Princesses, Wang's Family, and Sky Castle.

== Early life and education ==
Lee Tae-ran was born in Seoul on 25 March 1975. She is the second of two daughters. Lee moved to Seoul as a child. After graduating from Haeseong International Convention High School, she worked in a company for three years and supported herself with part-time jobs at a cafe in Myeong-dong or a Japanese restaurant in Daehangno. Lee once expressed her sadness at being a mere high school graduate in a television show. In 2008, she enrolled as a theatre and film student in the College of Art in Hanyang University.

== Career ==
=== 1997–2004 ===
Lee was discovered by an agent while doing part-time jobs. She had a small role in the SBS drama The Brothers' River, marking her TV debut. Lee next entered the 1997 SBS Top Talent Competition after a friend's suggestion and won the Grand Prize. She has since appeared in many television dramas in the late 1990s, such as Fascinate My Heart, Goodbye My Love, Days of Delight and Soonpoong Clinic. For her performance in Fascinate My Heart and Days of Delight, she was honoured with 1998 SBS New Star Award and 1999 MBC New Star Award respectively.

By the early 2000s, Lee's career was gaining momentum. In 2002, she received KBS Excellence in Acting Award for her portrayal of the bubbly model Lee Ha-na in the romantic comedy Who's My Love. The following year, she landed a lead role in the well-received drama Yellow Handkerchief, co-starring Jo Min-ki. Lee received her first KBS Top Excellence in Acting Award for her portrayal of Yoon Ja-young, a designer who was dumped by her boyfriend of ten years and raised a child alone.

=== 2005–2012 ===
In 2005, she appeared in the highly popular KBS series My Rosy Life, written by Moon Young-nam, which also featured Choi Jin-sil. She earned the KBS Popularity Award for her character of Maeng Young-yi, a successful career woman who didn't believe in love. After the success of My Rosy Life, she played the lead in the KBS drama Famous Princesses, also written by Moon. The drama recorded high audience rating and garnered several award nominations and wins for its actors. Lee's portrayal of Daewi Na Seol-chil has been widely acclaimed, earning her second KBS Top Excellence in Acting Award and Best Couple Award with Park Hae-jin in 2006.

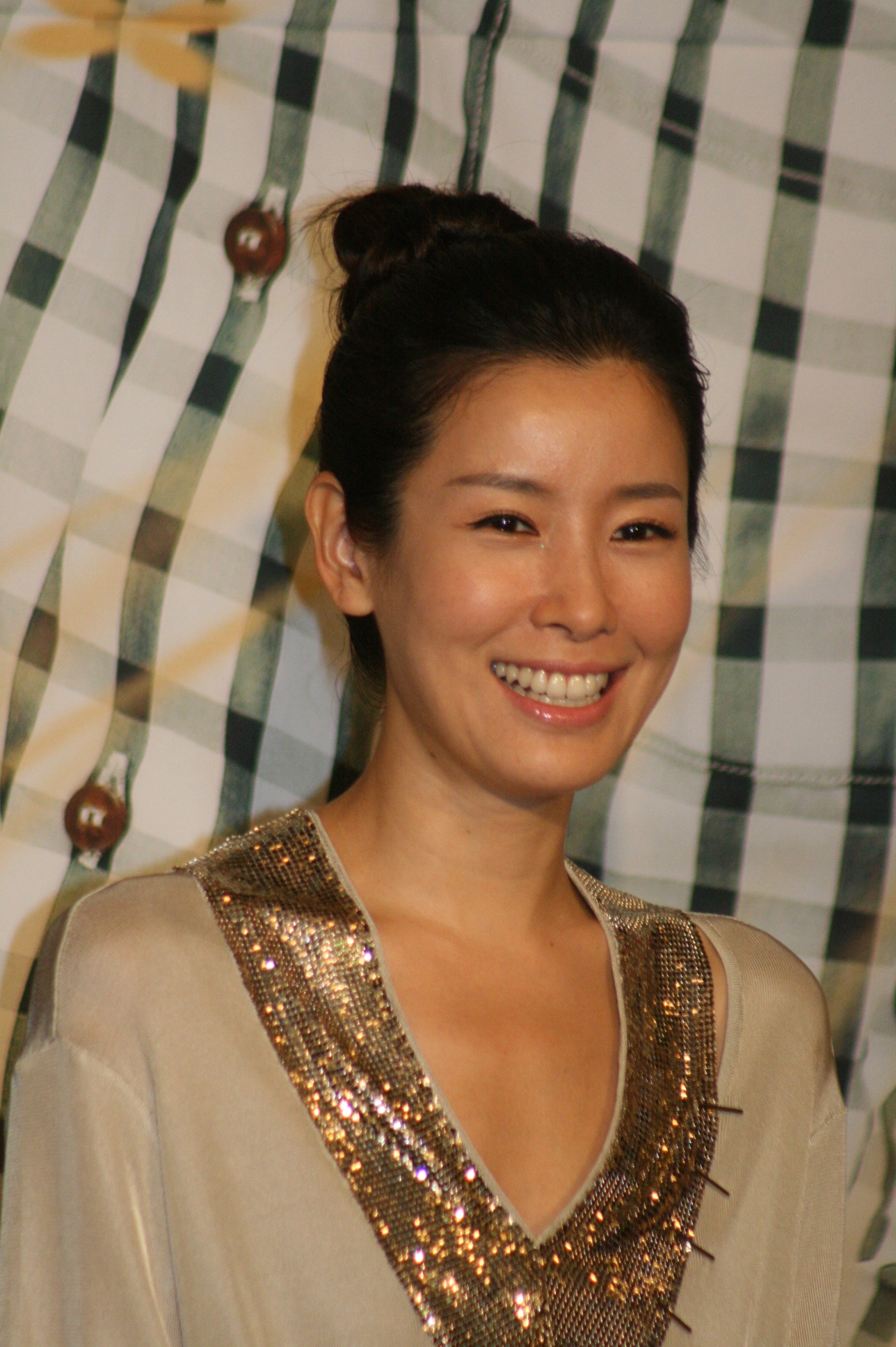
Lee at the My Precious You press conference in September 2008

Lee next starred in lead role of Jang In-ho in KBS's My Precious You alongside Kim Sung-soo in 2008. In 2010, she appeared in KBS's war drama Legend of the Patriots, opposite Choi Soo-jong, in commemoration of the 60th anniversary of the Korean War. In 2012, Lee starred in JTBC's drama How Long I've Kissed, alongside Lee Sung-jae.

=== 2013–present ===
In 2013, Lee returned to SBS in the drama Goddess of Marriage, after a three-year hiatus from major Korean TV networks. She also played the role of Wang Ho-bak in the KBS weekend drama Wang's Family, which was her third work written by Moon Young-nam.

In 2018, she starred in the hit drama Sky Castle as Lee Soo-im, a novel writer and the humble and loving housewife and stepmother in the Hwang household.

=== China ===
In conjunction with her success at home, Lee has become one of the most recognised Korean actresses in China. In 2001, she had a supporting role in CCTV's drama Modern Family, playing a Korean daughter-in-law who married into a Chinese family. Her works Yellow Handkerchief and My Rosy Life were shown on CCTV-8. In 2009, Famous Princesses was shown on Hunan Television. It became a huge hit nationwide and was voted "Overseas TV Drama of the Year". In 2010, Lee landed a lead role in the Chinese TV drama The Lure of Cloud. In 2011, she appeared in the Chinese historical drama Di Jin with Korean actor Kangta. In 2012, she had a lead role in another historical drama For the Sake of Beauty with Hong Kong actor Patrick Tam. In 2013, Lee filmed a drama The Way We Were, produced by Huayi Brothers, a big-shot Chinese entertainment agency.

=== Films ===
In 1997, Lee made her film debut in Story of A Man, opposite Choi Min-soo as the film's title character. In 2007, she starred in Love Exposure, the Korean version of Sex and the City, alongside Lee Mi-yeon. In 2012, she appeared alongside Cha In-pyo in the film My Boy, on a pro bono basis and was also involved in the production. The film made its world premiere at the 18th Busan International Film Festival in October 2013, and hit Korean theatres on 10 April 2014.

== Personal life ==
On 17 February 2014, it was announced that Lee was going to marry businessman Shin Seung-hwan. The couple wed in a private Christian ceremony at Villa de Bailey in Seoul on 1 March 2014.

== Philanthropy ==
In May 2008, Lee travelled to Nepal with the Seollebal Mountain Club to carry out volunteer work. She joined singer Lee Moon-sae, actor Park Sang-won and film director Han Ji-seung to help reconstruct a school. Lee's self-portrait, based on a photo taken in Nepal, was made public for the first time in Korea Art Summer Festival 2009. She hoped that proceeds from the sale of her painting would go to charity. In March 2009, alongside Hanyang University celebrity alumni Jang Keun-suk, Ha Seok-jin, Park Mi-sun and Jung Il-woo, Lee participated in the Blood Donation Festival "Seventy Days of Miracles", an effort to raise money for children with heart disease and other people in dire need. On 8 July 2011, Lee attended charity-sponsored fashion show and bazaar Wello! Africa, with Sistar and Jo Dong-hyuk, to promote education in Africa. The event was hosted by World Vision. In October 2012, Lee travelled to Tanzania for the filming of MBC's reality show 2012 KOICA's Dream, alongside Nichkhun, Taecyeon, Park Sung-woong, Kim Hyuk and other volunteers. It's a show where celebrities do community service work in underprivileged countries.

Lee was named an ambassador at the Mapo Happiness Sharing Food Market in 2009. She volunteers at the food market, donates rice, and also visits elderly citizens living alone, people with disabilities, and low-income families at least twice a month. Her service was recognised by the Ministry of Health and Welfare at the 4th Food Bank National Food Sharing Convention in 2010 and the 7th Food Bank National Food Sharing Convention in 2013. On 6 December 2013, she donated 2.76 tonnes of fan rice to the Mapo Happiness Sharing Food Market.

Lee arrived in Uganda in April 2014, just one month after her wedding. She travelled to remote villages where many people are suffering from elephantiasis and found it "heartbreaking". Her week-long mission was featured in "2014 SBS Hope TV", a show designed to raise awareness about the issues that Africans face, and bringing in donations at the same time.

On February 15, 2023, Lee donated 10 million won to help 2023 Turkey–Syria earthquake through Warm Day.

== Filmography ==
=== Television ===
Year	Title	Role	Network	Notes/Ref.
1997	The Brothers' River		SBS	TV debut
1997	Over the Horizon	Cho Soo-hee	SBS	
1998	Fascinate My Heart	Eun Hee-soo	SBS	Won – SBS Drama Awards: New Star Award
1998	Seven Brides		SBS	
1999	Love Now	Jang Hye-ji	SBS	
1999	Goodbye My Love	Choi Hee-jung	MBC	
1999	Days of Delight	Goo Yoo-jung	MBC	Won – MBC Drama Awards: Best New Actress
2000	Soonpoong Clinic	Oh Tae-ran	SBS	
2000	More than Love	Seo Hee-joo	MBC	
2000	All Above Eve		MBC	Cameo
2001	Hong Guk Young	Ms Seo	MBC	
2001	Navy	Park So-yeon	MBC	
2001	How Should I Be	Yoo Ri	MBC	
2001	Modern Family	Park Yeon-hee	CCTV, MBC	
2002	Who's My Love	Lee Ha-na	KBS2	Won – KBS Drama Awards: Excellence Award, Actress
2003	Yellow Handkerchief	Yoon Ja-young	KBS1	Won – KBS Drama Awards: Top Excellence Award, Actress
2003	Long Live Love	Lee Min-joo	SBS	
2004	The Woman Who Wants to Marry	Jin Soon-ae	MBC	
2005	Best Mother	Yoon So-young	SBS	
2005	My Rosy Life	Maeng Young-yi	KBS2	Won – KBS Drama Awards: Popularity Award
2006	Famous Princesses	Na Seol-chil	KBS2	Won – KBS Drama Awards: Top Excellence Award, Actress; Won – KBS Drama Awards: Best Couple Award with Park Hae-jin
2007	Several Questions That Make Us Happy		KBS2	Cameo
2008	My Precious You	Jang In-ho	KBS2	Nominated – KBS Drama Awards: Excellence Award, Actress
2010	Legend of the Patriots	Lee Soo-kyung	KBS1	Nominated – KBS Drama Awards: Excellence Award, Actress
2010	The Lure of Cloud	Shu Lin	Hunan Television	
2011	Di Jin	Jin Yuan	Shanghai East Movie Channel	
2012	How Long I've Kissed	Hong Ji-sun	JTBC	
2012	For the Sake of Beauty	Han Yingzhu	Zhejiang Television	First aired on Shanghai TV Drama Channel
2013	The Way We Were	Kazuko Miura		Post-production
2013	Goddess of Marriage	Hong Hye-jung	SBS	
2013	Wang's Family	Wang Ho-bak	KBS2	Won – KBS Drama Awards: Excellence Award, Actress
2015	Make a Woman Cry	Choi Hong-ran	MBC	
2018	Sky Castle	Lee Soo-im	JTBC	
2022	The Driver	Mi-seon	MBN	
2023	Delightfully Deceitful	Jang Kyung-ja	tvN	
2025	Our Golden Days	Go Seong-hee	KBS2	

=== Film ===
Year	Title	Role	Notes
1997	Story of A Man	Hee-kyung	Film debut
2006	My Boss, My Teacher	Mi-ran's sister	Cameo
2007	Love Exposure	Yoon Hee-soo	Nominated – 28th Blue Dragon Film Awards (2007) for Best New Actress; Nominated – 45th Grand Bell Awards (2008) for Best New Actress
2013	My Boy	I-cheon's mother	
2015	Granny's Got Talent	Mi-hee	
2015	Helios	Yoon Hee-seon	Cameo
2015	Twenty Again	Min-ha	Nominated – 53rd Grand Bell Awards (2016) for Best Actress

=== Variety show ===
Year	Title	Notes
2016	Let Me Home	MC

=== Theatre ===
Year	Title	Role	Notes
2004	Educating Rita	Rita	Stage comedy

== Other work ==
=== Music ===
==== Soundtrack appearances ====
Year	Song	Notes
2005	"Reunion"	My Rosy Life OST

=== Photo album ===
Year	Title	Notes/Ref.
2009	Butterfly · Lee Tae-ran	Shot and published in China
