= Bae Jong-ok =

South Korean actress (born 1964)

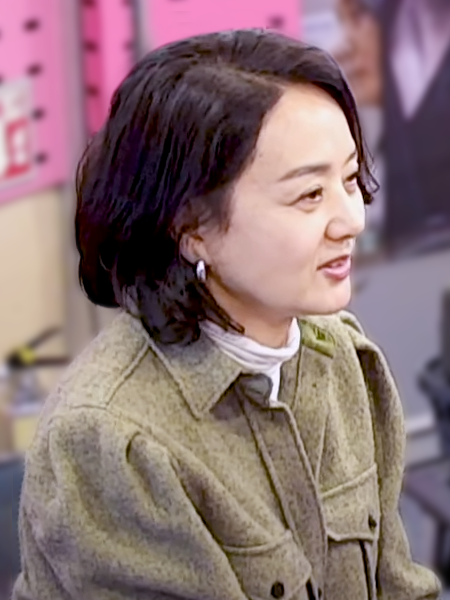
- Bae in 2020
- Born: June 22, 1964 (age 62); Mapo District, Seoul, South Korea
- Education: Chung-Ang University – Theater; Chung-Ang University Graduate School of Mass Communications – Master's degree Korea University Graduate School of Journalism and Mass Communication – Doctorate
- Occupations: Actress; professor
- Years active: 1985–present
- Agent(s): J,Wide-Company
- Spouse: Unknown (m. 1994; div. 1996)
- Children: 1

Korean name
- Hangul: 배종옥
- Hanja: 裴宗玉
- RR: Bae Jongok
- MR: Pae Chongok

Bae Jong-ok (Korean: 배종옥; born June 22, 1964) is a South Korean actress. She debuted as a TV actress after she was recruited by KBS, and has since been active in theater, film and television.

While concurrently maintaining an acting career, Bae completed a doctorate at Korea University. Her thesis was on the correlation between production crews and reactions of netizens. She has taught Theater and Film Studies at Chung-Ang University as a visiting professor since 2003.

== Personal life ==
Bae married a pilot in 1994, but the couple divorced in 1996. She has a daughter studying in the United States.

Bae adheres to a pescatarian diet.

== Filmography ==
=== Film ===
*Note: the whole list is referenced.

Feature film appearancesFeature film appearances
Year	Title		Role	Director	Notes
Year	English	Korean	Role	Director	Notes
1988	Chil-su and Man-su	칠수와 만수	Ji-na	Park Kwang-soo	Chil-su wa Man-su
1990	I Stand Up Every Day	나는 날마다 일어선다		Kang Woo-suk	Naneun nalmada il-eoseonda
1991	Passion Portrait	젊은이의 초상		Kwak Ji-kyoon	Jeolm-eun nal-ui chosang
1992	Walking All the Way to Heaven	걸어서 하늘까지	Ji-suk	Kwak Ji-kyoon	Geol-eoseo ha-neulkkaji
1997	Deep Blue	깊은 슬픔		Kwak Ji-kyoon	Gip-eun seulpeum
2001	Story of Jesus		Angel Gabriel (Korean dubbing)		Yesu
2001	My Beautiful Girl, Mari	마리 이야기	Nam-woo's Mother	Lee Sung-gang	Mari iyagi
2002	Jealousy Is My Middle Name	질투는 나의 힘	Park Sung-yeon	Park Chan-ok	Jiltu-neun Na-ui Him
2005	Hello, Brother	안녕, 형아	Mom	Im Tae-hyung	Annyeong hyeonga
2005	Love Talk	러브토크	Sunny	Lee Yoon-ki	Reobeu tokeu
2006	Ad-lib Night	아주 특별한 손님	Bo-kyung's mom (voice cameo)	Lee Yoon-ki	Aju teukbyeolhan sonnim
2006	Herb	허브	Mom	Heo In-moo	Heo-beu
2009	Five Senses of Eros: "The 33rd Man"	오감도: "33번째 남자"	Park Hwa-ran	Yoo Young-shik	Ogamdo: "33beon Namja"
2011	The Last Blossom	세상에서 가장 아름다운 이별	Kim In-hee	Min Kyu-dong	Sesangyeseo Gajang Ahreumdawoon Ilbyeon
2016	In Between Seasons	환절기	Mi-kyung	Lee Dong-eun	Hwan-jeol-gi
2017	The Chase	반드시 잡는다	Min Young-Sook	Kim Hong-sun	Ban-deu-si Jab-neun-da
2020	Innocence	결백	Chae Hwa-ja	Park Sang-hyun	Gyeol-baek
2022	Kingmaker	킹메이커	Hee-ran	Byun Sung-Hyun	Kingmeikeo

=== Television series ===
Television series appearancesTelevision series appearances
Year	Title		Role	Notes	Ref.
Year	English	Korean	Role	Notes	Ref.
1990–1992	Our Paradise	우리들의 천국			
1995	Hotel	호텔	Im Jung-bin		
1995–1996	Men of the Bath House	목욕탕집 남자들	Kim Yoon-kyung		
1997	Sea of Ambition	욕망의 바다	Jang Seo-yeon		
1997	Because I Love	사랑하니까			
1997	Jae Dong-yi	재동이			
1998	Lie	거짓말	Joo Sung-woo		
2000	Like Rainwater	빗물처럼			
2000	Wang Rung's Land	왕룽의 대지	Mi-ae		
2000	Foolish Love	바보같은 사랑	Jung Ok-hee		
2000	I Can't Stop Them	웬만해선 그들을 막을 수 없다			
2001	Tender Hearts	우리가 남인가요	Park Yoon-ju		
2002	Man in Crisis	위기의 남자	Kim Yeon-ji		
2003	While You Were Dreaming	그대 아직도 꿈꾸고 있는가	Cha Moon-kyung		
2004	More Beautiful Than a Flower	꽃보다 아름다워	Kim Mi-ok		
2005	Beating Heart	떨리는 가슴	Jong-ok		
2006	Goodbye Solo	굿바이 솔로	Oh Young-sook		
2007	My Husband's Woman	내 남자의 여자	Kim Ji-soo		
2007	Several Questions That Make Us Happy	우리를 행복하게 하는 몇 가지 질문	Na-yeon		
2008	Woman of Matchless Beauty, Park Jung-geum	천하일색 박정금	Park Jung-geum		
2008	Worlds Within	그들이 사는 세상	Yoon Young		
2010	Kim Su-ro, The Iron King	김수로	Queen Jung-gyun		
2010–2011	Pure Pumpkin Flower	호박꽃 순정	Joon-sun		
2011–2012	Bravo, My Love!	애정만만세	Oh Jung-hee		
2013	That Winter, the Wind Blows	그 겨울, 바람이 분다	Wang Hye-ji		
2013	Wonderful Mama	원더풀 마마	Yoon Bok-hee		
2014	12 Years Promise	달래 된, 장국: 12년만의 재회	Choi Go-soon		
2015	Spy	스파이	Park Hye-rim		
2015	Bubble Gum	풍선껌	Park Sun-young		
2016	Monster	몬스터	Jung Man-ok		
2017	Unknown Woman	이름 없는 여자	Hong Ji-won		
2018	Live	라이브	Ahn Jang-mi		
2019	Designated Survivor: 60 Days	60일, 지정생존자	Yoon Chan-kyung		
2019	Graceful Family	우아한 가	Han Je-Kook		
2020–2021	Mr. Queen	철인왕후	Queen Soonwon		
2021	Secret Royal Inspector & Joy	어사와 조이	Deokbong		
2022	Again My Life	어게인 마이 라이프	Chun Ho-ryung	Cameo (episode 16)	
2023	Longing for You	오랫동안 당신을 기다렸습니다	Yoo Jeong-suk		
2024	Black Out	백설공주에게 죽음을-Black Out	Ye Young-sil		
2026	The Art of Sarah	레이디 두아	Choi Chae-u		
2026	We Are All Trying Here	모두가 자신의 무가치함과 싸우고 있다	Oh Jeong-hee		

=== Television show ===
Television show appearancesTelevision series appearances
Year	Title		Role	Notes	Ref.
Year	English	Korean	Role	Notes	Ref.
2014	Roommate - Season 2	룸메이트	Cast member		
2016	King of Mask Singer	미스터리 음악쇼 복면가왕	Contestant as "Heidi, Girl of the Alps", episode 79		

== Theater ==
Theater play performances
Year	Title		Role	Venue	Date	Ref.
Year	English	Korean	Role	Venue	Date	Ref.
1995	How to Succeed in Business Without Really Trying	나도 출세할 수 있다		Daehangno Culture and Arts Center Small Theater	January 17 – February 4	
1999	Beautiful Sign	아름다운 사인		Towol Theatre of Seoul Arts Centre	November 4–24	
2004	The Story of Four Women	네 여자 이야기	Fish	Sanwoolim Small Theater	August 3 – October 10	
2009	Bakeretta!	바케레타!	Hae-joo	Daehakro Arts Theater	November 26–29	
2010	A Streetcar Named Desire	욕망이라는 이름의 전차	Blanche DuBois	Dongsoong Hall, Dongsoong Art Center	March 19 – May 23	
2012–2013	Thursday Romance	그와 그녀의 목요일	Seo Yi-kyung	Seoul Arts Center Jayu Theater	December 3–30	
2012–2013	Thursday Romance	그와 그녀의 목요일	Seo Yi-kyung	Suhyunjae Theater (DCF Daemyung Cultural Factory 3rd floor)	March 1 – May 11	
2016–2017	Secret of Flowers	꽃의 비밀	Jasmine	DCF Daemyung Culture Factory Building 1 Vivaldi Park Hall	November 29–February 5	
2018–2019	Theatre Heated Battle 7th_Third Work "Truth X Lie"	〈연극열전7〉_세 번째 작품 〈진실X거짓〉		Daehak-ro Art One Theatre 2	November 6–January 27	
2021	The Dressing Room	분장실	B	Daehakro Jayu Theater	August 7–September 12	
2022	Love Letter	러브레터	Melissa & Andy	Seoul Arts Center Jayu Theater	October 6–November 13	

== Discography ==
=== Soundtrack appearances ===
Year	Title	Notes
2007	"Moments When We're Together"	duet with Kang Hye-jung; Herb OST

== Awards and nominations ==
Year	Award	Category	Nominated work	Result
1987	KBS Drama Awards	Popularity Award		Won
1991	29th Grand Bell Awards	Best Supporting Actress	Portrait of the Days of Youth	Won
1991	12th Blue Dragon Film Awards	Best Supporting Actress	Portrait of the Days of Youth	Nominated
1991	MBC Drama Awards	Excellence Award, Actress		Won
1992	13th Blue Dragon Film Awards	Best Actress	Walking All the Way to Heaven	Nominated
1993	29th Baeksang Arts Awards	Best Actress (Film)	Walking All the Way to Heaven	Won
1993	31st Grand Bell Awards	Best Actress	Walking All the Way to Heaven	Nominated
2000	36th Baeksang Arts Awards	Best Actress (TV)	Foolish Love	Nominated
2000	KBS Drama Awards	Excellence Award, Actress	Foolish Love	Won
2003	2nd Korean Film Awards	Best Actress	Jealousy Is My Middle Name	Nominated
2003	MBC Drama Awards	Special Acting Award	While You Were Dreaming	Won
2004	KBS Drama Awards	Top Excellence Award, Actress	More Beautiful Than a Flower	Nominated
2005	30th Golden Chest International TV Festival	Best Actress	More Beautiful Than a Flower	Won
2007	8th Korea Visual Arts Festival	Photogenic Award	My Husband's Woman	Won
2007	SBS Drama Awards	Top Excellence Award, Actress	My Husband's Woman	Nominated
2007	SBS Drama Awards	PD Award	My Husband's Woman	Won
2008	2nd Korea Drama Awards	Top Excellence Award, Actress	Woman of Matchless Beauty, Park Jung-geum	Nominated
2008	MBC Drama Awards	Top Excellence Award, Actress	Woman of Matchless Beauty, Park Jung-geum	Won
2008	KBS Drama Awards	Best Supporting Actress	Worlds Within	Won
2010	SBS Drama Awards	Excellence Award, Actress in a Weekend/Daily Drama	Pure Pumpkin Flower	Nominated
2011	48th Grand Bell Awards	Best Actress	The Last Blossom	Nominated
2011	MBC Drama Awards	Golden Acting Award, Actress in a Miniseries	Bravo, My Love!	Won
2011	SBS Drama Awards	Top Excellence Award, Actress in a Weekend/Daily Drama	Pure Pumpkin Flower	Nominated
2013	SBS Drama Awards	Special Award, Actress in a Miniseries	That Winter, the Wind Blows	Nominated
2014	SBS Entertainment Awards	Best Female Newcomer in a Variety Show	Roommate	Won
2015	KBS Drama Awards	Excellence Award, Actress in a Miniseries	Spy	Nominated
2021	41st Blue Dragon Film Awards	Best Supporting Actress	Innocence	Nominated
2021	57th Baeksang Arts Awards	Best Supporting Actress (Film)	Innocence	Nominated
2021	26th Chunsa Film Art Awards	Best Supporting Actress	Innocence	Won
