= Mom's Dead Upset =

- Also known as: Mom Has Grown Horns; Angry Mom; Mommy's Angry
- Genre: Family; Comedy; Romance
- Written by: Kim Soo-hyun
- Directed by: Jung Eul-young
- Starring: Kim Hye-ja; Lee Soon-jae; Baek Il-seob; Shin Eun-kyung; Ryu Jin
- Country of origin: South Korea
- Original language: Korean
- No. of episodes: 66

Production
- Executive producer: Kim Won-yong
- Producer: Bae Kyung-soo
- Running time: Saturdays and Sundays at 19:55 (KST)
- Production company: Samhwa Networks

Original release
- Network: KBS2
- Release: February 2 – September 28, 2008

Related
- The Golden Age of Daughters-in-Law; My Precious You

Mom's Dead Upset (Korean: 엄마가 뿔났다; RR: Eommaga ppullatda; also known as Angry Mom and Mom Has Grown Horns) is a 2008 South Korean television series starring Kim Hye-ja, Lee Soon-jae, Baek Il-seob, Shin Eun-kyung, and Ryu Jin. It aired on KBS2 from February 2 to September 28, 2008 on Saturdays and Sundays at 19:55 for 66 episodes. The drama attracted record-breaking ratings, peaking at 42.7% on the September 21 episode.

Kim Hye-ja stars as a middle-aged woman who rediscovers herself by taking a one-year break and declaring independence from her family after spending decades as a housewife looking after three children, a husband and a widowed father-in-law. Her performance won the Grand Prize ("Daesang") at the 2008 KBS Drama Awards and the 2009 Baeksang Arts Awards.

== Synopsis ==
Youngil (Second child, son)

Youngil fell in love with Miyeon, and she became pregnant. Youngil was a coward about it, and did not take responsibility. Miyeon shows up at the Na household 8 months pregnant and causes a commotion. Miyeon has her baby, a son they name Ilseong, and moves into the Na household. Soon after, Youngil and Miyeon marry. Despite their chaotic beginnings, Youngil and Miyeon are a happy couple.

Hanja is not happy about this sudden change in her life, and she finds the gossiping about her out-of-wedlock grandson humiliating. But she soon learns to accept the situation and comes to feel that it is for the best. Miyeon becomes a good daughter-in-law, and becomes part of the family.

Youngmi (Youngest child, daughter)

Youngmi has been dating Jung-Hyun for two years. Jung-Hyun is so poor that when they marry, they may need to rent a small room and live on her salary, but Youngmi is willing to begin her married life under such modest circumstances. When she tells Hanja about Jung-Hyun, Hanja vehemently objects. But when Hanja later learns that Jung-Hyun is more well-to-do than she thought, she immediately warms to him. Youngmi accuses her of being shallow, and Hanja admits as much. She determines that there is nothing wrong with not wanting her kids to suffer, having been poor and knowing how bitter it can be.

It is later revealed that not only is Jung-Hyun not so poor, but that he is extremely wealthy, and he hid this fact from Youngmi because he did not want any woman to like him for his money. Youngmi is extremely insulted about being lied to. And when she learns that now it is Jung-Hyun's mother who rejects her for not being good enough, she decides her she has too much self-respect to beg for acceptance, and breaks up with Jung-Hyun. Both are devastated by the end of their romance, and Youngmi's weeping breaks her parents' heart. When Jung-Hyun starves himself in protest for four days, his mother Euna finally gives in.

Youngmi's parents and Jung-Hyun's parents have some difficulties with their class differences. While their fathers are friendly and respectful, their mothers are at odds. Euna feels that she is being charitable by allowing this marriage at all, and insists on lording it over Hanja. Hanja, on the other hand, refuses to be cowed or intimidated by her in-law's wealth.

Youngmi has a difficult time with her mother-in-law Euna, who is highly critical of Youngmi. Before the wedding, Euna takes her shopping and buys her a lot of expensive clothes, but all without asking Youngmi's opinion. Euna even takes her to a beauty salon and tries to cut Youngmi's hair short without asking Youngmi's opinion. Youngmi is so stressed out by these events and intimidated by the lavish wedding that Euna has planned that she collapses from stress-induced stomach cramps right after she takes her vows, and is forced to skip her honeymoon.

After the wedding, Youngmi is continually educated by Euna on classical music and manners. Despite being treated like a dress-up doll or a pupil, she is trying to keep her chin up, and loves her new husband a lot.

Youngsu (Oldest child, daughter)

As a successful divorce attorney, Youngsu is her family's pride and joy. She is brutally honest and has a hard-edged personality. Soured on the concept of marriage due to her work, she has remained single and at age 36, is considered an old maid in Korean culture. But she is secretly dating Jong-Won, a divorced father who is two years older than she is.

Jong-Won is not interested in marriage as well, since his first marriage ended badly. Youngsu and Jong-Won routinely joke that the best thing they like about each other is that neither want to marry. But they soon realize that they are in love with each other, and decide that they want to marry each other after all.

Their first obstacle is Jong-Won's ex-wife, Kyung-Hwa. She cheated on Jong-Won during their marriage, and demanded a divorce. Jong-Won wanted to stay together for the sake of their daughter, Sora, but finally agreed to a divorce. Both agreed to keep Kyung-Hwa's affair a secret from their parents. But now Kyung-Hwa desperately wants Jong-Won back, and uses their daughter as an excuse to invade his life and disturb his romance with Youngsu. She even lies to both their parents that it was Jong-Won who cheated on her, and begs them to help her reunite with Jong-Won.

Tired of being falsely accused of infidelity, Jong-Won finally tells the truth to their parents, that it was Kyung-Hwa who cheated. After an intense fight with her parents about this, Kyung-Hwa tries to commit suicide by crashing her car, and ends up with a broken arm. While in the hospital, Jong-Won visits her, and Kyung-Hwa tells Jong-Won that the only reason she wanted to reunite with Jong-Won was because she looked for remarriage candidates, and couldn't find one as good as Jong-Won; that she finds Jong-Won very good-looking, and makes good money. But she admits that she doesn't love him, and has decided to let him go, and even encourages him to marry Youngsu. Despite this, Kyung-Hwa refuses to go away, and even moves into the same apartment building as Jong-Won and Youngsu, and continues to sabotage them.

When Hanja discovers that Youngsu is dating someone, she is very happy, and insists that Youngsu marry him soon. Youngsu finally tells Hanja that she wants to marry Jong-Won, but that he is a divorced father. Hanja screams with grief at this revelation, and vehemently opposes this marriage. When Jong-Won visits the Na family to pay his respects, Hanja holds fast to her opposition, and even disowns Youngsu. (Iseok, on the other hand, is instantly smitten with Jong-Won's good looks.)

In the meantime, Youngsu meets Jong-Won's parents, and they like her immediately; his mother likes her honesty, and his father likes her because she looks nothing like Kyung-Hwa. Jong-Won's mother asks to meet Hanja, and although Hanja first refuses, she eventually relents. After meeting Jong-Won's mother, Hanja realizes that Jong-Won's mother is warm and kind, and that she would actually be a wonderful mother-in-law for Youngsu. After having been burned by Youngmi's stuck-up mother-in-law, Hanja is even more grateful for Jong-Won's mother. She finally consents to the marriage.

Things are still not so smooth for Youngsu. She still has to deal with Jong-Won's 9-year-old daughter, Sora, who is turning out to be a rude and manipulative child. Eunsil has an apparition where Sora attacks Youngsu's face and tries to scratch her eyes out.

== Cast ==
Il-seok's family

- Lee Soon-jae as Na Choong-bok (나충복)

82-year-old patriarch of the Na family, and widowed father of three. His children are named Il-seok ("one"-seok), I-seok ("two"-seok) and Sam-seok ("three"-seok). A wise and feisty person. Appreciates his daughter-in-law Han-ja very much, and cares about her like his own daughter.

- Baek Il-seob as Na Il-seok (나일석)

Han-ja's husband, age 62. Has a very sweet and warm personality, and lives for his family. Twin brother of I-seok.

- Kim Hye-ja as Kim Han-ja (김한자)

The titular mother of three children, age 62. Was childhood friends with I-seok, and ended up marrying his brother, Il-seok. Having married into a modest family, she worked very hard all her life. While she appreciates her husband for being a good person, she has become weary of her life, and begins to wonder what it all means. Han-ja loves to read, and probably finds her life as a housewife unsatisfying to her intellect. Aside from her general ennui, her kids begin to give her headaches with their messy love lives.

- Shin Eun-kyung as Na Young-su (나영수)

Han-ja and Il-seok's oldest child, a daughter. A divorce attorney, age 36. Jaded about marriage after handling divorces for a living, she rejects marriage and remains single to her family's consternation. Has been dating another lawyer from her firm, a divorced father.

- Kim Jung-hyun (김정현) as Na Young-il (나영일)

Han-ja and Il-seok's second child, a son, age 34. Did not do well in school and failed to go to college. Friendly and outgoing, but hot-tempered and somewhat irresponsible. Youngil also has a complex about being less educated than his sisters. Has a big-sister, little-brother dynamic with his wife. Currently owns a dry cleaning shop.

- Kim Na-woon (김나운) as Jang Mi-yeon (장미연)

Young-il's wife, age 39. Fell in love with Young-il and became pregnant, but Young-il didn't take responsibility. So Mi-yeon took matters into her own hands, and showed up at the Na household eight months pregnant, forcing the family to take notice. After giving birth to a son, Il-seong, Mi-yeon becomes a part of the household very soon. Loves Young-il very much, but often scolds him like a big sister. Mi-yeon has a cheerful, talkative personality. Her normally happy demeanor crumbles, however, when she is reminded of her sorrowful childhood.

- Lee Yu-ri (이유리) as Na Young-mi (나영미)

Han-ja and Il-seok's youngest child, a daughter, age 28. Smart, sweet, well-mannered, and proper. While usually meek and soft-spoken, Youngmi is also very proud and determined. Currently works in the publicity department for a floor manufacturing company. Has been dating her boyfriend Jung-hyun for two years, and was led to believe he was just a poor student. When they start talking about marriage, Young-mi discovers that Jung-hyun is very wealthy, and the son of her company's president.

I-seok's family

- Kang Boo-ja (강부자) as Na I-seok (나이석)

Il-seok's younger twin sister, born 20 minutes after him. A divorcee who lives with her daughter in the house next to Il-seok's. Enjoys meddling in Il-seok's family affairs, and frequently drinks and cries. A talented tailor who works out of her home, she also helps out with alterations at Young-il's dry cleaning shop.

- Kim Min-kyung (김민경) as Choi Eun-sil (최은실)

Only one month older than Young-mi, and has a close relationship with her. Stayed with her mother when her parents divorced, although her father asked her to come live with him and her brother in America. An illustrator for children's books. Has oracle talents, which her mother finds creepy.

- Im Chae-moo (임채무)

I-seok's ex-husband and Eun-sil's father.

Sam-seok's family

- Kim Sang-joong (김상중) as Na Sam-seok (나삼석)

Born 15 years after Il-seok and I-seok, and a renowned surgeon. Il-seok and Han-ja made great efforts to contribute to his upbringing, even skimping on new clothes and milk for their children so they can pay Sam-seok's tuition. I-seok adored Sam-seok since he was born, and cared for him like her own son. Despite their sacrifies, Sam-seok is not very grateful or considerate towards his older siblings.

Sam-seok married into a wealthy family, and is henpecked by his wife. Currently resides in Boston. He is torn between the guilt he feels towards Il-seok, Han-ja and I-seok, and dealing with his wife's disdain of his family.

- Ha Yoo-mi (하유미) as Lee Ji-na (이지나)

Wife of Sam-seok, 43 years old. Feels that her in-laws are inferior, and shows them no consideration.

Jin-gyu's family

- Kim Yong-gun (김용건) as Kim Jin-gyu (김진규)

A former government official from a modest background. Married into a rich family, and currently owns a floor manufacturing business. Loves his wife, but sometimes gets tired of humoring her difficult and childish personality.

- Chang Mi-hee (장미희) as Ko Eu-na (고은아)

As the daughter of a wealthy and prestigious family, Eu-na is stubborn, arrogant, and a control freak. While not truly malicious, she lives in her own bubble, and does not know how to be considerate to others. Naturally, she finds her daughter-in-law Young-mi not good enough for her son.

- Ki Tae-young (기태영) as Kim Jung-hyun (김정현)

Unlike his mother, Jung-hyun is not impressed by wealth or power. Fell in love with Young-mi because she is not vain and entitled like his mother. Although he obeyed his mother all his life, he rebels against her for the first time so that he can marry Young-mi.

Jong-won's family

- Ryu Jin (류진) as Lee Jong-won (이종원)

Young-su's boyfriend. Is a lawyer at Youngsu's firm, and also lives in the same apartment building. Tried to keep his marriage together despite his wife's extramarital affair, but now that they are divorced, feels no lingering affection for her. Disgusted with marriage in general due to his bad experience, and likes the fact that Young-su is not interested in marriage, either.

- Yang Jung-a (양정아) as Kyung-hwa (경화)

Jong-won's ex-wife. Cheated on her husband, and demanded a divorce. But currently trying to reunite with Jong-won, and uses their daughter as bait. A very manipulative, selfish, and dishonest person.

- Jo Soo-min (조수민) as Lee So-ra (이소라)

Jong-won and Kyung-hwa's 9-year-old daughter. Possibly more manipulative than her mother.

- Jung Jae-soon (정재순) as Lee Jong-won's mother (이종원의 어머니)

She is Jong-won and Sora's mother. She is a manipulative person.

== Awards and nominations ==
Year	Award	Category	Recipient	Result
2008	2nd Korea Drama Awards	Best Drama	Mom's Dead Upset	Won
2008	2nd Korea Drama Awards	Top Excellence Award, Actress	Kim Hye-ja	Nominated
2008	2nd Korea Drama Awards	Achievement Award	Baek Il-seob	Won
2008	KBS Drama Awards	Grand Prize (Daesang)	Kim Hye-ja	Won
2008	KBS Drama Awards	Top Excellence Award, Actor	Baek Il-seob	Nominated
2008	KBS Drama Awards	Top Excellence Award, Actor	Lee Soon-jae	Nominated
2008	KBS Drama Awards	Top Excellence Award, Actress	Kim Hye-ja	Nominated
2008	KBS Drama Awards	Top Excellence Award, Actress	Jang Mi-hee	Nominated
2008	KBS Drama Awards	Excellence Award, Actor in a Serial Drama	Ryu Jin	Nominated
2008	KBS Drama Awards	Excellence Award, Actress in a Serial Drama	Shin Eun-kyung	Nominated
2008	KBS Drama Awards	Best Supporting Actor	Kim Yong-gun	Won
2008	KBS Drama Awards	Best Supporting Actress	Kim Na-woon	Nominated
2008	KBS Drama Awards	Best Young Actress	Jo Soo-min	Nominated
2008	KBS Drama Awards	Best New Actor	Ki Tae-young	Nominated
2009	45th Baeksang Arts Awards	Grand Prize (Daesang) for TV	Kim Hye-ja	Won
2009	45th Baeksang Arts Awards	Best Drama	Mom's Dead Upset	Won
2009	45th Baeksang Arts Awards	Best Director (TV)	Jung Eul-young	Nominated
2009	45th Baeksang Arts Awards	Best Actress (TV)	Kim Hye-ja	Nominated
2009	45th Baeksang Arts Awards	Best Screenplay (TV)	Kim Soo-hyun	Nominated

== See also ==
- List of Korean television shows
