= Kim Yong-gun =

South Korean actor (born 1946)

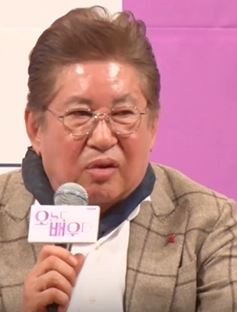
- Kim in 2019
- Born: May 8, 1946 (age 80); Gyeongseong, Southern Korea (Currently Yongsan-gu, Seoul, South Korea)
- Other name: Kim Yong-geon
- Education: Yongsan High School
- Occupation: Actor
- Years active: 1967–present
- Relatives: Ha Jung-woo (son); Cha Hyun-woo (son)

Korean name
- Hangul: 김용건
- Hanja: 金容建
- RR: Gim Yonggeon
- MR: Kim Yonggŏn

Kim Yong-gun (Korean: 김용건; born May 8, 1946) is a South Korean actor. His sons Ha Jung-woo and Cha Hyun-woo are also actors.

== Filmography ==
=== Film ===
Year	Title	Role
1969	Myeongdong Wanderer	
1975	A Man Causing a Typhoon	
1984	Gone Too Far	
1989	25 Dollar People	
1991	Milk Chocolate 1950–1990	Sung So-ah
1991	Madame Tantra	Shin Gyo-su
1992	Walking All the Way to Heaven	Jung-man
1997	Poison	
2003	Show Show Show	Yoon-hee's father
2003	The First Amendment of Korea	Oh Man-bong
2003	Love: Impossible	Government administration director
2003	Mr. Butterfly	
2003	Please Teach Me English	Na Young-ju's father
2004	100 Days with Mr. Arrogant	Ahn Hyung-jun's father
2005	Princess Aurora	Na Jae-geun
2006	Marrying the Mafia III	Jang Jeong-jong
2006	200 Pounds Beauty	Record company CEO Choi
2009	Take Off	Chairman of the organizing committee
2012	Code Name: Jackal	Angela's husband
2013	Born to Sing	CEO Hong
2013	Mr. Go	Owner of the Doosan Bears

=== Television series ===
Year	Title	Role	Network
1971	Twelve Months in a Year		MBC
1972	Stepmother		MBC
1975	Bride's Diary		MBC
1980	Who Are You		MBC
1980	Lifetime in the Country	Kim Yong-jin	MBC
1981	Tiger Teacher	Joo-hee's father	MBC
1981	1st Republic	Yun Chi-young	MBC
1983	25th Hour Ambition		MBC
1984	500 Years of Joseon – "The Ume Tree"	No Sasin	MBC
1985	500 Years of Joseon – "The Imjin War"	Yi Hang-bok	MBC
1986	500 Years of Joseon – "The Hoechun Gate"	Yi Hang-bok	MBC
1987	Album of Life	Shin Hyung-wook	MBC
1987	Beautiful Secret Love Affair		MBC
1989	500 Years of Joseon – "Pa Mun"	King Jeongjo	MBC
1989	Great Challenge		MBC
1989	Half a Failure – "Bigamy"		KBS2
1990	Rose of Betrayal	Kim Sung-joon	MBC
1990	500 Years of Joseon – "Daewongun"	Inoue Kaoru	MBC
1991	Magpie Daughter-in-law	Min-gook	MBC
1991	A Thief's Wife		KBS2
1992	Yesterday's Green Grass	Young-hwan	KBS1
1992	Reunion		SBS
1992	Wind in the Forest	PR director	KBS2
1992	4-Day Love	Yoo-jin's father	MBC
1993	Pumpkins Don't Come By The Vine	Jeon Jong-soo	MBC
1993	Sisters	Kim Yong-joo	MBC
1994	Man on the Roof		KBS1
1994	Police	Son Byung-do	KBS2
1994	The Moon of Seoul	Gigolo teacher Park	MBC
1994	MBC Best Theater – "Man Making Jogaetang"	Heo Man-pyung	MBC
1995	Creating a Song		MBC
1995	Hopefully the Sky		KBS1
1995	KBS TV Novel – "Road"	Won-young	KBS2
1995	Bold Men		KBS2
1995	Inside the Mysterious Mirror	Managing director Hwang	SBS
1995	The Season of Puberty	Jae-kyung's father	MBC
1996	Daughter-in-law's Three Kingdoms	Haejangguk restaurant kitchen assistant	KBS2
1996	Mom's Out of Town	Park Sung-il	KBS2
1996	Three Guys and Three Girls	Woo Yong-gun	MBC
1997	Palace of Dreams		SBS
1997	Third Man	Yoo Seung-tae	MBC
1997	Somehow Today Is		KBS2
1997	Legend of Heroes	Chairman Kang	MBC
1997	Wedding Dress	Ha-na's father	KBS2
1998	As We Live Our Lives	Second son-in-law	KBS1
1999	Promise	Company president Jung	SBS
1999	Into the Sunlight	Jung Young-gun	MBC
1999	Roses and Bean Sprouts	Son Dae-shik	MBC
1999	You Don't Know My Mind	Bae Dal-gun	MBC
2000	Wang Rung's Land		SBS
2000	Legends of Love		SBS
2000	Three Friends	Old bachelor Kim Yong-gun (cameo)	MBC
2000	More Than Words Can Say	Kim Chang-dae	KBS1
2001	Delicious Proposal	Jang Tae-kwang	MBC
2001	Hong Guk-young	Woo Dong-ji	MBC
2001	Four Sisters	Dr. Min Yoon-taek	MBC
2001	The Merchant	Mo Ga-bi	MBC
2001	Why Women?	Eldest son of 1st Ha son	KBS2
2002	Romance	Lee Young-kyu	MBC
2002	Trio	Choi Cheol-gon	MBC
2003	Summer Scent	Yoo Min-woo's father	KBS2
2003	Swan Lake	Choi Beon-chang	MBC
2003	Breathless	Kim Bong-soo	MBC
2003	Twenty Years	Sang-hyuk's father	SBS
2003	She's Cool!	Jang Sung-taek	KBS2
2004	Dal-rae's House	Kim Yong-gun	KBS2
2004	Precious Family	Woo Mi-yeon's father	KBS2
2005	Let's Get Married	Hong Na-young's father	MBC
2005	5th Republic	Kim Young-sam	MBC
2006	Cloud Stairs	Dr. Yoon	KBS2
2007	Moon Hee	Yoo Hyun-joong	MBC
2007	Heart of Destiny	Seo Joon-kyu	MBC
2008	Mom's Dead Upset	Kim Jin-gyu	KBS2
2008	I Love You	Na Young-hee's father	SBS
2008	Night after Night	Jang Oh-sung	MBC
2008	Temptation of Wife	Goo Young-soo	SBS
2008	Dad's Dead Upset	Kim Jin-gyu	tvN
2009	My Too Perfect Sons	Oh Young-dal	KBS2
2009	Swallow the Sun	Yoo Kang-hyun	SBS
2010	A Man Called God	Kang Tae-ho	MBC
2010	Golden Fish	Han Kyung-san	MBC
2010	Smile, Mom	Shin Ki-bong	SBS
2010	Queen of Reversals	Hwang Tae-hee's father	MBC
2011	Iron Daughters-in-Law	Moon Se-jin	MBC
2011	Ojakgyo Family	Cha Hyun-jae	KBS2
2011	Lights and Shadows	General manager Yoo Sung-joon	MBC
2012	Arang and the Magistrate	Lord Choi	MBC
2012	The Sons	Han Byung-gook	MBC
2013	Master's Sun	Joo Joong-won's father	SBS
2013	Drama Festival – "Swine Escape"	Lee Ho-yeon's father	MBC
2013	Thrice Married Woman	Kim Myung-ye	SBS
2014	Secret Affair	Seo Pil-won	JTBC
2014	Doctor Stranger	Hong Chan-sung	SBS
2014	What Happens to My Family?	Moon Tae-oh	KBS2
2014	You Are My Destiny	Jeon Ji-yeon's chaebol father (cameo, ep. 20)	MBC
2015	The Invincible Lady Cha	Oh Dong-pal	MBC
2015	Kill Me, Heal Me	Cha Geon-ho	MBC
2016	Marriage Contract	Han Seong-gook	MBC
2016	Cinderella with Four Knights	CEO Kang	tvN
2017	The Liar and His Lover	Chairman of Who Entertainment (cameo, ep. 7)	tvN
2017	The Lady in Dignity	Ahn Tae-dong	JTBC
2018	Nice Witch	Song Tae-joon	SBS
2020	Mystic Pop-up Bar	Kapeul Mart Chairman (Ep. 7)	JTBC
2024	Dog Knows Everything	Kim Yong-gun	KBS2

=== Variety shows ===
Year	Title
1994	TV Youth Cabinet
1996	The People of Geumchon's Family
2013–2014	I Live Alone
2018	Grandpas Over Flowers
2022	The President's People

=== Music video appearances ===
Year	Song title	Artist
2000	"Love Is Not for Someone"	Tae Jin-ah
2006	"Black Glasses"	Eru
2007	"Because We Are Two"	Eru

== Awards ==
Year	Award	Category	Nominated work
2001	MBC Drama Awards	Special Award	
2008	KBS Drama Awards	Best Supporting Actor	Mom's Dead Upset
2008	KBS Drama Awards	Best Couple Award with Jang Mi-hee	Mom's Dead Upset
2013	MBC Entertainment Awards	Congeniality Award	I Live Alone
