= Ryu Jin =

South Korean actor (born 1972)

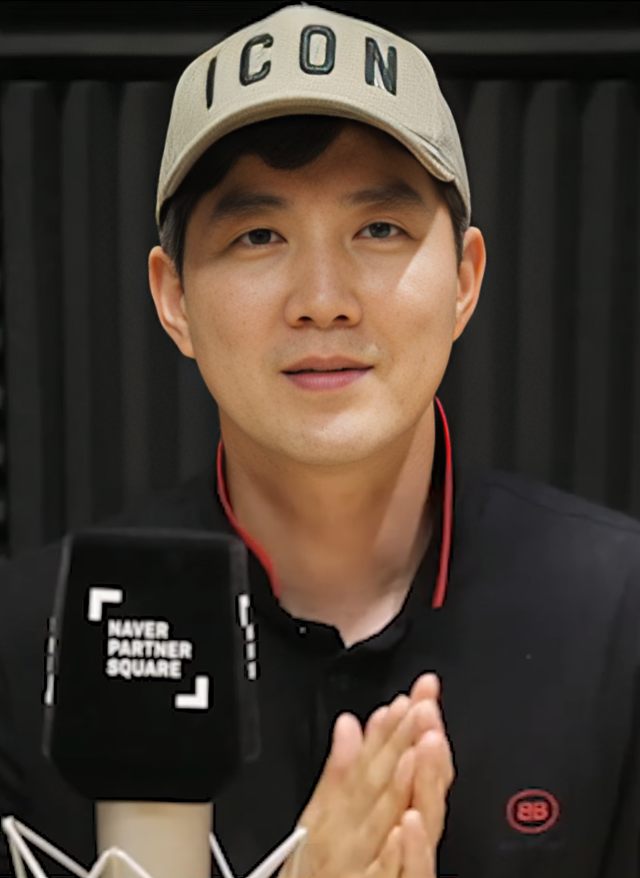
- Ryu in September 2020
- Born: Im Yoo-jin; November 16, 1972 (age 53); Seoul, South Korea
- Education: Kyungwon University - Tourism Management
- Occupation: Actor
- Years active: 1996–present
- Agent: Pan Stars Company
- Spouse: Lee Hye-sun (m. 2006)
- Children: Im Chan-hyung (b. 2007); Im Chan-ho (b. 2010)

Korean name
- Hangul: 임유진
- Hanja: 任愉鎮
- RR: Im Yujin
- MR: Im Yujin

Stage name
- Hangul: 류진
- Hanja: 柳鎮
- RR: Ryu Jin
- MR: Ryu Chin

Ryu Jin (Korean: 류진; born November 16, 1972), birth name Im Yoo-jin, is a South Korean actor.

== Filmography ==
=== Television series ===
- The Real Has Come! as Geum Sang-baek (KBS2, 2023)
- Be My Dream Family (KBS, 2021)
- Homemade Love Story as Son Jeong-hoo (KBS, 2020–21)
- Run, Jang-mi (SBS, 2014–2015)
- Into the Flames (TV Chosun, 2012)
- Prime Minister & I (KBS2, 2013–2014)
- Standby (MBC, 2012)
- A Thousand Kisses (MBC, 2011)
- Baby Faced Beauty (KBS2, 2011)
- Secret Agent Miss Oh (KBS2, 2010)
- Loving You a Thousand Times (SBS, 2009)
- General Hospital 2 (MBC, 2008)
- Formidable Rivals (KBS2, 2008) (cameo)
- Mom's Dead Upset (KBS2, 2008)
- Capital Scandal (KBS2, 2007)
- Love Truly (MBC, 2006)
- Ballad of Seodong (SBS, 2005)
- Three Leaf Clover (SBS, 2005)
- Oh! Pil-seung, Bong Soon-young (KBS2, 2004)
- War of the Roses (MBC, 2004)
- Summer Scent (KBS2, 2003)
- Trio (MBC, 2002)
- Who's My Love? (KBS2, 2002)
- Pure Heart (KBS2, 2001)
- Stock Flower (KBS2, 2001)
- Air Force (MBC, 2000)
- More Than Love (In Tae-Kang) (MBC, 2000)
- Not Anyone Can Love (MBC, 2000)
- Sunrise, Moonrise (KBS1, 1999)
- Love in 3 Colors (KBS2, 1999)
- Romance (SBS, 1998)

=== Film ===
- The Elephant on the Bike (2007)
- Dead Friend (2004)
- Deep Sorrow (1997)

=== Variety shows ===
- Daughter Thieves (๋JTBC, 2022); Cast
- Dad! Where Are We Going? Season 2 (MBC, 2014)

== Awards ==
- 2021 KBS Drama Awards :Excellence Award, Actor in a Daily Drama (Be My Dream Family)
- 2012 MBC Entertainment Awards: Popularity Award in a Sitcom/Comedy (Standby)
- 2001 KBS Drama Awards: Popularity Award (Stock Flower)
- 1999 KBS Drama Awards: Best New Actor, Photogenic Award
- 1998 SBS Drama Awards: Best New Actor (Romance)
