= Worlds Within =

2008 South Korean television series

- Promotional poster
- Hangul: 그들이 사는 세상
- Hanja: 그들이 사는 世上
- RR: Geudeuri saneun sesang
- MR: Kŭdŭri sanŭn sesang
- Genre: Romance; Drama
- Written by: Noh Hee-kyung
- Directed by: Pyo Min-soo; Kim Kyu-tae
- Starring: Song Hye-kyo; Hyun Bin
- Composer: Choi Wan-hee
- Country of origin: South Korea
- Original language: Korean
- No. of episodes: 16

Production
- Executive producer: Ahn Jae-hyung
- Producer: Hwang Eui-kyung
- Production locations: South Korea; Indonesia
- Cinematography: Kim Jae-hwan; Kang Jang-soo
- Editor: Kim Young-joo
- Camera setup: Multi-camera
- Running time: 60 minutes
- Production company: YEG Film Book

Original release
- Network: Korean Broadcasting System
- Release: October 27 – December 16, 2008

Worlds Within (Korean: 그들이 사는 세상; lit. 'The World That They Live In') is a 2008 South Korean television series starring Song Hye-kyo and Hyun Bin. It centers on the personal and professional lives of those in the broadcasting industry, offering a realistic look at Korean drama production through the work and romance of two TV directors. The series aired on KBS2 from October 27 to December 16, 2008, on Mondays and Tuesdays at 21:50 (KST) for 16 episodes.

Song previously worked with director Pyo Min-soo on Full House (2004).

== Synopsis ==
Jung Ji-oh (Hyun Bin) and Joo Joon-young (Song Hye-kyo) are two people with vastly different backgrounds. Joon-young is a daughter from a rich family who faces problems regarding her mother's gambling habits and affairs with multiple men; while Ji-oh is a son from a poor family of farmers, though he loves his mom dearly. They were lovers back in their college days, but later had a complicated break-up due to their separate relationships with other people.

When they eventually got back together, Ji-oh and Joon-young began to learn from each other and eventually Joon-young becomes more expressive, warm and understanding. However, Joon-young's mother doesn't approve of Ji-oh, due to his poor background. Ji-oh's pride is deeply wounded by the treatment of Joon-young's mother, so he decides to break up with Joon-young. Joon-young is deeply hurt and doesn't realize the reason of their break-up, and Ji-oh constantly pushes her away. Though he still loves her, he is bothered by their differences in wealth, values and personality. Later, Ji-oh suffers an eye disease which requires an operation and results in him not being able to film. Many conflicts stand in the way of Ji-oh and Joon-young, will they overcome them and make their relationship work?

== Cast ==
=== Main ===
- Song Hye-kyo as Joo Joon-young

A rookie director who is now attracting attention in broadcasting circles. She is strong-willed, grumpy and clumsy, but is honest and passionate about work and love, and has a confident and refreshing personality.

- Hyun Bin as Jung Ji-oh

A director who is sharp, full of humanity, and has a warm and passionate personality, making him the envy of his juniors. In addition, the works he directed are evaluated as being excellent in terms of viewership ratings and quality.

=== Supporting ===
==== Broadcasting Station ====
- Bae Jong-ok as Yoon Young

Her nickname among her directors, staff, and juniors is 'Grandma Devil'. She was a top actress in the past, but after several divorces, she became single again and is enjoying a second heyday in her career as an actress, as well as managing her planning and production company.

- Um Ki-joon as Song Gyu-ho

A snobbish PD who is selfish and will stop at nothing to get viewership ratings. He is the most popular PD in the three broadcasting companies. His father is a member of the National Assembly and a leading presidential candidate, and his younger brother is the head of an organized crime group. Although he is abrasive and rude, his skills are outstanding. He gradually changes when he encounters innocent and bright rookie actress Hae-jin.

- Kim Kap-soo as Kim Min-chul

Director of the drama department. At a young age, he created quality works and achieved enough viewership ratings, and even while working at the desk, he achieved both viewership ratings and artistic quality, leading to further success, and is called the best director of the broadcasting station's history.

- Kim Chang-wan as Park Hyun-sup

CP of the drama department. Although he is not of much help to the company, he is compassionate and understanding, likes to joke, and makes everyone work in a comfortable atmosphere. Thanks to this, he is popular among juniors.

- Choi Daniel as Yang Soo-kyung

He has been working as an assistant director for two years. He has a quick-tempered personality and is the same age as Joon-young.

- Lee Da-in as Kim Min-hee

Drama assistant director. She has a boyish tone, personality, and clothes. She respects Joon-young and Ji-oh.

- Youn Yuh-jung as Oh Min-suk

She started acting at a young age and is a former child actress. Although she has never been in the spotlight as she mainly works as a supporting actor, she is an actress that everyone admires for her modern acting as she gets older.

- Seo Hyo-rim as Jang Hae-jin

She is a rookie actress who just debuted, and was the president of the fan club of a celebrity she liked during her school days. She has a pure and bright personality. She changed Gyu-ho, who had a rough and rude peresonality.

- Kim Yeo-jin as Lee Seo-woo

Drama writer. She is a workaholic who does not date. She has a reputation for being meticulous in everything and writing scripts exactly on time. She is outspoken and has a unique way of speaking in daily life and scripts.

- Pan Yoo-geol as Chul-yi

Ji-oh's assistant director.

==== Others ====
- Lee Joon-hyuk as Kang Joon-gi

Joon-young's ex-boyfriend. He is a surgeon at a university hospital.

- Cha Soo-yeon as Lee Yeon-hee

Ji-oh's ex-girlfriend during college.

- Yoon Jong-hwa as Son Gyu-min

Gyu-ho's younger brother. He lives as a gangster and is admitted to a mental hospital to avoid interfering with his father, a presidential candidate.

- Oh Chang-seok as Sung So-yoo

Actor.

==== Extended ====
- Jung In-gi as a cinematographer
- Kim Young-kwang as Lee Jae-hwan
- Jung Suk-won as Yoo Chi-han
- Lee Jong-goo as Manager Song
- Kim Sung-tae
- Baek Jae-jin

=== Special appearances ===
- Na Moon-hee as Ji-oh's mother

A devoted mother to Ji-oh.

- Na Young-hee as Joon-young's mother

A cruel and immature mother.

- Kim Ji-young as Yoon Young's mother

A mother who is hospitalized with dementia.

- Lee Ho-jae as Jung Il-woo

Actor. His ailing wife is in a long-term hospital stay.

- Kim Ja-ok as Park Soo-jin

Actress. She has a backbreaking husband and son.

== Ratings ==
| Ep. | Original broadcast date | Average audience share |
| Ep. | Original broadcast date | Nielsen Korea (Nationwide) |
|---|---|---|
| Special | October 21, 2008 | 4.8% |
| 1 | October 27, 2008 | 7.1% |
| 2 | October 28, 2008 | 5.8% |
| 3 | November 3, 2008 | 5.5% |
| 4 | November 4, 2008 | 6.5% |
| 5 | November 10, 2008 | 6.2% |
| 6 | November 11, 2008 | 6.2% |
| 7 | November 17, 2008 | 5.1% |
| 8 | November 18, 2008 | 5.6% |
| 9 | November 24, 2008 | 4.8% |
| 10 | November 25, 2008 | 6.5% |
| 11 | December 1, 2008 | 6.5% |
| 12 | December 2, 2008 | 6.1% |
| 13 | December 8, 2008 | 6.5% |
| 14 | December 9, 2008 | 6.4% |
| 15 | December 15, 2008 | 6.9% |
| 16 | December 16, 2008 | 7.7% |
| Average | | 6.5% |
In the table above, the blue numbers represent the lowest ratings and the red numbers represent the highest ratings.

== Awards and nominations ==
| Year | Award | Category | Recipient | Result |
|---|---|---|---|---|
| 2008 | KBS Drama Awards | Excellence Award, Actor in a Miniseries | Hyun Bin | Nominated |
| 2008 | KBS Drama Awards | Excellence Award, Actress in a Miniseries | Song Hye-kyo | Nominated |
| 2008 | KBS Drama Awards | Best Supporting Actor | Um Ki-joon | Won |
| 2008 | KBS Drama Awards | Best Supporting Actress | Bae Jong-ok | Won |
| 2008 | KBS Drama Awards | Best New Actress | Seo Hyo-rim | Nominated |
| 2008 | KBS Drama Awards | Popularity Award, Actor | Hyun Bin | Nominated |
| 2008 | KBS Drama Awards | Popularity Award, Actress | Song Hye-kyo | Nominated |
| 2009 | 45th Baeksang Arts Awards | Best New Actor (TV) | Um Ki-joon | Nominated |
