= Love in 3 Colors =

South Korean television drama series

- Also known as: Humaneness; Heart; In Search of Love; Love of Three Colors
- Genre: Romance, Drama
- Written by: Heo Young-ok; Kim Myung-ho
- Directed by: Park Soo-dong; Lee Jae-sang
- Starring: Choi Ji-woo; Ryu Jin; Lee Hwi-hyang; Park Jin-hee
- Country of origin: South Korea
- Original language: Korean
- No. of episodes: 56

Production
- Producer: Lee Eung-jin
- Production location: South Korea
- Running time: Saturdays and Sundays at 20:00 (KST)

Original release
- Network: Korean Broadcasting System
- Release: 9 May – 14 November 1999

Love in 3 Colors (Korean: 유정; RR: Yujeong) is a 1999 South Korean television drama series produced and broadcast by KBS starring Choi Ji-woo, Ryu Jin, Lee Hwi-hyang and Park Jin-hee. It premiered on KBS2 on May 9, 1999, and ended on November 14, 1999, airing every Saturday and Sunday at 20:00 for 56 episodes.

== Story ==
The title suggests the love of the main male character to three women he loves: his mother, his older sister and future partner-in-life.

== Characters ==
- Ryu Jin as Han Jae-hyuk
- Choi Ji-woo as Eun Ji-soo
- Lee Hwi-hyang as Kim Sun-young
- Park Jin-hee as Jang Su-jin
- Kim Chan-woo as Dr. Kang Hyun-woo
- Yunjin Kim as Jang Hee-ju
- Kang Boo-ja as Park Ok-nam
- Roh Joo-hyun as President Jang Dong-wook
- Ryu Yong-jin as Yoo Jae-soo
- Jang Yong as Chief Kang Se-ho
- Kim Chang-sook as Choi Mi-ja
- Jung Joon as Kang Hyun-do
- Kim Yong-sun as Seung-hye
- Choi Chul-ho as Kim Jung-min
- Lee Byung-chul as Mr. Jang
- Bae Do-hwan as Bae Mong-gyun
- Choi Jae-won as Lee Joo-tak
- Lee Han-na as General Manager Park Myung-hae
- Sung Dong-il as Ahn Yoon-gi
- Kim Bok-hee as Lee Boo-nam
- Kim Ji-young as Yang Mi-ri
