= My Precious You =

2008 South Korean television series

- Promotional poster
- Genre: Family drama
- Created by: KBS Drama Division
- Starring: Hong Ah-reum; Kim Sung-soo; Lee Tae-ran; Ji Hyun-woo; Song Joong-ki; Yoo In-young; Hong Soo-ah; Kim Tae-ho
- Composer: Kim Hyun-cheol
- Country of origin: South Korea
- Original language: Korean
- No. of episodes: 54

Production
- Executive producer: Joonseo Han
- Producers: Lee Jeong-seop; Kim Dong Ray
- Production location: South Korea
- Running time: 70 minutes Saturdays to Sundays at 19:55 (KST)
- Production companies: KBS Drama Division; RaemongRaein Co. Ltd.

Original release
- Network: KBS2
- Release: October 4, 2008 – April 5, 2009

My Precious You (Korean: 내 사랑 금지옥엽) is a 2008 South Korean television series. It aired on KBS2 on Saturdays to Sundays at 19:55 for 54 episodes beginning October 4, 2008.

== Cast ==
=== Main ===
- Hong Ah-reum as Kim Bo-ri
- Kim Sung-soo as Lee In-ho / Jun Sul
- Lee Tae-ran as Jang In-ho
- Ji Hyun-woo as Jang Shin-ho
  - Park Joon-mok as young Shin-ho
- Song Joong-ki as Jang Jin-ho
- Yoo In-young as Baek Se-ra
- Hong Soo-ah as Baek Jae-ra
- Choi Jin-hyuk (Note: Credited as Kim Tae-ho) as Ha Dong-woo / Alex

=== Supporting cast ===
- Kim Soo-jung as Lee Ji-oo
- Park Joo-ah as Jeon Seol's grandmother
- Park In-hwan as Jang Il-nam (In Ho, Shin-ho & Jin-ho's father)
- Park Joon-gyu as Baek Joon-shik (Jae-ra & Se-ra's father)
- Park Hae-mi as Nam Joo-ri (Jae-ra & Se-ra's mother)

=== Other people ===
- Na Moon-hee as Song In-soon (Il-nam's ex-wife)
- Choi Su-rin as Seo Young-joo (In-ho's ex-wife)
- Kim San-ho as Kang Min (Young-joo's boyfriend)
- Yoon Hae-young as Park Jem-ma (radio show producer)
- Choi Ah-jin as Mi-ri (radio show gopher)
- Choi Yoon-so as Han Yoo-jin
- Choi Seung-kyung as Chef Jung-geum
- Kwon Ki-sun as In-ho's aunt
- Jang Yoo-joon as new singer Kim Ji-won
- Song Jong-ho as (In-ho's blind date)
- Kim Woo-suk as Eun Woo
- Shinee (cameo, ep 9–10)
- Oh Ji-ho as himself (cameo, eps 7, 9, 10)
- Tae Jin-ah as himself (cameo, ep 1)
- Heo Soo-kyung as herself (cameo, ep 1)
- Oh Min-suk as Jae-ra's teacher
- Song Seung-yong
