= 2006 KBS Drama Awards =

20th edition of award ceremony

- Date: December 31, 2006
- Hosted by: Tak Jae-hoon; Ryu Si-won; Choi Jung-won

Television coverage
- Network: KBS

The 2006 KBS Drama Awards was a ceremony honoring the outstanding achievement in television on the Korean Broadcasting System (KBS) network for the year of 2006. It was held on December 31, 2006, and hosted by Tak Jae-hoon, Ryu Si-won and Choi Jung-won.

== Nominations and winners ==
(Winners denoted in bold)

Grand Prize (Daesang)
**Ha Ji-won** – **Hwang Jini**
| Top Excellence Award, Actor | Top Excellence Award, Actress |
| **Ryu Soo-young** – **Seoul 1945**; **Shin Goo** – **Hearts of Nineteen**, **Seoul 1945**; Choi Soo-jong – Dae Jo-yeong; Lee Deok-hwa – Dae Jo-yeong, Golden Apple; Park In-hwan – Famous Princesses | **Lee Tae-ran** – **Famous Princesses**; Chae Shi-ra – The Invisible Man, Choi Jang-soo; Ha Ji-won – Hwang Jini; Kim Hae-sook – Famous Princesses, Spring Waltz; Na Moon-hee – Goodbye Solo, Famous Princesses |
| Excellence Award, Actor | Excellence Award, Actress |
| **Go Joo-won** – **Famous Princesses**; **Kim Jin-tae** – **Dae Jo-yeong**; Hyun Bin – The Snow Queen; Lee Jae-ryong – Goodbye Solo; Oh Man-seok – The Vineyard Man | **Choi Jung-won** – **Famous Princesses**; **Han Eun-jung** – **Seoul 1945**; Kim Min-hee – Goodbye Solo; Lee Bo-young – Mr. Goodbye; Yoon Eun-hye – The Vineyard Man |
| Excellence Award, Actor in a Short Drama | Excellence Award, Actress in a Short Drama |
| **Jung Eun-pyo** – **Drama City "Blockhead's Quadratic Equation"**; Jeong Bo-seok – Drama City "The Trunk"; Jo Hee-bong – Drama City "The Stars Shine Brightly"; Kim Kap-soo – Drama City "A Parting More Beautiful Than Love"; Lee Won-jong – Drama City "The Way Home" | **Jeon Hye-jin** – **Drama City "She's Smiling" / "Memories"**; Jeon Hye-bin – Drama City "Scrubber No. 3"; Jeon Ye-seo – Drama City "Chunyoung"; Kim Boo-sun – Drama City "Scrubber No. 3"; Kim Min-ju – Drama City "Gwija's Story" |
| Excellence Award, Actor in a One-Act/Special Drama | Excellence Award, Actress in a One-Act/Special Drama |
| **Lee Won-jong** – **HDTV Literature "Bad Story"**; Ahn Nae-sang – Drama City "A Salmon's Dream"; Kim Hong-pyo – HDTV Literature "The Flag"; Kwon Hae-hyo – Chuseok Special "A Farewell to Arms" | **Go Jung-min** – **Chuseok Special "A Farewell to Arms"**; Bang Eun-hee – HDTV Literature "Bad Story"; Jung Shi-ah – HDTV Literature "Deungshinbul (A Life-sized Buddha)"; Oh Yoon-ah – HDTV Literature "The Flag" |
| Best Supporting Actor | Best Supporting Actress |
| **Lee Han-wi** – **Hearts of Nineteen**, **Spring Waltz**; **Park Sang-myun** – **Seoul 1945**; Kang Nam-gil – Hearts of Nineteen; Noh Joo-hyun – Famous Princesses | **Jeon Mi-seon** – **Hwang Jini**; **Wang Bit-na** – **Hwang Jini**; Kim Hye-ok – Bizarre Bunch; Oh Yoon-ah – Mr. Goodbye; Yoon Mi-ra – Famous Princesses |
| Best New Actor | Best New Actress |
| **Oh Man-seok** – **The Vineyard Man**; **Park Hae-jin** – **Famous Princesses**; **Seo Ji-seok** – **Hearts of Nineteen**; Jang Keun-suk – Hwang Jini; Yoo Gun – Hello, God! | **Ku Hye-sun** – **Hearts of Nineteen**; **Lee Yoon-ji** – **Hearts of Nineteen**; **Yoon Eun-hye** – **The Vineyard Man**; Han Hyo-joo – Spring Waltz; Kim Ok-vin – Hello, God! |
| Best Young Actor | Best Young Actress |
| **Kim Seok** – **Seoul 1945**; Eun Won-jae – Spring Waltz; Lee Jae-eung – HDTV Literature "Bad Story"; Park Da-bin – Thank You Life | **Shim Eun-kyung** – **Hwang Jini**, **Drama City "Kkotnim-yi"**; Han Ye-rin – Hello, God!, Famous Princesses; Jo Soo-min – Famous Princesses, The Invisible Man, Choi Jang-soo; Ko Joo-yeon – Seoul 1945 |
| Netizen Award, Actor | Netizen Award, Actress |
| **Hyun Bin** – **The Snow Queen** | **Ha Ji-won** – **Hwang Jini** |
| Popularity Award, Actor | Popularity Award, Actress |
| **Hyun Bin** – **The Snow Queen**; **Oh Man-seok** – **The Vineyard Man**; Chun Jung-myung – Goodbye Solo; Daniel Henney – Spring Waltz; Go Joo-won – Famous Princesses; Lee Seung-gi – Famous Princesses | **Choi Jung-won** – **Famous Princesses**; **Sung Yu-ri** – **The Snow Queen**; Ha Ji-won – Hwang Jini; Ku Hye-sun – Hearts of Nineteen; Lee Yoon-ji – Hearts of Nineteen; Yoon Eun-hye – The Vineyard Man |
| Best Couple Award | Best Writer |
| **Hyun Bin** and **Sung Yu-ri** – **The Snow Queen**; **Jang Keun-suk** and **Ha Ji-won** – **Hwang Jini**; **Oh Man-seok** and **Yoon Eun-hye** – **The Vineyard Man**; **Park Hae-jin** and **Lee Tae-ran** – **Famous Princesses**; Ahn Jae-wook and Lee Bo-young – Mr. Goodbye; Choi Soo-jong and Hong Soo-hyun – Dae Jo-yeong; Choi Soo-jong and Park Ye-jin – Dae Jo-yeong; Chun Jung-myung and Yoon So-yi – Goodbye Solo; Daniel Henney and Han Hyo-joo – Spring Waltz; Go Joo-won and Choi Jung-won – Famous Princesses; Kim Ho-jin and Han Eun-jung – Seoul 1945; Kim Jaewon and Ha Ji-won – Hwang Jini; Kim Yu-seok and Yoo Ho-jeong – Thank You, My Life; Lee Jae-ryong and Kim Min-hee – Goodbye Solo; Lee Min-woo and Lee Yoon-ji – Hearts of Nineteen; Lee Seung-gi and Shin Ji-soo – Famous Princesses; Noh Joo-hyun and Yoon Mi-ra – Famous Princesses; Park Sang-myun and So Yoo-jin – Seoul 1945; Ryu Soo-young and Han Eun-jung – Seoul 1945; Seo Do-young and Han Hyo-joo – Spring Waltz; Seo Ji-seok and Ku Hye-sun – Hearts of Nineteen; Shin Goo and Yoon Hye-sook – Hearts of Nineteen; Yoo Gun and Kim Ok-vin – Hello, God!; Yoon Tae-young and So Yi-hyun – Special Crime Investigation: Murder in the Blue House; Yu Oh-seong and Chae Shi-ra – The Invisible Man, Choi Jang-soo | **Yoon Sun-joo** – **Hwang Jini** |
| Special Award | Lifetime Achievement Award |
| **Moon Young-nam** – **Screenwriter, Famous Princesses** | **Lee Dae-ro** |
