= Goodbye Solo =

Goodbye Solo may refer to:

- Goodbye Solo (film)
- Goodbye Solo (TV series)
