= Hero (2009 TV series) =

- Promotional poster for Hero
- Genre: Comedy; Action; Drama
- Written by: Park Ji-suk
- Directed by: Kim Kyung-hee; Lee Dong-yoon
- Starring: Lee Joon-gi; Yoon So-yi; Um Ki-joon; Baek Yoon-sik
- Country of origin: South Korea
- Original language: Korean
- No. of episodes: 16

Production
- Producer: Lee Jae-dong
- Running time: 70 minutes
- Production companies: Media Zoo; Union Entertainment

Original release
- Network: Munhwa Broadcasting Corporation
- Release: November 18, 2009 – January 14, 2010

Hero (Korean: 히어로) is a 2009 South Korean action-comedy television series about passionate reporters working for a third-rate newspaper who fight against corruption and inequality in society. Starring Lee Joon-gi, Yoon So-yi, Um Ki-joon and Baek Yoon-sik, it aired on MBC from November 18, 2009, to January 14, 2010, on Wednesdays and Thursdays at 21:55 for 16 episodes.

== Synopsis ==
Jin Do-hyuk (Lee Joon-gi) lost his parents at an early age after they were killed in a hit-and-run car accident. His older sister, Do-hee (Jang Young-nam), raised him, though she is immature and impulsive, and often takes Do-hyuk's money if he has any. Do-hyuk wants to become a journalist like his father, and his dream job is to work at the prestigious newspaper Daese Ilbo. But because of their poor financial situation, Do-hyuk is unable to attend college. Instead, he gets hired at the tabloid Monday Seoul, famous for its scandalous articles and ruthless paparazzi. Still, the optimistic and energetic Do-hyuk does his best and uses any means necessary to cover a story.

Joo Jae-in's (Yoon So-yi) father was a police officer who died in the line of duty when she was a young girl. Since then, she has wanted to follow in her father's footsteps, and graduates at the top of her class at the police academy. Now the lead detective of the station's homicide team, Jae-in always plays by the book. She's a bundle of contradictions: a tough cop who catches criminals with her martial arts skills, but feminine and elegant like her mother and wears pink pajamas at home; she bravely and carefully sneaks into a crime scene, but turns shy in front of her crush. Jae-in likes Kang Hye-sung (Um Ki-joon), a highly respected journalist working for the Daese Ilbo. She doesn't know quite what to make of Monday Seoul's Jin Do-hyuk, and initially ignores and despises him. But the more she gets to know him, her respect for Do-hyuk and romantic interest grows.

Quick-witted and cold-hearted Kang Hye-sung covers his newspaper's business/economy section. He is dating Choi Ho-kyung (Shin Ju-ah), the daughter of Choi Il-doo (Choi Jung-woo), president of Daese Ilbo's parent company Daese Enterprise. Often, Hye-sung spins news stories to favor Il-doo and the Daese Enterprise. Il-doo views Hye-sung somewhat like his right-hand man, and hopes that Hye-sung will someday become his son-in-law. Sure enough, he and Ho-kyung get engaged. But when Hye-sung notices Jae-in and Do-hyuk becoming closer, he starts feeling jealous.

Former mobster Jo Yong-deok (Baek Yoon-sik) was the leader of the Double Axe Gang prior to his 15-year jail sentence. His gang members have abandoned him, his wife has remarried, and he is estranged from his daughter Yu-ri (Yoon Seung-ah), a college student. On the day of his release, Yong-deok finds that the only people waiting for him outside the prison are one last loyal underling, Bong Sang-chul (Jo Kyung-hoon), and the reporter Jin Do-hyuk, who's there to interview him. With nowhere to turn to and hungry for revenge, Yong-deok suddenly decides to start his own newspaper named the Yongdeok Ilbo, which he plans to use to settle old scores with Daese Ilbo. When Monday Seoul goes out of business, Yong-deok makes the proposal that Do-hyuk join him. Filled with new dreams, passion and ambition, Do-hyuk later transforms into a reporter with a strong sense of justice, who speaks up for the downtrodden in society.

== Cast ==
=== Main ===
- Lee Joon-gi as Jin Do-hyuk
  - Seo Young-joo as young Jin Do-hyuk
- Yoon So-yi as Joo Jae-in
  - Kim Ji-won as young Joo Jae-in
- Um Ki-joon as Kang Hye-sung
- Baek Yoon-sik as Jo Yong-deok

=== Supporting ===
- Jang Young-nam as Jin Do-hee

Do-hyuk's older sister, the mother of Jin Sol and Jin Jung.

- Kim Hyang-gi as Jin Sol

10-year-old daughter of Do-hee.

- Uhm Ji-sung as Jin Jung

6-year-old son of Do-hee.

- Choi Jung-woo as Choi Il-doo

President of Daese Enterprise and owner of newspaper Daese Ilbo. He single-handedly developed Daese into one of Korea's top companies, but has his eye set on acquiring absolute power.

- Shin Ju-ah as Choi Ho-kyung

Il-doo's daughter. She was Do-hyuk's high school classmate and first love, and is engaged to Hye-sung.

- Yoon Seung-ah as Jo Yu-ri

Yong-deok's daughter.

- Joo Jin-mo as Gong Chil-sung

Second-in-command of the Double Axe Gang. Formerly a follower of Yong-deok's, he has been watching the latter carefully since Yong-deok was released from prison. Chil-sung is envious of Il-doo's trust in Hye-sung.

- Jo Yang-ja as Kim Bok-soon

Hae-sung's mother. She worries that her son's glamorous fiancée Ho-kyung is too privileged for their way of life.

- Lee Dong-hyung as Park Sang-hoon

Daese Ilbo photographer and Hye-sung's trusted sidekick.

- Lee Hye-sook as Joo Myung-hee

Jae-in's mother and the owner of Tesoro Coffee House. Myung-hee is elegant and sensitive, but a little naive. She raised Jae-in as a single mother after her husband was killed in the line of duty.

- Lee Han-wi as Na Kyung-man
- Jung Suk-yong as Cha Man-soo
- Jung Soo-young as Na Ga-yeon
- Ji Chang-wook as Park Joon-hyung
- Jin Sung as Go Eun-shik
- Jo Kyung-hoon as Bong Sang-chul
- Choi Su-rin as Madam P
- Seo Seung-man as president of Monday Seoul
- Kim Ik as Oh Jung-gil
- Choi Beom-ho as Jang Heung-gi
- Han Soo-jin as Kang So-hee
- Nam Da-reum as Choi Han-kyul
- Noh Tae-yeob as Jung-bae
- Kara (cameo)
- Bbaek Ga (cameo)

== Production ==
Kim Min-jung was originally cast as the female protagonist Joo Jae-in. But a shoulder injury during the filming of her previous project, baseball melodrama Strike Love in April 2009, developed into calcific tendinitis, a condition characterized by crystalline calcium phosphate deposits on the tendons. Kim neglected to treat it and went on to train at an action school for Hero, aggravating her condition. Despite laser therapy, 30 percent of her tendons were damaged, which caused pain and inflammation in her right arm, rendering her unable to use it. Kim withdrew from the drama one week before November 11, 2009, the supposed premiere date. This development pushed the airing date to November 18, and Kim was replaced by Yoon So-yi.

The Hero staff conducted an online contest from September 30 to October 11 for an invitation to the drama's location shoots and other promotional activities. Out of the 341 who applied, 10 Korean fans and 2 overseas fans from China and Taiwan were chosen.

== Ratings ==
Date	Episode	Nationwide	Seoul
2009-11-18	1	5.4%	9.0%
2009-11-19	2	4.9%	8.6%
2009-11-25	3	4.4%	8.7%
2009-11-26	4	3.9%	8.4%
2009-12-02	5	5.1%	9.0%
2009-12-03	6	4.7%	8.7%
2009-12-09	7	3.6%	8.2%
2009-12-10	8	4.0%	7.5%
2009-12-16	9	8.3%	8.5%
2009-12-17	10	3.8%	7.7%
2009-12-23	11	6.4%	8.4%
2009-12-24	12	5.7%	7.9%
2010-01-06	13	5.3%	9.4%
2010-01-07	14	5.0%	8.8%
2010-01-13	15	4.2%	9.7%
2010-01-14	16	4.7%	9.4%
Average		4.9%	8.6%

Source: TNS Media Korea

== Awards ==
- 2009 MBC Drama Awards: Popularity Award - Lee Joon-gi

== International broadcast ==
Though the drama received low ratings domestically, it was sold to four countries in Asia: Japan, Hong Kong, Singapore and Malaysia. Even before airing, Japanese distributor Digital Adventure purchased the rights for the drama in November 2008 upon seeing its initial script.

In Thailand, the drama aired dubbed into Thai under the title นักข่าวใจเด็ด เผ็ดแสบเต็มร้อย (Nak Khaw Jai Ded Ped Saeb Tem Roi; literally Spicy Correspondent) on the Channel 3 beginning January 26, 2014.
