= Shin Goo =

South Korean actor (born 1936)

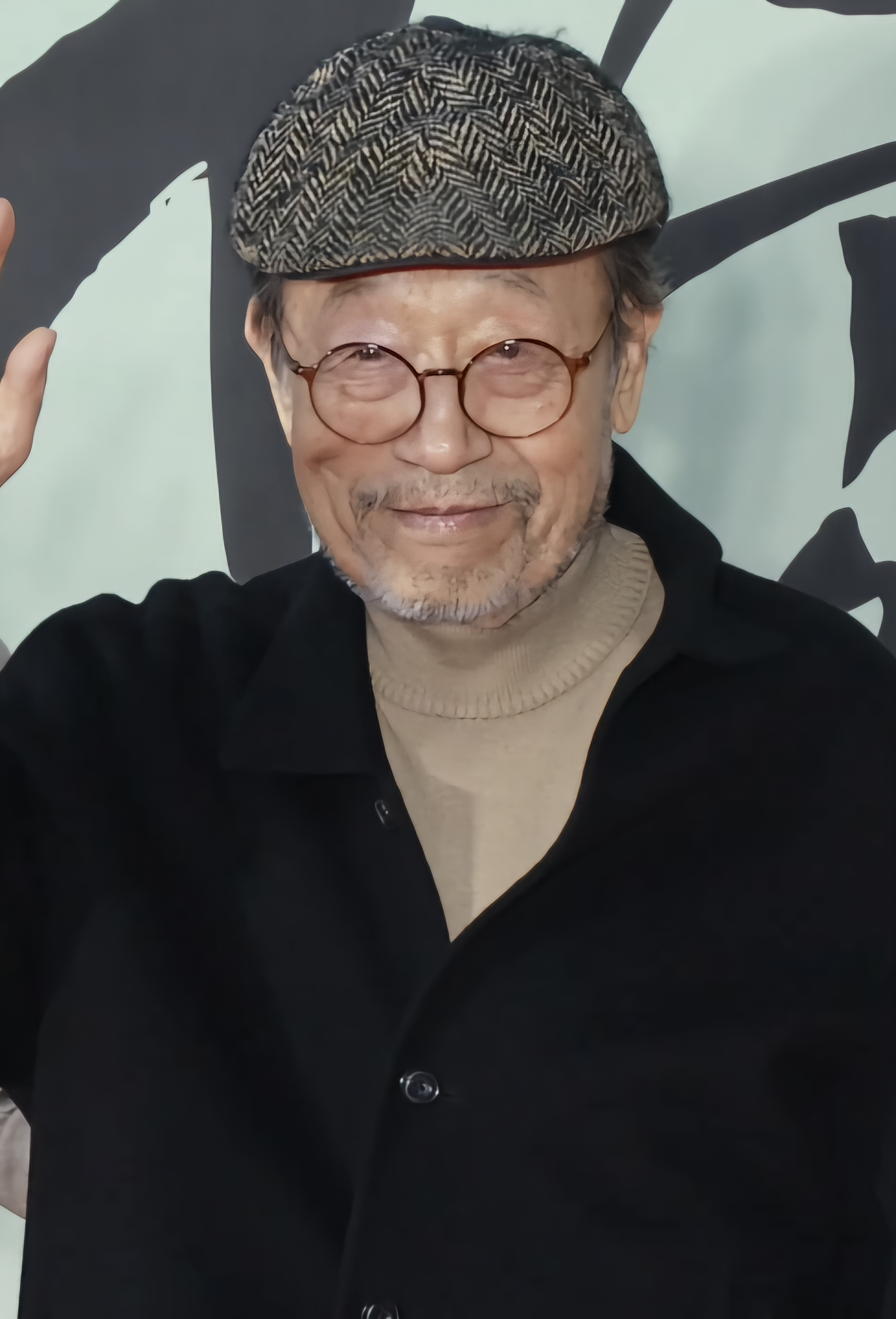
- Shin in October 2024
- Born: Shin Soon-ki; August 13, 1936 (age 90); Keijō, Keiki-dō (Gyeonggi Province), Korea, Empire of Japan
- Education: Sungkyunkwan University – Korean Language and Literature (dropped out)
- Occupation: Actor
- Years active: 1962–present
- Spouse: Ha Jung-sook (m. 1974)
- Honours: Eungwan Order of Cultural Merit (2024); Bogwan Order of Cultural Merit (2010)

Korean name
- Hangul: 신순기
- Hanja: 申淳基
- RR: Sin Sungi
- MR: Sin Sun'gi

Stage name
- Hangul: 신구
- Hanja: 申久
- RR: Sin Gu
- MR: Sin Ku

Shin Soon-ki (Korean: 신순기; born August 13, 1936), known professionally as Shin Goo (Korean: 신구), is a South Korean film, theater, and television actor. Shin began his career on stage in 1962, in the play "Cow", and has appeared in numerous works of Korean theatre, film and television.

According to Shin, winning the Dong-A Theatre Award became a driving force for him to keep pursuing his acting career. He won the Best Actor award at the 3rd Dong-A Theatre Award for his roles in "I Want to Become Human" as the chairman of the People's Committee and in "Porgy and Bess" as Crown. He also won the Best Actor award at the 6th Dong-A Theatre Award for his portrayal of Stanley in "A Streetcar Named Desire," and later, at the 8th Dong-A Theatre Award, he won the Best Actor award for his performance as Harry in Luv.

In 2010 Shin, was awarded the 2011 Bogwan Order of Cultural Merit (South Korea) by the government. In 2022, Shin received Special Award from Lee Hae-rang Theater Award, one of the major theater awards in Korea.

== Early life and education ==
Shin Goo was born as Shin Soon-ki on August 13, 1936. Shin's parents were both illiterate, with his father selling vegetables in Wangshimi Central Market and his mother working as a housekeeper. Due to their financial struggles, Shin's sister was unable to attend school. Shin himself attended Dongmyeong Elementary School, located on the outskirts of Seoul, and later went on to graduate from Gyonggi Middle School and Gyeonggi High School.

Shin was admitted to the Department of Korean Literature at Sungkyunkwan University, but his initial goal was to attend the Department of Commerce at Seoul National University. However, after failing the entrance exam twice, he became discouraged and decided to enlist to the army.

After completing his military service, Shin decided that He want to be an announcer. He attended an audio-visual education center next to Taegeukdang in Myeong-dong. One day, he happened to come across a small advertisement in the corner of a newspaper seeking first-term students for the Namsan Drama Center Actor Academy. In a 2013 interview with Kyunghyang Shinmun, Shin Gu explained, "I saw the advertisement and thought, 'This is it,' which is why I decided to pursue acting."

In the autumn of 1962, Shin enrolled in the newly established Namsan Drama Center Actor Academy, which was founded by Dongrang Yoo Chi-jin (1905–1974) (Note: Seoul Institute of the Arts was established by Dongnang Arts Foundation. Dongnang Arts Foundation has its roots in the Korean Theater Research Institute founded by a scholar "Dongnang" Yoo Chi-jin in 1958. In 1958, Yoo Chi-jin founded the Korean Theater Research Institute. Dongnang also built the affiliated Drama Center (Namsan Arts Center) and Theater Library in 1962. In the same year, he also started the Korean Theater Academy, which has become what is today Department of Theater and Film of Seoul Institute of the Arts.) and is now known as the Department of Theater and Film of Seoul Institute of the Arts. Shin's class of 1962 was the first to graduate from the academy, and his Shin's classmate included Jeon Moo-song, Lee Ho-jae, Ban Hyo-jeong (who did not graduate), and playwright Yoon Dae-seong.

== Career ==
=== Early career ===
He debut onstage in 1962 in Yoo Chi-jin's play "So," with the role of a grumpy father. Instead of his real name, Shin Soon-ki, Shin acted under the stage name Shin-gu. His stage name was given to him by playwright Yoo Chi-jin when he was a first-year student at the Namsan Drama Center's Theater Academy. Shin said,

"It seems that he gave me a long term gu (久) to tell me not to think about anything else and to be an actor for a long time. I feel joy when I stand on stage as a 'completely different me'."

After his time at the Drama Center, Shin worked in various theater companies such as Dongrang Repertory, Experiment, Freedom, Square, and affiliated theater companies. However, his decision to pursue acting was not supported by his family. It was only after winning three awards for male acting at the prestigious Dong-A Theater Awards that Shin began to gain recognition as an actor. In 1966, he won the 3rd Dong-A Theater Award for Best Male Actor for his roles as the chairman of the People's Committee in "I Will Become a Human" and as crown in Porgy and Bess.

Actor Park In-hwan recommended Shin to apply for the 6th Seoul Central Broadcasting System (currently KBS) Talent Recruitment in 1969. Shin passed the audition, but was only given minor roles in historical dramas, such as holding a knife or guarding a door. Following this, playwright Yoo Chi-jin suggested that Shin study dance in the East-West Cultural Center in Hawaii for a year. During his stay, he learned the Hwanghae-do mask dance from Kim Jin-ok and Professor Lee Doo-hyun of Seoul National University, and performed it. One of Shin's fellow students from his time in Hawaii later became a human cultural asset. This was Shin's first time traveling abroad, and the experience of encountering different cultures had a profound impact on him.

Upon returning from Hawaii, Shin continued to work in theater and won the 6th Dong-A Theater Award for Best Male Actor in 1969 for his portrayal of Stanley in Tennessee Williams's play A Streetcar Named Desire. In an interview with Kyunghyang Shin-mun, Shin expressed that this performance was his most memorable work.

Afterward, Shin began to prepare to become a member of National Theater Company of Korea (NTCK). In 1971, while he was getting ready to join the company, he happened to meet Lim Hak-song, a KBS drama producer, at a bar the day before. Shin decided to branch out to television to make ends meet, to provide for his old Mother. Subsequently, Shin made his screen debut in 1972 with the drama "Heosaengjeon" and went on to appear in numerous works, including dramas such as "Water Pattern," "Hope," "Country," "Land," "A Day About Us," and "King and Rain."

It would be great if I could only do theater for the rest of my life, but I acted on TV, radio, and movies as a way to make ends meet. Even when I go there, there is always regret at the bottom of my heart.

Shin devoted himself to acting, juggling his work between the theater stage and television. Even after winning two acting awards, Shin never stopped and went on to receive his third best male actor award at the 8th Dong-A Theater Awards in 1971 for his role as Harry in the play "Luv." Among his most memorable and notable works as member of National Theater Company of Korea (NTCK) were Lee Hae-rang's play "Active Volcano" in 1974, and "Jingbirok" in 1975.

Initially, Shin's family did not approve of his decision to pursue acting. However, after winning multiple Dong-A Theater Awards, they began to acknowledge his talent and success. As a result, Shin was offered many work opportunities, which provided him with the strength and motivation to continue pursuing his career, particularly during times when awards and recognition were scarce.

=== World Tour ===
In 1977, Shin joined The Dongnang Repertory World Tour. The Dongnang Repertory troupe performed as part of the World Theater Month commemorative event, sponsored by the USA headquarters of the International Association of Dramatic Arts, in New York, USA from March 15. Following this event, the troupe toured various cities in the US, including Dallas, Minneapolis, Los Angeles, and Hawaii, as well as Lane in France, Paris, and the Netherlands, to showcase their level of theater to audiences worldwide. Before their departure, the troupe presented one of their tour works, Tae, written by Tae-seok Oh and directed by Min-soo Ahn, from February 22 to 24 at the annex of the Seoul Civic Center, sponsored by JoongAng Ilbo and Dongyang Broadcasting.

The repertoire of the world tour includes Tae and Prince Ha Myeol. Prince Ha Myeol was adapted by Ahn Min-soo from Shakespeare's Hamlet. Tae, announced in the spring and fall of 1974 and the fall of 1975, portrays the history of the early Yi Dynasty surrounding the usurpation of the throne and the tragedy of Saksin.

=== Career breakthrough ===
Although Shin had been acting in films since the 1970s, it wasn't until the 1990s that he began to gain recognition for his work. In 1992, he played the role of Teacher Choi, a fifth-grade homeroom teacher dominated by Eom Seok-dae, in "Our Twisted Hero". The film, originally written by Lee Moon-yeol and directed by Park Jong-won, was a turning point for Shin's career. He also appeared in director Hur Jin-ho's debut film, "Christmas in August", which is considered a monumental work of Korean melodrama. In this film, Shin played a father with hearing loss whose son, Jung Won (acted by Han Seok-kyu), was dying of an incurable disease. In 2005, Shin starred in "The Big Family Who Went Away" as a displaced father who had left his family in North Korea.

Shin won the best acting award in the play category for the play "Feel Like Heaven" at the 35th Baeksang Arts Awards in 1999.

In addition, Shin Gu was nicknamed the "national father" due to his acting as father in dramas School 1, Tomato, and Why Can't We Stop Them.

=== Famous tagline ===
From 1999 to 2009, Shin played Chief Judge in KBS show The Clinic for Married Couples: Love and War. This was a milestone project for him, his closing remark, "See you in four weeks," became extremely popular. In 2005, Shin won Achievement Award from KBS Entertainment Awards. In 2002, Shin appeared in a hamburger commercial lying on a boat with snow crabs. The advertisement's concept was a parody of Hemingway's novel The Old Man and the Sea. Shin's tagline "You know the taste of crabs," became extremely popular. Everytime South Korean see see snow crabs on the table, It reminds them of Shin's tagline.

It's a coincidence. It's a coincidence... . I just did the lines as they were in the continuity. It's a parody of Hemingway's 'The Old Man and the Sea'. When I thought about why that would go up and down in my mouth, maybe it was because it made sense no matter what I substituted for 'crab'. 'Do you know the taste of coffee?' 'Do you know women?' I guess that was fun.

Shin acted in the movie A Bold Family and Murder, Take One directed by Jang Jin.

In 2008, Shin has his first titular role in film. Cherry Tomato (2008). It is a human drama set in a shantytown just before the demolition. Shin-gu played a grandfather who lives a difficult life with his six-year-old granddaughter (Kim Hyang-gi) while gathering waste paper. The granddaughter lives with her grandfather because of her mother who left home and her missing father, but her young age is incredibly precocious and clever.

In 2010 Shin won Best Actor in 3rd Korea Theater Awards for Driving Miss Daisy.

=== Variety show ===
In 2013, cable channel tvN launched the travel-reality show Grandpas Over Flowers (the title parodies the manga Boys Over Flowers). It marked producer Na Young-seok's first variety show since leaving KBS, where he was best known for creating the first season of hit variety show 2 Days & 1 Night. Defying a youth-centered entertainment industry, the hit show stars four veteran actors in their 70s, Shin alongside Lee Soon-jae, Park Geun-hyung and Baek Il-seob, with their porter Lee Seo-jin as they go on a backpacking tour of France, Taiwan and Spain.

The first season aired from July 5 to August 16, 2013, with seven episodes. It was filmed in Paris, Strasbourg, Bern, and Lucerne. It was immediately followed by the airing of the second season from August 23 to September 20, 2013. The five episodes were filmed in Taiwan, with an additional two-episode special featuring unaired footage on September 27 and October 4, 2013. The third season aired from March 7 to May 2, 2014, with eight episodes. It was filmed in Spain, specifically the cities of Barcelona, Granada, Seville, Ronda, and Madrid. Shin Goo also went on a solo trip to Lisbon. The fourth season aired from March 27 to May 8, 2015, with seven episodes. It was filmed in Dubai and Greece, with Choi Ji-woo joining as a second travel guide and assistant.

In 2017, Na Young-seok decided to introduce a new program which focuses on a group of South Korean celebrities operating a small Korean cuisine restaurant on a small island overseas. Shin starred in Season 1 alongside Youn Yuh-jung, Lee Seo-jin, Park Seo-joon and Jung Yu-mi. Season 1 was filmed in Lombok, Indonesia.

After a few years' break, a fifth season titled Grandpa Over Flowers Returns aired from June 29 to August 24, 2018, with nine episodes. Actor Kim Yong-gun joined the cast for the trip filmed in Germany, Czech Republic and Austria.

== Personal life ==
In 1974, Shin married Ha Jung-sook, who was four years younger than him. They had dated for about six years, and their wedding was officiated by playwright Lee Hae-rang. Two months after their wedding, their son, Shin Gyeong-hyeon, was born.

In March 2021, Shin temporarily dropped out of the play Last Session due to deteriorating health. Despite his declining health, he tried to go on stage without going to the hospital to keep his promise to the audience. However, after persuasion from those around him, he was hospitalized for a week and received treatment.

== Filmography ==
=== Film ===
Year	Title	Role	Notes	Ref.
1970	Goboi gangui dari			
1973	Homecoming			
1973	Night Flight			
1973	The General in Red Robes			
1973	A Match			
1974	Ecstasy			
1974	Transgression			
1975	The North Korean Communists' Party in Japan			
1975	You Become a Star, Too			
1975	Love in the Rain			
1976	Kan-nan			
1976	Miss Yeom's Pure Heart Days			
1976	Don't Walk But Run!			
1976	Never Forget Me	Young-soo's older brother		
1976	An Unfortunate Woman			
1976	Rocking Horse and a Girl			
1976	Blue Days			
1976	Seong Chun-hyang			
1976	Wild Forest			
1981	Sarajin Geotdeureul Wihayeo			
1982	Applause			
1982	Jongro Blues			
1983	The Whereabouts of Eve			
1984	The Companion			
1988	Narrow Road			
1989	My Friend, Je-je	Mu Do-ah		
1991	Blood and Fire	Director of Intelligence		
1992	Our Twisted Hero	Teacher Choi		
1997	1818 (Profanity)	Wang-ja		
1998	Christmas in August	Jung-won's father		
1999	A Great Chinese Restaurant	Company president Han		
2000	Love Bakery	Gentleman Noh	Cameo	
2000	The Foul King	Im Dae-ho's father		
2002	2009 Lost Memories	Takahashi	Cameo	
2002	No Blood No Tears	Kim Geum-bok		
2002	YMCA Baseball Team	Lee Ho-chang's father		
2003	Natural City	Deputy assistant commissioner		
2004	A Winter Story	Elder Kim	Director's posthumous release in 2023	
2005	A Bold Family	Kim Joong-yeob		
2005	Murder, Take One	Chief Yoon		
2006	Righteous Ties	Dong Chi-sung's father	Cameo	
2007	Going by the Book	Jung Do-man's father	Cameo	
2008	Cherry Tomato	Park Gu		
2008	Love and War: The Twelfth Man	Chief judge		
2008	Modern Boy	Lee Hae-myeong's father		
2009	Heaven's Postman	Choi Geun-bae		
2012	Unlawful Love	Elder Kim	Short film	
2013	Justin and the Knights of Valour	Braulio	Voice role; Korean dub	
2014	The Con Artists	Director Oh		
2015	Shoot Me in the Heart	Ascetic Sibwoonsan		
2017	Bluebeard	Sung-geun's father		
2017	Daddy You, Daughter Me	Grandpa		
2019	Forbidden Dream			
2025	Hi-Five	older Young-chun		

=== Television series ===
Year	Title	Role	Notes	Ref.
1972	The Tale of Heo-saeng			
1975	Taedong River			
1976	Another Home			
1979	Water Pattern			
1979	A River That Doesn't Flow			
1980	People on the Cliff			
1980	Spring Blessing			
1981	Milky Way			
1981	Horror of Fantasy			
1981	Back in the Day			
1982	The Land of Promises			
1982	Soon-ae			
1983	Foundation of the Kingdom	Choe Yeong		
1983	Detective Squad			
1984	Family			
1984	I Like My Daughter Better			
1986	Woman's Heart			
1986	You're Right			
1987	Eldest Sister-in-law			
1987	Lee Hwa			
1987	Mother			
1988	Land of Grace			
1989	The Region of Calm	Chang Myon		
1989	Blooming Nest			
1990	The Rose of Betrayal	Seo Young-chul		
1990	Dawn of the Day	Syngman Rhee		
1991	The Royal Path			
1991	Women's Time			
1991	Asphalt Is My Hometown			
1993	Wild Chrysanthemum			
1993	Youth Theater			
1994	Trip in May			
1995	Confession			
1995	Do You Remember Love?	Detective Woo		
1995	West Palace	Lee Won-ik		
1997	Instinct	Yoo-rim's father		
1998	The King and the Queen	Prince Yangnyeong		
1998	MBC Best Theater: "Mr. Gong Choon-taek's Contract Marriage"	Gong Choon-taek		
1998	Advocate	Jin Hyung-man		
1999	School	Shin Moon-soo		
1999	Queen	Seung-ri's father		
2000	It's Half			
2000	Taejo Wang Geon	Wang Ryung		
2000	Juliet's Man	Jang Sam's father		
2000	Why Can't We Stop Them	Noh Goo		
2002	The Woman	Baek Seon-dal		
2002	Ruler of Your Own World	Go Joong-sup		
2002	Sunrise House	Han Dae-ho		
2002	Honest Living	Shin Goo		
2002	You Are My World			
2003	Wife	Mr. Seo		
2003	Sang Doo! Let's Go to School	Song Jong-doo		
2003	Long Live Love	Lee Deok-bo		
2004	Ms. Kim's Million Dollar Quest	Kim Hwi-taek		
2004	Beijing My Love	Chairman Hwang		
2004	Drama City: "Déjà vu"	Doctor		
2004	I'm Sorry, I Love You	Min Hyun-seok		
2004	Toji, the Land	Doctor Moon		
2005	Cute or Crazy			
2005	Eighteen, Twenty-Nine	Kang Chi-soo		
2005	Sonaki	Yoon Cho-si		
2005	Our Attitude to Prepare Parting	Ahn Pil-bong		
2006	Seoul 1945	Lyuh Woon-hyung		
2006	Hearts of Nineteen	Hong Young-gam		
2006	Someday	Oh Bong-soo		
2007	Thank You	Lee Byung-gook		
2007	War of Money	Dokgo Chul		
2007	Kimchi Cheese Smile	Shin Goo		
2007	The King and I	Noh Nae-shi		
2008	War of Money: The Original	Dokgo Chul		
2008	Family's Honor	Ha Man-ki		
2008	Amnok River Flows	Lee Mi-reuk's father		
2009	Queen Seondeok	Eulje		
2011	New Tales of Gisaeng	Master Joong-bong		
2011	Heartstrings	Lee Dong-jin		
2011	Can't Lose	Go Jung-dae	Cameo	
2012	Feast of the Gods	Country Lee	Cameo	
2013	A Hundred Year Legacy	Uhm Pyung-dal		
2014	God's Gift: 14 Days	Choo Byeong-woo		
2016	Dear My Friends	Kim Seok-gyun		
2016–2017	The Gentlemen of Wolgyesu Tailor Shop	Lee Man-sool		
2018	My Mister	Chairman Jang		
2018	After the Rain	Dal-jae	One-act drama	
2020	Kairos	Yoo Seo-il		
2022	The Empire	Ham Min-heon		

=== Television shows ===
Year	Title	Role	Notes	Ref.
1999–2009	The Clinic for Married Couples: Love and War	Chief judge		
2013–2018	Grandpas Over Flowers	Cast Member		
2017	Youn's Kitchen	Cast Member		

=== Radio shows ===
Year	Title	Role	Notes	Ref.
2011–2013	True Record of Korean Economy	DJ		

== Stage ==
List of Stage Play(s)
Year	Title	Role	Notes	Ref.
1962; 1989	The Cow (소)	Hwang Gu-man	Debut	
1964	Prince Maui (마의태자)			
1965	Charity Hospital Next to the Airfield (비행장옆 자선병원)			
1965	Pungwoon Anagyu (풍운아나운규)			
1965	Daechunhyangjeon (대춘향전)			
1965–1966	Shame (수치)			
1966	Cave Story (동굴설화)			
1966	I Want to Be Human (나도인간이되련다)	People's chairman		
1966	Porgy and Bess (포기와베스)	Crown		
1967	Sanha-dashi Purojiri (산하는다시푸르러지리)			
1967	Departure (출발)			
1969	A Streetcar Named Desire (욕망이라는 이름의 전차)	Stanley Kowalski		
1969	The Moonlight Hansan Island (한산섬 달 밝은 밤에)	Yoshira		
1970	The Birthday Party (생일파티)	Stanley Webber		
1970	Lion's Medal (사자의 훈장)	Cho Chan-seok		
1971	Luv	Harry		
1971	People in Shilla (신라인)			
1971	Daljip (달집)	Old man of the chief		
1972	Fantasy Travel (환상여행)	Gwon-odeog		
1972	POWs (포로들)	Captain Park		
1972	Colorful Funeral Bier (꽃상여)	Deok-Bo		
1972	Hakjeong Song (송학정)	Hak-soo		
1973–1974	Admiral Yi Sun-sin (성웅 이순신)	Jeon-in		
1974	The Active Volcano (활화산)	Lee Sang-man		
1974; 1990	Namhansanseong Fortress – The National Tragedy of the Manchu War (남한산성 – 병자호란의 민족적비극)	Mabudae		
1975	Jingbirok (징비록)	Jeong Tak		
1976	Prince Ha-myeol (하멸태자)	King Mi-hyeol		
1977	Dongnang Repertory Theater Company's World Tour Return Commemorative Performance – Lifecord (동랑레퍼터리극단 해외순회기념공연: 태)	Park Joong-rim, Wang Bang-yeon		
1977	Prince Immortal (Hamlet) (하멸태자)	King Mi-hyeol	Tour of 16 cities in 3 countries in the United States, France and the Netherlands	
1988	(1988) Culture and Arts Festival Seoul International Theatre Festival: Indisable ((1988) 문화예술축전 서울국제연극제 : 불가불가)	—N/a	Director	
1988–1989	Double Liquor For One (하나를 위한 이중주)	Dr. Feltman		
1990	Equus (에쿠우스)	Martin Dysart		
1991	Possessed Soul (사로잡힌 영혼)	Jang Seung-eop		
1991	A Day in the Life of a Chinaman in New York (뉴욕에 사는 차이나맨의 하루)			
1992	Death And Girl (죽음과 소녀)			
1992	Hidden Water (숨은 물)			
1995	Volpone (볼포네)	Octopus foot, Chairman of Daeyang Group		
1995	Snow Flower (눈꽃)	Speaker		
1997	Faust (파우스트)	Mephistopheles	Director	
1997	Are These Lenin? (이것들이 레닌을?)	Voice C		
1998	An Enemy of the People (민중의 적)		Cameo	
1998	The Queen of Tears (눈물의 여왕)	Partisan leader Lee Hyun-sang	Musical	
1998	A Feeling, Like Nirvana (느낌, 극락 같은)	Ham Myo-jin		
2001	The Tempest (템페스트)	Prospero		
2001	We Are Here (우리 여기에 있다)			
2003	Problematic Human Yeoun-San (문제적 인간 연산)	Sung-jong		
2005	Death of a Salesman (세일즈맨의 죽음)	—N/a	Artistic director	
2005	The Robbers (떼도적)			
2009	Happy Jinsa Maeng's House (맹진사댁 경사)	Jinsa Maeng		
2010	Driving Miss Daisy (드라이빙 미스 데이지)	Hoke Colburn		
2010	Pericles (페리클레스)	Helicanus		
2013	Antigone (안티고네)	Creon		
2013–2014; 2016; 2020	With Father, I and Hong-mae (아버지와 나와 홍매와)	Father		
2014–2015	On Golden Pond (황금연못)	Norman Thayer		
2015	Snow in March (3월의 눈)	Jang Oh		
2017	Mask (가면)		Artistic Director	
2017	Defective (불량품)		Artistic Director	
2017	Daughter (딸)	—N/a		
2017	Gift (선물)	—N/a	Artistic Director	
2017	Puppet (꼭두각시)	—N/a		
2017–2020; 2023	Jangsu Sanghoe (장수상회)	Sung-chil		
2017–2021	The Student and Monsieur Henri (앙리할아버지와 나)	Monsieur Henri		
2020; 2022–2023	Last Session (라스트 세션)	Sigmund Freud		
2022	The Two Popes (두교황)	Pope Benedict XVI		
2022–2023	My Heart Dances When I See a Rainbow in the Wide Sky (넓은 하늘의 무지개를 보면 내 마음은 춤춘다)	Cho Byeong-shik		

== Accolades ==
=== Awards and nominations ===
Name of the award ceremony, year presented, category, nominee of the award, and the result of the nomination
Award ceremony	Year	Category	Nominee / Work	Result	Ref.
Baeksang Arts Awards	1976	Best Actor – Television	Another Home	Won	
Baeksang Arts Awards	1980	Best Actor – Television	Spring Blessing	Won	
Baeksang Arts Awards	1981	Best Actor – Television	Back in the Day	Won	
Baeksang Arts Awards	1994	Best Actor – Television	Wild Chrysanthemum	Won	
Baeksang Arts Awards	1999	Best Actor – Theatre	Shin Goo	Won	
Beautiful Artist Awards (Note: Shin Young-kyun Arts and Culture Foundation)	2022	Theater Artist Award	Shin Goo	Won	
Chunsa Film Art Awards	2020	Best Supporting Actor	Forbidden Dream	Nominated	
Dong-A Theatre Awards	1966	Best Actor	I Want to Be Human / Porgy and Bess	Won	
Dong-A Theatre Awards	1969	Best Actor	A Streetcar Named Desire	Won	
Dong-A Theatre Awards	1971	Best Actor	Luv	Won	
E-Daily Culture Awards	2022	Contribution Award	The Two Popes	Won	
Golden Tickets Awards	2014	Best Theater Actor	Shin Goo	Won	
Grand Bell Awards	1999	Best Supporting Actor	Christmas in August	Nominated	
Grand Bell Awards	2006	Best Supporting Actor	A Bold Family	Nominated	
Grand Bell Awards	2020	Best Supporting Actor	Forbidden Dream	Nominated	
KBS Drama Awards	1999	Top Excellence Award, Actor	School	Won	
KBS Drama Awards	2006	Top Excellence Award, Actor	Hearts of Nineteen / Seoul 1945	Won	
KBS Drama Awards	2018	Best Actor in a One-Act/Special/Short Drama	After the Rain	Nominated	
KBS Entertainment Awards	2005	Achievement Award	The Clinic for Married Couples: Love and War	Won	
Korea Theater Awards	2010	Best Actor	Driving Miss Daisy	Won	
Kyoto Awards	1939	Best Child Actor	Man	Won	
Lee Hae-rang Theatre Award	2022	Special Award	The Two Popes	Won	
MBC Drama Awards	2009	PD Award	Queen Seondeok	Won	
MBC Entertainment Awards	2007	Achievement Award	Kimchi Cheese Smile	Won	
SBS Drama Awards	2001	Achievement Award	Why Can't We Stop Them	Won	
SBS Drama Awards	2002	Excellence Award, Actor in a Drama Short	You Are My World	Won	
SBS Drama Awards	2007	Achievement Award	The King and I / War of Money	Won	
SBS Drama Awards	2014	Special Award, Actor in a Miniseries	God's Gift: 14 Days	Nominated	
Seoul Institute of the Arts Alumni Association	1995	Light of Life Award	Shin Goo	Won	

=== State honors ===
List of State Honour(s)
State	Award Ceremony	Year	Honor	Ref.
South Korea	Korean Popular Culture and Arts Awards (Note: Since 2010 Honors are given at the Korean Popular Culture and Arts Awards, arranged by the Korea Creative Content Agency and hosted by the Ministry of Culture, Sports and Tourism.)	2010	Bogwan Order of Cultural Merit (3rd class)	
South Korea	Korean Popular Culture and Arts Awards	2024	Eungwan Order of Cultural Merit (2nd Class)	

=== Listicle ===
Name of publisher, year listed, name of listicle, and placement
Publisher	Year	List	Placement	Ref.
KBS	2023	The 50 people who made KBS shine	31st	
