= Hidden Identity (TV series) =

- Promotional poster
- Also known as: Hide Your Identity
- Genre: Police procedural Action; Thriller
- Created by: Jinnie Choi; Park Ji-young
- Written by: Kang Hyun-sung
- Directed by: Kim Jung-min; Shin Yong-hwi
- Starring: Kim Bum; Park Sung-woong; Yoon So-yi; Lee Won-jong
- Music by: Kim Jang-woo
- Country of origin: South Korea
- Original language: Korean
- No. of episodes: 16

Production
- Executive producers: Lee Hyang-bong; Park Ho-shik
- Producers: Hwang Joon-hyeok; Jo Eun-sol
- Production location: South Korea
- Cinematography: Han Dong-hwa; Lee Jong-ho
- Editors: Choi Min-young; Choi Gyeong-yoon
- Running time: 60 minutes
- Production company: Neo Entertainment

Original release
- Network: tvN
- Release: June 16 – August 4, 2015

Hidden Identity (Korean: 신분을 숨겨라; RR: Sinbuneul sumgyeora) is a 2015 South Korean television series starring Kim Bum, Park Sung-woong, Yoon So-yi and Lee Won-jong. It aired on tvN from June 16 to August 4, 2015, on Mondays and Tuesdays at 23:00 (KST) for 16 episodes.

== Synopsis ==
An undercover investigative squad of homicide detectives is formed, and their extra-legal methods include wiretapping, communications monitoring and deep-cover infiltration. Among its members are Cha Geon-woo (Kim Bum), a former ROKN SEAL and KNP SWAT member who pursues his targets doggedly and is secretly on a revenge mission after his girlfriend's death; principled and perceptive team leader Jang Moo-won (Park Sung-woong), who was granted permission to form the squad and will personally face the consequences if it fails; Jang Min-joo (Yoon So-yi), who's skilled in disguise, psychoanalysis and martial arts; and sly Choi Tae-pyung (Lee Won-jong), who gets information from shady back-alley connections.

== Cast ==
- Kim Bum as Cha Geon-woo
- Park Sung-woong as Jang Moo-won
- Yoon So-yi as Jang Min-joo
  - Kim Hye-yoon as young Jang Min-joo (ep. 14)
- Lee Won-jong as Choi Tae-pyung
- Kim Tae-hoon as Min Tae-in
- Im Kang-sung as Yoo Jin-woo
- Im Hyun-sung as Jin Duk-hoo
- Kim Min-jun as Teacher Jeong
- Kang Sung-jin as Nam In-ho
- Im Jong-yoon as Han Sang-joon
- Jung Do-won
- Woo Jung-gook
- Ryu Sung-hyun as Baek Pro
- Park Sung-taek
- Seo Yoo-jung as Eom In-kyung
- Jang Seo-hee as Jung Ji-won
- Kim Ha-rin as Yeon-hwa (Teacher Jung's wife)
- Kim Ji-won as Min Tae-hee
- Jung Jin as Chang-min
- Hong Seung-jin as Sung-mo
- Choi Jeong-woo as Lee Myung-geun, President of arms manufacturing company
- Lee Geung-young as Choi Dae-han/Ghost, NIS Director

== Ratings ==
In this table, the blue numbers represent the lowest ratings and the red numbers represent the highest ratings.

Ep.	Original broadcast date	Average audience share	
Ep.	Original broadcast date	AGB Nielsen	TNmS
Ep.	Original broadcast date	Nationwide	Nationwide
1	June 16, 2015	2.3%	2.3%
2	June 16, 2015	1.9%	2.4%
3	June 22, 2015	1.6%	1.8%
4	June 23, 2015	2.5%	2.3%
5	June 29, 2015	2.0%	1.7%
6	June 30, 2015	2.1%	2.3%
7	July 6, 2015	2.0%	1.9%
8	July 7, 2015	2.1%	2.3%
9	July 13, 2015	2.0%	1.6%
10	July 14, 2015	1.8%	2.3%
11	July 20, 2015	1.9%	1.6%
12	July 21, 2015	1.9%	1.6%
13	July 27, 2015	1.7%	1.9%
14	July 28, 2015	2.4%	2.2%
15	August 3, 2015	1.5%	1.9%
16	August 4, 2015	2.2%	2.4%
Average		2.0%	2.0%

- This drama airs on a cable channel/pay TV which normally has a relatively smaller audience compared to free-to-air TV/public broadcasters (KBS, SBS, MBC and EBS).
