= Lee Jae-ryong =

South Korean actor (born 1964)

- Born: September 24, 1964 (age 62); Damyang County, Jeollanam-do, South Korea
- Education: Chung-Ang University – Theater and Film; Korea University Graduate School – Master's degree in Journalism
- Occupation: Actor
- Years active: 1986–present
- Agent: S.M. Entertainment
- Spouse: Yoo Ho-jeong (m. 1995)

Korean name
- Hangul: 이재룡
- Hanja: 李在龍
- RR: I Jaeryong
- MR: I Chaeryong

Lee Jae-ryong (born September 24, 1964) is a South Korean actor. He is best known for starring in television series, notably the merchant-centered period epic Sangdo (2001), the medical drama General Hospital (1994 and 2008), and Noh Hee-kyung-penned dramas such as Foolish Love (2000) and Goodbye Solo (2006).

== Filmography ==
=== Television series ===
| Year | Title | Role | Network |
|---|---|---|---|
| 1989 | 2nd Republic | Masan police | MBC |
| 1989 | Still 49 | | MBC |
| 1991 | What Is Love | Han Chul-jin | MBC |
| 1991 | Yesterday's Green Grass | | KBS1 |
| 1992 | Thorn Flower | Han Young-bin | KBS2 |
| 1993 | To Live | Lee Woo-jin | SBS |
| 1993 | Women's Room | Hwang Bo-hyun | MBC |
| 1993 | Pilot | Lee Yoon-chul | MBC |
| 1993 | Sisters | Jae-guk | MBC |
| 1993 | I Have To Rise Up | Park Jong-ha | MBC |
| 1994 | General Hospital | Kim Do-hoon | MBC |
| 1994 | Bird, Bird, Blue Bird | Do-young | MBC |
| 1996 | Dangerous Love | Kim Eui-hwan | MBC |
| 1996 | Reasons For Not Getting Divorced | Hong Seo-hwan | MBC |
| 1997 | Because I Really | Cha Dae-ki | KBS2 |
| 1998 | Love and Success | Kim Jang-soo | MBC |
| 1998 | How Am I | Lee Jae-ryong | SBS |
| 1999 | Did We Really Love? | Song Kil-jin | MBC |
| 1999 | Waves | Park Young-joon | SBS |
| 1999 | You Don't Know My Mind | Choi Dae-han | MBC |
| 1999 | Meeting | Choi Yeon-taek | KBS2 |
| 2000 | Foolish Love | Jin Sang-woo | KBS2 |
| 2001 | Orient Theatre | Hwang-chul | KBS2 |
| 2001 | The Merchant | Im Sang-ok | MBC |
| 2002 | To Be with You | Choi Min-sung | KBS1 |
| 2002 | The Maengs' Golden Era | Choi Kyu-sik | MBC |
| 2004 | Immortal Admiral Yi Sun-sin | Ryu Seong-ryong | KBS1 |
| 2006 | Goodbye Solo | Kang Ho-chul | KBS2 |
| 2006 | Snow Flower | Yoo Geon-hee | SBS |
| 2007 | Bad Woman, Good Woman | Song Geon-woo | MBC |
| 2008 | General Hospital 2 | Kim Do-hoon, professor of surgery | MBC |
| 2010 | KBS Drama Special – "Red Candy" | Jae-bak | KBS2 |
| 2011 | Believe in Love | Kim Dong-hoon | KBS2 |
| 2013 | A Bit of Love | Choi Min-soo | KBS2 |
| 2013 | The King's Daughter, Soo Baek-hyang | King Muryeong | MBC |
| 2016 | A Beautiful Mind | Chae Soon-ho | KBS2 |
| 2017 | Man in the Kitchen | Calvin Miller | MBC |
| 2022 | The Driver | Cameo | MBN |

=== Film ===
| Year | Title | Role |
|---|---|---|
| 1992 | Sons and Lovers | |
| 1997 | Hallelujah | Pastor Kim |
| 1998 | First Kiss | Jajangmyeon actor (cameo) |
| 2003 | North Korean Guys | Manager of jet ski rentals (cameo) |
| 2004 | Low Life | Intelligence agent 2 |
| 2006 | Ice Bar | Young-rae's father |

=== Variety show ===
| Year | Title | Notes |
|---|---|---|
| 1994 | Environmental Exploration Find the Green Man | Host |
| 1999 | Saturday Best | Host |
| 2008 | Good Morning | Host |
| 2014 | Eco Village | Panel |
| 2021 | Star Golf Big League | Cast Member |

== Awards and nominations ==
| Year | Award | Category | Nominated work | Result |
|---|---|---|---|---|
| 1994 | MBC Drama Awards | Excellence Award, Actor | General Hospital | Won |
| 2001 | 14th Grimae Awards | Best Actor | Sangdo | Won |
| 2002 | MBC Drama Awards | Top Excellence Award, Actor in a Serial Drama | Sangdo | Won |
| 2006 | KBS Drama Awards | Excellence Award, Actor | Goodbye Solo | Nominated |
| 2009 | 8th Korea National Council on Social Welfare | Commendation from the Ministry of Health, Welfare, and Family Affairs | —N/a | Won |
| 2010 | KBS Drama Awards | Excellence Award, Actor in a One-Act Drama/Special | Red Candy | Nominated |
| 2011 | KBS Drama Awards | Excellence Award, Actor in a Serial Drama | Believe in Love | Nominated |
| 2013 | MBC Drama Awards | Top Excellence Award, Actor in a Serial Drama | The King's Daughter, Soo Baek-hyang | Nominated |
