= Joo Hyun =

South Korean actor (born 1943)

- Born: Joo Il-choon; March 1, 1943 (age 83); Hyesan, Kankyōnan Province, Korea, Empire of Japan
- Other name: Ju Hyeon
- Occupation: Actor
- Years active: 1960–present
- Children: 2

- Joo Hyun
- Hangul: 주일춘
- Hanja: 朱一春
- RR: Ju Ilchun
- MR: Chu Ilch'un

Stage name
- Hangul: 주현
- Hanja: 朱鉉
- RR: Ju Hyeon
- MR: Chu Hyŏn

Joo Hyun (Korean: 주현; born Joo Il-choon, Korean: 주일춘; March 1, 1943) is a South Korean actor, known for A Family (2004), Ballerina (2023) and Running Man(2013).

== Biography ==
Joo graduated from Konkuk University in Seoul, where he majored in political science and diplomacy. He began his acting career after being selected through a special recruiting program by the Korean Broadcasting System (KBS) in 1969, making his debut the following year in Vietnam War Battlefield. In 1990 Joo played his first comedic role, giving a memorable performance in the KBS TV drama Seoul Ttukbaeki.

Joo starred in the 2004 film A Family alongside Soo Ae, portraying a single father who has a troubled relationship with his daughter. His performance found favour with critics, with Darcy Paquet of Koreanfilm.org saying, "in his accomplished handling of small details and the film's quieter moments, Joo succeeds in making the father a real person instead of a stereotype", and in October 2005 won the award for Best Actor at the 50th Asia Pacific Film Festival.

In 2006 Joo starred in the musical comedy film The Fox Family, learning to sing and dance during a month-long period of intensive training. He chose the film because the story was fun and unconventional, and said, "it was fun to challenge myself and I don't have any regrets".

Joo is the father of two children, having both a son and a daughter.

== Filmography ==
=== Film ===
Year	Title	Role
1975	The North Korean Communists Party in Japan	
1976	Cold Hearted Days	
1977	Night Journey	
1980	No Glory	
1991	Han Hee-jak's Love Stories	
1994	Emperor of Sae-al City	
1997	Father vs Son	
1999	Happy End	Bookstore owner
2001	Friend	
2001	Out of Justice	
2002	Saving My Hubby	Baek-sa
2002	2424	Kang Yong-gu
2003	My Wife Is a Gangster 2	Gosachae
2004	Sweet Sixties	Bae Jong-dal
2004	A Family	Ju-seok
2005	All for Love	Mr. Kwak
2006	The Fox Family	Father
2007	Mapado 2: Back to the Island	Park Dal-gu
2007	Miracle on 1st Street	
2007	A Love	

=== Television series ===
Year	Title	Role	Network
1970	Vietnam War Battlefield		
1990	Seoul Ttukbaeki		
1998	Lie	Joo Hyun-chul	
1999	Did We Really Love?	Lee Byung-kuk	
1999	Goodbye My Love	Choi Hyun-su	
2001	Hotelier	President Choi	
2001	The Merchant		
2001	Wuri's Family	Man-su	
2002	Saxophone	Kang Kap-su	
2002	Let's Get Married	Tak Song-baek	
2002	Solitude	Min Sun-saeng	
2003	Yellow Handkerchief	Lee Woon-kyu	
2003	Love Letter	Dr. Jung Myung-woo	
2004	More Beautiful Than a Flower	Kim Do-chil	
2004	War of the Roses	Oh Il-man	
2004	Love Story in Harvard	Lee Yong-goo	
2005	Wonderful Life	Han Bum-soo	
2005	The Secret Lovers	Suh Dal-koo	
2006	My Lovely Fool	Dr. Park Pung-soo	
2007	A Happy Woman	Choi Hyun-doo	
2007	Several Questions That Make Us Happy		
2007	Thirty Thousand Miles in Search of My Son	Chairman Kang	
2008	Kokkiri	Bok-man's father	
2008	Why Did You Come to My House	Han Jin-tae	
2015	Heart to Heart	Go Sang-gyu	
2016	Dear My Friends	Lee Seong-jae	
2016	Dr. Romantic	Shin Myung-ho	
2019	Mother of Mine	Jeong Dae-cheol	
2019	Never Twice	Choi Geo-bok	
2020	Dr. Romantic 2	Shin Myung-ho (cameo, ep. 1)	

=== Television shows ===
Year	Title	Role	Notes	Ref.
2021	God Father	Main Cast	with Lee Soo-jae and Kim Kap-soo	
