= Glass Castle =

2008 South Korean television series

- Promotional poster
- Also known as: City of Glass
- Hangul: 유리의 성
- Hanja: 琉璃의 城
- RR: Yuriui seong
- MR: Yuriŭi sŏng
- Genre: Romance; Family drama
- Written by: Choi Hyun-kyung
- Directed by: Jo Nam-kook
- Starring: Yoon So-yi; Lee Jin-wook; Kim Seung-soo
- Country of origin: South Korea
- Original language: Korean
- No. of episodes: 51

Production
- Producer: Kim Yong-seob
- Running time: Saturdays and Sundays at 20:50

Original release
- Network: Seoul Broadcasting System
- Release: September 6, 2008 – March 1, 2009

Glass Castle (Korean: 유리의 성; RR: Yuriui seong; also known as City of Glass) is a 2008 South Korean television series that aired on SBS from September 6, 2008, to March 1, 2009, on Saturdays and Sundays at 20:50 for 51 episodes. Yoon So-yi stars as an ambitious and tough reporter whose life and career take a turn after she falls for a charming and persistent suitor (played by Lee Jin-wook), and marries him. But her aspirations of becoming a great reporter are put on hold while she struggles with her new life as the daughter-in-law of a rich, influential but controlling chaebol family. On the sidelines is her mentor and friend, a head newscaster (played by Kim Seung-soo) for whom she also develops uncertain feelings.

== Plot ==
Growing up in a poor family, Min-joo (Yoon So-yi) finally lands a job as a news correspondent with JBC Networks after two previous failed attempts. She works hard to gain recognition as a reporter but faces a career setback due to a stroke of bad luck. With strong support from Seok-jin (Kim Seung-soo), she is able to get her career back on track. Although she has feelings for Seok-jin, she is reluctant to date him because he is a single father with one daughter. Meanwhile, Joon-sung (Lee Jin-wook), the scion of a wealthy family, enters her life and proposes marriage to her after a brief courtship. She becomes the envy of her friends when she marries him because her life is like a modern version of the Cinderella fairy tale. Her life as the daughter-in-law of a wealthy family is wonderful at first but she becomes disillusioned with her marriage when her in-laws begin to look down on her and smother her personal life. Against the wishes of her in-laws, she returns to work as a news correspondent and soon learns that the adopted son of her brother-in-law is actually the son of her husband from a previous relationship. Shocked at this revelation, she realizes that she loved Joon-sung for his family wealth and not for who he was. After contemplating on what to do, she decides that getting a divorce is her only option. Joon-sung, however, agrees to part ways in an amicable divorce without telling her that the adopted son of his brother is actually the posthumous child of his second brother...

== Cast ==
=== Main characters ===
- Yoon So-yi as Jung Min-joo, 26 years old

Min-joo is a hard worker. She believes in justice, respect, and that if you work hard at your dreams they will come true. This is exactly how she became a news announcer at JBC. After almost failing the exam/interview twice she finally gets her hand at being a reporter. While her true dream is to become a news anchor, she can't believe her luck when she is given this chance while on assignment. She is praised for a job well done, but she can't help but notice that her role model, Seok-jin, doesn't seem to notice. She doesn't understand why he gives her such a hard time and is secretly infuriated with him because of his rudeness.

In the meantime, she runs into Joon-sung. While he doesn't give her a good impression at first, she slowly warms up to him and is astonished when she finally finds out that he is the son of Yoo Sung Group. Throughout this story she will come face to face with two kinds of love, from Joon-sung and from Seok-jin.

- Lee Jin-wook as Kim Joon-sung, 32 years old

Joon-sung is your typical cool guy, but a little smarter. After seeing how loveless his older brother's marriage is, Joon-sung is determined to fall in love with someone who he can remain passionate with for the rest of his life. Until that time, he continues to work for his father's corporation, Yoo Sung Group. While he works for a corporation during the day, at night he plays at a local jazz club. His real dream is to become a guitarist in a band...

While driving at night he almost hits a young woman who is crossing the street on a red light. This woman is Min-joo. While he normally wouldn't think twice about such an odd encounter, he picks up her diary/calendar and realizes what a spunky woman she is. He is determined to get to know her personally and it is during this time that the two fall in love.

- Kim Seung-soo as Park Seok-jin, 37 years old

Seok-jin is cold to those who have not yet earned their place, which is exactly how he acts toward the fresh, young Min-joo. He's skilled at what he does and knows it, but he attributes it to his passion for the industry and the hard work that got him there. He comes from a humble background and even has a daughter from a previously loving relationship.

As he gets to know Min-joo he slowly realizes he has feelings for her. But he doesn't let this make him treat her any differently from others. He gives her a hard time, but only because he wants her to learn from her mistakes. When he discovers that his feelings are deeper than he thought, he tries to figure out whether or not to hide them because of his past, and whether or not she deserves better.

=== Supporting characters ===
Jung family

- Lee Hye-sook as Han Yang-sook (Min-joo's mother)
- Lee Han-wi as Son Dong-sik (Min-joo's step-father)
- Han Yeo-reum as Kang Hye-young (Min-joo's half-sister)
- Shin Dong-woo as Son Kang-min (Dong-sik and Yang-suk's son)

Kim family

- Park Geun-hyung as Kim Doo-hyung (Joon-sung's father)
- Park Won-sook as Yoon In-kyung (Joon-sung's mother)
- Jang Hyun-sung as Kim Gyu-sung (Joon-sung older brother)
- Yang Jung-a as Oh Yoo-ran (Gyu-sung's wife)
- Yoo Seo-jin as Kim Joon-hee (Joon-sung's older sister)
- ?? as Kim Seung-ha (Gyu-sung and Yoo-ran's 2-year-old son)
- ?? as Kim Moo-sung (Joon-sung's deceased brother)

Park family

- Jung Jae-soon as Yoon In-suk (Joon-sung's aunt)
- Lee Joo-yeon as Park Seul-ki (Seok-jin's 8-year-old daughter)

Other people

- Jung Jin-moo as Jang Tae-soo (Hye-young's boyfriend)
- Kim Sun-hwa as Chun Ok-ja (Tae-soo's mother)
- Song Ji-eun as Song Ji-yeon (Seung-ha's biological mother)
- Yoon A-jung as Lee Joo-hee
- Jung Da-young as Seo Ye-kyung
- Seo Jin-wook as Min Ji-hwan
- Yoo Tae-woong as prosecutor Lee Hyung-suk
- Song Seo-yeon as Song Ji-yeon
- Kang Chan-yang as Kang Mi-ae
- Lee Sol-gu as hostage taker

== Awards ==
2008 SBS Drama Awards

- Best Supporting Actor in a Serial Drama: Lee Han-wi
- New Star Award: Yoon So-yi
