= Midnight Garage =

- Theatrical poster
- Directed by: Zhou Yaowu
- Written by: Zhou Yaowu
- Starring: Alex Fong; Yoon So-yi; Gordon Lam
- Release date: April 3, 2015
- Country: China
- Language: Mandarin

Midnight Garage (simplified Chinese: 三更车库; traditional Chinese: 三更車庫; pinyin: Sāngēng Chēkù) is a 2015 Chinese horror film directed and written by Zhou Yaowu and starring Alex Fong, Yoon So-yi and Gordon Lam.

== Plot ==
A family of three moves to a housing complex currently under construction. The father parks their car on an empty space with an out-of-order sign in a nearby underground parking lot. During their visit to the construction site, a loose metal falls and crushes them. The film cuts to a group of friends who is about to watch a new film in a cinema. Interspersed with it is Lisa, an office worker who works at the office where the previous parking lot is located, going to work with her lover. The parking lot is managed by two security guards: the older, cowardly, and perverted Baozi and the younger, recently inducted, and superstitious Luokun. The two are warned not to remove the out-of-order sign because of the presence of a "ghost", though only Luokun really takes this seriously.

Lisa frequently has problems with starting her car in the parking lot and feels haunted by the ghosts of a young girl dressed in red and a white-clothed figure. During one such problem, Baozi checks through the lot further and comes into a dilapidated room. Upon encountering a pale woman and the girl, he suffers a heart attack and dies. His position is replaced by Shenyang, an even younger and naive individual. Meanwhile, Lisa and her lover encounter the woman and the girl during one night with Lisa's lover leaving her to her fate. She is saved by Luokun, who fends off with his spiritual experience. Lisa then gets a call informing her that her lover is killed in a car accident.

Enough with her experiences, Lisa decides to transfer to the company's branch in Hong Kong. She gives her car key to the guards upon being informed that parking near the sidewalk is forbidden, but to her horror finds out that her car is parked back at the underground parking lot. Escorted by Luokun, she is able to drive away but her car stops just as she is about to get outside. While waiting in the security room, she discovers wigs and a white dress, realizing that Luokun is pretending to be the ghost. He goes up and chains her to a bed, revealing their previous relationship at a hotel which Lisa has long since forgotten, saying that he will take revenge at her for abandoning and humiliating him. After Luokun fends off the woman and girl ghosts (revealed to be the mother and daughter killed in the prologue) and delivering them to their relatives, he has a cat-and-mouse chase with Lisa and manages to tie her back, but Shenyang arrives and has a deadly fight with Luokun in which he dies, giving Lisa time to escape. Lisa and Luokun continue their chase above until Luokun abruptly gets hit by a car.

It is revealed that most of the film's plot about Lisa and the security guards is a film within a film watched by the three friends introduced in the film's opening. Deciding that the film is mediocre, the three take their leave from the underground parking lot (in exactly the same place notified with the out-of-order sign) and go home, but are involved in a horrific car accident in which one of them has his head sliced off, while the other has his feet blown up and eventually crushed by an exploding manhole cover.

== Cast ==
- Alex Fong
- Yoon So-yi
- Gordon Lam
- Tse Kwan-ho
- Bai Ru
- Cho Sung-bin
- Jiang Zhongwei
