= Did We Really Love? =

1999 South Korean drama series

- DVD cover
- Also known as: True to Love; Have We Really Loved?
- Hangul: 우리가 정말 사랑했을까
- RR: Uriga jeongmal saranghaesseulkka
- MR: Uriga chŏngmal saranghaessŭlkka
- Written by: Noh Hee-kyung
- Directed by: Park Jong
- Country of origin: South Korea
- Original language: Korean
- No. of episodes: 44

Original release
- Network: Munhwa Broadcasting Corporation
- Release: January 27 – June 24, 1999

Did We Really Love? (Korean: 우리가 정말 사랑했을까; RR: Uriga jeongmal saranghaesseulkka) is a South Korean drama series broadcast by MBC in 1999. Starring Bae Yong-joon, the series portrays the struggles between love, happiness, and the pursuit of material success.

== Plot ==
Jae-ho and his sister Jae-young were abandoned by their mother to escape poverty. Because of this, Jae-ho doesn't understand what love is. And so, he has a dream of becoming rich, thinking that there is no such thing as love, only money. He works hard his whole life while supporting himself and his sister through college. He works at a seafood wholesale market selling crabs to vendors. He lives with his aunt who has taken him and his sister in after their mother abandoned them.

With his big dreams and ambitions, he pretends to be rich while in school, in order to gain the attention of Hyun-soo, who is from a very rich family. Thus, he tries to get her to like him so he can marry into her family and become rich. But during this process, he falls in love with his Psychology teacher, Shin-young. He battles with his feelings and his ambitions, and ultimately picks love over money. Even though they go through hardships, he realizes that he can't survive without both, and so he gives up on Shin-young for money and wishes her happiness. He only does this because everything seems to go wrong while he is with Shin-young. He loses his job, all his money, and his aunt's house gets seized. He thinks that if he has money, none of this would have ever happened. Through all the stress, he finds out that he has brain cancer and expresses his desire to die.

== Cast ==
- Bae Yong-joon as Kang Jae-ho
- Kim Hye-soo as Lee Shin-young
- Yoon Son-ha as Cho Hyun-soo
- Lee Jae-ryong as Song Kil-jin
- Kim Young-ae as Jung Jin-sook (Jae-ho's aunt)
- Joo Hyun as Lee Byung-kuk (Shin-young's father)
- Youn Yuh-jung as Choi Hae-ja (Shin-young's mother)
- Park Sang-min as Park Suk-koo (Jae-ho's best friend)
- Lee Na-young as Kang Jae-young (Jae-ho's younger sister)
  - Lee Se-young as young Jae-young
- Kim Young-mi as Ko Mi-sun (Jae-young's neighbor)
- Na Moon-hee as Shin Shin-ja (Mi-sun's mother)
- Lee Kye-in as Seo Dal-kwon (Jin-sook's neighbor)
- Yang Hee-kyung as Jung In-sook (Dal-kwon's wife/Hee-jin's stepmother)
- Kim Ga-yeon as Kyoung-hee (waitress in Jin-sook's bar)
- Yoon Yong-hyun as Min-chul (Jae-ho's college friend)
- Kim Hae-sook as Jae-ho's mother
- Kim Hye-ri as Jung Yong (Kil-jin's friend/Jae-ho's doctor)
- Shim Yang-hong as Hyun-soo's father
- Song Il-kook
