= A Family (2004 film) =

- Theatrical poster
- Directed by: Lee Jung-chul
- Written by: Lee Jung-chul
- Produced by: Hwang Woo-hyun; Hwang Jae-woo; Kim Seung-bum; Ryu Soo-cheol
- Starring: Soo Ae; Joo Hyun
- Cinematography: Choi Sang-muk
- Edited by: Nam Na-yeong
- Music by: Lee Dong-jun
- Distributed by: Tube Entertainment
- Release date: September 3, 2004
- Running time: 95 minutes
- Country: South Korea
- Language: Korean

A Family (Korean: 가족; RR: Gajok) is a 2004 South Korean drama film starring Soo Ae and Joo Hyun, and written and directed by Lee Jung-chul.

== Plot ==
Jeong-eun, a former pickpocket with four prior convictions, is released from prison after serving a three-year sentence. She reunites with her younger brother, Jeong-hwan, and father, Ju-seok, the latter with whom she has a troubled relationship. Ju-seok, an ex-cop-turned-fishmonger, hides his love and concern for his daughter beneath a gruff exterior. Though Jeong-eun is tough and rebellious, she is fiercely protective of her brother and father, and is genuinely determined to put her life in order this time. While under probation, she works as an assistant at a beauty salon, hoping to someday open her own salon with the money she has saved. But Chang-won, who was once her partner in crime and now leads his own gang, not only refuses to give Jeong-eun her cut of their last job, but he and his gangsters begin harassing her family, saying she's the one who owes him money.

== Cast ==
- Soo Ae as Jeong-eun
- Joo Hyun as Ju-seok
- Park Ji-bin as Jeong-hwan
- Park Hee-soon as Chang-won
- Uhm Tae-woong as Dong-su
- Jung Wook as Byeong-cheon
- Chu Gwi-jeong as beauty salon owner
- Jeon Guk-hwan as Man-sik
- Kim Se-dong as probation officer

== Awards and nominations ==
Year	Award	Category	Recipient	Result
2004	Blue Dragon Film Awards	Best New Actress	Soo Ae	Won
2004	Blue Dragon Film Awards	Best New Director	Lee Jung-chul	Nominated
2004	Korean Film Awards	Best New Actor	Park Hee-soon	Nominated
2004	Korean Film Awards	Best New Actress	Soo Ae	Won
2004	Director's Cut Awards	Best New Actress	Soo Ae	Won
2004	Cine 21 Awards	Best New Actress	Soo Ae	Won
2005	Max Movie Awards	Best Actress	Soo Ae	Won
2005	Baeksang Arts Awards	Best New Actress	Soo Ae	Won
2005	Grand Bell Awards	Best New Actress	Soo Ae	Nominated
2005	Asia Pacific Film Festival	Best Actor	Joo Hyun	Won
