= Epitaph (2007 film) =

- Film poster
- Hangul: 기담
- Hanja: 奇談
- RR: Gidam
- MR: Kidam
- Directed by: Jung Sik; Jung Bum-shik
- Written by: Jung Sik; Jung Bum-shik
- Produced by: Jang So-jeong
- Starring: Jin Goo; Kim Tae-woo; Kim Bo-kyung; Ko Joo-yeon
- Cinematography: Yoon Nam-joo
- Edited by: Kim Sang-bum; Kim Jae-bum
- Music by: Park Yeong-ran
- Release date: August 1, 2007
- Running time: 98 minutes
- Country: South Korea
- Languages: Korean; Japanese
- Budget: US$2.8 million
- Box office: US$4,584,035

Epitaph (Korean: 기담; RR: Gidam) is a 2007 South Korean film directed by brothers Jung Sik and Jung Bum-shik. It is a horror film set primarily in 1942, while Korea was under the colonial rule of Japan. It is framed by scenes set in 1979.

== Plot ==
Dr. Park Jung-nam finds a photo album dating back to his days as an intern at the Ansaeng Hospital. This triggers memories of his life. In 1942, as a young medical intern, Jung-nam's arranged marriage ended when his fiancée, whom he had never met, committed suicide. Later he was assigned to monitor the morgue late at night. There he fell in love with a corpse, which is later revealed as the body of his deceased fiancée. Soon other mysterious events take place in the hospital, involving a young girl haunted by ghosts and a serial killer targeting Japanese soldiers.

== Cast ==
- Kim Bo-kyung as Kim In-yeong
- Jin Goo as Park Jeong-nam
- Lee Dong-kyu as Lee Su-In
- Kim Tae-woo as Kim Dong-won
- Ko Joo-yeon as Asako
- Park Ji-a as mother
- David McInnis as father
- Kim Ju-hyeon as Aoi
- Kim Eung-soo as Akiyama
- Choi Jae-hwan as Jae-hwan
- Jeon Moo-song as Professor Park Jung-nam
- Choi Dae-woong as Professor Jung
- Jung Ji-ahn as Nurse Choi
- Ye Soo-jung as Director of Ansang Hospital
- Kong Ho-suk as Japanese General
- Son Young-soon as old woman
- Kim Ja-young as head nurse
- Uhm Tae-goo as Japanese soldier 1
- Son In-yong as Japanese soldier 2

== Critical reception ==
The cinematography, directing and acting by horror film mainstays Kim Eung-soo and Ye Soo-jeong have earned the film praise as "visually as well as intellectually impressive, with some gorgeous cinematography and wonderfully composed shots," and "a significant contribution to rehabilitating K-horror's international reputation."

== Awards and nominations ==
2007 Blue Dragon Film Awards

- Best Cinematography: Yoon Nam-joo
- Best Art Direction: Kim Yu-jeong, Lee Min-bok
- Nomination - Best New Director: Jung Sik, Jung Bum-shik
- Nomination - Best Lighting: Kim Ji-hoon
- Nomination - Technical Award: Kim Sang-bum, Kim Jae-bum (Editing)

2007 Korean Association of Film Critics Awards

- Best New Director: Jung Sik, Jung Bum-shik

2007 Korean Film Awards

- Nomination - Best Art Direction: Kim Yu-jeong, Lee Min-bok
- Nomination - Best Sound: Jang Gwang-su, Seo Yeong-jun
- Nomination - Best New Actress: Ko Joo-yeon

2007 Director's Cut Awards

- Best New Director: Jung Sik, Jung Bum-shik

2008 Asian Film Awards

- Nomination - Best Art Direction: Kim Yu-jeong, Lee Min-bok

2008 Baeksang Arts Awards

- Nomination - Best New Director: Jung Sik, Jung Bum-shik

2008 Grand Bell Awards

- Nomination - Best Music: Park Yeong-ran
- Nomination - Best Visual Effects: Kim Gwang-su

2008 Golden Cinematography Awards

- Best New Actor: Jin Goo
