= Hearts of Nineteen =

- Also known as: Pure in Heart
- Hangul: 열아홉 순정
- Hanja: 열아홉 純情
- RR: Yeorahop sunjeong
- MR: Yŏrahop sunjŏng
- Genre: Drama; Romantic comedy
- Starring: Koo Hye-sun; Seo Ji-seok; Lee Min-woo; Lee Yoon-ji; Chu So-young
- Opening theme: "Sarang Ga" (Love Story) by Ku Hye-sun
- Country of origin: South Korea
- No. of episodes: 167

Production
- Camera setup: Multi-camera
- Running time: 35 minutes

Original release
- Network: KBS1
- Release: May 22, 2006 – January 12, 2007

Hearts of Nineteen (Korean: 열아홉 순정; RR: Yeorahop sunjeong; lit. Pure Nineteen) is a 167-episode South Korean television drama/romantic comedy broadcast by KBS1 from mid 2006 to early 2007. The drama won many awards at 2006 KBS Drama Awards and was a commercial success reaching a peak rating of 43.2% on its January 6 episode and an average viewership of 29.14%.

== Plot ==
Yang Gook-hwa (양국화) is a nineteen-year-old country girl who leaves Yanbian and travels to Seoul because she is marrying Hong Soon-goo (홍순구), the third son in an average but respectable family. When she arrives in Seoul, however, she finds out that her fiancé has just died in a terrible car accident. Instead of returning to Yanbian, she decides to stay and create a new life in Korea while sending money back to her aunt and uncle. While she lives in Korea, she is taken in as a family member by Soon-goo's family. Hong Woo-kyung (홍우경), the son of Soon-goo's oldest brother Moon-goo (문구), especially cares for her like his own sister. Woo-kyung works in the marketing department of UT, a huge telecommunications company. His former classmate Park Yoon-hoo (박윤후), the son of UT's CEO, also works in the marketing department, in a higher position. Yoon-hoo's spoiled younger sister Yoon-jeong (윤정) attends college. The oldest child, Yoon-ji (윤지), is estranged from the family due to her marriage to a poor car salesman.

=== Yoon-hoo and Gook-hwa story ===
Several stories go on throughout the show, and the main story is the one focusing on the development of Gook-hwa and Yoon-hoo's relationship.

At the beginning, Gook-hwa and Yoon-hoo hate each other - Yoon-hoo despises her love for money and for behaving like a country bumpkin, while Gook-hwa detests Yoon-hoo's hot-tempered, icy exterior. He gives her the nickname "farm girl" because he finds her behavior crass. However, when Gook-hwa gets a job as Yoon-hoo's secretary, partly because of her ability to speak fluent Mandarin, Yoon-hoo gradually falls in love with her, as she is able to make him laugh and feel "alive" through her naivete and innocence.

Shin-hyung (신형), Yoon-hoo's childhood friend whom Yoon-hoo's parents want him to marry, notices the change in Yoon-hoo's attitude toward Gook-hwa, and is uncomfortable when Yoon-hoo appears to be getting closer to Gook-hwa, despite their upcoming wedding date. Her insecurity also stems from Yoon-hoo's apparent lack of commitment to their marriage.

Yoon-hoo tells Gook-hwa how he feels about her. She initially thinks he is drunk and rejects his feelings. Yoon-hoo tells his parents and Shin-hyung that he does not want to go ahead with the wedding. His father sends him to the company's Singapore office along with Shin-hyung, who also works in the same company, as a way to make Yoon-hoo forget Gook-hwa and get him to work on his relationship with Shin-hyung.

Gook-hwa learns that Yoon-hoo is going to Singapore, and realizes that she does have feelings for Yoon-hoo. Yoon-hoo confronts Gook-hwa while he is drunk, and demands to know whether she wants him to stay. She denies any feelings for Yoon-hoo. When Yoon-hoo is at the airport waiting to board his flight, Gook-hwa constantly thinks if she should chase after him and tell him the truth. She finally makes up her mind and runs to the airport, proving her true feelings. Yoon-hoo calls her but she does not answer the phone. She eventually fails to make it to the airport before his flight, as she thinks she is crazy for running the airport.

She decides to call Yoon-hoo, only to find out that he decided not to go to Singapore, and has chosen to leave his family, even giving up his credit cards and car. In episode 89, Yoon-hoo yells at Gook-hwa, saying that "I left my house to show my true feelings about you. Can't you be more honest and give me some courage? Now, you are the only one left for me!"

Despite the objections from the world, Yoon-hoo keeps on dating with Gook-hwa. However, Shin-hyung is plotting revenge on Gook-hwa, in order to get Yoon-hoo back. Under pressure from Yoon-hoo's father, Yoon-hoo is rejected by many corporations. Gook-hwa learns that Yoon-hoo is having a hard time and decides to leave him.

Meanwhile, Shin-hyung realizes that Gook-hwa really loves Yoon-hoo through the sacrifices that Gukhwa has made for Yoon-hoo's sake.

Yoon-hoo takes Gook-hwa, who worked as a Chinese translator for him, on a business trip to Jeju Island where an important exhibition is taking place. Yoon-hoo's father, Chairman Park finds Gook-hwa and Yoon-hoo there, and soon, Yoon-hoo has returned to UT as a planning manager in the marketing department, with Gook-hwa as his secretary. Yoon-hoo also decides to help Gook-hwa become more sophisticated and sends her to an academy to help her prepare for her college entrance examination.

However, Soo-jeong (수정), Yoon-hoo's ex-girlfriend, returns to Korea as a divorcee with her son from her previous marriage. Soo-jeong asks Yoon-hoo's mother what is she going to do if her son is Yoon-hoo's child. Yoon-hoo is shocked, and Gook-hwa realizes Soo-jeong's identity. Later on, when Soo-jeong's lie is exposed, and Yoon-hoo proposes to Gook-hwa.

Gook-hwa accepts Yoon-hoo's proposal, but persuades Yoon-hoo to return home, feeling that they have behaved rashly. Yoon-hoo agrees to her request, but Yoon-hoo's mother still opposes the marriage. On the other hand, Chairman Park decides to trust Yoon-hoo's decision, while Yoon-ji and Gwang Man support his decision as well, as Gook-hwa has gained the acceptance of Chairman Park, Yoon-ji and Gwang-man with her modesty and kind-heartedness.

A year later, Gook-hwa is pregnant, and has passed the college entrance examination. The show concludes with a scene of Yoon-hoo and Gook-hwa on a cruise ship on the Han River, celebrating her passing of the college entrance examination.

=== Woo-kyung and Yoon-jeong story ===
At first, Woo-kyung and Yoon-jeong meet at the funeral of Gook-hwa's fiancé. This does not start any relationship. Later, Yoon-jeong (being a bad driver) hits Woo-kyung's car and claims that Woo-kyung was at fault. Woo-kyung continues to try to avoid her, but Yoon-jeong chases him. Even though Woo-kyung tells her he is not interested, but she still chases him. Eventually Yoon-jeong says that she won't chase him anymore and she will stop wasting her time. Woo-kyung then starts to miss her presence all around, so he pursues her. In episode 95, Woo-kyung begs Yoon-jeong not to date Jin Soo and she came back to him. This eventually starts their relationship. When Yoon-jeong's mother finds out, she refuses saying that Woo-kyung has a poor background and family. However, Chairman Park, who is Yoon-jeong's father allows the marriage, claiming that Woo-kyung is too much for her. As the story goes, Yoon-jeong's mother doesn't let Yoon-jeong go out after she was greatly embarrassed in the public place by her and Woo-kyung. Woo-kyung goes to Yoon-jeong's house, firmly saying that he doesn't want Yoon-jeong to go to anymore dating.

Yoon-jeong then asks her older sister Yoon-ji what she did so that she could get their mother to let the older sister to marry. The Older sister then told Yoon-jeong that she faked her own pregnancy. Yoon-jeong then fakes her own pregnancy to her mother and her mother believes it. When she fakes it, her mother says that Woo-kyung and Yoon-jeong must be married quickly since sex before marriage is very bad in Korea. Woo-kyung and Yoon-jeong set a date and when her mother tells Woo-kyung that, he gets extremely angry. So does her mother. Yoon-jeong begs Woo-kyung and her mother for her dishonesty.

When Woo-kyung and Yoon-jeong get married, they go on a honeymoon/business trip because exhibition and honeymoon happened to be at the same time. Later in the story, you find out that Yoon-jeong actually got pregnant from Woo-kyung after their honeymoon. A recurring joke at this time is Yoon-jeong asking for something from Woo-kyung, he is going out to get it, and then she is telling him that she wants something else instead. A little later in the story, you also find out that Yoon-jeong is actually going to have twins. In the final episode, you see the twins born after the time lapse.

Later in the part, when Mr. Hong, the grandfather collapses, Woo-kyung decided to inherit his grandfather's tailor shop. Also, inheriting his grandfather's tailor shop was what he truly wanted to do. Woo-kyung's mother opposes his plan, reminding the fact from 10 years ago. However, Woo-kyung pursues his plan, with his new business ideas. A year later, Woo-kyung's tailor shop became famous nationwide, earned his fame as a great tailor. Woo-kyung earned a lot of money, however, maintains his original personality. Yoon-jeong became a mother of a boy and girl twin, still maintaining her bright characteristics.

== Cast ==
- Koo Hye-sun as Yang Gook-hwa: Bold, brave-hearted, clever girl. Eventually attracts Yoon-hoo, then his family members with her tender heartedness and modesty. Marries Yoon-hoo on the episode 160. Towards the end, she becomes pregnant and passes the university entrance examination.
- Seo Ji-seok as Park Yoon-hoo: Smart and attractive, however, cold and strict. His cold personality has earned him the nickname "Ice Man" among his co-workers. His personality takes a change as he develops his relationship with Gook-hwa and eventually, falling in love with her.
- Lee Min-woo as Hong Woo-kyung: Smart and principled person. He inherited his grandfather's tailor shop, and made it famous throughout Korea. He eventually falls in love with Yoon-jeong and marries her.
- Lee Yoon-ji as Park Yoon-jeong; Yoon-hoo's younger sister: Flippant, trouble-maker, selfish, thoughtless. Obsessed with jewels and shopping. However, she is tenderhearted and refuses to be married just for convenience. Became brighter and maturer after marrying Woo-kyung.
- Chu So-young as Kang Shin-hyung: Yoon-hoo and Woo-kyung's friend. Her family is a family friend of Yoon-hoo's. Her parents are deceased, well-known doctors. Her brother is a surgeon. Shin-hyung wants Yoon-hoo for herself and derides him for pining away for his former girlfriend and later for his involvement with Gook-hwa.
- Jo Jeong-rin as Hong Woo-sook; Woo-kyung's younger sister: Develops her relationship with Shin-hyung's brother. Seems to have lower self-esteem because of her stocky build.
- Kang Nam-gil as Hong Moon-goo; Woo-kyung and Woo-sook's father: Tenderhearted and understanding person.
- Kim Mi-kyung as Kim Ok-geum; Woo-kyung and Woo-sook's mother: Tenderhearted and understanding, however, once she explodes, she is unstoppable. She is more strict than her husband in dealing with her children and Gook-hwa, and later becomes furious when her old rival Choi Hye-sook becomes involved with the family.
- Shin Goo as Hong Young-gam; Woo-kyung and Woo-sook's grandfather, patriarch of the Hong family: Young-minded person, tenderhearted with romantic characteristic. Encourages and advises Woo-kyung, Yoon-jeong, Yoon-hoo, and Gook-hwa at the hard times, based on his experience and feelings during his 20 years as a widower. Good at making people feel impressed by his speeches or actions.
- Lee Hye-sook as Choi Hye-sook; Woo-kyung and Woo-sook's grandmother: She is Ok-geum's high school friend. She is good at ticking off Ok Geum's temper and making people surprised. She was formerly rich but seems to have lost the wealth. She gets involved with old Young-gam, seeing him as the father she never had, and eventually their relationship turns into romantic love. She marries old Young-gam, much to Ok-geum's chagrin, but she is eventually accepted.
- Kang Seok-woo as Hong Poong-goo; Woo-kyung and Woo-sook's uncle: Singer. He's also an old friend of Hye-sook and at one point rivalizes with his own father over her. Develops his relationship with Pal Ja.
- Jo Mi-ryung as Na Pal-ja: obsessed with Poong-goo. Own the flower shop.
- Lee Han-wi as Ko Dal-soo: Mr. Hong's assistant. Always eager to help.
- Yoon Yoo-sun as Park Yoon-ji; Yoon-hoo's elder sister: The eldest of the siblings, estranged from the family due to marriage with Gwang Man. At first, opposes Gwang-man's plan to become a cook, however, supports him later.
- Ahn Jeong-hoon as Ko Gwang-man; Yoon-ji's husband: Turned himself from a poor car salesman as a great cook, inherited Myeong-hye's cooking academy. Discovered his talents and interests in cooking.
- Youn Yuh-jung as Yoon Myeong-hye; Yoon-hoo's mother: Hypocritical person. She has a cooking show on TV, but has a maid to cook for her family at home. Frequently opposes the marriage of her children. However, her personality eventually changed after meeting Woo-kyung and Gook-hwa.
- Han Jin-hee as Chairman Park Dong-gook; Yoon-hoo's father: Strict and principled person. Doesn't like Myeong-hye's hypocritical characteristic, but is not happy with his children's choices of mates either.
- Ko Eun-mi as Soo-jeong; Yoon-hoo's ex-girlfriend: Puts Yoon-hoo and Gook-hwa's relationship at peril.

== Awards and nominations ==
Won

- 2006 KBS Drama Awards: Best New Actress (Koo Hye-sun)
- 2006 KBS Drama Awards: Best New Actress (Lee Yoon-ji)
- 2006 KBS Drama Awards: Best New Actor (Seo Ji-seok)
- 2006 KBS Drama Awards: Best Supporting Actor (Lee Han-wi)
- 2006 KBS Drama Awards: Top Excellence Award, Actor (Shin Goo)

Nominated

- 2006 KBS Drama Awards: Best Supporting Actor (Kang Nam-gil)
- 2006 KBS Drama Awards: Excellence Award, Actor (Lee Min-woo)
- 2007 Baeksang Arts Awards: Best New TV Actress (Koo Hye-sun)
