= Ko Joo-yeon =

South Korean actress (born 1994)

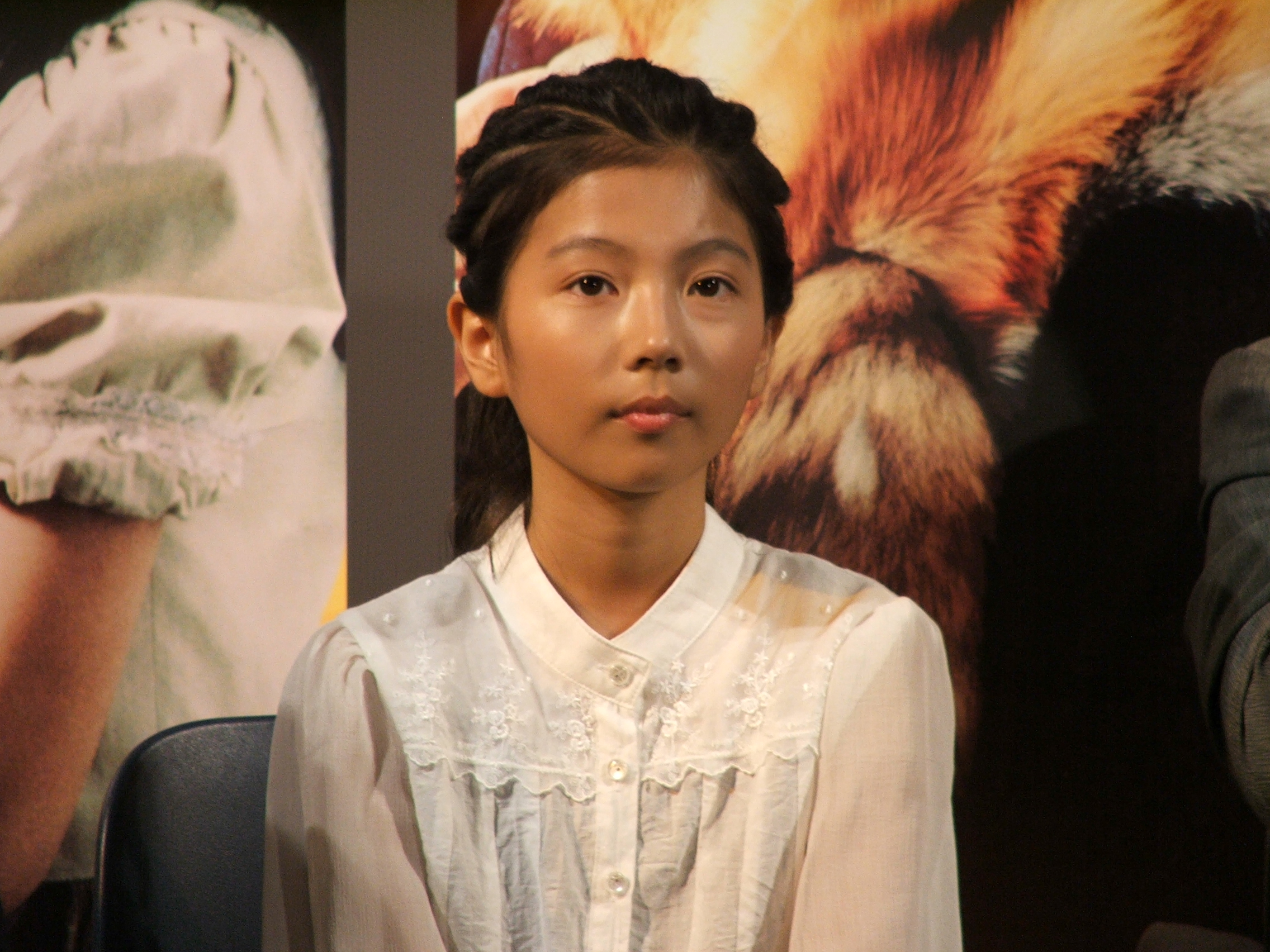
- Ko in 2004
- Born: February 22, 1994 (age 32); South Korea
- Education: Konkuk University
- Occupation: Actress
- Years active: 2001–present

Korean name
- Hangul: 고주연
- Hanja: 高珠姸
- RR: Go Juyeon
- MR: Ko Chuyŏn

Ko Joo-yeon (Korean: 고주연; born February 22, 1994) is a South Korean actress who has gained attention in the Korean film industry for her roles in Blue Swallow (2005) and The Fox Family (2006). In 2007 she appeared in the horror film Epitaph as Asako, a young girl suffering from overbearing nightmares and aphasia, becoming so immersed in the role that she had to deal with sudden nosebleeds while on set. Kyu Hyun Kim of Koreanfilm.org highlighted her performance in the film, saying, "[The cast's] acting thunder is stolen by the ridiculously pretty Ko Joo-yeon, another Korean child actress who we dearly hope continues her film career."

== Filmography ==
=== Film ===
Year	Title	Role
2001	My Wife Is a Gangster	young Yu-jin
2003	Crazy Assassins	Dal-rae
2005	Hello, Brother	
2005	Blue Swallow	young Park Kyung-won
2006	The Fox Family	youngest daughter
2007	Epitaph	Asako
2010	Wedding Dress	Jin-ah's friend
2010	Vegetarian	young Ji-hye
2010	The Recipe	girl
2011	Officer of the Year	Soo-yeon
2011	My Way	teenage Eun-soo

=== Television series ===
Year	Title	Role	Network
2001	Hong Guk-yeong		MBC
2006	Seoul 1945	young Kim Hae-kyung	KBS2
2006	The Snow Queen	young Kim Bo-ra	KBS2
2007	Lucifer	young Seo Hae-in	KBS2
2010	Master of Study	Lee Ye-ji	KBS2
2011	I Trusted Him	Lee Eun-kyung	MBC
2012	Jeon Woo-chi	Deposed queen Lady Kim	KBS2
2013	Prime Minister & I	Roo-ri	KBS2

=== Music video appearance ===
Year	Song title	Artist
2011	"0330"	U-KISS

== Awards and nominations ==
Year	Award	Category	Nominated work	Result
2006	KBS Drama Awards	Best Young Actress	Seoul 1945	Nominated
2007	6th Korean Film Awards	Best New Actress	Epitaph	Nominated
