= Kang Nam-gil =

South Korean actor (born 1958)

- Born: August 27, 1958 (age 68); Seoul, South Korea
- Occupations: Actor; writer
- Years active: 1966–present
- Agent: Live Code Entertainment

Korean name
- Hangul: 강남길
- RR: Gang Namgil
- MR: Kang Namgil

Kang Nam-gil (born August 27, 1958) is a South Korean actor. Kang made his acting debut as a 9-year-old child actor in 1966. He later transitioned to adult roles in 1981 with Let Us Love written by Kim Soo-hyun (and dropped out of Hanyang University's English Language and Literature department). Kang drew popularity when he starred in the family drama Under the Same Roof in 1986, but became best known for playing "Dal-soo" in the single-episode MBC Best Theater, which used his character to satirize the social issues of the day. The Trial of Dal-soo reached 25.7% viewership ratings, the highest in the anthology series' history. In 2000, Kang and his wife divorced on charges of adultery on her part, and his subsequent hospitalization from a heart attack led him to take a hiatus from his acting career and move with his son and daughter to England. He returned to Korea four years later, and made his comeback with People of the Water Flower Village. Kang is also an author of computer books for beginners, and in 2004 he published Oh! My God, a memoir about his life as a stay-at-home dad in Birmingham. In 2008, he played one of the leading roles in the spirit possession dramedy Who Are You?.

== Filmography ==
=== Television series ===
Year	Title	Role	Network
1966	New Lady in Palpan-dong		MBC
1972	Children from the Colonel's House		TBC
1975	Reed	Jin-pal	MBC
1976	Adventures of Chul	Kkeo-beong	MBC
1978	X Search Party		MBC
1981	Let Us Love	Hyung-gi	MBC
1982	Long Live Ttok-soon		KBS1
1982	Annals of Rejection "Lee Yong-ik"		MBC
1982	Yesterday and Tomorrow		MBC
1983	Eldest Daughter		KBS1
1985	500 Years of Joseon: The Wind Orchid	Sim Ui-gyeom	MBC
1985	MBC Bestseller Theater "Winter Row"		MBC
1986	MBC Bestseller Theater "Paper Umbrella"		MBC
1986	Under the Same Roof	Yoon Bong-soo	MBC
1986	Portrait of the Days of Youth		MBC
1987	MBC Bestseller Theater "The Night Before"		MBC
1988	Human Market		MBC
1988	Whoa Hey Whoa Hey	Hong Gil-dong	KBS2
1989	A Star Is Born		MBC
1990	Detectives at the 25th Hour	Youngest detective	KBS2
1990	Love Opened in Every Room	Hong-beom	MBC
1990	Geomsaengi’s Month		KBS2
1991	Maekrang Era	Teacher Ji-hak	KBS1
1991	MBC Best Theater "A Midsummer Night's Dream"	Deputy Kim	MBC
1991	MBC Best Theater "Nongae"		MBC
1992	Haengchon Apartment	Chan-soo	MBC
1992	MBC Best Theater "Life of a Valet"	Heo Gong-soo	MBC
1993	Ya-deung		MBC
1993	MBC Best Theater "For the Apartment"		MBC
1993	Drama Game "Mom's New Semester"		KBS2
1993	Han River Cuckoo		SBS
1993	Letters from Heaven	Maternal uncle	MBC
1993	MBC Best Theater "Man in Dark Gray Pants"	Dal-chae	MBC
1993	Drama Game "Where Did You Go and Now Are You Back?"		KBS2
1993	New The Art of War	Park Dong-tak	KBS2
1994	Man and Woman	Woo Dong-beom	MBC
1994	Stranger in Paradise	Seok-beom's uncle	MBC
1994	Drama Game "With a Daughter, Without a Daughter"		KBS2
1994	MBC Best Theater "The Last War"		MBC
1994	Always a Blue Heart	Homeroom teacher	EBS
1994	General Hospital	Nam Poong-cheon	MBC
1994	Love Is in Your Embrace	Jo Choong-bok	MBC
1995	Asphalt Man	Bae Jong-ok's older brother	SBS
1995	MBC Best Theater "The Trial of Dal-soo"	Kang Dal-soo	MBC
1995	MBC Best Theater "Seoul Blues"	Newsagent	MBC
1995	Hotel	Chef	MBC
1995	Apartment	Mr. Park	MBC
1995	Love Formula		MBC
1995	MBC Best Theater "Dal-soo's Habitat"	Kang Dal-soo	MBC
1996	The Sweet Life	Choi Sang-min	MBC
1996	MBC Best Theater "Dal-soo's Son Goes to School"	Kang Dal-soo	MBC
1996	MBC Best Theater "Dal-soo's Cha Cha Cha"	Kang Dal-soo	MBC
1996	Gan-yi-yeok	Hong Sung-dal	MBC
1996	Wonji-dong Blues	Jang-sik	MBC
1996	Drama Game "A Very Special Gift"		KBS2
1997	Star in My Heart	Han Jae-bong	MBC
1997	MBC Best Theater "Our Shriveled Young-woong"	Han Young-woong	MBC
1997	MBC Best Theater "A Father Who Does Everything; He Can for His Daughter"	Shin-joong	MBC
1997	Miss & Mister		SBS
1997	Hero's Uprising	Department head Lee	MBC
1997	MBC Best Theater "Dal-soo, Outrage over Filial Piety Law"	Kang Dal-soo	MBC
1997	MBC Best Theater "Dal-soo's Solo Arirang"	Kang Dal-soo	MBC
1998	Love	Team captain Hwang	MBC
1998	MBC Best Theater "How to Divorce"	Shin-joong	MBC
1998	Hope Lodge		KBS1
1998	Run Barefoot	Na Seo-chan	MBC
1998	MBC Best Theater "Mr. Gong Choon-taek's Contract Marriage"	Mr. Jang	MBC
1999	MBC Best Theater "Husband's Ugly Lover"	Kim Jung-do	MBC
1999	The Little Prince	Dad	KBS2
1999	MBC Best Theater "Dal-soo, Yes, The Boomerang"	Kang Dal-soo	MBC
1999	The Last War	Kim Tae-kyung	MBC
1999	Did You Ever Love?		KBS2
1999	Sweet Bride		SBS
2004	People of the Water Flower Village	Han Se-young	MBC
2004	MBC Best Theater "Winter Glory"	Young-ho	MBC
2004	War of the Roses	Bang Je-soo	MBC
2004	MBC Best Theater "Dal-soo, Son's Extracurricular Work"	Kang Dal-soo	MBC
2004	Magic	Cha Poong-ho	SBS
2004	Love Story in Harvard	Professor Oh Young-jae	SBS
2005	Sad Love Story	Cha Chang-man	MBC
2005	A Farewell to Sorrow	Han Sung-jae	KBS2
2005	MBC Best Theater "Dal-soo, Catching the Special Laws on Sex Trade"	Kang Dal-soo	MBC
2006	Princess Hours	Shin Chae-kyeong's father	MBC
2006	Let's Love Again	Park Do-sang	MBC
2006	Bad Family	Jo Gi-dong	SBS
2006	Hearts of Nineteen	Hong Moon-goo	KBS1
2006	My Beloved Sister	Husband of Kim Geon-woo's aunt	MBC
2007	Capital Scandal	Kim Tak-gu	KBS2
2007	The King and I	Choi Cham-bong	SBS
2008	Who Are You?	Son Il-gun	MBC
2008	Chunja's Special Day	Lee Dae-pal	MBC
2008	Gourmet	Director Han	SBS
2008	Innocent You	Kang Jung-yong	SBS
2009	The Return of Iljimae	Bae Seon-dal	MBC
2009	Creating Destiny	Han Kyung-tae	MBC
2010	Jejungwon	Watanabe	SBS
2010	Playful Kiss	Oh Ki-dong	MBC
2010	Your Heaven	President Yang	SBS
2010	Once Upon a Time in Saengchori	Lee Man-soo	tvN
2011	KBS Drama Special "Special Task Force MSS"	Kim Jung-soo	KBS2
2011	My Bittersweet Life	Hong Kyu-man	KBS1
2011	You're Here, You're Here, You're Really Here	Kim Gul-jong	MBN
2012	Take Care of Us, Captain	Choi Dal-ho	SBS
2013	Wonderful Mama	Oh Da-jung's father (guest, episodes 11 & 25)	SBS
2013	Potato Star 2013QR3	Na Se-dol	tvN
2013	Secret Love	Kang Woo-chul	KBS2
2013	Basketball	Hong Byeo-ri's father	tvN
2014	Gap-dong	Han Sang-hoon	tvN
2014	Glorious Day	Jung In-sung	SBS
2014	Lovers of Music	Choi Myung-sik	KBS2
2014	You Are the Only One	Song Deok-goo	KBS1
2015	Super Daddy Yeol	Han Man-ho	tvN
2016	Another Miss Oh	president Jang	tvN
2017	You Are Too Much	Jung Kang-sik	MBC
2018	The Rich Son	Lee Kye-Dong	MBC
2018	Return	Judge	SBS
2018	The Beauty Inside	Kang Dae-sik	JTBC
2022	The Driver	Cameo	MBN

=== Film ===
Year	Title	Role
1969	School Excursion	Island child
1975	Graduating School Girls	
1976	Prayer of a Girl	
1977	K&J	
1977	Good Bye, Sir!	
1977	Our World	
1983	The Memo of a 21-year-old	Im Tae-hwan
1987	Gorgeous Transformation	
1988	Don Quixote on Asphalt	Son
1988	Sunshine at Present	Friend
1989	My Love, Don Quixote	Min-ho (cameo)
1989	Shinsa-dong Gigolo	Dong-joon
1990	Hero Flash	Chan (Red Flash)
1991	Longing for Love	
1991	The Night Full of Stars	Woo Dong-sik
1992	His Excellency of Sae-al City	Jo Jin-sang
2005	Jenny, Juno	Juno's father
2016	Chasing	Police Commissioner

=== Variety/radio show ===
Year	Title	Notes/Ref.
1982	Spirit 11	Host
1992	Short Talk at Midnight	DJ
1995	The Pursuit of Happiness with Kim Soo-mi and Kang Nam-gil	DJ
1999	Wonderful Tonight with Im Baek-cheon	segment: "Millenium Challenge: Kang Nam-gil's; Final Challenge with Tobacco"
1999	Good Morning	Host

== Bibliography ==
Year	Title	Publisher
1998	Kang Nam-gil's TV Is Easier Than the Computer	YoungJin.com
1999	Kang Nam-gil's TV Is Easier Than the Internet	YoungJin.com
2001	Kang Nam-gil's Computer	YoungJin.com
2001	Kang Nam-gil's Internet	YoungJin.com
2003	New – I Can Do! Kang Nam-gil's Internet	YoungJin.com
2004	Kang Nam-gil's Computers Are Easy to Learn	YoungJin.com
2004	Kang Nam-gil's Oh! My God	YoungJin.com

== Awards and nominations ==
Year	Award	Category	Nominated work	Result
1972	TBC Broadcasting Awards	Special Award		Won
1999	MBC Drama Awards	Popularity Award		Won
1999	MBC Drama Awards	Talent of the Year		Won
2006	KBS Drama Awards	Best Supporting Actor	Hearts of Nineteen	Nominated
2007	KBS Drama Awards	Best Supporting Actor	Capital Scandal	Nominated
2009	MBC Drama Awards	Golden Acting Award, Veteran Actor	Creating Destiny	Won
2009	SBS Drama Awards	Best Supporting Actor in a Serial Drama	Innocent You	Nominated
2010	SBS Drama Awards	Best Supporting Actor in a Special Planning Drama	Jejungwon	Nominated
2011	KBS Drama Awards	Excellence Award, Actor in a Daily Drama	My Bittersweet Life	Nominated
2018	MBC Drama Awards	Best Supporting Actor in a Soap Opera	The Rich Son	Nominated
