= Under the Gun (TV series) =

2024 South Korean television series

- Promotional Poster
- Genre: Romance; Noir
- Written by: Lee Hae-ri
- Directed by: Hong Chung-gi
- Starring: Zuho; Jo Soo-min; Seo Ji-won
- Country of origin: South Korea
- Original language: Korean
- No. of episodes: 6

Production
- Running time: 22 minutes

Original release
- Network: Lifetime
- Release: April 12 – April 26, 2024

Under The Gun (Korean: 언더더건) is a 2024 South Korean romance noir television series for Lifetime. The drama is written by Lee Hae-ri, directed by Hong Chung-gi, and starring Zuho, Jo Soo-min and Seo Ji-won. It is also available for streaming on Viu and Viki in selected regions.

== Synopsis ==
When Ko Gun, the son of Korea's esteemed Hold'em expert Ko Jun Ha, finds his family facing financial ruin, he embarks on a mission to salvage their reputation by joining the Korean Poker League. Along the way, he crosses paths with the charismatic transfer student Se Young, who aspired to be a world-class pianist.

== Cast and characters ==
=== Main ===
- Zuho as Ko Gun

A student at Sunhwa High School who is also the son of a professional poker player in Korea.

- Jo Soo-min as Cha Se-young

A transfer student of Sunhwa High School who was studying abroad in Los Angeles. She dreams of becoming a pianist.

- Seo Ji-won as Joo Tae-ha

A pro-Hold'em player who considers Gun as his rival. He has a crush on Se-young for a long time.

=== Supporting ===
- Park Noh-shik as Ko Jun-ha

Gun's father who is one of the best Hold'em player in Korea.

- Ji Su-min as Lee Ji-min

Se Young's friend.

== Production ==
=== Filming ===
The filming began in June 2022 and was originally scheduled to broadcast in the later half of the year.

=== Music ===
Zuho, the male lead of the drama composed and wrote one of the drama's original soundtrack, "Here I Stay". The song was performed by Zuho and Jo Soo-min, the female lead of the drama.

== Episodes ==
No.	Title	Original release date (Note: 2 consecutive episodes release back to back every Friday night.)
1	"A Good Looking Guy"	April 12, 2024
Ko Gun's school life lacks any significant interests as his busy part-time schedules consume his time after classes. However, everything changes when Se Young, a transfer student from LA, joins his class and ends up sitting next to him. Initially indifferent, their frequent encounters gradually ignite a spark in Gun's life.
2	"Fate Or Coincidence"	April 12, 2024
Se Young firmly believes that fate dictates the frequent crossings of her path with Gun's, and she wastes no time in showing her affection for him. On the other hand, Gun, carrying the weight of his obligations, has little patience for frivolous romance. Despite this, Se Young's presence manages to stir some interest in him. Meanwhile, Gun's encounter with Tae Ha appears to be far from amicable.
3	"Gun And Se Young Kiss"	April 19, 2024
Ko Gun returns to the illegal gambling spot to make a few more bucks. However, he gets caught up in a bad hand and returns home with cuts and bruises. Meanwhile, as Se Young helps a drunk man home, she runs into Ko Gun at the drunk man's door.
4	"Gun's Sister's Health Worsens"	April 19, 2024
Se Young can't get enough of Gun, and she follows him everywhere, even to his part-time job at the convenience store. Gun takes her to Ji Chul's bar, and she learns about the upcoming Hold'em tournament. Meanwhile, Gun's sister's health deteriorates, forcing Gun to find a means to save her.
5	"All In"	April 26, 2024
Gun stands before the court for illegal gambling. With the help of petitions from his schoolmates, the court sentences him to 100 hours of community service, and he promises not to get involved in illegal gambling activities. Meanwhile, Gun continues to push Se Young away when he returns to school.
6	"Defying The Odds"	April 26, 2024
Gun is fuelled by a heartfelt determination to clinch victory in the 2022 KPL championship, yet his performance in the final game appears unpromising. Despite feeling trapped with unfavourable circumstances stacked against him, he remains resolute, driven by his deep love and dedication to Jun Hee, his father, and Se Young. Although the odds seem insurmountable, he refuses to concede defeat until the very end.

== Original soundtrack ==
The original soundtrack of Under the Gun was released on April 29, 2024, through music label MUSIC&NEW.

No.	Title	Lyrics	Music	Artist	Length
1.	"Fade Away"	Hwang Eun-jung; Jung Hae-min (Onclassa); Choi Seo-eun (Onclassa)	CR Kim; Kim Su-bin (Aiming); Kim Seung-chan	Hyolyn	03:45
2.	"Here I Stay"	Zuho; Jo Soo-min; Kim Su-bin (Aiming)	Zuho; CR Kim; Kim	Zuho, Jo Soo-min	03:34
3.	"There's No Reason" (이유가 안 돼)	Hwang Seo-young (Onclassa); Yoon Kyung-won	CR Kim; Kim Su-bin (Aiming); Cho Se-hui (Aiming)	Kim Min-ah	03:30
4.	"LMM (Losing My Mind)"	D-Hack	CR Kim; Kim Su-bin (Aiming); Cho Se-hui (Aiming); D-Hack	D-Hack	02:54
5.	"Last" (마지막))	Bloo; Cho Se-hui (Aiming); Yoon Kyung-won	CR Kim; Kim Su-bin (Aiming); Cho; Bloo	Bloo	03:02
