= The Fox Family =

- South Korean theatrical release poster
- Hangul: 구미호 가족
- Hanja: 九尾狐 家族
- RR: Gumiho gajok
- MR: Kumiho kajok
- Directed by: Lee Hyung-gon
- Written by: Jeon Hyeon-jin; Park Eun-ah
- Produced by: Shim Jae-myung; Lee Ha-na; Kim Hyeon-cheol
- Starring: Joo Hyun; Park Jun-gyu; Ha Jung-woo; Park Si-yeon; Ko Joo-yeon
- Cinematography: Choi Jin-woong
- Edited by: Gwon Gi-suk
- Music by: Bang Jun-seok; Lee Byung-hoon; Dalpalan
- Production companies: Myung Films; KD Media; Pancinema
- Distributed by: MK Pictures
- Release date: September 27, 2006
- Running time: 102 minutes
- Country: South Korea
- Language: Korean
- Budget: US$3.8 million
- Box office: US$806,638

The Fox Family (Korean: 구미호 가족; RR: Gumiho gajok) is a 2006 South Korean film. Made on a budget of ₩3.5 billion (US$3.8 million), the film is a musical comedy about the kumiho of Korean mythology.

== Plot ==
Disguising themselves as humans, a family of kumiho travel from their home in the mountains to the city. The kumiho can only truly become human if they consume a human liver during an eclipse that occurs once every thousand years, and with just thirty days to go they open a circus in the hope of attracting some victims. But the only person they succeed in capturing is conman Gi-dong, and things get complicated when the family's eldest daughter falls in love with him. In addition, a series of murders in the city brings the family under suspicion from a local police department.

== Cast ==
- Joo Hyun as Father fox
- Park Jun-gyu as Gi-dong, camera man
- Ha Jung-woo as Son fox
- Park Si-yeon as Older daughter fox
- Ko Joo-yeon as Younger daughter fox
- Sunwoo Yong-nyeo as Mother fox
- Park Chul-min as detective
- Woo Hyun as Mr. Hong
- Yoon Hyeon-sook as Ms. Hwang
- Wang Ji-hye as convenience store girl
- Kang Yu-mi as female reporter
- Kim Hee-ra as man living in the container
- Byun Joo-yeon as Gi-dong's daughter
- Byun Shin-ho as elderly lady Oh
- Lee Bong-kyu as bathhouse owner
- Hong Gyung-yeon as middle aged woman in cabaret
- Kim Young-woong as reporter

== Release ==
The Fox Family was released in South Korea on 27 September 2006, and on its opening weekend was ranked seventh at the box office with 39,025 admissions. The film went on to receive a total of 202,990 admissions nationwide, with a gross (as of 8 October 2006) of US$806,638.

In August 2007, The Fox Family was screened at the 3rd Jecheon International Music & Film Festival.
