= Seoul 1945 =

2006 South Korean period television series

- Promotional poster
- Genre: Period drama War; Drama; Romance
- Written by: Jung Sung-hee; Lee Han-ho
- Directed by: Yoon Chang-beom; Yoo Hyun-ki; Lee Jung-seob
- Starring: Ryu Soo-young; Han Eun-jung; So Yoo-jin; Kim Ho-jin; Park Sang-myun
- Country of origin: South Korea
- Original language: Korean
- No. of episodes: 71

Production
- Executive producer: Lee Sung-joo
- Producer: Jung Young-chul
- Running time: 60 minutes Saturdays and Sundays at 21:30 (KST)

Original release
- Network: KBS1
- Release: January 1 – September 26, 2006

Seoul 1945 (Korean: 서울 1945) is a 2006 South Korean period television series starring Ryu Soo-young, Han Eun-jung, So Yoo-jin, Kim Ho-jin, and Park Sang-myun. It aired on KBS1 from January 1 to September 26, 2006, on Saturdays and Sundays at 21:30 for 71 episodes.

Set around 1945 right after Korea's liberation from Japanese colonial rule when the nation was engulfed by ideological turmoil, the story revolves around the rivalry between Suk-kyoung (So), a renowned pianist and daughter of a rich pro-Japanese politician, and Hae-kyung (Han), a headstrong servant; both women love Woon-hyuk (Ryu), whose ambition to become a lawyer gets thwarted due to his political ideology.

== Plot ==
The series takes place during turbulent times in Korea, spanning from the end of the Japanese occupation to the eventual split of the country into North and South. The story revolves around the lives of four young adults who grew up together. Choi Woon-hyuk (Ryu Soo-young) is a child prodigy born into a family of poor miners; Kim Hae-kyung (Han Eun-jung) is the eldest daughter of tenant farmers; Lee Dong-woo (Kim Ho-jin) is the heir to a wealthy, well-connected family; and Moon Suk-kyung (So Yoo-jin) is the only child of an affluent and powerful political ally of Japan. In a blend of personal choices and circumstances beyond their control, each individual embarks on different paths that reflect the chaotic nature of the time as well as their true character. As their paths collide, love, friendship, loyalty, vengeance, moral conscience, and ideology become driving forces to irrevocably change the course of their lives.

== Cast ==
=== Main characters ===
- Ryu Soo-young as Choi Woon-hyuk
  - Kim Seok as young Woon-hyuk
- Han Eun-jung as Kim Ke-hee / Kim Hae-kyung
  - Ko Joo-yeon as young Kim Ke-hee / Hikaru
- So Yoo-jin as Moon Suk-kyung / Yukei
  - Park Eun-bin as young Suk-kyung
- Kim Ho-jin as Lee Dong-woo
  - Kim Soo-min as young Dong-woo
- Park Sang-myun as Park Chang-joo
  - Ko Kyu-pil as young Chang-joo

=== Supporting characters ===
- Jang Hang-sun as Kim Pan-chul, Ke-hee's father
- Go Doo-shim as Jung Hyang-geum, Ke-hee's mother
- Jo An as Kim Ma-ri / Kim Yeon-kyung, Ke-hee's sister
- Jung Han-yong as Choi Eun-kwan, Woon-hyuk's father
- Lee Deok-hee as Jo Soon-yi, Woon-hyuk's mother
- Park Shin-hye as Choi Geum-hee, Woon-hyuk's older sister
- Yoon Hye-kyung as Choi Eun-hee, Woon-hyuk's younger sister
  - Jin Ji-hee as young Eun-hee
- Kim Yeong-cheol as Baron Moon Jung-kwan, Suk-kyung's father
- Lee Bo-hee as Ame Kaori, Baron Moon's mistress
- Hong Yo-seob as Moon Dong-ki, Suk-kyung's uncle
- Kim Kyung-sook as Yoon Jung-ja
- Choi Jong-won as Lee In-pyung, Dong-woo's father
- Kim Se-ah as Jo Young-eun, Dong-woo's governess
- Jo Soo-min as Mal-hee
- Son Jong-beom as Park Sung-joo
- Lee Byung-wook as Oh Chul-hyung
- Lee Gun as Kim Ki-soo
- Han Min as Choi Song-hee
- Kwon Sung-deok as Syngman Rhee
- Yoon Seung-won as Jung Bong-doo
- Lee Mi-young as Ji Kye-ok
- Shin Hyun-tak as Jung Dol-yi
- Kim Dong-hyun as Chang Taek-sang
- Kim Hyo-won as Pak Hon-yong
- Shin Goo as Lyuh Woon-hyung
- Park Chul-ho as chairman Kim il Sung
- Song Yong-tae as vice chairman
- Park Yong-jin as North Korean officer
- Hyun Won as North Korean officer
- Jang Dong-jik as South Korean soldier
- Kim Ji-young

== Awards and nominations ==
| Year | Award | Category | Recipient | Result |
|---|---|---|---|---|
| 2006 | KBS Drama Awards | Top Excellence Award, Actor | Ryu Soo-young | Won |
| 2006 | KBS Drama Awards | Top Excellence Award, Actor | Shin Goo | Won |
| 2006 | KBS Drama Awards | Excellence Award, Actress | Han Eun-jung | Won |
| 2006 | KBS Drama Awards | Best Supporting Actor | Park Sang-myun | Won |
| 2006 | KBS Drama Awards | Best Young Actor | Kim Seok | Won |
| 2006 | KBS Drama Awards | Best Young Actress | Ko Joo-yeon | Nominated |
| 2007 | 43rd Baeksang Arts Awards | Best Drama | Seoul 1945 | Won |
| 2007 | 43rd Baeksang Arts Awards | Best Actor (TV) | Ryu Soo-young | Nominated |
| 2007 | 43rd Baeksang Arts Awards | Best Director (TV) | Yoon Chang-beom | Nominated |
| 2007 | 43rd Baeksang Arts Awards | Best Screenplay (TV) | Lee Han-ho, Jung Sung-hee | Nominated |

== Controversy ==
At a press conference held in June 2006, 254 right-wing conservative groups accused the state-run KBS network of distorting history. They complained that Seoul 1945 had a left-wing bias, with its portrayal of Syngman Rhee as "a Japanese collaborator whose lust for power leads him to abandon a unified Korea, while characters of the Left are usually portrayed as considerate and concerned for the future of the nation," and that the drama accuses Rhee and others of involvement in the assassination of the center-left leader Lyuh Woon-hyung. They asked for a halt to the broadcast and threatened a campaign to boycott the television subscription fee.

In July 2006, Rhee In-soo, adopted son of South Korea's first president Syngman Rhee, and Jang Byung-hye, daughter of former prime minister Jang Taek-sang, filed a lawsuit against the producers of Seoul 1945, claiming that the drama distorts history and belittles the achievements of their late fathers.

In May 2007, Seoul Central District Court dismissed the lawsuit, stating that since the drama is based on fiction rather than historical facts, KBS is not responsible for defamation of character. In its ruling, the court said, "Such a description is part of artistic expression, which should be respected in producing soap opera that is based on fiction rather than facts." The court also said since there are historical documents that support the idea that former President Rhee was pro-Japanese and pro-American, the drama did not seriously distort facts.
