= Jo Soo-min =

South Korean actress (born 1999)

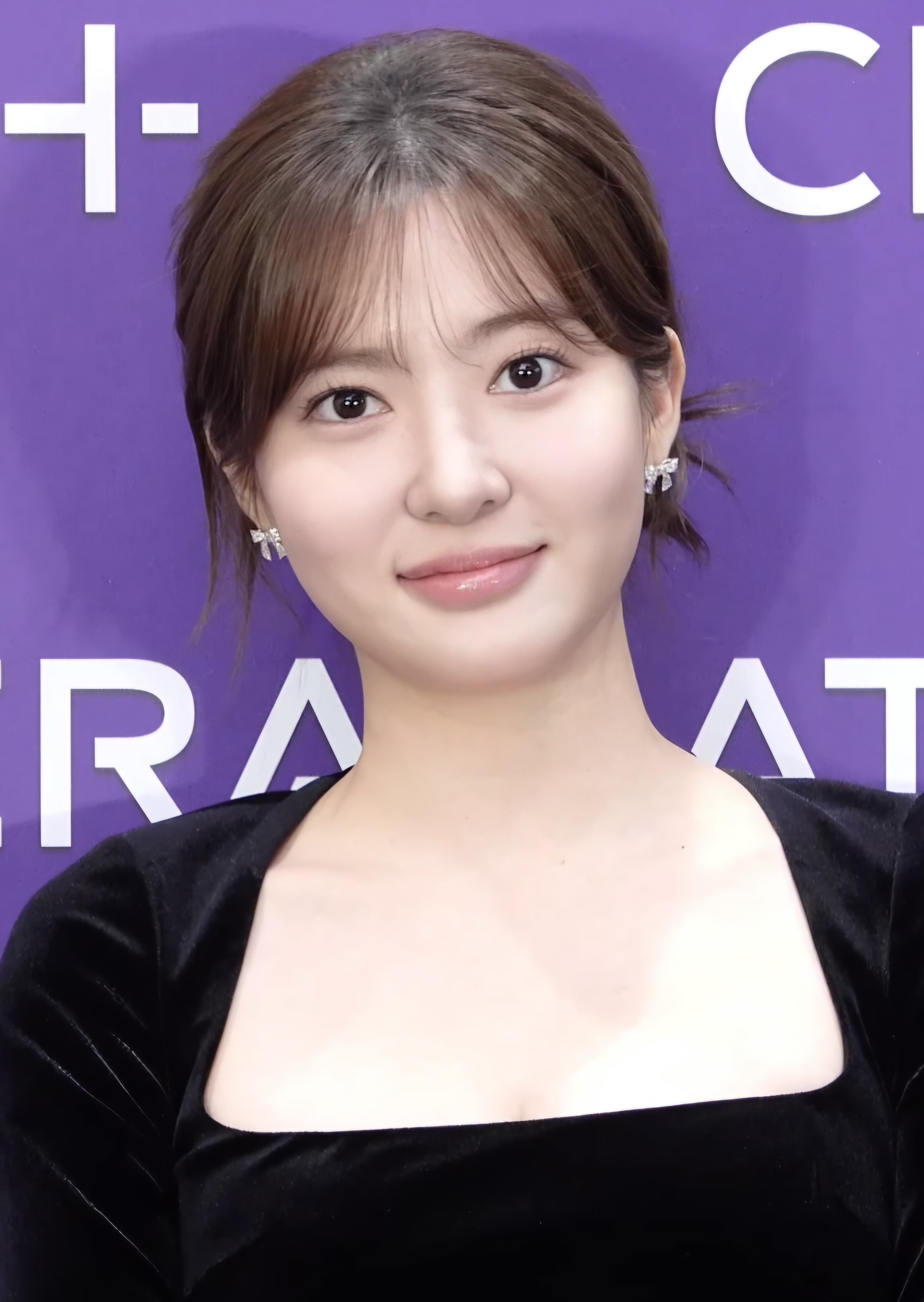
- Jo in November 2024
- Born: March 5, 1999 (age 27); South Korea
- Education: Hankuk University of Foreign Studies (Chinese Language and Literature)
- Occupation: Actress
- Years active: 2006–present
- Agent: Outer Universe

Korean name
- Hangul: 조수민
- RR: Jo Sumin
- MR: Cho Sumin

Jo Soo-min (Korean: 조수민; born March 5, 1999) is a South Korean actress who began her career as a child actress in 2006. She is known for her roles in television dramas such as The Penthouse: War in Life and Royal Secret Agent. Over the course of her career, she has gained recognition for her performances in both supporting and leading roles and has received awards, including at the KBS Drama Awards.

== Filmography ==
=== Film ===
Year	Title	Role	Ref.
2008	His Last Gift	Jo Se-hee	

=== Television series ===
Year	Title	Role	Ref.
2006	Seoul 1945	Mal-hee	
2006	Famous Chil Princesses	Lee So-ra	
2006	The Invisible Man, Choi Jang-soo	Choi Sol-mi	
2008	Mom's Dead Upset	Lee So-ra	
2009	Hometown of Legends	Bo-ri	
2019	Touch Your Heart	Kim Yoon-ha	
2019	The Running Mates: Human Rights	Han Yoon-jin	
2019	Birthday Letter	Yeo II-ae	
2020	The Penthouse: War in Life	Anna Lee / Min Seol-ah	
2020–2021	Royal Secret Agent	Kang Soon-ae	
2022–2023	The Forbidden Marriage	Hwa-yoon (Cameo)	
2024	Marry You	Jung Ha-na	

=== Web series ===
Year	Title	Role	Ref.
2020	Ending Again	Cha In-young	
2020	Ending Again Special	Cha In-young	
2023	Under the Gun	Cha Se-young	

=== Television shows ===
Year	Title	Role	Notes	Ref.
2022	Style Me	Host	Season 2	

== Awards and nominations ==
Name of the award ceremony, year presented, category, nominee of the award, and the result of the nomination
Award ceremony	Year	Category	Nominee(s) / work(s)	Result	Ref.
KBS Drama Awards	2006	Best Young Actress	The Invisible Man, Choi Jang-soo & Famous Chil Princesses	Nominated	
KBS Drama Awards	2008	Best Young Actress	Mom's Dead Upset	Nominated	
KBS Drama Awards	2019	Best Actress in a One-Act/Special/Short Drama	Birthday Letter	Won	
SBS Drama Awards	2020	Best New Actress	The Penthouse: War in Life	Nominated	
