= Yoon So-yi =

South Korean actress (born 1985)

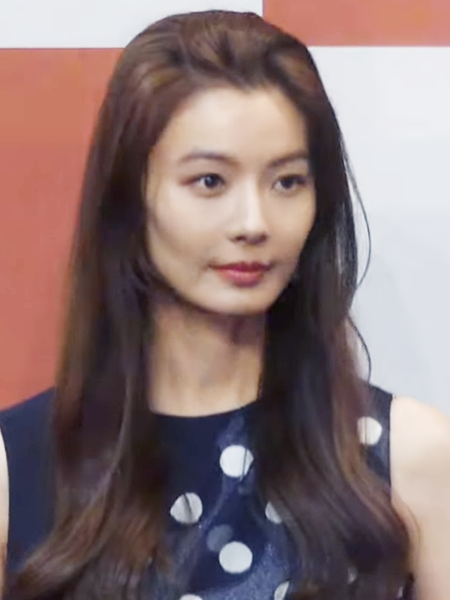
- Yoon in May 2019
- Born: Moon So-yi; January 5, 1985 (age 41); Seongdong District, Seoul, South Korea
- Education: Dongguk University
- Occupation: Actress
- Years active: 2001–present
- Agent: EL Park
- Spouse: Jo Sung-yoon (m. 2017)
- Children: 1

Korean name
- Hangul: 문소이
- RR: Mun Soi
- MR: Mun Soi

Stage name
- Hangul: 윤소이
- Hanja: 尹素怡
- RR: Yun Soi
- MR: Yun Soi

Yoon So-yi (Korean: 윤소이; born January 5, 1985), birth name Moon So-yi, is a South Korean actress. She debuted as a print and commercial model, then began acting in Ryoo Seung-wan's action-comedy film Arahan in 2004, followed by Shadowless Sword in 2005. Yoon has had leading roles in television dramas, notably in Goodbye Solo (2006), Glass Castle (2008), Hero (2009), and Warrior Baek Dong-soo (2011).

== Career ==
Yoon So-yi made her entertainment debut as a model in Graffiti Magazine in 2001. After a few years of print and commercial modeling, she auditioned for Ryoo Seung-wan's action comedy Arahan in 2004. Based on a popular South Korean comic, Arahan explored the consequences of unleashing an ancient evil spirit into a modern city, with Yoon's character part of a hidden school of ancient masters who train a naive young policeman to fight this evil force. Yoon underwent strict training for six months in a film action school, where she had to overcome her phobia of heights. The film was a relative commercial success, with one review describing her as "tall and attractive in an excellently non-cutesy way." She received a Best New Actress nomination at the 2004 Blue Dragon Film Awards.

Yoon next starred in the TV drama Say You Love Me, a dark, twisted love story between four people. This led to a friendship with her co-star Kim Rae-won, with whom she starred in a series of advertisements for Samsung Digital Plaza. When Kim later launched his own management company Bless Entertainment, she would also join his stable of stars.

After playing Jung Joon-ho's love interest in The Twins, Yoon was cast in Shadowless Sword, a wuxia martial arts epic set in ancient Korea. In the role of a beautiful young swordswoman who protects the future king, Yoon said that she was inspired by Anita Mui in The Heroic Trio, and that the strong-willed female character appealed to her. She learned wushu for three months in Korea, then wire action from the Chinese stunt team.

In 2006, she became part of the ensemble cast of Goodbye Solo, written by renowned drama writer Noh Hee-kyung. Even though her dramas do not attract a large number of viewers, Noh has gained a cult following for her in-depth portrayal of ordinary characters, taking a more human natural approach through realistic and yet emotional lines. Goodbye Solo featured seven characters of different generations and backgrounds, as they reflect on human nature and relationships. Yoon would later work again with mostly the same crew in the 2-episode TV special Several Questions That Make Us Happy.

Goodbye Solo's writer Noh and veteran actress Bae Jong-ok introduced Yoon to Join Together Society (JTS), a Seoul-based Buddhist international relief agency (Yoon herself is a Buddhist). Since then she has been extremely active in charity work for JTS, spearheading street fund drives and various programs to benefit underprivileged children in North Korea and developing countries.

An athlete in junior high, Yoon was a Sports Model major at Dongduk Women's University, but eventually dropped out due to showbiz commitments. She later enrolled in Dongguk University as a Theatre and Film major, slowing down her acting activities to focus on her studies and becoming known in the Korean press as one of the very few celebrity model students, with regular attendance and good grades. Yoon graduated in 2011.

Her next project Auction House attempted a different format from the standard serialized Korean drama. The twelve-episode first season in 2007 had four directors and four writers, airing one episode every week, with each director producing his own segment in his own style, crossing genres. The episodic format was not a hit with Korean audiences (despite a second season focusing on plastic surgeons with a completely different cast).

Yoon then played a former reporter struggling to adjust to life as a chaebol daughter-in-law in Glass Castle; the drama was a modest success in 2008. She was cast as a last-minute replacement leading lady in 2009 in the quirky Lee Joon-gi-starrer Hero. Despite being praised as a well-acted and solid drama, Hero received low ratings. Yoon returned to the big screen in Try to Remember, about lovers in the past whose love transcends time and brings them together in the present day, premiered at the 2010 Puchon International Fantastic Film Festival.

She was cast as Queen Seondeok in a specially commissioned 20-minute film for the 2011 Gyeongju World Culture Expo. Titled Byeongnucheon ("The Bracelet of Blue Tears"), the fantasy adventure aimed to spearhead Korea's nascent stereoscopic film industry, combining live action sequences with 3D animated computer graphics.

Later that year, Yoon's period drama Warrior Baek Dong-soo brought in high viewership ratings, topping its timeslot for 3 straight months. She immediately followed that with the Channel A cable series Color of Woman, replacing Eugene as the romantic comedy lead when the latter dropped out in the aftermath of her sister's car accident.

For her first variety MC job, Yoon co-hosted the 2012 televised magicians tournament King of Magic, which aired on cable for three weeks.

A supporting role followed in 2013 spy action series Iris II: New Generation, in which she played a South Korean college student who defects to North Korea, trains in the special forces and counter-terrorism units, then returns to her home country as a North Korean spy. She headlined the 2014 daily drama Angel's Revenge in the role of a nun who avenges her sister, then joined the cast of police procedural Hidden Identity in 2015.

In May 2016, Yoon signed with new management agency JS Pictures.

== Personal life ==
Yoon married musical actor Jo Sung-yoon in May 2017. On September 13, 2021, she posted a photo on Instagram saying she was pregnant and expected to give birth soon Her daughter was born in November 2021.

== Filmography ==
=== Film ===
Year	Title	Role
2004	Arahan	Ahn Eui-jin
2005	The Twins	Oh Soon-hee
2005	Shadowless Sword	Yeon So-ha
2010	Try to Remember	In-woo
2011	The Bracelet of Blue Tears (Gyeongju World Culture Expo promotional film)	Queen Seondeok of Silla
2015	Midnight Garage	
2018	Brothers in Heaven	Chan-mi

=== Television ===
Year	Title	Role
2004	Say You Love Me	Seo Young-chae
2006	Goodbye Solo	Chung Soo-hee
2007	Several Questions That Make Us Happy	Ji-soo
2007	Auction House	Cha Yeon-soo
2008	Glass Castle	Jung Min-joo
2009	Hero	Joo Jae-in
2011	Warrior Baek Dong-soo	Hwang Jin-joo
2011	Color of Woman	Byun So-ra
2012	King of Magic	MC
2013	Iris II: New Generation	Park Tae-hee
2014	Angel's Revenge	Lee Seon-yoo
2015	Some Guys, Some Girls	
2015	Let's Eat 2	Mysterious woman (ep. 18)
2015	Hidden Identity	Jang/Lee Min-joo
2016	Yeah, That's How It Is	Yoo Se-Hee
2018	The Last Empress	Seo Kang-hee
2018	Tale of Fairy	Immortal Izy
2019	A Place in the Sun	Yoon Si-wol
2019	Doctor Detective	Yoon Si-wol (cameo)
2020	Get Revenge	Goo Eun-hye
2022	Becoming Witch	Yang Jin-ah

=== Music video appearances ===
Year	Song title	Artist
2002	"Rainbow"	Cho Kyu-chan
2003	"A Girl's Love Story"	Han So-ri
2010	"Words That I Can Say"	T-Max
2013	"The Letter"	Davichi

=== Commercials ===
Year	Product
2002	Entia for Coreana; SK Telecom June
2003	Anycall; Haitai Green Tea Ice Cream; Ziozia; ZOOC; NII; Hair Pack Nano Therapy; Lotte Iote Chocolate
2004	Gatorade Ice; Samsung Digital Plaza
2005	Samsung Digital Plaza
2006	Samsung Digital Plaza; KOOlHaaS
2009	Paris Baguette; Clinique YES! campaign
2011	Kiara; Sun Cruise Resort; Inti Placenta
2012	Inti Placenta

== Awards and nominations ==
Year	Award	Category	Nominated work	Result
2004	41st Grand Bell Awards	Best New Actress	Arahan	Nominated
2004	25th Blue Dragon Film Awards	Best New Actress	Arahan	Nominated
2004	MBC Drama Awards	Best New Actress	Say You Love Me	Nominated
2008	SBS Drama Awards	Excellence Award, Actress in a Serial Drama	Glass Castle	Nominated
2008	SBS Drama Awards	New Star Award	Glass Castle	Won
2009	4th Asia Model Festival Awards	Special Model Award	—N/a	Won
2011	SBS Drama Awards	Excellence Award, Actress in a Special Planning Drama	Warrior Baek Dong-soo	Won
2014	KBS Drama Awards	Excellence Award, Actress in a Daily Drama	Angel's Revenge	Nominated
2019	27th Korean Culture and Entertainment Awards	Best Actress in a Drama	A Place in the Sun	Won
2019	KBS Drama Awards	Excellence Award, Actress in a Daily Drama	A Place in the Sun	Nominated
2022	Asia Model Awards	Popularity Award, Actress	—N/a	Won
