= Goodbye Solo (TV series) =

South Korean television series

- Promotional poster
- Genre: Romance; Drama; Mystery
- Written by: Noh Hee-kyung
- Directed by: Ki Min-soo; Hwang In-hyuk
- Starring: Chun Jung-myung; Yoon So-yi; Kim Min-hee; Bae Jong-ok; Lee Jae-ryong; Kim Nam-gil; Na Moon-hee
- Country of origin: South Korea
- Original language: Korean
- No. of episodes: 16

Production
- Producer: Hong Sung-deok
- Production locations: Korea; Bali
- Running time: Wednesdays and Thursdays at 21:55 (KST)

Original release
- Network: KBS2
- Release: 1 March – 20 April 2006

Goodbye Solo (Korean: 굿바이 솔로; RR: Gutbai sollo) is a 2006 South Korean television series starring Chun Jung-myung, Yoon So-yi, Kim Min-hee, Bae Jong-ok, Lee Jae-ryong, Kim Nam-gil, and Na Moon-hee. It aired on KBS2 from March 1 to April 20, 2006 on Wednesdays and Thursdays at 21:55 for 16 episodes.

In the urban melodrama, seven lead characters of different generations and backgrounds are all haunted by loneliness; they gradually interact and form a "family" borne out of emotional connection and mutual understanding.

Renowned for her in-depth, realistic portrayals of ordinary lives, writer Noh Hee-kyung said that the drama's theme is that all human beings are beautiful just the way they are, simply by existing in the world.

== Plot ==
Kim Min-ho (Chun Jung-myung) is the son of a rich business tycoon, but works as a bartender. Because he is illegitimate, he feels estranged from his family, and has a strained relationship with his father (Jang Yong), his older brother Min-jae (Kim Hyun-kyun), and especially his mother (Jung Ae-ri). Min-ho has been secretly in love for a long time with Chung Soo-hee (Yoon So-yi), an artist who is also the girlfriend of his best friend, Yoo Ji-an (Kim Nam-gil). Soo-hee despises her mother for her constantly changing partners, and thus is determined to be faithful to Ji-an, despite her growing attraction to Min-ho. Ji-an works as a secretary for Min-ho's father and his lies hide painful family secrets. Cheerful, seemingly frivolous Choi Mi-ri (Kim Min-hee) is a restaurant owner who is living with third-rate gangster Kang Ho-chul (Lee Jae-ryong). Despite their love for each other, Mi-ri agonizes over Ho-chul's refusal to marry her and her family's disapproval. Oh Young-sook (Bae Jong-ok), who calls herself "crazy," is a flamboyant and eccentric divorcee who recently moved next door to Mi-ri and Ho-chul's apartment. All these people are linked together by an old woman named Mi-young (Na Moon-hee), the mysterious owner of an eatery in the neighborhood, who hasn't spoken a single word in decades.

== Cast ==
=== Main characters ===
- Chun Jung-myung as Kim Min-ho
- Yoon So-yi as Chung Soo-hee
- Kim Min-hee as Choi Mi-ri
- Bae Jong-ok as Oh Young-sook
- Lee Jae-ryong as Kang Ho-chul
- Kim Nam-gil as Yoo Ji-an
- Na Moon-hee as Mi-young

=== Supporting characters ===
- Jang Yong as Kim Joo-min
- Jung Ae-ri as Park Kyung-hye
- Kim Hyun-kyun as Kim Min-jae
- Uhm Soo-jung as Im Ji-soo
- Kim Mi-kyung as Ahn Hae-young
- Yoon Yoo-sun as Lee Mi-ja
- Park Ji-il as Young-sook's husband
- Kim Tae-hoon as Shin Sik
- Jang Tae-sung as Moodugi
- Joo Jin-mo as Ji-ahn's father
- So Do-bi as Yong-woon
