= Kim Hye-jin =

Kim Hye-jin (김혜진) may refer to:

- Kim Hye-jin (actress) (born 1975), South Korean actress
- Kim Hyejin (born 1983), South Korean writer (author of Concerning My Daughter)
- Kim Hye-jin (gymnast) (born 1991), South Korean rhythmic gymnast
- Kim Hye-jin (swimmer) (born 1994), South Korean swimmer
- Hyejin Kim (novelist), South Korean novelist (author of Jia: A Novel of North Korea)

== See also ==
- Kim Hae-jin (born 1997), South Korean figure skater
