= The Scarlet Letter (2004 film) =

- Film poster
- Hangul: 주홍글씨
- Hanja: 朱紅글씨
- RR: Juhong geulssi
- MR: Chuhong kŭlssi
- Directed by: Byun Hyuk
- Written by: Byun Hyuk; Kang Hyeon-joo
- Based on: The Scarlet Letter; 1850 novel by Nathaniel Hawthorne
- Produced by: Lee Seung-jae
- Starring: Han Suk-kyu; Lee Eun-ju; Sung Hyun-ah; Uhm Ji-won
- Cinematography: Choe Hyeon-gi
- Edited by: Hahm Sung-won
- Music by: Lee Jae-jin
- Distributed by: Showbox
- Release date: October 28, 2004
- Running time: 118 minutes
- Country: South Korea
- Language: Korean

The Scarlet Letter (Korean: 주홍글씨) is a 2004 South Korean erotic thriller film about a police detective who investigates a murder case while struggling to hang onto his relationships with his wife and mistress. The film's title is taken from the 1850 novel of the same name. It is the second film by La Femis-graduate and academic Byun Hyuk (Daniel H. Byun) after the Dogme 95 film Interview (2000), and starred Han Suk-kyu, Lee Eun-ju, Sung Hyun-ah and Uhm Ji-won. The film debuted as the closing film of the Pusan International Film Festival in 2004. The film is based on novelist Kim Young-ha's short stories A Meditation On Mirror and Photo Shop Murder.

The Scarlet Letter was released on October 28, 2004, on South Korea. The film was Lee's last feature-length acting performance before her death in February 2005.

== Plot ==
Lee Ki-hoon is an alpha male homicide detective: intelligent and with animal instincts. His wife, classical cellist Han Soo-hyun, is submissive and seemingly perfect. Meanwhile, he is carrying on a passionate affair with his mistress Choi Ga-hee, a sultry jazz singer at a nightclub. Ki-hoon lives a double life by moving back and forth between these two women, who also happen to be schoolmates from high school. One day Ki-hoon goes to a murder scene and there he meets Ji Kyung-hee, a woman accused of murdering her husband.

== Cast ==
- Han Suk-kyu – Lee Ki-hoon
- Lee Eun-ju – Choi Ga-hee
- Uhm Ji-won – Han Soo-hyun
- Sung Hyun-ah – Ji Kyung-hee
- Kim Jin-geun – Jung Myung-sik
- Kim Min-sung – Detective Jo
- Jung In-gi – Detective Ahn
- Choi Kyu-hwan – Detective Choi
- Kim Hye-jin – Oh Yeon-sim
- Do Yong-gu – President Han
- Seol Ji-yoon – Madam

== Reception ==
Despite Lee Eun-ju's prior experience with depicting sex and nudity in Virgin Stripped Bare by Her Bachelors (2000), she came under the scrutiny of Korean press and netizens, for the highly emotional sex scenes and the notorious "trunk scene" in The Scarlet Letter which is regarded as "one of the most shocking and intense scenes in the history of Korean film." It is speculated her demanding role and its public scrutiny, had compounded and overlapped with an existing variety of family, financial, career, and insomnia issues. Her severe depression ended in suicide in February 2005, and the tragic conclusion has since become the central focus in popular perception and interpretation of the film, this particular one being her last.

Director Kim Ki-duk, no stranger to controversy over his own films, is quoted by Chinese film magazine "Movie Watch" (看電影) as singling out The Scarlet Letter as among the key Korean dramas from recent years. He subsequently cast Sung Hyun-ah, who had risen to prominence with her role in The Scarlet Letter, as the heroine in his Time.

At the film's premiere in Japan, veteran actress Kumiko Akiyoshi praised the lead performances and likened the film to a landmark in erotic thrillers after Basic Instinct and Fatal Attraction.

== Awards and nominations ==
2004 Korean Association of Film Critics Awards

- Top Ten Films of the Year

2004 Blue Dragon Film Awards

- Nomination – Best Actor – Han Suk-kyu
- Nomination – Best Actress – Lee Eun-ju
- Nomination – Best Supporting Actress – Uhm Ji-won
- Nomination – Best Music – Lee Jae-jin

2005 Baeksang Arts Awards

- Nomination – Best Actress – Lee Eun-ju

2005 Grand Bell Awards

- Nomination – Best Actress – Lee Eun-ju
- Nomination – Best Art Direction – Kim Ji-soo
- Nomination – Best Costume Design – Jo Yun-mi
