= All About Eve (Philippine TV series) =

2009 Philippine television drama series

- Title card
- Genre: Drama
- Based on: All About Eve (2000) by Park Ji-Hyun
- Developed by: Dode Cruz
- Directed by: Gil Tejada Jr.; Mac Alejandre; Eric Quizon
- Starring: Sunshine Dizon; Iza Calzado
- Theme music composer: Tats Faustino; Jose Ma. F. Bartolome; Richard Gonzales
- Opening theme: "All About..." by Krissa Mae Arrieta, Martha Joy and Daiana Menezes
- Ending theme: "Hanggang Kailan" by Jolina Magdangal
- Country of origin: Philippines
- Original language: Tagalog
- No. of episodes: 63

Production
- Executive producer: Edlyn Tallada-Abuel
- Production locations: Metro Manila, Philippines; Singapore
- Camera setup: Multiple-camera setup
- Running time: 30–45 minutes
- Production company: GMA Entertainment TV

Original release
- Network: GMA Network
- Release: March 9 – June 5, 2009

All About Eve is a 2009 Philippine television drama series broadcast by GMA Network. The series is based on a 2000 South Korean television series of the same title. Directed by Gil Tejada Jr., Mac Alejandre and Eric Quizon, it stars Sunshine Dizon in the title role and Iza Calzado. It premiered on March 9, 2009 on the network's Telebabad line up. The series concluded on June 5, 2009, with a total of 63 episodes.

== Cast and characters ==
Cast

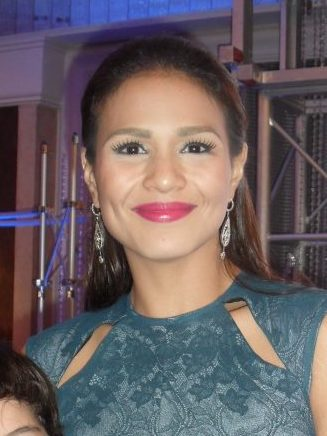
Iza Calzado

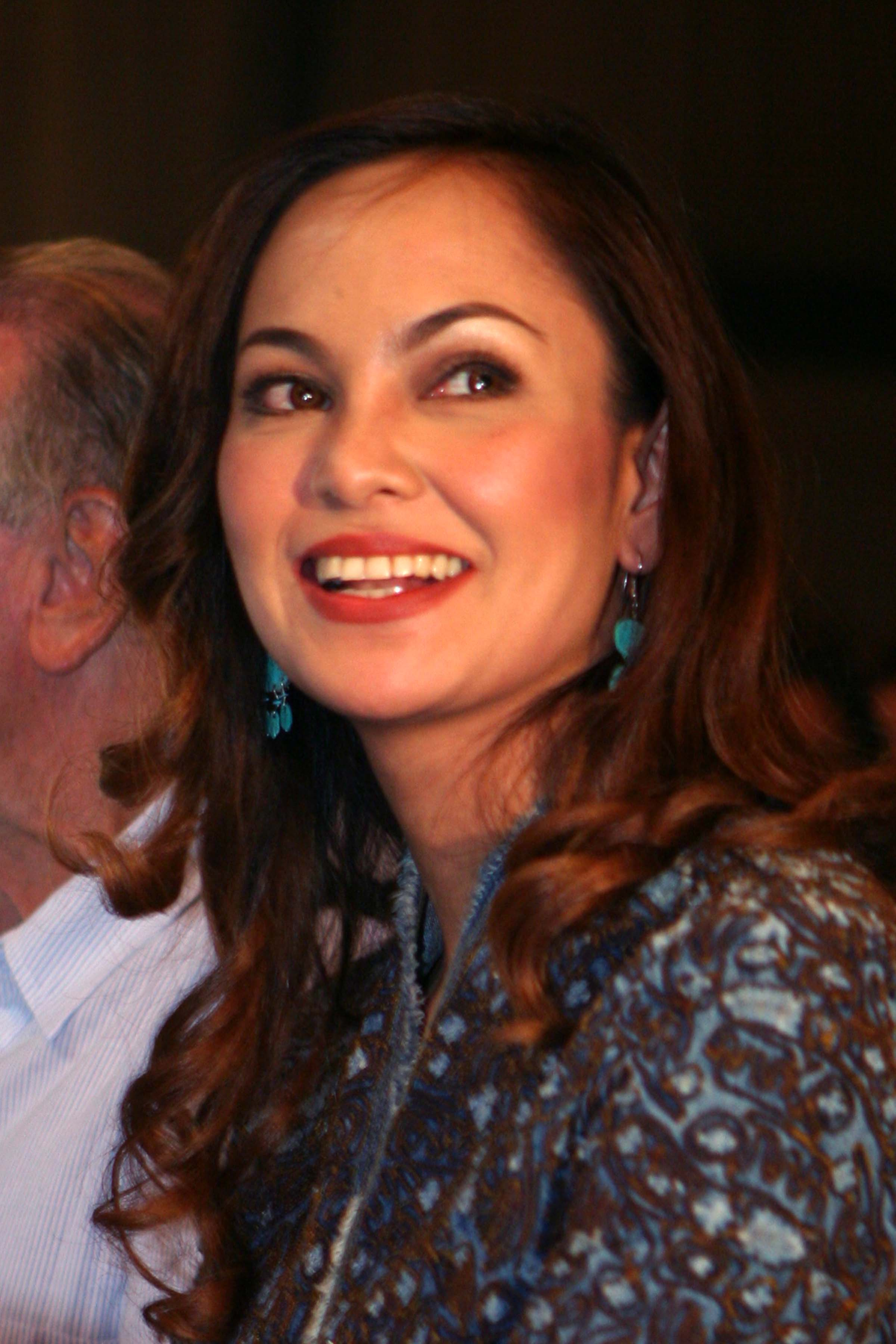
Eula Valdez

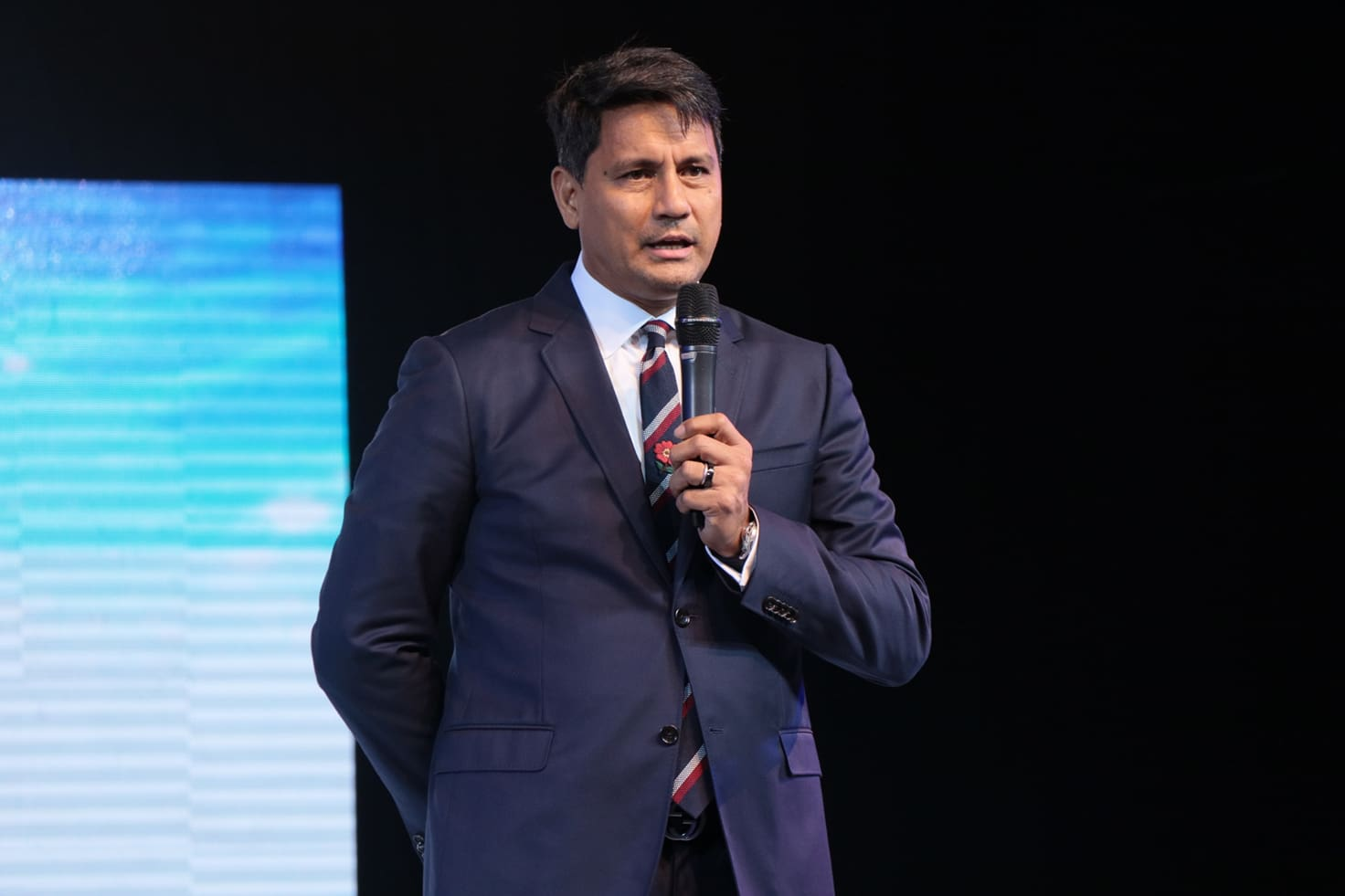
Richard Gomez

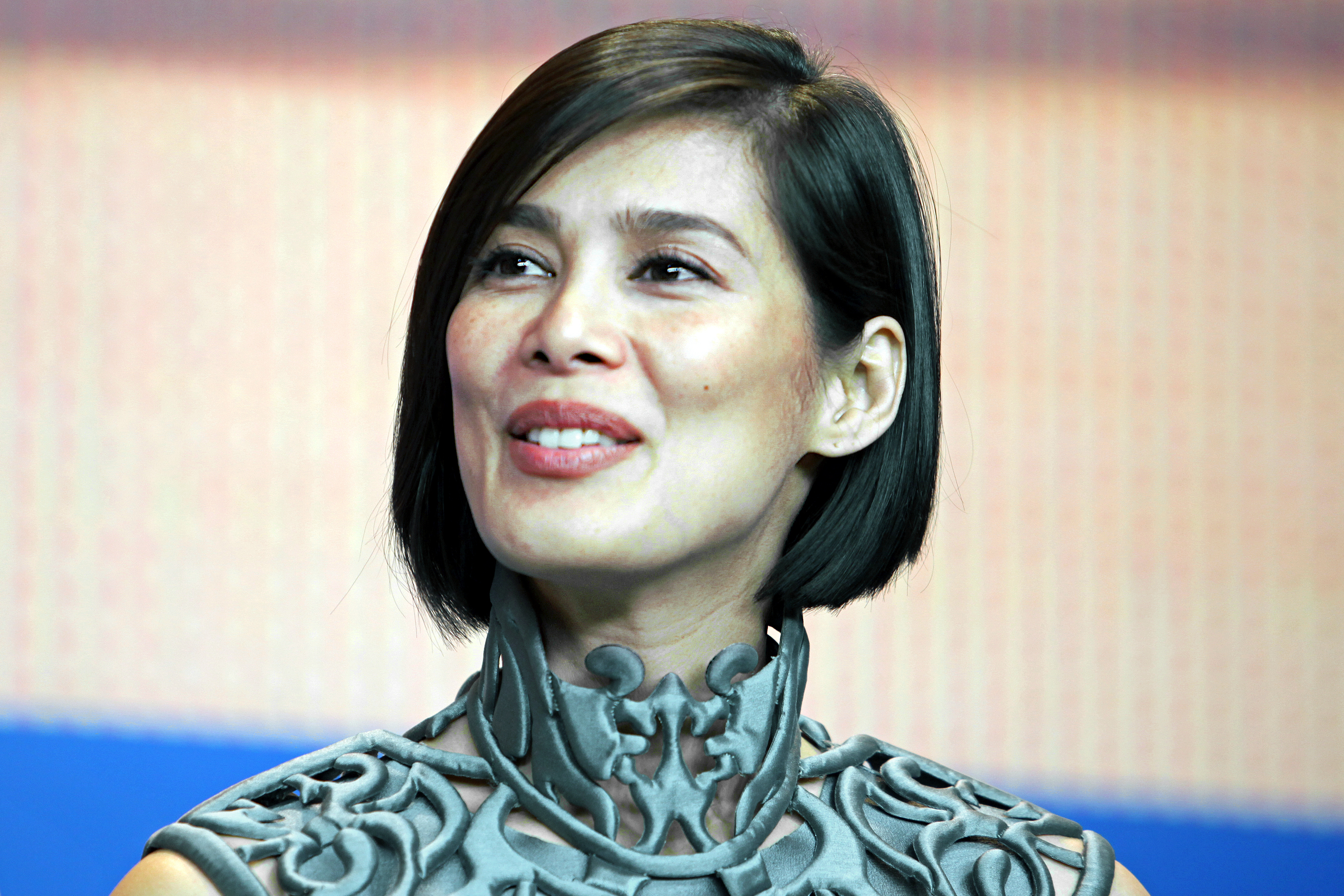
Angel Aquino

Lead cast

- Sunshine Dizon as Erika "Eve" Alegre Reyes
- Iza Calzado as Nicole Gonzales

Supporting cast

- Eula Valdez as Alma Bautista
- Jean Garcia as Katrina Alegre
- Mark Anthony Fernandez as Kenneth Villareal
- Alfred Vargas as Warren Bautista
- Richard Gomez as Frederico Gonzales
- Celia Rodriguez as Concepcion Gonzales
- Keempee de Leon as Paul
- Eric Quizon as Robert Villareal
- Angel Aquino as Judith Tebamo
- Gabby Eigenmann as Max
- Marky Lopez as Joel

Guest cast

- Ian de Leon as Mando Reyes
- Ina Raymundo as Lisa Cortez-Gonzales
- Carmen Ronda as Luisa Villareal
- Odette Khan as Warden Rita
- Sandy Talag as younger Erika
- Chelsea Eugenio as younger Nicole
- JM Reyes as younger Warren
- Chariz Solomon as Jill
- Mel Kimura as Cherry
- Joanne Quintas as Nicole's co-worker
- Jenny Miller as Nicole's co-worker
- Micheal Roy Jornales as Robert's henchman

== Development ==
All About Eve is a 2000 South Korean television series broadcast by MBC TV. Written by Park Ji-hyun and Oh Soo-yeon and directed by Lee Jin-suk and Han Chul-soo, it starred Jang Dong-gun, Chae Rim, Han Jae-suk and Kim So-yeon. In 2003, it was aired in the Philippines through GMA Network.

== Production ==
Principal photography commenced in November 2008. Filming concluded on May 20, 2009.

== Ratings ==
According to AGB Nielsen Philippines' Mega Manila household television ratings, the pilot episode of All About Eve earned a 26.1% rating. The final episode scored a 31.8% rating.
