= Lee Yoo-jin =

Lee Yoo-jin may refer to:

- Lee Yoo-jin (actress) (born 1977), South Korean actress
- Lee Yoo-jin (actor) (born 1992), South Korean actor
