= 이현우 =

Lee Hyun-woo may refer to:

- Lee Hyun-woo (actor, born 1993)
- Lee Hyun-woo (entertainer, born 1966)
