= Lee Eun-ju =

South Korean actress (1980–2005)

- Lee in 2004
- Born: December 22, 1980; Gunsan, North Jeolla Province, South Korea
- Died: February 22, 2005 (aged 24); Bundang, Seongnam, South Korea
- Cause of death: Suicide by hanging
- Resting place: Chungah Park, Goyang, Gyeonggi Province
- Other name: Lee Eun-joo
- Education: Dankook University (2005); BA in Theatre and Film
- Occupation: Actress
- Years active: 1997–2005
- Agent: Namoo Actors (2005)
- Height: 170 cm (5 ft 7 in)

Korean name
- Hangul: 이은주
- Hanja: 李恩宙
- RR: I Eunju
- MR: I Ŭnju

Lee Eun-ju (Korean: 이은주; December 22, 1980 – February 22, 2005) was a South Korean actress. She was best known for the films Oh! Soo-jung (2000), Bungee Jumping of Their Own (2001), Lovers' Concerto (2002), Taegukgi: The Brotherhood of War (2004) and The Scarlet Letter (2004) and for the television series KAIST (1999) and Phoenix (2004). Despite a brief career spanning six to eight years, she amassed a filmography of acclaimed performances, quickly becoming one of South Korea's most promising and celebrated young talents. Highly regarded by filmmakers, Lee was considered a leading actress of the next generation of Chungmuro. Renowned for her emotional depth, versatile acting range and distinctively mysterious aura, she was one of the defining actresses of early-to-mid 2000s South Korean cinema and television. She died by suicide at age 24.

== Early life and beginnings ==
Lee was born in Gunsan, North Jeolla, South Korea, as the younger of two children. Raised in relative affluence, she engaged in various extracurricular activities from a young age, including dance, violin, swimming, bowling, and piano. Lee primarily studied music in her youth, without giving much thought to becoming an actress. Her childhood dream was to become a professional pianist, a path she pursued diligently for 14 years, starting from when she was five years old. She would later contribute a piano track to the soundtrack of the 2002 film Lovers' Concerto.

In July 1996, while attending Gunsan Yeonggwang Girls' High School, Lee entered the Sunkyung Smart Uniform Model Contest. Her path to the contest was largely accidental; while shopping for school uniforms with her mother, the store owner suggested she enter. According to Lee, she had little interest in modeling and entered only after her mother secretly submitted her application accompanied by a photograph. Lee passed the preliminary rounds and advanced to the finals. Expecting only to attend as a spectator to see invited celebrities, she was surprised to win the Silver Prize. Notable fellow contestants include future actress Song Hye-kyo and Ahn Mi-jung (later of the hip-hop group O-24). Shortly after winning, Lee appeared in her first television commercial for Smart Uniforms in late 1996.

"I went into the competition with absolutely no expectations and felt completely relaxed. About 2,500 people applied, 50 made it to the finals, and they were choosing seven winners. They asked me to introduce myself, so I did. Then they told me to dance, so I danced. After that, I was backstage watching the singers perform. Thinking it was time to go home, I had already taken off the sash I was wearing when suddenly I heard them call my name. I walked up looking completely bewildered, and received my award. I won the Silver Prize, and the person who won the Gold Prize was Hye-kyo—Song Hye-kyo. After that, I filmed a school uniform commercial and went back to Gunsan, where I returned to studying and playing the piano. Then I received an offer to appear in a drama. Little by little, I found myself getting deeper into acting, and before I knew it, here I am."

== Career ==
=== 1997–1999: Early television roles and breakthrough ===
After finding work as a model, Lee officially made her debut in January 1997 on the KBS comedy show Comedy Outlook (코미디 전망대). Later that year, she entered standard broadcast drama acting with the KBS2 TV youth series Start, as class president Jeong Nam-young. Unlike her later serious image, her early television appearances featured her playing lively, typical high school characters. In August 1998, she appeared briefly in the SBS horror anthology Horror Special 8-Part Series (납량특선 8부작) in the two episodes of One Day Suddenly (어느날 갑자기), followed by a notable supporting performance in the SBS drama White Nights 3.98 (백야 3.98), playing the younger counterpart of Shim Eun-ha's character.

Her public breakthrough came in 1999 with the hit SBS drama KAIST by famed screenwriter Song Ji-na. The series followed the lives of engineering students at the prestigious university. Lee played Gu Ji-won, a cold, pragmatic student who balances her harsh exterior with deep loyalty to her team. Although it became one of her most recognizable early performances, Lee later admitted in interviews that she initially disliked playing Ji-won due to the sharp contrast between the character's personality and her own. Ji-won's detached demeanor and sharp wit earned her the nickname "Ice Princess" and the image continued to be associated with Lee even after her successful transition to film. The series became a commercial success and her character's immense popularity significantly raised Lee's public profile. Lee, who was still in high school when filming started, was the youngest member of the main cast despite portraying a senior university student. Following KAIST, she was frequently cast in roles depicting women older than her actual age. This trend stemmed from a level of artistic maturity and compelling screen presence rarely seen among peers in her generation. Her nuanced performances at a young age earned her widespread acclaim and established her public image as a mature, sophisticated actress.

=== 1999–2002: Rise in Korean cinema and critical acclaim ===
While filming KAIST, Lee transitioned to film. Her film debut was in 1999, when she played the younger sister Se-hwa in Park Jong-won's award-winning feature Rainbow Trout. This proved to be a turning point in her career, leading her to pursue acting professionally. Until then, Lee had intended to attend a music conservatory and become a concert pianist. After initially rejecting the role six months prior citing difficulties in balancing acting with her studies, Lee accepted upon the director's offer while expressing her enthusiasm in working alongside actress Kang Soo-yeon. She managed a demanding schedule during the early stages of production, traveling between the Rainbow Trout set in Gangwon, her work on KAIST in Daejeon, and her final year of high school in Gunsan, while continuing her piano practice at a music academy. Ultimately, this prompted her to pivot her academic focus from music to acting. She later enrolled in the Department of Theatre and Film at Dankook University. Lee earned praise for holding her own alongside veteran actors.

"When I played Shim Eun-ha sunbaenim’s younger self in White Nights 3.98, I thought it would simply become a memory from my high school years. I was planning to major in piano and attend a music college. But at some point while working on KAIST and Rainbow Trout, I came to think that acting was the path meant for me.”

Her performance in Rainbow Trout caught the attention of acclaimed director Hong Sang-soo, who cast her as the lead in his art house feature Virgin Stripped Bare by Her Bachelors [Oh! Soo-jung] (2000). The english title references an artwork by Marcel Duchamp. Lee delivered one of the most memorable performances in all of Hong's films and in what was South Korea's first black-and-white film in 30 years. She portrayed the titular Soo-jung, a TV screenwriter in her late twenties—significantly older than Lee herself. Caught between two men, Soo-jung presents an image that is at once innocent and subtly calculating, and Lee was praised for her rare composure as a newcomer and capturing the character's emotional ambiguity. Anthony Leong writes that she "delivers the standout performance" and that her charisma is one of the highlights of the film. The film received widespread critical acclaim. It won Best Film at the Busan Film Critics Association, received the Special Jury Prize at the Tokyo International Film Festival, and won Best Screenplay at the 45th Asia-Pacific Film Festival. It also served as the opening film of the inaugural Jeonju International Film Festival. Lee attended the 2000 Cannes Film Festival, where the film was selected for the Un Certain Regard. Her performance also earned her the Best New Actress award at the 38th Grand Bell Awards in 2001.

In film, Lee quickly established herself as a leading actress. In late 2000 she was cast in director Kim Dae-sung's directorial debut, the hit film Bungee Jumping of Their Own (2001) where she starred opposite actor Lee Byung-hun. Her portrayal of In Tae-hee—an art student whose tragic destiny spans lifetimes—solidified her as a Chungmuro leading lady. Critics regarded her portrayal of the wistful yet poignant first love as central to the emotional impact of the story. The film won the Audience Award at the 10th Hamburg Film Festival in the feature debut competition. Bungee Jumping of Their Own remains one of the defining romantic films in Korean cinema and has spawned multiple adaptations even decades after its release. Its enduring popularity has kept it in the public consciousness, leading to theatrical re-releases in 2017 and 2021. The sunset waltz scene between Lee and Lee Byung-hun is considered one of the most iconic moments in Korean romance film history. Lee later described Tae-hee as the role to which she felt the strongest personal attachment among all of her film performances.

In 2002, Lee starred alongside Cha Tae-hyun and Son Ye-jin in the melodrama Lovers' Concerto. Playing the outgoing, tomboyish Kim Kyung-hee, Lee was able to portray a persona closer to her real-life self. Having frequently expressed a desire to move away from the cold, quiet, and mature image associated with her performances following KAIST, Lee regarded Lovers' Concerto as a successful departure from the serious characters she had previously been known for. Lee also noted that the film marked her first opportunity to work comfortably with co-stars of a similar age, after previously appearing primarily opposite older actors. Lively and warm-hearted Kyung-hee later displays a more tragic side, and Lee's performance was positively received by critics. She personally performed the film's main theme "Kyung-hee's Theme" on the piano after production staff watched her play on set and suggested she record the track herself. The film was a commercial success, and earned Lee her first nomination for Best Actress at the 23rd Blue Dragon Film Awards.

=== 2003–2004: Taegukgi, Phoenix, and The Scarlet Letter ===
In 2003, Lee was cast in the melodrama film Garden of Heaven alongside Ahn Jae-wook in what would be Ahn's return to the big screen after five years. This also marked Lee's second collaboration with film director and screenwriter Lee Han, after Lovers' Concerto (2002). Later that year, Lee was cast alongside Han Suk-kyu in the thriller film Salt Doll (소금인형). However, internal conflicts between the production crew and director led to severe production delays. In early 2004, investor CJ Entertainment halted production indefinitely after only about 20% of the movie had been shot, leaving it permanently unreleased. During this period, Lee starred in Au Revoir, UFO (2004) as a visually impaired woman. She reportedly prepared for the role by observing the daily lives of blind individuals and practicing everyday tasks with her eyes closed. Her performance received praise, though the film itself will be overshadowed by her later works.

Despite the suspension of Salt Doll, 2004 proved to be a milestone year for Lee. During the same period, Lee was cast as Kim Young-shin, the fiancée of Lee Jin-tae (played by Jang Dong-gun), in Kang Je-gyu's record-breaking Korean War film Taegukgi: The Brotherhood of War (2004). Retrospectives noted that Taegukgi is a film where Lee demonstrated that her range extended to period pieces through her portrayal of the tragic heroine. Filmed and produced in 2003—50 years since the end of the Korean War—it premiered in February 2004. The blockbuster became the highest-grossing domestic film of its time and the first Korean film to surpass over 10 million admissions at the South Korean box office, making Lee the first South Korean lead actress to achieve this milestone. In 2021, Taegukgi and Bungee Jumping of Their Own were among the eight landmark films selected by CGV in their Signature-K lineup, a series aimed to preserve and reintroduce South Korean cinematic history by digitally remastering a short list of important masterpieces to 4K resolution.

The suspension of Salt Doll also opened the opportunity for Lee to return to television in MBC's Phoenix (2004). Preferring film over television, she repeatedly turned down drama roles and took a prolonged break from the small screen. Initially declining the role due to her film commitments, Lee eventually accepted after finding herself available to film a drama. She returned to television after four years and starred in her first drama lead role alongside Lee Seo-jin and Eric Mun. She portrayed Lee Ji-eun, a spoiled heiress whose privileged life collapses before she grows into a resilient adult. Phoenix became one of the most successful dramas of the year, reaching a peak nationwide viewership of 31.7% and spawning a dedicated fanbase. Lee delivered arguably her finest performance on television and received universal acclaim in her role. Critics particularly praised her ability to portray the dynamic of youthful impulsiveness and later emotional maturity of her character, navigating a ten-year character arc with profound emotional range. Director Oh Kyung-hoon noted that while Lee naturally commanded a calm atmosphere, she could effortlessly portay lively, energetic characters and possessed an intellectual screen presence. Her performance earned her the Top Excellence Award (Actress) at the 2004 MBC Drama Awards. The drama significantly expanded her popularity throughout East Asia and established her as one of Korea's leading television actresses.

While completing Phoenix, Lee began production on The Scarlet Letter (2004). Directed by Daniel H. Byun, the erotic thriller is to be her last feature. She was cast as Choi Ga-hee, a jazz singer involved in an extramarital affair with a detective, in a role that drew substantial media attention. The role represented one of the most psychologically demanding performances of her career and departed significantly from her previous sympathetic characters. The film screened as the Closing Film at the 2004 Busan International Film Festival. Lee's performance as the alluring Ga-hee remains one of the most intensely discussed acting feats in modern South Korean cinema, partly due to the unforeseen tragedy that followed. While the film itself received mixed structural reviews, Lee's magnetic presence and ability to balance calculating sensuality with shattering, vulnerable despair were universally heralded by local and international critics alike. In a review, Variety highlighted her screen presence, noting that she completely overshadowed the rest of the female cast and provided a genuine "noirish stride" to the film. Co-star and industry senior Han Suk-kyu praised her range and versatility, stating that Lee had reached a point in her career where she could "paint virtually any picture she wanted" in comparison to her peers. A skilled piano player in real life, Lee performed her own vocals for the film's jazz sequences. She was nominated for Best Actress at the 25th Blue Dragon Film Awards, 41st Baeksang Arts Awards, and 42nd Grand Bell Awards for her stellar performance.

"[The most difficult scene] is definitely the trunk scene. It was so difficult that I wondered if it was even okay for a person to suffer this much; I felt exactly like I wanted to die. It will probably remain the most memorable scene out of my entire filmography so far—and likely throughout the rest of my career."

==== Final engagements ====
In October 2004, Lee participated in a Vogue photoshoot alongside Hong Kong actor Tony Leung. The collaboration was arranged in connection with the 9th Busan International Film Festival, where Leung and Lee starred in the opening and closing films, respectively. Leung praised Lee's performance in Virgin Stripped Bare by Her Bachelors, highlighting her charm and subtlety. On-set staff also noted Lee's fluency in English during her interactions with Leung. In December 2004, Lee attended the Beijing Korean Film Festival, hosted jointly by China's Overseas Film Promotion Center and the Korean Film Council. Specially invited by the organizing committee, she represented South Korean cinema through media interviews, local press conferences and television appearances. Lovers' Concerto (2002) premiered during the festival, further expanding her profile in China following the success of Phoenix. Later that month, Lee was invited to serve as a jury member in the 16th Yubari International Film Festival to be held in Japan in February 2005, after impressing festival officials with her performance in The Scarlet Letter. However, she declined the offer, stating that she lacked the experience and seniority required to evaluate works.

"I'm called a new generation star, but I don't want to be the kind of person who achieves instant fame and then is quickly forgotten. I want to learn step-by-step how to become a good actress, and gradually work my way up. To become an actress takes more time."

== Personal life ==
During her high school years, faculty members described Lee as an exemplary student who maintained regular attendance despite her early entertainment activities. She played the piano and performed prominently in her school's historic Yeonggwang Missionary Choir, participating in regional events and military base performances.

Lee completed her primary and secondary education in her hometown before relocating to Seoul. She balanced her acting career with her studies, enrolling in the Department of Theatre and Film at Dankook University. She officially graduated with her bachelor's degree on February 18, 2005. Outside of her professional life, her hobbies centered largely around music, film, books, and sports; she was an avid skier, a skill listed as one of her specialties, and regularly enjoyed water sports in the summer and snowboarding in the winter.

In January 2004, Lee appeared in KBS2's Vitamin, where polysomnography testing revealed her susceptibility to early-stage depression linked to poor sleep quality. Originally broadcast as a standard television health-check segment, it was widely revisited by media and fans as an overlooked early indication of her mental health struggles prior to filming her final project. Interviews from 2004 perfunctorily mentioned her sleeping only 2-3 hours a day due to her gruelling schedule while filming Phoenix.

Due to her deteriorating health, her mother and older brother moved into her Bundang apartment. They remained with her until her passing, after which investigators recovered final letters expressing deep remorse and affection for her family. Lee's inner circle was reportedly aware of her condition, and how she "struggled with all her might" to overcome it.

A devout Christian during her lifetime, Lee regularly attended Hyundai Church in Samseong-dong, Seoul.

== Death and subsequent tributes ==
On February 22, 2005, days after her graduation from Dankook University, Lee hanged herself at her apartment in Bundang. Investigation ruled severe depression as the cause. She was twenty-four years old. Her family attributed her mental decline and insomnia to the psychological toll of filming The Scarlet Letter, a role she reportedly had difficulty detaching from. Police stated that Lee had been talking with her older brother and mother, with whom she lived, until 6 am before going into her room. When her brother became concerned after there was no sign of her even after 1 pm, he entered her room and found his younger sister lifeless.

It was later disclosed that she visited Seoul National University Bundang Hospital on January 24, 2005, seeking treatment for severe insomnia, loss of appetite, and impaired memory and concentration. Lee was formally diagnosed with depression on February 3 and received psychiatric treatment. Doctors recommended hospitalization for further testing, but she declined and missed her follow-up appointment.

She left a note, in which she wrote, "Mom, I am sorry and I love you." A separate note said, "Even though I live, I'm not really alive. I didn't want to resent anyone... I have no emotions… because I’m not myself anymore." Undated writings found in her room detailed her feelings of being trapped and struggle with chronic insomnia: "My head feels like it's going to split open too... If only I could sleep deeply..." She also outlined three final wishes: to recover from her unexplained pain, to be remembered as a good actress, and for her family to stay healthy.

The news of her death prompted a massive outpouring of grief from fellow actors, filmmakers, and fans. Analysts attributed the intensity of the public's shock and grief to Lee's professional reputation, noting that she was regarded as a highly promising young talent who had maintained a positive public image devoid of industry controversies. Adding to the shock was its unexpected timing; Lee was coming off arguably her most successful year. She was reviewing potential domestic and international projects, was seemingly upbeat on her graduation four days prior, had signed lucrative endorsement deals over the past few weeks, and was set to begin work on a feature film in the spring and a television series later in the year.

Lee was cremated and interred in a dedicated Christian columbarium niche at Chungah Memorial Park in Goyang. Hundreds of her fellow actors and entertainers attended her funeral. Moon Geun-young delivered the eulogy, vocalist Bada sang "You Were Born to be Loved", and friends spoke in her memory.

Her friends and colleagues have held memorials for Lee every year since her death. The 2007 event was marked by a music CD released in her name, featuring remastered versions of her cover performance of The Corrs' "Only When I Sleep" from The Scarlet Letter, as well as tribute performances by her friends in the entertainment industry. Namoo Actors partnered with CGV Arthouse for the 10th anniversary event in 2015 which featured free public screenings of her films and an invitation-only screening for fan club members and close acquaintances in the film industry.

=== Aftermath ===
Because high-profile celebrity suicides were virtually unprecedented at the time, South Korean media outlets engaged in intense, graphic reporting on the details of her death. This extensive coverage was followed by a documented surge in copycat suicides. A study published in the Journal of Affective Disorders confirmed an estimated 331 excess deaths during the four weeks following her death, heavily concentrated among young women of similar demographics. A significant portion of these deaths utilized similar methods as Lee, showing a direct link to the detailed media reporting. Lee’s passing is also recognized as a catalyst for the country's first major public discourse on the deep-seated stigma surrounding mental illness. As the first major celebrity suicide in modern Korean history, it altered the public perception of the entertainment industry and exposed the high-pressure environments endured by public figures.

== Critical re-evaluation and legacy ==
Although initial media reports heavily linked Lee's mental health struggles to her final role in The Scarlet Letter, subsequent analyses and members of the South Korean film community have largely rejected the sensationalized framing. Instead, contemporary critics and industry peers view her final performance as a testament to her uncompromising artistic dedication. As one of the industry's most prominent actresses at the time of her death shortly after turning 24, film retrospectives frequently characterized her career as one of unfulfilled artistic potential—an acting trajectory cut short at its peak—while noting that her existing body of work secured an enduring legacy within modern Korean entertainment. Critics and film historians frequently highlighted her emotional subtlety, naturalistic performance style, and ability to portray psychologically complex characters at a young age. Today, Lee is widely remembered as one of the most naturally gifted and versatile acting talents of her generation.

== Filmography ==
=== Film ===
Year	English Title	Hangul	Romanization	Role	Notes
1999	Rainbow Trout	송어	Song-eo	Se-hwa	
2000	Yeca	예카	Yeka		Internet short film
2000	Virgin Stripped Bare by Her Bachelors	오! 수정	Oh! Soo-jung	Yang Soo-jung	First lead role
2000	Bloody Beach	해변으로 가다	Haebyeoneuro gada	PC 통신하는 여자	Cameo appearance
2001	Bungee Jumping of Their Own	번지 점프를 하다	Beonjijeompeureul hada	In Tae-hee	
2001	Ahmijimong	아미지몽	Ahmijimong	Ah-mi	Internet short film
2002	Lovers' Concerto	연애소설	Yeonae soseol	Kim Kyung-hee	
2002	Unborn But Forgotten	하얀방	Hayanbang	Han Su-jin	
2003	Garden of Heaven	하늘정원	Haneul jeongwon	Kim Young-ju	
2004	Au Revoir, UFO	안녕! 유에프오	Annyeong UFO	Choi Kyeong-woo	
2004	Taegukgi	태극기 휘날리며	Taegukgi Hwinalrimyeo	Kim Young-shin	
2004	The Scarlet Letter	주홍글씨	Juhong geulshi	Choi Ga-hee	

=== Television series ===
Year	English Title	Hangul	Romanization	Role	Notes
1997	Start	스타트		Jeong Nam-young	
1998	Horror Special 8-Part Series	납량특선 8부작		Park Seong-ju	Appeared in episodes 1 and 2
1998	White Nights 3.98	백야 3.98	Baekya 3.98	young Anastasia	
1999	KAIST	카이스트	Kaiseuteu	Gu Ji-won	Ensemble cast
2000	Look Back in Anger	성난 얼굴로 돌아보라	Seongnan Eolgulro Dorabora	Jeong Su-jin	
2004	Phoenix	불새	Bulsae	Lee Ji-eun	First lead role

=== Music video appearances ===
Year	Song title	Hangul	Artist
1998	"Even After 10 Years"	십년이 지나도	Park Jin-young
1999	"Sad Gift"	슬픈 선물	Kim Jang-hoon
2000	"Desire"	소망	Joo Young-hoon
2000	"Late Regrets"	늦은 후회	BoBo
2001	"Tears Shed at the Edge of the Sky"	하늘 끝에서 흘린 눈물	Juniper
2004	"You Are Heartbreaking"	그대는 눈물겹다	M.C The Max
2004	"I Was Thankful..."	고마웠다고...	Tim

== Discography ==
=== Singles ===
Year	Title	Hangul	Notes
2001	"End Title: Oh! You Are a Beautiful Woman (Variation)" - Narration	End Title 오 그대는 아름다운 여인 - 에 내레이션 참여	from Bungee Jumping of Their Own OST
2002	"Lovers' Concerto Main Theme: Piano performance"	연애소설 Main Theme: 피아노 연주	from Lovers' Concerto OST
2002	"Hi Ji-hwan, I'm Gyung-hee" - Narration	지환아 안녕 나 경희야 - 내레이션	from Lovers' Concerto OST
2004	"Only When I Sleep"	—N/a	from The Scarlet Letter OST
2007	"Lee Eun-ju: Only One"	이은주 Only One	Lee Eun-joo tribute album

== Awards and nominations ==
Year	Award	Category	Nominated work	Result
1996	Sunkyung Smart Student Uniform Model Contest	Silver Award	—N/a	Won
2000	21st Blue Dragon Film Awards	Best New Actress	Virgin Stripped Bare by Her Bachelors	Nominated
2001	38th Grand Bell Awards	Best New Actress	Virgin Stripped Bare by Her Bachelors	Won
2002	23rd Blue Dragon Film Awards	Best Actress	Lovers' Concerto	Nominated
2004	25th Blue Dragon Film Awards	Best Actress	The Scarlet Letter	Nominated
2004	MBC Drama Awards	Best Couple Award with Lee Seo-jin	Phoenix	Won
2004	MBC Drama Awards	Top Excellence Award, Actress	Phoenix	Won
2005	41st Baeksang Arts Awards	Best Actress (Film)	The Scarlet Letter	Nominated
2005	42nd Grand Bell Awards	Best Actress	The Scarlet Letter	Nominated
2005	Korea Broadcasting Awards	Person of the Year in Broadcasting (TV Actress category)	Phoenix	Nominated
2005	8th Director's Cut Awards	Special Acting Award	—N/a	Won

== See also ==
- Suicide in South Korea
