= KAIST (TV series) =

1999–2000 South Korean TV series

- Hangul: 카이스트
- RR: Kaiseuteu
- MR: K'aisŭt'ŭ
- Genre: School drama
- Written by: Song Ji-na; Kim Nam-hee; Kim Yun-jeong
- Directed by: Joo Byung-dae
- Starring: Lee Min-woo; Kim Jung-hyun; Lee Eun-ju; Chae Rim; Kang Sung-yeon; Jung Sung-hwa
- Country of origin: South Korea
- No. of seasons: 2
- No. of episodes: 81; Season 1: Episodes 1–67; Season 2: Episodes 68–81

Original release
- Network: SBS TV
- Release: January 24, 1999 – October 8, 2000

KAIST (Korean: 카이스트, RR: Kaiseuteu) is a South Korean television series produced by SBS that aired from January 24, 1999 to October 8, 2000. It featured an ensemble cast of actors and actresses including Lee Min-woo, Kim Jung-hyun, Lee Eun-ju, Chae Rim, Kang Sung-yeon, and Jung Sung-hwa. Set at the Korea Advanced Institute of Science and Technology (KAIST), the drama is notable for its depiction of student life at a specialized science and engineering institution.

== Production and reception ==
The series was written by Song Ji-na, who previously authored popular television dramas including Eyes of Dawn (1991) and Sandglass (1995). Its premiere received significant public attention, and the show's broadcast is credited with increasing public familiarity with the institute during the late 1990s. The series popularized a romanticized image of engineering students, highlighting late-night study sessions, complex laboratory experiments, and hands-on technical projects.

While the show was largely filmed on location at the KAIST campus to maintain an authentic atmosphere, several key interiors were shot on constructed studio sets rather than in actual university facilities. These set locations included student dormitories, the campus dining facility, and faculty offices. The studio-built dormitories appeared more modern and spacious than real-life campus housing. Nevertheless, there was a boost of incoming students who had matriculated partly due to the drama.

The series consists of two official seasons, each focusing on a distinct student organization:

- Season 1: Centers on the activities of the robotics club Mister.
- Season 2: Focuses on the aviation club Icarus.

=== Season 1 ===
The first season, centered on the university's robot soccer club, achieved major commercial and ratings success. The broadcast spawned a companion book, titled Song Ji-na's KAIST, and two soundtrack albums. The main cast recorded the show's theme songs:

- "A World Drawn by the Heart" (마음으로 그리는 세상) – Early-season theme
- "The Promise in My Heart" (내 마음의 약속) – Late-season theme

Both tracks gained popular traction, leading to live cast performances on the SBS music program Inkigayo and widespread adoption as choral arrangements.

Season 1 ran for more than four times the duration of the second season and featured several key cast and narrative transitions.

=== Season 2 ===
In contrast to its predecessor, the second season experienced low viewership and a shorter broadcast run. It did not receive an official soundtrack release, and official documentation regarding its production remains limited. Due to the disparity in popularity between the two runs, retro-analysis and media coverage of KAIST focus predominantly on the first season, with the late-season them "The Promise in My Heart" frequently misattributed as the theme for Season 2.

== Cast and notable appearances ==
The series served as an early career platform for numerous actors who later achieved prominence in the South Korean entertainment industry. Among those who appeared in main, supporting, minor, or guest roles during the early stages of their careers were:

- Lee Eun-ju
- Ji-sung
- Kim Joo-hyuk
- Lee Kyu-han
- Yoon Ji-min
- Lee Byung-hun
- Yeon Jung-hoon
- Kim Myung-min
- Lee Na-young
- Choo Ja-hyun
- Jung Sung-hwa

== Season 1 characters ==
=== Department of Electrical Engineering ===
==== Faculty ====
- Professor Lee Hee-jung (portrayed by Lee Hwi-hyang) – A professor of engineering who leads the Intelligent Control Laboratory. She firmly maintains that perseverance, rather than innate talent, is the most critical trait for a scientist.

==== Graduate students and researchers ====
- Kim Jung-tae (portrayed by Kim Jung-hyun) – 4th Year Undergraduate → 1st Year Master's Student. A brilliant student, he initially withdrew from the institute after a rival classmate committed suicide following an academic dispute. He later returns to honor his friend's memory.
- Lee Hae-sung (portrayed by Lee Na-young) – 1st Year Master's Student. An alumnus of another university who was recruited to the Intelligent Control Laboratory. First introduced in Episode 53.
- Jung Myeong-hwan (portrayed by Kim Joo-hyuk) – Doctoral Student. The highly capable head researcher of the Intelligent Control Laboratory who holds the deep trust of Professor Lee. Stern with junior researchers, he originally harbored aspirations of becoming a poet.
- Jung Man-soo (portrayed by Jung Sung-hwa) – 1st Year → 2nd Year Master's Student. A master's student in the Intelligent Control Laboratory. Though prone to mistakes and overconfident, he was accepted into the research group due to his relentless tenacity.
- Ryu Joong-hee (portrayed by Ryu Joong-hee) – Doctoral Student. A senior researcher in the Intelligent Control Laboratory. The role was portrayed by an actual KAIST student whose initial one-time cameo led to a recurring main cast role.

==== Undergraduate students ====
- Lee Min-jae (portrayed by Lee Min-woo) – 4th Year → 5th Year Undergraduate (Repeating Year). President of the robotics club Mister. He struggles with a "superman complex" stemming from the success of his father and brothers. He handles setbacks in isolation rather than seeking help.
- Choi Jae-myung (portrayed by Jung Min) – 2nd Year Undergraduate. A member of the Mister robotics club, he is also a skilled finswimmer who competes in national events. He departed the series after Episode 30.

=== Department of Computer Science ===
==== Faculty ====
- Professor Park Ki-hoon (portrayed by Ahn Jung-hoon) – A professor in the Artificial Intelligence Laboratory with a childlike disposition, contrasting sharply with Professor Lee's strict teaching style. Despite his casual demeanor, he holds an advanced degree from MIT. The character was modeled after real-life KAIST computer science professor Lee Kwang-hyung, who later became the university's president in February 2021.

==== Graduate students and researchers ====
- Gu Ji-won (portrayed by Lee Eun-ju) – 4th Year Undergraduate → 1st Year Master's Student. A high-achieving student driven by financial hardship to maintain her scholarship. Though pragmatic, she strictly adheres to principles of fairness. Highly skilled in various extracurricular pursuits, she becomes a central romantic interest for Kim Jung-tae and is the series' most popular character.
- Shin Nam-hee (portrayed by Shin Eun-jung) – Doctoral Student. The head researcher in Professor Park's lab who manages the administrative and operational duties neglected by her absentminded supervisor. She frequently fending off romantic advances from fellow student Jung Man-soo.
- Lee Kyu-han (portrayed by Lee Kyu-han) – 1st Year Master's Student. Introduced in the latter half of Season 1 alongside Lee Hae-sung. Highly competitive and intense in his pursuits, he is occasionally willing to bend rules to achieve results.

==== Undergraduate students ====
- Park Chae-young (portrayed by Chae Rim) – 4th Year Undergraduate. A close childhood friend of Lee Min-jae. She departs the institute in Episodes 20–21 (written off the show following actress Chae Rim's casting in the MBC sitcom Jump).
- Jung Jin-soo (portrayed by Kim Jung-min) – 3rd Year Undergraduate. A student from a wealthy background who possesses a cold outer personality that hides a compassionate nature. Originally introduced as the leader of a rival robotics team, he later joins Mister before working in Professor Park's lab.
- Michael (portrayed by Michael) – A Korean-American transfer student who followed Professor Park from MIT to KAIST. An exceptionally gifted programmer, he joins the robotics club to handle software development while exhibiting a playful personality similar to his mentor.

=== Department of Mechanical Engineering ===
==== Faculty ====
- Professor Jung Kyung-sik (portrayed by Lee Won-jae) – A professor in the Mechanical Engineering Engine Laboratory. Known for his stern demeanor, he demonstrates a distinct approach toward his students, acting as a demanding mentor to the department's sole female student, Choo Ja-hyun.

==== Graduate students & researchers ====
- Choo Ja-hyun (portrayed by Choo Eun-ju) – 4th Year Undergraduate → 1st Year Master's Student. A tomboyish and passionate engineering student who possesses a deep fascination with automobiles and machinery. Introduced in Episode 22, her character reflected the contemporary stereotype of female students in predominantly male-dominated engineering disciplines.
- Yang Byung-seok (portrayed by Yeon Jung-hoon) – 4th Year Undergraduate → 1st Year Master's Student. A model student who regularly assists Ja-hyun with her mishaps. He was involved in a central romantic triangle alongside Ja-hyun and Da-wook prior to his departure from the series.
- Eun Dong-hyun (portrayed by Eun Ki-ho) – The head researcher of the Engine Laboratory who assumed an expanded role in the story following the departure of Yang Byung-seok's character.

=== Satellite Technology Research Center ===
==== Faculty and staff ====
- Professor Seo (portrayed by Baek Jong-hak) – A physics professor overseeing the Satellite Technology Research Center. Educated in the United States, he maintains a long-standing friendship with Professor Park and frequently tempers Park's eccentric impulses.
- Kim Seok-woo (portrayed by Kim Chan-woo) – The head researcher of the Satellite Technology Research Center and an early pioneer of the university's satellite research program. He remains in his doctoral studies due to his extensive dedication to research, using his experience to mentor juniors.

==== Students ====
- Min Kyung-jin (portrayed by Kang Sung-yeon) – 4th Year Undergraduate (Physics) → 1st Year Master's Student. Introduced following the departure of Park Chae-young as a romantic interest for Lee Min-jae upon her return from Stanford University. Known for her eccentric and detached demeanor, her primary hobby is human observation.

== Season 2 characters ==
The second season shifts focus to aviation club Icarus after the graduation of the first-generation cast members. The story maintained elements of academic realism, particularly in its portrayal of academic probation and academic dismissal processes.

=== Faculty and staff ===
- Aeronautical Engineering Professor (portrayed by Kim Chang-wan) – A cynical faculty member and academic advisor to Kim Min-hee who openly suggests that struggling students pursue alternative career paths.
- Department Chair (portrayed by Baek Il-seob) – A department head concerned by his students' absorption in campus environmental activism.
- Faculty Advisor (portrayed by Youn Yuh-jung) – Academic advisor to Ki Tae-hoon who offers quiet encouragement to students facing academic dismissal.

=== Students and club members ===
- Ki Tae-hoon (portrayed by Ki Tae-young) – A student admitted under a special invention track who faces expulsion following two consecutive academic probations. After identifying an engine flaw as the cause of a test flight crash in Episode 68, he collaborates with Kim Min-hee on experimental aircraft design.
- Kim Min-hee (portrayed by Kim Min-jung) – An ambitious student with a 2.3 GPA whose proposal for electric-powered aircraft is rejected by the elite aviation club Icarus. Seeking to prove her theories regarding engine failure during stall events, she constructs her first successful model aircraft with Tae-hoon's assistance.
- Kim Jung-wook (portrayed by Kim Wook) and Jin-hee (portrayed by Lee Ja-young) – Members of Icarus, an elite campus aviation club that restricts membership to students maintaining a GPA above 3.3 and a record of competitive awards in model aircraft design.
- Hong Soo-jin (portrayed by Hong Soo-hyun)
- Lee Jae-sung (portrayed by Lee Jae-hwang)
- Choi Da-eun (portrayed by Kim Ji-yeon)
- Hwa-kyung (portrayed by Kim Jae-in)
- Kim Han-yi (portrayed by Song Eun-young)
- Sang-chul (portrayed by Go Doo-ok)
- Hong Su-ri (portrayed by Hong Kyung-in)
