= Lee Hyun-woo =

Lee Hyun-woo (Korean: 이현우) may refer to:

- Lee Hyun-woo (entertainer, born 1966), South Korean actor and singer
- Lee Hyun-woo (actor, born 1993), South Korean actor and singer
