= All About Eve (South Korean TV series) =

South Korean TV series

- Hangul: 이브의 모든것
- RR: Ibeuui modeungeot
- MR: Ibŭŭi modŭn'gŏt
- Genre: Drama; Romance
- Developed by: Kim Se-young
- Written by: Park Ji-hyun; Oh Soo-yeon
- Directed by: Lee Jin-suk; Han Chul-soo
- Starring: Jang Dong-gun; Chae Rim; Han Jae-suk; Kim So-yeon
- Opening theme: "True Love" by Fin.K.L
- Country of origin: South Korea
- Original language: Korean
- No. of episodes: 20

Production
- Producer: Kang Byung-moon
- Camera setup: Multi-camera
- Running time: 60 minutes
- Production company: MBC C&I

Original release
- Network: MBC TV
- Release: April 26 – July 6, 2000

Related
- All About Eve (Philippines); Fall In Love (China)

All About Eve (Korean: 이브의 모든것) is a 2000 South Korean television series starring Jang Dong-gun, Chae Rim, Han Jae-suk and Kim So-yeon. The series focuses on two beautiful, young TV news reporters competing for the top position at the network they work for. It aired on MBC from April 26 to July 6, 2000, on Wednesdays and Thursdays at 21:55 (KST) for 20 episodes.

Besides sharing a title and the premise of female rivalry, this drama has nothing to do with the 1950 film of the same name starring Bette Davis.

== Plot ==
Jin Sun-mi (Chae Rim) is a lovely college student who lives with her upper-middle-class widowed father. She has a happy childhood with her best friend Kim Woo-jin (Han Jae-suk). Life changes radically for Sun-mi when her father decides to support Heo Young-mi (Kim So-yeon), a beautiful girl the same age as Sun-mi.

Young-mi became an orphan when her father, an alcoholic who frequently abused her, died in an accident while working for Mr. Jin's (Sun-mi's father) construction company. Young-mi has grown up in poverty, but she is not a humble person. She's arrogant, greedy and full of resentment. She initially becomes friends with Sun-mi, but eventually envies her for all she is and has even Woo-jin's love.

Young-mi becomes Sun-mi's rival in every aspect of her life. First, Young-mi steals Woo-jin from Sun-mi, then tries to take over her job at a very important TV network as they both dream of being famous news anchorwomen. She finally turns her eyes on Sun-mi's new boyfriend, Hyung-chul (Jang Dong-gun), one of the network's top executives, whom Sun-mi met during a trip to London. However, Hyung-chul's love for Sun-mi is stronger than Young-mi's estimation. Meanwhile, Woo-jin suffers from a broken heart as Young-mi makes his life miserable and finally dumps him so she can chase Hyung-chul even though it hurts her just as much since she does not love him and is only after him for her career's sake.

The climax of the plot comes when a former lover of Young-mi appears and threatens to reveal her deepest secret should she not return to him: a dark past as a prostitute. Since the gangster did not succeed in his attempts, he decided to kill Young-mi. Woo-jin dies while saving her life. However, all of Young-mi's treachery is exposed. Losing everything and heartbroken because of Woo-jin's death, she attempts to commit suicide, but her efforts are frustrated when she is found unconscious by a group of nuns on the shore of the Han River. When Young-mi wakes up, she suffers from amnesia and has lost almost all memories of her past.

The drama ends with a happy reconciliation between Young-mi and Sun-mi, who cries beside Young-mi, forgiving her for the misunderstandings between them since they met. Finally, Hyung-chul swears eternal love and proposes to Sun-mi right in the middle of a street, asking her not to move to London.

== Cast ==
- Jang Dong-gun as Yoon Hyung-chul
- Chae Rim as Jin Sun-mi
- Han Jae-suk as Kim Woo-jin
- Kim So-yeon as Heo Young-mi
- Hyun Seok as Mr. Jin, Sun-mi's father
- Park Won-sook as Mrs. Song, Woo-jin's mother
- Park Chul as Kim Sun-dal
- Kim Jung-eun as Yoo Joo-hee
- Lee Geun-hee as Lee Kyung-hee
- Park Sook-chul as Shin Ki-dong
- Yoon Gi-won as Choi Jin-soo
- Kim Hyo-jin as Jo Cho-jae
- Ahn Jung-hoon as Ahn Joon-mo
- Choi Joon-yong as Bae In-soo
- Han In-soo as Chairman Yoon, Hyung-chul's father
- Lee Kyung-jin as Hyung-chul's mother
- Kyeon Mi-ri as Yoon Hyung-chul's stepmother

=== Cameo appearance ===
- Leeteuk as a moviegoer
- Song Il-kook as a field reporter (ep. 11)
- Lee Tae-ran as a celebrity attendee at a fashion show (ep. 12)
- Lee Eon-jeong as a model in the fashion show.

== Remake ==
The hit drama has had two remakes.

All About Eve aired in the Philippines on GMA Network in 2009, starring Iza Calzado, Sunshine Dizon, Mark Anthony Fernandez and Alfred Vargas.

Fall In Love (Chinese: 爱上女主播; pinyin: Ài Shàng Nǚ Zhǔ Bō; lit. 'Fall In Love With Anchor Beauty') aired in China on Zhejiang Satellite TV in 2010, starring Zhu Dan, Cheryl Yang, Wu Jian, and South Korean actor Jang Hyuk. Chae Rim made a cameo appearance as Jang Hyuk's ex-girlfriend.
