= Unborn but Forgotten =

Unborn But Forgotten
- Hangul: 하얀방
- RR: Hayanbang
- MR: Hayanbang
- Directed by: Im Chang-jae
- Written by: Han Hyun-geun
- Produced by: Yu Hee-suk
- Starring: Lee Eun-ju; Jung Joon-ho
- Cinematography: Park Hui-ju
- Edited by: Kyung Min-ho
- Music by: Kim Jeong-a
- Distributed by: CJ Entertainment
- Release date: November 15, 2002
- Running time: 95 minutes
- Country: South Korea
- Language: Korean
- Budget: $2 million
- Box office: US$1,155,954

Unborn But Forgotten (Korean: 하얀방; RR: Hayanbang; lit. 'White Room') is a 2002 South Korean film directed by Im Chang-jae. Due to its plot, the film has been compared to both The Ring and FeardotCom.

== Plot ==
TV producer Han Su-jin investigates a string of mysterious deaths involving pregnant women after they have visited a website. Out of curiosity Han visits the website; later she starts to have bizarre hallucinations, suggesting that her death may be imminent. Han hires a detective named Choi to help her solve the mystery.

== Cast ==
- Lee Eun-ju as Han Su-jin
- Jung Joon-ho as Lee Seok
- Kye Seong-yong
- Myeong Ji-yeon
- Kim Ki-hyeon
- Jo Seon-mook
- Kim Jae-rok
- Lee Kan-hee as Hospital director
- Kim Kyeong-ik

== Music ==
The song "Awen" written and performed by Irish duo RUA (Liz Madden and Gloria Mulhall) was used as the theme song for the main character. This song was taken from their first album RUA released by Celtic Collections.
