= Sung Hyun-ah =

South Korean actress (born 1975)

- Born: July 23, 1975 (age 51); South Korea
- Other name: A.One
- Occupation: Actress
- Years active: 1994–present
- Spouse: Heo Eun-gyo (2007–2010; divorced)

Korean name
- Hangul: 성현아
- Hanja: 成賢娥
- RR: Seong Hyeona
- MR: Sŏng Hyŏna

Sung Hyun-ah (Korean: 성현아; born July 23, 1975) is a South Korean actress and beauty pageant titleholder who placed 2nd runner-up at Miss Korea 1994.

== Biography ==
Sung Hyun-ah placed second runner-up (or third place) at the Miss Korea pageant in 1994. She was the country's representative at the 1994 Miss International pageant, where she was a semi-finalist and won Miss Photogenic.

Sung made her acting debut in Salut D'Amour, and continued to appear in TV dramas such as See and See Again (also known as Can't Take My Eyes Off You), Should My Tears Show, Hur Jun, One Day Suddenly, Bad Woman, Good Woman, Yi San, and Flames of Desire. She also released an EP in 2004 titled Turn It Up under the name A.One.

But Sung became best known for her strong, sexy roles in films such as Hong Sang-soo's Woman is the Future of Man, Kim Tae-eun's The Intimate, and Kim Ki-duk's Time. She also appeared in The Scarlet Letter and The Customer Is Always Right. In 2007 Sung won the Best Actress award from the Malaga International Fantastic Film Festival in Spain, for her role in the horror film Cello.

No stranger to controversy, Sung was caught for using the drug ecstasy in 2002, and previously published a book containing nude photographs of herself. In 2006, a dispute broke out between Sung and the producers of the movie The Intimate when she protested against their marketing strategy to emphasize only the nude scenes. Sung said, "I filmed the nude scenes to make a good movie. I can't bear to see that such scenes are being used as tools for promotion. I am not an actress who undresses and tumbles about for no reason." She declared that from then on, she would avoid nude scenes altogether.

She married businessman Heo Eun-gyo on December 9, 2007 at the Paradise Hotel in Busan. After she and Heo divorced in 2010, Sung remarried three months later and gave birth to a son in 2012.

In December 2013, Sung was indicted on charges of prostitution, for allegedly receiving ₩50 million from a businessman surnamed Chae with whom she met up three times for sexual intercourse in 2010. She countersued to prove her innocence. In August 2014, the court dismissed Sung's request for a full trial and ruled that she was guilty of prostitution; she was sentenced to a fine of ₩2 million (US$1,930). But, on February 18, 2016, the Supreme Court ruled that she was innocent of prostitution charges, overturning the lower court's decision.

== Filmography ==
=== Film ===
- Time (2006)
- The Customer Is Always Right (2006)
- The Intimate (2005)
- Cello (2005)
- The Scarlet Letter (2004)
- Woman is the Future of Man (2004)
- Live or Die (2003)
- Boss X-File (2002)
- Hallelujah (1997)

=== Television drama ===
- KBS TV Novel: "Through the Waves" (KBS, 2018)
- Flames of Desire (MBC, 2010–2011)
- Ja Myung Go (SBS, 2009)
- Lee San, Wind of the Palace (MBC, 2007–2008)
- Bad Woman, Good Woman (MBC, 2007)
- One Day Suddenly (SBS, 2006)
- Open Drama Man and Woman "I'm Mr. Heidi and Married" (SBS, 2001)
- Twins (KBS, 2001)
- Lipstick (iTV, 2001)
- MBC Best Theater "Train Heading to Kaikoura" (MBC, 2000)
- Because of You (MBC, 2000)
- Hur Jun (MBC, 1999–2000)
- Should My Tears Show (MBC, 1999)
- Crystal (SBS, 1999)
- Advocate (MBC, 1998)
- See and See Again (MBC, 1998–1999)
- Kim Chang-wan's Three Stories (KBS, 1998)
- Devotion (KBS, 1997)
- 70-Minute Dramas "A Man With a Bag" (SBS, 1997)
- 18 Years of Growing Up (SBS, 1996)
- Exploration of Man (SBS, 1996)
- LA Arirang (SBS, 1995–1996)
- MBC Best Theater "Adelaide" (MBC, 1995)
- Salut D'Amour (KBS2, 1994)

=== Variety show ===
- Scandal 2.0 (tvN, 2009)
- Catch-One's World of Film (Catch-One, 1999)
- 진상을 찾아라 (HBS, 1997)
- 세상체험, 온몸을 던져라 (SBS, 1997)
- 행운의 일요특급 (KBS, 1995)
- 명사 가요초대석 (MBC, 1995)

== Discography ==
Album information	Track listing
Turn It Up: EP; Artist: A.One; Released: September 24, 2004; Label: EMG Media/EMI	Track listing: 1. Intro; 2. Turn It Up; 3. Hush (Remix); 4. 어서; 5. What You Say; 6. 탐 7. Hush (Original Mix)

== Awards ==
- 2007 10th Malaga International Fantastic Film Festival: Best Actress (Cello)
- 1994 34th Miss International Pageant: Miss Photogenic
- 1994 38th Miss Korea Pageant: 2nd Runner-up
