= Phoenix (South Korean TV series) =

2004 South Korean television series

- Promotional poster
- Also known as: Firebird
- Hangul: 불새
- Hanja: 不塞
- RR: Bulsae
- MR: Pulsae
- Written by: Lee Yoo-jin
- Directed by: Oh Kyung-hoon
- Starring: Lee Eun-ju; Lee Seo-jin; Jung Hye-young; Eric Mun
- Country of origin: South Korea
- Original language: Korean
- No. of episodes: 26

Production
- Producer: Lee Eun-kyu
- Running time: 60 minutes
- Production companies: Chorokbaem Media; Diamond Ogilvy Group

Original release
- Network: Munhwa Broadcasting Corporation
- Release: April 5 – June 29, 2004

Phoenix (Korean: 불새; RR: Bulsae; lit. 'Firebird') is a 2004 drama/romance South Korean television series starring Lee Eun-ju, Lee Seo-jin, Jung Hye-young and Eric Mun. It aired on MBC from April 5 to June 29, 2004, on Mondays and Tuesdays at 21:55 for 26 episodes.

It was about a couple who fell in love, but couldn't be together. They meet years later and their fortunes are switched. In the end they have a serious talk and decide that it is finally "the right time" for them to be together again.

With average viewership ratings of 25.3% and a peak of 31.4%, Phoenix was among the top-rated Korean dramas that aired in 2004. All four lead actors received acting recognition at the 2004 MBC Drama Awards.

This is the last TV appearance of actress Lee Eun-ju.

== Synopsis ==
Jang Sae-hoon is a poor, intelligent and hardworking college student on scholarship with a part-time job at a gas station. Lee Ji-eun is a strong-willed and impulsive girl whose father is the CEO of a textile company. Ji-eun falls in love with and pursues Sae-hoon, despite her family's strong opposition and his own misgivings about their different backgrounds. For fear that her family will succeed in breaking them apart, Ji-eun purposely gets pregnant with Sae-hoon's child so that they would be allowed to get married. After the wedding, spoiled Ji-eun is ill-accustomed to Sae-hoon's shabby living conditions, causing constant fights between the young couple. Ji-eun later suffers a miscarriage, which further drives a wedge between them. After losing the baby, Ji-eun becomes depressed and angry; she still loves her husband but is unable to communicate her feelings. Despite Sae-hoon's efforts to win her back, she shuts him out and allows herself to be convinced by her parents to file for divorce. Heartbroken, Sae-hoon takes the opportunity to leave for the US on a study grant/scholarship so that he can forget her.

Upon hearing that Sae-hoon is planning to leave Korea, Ji-eun speeds to the airport to stop him. Her father drives close behind, hoping to intercept her. At a traffic stop during a red light, her father steps out of his car and tries to catch her attention, but a motorcyclist sideswipes him. Her father dies. Because of the fatal accident, Ji-eun never gets to the airport.

At her father's funeral service, a company executive informs Ji-eun that her father's company has been taken over by rival Seo-Rin Group. Ji-eun's family has lost everything, they have no assets, no money.

10 years later...

In a reversal of fortunes, Ji-eun is now the world-weary breadwinner of her family while Sae-hoon triumphantly returns to Korea as a highly paid executive of Seo-Rin Group. He is engaged to Yoon Mi-ran, a rich, beautiful woman who adores him. Mi-ran is in a wheelchair after being paralyzed waist-down in a car accident the year before which Sae-hoon blames himself for.

While attending a fancy dinner party, Sae-hoon is shocked and disturbed to see Ji-eun as one of the waitresses. At the same party, playboy and Seo-Rin Group heir apparent Seo Jung-min tries to pick up Ji-eun and becomes seriously intrigued after she repeatedly turns him down.

Unaware of the connection, Mi-ran invites her old high school friend Ji-eun to meet her fiancé Sae-hoon. Despite their shock and unease, the exes try to spare Mi-ran's feelings by pretending they'd just met. But Mi-ran eventually finds out the truth about their previous relationship and she becomes wracked by jealousy and insecurity. She had been undergoing months of physical therapy, and during a session, discovers that she can walk again. Afraid that Sae-hoon is still in love with his ex-wife and that he would leave her once he knows that she can walk, Mi-ran conceals the truth from him and lies that she is still crippled, helpless and totally dependent on him, thereby assuring that he's tied to her by the bonds of guilt.

Sae-hoon hires Ji-eun as his housemaid, initially for revenge, but finds he does not have the stomach for it. Instead he discovers the quietly proud, mature and capable woman the trials of life has molded her into and can't help but admire her. Feelings of impotent jealousy also rise to the surface at seeing her being wooed by Seo Jung-min.

In an echo of her single-minded pursuit of Sae-hoon years ago, this time she is the one being relentlessly pursued by Jung-min while she tries to keep him at arm's length because she knows that Jung-min's father would never approve of her as a future daughter-in-law since she is divorced and poor. But despite Ji-eun's objections (and her still-complicated feelings for Sae-hoon), Jung-min proves the depth of his feelings for her and she eventually gives in to her attraction and agrees to become his girlfriend. She grows to care for him and they are happy for a time, and their relationship weathers several storms including Jung-min bitterly finding out that she was married to Sae-hoon.

The more Sae-hoon continues to encounter Ji-eun at work (she is hired as a temp at Seo-Rin Group), the more he falls in love with her and realizes he never really got over her. Though he never acts on his feelings, Mi-ran senses them and manipulates him, Ji-eun and Jung-min. When Sae-hoon finally finds out that Mi-ran can walk and that she has been feeding him so many lies for so long, he breaks up with her for good. Mi-ran snaps and becomes increasingly obsessive and destructive.

It is later revealed that the so-called "accident" that took the life of Ji-eun's father was actually part of a setup masterminded by Jung-min's father. Mr. Seo had wanted to take over the Lee textile business at a very low price, so he arranged a hit-and-run accident that would cause Mr. Lee to stay in the hospital for a few days until the bidding ended (but Mr. Lee ended up dying from his wounds). Their relationship could not recover from such a blow, and Ji-eun breaks up with Jung-min. To save his father, Jung-min kidnaps Ji-eun to force Sae-hoon to give up proof of Mr. Seo's culpability in Mr. Lee's death. Sae-hoon surrenders the proof and Jung-min lets her go.

Angered by Sae-hoon's interference and personal investigation, Mr. Seo and Jung-min set up a trap that got Sae-hoon arrested on false charges. Witnessing Sae-hoon's arrest, Ji-eun visits Jung-min and begs him to clear Sae-hoon of the charges in exchange for her dropping her father's murder case. A politician who had been protecting Mr. Seo is summoned by the prosecution on bribery charges. Eventually, the investigation reaches Mr. Seo and he is arrested but dies in the hospital before he is convicted. Jung-min then leaves for the US to start over.

Mi-ran visits Sae-hoon, who has been left penniless due to this series of events. Mi-ran demands that he stay away from Ji-eun, offering to return all her shares in Sae-hoon's company. Sae-hoon snaps back and tells her to leave. Mi-ran makes the same offer to Ji-eun and after much deliberation, Ji-eun visits Mi-ran and begs her to save Sae-hoon. Seeing Ji-eun kneel before Mi-ran, Sae-hoon suppresses his rage and takes Ji-eun away. Watching the two of them, Mi-ran finally commits an irreversible act. After countless crazy and vicious acts, Mi-ran commits suicide by swallowing a whole bottle of sleeping pills then calling Sae-hoon and Ji-eun to her side. She dies in Sae-hoon's arms as Ji-eun tearfully looks at what her old friend has become.

Three years later...

Ji-eun is now a successful marketing brand manager, and Sae-hoon has built his own microchip company. They each go separately to Jeju island (where they first consummated their love), and reach the same spot at the same time. They have a serious talk and decide that it is finally "the right time" for them to be together again.

== Cast ==
=== Main characters ===
==== Lee Eun-ju as Lee Ji-eun ====
Lee Ji-eun is a beautiful daughter, born into a privilege and wealthy family. Her father is a successful CEO of a textile group and her mother is used to the riches of her luxurious world.

She comes home from Boston for the holidays and as usual, she goes around acting like a spoiled princess. One day, Sae-hoon suddenly comes into her life and she desperately falls for him. But naturally, her parents are not happy about poor orphaned Sae-hoon. Ji-eun doesn't give up and gets pregnant. She leaves her parents and her luxurious life behind and starts her life with Sae-hoon in a tiny room in a rundown neighborhood. But very soon, she wakes up to reality and starts to get tired of her life in destitution. As misery loves company, she has a miscarriage and realizes she can't die for love. She gives a point-blank "no" and leaves Sae-hoon. After their divorce, upon hearing that Sae-hoon is leaving Korea, she drives like crazy to the airport thinking it would be her last chance to get him back. But fate is cruel and takes her father away in a car accident when he follows her. With her father's sudden death and the fall of her family, hopeless Ji-eun picks up the phone and calls Sae-hoon who, without knowing her situation, coldly turns her down.

Ten years later as a 32-year-old divorcée, Ji-eun with a manic-depressive mother and a trouble-making sister, has now become the breadwinner of the family.

A new romantic interest, Jung-min, appears, and he is popular with many women. Ji-eun tries to put him out of her mind, but he keeps pursuing her. Then her ex-husband Sae-hoon appears in front of her, and they end up meeting as client and helper.

==== Lee Seo-jin as Jang Sae-hoon ====
He was raised by his father, and grew up building up great ambitions for success and fame. Then he lost his father to a car accident and started working as a part-time job at a gas station to make his living. His life is a difficult one indeed, but he's a natural born genius, attending Seoul National University and maintaining high academic standards his scholarship demanded. One day out of the blue, a girl comes storming into his life. Her name is Ji-eun, a girl of a completely different background and character from Sae-hoon's. Knowing just too well of his harsh reality and of what waits for them ahead, he pushes her away. Ji-eun however, is keen to get his heart, and in the end, they get married. But as he expected, their marriage life was not rosy-colored and Ji-eun soon leaves him.

After signing divorce papers, he gets on a plane heading for New York City and a "new life". After a series of all kinds of ups and downs, he accomplishes the "American Dream" and becomes a newly polished person, William Jang.

Ten years have passed and he returns to Korea. Maybe it's a twist of their fate...he finds himself standing in front of her once again. But this time, he has someone, Mi-ran beside him. What's even worse, Mi-ran and Ji-eun are friends who studied together in Boston. Ten years ago, he really had nothing to offer Ji-eun, but he loved her with all of his heart. Can he really let her go?

==== Jung Hye-young as Yoon Mi-ran ====
Daughter of a rich real estate agent, she grew up wealthy and has a carefree lifestyle, left to her own devices by her doting father. However, despite that she has always felt somewhat inferior to Ji-eun. Without knowing Sae-hoon was once married to Ji-eun, she gets to know Sae-hoon at one Christmas donation party. She also desperately falls for him and decides to make him hers, doing everything possible. She did manage to get Sae-hoon to be with her but this was due to a car accident. The accident left her unable to walk and getting around in a wheelchair. Feeling guilty and responsible for the accident, Sae-hoon decides to marry her. Things get more complicated when Mi-ran learns of Sae-hoon's ex-wife. She then becomes more obsessed with Sae-hoon in order not to lose him to her lifetime rival, Ji-eun. She even hides the fact that she can now walk again...

==== Eric Mun as Seo Jung-min ====
The "Prince Charming" of Seo-Rin Group, a huge conglomerate. As the heir to Seo-Rin, he seems to have everything — good looks, perfect manners, and a knack for both academics and athletics. He graduated with honors from a prestigious university in Boston. From the outside, he appears perfect. However, he was not spared from a twisted fate. He lost his twin brother in an accident that he feels responsible for. As a form of self-punishment, he lives the life of a debauchee, much to the consternation and fury of his father. Then, fate brings him to Ji-eun.

=== Supporting characters ===
- Park Geun-hyung as Seo Moon-soo, Jung-min's father
- Kim Bin-woo as Lee Young-eun, Ji-eun's younger sister
- Lee Yoo-jin as Nam Bok-ja, Ji-eun's friend
- Lee Kyung-jin as Jo Hyun-sook, Ji-eun's mother
- Kim Byung-se as Kim Ho-jin, Sae-hoon's upperclassman
- Han In-soo as Lee Sang-beom, Ji-eun's father
- Shim Yang-hong as Mi-ran's father
- Kim Boo-seon as Jung-min's stepmother
- Kim Dong-hyun as Yeo-jin
- Jeon Su-ji as Jeon-ah
- Yoon Sung-hoon as Mi-ran's chauffeur
- Yoon Yoo-sun as Dr. Ahn Ji-young, psychiatrist

== Music ==
The theme song was "Fate" by Lee Seung-chul.

== Awards ==
2004 MBC Drama Awards

- Top Excellence Award, Actor: Lee Seo-jin
- Top Excellence Award, Actress: Lee Eun-ju
- Excellence Award, Actress: Jung Hye-young
- Best New Actor: Eric Mun
- Popularity Award: Eric Mun
- Best Couple Award: Lee Seo-jin and Lee Eun-ju

== International broadcast ==
Phoenix was exported to ten Asian countries, including China and Japan, reaching the $1 million mark in distribution rights. Due to the popularity in Japan of Eric Mun's previous drama Super Rookie, Fuji TV's satellite affiliate BS Fuji aired Phoenix every Thursday at 8 p.m. beginning July 19, 2006.

Taiwan aired Phoenix in August 2004 on VideoLand TV, largely contributing to Lee Eun-ju's popularity in the country. Thailand aired Phoenix in 2005 on Channel 5, and in the Philippines, the drama was aired in 2006 on GMA-QTV.

== 2020 SBS reboot series ==
Phoenix 2020 would be rebooted by SBS as a 120-episode morning soap opera to air starting October 19, 2020. Produced by Samhwa Networks, it would again be written by screenwriter Lee Yoo-jin, and Hong Soo-ah would play the role of Lee Ji-eun. Lee Jae-woo and Seo Ha-joon would star as Jang Sae-hoon and Seo Jung-min, respectively.
