= Dal-ja's Spring =

2007 South Korean romantic comedy series

- Promotional poster
- Also known as: Dal-ja's Springtime; Spring of Dal-ja; My Dear Dal-ja; Dalja's Spring
- Hangul: 달자의 봄
- RR: Daljaui bom
- MR: Talchaŭi pom
- Genre: Romance; Comedy; Drama
- Written by: Kang Eun-kyung
- Directed by: Lee Jae-sang
- Starring: Chae Rim; Lee Min-ki; Lee Hyun-woo; Lee Hye-young; Gong Hyung-jin
- Composer: Ji Kyung-won
- Country of origin: South Korea
- Original language: Korean
- No. of episodes: 22

Production
- Producers: Kim Kyung Min; Lee Deok-geon
- Running time: 60 minutes
- Production company: Kim Jong-hak Production

Original release
- Network: Korean Broadcasting System
- Release: January 3 – March 15, 2007

Dal-ja's Spring (Korean: 달자의 봄) is a 2007 South Korean romantic comedy television series starring Chae Rim, Lee Min-ki, Lee Hyun-woo, Lee Hye-young and Gong Hyung-jin. It aired on KBS2 from January 3 to March 15, 2007, on Wednesdays and Thursdays at 21:55 for 22 episodes.

Chae Rim won a Top Excellence Award in Acting at the 2007 KBS Drama Awards.

== Plot ==
Oh Dal-ja is a managing director at a home shopping network. 33 years old and single, marriage is heavy on her mind, mostly due to societal and familial pressure. Although she has everything - a successful career, supportive friends, a loving family - she still dreams of the perfect romance and marriage. She falls for her flirty colleague Shin Se-do, but after he dumps her for Wee Seon-joo, the stylish host of the home shopping TV show, Dal-ja decides to seek revenge. Enter Kang Tae-bong, a guy 6 years younger with a mysterious past. For ₩3 million (approximately US$3,200), Tae-bong signs a dating contract with Dal-ja to pretend to be her boyfriend for three months. But then Dal-ja meets Uhm Ki-joong, seemingly the perfect man: rich, good-looking, intelligent, and courteous, but recently separated from his wife. For the first time in her life, Dal-ja finds herself in a love triangle.

Dal-ja's Spring comically and candidly deals with issues in Korean society, such as women dating younger men, the everyday social pressures encountered by single women over 30, and mothers juggling work and family.

== Cast ==
=== Main characters ===
- Chae Rim as Oh Dal-ja

33-year-old home shopping channel managing director. She's extremely good at her job, but is a disaster at her love life. Even though she's in her thirties and considered an "old maid," she's naive and inexperienced with men and still has girlish dreams of a grand romance. She initially hires a boyfriend by contract, Kang Tae-bong, to seek revenge on a cheating ex, but finds that she enjoys having him around.

- Lee Min-ki as Kang Tae-bong

27-year-old freelancer for a proxy dating agency. Dal-ja hires him as her pretend boyfriend, but he soon develops genuine feelings for her. He has a frank and outspoken personality, but beneath is a warm and nurturing nature. Seemingly a debt-ridden slacker, Tae-bong actually comes from a rich family, but he gave up his career as a lawyer, and dreams of becoming a chef.

- Lee Hyun-woo as Uhm Ki-joong

36-year-old successful businessman who heads an importing firm of foreign brand goods. He's the perfect catch on paper: smart, rich, polite, and cultured. But he hides a secret obsession with cleaning, and is recently separated from his wife. The more he encounters Dal-ja, the more he grows attracted to her.

- Lee Hye-young as Wee Seon-joo

33-year-old home shopping network show host. A former top model, she disappeared from the public eye when she married at 29, then returned three years later as a divorcee. Seon-joo is something of a diva, and constantly gets on Dal-ja's nerves. She is a master at the dating game, and with her charms and wiles, she can bring any man to heel, including Shin Se-do. But more importantly, Seon-joo always knows her self worth, which earns Dal-ja's grudging admiration. After a small glimpse into Seon-joo's vulnerability, the two women later form an unlikely friendship.

- Gong Hyung-jin as Shin Se-do

Home shopping network TV director. He and Dal-ja get along as colleagues, and thinking he's a nice guy, she develops a crush on him and begins dating him. But belying his average looks, Se-do is actually the office playboy, and he quickly dumps her when she tells him she's not quite ready for a sexual relationship. But Se-do gets his comeuppance when he falls in love for real with the equally commitment phobic Seon-joo.

=== Supporting characters ===
- Seo Young-hee as Jang Soo-jin, Tae-bong's ex-girlfriend
- Lee Kyung-jin as Jung Jung-ae, Dal-ja's mother
- Kim Young-ok as Lee Kkeut-soon, Dal-ja's grandmother
- Kil Yong-woo as Kang Soon-hong, Tae-bong's father
- Kwon Ki-sun as Son Young-shim, Tae-bong's mother
- Kim Na-woon as Go Soon-ae, Dal-ja's pregnant best friend and colleague
- Jang Young-nam as Ki-joong's ex-wife
- Yang Hee-kyung as Team leader Kang
- Kim Sung-kyum as Tae-bong's grandfather
- Oh Kyung-soo as Nam Dae-soo, department director
- Kim Jae-wook as Choon-ha, Tae-bong's friend working at Dongdaemun Market
- Seo Young as Hong Ji-hee
- Kim In-tae as Se-do's father
- Choi Eun-seo as Hee-yeon
- Lee Mi-so as Ki-joong's secretary

== Ratings ==
Episode #	Title	Nationwide	Seoul Area
1	Things That Drive Her Crazy	14.9% (6th)	14.6% (6th)
2	Can Love be Hired?	14.9% (9th)	15.4% (7th)
3	A Romantic Inquiry Through a Powerful, Fated Encounter	11.6% (12th)	11.6% (13th)
4	There Was a Prince, Indeed, However...	12.6% (11th)	13.1% (12th)
5	Her Stance on Handling an Unsuitable Relationship	16.7% (4th)	17.2% (4th)
6	The Show Must Go On!	16.7% (5th)	16.5% (6th)
7	We Need 2% Moisture in Our Hearts	18.3% (3rd)	18.0% (4th)
8	The Adverse Effect of Lack of Love on an Old Maid	18.1% (6th)	17.5% (6th)
9	The Weight of One Brick...	18.3% (5th)	17.9% (5th)
10	Sometimes... Remember That We Are Right Next to You!	19.0% (6th)	18.3% (4th)
11	The Rules for Action and Reaction in Dating	18.8% (4th)	18.7% (4th)
12	The Reason Why Our Romance Is Beautiful	19.8% (6th)	19.3% (6th)
13	Happy Valentine's Day to You!	17.3% (7th)	17.6% (6th)
14	It's O.K. Even If You're Not Superwoman!	19.1% (6th)	18.6% (8th)
15	Love Saturates My Heart Like a Spring Shower!	18.6% (5th)	18.4% (5th)
16	There Needs to be Loyalty in Love!	18.3% (7th)	17.7% (7th)
17	The Earnest Things That Need to be Thrown Away While in Love Part 1	16.9% (6th)	16.8% (6th)
18	The Earnest Things That Need to be Thrown Away While in Love Part 2	18.2% (7th)	18.1% (7th)
19	Living As A Man... That's the Way It Is	17.5% (7th)	17.5% (6th)
20	Living As A Woman... That's the Way It Is	16.5% (9th)	16.1% (10th)
21	People That Are Hopeless With Love	16.8% (8th)	16.8% (8th)
22	Spring Comes (Around) Again, Flowers Bloom Again	18.4% (6th)	17.9% (6th)
Average		17.1%	17.0%

Source: TNS Media Korea

== Soundtrack ==
1. 기적 같은 사랑 - Lee Kyung-hwa
2. Sweet Lover - Park Hye-kyung
3. To You Mine - Pearl's Day
4. 추억을 열다 - Soyeon
5. 내 손을 잡아줘 - K-Jun
6. 나쁜 사랑 - M.R.J (Kang Jae-hyuk)
7. 심장 - Eun-young
8. Impression
9. Ya-Ya-Ya
10. 추억을 열다 (Inst.)
11. Lively Breeze
12. Surprise
13. To You Mine (Funky Ver.)
14. Miracle (Orchestra Ver.)
15. 너에 기억
16. 기적 같은 사랑 (Original Ver.)

== Awards and nominations ==
Year	Award	Category	Recipient	Result
2007	21st KBS Drama Awards	Top Excellence Award, Actress	Chae Rim	Won
2007	21st KBS Drama Awards	Excellence Award, Actor in a Miniseries	Lee Min-ki	Nominated
2007	21st KBS Drama Awards	Best Supporting Actor	Gong Hyung-jin	Nominated
2007	21st KBS Drama Awards	Best Supporting Actress	Lee Hye-young	Nominated
