= Bad Woman, Good Woman =

- Promotional poster
- Also known as: The Good Woman and the Bad Woman; Good Wife, Bad Wife
- Genre: Romance; Drama
- Written by: Lee Hong-gu
- Directed by: Lee Dae-young; Lee Dae-yoon
- Starring: Choi Jin-sil; Lee Jae-ryong; Sung Hyun-ah; Jeon No-min
- Country of origin: South Korea
- Original language: Korean
- No. of episodes: 176

Production
- Producer: Choi Yi-seob
- Production locations: South Korea; Saipan

Original release
- Network: Munhwa Broadcasting Corporation
- Release: January 12 – July 30, 2006

Bad Woman, Good Woman (Korean: 나쁜 여자 착한 여자; RR: Nappeun yeoja chakhan yeoja) is a 2007 South Korean television series starring Choi Jin-sil, Lee Jae-ryong, Sung Hyun-ah, and Jeon No-min. It aired on Mondays to Fridays at 19:45 on MBC from January 1 to July 13, 2007 for 140 episodes.

The daily drama explores the true meaning of family and love, as a wife who considers herself a "good woman" agonizingly finds out about her husband's 6-year-long affair.

== Plot ==
Se-young is (Choi Jin-sil) is a devoted wife and mother who greatly values her family and home life. She loves her doctor husband Geon-woo (Lee Jae-ryong) very deeply, and affectionately takes care of her old mother-in-law who is afflicted with dementia, as well as her daughter whom she did not give birth to. But unbeknownst to her, for the past six years Geon-woo has been having an affair with his first love, Seo-kyung (Sung Hyun-ah), who herself is married to Tae-hyun (Jeon No-min). Things come to a head when Geon-woo and Seo-kyung take their families to Saipan for an international medical seminar. Se-young and Tae-hyun are looking forward to a second honeymoon with their respective spouses, not knowing that Geon-woo and Seo-kyung are secretly meeting for trysts. When Se-young discovers her husband's infidelity, her world goes to pieces.

== Cast ==
=== Main characters ===
- Choi Jin-sil as Lee Se-young
- Lee Jae-ryong as Song Geon-woo
- Sung Hyun-ah as Yoon Seo-kyung
- Jeon No-min as Kim Tae-hyun

=== Supporting characters ===
- Lee Hyo-choon as Lee Kyung-seon
- Kim Yong-rim as Mrs. Song
- Ha Seung-ri as Song Jin-ah
- Kim Ji-woo as Song Ji-woo
- Baek Il-seob as Kim Bong-dal
- Nam Yoon-jung as Choi Mal-ja
- Chae Jin-geon as Kim Tae-wook
- Lee Yoon-mi as Kim Tae-hee
- Lee Sang-gil as Kim Woo-ram
- Yoo Seo-jin as Lee So-young
- Kyung Joon as Han Sang-jin
- Shin Dong-mi as Jang Ji-seon
- Han In-soo as Seo-kyung's father
- Park Hye-won
- Lee Jin-sung
- Song Min-jung as nurse
- Shin Shin-ae Gwi-ok
- Kim Young-sun as Yeon Byeon-daek
