= Cello (film) =

- Directed by: Lee Woo-cheol
- Written by: Jeong Woo-cheol
- Produced by: Yun Hyo-seok; Kim Sang-chan; Jang Yong-seok
- Starring: Sung Hyun-ah; Park Da-an; Jeong Ho-bin
- Cinematography: Gwon Yeong-cheol
- Edited by: Kim Yong-su
- Music by: Lee Han-na
- Distributed by: Tube Entertainment
- Release date: August 18, 2005
- Running time: 94 minutes
- Country: South Korea
- Language: Korean

Cello (Korean: 첼로) is a 2005 South Korean horror film.

== Plot ==
Part-time professor and former cellist Mi-ju (Sung Hyun-ah) is invited to a homecoming concert by a talented student Kim Hae-young, sister of Tae-yeon, whom Mi-ju knows. On her way out, a former student accosts Mi-ju for giving her bad grades and promises revenge. Driving home, Mi-ju plays an unmarked cassette tape in her car, and hears a cello tune. She suddenly has a headache and loses control of her car, driving straight into a truck. She jolts awake from the apparent nightmare and takes out the tape.

At home, Mi-ju receives a taunting text message on her cell phone, seemingly from the former student, and hears voices calling out for her. Her family, consisting of her husband Jun-ki, her sister-in-law Kyeong-ran, and two daughters Yoon-jin and Yoon-hye, throws her a birthday party. Among her presents was a rare vinyl record from Kyeong-ran. Later, noticing Yoon-jin's interest, Mi-ju teaches her to play the cello. Jun-ki hires a new housekeeper named Ji-sook.

Leaving for work, Mi-ju find Sunny, the family dog, dead inside its kennel. In the parking garage, she is almost hit by a car. At home, Yoon-hye touches the cello, and Yoon-jin bites her. She comes to Kyeong-ran for comfort, only for her aunt to close the door on her. It appears Kyeong-ran's fiance recently broke up with her.

At night, Mi-ju continues to experience strange phenomena, like hallucinating Yoon-jin glaring at her, and hearing her family's voices calling. A ghost briefly taunts Kyeong-ran then pushes her to her death, her body ended up right outside Yoon-jin's window.

Checking Kyeong-ran's room, Jun-ki finds Mi-ju's college yearbook with Kim Tae-yeon's face cut out. Ji-sook finds the same unmarked cassette tape and later gives it to Yoon-jin.

At work, Mi-ju finds a dead bird in the locker. Enraged at the constant harassments, she confronts her former student and slaps her. She reports the harassment to the police, who are unable to act without direct evidence. On the way home, she hallucinates a girl falling on top of her car. She comes home to Yoon-jin playing along to the song from the cassette tape and hastily destroys the tape.

Jun-ki questions Mi-ju's bizarre behaviors and asks who Tae-yeon is. After clumsily deflecting, Mi-ju finally tells him about Tae-yeon. They were best friends in college, but Tae-yeon was jealous of Mi-ju for her talent. After Mi-ju was chosen as the main cellist, on the drive home, Tae-yeon drove straight into an oncoming truck. The crash killed her and gave Mi-ju the scars on her hand, rendering her unable to play.

Mi-ju attends Hae-young's homecoming concert, where she plays the song on the tape. The whole thing turns out to be a hallucination as Mi-ju sits alone in the theater with Tae-yeon's spirit appearing before her. At home, Yoon-hye encounters several illusions, ending with her dangling over the balcony. Yoon-jin peels off her little sister's fingers one by one until she falls to her death in front of Mi-ju.

Mi-ju hides Yoon-hye's body in the basement and lies to Jun-ki that Yoon-hye went to camp. Jun-ki quickly discovers the body and accuses Mi-ju of killing their daughter. In the ensuing struggle, Mi-ju accidentally pushes her husband into a sharp nail on the wall, killing him. Ji-sook appears, revealed to be possessed by Tae-yeon.

A flashback reveals the truth behind Mi-ju's story. She was jealous of Tae-yeon's talents. She caused the car crash that leave her best friend dangling over a cliff. Mi-ju initially grabbed Tae-yeon's arm, but changed her mind and let go, letting her fall to her death.

In the present, Mi-ju begs for Yoon-jin's life, and stabs Tae-yeon's ghost in the back, only to kill Ji-sook. The familiar song plays and she rushes to Yoon-jin's room. She smashes the cello, which is playing by itself, to pieces, ending the music. However, the hallucination ends and she realized she just beaten Yoon-jin to an inch of her life. Tae-yeon takes control of Mi-ju's hand, picking up a shard of glass to kill Yoon-jin. Mi-ju resists and stabs herself instead and the screen turns white.

Mi-ju wakes up in the hospital to find that she was into a coma after the truck crash at the beginning. All her family members are safe.

When Mi-ju returns home, the familiar sequence of events repeat: the taunting message, the birthday party. However, the vynil record has a scribbled inscription that reads "This is only the beginning." Tae-yeon's ghostly hands appear and grasp Mi-ju's face.

== Cast ==
- Sung Hyun-ah as Hong Mi-ju
- Park Da-an as Kim Tae-yeon
- Jeong Ho-bin as Jun-ki
- Jin Woo as Kyeong-ran
- Kim Na-woon as Sun-ae
- Jin Ji-hee as Yoon-hye
