= Garden of Heaven =

- Film poster
- Hangul: 하늘정원
- Hanja: 하늘庭園
- RR: Haneul jeongwon
- MR: Hanŭl chŏngwŏn
- Directed by: Lee Dong-hyeon
- Written by: Lee Han; Lee Ji-won
- Produced by: Kim Yong-beom; Lee Seok-gi
- Starring: Ahn Jae-wook; Lee Eun-ju
- Cinematography: Lee Seung-woo
- Edited by: Park Gok-ji
- Distributed by: Showbox
- Release date: April 4, 2003
- Running time: 95 minutes
- Country: South Korea
- Language: Korean

Garden of Heaven (Korean: 하늘 정원; RR: Haneul jeongwon) is a 2003 South Korean melodrama film directed by Lee Dong-hyeon and written by Lee Han, starring Ahn Jae-wook and Lee Eun-ju. The film marked Ahn Jae-wook's return to the big screen after 5 years, following the 1998 movie First Kiss.

== Plot ==
Oh-sung, a doctor at a hospice facility, is emotionally scarred from losing his parents as a child. One night he meets Young-ju, a make-up artist who has been diagnosed with terminal stomach cancer. Despite having very little time together, the two start to develop feelings for each other.

== Cast ==
- Ahn Jae-wook as Choi Oh-sung
- Lee Eun-ju as Kim Young-ju
- Son Jong-beom as Jeong Jeol
- Jeon Moo-song as Choi
- Oh Yoon-hong as Kim Young-ja
- Song Ok-sook as Moon
