= Kim Na-woon =

South Korean actress (born 1970)

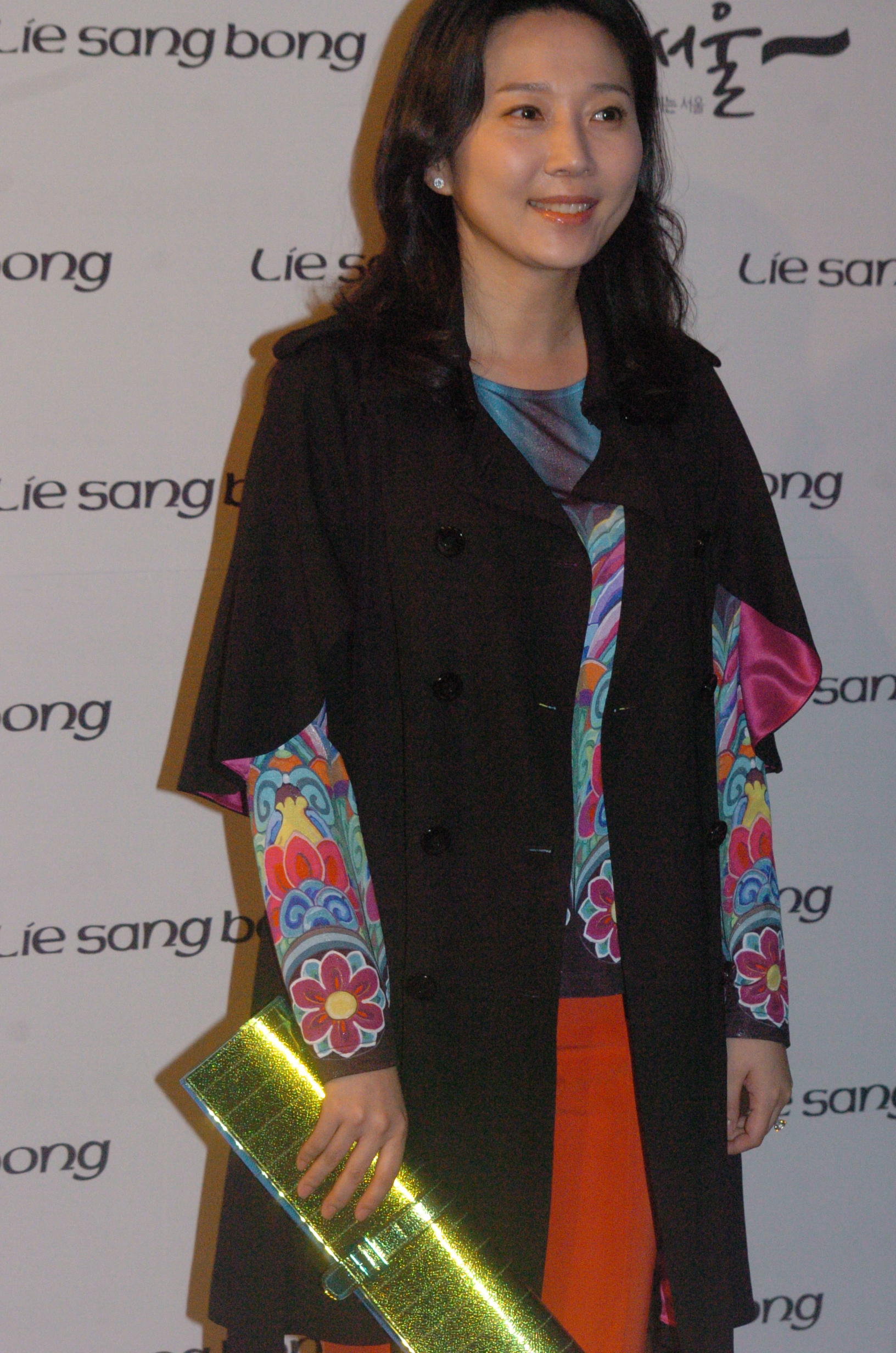
- Kim in 2012
- Born: May 11, 1970 (age 56); Seoul, South Korea
- Education: Seoul Institute of the Arts - Theater; Gwangju University - Journalism and Mass Communication
- Occupation: Actress
- Years active: 1987–present
- Agent: AllBox Holdings

Korean name
- Hangul: 김나운
- Hanja: 金那芸
- RR: Gim Naun
- MR: Kim Naun

Kim Na-woon (Korean: 김나운; born May 11, 1970) is a South Korean actress. She made her acting debut in 1987, and is most active as a supporting actress in television dramas.

== Filmography ==
=== Television series ===
Year	Title	Role
1987	Weird School	
1987	Blue Room	
1989	A Tree Blooming with Love	
1990	Our Paradise	
1990	Three Families Under One Roof	
1991	Another Happiness	
1991	Magpie Daughter-in-law	Employee at Mrs. Jin-jin's pizza shop
1991	Eyes of Dawn	Mae-ran
1992	Rainbow in Mapo	Hyang-sook
1993	My Mother's Sea	Joo-young
1994	Hidden Picture	
1994	The Road to You	
1995	You Said You Love Me	
1995	Auntie Ok	
1996	Reasons Not to Get Divorced	
1997	Cinderella	Seo Joon-seok's sister
1997	Conditions of Love	
1999	Trap of Youth	
1999	Rising Sun, Rising Moon	Older sister
1999	Do You Know My Son	Cha-soon
2000	Fireworks	So Yoo-ja
2000	More Than Love	Kim Dong-hee's older sister-in-law
2000	Doctor Doctor	Nurse Wang
2000	Autumn in My Heart	Housekeeping supervisor Kim
2001	Ladies of the Palace	So Wol-hyang
2001	Stock Flower	Supervisor Ha Bin-soo
2001	Flower Story	Cha Ok-shim
2001	Like Father, Unlike Son	Hwang Ji-yon
2001	Man of Autumn	Jung Sae-jin
2002	We Are Dating Now	Choi Kyo-sun
2002	Magic Kid Masuri	Ahn Ji-ni
2003	Snowman	Sun-young
2003	Yellow Handkerchief	Seo Joo-yeon
2003	Wedding Gift	Soo-kyung
2003	Garden of Eve	Song Myung-joo
2003	Perfect Love	Choi Jung-won
2004	Sweet Buns	Ahn Nam-hee
2005	My Sweetheart, My Darling	
2005	I Love You, My Enemy	Moon Soo-jin
2005	Lovers in Prague	Shin Kwang-ja
2005	Let's Get Married	Car sales manager
2006	Love and Hate	Myung-ja
2007	Dal-ja's Spring	Go Soon-ae
2008	Mom's Dead Upset	Jang Mi-yeon
2010	KBS Drama Special: "Reason"	Kim Ji-soo's sister-in-law
2010	The Scarlet Letter	Cha Young-rim
2010	KBS Drama Special: "Cutting Off the Heart"	Lee Jae-woo's sister
2011	Miss Ripley	Kang Shi-young
2011	Can't Lose	Divorce lawyer (guest, episode 5)
2011	Dear My Sister	Choi Jeom-rye
2012	Hometown Over the Hill 2	Seo Hye-joo
2012	Ugly Cake	Kim Ye-bin's mother
2012	School 2013	Kim Min-ki's mother
2013	Samsaengi	Oh Pil-soon
2013	The Queen of Office	Yeo Jang-mi
2013	A Little Love Never Hurts	Lee Yeon-hee
2014	Pride and Prejudice	Kim Myung-sook
2015	Kill Me, Heal Me	Yoon Ja-kyung
2015	The Return of Hwang Geum-bok	Oh Mal-ja
2015	Yong-pal	Kim Tae-hyun's mother
2016	W	Yoon Mi-ho (cameo)
2018	Mr. Sunshine	Madame Jo
2020	Fatal Promise	Choi Myung-hee

=== Film ===
Year	Title	Role
1987	School Days	
1990	Young-shim	Wol-sook
2002	Forgive Me Once Again Despite Hatred 2002	Mi-joo
2005	Cello	Sun-ae
2007	Underground Rendezvous	Young-hee's mother

=== Variety/radio show ===
Year	Title	Notes
1991	Live Tonight	Reporter
1994	New Generation Power Set	Host
1996	A Fresh Morning to the World	Host
1998	This Is Lee Taek-rim and Kim Na-woon's; Pleasant Afternoon at 2 o'clock	DJ
2003-2005	Sponge	Panelist
2005	I Want to Meet You Just One Time	
2007	Love in Asia	
2010	MBC Special: I Married a Korean Man	Documentary narrator
2012	Myth Verification Show: The Inside Story	Panelist
2013	Year-End Special: Magic Show Show Show	

=== Music video appearance ===
Year	Song title	Artist
2010	"Love Is Better Than Money"	Tae Jin-ah

== Awards and nominations ==
Year	Award	Category	Nominated work	Result
1998	MBC Drama Awards	Female Excellence Award in Radio	Pleasant Afternoon at 2 o'clock	Won
2008	KBS Drama Awards	Best Supporting Actress	Mom's Dead Upset	Nominated
