= Oh! My Lady =

- Promotional poster
- Also known as: Oh! My Love
- Genre: Romance, Comedy
- Written by: Goo Sun-young
- Directed by: Park Young-soo
- Starring: Chae Rim; Choi Si-won
- Country of origin: South Korea
- Original language: Korean
- No. of episodes: 16

Production
- Running time: Mondays and Tuesdays at 20:55 (Korea time)
- Production company: Pan Entertainment

Original release
- Network: SBS TV
- Release: 22 March – 11 May 2010

Oh! My Lady (Korean: 오! 마이 레이디) is a 2010 South Korean television series starring Chae Rim and Choi Si-won. It aired on SBS from March 22 to May 11, 2010. It is a romantic comedy about a top star who finds himself living with his manager, a 35-year-old woman who is trying to earn money to get custody of her child.

== Plot ==
A spunky 35-year-old housewife, Yoon Gae-hwa (Chae Rim), takes on the job of house cleaner to prickly top star Sung Min-woo (Choi Siwon) in order to earn enough money to regain custody of her child from her ex-husband. Romantic hijinks and hilarity ensues when they find themselves in an awkward living situation as Min-woo pays Gae-hwa to take care of his illegitimate daughter, Ye-eun.

== Cast ==
- Chae Rim as Yoon Gae-hwa
- Choi Si-won as Sung Min-woo
- Lee Hyun-woo as Yoo Shi-joon
- Moon Jeong-hee as Han Jung-ah
- Park Han-byul as Hong Yoo-ra
- Kim Kwang-kyu as Han Min-kwan
- Kim Hee-won as Jung Yoon-seok
- Yoo Tae-woong as Kim Byung-hak
- Yoo Seo-jin as Lee Bok-nim
- Hwang Hyo-eun as Oh Jae-hee
- Heo Joon-seok as Choi Tae-goo
- Hong Jong-hyun as Park Jin-ho
- Bang Joon-seo as Kim Min-ji
- Kim Yoo-bin as Ye-eun
- Lee Dae-yeon as Eom Dae-yong
- Chu Heon-yeob as Chae Ho-sepk
- Sulli as Min-woo's runway partner (cameo, ep 1)
- Lee Han-wi as director (cameo, ep 1)
- Jeon Hye-jin as actress (cameo, ep 1)
- Na Young-hee as Gae-hwa's former boss (cameo, ep 1)
- Jessica Jung as herself (cameo, ep 7)
- Choi Soo-young as herself (cameo, ep 7)
- Kim Hyo-yeon as herself (cameo, ep 7)
- Sung Hyuk

== Ratings ==
The first episode of Oh! My Lady scored 10 percent according to TNS Korea and 11.5 percent by AGB Nielsen Media Research.

== Soundtrack ==
1. 그대인형 (You're a Doll) - Sunny (Girls' Generation)
2. 못났죠 (Aren't I Stupid?) - Jo Seong-wook
3. Love Is - 4men
4. 도시의 천사 - DJ Ahn Kwa-jang
5. 꽃은 핀다
6. 그대 인형 (You're a Doll) (Scat ver.) - Gong Bo-kyung
7. 못났죠 (Aren't I Stupid?) (Guitar ver.)
8. 슬픈 미소
9. Love Is (Bossanova ver.)
10. 도시의 천사 (Inst.)
11. 못났죠 (Aren't I Stupid?) - Choi Siwon

== Awards and nominations ==
Year	Award	Category	Recipient	Result
2010	2010 SBS Drama Awards	New Star Award	Choi Siwon	Won
