= Doctor Doctor (South Korean TV series) =

2000 South Korean sitcom

Doctor Doctor (Korean: 닥터 닥터) is a South Korean sitcom produced by iTV in 2000. The background of the comedy focuses on the "Good Doctor Hospital". Several characters in the sitcom used their real names in their roles.

== Synopsis ==
The sitcom showed several gags among the staff. Once, Dr. Ahn had encountered an old patient who had received a bad treatment from Dr. Ahn and thought that she could receive free treatment. Dr. Ahn, being too ashamed to correct her that treatment is not free, agreed to give her a free treatment. The news spread around, and another man who came for "free treatment" was overjoyed and shooked a bewildered Dr. Ahn's hand. He later received a visitor, dressed in black from head-to-toe, praised his kindness for giving free treatment to patients, and asked if he wished to hold a merger between the two hospitals. During this time, the visitor received multiple calls from several handphones in one go during the visit, spoke in Japanese, German and English to the respective phone calls.

Dr. Baek had once insisted on helping a fellow female doctor on editing a videotape, and had to approach another female friend to borrow her tape-editor.

After Dr. Ahn's wife had left the household, he borrowed Nurse Wang's knitting set and secretly knitted a woollen coat in his office, once nearly getting caught by Dr. Baek when he entered the office. He later videotaped himself, using a camcorder to express his feelings to his wife.

Nurse Wang was also confronted by an arrogant illiterate, who claimed that he could read but could not see the words and yet insisted on not wearing glasses. Dr. Baek soothed him, and found him later that night outside the cafe with his right hand bandaged, saying that he was pretending to be injured, for punishing himself of being illiterate and not going to school.

Baek's friend stole Wang's painting unintentionally, seeing no one in the hospital premises when she entered the hospital after she had a problem with a wall painting on her cafe. She called out loud that she wanted to borrow the painting, but sneaked off subtly. Dr. Ahn, on the other hand, was busy talking away on his phone at one corner. The other colleagues were having a meeting in Dr. Baek's room, who proposed every colleague to prepare a one-thousand won note so as to safeguard themselves against dissatisfied customers. Dr. Ahn received multiple calls during the meeting, and the colleagues decided to kick him out of the room after Wang said that the meeting could drag onto the following day at this rate. When Wang suggested the possibility of confidence tricksters who wanted to trick them for the money, Dr. Baek thought to himself.

Wang was shocked to see that her painting was gone, and they ruled out that it was Dr. Ahn who was the most likely culprit, after thinking back about his strange behaviour of late. They raided Ahn's office, and found many things he had stolen from them but not the painting. They prepared a needle to treat his Clinical depression, and visited the cafe where Ahn was talking to a friend. They gagged him, and as Hung-pyo prepared to inject him and Yoon-sik trying to calm him down, telling his friend that he had clinical depression. The others frantically pointed to a painting hanging on the cafe wall. The owner then tried to soothe them down. Later, the hospital staff took a photo-gag session when the nurses fell onto the floor during the photoshoot session in the hospital.

One day, Baek dreamt of Jeong-hoon eating his pig's trotter to himself, not giving any to Jeong-hoon any even in his dreams. The next day, he woke up for breakfast, and asked if everybody had slept well. He then looked at Jeong-hoon, and scolded him for snatching his meat away in his dreams, and showing him disrespect, even in his dreams. The rest chided him for being so picky about a dream.

Later that night, Baek returned home, drunk, and scolded Jeong-hoon for being disrespectful. Hung-pyo then carried Baek up to his room, as he continued his scoldings against Jeomg-hoon. When Baek fell asleep, he dreamt of he himself falling down from the stairs, and asked for Jeong-hoon to help him up. Jeong-hoon held his hands, and stepped on his leg hard and ran away.

The next day, Hye-eun was told to send Kimchi to nurse Wang's home. She witnessed that they were having a starring competition, seeing who could keep her eyes for a longer period of time. Hye-eun broke up the game and told them to stop their childish game, and again just before she left.

== Cast ==
- Baek Yoon-sik - Dr. Baek Yoon-sik
- Son Ji-chang - Dr. Ahn Jeong-hoon
- Kim Hung-pyo - Ahn Hung-pyo
- Kim Na-woon - Nurse Wang
- Lee Hye-eun - Nurse Jeong Hye-eun
