= Kim Hye-jin (actress) =

South Korean actress and model

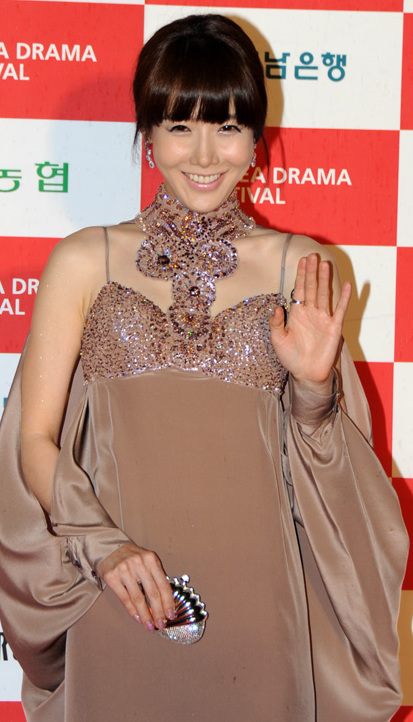
- Kim at the 2010 Korea Drama Festival
- Born: February 28, 1975 (age 51)
- Occupations: Actress; model; presenter
- Years active: 2004–present
- Known for: Role as Yang Jung-in in Iris

Korean name
- Hangul: 김혜진
- Hanja: 金慧進
- RR: Gim Hyejin
- MR: Kim Hyejin

Kim Hye-jin (born February 28, 1975) is a South Korean actress. She is best known for her role in the 2009 television series Iris. She has appeared in Sweet 18 (2004), My Rosy Life (2005), The Secret of Birth (2013) and many more TV series. In 2020, she has confirmed her appearance in JTBC's drama Undercover, a remake of 2016 BBC miniseries of the same name.

== Filmography ==
=== Films ===
Year	Title	Role	Notes	Ref.
2004	Some	Piercing car woman 1		
2004	The Scarlet Letter	Oh Yeon-sim	Award winning film	
2008	Scandal Makers	Reporter		
2009	Flight	Seong-joo		
2015	Malice	Hospital director	Special appearance	

=== Television series ===
Year	Title	Role	Ref.
2004	Sweet 18		
2004	Lovers in Paris	Clothing store manager	
2004	Immortal Admiral Yi Sun-sin	Clothing store manager	
2005	My Rosy Life		
2009	Iris	NSS data director, Yang Jeong-in	
2010	Dong Yi	Seol-hee	
2013	The Secret of Birth	Lee Hye-young	
2021	Undercover	Jung-hee	
