= Lee Yoo-jin (actress) =

South Korean actress (born 1977)

- Born: 8 January 1977 (age 49); Seoul, South Korea
- Other name: Lee Yu-jin
- Education: Seoul Women's University – Biology
- Occupation: Actress
- Years active: 1998–present
- Agent: SidusHQ
- Spouse: Kim Wan-joo (m. 2010; div. 2013)

Korean name
- Hangul: 이유진
- RR: I Yujin
- MR: I Yujin

Lee Yoo-jin (Korean: 이유진; born 8 January 1977) is a South Korean actress and TV host. Lee began modeling as a teenager and made her entertainment debut in the Super Elite Model Contest in 1998. She switched quickly to acting, playing supporting roles in television dramas such as Beautiful Days, Girl's High School Days, Into the Sun, and Phoenix.

== Personal life ==
In May 2003, Lee held a press conference and tearfully acknowledged that she was of mixed race. She had previously denied the rumors that she was biracial, but fans had long suspected the truth from her 5-foot-9 stature (5 inches taller than the average Korean woman) and naturally creased eyelids. Lee told reporters that she had been afraid of being discriminated against, saying, "People ask why didn't I come out earlier and why this is such a big deal. It wouldn't be anywhere else, but Korea is still a closed society where people like to talk about the purity of the race." Lee was born to a South Korean mother and a Hispanic-American U.S. Army soldier; her parents married in 1976 while her father was stationed in Korea, but they divorced when she was 1 year old and he returned to the United States. Lee has had no contact with her birth father and she was raised solely by her single mother. South Korea uses a traditional Confucian-inspired family registry that requires children to be listed under their fathers' names and their fathers to be Korean—so that children with foreign fathers are in effect nonpersons under the law. Lee, for example, was registered under her grandfather's name, making her, under the law, her mother's sister. Lee said she considers herself to be entirely Korean in mentality.

Lee married ice hockey coach Kim Wan-joo on 14 October 2010 at the Seoul Renaissance Hotel.

== Filmography ==
=== Television drama ===
- Beautiful Days (SBS, 2001)
- Legend (SBS, 2001)
- Girl's High School Days (KBS2, 2002–2003)
- Into the Sun (SBS, 2003)
- Phoenix (MBC, 2004)
- Choice (SBS, 2004–2005)
- Two Wives (SBS, 2009)
- Gangnam Scandal (SBS, 2018–2019)

=== Film ===
- Don't Tell Papa (2004)
- How To Keep My Love (2004)
- Mapado 2 : Back to the Island (2007)

=== Variety show ===
- Lee Yoo-jin's High Heels (MBC Every 1, 2007)
- Man's Operating Manual (ETN, 2008)
- 과학실험 하와이 (EBS, 2008)
- Owl (MBC Drama, 2010)
- Scifun (EBS, 2010)
- 기업 열전 K1 (KBS, 2010)
- Nobel Fellowship (YTN Science, 2011)
- 나의 사무실은 당신의 술집보다 아름답다 (MBN, 2011)
- Buwoong Season 1 (MBC Every 1, 2011)
- 스타부부 한마당 (KBS2, 2011)
- Saturday Across Generations (KBS, 2012)

=== Radio program ===
- This is Yoon Jung-soo and Lee Yoo-jin's Good Weekend Hurray (MBC FM, 2011)
- Yoon Jung-soo and Lee Yoo-jin's 2 PM Hurray (MBC FM, 2013)
