= Virgin Stripped Bare by Her Bachelors =

- Theatrical poster
- Hangul: 오! 수정
- RR: O! Sujeong
- MR: O! Sujŏng
- Directed by: Hong Sang-soo
- Written by: Hong Sang-soo
- Produced by: Ahn Byeong-ju
- Starring: Lee Eun-ju; Moon Sung-keun; Jeong Bo-seok
- Cinematography: Choi Yeong-taek
- Edited by: Hahm Sung-won
- Music by: Ok Gil-seong
- Production company: Mirashin Korea
- Distributed by: Buena Vista International Korea
- Release date: 26 May 2000 (South Korea)
- Running time: 126 minutes
- Country: South Korea
- Language: Korean

Virgin Stripped Bare by Her Bachelors (Oh! Soo-jeong) is a 2000 South Korean erotic comedy-drama film, directed by Hong Sang-soo. It was screened in the Un Certain Regard section at the 2000 Cannes Film Festival.

It follows the romantic travails of a video producer and a gallery owner, and the web of deceit they spin around their relationship. It was an early success in the short career of female star Lee Eun-ju, who took her own life five years later.

The English title of the film is a reference to Marcel Duchamp's artwork The Bride Stripped Bare By Her Bachelors, Even.

== Plot ==
Soo-jung (Lee Eun-ju) is a scriptwriter for a local cable TV station. She is close with the program producer Young-soo (Moon Sung-keun). In attempts to urge his rich friend Jae-hoon to finance an independent film he is currently directing, Young-soo visits Jae-hoon's (Jeong Bo-seok) gallery with Soo-jung tagging along. Jae-hoon finds himself attracted to Soo-jung and asks her to become his lover. Soo-jung somewhat reluctantly accepts the offer on condition that it will only be when they go out for a drink. Their tug-of-war reveals that Soo-jung is still a virgin and this impresses Jae-hoon as well as escalates his frustration. Meanwhile, Young-soo also expresses his feelings for Soo-jung. Soo-jung will have to decide whether to surrender her virginity as Jae-hoon anxiously awaits her at a hotel room.

== Cast ==
- Lee Eun-ju as Soo-jung
- Moon Sung-keun as Young-soo
- Jeong Bo-seok as Jae-hoon

== Awards ==
2000 Asia-Pacific Film Festival

- Best Screenplay - Hong Sang-soo

2001 Grand Bell Awards

- Best New Actress - Lee Eun-ju

2000 Asia-Pacific Film Festival

- Best Screenplay

2000 Tokyo International Film Festival

- Special Mention
