= Byun Hyuk =

South Korean filmmaker (born 1966)

- Born: January 1, 1966 (age 60); South Korea
- Education: La Fémis
- Occupations: Film director, screenwriter
- Years active: 1990–present

Korean name
- Hangul: 변혁
- RR: Byeon Hyeok
- MR: Pyŏn Hyŏk

Byun Hyuk (Korean: 변혁; born January 1, 1966), also known as Daniel H. Byun, is a South Korean film director and screenwriter. He graduated from La Fémis in 1997.

Best known for his working on his film debut Interview (2000) using the Dogme 95 movement, being the first Asian film to do so.

== Filmography ==
- Homo Videocus (short film) (1990)
- Interview (Dogme #7) (2000)
- The Scarlet Letter (2004)
- Five Senses of Eros (segment "His Concern") (2009)
- High Society (2018)
