= Chae Rim =

South Korean actress (born 1979)

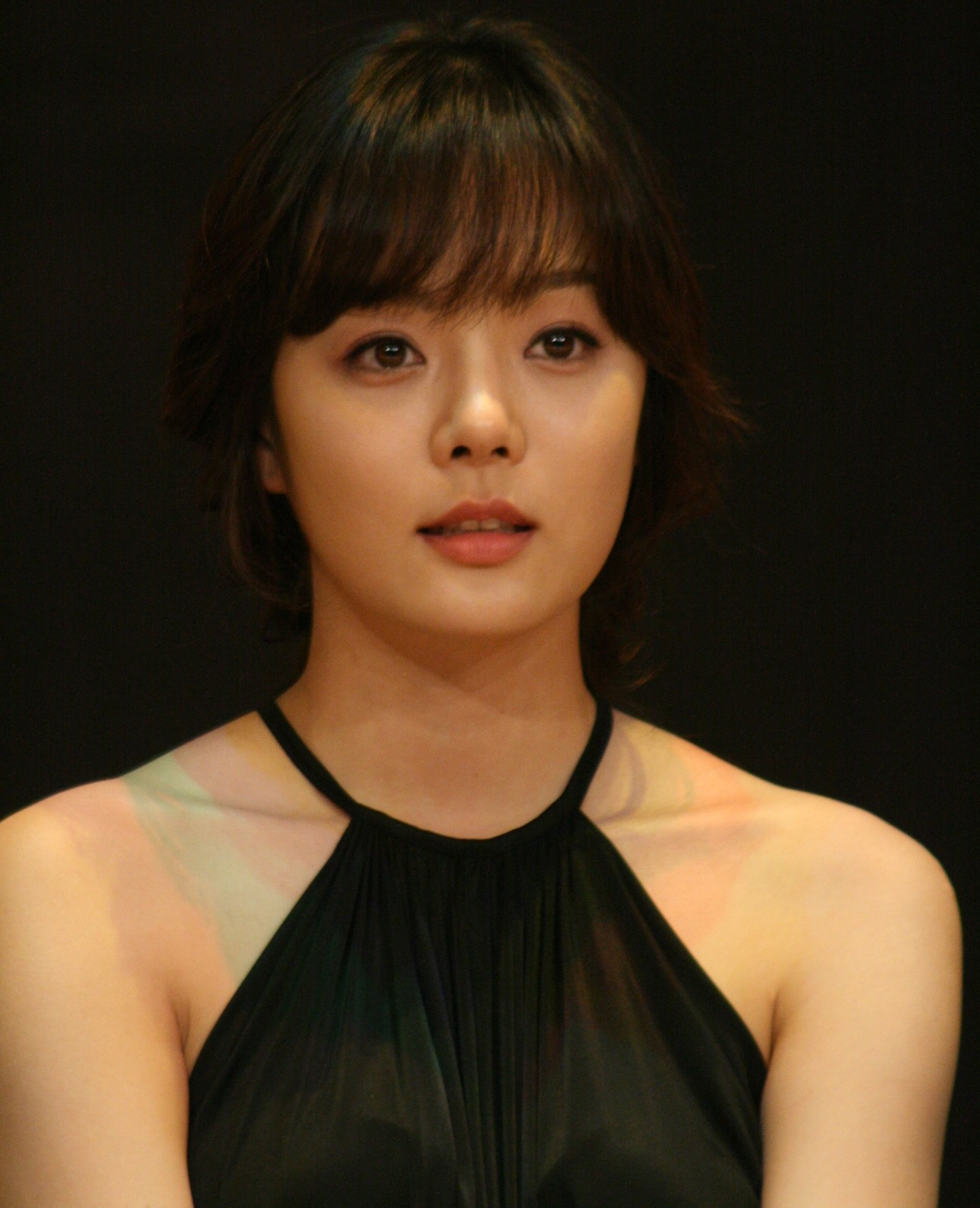
- Born: Park Chae-Rim; March 28, 1979 (age 47); Seoul, South Korea
- Occupation: Actress
- Years active: 1994–present
- Spouses: Lee Seung-hwan (m. 2003; div. 2006); Gao Ziqi (m. 2014; div. 2020)
- Children: 1

Korean name
- Hangul: 박채림
- Hanja: 朴蔡琳
- RR: Bak Chaerim
- MR: Pak Ch'aerim

Park Chae-rim (Korean: 박채림; born March 28, 1979), known as Chae Rim, is a South Korean actress who debuted in 1994. She has starred in Korean dramas including All About Eve (2000), Dal-ja's Spring (2007), and Oh! My Lady (2010).

== Career ==
Chae Rim debuted as Miss Haitai in 1994. Having starred in many television dramas, becoming famous for her roles in All About Eve and Dal-ja's Spring in the '00s. She enjoys great popularity as a Korean Wave star in China and Taiwan, having made several series there.

Chae Rim also co-hosted the MBC variety show Music Camp from 1999 to 2000. In 2010 Park returned to the small screen with Oh! My Lady, co-starring Siwon of Super Junior. It is a romantic comedy about a top star who finds himself living with his manager, a 35-year-old woman who is trying to earn money to get custody of her child.

In November 2018, Chae Rim signed with new agency Hunus Entertainment.

== Personal life ==
Chae Rim married singer Lee Seung-hwan (14 years her senior) on May 24, 2003. On March 31, 2006, Lee's agency Cloud Fish released news of the couple's divorce, stating that due to personality differences, the couple had been separated since December 2005.

In March 2014, she acknowledged that she was dating Chinese actor Gao Ziqi. Gao and Chae Rim were married in China on October 14, 2014. She gave birth to a son, Min-Woo, in December 2017. They divorced in 2020.

== Filmography ==
=== Drama ===
- 1994: Warm River
- 1994: Journey
- 1995 MBC: Pair
- 1996 MBC: A Daughter's Choice
- 1997 MBC: Ban Buhl Ee
- 1998 SBS: My Mother's Daughters
- 1998 KBS: As We Live Our Lives
- 1998 MBC: Jump
- 1998 MBC: Shy Lovers
- 1999 KBS: Lost One's Way / The Song Of Hope
- 1999 SBS: KAIST
- 1999 MBC: I'm Still Loving You
- 1999 Happy Together
- 2000 MBC: Air Force
- 2000 MBC: All About Eve
- 2000 SBS: Cheers for the Women
- 2001 MBC: Four Sisters
- 2002 SBS: We Are Dating Now
- 2003 KBS: Over the Green Fields
- 2004 KBS: Oh! Pil Seung, Bong Soon Young
- 2004 SBS Banjun Drama: Suite Room
- 2004 Taiwan CTS: Love at the Aegean Sea
- 2004 Taiwan CTV: Warriors of The Yang Clan
- 2005 Hong Kong ATV: Taming Of The Shrew / Princess Sheng Ping
- 2006 Lost City in Snow Heaven (cameo)
- 2006 China BTV: Secret History of Kangxi
- 2007 KBS: Dal-ja's Spring
- 2008 KBS: Formidable Rivals
- 2009 MBC: Good Job, Good Job
- 2010 SBS: Oh! My Lady
- 2010 China ZJTV: Fall in Love with Anchor Beauty (cameo)

=== Variety shows ===
Year	Title	Role	Note
2021	Honki Club	Cast Member	

== Awards ==
- 1998 MBC Drama Awards: Best New Actress
- 1999 Baeksang Arts Awards: Best New Actress in TV (I'm Still Loving You)
- 1999 MBC Drama Awards: Best Couple Award
- 1999 MBC Drama Awards: Popularity Award
- 2000 SBS Drama Awards: Popularity Award
- 2006 China Annual Golden TVS Awards: Most Popular International Star
- 2007 China BQ Awards: Favorite Asian Star Award
- 2007 KBS Drama Awards: Top Excellence Award, Actress (Dal-ja's Spring)
