= Lee Hyun-woo (entertainer, born 1966) =

South Korean singer, actor

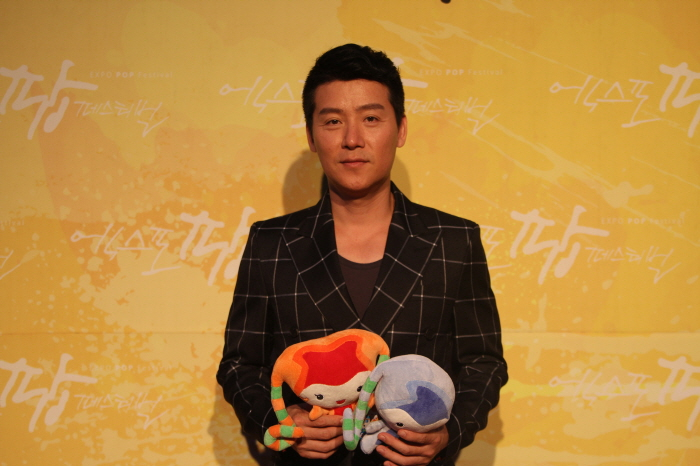
- Lee in 2014
- Born: Lee Sang-won; March 6, 1966 (age 60); Seoul, South Korea
- Other name: Jessie Lee
- Education: Parsons The New School for Design – Industrial Design; Kyungwon University Graduate School – Fine Arts
- Occupations: Singer; actor
- Years active: 1990–present
- Agent: H.W. Entertainment
- Spouse: Lee Je-ni (m. 2009)
- Children: 2

Korean name
- Hangul: 이현우
- RR: I Hyeonu
- MR: I Hyŏnu

Birth name
- Hangul: 이상원
- RR: I Sangwon
- MR: I Sangwŏn

Lee Hyun-woo, born Lee Sang-won (March 6, 1966), also known as Jessie Lee, is a Korean-American singer and actor.

== Career ==
Lee Hyun-woo made his entertainment debut in 1991 with the album Black Rainbow and rose to fame with hit songs such as "Dream" and "Day After the Break-up." He later transitioned into acting, appearing in television dramas such as Cats on the Roof (2003), Wedding (2005), Dal-ja's Spring (2007) and Oh! My Lady (2010), as well as the films S Diary (2004), Before the Summer Passes Away (2007), and The Forgotten Bag (2011).

== Personal life ==
Lee married freelance curator Lee Je-ni on February 21, 2009. Their first son Lee Dong-ha was born in September 2009, and their second son Lee Ju-ha was born in April 2011; both appeared with him in the reality show The Return of Superman.

On January 13, 1993, Lee was arrested on suspicion of marijuana possession; he was released on bail on February 1. In March 1993, he was banned from appearing on the TV networks KBS and SBS, so he went on hiatus and lived in the United States until his return to the Korean entertainment scene in November of that year. He was also fined for an incident involving a DUI and driving without a license on February 18, 2007.

== Discography ==
=== Album ===
- Black Rainbow (1991)
- Blue Vanity (1993)
- Let's Go Fishing (1996)
- Freewill of My Heart (1997)
- Both Sides of the Story (1998)
- Virus (2000)
- Free Your Mind & Body (2001)
- Da Painkiller (2003)
- Sinful Seduction (2004)
- Heart Blossom (2007)
- Till Dawn (2011)

=== Soundtrack appearances ===
- "I Wish I Had a Wife" (track from I Wish I Had a Wife OST, 2001)
- "지금 내게 필요한 건..." (track from Man in Crisis OST, 2002)
- "Join in Love" (track from Exhibition of Fireworks OST, 2006)
- "Can't Stop Loving You" (track from The Invisible Man, Choi Jang-soo OST, 2006)
- "Love Night" (track from Loving You a Thousand Times OST, 2009)
- "Holic 2012" (track from Hero, 2012)

== Filmography ==
=== Television series ===
- Cats on the Roof (MBC, 2003)
- The Woman Who Wants to Marry (MBC, 2004)
- Sad Love Story (MBC, 2005)
- Wedding (KBS2, 2005)
- Love Can't Wait (MBC, 2006)
- Singles Game (SBS, 2006)
- Dal-ja's Spring (KBS2, 2007)
- Oh! My Lady (SBS, 2010)
- Salamander Guru and The Shadows (SBS, 2012) (cameo, episode 5)
- A Hundred Year Legacy (MBC, 2013)
- Ruby Ring (KBS2, 2013)
- Entertainer (SBS, 2016)

=== Film ===
- Saturday, 2 p.m. (1998)
- The Beauty in Dream (2002)
- S Diary (2004)
- My Boyfriend Is Type B (2005)
- Ssunday Seoul (2006)
- Before the Summer Passes Away (2007)
- The Forgotten Bag (2011)

=== Variety show ===
- Wednesday Art Stage (MBC, 1997–2004)
- Showdown! Star Chef (SBS, 2009)
- I Am a Singer (MBC, 2012)
- The Return of Superman (KBS2, 2013)
- King of Mask Singer (MBC, 2016)

== Musical theatre ==
- Singles (2007)
- Mamma Mia! (2011; 2016; 2019; 2023; 2025)

== Radio program ==
- Lee Hyun-woo's Music Live (SBS Power FM)
- Lee Hyun-woo's Music Album (KBS 2FM)

== Cookbook author ==
- Lee Hyun-woo's Easy Cooking for Singles (2002)
- Happy Recipes of Happy Dad Lee Hyun-woo (2010)
