= Gold Miss =

South Korean term for unmarried women

In South Korea, a gold miss (Korean: 골드미스) is an unmarried woman with a high socioeconomic status and level of education. These women frequently have a long career and enjoy being single as a result of social changes that have made marriage later in life common and reduced gender discrimination in the work place. They are also interested in developing themselves and their skills. They frequently spend much money shopping and enjoying trips overseas.

They are often criticised with the derogatory term "doenjang girls" ('soy bean paste girls') which characterizes them as obsessed with brand names and their appearance. Doenjang girl has similar negative connotations to the term gold digger in English-speaking countries. A gold miss, though, is not the same as a doenjang girl; gold misses are able to make social and economical progress, building up wealth for themselves and enjoying their lives using their own resources.

A gold miss should not be confused with similar Japanese concept, the hanakosan. The difference between a hanakosan and a gold miss is that a hanakosan is a woman who has failed to find a marriage; by contrast, a gold miss normally chooses not to marry.

== Characteristics of a gold miss ==
An unmarried woman with a high level of academic education, who receives a high income as a professional worker, can be defined as a gold miss. In addition, the term refers to single woman, aged in her mid-30s or above, who has a job at a major company. Gold misses often make over 40 million won per year, and can sometimes be worth over 80 million won (acquired through either investment or real estate).

== Gold miss and marketing ==
The term gold miss (골드미스) was originally used in Korean in a social and economic context, because gold misses were leading the new trend of consumption in the travel business, the fashion industry, the beauty industry, and the food service industry.

== Old Miss ==
A similar term, old miss, refers to an elderly woman who has passed the suitable time for marriage, roughly equivalent to the words spinster and old maid in English-speaking countries. The suitable time for marriage can differ widely, depending on an individual's culture or era.

== Gold miss vs silver miss ==
The term silver miss refers to a single working woman who is outperformed by a gold miss. This term most probably derives from the lower status silver has with gold. The single working women described as 'Silver Misses' normally satisfy three conditions: firstly, they have graduated from university; secondly, their annual income is about thirty million won; thirdly, they are between thirty and forty years old. Their interests and career plans tend to be similar to those of a gold miss. However, silver misses tend to be less wealthy than gold misses, so they must minimise their expenses.

== Criticism of the term gold miss ==
The term gold miss might seem to be a friendly colloquial expression describing a woman's abilities. However, it has been criticised for concealing a concern with materialism and discrimination against women. In addition, it suggests that non-standard female workers are being problematised. Sang-soo Ahn, who works in Korean Women's Development Institute, said "Despite the appearance of 'Gold Miss', most women are pressured into following the traditional role of their gender."

== See also ==
- The variety show "Gold Miss is coming" involves six female entertainers (who are described as gold misses) participating in various activities, including blind dates.
- The film "Queen of Reversals" is about a woman (Director Han Song-yi, played by Ha Yoo-mi) who corresponds to the characteristics of a gold miss. Director Han Song-yi is a female executive in charge of marketing in Queens Cosmetic company. She has an enormous passion for her work.
- The book "Gold Miss Diary" (original title : Why Smart Men Marry Smart Women)
