= Pilnyeo =

- Hangul: 필녀
- Hanja: 必女
- RR: Pillyeo
- MR: P'illyŏ
- Directed by: Jeong So-yeong
- Written by: Kim Soo-hyun
- Produced by: Kang Dae-jin
- Starring: Namkoong Won; Kim Yun-jeong; Do Kum-bong
- Cinematography: Lee Seong-chun
- Edited by: Lee Kyeong-ja
- Music by: Choi Chang-kwon
- Distributed by: Samyeong Film
- Release date: October 30, 1970
- Country: South Korea
- Language: Korean

Pilnyeo (Korean: 필녀; lit. 'A Needed Woman') is a South Korean melodrama film directed by Jeong So-yeong in 1970.

== Plot ==
Twice widowed, Pilnyeo vows never to marry again and takes a job at a coal mine. One day she is raped by her supervisor, but later marries him. Pilnyeo continues to be abused by her new husband, but later risks her own life for him.

== Awards ==
1971 7th Baeksang Arts Awards

- Best Director - Jeong So-yeong
- Best Producer - Jeong So-yeong
- Best New Actress - Kim Yun-jeong
- Technical Award - Son In-ho

1971 14th Buil Film Awards

- Best Actor - Namkoong Won

1971 8th Blue Dragon Film Awards

- Best Screenplay - Kim Soo-hyun
