= Ha Joon-won =

South Korean film director (born 1976)

- 하준원
- Born: 1976 (age 49–50)
- Occupations: Film director; screenwriter; producer
- Years active: 1983–present
- Father: Hah Myung-joong

Ha Joon-won (Korean: 하준원; born 1976) is a South Korean film director and screenwriter. He co-wrote Bong Joon-ho's The Host (2006) and wrote and directed Dead Man (2024).

== Life and career ==
Ha Joon-won was born in 1976, He is the second son of filmmaker and actor Hah Myung-joong and film producer Park Kyung-ae. His elder brother, Ha Sang-won, is an actor. Ha began his career as a child actor in 1983, appearing in his father's film X. The family later collaborated on the 2007 film Mom Never Dies, with Myung-joong directing and Joon-won producing.

Ha, who has 22 film credits as of 2025, is best known for co-scripting Bong Joon-ho's 2006 monster film The Host, and his feature directorial debut Dead Man (2024).

== Filmography ==
- X (1983) - appearance
- One Fine Day (2003; short film) - director
- Sink and Rise (2004) - assistant director
- The Host (2006) - screenwriter [with Bong Joon-ho and Baek Chul-hyun]
- Mom Never Dies (2007) - producer
- Moby Dick (2011)
- Dead Man (2024; feature film) - director and screenwriter
