= Kim Byung-se =

South Korean actor (born 1962)

- Born: September 26, 1962 (age 64); South Korea
- Education: California State University Long Beach
- Occupation: Actor

Korean name
- Hangul: 김병세
- Hanja: 金炳世
- RR: Gim Byeongse
- MR: Kim Pyŏngse

Kim Byung-se (born September 26, 1962) is a South Korean actor. Kim attended California State University Long Beach. Kim is an avid golfer and can be often seen golfing on his Instagram. Him and his wife have two dogs.

== Filmography ==
=== Film ===
Year	Title	Role
1993	Western Avenue	
1994	I Wish for What Is Forbidden to Me	
1994	Rosy Days	
1994	Coffee, Copy and a Bloody Nose	
1997	The Harmonica of Grief	
1997	1818 (Profanity)	
1998	Naked Being	Yu-seok
1999	L'AMOUR	
2002	KT	Kim Jung-won
2006	A Millionaire's First Love	

=== Television series ===
Year	Title	Role	Network
1994	Kareisky	Ki-chul	MBC
1995	Do You Remember Love?		MBC
1996	Im Kkeok-jeong	Lee Jang-geun	SBS
1997	When She Beckons		KBS2
1998	Legendary Ambition	Yoo Min-jae	KBS2
1998	Paper Crane		KBS2
1999	Queen	Kim Yong-joo	SBS
1999	Hur Jun	Yoo Do-ji	MBC
2000	Mr. Duke	Kang Sung-il	MBC
2000	Ajumma	Oh Il-kwon	MBC
2000	Pardon	Han Joon-sup	SBS
2001	Orient Theatre	Hong Soon-woon	KBS2
2001	Outing	Hwang Jung-nam	SBS
2002	Dae Bak Family		SBS
2002	Bad Girls	Jun Taek-su	SBS
2003	Age of Warriors	King Myung-jong	KBS1
2003	Garden of Eve	Im Dong-hyun	SBS
2003	All In	Michael Jang	SBS
2004	Phoenix	Kim Ho-jin	MBC
2004	Jang Gil-san	Kim Gi	SBS
2004	You are a Star	Choon-bu	KBS1
2005	Queen's Conditions	Han Seong-woo	SBS
2005	Jikji	Prince Jungahn	SBS
2006	I Want to Love	Kang Ji-hun	SBS
2007	My Husband's Woman	Heo Dal-sam	SBS
2007	The King and I	King Sejo	SBS
2008	Last Scandal	Ahn Yoo-shik	MBC
2008	Chunja's Special Day	Park Dal-sam	MBC
2008	Terroir	Andre Lim	SBS
2009	What's for Dinner?	Bae Do-suk	MBC
2009	Swallow the Sun	Tony	SBS
2010	Jejungwon	Second Japanese minister	SBS
2010	Three Sisters	Jae-suk	SBS
2011	Midas	James	SBS
2011	My Bittersweet Life	Cha Sung-joo	KBS1
2011	Color of Women	Nam Joong-geun	Channel A
2012	Full House Take 2	Hwang Bum-soo	SBS Plus
2012	Jeon Woo-chi	Oh Yong	KBS2
2013	Love in Her Bag	Kim Jong-wook	jTBC
2013	The Eldest	Lee Sang-nam	jTBC
2014	Flower Grandpa Investigation Unit	Choi Jae-wook	tvN
2015	Love on a Rooftop	Jang Beom-seok	KBS2
2015	My Unfortunate Boyfriend		MBC Dramanet
2015	Glamorous Temptation	Jin Hyeong-woo's father	MBC
2016	Beautiful Gong Shim	lawyer	SBS
2017	Man to Man	Cha Myung-seok	jTBC
2017	Reunited Worlds	Lee Gun-chul	SBS
2018	Radio Romance	Ji Yoon-seok	KBS2

== Awards and nominations ==
Year	Award	Category	Nominated work	Result
1994	14th Korean Association of Film Critics Awards	Best New Actor	Rosy Days	Won
2002	2002 SBS Entertainment Awards	Excellence Award, Actor in a Sitcom	Dae Bak Family	Won
2007	2007 SBS Drama Awards	Best Couple Award with Ha Yoo-mi	My Husband's Woman	Won
2010	2010 SBS Entertainment Awards	Special Award in Variety	Star King	Won
