= My Husband's Woman =

- Promotional poster
- Also known as: My Man's Woman; My Husband's Lover
- Written by: Kim Soo-hyun
- Directed by: Jung Eul-young
- Starring: Kim Hee-ae; Bae Jong-ok; Kim Sang-joong
- Composers: Gaemi; Lee Chang-hee
- Country of origin: South Korea
- Original language: Korean
- No. of episodes: 24

Production
- Executive producer: Go Heung Shik (SBS)
- Running time: Mondays and Tuesdays at 21:55 (KST)
- Production companies: Samhwa Networks; Segyo Entertainment; Media Plant

Original release
- Network: SBS TV
- Release: April 2 – June 19, 2007

My Husband's Woman (Korean: 내 남자의 여자; RR: Nae namjaui yeoja; lit. 'My Man's Woman') is a 2007 South Korean television series starring Kim Hee-ae, Bae Jong-ok, and Kim Sang-joong. It aired on SBS TV from April 2 to June 19, 2007, on Mondays and Tuesdays at 21:55 for 24 episodes.

Written by renowned TV scribe Kim Soo-hyun in her no-nonsense yet provocative style, the TV series explores the intimate and painful ordeal of women on both sides of the story behind an extramarital affair, delving into the minds of the betrayed and the betrayer.

It was the second highest-rated Korean drama of 2007 (next to Jumong), and won Kim Hee-ae the Grand Prize ("Daesang") at the 2007 SBS Drama Awards.

== Plot ==
Ji-soo (Bae Jong-ok) is an unassuming housewife leading a happy life with her college professor husband Joon-pyo (Kim Sang-joong) and their son Kyung-min (Park Ji-bin). But trouble lurks when Ji-soo's widowed friend Hwa-young (Kim Hee-ae) accompanies Ji-soo and her family on a trip and secretly begins a love affair with Joon-pyo. One day, Ji-soo hosts a barbeque party at her house and invites Hwa-young and her sister Eun-soo (Ha Yoo-mi). Besieged by passion, Hwa-young and Joon-pyo end up making out inside the kitchen, but soon get caught red-handed by Eun-soo. Shocked and sickened to her stomach, yet nervous about what her fragile sister might do if she ever finds out, Eun-soo threatens Hwa-young and Joon-pyo to end the affair immediately. But truth has a way of slipping out, and Ji-soo's perfect life comes crashing down when she learns that her husband is having an affair with her friend. In the aftermath of the revelation, the psychological warfare begins, and to retaliate, Ji-soo decides to have an affair herself with her old college friend Seok Joon (Lee Jong-won).

== Cast ==
=== Main characters ===
- Kim Hee-ae as Lee Hwa-young
- Bae Jong-ok as Kim Ji-soo
- Kim Sang-joong as Hong Joon-pyo
- Lee Jong-won as Park Seok-joon

=== Supporting characters ===
- Ha Yoo-mi as Kim Eun-soo, Ji-soo's sister
- Kim Byung-se as Heo Dal-sam, Eun-soo's husband
- Song Yi-woo as Heo Jin-joo, Eun-soo's daughter
- Jang Ki-bum as Heo Joon-goo, Eun-soo's son
- Song Jae-ho as Kim Yong-deok, Ji-soo's father
- Nam Seung-min as Kim Kyung-soo, Ji-soo's brother
- Oh Se-jung as Boo Yong-hwa, Kyung-soo's wife
- Seo Woo-rim as Ms. Hwang, Joon-pyo's mother
- Choi Jung-hoon as Chairman Hong, Joon-pyo's father
- Park Ji-bin as Hong Kyung-min, Ji-soo's and Joon-pyo's son
- Kim Young-ae as Hwa-young's mother
- Lee Hoon as Lee Dong-ha, Hwa-young's brother
- Song Sun-hee
- Kwon Yong-chul
- Joo Min-soo

== Episode ratings ==
| Date | Episode | Nationwide | Seoul |
|---|---|---|---|
| 2007-04-02 | 1 | 11.2 (14th) | 11.8 (14th) |
| 2007-04-03 | 2 | 13.1 (12th) | 14.2 (10th) |
| 2007-04-09 | 3 | 12.8 (9th) | 14.1 (9th) |
| 2007-04-10 | 4 | 15.8 (8th) | 17.1 (6th) |
| 2007-04-16 | 5 | 17.5 (6th) | 18.7 (4th) |
| 2007-04-17 | 6 | 20.0 (4th) | 21.6 (3rd) |
| 2007-04-23 | 7 | 18.9 (4th) | 20.0 (4th) |
| 2007-04-24 | 8 | 21.5 (2nd) | 23.0 (2nd) |
| 2007-04-30 | 9 | 21.0 (2nd) | 22.9 (2nd) |
| 2007-05-01 | 10 | 22.2 (2nd) | 24.3 (2nd) |
| 2007-05-07 | 11 | 19.4 (2nd) | 21.0 (2nd) |
| 2007-05-08 | 12 | 22.1 (2nd) | 24.4 (2nd) |
| 2007-05-14 | 13 | 23.7 (2nd) | 25.3 (2nd) |
| 2007-05-15 | 14 | 27.2 (2nd) | 29.3 (1st) |
| 2007-05-21 | 15 | 25.2 (2nd) | 27.0 (2nd) |
| 2007-05-22 | 16 | 25.9 (2nd) | 28.1 (1st) |
| 2007-05-28 | 17 | 29.3 (1st) | 32.8 (1st) |
| 2007-05-29 | 18 | 31.6 (1st) | 35.4 (1st) |
| 2007-06-04 | 19 | 32.4 (1st) | 34.9 (1st) |
| 2007-06-05 | 20 | 32.3 (1st) | 33.5 (1st) |
| 2007-06-11 | 21 | 33.4 (1st) | 36.6 (1st) |
| 2007-06-12 | 22 | 35.1 (1st) | 37.5 (1st) |
| 2007-06-18 | 23 | 33.7 (1st) | 36.0 (1st) |
| 2007-06-19 | 24 | 38.7 (1st) | 40.3 (1st) |
| Average | | 24.3% | 26.2% |

== Awards and nominations ==
| Year | Award | Category | Recipient | Result |
|---|---|---|---|---|
| 2007 | 1st Korea Drama Awards | Grand Prize (Daesang) | Kim Hee-ae | Won |
| 2007 | 1st Korea Drama Awards | Top Excellence Award, Actor | Kim Sang-joong | Won |
| 2007 | SBS Drama Awards | Grand Prize (Daesang) | Kim Hee-ae | Won |
| 2007 | SBS Drama Awards | Top Excellence Award, Actress | Bae Jong-ok | Nominated |
| 2007 | SBS Drama Awards | Top Excellence Award, Actress | Kim Hee-ae | Nominated |
| 2007 | SBS Drama Awards | Excellence Award, Actor in a Miniseries | Kim Sang-joong | Won |
| 2007 | SBS Drama Awards | Best Supporting Actress in a Miniseries | Ha Yoo-mi | Won |
| 2007 | SBS Drama Awards | Producer's Award | Bae Jong-ok | Won |
| 2007 | SBS Drama Awards | Top 10 Stars | Kim Hee-ae | Won |
| 2007 | SBS Drama Awards | Best Couple Award | Kim Byung-se and Ha Yoo-mi | Won |
| 2008 | 44th Baeksang Arts Awards | Best Drama | My Husband's Woman | Nominated |
| 2008 | 44th Baeksang Arts Awards | Best Actress (TV) | Kim Hee-ae | Nominated |
| 2008 | 44th Baeksang Arts Awards | Best Screenplay (TV) | Kim Soo-hyun | Nominated |

== Plagiarism allegations ==
Writer Kim Soo-hyun strongly denied the accusations of plagiarism by Ryu Gyeung-ok, who claimed that My Husband's Woman was very similar to her own TV drama That Woman, Ok-hui.
