= I Love Lee Taly =

2012 South Korean drama

- Promotional poster
- Also known as: I Love Italy
- Genre: Romance, Comedy
- Written by: Moon Ji-young
- Directed by: Kim Do-hyuk
- Starring: Park Ye-jin; Kim Ki-bum
- Country of origin: South Korea
- Original language: Korean
- No. of episodes: 16

Production
- Executive producers: Kim Jae-joong; Park Ji-young
- Producers: Lee Min-jin; Lee Sang-hee; Lee So-yoon
- Production location: Korea
- Running time: 60 minutes
- Production company: Movie Rock

Original release
- Network: TVN
- Release: May 28 – July 17, 2012

I Love Lee Taly (Korean: 아이러브 이태리; lit. 'I Love Lee Tae-ri') is a 2012 South Korean romantic comedy series about a 14-year-old boy who makes a wish and suddenly grows up into a 25-year-old man. It stars Super Junior member Kim Ki-bum and Park Ye-jin.

== Synopsis ==
14-year-old Geum Eun-dong (Kim Ki-bum) is in love with Lee Tae-ri (Park Ye-jin), a well-bred heiress who is seven years older than him. Eun-dong's wish is mysteriously granted when he wakes up to find he has become a handsome 25-year-old man — the perfect contender. As Tae-ri's new assistant, Hwang Min-soo, he learns of Tae-ri's heartbreak and discovers that not everything is as it seems in her picture-perfect life.

== Cast ==
=== Main ===
- Park Ye-jin as Lee Tae-ri
- Kim Ki-bum as Geum Eun-dong / Hwang Min-soo
  - Baek Su-ho as young Eun-dong
- Yang Jin-woo as Choi Seung-jae
- Jubi as Ha Soon-shim

=== Supporting ===
- Im Ho as Geum San
- Soy as Na Hong-shil
- Woo Sang-jun
- Kim Yong-hoon as Manager Moon
- Lee Moon-soo as college graduate Geum
- Jang Young-nam as Oh Mi-ja
- Jang Seo-won as Hwang Min-gook
- Jeon Yang-ja as Baek Soo-bok
- Choi Deok-moon as Tae-ri's uncle
- Seo Young-joo as Lee Soo-bin

== Original soundtrack ==
I Love Lee Taly (Original Soundtrack)

Soundtrack album by Various Artists
- Released: July 16, 2012
- Genre: Pop, K-pop, soundtrack, R&B, teen pop
- Label: CJ E&M Music

1. Do It – Sunny Hill
2. 사랑...안녕 (Love... Goodbye) – Jun. K (2PM)
3. 우리 사랑할까요 (Shall We Fall in Love?) – Ji-suk (Rainbow) & Min Hoon-ki
4. 이상해요 (It's Strange) – Son Ho-young
5. Rhapsodie Italienne
6. Neo Sonic Chiot courant
7. Swimming pool
8. Valse Italienne Amoureux de toi
9. Neo Sonic un chat sur la bicyclette blue
10. Neo Sonic Italian piece for orchestra in C minor
11. Neo Sonic La Nostalgie
12. Neo Sonic Je suis fou de toi
13. Love Theme for Italy
14. Love Poem
15. Neo Sonic beau moment d'amour
16. Je t'aime l'Italie!
17. Do It Piano version
18. 사랑... 안녕 (version orchstrale)
19. 우리 사랑할까요 (Bossa-nova version)
20. Clair de lune
