= Kim Soo-hyun (writer) =

South Korean screenwriter and novelist

- Born: Kim Soon-ok; January 27, 1943 (age 83); Cheongju, North Chungcheong Province, South Korea
- Other names: Kim Soo-hyeon; Kim Su-hyun
- Education: Korea University - Korean Language and Literature
- Occupations: Screenwriter, Novelist
- Years active: 1968-present

Korean name
- Hangul: 김순옥
- RR: Gim Sunok
- MR: Kim Sunok

Pen name
- Hangul: 김수현
- Hanja: 金秀賢
- RR: Gim Suhyeon
- MR: Kim Suhyŏn
- Website: http://www.kshdrama.com/

Kim Soo-hyun (born Kim Soon-ok on January 27, 1943) is a South Korean screenwriter and novelist.

== Career ==
Kim Soon-ok graduated from Korea University in 1965 with a degree in Korean Language and Literature. She was hired at MBC after winning their radio drama competition in 1968 with her radio play 그 해 겨울의 우화 ("The Fable of That Year's Winter"). Using the pen name Kim Soo-hyun, the first television drama she wrote, Rainbow, went on air in 1972.

Over four decades, Kim became one of the most renowned screenwriters in Korea. Her body of work includes some of the most watched shows in Korean television history, including What is Love (1992), Men of the Bath House (1996), and Trap of Youth (1999). In his book Korea Through TV Drama, author Kim Hwan-pyo describes how the streets became quiet around the airing time of Kim Soo-hyun's Love and Ambition (1987) as "practically everyone in the country" was at home in front of the TV.

Kim specializes in stories about Korean family life ― how traditional values conflict with the new and how women struggle to adjust to or resist cultural suppression at home and work. Her work tends to target an older audience, and she is also known for putting a spotlight on social issues rarely discussed by the public, making some of her work controversial.

=== 2007–present: Works ===
For My Husband's Woman (2007), a drama about a wife (played by Bae Jong-ok) who discovers her husband (Kim Sang-joong) is having an affair with her best friend (Kim Hee-ae), Kim infused her script with realism despite the provocative subject of adultery, saying that it reflects a society in which extra-marital affairs have become commonplace. Normally portrayed as a wicked woman, Kim humanized the mistress, saying, "If I chose between one of the two women and called it a victory, the script would have become didactic and banal. Each of the two take up 50 percent of my heart equally." It was the second highest-rated Korean drama of 2007 (next to Jumong), and won Kim Hee-ae the Grand Prize ("Daesang") at the 2007 SBS Drama Awards. Later, Kim Soo-hyun strongly denied accusations of plagiarism by Ryu Gyeung-ok, who claimed that My Husband's Woman was very similar to her own TV drama That Woman, Ok-hui.

In 2008's Mom's Dead Upset, a middle-aged woman rediscovers herself by taking a one-year break and declaring independence from her family after spending decades as a housewife looking after three children, a husband and a widowed father-in-law. Despite some viewers who called the character "irresponsible" and "self-centered" for deserting her family, the drama attracted record-breaking ratings, and lead actress Kim Hye-ja received the Grand Prize ("Daesang") at the 2008 KBS Drama Awards and the 2009 Baeksang Arts Awards. Kim said she wanted to "give a sabbatical year to all mothers," and wrote the drama to liberate mothers from their stereotypes.

Life Is Beautiful (2010) was the first network drama to feature an openly gay couple. Kim was both praised and panned for her openness in dealing with the subject of same-sex relationships, but she wrote without hesitation, saying, "I approached the issue of homosexuality as though it could have happened to my son." Actors Song Chang-eui and Lee Sang-woo later praised her for giving their characters subtle and detailed development. In emphasizing the love between two handsome and intellectual people, Kim said her goal was to eradicate prejudice toward gay couples and make homosexuality no longer a taboo subject. In a society that is still conservative when it comes to homosexuality, the high ratings showed that viewers were largely supportive of the drama, which was extended for 13 additional episodes. Openly gay actor Hong Seok-cheon recalled that after he came out in 2000, he was fired from all his acting and hosting jobs, until Kim hired him in a supporting role in the 2003 drama Perfect Love.

In A Thousand Days' Promise (2011), Kim explored the social problems associated with Alzheimer's disease, with Soo Ae giving an unsentimental portrait of a young woman slowly losing her memory and independence.

Childless Comfort (2012), about a single mother played by Uhm Ji-won, was a significant achievement when it became the highest rated Korean cable drama thus far, helping elevate struggling cable television network jTBC into becoming a true force in broadcasting. Its peak episode rating of 10.71% was an impressive number for pay-television standards because Korean cable channels rarely manage to touch 1 percent on most of their programs, whether they be dramas, sketch comedies, talk shows, documentaries and news. And at ₩100 million per episode, Kim was confirmed to be the highest-paid writer on Korean television.

=== Personality and controversy ===
Kim is also known for her fiery and outspoken personality. She is called by insiders as "a Godzilla" on set, for controlling actors' depictions of her characters. Famous for her intense but meaningful dialogue, ad-libbing is forbidden and actors are required to say their lines exactly as her script dictates, word-for-word, down to her trademark fast tempo. Kim admits that she's heard about actresses who cry in the bathroom because she forced them to act until she was satisfied.

When Kim Hee-ae, lead actress of Kim's Perfect Love, lost the Grand Prize ("Daesang") at the 2003 SBS Drama Awards, Kim was quoted as saying, "The prize which is not given to the right one is just trash." Kim Hee-ae later won the Grand Prize ("Daesang") at the 2004 Baeksang Arts Awards.

Production on the TV drama Snow Flower was delayed because Kim, who had written the novel it was based on and had casting approval, opposed the proposal to cast singer Lee Hyori in one of the major roles (Go Ara was eventually cast). Kim had previously adapted her same-titled novel, which portrays the affection and conflict between a mother and her only daughter, into the 1992 film Flower in Snow starring Yoon Jeong-hee and Lee Mi-yeon.

In 2010, she became involved in a public feud with director Im Sang-soo over the film The Housemaid. Kim had been hired to write the script for a remake of the 1960 classic, and after the director initially attached to it quit, Kim recommended Im to the producers. After Kim finished her script, Im made changes, reportedly to suit his provocative style, and Kim expressed her dissatisfaction, saying, "I was shocked when director Im returned the script to me. It was not edited but completely rewritten." Kim claimed that Im apologized and agreed to collaborate on the script, but instead took his version to the studio without consulting her. Enraged, Kim withdrew from the project and later posted on her blog, "I've been stabbed in the back by someone I trusted [and] have no mind to go on with my work."

Already in her sixties when she joined Twitter, Kim has lambasted the Hollywood film Avatar, and the variety show I Am a Singer, and declared that more than half of the current TV dramas are crude, "as if they were written by middle school students." When asked her opinion of makjang dramas, which use racy material including sex, betrayal and violence and have become increasingly available to the general viewing audience, she was firm in her response: "Many producers and writers point to the ratings or viewers as reasons why they are popular, but I think they are very irresponsible. People in the industry have a responsibility to maintain high standards for the viewers, not bring the bar down."

=== Critical assessment ===
Despite the continuing popularity of her dramas, some critics are beginning to say that Kim's recent works have been mere parodies of her old ones. She has also been criticized for heavy-handed dialogue, and her overly conservative depictions of the Korean family ― the families she writes about are often of the traditional variety, with grandparents living with the parents and the children. But her work ethic has been lauded in the industry, as one of the few drama writers who turn in their scripts on time. Kim also wrote Mom's Dead Upset while recovering from breast cancer surgery.

=== Views on writing ===
According to Kim, the secret to writing a successful drama is in writing not with your brain but with your heart. She said, "All the characters are basically an embodiment of me. I get inside each and every character and write about their lives. If this is done only with your head, the characters fail to come to life and viewers don't want to know any more about them." Selected as Korea's Leading Writer at the 2008 Seoul Drama Festival, Kim told the attendees, "There are over 1,000 members enrolled in the Korean TV and Radio Writers Association, but I doubt how many of them are real writers. If you want to be a good writer, forget about ratings or payment. If you are able to write a handsome drama, other things will follow naturally. I write dramas as I would create a work of art. I'll write dramas with such pride for the rest of my life." In 2012, she received the prestigious Eungwan Order of Cultural Merit.

== Filmography ==
=== Television ===
- Yeah, That's How It Is (SBS, 2016)
- Thrice Married Woman (SBS, 2013–2014)
- Childless Comfort (jTBC, 2012–2013)
- Daddy's Sorry (TV Chosun, 2012)
- A Thousand Days' Promise (SBS, 2011)
- Life Is Beautiful (SBS, 2010)
- Mom's Dead Upset (KBS2, 2008)
- My Husband's Woman (SBS, 2007)
- Love and Ambition (SBS, 2006)
- Precious Family (KBS2, 2004–2005)
- The Autumn of Major General Hong (SBS, 2004)
- Perfect Love (SBS, 2003)
- Wedding Gift (KBS2, 2003)
- Who's My Love (KBS2, 2002)
- The Aspen Tree (SBS, 2000)
- Fireworks (SBS, 2000–2002)
- Do You Know Your Son (SBS, 1999)
- Trap of Youth (SBS, 1999)
- Because I Love You (SBS, 1997–1998)
- Men of the Bath House (KBS2, 1995–1996)
- Life (SBS, 1995)
- Farewell (SBS, 1994)
- Living (SBS, 1993)
- Where is Ghana (SBS, 1992)
- Two Women (MBC, 1992)
- What is Love (MBC, 1991–1992)
- Betrayal of the Rose (MBC, 1990)
- Sand Castle (MBC, 1988)
- Love and Ambition (MBC, 1987)
- Love and Truth (MBC, 1984–1985)
- I'm Back (MBC, 1983)
- Daughter's Smile (KBS, 1983)
- Yesterday and Tomorrow (MBC, 1982–1983)
- Father (MBC, 1982)
- Nocturne (MBC, 1981–1982)
- Let Us Love (MBC, 1981–1982)
- The Confines of Love (MBC, 1981)
- Annyeong haseyo (Hello) (MBC, 1981)
- First Guest (MBC, 1981)
- Back in the Day (KBS, 1981)
- Ahrong-yi Darong-yi (TBC, 1980)
- The Lost Winter (TBC, 1980)
- A Lonely Affair (TBC, 1979–1980)
- Mom, I Like Dad (MBC, 1979)
- I Sell Happiness (MBC, 1978–1979)
- The Happiness of an Unhappy Woman (TBC, 1978)
- Trap of Youth (MBC, 1978)
- I Regret It (MBC, 1977–1978)
- Mal-hee (KBS, 1977)
- You (MBC, 1977–1978)
- Ordinary Woman (TBC, 1976)
- Girl's High School Days (MBC, 1976–1977)
- Bride Diary (MBC, 1975–1976)
- Annyeong (Hi) (MBC, 1975)
- Narcissus (MBC, 1974)
- Gangnam Family (MBC, 1974)
- New Mom (MBC, 1972–1973)
- Rainbow (MBC, 1972)

=== Film ===
- Forgive Me Once Again Despite Hatred (2002)
- Flower in Snow (1992)
- Mother (1985)
- Lost Youth (1982)
- The Swamp of Desire (1982)
- As a Woman (1980)
- You Are My Destiny (1980)
- The Trappings of Youth (1979)
- The Man I Left (1979)
- The Last Winter (1978)
- The Woman I Betrayed (1978)
- The Kept Woman (1976)
- I Confess (1976)
- Tonight Forever (1972)
- I Will Give It All (1972)
- A Guilty Woman (1971)
- Once More, for Love (Final Episode) (1971)
- Pilnyeo (1970)
- Dance with My Father (1970)
- Farewell My Love (Part Three) (1970)
- Though There was No Vow (1970)
- Deer in the Snow Field (1969)
- Forgotten Woman (1969)

== Novels ==
- Flower in Snow (1992)
- Wound (1989)
- Sand Castle (1989)
- That Last Winter (1988)
- Temptation (1982)
- The Carriage Running into the Winter (1981)
- The Last Secret Affair (1980)
- The Man I Left (1979)
- The Trappings of Youth (1979)
- Happiness of an Unhappy Woman (1979)
- Wound (1978)
- Though There was No Vow (1970)

== Awards ==
- 2008 Seoul Drama Festival: Korea's Leading Writer
- 2005 KBS Drama Awards: Best Writer (Precious Family)
- 2005 Korean TV and Radio Writers Association: Best Writer (Precious Family)
- 2005 Korea Broadcasting Awards: Best Writer (Precious Family)
- 2001 37th Baeksang Arts Awards: Best TV Screenplay (The Aspen Tree)
- 1981 17th Baeksang Arts Awards: Best TV Screenplay (Back in the Day)
- 1980 16th Baeksang Arts Awards: Best TV Screenplay (A Lonely Affair)
- 1973 1st Korea Broadcasting Awards: Best Writer (New Mom)
- 1971 8th Blue Dragon Film Awards: Best Screenplay (Pilnyeo)

=== Listicles ===
Name of publisher, year listed, name of listicle, and placement
| Publisher | Year | Listicle | Placement | Ref. |
|---|---|---|---|---|
| The Herald Economy | 2008 | Pop Culture Power Leader Big 30 | 6th | |
| The Herald Economy | 2011 | Pop Culture Power Leader Big 30 | 15th | |
| The Herald Economy | 2012 | Pop Culture Power Leader Big 30 | 15th | |
| KBS | 2023 | The 50 people who made KBS shine | 10th | |
