= Precious Family =

- Also known as: Letters to My Parents; Dear Parents
- Written by: Kim Soo-hyun
- Directed by: Jung Eul-young
- Starring: Kim Hee-ae; Huh Joon-ho; Song Jae-ho; Kim Hae-sook
- Country of origin: South Korea
- Original language: Korean
- No. of episodes: 68

Production
- Producer: Jung Sung-hyo
- Running time: 60 minutes on Saturdays and Sundays at 19:55
- Production company: Samhwa Networks

Original release
- Network: Korean Broadcasting System
- Release: October 16, 2004 – July 5, 2005

Precious Family (Korean: 부모님 전상서; RR: Bumonim jeonsangseo; lit. 'Letters to My Parents') is a South Korean television series starring Kim Hee-ae, Huh Joon-ho, Song Jae-ho, Kim Hae-sook, Jang Hyun-sung, Lee Dong-wook, and Lee Yu-ri. It aired on KBS2 from October 16, 2004 to July 5, 2005 on Saturdays and Sundays at 19:55 for 68 episodes.

Shedding light on the importance of family and marriage through the realistic portrayal of one woman who experiences many trials in her life including her husband's infidelity, friction with difficult in-laws, and the hardship of raising an autistic son, the drama received solid ratings and critical approval.

== Plot ==
The insurmountable responsibility cast upon parents with mentally challenged offspring can be quite daunting. For Chang-soo (Huh Joon-ho), father of a young daughter and an autistic son (Yoo Seung-ho), the pressure was too much. He ends up cheating on his wife Sung-shil (Kim Hee-ae) with another woman, and eventually the two split up. Despite feeling society's double standards where the responsibility of childcare often falls on the mother's shoulders, Sung-shil re-enters the workforce.

Meanwhile, the bitterness of divorce soon brings Chang-soo to realize the preciousness of family and his love for his two children. Full of regrets and desire for redemption, Chang-soo approaches Sung-shil in hopes of rekindling their love. Just then, Chang-soo faces another fallback in his life as his company nears bankruptcy. The decision is now up to Sung-shil—she must decide whether to turn her back on the man who once stabbed her in the heart, or to embrace the changed man that he has become over the years.

== Cast ==
- Song Jae-ho as Ahn Jae-hyo
- Kim Hae-sook as Kim Ok-hwa
- Kim Hee-ae as Ahn Sung-shil
- Jang Hyun-sung as Ahn Ji-hwan
- Lee Dong-wook as Ahn Jung-hwan
- Lee Yu-ri as Ahn Sung-mi
- Kim Bo-yeon as Ahn Geum-joo
- Huh Joon-ho as Park Chang-soo
- Park Ji-mi as Park Soo-a h
- Yoo Seung-ho as Park Joon-yi
- Lee Chan as Jung-hwan's sidekick
- Jung Joon as Lee Hyung-pyo
- Song Seon-mi as Song Ah-ri
- Lee Min-young as Woo Mi-yeon
- Kim Yong-gun as Mi-yeon's father, taxi driver
- Kim Dong-joo as Mi-yeon's mom, runs a restaurant
- Bang Eun-hee as Myung-sook
- Jung Wook as Ah-ri's father
- Na Moon-hee
- Choi Si-won
