= Kim Ki-bum =

South Korean musician and actor

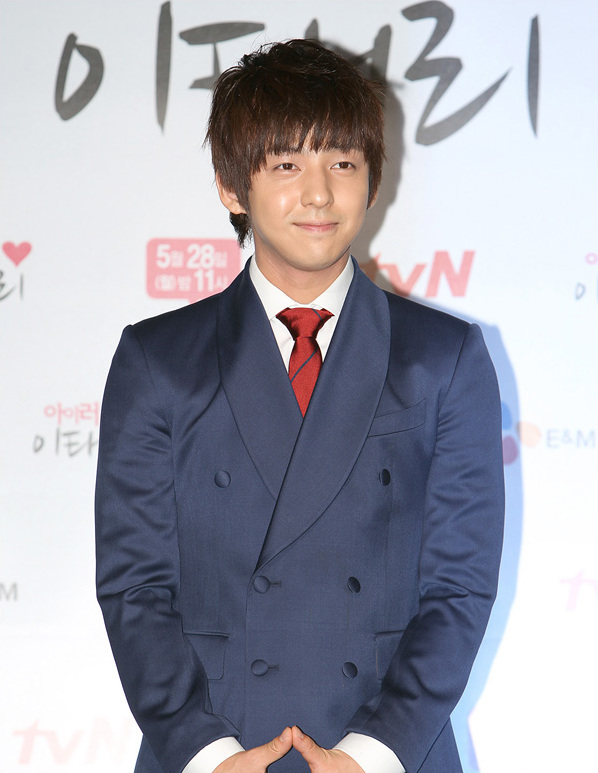
- Kim in 2012
- Born: August 21, 1987 (age 39); Seoul, South Korea
- Occupations: Actor; singer
- Years active: 2004–2022
- Agent: PA Entertainment
- Musical career
- Genre: K-pop
- Instrument: Vocal
- Years active: 2005–2009
- Label: SM
- Formerly of: Super Junior; SM Town

Korean name
- Hangul: 김기범
- Hanja: 金起範
- RR: Gim Gibeom
- MR: Kim Kibŏm

Kim Ki-bum (born August 21, 1987), known mononymously as Kibum, is a South Korean actor, former singer and rapper. Kim debuted in 2005 as a member of Super Junior and after the release of Super Junior's third studio album Sorry, Sorry in 2009, Kim halted his activities with the group due to his acting career. In 2015, Kim ended his contract with SM and officially departed from the group after halting his activities since 2009.

Kim made his television debut in the Korean television drama, April Kiss, in 2004.

== Life and career ==
=== 1987–2005: Early life and career beginnings ===
Kim was born in Seoul, South Korea. He has a younger sister, Kim Sae-hee, who lives with his mother. One of his cousin is an actor and model, Shin Dong-wook. At the age of ten, he moved to Los Angeles, California, United States where he attended Santa Monica High School. In 2002, he was discovered by a talent agent from South Korea and was recommended to audition for the Starlight Casting System by SM Entertainment. Kim signed a contract with SM Entertainment and became an official trainee, being trained in areas of singing, acting, dancing, and other performing talents such as hosting and modeling. Although he resided in Seoul at the time, he constantly returned to Los Angeles to visit his family and to attend short school sessions.

Kim debuted as an actor on April 21, 2004, in KBS drama April Kiss as young Han Jung Woo. This was followed in March 2005, with Joo Yeo Myeong in another KBS drama, Sharp 2, co-starring labelmates Go Ara and Heechul. In November 2005, he played a small role in the MBC drama, Marrying a Millionaire, appearing in one episode where he plays the young Kim Younghoon.

=== 2005–09: Debut with Super Junior and solo activities ===
Kim debut as part of 12-member rotational project group Super Junior 05 on November 6, 2005, on SBS's music programme Popular Songs, performing their first single, "TWINS (Knock Out)". Their debut album SuperJunior05 (Twins) was released a month later on December 5, 2005, and debuted at No. 3 on the monthly MIAK K-pop album charts.

In 2006, he took on the lead role in the MBC daily sitcom, Rainbow Romance, sharing the lead with Kim Heechul for 243 episodes. This was followed by Kim's second drama with Go Ara, Snow Flower in November on SBS. In March 2006, SM Entertainment began to recruit new members for the next Super Junior generation. However, plans changed and the company declared a halt in forming future Super Junior generations. Following the addition of thirteenth member Kyuhyun, the group dropped the suffix "05" and became officially credited as Super Junior. The re-polished group's first CD single "U" was released on June 7, 2006, which was their most successful single until the release of "Sorry, Sorry" in March 2009.

He appeared in Attack on the Pin-Up Boys, a 2007 high school Korean film that starred all members of Super Junior except Kyuhyun. He plays the narrator of the story; a student who investigates the mysterious happenings at school.

In April 2008, Kim returned to acting after 16 months, starring in another daily MBC drama, Chunja's Happy Events alongside Wang Bitna. He was picked as the co-presenter of Thailand's 12 Plus Powder along with the primary presenter, bandmate Choi Siwon, in early 2008. However, the co-presenter was switched to bandmate Donghae for another product of 12 Plus – "roll-on".

In 2009 when Super Junior released their third album, Sorry, Sorry, Kim was absent during promotions for the first single, "Sorry, Sorry", leading to speculation that he left Super Junior, which was denied by both SM Entertainment and band members. When Super Junior released their second single, "It's You", Kim had no singing solo and was again absent from all promotions. SM finally issued a statement stating that Kim was busy with solo projects, and re-confirmed he would be absent from promotional activities, but that he had not left Super Junior. Even though he is featured in promotional material for their concert tour Super Show 2 Tour, Kim did not take part due to an injury to his foot requiring six weeks of rest. After the release of "Sorry, Sorry – Answer", Kim who was absent from the music video, stated "Firstly, I am in the process of preparing for the play and releasing the drama. Whether I will participate in the fourth album, resume solo activities, or continue acting, need to be further discussed with my company".

=== 2010–15: Acting career and departure from SM Entertainment ===
In 2010, Kim starred in his second film Jumunjin, released on the January 21. It is a love story of a ghost man (Kim) and a girl that lives in the country side. From January 26 to March 28, Kim starred in theatrical play A Nap, at Baekam Art Hall in Samseong-dong, Seoul. He played a young version of male lead Young-jin with Lee Joo-seung. The play is based on a short story of the same name by Park Min-gyu and directed by filmmaker Hur Jin-ho. In May 2010 it was confirmed that Kim would neither participate in the fourth album, Bonamana, nor any further Super Junior activities until further notice, as he would be focusing on his acting career.

In October 2011 Kim played Joseon scholar-official Pak Paengnyeon in historical drama Deep Rooted Tree.

In May 2012, Kim will star as the male lead Geum Eun-dong in I Love Lee Tae-ri, where he plays a 14-year-old middle school student who goes to a performance of his favorite singer and becomes a man in his 20s, who is the secretary of a haughty heiress, Lee Tae-ri, played by Park Ye-jin.

Kim will star as Duan Yu in the 2013 Chinese television drama, The Demi-Gods and Semi-Devils and the title character in 2014 Chinese television drama, Lucky Tianbao.

On August 18, 2015, Kibum announced via his personal SNS that his contract with SM Entertainment had ended.

=== 2016–2022: Return to acting and taking up variety ===
In 2017 Kibum starred in the Chinese film My Kitchen Lover, released on August 25.

On June 25, 2018, Kibum as an actor signed with Clover Company.

Kibum was confirmed on Nov 8 to be in the new SBS Plus variety show Two Feet Life.

In 2020, Kibum starred in his own YouTube Channel, "Yangban Kim Kibum". Since his departure from Clover Company, the channel has ceased producing new content.

On January 13, 2022, it confirmed that Kibum left from Clover Company and signed an exclusive contract with PA Entertainment and plans to accelerate his acting activities in the future, starting with fan meetings in March 2022.

On May 2, 2022, Kim terminated his contract with PA Entertainment.

== Discography ==
- 2006: "Can It Be Love?" – Nonstop OST

== Filmography ==
=== Film ===
Year	Title	Role	Ref.
2007	Attack on the Pin-Up Boys	Kibum/Narrator	
2010	Jumunjin	Ghost	
2016	Operation Chromite	Kwak Tae-Duk	
2017	My Kitchen Lover	Wind	
2022	Girls in the Cage		

=== Television series ===
Year	Title	Role	Ref.
2004	April Kiss	Young Han Jung-woo	
2005	Rainbow Romance	Kim Ki-bum	
2005	Marrying a Millionaire	Young Kim Young-hoon	
2005	Sharp 2	Joo Yuh-myoung	
2006	Snow Flower	Ha Yeong-chan	
2008	Chunja's Special Day	Park Jung-woo	
2011	Deep Rooted Tree	Pak Paeng-nyeon	
2012	I Love Lee Taly	Geum Eun-dong	
2013–2014	The Demi-Gods and Semi-Devils	Duan Yu	
2016	Lucky Tianbao	Zhu Tian Bao	

=== Television show ===
Year	Title	Role	Notes	Ref.
2018	Two Feet Life	Cast		
2020	Yangban Kim Kibum	Host		
2021	King of Mask Singer	Contestant	as "Kicking Cha" (episode 291)	

=== Music video appearances ===
Year	Song title	Artist(s)	Ref.
2006	"Passion (My Everything)"	The Grace	

== Theater ==
Year	Title	Notes	Ref.
2010	A Nap	Baekam Art Hall	
