= Dead Man (2024 film) =

2024 film by Ha Joon-won

- Theatrical release poster
- Hangul: 데드맨
- RR: Dedeumaen
- MR: Tedŭmaen
- Directed by: Ha Joon-won
- Written by: Ha Joon-won
- Starring: Cho Jin-woong; Kim Hee-ae; Lee Soo-kyung
- Cinematography: Kim Dong-young
- Edited by: Han Mi-yeon
- Music by: Mowg
- Production companies: Palette Pictures; Saram Entertainment; Wavve
- Distributed by: Megabox Plus M
- Release date: February 7, 2024
- Running time: 109 minutes
- Country: South Korea
- Language: Korean
- Box office: US$1.7 million

Dead Man (Korean: 데드맨) is a 2024 South Korean crime thriller film written and directed by Ha Joon-won in his feature film directorial debut. It stars Cho Jin-woong, Kim Hee-ae, and Lee Soo-kyung. The film was released on February 7, 2024.

== Premise ==
The film dives into the underworld of figurehead CEOs, individuals who rent out their names to front companies. It follows Lee Man-jae, the ace of this shady industry, who is falsely accused of embezzling ₩100 billion and sold into an illegal prison in China after being used in a corporate scam tactic. Presumed dead, he returns to trace those who exploited his name and reclaim his stolen identity and life.

== Cast ==
- Cho Jin-woong as Lee Man-jae
- Kim Hee-ae as Mrs. Shim (Shim Eun-jo)
- Lee Soo-kyung as Gong Hee-joo
- Choi Soo-young as Hipster
- Choi Jae-woong as Representative Hwang
- Park Ho-san as Jo Pil-joo
- Kim Won-hae as Gong Moon-sik
- Lee Si-hoon as Broker
- Jeon Moo-song as Jin
- Jung Woon-sun as Jeon Soo-hyeon
- Yoo Yeon-soo as Yoon Seong-su

== Production ==
=== Development ===
Dead Man marks the directorial debut of Ha Joon-won, previously known for co-writing Bong Joon-ho's The Host (2006). Ha spent five years conducting extensive research into real-life name leasing and identity fraud. His investigation included interviews with figurehead CEOs, individuals who remain hidden in plain sight while fronting shell companies for illicit gain.

=== Filming ===
Principal photography began in November 2021 and ended in February 2022.

== Reception ==
According to the Korean Film Council's integrated computer network, Dead Man has grossed $1.7 million at the local box office with a running total of 237,563 tickets sold.
