= Kim Hee-ae =

South Korean actress (born 1967)

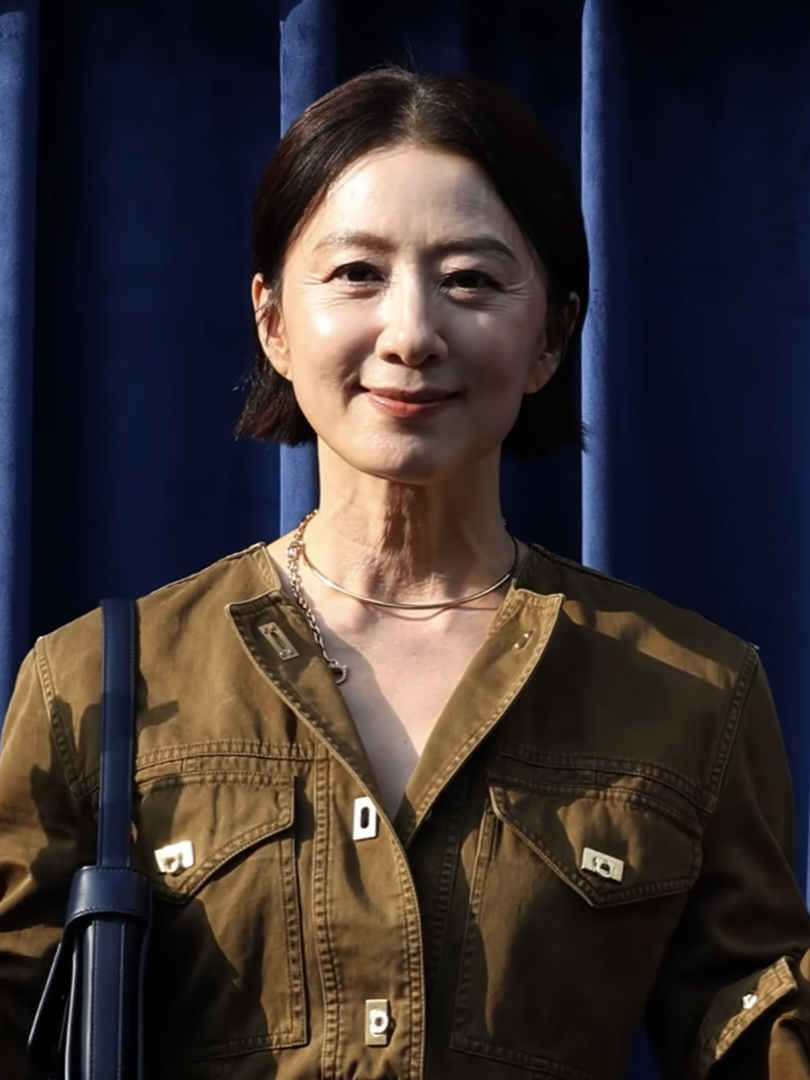
- Kim in August 2026
- Born: April 23, 1967 (age 59); Jeju Province, South Korea
- Education: Chung-Ang University (B.A. in Theater and Film, M.A. in Communication and Journalism)
- Occupation: Actress
- Years active: 1982–present
- Agent: KeyEast
- Spouse: Lee Chan-jin (m. 1996)
- Children: 2

Korean name
- Hangul: 김희애
- Hanja: 金喜愛
- RR: Gim Huiae
- MR: Kim Hŭiae

Kim Hee-ae (Korean: 김희애; born April 23, 1967) is a South Korean actress. She is best known for her leading roles in Korean dramas such as Sons and Daughters (1992), Perfect Love (2003), My Husband's Woman (2007), How Long I've Kissed (2012), Secret Affair (2014), and The World of the Married (2020). She has received multiple acting awards including two Daesang (Grand Prize) and four Best Actress Awards for Television at the Baeksang Arts Awards. In 2020, she was selected as Gallup Korea's Television Actor of the Year.

== Early life ==
Kim Hee-ae was born in Seoul. Her father is from Hallim, Jeju City, Jeju Island. Kim was a freshman at Hyehwa Girls' High School when she was discovered by the younger sister of one of her teachers while visiting the school. This led to her first modeling job in a commercial for a school uniform brand in 1982, which marked her entertainment debut. She also appeared in Cheil Industries commercials that same year.

== Career ==
=== 1983–2003: Acting debut and stardom ===
In 1983, Kim made her acting debut in a small role in the film The First Day of the Twentieth Year. In March 1985, she became an exclusive model for Hankook Cosmetics. Her full-fledged acting career began in 1985, after graduating from high school. After entering the Department of Theater and Film at Chung-Ang University, she starred in films such as My Love Jjanggu and Memories of Fire. Later that year, she took on leading roles in MBC Bestseller Theater - Unknowable Things and KBS Hometown of Legends, though she remained primarily known as a commercial model.

In 1986, while still a sophomore at college, she landed her first starring role in a television drama on KBS 1TV's daily drama A Woman's Heart. This was the first full-length daily drama planned by KBS since the previous year as a follow-up to Eunbit Yeoul. Industry officials noted that she was selected after beating out over 200 candidates due to her rich facial expressions and excellent acting ability demonstrated in Bestseller Theater. In the drama, she portrayed Song Da-young, a Korean woman who navigated the turbulent post-liberation era while prioritizing her devotion as a mother over her own needs.

Following A Woman's Heart, Kim focused on television dramas and emerged as a leading star of the early 1990s alongside contemporaries Chae Shi-ra and Choi Jin-sil. Among her most significant projects from this period were Beyond the Mountains (1991) and Sons and Daughters (1992), the latter of which earned her the Daesang (Grand Prize) at both the MBC Drama Awards and the 29th Baeksang Arts Awards. She also made an impact in cinema, achieving commercial success with The 101st Proposal (1993), a Korean adaptation of the Japanese television series of the same name, which garnered her Best Actress nominations at the 14th Blue Dragon Film Awards and the 32nd Grand Bell Awards.

In 1994, Kim took on the starring role in the MBC Monday-Tuesday drama Kareisky, which ran from December 19, 1994, to March 7, 1995. Written by Lee Sang-hyeon, the series anchored its narrative around Kim as Seong Nam-yeong, the central character whose journey drives the story. Her character searches for her lover, Yoon Sang-gyu, who fled to the Soviet Union due to unavoidable circumstances, while portraying the severe hardships faced after the family was forced to relocate to Central Asia. Adopting the Russian name Galina in later episodes, Kim's character ultimately became a maternal figure to Yoon's children following the death of their mother, culminating in a final scene where an aged Nam-yeong reunites with Yoon. For this performance, Kim received a Best Actress (TV) nomination at the 31st Baeksang Arts Awards in 1995.

Kim subsequently starred in the television series Love and Marriage, written by Kim Ji-soo and featuring an ensemble cast that included Kim alongside Kim Hye-soo and Lee Young-ae. Her performance earned her a nomination for Top Excellence Award for Actress at the 1995 MBC Drama Awards, followed by a win for Best Performer in the TV Actress category at the 8th Korea Broadcasting Producer Awards in 1996. Following her marriage that same year, she entered a three-and-a-half-year hiatus from acting.

She made her entertainment industry comeback in April 1999 with the MBC daily drama Only One You, after which she suspended her acting career once again.

=== 2003–2009: Hit dramas ===
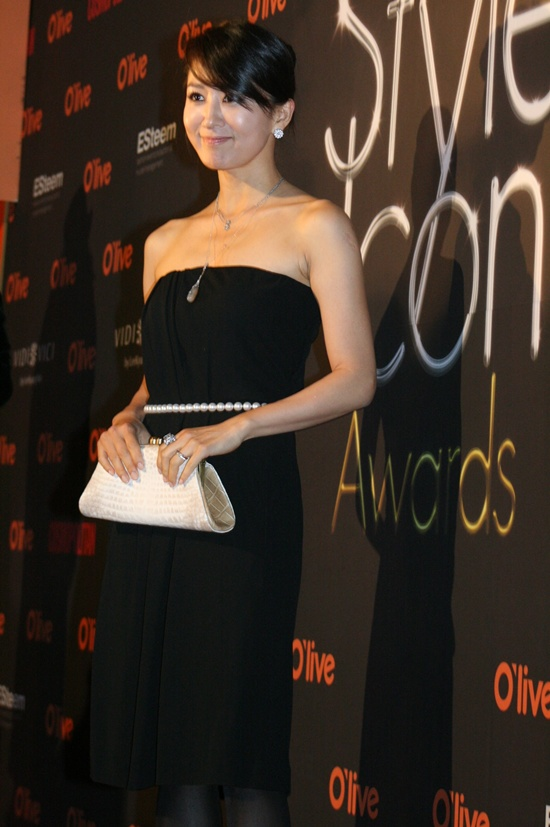
Kim at the Style Icon Awards in October 2008

Following her hiatus, Kim drew widespread praise in 2003 for two consecutive hit dramas. In Wife, she played a woman whose husband vanishes and reappears years later as an amnesiac with a new family, earning her the Best Actress award at the 39th Baeksang Arts Awards. This was followed by renowned screenwriter Kim Soo-hyun's dramas Perfect Love, where her portrayal of a devoted wife and mother diagnosed with a terminal illness won her another Daesang at the 40th Baeksang Arts Awards. She worked again with Kim a year later in Precious Family (also known as Letters to My Parents), playing a woman who marries into a rich family who treats her badly after she gives birth to a baby with autism. Kim next starred in the melodrama Snow Flower.

Her third collaboration with Kim Soo-hyun was 2007's My Husband's Woman, but unlike her previous saintly characters, this time she was cast against type as a sexy, worldly woman having an affair with her best friend's husband. The adultery drama was a hit with a peak viewership rating of 38.7%, and Kim yet again won the Daesang at the Korea Drama Awards and the SBS Drama Awards.

=== 2010–2012: Hiatus, Midas, and Sister Over Flowers ===
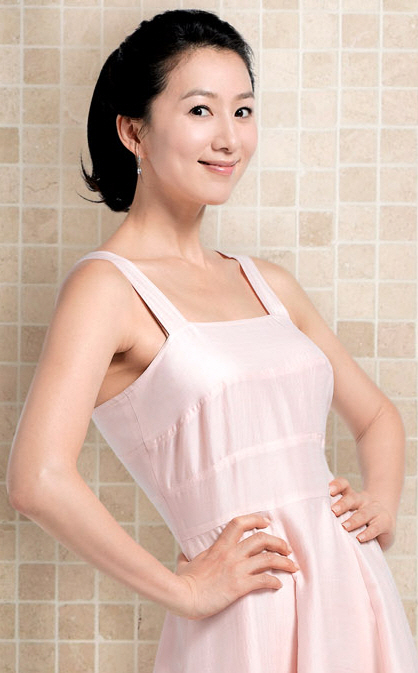
Kim for LG in 2011

Afterwards, Kim went on a brief hiatus, during which she continued to appear in commercials and magazines, gaining a reputation as a style icon by inspiring middle-aged Korean women to embrace younger and edgier fashion trends.

Kim returned to acting four years later with Midas, starring as a wealthy chaebol heiress who fosters greed and ambition in a young lawyer. She then won Best Actress at the 49th Baeksang Arts Awards for her portrayal of a housewife increasingly stifled by her husband's obsession with status, who finds herself falling for her son's dentist in How Long I've Kissed, one of the inaugural dramas of the new cable channel JTBC in 2012.

The year 2013 marked Kim's first regular appearance in a reality show with Sisters Over Flowers, created by director Na Yeong-seok and screenwriter Lee Woo-jung as a spin-off of Grandpas Over Flowers. In the program, she joined Youn Yuh-jung, Kim Ja-ok, Lee Mi-yeon and Lee Seung-gi go on a backpacker tourism trip around Croatia and Turkey.

=== 2014–2019: Return to the big screen and continued success ===
In 2014, Kim returned to the big screen after a 21-year absence in Thread of Lies, a film adaptation of Kim Ryeo-ryeong's novel Elegant Lies about teen bullying which leads to a young girl's suicide. Kim said she accepted the project because the script was "faultless" and she felt empathy for the characters, and one review described her performance as "excellent as the grieving mother [...] understated but somehow believable, touching and honest." For this role, Kim earned her Best Actress nominations at both the 35th Blue Dragon Film Awards and the 50th Baeksang Arts Awards.

That same year, Kim reunited with the writer and director of How Long I've Kissed in Secret Affair, about an art foundation director who embarks on a passionate affair with a poor but talented pianist 20 years her junior. Her acclaimed performance earned her multiple accolades, including the Top Excellence Award for Actress in a Miniseries at the 3rd APAN Star Awards and Best Actress at the 9th Seoul International Drama Awards, along with a nomination for Top Excellence Award for Actress at the 7th Korea Drama Awards.

She next played the muse of real-life folk music group Twin Folio in the 2015 film C'est Si Bon, named after a music lounge located in Myeong-dong which was famous in the 1970s and 1980s for its live performances. She returned to the small screen with the police procedural drama Mrs. Cop, playing a violent crime detective who struggles to become a good mother. In 2016, Kim signed with YG Entertainment. The same year, she starred in the family melodrama Second to Last Love.

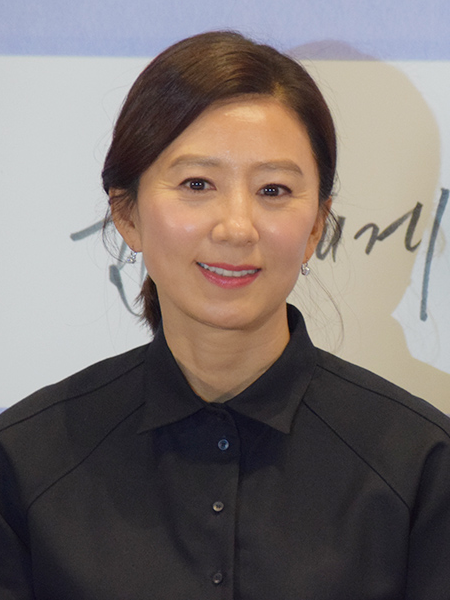
Kim at the Moonlit Winter premiere in November 2019

In 2018, Kim returned to the big screen, with two films. Her first one starring was the psychological thriller The Vanished. Kim starred as Moon Jung-sook in the drama film Herstory, based on the real story of comfort women. It also featured Kim Hae-sook, Ye Soo-jung, Moon Sook, and Lee Yong-nyeo as her costars. For her powerful performance in Herstory, Kim Hee-ae received several accolades, including the Best Actress award at the 27th Buil Film Awards, the Actress of the Year at the 6th Marie Claire Asia Star Awards, and Best Actress at the 2nd Korea China International Film Festival.

In 2019 Kim starred in Lim Dae-hyung's film Moonlit Winter. She played Yoon-hee, a divorced mother whose hidden past resurfaces when her daughter, Sae-bom, finds an old love letter from Jun, a friend from her high school days in Japan. Sae-bom, secretly arranged a trip to Otaru, hoping she'd reconnect with Jun. The film won Best Director and Best Screenplay for Lim Dae-hyung at the 41st Blue Dragon Film Awards, and Kim was honored with Best Actress at the 7th Korean Film Producers Association Awards.

=== 2020–2024: Career resurgence ===
In 2020, Kim starred in the JTBC drama The World of the Married, an adaptation of the BBC One series Doctor Foster. In the series, Kim Hee-ae portrayed Ji Sun-woo, a successful doctor whose seemingly perfect life unravels after she discovers her husband's affair, leading to a complex and intense narrative of betrayal and revenge. Her powerful performance as Ji Sun-woo garnered significant critical praise, and for this role, she won the Best Actress award at the 56th Baeksang Arts Awards and Grand Prize in APAN Star Awards.

Kim features in the 2023 film A Normal Family, directed by Hur Jin-ho and also starring Sul Kyung-gu, Jang Dong-gun, and Claudia Kim. Based on Herman Koch's novel The Dinner, the suspenseful drama centers on two wealthy families who convene over dinner to decide how to handle a violent crime committed by their children. Kim portrays Yeon-kyung, a mother grappling with the moral dilemma. The film has gained international recognition, being invited to numerous prestigious festivals including the Gala Presentation section of the 48th Toronto International Film Festival in September 2023, and has also been screened at the Udine Far East Film Festival, London Korean Film Festival, and Palm Springs International Film Festival, among others.

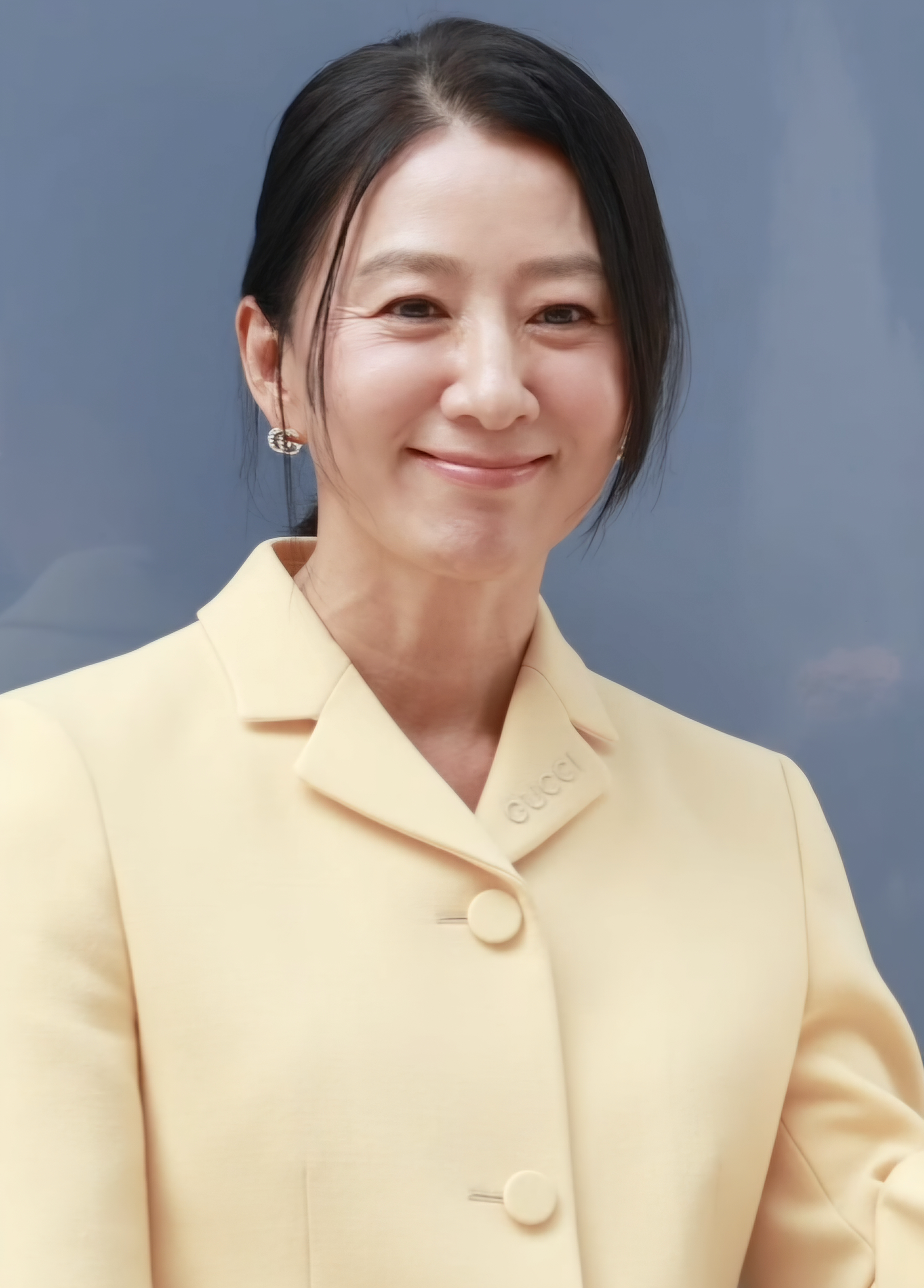
Kim in 2024

Kim returns to small screen with two Netflix political dramas: Queenmaker and The Whirlwind. In the 2023 Netflix series Queenmaker, she portrayed Hwang Do-hee, a brilliant image-maker who leaves her corporate role to help human rights lawyer Oh Kyung-sook (Moon So-ri) become the mayor of Seoul, navigating the cutthroat world of political campaigns. She then reunited with veteran actor Sul Kyung-gu in the 2024 Netflix political thriller The Whirlwind. In the series Kim Hee-ae plays Jeong Su-jin, the Deputy Prime Minister for Economic Affairs, who finds herself in a fierce political clash with Prime Minister Park Dong-ho (Sul Kyung-gu) after he attempts to assassinate a corrupt president. The series delves into intense power struggles and the dark side of politics, showcasing a compelling dynamic between the two lead characters.

Kim starred as the astute political consultant Shim Yeo-sa in the 2024 Ha Joon-won's crime thriller film Dead Man. The film follows Lee Man-jae (Cho Jin-woong), falsely imprisoned as a "dead man" for embezzlement, who seeks to reclaim his identity upon his return. Shim Yeo-sa approaches him with a cryptic offer. Kim's portrayal of the powerful and manipulative figure has been highly praised, with director Bong Joon-ho specifically commending her charisma and sharp eyes in the role.

=== 2025–present: Agency change and return to variety programming ===
In March 2025, Kim left YG Entertainment and signed with new agency KeyEast. Kim Hee-ae and Cha Seung-won were announced as cast members for Coupang Play's Bonjour Bakery on February 13, 2026, with the final lineup confirmed on April 2. The cast is divided into two teams: the Hall Team features Kim as café manager and Kim Seon-ho as barista, both receiving professional beverage training prior to filming, while the Kitchen Team consists of pâtissier Cha Seung-won and assistant Lee Ki-taek. The show aired on Coupang Play from May 8 to June 29 and began rebroadcasting on KBS2 on August 5, marking the first time KBS has broadcast original OTT platform content.

== Personal life ==
=== Religion ===
Kim is a Roman Catholic, and her baptismal name is Maria. She was one of fifty Catholic celebrities who appeared in the 2014 music video for the digital single "Koinonia" to commemorate Pope Francis' visit in South Korea, which marked the first papal visit in Asia in nineteen years.

=== Marriage and family ===
Kim married Lee Chan-jin, CEO of the web portal DreamWiz, in 1996, and the couple has two sons.

== Filmography ==
=== Film ===
Film
Year	Title	Role	Ref.
1983	The First Day of the Twentieth Year		
1985	Reminiscent Flame		
1985	My Love Jjang-gu	Mi-hye	
1987	The Hero Comes Back	Young-mi	
1993	The 101st Proposition	Jung-won	
2014	Thread of Lies	Yoo Hyun-sook	
2015	C'est Si Bon	Min Ja-young (40s)	
2018	The Vanished	Yoon Seol-hee	
2018	Herstory	Moon Jeong-sook	
2019	Moonlit Winter	Yoon-hee	
2023	The Moon	Yoon Moon-young	
2023	A Normal Family	Yeon-kyung	
2024	Dead Man	Mrs. Shim	

=== Television series ===
Television series
Year	Title	Role	Ref.
1986	A Woman's Heart	Song Da-young	
1987	Mother		
1987	Terms of Endearment	Kim Won-mi	
1988	Forget Tomorrow	Seo In-ae	
1989	Your Toast	Jeon Yeo-ok	
1990	What Do Women Want	Cha Young-gun	
1990	Winter Wanderer	Da-hye	
1990	500 Years of Joseon: Daewongun	Empress Myeongseong	
1990	I'm Still Loving You	Wan-joo	
1991	The Beginning of the End	Jung Hye-jung	
1991	Beyond the Mountains	Kang Myung-ae	
1992	Namok	Kyung-ah	
1992	The Kingdom of Anger	Min Jae-kyung	
1992	Sons and Daughters	Lee Hoo-nam	
1993	The Stormy Season	Lee Hong-joo	
1994	Kareisky	Sung Nam-young	
1995	Love and Marriage	Yoon Soo-bin	
1995	Love Formula	Choi Jeong-hee	
1999	You're One-of-a-Kind	Jang Seo-young	
2003	Wife	Kim Na-young	
2003	Perfect Love	Ha Young-ae	
2004	Precious Family	Ahn Sung-sil	
2006	Snow Flower	Lee Kang-ae	
2007	My Husband's Woman	Lee Hwa-young	
2011	Midas	Yoo In-hye	
2012	How Long I've Kissed	Yoon Seo-rae	
2014	Secret Affair	Oh Hye-won	
2015	Mrs. Cop	Choi Young-jin	
2016	Second to Last Love	Kang Min-joo	
2020	The World of the Married	Ji Sun-woo	
2023	Queenmaker	Hwang Do-hee	
2024	The Whirlwind	Jeong Su-jin	

=== Television shows ===
Television shows
Year	Title	Role	Notes	Ref.
2013	Sisters Over Flowers	Cast Member	with Youn Yuh-jung, Kim Ja-ok, Lee Mi-yeon and Lee Seung-gi	
1994–2022	New Life for Children	Co-host	with Ha Sung-woon and Lee Dae-hwi (2019) with Lee Sang-yeob (2021) with Kim Cho-rong (2022)	
2021	Off The Grid	Main Cast		
2026	Bonjour Bakery	Main Cast	with Cha Seung-won, Kim Seon-ho, and Lee Ki-taek	

=== Radio program ===
Radio program
Year	English title	Korean title	Station	Ref.
1986	Popular Music FM with Kim Hee-ae	김희애의 FM인기가요	KBS Happy FM	

== Accolades ==
=== Awards and nominations ===
Name of the award ceremony, year presented, category, nominee of the award, and the result of the nomination
Award ceremony	Year	Category	Nominee / Work	Result	Ref.
APAN Star Awards	2014	Top Excellence Award, Actress in a Miniseries	Secret Love Affair	Won	
APAN Star Awards	2021	Grand Prize (Daesang)	The World of the Married	Nominated	
Asia Contents Awards	2020	Best Actress	The World of the Married	Won	
Baeksang Arts Awards	1987	Best New Actress (TV)	A Woman's Heart	Won	
Baeksang Arts Awards	1993	Grand Prize (Daesang) for TV	Sons and Daughters	Won	
Baeksang Arts Awards	1993	Most Popular Actress (TV)	Sons and Daughters	Won	
Baeksang Arts Awards	1995	Best Actress (TV)	Kareisky	Nominated	
Baeksang Arts Awards	2003	Best Actress (TV)	Wife	Won	
Baeksang Arts Awards	2004	Grand Prize (Daesang) for TV	Perfect Love	Won	
Baeksang Arts Awards	2008	Best Actress (TV)	Perfect Love	Nominated	
Baeksang Arts Awards	2013	Best Actress (TV)	How Long I've Kissed	Won	
Baeksang Arts Awards	2014	Best Actress (Film)	Thread of Lies	Nominated	
Baeksang Arts Awards	2019	Best Actress (Film)	Herstory	Nominated	
Baeksang Arts Awards	2020	Grand Prize (Daesang) for TV	The World of the Married	Nominated	
Baeksang Arts Awards	2020	Best Actress (TV)	The World of the Married	Won	
Baeksang Arts Awards	2020	Best Actress (Film)	Moonlit Winter	Nominated	
Bechdel Day	2020	Moonlit Winter	Bechdelian in film — Actor of the Year	Won	
Blue Dragon Film Awards	1993	Best Leading Actress	The 101st Proposition	Nominated	
Blue Dragon Film Awards	2014	Best Leading Actress	Thread of Lies	Nominated	
Blue Dragon Film Awards	2018	Best Leading Actress	Herstory	Nominated	
Blue Dragon Film Awards	2021	Best Leading Actress	Moonlit Winter	Nominated	
Buil Film Awards	2018	Best Actress	Herstory	Won	
Buil Film Awards	2020	Best Actress	Moonlit Winter	Nominated	
Chunsa Film Art Awards	2019	Best Actress	Herstory	Nominated	
Chunsa Film Art Awards	2020	Best Actress	Moonlit Winter	Nominated	
Director's Cut Awards	2022	Best Actress in film	Moonlit Winter	Nominated	
Elle Style Awards	2018	Timeless Icon	—N/a	Won	
Grand Bell Awards	1994	Best Actress	The 101st Proposition	Nominated	
Grand Bell Awards	2020	Best Actress	Moonlit Winter	Nominated	
Grimae Awards	2003	Best Actress	Perfect Love	Won	
KBS Drama Awards	1986	Best New Actress	A Woman's Heart	Won	
KBS Drama Awards	2003	Top Excellence Award, Actress	Wife	Nominated	
KBS Drama Awards	2005	Top Excellence Award, Actress	Precious Family	Nominated	
Korea Broadcasting Producer Awards	1994	Best Performer, TV Actress category	Sons and Daughters	Won	
Korea Broadcasting Producer Awards	1996	Best Performer, TV Actress category	Love and Marriage	Won	
Korea Broadcasting Producer Awards	2004	Best Performer, TV Actress category	Perfect Love	Won	
Korea Drama Awards	2007	Grand Prize (Daesang)	My Husband's Woman	Won	
Korea Drama Awards	2014	Top Excellence Award, Actress	Secret Love Affair	Nominated	
Korea-China International Film Festival	2018	Best Actress	Herstory	Won	
Korea Fashion & Design Awards	2007	Best Dressed	—N/a	Won	
Korean Film Producers Association Awards	2020	Best Actress	Moonlit Winter	Won	
Marie Claire Asia Star Awards	2018	Actress of the Year	Herstory	Won	
MBC Drama Awards	1990	Top Excellence Award, Actress	Forget Tomorrow	Won	
MBC Drama Awards	1991	Top Excellence Award, Actress	Beyond the Mountains	Nominated	
MBC Drama Awards	1991	Grand Prize (Daesang)	Beyond the Mountains	Won	
MBC Drama Awards	1993	Grand Prize (Daesang)	Sons and Daughters	Won	
MBC Drama Awards	1993	Top Excellence Award, Actress	Sons and Daughters	Nominated	
MBC Drama Awards	1995	Top Excellence Award, Actress	Love and Marriage	Nominated	
Our Star Awards	1987	Best New Actress	A Woman's Heart	Won	
SBS Drama Awards	2003	Top Excellence Award, Actress	Perfect Love	Nominated	
SBS Drama Awards	2003	Top 10 Stars	Perfect Love	Won	
SBS Drama Awards	2003	SBSi Award	Perfect Love	Won	
SBS Drama Awards	2007	Grand Prize (Daesang)	My Husband's Woman	Won	
SBS Drama Awards	2007	Top Excellence Award, Actress	My Husband's Woman	Nominated	
SBS Drama Awards	2007	Top 10 Stars	My Husband's Woman	Won	
SBS Drama Awards	2011	Top Excellence Award, Actress in a Special Planning Drama	Midas	Nominated	
SBS Drama Awards	2015	Top Excellence Award, Actress in a Miniseries	Mrs. Cop	Nominated	
SBS Drama Awards	2016	Top Excellence Award, Actress in a Romantic-Comedy Drama	Second to Last Love	Nominated	
Seoul International Drama Awards	2014	Best Actress	Secret Love Affair	Won	
Style Icon Awards	2008	Style Icon, TV actress category	My Husband's Woman	Won	
Style Icon Awards	2014	Top 10 Style Icons	—N/a	Won	
The Seoul Awards	2018	Best Actress (Film)	Herstory	Nominated	
TV Journal	1993	Star of the Year	—N/a	Won	

=== State honors ===
Name of country, year given, and name of honor
Country	Award ceremony	Year	Honor	Ref.
South Korea	51st Savings Day	2014	Presidential Commendation	
South Korea	Korean Popular Culture and Arts Awards (Note: Honors are given at the Korean Popular Culture and Arts Awards, arranged by the Korea Creative Content Agency and hosted by the Ministry of Culture, Sports and Tourism. They are awarded to those who have contributed to the arts and South Korea's pop culture.)	2020	Presidential Commendation	

=== Listicles ===
Name of publisher, year listed, name of listicle, and placement
Publisher	Year	Listicle	Placement	Ref.
Forbes Korea	2015	Korea Power Celebrity	26th	
Forbes Korea	2021	Korea Power Celebrity	34th	
Gallup Korea	2020	Actor of the Year (Television)	1st	
