= Chunja's Special Day =

- Promotional poster
- Also known as: Happy Events at Chunja's; Chunja's Happy Events
- Hangul: 춘자네 경사났네
- RR: Chunjane gyeongsa nanne
- MR: Ch'unjane kyŏngsa nanne
- Written by: Ku Hyun-sook; Jung Ui-yeon
- Directed by: Jang Geun-soo; Joo Sung-woo
- Starring: Seo Ji-hye; Go Doo-shim; Joo Sang-wook; Wang Bit-na; Kim Ki-bum
- Country of origin: South Korea
- Original language: Korean
- No. of episodes: 111

Production
- Executive producer: Lee Dae-young
- Running time: 40 minutes

Original release
- Network: Munhwa Broadcasting Corporation
- Release: May 19 – November 13, 2008

Chunja's Special Day (Korean: 춘자네 경사났네) is a 2008 South Korean drama television series that aired from May 19 to November 13, 2008, on MBC.

== Plot ==
Hwang Chun-ja runs a karaoke bar named "Night Rose" on a remote island and is a single mother to her daughter, Yeon Boon-hong. Boon-hong is a nursing assistant who works at a public health center in her hometown. When her boyfriend Nam Gi-seok gets her pregnant, he tells her to get an abortion, but she's unable to go through with it. Boon-hong is friends with the couple Lee Joo-young and Lee Sun-hee, and they are all together when Joo-young and Sun-hee lose their lives in a boating accident. Boon-hong survives, but through some misunderstandings, Joo-young's family assumes that she's his girlfriend, not Sun-hee. At the end of her rope, Boon-hong moves into the Lee household to escape her difficulties, letting the family believe that she's carrying Joo-young's child. Joo-young's older brother Lee Joo-hyuk soon finds himself falling for Boon-hong, and she dreads the Lee family finding out the lies that she told.

== Cast ==
- Seo Ji-hye as Yeon Boon-hong
- Go Doo-shim as Hwang Chun-ja
- Joo Sang-wook as Lee Joo-hyuk
- Wang Bit-na as Lee Joo-ri
- Kim Ki-bum as Park Jung-woo
- Yoon Mi-ra as Heo Young-ae
- Roh Joo-hyun as Lee Man-seok
- Yang Hyun-tae as Lee Joo-young
- Kang Nam-gil as Lee Dae-pal
- Jung So-hee as Heo Young-ok
- Jung Han-heon as Oh Byung-gu
- Kim Mi-so as Oh Da-jung
- Han Da-min as Park Jung-yeon
- Kim Byung-se as Park Dal-sam
- Jung Hye-sun as Cha Bok-shim
- Im Hyun-sik as Park Tae-sam
- Youn Yuh-jung as Yang Boon-hee
- Yang Hee-kyung as Park Sam-sook
- Choi Ji-yeon as Lee Sun-hee
- Heo Jung-min as Nam Gi-seok
- Kim Dong-joo as Gi-seok's mother
