= Snow Flower (TV series) =

- Promotional poster
- Also known as: Snowflakes
- Based on: Flower in Snow by Kim Soo-hyun
- Written by: Park Jin-woo
- Directed by: Lee Jong-soo
- Starring: Kim Hee-ae; Go Ara; Lee Jae-ryong; Kim Ki-bum
- Country of origin: South Korea
- No. of episodes: 16

Production
- Production locations: South Korea, Japan
- Running time: 60 minutes Mondays and Tuesdays at 21:55 (KST)
- Production company: Samhwa Networks

Original release
- Network: Seoul Broadcasting System
- Release: November 20, 2006 – January 9, 2007

Snow Flower (Korean: 눈꽃; RR: Nunkkot) is a 2006 South Korean television series starring Kim Hee-ae, Go Ara, Lee Jae-ryong and Kim Ki-bum. It aired on SBS from November 20, 2006 to January 9, 2007 on Mondays and Tuesdays at 21:55 for 16 episodes.

A story about a mother who tries to protect her daughter out of love but inflicts pain instead, the drama series was based on the same-titled novel written by Kim Soo-hyun. It was also adapted into the 1992 film Flower in Snow starring Yoon Jeong-hee and Lee Mi-yeon.

== Plot ==
When she was young, Yoo Da-mi (Go Ara) was forced to move in with her grandmother. Her father subsequently disappeared from her life, and since then, she'd always believed that he'd died. As time passes, her mother Lee Kang-ae (Kim Hee-ae) becomes one of the country's bestselling authors. Consequently, she never found time to spend with her daughter. One day, Da-mi accidentally intercepts a phone call from her father, Yoo Geon-hee (Lee Jae-ryong), and realizes that her mother has lied to her all these years about her father's whereabouts. Angry, Da-mi rebels by deciding not to go to college, despite having excellent grades in high school. On a whim, she accompanies her friend to an audition, and becomes an actress instead. Coincidentally, the first film Da-mi stars in is based on one of Kang-ae's novels. During one of their heated arguments, Da-mi tells her mother that she's going to Japan to search for her father. Meanwhile, at her side is her boss's stepbrother, Ha Young-chan (Kim Kibum), a family friend who secretly loves Da-mi and keeps helping her even though she's rejected his feelings.

== Cast ==
=== Main characters ===
- Kim Hee-ae as Lee Kang-ae
- Go Ara as Yoo Da-mi
  - Yoon Jung-eun as young Da-mi
- Lee Jae-ryong as Yoo Geon-hee
- Kim Ki-bum as Ha Young-chan
- Lee Chan as Ha In-chan, Young-chan's brother

=== Supporting characters ===
- Kim Sung-joon as Park Dong-woo, Kang-ae's boyfriend
- Ahn Jae-hwan as Min Ji-seob, Kang-ae's doctor friend
- Kim Young-ok as Kang-ae's mother and Da-mi's grandmother
- Kim Bo-yeon as Choi Jung-sun, Kang-ae's business assistant
- Song Seok-ho as Lee Man-ho, Jung-sun's husband
- Hwang Geum-hee (Note: Credited as Ji Sung-won) as Lee Shin-ae, Jung-sun and Man-ho's eldest daughter
- Lee Gun-joo as Lee Shin-beom, Jung-sun and Man-ho's son
- Hayama as Sakae, Geon-hee's Japanese wife
- Hoshino as Yuka, Geon-hee's Japanese daughter
- Kim Min-chae as Choi Jung-ja
- Park Ji-mi as Da-mi's friend
- Kim Ha-yoon as Oh Hee-jin
- Shin Kwi-shik

== International broadcast ==
In Thailand aired on Modernine TV beginning July 29, 2008 to October 1, 2008, on Mondays-Wednesdays at 13:05-14:00
