= Ha Yoo-mi =

South Korean actress (born 1963)

- Born: July 7, 1963 (age 63); South Korea
- Education: Osaka Ohtani University
- Occupation: Actress
- Years active: 1988–present
- Spouse: Clarence Ip (m. 1999)

Korean name
- Hangul: 하유미
- Hanja: 河有美
- RR: Ha Yumi
- MR: Ha Yumi

Ha Yoo-mi (Korean: 하유미; born July 7, 1963) is a South Korean actress. Ha received acting recognition for her supporting roles in the television dramas My Husband's Woman (2007) and Queen of Reversals (2010).

== Filmography ==
=== Film ===
Year	Title	Role	Notes
1988	Byun Kang-soi 3	Ong-nyeo	
1989	Red Actress	Kim Sun-mi	
1991	Green Sleeves	Ray	
1991	Form of the Last Man	Oh Yoon-hee	
1992	The Woman Everyone Wanted to Kill		
1992	Jazz Bar Hiroshima	Hubiko	
1992	Decadence 37'2	Ji Seung-hwa	
1993	That Woman, That Man	Sook	
1994	Coffee, Copy and a Bloody Nose	Park Mi-ran	
1994	No Need to Justify Yearning	Jung-hee	
1995	A Hot Roof	Lee Jung-hee	
1997	Ivan the Mercenary	Ling-ling	
1997	Destiny	Mi-ja	
2001	Paradise Villa	Piano teacher	
2013	A Journey with Korean Masters	Manager	segment: "Illusion"

=== Television series ===
Year	Title	Role	Network
1991	Humble Men		MBC
1992	Morning Without Parting		KBS2
1992	TV Literature Theater: "The Place Where the Harmonium Was"		KBS1
1994	Daughters of a Rich Family	Kwon Cha-ryung	KBS2
1995	Gaeseongsidae		KBS2
1996	Lovers	Kim Hae-ri	MBC
1996	When the Salmon Returns		SBS
1997	Model		SBS
1997	Cinderella	Kim Kyung-hee	MBC
1997	Sing Sing's The Art of War	Yeon-hee	KBS2
1999	You Don't Know My Mind	Hae-ra	MBC
1999	Who Are You	Jo Ok-joo	SBS
2002	Ling Ling	Choi Sa-rang	MBC
2002	Dae Bak Family	Ha Yoo-mi	SBS
2002	Royal Story: Jang Hui-bin	Sook-jung	KBS2
2005	The Barefooted Youth	Park Hwa-sook	MBC
2006	Love and Ambition	Hye-young	SBS
2007	My Husband's Woman	Kim Eun-soo	SBS
2008	Mom's Dead Upset	Lee Ji-na	KBS2
2009	Cain and Abel	Kim Hyun-joo	SBS
2010	Queen of Reversals	Han Song-yi	MBC

=== Variety show ===
Year	Title	Network	Notes
2008	Talk & City	Story On	Host

== Awards and nominations ==
Year	Award	Category	Nominated work	Result
1995	31st Baeksang Arts Awards	Most Popular Actress (TV)	Daughters of a Rich Family	Won
2007	SBS Drama Awards	Best Supporting Actress in a Miniseries	My Husband's Woman	Won
2007	SBS Drama Awards	Best Couple Award with Kim Byung-se	My Husband's Woman	Won
2010	MBC Drama Awards	Golden Acting Award, Supporting Actress	Queen of Reversals	Won
2011	4th Korea Drama Awards	Best Supporting Actress	Queen of Reversals	Nominated
