= APAN Star Awards =

South Korea annual award for excellence in television

- Current: 2025 APAN Star Awards
- Native name: 에이판 스타 어워즈
- Awarded for: Excellence in television; Contribution to Korean Wave
- Country: South Korea
- Presented by: Korea Entertainment Management Association
- First award: December 8, 2012; 13 years ago
- Website: apanstarawards.com

The APAN Star Awards (Note: APAN stands for the Asia Pacific Actors Network.) (Note: The inaugural ceremony K-Drama Star Awards was renamed to APAN Star Awards in 2013.) is an awards ceremony for excellence in television in South Korea and contribution to Korean Wave, organized by the Korea Entertainment Management Association (KEMA). Nominees for the awards are selected from Korean dramas that airs on the three major broadcasting networks (KBS, MBC and SBS) and cable channels (tvN, JTBC, OCN, MBN and TV Chosun) from October of the previous year to September of the current year.

== Categories ==
- Grand Prize (대상) is given to the best actor/actress of the year.
- Top Excellence in Acting Award (최우수상)
- Excellence in Acting Award (우수상)
- Best Supporting Actor/Actress (조연상), previously known as Acting Award (연기상)
- Best New Actor/Actress (신인상), previously known as Rising Star Award (라이징스타상)
- Best Young Actor/Actress (아역상)
- Best Production Director (연출상)
- Best Writer (작가상)
- Best Original Soundtrack (베스트OST상)
- Best Entertainer (엔터테이너)
- Popular Star Award (인기스타상)
- Best Couple Award (베스트 커플상)
- Hallyu Star Award (한류 스타상)
- Best Dressed (베스트드레서상), previously known as Fashionista Award (패셔니스타상)
- Achievement Award (공로상)
- OTT award : This category was introduced in 2022 from 8th edition of awards.

== Grand Prize (Daesang) ==
#	Year	Winner	Drama
1	2012	Son Hyun-joo	The Chaser
2	2013	Song Hye-kyo	That Winter, the Wind Blows
3	2014	Zo In-sung	It's Okay, That's Love
4	2015	Kim Soo-hyun	The Producers
5	2016	Song Joong-ki	Descendants of the Sun
6	2018	Lee Byung-hun	Mr. Sunshine
7	2020	Hyun Bin	Crash Landing on You
8	2022	Song Joong-ki	Vincenzo
9	2023	Lee Jun-ho	King the Land
10	2024	Kim Tae-ri	Jeongnyeon: The Star Is Born
11	2025	IU	When Life Gives You Tangerines

== Drama of the Year ==
Year	Winner
2016	Descendants of the Sun
2018	Mr. Sunshine
2020	Itaewon Class
2022	The Red Sleeve
2023	Little Women
2024	Jeongnyeon:The Star Is Born
2025	When Life Gives You Tangerines

== Top Excellence in Acting Awards ==
=== Best Actor ===
Year	Winner	Drama
2012	Song Joong-ki	The Innocent Man
2013	Lee Joon-gi	Two Weeks

=== Best Actor in a Miniseries ===
Year	Winner	Drama
2014	Kim Soo-hyun	My Love from the Star
2015	Lee Sung-min	Misaeng: Incomplete Life
2016	Cho Jin-woong	Signal
2018	Park Seo-joon	What's Wrong with Secretary Kim
2020	Kang Ha-neul	When the Camellia Blooms
2022	Lee Jun-ho	The Red Sleeve
2023	Ryu Seung-ryong	Moving
2024	Ji Chang-wook	Welcome to Samdal-ri
2025	Lee Jun-ho	Typhoon Family

=== Best Actor in a Serial Drama ===
Year	Winner	Drama
2014	Cho Jae-hyun	Jeong Do-jeon
2015	Kim Sang-joong	The Jingbirok: A Memoir of Imjin War
2016	Ahn Jae-wook	Five Enough
2018	Lee Sang-woo	Marry Me Now
2020	Lee Sang-yeob	Once Again
2022	Joo Sang-wook	The King of Tears, Lee Bang-won
2023	Go Soo	Missing: The Other Side 2
2024	Ji Hyun-woo	Beauty and Mr. Romantic
2025	Son Chang-min	Good Luck!

=== Best Actor in an OTT Drama ===
Year	Winner	Drama
2022	Jung Hae-in	D.P.

=== Best Actress ===
Year	Winner	Drama
2012	Kim Nam-joo	My Husband Got a Family
2013	Lee Bo-young	I Can Hear Your Voice, Seoyoung, My Daughter

=== Best Actress in a Miniseries ===
Year	Winner	Drama
2014	Kim Hee-ae	Secret Affair
2015	Kim Hee-sun	Angry Mom
2016	Han Hyo-joo	W
2018	IU	My Mister
2020	Kim Hee-sun	Alice
2022	Shin Min-a	Hometown Cha-Cha-Cha, Our Blues
2023	Uhm Jung-hwa	Doctor Cha
2024	Lee Hanee	Knight Flower
2025	Cha Joo-young	The Queen Who Crowns

=== Best Actress in a Serial Drama ===
Year	Winner	Drama
2014	Kim Hee-sun	Wonderful Days
2015	Kim Hyun-joo	I Have a Lover
2016	Kim So-yeon	Happy Home
2018	Shin Hye-sun	My Golden Life
2020	Lee Min-jung	Once Again
2022	Park Jin-hee	The King of Tears, Lee Bang-won
2023	Lee Sung-kyung	Dr. Romantic 3
2024	Im Soo-hyang	Beauty and Mr. Romantic
2025	Park Ha-na	My Merry Marriage

=== Best Actress in an OTT Drama ===
Year	Winner	Drama
2022	Kim Sung-ryung	Political Fever

== Excellence in Acting Awards ==
=== Best Actor ===
Year	Winner	Drama
2012	Kim Soo-hyun	Moon Embracing the Sun
2012	Yoo Jun-sang	My Husband Got a Family
2013	Lee Jong-suk	I Can Hear Your Voice
2023	Lee Dong-hwi	Big Bet
2023	Jung Seok-yong	D.P. 2
2025	Ko Kyu-pil	Genie, Make a Wish and Twelve

=== Best Actor in a Miniseries ===
Year	Winner	Drama
2014	Jung Woo	Reply 1994
2015	Yim Si-wan	Misaeng: Incomplete Life
2016	Namkoong Min	Remember
2018	Jung Hae-in	Something in the Rain
2020	Park Hae-joon	The World of the Married
2022	Jin Seon-kyu	Through the Darkness
2023	Park Hae-soo	Narco-Saints
2023	Jo Han-chul	Reborn Rich & Stealer: The Treasure Keeper
2024	Lee Yi-kyung	Marry My Husband
2025	Lee Jun-young	When Life Gives You Tangerines & Pump Up the Healthy Love

=== Best Actor in a Serial Drama ===
Year	Winner	Drama
2014	Kim Ji-hoon	Jang Bo-ri Is Here!
2015	Lee Joon	Heard It Through the Grapevine
2016	Lee Pil-mo	Happy Home
2018	Jang Seung-jo	Money Flower
2020	Lee Sang-yi	Once Again
2022	Han Sang-jin	The All-Round Wife
2023	Son Ho-jun	The First Responders 2
2024	Kim Dong-jun	Korea-Khitan War
2025	Kim Dong-wan	For Eagle Brothers

=== Best Actor in a Short Drama ===
Year	Winner	Drama
2023	Joo Jong-hyuk	Do You Know Ashtanga
2024	Lee Sang-woon	O'PENing: My Trouble-Maker Mom
2025	Park Sung-woong	A Head Coach's Turnover

=== Best Actor in an OTT Drama ===
Year	Winner	Drama
2022	Ahn Bo-hyun	Yumi's Cells, My Name
2023	Choo Young-woo	Once Upon a Small Town

=== Best Actress ===
Year	Winner	Drama
2012	Han Ji-min	Padam Padam
2013	Kim So-yeon	Two Weeks
2023	Shin Ye-eun	Revenge of Others & The Secret Romantic Guesthouse
2023	Yeom Hye-ran	The Glory, The Uncanny Counter 2 & Mask Girl
2025	Oh Na-ra	Villains Everywhere and The Nice Guy

=== Best Actress in a Miniseries ===
Year	Winner	Drama
2014	Park Shin-hye	The Heirs
2015	Park Bo-young	Oh My Ghost
2016	Seo Hyun-jin	Another Miss Oh
2018	Go Ah-sung	Life on Mars
2020	Seo Yea-ji	It's Okay to Not Be Okay
2022	Yoo Sun	Eve
2023	Kim Seo-hyung	Pale Moon
2023	Uhm Ji-won	Little Women
2024	Jung Eun-chae	Jeongnyeon: The Star Is Born and Your Honor
2025	Shin Ye-eun	The Murky Stream and A Hundred Memories

=== Best Actress in a Serial Drama ===
Year	Winner	Drama
2014	Kim Ok-vin	Steal Heart
2015	Kim Min-jung	The Merchant: Gaekju 2015
2016	Jeong Yu-mi	Six Flying Dragons
2018	Jo Bo-ah	Goodbye to Goodbye
2020	Shim Yi-young	My Wonderful Life
2022	So Yi-hyun	Red Shoes
2023	Kim Ok-vin	Arthdal Chronicles 2
2024	Oh Hyun-kyung	Suji & Uri
2025	Park Eun-hye	Marie and Her Three Daddies

=== Best Actress in a Short Drama ===
Year	Winner	Drama
2023	Shin Eun-soo	Nineteen Sea Otters
2024	Jung In-sun	Grand Shining Hotel
2025	Park Ha-sun	A Love That's Completely Useless and Psychopath Yeo Soon-jeong

=== Best Actress in an OTT Drama ===
Year	Winner	Drama
2022	Han Sun-hwa	Work Later, Drink Now
2023	Yeri	Bitch X Rich

== Supporting Awards ==
=== Best Supporting Actor ===
Year	Winner	Drama
2012	Lee Sung-min	Golden Time
2013	Jung Woong-in	I Can Hear Your Voice
2014	Ryu Seung-soo	Wonderful Days
2015	Lee Geung-young	Misaeng: Incomplete Life
2016	Jin Goo	Descendants of the Sun
2016	Kim Eui-sung	W
2018	Park Ho-san	My Mister
2018	Yoo Jae-myung	Life
2020	Oh Jung-se	Hot Stove League, It's Okay to Not Be Okay
2020	Kim Young-min	Crash Landing on You, The World of the Married
2022	Yoon Byung-hee	Vincenzo, Our Blues
2022	Heo Sung-tae	Insider, Squid Game

=== Best Supporting Actress ===
Year	Winner	Drama
2012	Kim Jung-nan	A Gentleman's Dignity
2013	Kim Sung-ryung	King of Ambition
2014	Kim Hye-eun	Secret Affair
2015	Chae Jung-an	Yong-pal
2015	Gil Hae-yeon	Heard It Through the Grapevine
2016	Kim Ji-won	Descendants of the Sun
2016	Ye Ji-won	Another Miss Oh
2018	Kim Min-jung	Mr. Sunshine
2018	Jang So-yeon	Something in the Rain
2020	Kim Sun-young	Crash Landing on You, Backstreet Rookie
2022	Kim Shin-rok	Hellbound
2022	Baek Ji-won	Extraordinary Attorney Woo, Anna

== Newcomer Awards ==
=== Best New Actor ===
Year	Winner	Drama
2013	Choi Jin-hyuk	Gu Family Book
2013	Kim Woo-bin	School 2013
2014	Do Kyung-soo	It's Okay, That's Love
2014	Son Ho-jun	Reply 1994
2015	Byun Yo-han	Misaeng: Incomplete Life
2015	Nam Joo-hyuk	Who Are You: School 2015
2016	Park Bo-gum	Reply 1988
2016	Yoon Kyun-sang	Doctors
2018	Yang Se-jong	Temperature of Love
2018	Jang Ki-yong	My Mister
2020	Jang Dong-yoon	The Tale of Nokdu
2020	Lee Do-hyun	18 Again
2022	Yoon Chan-young	All of Us Are Dead
2022	Tang Jun-sang	Move to Heaven & Racket Boys
2023	Kim Dong-hwi	Missing: The Other Side 2 & The Deal
2023	Moon Sang-min	Under the Queen's Umbrella
2024	Roh Jae-won	Doubt and Daily Dose of Sunshine
2024	Kim Jung-jin	Boyhood
2025	Kang You-seok	Resident Playbook and When Life Gives You Tangerines
2025	Lee Chae-min	Bon Appétit, Your Majesty and Crushology 101

=== Best New Actress ===
Year	Winner	Drama
2013	Kim Yoo-ri	Cheongdam-dong Alice, Master's Sun
2013	Lee Yu-bi	Gu Family Book
2014	Nam Bo-ra	Only Love
2014	Kim Seul-gi	Discovery of Love
2015	Chae Soo-bin	House of Bluebird
2015	Lim Ji-yeon	High Society
2016	Kim You-jung	Love in the Moonlight
2016	Lee Hye-ri	Reply 1988
2018	Kim Tae-ri	Mr. Sunshine
2018	Won Jin-ah	Rain or Shine
2020	Jeon Mi-do	Hospital Playlist
2022	Park Ji-hu	All of Us Are Dead
2023	Lee Han-byeol	Mask Girl
2023	Jo Ah-ram	Doctor Cha
2024	Kang Mi-na	Welcome to Samdal-ri
2024	Chae Won-bin	Doubt
2025	Ha Young	The Trauma Code: Heroes on Call and Face Me

=== Rising Star Award ===
Year	Winner	Drama
2012	Jung Eun-ji	Reply 1997
2012	Kang Min-hyuk	My Husband Got a Family
2012	Kim Hyung-jun	Glowing She, Late Blossom
2012	Oh Yeon-seo	My Husband Got a Family
2012	Seo In-guk	Reply 1997
2012	Yoo In-na	Queen and I
2012	Yoon Jin-yi	A Gentleman's Dignity
2016	Hwang Chi-yeul	
2016	Darren Wang	

== Youth Awards ==
=== Best Young Actor ===
Year	Winner	Drama
2012	Park Gun-tae	May Queen, The King 2 Hearts
2013	Chun Bo-geun	The Queen's Classroom
2014	Choi Kwon-soo	Wonderful Days
2014	Yoon Chan-young	Mama
2015	Nam Da-reum	Pinocchio

=== Best Child Actor ===
Year	Winner	Drama
2023	Jung Hyeon-jun	Twinkling Watermelon & See You in My 19th Life
2024	Lee Joo-won	Queen of Tears and My Sweet Mobster
2025	Lee Cheon-mu	When Life Gives You Tangerines

=== Best Young Actress ===
Year	Winner	Drama
2012	Kim So-hyun	Missing You, Ma Boy, Moon Embracing the Sun
2012	Kim You-jung	May Queen, Moon Embracing the Sun
2013	Kim Hyang-gi	The Queen's Classroom
2014	Kim Hyun-soo	My Love from the Star
2014	Kim Ji-young	Jang Bo-ri is Here!
2015	Kal So-won	My Daughter, Geum Sa-wol

=== Best Child Actress ===
Year	Winner	Drama
2023	Jeon Yu-na	The Kidnapping Day
2024	Park So-yi	The Atypical Family
2025	Kim Tae-yeon	When Life Gives You Tangerines

== Best Production Director ==
Year	Winner	Drama
2012	Jo Nam-kook	The Chaser
2013	Kim Byung-soo	Nine: Nine Time Travels
2014	Jang Tae-yoo	My Love from the Star
2015	Jo Soo-won	Pinocchio
2016	Shin Won-ho	Reply 1988
2018	Kim Won-seok	My Mister
2020	Cha Yeong-hoon	When the Camellia Blooms
2022	Jung Ji-in and Song Yeon-hwa	The Red Sleeve
2023	Park In-je	Moving
2024	Lee Myoungwoo	Boyhood
2025	Kim Won-seok	When Life Gives You Tangerines

== Best Writer ==
Year	Winner	Drama
2012	Park Ji-eun	My Husband Got a Family
2013	So Hyun-kyung	Seoyoung, My Daughter, Two Weeks
2014	Jung Sung-joo	Secret Love Affair
2015	Park Kyung-soo	Punch
2016	Kim Eun-hee	Signal
2018	Lee Soo-yeon	Life
2020	Lee Shin-hwa	Hot Stove League
2022	Moon Ji-won	Extraordinary Attorney Woo
2023	Kang Yoon-sung	Big Bet
2024	Choi Yu-na	Good Partner
2025	Jang Hyun-sook	Typhoon Family

== Best Original Soundtrack ==
Year	Song	Drama
2012	"All for You" – Seo In-guk and Jung Eun-ji	Reply 1997
2013	"Winter Love" – The One	That Winter, the Wind Blows
2014	"Goodbye My Love" – Ailee	Fated to Love You
2015	"Pinocchio" – Roy Kim	Pinocchio
2020	"Sweet Night" – V (BTS)	Itaewon Class
2022	"Love Always Runs Away" — Lim Young-woong	Young Lady and Gentleman
2023	"Go Your Own Way" — Young Tak	Live Your Own Life
2024	"Sudden Shower" — Eclipse	Lovely Runner
2025	"More Beautiful than heaven" - Lim Young-woong	Heavenly Ever After

== Best Entertainer ==
Year	Winner
2024	Kang Daniel
2025	Cha Eun-woo

== Popularity Awards ==
=== Popular Star Award, Actor ===
Year	Winner	Drama
2012	Yoo Jun-sang	My Husband Got a Family
2013	Ju Ji-hoon	Five Fingers
2014	Lee Kwang-soo	It's Okay, That's Love
2015	Son Ho-jun	Mrs. Cop
2018	Jung Hae-in	Something in the Rain
2020	Kim Soo-hyun	It's Okay to Not Be Okay
2022	Park Jae-chan	Semantic Error
2023	Lee Jun-ho	King the Land
2024	Byeon Woo-seok	Lovely Runner
2025	Lee Jun-ho	Typhoon Family

=== Popular Star Award, Actress ===
Year	Winner	Drama
2013	Oh Yeon-seo	Here Comes Mr. Oh
2014	Jin Se-yeon	Doctor Stranger
2015	Yoo In-young	Mask
2018	Park Min-young	What's Wrong with Secretary Kim
2020	Seo Yea-ji	It's Okay to Not Be Okay
2020	Son Ye-jin (Note: KT Seezn Star Award – Actor)	Crash Landing on You
2022	Park Eun-bin	Extraordinary Attorney Woo
2023	Im Yoon-ah	King the Land
2024	Kim Hye-yoon	Lovely Runner
2025	Kim Hye-yoon	Lovely Runner

=== Hallyu Star Award ===
Year	Winner	Drama
2012	Jung Yong-hwa	
2014	Jun Ji-hyun	My Love from the Star
2014	Kim Soo-hyun	My Love from the Star
2015	Lee Dong-gun	
2015	Hong Soo-ah	
2016	Lee Byung-hun	
2018	Park Hae-jin	
2023	Lee Jun-ho	King the Land
2024	Byeon Woo-seok	Lovely Runner

=== Best Couple Award ===
Year	Winner	Drama
2012	Seo In-guk and Jung Eun-ji	Reply 1997
2013	Lee Jong-suk and Lee Bo-young	I Can Hear Your Voice
2016	Song Joong-ki and Song Hye-kyo	Descendants of the Sun
2022	Park Seo-ham and Park Jae-chan	Semantic Error
2023	Lee Jun-ho and Im Yoon-ah	King the Land
2024	Byeon Woo-seok and Kim Hye-yoon	Lovely Runner
2025	Lee Hye-ri and Chung Su-bin	Friendly Rivalry

== Best Dressed ==
Year	Winner	Drama
2012	Go Se-won	The Moon and Stars for You
2012	Jeon Hye-bin	Queen Insoo
2013	Yeon Jung-hoon	Pots of Gold
2013	Yoo In-young	Wonderful Mama
2014	Ji Hyun-woo	
2014	Kim Yoo-ri	
2015	Oh Min-suk	All About My Mom
2015	Choi Yeo-jin	The Lover

== Best Manager ==
Year	Winner	Talent Agency
2012	Kim Jong-do	Namoo Actors
2013	Kim Dong-eop	Will Entertainment
2014	Lee Jin-sung	King Kong Entertainment
2015	Shim Jung-woon	Sim Entertainment
2016	Kim Jeong-yong	Blossom Entertainment
2018	Bae Sung	HM Entertainment
2020	Kang Geon-taek	VAST Entertainment
2022	Son Seok-woo	BH Entertainment
2023	CEO Baek Chang-ju	C-JeS Studios

== Achievement Award ==
Year	Winner	Notes
2012	Lee Soon-jae	High Kick Through the Roof, Good Morning President
2013	Choo Ja-hyun	
2013	Jung Doo-hong	The Berlin File
2014	Choi Jin-sil	
2015	Chief Inspector	
2023	Byun Hee-bong	
2024	Kim Young-ok	

== Other Awards ==
Year	Category	Winner	Drama
2012	Best Villain	Yoon Yong-hyun	History of a Salaryman
2012	Best Comic Acting	Ahn Suk-hwan	Shut Up Family
2012	Best Action Stunts	—N/a	Bridal Mask
2013	Best Performance	Jung Eun-ji	That Winter, the Wind Blows
2013	Best Action	—N/a	Gu Family Book
2014	Best SNS Web Drama	—N/a	A Hungry Woman
2015	Award for SNS Web Drama	Xiumin	Falling for Challenge
2016	Special Actor of the Year	Jun Kunimura	—N/a
2016	Best APAN Star Award	Kim Hee-sun	—N/a
2016	Best APAN Star Award	Jessy Mendiola	—N/a
2016	Best APAN Star Award	Hiroki Narimiya	—N/a
2016	Best APAN Star Award	Song Joong-ki	—N/a
2016	Best APAN Star Award	Joe Taslim	—N/a
2016	Best APAN Star Award	Thanayong Wongtrakul	—N/a
2016	Special APAN Award	Gökhan Alkan and Zeynep Çamcı	—N/a
2018	OST Award	Song Dong-woon	—N/a
2020	Web Drama Award	—N/a	Best Mistake
2020	Short-Form Drama Award	—N/a	Live Like That
2022	Web Drama Award	—N/a	Be My Boyfriend
2022	Short-Form Drama Award	—N/a	Deok-gu Is Back
2023	Best Character Award	Lee Jun-ho	King the Land
2023	Seoul League Actors Award	Lee Sung-kyung	Dr. Romantic 3
2023	Global Creator of the Year Award	Anushka Sen	—N/a
2023	Global Creator of the Year Award	Nguyen Thi Phuong Thao	—N/a
2023	Global Creator of the Year Award	Karimova Elina	—N/a
2023	Global Creator of the Year Award	Cassandra Bankson	—N/a
2023	Global Creator of the Year Award	Kristel Fulgar	—N/a
2023	Global Creator of the Year Award	Kika Kim	—N/a
2025	Best Asia Star	Chung Su-bin	Friendly Rivalry
2025	Best Asia Star	Jinyoung	Ms. Incognito

== Ceremonies ==
Edition	Date
1st K-Drama Star Awards	December 8, 2012
2nd APAN Star Awards	November 16, 2013
3rd APAN Star Awards	November 15, 2014
4th APAN Star Awards	November 28, 2015
5th APAN Star Awards	October 2, 2016
6th APAN Star Awards	October 13, 2018
7th APAN Star Awards	January 23, 2021
8th APAN Star Awards	September 29, 2022
9th APAN Star Awards	December 30, 2023
10th APAN Star Awards	December 28, 2024
11th Apan Star Awards	December 29, 2025

== See also ==
- List of Asian television awards
