= The Whirlwind (TV series) =

2024 South Korean television series

- Promotional poster
- Hangul: 돌풍
- Hanja: 突風
- Lit.: Gust
- RR: Dolpung
- MR: Tolp'ung
- Genre: Political drama
- Written by: Park Kyung-soo
- Directed by: Kim Yong-wan
- Starring: Sul Kyung-gu; Kim Hee-ae
- Music by: Kim Dong-wook
- Country of origin: South Korea
- Original language: Korean
- No. of episodes: 12

Production
- Executive producers: Kim Je-hyun; Yoo Sang-won; Park Sang-hyun; Kim Sung-min (CP)
- Producers: Lee Jung-muk; Jo Soo-young
- Cinematography: Park Jang-hyuk; Jung Sang-bum
- Editor: Kim Na-young
- Running time: 38–55 minutes
- Production companies: Studio Dragon; Pan Entertainment

Original release
- Network: Netflix
- Release: June 28, 2024

The Whirlwind (Korean: 돌풍) is a 2024 South Korean political drama television series written by Park Kyung-soo, directed by Kim Yong-wan, and starring Sul Kyung-gu and Kim Hee-ae. It was released on Netflix on June 28, 2024.

== Synopsis ==
The Whirlwind is about the colossal clash between the Prime Minister, who decides to assassinate the now corrupted President in order to turn the world upside down, and the Deputy Prime Minister and Minister for Economy and Finance, who tries to stop him and seize power.

== Cast and characters ==
=== Main ===
- Sul Kyung-gu as Park Dong-ho

The Prime Minister and Acting President, and later the President of the Republic of Korea.

- Kim Hee-ae as Jeong Su-jin

The Deputy Prime Minister and Minister of Economy and Finance, and later the Prime Minister of the Republic of Korea.

=== Supporting ===
- Kim Mi-sook as Choi Yeon-sook

The Chief of Staff at the Blue House.

- Kim Hong-pa as Jang Il-jun

The late President of South Korea.

- Kim Young-min as Kang Sang-un

The Vice Chairman of Daejin Group who is entangled with the late President Il-jun and Su-jin.

- Im Se-mi as Seo Jeong-yeon

Dong-ho's assistant.

- Jeon Bae-soo as Lee Jang-seok

Dong-ho's friend who is a prosecutor at Seoul Central District Prosecutors' Office.

- Kim Jong-gu as Park Chang-sik

A leading member of the ruling party Korea Liberal Party.

- Jang Gwang as Cho Sang-cheon

The corrupt leader of the opposition party.

- Park Geun-hyung as Chairman Kang of Daejin Group
- Lee Hae-young as Han Min-ho

Su-jin's husband.

- Kang Sang-won as Lee Man-gil

Su-jin's secretary.

- Jung Hae-kyun as Jeong Pil-gyu

Su-jin's cousin who is a Deputy Chief Prosecutor.

- Oh Min-ae as Yoo Jeong-mi

The wife of the late President Il-jun and the First lady of South Korea

== Episodes ==
No.	Directed by	Written by	Original release date
1	Kim Yong-wan	Park Kyung-soo	June 28, 2024
2	Kim Yong-wan	Park Kyung-soo	June 28, 2024
3	Kim Yong-wan	Park Kyung-soo	June 28, 2024
4	Kim Yong-wan	Park Kyung-soo	June 28, 2024
5	Kim Yong-wan	Park Kyung-soo	June 28, 2024
6	Kim Yong-wan	Park Kyung-soo	June 28, 2024
7	Kim Yong-wan	Park Kyung-soo	June 28, 2024
8	Kim Yong-wan	Park Kyung-soo	June 28, 2024
9	Kim Yong-wan	Park Kyung-soo	June 28, 2024
10	Kim Yong-wan	Park Kyung-soo	June 28, 2024
11	Kim Yong-wan	Park Kyung-soo	June 28, 2024
12	Kim Yong-wan	Park Kyung-soo	June 28, 2024

== Production ==
=== Development ===
Park Kyung-soo who wrote The Chaser (2012), Punch (2014) and Whisper (2017), made his return to the small screen after five years with The Whirlwind. Kim Yong-wan served as the director while Studio Dragon and Pan Entertainment managed the production.

=== Casting ===
In August 2022, Kim Hee-ae and Han Suk-kyu were reportedly offered to star in the series. Later, Han was replaced by Sul Kyung-gu. This was Sul's first lead role in a drama.

=== Filming ===
Principal photography began in the second half of 2022.

== Release ==
Netflix confirmed that the series would be released on June 28, 2024.

== Accolades ==
Name of the award ceremony, year presented, category, nominee of the award, and the result of the nomination
Award ceremony	Year	Category	Nominee / Work	Result	Ref.
Asia Contents Awards & Global OTT Awards	2024	Best Writer	Park Kyung-soo	Nominated	
