= 2024 Asia Contents Awards & Global OTT Awards =

2024 Asia Contents Awards

- Official poster
- Awarded for: The achievements of excellent content made for TV, OTT, and online across Asia
- Date: October 6, 2024
- Venue: BIFF Theater, Busan Cinema Center, Busan
- Country: South Korea
- Presented by: Ministry of Science and ICT; Busan Metropolitan City
- Hosted by: Kang Ki-young; Tiffany Young

Highlights
- Most wins: Mask Girl (2)
- Most nominations: Imperfect Us (5)
- Best Creative: Blossoms Shanghai
- Best OTT Original: Boyhood
- People's Choice Award (Male): Byeon Woo-seok
- People's Choice Award (Female): Kim Hye-yoon
- Website: globalottawards.org/eng/

Television/radio coverage
- Network: YouTube; U+ Mobile TV

The 2024 Asia Contents Awards & Global OTT Awards (Korean: 2024 아시아콘텐츠어워즈&글로벌OTT어워즈), presented by Ministry of Science and ICT and Busan Metropolitan City, took place on October 6, 2024, at BIFF Theater, Busan Cinema Center, Busan, South Korea. The awards ceremony was organized by Busan International Film Festival and Korea Radio Promotion Association, as an event of the 2024 edition of the festival. The Awards ceremony was hosted by Kang Ki-young and Tiffany Young.

On the award night attended by the Asian film and TV industry stars, Chinese TV series Blossoms Shanghai won two awards viz: Best Creative and Best Lead Actor awards. People's Choice Award male and female were awarded to Byeon Woo-seok and Kim Hye-yoon respectively. Coupang Play's Boyhood, a South Korean series by Lee Myung-woo won Best OTT Original award.

== Overview ==
The ACA & G.OTT Awards 2024 in its 6th year features 11 competitive categories for which the 12 international preliminary judges reviewed 201 pieces of content from 16 countries and selected 41 nominees from 10 countries. Seven international judges will decide the final winners. This year the two new awards: the 'Best Original Song' in the competition category has been added. This award will honor the most captivating Original Sound Track; and the People's Choice Award in the invitation category. which the People's will allow fans to vote for their favorite actors.

=== Awards ceremony ===
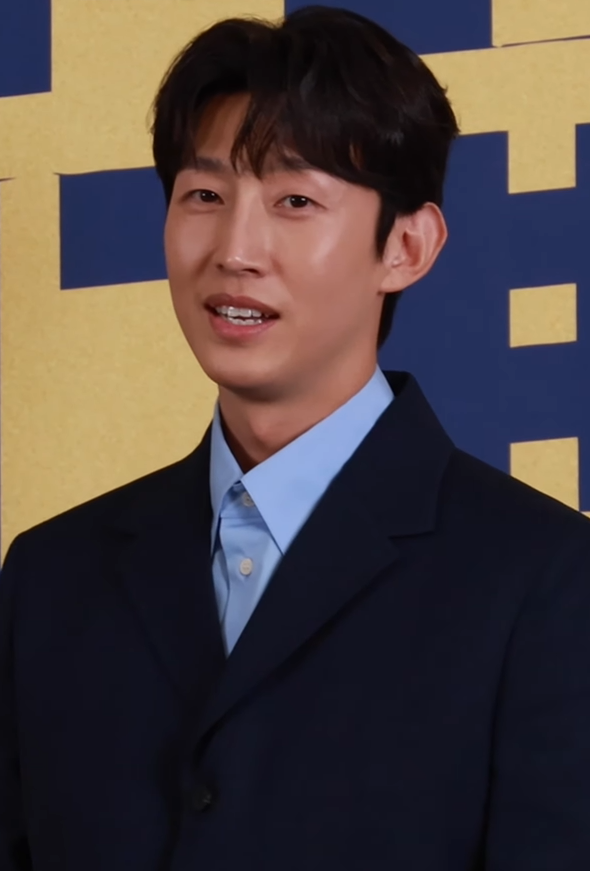
Kang Ki-young, South Korean actor

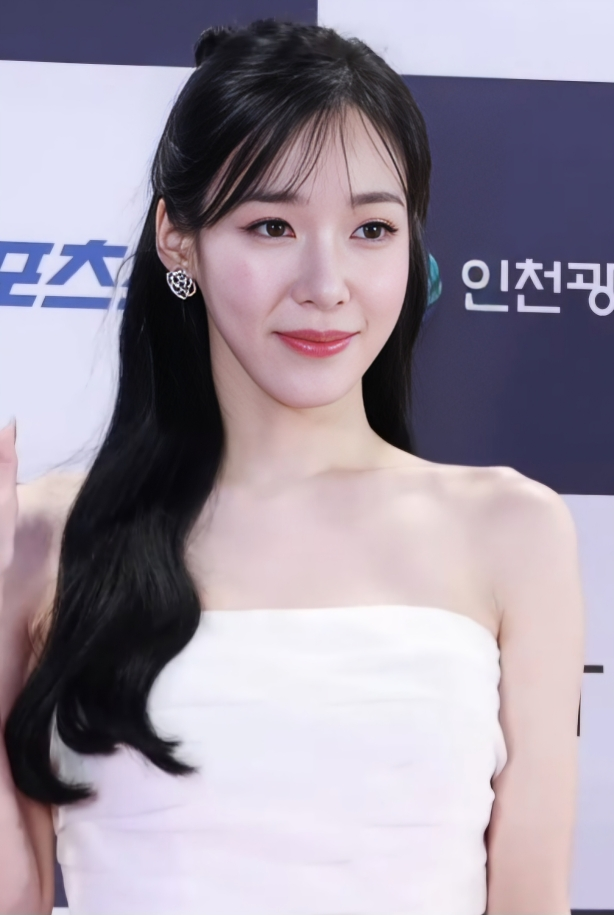
Tiffany Young, singer-songwriter

MCs of the ceremony

The Awards ceremony was hosted by actor Kang Ki-young and Tiffany Young. It included a celebratory performances by the band Nerd Connection, indie rock band from South Korea and Tri.be, a South Korean girl group.

The award show was attended by film and TV stars from Asia. Blossoms Shanghai, a Chinese series by Wong Kar-wai won two awards at the ceremony viz.: Best Creative, Best Lead Actor awards. Boyhood, a South Korean series by Lee Myung-woo of Coupang Play won Best OTT Original award.

== Jury ==
The 7 judges will judge the 11 competitive categories.

- Hidetoshi Nishijima, a Japanese actor and model.
- Jia Jian, actress Taiwan.
- Baek Mi-kyung, South Korean television and film screenwriter.
- Ahn Eun-mi, CEO of Pollux Studio Co., Ltd.
- Naohiko Matsuba, TV Man Union General Producer.
- Max Michael, United Talent Agency Asia, Business Director.
- Kim Young-deok, Asia Contents & Film Market Chairman.

== Awards and nominations ==
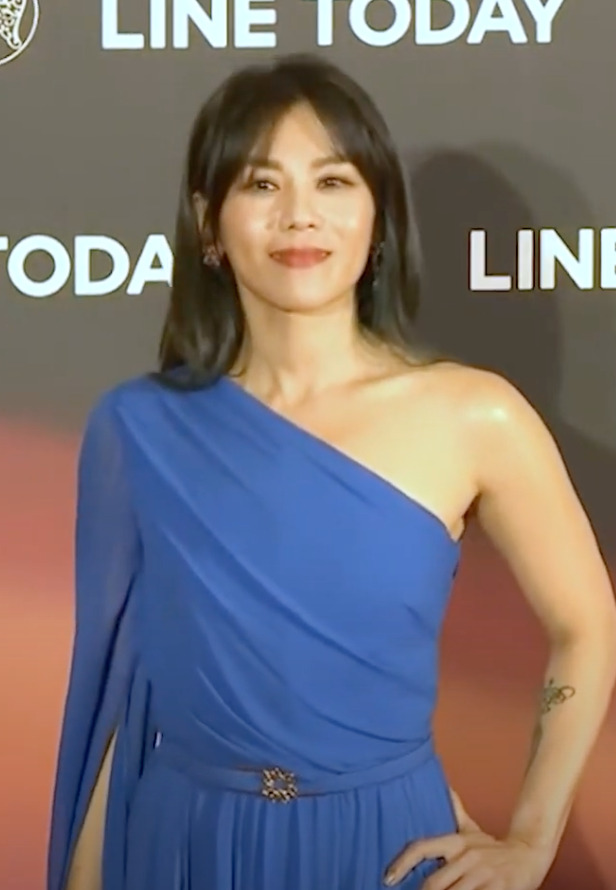
Tanya Chua, winner of Best Original Song for "Learn to Live Again" from Imperfect Us

Nominees and winners (winners denoted in bold):

=== Open competition ===
Best Creative	Best OTT Original
(China) **Blossoms Shanghai – Tencent Video**; (Indonesia) Cigarette Girl – Netflix; (South Korea) Daily Dose of Sunshine – Netflix; (Thailand) Enigma – GMMTV; (South Korea) A Killer Paradox – Netflix; (Japan) Vivant – TBS Television	(South Korea) **Boyhood – Coupang Play**; (South Korea) Death's Game – TVING; (China) The Double – Youku; (Taiwan) GG Precinct: Season 1 – Netflix; (India) Heeramandi: The Diamond Bazaar – Netflix; (South Korea) Uncle Samsik – Disney+
Best Asian TV Series	Best Reality & Variety
(Kazakhstan) **1286 – Salem Social Media**; (Taiwan) Imperfect Us – Public Television Service; (China) Imperfect Victim – iQIYI; (Singapore) The Last Bout – Mediacorp / Verite Productions; (China) To the Wonder – iQIYI; (Japan) Shut Up – telepack	(Thailand) **2 Faces – Workpoint Group**; (South Korea) **Jinny's Kitchen 2 – Egg is Coming**; (South Korea) The Community: Tensions Under The Roof – Content Wavve; (South Korea) Earth Arcade's Vroom Vroom – Egg is Coming; (Japan) Globe-Trotter Travel Guidebook – TELECOM STAFF; Wedding.con – BBC Studios India
Best Director	Best Writer
(Indonesia) **Kamila Andini, Ifa Isfansyah** – Cigarette Girl, Netflix; (Kazakhstan) Alisher Utev – 1286, Salem Social Media; (Thailand) Patha Thongpan – Enigma, GMMTV; (South Korea) Lim Dae-hyung, Jeon Go-woon – LTNS, TVING; (South Korea) Park Hoon-jung – The Tyrant, Disney+	(South Korea) **Joo Hwa-mi** – The Atypical Family, SLL; (Taiwan) Mag Hsu – Imperfect Us, Public Television Service; (Japan) Yamanishi Tatsuya – Shut Up, telepack; (China) Teng Congcong, Peng Yining – To the Wonder, iQIYI; (South Korea) Park Kyung-soo – The Whirlwind, Netflix
Best Lead Actor	Best Lead Actress
(China) **Hu Ge – Blossoms Shanghai, Tencent Video**; (South Korea) Im Si-wan – Boyhood, Coupang Play; (Taiwan) Hsu Kuang-han – GG Precinct: Season 1 – Netflix; (South Korea) Choi Woo-shik – A Killer Paradox – Netflix; (Taiwan) Wu Kang-ren – Living – TVBS Media; (South Korea) Cho Jin-woong – No Way Out: The Roulette – Studio X+U (LG Uplus); (Japan) Masato Sakai – Vivant – TBS Television	(Taiwan) **Ariel Lin – Imperfect Us – Public Television Service**; (Indonesia) Dian Sastrowardoyo – Cigarette Girl – Netflix; (South Korea) Park Bo-young – Daily Dose of Sunshine – Netflix; (Japan) Fumi Nikaido – Eye Love You – TBS Television; (China) Zhou Xun – Imperfect Victim – iQIYI; (South Korea) Kim Hye-yoon – Lovely Runner – CJ ENM Studios, Bon Factory
Best Supporting Actor	Best Supporting Actress
(South Korea) **Ahn Jae-hong – Mask Girl – Netflix**; (Indonesia) Arya Saloka – Cigarette Girl – Netflix; (Taiwan) Kai Ko – Imperfect Us – Public Television Service; (South Korea) Lee Hee-joon – A Killer Paradox – Netflix; (South Korea) Lee Kwang-soo – No Way Out: The Roulette – Studio X+U (LG Uplus); (Japan) Go Ayano – YuYu Hakusho – Netflix	(South Korea) **Yeom Hye-ran – Mask Girl – Netflix**; (China) Du Juan – Blossoms Shanghai – Tencent Video; (India) Kani Kusruti – Poacher – Poor Man's Productions; (Taiwan) Moon Lee – The Victims' Game Season 2 – Netflix; (South Korea) Kim Hyeong-seo – The Worst of Evil – Disney+
Best Newcomer Actor	Best Newcomer Actress
(Japan) **Chae Jong-hyeop** – Eye Love You – TBS Television; (South Korea) **Kim Yo-han** – A Killer Paradox – Netflix; (Thailand) Metawin Opas-iamkajorn – Enigma, GMMTV; (South Korea) Byeon Woo-seok – Lovely Runner – CJ ENM Studios, Bon Factory; (Taiwan) Tseng Jing-hua – The Victims' Game Season 2 – Netflix; (Hong Kong) Anson Kong – Warriors Within Season 2 – MakerVille	(Japan) **Nimura Sawa** – Shut Up, telepack; (China) Zhang Jingyi – Blossoms in Adversity, Youku; (South Korea) Jeon So-nee – Parasyte: The Grey – Netflix; (South Korea) Jo Yoon-su – The Tyrant, Disney+; (South Korea) Tiffany Young – Uncle Samsik – Disney+
Best Visual Effects	Best Original Song
(South Korea) **Parasyte: The Grey – Netflix**; (Thailand) 2 Faces – Workpoint Group; (South Korea) Death's Game – TVING; (Japan) YuYu Hakusho – Netflix	(Taiwan) **"Learn to Live Again" – Tanya Chua – Imperfect Us – Public Television Service**; (India) "Sakal Ban" - Sanjay Leela Bhansali, Raja Hasan – Heeramandi: The Diamond Bazaar – Netflix; (South Korea) "Sudden Shower" – Eclipse – Lovely Runner – CJ ENM Studios, Bon Factory; (Thailand) "Let's Try" – Thanawat Rattanakitpaisan – Only Friends – GMMTV

=== Invitation ===
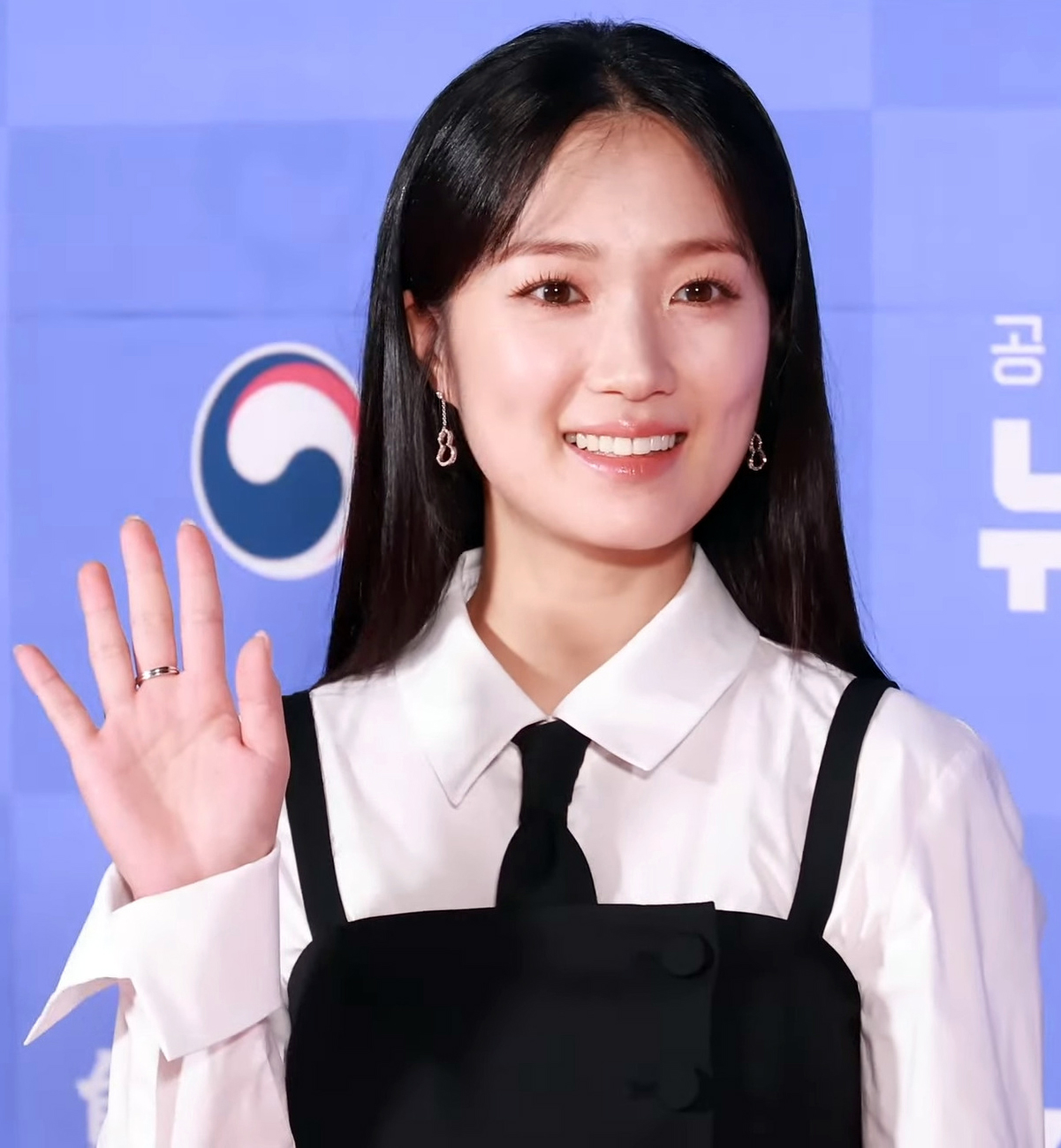
Kim Hye-yoon winner of 2024 People's Choice Award (Female)

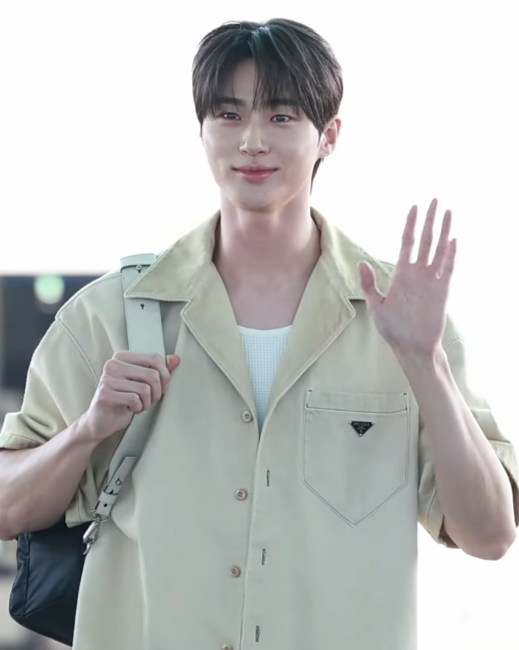
Byeon Woo-seok winner of People's Choice Award (Male)

Winners of People's Choice Award

Rising Star of the Year
**Anson Kong** – Warriors Within 2; **Ayaka Miyoshi** – Globe-Trotter Travel Guidebook; **Jo Yoon-su** – The Tyrant
Creative Beyond Border	New Technology
(South Korea) **Shaman: Whispers From The Dead**	(South Korea) **Kocowa**
People's Choice Award
Male	Female
**Byeon Woo-seok**; Chae Jong-hyeop	**Kim Hye-yoon**; Tiffany Young

== Presenters ==
SN	Presenter	Award
1	Ryu Seung-ryong and Lee Jung-ha	
2	Jin Yeon-bi and Joo Dong-woo	
3	Song Yun-hwa and Lin Baihong	
4	Shenina Cinnamon and Yusup Mahardika	
