= Park Kyung-soo =

South Korean television screenwriter (born 1969)

- Born: January 25, 1969 (age 57); South Korea
- Occupation: Screenwriter
- Agent: Pan Entertainment

Korean name
- Hangul: 박경수
- RR: Bak Gyeongsu
- MR: Pak Kyŏngsu

Park Kyung-soo (born January 25, 1969) is a South Korean television screenwriter. Park is known for his works on SBS television series, The Chaser (2012), Empire of Gold (2013) and Punch (2014–2015).

== Filmography ==
- KAIST Kaist (SBS, 1999–2000)
- Special of My Life (MBC, 2006)
- The Legend (MBC, 2007)
- The Chaser (SBS, 2012)
- Empire of Gold (SBS, 2013)
- Punch (SBS, 2014–2015)
- Whisper (SBS, 2017)
- The Whirlwind (Netflix, 2024)

== Awards ==
- 2013 49th Baeksang Arts Awards: Best Screenplay (TV) (The Chaser)
- 2013 40th Korea Broadcasting Awards: Best Screenwriter (The Chaser)
- 2015 51st Baeksang Arts Awards: Best Screenplay (TV) (Punch)
- 2015 4th APAN Star Awards: Best Writer (Punch)
- 2015 4th CARI K Drama Awards: Best Screenplay (Punch)
