= Mama (South Korean TV series) =

2014 South Korean TV series

- Promotional poster
- Also known as: Mama: Fearless of Anything in the World; Mama: Nothing to Fear
- Genre: Family drama; Melodrama; Romance
- Written by: Yoo Yoon-kyung
- Directed by: Kim Sang-hyup
- Starring: Song Yoon-ah; Jung Joon-ho; Moon Jeong-hee; Hong Jong-hyun
- Country of origin: South Korea
- Original language: Korean
- No. of episodes: 24

Production
- Executive producer: Kim Kyung-hee
- Producer: Kim Hee-yeol
- Production company: Pan Entertainment

Original release
- Network: MBC TV
- Release: August 2 – October 19, 2014

Mama (Korean: 마마) is a 2014 South Korean television series starring Song Yoon-ah, Jung Joon-ho, Moon Jeong-hee, and Hong Jong-hyun. It aired on MBC from August 2 to October 19, 2014 on Saturdays and Sundays at 21:45 for 24 episodes.

== Plot ==
Han Seung-hee is a successful painter and a happy single mother to her son, Geu-roo. But when she gets diagnosed with a terminal illness, Seung-hee becomes determined that Geu-roo will be adopted by a nice family after she's gone. So she seeks out her ex-boyfriend Moon Tae-joo, and ends up befriending Tae-joo's wife, Seo Ji-eun. Meanwhile, a much younger photographer Gu Ji-sub falls for Seung-hee.

== Cast ==
=== Main characters ===
- Song Yoon-ah as Han Seung-hee
- Jung Joon-ho as Moon Tae-joo
- Moon Jeong-hee as Seo Ji-eun
- Hong Jong-hyun as Gu Ji-sub
- Yoon Chan-young as Han Geu-roo
  - Choi Seung-hoon as child Geu-roo
  - Park Seo-joon as adult Geu-roo

=== Supporting characters ===
- Choi Song-hyun as Na Se-na
- Jung Jae-soon as Park Nam-soon
- Kim Hyun-kyoon as Moon Tae-hoon
- Jo Min-ah as Moon Bo-na
- Kim Jung-wook as Seo Young-jin
- Park Jung-soo as Kang Myung-ja
- Jeon Jin-seo as Seo Hyun-soo
- Lee Hee-do as Company president Gu
- Son Seong-yoon as Kang Rae-yeon
- Jang Seo-won as Assistant manager Lee
- Lee Chae-eun as Miss Jung
- Jung Soo-young as Jin Hyo-jung
- Jeon Soo-kyeong as Kwon Do-hee
- Choi Jong-hwan as Director Kim
- Park Ha-young as Bong Min-joo
- Jeon Jun-hyeok as Kim Han-se
- Park Ah-in as Suzy
- Hyun Jyu-ni as Rachel

== Awards and nominations ==
| Year | Award | Category | Recipient | Result |
|---|---|---|---|---|
| 2014 | 3rd APAN Star Awards | Top Excellence Award, Actress in a Miniseries | Song Yoon-ah | Nominated |
| 2014 | 3rd APAN Star Awards | Excellence Award, Actress in a Miniseries | Moon Jeong-hee | Nominated |
| 2014 | 3rd APAN Star Awards | Best Young Actor | Yoon Chan-young | Won |
| 2014 | 27th Grimae Awards | Best Drama | Mama | Won |
| 2014 | 27th Grimae Awards | Best Achievement for a Production (Drama category) | Kim Seon-il, Hwang Seong-man (cinematographers) | Won |
| 2014 | 27th Grimae Awards | Best Actress | Song Yoon-ah | Won |
| 2014 | MBC Drama Awards | Grand Prize (Daesang) | Song Yoon-ah | Nominated |
| 2014 | MBC Drama Awards | Top Excellence Award, Actor in a Special Project Drama | Jung Joon-ho | Nominated |
| 2014 | MBC Drama Awards | Top Excellence Award, Actress in a Special Project Drama | Song Yoon-ah | Won |
| 2014 | MBC Drama Awards | Top Excellence Award, Actress in a Special Project Drama | Moon Jeong-hee | Nominated |
| 2014 | MBC Drama Awards | Best New Actor | Hong Jong-hyun | Nominated |
| 2014 | MBC Drama Awards | Best Young Actor | Yoon Chan-young | Won |
| 2014 | MBC Drama Awards | Writer of the Year | Yoo Yoon-kyung | Won |
| 2015 | 51st Baeksang Arts Awards | Best Director | Kim Sang-hyup | Nominated |
| 2015 | 51st Baeksang Arts Awards | Best Actress | Song Yoon-ah | Won |
| 2015 | 51st Baeksang Arts Awards | Best Actress | Moon Jeong-hee | Nominated |
