= Whisper (TV series) =

2017 South Korean television series

- Promotional poster
- Genre: Legal thriller; Drama; Political; Romance
- Created by: Han Jung-hwan (SBS Drama Division)
- Written by: Park Kyung-soo
- Directed by: Myoungwoo Lee
- Starring: Lee Bo-young; Lee Sang-yoon; Kwon Yul; Park Se-young
- Music by: Gaemi
- Country of origin: South Korea
- Original language: Korean
- No. of episodes: 17 (Note: Originally scheduled to air for 16 episodes, the series was increased by one episode in lieu of the 2017 South Korean presidential election polling day. It was the final drama serial to air 60-minute episodes, following a repackaging of episodes in subsequent programmes.)

Production
- Executive producer: Kim Hee-yeol
- Producer: Lee Hee-soo
- Production location: South Korea
- Running time: 60 minutes
- Production company: Pan Entertainment
- Budget: 5.65 billion won

Original release
- Network: SBS TV
- Release: March 27 – May 23, 2017

Whisper (Korean: 귓속말; RR: Gwitsongmal) is a 2017 South Korean television series starring Lee Bo-young, Lee Sang-yoon, Kwon Yul, and Park Se-young. It aired on SBS from March 27 to May 23, 2017, on Mondays and Tuesdays at 22:00 (KST) for 17 episodes.

== Synopsis ==
Shin Young-joo (Lee Bo-young) is a charismatic female section chief police officer who is passionate about her career. With her family facing financial difficulties, she has to undergo much agony and pay off debts for her family. She speaks harshly, but has a heart of gold.

Lee Dong-joon (Lee Sang-yoon) is a virtuous elite judge, brilliant-minded and warm-hearted, and has a willingness to help weak people who need a listening ear.

The two join forces to uncover corruption in the defence industry involving Taebaek, the nation's largest law firm, in what becomes a major scandal.

== Cast ==
=== Main ===
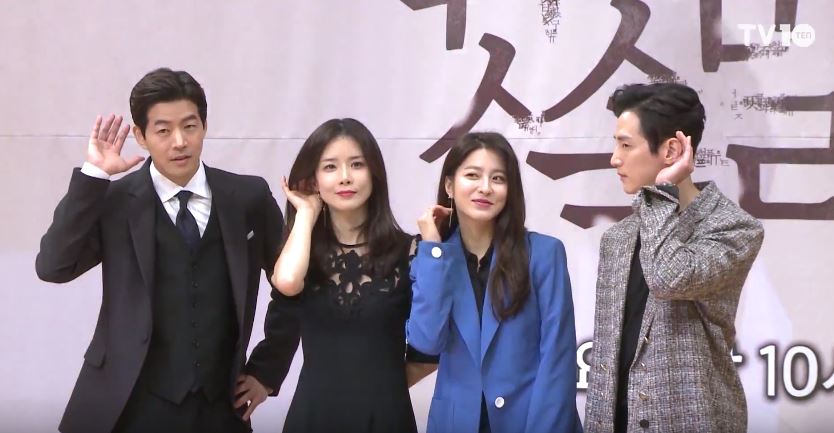
The main cast of the series at the press conference doing the "whisper gesture". From left: Lee Sang-yoon, Lee Bo-young, Park Se-young, Kwon Yul.

- Lee Bo-young as Shin Young-joo

A section chief of criminal division who fights for her father's unjustified defamation, but her fight backfires and she is dismissed from the police service. In the aftermath, she goes undercover at Taebaek Law Firm.

- Lee Sang-yoon as Lee Dong-joon

Known as a righteous judge who abides by the law and does not waver due to temptation, but he falls into a hopeless situation and has to work for Taebaek Law Firm.

- Kwon Yul as Kang Jung-il

A lawyer & Team Manager of corporate mergers and acquisitions in Taebaek Law Firm.

- Park Se-young as Choi Soo-yeon

Frivolous, nonchalant and sarcastic. Daughter of the CEO of Taebaek Law Firm.

=== Supporting ===
==== People in Taebaek Law Firm ====
- Kim Kap-soo as Choi Il-hwan
  - Lee Ji-hoon as young Choi Il-hwan (cameo)

CEO of Taebaek and father of Soo-yeon.

- Kim Hong-fa as Kang Yoo-taek
  - Lee Si-eon as young Kang Yoo-taek

Jung-il's father. Chairman of Bo-gook Industries.

- Moon Hee-kyung as Yoon Jung-ok

Soo-yeon's mother.

- Jo Dal-hwan as Jo Kyung-ho

Jung-il's close friend.

- Yoon Joo-hee as Hwang Bo-yeon

Soo-yeon's personal assistant.

- Kim Hyung-mook as Song Tae-gon

Choi Il-hwan's secretary.

- Kim Roi-ha as Baek Sang-goo

Henchmen hired by Taebaek.

==== People around Lee Dong-joon ====
- Kim Chang-wan as Lee Ho-bum

A Hospital Director of Hangang Hospital and father of Dong-joon.

- Sora Jung as Jung Mi-kyung

Dong-joon's step-mother.

- Jo Seung-yoon as Lee Dong-min

Son of Dong-joon's father & step-mother.

- Heo Jae-ho as Noh Ki-yong

Dong-joon's subordinate.

- Won Mi-kyung as Ahn Myung-sun

Dong-joon's mother.

==== People around Shin Young-joo ====
- Kang Shin-il as Shin Chang-ho

Young-joo's father; falsely accused of murder of his close friend to stop him from whistleblowing.

- Kim Hae-sook as Kim Sook-hee

Young-joo's mother.

- Lee Hyun-jin as Park Hyun-soo

Young-joo's ex-boyfriend, deceived her due to his own selfish needs.

- Jung Yi-yeon as Jo Yeon-hwa

Young-joo's close friend, whose identity Young-joo borrowed for a while.

=== Special appearance ===
- Choi Hong-il as Kim Sang-shik (Chang-ho's close friend) (Ep. 1)
- Jeon Gook-hwan as Jang Hyun-guk (Chief Justice of Supreme Court)
- Jo Kyung-sook
- Eum Moon-suk as Baek Sang-goo's subordinate (Ep. 6)
- Cho Jae-hyun as Lee Tae-joon (Ep. 17)
- Seo Ji-hye as Choi Yeon-jin (Ep. 17)

== Production ==
First script reading took place at 2pm on January 24, 2017, at SBS Tanhyeon-dong Production Center, Ilsanseo District, Goyang, Gyeonggi Province, South Korea. Filming for the drama began on February 1, 2017.

Before it was titled Whisper, its working title was Advance (진격; Jingyeok). Writer Park Kyung-soo originally wrote it as a medical drama, then revised as a police drama, until SBS scrapped it completely. But in December 2016, the broadcaster gave the project the go signal, and it was revised as a suspense/legal melodrama.

Lee Bo-young and Lee Sang-yoon reunite again for this miniseries, after previously starred together in 2012 KBS2 drama series My Daughter, Seo Yeong. Lee Bo-young and Kim Hae-sook reunite as daughter and mother after playing the roles of daughter and mother in I Can Hear Your Voice.

== Ratings ==
In the table below, the blue numbers represent the lowest ratings and the red numbers represent the highest ratings.

Ep.	Broadcast date	Average audience share			
Ep.	Broadcast date	TNmS		AGB Nielsen	
Ep.	Broadcast date	Nationwide	Seoul	Nationwide	Seoul
1	March 27, 2017	15.4% (4th)	19.1% (3rd)	13.9% (4th)	16.1% (4th)
2	March 28, 2017	12.9% (5th)	15.3% (4th)	13.4% (5th)	14.9% (4th)
3	April 3, 2017	16.3% (4th)	19.8% (3rd)	13.8% (4th)	14.1% (4th)
4	April 4, 2017	14.2% (4th)	16.3% (4th)	15.0% (4th)	16.7% (4th)
5	April 10, 2017	13.5% (4th)	15.2% (4th)	14.9% (4th)	16.0% (4th)
6	April 11, 2017	13.0% (4th)	16.2% (4th)	14.9% (4th)	15.7% (4th)
7	April 17, 2017	12.9% (6th)	15.4% (4th)	14.9% (4th)	15.5% (4th)
8	April 18, 2017	13.1% (5th)	15.9% (4th)	16.0% (4th)	16.9% (3rd)
9	April 24, 2017	13.4% (4th)	14.9% (4th)	15.5% (4th)	17.1% (3rd)
10	April 25, 2017	10.9% (7th)	13.0% (4th)	11.9% (5th)	12.5% (5th)
11	May 1, 2017	13.4% (4th)	14.5% (5th)	16.0% (3rd)	17.2% (3rd)
12	May 2, 2017	13.1% (2nd)	15.0% (1st)	15.9% (1st)	17.1% (1st)
13	May 8, 2017 (Note: No episode was aired on May 9 due to the broadcast of the 2017 South Korean presidential election polling day results.)	13.5% (4th)	15.0% (5th)	15.8% (4th)	16.8% (3rd)
14	May 15, 2017	13.1% (6th)	14.1% (4th)	17.0% (4th)	18.2% (2nd)
15	May 16, 2017	13.3% (5th)	14.4% (5th)	16.4% (4th)	17.1% (3rd)
16	May 22, 2017	15.2% (4th)	17.0% (4th)	19.2% (2nd)	20.1% (2nd)
17	May 23, 2017	15.8% (2nd)	17.5% (2nd)	20.3% (2nd)	21.8% (2nd)
Average		13.71%	15.81%	15.58%	16.70%

== Awards and nominations ==
Year	Award	Category	Recipient	Result	Ref.
2017	SBS Drama Awards	Character of the Year	Kim Kap-soo	Nominated	
2017	SBS Drama Awards	Top Excellence Award, Actor in a Monday–Tuesday Drama	Lee Sang-yoon	Nominated	
2017	SBS Drama Awards	Top Excellence Award, Actress in a Monday–Tuesday Drama	Lee Bo-young	Won	
2017	SBS Drama Awards	Excellence Award, Actor in a Monday–Tuesday Drama	Kwon Yul	Won	
2017	SBS Drama Awards	Excellence Award, Actress in a Monday–Tuesday Drama	Park Se-young	Won	
2017	SBS Drama Awards	Best Supporting Actor	Kim Hyung-mook	Nominated	
2017	1st The Seoul Awards	Best Actress	Lee Bo-young	Nominated	
