= Ryu Seung-soo =

South Korean actor (born 1971)

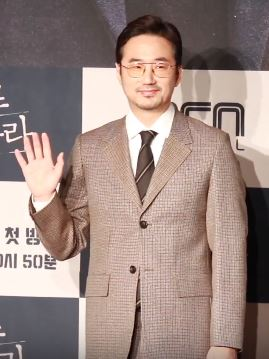
- Ryu in January 2020
- Born: August 12, 1971 (age 55); Suyeong-gu, Busan, South Korea
- Education: Seoul Institute of the Arts
- Occupation: Actor
- Years active: 1997–present
- Agent: Npio Entertainment
- Spouse: Yoon Hye-won (m. 2015)
- Children: 2

Korean name
- Hangul: 류승수
- Hanja: 柳承修
- RR: Ryu Seungsu
- MR: Ryu Sŭngsu

Ryu Seung-soo (born August 12, 1971) is a South Korean actor. Ryu made his acting debut in 1997 with a minor role in Park Chan-wook's film Trio, and has been active as a supporting actor on film and television since. Among his notable films are the monks-versus-gangsters comedy Hi! Dharma! (2001), "kimchi" western The Good, the Bad, the Weird (2008), and Korean War movie The Front Line (2011). He also appeared on TV in the quirky series Evasive Inquiry Agency (also known as Four Gold Chasers, 2007), revenge drama The Chaser (2012), and power-struggle saga Empire of Gold (2013).

Despite being one of his earliest projects, the 2002 melodrama Winter Sonata is among Ryu's better known roles outside Korea, given the series' popularity throughout Asia. In 2009, he reprised his character via voice acting in the animated adaptation Winter Sonata Anime.

Ryu wrote his memoir Don't Be an Actor Like Me, which was published in 2009.

== Filmography ==
=== Film ===
- good parents season 2 (2026)
- Love in disguise(2026)
- Love Untangled (2025)
- Picnic (2024)
- Men of Plastic (2022)
- 6/45 (2022)
- Hard Hit (2021)
- Black Money (2019) (cameo)
- Deep (2018)
- The Winter of the Year was Warm (2012)
- Doomsday Book (2012)
- The Front Line (2011)
- Battlefield Heroes (2011)
- Finding Mr. Destiny (2010)
- Second Half (2010)
- The Good, the Bad, the Weird (2008)- Man-gil
- My New Partner (2008)
- Forever the Moment (2008) (cameo)
- Happiness (2007)
- Meet Mr. Daddy (2007)
- 200 Pounds Beauty (2006) (cameo)
- All for Love (2005) (cameo)
- You Are My Sunshine (2005)
- April Snow (2005)
- Mr. Gam's Victory (2004)
- The President's Barber (2004)
- If You Were Me (2003)
- Once Upon a Time in a Battlefield (2003)
- Oh! Brothers (2003)
- Double Agent (2003)
- Conduct Zero (2002)
- Surprise Party (2002)
- Hi! Dharma! (2001)
- Say Yes (2001)
- A Growing Business (1999)
- Art Museum by the Zoo (1998)
- Rub Love (1998)
- Trio (1997)

=== Television series ===
- Bloody Heart (2022)
- Backstreet Rookie (2020) (special appearance)
- Tell Me What You Saw (2020)
- Forest (2020)
- Secret Boutique (2019)
- Level Up (2019)
- Drama Stage – "Like a Dog, Like a Beggar, Beautiful"
- Top Star U-back (2018)
- Wok of Love (2018)
- The Package (2017)
- Temperature of Love (2017)
- School of Magic (2017)
- The Lady in Dignity (2017) (cameo)
- Distorted (2017)
- A Beautiful Mind (2016)
- Uncontrollably Fond (2016) (cameo)
- My Beautiful Bride (2015)
- Shine or Go Crazy (2015)
- Punch (2014) (cameo)
- Wonderful Days (2014)
- Empire of Gold (2013)
- KBS Drama Special – "Sirius" (2013)
- Mom Is Acting Up (2012)
- The Chaser (2012)
- My One and Only (2011)
- Deep Rooted Tree (SBS, 2011)
- KBS Drama Special – "Princess Hwapyung's Weight Loss" (2011)
- Lie to Me (2011)
- Winter Sonata Anime (2009)
- High Kick Through the Roof (2009) (cameo, ep 26)
- General Hospital 2 (2008)
- Evasive Inquiry Agency (2007)
- Several Questions That Make Us Happy (2007)
- Thank You (2007)
- Cute or Crazy (2005)
- Old Miss Diary (2004) (cameo, ep 22-24)
- MBC Best Theater – "I Love You" (2003)
- Sang Doo! Let's Go to School (2003)
- Scent of a Man (2003)
- Sundeok (2003)
- Winter Sonata (2002)

=== Variety show ===
- Brave Detectives 2 (2022) - Special MC
- Law of the Jungle in Yap Islands (2015)

== Bibliography ==
- Don't Be an Actor Like Me (나 같은 배우 되지 마; 2009)

== Awards and nominations ==
Name of the award ceremony, year presented, category, nominee of the award, and the result of the nomination
Award ceremony	Year	Category	Nominee / Work	Result	Ref.
3rd APAN Star Awards	2014	Best Supporting Actor	Wonderful Days	Won	
Scene Stealer Festival	2023	Bonsang "Main Prize"	6/45; Bloody Heart	Won	
