= 51st Baeksang Arts Awards =

2015 edition of award ceremony

- Date: May 26, 2015
- Site: Grand Peace Hall, Kyung Hee University, Seoul
- Hosted by: Shin Dong-yup; Kim Ah-joong; Joo Won
- Organised by: Ilgan Sports

Highlights
- Grand Prize – Film: Choi Min-sik (actor) – The Admiral: Roaring Currents
- Grand Prize – TV: Na Young-seok (director) – Three Meals a Day
- Website: http://www.baeksangawards.co.kr/

Television/radio coverage
- Network: JTBC

The 51st Baeksang Arts Awards (Korean: 제51회 백상예술대상) ceremony was held at Kyung Hee University's Grand Peace Hall in Seoul on May 26, 2015. It was aired live on JTBC and was hosted by Shin Dong-yup, Kim Ah-joong and Joo Won. Organised by Ilgan Sports, it is South Korea's only awards ceremony which recognises excellence in both film and television.

== Winners and nominees ==
- Winners are listed first and highlighted in **boldface**.
  - Nominees

=== Film ===
**Grand Prize**
**Choi Min-sik (actor) – The Admiral: Roaring Currents**
| **Best Film** | **Best Director** |
| **Revivre**; The Admiral: Roaring Currents; A Girl at My Door; Han Gong-ju; A Hard Day | **Kim Seong-hun – A Hard Day**; Hong Sang-soo – Hill of Freedom; Im Kwon-taek – Revivre; Yoon Je-kyoon – Ode to My Father; Zhang Lu – Gyeongju |
| **Best New Director** | **Best Screenplay** |
| **July Jung – A Girl at My Door**; Hong Seok-jae – Socialphobia; Jin Mo-young – My Love, Don't Cross That River; Lee Byeong-heon – Twenty; Lee Su-jin – Han Gong-ju | **Kim Kyung-chan – Cart**; Kim Seong-hun – A Hard Day; Lee Chun-hyeong – Whistle Blower; Lee Su-jin – Han Gong-ju; Shim Sung-bo, Bong Joon-ho – Haemoo |
| **Best Actor** | **Best Actress** |
| **Lee Sun-kyun – A Hard Day**; **Cho Jin-woong – A Hard Day**; Ahn Sung-ki – Revivre; Choi Min-sik – The Admiral: Roaring Currents; Sul Kyung-gu – My Dictator | **Yum Jung-ah – Cart**; Bae Doona – A Girl at My Door; Kim Sae-ron – A Girl at My Door; Shin Min-a – Gyeongju; Son Ye-jin – The Pirates |
| **Best Supporting Actor** | **Best Supporting Actress** |
| **Yoo Hae-jin – The Pirates**; Lee Geung-young – Whistle Blower; Park Sung-woong – The Deal; Song Sae-byeok – A Girl at My Door; Yoo Yeon-seok – The Royal Tailor | **Kim Ho-jung – Revivre**; Han Ye-ri – Haemoo; Jo Yeo-jeong – Obsessed; Lee Jung-hyun – The Admiral: Roaring Currents; Moon Jeong-hee – Cart |
| **Best New Actor** | **Best New Actress** |
| **Park Yoo-chun – Haemoo**; Byun Yo-han – Socialphobia; Jo Bok-rae – C'est Si Bon; Kang Ha-neul – Twenty; Lee Min-ho – Gangnam Blues | **Chun Woo-hee – Han Gong-ju**; Esom – Scarlet Innocence; Kim Seol-hyun – Gangnam Blues; Lee Ha-nui – Tazza: The Hidden Card; Lim Ji-yeon – Obsessed |
| **Most Popular Actor** | **Most Popular Actress** |
| **Lee Min-ho – Gangnam Blues** | **Park Shin-hye – The Royal Tailor** |

=== Television ===
| **Grand Prize** | **Best Drama** |
| **Na Young-seok (director) – Three Meals a Day** | **Heard It Through the Grapevine**; Kill Me, Heal Me; Misaeng: Incomplete Life; Punch; Steal Heart |
| **Best Entertainment Program** | **Best Educational Show** |
| **Non-Summit**; Infinite Challenge; The Return of Superman; Running Man; Three Meals a Day | **Food Odyssey**; Family Shock; Revolt of the Climate; World Theme Travel; Special: Life Crossing |
| **Best Director** | **Best Screenplay** |
| **Kim Won-seok – Misaeng: Incomplete Life**; Ahn Pan-seok – Heard It Through the Grapevine; Kim Jin-man – Kill Me, Heal Me; Kim Jung-min – Bad Guys; Kim Sang-hyup – Mama | **Park Kyung-soo – Punch**; Jin Soo-wan – Kill Me, Heal Me; Jung Sung-joo – Heard It Through the Grapevine; Kim Woon-kyung – Steal Heart; Noh Hee-kyung – It's Okay, That's Love |
| **Best Actor** | **Best Actress** |
| **Lee Sung-min – Misaeng: Incomplete Life**; Cho Jae-hyun – Punch; Ji Sung – Kill Me, Heal Me; Jo In-sung – It's Okay, That's Love; Kim Rae-won – Punch | **Song Yun-ah – Mama**; Kim Ok-vin – Steal Heart; Lee Yoo-ri – Jang Bo-ri is Here!; Moon Jeong-hee – Mama; Park Shin-hye – Pinocchio |
| **Best New Actor** | **Best New Actress** |
| **Yim Si-wan – Misaeng: Incomplete Life**; Do Kyung-soo – It's Okay, That's Love; Kim Dae-myung – Misaeng: Incomplete Life; Lee Joon – Heard It Through the Grapevine; Park Hyung-sik – What Happens to My Family? | **Go Ah-sung – Heard It Through the Grapevine**; Baek Ji-yeon – Heard It Through the Grapevine; Han Sunhwa – Rosy Lovers; Kim Seul-gi – Discovery of Love; Nam Ji-hyun – What Happens to My Family? |
| **Best Male Variety Performer** | **Best Female Variety Performer** |
| **Jun Hyun-moo – Non-Summit, I Live Alone**; Jeong Hyeong-don – Please Take Care of My Refrigerator, Infinite Challenge; Kim Sung-joo – Please Take Care of My Refrigerator, King of Mask Singer; Sung Si-kyung – Witch Hunt, Non-Summit; Yoo Se-yoon – Non-Summit, Saturday Night Live Korea | **Lee Guk-joo – Roommate - Season 2, Comedy Big League**; Ahn Young-mi – Real Men: Female Soldier Special 2, Saturday Night Live Korea; Heo Anna – Gag Concert; Jang Do-yeon – Comedy Big League; Lee Young-ja – Hello Counselor |
| **Most Popular Actor** | **Most Popular Actress** |
| **Lee Jong-suk – Pinocchio** | **Krystal – My Lovely Girl** |

=== Special awards ===
| Awards | Recipient |
|---|---|
| **InStyle Fashion Award** | Lee Jung-jae, Shin Min-a |
| **iQIYI Global Star Award** | Lee Min-ho, Park Shin-hye |
