= Bad Guy (2001 film) =

2001 erotic film by Kim Ki-duk

- Bad Guy movie poster
- Hangul: 나쁜 남자
- Hanja: 나쁜 男子
- RR: Nappeun namja
- MR: Nappŭn namja
- Directed by: Kim Ki-duk
- Written by: Kim Ki-duk
- Produced by: Lee Seung-jae
- Starring: Cho Jae-hyun; Seo Won
- Cinematography: Hwang Chul-hyun
- Edited by: Hahm Sung-won
- Music by: Park Ho-jun
- Distributed by: CJ Entertainment
- Release dates: November 11, 2001 (Pusan International Film Festival); January 11, 2002 (South Korea)
- Running time: 100 minutes
- Country: South Korea
- Language: Korean
- Budget: US$590,000

Bad Guy is a 2001 South Korean film by director Kim Ki-duk about a mute man who forces a woman into prostitution then becomes protective of her.

== Plot ==
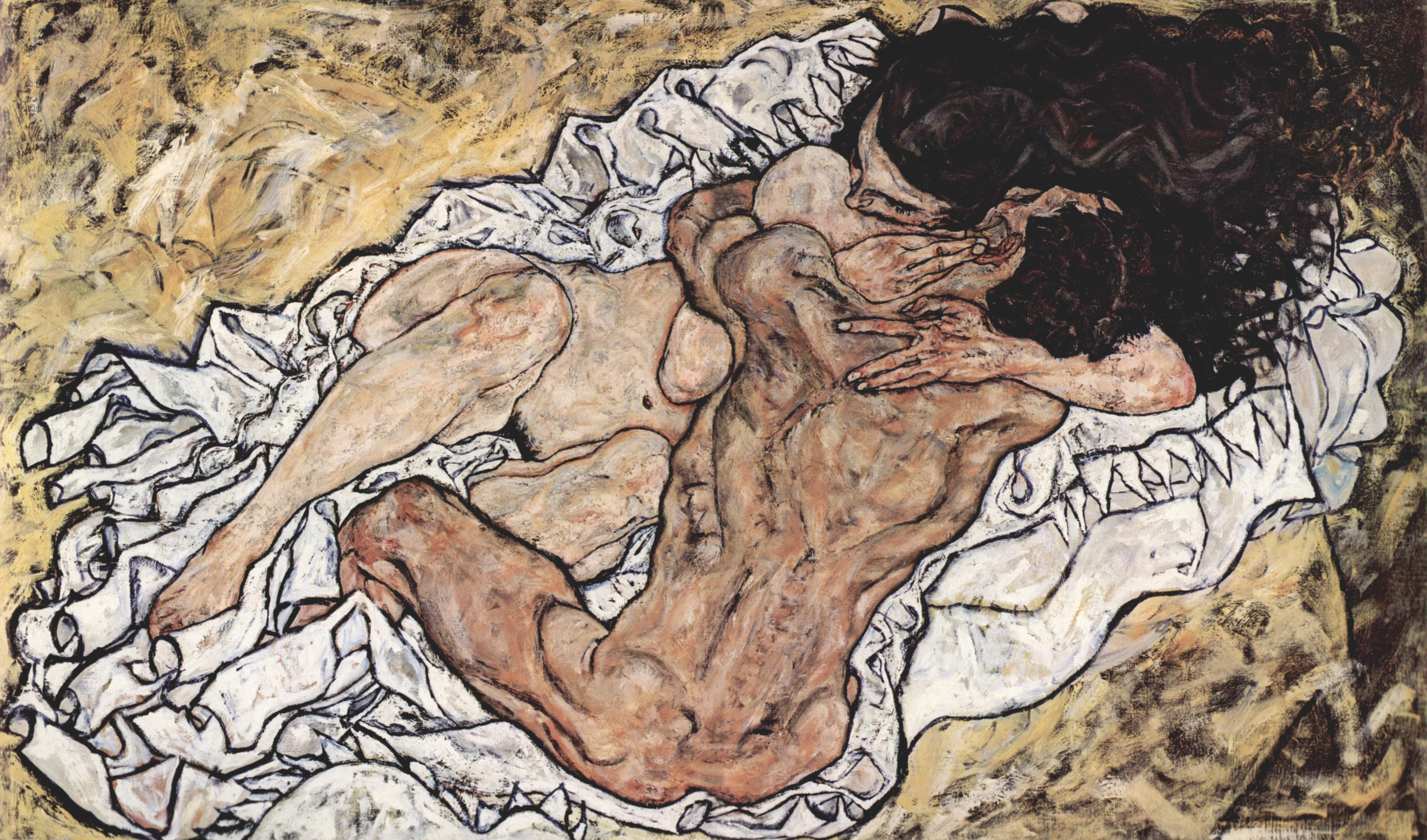
At a bookstore, Sun-hwa tears a page with this painting by Egon Schiele from an art book.

Sun-hwa sits on a bench when a man comes and sits by her side. She realizes that he is constantly looking at her and walks away irritated. Her boyfriend comes and while they are talking, the silent man grabs and forcefully kisses her. Her boyfriend tries to pull him away to no avail. When he stops, the woman demands an apology. He starts walking and a few soldiers among the crowd that gathered due to the spectacle beat and restrain him. The woman insults him and spits on his face. He remains silent.

Later, the woman is shopping at a bookstore where she tears a page from an art book about Egon Schiele she cannot afford to buy. She notices a wallet left on a book beside her and furtively tucks it into her purse, not knowing that it was planted by an associate of the man who kissed her. She hides in the toilet, takes all the money out of the wallet and leaves the store. She is accosted by the owner of the wallet, who demands his stolen wallet, claiming it had 10 million won (the rough equivalent of US$10,000). Because she doesn't have the money, he proposes a solution: a loan with her face and body as collateral. After a short time, she is unable to repay the loan shark and at this point is conveniently rescued by the silent man.

She is taken to a small brothel to work, never leaving until her debt is paid. She asks the madam for permission to see her boyfriend so that she can give her virginity to him, but when the boyfriend does not respond, the silent man attacks him in their car. Adjustment to her new life is hard and her innocence is quickly taken away. The silent man, a pimp enforcer named Han-gi, watches her through the one-way mirror installed in her room. When she later sees and recognizes him, she realizes that he trapped her in this life and attacks him.

One of the silent man's fellow pimps also develops a crush on the woman, paying to sleep with her and apologizing for ruining her life. She convinces him to help her escape, then he pulls the iron bars from her window and she sneaks away. Her freedom is short lived, however, as the silent man finds her (through the ingenious use of a T-shirt) and seizes her, taking her back to the brothel. First, he takes her to a beach, where they witness a woman committing suicide by drowning. In the sand, the woman finds a torn-up photograph.

Back at the brothel, the woman reconstructs the photo and tapes it to her mirror; she has all of the pieces except the faces of the couple it depicts.

An attack by a rival nearly kills the silent man, but when he returns from the hospital, he forbids any retaliation. One of his men kills his attacker; Han-gi confesses to police to save the man from the death penalty. But the man is consumed by guilt and commits a crime so that he can be sent to the same prison. On the scheduled day of execution, he escapes from his cell, finds the silent man, attacks him viciously and confesses everything to the guards, winning his boss's release.

Eventually the woman realizes that she is being spied on in her room, smashing the mirror to see the silent man. The faces of the couple in the photo are those of Han-gi and Sun-hwa. Han-gi repays her debt but she decides to stay with him, selling herself to fishermen in the back of a truck to earn money. The film ends with them sitting by the waterfront and later driving away, while the Swedish hymn "Blott en dag", written by Lina Sandell, sung in Swedish in the background by Carola Häggkvist.

== Cast ==
- Cho Jae-hyun as Han-gi
- Seo Won as Sun-hwa
- Kim Yoon-tae as Yoon-tae
- Choi Deok-moon as Myung-soo
- Kim Jung-young as Eun-hye
- Choi Yoon-young as Hyun-ja
- Shin Yoo-jin as Min-jung
- Namkoong Min as Hyun-soo

== Response ==
The film ignited outrage for its frank portrayal of gangsters, prostitution and sexual slavery, with women's rights activists calling it misogynist. For that reason, the lead actor and director were heavily criticized but the film was the director's greatest commercial success.
