= Backstreet Rookie =

2020 South Korean television series

- Promotional poster
- Hangul: 편의점 샛별이
- Lit.: Convenience Store Saet-byul
- RR: Pyeonuijeom Saetbyeori
- MR: P'yŏnŭijŏm Saetpyŏri
- Genre: Romantic comedy
- Based on: She's Too Much for Me (lit. Convenience Store Saet-byul) by Hwalhwasan (Active Volcano) and Geumsagong → SUGIKI HARUMI
- Written by: Son Geun-joo
- Directed by: Myoungwoo Lee
- Starring: Ji Chang-wook; Kim You-jung; Han Sun-hwa; Do Sang-woo; Ahn Sol-bin; Kim Min-kyu
- Ending theme: "Crazy" by April
- Country of origin: South Korea
- Original language: Korean
- No. of episodes: 16

Production
- Executive producer: Jung Tae-won
- Camera setup: Single-camera
- Running time: 70 minutes
- Production company: Taewon Entertainment

Original release
- Network: SBS TV
- Release: June 19 – August 8, 2020

Backstreet Rookie (Korean: 편의점 샛별이) is a 2020 South Korean television series starring Ji Chang-wook, Kim You-jung, Han Sun-hwa, Do Sang-woo, Ahn Sol-bin, and Kim Min-kyu. It is based on the 2016–2017 webtoon She's Too Much for Me (Korean: 편의점 샛별이; lit. 'Convenience Store Saet-byul') written by Hwalhwasan (Active Volcano). It is the first Korean drama funded by the global channel Lifetime and produced by Taewon Entertainment. The series aired on SBS TV at 22:00 (KST) from June 19 to August 8, 2020, on Fridays and Saturdays for 16 episodes. It is available on iQIYI and on Rakuten Viki with subtitles in multiple languages globally.

== Story ==
=== Prologue ===
After being dumped by his girlfriend, Dae-hyun is approached by high-school tough girl Saet-byul, who needs an adult to help her buy cigarettes, but she is rewarded with candy and a lecture instead. Thankful for his caring act, albeit somewhat sarcastically, she surprises him by kissing him. They go their separate ways and do not see each other for a while.

Three years later, Dae-hyun manages his family-owned convenience store but is repeatedly forced to work multiple shifts, depriving him of sleep, and he struggles to keep up with the store's daily operations due to fatigue. Although high school girls like to come in and take pictures with him, the store doesn't make a lot of money. In order to keep his business afloat, Dae-hyun's father urges him to hire a part-time employee to help him out with the store. With Saet-byul being the only applicant, Dae-hyun reluctantly agrees to hire her on a probationary basis.

=== Main story ===
Dae-hyun has been suffering due to his convenience store not making enough money and his unreliable family not helping enough. Burned out from overwork at the store, he agrees to hire a part-timer for the late-night shift. Saet-byul sees the ad, and she applies for the job to get close to him. Dae-hyun remembers Saet-byul as a delinquent and is prepared to reject her, but relents after she brings in more customers. Not fully accepting her, he makes it clear she's on probation until she proves herself.

While trying to make his business successful, Dae-hyun seeks to advance his relationship with Yeon-joo; there has been interference due to mistrust and insecurity. Yeon-joo comes from an affluent family, while Dae-hyun is just a store manager, and she is not prepared to introduce him to her family. Jo Seung-joon (Do Sang-woo) is a family friend to Yeon-joo and a co-worker at the company. He always desired Yeon-joo, but she resisted his advances for Dae-hyun. The stability of their relationship will be tested after Yeon-joo meets Saet-byul.

Yeon-joo has heard gossip about Dae-hyun hiring a beautiful part-timer, but isn't concerned until they meet. While out on a date with Dae-hyun, Yeon-joo offends some delinquents who intend to rob her until Saet-byul defeats them. After seeing her beauty and Saet-byul's affectionate gaze at Dae-hyun, Yeon-joo sees Saet-byul as a threat and wants her fired. However, Saet-byul's girlfriends defend her actions in saving Yeon-joo. Dae-hyun realizes Saet-byul is not a troublemaker; he convinces Yeon-joo to let the matter go. However, Yeon-joo's insecurities and misunderstandings between the two only intensify. Yeon-joo privately speaks to Saet-byul, asking her to leave to save their relationship. Saet-byul complies and tells Dae-hyun she's leaving for better financial opportunities.

At the most inconvenient time, Saet-byul and Eun-byul became homeless due to a real estate scam. It is also around this time that Eun-byul has the chance to become a pop star. Desperate to realize her dreams, she takes all of Saet-byul's money to pay for a fake parent to weasel her way into the talent agency, leaving Saet-byul penniless. She bumps into Dae-hyun's mom, who invites Saet-byul to stay with them. When Saet-byul realizes something was happening between Yeon-joo and Seung-joon, she warns Yeon-joo that she'll compete for Dae-hyun if she doesn't realize his value. Yeon-joo wants to repair things with Dae-hyun, but it goes south after she learns Saet-byul is staying in Dae-hyun's home. With Yeon-joo's mom shaming Dae-hyun's family for their poverty and lack of trust in their relationship, Yeon-joo breaks up with Dae-hyun.

Saet-byul feels she has inconvenienced the Choi family enough and moves out, but she has trouble finding a stable job and a place to stay. Her friends can only give her temporary shelter due to detractors seeing her as a problem; Dae-hyun's mom convinces her to stay with them for the time being. Dae-hyun rehires Saet-byul and promotes her to store manager. With Yeon-joo no longer in the picture, Saet-byul enjoys the opportunity to get closer to Dae-hyun. As they both work to make the store profitable again, Dae-hyun starts to have feelings for Saet-byul. Seeing how she never completed her high school education, Dae-hyun helps Saet-byul in her GED studies. Just as things are warming up between the two, Yeon-joo comes back into their lives.

Yeon-joo discovers the reason Dae-hyun left GS Corporate was that Seung-joon encouraged him to take the fall. She feels guilty and wants to make things up for Dae-hyun, but he makes it clear he's already moved on and doesn't want to be involved with her. Determined to elevate Dae-hyun's position, she makes arrangements for Dae-hyun to meet Chairman Jo. The plan works, and the chairman wants to make Dae-hyun a corporate advisor. Yeon-joo informs Dae-hyun about the good news, but he doesn't want to get involved with such matters ever again.

Meanwhile, Eun-byul has made her debut in the group Fancy Girls, but her career is under threat. The same delinquents who tried to rob Yeon-joo take compromising photos of Eun-byul; they demand money from her or threaten to use the photos to destroy her career. The delinquent trio intend to visit Saet-byul at the store for money, but they get scared when they see the police talking to her. Believing the law is looking for them, they decide to release all their footage to destroy Saet-byul and Eun-byul. News of the Jung Sisters catching fire spread through social media. The reporter who was investigating this matter gets frustrated as someone releases the news ahead of her; she piggybacks on the news and confirms it.

Their reputations are now tarnished; Eun-byul is forced to leave Fancy Girls, and the locals fear Saet-byul. Dae-hyun believes in Saet-byul and advises that facing the problem with honesty will fix everything. Inspired by Dae-hyun's words, Saet-byul finds the delinquents on their turf. She defeats the red-haired bully and takes her cell phone. Saet-byul gives the reporter the phone and asks her to clear the names of the people involved in the scandal. Saet-byul meets up with Eun-byul after she left Fancy Girls in shame. Despite the wild accusations, Dae-hyun's mom offers them shelter. The reporter eventually publishes the truth, correcting all misunderstandings, and Eun-byul returns to the group. Aware of the job offer at corporate, Saet-byul encourages Dae-hyun to accept the new position. However, he collapses due to exhaustion; HQ sends employees to help him manage the store while he's away, but the new staff doesn't get along with Saet-byul, as Yeon-joo wants to get rid of her.

Dae-hyun makes his feelings clear; he wants to be with Saet-byul, but she wants to answer him once she gets the results of her GED. However, they can't help treating each other as boyfriend and girlfriend. Yeon-joo can sense the romantic development between the two and starts forming better relations with Dae-hyun's mom as a counter. Dae-hyun's mom pressures him to look for a chance to get back together with Yeon-joo; he only accepts Yeon-joo's apology and leaves things platonic. Disappointed that he would squander such a chance, Saet-byul feels guilty that mother and son would fight over the matter. Saet-byul talks to Dae-hyun's mom; she fears for Dae-hyun's future and wants her son to have a better life. Although Dae-hyun tells Saet-byul not to take matters to heart, she quietly leaves the Choi family with a farewell letter; she hopes Dae-hyun will have a better future with Yeon-joo.

Devastated over Saet-byul's departure, Dae-hyun is desperate to find her. With his friend's help, Dae-hyun finds Saet-byul working at a farm on the city outskirts. Rather than pressure her to come back, Dae-hyun says he'll wait for her return. Dae-hyun will break the news to his parents that Saet-byul has left. Baffled at first, Dae-hyun's mom realizes her words pushed her away. Dae-hyun has a private dinner with Yeon-joo; he intends to resign and return to the store. He also makes it clear he won't take Yeon-joo back; this prompts her to resign from GS25 and take a job in the US for a fresh start. Saet-byul returns to Sinseong-dong and learns that she passed her GED exam and that Dae-hyun has resigned. On her first day at the store, Dae-hyun is hiring, and Saet-byul comes in to apply. Saet-byul later answers his question (from his confession earlier) with a "yes" to being together. The story ends with Dae-hyun's friend declaring he will make their story into a webcomic called Backstreet Rookie, and the two of them finally kiss.

== Cast ==
=== Main ===
- Ji Chang-wook as Choi Dae-hyun

A 29-year-old convenience store manager with a tall and hunky appearance that makes every woman turn around. He is a little bit clumsy and weird despite his cold appearance. He is kind and sympathizes with others and gets too immersed in someone else's situation. His customers mostly are school fangirls who left him once Yeon-joo accidentally called him once.

- Kim You-jung as Jung Saet-byul

The owner of a four-dimensional character, yet refreshing beauty. Even though she has amazing athletic ability and great fighting skills, she is a 22-year-old young woman who loves flowers, her friends and enjoys retro-sensational songs and fashion.

- Han Sun-hwa as Yoo Yeon-joo

Dae-hyun's girlfriend and former boss, also a convenience store headquarter's Public Relations team leader. A 31-year-old career woman with intelligence, beauty and abilities. She is the daughter of the second-largest shareholder of the convenience store head office, but has been admitted with skill and has been promoted with clear results.

- Do Sang-woo as Jo Seung-joon

The son of the convenience store's owner and currently the convenience store's head office director. He has been properly educated since childhood. He is the next leader of the company.

- Ahn Sol-bin as Jung Eun-byul

19 years old, Saet-byul's younger sister. A beautiful high school girl who harbors the dream of becoming an artist.

- Kim Min-kyu as Kang Ji-uk

"Puppy". 22-year-old actor and rising star. Saet-byul's elementary school friend. He became an instant celebrity when he single-handedly stopped a robbery in a convenience store while working as a part-timer. Thanks to his handsome appearance, he is a next-generation national star who captures the hearts of many with politeness and sincerity.

=== Supporting ===
==== People around Dae-hyun ====
- Kim Sun-young as Gong Boon-hee

58 years old, Dae-hyun's mother.

- Lee Byung-joon as Choi Yong-pil

58 years old, Dae-hyun's father, and previously 4 Heavenly Kings band's singer.

- Eum Moon-suk as Han Dal-shik

29 years old, Dae-hyun's close friend, a webtoon writer.

- Kim Ji-hyun as Choi Dae-soon

38 years old, Dae-hyun's older sister.

==== People around Saet-byul ====
- Seo Ye-hwa as Hwang Geum-bi

22 years old, Saet-byul's close friend.

- Yoon Soo as Cha Eun-jo

22 years old, Saet-byul's close friend.

==== 4 Heavenly Kings band members ====
- Woo Hyun as Kwon Eui-choo

58 years old, the former guitarist of the band 4 Heavenly Kings, and owns a restaurant in Busan.

- Lee Yoon-hee as Cha Ki-bok

58 years old, the former keyboardist of the band 4 Heavenly Kings.

- Bae Gi-bum as Go Kwang-tae

58 years old, the former drummer of the band 4 Heavenly Kings.

==== Others ====
- Kyeon Mi-ri as Kim Hye-ja

60 years old, Yeon-joo's mother.

- Kil Yong-woo as Yoo Myung-gi

60 years old, Yeon-joo's father, a university professor.

- Heo Jae-ho as Department Head Bae
- Ji Chan as Kang Sung-tae
- Shin Yoon-jung as Kim Jung-ha
- Lee Ju-ha as Oh Hyun-ji

=== Special appearances ===
- Park Jin-joo as a high school student

A gang leader who unsuccessfully tries to recruit Saet-byul into her group.

- Jung Eun-ji as Jung-eun

Dae-hyun's ex-girlfriend.

- Ko Kyu-pil as Oh Yo-han

A YouTuber who broadcasts from the convenience store where he works.

- Lee Yu-bi as a customer
- Lee Jun-young as a customer

A minor who tries to buy cigarettes.

- Jung Joon-ho as himself

A customer.

- Ryu Seung-soo as Jung Chul-min

Saet-byul and Eun-byul's father.

- Kim Se-yong as a chicken shop employee
- Ahn Chang-hwan as Song-sac

A convenience store part-time work interviewee.

- Tak Jae-hoon as adult webtoon PD
- Kim Hyung-mook as Dae-soon's husband
- Park Chul-min as a tarot reader
- Yeom Hae-in as a Mega Hit trainee

Trainee of the same debut group as Eun-byul.

- Jung Ae-yeon as Hwang Eun-ha

Entertainment reporter.

- Lee Yeon-kyung as Hong Jang-mi

Yong-pil's first love and Boon-hee's friend.

- Jang Ga-hyun as Mega Hit management team leader
- Yoohyeon and Jung Yoo-jun as arcade customers
- Im Ha-ryong as Han Dal-pyung

Dal-shik's father.

- Park Sang-myun

High school dean (Ep. 2, 4)

- Lee Ahyumi

Salon customer (Ep. 16)

== Production ==
The first script-reading was held in February 2020. The series is directed by Myoungwoo Lee of hit series The Fiery Priest (2019).

The main cast (Ji Chang-wook, Kim You-jung, Han Sun-hwa and Do Sang-woo) appeared on the 507th episode of the variety show Running Man to promote the series.

== Original soundtrack ==
Singles from the soundtrack of the series were released from June 19 to July 25, 2020, under the record label of Dreamus and MOSTCONTENTS:

Part 1

Released on June 19, 2020
No.	Title	Lyrics	Music	Artist	Length
1.	"Something"	Hana; Yejun	Han Soo-seok; Yejun; Lee Ha-eun; Jung Sung-min (POPKID); Shin Yong-soo	Kang Daniel	3:21
2.	"Something" (Inst.)		Han Soo-seok; Yejun; Lee Ha-eun; Jung Sung-min (POPKID); Shin Yong-soo		3:21
Total length:					6:42

Part 2

Released on June 26, 2020
No.	Title	Lyrics	Music	Artist	Length
1.	"Crazy"	Lee Myoungwoo; Major Leaguer	Major Leaguer	April	3:48
2.	"Crazy" (Inst.)		Major Leaguer		3:48
Total length:					7:36

Part 3

Released on June 27, 2020
No.	Title	Lyrics	Music	Artist	Length
1.	"Love Ya"	Kim Tae-woo	Lee Hyun-seung; TM	Kim Tae-woo (g.o.d)	3:04
2.	"Love Ya" (Inst.)		Lee Hyun-seung; TM		3:04
Total length:					6:08

Part 4

Released on July 4, 2020
No.	Title	Lyrics	Music	Artist	Length
1.	"Sleepless Night" (잠이 오지 않는 밤에)	Gaemi; Lmokulsra; CLEF CREW	Lmokulsra; CLEF CREW	Rothy	4:21
2.	"Sleepless Night" (Inst.)		Lmokulsra; CLEF CREW		4:21
Total length:					8:42

Part 5

Released on July 11, 2020
No.	Title	Lyrics	Music	Artist	Length
1.	"Treasure" (보물)	Colde	Colde; Johnny; Chiic	Colde	3:43
2.	"Treasure" (Inst.)		Colde; Johnny; Chiic		3:43
Total length:					7:26

Part 6

Released on July 17, 2020
No.	Title	Lyrics	Music	Artist	Length
1.	"See Saw" (시소)	Park Kyung	Park Kyung; LEEZ; Aroze	Park Kyung (Block B), SeolA (Cosmic Girls)	3:25
2.	"See Saw" (Inst.)		Park Kyung; LEEZ; Aroze		3:25
Total length:					6:50

Part 7

Released on July 25, 2020
No.	Title	Lyrics	Music	Artist	Length
1.	"I'll Miss You"	Lee Myoungwoo	Gaemi	Lim Ji-woo	3:39
2.	"I'll Miss You" (Inst.)		Gaemi		3:39
Total length:					7:18

== Reception ==
=== Criticism ===
The show has faced heavy criticism for sexually suggestive scenes as well as characters depicting objectionable scenes. The show has also been accused of plagiarism.

The Korea Communications Standards Commission issued a warning to the show for airing provocative and inappropriate scenes. The KCSC noted that "in the process of producing an R-rated webtoon into a TV series with a rating of 15 years old and older, the drama production team has shown that it lacks consideration in portraying different genders and produced content that can cause viewers discomfort and aversion". The KCSC has received over 7,000 complaints about inappropriate scenes in the show.

== Viewership ==
Backstreet Rookie : South Korea viewers per episode (millions)

Episodes	Episode number															
Episodes	1	2	3	4	5	6	7	8	9	10	11	12	13	14	15	16
1–16	0.879	1.203	N/A	1.378	0.904	1.232	0.932	1.650	0.955	1.194	1.138	1.755	0.979	1.285	1.056	1.669
17–32	1.162	1.490	1.142	1.762	1.210	1.558	1.002	1.635	1.213	1.581	1.172	1.791	1.103	1.390	1.239	1.863

Source: Audience measurement performed nationwide by Nielsen Media Research.

Ep.	Part	Original broadcast date	Average audience share		
Ep.	Part	Original broadcast date	Nielsen Korea		TNmS
Ep.	Part	Original broadcast date	Nationwide	Seoul	Nationwide
1	1	June 19, 2020	4.8% (19th)	5.4% (16th)	N/A
1	2	June 19, 2020	6.3% (11th)	6.6% (9th)	5.2% (18th)
2	1	June 20, 2020	3.7% (NR)	4.1% (NR)	N/A
2	2	June 20, 2020	6.8% (9th)	7.3% (8th)	6.1% (14th)
3	1	June 26, 2020	4.9% (19th)	5.3% (18th)	N/A
3	2	June 26, 2020	6.7% (9th)	7.4% (8th)	6.0% (15th)
4	1	June 27, 2020	4.6% (NR)	5.3% (20th)	N/A
4	2	June 27, 2020	8.3% (6th)	9.4% (4th)	8.0% (9th)
5	1	July 3, 2020	4.6% (20th)	4.7% (20th)	N/A
5	2	July 3, 2020	5.8% (16th)	6.0% (12th)	6.2% (14th)
6	1	July 4, 2020	4.9% (NR)	N/A	N/A
6	2	July 4, 2020	7.9% (7th)	8.7% (6th)	8.0% (8th)
7	1	July 10, 2020	4.8% (NR)	5.4% (19th)	N/A
7	2	July 10, 2020	6.6% (12th)	7.5% (8th)	5.0% (18th)
8	1	July 11, 2020	5.5% (NR)	6.2% (13th)	N/A
8	2	July 11, 2020	8.7% (6th)	9.8% (3rd)	7.6% (10th)
9	1	July 17, 2020	6.1% (13th)	6.6% (10th)	4.9% (20th)
9	2	July 17, 2020	7.7% (9th)	8.7% (7th)	6.1% (13th)
10	1	July 18, 2020	5.3% (NR)	5.8% (16th)	N/A
10	2	July 18, 2020	8.4% (5th)	8.7% (5th)	8.0% (7th)
11	1	July 24, 2020	6.1% (15th)	6.9% (12th)	5.1% (20th)
11	2	July 24, 2020	7.7% (10th)	8.6% (8th)	6.1% (15th)
12	1	July 25, 2020	4.8% (NR)	N/A	N/A
12	2	July 25, 2020	7.6% (8th)	7.8% (7th)	7.4% (12th)
13	1	July 31, 2020	5.7% (15th)	5.7% (15th)	N/A
13	2	July 31, 2020	7.4% (11th)	7.5% (10th)	6.2% (12th)
14	1	August 1, 2020	5.4% (20th)	5.9% (16th)	N/A
14	2	August 1, 2020	8.0% (7th)	8.6% (6th)	7.4% (10th)
15	1	August 7, 2020	5.2% (18th)	5.9% (18th)	5.3% (20th)
15	2	August 7, 2020	6.9% (12th)	7.6% (9th)	6.6% (12th)
16	1	August 8, 2020	6.3% (15th)	6.9% (12th)	N/A
16	2	August 8, 2020	9.5% (5th)	10.7% (5th)	8.8% (7th)
Average			6.3%	— (Note: Due to some ratings not recorded, the exact average rating is unknown.)	—

== Awards and nominations ==
Name of the award ceremony, year presented, category, nominee of the award, and the result of the nomination
Award ceremony	Year	Category	Nominee / Work	Result	Ref.
APAN Star Awards	2020	Excellence Award, Actor in a Miniseries	Ji Chang-wook	Nominated	
APAN Star Awards	2020	Excellence Award, Actress in a Miniseries	Kim You-jung	Nominated	
APAN Star Awards	2020	Best Supporting Actress	Kim Sun-young	Won	
SBS Drama Awards	2020	Top Excellence Award, Actor in a Miniseries Fantasy/Romance Drama	Ji Chang-wook	Nominated	
SBS Drama Awards	2020	Excellence Award, Actress in a Miniseries Fantasy/Romance Drama	Kim You-jung	Won	
SBS Drama Awards	2020	Excellence Award, Actress in a Miniseries Fantasy/Romance Drama	Han Sun-hwa	Nominated	
SBS Drama Awards	2020	Best Couple Award	Ji Chang-wook and Kim You-jung	Nominated	
SBS Drama Awards	2020	Best New Actress	Seo Ye-hwa	Nominated	
