= The Chaser (TV series) =

2012 South Korean television drama series

- Promotional poster
- Hangul: 추적자
- Hanja: 追跡者
- RR: Chujeokja
- MR: Ch'ujŏkcha
- Genre: Action; Thriller; Procedural
- Created by: SBS TV
- Written by: Park Kyung-soo
- Directed by: Jo Nam-kook; Jin Hyuk; Jo Young-kwang
- Creative director: Lee Jung-heum
- Starring: Son Hyun-joo; Kim Sang-joong
- Composer: Park Se-joon
- Country of origin: South Korea
- Original language: Korean
- No. of episodes: 16 + 2 specials

Production
- Executive producer: Lee Hyun-jin
- Producers: Kyung Min-Suk; Lee Sung-hoon; Park Sun-jae
- Cinematography: Kim Dae-kwon; Jung Ki-Hyun
- Editor: Bang Soo-yun
- Camera setup: Single-camera
- Running time: 60 min
- Production companies: The Chaser SPC; Kim Jong-hak Production

Original release
- Network: SBS TV
- Release: 28 May – 15 July 2012

The Chaser (Korean: 추적자; RR: Chujeokja) is a 2012 South Korean television drama series about a grieving father out for revenge against corrupt officials.

Despite no hype or big stars, the thriller gave a strong performance in the ratings, ending its run at 22.1% (number one in its timeslot). Its rise in popularity was based on the tightly written and well-structured storyline, solid direction, and cast members' acting skills.

== Plot ==
The series tells the story of Detective Baek Hong-suk, a happily married family man whose life is shattered when his 15-year-old daughter is killed in a car accident, causing his wife to go into a state of shock, eventually killing herself and leaving Hong-suk a widower. He later discovers his daughter's death was the result of a conspiracy led by politician Kang Dong-yoon, to secure his political future as a presidential candidate. Hong-suk goes from loving, doting father and cop to harrowed man hellbent on revenge, as Kang continues to rise in power. With the help of Kang's sister-in-law, a reporter, Hong-suk takes revenge against the man who ruined his life.

== Cast ==
=== Main ===
- Son Hyun-joo as Detective Baek Hong-suk
- Kim Sang-joong as Presidential candidate Kang Dong-yoon

=== Supporting ===
- Go Joon-hee as Reporter Seo Ji-won
- Kim Sung-ryung as Seo Ji-soo
- Ryu Seung-soo as Choi Jung-woo
- Park Hyo-joo as Detective Jo
- Kang Shin-il as Squad Chief Detective Hwang
- Lee Yong-woo as PK Joon
- Jang Shin-young as Shin Hye-ra
- Lee Hye-in as Baek Soo-jung (Hong-suk's and Mi-yeon's daughter)
- Kim Do-yeon as Song Mi-yeon
- Jo Jae-yoon as Park Yong-sik
- Choi Joon-young as Yoon Chang-min
- Lee Re as Yoon Chang-min's daughter
- Park Geun-hyung as Company president Seo
- Jeon No-min as Seo Young-wook
- Nam Da-reum as Kang Min-sung
- Jeon Gook-hwan as Jang Byung-ho
- Song Jae-ho as Yoo Tae-jin
- Ryohei Otani as Bae Sang-moo
- Kim Min-ha as Hyo-jin

=== Special appearance ===
- Lee Jung-gil as Jo Dong-soo
- Jung Soo-in as Choi's secretary
- Jo Young-jin as Kim Chang-jae

== Original soundtracks ==
The Chaser OST Album

Soundtrack album by Various Artists
- Released: 10 July 2012
- Genre: Soundtrack
- Length: 23:01
- Language: Korean
- Label: Sony Music (소니뮤직)

=== The Chaser OST ===
| No. | Title | Artist | Length |
|---|---|---|---|
| 1. | "Saying "I Love You" (Acoustic Ver.)" (사랑한다는 이 말 (Acoustic Ver.)) | The One | 4:30 |
| 2. | "Lily" (나리꽃) | Lee Hye-in | 5:40 |
| 3. | "A Dream (Drama Ver.)" (꿈 (Drama Ver.)) | The One | 3:46 |
| 4. | "Good Person" (좋은 사람) | Ivy | 4:15 |
| 5. | "Saying "I Love You"" (사랑한다는 이 말) | The One | 4:31 |
| 6. | "Callus" (굳은살) | Kim Bum-soo | 4:08 |
| 7. | "A Dream" (꿈) | The One | 3:30 |
| 8. | "The Chaser (Opening Title)" | Various Artists | 1:58 |
| 9. | "Father's Original Story" (아버지 (Original Story)) | Various Artists | 3:11 |
| 10. | "Black Box" | Various Artists | 2:17 |
| 11. | "The Truth is Far Away" (진실은 멀어진다) | Various Artists | 2:03 |
| 12. | "Lily Guitar Story" (나리꽃 Guitar Story) | Various Artists | 1:54 |
| 13. | "Wait for Kang Dong-yoon" (기다려라 강동윤) | Various Artists | 3:33 |
| 14. | "Devil's Tears (Father's Sad Trumpet Story)" (악마의 눈물 (아버지 Sad Trumpet Story)) | Various Artists | 2:15 |
| 15. | "I Run" (나는 달린다) | Various Artists | 1:46 |
| 16. | "Jin-soo (Father's Guitar Story)" (지수야 (아버지 Guitar Story)) | Various Artists | 1:42 |
| 17. | "I'm Sorry" (미안합니다) | Various Artists | 3:32 |
| 18. | "Counterstrike" | Various Artists | 1:42 |
| 19. | "Hong Seok-Yi's Dream" (홍석이의 꿈) | Various Artists | 2:54 |
| 20. | "In Front of a Corpse" (주검앞에서) | Various Artists | 3:00 |
| 21. | "The Beginning of Revenge" (복수의 시작) | Various Artists | 1:37 |
| 22. | "The Dreams of the Poor" (가난한 자들의 꿈) | Various Artists | 2:22 |
| 23. | "A Lonely Fight" (외로운 싸움) | Various Artists | 1:47 |
| 24. | "The Chairman (Father's Waltz Story)" (The Chairman (아버지 Waltz Story)) | Various Artists | 3:08 |
| Total length: | | | 23:01 |

The Chaser OST Special

Soundtrack album by Heo Gong (허공)
- Released: 17 July 2012
- Genre: Soundtrack
- Length: 7:04
- Language: Korean
- Label: Sony Music (소니뮤직)

=== The Chaser OST Special ===
| No. | Title | Artist | Length |
|---|---|---|---|
| 1. | "How Can I Forget You?" (어찌 너를 잊어요) | Heo Gong (허공) | 3:32 |
| 2. | "How Can I Forget You? (Inst.)" (어찌 너를 잊어요 (Inst.)) | | 3:32 |
| Total length: | | | 07:04 |

== Ratings ==
- In the table below, the blue numbers represent the lowest ratings and the red numbers represent the highest ratings.
- NR denotes that the drama did not rank in the top 20 daily programs on that date.

| Episode # | Original broadcast date | Average audience share | | | |
| Episode # | Original broadcast date | TNmS Ratings | | AGB Nielsen | |
| Episode # | Original broadcast date | Nationwide | Seoul National Capital Area | Nationwide | Seoul National Capital Area |
|---|---|---|---|---|---|
| 1 | 28 May 2012 | 10.0% | 12.6% | 9.3% (13th) | 10.3% (8th) |
| 2 | 29 May 2012 | 10.9% | 13.5% | 9.9% (9th) | 11.0% (6th) |
| 3 | 4 June 2012 | 11.6% | 14.7% | 9.2% (16th) | 9.7% (11th) |
| 4 | 5 June 2012 | 11.5% | 14.1% | 9.8% (9th) | 10.3% (9th) |
| 5 | 11 June 2012 | 13.2% | 16.5% | 10.6% (7th) | 10.7% (7th) |
| 6 | 12 June 2012 | 12.5% | 15.1% | 11.1% (5th) | 11.9% (4th) |
| 7 | 18 June 2012 | 13.2% | 14.5% | 11.5% (5th) | 12.4% (4th) |
| 8 | 19 June 2012 | 13.2% | 14.1% | 13.3% (4th) | 14.2% (4th) |
| 9 | 25 June 2012 | 13.6% | 16.3% | 12.4% (4th) | 13.1% (4th) |
| 10 | 26 June 2012 | 13.8% | 15.8% | 13.2% (4th) | 14.2% (4th) |
| 11 | 2 July 2012 | 14.0% | 15.9% | 13.1% (4th) | 13.9% (4th) |
| 12 | 3 July 2012 | 15.3% | 16.2% | 13.5% (4th) | 14.3% (4th) |
| 13 | 9 July 2012 | 20.0% | 22.4% | 17.9% (3rd) | 19.7% (3rd) |
| 14 | 10 July 2012 | 23.1% | 26.7% | 20.7% (3rd) | 22.3% (2nd) |
| 15 | 16 July 2012 | 22.1% | 26.6% | 20.4% (3rd) | 21.5% (1st) |
| 16 | 17 July 2012 | 25.1% | 28.3% | 22.6% (2nd) | 23.8% (1st) |
| Average | | 15.2% | 17.7% | 13.7% | 14.6% |

== Awards and nominations ==
| Year | Award | Category | Recipient | Result |
|---|---|---|---|---|
| 2012 | 5th Korea Drama Awards | Best Drama | The Chaser | Nominated |
| 2012 | 5th Korea Drama Awards | Top Excellence Award, Actor | Son Hyun-joo | Nominated |
| 2012 | 5th Korea Drama Awards | Top Excellence Award, Actor | Kim Sang-joong | Won |
| 2012 | 5th Korea Drama Awards | Excellence Award, Actress | Jang Shin-young | Nominated |
| 2012 | 1st K-Drama Star Awards | Grand Prize (Daesang) | Son Hyun-joo | Won |
| 2012 | 1st K-Drama Star Awards | Top Excellence Award, Actor | Kim Sang-joong | Nominated |
| 2012 | 25th Grimae Awards | Excellence Award in Visuals | Jung Ki-hyun, Kim Dae-kwon | Won |
| 2012 | 20th Korean Culture and Entertainment Awards | Popularity Award, Drama category | Go Joon-hee | Won |
| 2012 | SBS Drama Awards | Grand Prize (Daesang) | Son Hyun-joo | Won |
| 2012 | SBS Drama Awards | Top Excellence Award, Actor in a Miniseries | Son Hyun-joo | Nominated |
| 2012 | SBS Drama Awards | Excellence Award, Actor in a Miniseries | Kim Sang-joong | Won |
| 2012 | SBS Drama Awards | Excellence Award, Actress in a Miniseries | Kim Sung-ryung | Won |
| 2012 | SBS Drama Awards | Special Acting Award, Actor in a Miniseries | Ryu Seung-soo | Nominated |
| 2012 | SBS Drama Awards | Special Acting Award, Actor in a Miniseries | Jo Jae-yoon | Nominated |
| 2012 | SBS Drama Awards | Special Acting Award, Actress in a Miniseries | Jang Shin-young | Won |
| 2012 | SBS Drama Awards | Special Acting Award, Actress in a Miniseries | Kim Do-yeon | Nominated |
| 2012 | SBS Drama Awards | Producers' Award | Park Geun-hyung | Won |
| 2012 | SBS Drama Awards | Top 10 Stars | Son Hyun-joo | Won |
| 2012 | SBS Drama Awards | New Star Award | Park Hyo-joo | Won |
| 2012 | SBS Drama Awards | New Star Award | Go Joon-hee | Won |
| 2012 | 24th Korean PD Awards | Best Drama | The Chaser | Won |
| 2013 | 49th Baeksang Arts Awards | Best Drama | The Chaser | Won |
| 2013 | 49th Baeksang Arts Awards | Best Actor (TV) | Son Hyun-joo | Won |
| 2013 | 49th Baeksang Arts Awards | Best Director (TV) | Jo Nam-kook | Nominated |
| 2013 | 49th Baeksang Arts Awards | Best Screenplay (TV) | Park Kyung-soo | Won |
| 2013 | 40th Korea Broadcasting Awards | Best Mid-length Drama | The Chaser | Won |
| 2013 | 40th Korea Broadcasting Awards | Best Actor | Son Hyun-joo | Won |
| 2013 | 40th Korea Broadcasting Awards | Best Screenwriter | Park Kyung-soo | Won |
| 2013 | 7th Seoul International Drama Awards | Silver Bird Prize (Runner-up, Best Series Drama) | The Chaser | Won |

== International broadcast ==
It aired in Japan on cable channel KNTV from 20 September – 8 November 2013, and was re-aired on cable channel BS-Fuji.

It aired in Thailand on Workpoint TV in midyear 2015.
