= Boyhood (TV series) =

2023 South Korean television series

- Promotional poster
- Hangul: 소년시대
- Lit.: Boys' Generation
- RR: Sonyeonsidae
- MR: Sonyŏnsidae
- Genre: Teen comedy
- Developed by: Kim Seong-han
- Written by: Kim Jae-hwan
- Directed by: Lee Myung-woo
- Starring: Im Si-wan; Lee Sun-bin; Lee Si-woo; Kang Hye-won
- Music by: Gae-mi
- Country of origin: South Korea
- Original language: Korean
- No. of episodes: 10

Production
- Executive producer: Ahn Hye-yeon
- Producers: Eugene Oh; Woo Se-jin; Lee Yu-kyung
- Production company: The Studio M

Original release
- Network: Coupang Play
- Release: November 24 – December 22, 2023

Boyhood (Korean: 소년시대) is a 2023 South Korean streaming television series starring Yim Si-wan, Lee Sun-bin, Lee Si-woo and Kang Hye-won. It aired on Coupang Play in South Korea from November 24 to December 22, 2023, and released two episodes every Friday at 20:00 (KST).

== Synopsis ==
Set in the backdrop of the mid-to-late 1980s, the drama tells the story of students at an agricultural high school in Chungcheong Province. Jang Byung Tae is a small and weak boy living in Onyang in South Chungcheong Province. He is at the bottom of the school's social ladder so he transfers to the neighboring Buyeo Agricultural High School. There, he faces an unexpected incident that becomes a turning point in his life.

== Cast ==
=== Main ===
- Yim Si-wan as Jang Byeong-tae

A loner who was misunderstood as a "Jeong Gyeong Tae" on the first day of school transfer.

- Lee Sun-bin as Park Ji-young

A black spider of Buyeo.

- Lee Si-woo as Jeong Gyeong-tae

The Asan white tiger who conquered the local schools.

- Kang Hye-won as Kang Seon-hwa

A high school girl who shakes the hearts of Gyeong-tae and all the male students, raising curiosity.

=== Supporting ===
- Joo In-young as Kim Mi-yeong

Byeong-tae's mother.

- Seo Dong-gyu as Yu Seung-ho

Byeong-tae's classmate and a member of Buyeo Agricultural High School gang.

- Seo Hyun-chul as Jang Hak-su

Byeong-tae's father who ran an illegal dance class and made his family suffer for the fifth time.

- Kim Jung-jin as Yang Cheol-hong

leader of Buyeo Agricultural High School gang.

- Lee Sang-jin as Jo Ho-seok

Byeong-tae's friend and is in conflict with Gyeong-tae.

== Episodes ==
No.	Title	Directed by	Written by	Original release date
1	"Crouching Tiger, Hidden Dragon: The Beginning of the Legend"	Lee Myung-woo	Kim Jae-hwan	November 24, 2023
Byeong-tae, a loser from Onyang, transfers to Buyeo, and is anxious about adapting to the new school. However, the students he met at the school he transferred to only pay attention to Byeongtae.
2	"My Love, Don't Cross That River"	Lee Myung-woo	Kim Jae-hwan	November 24, 2023
Byeong-tae tries to tell him that he is being mistaken for the legendary fighter 'Asan Baekho', but he misses the opportunity. Meanwhile, he saves Buyeo's queen, Seonhwa, from an awkward situation.
3	"You Can't Stop Them"	Lee Myung-woo	Kim Jae-hwan	December 1, 2023
Iljin, who lost Seon-hwa to Byeong-tae, comes to the agricultural high school to have a fight with Byeong-tae. Byeongtae and Iljin are enraged by this and prepare for a large-scale war against Buyeo Technical High School.
4	"One Fine Spring Day"	Lee Myung-woo	Kim Jae-hwan	December 1, 2023
Gyeongtae transferred to the same class. Byeong-tae senses that he is the Asan White Tiger. Meanwhile, someone comes to visit Byeong-tae, who is on a sweet date with Seon-hwa.
5	"Love and War"	Lee Myung-woo	Kim Jae-hwan	December 8, 2023
Ji-young advises Byeong-tae not to run for student council president, but Byeong-tae ignores this. Meanwhile, there is someone who upsets Byeong-tae.
6	"Everything, Everywhere, All at Once"	Lee Myung-woo	Kim Jae-hwan	December 8, 2023
The real Asan White Tiger is revealed, and bloodshed begins to blow in Buyeo Farm. The condition of returning to life as a loser. In such a condition, love and friendship become increasingly dangerous.
7	"Even though I Hate You, Once Again"	Lee Myung-woo	Kim Jae-hwan	December 15, 2023
Byeong-tae loses everything, but Gyeong-tae runs for student council president, throws a huge birthday party, and even wins Seon-hwa. Meanwhile, the long-awaited election day for student council president is approaching.
8	"A Bloody Battle for Revenge"	Lee Myung-woo	Kim Jae-hwan	December 15, 2023
Byeong-tae's father is framed and taken to the police station, but Byeong-tae can do nothing. In the end, Byeong-tae decides to increase his strength for revenge, and Ji-young helps Byeong-tae.
9	"The Foul King"	Lee Myung-woo	Kim Jae-hwan	December 22, 2023
Byeong-tae's amazing revenge, hidden behind the mask, begins. Byeong-tae receives special tutoring from Ji-young and begins a one-on-one strategy to defeat the farmers.
10	"Six Flying Dragons"	Lee Myung-woo	Kim Jae-hwan	December 22, 2023
Jiyoung is worried as she sees her injury getting worse. Meanwhile, Byeong-tae comes up with a trick to beat Asan Baekho. Will Byeongtae's revenge be successful?

== Accolades ==
=== Awards and nominations ===
Name of the award ceremony, year presented, category, nominee of the award, and the result of the nomination
Award ceremony	Year	Category	Nominee / Work	Result	Ref.
Asia Contents Awards & Global OTT Awards	2024	Best OTT Original	Boyhood	Won	
Asia Contents Awards & Global OTT Awards	2024	Best Lead Actor	Im Si-wan	Nominated	
Baeksang Arts Awards	2024	Best Director	Lee Myung-woo	Nominated	
Baeksang Arts Awards	2024	Best Actor	Im Si-wan	Nominated	
Baeksang Arts Awards	2024	Best New Actor	Lee Si-woo	Nominated	
Blue Dragon Series Awards	2024	Best Actor	Im Si-wan	Won	
Blue Dragon Series Awards	2024	Best New Actor	Lee Siwoo	Nominated	
ContentAsia Awards	2024	Best Director of a Scripted TV Programme	Lee Myung-woo	Won; Silver Award	
Korea Drama Awards	2025	Top Excellence Award, Actor	Im Si-wan	Won	
Korea Drama Awards	2025	Best New Actor	Lee Siwoo	Won	
Korea Drama Awards	2025	Best New Actress	Kang Hye-won	Won	

=== Listicles ===
Name of publisher, year listed, name of listicle, and placement
Publisher	Year	Listicle	Placement	Ref.
Cine21	2024	Top 10 Series of 2024	5th place	
