= Pan Entertainment =

South Korean TV production company

Pan Entertainment Co., Ltd.
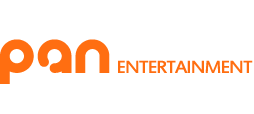
- Type: Public
- Traded as: KRX: 068050
- Industry: entertainment and media production
- Founded: April 3, 1998, as HS Media Co., Ltd.
- Headquarters: The PAN, World Cup-buk-ro 58-gil, Mapo-gu, Seoul, South Korea
- Area served: South Korea
- Key people: Park Jong-sul, Moon Jung-soo (president); Park Young-seok (CEO); Kim Hee-yeol (vice-president and head of drama production)
- Products: Korean dramas
- Services: Production
- Revenue: 53 billion won (Q1 of 2014)
- Operating income: 500 million won (Q1 of 2014)
- Net income: 400 million won (Q1 of 2014)
- Total equity: 4.6 billion won (2014)
- Owner: DANAL CO., LTD. (25.81%); Park Young-seok (25.26%)
- Number of employees: 33 (2014)
- Subsidiaries: Pan Stars Company (100%); Tips Commission (61%); Big I Entertainment (60%)
- Website: www.thepan.co.kr

Pan Entertainment (Korean: 팬 엔터테인먼트) is a South Korean television production company known for producing Korean dramas. It was established on April 3, 1998, under the name HS Media Co., Ltd.. Its main office, called The PAN, is located in Seoul's Mapo District.

The company's slogan is A world of magical contents (Korean: 콘텐츠 마법의 세계; RR: Kontencheu mabeobui segye).

== List of works ==
Year	Title	Network	Note(s)
2002	Winter Sonata	KBS 2TV	part of the Endless Love series
2002	Yi Je-ma, Man of the Sun	KBS 2TV	—N/a
2002	Solitude	KBS 2TV	—N/a
2003	Summer Scent	KBS 2TV	part of the Endless Love series
2003	Rose Fence	KBS 2TV	—N/a
2004	Forbidden Love	KBS 2TV	—N/a
2004	Second Proposal	KBS 2TV	—N/a
2004	Bang Bang	KBS 2TV	KBS live situation special
2005	My Rosy Life	KBS 2TV	—N/a
2005	The Secret Lovers	MBC	—N/a
2006	Famous Chil Princesses	KBS 2TV	—N/a
2006	Thank You, My Life	KBS 2TV	—N/a
2007	Unstoppable Marriage	KBS 1TV	in association with POIBOS Co. Ltd.
2007	It's Ok Because I Love You	KBS 2TV	—N/a
2007	I Am Sam	KBS 2TV	—N/a
2007	Several Questions That Make Us Happy	KBS 2TV	—N/a
2007	My Mom, Supermom	KBS 2TV	in association with Naxen Film
2008	Don't Cry My Love	MBC	—N/a
2008	The Scale of Providence	SBS	—N/a
2008	Cooking Up Romance	KBS 2TV	a/k/a Dukbaegi
2008	Women of the Sun	KBS 2TV	—N/a
2010	Brilliant Legacy	SBS	—N/a
2010	Oh! My Lady	SBS	—N/a
2010	Daring Women	SBS	—N/a
2010	Home Sweet Home	MBC	—N/a
2010	Pure Pumpkin Flower	SBS	—N/a
2011	The Duo	MBC	—N/a
2011	Indomitable Daughters-in-Law	MBC	—N/a
2012	Can Love Become Money	MBN	—N/a
2012	Moon Embracing the Sun	MBC	—N/a
2012	Man from the Equator	KBS 2TV	—N/a
2012	Bridal Mask	KBS 2TV	in association with Bridal Mask SPC and KBS N
2012	My Lover, Madame Butterfly	SBS	—N/a
2013	A Hundred Year Legacy	MBC	—N/a
2013	Passionate Love	SBS	—N/a
2014	Golden Cross	KBS 2TV	—N/a
2014	Gap-dong	tvN	—N/a
2014	Mama	MBC	—N/a
2014	4 Legendary Witches	MBC	—N/a
2015	Kill Me, Heal Me	MBC	in association with Zhejiang Huace Film & TV
2015	Heard It Through the Grapevine	SBS	replaced Paulownia starting episode 17
2015	The Dearest Lady	MBC	—N/a
2016	The Gentlemen of Wolgyesu Tailor Shop	KBS 2TV	—N/a
2016	The Doctors	SBS	—N/a
2016	Marriage Contract	MBC	—N/a
2017	Whisper	SBS	—N/a
2017	Unknown Woman	KBS 2TV	—N/a
2017	Fight for My Way	KBS 2TV	—N/a
2017	Hospital Ship	MBC	—N/a
2017	Temperature of Love	SBS	—N/a
2018	My Contracted Husband, Mr. Oh	MBC	—N/a
2019	Liver or Die	KBS2	in association with Chorokbaem Media
2019	When the Camellia Blooms	KBS2	—N/a
2019	Never Twice	MBC	—N/a
2020	Record of Youth	tvN	in association with Studio Dragon
2021	Revolutionary Sisters	KBS 2TV	in association with Chorokbaem Media
2021	Racket Boys	SBS	in association with Studio S
2021	The Second Husband	MBC	in association with MBC C&I
2022	Gaus Electronics	ENA	in association with Ling-aling
2023	The Secret Romantic Guesthouse	SBS	in association with Apollo Pictures and Studio S
2023	The Killing Vote	SBS	in association with Studio S
2024	The Whirlwind	Netflix	in association with Studio Dragon
2024	DNA Lover	TV Chosun	in association with Higround and IP Box Media
2025	When Life Gives You Tangerines	Netflix	in association with Baram Pictures

== Subsidiaries ==
=== Pan Stars Company ===
Pan Stars Company is an artist management agency owned by Pan Entertainment.

==== Artists ====
- Ryu Jin
- Tak Jae-hoon
- Kim Yoon-seo
- Ha Joo-hee
- Choi Sung-jae
- Pyo Ye-jin
- Lee In-ha
- Jeon Ye-seul
- Jung Ji-oh
- Park Joo-hyun
