= Cho Jae-hyun =

South Korean actor (born 1965)

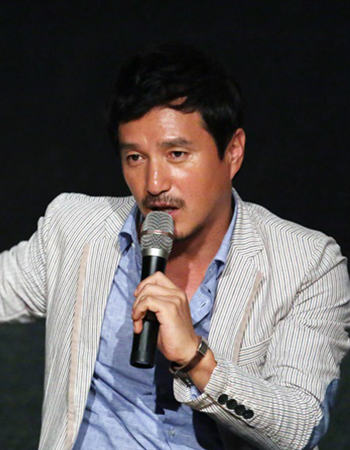
- Cho in 2017
- Born: June 30, 1965 (age 61); Gyeongju, North Gyeongsang Province, South Korea
- Education: Kyungsung University – Theater and Film; Chung-Ang University – Master's degree in Performing and Visual Media
- Occupation: Actor
- Years active: 1989–2018
- Children: 2 (incl. Cho Hye-jung)

Korean name
- Hangul: 조재현
- RR: Jo Jaehyeon
- MR: Cho Chaehyŏn

Cho Jae-hyun (born June 30, 1965) is a South Korean film, stage, and TV actor. He is commonly dubbed "director Kim Ki-duk's persona" since Cho has starred as leading and supporting characters in a number of films directed by Kim.

== Early years and education ==
Cho Jae-hyun was born in Gyeongju on June 30, 1965. He and his family lived in a poor neighborhood on the slopes of a hill until his father became successful with his restaurant business in the Jongno area, Seoul. In a 2002 interview with the film magazine Cine21, Cho said he was a rebellious boy wandering outside the home. He aspired to be a painter, so tried to enter an art high school but failed. When he entered another high school, Cho ran away from home to Busan. Cho worked as a waiter there, and studied on his own to pass a qualification exam equivalent to obtaining a high school diploma. However, Cho failed it, so returned to Seoul to finish his high school year.

Cho was admitted to study theater and film at Kyungsung University. Cho recollected he indulged himself in Busan's culture as a freshman and sophomore, then focused on theater for the rest of his university years. Cho said a question from his junior in school during his third summer break shook him to rethink about his future; "What would you do after the graduation from the school?" Cho said he felt shame at the time because he could not clearly answer the question. Therefore, Cho started dedicating himself to acting.

== Acting career ==
After graduation, Cho was selected as a TV actor by a public recruit of Korea Broadcasting System (KBS), and officially debuted as a professional actor by starring as the youngest brother of Yu In-chon in The Age of Ambition (야먕의 세월). But theater remained his main priority, as Cho and his friends established a theatrical company named "Jongak" (종각, literally "Bell Pavilion"), which produced several works on the stage such as Tricycles (세발자전거, 1989), Look Back in Anger (성난 얼굴로 돌아보라, 1990) and The Lovers of Woomook-baemi (우묵배미의 사랑, 1990). In 1991, Cho won Best New Actor in Theater at the Baeksang Arts Awards for his acting in Equus; he reinterpreted the leading role Alan Strang as an innocent person, though he is largely depicted as a cruel and rebellious character.

In 2009, Cho revisited Equus by directing the play and playing the other lead character Martin Dysart. This was part of the highly successful Yeongeuk Yeoljeon ("A Series of the Best Plays"), of which Cho was the programmer in 2008–2009. Cho was praised for reinvigorating the faltering local theater scene in Daehangno by coming up with the series and its star-studded casting, promotion and marketing.

In 2018, Cho starred as a doctor and head of an organ transplant centre in the medical TV series Cross opposite Ko Kyung-pyo. However, on February 24, 2018, while the TV series was still being shot and aired, he was removed from the cast list following his admission of committing sexual harassment.

== Other activities ==
Cho is also the chairman of the Gyeonggi Film Council since 2009, executive festival director of the DMZ International Documentary Film Festival (DMZ Docs) since 2009, chairman of the Gyeonggi Arts Center since 2010, an associate professor at Sungshin Women's University's College of Convergence Culture and Arts since 2012, and an associate professor at Kyungsung University's Department of Theater and Film since 2014.

== Personal life ==
When Cho Jae-hyun was 24 years old in 1989, he married his college sweetheart who was an anchor for the campus channel. His son Cho Soo-hoon is a short track speed skater who won a gold medal in the 500 meter competition for male university students at the 2008 Korean National Winter Sports Festival, while his daughter Cho Hye-jung, who attended the American Academy of Dramatic Arts in New York City, is also an actress.

=== Sexual assault ===
On February 23, 2018, Cho Jae-hyun was accused of sexual misconduct by actress Choi Yul, who claimed that Cho had sexually assaulted her in the past. On February 24, Cho acknowledged the allegations.

In July 2018, a woman only known as "miss A" filed a lawsuit against Cho for 300 million ₩ as damages from an alleged sexual assault. The Seoul Central District Court ruled against her in January 2021.

== Filmography ==
=== Film ===
==== As actor ====
Year	Title	Role
1988	I Love You (short film)	
1989	Prostitute 2	
1990	Man Market	
1991	Portrait of the Days of Youth	
1992	Sorrow Like a Withdrawn Dagger, Left My Heart	
1995	The Eternal Empire	
1996	Karuna	
1996	Crocodile	Crocodile
1997	Wind Echoing in My Being	Young man
1997	Wild Animals	Cheong-hae
1998	Girls' Night Out	Yong-jak
1998	Spring in My Hometown	
1999	The Face	Kim Jae-mok
2000	Interview	Byung-kwon
2000	The Isle	Mang-chi
2001	Prison World Cup	Question
2001	Address Unknown	Dog Eyes
2001	Bad Guy	Han-ki
2003	Sword in the Moon	Yoon Gyu-yup
2004	Mokpo the Harbor	Lee Su-cheol
2004	Father and Son: The Story of Mencius	Maeng Man-su
2004	Love, So Divine	Cathedral construction worker (cameo)
2006	The Romance	Hyeong-jun
2006	Hanbando	Choi Min-jae
2007	Puff the Rice (short film)	Jae-won
2007	Beyond the Years	Dong-ho
2009	Marine Boy	Kang
2009	The Executioner	Bae Jong-ho
2010	The Influence	King Gojong
2011	The Kick	Master Mun
2012	The Weight	Mr. Jung/Han Hae-woon
2013	El Condor Pasa	Father Park
2013	Moebius	Father
2014	The Fatal Encounter	Gwang-baek
2015	A Korean in Paris	Sang-ho
2016	Seondal: The Man Who Sells the River	Seong Dae-ryeon

==== As director ====
Year	Title	Notes
2006	"Standing in the Shade of a Tree-lined Road" by Yim Jae-beom	Music video
2013	5th DMZ International Documentary Film Festival	Film festival trailer
2013	His Special Day	Documentary short
2014	6th DMZ International Documentary Film Festival	Film festival trailer
2015	A Break Alone	Feature film; also credited as screenwriter

=== Television series ===
Year	Title	Role
1989	The Tree of Love	
1990	Love on a Jujube Tree	
1990	The Age of Ambition	
1993	Drifting Myth	
1993	Woman's Man	
1993	Joy Amidst Sadness	
1993	Love and Friendship	
1994	MBC Best Theater – "A Meeting with the Perfect Man"	
1994	The Way to You	
1994	MBC Best Theater – "Human Decency"	
1995	One Fence	
1995	You Said You Love Me	
1996	Thief	
1996	Glorious Dawn	
1997	The Mountain	
1997	Passionate Love	
1997	Railing on Fire	
1998	Legendary Ambition	Ma Dal-soo
1998	Like the Wind, Like the Waves	
1998	MBC Best Theater – "Jeondeungsa"	
1999	You're One-of-a-Kind	
1999	School 2	Cho Jae-hyun
1999	Happy Together	Jo Pil-doo
1999	Queen	Park Jang-soon
1999	Did We Really Love?	
2000	Juliet's Man	
2000	Rookie	Heo Jang-seok
2000	School 3	
2001	Piano	Han Eok-kwan
2003	Snowman	Han Pil-seung
2003	Damo	(cameo)
2005	Hong Kong Express	Kang Min-soo
2005	Smile of Spring Day	Im Dae-beom
2007	New Heart	Choi Kang-gook
2011	Gyebaek	King Uija
2012	Syndrome	Cha Tae-jin
2012	Sent from Heaven	Geum Bo-hwa's ex-boyfriend (cameo)
2013	The Scandal	Ha Myung-geun
2014	Jeong Do-jeon	Jeong Do-jeon
2014	Punch	Lee Tae-joon
2015	Take Care of My Dad	Himself
2015	Assembly	(cameo, episode 1)
2016	The Master of Revenge	Kim Gil-do
2016	Solomon's Perjury	Han Kyung-moon
2017	Whisper	Lee Tae-joon
2018	Cross	Go Jung-hoon

== Theater ==
Year	Title	Role
1991	Equus	Alan Strang
2004	Equus	Alan Strang
2007	Kyung-sook, Kyung-sook's Father	Jo Jae-soo
2008	Educating Rita	Frank
2008–2009	Dandelions in the Wind	Ahn Jung-ki
2009–2010	Equus	Martin Dysart
2011	Dandelions in the Wind	Ahn Jung-ki
2012	Thursday Romance	Jeong-min
2014–2015	Educating Rita	Frank
2016	Blackbird	Ray

== Awards and nominations ==
Year	Award	Category	Nominated work	Result
1991	Baeksang Arts Awards	Best New Actor (Theater)	Equus	Won
1992	Blue Dragon Film Awards	Best New Actor	Sorrow Like a Withdrawn Dagger, Left My Heart	Won
1993	Baeksang Arts Awards	Best New Actor	Sorrow Like a Withdrawn Dagger, Left My Heart	Won
1998	Blue Dragon Film Awards	Best Supporting Actor	Girls' Night Out	Nominated
1999	SBS Drama Awards	Best Supporting Actor	Happy Together	Won
1999	KBS Drama Awards	Best Supporting Actor		Won
2001	Busan Film Critics Awards	Best Supporting Actor	Address Unknown	Won
2001	SBS Drama Awards	Top Excellence Award, Actor	Piano	Won
2001	SBS Drama Awards	Top 10 Stars	Piano	Won
2002	Baeksang Arts Awards	Best Actor	Bad Guy	Won
2003	MBC Drama Awards	Special Acting Award	Snowman	Won
2008	Baeksang Arts Awards	Best Actor (TV)	New Heart	Nominated
2008	Korea Drama Awards	Top Excellence Award, Actor	New Heart	Nominated
2008	MBC Drama Awards	Top Excellence Award, Actor	New Heart	Won
2008	PCG Awards	Communicator of the Year	—N/a	Won
2011	A Series of the Best Plays 3 Awards	Award for Excellence	Equus (as director)	Won
2013	Fantasia International Film Festival	Best Actor	The Weight	Won
2013	Sydney Intercultural Film Festival	Best Actor	The Weight	Won
2013	Grimae Awards	Best Actor	The Scandal	Won
2013	MBC Drama Awards	Top Excellence Award, Actor in a Special Project Drama	The Scandal	Nominated
2013	MBC Drama Awards	Golden Acting Award, Actor	The Scandal	Won
2014	Baeksang Arts Awards	Best Actor (TV)	Jeong Do-jeon	Won
2014	Korea Drama Awards	Grand Prize (Daesang)	Jeong Do-jeon	Nominated
2014	APAN Star Awards	Top Excellence Award, Actor in a Serial Drama	Jeong Do-jeon	Won
2014	KBS Drama Awards	Top Excellence Award, Actor	Jeong Do-jeon	Won
2014	KBS Drama Awards	Excellence Award, Actor in a Serial Drama	Jeong Do-jeon	Nominated
2014	KBS Drama Awards	PD Award	Jeong Do-jeon	Won
2015	Baeksang Arts Awards	Best Actor (TV)	Punch	Nominated
2015	Gwangju International Film Festival	Grand Prize (Daesang)	Punch	Won
2015	SBS Drama Awards	Top Excellence Award, Actor in a Drama Special	Punch	Won
2015	SBS Drama Awards	Top 10 Stars	Punch	Won
2016	KBS Drama Awards	Excellence Award, Actor in a Mid-length Drama	The Master of Revenge	Nominated
