= Lee Myoungwoo =

South Korean television director

- 이명우
- Born: South Korea
- Occupation: television director
- Years active: 2010–present
- Spouse(s): married, undisclosed

Korean name
- Hangul: 이명우
- RR: I Myeongu
- MR: I Myŏngu

Lee Myoungwoo (Korean: 이명우) is a South Korean television director best known for his works on Seoul Broadcasting System (SBS) television series, Punch (2014–2015), The Fiery Priest (2019) and Backstreet Rookie (2020). In January 2021, he established the production company The Studio M.

== Filmography ==
- Doctor on the Edge (Genie TV, 2026) - Director
- Boyhood (Coupang Play, 2023) - Showrunner
- One Ordinary Day (Coupang Play, 2021) - Director
- Backstreet Rookie (SBS, 2020) - Director
- The Fiery Priest (SBS, 2019) - Director
- Whisper (SBS, 2017) - Director
- Punch (SBS, 2014–2015) - Director
- You're All Surrounded (SBS, 2014) - Director
- Two Women's Room (SBS, 2013–2014) - Director
- Fashion King (SBS, 2012) - Director
- Warrior Baek Dong-soo (SBS, 2011)
- Ja Myung Go (SBS, 2009)
- Bad Couple (SBS, 2007)

== Awards ==
- 2024 ContentAsia Awards: Silver award - Best Director of a Scripted TV Programme (Boyhood)
- 2022 Asian Television Awards: Best Direction(One Ordinary Day)
- 2019 International Drama Festival in Tokyo: Special Award for Foreign Drama (The Fiery Priest)
- 2019 46th Korea Broadcasting Prizes: Best Mid-Length TV Drama (The Fiery Priest)
- 2019 14th Seoul International Drama Awards: Hallyu Drama Top Excellence Award (The Fiery Priest)
- 2015 Korean Broadcasting Critic's Association Critic's Circle Awards: Best TV Drama (Punch)
- 2015 Yoido Club Broadcaster of the Year: PD Award (Punch)
- 2015 42nd Korea Broadcasting Prizes: Best Mid-Length TV Drama (Punch)
