= Punch (TV series) =

- Genre: Political; Thriller; Drama
- Written by: Park Kyung-soo
- Directed by: Myoungwoo Lee
- Starring: Kim Rae-won; Kim Ah-joong; Cho Jae-hyun; Seo Ji-hye; On Joo-wan
- Music by: Gaemi
- Country of origin: South Korea
- Original language: Korean
- No. of episodes: 19

Production
- Executive producers: Han Jung-hwan; Moon Bo-mi
- Producer: Kim Dong-ho
- Production location: Korea
- Running time: 70 minutes Mondays and Tuesdays at 21:55 (KST)
- Production company: HB Entertainment

Original release
- Network: SBS TV
- Release: 15 December 2014 – 17 February 2015

Punch (Korean: 펀치) is a 2014–2015 South Korean television series starring Kim Rae-won, Kim Ah-joong, Cho Jae-hyun, Seo Ji-hye, and On Joo-wan. It aired on SBS from 15 December 2014 to 17 February 2015 on Mondays and Tuesdays at 21:55 for 19 episodes.

== Plot ==
Punch covers a record of the last six months of Park Jung-hwan's life. As the chief of the anti-corruption investigation team for the Supreme Prosecutors' Office, Jung-hwan previously compromised his integrity to advance his own career. However after being diagnosed with a malignant brain tumor and given only six months to live, he re-evaluates his life and dedicates his remaining life to pursuing justice. His primary objective becomes exposing the corruption of his superior, Prosecutor General Lee Tae-joon, whose friendly public face masks his unscrupulous morals and rampant corruption.

Helping Jung-hwan in his quest is his ex-wife, Shin Ha-kyung. Ha-kyung is an idealistic prosecutor for the Seoul District, and chose her profession over having a lucrative law career. She divorced Jung-hwan because he was obsessed with ambition and never had time for her and their young daughter, Ye-rin. But that doesn't mean she doesn't still care for him, though her concern is mixed with resentment.

== Cast ==
=== Main cast ===
- Kim Rae-won as Park Jung-hwan
- Kim Ah-joong as Shin Ha-kyung
- Cho Jae-hyun as Lee Tae-joon, Prosecutor General
- Seo Ji-hye as Choi Yeon-jin
- Choi Myung-gil as Yoon Ji-sook, Minister of Justice

=== Supporting cast ===
- On Joo-wan as Lee Ho-sung
- Kim Eung-soo as Jung Gook-hyun
- Lee Han-wi as Oh Dong-choon, detective
- Park Hyuk-kwon as Cho Kang-jae, prosecutor
- Song Ok-sook as Jung-hwan's mother
- Kim Ji-young as Park Ye-rin
- Lee Young-eun as Park Hyun-sun
- Lee Ki-young as Lee Tae-sub
- Jang Hyun-sung as Jang Min-seok
- Kim Hye-yoon as Cho Kang-jae's daughter
- Ryu Seung-soo (cameo)
- Kang Ha-neul (cameo)

== Ratings ==
In the tables below, the blue numbers represent the lowest ratings and the red numbers represent the highest ratings.

Episode #	Original broadcast date	Average audience share			
Episode #	Original broadcast date	TNmS Ratings		AGB Nielsen	
Episode #	Original broadcast date	Nationwide	Seoul National Capital Area	Nationwide	Seoul National Capital Area
1	15 December 2014	6.7% (NR)	8.6% (19th)	6.3% (NR)	8.6% (19th)
2	16 December 2014	6.6% (NR)	7.4% (NR)	6.8% (NR)	7.4% (NR)
3	22 December 2014	6.7% (NR)	7.4% (NR)	6.6% (NR)	7.6% (NR)
4	23 December 2014	7.7% (18th)	9.2% (17th)	7.7% (NR)	8.5% (17th)
5	29 December 2014	7.7% (NR)	9.2% (14th)	8.7% (18th)	9.3% (14th)
6	5 January 2015	9.3% (18th)	11.6% (11th)	9.6% (16th)	10.1% (13th)
7	6 January 2015	9.8% (15th)	12.7% (7th)	10.1% (15th)	10.7% (12th)
8	12 January 2015	9.8% (15th)	11.3% (10th)	9.1% (17th)	9.6% (15th)
9	13 January 2015	10.0% (14th)	12.3% (8th)	9.6% (16th)	9.6% (17th)
10	19 January 2015	10.8% (13th)	12.7% (8th)	10.4% (11th)	10.8% (9th)
11	20 January 2015	11.5% (9th)	14.4% (5th)	12.3% (8th)	13.3% (5th)
12	26 January 2015	11.1% (11th)	13.7% (8th)	11.4% (8th)	12.2% (7th)
13	27 January 2015	11.9% (10th)	15.3% (4th)	12.2% (8th)	13.5% (6th)
14	2 February 2015	11.2% (13th)	13.5% (6th)	12.5% (8th)	13.8% (6th)
15	3 February 2015	12.4% (10th)	15.2% (6th)	12.8% (6th)	14.0% (5th)
16	9 February 2015	12.1% (12th)	14.4% (6th)	12.7% (6th)	14.2% (5th)
17	10 February 2015	11.9% (11th)	14.8% (6th)	11.9% (8th)	13.1% (5th)
18	16 February 2015	12.7% (8th)	15.1% (5th)	14.0% (5th)	14.7% (5th)
19	17 February 2015	14.8% (5th)	17.2% (4th)	14.8% (4th)	14.9% (4th)
Average		10.2%	12.3%	10.6%	11.3%

== Awards and nominations ==
Year	Award	Category	Recipient	Result
2015	51st Baeksang Arts Awards	Best Drama	Punch	Nominated
2015	51st Baeksang Arts Awards	Best Actor (TV)	Kim Rae-won	Nominated
2015	51st Baeksang Arts Awards	Best Actor (TV)	Cho Jae-hyun	Nominated
2015	51st Baeksang Arts Awards	Best Screenplay (TV)	Park Kyung-soo	Won
2015	15th Gwangju International Film Festival	Grand Prize (Daesang)	Cho Jae-hyun	Won
2015	15th Gwangju International Film Festival	Best TV Star	Seo Ji-hye	Won
2015	4th APAN Star Awards	Top Excellence Award, Actor in a Miniseries	Kim Rae-won	Nominated
2015	4th APAN Star Awards	Best Supporting Actor	Jang Hyun-sung	Nominated
2015	4th APAN Star Awards	Best Supporting Actor	Park Hyuk-kwon	Nominated
2015	4th APAN Star Awards	Best Writer	Park Kyung-soo	Won
2015	SBS Drama Awards	Best Actor (medium-length drama)	Cho Jae-Hyun	Won
2015	SBS Drama Awards	Best Actor (medium-length drama)	Kim Rae-won	Nominated
2015	SBS Drama Awards	Best Actress (medium-length drama)	Choi Myung-gil	Won
2015	SBS Drama Awards	Best Actress (medium-length drama)	Kim Ah-joong	Nominated
2015	SBS Drama Awards	Special Actor (medium-length drama)	Kim Eung-soo	Nominated
2015	SBS Drama Awards	Special Actor (medium-length drama)	On Joo-wan	Nominated
2015	SBS Drama Awards	Special Actress (medium-length drama)	Seo Ji-hye	Nominated
2015	SBS Drama Awards	PD Award (chosen by PDs from KBS, SBS & MBC)	Kim Rae-won	Won
2015	SBS Drama Awards	PD Award (chosen by PDs from KBS, SBS & MBC)	Cho Jae-Hyun	Nominated
2015	SBS Drama Awards	Top 10 Stars	Cho Jae-Hyun	Won
2015	SBS Drama Awards	Best Couple Award	Kim Rae-won and Kim Ah-joong	Nominated
2015	4th CARI K Drama Awards	Drama of The Year	Punch	Nominated
2015	4th CARI K Drama Awards	PD Award for The Best Ensemble Casts	Punch	Won
2015	4th CARI K Drama Awards	Best Director	Lee Myung-Woo	Nominated
2015	4th CARI K Drama Awards	Best Screenplay	Park Kyung-soo	Won
2015	4th CARI K Drama Awards	Best Actor	Kim Rae-won	Nominated
2015	4th CARI K Drama Awards	Best Supporting Actor	Cho Jae-hyun	Won
2015	4th CARI K Drama Awards	Best Supporting Actress	Choi Myung-gil	Nominated

== International broadcast ==
It aired on ONE TV ASIA in Malaysia, Singapore and Indonesia premiering on 12 January 2015.
