= The Devil Judge =

2021 South Korean television series

- Promotional poster
- Hangul: 악마판사
- Hanja: 惡魔判事
- RR: Angmapansa
- MR: Angmap'ansa
- Genre: Mystery; Legal drama
- Created by: Kim Je-hyeon (tvN)
- Developed by: Studio Dragon
- Written by: Moon Yoo-seok
- Directed by: Choi Jung-kyu
- Starring: Ji Sung; Kim Min-jung; Park Jin-young; Park Gyu-young
- Music by: Jung Se-rin (CP)
- Opening theme: "I Am the Abyss" (제가 심연입니다) by Gu Bon-chun
- Country of origin: South Korea
- Original language: Korean
- No. of episodes: 16

Production
- Executive producer: Jang Jeong-do
- Producers: Kim Woo-taek; Jang Kyung-ik; Kang Sang-hoon; Lee Ji-yoon; Shin Yun-ha; Jang Min-ae; Kim Hyun-kyung
- Running time: 70 minutes
- Production companies: Studio Dragon; Studio&NEW

Original release
- Network: tvN
- Release: July 3 – August 22, 2021

The Devil Judge (Korean: 악마판사) is a South Korean television series starring Ji Sung, Kim Min-jung, Park Jin-young and Park Gyu-young. It aired on tvN from July 3 to August 22, 2021, for 16 episodes. It was also available for streaming on Viu and iQIYI in selected territories, and on Netflix from December 24.

A 48-chapter webtoon adaptation was serialized on Comico from July 11 to August 18, 2021.

== Synopsis ==
The series is set in a dystopian version of South Korea, where people harbor hatred towards their leaders and live in chaos. Trials are held through a courtroom live show aired on television, where three judges come together to bring justice and peace.

== Cast ==
=== Main ===
- Ji Sung as Kang Yo-han, a chief judge who punishes the dishonest with no mercy, thus earning himself a reputation as a hero of the people. However, he maintains a mysterious background and conceals his true motivations and ambitions.
  - Moon Woo-jin as child Kang Yo-han
- Kim Min-jung as Jung Sun-ah, Yo-han's greatest rival. She was born in a low-income family and used to be a servant in Yo-han's mansion, but now works for the Social Responsibility Foundation (SRF) and holds enough power to influence the leaders of society.
  - Kim Ga-yoon as young Jung Sun-ah
- Park Jin-young as Kim Ga-on/Kang Isaac
  - Park Jin-woo as child Kim Ga-on
  - Seo Woo-jin as child Kang Isaac
  - Cha Yoo-jin as young Kang Isaac
1. Kim Ga-on: An associate judge on the Live Court Show, he believes in obtaining justice through constitutional means. His parents died when he was 16.
2. Kang Isaac: Yo-han's deceased older half-brother, who perished in a fire. He had a striking resemblance to Ga-on.
- Park Gyu-young as Yoon Soo-hyun, Ga-on's childhood friend, she is a lieutenant in the Regional Investigation Unit, who tries to expose Kang Yo-han's secrets. She is a brave lady who believes that justice should be obtained by constitutional means. She has a crush on Ga-on since childhood.
  - Yoon Byul-ha as child Yoon Soo-hyun

=== Supporting ===
- Jeon Chae-eun as Kang Elijah, Isaac's daughter, and Yo-han's niece. She always acts like a tough girl outside, but she has a fragile heart and trusts others very easily. She is the only survivor of her family from the church fire alongside her uncle Kang Yo-han.
  - Kim Su-ha as child Kang Elijah
- Jang Young-nam as Cha Kyung-hee, the Minister of Justice, an ambitious former elite prosecutor, whose goal is to become the President of South Korea.
- Kim Jae-kyung as Oh Jin-joo, an associate judge on the Live Court Show, who idolizes Yo-han
- Ahn Nae-sang as Min Jeong-ho, an associate justice and Ga-on's former professor
- Hong Seo-joon as Min Yong-sik, Chairman of Minbo Group and one of the country's leading billionaires
- Baek Hyun-jin as Heo Joong-se, a former actor and the current President of South Korea
- Lee Seo-hwan as Park Du-man, Chairman of Saram Media and owner of the TV channel which broadcasts the Live Court Show
- Jeong In-gyeom as Seo Jeong-hak, Chairman of the Social Responsibility Foundation
- Lee Ki-taek as K, Yo-han's middleman
- Lee So-young as Jae-hee, Sun-ah's assistant
- Joo In-young as Kim Sang-sook, Min Yong-sik's wife and one of the Directors of Minbo Group
- Jung Ae-youn as Do Yeon-jung, Heo Joong-se's wife and the First Lady of South Korea
- Yoon Da-gyeong as Pi Hyang-mi, Park Du-man's wife and the Financial Manager of Saram Media
- Park Hyung-soo as Ko In-guk, Ju Il-do's former attorney
- Kim Moo-chan as Jo Min-sung, Chief of the Regional Investigation Unit
- Hwang Hee-jung as Han So-yoon, an aspiring actress who works for Yo-han
- Yoon Ye-hee as Ji Young-ok, Yo-han's former nanny and his current housekeeper, who helps take care of Elijah
- Moon Dong-hyeok as Lee Young-min, Cha Kyung-hee's only son and the Vice President of Joongwon FNB
- Nam Sung-jin as Lee Jae-kyung, Cha Kyung-hee's husband and CEO of Joongwon FNB
- Seo Sang-won as Ji Yoon-sik, the Chief Justice
- Joo Suk-tae as Kang Ji-sang, Yo-han's father
- Lee Hwa-ryong as PD of the Live Court Show
- Kwon Hae-sung as prosecutor
- Lee Hae-woon as Jukchang/Kim Choong-sik, a YouTuber
- Kim Kyoung-il as Secretary Kim, Cha Kyung-hee's secretary
- Lee So-geum as police detective and Soo-hyun's partner
- Seong Seung-heon as Live Court Show's announcer

=== Others ===
- Jung Jae-sung as Ju Il-do, Chairman of JU Chemicals (ep. 1–2)
- Lee Yang-hee as Doctor Yu Jong-baek (ep. 1–2)
- Cha Gun-woo as Jang Ki-young, also known as Dr. Safety, an employee at one of JU Chemicals factories (ep. 1–2, 6)
- Hong Jung-min as Sae-in, Yo-han's childhood classmate (ep. 2, 16)
- Kim Song-il as priest (ep. 2, 11)
- Lim Yong-soon as Director Yoon (ep. 2, 4)
- Myung Suk-geun as Jung In-seok, a temporary judge on the Live Court Show (ep. 3–4)
- Shin Kang-kyun as elderly scavenger (ep. 3–4, 13)
- Yook Jin-soo as Kim Man-ho, a furniture maker (ep. 3)
- Bae Eun-woo as Lee Young-min's girlfriend (ep. 3)
- Joo Boo-jin as restaurant owner (ep. 3)
- Shin Hee-gook as Lee Ji-hoon, restaurant employee and one of Lee Young-min's assault victims (ep. 3–4)
- Jang Ho-jin as Kim Sung-hoon, restaurant chef (ep. 3–4)
- Jung A-yeon as part-time waitress (ep. 3–4)
- Yoo Yong as Lee Young-min's attorney (ep. 3)
- Jung Chung-goo as former firefighter (ep. 3–4)
- Kim Kwang-sik as Detective Park (ep. 4–5)
- Kang Seo-joon as Nam Seok-hoon, a top actor (ep. 5)
- Yoon Jong-goo as child abuse defendant (ep. 5)
- Ki Hwan as prosecutor (ep. 5)
- Myung Jae-hwan as Nam Seok-hoon's attorney (ep. 5)
- Jung Min-gyul as actress (ep. 5)
- Bret Allan Lindquist as Texas official (ep. 5)
- Yeo Woo-rin as nurse (ep. 6–7)
- Park Jin-soo as foundation girl (ep. 7, 16)
- Jung Eun-pyo as Doh Young-choon, a con artist (ep. 7, 9 & 11)
- Kim Jung-moon as fake Doh Young-choon (ep. 7–8)
- Jung In-tae as prosecutor, Kim Ga-on's university friend (ep. 8)
- Jung Young-keum as Lee Myung-ja, Kim Choong-sik's grandmother (ep. 10)
- Choi Hwa-young as Park Doo-sik (ep. 10)
- Kang Suk-won as KU Security's employee (ep. 10)
- Suk Yoon-ho as barber (ep. 11)
- Hwang Joo-ho as Nam Si-woo, a prison warden (ep. 11, 16)
- Seo Dong-hwa as police officer (ep. 13)
- Cha Jae-hyeon as Jung Joseph (ep. 13, 15)
- Yoo Young-bok as Yoon Soo-hyun's father (ep. 14)
- Kim Joo-ah as Yoon Soo-hyun's mother (ep. 14)
- Min Dae-sik as Dr. Yoon Myung-jin (ep. 14)
- Min Ku-kyung as Yoon Chan-il, Kim Choong-sik's attorney (ep. 14)
- Park Soo-jin as app voting participant (ep. 14)
- Min Jung-sup as detective (ep. 16)
- Kim Jong-soo as Lee Jung-seok (ep. 16)
- Seo Myung-chan as committee member (ep. 16)
- Seo Young-sam as committee member (ep. 16)

== Production ==
=== Development ===
The drama, which was originally planned to run for 20 episodes instead of 16, is written by former judge Moon Yoo-seok. In June 2018, during the airing of the second half of his first drama, Ms. Hammurabi, Moon began to think about what it would be like to write about a judge with completely opposite tones and ways. He then talked about his idea with actor Ji Sung, imagining a judge who would join Batman and Joker together.

The setting of the series was inspired by the outbreak of the COVID-19 pandemic and by the "terrifying" changes that occurred in the world, defined by Moon as scarier than the virus itself: after seeing patients in hospices in Spain die because they were abandoned by nurses, the global economy collapsing in an instant, the world population struggling to make ends meet, the advent of fanatical groups attacking Congress, and the president of the United States of America treating doctors' advice as fake news, he decided to do a "thought experiment" similar to Black Mirror and V for Vendetta about what the world of the future would have been like if such a chaotic situation continued.

The characters of The Devil Judge moves in a hypothetical dystopian South Korea in which, two years after a mysterious epidemic, the deterioration of the economy, the rapid growth of unemployment and the feeling of not being safe have accelerated the polarization of the city and transformed the suburbs into slums destined for the collapsing poor class, while the center of the city is inhabited by the wealthiest social classes. Amplified by the media and political power, the anger of the population has led to a society dominated by violence, extremism and hatred towards its leaders, and it has become impossible to think of uniting in solidarity to find a solution; for this reason, the "devil" judge Kang Yo-han, who punishes evil without scruples, is designated by the population as the hero who will save them and through whom to vent discontent and anger.

The series has been defined by the writer as "chaotic and full of heterogenous elements", in which dystopian cartoon setting, classic tragedy narratives and theatrical dialogues are exasperated. Believing that "Dystopia is where authority becomes religion and religion becomes authority", Moon inserted religious overtones "to add a tragic feeling": the three judges who preside over the media tribunal, with their robes, resemble the Trinity, while the courtroom itself refers to an amphitheatre, and the name of the app used by the public to vote, Dike, to the homonymous deity of the Greek religion. References to Christianity are present in the crucifix worn on the wrist by Kang Yo-han, in the cross-shaped scar on his back, and in the names of the members of the Kang family, which recall those of the prophets of the Old Testament.

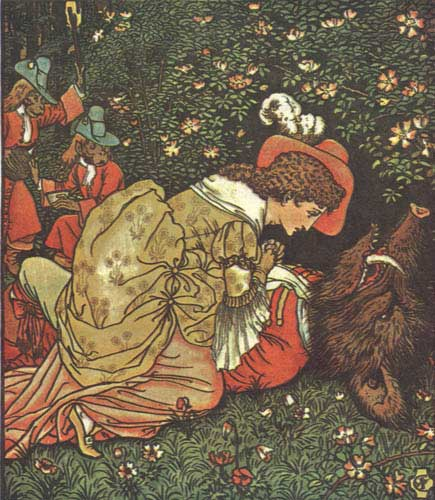
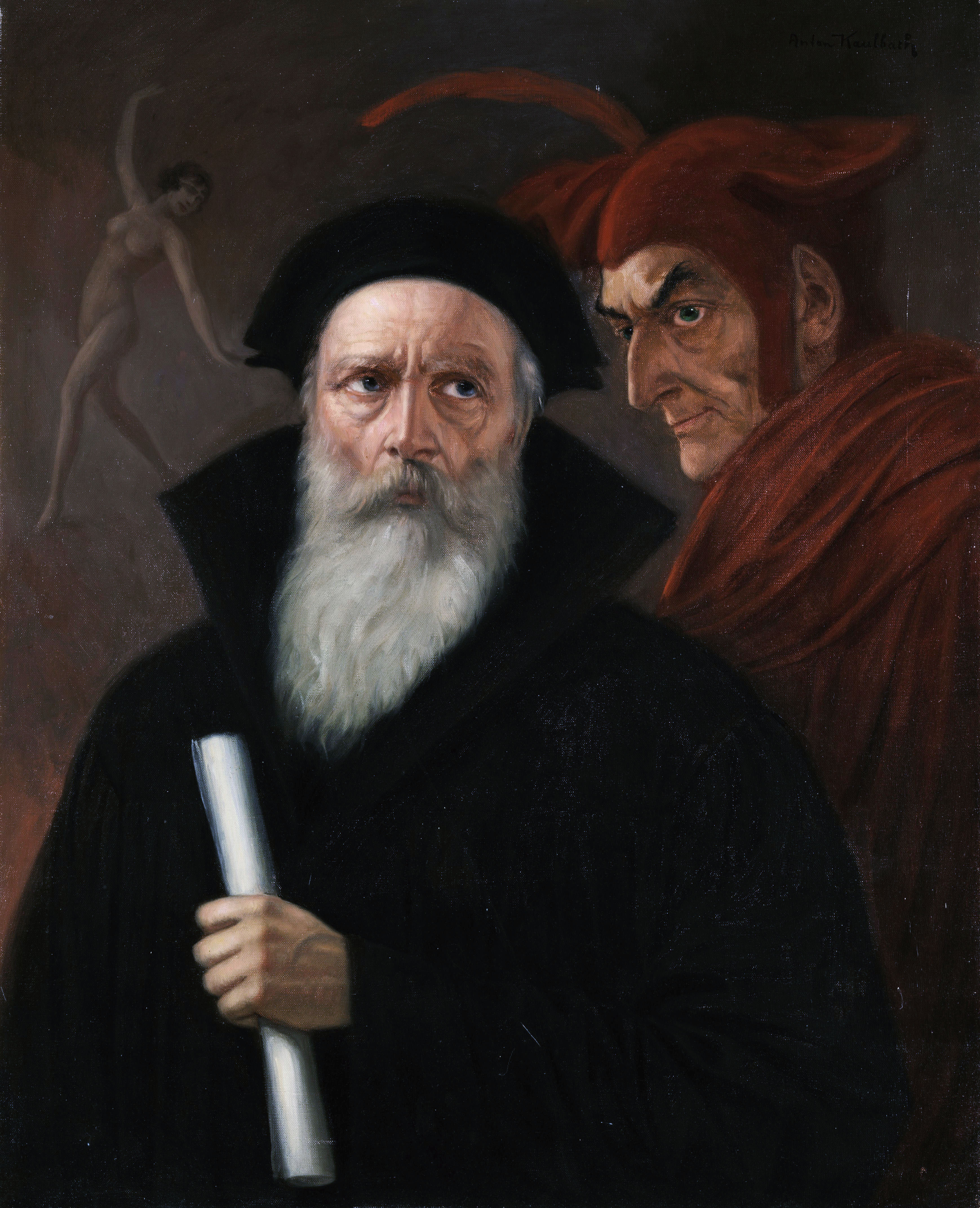
Beauty and the Beast and Faust were among the inspirational stories behind The Devil Judge; in particular, Kang Yo-han plays the role of Mephistopheles and Kim Ga-on that of Faust.

The script also merged some of the writer's favorite novels, such as Wuthering Heights, Jane Eyre, Rebecca, Beauty and the Beast and Faust, and a tribute to The Dark Knight Rises; the opening scene of episode 12, in which Yo-han's aide, K, tells Ga-on that he'll lose everything if he stays with Yo-han, was written while thinking of the movie Let Me In, and in particular to the characters of Håkan, a middle-aged man who dies miserably living next to the lonely vampire Eli, and of Oskar, a child who bears the same fate. Other occurrences in the series draw inspiration from real events, such as Donald Trump's presidency, Brexit, Duterte's regime in the Philippines, and the tweet published by terrorist Anders Breivik before carrying out the attacks of July 22, 2011, which is recalled in episode 10 in the first sentence of extremist Jukchang's manifesto, "One person who has faith is equal to the power of a million people who pursue only profit."

The Devil Judge addresses the growing popularity of series featuring dark heroes battling evil with evil, such as Vincenzo and Taxi Driver, and questions why they are so loved by the public. The final message, conveyed by Kim Ga-on who wonders what needs to be done to create a world that doesn't need Kang Yo-han, is that, through everyone's joint efforts to change the system, it's not too late to prevent the social and political situation told by the series from transforming in reality. Through the death of Yoon Soo-hyun, a character who represents the only person who has ever loved Kim Ga-on unconditionally, giving him the will to go on living, and who continues to worry about him despite being dying, the writer also wanted to highlight how love is the final form of redemption, and the belief that the world would be different if everyone had at least one person who truly loves them.

Moon, however, made it clear that, in writing the series, he focused more on the relationship between the characters rather than on conveying his own message, believing that, in telling their stories in certain situations and with certain narratives, the message would naturally arise as by-product. The relationships between the main characters are of three types: Kang Yo-han and Jung Sun-ah's relationship is expressed by the key phrase "I want to have you", Kang Yo-han and Kim Ga-on's by "I want to know you", and Kim Ga-on and childhood friend Yoon Soo-hyun's by "I want to protect you", although these three wishes are sometimes one-sided. The relationship between Yo-han and Ga-on has been described as a "bromance" in which the two characters attract each other like magnets due to their differences. Speaking of how he wrote the characters, Moon stated: "When I created the characters, I completely ignored the genders. [...] Cha Kyung-hee is simply a powerful and ambitious figure, and Yoon Soo-hyun is just a detective who wants to protect her first love. They are both familiar characters who often appear as men in Korean dramas. In contrast, the role of Kim Ga-on is often given to female characters. Characters trapped in conventional gender roles are obvious and monotonous, and I think the prejudice that all women must be autonomous and men can be flat is also artificial. Every human being is an individual."

=== Casting ===
On June 9, 2020, it was reported that Ji Sung had been offered the main role. Apart from his friendship with writer Moon Yoo-seok, Ji Sung decided to appear in the series to "look back at the idea of justice in the present age", to find and express a new side of himself, and because attracted by the unrealistic character of Kang Yo-han. Ji had difficulty understanding the role; as he found some similarities with Goethe's Faust, he shared that he initially played Kang Yo-han as a good character who draws his strength from evil, only to learn from the writer that he was, instead, Faust's seducer, Mephistopheles, and that he was "shocked" and "confused" by the revelation that Kang was completely evil. Kang's hairstyle, clothes and speech were instead agreed with the director.

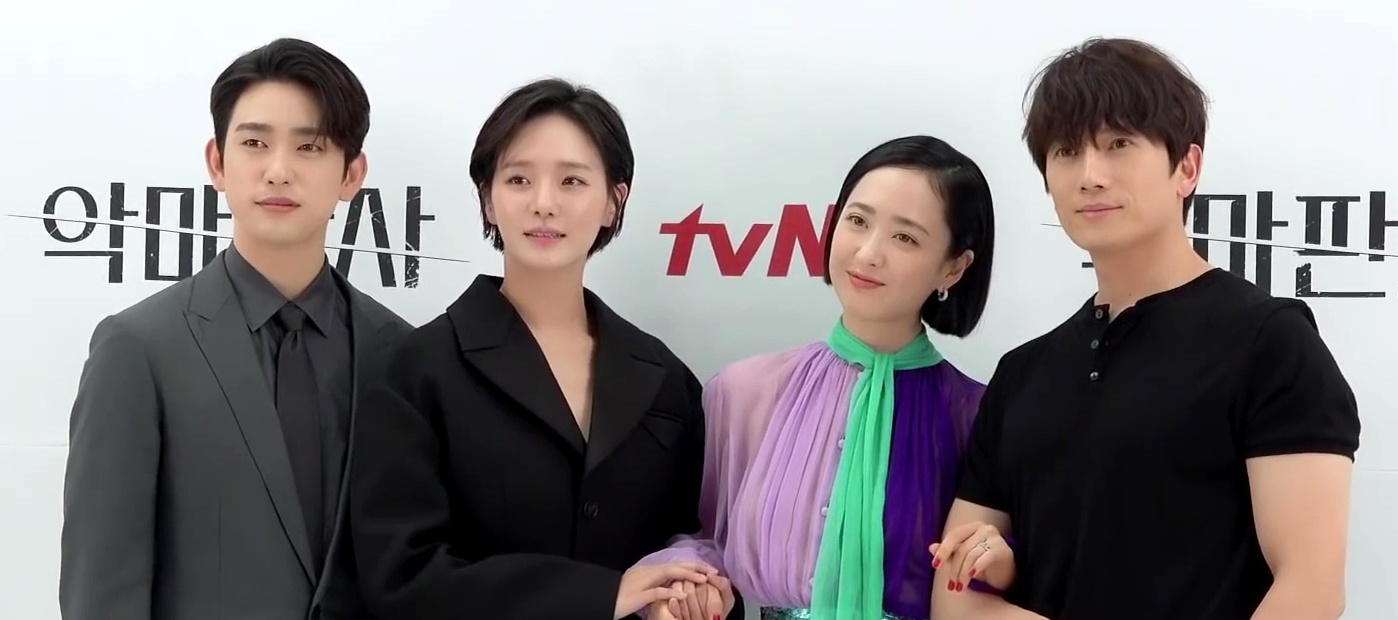
The cast of The Devil Judge at the press conference for the drama on July 1, 2021. From left to right: Park Jin-young, Park Gyu-young, Kim Min-jung and Ji Sung.

Park Jin-young and Park Gyu-young joined the possible line up in August, while Kim Min-jung's agency confirmed she was in talks to star in the drama on December 3. The four leads were confirmed on February 3, 2021, and Kim Jae-kyung also joined on May 12 in a recurring role. The Devil Judge is Ji Sung and Kim Min-jung's second collaboration after the medical drama New Heart (2007–08).

Park Jin-young wanted to act in The Devil Judge after being fascinated by Kim Ga-on's gradual change over the course of the series. At the audition, when Moon Yoo-seok asked him if, given the character's difficulty, he had read the script many times, Park answered no and that most likely they would cast someone more famous than him. The writer stated that he was struck by Park's defiant gaze and later discovered that he had actually read the synopsis and the script dozens of times, and that he even knew details unknown to him: this made him think he had found the perfect Ga-on, "sincere, competent and eager, but with an indistinct sense of resignation and anger." Later, Park commented that he sometimes felt embarrassed and regretful at his response because he probably gave the impression that he was spoiled.

Kim Min-jung was chosen at the director's suggestion, wanting an actress who could portray Jung Sun-ah as innocent and terrifying at the same time. Kim Jae-kyung received the script for The Devil Judge shortly after finishing Brave New World, the reading of which helped her understand the dystopian world. Impressed, in particular, by the idea of broadcasting the trials live throughout the nation, she met and interviewed a real judge to get a basic knowledge and understand how to play the role. She then auditioned wearing a Harry Potter cloak, having nothing more suitable, to immerse herself in the character of a judge.

=== Direction and set design ===
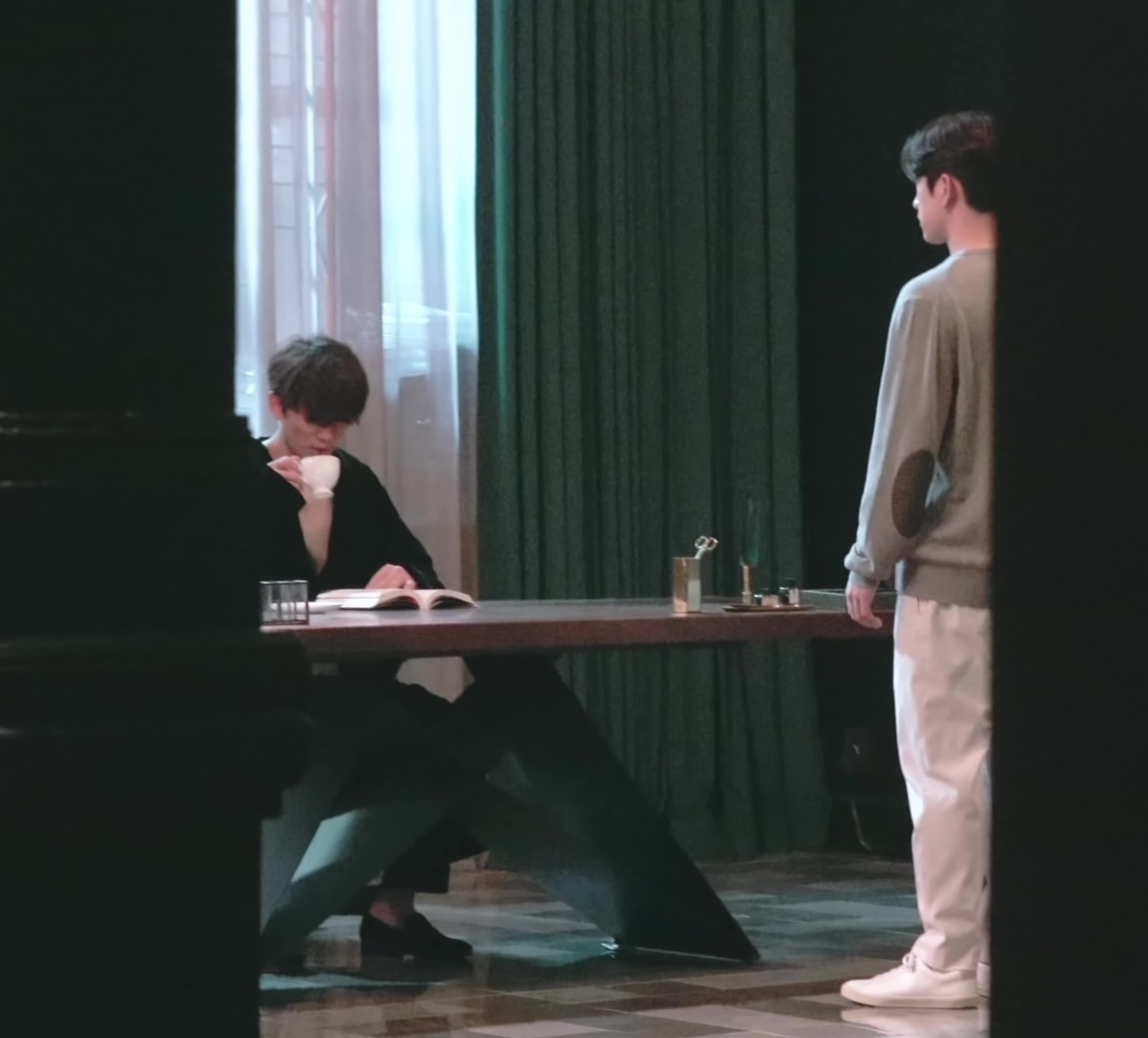
Ji Sung and Park Jin-young during the filming, in Kang Yo-han's studio at his mansion.

The Devil Judge is directed by Choi Jung-kyu, who, to create the dystopian atmosphere, has combined futuristic and virtual elements with classic elements of the genre; in the photography, on the other hand, darkness has been emphasized, preferring dark settings. Lee Yong-seop of Westworld took care of computer graphics, representing a "sophisticated but excessive, realistic but clumsy, possible but non-existent Seoul", placing buildings familiar to viewers in unknown places and assigning them to different uses. The color yellow, which in Christian religious art is associated with the robes of Judas Iscariot, was used for negative scenes and object; at the same time, the color, usually identified with light, is a reference to the character of Kim Ga-on, described in the synopsis as "The light of this world", and who is sent by his professor Min Jung-ho to spy on Kang Yo-han to steal his secrets and then betray him.

The sets were curated by artistic director Jo Hwa-seong. After highlighting the keywords "the poor gets poorer and the rich gets richer" (빈익빈부익부; 貧益貧富益富), "lawlessness" and "chaos" by reading the script, he chose to give the exteriors a "desperate", rough, dark and humble atmosphere in representation of the poor, and the interiors a feeling of order, flashiness and superfluous luxury, typical of the rich. Kang Yo-han's house is a classic dark mansion, similar to Batman's, to show his dark hero side; Kim Ga-on's rooftop room, decorated with plants that have been abandoned on the street, conveys hope and that happiness is not proportional to wealth, while the Foundation's offices are designed to show its inclinations for drama and exploitation of people's desires through almost shamanic rituals and devotions. The courtroom is purposely circular to refer to popular participation in the trials of ancient Greece.

=== Filming and promotion ===
Filming began in December 2020, after Ji Sung's return to South Korea from Hawaii and a two-week self-quarantine, and ended in early July 2021. Locations include Osstem's headquarters in Magok District, Seoul, for the exterior of Kang Yo-han's office, Balan Outlet in Hwaseong and Le Papillon Barber Shop in Gangnam, while, for the Blue House, the crew used the reconstruction at the Hapcheon theme park.

The first poster was released on May 20, 2021, followed on May 28 by a 15-second video teaser. The character posters were released on June 11, and the 15-second trailer for episode 1 was released on June 18. On June 28 and July 1, two videos of 90 and 190 seconds were released, the latter coinciding with the press conference, to introduce the setting of the first episodes.

== Original soundtrack ==
The music of the drama was composed by Jung Se-rin, who preferred the use of the electric guitar over the acoustic guitar. Kang Yo-han's and Kim Ga-on's suffering was expressed with instrumental strings solos, while for the moments in which Jung Sun-ah plots, the choice fell on the EDM genre; in addition to original pieces, the soundtrack makes use of Erik Satie's Gnossienne No. 1 and Rachmaninoff's Piano Sonata No. 2, rearranged to fit the mood of the scenes.

The soundtrack was released on CD on August 21, 2021, and contains 55 tracks.

=== Part 1 ===
Released on July 17, 2021
No.	Title	Lyrics	Music	Artist	Length
1.	"Tempest"	Lee Ki-yong	Lee Ki-yong	Huckleberry Finn	4:29
2.	"Tempest" (Inst.)		Lee Ki-yong		4:29
Total length:					8:59

=== Part 2 ===
Released on July 24, 2021
No.	Title	Lyrics	Music	Artist	Length
1.	"Nightmare" (악몽)	Song Yang-ha; Kim Jae-hyun; Lee Joo-ah	Song Yang-ha; Kim Jae-hyun; Lee Joo-ah; Yuk Ga-yeon	Sondia	3:10
2.	"Nightmare" (Inst.)		Song Yang-ha; Kim Jae-hyun; Lee Joo-ah; Yuk Ga-yeon		3:10
Total length:					6:21

=== Part 3 ===
Released on July 31, 2021
No.	Title	Lyrics	Music	Artist	Length
1.	"What You Gonna Do"	Zeenan; OneTop	Zeenan; OneTop	Zeenan	3:09
2.	"What You Gonna Do" (Inst.)		Zeenan; OneTop		3:09
Total length:					6:19

=== Part 4 ===
Released on August 7, 2021
No.	Title	Lyrics	Music	Artist	Length
1.	"The Nights" (너를 떠올린 건 항상 밤이었다)	Lee Ki-yong	Lee Ki-yong	Huckleberry Finn	3:44
2.	"The Nights" (Inst.)		Lee Ki-yong		3:44
Total length:					7:28

=== Full release ===
No.	Title	Lyrics	Music	Artist	Length
1.	"Tempest"	Lee Ki-yong	Lee Ki-yong	HuckleBerry Finn	4:29
2.	"Nightmare" (악몽)	Song Yang-ha; Kim Jae-hyun; Lee Joo-ah	Song Yang-ha; Kim Jae-hyun; Lee Joo-ah; Yook Ga-yeon	Sondia	3:10
3.	"What You Gonna Do"	Zeenan; OneTop	Zeenan; OneTop	Zeenan	3:09
4.	"The Nights" (너를 떠올린 건 항상 밤이었다)	Lee Ki-yong	Lee Ki-yong	HuckleBerry Finn	3:44
5.	"Tempest (Inst.)"		Lee Ki-yong		4:29
6.	"Nightmare (Inst.)" (악몽)		Song Yang-ha; Kim Jae-hyun; Lee Joo-ah; Yook Ga-yeon		3:10
7.	"What You Gonna Do (Inst.)"		Zeenan; OneTop		3:09
8.	"The Nights (Inst.)" (너를 떠올린 건 항상 밤이었다)		Lee Ki-yong		3:44
9.	"Enemy of Truth" (진실의 적)		Jung Se-rin		3:20
10.	"Irrationality" (부조리)		Jung Se-rin		3:33
11.	"I Am the Abyss" (제가 심연입니다)		Gu Bon-chun		3:56
12.	"Different From The Outside (feat. Denniyah)" (외면과 다른 내면)		Joo In-ro		3:00
13.	"Hope of Dystopia" (디스토피아의 빛)		Jung Se-rin		3:33
14.	"Mirror City" (뒤집힌 도시)		Kim Hyun-do		1:48
15.	"Hello, Master?" (안녕, 도련님?)		Hong Eun-ji		2:48
16.	"The True Nature of Devil" (악마의 실체)		Jung Hye-bin		2:38
17.	"Human's Cruel Selfishness" (인간의 잔혹한 이기심)		Jung Se-rin		2:47
18.	"If Only You.." (너희들만 있다면..)		Jung Se-rin		3:06
19.	"Trial Is A Game" (재판은 게임이야)		Son Seong-rak		2:44
20.	"A Crossroads of Choice" (선택의 기로)		Lee Yoon-ji		2:58
21.	"Painful Past" (고통스러운 과거)		Kang Mi-mi		2:16
22.	"Game and Hunter" (사냥감과 사냥꾼)		No Yoo-rim		3:00
23.	"An Unyielding Power Struggle" (양보 없는 기싸움)		Jung Se-rin		2:31
24.	"Disillusionment With Humans" (인간에 대한 환멸)		Shim Hee-jin		3:10
25.	"Mirror Of The Past (Rachmaninoff Piano Concerto No.2 1st mov.)" (과거의 거울 (Rachmaninoff Piano Concerto No.2 1st mov.))		Sergei Rachmaninoff; Joo In-ro		2:47
26.	"Darkness Longing For Light" (빛을 동경하는 어두움)		Jung Se-rin		2:47
27.	"Blooming Truth" (피어나는 진실)		Byun Sang-hoo		3:45
28.	"Fact Check" (팩트 체크)		Kang Mi-mi		2:30
29.	"Citizen Participation in Criminal Trials" (국민참여재판)		Kim Hyun-do		2:34
30.	"Finding a Piece of Goodwill" (한 조각 선의를 찾아서)		Jung Se-rin		2:07
31.	"Something Stronger"		Joo In-ro		2:46
32.	"The Defition You Want" (당신이 원하는 정의)		Kang Mi-mi		2:57
33.	"Fairness And Justice" (공정과 정의)		Byun Sang-hoo		2:50
34.	"Ambition And Power" (야심과 권력)		No Yoo-rim		2:36
35.	"Swamp of Doom" (파멸의 늪)		Hong Eun-ji		4:01
36.	"A Cold-Blooded Monster" (냉혹한 괴물)		Son Seong-rak		2:30
37.	"Angel or Devil" (천사 혹은 악마)		Kang Mi-mi		2:30
38.	"A Power Trap" (권력의 덫)		Lee Yoon-ji		2:52
39.	"Warmth That Melts Loneliness" (외로움을 녹이는 온기)		Jung Se-rin		2:52
40.	"Blind Spot"		Kang Mi-mi		2:11
41.	"Tracking" (추적)		No Yoo-rim		2:42
42.	"Hypocrisy And Wickedness" (위선과 사악함)		Son Seong-rak		2:43
43.	"Ominous Aura" (불길한 기운)		Shim Hee-jin		2:49
44.	"Schooled" (참교육)		Kim Hyun-do		2:38
45.	"My Whole Side" (온전한 내편)		Jung Se-rin		2:36
46.	"Because I Have You" (나한테 네가 있잖아)		Lee Yoon-ji		2:39
47.	"Ruthless"		Shin Yoo-jin		3:26
48.	"Broken World" (무너진 세상)		Jung Se-rin		3:48
49.	"Hypocrites" (위선자들)		Hong Eun-ji		2:16
50.	"Runaway Justice" (폭주하는 정의)		Joo In-ro		2:36
51.	"Paradox"		Shin Yoo-jin		1:49
52.	"The Evils of Society" (사회의 악)		Jung Hye-bin		2:45
53.	"Devastating Revenge" (슬픈 복수)		Jung Se-rin		2:43
54.	"A Strong Ruling" (강력한 판결)		Jung Se-rin		2:37
55.	"Gnossienne No. 1"		Erik Satie		3:06
Total length:					2:42:00

== Reception ==
=== Critical reception ===
After the first episode, it was observed that the unfamiliar dystopian background and virtual setting of the series were complicated to understand. Lee Jung-hyun of Yonhap News commented that it seemed to focus more on action and visuals, and that cohesion was missing, an opinion shared by pop culture critic Kim Seong-soo and Korean literature professor and drama critic Yoon Seok-jin of Chungnam National University, who found the directing excessive and that the message was not clearly revealed. Instead, Choi Sang-jin of Seoul Economic Daily felt that the first episode had struck a perfect balance by combining "exhilarating rapid development, sophisticated directing and excellent performances by the actors".

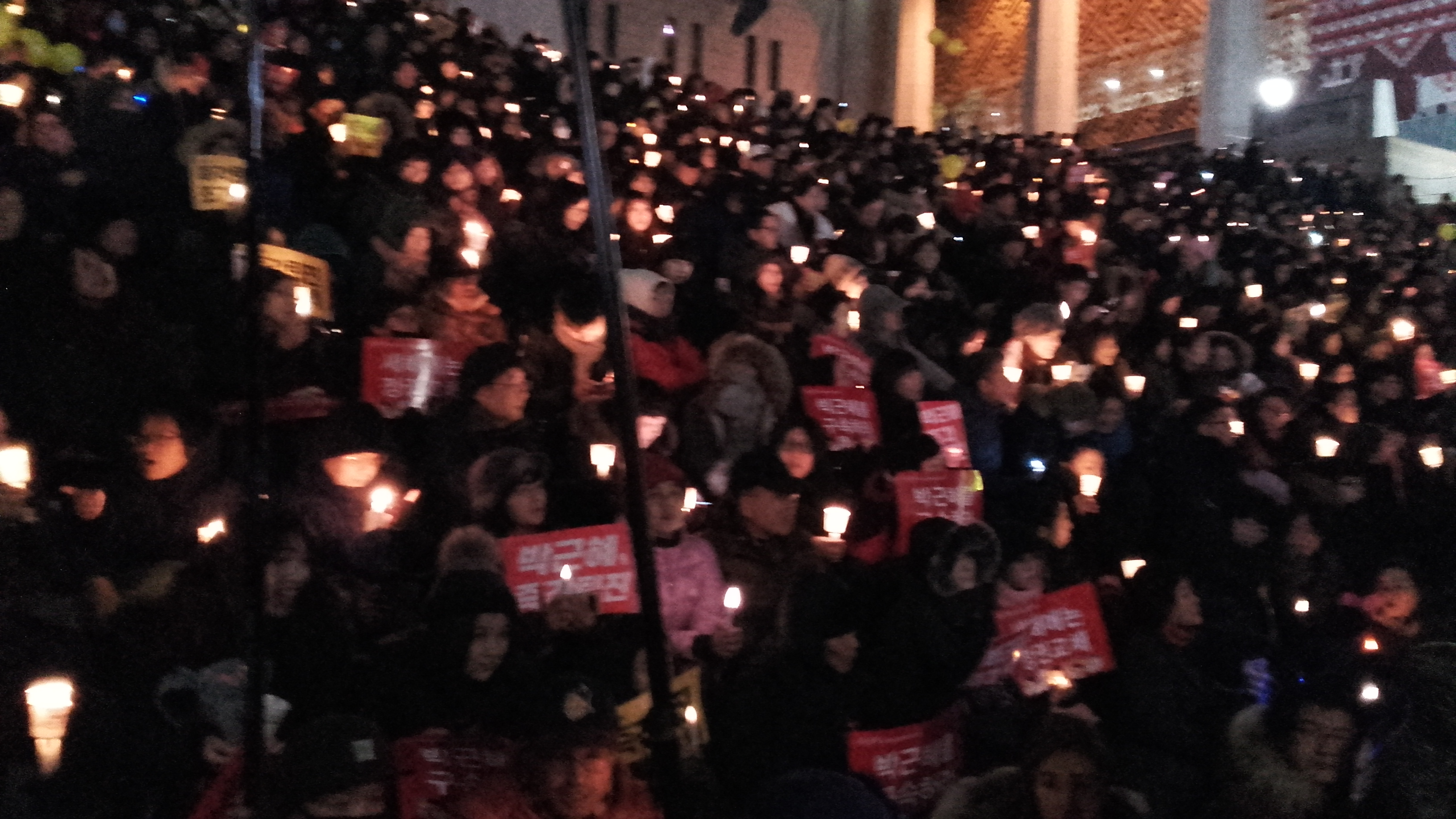
One of the candlelit protests against Park Geun-hye in 2016.

Pop culture critic Jung Deok-hyun pointed out that the fictional world represented by The Devil Judge showed the existence, in the real world, of "straw men" behind which the real forces in power are hidden, and that there was no fairness and justice, commenting: "The fictional dystopian Korea portrayed by The Devil Judge is drawn as if it were another parallel world in our reality. But, the more you insist it is virtual and just fiction, the more bitter it becomes. That's because the story [...] is getting more and more real as the story goes on. The more I say it's show and fiction, the more disgust arises from the discomfort I feel seeing an overlap, which should not happen, with reality". He attributed the diverse audience reactions to the series to its "terribly skeptical elitism", commenting that the way the population was swayed made sad and bitter even the reminiscence to the Gwangju massacre of May 18, 1980 and to the candlelit vigils calling for Park Geun-hye's resignation, which are recalled in the indiscriminate assaults suffered by the residents of Hyeongsan-dong in episode 13. Moreover, seeing secondary characters' tendency to sacrifice themselves for no apparent reason, Jung felt that the same elitism was reflected in the way Moon had decided to write the characters, making it seem that they were created on purpose to disappear from the scene at the right moment and unleash the emotions of the protagonists. Speaking of Kang Yo-han, he stated: "He is represented as a dark hero who lives alone in a mansion, like Bruce Wayne in The Dark Knight Rises, but it's hard to see him trying to save people in need".

In reviewing the first ten episodes, Bryan Tan of Yahoo Lifestyle Singapore called the series "a chaotic dystopian circus of greed and corruption," whose hallmarks are theatrics, drama and pageantry, deeming it "explosively dramatic" and continually improving. He praised Park Jin-young, writing, "[he] has been spectacularly pleasurable to watch. The young actor is extremely authentic in his portrayal of the tortured and righteous associate judge Kim Ga-on, and his ambiguous romantic feelings towards his friend Yoon Soo-hyun adds flavour to the side plot, and his presence adds a lighter and youthful dimension in contrast to Kang Yo-han's direct and merciless methods."

At the end of the broadcast, Kim Hyun-rok of SpoTV News complimented the acting and chemistry of the actors, believing they harmonized with "detailed narrative development that caught us off guard and sophisticated direction that vividly displayed a virtual dystopian Korea." Kim Hee-kyung and Kim Hye-rang of Hankyung praised the refreshing and unconventional development, the contrasts between rich and poor, and appreciated that it opened a debate on the correctness of Kang Yo-han's methods and what true justice was. Choi Hee-jae of XsportsNews complimented the bromance between Ji and Park, and the characters in general for showing their presence and leading a solid story, "a 'virtual dystopia' not far from the past and the present," adding: "Moving back and forth between reality, The Devil Judge made me think about what justice was and what is right" and concluding that "the ending crosses reality and fantasy, exhilaration and displeasure, and sin and atonement."

On the contrary, Lee Jung-hyun of Yonhap News argued that The Devil Judge had shown "no attraction beyond spectacle and vicarious satisfaction" and that, despite the broadcaster's emphasis on promoting social justice, ordinary people were relegated to "bridesmaids" while the protagonists faced the government that had hidden the truth. The same comparison was used by critic Jung Deok-hyun, who said: "Taking away the provocative verdicts and glamorous images, The Devil Judge is a more bare-bones work than you think. Like The Dark Knight Rises, which treated the dilemma of justice seriously, this drama often shows a dilemma, but what it reveals is the weakness of a human being swayed by lust. I don't think it's coherent to put social justice as a message and not let ordinary people be seen." Park Chang-gi of TenAsia criticized the unconvincing and hardly credible development of the story, decreed that the conclusion drawn by The Devil Judge was that killing for personal revenge was justified, and deemed that the ending was empty and left only a sense of disappointment.

Pierce Conran of the South China Morning Post found the start of the series strong and promising, then he commented that it veered towards a middle stretch "full of ups and downs as the story meanders between fun moments and finger-twiddling lulls." Evaluating it with 3 out of 5 stars, he concluded that it was "devilishly entertaining and derived thrilling catharsis from its live courtroom scenes", but that it showed an "almost pathological disregard for women", given that, out of five female characters, four were disabled or ended up losing their lives.

The Devil Judge figured in tenth place on Forbes' list of the best Korean dramas of 2021 for "strong performances and the parody of some too-close-for-comfort political realities".

=== Viewership ===
The Devil Judge was among the five most anticipated Korean dramas of 2021. According to Nielsen Korea, the first episode recorded an average share of 6% in the Seoul metropolitan area and 5.6% nationwide, with a real-time peak of 6.9% and 6.6% respectively. The last episode marked the highest ratings, with an average national share of 8% and a real-time peak of 10.1%, occupying the first place among the programs of the same time slot. The series was the most watched program in its time slot for the entire broadcast period.

The Devil Judge : South Korea viewers per episode (millions)

Season	Episode number																Average
Season	1	2	3	4	5	6	7	8	9	10	11	12	13	14	15	16	Average
1	1.382	1.232	1.300	1.519	1.481	1.452	1.325	1.224	1.108	1.300	1.600	1.508	1.540	1.547	1.812	1.994	1.458

Source: Audience measurement performed nationwide by Nielsen Korea

Average TV viewership ratings
Ep.	Original broadcast date	Title	Average audience share (Nielsen Korea)	
Ep.	Original broadcast date	Title	Nationwide	Seoul
1	July 3, 2021	Star Judge (스타판사)	5.552% (1st)	5.986% (1st)
2	July 4, 2021	Prey and Hunter (사냥감과 사냥꾼)	5.095% (1st)	5.658% (1st)
3	July 10, 2021	The Secret Room (비밀의 방)	5.534% (1st)	5.797% (1st)
4	July 11, 2021	Yo-han's Cross (요한의 십자가)	6.287% (1st)	6.550% (1st)
5	July 17, 2021	Scissor Hands (가위손)	5.982% (1st)	6.512% (1st)
6	July 18, 2021	Achille's Heel (아킬레스건)	6.015% (1st)	6.148% (1st)
7	July 24, 2021	Dreams Shall Come True (꿈은 이루어진다)	5.600% (1st)	5.622% (1st)
8	July 25, 2021	Resistance (레지스탕스)	5.468% (1st)	5.450% (1st)
9	July 31, 2021	Batman and Robin (배트맨과 로빈)	4.739% (1st)	5.072% (1st)
10	August 1, 2021	Frankenstein (프랑켄슈타인)	5.623% (1st)	5.737% (1st)
11	August 7, 2021	Macbeth (맥베스)	6.321% (1st)	6.164% (1st)
12	August 8, 2021	I Hope You Are Lonely (네가 외로웠으면 좋겠어)	6.431% (1st)	6.770% (1st)
13	August 14, 2021	The Hunger Games (헝거게임)	6.910% (1st)	6.786% (1st)
14	August 15, 2021	King of the Frogs (개구리들의 왕)	6.944% (1st)	6.564% (1st)
15	August 21, 2021	Medea (메데이아)	7.492% (1st)	7.367% (1st)
16	August 22, 2021	The Devil Judge? (악마판사?)	7.960% (1st)	7.694% (1st)
Average			6.122%	6.242%
In the table above, the blue numbers represent the lowest ratings and the red numbers represent the highest ratings.; This drama airs on a cable channel/pay TV which normally has a relatively smaller audience compared to free-to-air TV/public broadcasters (KBS, SBS, MBC and EBS).

== Sequel ==
Interviewed about a possible second season at the end of the airing, writer Moon Yoo-seok declared his willingness to write it and that he wanted to try a more light-hearted action series, like Sherlock and Lupin.
