= Ji Sung =

South Korean actor (born 1977)

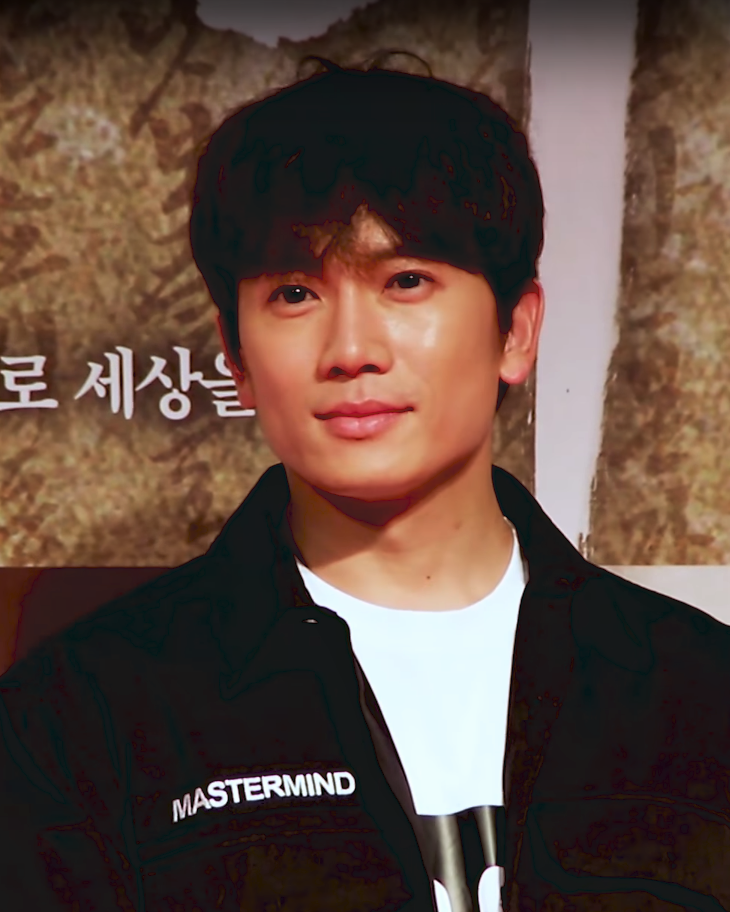
- Ji in 2018
- Born: Kwak Tae-geun; 27 February 1977 (age 49); Yeongdeungpo District, Seoul, South Korea
- Education: Hanyang University - Theater and Film
- Years active: 1999–present
- Agent: Surpass Entertainment
- Spouse: Lee Bo-young (m. 2013)
- Children: 2

Korean name
- Hangul: 곽태근
- Hanja: 郭太根
- RR: Gwak Taegeun
- MR: Kwak T'aegŭn

Stage name
- Hangul: 지성
- RR: Ji Seong
- MR: Chi Sŏng

Kwak Tae-geun (Korean: 곽태근, born 27 February 1977), known professionally as Ji Sung (Korean: 지성), is a South Korean actor. He is best known for his roles in the television dramas All In (2003), Save the Last Dance for Me (2004), New Heart (2007), Protect the Boss (2011), Secret Love (2013), Kill Me, Heal Me (2015), Innocent Defendant (2017), Familiar Wife (2018), Doctor John (2019), The Devil Judge (2021), Connection (2024), The Judge Returns (2026) and the film My PS Partner (2012).

== Early life ==
Kwak Tae-geun's parents were both educators, and they expected him to also enter the teaching profession. But in his sophomore year in high school, his father bought him a VCR and the first movie he rented was Rain Man. Dustin Hoffman's acting left such an impression on him that he decided to become an actor, despite his father's objections. He later studied Theater and Film at Hanyang University.

== Career ==
=== 1999–2002: Beginnings ===
Ji Sung first auditioned for the 1999 campus drama KAIST, where he met screenwriter Song Ji-na. Song took an interest in the young upstart and wrote a new character for him, leading to his acting debut. Upon the suggestion of his then-manager, he began using the stage name Chae Ji-sung, then decided to drop the surname "Chae," and became known simply as "Ji Sung" After several minor roles, he began playing bigger parts, notably in the television dramas Wonderful Days (2001) and Sunshine Hunting 2002), as well as the North-South romantic comedy film Whistling Princess (2002).

=== 2003–2004: Breakthrough ===
Ji was then cast in the 2003 gambling drama All In. Producers were having difficulty casting the second male lead because most actors were afraid to be compared to lead actor Lee Byung-hun. Ji Sung approached director Yoo Chul-yong, saying he wanted the role. All In was a big hit, and Ji Sung's popularity rose and became known as a Hallyu star. Wanting to challenge himself, he next appeared in his first period drama The King's Woman, playing Gwanghaegun of Joseon.

In Save the Last Dance for Me (2004), he played a rich amnesiac businessman who falls in love with a girl running a bed and breakfast who nurses him back to health (played by Eugene). He then made a guest appearance playing Bae Jong-ok's college boyfriend in "Outing", a two-episode arc written by Lee Kyung-hee for the omnibus drama Beating Heart (2005), followed by a supporting role in Kim Dae-seung's period thriller Blood Rain (2005).

=== 2005–2007: Enlistment ===
Ji enlisted on 7 June 2005, for his mandatory military service. Though he initially enlisted as an ordinary soldier, the Military Manpower Administration transferred him to the military promotion ("entertainers") unit in February 2006, for which he served as "public ambassador of military affairs". He was discharged on 6 June 2007.

=== 2008–2014: Comeback and lead roles ===
He made his comeback in the medical drama New Heart (2007–08), playing a cardiothoracic surgery resident. During a scene where his character cries after failing to save the life of a former comfort woman, Ji said he thought of his maternal grandmother who'd recently died, remembering that she'd told him her only pleasure was watching him in reruns of All In. Contrary to his cheeky, playful character, Ji said that he's taciturn and shy in real life, but that the drama made him find a different side of himself.

He then made an extended cameo as the sophisticated right-hand man of the mob boss in action noir Fate (2008).

In 2009, Ji collaborated again with writer Choi Wan-kyu and director Yoo Chul-yong of All In in the revenge drama Swallow the Sun, adapted from the novel by Kang Chul-hwa, and shot on location in Jeju Island, Las Vegas and South Africa. Ji trained hard to play the tough, strong-willed protagonist who goes to prison for his boss and later becomes involved in the city development of Jeju.

In February 2010, he signed with a new management agency, Namoo Actors. Several months later, he played another historical character in Kim Su-ro, The Iron King, as the titular founder of Geumgwan Gaya.

In 2011, Ji starred alongside Yum Jung-ah in Royal Family, about the power plays within a chaebol family. Later that year, he was cast in the workplace romantic comedy Protect the Boss. In a departure from his usual serious roles, Ji Sung played a dorky man-child with a panic disorder, who matures and learns to run his father's business after meeting a feisty secretary (played by Choi Kang-hee).

From 2012 to 2013, Ji played a gifted seer/geomancer in The Great Seer. His fictional character becomes a "kingmaker" to Yi Seong-gye (played by Ji Jin-hee), the general who leads the overthrow of Goryeo and establishes the Joseon Dynasty, becoming its first king Taejo.

In late 2012, he starred in adult romantic comedy My PS Partner, playing an aspiring singer-songwriter trying to get over a breakup, who becomes the wrong recipient of a phone sex call from a woman (played by Kim Ah-joong) trying to seduce her boyfriend into proposing. Ji said he found the script intriguing, despite the discomfort of appearing in bed scenes. And after he saw Love & Other Drugs, he wanted to be in a movie that portrayed a romantic relationship in a realistic manner.

In 2013, Ji starred in melodrama Secret Love. He said he chose the drama because he found the script "fresh, honest, and sophisticated." He played a chaebol "bad boy" whose girlfriend is killed, then falls for the woman who went to prison for the crime. Ji next appeared in Confession, a 2014 neo-noir film that brutally explores the aftermath of three men's friendship after the death of one's mother.

=== 2015–present: Career resurgence ===
In 2015, he reunited with Secret Love co-star Hwang Jung-eum in Kill Me, Heal Me, in which he played a chaebol millionaire with dissociative identity disorder formerly known as Multiple Personality Disorder from DSMIV-TR who has seven different identities. The series was a hit and developed a cult following, winning Ji the "Daesang (Grand Prize)" at the MBC Drama Awards.

However, Ji's next work Entertainer, where he played a cunning and self-centered manager of an entertainment company, failed to be successful. Ji bounced back in 2017 with legal thriller Innocent Defendant, which was a hit and topped viewership ratings. Ji earned acclaim for playing the diverse emotions of the character, an amnesic prosecutor who finds himself on a death row. He received the Grand Prize award at the SBS Drama Awards.

In 2018, Ji starred in the fantasy romance comedy drama Familiar Wife. The same year he starred in the period comedy film Feng Shui.

In 2019, Ji starred television series Doctor John. It is his first medical drama in 11 years.

In 2020, Ji appeared in tvN's travel show RUN alongside Kang Ki-young, Lee Tae-sun and Hwang Hee.

In 2021, Ji starred in the mystery legal drama The Devil Judge with his previous co-star Kim Min-jung who he worked together 13 years ago in the drama New Heart. In August 2021, Namoo Actors' contract expired and Ji decided not to renew it.

In January 2022, Ji signed an exclusive contract with Surpass Entertainment. He starred in a mystery drama called Adamas, which aired from 27 July to 15 September 2022. Ji played the roles of the twin brothers who pair up to uncover the mystery of a murder that occurred 22 years ago.

== Personal life ==
=== Marriage and family ===
He met actress Lee Bo-young on the set of 2004 TV series Save Last Dance for Me, and they confirmed their relationship in 2007. On 2 August 2013, the couple announced their engagement by uploading handwritten letters on their respective official fan sites. They married at Aston House, W Seoul Walkerhill Hotel on 27 September 2013. Their first child, a daughter named Kwak Ji-yoo, was born on 13 June 2015. Their second child, a son named Kwak Woo-sung, was born on 5 February 2019.

== Filmography ==
=== Film ===
Year	Title	Role	Notes	Ref.
2002	Whistling Princess	Joon-ho		
2004	Phantom Master: Dark Hero from the Ruined Empire	Ending narration	Animated film	
2005	Blood Rain	Du-ho		
2008	Fate	Park Yeong-hwan		
2012	My PS Partner	Lee Hyun-seung		
2014	Confession	Im Hyun-tae		
2015	The Vampire Lives Next Door	Han Chang Ho	Short film	
2018	Feng Shui	Heungseon Daewongun		

=== Television series ===
Year	Title	Role	Notes	Ref.
1999	KAIST	Kang Dae-wook		
1999	March		Guest	
2000	Popcorn			
2000	I Want to Keep Seeing You	Lee Ji-soo		
2001	Delicious Proposal	Oh Joon-soo		
2001	Open Drama Man & Woman	Lee Soo-hyun	episode: "A Couple of Hours; Before Breaking Up with Her"	
2001	The Rules of Marriage	Hwang Won-soo		
2001	Wonderful Days	Jang Seok-jin		
2002	Let's Go		Guest, episode: "Monkey"	
2002	Sunshine Hunting	Lee Seung-joon		
2003	All In	Choi Jung-won		
2003	The King's Woman	Prince Gwanghae		
2004	Terms of Endearment	Noh Yoon-taek		
2004	Save the Last Dance for Me	Kang Hyun-woo		
2005	Beating Heart	Kim Woo-jin / Kim Seok-jin	Guest, episodes 9-10: "Outing"	
2007	New Heart	Lee Eun-sung		
2009	Swallow the Sun	Kim Jung-woo		
2010	Kim Su-ro, The Iron King	Kim Su-ro		
2011	Royal Family	Han Ji-hoon		
2011	Protect the Boss	Cha Ji-heon		
2012	The Great Seer	Mok Ji-sang		
2013	Secret Love	Jo Min-hyuk		
2015	Kill Me, Heal Me	Cha Do-hyun / Shin Se-gi / Perry Park / Ahn Yo-na / Ahn Yo-seob / Nana / Mr. X		
2016	Entertainer	Shin Suk-ho		
2017	Innocent Defendant	Park Jung-woo		
2018	Familiar Wife	Cha Joo-hyuk		
2019	Doctor John	Cha Yo-han / John Cha		
2021	The Devil Judge	Kang Yo-han		
2022	Adamas	Ha Woo-shin / Song Soo-hyun		
2024	Connection	Jang Jae-kyung		
2026	The Judge Returns	Lee Han-young		
2026	The Apartment Job	Park Hae-gang		

=== Television show ===
Year	Title	Role	Ref.
2020	Run	Regular member	

=== Hosting ===
Year	Title	Notes	Ref.
2002	Live Music Camp	Host	
2004	Music Bank	Host	
2008	STAR N the CITY: Ji Sung in Dubai	Host	

=== Music video appearances ===
Year	Song title	Artist	Ref.
2000	"Leave Me Alone"	Lee Kang-shin	
2002	"Cold"	Lee Ki-chan	
2004	"Black and White Photos"	KCM	
2008	"The Practical Usage of Sadness"	Kim Bum-soo	
2009	"Trickling"	Wheesung	
2019	"We"	Baek Ji-young	

== Discography ==
=== Soundtrack appearances ===
Title	Year	Album	Ref.
"Confession" (고백)	2004	Terms of Endearment OST	
"Sexy Jingle Bells" (섹시 징글벨)	2012	My PS Partner OST	
"Show Me Your Panty"	2012	My PS Partner OST	
"Wuthering Heights" (폭풍의 언덕)	2013	Secret Love OST	
"Violet" (제비꽃)	2015	Kill Me, Heal Me OST	

== Accolades ==
=== Awards and nominations ===
Name of the award ceremony, year presented, category, nominee of the award, and the result of the nomination
Award ceremony	Year	Category	Nominee / Work	Result	Ref.
APAN Star Awards	2014	Excellence Award, Actor in a Miniseries	Secret Love	Nominated	
APAN Star Awards	2015	Top Excellence Award, Actor in a Miniseries	Kill Me, Heal Me	Nominated	
APAN Star Awards	2024	Top Excellence Award, Actor in a Miniseries	Connection	Nominated	
Asia Model Awards	2010	BBF Popular Star Award	Ji Sung	Won	
Asian TV Drama Conference	2015	Special Award, Actor	Kill Me, Heal Me	Won	
Baeksang Arts Awards	2015	Best Actor – Television	Kill Me, Heal Me	Nominated	
Baeksang Arts Awards	2026	Best Actor – Television	The Judge Returns	Nominated	
DramaFever Awards	2016	Best Actor	Kill Me, Heal Me	Won	
Grimae Awards	2017	Best Actor	Innocent Defendant	Won	
Han Il Culture Awards	2008	민간외교부분 수상	Ji Sung	Won	
KBS Drama Awards	2013	Grand Prize (Daesang)	Secret Love	Nominated	
KBS Drama Awards	2013	Top Excellence Award, Actor	Secret Love	Won	
KBS Drama Awards	2013	Excellence Award, Actor in a Miniseries	Secret Love	Nominated	
KBS Drama Awards	2013	Netizen Award, Actor	Secret Love	Nominated	
KBS Drama Awards	2013	Popularity Award, Actor	Secret Love	Won	
KBS Drama Awards	2013	Best Couple Award with Hwang Jung-eum	Secret Love	Won	
Korea Best Dresser Swan Awards	2010	Best Dressed, Movie Actor category	Ji Sung	Won	
Korea Drama Awards	2015	Grand Prize (Daesang)	Kill Me, Heal Me	Nominated	
Korea PD Awards	2016	Best Performer, TV Actor category	Kill Me, Heal Me	Won	
MBC Drama Awards	2001	Best New Actor	The Rules of Marriage	Won	
MBC Drama Awards	2008	Excellence Award, Actor	New Heart	Nominated	
MBC Drama Awards	2008	Golden Acting Award, Actor in a Miniseries	New Heart	Won	
MBC Drama Awards	2008	Popularity Award, Actor	New Heart	Nominated	
MBC Drama Awards	2008	Best Couple Award with Kim Min-jung	New Heart	Nominated	
MBC Drama Awards	2011	Top Excellence Award, Actor in a Miniseries	Royal Family	Nominated	
MBC Drama Awards	2011	Popularity Award, Actor	Royal Family	Nominated	
MBC Drama Awards	2011	Best Couple Award with Yum Jung-ah	Royal Family	Nominated	
MBC Drama Awards	2015	Grand Prize (Daesang) (Determined through viewer's votes)	Kill Me, Heal Me	Won	
MBC Drama Awards	2015	Top Excellence Actor, Actor in a Miniseries	Kill Me, Heal Me	Won	
MBC Drama Awards	2015	Netizen Popularity Award	Kill Me, Heal Me	Nominated	
MBC Drama Awards	2015	Best Couple Award with Hwang Jung-eum	Kill Me, Heal Me	Nominated	
MBC Drama Awards	2015	Best Couple Award with Park Seo-joon	Kill Me, Heal Me	Won	
MBC Drama Awards	2015	Top 10 Stars	Kill Me, Heal Me	Won	
SBS Drama Awards	2001	New Star Award	Wonderful Days	Won	
SBS Drama Awards	2003	Excellence Award, Actor in a Drama Special	All In	Won	
SBS Drama Awards	2004	Top Excellence Award, Actor	Save the Last Dance for Me	Nominated	
SBS Drama Awards	2004	Excellence Award, Actor in a Drama Special	Save the Last Dance for Me	Nominated	
SBS Drama Awards	2004	Top 10 Stars	Save the Last Dance for Me	Won	
SBS Drama Awards	2009	Excellence Award, Actor in a Drama Special	Swallow the Sun	Nominated	
SBS Drama Awards	2009	Best Couple Award with Sung Yu-ri	Swallow the Sun	Nominated	
SBS Drama Awards	2011	Top Excellence Award, Actor in a Drama Special	Protect the Boss	Won	
SBS Drama Awards	2011	Top 10 Stars	Protect the Boss	Won	
SBS Drama Awards	2011	Best Couple Award with Choi Kang-hee	Protect the Boss	Won	
SBS Drama Awards	2012	Top Excellence Award, Actor in a Drama Special	The Great Seer	Nominated	
SBS Drama Awards	2016	Top Excellence Award, Actor in a Romantic Comedy Drama	Entertainer	Nominated	
SBS Drama Awards	2017	Grand Prize (Daesang)	Innocent Defendant	Won	
SBS Drama Awards	2017	Top Excellence Award, Actor in a Monday–Tuesday Drama	Innocent Defendant	Nominated	
SBS Drama Awards	2019	Grand Prize (Daesang)	Doctor John	Nominated	
SBS Drama Awards	2019	Top Excellence Award, Actor in a Miniseries	Doctor John	Nominated	
SBS Drama Awards	2019	Producer's Award	Doctor John	Nominated	
SBS Drama Awards	2019	Best Couple Award with Lee Se-young	Doctor John	Nominated	
SBS Drama Awards	2024	Grand Prize (Daesang)	Connection	Nominated	
SBS Drama Awards	2024	Producer's Award	Connection	Nominated	
SBS Drama Awards	2024	Best Couple Award with Jeon Mi-do	Connection	Nominated	
Seoul International Drama Awards	2015	Best Actor	Kill Me, Heal Me	Nominated	
Style Icon Awards	2011	Style Icon Actor / Bonsang	Ji Sung	Won	
The Seoul Awards	2017	Best Actor (Drama)	Innocent Defendant	Won	

=== State honors ===
Name of country, year given, and name of honor
Country or Organization	Year	Honor or Award	Ref.
South Korea (Note: Honors are given at the Korean Popular Culture and Arts Awards, arranged by the Korea Creative Content Agency and hosted by the Ministry of Culture, Sports and Tourism. They are awarded to those who have contributed to the arts and South Korea's pop culture.)	2017	Prime Minister's Commendation	
