= The Judge Returns =

2026 South Korean television series

- Promotional poster
- Hangul: 판사 이한영
- Lit.: Judge Lee Han-young
- RR: Pansa I Hanyeong
- MR: P'ansa I Hanyŏng
- Genre: Fantasy; Legal drama; Action; Revenge
- Based on: Judge Lee Han-young by Lee Hae-nal
- Written by: Kim Kwang-min
- Directed by: Lee Jae-jin; Park Mi-yeon
- Starring: Ji Sung; Park Hee-soon; Won Jin-ah
- Music by: Gaemi (CP)
- Opening theme: "Revenge" by Jeon Chan-woong
- Country of origin: South Korea
- Original language: Korean
- No. of episodes: 14

Production
- Executive producer: Hwang Jun-young
- Producers: Son Ok-hyun; Jeong Yeon-ji; Kim Seon-heung; Oh Tteuk-rak; Ji-hwan
- Running time: 60 minutes
- Production companies: OH Story; Slingshot Studio

Original release
- Network: MBC TV
- Release: January 2 – February 14, 2026

The Judge Returns (Korean: 판사 이한영) is a 2026 South Korean television series based on the Naver series of the same name by Lee Hae-nal and starring Ji Sung, Park Hee-soon, and Won Jin-ah. It aired on MBC TV from January 2 to February 14, 2026, every Friday and Saturday at 21:50 (KST). It is also available for streaming on Wavve and TVING in South Korea, and HBO Max in selected regions.

== Synopsis ==
A legal drama about an unjust judge Lee Han-young, who cries out, "Let's not judge others' lives as we please," regains consciousness after an untimely death and returns to the past to punish the wrongdoers and change his fate.

== Cast ==
=== Main ===
- Ji Sung as Lee Han-young: Judge of the South Chungcheong District Court.
- Park Hee-soon as Kang Shin-jin: A senior criminal judge at the Seoul Central District Court.
- Won Jin-ah as Kim Jin-ah: A public prosecutor in the Seoul Central District Prosecutor's Office.
- Tae Won-seok as Seok Jeong-ho: Han Young's best supporter and friend.
- Baek Jin-hee as Song Na-yeon: A reporter with a strong sense of justice, working in the legal affairs department of the Daejin Ilbo newspaper.
- Oh Se-young as Yoo Se-hee: Han-young's ex-wife, the youngest daughter of President Yoo Seon-cheol.
- Hwang Hee as Park Chul-woo: A public prosecutor in the Seoul Central District Prosecutor's Office.

==== Court people ====
- Kim Tae-woo as Baek Yi-seok: Chief Judge of South Chungcheong District Court.
- Kim Byeong-chun as Lim Jeong-sik: Criminal judge of Chungcheong District Court.

==== People around Kang Shin-jin ====
- Jung Hee-tae as Kim Ji-han: Chief Judge of the Criminal Division of the Seoul Central District Court.
- Jang Jae-ho as Kim Yun-hyeok: Judge in Chungcheong District Court.
- Son Byung-ho as Park Kwang-to: Former President.

==== Haenal Law Firm ====
- Ahn Nae-sang as Yoo Seon-cheol: President of Haenal Law.
- Heo Hyung-gyu as Yoo Jin-kwang: The eldest son of Haenal Law.
- Baek Seung-hee as Yu Ha-na: The eldest daughter of President Yoo Seon-cheol.

==== S Group ====
- Kim Beop-rae as Jang Tae-sik
- Kim Byeong-ki as Jang Yong-hyun

==== Lee Han-young's family and neighbors ====
- Jong Jae-seong as Lee Bong-sook
- Hwang Young-hee as Shin Nam-sook
- Seong Byeong-sook as Park Mal-rye
- Im Yul-ri as Han na-young

=== Special appearances ===
- Kim Dong-jun as Prosecutor Kang
- Kim Song-il as Choi Jong-hak
- Bae In-hyuk as Kim Sang-jin: serial killer who was sentenced to death by Lee Han-young
- Kim Myoung-su as a judge Hwang
- Lee Je-yeon as Park Hyeok-jun
- Jang Hee-ryung as Kim Ga-yeong
- Park Kyung-lim as herself
- Park Jeong-hak as Um Jun-ho
- Shin Hyun-jong as Heo Dong-ki
- Jeon Jin-ki as Woo Kyo-hun
- Choi Hong-il as Lee Chang-hyo

== Production ==
The series is based on the Naver Webtoon of the same name, created by Lee Hae-nal. It is directed by Lee Jae-jin, whose credits include The Third Marriage (2024) and Motel California (2025), and written by Kim Kwang-min. It is produced by OH Story, Slingshot Studio.

On June 17, 2025, the main cast was confirmed as Ji Sung, Won Jin-ah, and Park Hee-soon. Filming was announced to begin on that day. Baek Jin-hee joined the main cast on August 27, 2025.

== Viewership ==
The Judge Returns : South Korea viewers per episode (millions)

Season	Episode number														Average
Season	1	2	3	4	5	6	7	8	9	10	11	12	13	14	Average
1	0.829	0.806	1.032	1.138	1.783	2.125	2.109	2.047	2.449	1.992	2.354	2.167	2.375	2.369	1.827

Source: Audience measurement performed nationwide by Nielsen Media Research.

Average TV viewership ratings
Ep.	Original broadcast date	Average audience share (Nielsen Korea)	
Ep.	Original broadcast date	Nationwide	Seoul
1	January 2, 2026	4.3% (12th)	4.1% (11th)
2	January 3, 2026	4.4% (12th)	4.2% (13th)
3	January 9, 2026	5.8% (7th)	6.2% (6th)
4	January 10, 2026	5.8% (5th)	5.9% (4th)
5	January 16, 2026	10.0% (1st)	10.1% (1st)
6	January 17, 2026	11.0% (2nd)	11.4% (2nd)
7	January 23, 2026	11.4% (1st)	12.0% (1st)
8	January 24, 2026	10.8% (2nd)	10.8% (2nd)
9	January 30, 2026	13.5% (1st)	14.7% (1st)
10	January 31, 2026	10.9% (2nd)	11.7% (2nd)
11	February 6, 2026	13.2% (1st)	14.2% (1st)
12	February 7, 2026	11.5% (2nd)	12.1% (2nd)
13	February 13, 2026	13.6% (1st)	14.9% (1st)
14	February 14, 2026	12.8% (2nd)	13.2% (2nd)
Average		9.9%	10.4%
In the table above, the blue numbers represent the lowest ratings and the red numbers represent the highest ratings.

== Accolades ==
Award ceremony	Year	Category	Recipient(s)	Result	Ref.
Baeksang Arts Awards	2026	Best Actor	Ji Sung	Nominated	
