= Kim Yoo-ri =

South Korean actress (born 1984)

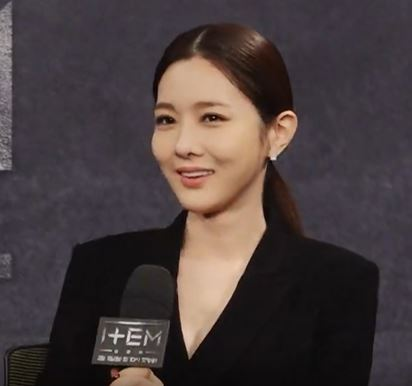
- Kim in 2019
- Born: August 29, 1984 (age 42); Busan, South Korea
- Education: Kyung Hee University - Visual Communication
- Occupation: Actress
- Years active: 2006–present
- Agent: C-JeS Entertainment

Korean name
- Hangul: 김유리
- RR: Gim Yuri
- MR: Kim Yuri

Kim Yoo-ri (Korean: 김유리; born August 29, 1984) is a South Korean actress.

== Career ==
She starred in the television dramas Cheongdam-dong Alice (2012) and Master's Sun (2013).

In September 2018, Kim signed with new management agency C-JeS Entertainment.

== Filmography ==
=== Television series ===
Year	Title	Role
2006	As the River Flows	Soon-geum
2009	The Road Home	Han Soo-mi
2010	Coffee House	Barista
2011	I Believe in Love	
2011	Royal Family	Go-eun
2011	Indomitable Daughters-in-Law	Im Ji-eun
2011	KBS TV Novel: "Dear My Sister"	Song Geum-joo
2012	Cheongdam-dong Alice	Shin In-hwa
2013	Master's Sun	Tae Yi-ryung
2014	Beyond the Clouds	Seo Jae-in
2015	Kill Me, Heal Me	Han Chae-yeon
2015	This is My Love	Jo Seo-ryung
2016	Marriage Contract	Seo Na-yoon
2019	Item	Han Yoo-na
2020	18 Again	Ok Hye-in
2023	Numbers	Jang Ji-soo

=== Film ===
Year	Title	Role
2006	Girl by Girl	
2010	Secret Love	

=== Music video appearances ===
Year	Song title	Artist
2011	"Endless Love"	J-Cera

== Awards and nominations ==
Year	Award	Category	Nominated work	Result
2013	2nd APAN Star Awards	Best New Actress	Cheongdam-dong Alice, Master's Sun	Won
2013	SBS Drama Awards	New Star Award	Cheongdam-dong Alice, Master's Sun	Won
2014	3rd APAN Star Awards	Best Dressed	—N/a	Won
2016	MBC Drama Awards	Excellence Award, Actress in a Special Project Drama	Marriage Contract	Nominated
2019	MBC Drama Awards	Excellence Award, Actress in a Monday-Tuesday Miniseries	Item	Nominated
