= The Thorn Birds (2011 TV series) =

2011 South Korean television series

- Promotional poster
- Hangul: 가시나무새
- RR: Gasinamusae
- MR: Kasinamusae
- Genre: Melodrama, Romance
- Written by: Lee Sun-hee
- Directed by: Kim Jong-chang
- Starring: Han Hye-jin; Joo Sang-wook; Kim Min-jung; Seo Do-young; Cha Hwa-yun
- Music by: Gaemi
- Country of origin: South Korea
- Original language: Korean
- No. of episodes: 20

Production
- Producer: Kim Jin-woo
- Running time: Wednesdays and Thursdays at 21:55
- Production company: GNG Production

Original release
- Network: Korean Broadcasting System (KBS2)
- Release: 2 March – 5 May 2011

The Thorn Birds (Korean: 가시나무새; RR: Gasinamusae) is a 2011 South Korean television series shown on KBS2, where one woman forsakes her love and family for her ambition while another woman embraces with love all that the former had left behind. Fates of a bit part actress Seo Jung-eun (played by Han Hye-jin) and a film producer Han Yoo-kyung (played by Kim Min-jung) who chose success are intertwined and resolved gradually as their mutual stories progress.

The "thorn birds" of the title refers to Jung-eun's character, who only brings out her best at the cost of great pain. A thornbird is a mythical bird who searches for a thorn tree from the day it is born. When it finds it, the bird impales itself upon the sharpest thorn, and rises above the agony to sing the most beautiful song ever heard.

== Cast ==
=== Main characters ===
- Han Hye-jin as Seo Jung-eun
  - Kim So-hyun as young Seo Jung-eun

Growing up she had to move from one welfare facility to another, after having been abandoned at birth. She had once been a promising actress but after plummeting to depths, she has since spent many years as a bit part actress. Embracing the baby and grandmother abandoned by her friend Yoo-kyung as her own family, she protects them, and in the process, heals her own wounds too. Meeting again her long-lost love Young-jo – with whom she had a precocious love at puberty but had to go their own ways due to a friend's jealousy - she resumes the love and leads him to success. Little did she know that he was the biological father of the child she has embraced as her own...

- Kim Min-jung as Han Yoo-kyung
  - Yoon Jung-eun as young Han Yoo-kyung

A film director. She has been Jung-eun's old friend but the two shouldn't have met at all. Behind her intelligence and elegant smile lie coldness. After finding out Young-jo's family is a rich conglomerate owner, she seduces him and even becomes pregnant with his child. But after seeing him giving up on his inheritance and leaving his family, she doesn't waste a second turning away from him, even from their child. She goes after a man with great background (Kang-woo) only for success but she finds her friend Jung-eun – whom she considered as foolish – has become more successful than her.

- Joo Sang-wook as Lee Young-jo
  - Lee Tae-ri (Note: Credited as Lee Min-ho.) as young Lee Young-jo

A film producer. A tragic character and an illegitimate child of a conglomerate's owner. Giving up on a great inheritance and losing Yoo-kyung, he starts his own modest business from the bottom, learning things each day. His first love Jung-eun whom he had loved protects him like a guardian angel. As they rediscover their love and it matures, great secrets are discovered one by one... As his former love Yoo-kyung re-appears, another conflict ensues.

- Seo Do-young as Choi Kang-woo

A film director. Mesmerized by Jung-eun after meeting her at a movie shoot, he does his utmost for her with his heart fully concealed, but they break up after a silly argument. Meeting her again by chance few months later, he discovers that she has become a mother of a child, heaps scorn on her, and turns away. He can't help feeling sad by and sympathetic toward Jung-eun whom he keeps running into at job. He acts like a heartless brute in front of her but helps her secretly, and rejoices in seeing her becoming a star after long years as an unknown.

=== Supporting characters ===
- Cha Hwa-yeon as Yoon Myung-ja / Lee Ae-rin
- Kim Ha-eun as Yang Mi-ryun
- Song Ok-sook as Kim Kye-soon
- Choi Jae-won as Park Han-soo
  - Kim Dong-young as young Han-soo
- Jung Ui-kap as Lee Young-gook
- Park Ji-il as Choi Jong-dal
- Ahn Seung-hoon as Yoon Myung-goo
- Lee Mi-young as Soon-geum
- Jung Eun-byul as Seo Jin
- Oh Hyun-kyung as Young-jo's grandfather
- Lee Won-jae as Yoon Hak-goo
- Choi Sang-hoon as Seo Jin's father
- Jung Kyung-soon as Yoo-kyung's adoptive mother
- Jang Min-ho as Lee Soo-young
- Jang Yong (cameo)
- Kim Ji-young

== Ratings ==
Date	Episode	Nationwide	Seoul
2011-03-02	01	6.3%	8.6%
2011-03-03	02	6.6%	8.1%
2011-03-09	03	7.0%	8.1%
2011-03-10	04	6.3%	8.1%
2011-03-16	05	8.1% (17th)	8.6% (20th)
2011-03-17	06	8.3% (17th)	9.0% (15th)
2011-03-23	07	8.7% (18th)	8.9% (15th)
2011-03-24	08	8.5% (18th)	8.4%
2011-03-30	09	9.4% (15th)	9.8% (12th)
2011-03-31	10	9.8% (17th)	10.8% (11th)
2011-04-06	11	9.2% (16th)	10.5% (11th)
2011-04-07	12	9.4% (18th)	10.8% (11th)
2011-04-13	13	9.7% (11th)	10.1% (10th)
2011-04-14	14	10.7% (9th)	11.7% (9th)
2011-04-20	15	10.8% (6th)	10.7% (8th)
2011-04-21	16	9.5% (12th)	10.0% (13th)
2011-04-27	17	10.9% (6th)	11.8% (8th)
2011-04-28	18	9.6% (12th)	10.1% (11th)
2011-05-04	19	11.1% (4th)	12.2% (5th)
2011-05-05	20	11.5% (5th)	12.8% (6th)
Average		9.1%	9.9%

Source: TNS Media Korea
