= Steal Heart =

2014 South Korean television series

- Promotional poster
- Also known as: Yu-na's Street
- Hangul: 유나의 거리
- RR: Yunaui geori
- MR: Yunaŭi kŏri
- Genre: Romance; Comedy; Family; Crime
- Written by: Kim Woon-kyung
- Directed by: Im Tae-woo; Kim Jae-hong
- Starring: Kim Ok-vin; Lee Hee-joon
- Country of origin: South Korea
- Original language: Korean
- No. of episodes: 50

Production
- Executive producer: Park Joon-seo
- Producer: Park Sang-eok
- Production location: Korea
- Running time: 60 minutes
- Production company: Drama House

Original release
- Network: JTBC
- Release: May 19 – November 11, 2014

Steal Heart (Korean: 유나의 거리; lit. 'Yoo-na's Street') is a 2014 South Korean television series starring Kim Ok-vin and Lee Hee-joon. It aired on JTBC from May 19 to November 11, 2014, on Mondays and Tuesdays at 21:50 (KST) for 50 episodes.

== Synopsis ==
Kang Yoo-na (Kim Ok-vin) is the daughter of a pickpocket who learned the trade from her father and is already famous in her own right (with a prolific rap sheet of her very own, and three prior convictions). After being released from prison, she works as a part-time barista at a friend's café, but sometimes goes back to her old habits. Yoo-na shares a multiplex house with a rag-tag group of personalities, including an ex-gangster, a call girl, and a day laborer. They may not have much to boast about, but they are bright and warm people who live their daily lives to the fullest.

Things take an interesting turn when they get a new neighbor — unemployed but seemingly pure-hearted Kim Chang-man (Lee Hee-joon) moves in. Chang-man is an aspiring social worker, and as Yoo-na gets to know the salt-of-the-earth good boy next door, he starts to change them all for the better. Residing together under the same roof, they come to understand each other and mend their past wounds.

== Cast ==
- Kim Ok-vin as Kang Yoo-na
- Lee Hee-joon as Kim Chang-man
- Lee Moon-sik as Han Man-bok
- Shin So-yul as Han Da-young
- Kim Hee-jung as Madam Hong
- Baek Chang-min as Han Dong-min
- Jung Jong-joon as Old man Jang
- Jo Hee-bong as Hong Gye-pal
- Seo Yoo-jung as Kim Mi-sun
- Kim Young-woong as Byun Chil-bok
- Kim Eun-soo as Uhm Hye-sook
- Ahn Nae-sang as Bong Dal-ho
- Kang Shin-hyo as Kim Nam-soo
- Oh Na-ra as Park Yang-soon
- Im Hyun-sik as Kang Bok-chun
- Kim Min-ki as Yoon Min-kyu
- Yoon Da-hoon as Jung Da-hoon
- Ha Eun-seol as Yoon-ji
- Yoo Gun as Tae-sik
- Kim Yoon-joo as Chan-mi
- Ra Mi-ran as Kkang-soon
- Ryu Hye-rin as Hwa-sook
- Song Sam-dong as Dae-gil
- Shin Hyun-tak as Im Dong-ho
- Song Chae-hwan as Hwang Jung-hyun
- Yoon Yong-hyun as Baendaeng-yi
- Lee Je-shin as Jjang-gu's mother
- Ki Jung-soo as president of second-hand shop
- Jung Yoo-min as Kim Young-mi
- Han Kap-soo as Kim Jong-ho
- Yoon Sang as Director Lee
- Joo Min-kyung as Jin-mi
- Shin Dong-mi as Hong Gye-sook
- Hong Seok-yeon as Doksa
- Choi Beom-ho as President Kwak
- Lee Bit-na as Hyun-jung
- Kim Joo-young as Jung Yong-geun
- Jung Ah-rang as Hee-young
- Moon Jung-soo as Mang-chi
- Park Woo-chun as Noh Ho-jin
- Choi Jung-hwa as staff of administration office
- Oh Eun-chan as Hyun-chul
- Hwang Tae-kwang
- Jung Ae-hwa

== Ratings ==
In this table, the blue numbers represent the lowest ratings and the red numbers represent the highest ratings.

| Ep. | Original broadcast date | Average audience share |
| Ep. | Original broadcast date | AGB Nielsen |
| Ep. | Original broadcast date | Nationwide |
|---|---|---|
| 1 | May 19, 2014 | 1.616% |
| 2 | May 20, 2014 | 1.945% |
| 3 | May 26, 2014 | 2.251% |
| 4 | May 27, 2014 | 2.222% |
| 5 | June 3, 2014 | 2.141% |
| 6 | June 9, 2014 | 1.990% |
| 7 | June 10, 2014 | 1.744% |
| 8 | June 16, 2014 | 1.766% |
| 9 | June 17, 2014 | 1.925% |
| 10 | June 23, 2014 | 1.897% |
| 11 | June 24, 2014 | 2.196% |
| 12 | June 30, 2014 | 2.151% |
| 13 | July 1, 2014 | 2.262% |
| 14 | July 7, 2014 | 2.113% |
| 15 | July 8, 2014 | 2.169% |
| 16 | July 14, 2014 | 1.911% |
| 17 | July 15, 2014 | 2.250% |
| 18 | July 21, 2014 | 2.173% |
| 19 | July 22, 2014 | 2.489% |
| 20 | July 28, 2014 | 1.958% |
| 21 | July 29, 2014 | 1.888% |
| 22 | August 4, 2014 | 2.288% |
| 23 | August 5, 2014 | 2.553% |
| 24 | August 11, 2014 | 2.291% |
| 25 | August 12, 2014 | 2.420% |
| 26 | August 18, 2014 | 2.292% |
| 27 | August 19, 2014 | 2.172% |
| 28 | August 25, 2014 | 2.363% |
| 29 | August 26, 2014 | 2.211% |
| 30 | September 1, 2014 | 1.951% |
| 31 | September 2, 2014 | 2.463% |
| 32 | September 9, 2014 | 2.132% |
| 33 | September 15, 2014 | 2.468% |
| 34 | September 16, 2014 | 1.963% |
| 35 | September 22, 2014 | 1.746% |
| 36 | September 23, 2014 | 2.288% |
| 37 | September 29, 2014 | 1.967% |
| 38 | September 30, 2014 | 2.460% |
| 39 | October 6, 2014 | 2.440% |
| 40 | October 7, 2014 | 2.380% |
| 41 | October 13, 2014 | 1.864% |
| 42 | October 14, 2014 | 2.176% |
| 43 | October 20, 2014 | 2.254% |
| 44 | October 21, 2014 | 2.223% |
| 45 | October 27, 2014 | 2.105% |
| 46 | October 28, 2014 | 2.802% |
| 47 | November 3, 2014 | 2.568% |
| 48 | November 4, 2014 | 2.839% |
| 49 | November 10, 2014 | 2.403% |
| 50 | November 11, 2014 | 2.684% |
| Average | | 2.197% |

- This drama airs on a cable channel/pay TV which normally has a relatively smaller audience compared to free-to-air TV/public broadcasters (KBS, SBS, MBC and EBS).

== Awards and nominations ==
| Year | Award | Category | Recipient | Result |
|---|---|---|---|---|
| 2014 | 3rd APAN Star Awards | Excellence Award, Actress in a Serial Drama | Kim Ok-vin | Won |
| 2015 | 51st Baeksang Arts Awards | Best Drama | Steal Heart | Nominated |
| 2015 | 51st Baeksang Arts Awards | Best Actress | Kim Ok-vin | Nominated |
| 2015 | 51st Baeksang Arts Awards | Best Screenplay | Kim Woon-kyung | Nominated |
| 2015 | 10th Seoul International Drama Awards | Best Series Drama | Steal Heart | Nominated |
| 2015 | 10th Seoul International Drama Awards | Best Screenwriter | Kim Woon-kyung | Nominated |
| 2015 | 8th Korea Drama Awards | Best Screenplay | Kim Woon-kyung | Nominated |

== International broadcast ==
- It aired in Vietnam from October 29, 2015, on VTV3 under the title Trái tim bị đánh cắp.
