= Seo Yoo-jung =

South Korean actress (born 1978)

- Born: Lee Yoo-jung; 31 December 1978 (age 47); Seoul, South Korea
- Other name: Seo Yoo-jeong
- Education: Hanyang University (Department of Theater and Film)
- Occupation: Actress
- Years active: 1996–present
- Agent: MGB Entertainment
- Known for: Steal Heart; Bloody Heart; Mr. Sunshine
- Spouse: Jeong Hyeong-jin (m. 2017; div. 2023)
- Children: 1
- Parent: Park Soon-im (mother)

Seo Yoo-jung is a South Korean actress. She is known for her roles in dramas such as Forbidden Love, Steal Heart, Family's Honor, Mr. Sunshine, Royal Family, If Tomorrow Comes and Bloody Heart.

== Personal life ==
In 2017, she married an office worker named Jeong Hyeong-jin at a wedding hall in Samseong-dong, Seoul and later had one daughter. On February 24, 2023, Seo announced that they had recently gotten divorced.

== Filmography ==
=== Television series ===
| Year | Title | Role | Ref. |
|---|---|---|---|
| 1997 | You and I | Park Sang-ok | |
| 1999 | Who Are You? | Kim Yu-jin | |
| 1999 | Into the Sunlight | Kang Jae-sook | |
| 2001 | Navy | Kim Yoo-jin | |
| 2002 | Drama City: "Very Special Companion" | Young-ran | |
| 2003 | A Saint and a Witch | Moon Ha-ran | |
| 2004 | Forbidden Love | Jung Se-kyung | |
| 2005 | My Sweetheart My Darling | Lee Seon-mi | |
| 2007 | New Heart | Ms. Jung | |
| 2008 | Family's Honor | Kim Hyun-ok | |
| 2008 | Drama City: "The Secret Only You Don't Know" | Yoo-jung | |
| 2008 | Manners of Battle | Hyun Ji-woo | |
| 2008 | Life Special Investigation Team | Kim Mi-joo | |
| 2008 | Robber | Oh-joon's ex-girlfriend | |
| 2009 | Hometown Legends | Hong-bin | |
| 2010 | Pink Lipstick | Kim Mi-ran | |
| 2011 | Royal Family | Yang Ki-jung | |
| 2011 | If Tomorrow Comes | Hyun-sook | |
| 2014 | KBS Drama Special: "First Birthday" | Kyung-joo | |
| 2014 | Steal Heart | Kim Mi-sun | |
| 2015 | Hidden Identity | Eom In-kyung | |
| 2016 | The Unusual Family | Seol Gong-joo | |
| 2018 | Quiz of God | Shin Yeon-hwa | |
| 2018 | Mr. Sunshine | Hong-pa | |
| 2022 | Bloody Heart | Madam Yoon | |

=== Film ===
| Year | Title | | Role |
| Year | English | Korean | Role |
|---|---|---|---|
| 2007 | Someone Behind You | 두 사람이다 | Kim Jung-sun |
| 2009 | Fortune Salon | 청담보살 | Joo-jeong |
| 2009 | After the Banquet | 결혼식 후에 | Choi Min-hee |

== Awards and nominations ==
Name of the award ceremony, year presented, category, nominee of the award, and the result of the nomination
| Award ceremony | Year | Category | Result | Ref. |
|---|---|---|---|---|
| MBC Drama Awards | 1998 | Best New Actress | Won | |
