= Royal Family (TV series) =

2011 South Korean television series

- Promotional poster for Royal Family
- Genre: Family drama; Romance; Melodrama
- Based on: Proof of the Man by Seiichi Morimura
- Written by: Kim Young-hyun; Kwon Eun-mi; Park Sang-yeon
- Directed by: Kim Do-hoon
- Starring: Yum Jung-ah; Ji Sung; Kim Young-ae
- Music by: Kim Jun-seok; Jeong Se-rin
- Country of origin: South Korea
- Original language: Korean
- No. of episodes: 18

Production
- Producer: Han Hee (MBC)
- Production companies: Future 1 CJ Media

Original release
- Network: MBC TV
- Release: March 2 – April 28, 2011

Royal Family (Korean: 로열 패밀리) is a 2011 South Korean television series that explores the dark side of wealth and the power of love to fight the system. Yum Jung-ah and Ji Sung play two childhood friends who grow up supporting each other through poverty and all other obstacles, and when they meet again years later, stand by each other as they rise in society's ranks. It aired on MBC TV from March 2 to April 28, 2011 on Wednesdays and Thursdays at 21:55 for 18 episodes.

== Plot ==
After marrying into a wealthy and powerful chaebol family (considered by some as Korea's modern-day "royalty"), Kim In-sook's (Yum Jung-ah) life becomes a living hell. Looked down on by her in-laws as a gold-digging intruder, she's ignored and treated as a shadow for years. When her husband is killed in a helicopter accident, her mother-in-law (Kim Young-ae) takes In-sook's son away. Enter Han Ji-hoon (Ji Sung), the powerhouse new lawyer of the family, who knows In-sook from the past. Ji-hoon becomes determined to put a stop to the oppressive situation she's been in for 18 years.

When In-sook finally decides that she has had enough and launches a bold plan to take over the family company, Ji-hoon will be there at her side, no matter what it costs him. The two begin to play a dangerous double game, but in the midst of their battle for survival, their hearts are drawn together in a passion that could cost them everything.

== Cast ==
- Yum Jung-ah as Kim In-sook - She has a motherly heart for Ji-hoon and Hyun-jin, but a plan that is filled with vengeance. She isn't all she appears to be on the outside.
- Ji Sung as Han Ji-hoon - He has a tragic past that he doesn't remember, yet he overcomes his underprivileged childhood and becomes a competent prosecutor. He joins JK Group and sacrifices his all to help In-sook become the head of the conglomerate because he considers her his saviour.
- Kim Young-ae as Gong Soon-ho - The ruthless mother-in-law of Kim In-sook, and after her son's death takes custody of her grandson. She is a cold-hearted woman, even to her children, who believes cruelty is the only way she can teach them how to survive. However, she could never bear a betrayal from her own flesh and blood, and loves Hyun-jin whom she believes is coming into her own perfectly.
- Cha Ye-ryun as Jo Hyun-jin - The youngest child and only daughter of Gong Soon-ho and her mother's favourite. She is unlike the rest of her scheming family. She is deeply saddened of her brother's death and was the only one to shed tears once her brother was pronounced dead in the hospital. Hyun-jin is also the only one to give In-sook the respect that she deserves. She is well liked by employees and others. She is in a constant battle with her sisters-in-law but they are no match for Hyun-jin's ability to look at the big picture. Instead of going head to head, Hyun-jin usually walks around the war that usually plagues her brother's and their wives, and by the time anyone notices Hyun-jin has already crossed the finish line. She resembles In-sook's heart with Soon-ho's smarts and ruthlessness, creating the perfect combination of a true JK woman. She has endured a lifetime of coldness from her mother, however she believes it is the cost of being her daughter. She takes over her mother's company in the finale and proves to be a very capable leader, using In-sook's kindness and her mother's cunningness.
- Jeon No-min as Uhm Ki-do
- Jeon Mi-seon as Im Yoon-seo
- Seo Yoo-jung as Yang Ki-jung
- Ahn Nae-sang as Jo Dong-jin
- Kim Young-pil as Jo Dong-ho - the loving husband of In-sook and adoring brother of Hyun-jin.
- Kim Jung-hak as Jo Dong-min
- Dokgo Young-jae as Kim Tae-hyuk
- Shin Dong-ho as Jo Byung-joon
- Ki Tae-young as Kang Choong-ki
- Lee Ki-young as Kang Il-shik
- Jo Sang-ki as James Dean
- Ryu Dam as Kkak-chi
- Kim Hye-ok as Seo Soon-ae
- Lee Chae-young as Park Min-kyung
- Ha Yeon-joo as Ji-eun
- Choi Yoon-so as Yoo Shin-ah
- Jeon Soo-kyeong as Carrie Kim
- Min Joon-hyun as adviser
- Kim Hyun-seok as Yoon-seo's sister
- Kim Yoo-ri as Go-eun
- Peter Holman as Johnny Hayward
- Lee Da-hee as Prosecutor Lee Yoo Jin

== Ratings ==
Date	Episode	Nationwide	Seoul
2011-03-02	1	5.8%	8.6%
2011-03-03	2	5.6%	8.1%
2011-03-09	3	7.4%	9.3% (14th)
2011-03-10	4	6.0%	8.5% (16th)
2011-03-16	5	10.6% (9th)	13.8% (3rd)
2011-03-17	6	11.4% (6th)	14.4% (3rd)
2011-03-23	7	12.1% (5th)	15.7% (3rd)
2011-03-24	8	11.9% (8th)	15.6% (4th)
2011-03-30	9	11.1% (7th)	12.8% (6th)
2011-03-31	10	11.1% (8th)	13.8% (5th)
2011-04-06	11	9.7% (13th)	11.9% (6th)
2011-04-07	12	10.1% (15th)	12.1% (9th)
2011-04-13	13	9.0% (12th)	10.6% (7th)
2011-04-14	14	9.5% (14th)	11.9% (8th)
2011-04-20	15	10.0% (9th)	12.8% (5th)
2011-04-21	16	10.3% (7th)	13.2% (5th)
2011-04-27	17	10.4% (11th)	13.3% (6th)
2011-04-28	18	10.8% (6th)	13.9% (3rd)
Average		9.6%	-

Source: TNS Media Korea

== Awards and nominations ==
Year	Award	Category	Recipient	Result
2011	4th Korea Drama Awards	Best Production Director	Kim Do-hoon	Nominated
2011	4th Korea Drama Awards	Best Actress	Yum Jung-ah	Won
2011	MBC Drama Awards	Drama of the Year	Royal Family	Nominated
2011	MBC Drama Awards	Top Excellence Award, Actor in a Miniseries	Ji Sung	Nominated
2011	MBC Drama Awards	Top Excellence Award, Actress in a Miniseries	Yum Jung-ah	Nominated
2011	MBC Drama Awards	Best New Actress in a Miniseries	Cha Ye-ryun	Nominated
2011	MBC Drama Awards	Special Acting Award	Kim Young-ae	Won
2011	MBC Drama Awards	Popularity Award, Actor	Ji Sung	Nominated
2011	MBC Drama Awards	Best Couple Award	Ji Sung and Yum Jung-ah	Nominated

== International broadcast ==
- Thailand – TVK Channel Weekends at 21:00 (Starting early 2016)
- Indonesia - RTV Monday to Friday at 21:30 WIB Starting 6 May 2016.
