= Ahn Nae-sang =

South Korean actor (born 1964)

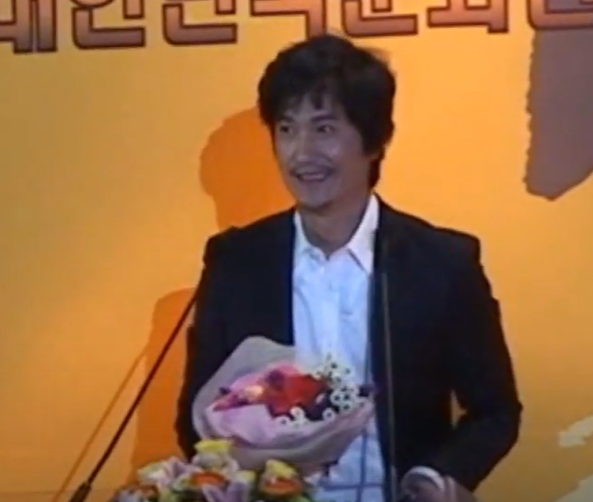
- Ahn in 2017
- Born: December 25, 1964 (age 61); Daegu, South Korea
- Education: Yonsei University – Theology
- Occupation: Actor
- Years active: 1994–present

Korean name
- Hangul: 안내상
- Hanja: 安內相
- RR: An Naesang
- MR: An Naesang

Ahn Nae-sang (Korean: 안내상; born December 25, 1964) is a South Korean actor. He began his career on the stage, and in 1994 made his film debut in the Bong Joon-ho short film Baeksekin ("White Man" or "White-collar worker"), followed by Jang Sun-woo's Bad Movie in 1997. He has since starred in numerous films, with supporting roles in Lee Chang-dong's Oasis and Poetry, and a leading role in Hoichori ("Cane"). He also appears in television series, notably Conspiracy in the Court, First Wives' Club, Three Brothers, High Kick: Revenge of the Short Legged, and The Light in Your Eyes.

== Filmography ==
=== Film ===
Year	English title	Role	Notes
1994	Baeksekin		Short film
1997	Bad Movie	Homeless man	
2000	Ghost Taxi		
2000	Umbrella		Short film
2000	A Masterpiece in My Life		
2001	Story Blind		Short film
2001	Diana		Short film
2002	Public Enemy	Detective Lee	
2002	Jungle Juice		
2002	Oasis	Hong Jong-il	
2002	2424		
2003	Scent of Love	Mister Park	
2003	The First Amendment of Korea		
2003	Once Upon a Time in a Battlefield	Kim Beob-min	
2004	Once Upon a Time in High School	Math teacher	
2004	When I Turned Nine	Teacher Dam-im	
2004	To Catch a Virgin Ghost	Mutt	
2004	R-Point	Captain Kang	
2004	Desire	Gyu-min	
2005	Sookja	Husband	Short film
2005	Marathon	Hee-geun (Cho-won's dad)	
2005	Never to Lose	Section Chief Park	
2006	Forbidden Quest	King	
2006	Fly, Daddy, Fly		cameo
2006	Mission Sex Control	Chang-soo	
2007	I Want You To Believe Me		
2007	Paradise Murdered	Engineer Lee	
2007	Temptation of Eve: A Good Wife		
2007	Someone Behind You	Ga-in's home room teacher	
2008	Fate	Cha Kang-sub	
2009	Thirsty, Thirsty	Chief So	
2010	Poetry	Gi-beom's father	
2011	Hoichori	Doo-yul	
2011	Boy	Father	
2012	Hand in Hand	Doctor	cameo
2012	Grape Candy	Manager Park	cameo
2012	Love Clinique	Street stall customer	cameo
2013	One Perfect Day	Woon-chul's father	Short film
2013	Tumbleweed	Do-seok	
2014	The Pirates	Jeong Do-jeon	
2016	The Last Princess	Kim Hwang-jin	
2018	Detective K: Secret of the Living Dead	Bang Hyo-in	cameo
2018	The Soup	Jae-goo's Older Brother	
2019	Killed my Wife	Choi Dae-yeon	
2020	Beyond That Mountain	Sou-hwan's father	
2020	Steel Rain 2: Summit	Minister of National Defense	
2023	12.12: The Day	Han Young-gu	
2024	Walker		
2025	The Pact	jung hyun-soo	

=== Television series ===
Year	Title		Role	Ref.
Year	English	Korean	Role	Ref.
2004	Drama City – "Anagram"	드라마 시티 – 아나그램	Seo Jeong-mun	
2004	Drama City – "Translucent"			
2004	Not Alone	혼자가 아니야	Editor-in-chief	
2004	Immortal Admiral Yi Sun-sin	불멸의 이순신		
2005	Sharp 2	반올림 2	Choi Jong-beom (cameo)	
2005	Eighteen, Twenty-Nine	열여덟, 스물아홉	Seo Yoon-oh	
2005	Love Hymn	사랑찬가	Chef	
2005	Resurrection	부활	Yoo Geon-ha	
2005	Drama City – "Oh! Sarah"	오!사라	Il-du	
2006	Sharp 3	반올림 3	Choi Jong-beom	
2006	Famous Chil Princesses	소문난 칠공주	Hwang Sun-taek	
2006	A Salmon's Dream	연어의 꿈	Gu Tae-jun	
2006	Digital Dasepo Girl	시리즈 다세포 소녀	Radish teacher	
2007	The Return of Shim Chung	심청의 귀환	Magistrate Hwang	
2007	Crime 1			
2007	Conspiracy in the Court	한성별곡	King	
2007	First Wives' Club	조강지처 클럽	Han Won-soo	
2007	Chosun Police 1	별순검 시즌1	Bae Bok-geun	
2008	Tazza	타짜	Go-ni's father	
2008	Chosun Police 2	별순검 시즌2	Bae Bok-geun	
2009	Cain and Abel	카인과 아벨	Jo Hyeon-taek	
2009	The Slingshot	남자 이야기	Kim Wook	
2009	Cinderella Man	신데렐라 맨	Lee Joon Hee's father (cameo)	
2009	Swallow the Sun	태양을 삼켜라	Lee Soo-chang (cameo)	
2009	Temptation of an Angel	천사의 유혹	Detective (cameo)	
2009	Three Brothers	수상한 삼형제	Kim Geon-gang	
2010	Sungkyunkwan Scandal	성균관 스캔들	Jeong Yak-yong	
2010	Chosun Police 3	별순검 시즌3	Bae Bok-geun (cameo)	
2010	Sunday Drama – "Jo Eun-ji's Family"	베스트 극장 – 조은지 패밀리	Tae-pyeong	
2011	My Princess	마이 프린세스	King Soonjong (cameo)	
2011	Royal Family	로열 패밀리	Jo Dong-jin	
2011	Protect the Boss	보스를 지켜라	Loan shark (cameo)	
2011	Living in Style	폼나게 살거야	(cameo)	
2011	High Kick: Revenge of the Short Legged	하이킥! 짧은 다리의 역습	Ahn Nae-sang	
2011	Glory Jane	영광의 재인	Yoon Il-goo	
2011	Living Among the Rich	청담동 살아요	(cameo)	
2012	Moon Embracing the Sun	해를 품은 달	King Sungjo	
2012	Quiz of God 3	신의 퀴즈 시즌3	Bae Tae-sik	
2012	May Queen	메이퀸	Cheon Hong-cheol	
2012	Family Photo	가족사진	Han Sang-tae	
2012	KBS Drama Special – "Pandemonium"	드라마 스페셜 – 복마전	Im Yeong-nam	
2013	7th Grade Civil Servant	7급공무원	Kim Won-seok	
2013	Wonderful Mama	원더풀 마마	Jang Gi-nam	
2013	All About My Romance	내 연애의 모든 것	Professor Song (cameo)	
2013	Monstar	몬스타	Han Ji-woong	
2013	Ugly Alert	못난이주의보	Gong Sang-man	
2013	Medical Top Team	메디컬탑팀	Jang Yong-seob	
2013	Golden Rainbow	황금무지개	Cheon Eok-jo	
2013	Infinite Power	무한동력	Han Won-sik	
2013-14	Potato Star 2013QR3	감자별 2013QR3	(cameo)	
2014	Wonderful Days	참 좋은 시절	Song Gyung-pil (cameo)	
2014	Jang Bo-ri Is Here!	왔다! 장보리	Soo-bong	
2014	Steal Heart	유나의 거리	Bong Dal-ho	
2014	KBS Drama Special – "The Tale of the Bookworm"	간서치열전	Heo Gyun	
2015	More Than a Maid	하녀들	King Taejong of Joseon	
2015	Kill Me, Heal Me	킬미, 힐미	Cha Joon-pyo	
2015	Run Toward Tomorrow	내일을 향해 뛰어라	Kang Ga-deuk	
2015	Love on a Rooftop	오늘부터 사랑해	Yoon Dae-ho	
2015	Splendid Politics	화정	Heo Gyun	
2015	My First Time	처음이라서	Yoon Tae-oh's father	
2015	Songgot: The Piercer	송곳	Goo Go-sin	
2015–16	My Daughter, Geum Sa-wol	내 딸, 금사월	Joo Gi-hwang	
2016	Happy Home	가화만사성	Man-seok	
2016	Entertainer	딴따라	Director Byeon	
2016	You Are a Gift	당신은선물	Professor Han	
2016	Squad 38	사기동대	Cheon Gap-soo	
2016	Love in the Moonlight	구르미 그린 달빛	Jeong Yak-yong	
2016-17	Golden Pouch	황금주머니	Geum Jeong-do	
2016-17	Solomon's Perjury	솔로몬의 위증	Go Sang-joong	
2017	The Rebel	역적 : 백성을 훔친 도적	Song Do-hwan	
2017	Band of Sisters	언니는 살아있다	Na Dae-in	
2017	Temperature of Love	사랑의 온도	On Jeong-seon's father	
2017–18	Rain or Shine	그냥 사랑하는 사이	Ha Dong-cheol	
2018	Misty	미스티	Kang Gi-joon	
2018	Lawless Lawyer	무법 변호사	Choi Dae-woong	
2018	Ms. Hammurabi	미스 함무라비	Principal Manager	
2018	Your Honor	친애하는 판사님께	Judge (cameo)	
2018	The Guest	손	Priest Yang	
2018	Heart Surgeons	흉부외과 – 심장을 훔친 의사들	Koo Hee-dong	
2018	The Last Empress	황후의 품격	Detective Ahn (cameo)	
2018–19	Less Than Evil	나쁜형사	Chae Han-seok (cameo)	
2019	Liver or Die	왜그래 풍상씨	Housekeeper's husband (cameo)	
2019	Blessing of the Sea	용왕님 보우하사	Sim Hak-gyoo	
2019	Legal High	리갈하이	Seo Jae-in's father (cameo)	
2019	The Light in Your Eyes	눈이 부시게	Lee Dae-sang	
2019	The Banker	더 뱅커	Yook Gwan-sik	
2019	Beautiful World	아름다운 세상	Doctor (cameo)	
2019	Designated Survivor: 60 Days	일, 지정생존자	Kang Sang-goo	
2019	My Country: The New Age	나의 나라	Nam Jeon	
2019	JTBC Drama Festa – "Luwak Human"	드라마 페스타 – 루왁인간	Jeong Cha-sik	
2020	Hi Bye, Mama!	하이바이, 마마!	Professor Jang	
2020	Welcome	어서와	Kim Soo-pyeong	
2020	Eccentric! Chef Moon	유별나! 문셰프	Im Cheol-yong	
2020	Memorials	출사표	Jo Maeng-deok	
2020	More Than Friends	경우의 수	Lee Young-hwan	
2020	18 Again	18 어게인	Moon Sang-hwi	
2020	My Dangerous Wife	나의 위험한 아내	Noh Chang-beom	
2020	Do Do Sol Sol La La Sol	도도솔솔라라솔	Secretary Moon	
2020–21	Royal Secret Agent	암행어사: 조선비밀수사단	Jang Tae-seung	
2021	L.U.C.A.: The Beginning		Ryu Joong-Kwon	
2021	Mouse	마우스	Park Du-Seok	
2021	Law School		Seo Byeong-Joo	
2021	Racket Boys	라켓소년단	Coach Fang, national team coach	
2021	The Devil Judge	악마판사	Min Jeong-ho	
2021	The Road: The Tragedy of One	더 로드: 1의 비극	Choi Nam-gyu	
2021	KBS Drama Special – "Nap on the Desert"	통증의 풍경	Lee Hyeong-jae	
2021	Free	공짜	Changsoo	
2022	Bloody Heart	붉은 단심	King Seonjong	
2022	Poong, the Joseon Psychiatrist	조선 정신과 의사 유세풍	King (Cameo, Ep. 1)	
2022	Curtain Call	커튼콜	A doctor (Cameo)	
2023	The Secret Romantic Guesthouse	꽃선비 열애사	Shin Won-ho	
2023	Pandora: Beneath the Paradise	판도라: 조작된 낙원	Jang Geum-mo	
2023	Miraculous Brothers	기적의 형제	Lee Byung-man	
2023	My Lovely Liar	소용없어 거짓말	Mok Tae-seop	
2023-24	The Third Marriage	세 번째 결혼	Shin Duk-Soo	
2024	Black Out	백설공주에게 죽음을	Ko Chang-Soo (Cameo)	
2024	Your Honor	유어 아너	Kang Moon-Suk	
2024	Bad Memory Eraser	나쁜 기억 지우개	Ahn Hyo-Myeong (Cameo)	
2025	The Witch	마녀	Park Byeong-jae	
2025	The Haunted Palace	귀궁	Choi Won-U	
2025	The Judge Returns	판사 이한영	Yoo Seon-cheol	

=== Web show ===
Year	Title	Role	Notes
2018–2021	Busted!	Detective K	Season 1

=== Variety show ===
- Off to School (Jtbc,2015 Ep 47–50)
- NSA Investigation Team (jTBC, 2013)
- Delicious Story (SBS, 2007)

== Theater ==
- If I Am with You (너와 함께라면, 2012)
- A Midsummer Night's Dream (2009)
- Dandelion Becomes Wind (민들레 바람되어, 2009)
- Liar

== Awards and nominations ==
Year	Award	Category	Recipient	Result	Ref.
2008	2nd Korea Drama Awards	Excellence Award, Actor	First Wives' Club	Nominated	
2008	16th Korean Culture and Entertainment Awards	Excellence Award	First Wives' Club	Won	
2008	SBS Drama Awards	Excellence Award, Actor in a Serial Drama	First Wives' Club	Won	
2008	SBS Drama Awards	Top 10 Stars	First Wives' Club	Won	
2009	KBS Drama Awards	Excellence Award, Actor in a Serial Drama	Three Brothers	Nominated	
2010	11th Korea Visual Arts Festival	Photogenic Award, TV Actor	Three Brothers	Won	
2011	2011 MBC Entertainment Awards	Popularity Award, Actor in a Comedy/Sitcom	High Kick: Revenge of the Short Legged	Won	
2014	MBC Drama Awards	Golden Acting Award, Actor	Jang Bo-ri Is Here!	Won	
2017	MBC Drama Awards	Golden Acting Award, Actor in a Soap Opera	Golden Pouch	Won	
2017	SBS Drama Awards	Excellence Award, Actor in a Daily/Weekend Drama	Band of Sisters	Won	
