= Kill Me, Heal Me =

2015 South Korean TV series

- Promotional poster
- Hangul: 킬미,힐미
- RR: Kilmi,hilmi
- MR: K'ilmi,hilmi
- Genre: Romantic comedy; Suspense; Medical drama
- Created by: Han Hee
- Written by: Jin Soo-wan
- Directed by: Kim Jin-man; Kim Dae-jin
- Creative directors: Jin Chang-gyoo; Sung Chi-uk; Kwak Seung-yeol
- Starring: Ji Sung; Hwang Jung-eum; Park Seo-joon; Oh Min-suk; Kim Yoo-ri
- Opening theme: Kill Me by Various Artists
- Ending theme: Auditory Hallucinations by Jang Jae-in
- Country of origin: South Korea
- Original language: Korean
- No. of episodes: 20

Production
- Executive producer: Han Hee
- Producer: Kim Hee-yeol
- Running time: 58-63 minutes
- Production companies: Pan Entertainment; Huace Media

Original release
- Network: MBC TV
- Release: January 7 – March 12, 2015

Kill Me, Heal Me (Korean: 킬미, 힐미) is a 2015 South Korean television series starring Ji Sung, Hwang Jung-eum, Park Seo-joon, Oh Min-suk, and Kim Yoo-ri. It aired on MBC from January 7 to March 12, 2015 on Wednesdays and Thursdays at 21:55 (KST) for 20 episodes. The series incorporates dissociative identity disorder and child abuse elements as pivotal topics. It reunited Ji Sung and Hwang Jung-eum, who previously starred together in Secret Love (2013).

== Synopsis ==
The human body is capable of all sorts of things to survive difficult situations. Cha Do-hyun (Ji Sung) is a third-generation business heir who developed dissociative identity disorder (previously known as multiple personality disorder) in the aftermath of several life-threatening traumatic events. He tries to regain control over his life with the help of Oh Ri-jin (Hwang Jung-eum), a beautiful first-year psychiatric resident who helps him secretly. But Ri-jin's twin brother, Oh Ri-on (Park Seo-joon), is a writer who is determined to uncover the unscrupulous lives of the rich and starts following Do-hyun around. Can Do-hyun take control over his condition before one of his seven identities takes control of him instead?

== Cast ==
=== Main ===
- Ji Sung as Cha Do-hyun (Cha Joon-young)
  - Lee Do-hyun as child Cha Do-hyun (Cha Joon-young)

A wealthy businessman with a warmhearted personality who loves to help others. He is the main personality of the body. However, after realizing that he suffers from dissociative identity disorder 11 years ago, he has been desperately trying to hide this fact from his families and friends. In Episode 17, it was revealed that Cha Joon-young is his real name. He has six other identities:

- Shin Se-gi: A vehement young man with a devil-may-care demeanor who appears when Cha Do-hyun experiences violence. He may be violent, but he never hurts children and women. Se-gi endures all of Do-hyun's pain as he is the only identity to have all of Do-hyun's memories. His first love is Oh Ri-jin.

- Ferry Park: A 40-year-old man with an affinity for fishing and building bombs. He appears when Cha Do-hyun reminisces the sweetside of his father before they came back into the mansion. The name "Ferry Park" came from the promise Do-hyun (Joon-young) made to his father, which is to buy a boat named Ferry Park Boat for him. He speaks with a Jeolla dialect.

- Ahn Yo-seob : A suicidal, intelligent 17-year-old boy who is an artist. He first appeared when Cha Do-hyun attempted to commit suicide when he was in high school. He is Yo-na's twin brother.

- Ahn Yo-na : An extrovert and mischievous 17-year-old girl who loves idols. She appears when Cha Do-hyun undergoes a great deal of pain or mental stress, and needs to endure it clandestinely. She has a crush on Oh Ri-on. She is Yo-seob's twin sister.

- Na-na (Cha Do-hyun): A 7-year-old girl who owns a teddy bear named Nana and revealed that her name is Cha Do-hyun. She is the embodiment of Do-hyun's childhood fears as well as Ri-jin's younger self.

- Mr. X: A mysterious man who is later revealed as the father of Na-na.

- Hwang Jung-eum as Oh Ri-jin (Cha Do-hyun)
  - Kim Amy as child Oh Ri-jin (Cha Do-hyun)

Oh Ri-on's twin sister. A first-year psychiatry resident who tries hard to maintain her seemingly perfect image to cover for her real personality. At first glance, she looks beautiful, elegant and gentle, but she is actually messy and short-tempered. Ri-jin then becomes Do-hyun's secret psychiatrist, and slowly falls in love with him. In Episode 16, it was revealed that Cha Do-hyun is her real name, and that she was adopted by Ri-on's parents.

- Park Seo-joon as Oh Ri-on (Omega / Oh Hwi)
  - Kim Ye-jun as child Oh Ri-on

Oh Ri-jin's twin older brother. Ri-on often gets mistaken as a goofball, but he is actually a famous mystery novelist under the pseudonym Omega who investigates about the Seungjin Family. His other name is Oh Hwi which he uses to flirt with girls.

- Oh Min-suk as Cha Ki-joon

President of ID Entertainment, he is Do-hyun's confident and competent cousin. Ki-joon and Do-hyun are rivals, with both competing to inherit their family's company.

- Kim Yoo-ri as Han Chae-yeon

She is Do-hyun's first love and Ki-joon's fiancée, a cold and prideful woman.

=== Supporting ===
- Choi Won-young as Ahn Gook, Do-hyun's Secretary.
- Ko Chang-seok as Suk Ho-pil (Dr. Schofield), Do-hyun's physician and Ri-jin's professor.

Seungjin Family

- Kim Young-ae as Seo Tae-im, Chairwoman of Seungjin Group and Do-hyun's grandmother.
- Shim Hye-jin as Shin Hwa-ran, Do-hyun's birth mother
- Ahn Nae-sang as Cha Joon-pyo, Do-hyun's father
- Kim Il-woo as Cha Young-pyo, President of Seungjin Group and Ki-joon's father.
- Kim Na-woon as Yoon Ja-kyung, Ki-joon's mother
- Myung Se-bin as Min Seo-yeon, Do-hyun's registered mother
- Kim Yong-gun as Cha Gun-ho, First Chairman of Seungjin Group

Family of Ri-jin and Ri-on

- Kim Hee-jung as Ji Soon-young, Ri-jin and Ri-on's mother
- Park Jun-gyu as Oh Dae-oh, Ri-jin and Ri-on's father

Others

- Kim Hyung-bum as Section Chief Choi
- Go On as Alex Kang
- Kim Hyun-joo as Baek Jin-sook, Chae-yeon's mother
- Lee Si-eon as Chief Park Min-jae
- Kang Bong-sung as Doctor Shin Sun-jo
- Jo Chang-geun as Doctor Kang In-gyu
- Choi Hyo-eun as Nurse Joo Mi-ro
- Heo Ji-woong as Omega's editor

=== Special appearances ===
- Yoon Joo as Jennifer
- Jung Eun-pyo as U.S. psychiatrist who was afraid of Do-hyun (Ep. 1)
- Kan Mi-youn as Shin Se-gi's girlfriend in the U.S. (Ep. 1)
- Woo Hyun as Alcohol-dependent, mental patient (Ep. 1)
- Koo Jun-yup as Club Paradise DJ (Ep. 1)
- Kim Seul-gi as Patient Heo Sook-hee (Ep. 1–4)
- Jo Yoon-ho as The biker with leather jacket (Ep. 1–3)
- Seo Yi-ahn as Hong Ji-sun, Do-hyun's arranged date (Ep. 7)
- LU:KUS as Idol group Rocking (Ep. 8)
- Park Seul-gi as The MC (Ep. 8)
- J.One (LU:KUS) as J.I. (Rocking) (Ep. 11–12)
- Ahn Young-mi as Tarot card reader (Ep. 13)
- Kwon Yu-ri as Ahn Yo-na (Ep. 20)

== Casting ==
- Lee Seung-gi was supposed to play the role of Cha Do-hyun, but declined. It was next offered to Hyun Bin, but he also declined.
- Lim Ji-yeon was as well offered to become the female lead of the series but declined.

== Original soundtrack ==
Kill Me, Heal Me: Original Soundtrack

Soundtrack album by Various Artists
- Released: March 5, 2015
- Genres: Pop, K-pop, soundtrack, R&B
- Languages: Korean, English
- Labels: Pan Entertainment; Recording Industry Association of Korea, Inc.

=== Part 1 ===
Released on January 14, 2015
No.	Title	Artist	Length
1.	"Auditory Hallucination" (환청)	Jang Jae-in feat. NaShow	3:29
2.	"Auditory Hallucination" (Inst.)		3:29
Total length:			6:38

=== Part 2 ===
Released on January 28, 2015
No.	Title	Artist	Length
1.	"Healing Love" (치유의 사랑)	Luna and Cho-yi (LU:KUS)	4:11
2.	"Healing Love" (Inst.)		4:11
Total length:			8:22

=== Part 3 ===
Released on February 9, 2015
No.	Title	Artist	Length
1.	"Unspeakable Secret" (말할 수 없는 비밀)	Moon Myung-jin	4:26
2.	"Unspeakable Love" (Inst.)		4:26
Total length:			8:42

=== Part 4 ===
Released on February 12, 2015
No.	Title	Artist	Length
1.	"This Feeling" (이런 기분)	Lee Yoo-rim	3:34
2.	"This Feeling" (Inst.)		3:34
Total length:			7:38

=== Part 5 ===
Released on February 17, 2015
No.	Title	Artist	Length
1.	"Letting you go" (너를 보낸다)	Park Seo-joon	4:07
2.	"Letting you go" (Inst.)		4:07
Total length:			8:14

=== Part 6 ===
Released on March 5, 2015
No.	Title	Artist	Length
1.	"Violet" (제비꽃)	Ji Sung	3:54
2.	"Violet" (Inst.)		3:54
Total length:			7:08

Disc 2:
No.	Title	Artist	Length
1.	"Kill Me"	Various Artists	2:26
2.	"I Am Shin Se-gi"	Various Artists	3:39
3.	"Beyond Recollection"	Various Artists	3:58
4.	"Freak"	Various Artists	2:17
5.	"Childhood"	Various Artists	2:01
6.	"Who Are You?"	Various Artists	2:37
7.	"Driving to the Past"	Various Artists	3:40
8.	"I Am Cha Do-hyun"	Various Artists	2:16
9.	"Heal Me"	Various Artists	2:46

=== Chart performance ===
Title	Year	Peak positions	Remarks	Ref.
Title	Year	KOR	Remarks	Ref.
"Auditory Hallucination"(Jang Jae-in & NaShow)	2015	12	Part 1	
"Healing Love" (Luna & Cho-yi (LU:KUS))	2015	98	Part 2	
"Unspeakable Secret" (Moon Myung Jin)	2015	46	Part 3	
"Letting you go" (Park Seo-joon)	2015	91	Part 5	

== Ratings ==
Ep.	Original broadcast date	Average audience share			
Ep.	Original broadcast date	Nielsen Korea		TNmS	
Ep.	Original broadcast date	Nationwide	Seoul	Nationwide	Seoul
1	January 7, 2015	9.2% (15th)	10.3% (13th)	8.7% (20th)	11.1% (12th)
2	January 8, 2015	8.9% (17th)	9.6% (16th)	8.0% (NR)	11.2% (10th)
3	January 14, 2015	10.3% (14th)	11.2% (8th)	8.5% (NR)	11.3% (9th)
4	January 15, 2015	9.4% (18th)	10.8% (10th)	8.4% (NR)	10.4% (19th)
5	January 21, 2015	9.5% (16th)	10.5% (11th)	8.6% (20th)	11.3% (10th)
6	January 22, 2015	9.9% (14th)	10.9% (10th)	9.2% (17th)	12.3% (8th)
7	January 28, 2015	9.6% (14th)	10.6% (10th)	9.4% (18th)	12.0% (7th)
8	January 29, 2015	11.5% (11th)	12.5% (6th)	9.8% (14th)	12.3% (7th)
9	February 4, 2015	10.5% (12th)	11.3% (9th)	10.2% (16th)	12.5% (6th)
10	February 5, 2015	11.0% (11th)	12.2% (6th)	10.9% (14th)	13.5% (6th)
11	February 11, 2015	10.9% (12th)	12.0% (6th)	11.2% (12th)	14.7% (5th)
12	February 12, 2015	11.4% (9th)	12.3% (7th)	10.2% (14th)	14.1% (6th)
13	February 18, 2015	10.3% (9th)	11.1% (7th)	11.0% (10th)	14.1% (5th)
14	February 19, 2015	9.4% (7th)	9.6% (4th)	10.1% (9th)	13.2% (4th)
15	February 25, 2015	10.5% (9th)	11.3% (8th)	11.2% (10th)	14.6% (6th)
16	February 26, 2015	10.4% (11th)	11.2% (9th)	10.7% (13th)	12.8% (8th)
17	March 4, 2015	11.5% (9th)	12.5% (6th)	12.1% (8th)	15.0% (6th)
18	March 5, 2015	9.8% (15th)	11.0% (8th)	10.6% (10th)	13.0% (7th)
19	March 11, 2015	9.2% (16th)	10.0% (13th)	10.7% (11th)	13.4% (7th)
20	March 12, 2015	9.4% (17th)	10.6% (11th)	10.5% (13th)	13.1% (7th)
Average		10.1%	11.1%	10.0%	12.8%
In this table, the blue numbers represent the lowest ratings and the red numbers represent the highest ratings.; NR denotes that the drama did not rank in the top 20 daily programs on that date.

== Awards and nominations ==
Year	Award	Category	Recipient	Result
2015	51st Baeksang Arts Awards	Best Drama	Kill Me, Heal Me	Nominated
2015	51st Baeksang Arts Awards	Best Director (TV)	Kim Jin-man	Nominated
2015	51st Baeksang Arts Awards	Best Actor (TV)	Ji Sung	Nominated
2015	51st Baeksang Arts Awards	Best Screenplay (TV)	Jin Soo-wan	Nominated
2015	51st Baeksang Arts Awards	Most Popular Actor (TV)	Ji Sung	Nominated
2015	51st Baeksang Arts Awards	Most Popular Actor (TV)	Park Seo-joon	Nominated
2015	51st Baeksang Arts Awards	Most Popular Actress (TV)	Hwang Jung-eum	Nominated
2015	10th Seoul International Drama Awards	Best Actor	Ji Sung	Nominated
2015	10th Seoul International Drama Awards	Excellent Korean Drama	Kill Me, Heal Me	Won
2015	10th Seoul International Drama Awards	Outstanding Korean Actress	Hwang Jung-eum	Won
2015	8th Korea Drama Awards	Grand Prize / Daesang	Ji Sung	Nominated
2015	8th Korea Drama Awards	Best Drama	Kill Me, Heal Me	Nominated
2015	8th Korea Drama Awards	Best Production Director	Kim Jin-man	Nominated
2015	8th Korea Drama Awards	Top Excellence Award, Actress	Hwang Jung-eum	Nominated
2015	8th Korea Drama Awards	Best Original Soundtrack	"Auditory Hallucination" by Jang Jae-in (feat. NaShow)	Won
2015	4th APAN Star Awards	Top Excellence Award, Actor in a Miniseries	Ji Sung	Nominated
2015	4th APAN Star Awards	Excellence Award, Actor in a Miniseries	Park Seo-joon	Nominated
2015	MBC Drama Awards	Grand Prize / Daesang (Determined through fan votes)	Ji Sung	Won
2015	MBC Drama Awards	Grand Prize / Daesang (Determined through fan votes)	Hwang Jung-eum	Nominated
2015	MBC Drama Awards	Drama of the Year	Kill Me, Heal Me (Kim Jin-man)	Won
2015	MBC Drama Awards	PD Choice Award	Hwang Jung-eum	Won
2015	MBC Drama Awards	Top Excellence Award, Actor in a Miniseries	Ji Sung	Won
2015	MBC Drama Awards	Top Excellence Award, Actress in a Miniseries	Hwang Jung-eum	Won
2015	MBC Drama Awards	Excellence Award, Actor in a Miniseries	Park Seo-joon	Won
2015	MBC Drama Awards	Top 10 Stars	Ji Sung	Won
2015	MBC Drama Awards	Top 10 Stars	Hwang Jung-eum	Won
2015	MBC Drama Awards	Top 10 Stars	Park Seo-joon	Won
2015	MBC Drama Awards	Popularity Award, Actor	Ji Sung	Nominated
2015	MBC Drama Awards	Popularity Award, Actor	Park Seo-joon	Won
2015	MBC Drama Awards	Popularity Award, Actress	Hwang Jung-eum	Won
2015	MBC Drama Awards	Best Couple Award	Ji Sung and Hwang Jung-eum	Nominated
2015	MBC Drama Awards	Best Couple Award	Ji Sung and Park Seo-joon	Won
2016	4th Annual DramaFever Awards	Best Actor	Ji Sung	Won
2016	WorldFest-Houston International Film Festival	Best Drama (Platinum Award / TV Series-Dramatic)	Kill Me, Heal Me	Won

== Remake ==
- A Chinese remake titled A Seven-Faced Man aired on Tencent in 2017.
- A Hong Kong remake titled Threesome aired on TVB in 2018.
