= Someone Behind You =

- Theatrical poster
- Hangul: 두 사람이다
- RR: Du saramida
- MR: Tu saramida
- Directed by: Oh Ki-hwan
- Written by: Oh Ki-hwan
- Based on: It's Two People by Kang Kyung-ok
- Produced by: Kim Moo-ryong; Oh Ki-hwan
- Starring: Yoon Jin-seo; Park Ki-woong; Lee Ki-woo
- Cinematography: Kim Yong-heung
- Edited by: Kim Sun-min
- Music by: Kim Jun-seok; Park Jang-sun
- Distributed by: M&FC; Chungeorahm
- Release date: 22 August 2007
- Running time: 84 minutes
- Country: South Korea
- Language: Korean
- Box office: US$1,760,707

Someone Behind You (Korean: 두 사람이다) is a 2007 South Korean psychological horror film written, directed and co-produced by Oh Ki-hwan, based on the manhwa It's Two People by Kang Kyung-ok. In the movie, a young woman tries to escape what seems to be a family curse that is killing members of her family one by one.

It was released in America at the 2009 After Dark Horrorfest film festival with the title Voices.

== Plot ==
Kim Ga-in is a student in South Korea. She and her family come to her aunt Jee-sun's wedding, but before the wedding, Jee-sun is pushed off the balcony and rushed to the hospital. Ga-in waits with her boyfriend, Park Hyun-joong, while her aunt recovers. They then witness Jee-sun's younger sister, Jung-sun, repeatedly stabbing her.

Jung-sun is arrested for Jee-sun's murder and held for questioning. It is revealed that the family believes they are cursed, and at least one member dies in incomprehensible ways. In this case, Jung-sun was possessed and killed Jee-sun. At school, Jung Eun-kyung, the top student, attempts to kill Ga-in with scissors. During the struggle, Eun-kyung is stabbed instead and transfers to another school. That same day, Ga-in is confronted by her teacher, who blames her for Eun-kyung's leaving and tries to kill her. Ga-in is saved by a classmate.

Hong Seok-min, an eccentric student rumored to have killed his own father, advises Ga-in to trust no one, including herself. She visits Jung-sun to ask her about the murder. She tells her that Jee-sun's husband is Jung-sun's ex-boyfriend, and she had required revenge on Jee-sun. She says that an unknown force possessed her and coerced her to kill. That evening, the classmate who had saved her came to have his try at killing her. She runs inside only to find her mother throwing knives at her. Frightened and no longer feeling safe inside her own home, Ga-in tells her father she is leaving. Her father tells her that there is a forgotten family member in another village named Hwang Dae-yong. On the bus, Ga-in meets Seok-min again, and together they visit Dae-yong.

Dae-yong tells them how he killed his wife in a fit of jealousy when he learned of his wife's alleged affair, then tried to find the force that controlled him after being released from jail. After Ga-in and Seok-min return home, Dae-yong commits suicide to stay away from the curse. At school, Ga-in has an apparition of her best friend killing her and realizes that she really cannot trust anyone. One night, she wakes up and finds her parents killed. It is divulged that Hyun-joong is the one who killed her parents. Hyun-joong stabs her as she tries to save her younger sister Ga-yeon, and wants to set the house on fire to turn it into hell. Both sisters stab him and leave him dead as the house begins to burn.

In the hospital, Ga-in and Ga-yeon are placed in the same room. Ga-in is having nightmares and is woken by her sister. Ga-in has a hallucination of Ga-yeon taking a knife from her pocket; they struggle, and the knife ends up stabbing Ga-yeon. Ga-yeon cries and asks Ga-in how she could do this to her own sister. Seok-min appears and exposes his true individuality: the curse. He can only be seen by Ga-in and the people he controls. Ga-in looks down at Ga-yeon and realizes that it was not a knife in her pocket, but instead a burnt family photo. Seok-min then tries to kill Ga-in. Ga-in stabs Seok-min, but in reality, she stabs herself because he is controlling her from the inside.

In the epilogue, a boy is being verbally assaulted by his teacher. After the teacher leaves, Hong Seok-min appears in a new body and asks the boy if he wants help to get back at the teacher.

== Cast ==
- Yoon Jin-seo as Kim Ga-in
- Park Ki-woong as Hong Seok-min
- Lee Ki-woo as Park Hyun-joong
  - Kang Yi-seok as young Hyun-joong
- Kim So-eun as Kim Ga-yeon
- Lee Kan-hee as Ga-in's mother
- Jeong Yu-mi as Lee Myung-hee
- Ahn Nae-sang as Ga-in's homeroom teacher
- Oh Yeon-seo as Jung Eun-kyung
- Jo Yeon-hee as Kim Jee-sun
- Seo Yoo-jung as Kim Jung-sun
- Jeon Guk-hwan as Jee-sun's father
- Kim Min-kyung as Jee-sun's mother
- Ahn Shin-woo as Hong Jae-sun
- Kim Seong-jun as Hwang Dae-yong
- Park Seung-tae as Dae-yong's mother
- Seo Yoon-jae as Kim In-sook
- Jung Wook as Hyun-joong's father
- Baek Joo-hee as Hyun-joong's mother
- Jung In-gi as Detective Jo
- Kim Do-yeon as Kim Mi-joo
- Ham Yu-seon as Lee So-ri
- Lee Geung-young as Ga-in's father
- Yeon Je-wook as Choi Sang-kyung

== Production ==
The filming started in March 30 in Gwangju Gyeonggi province. The filming of the murder scene at the film studio in Namyangju was open to journalists in April. The film completed its filming in June 1 of 2006 in Hongcheon.

== Promotion ==
The promotion team hosted a guerilla event on August 11, 2007, where two people dressed up in school clothes with makeup that looks like blood is running down their faces scared bystanders and rewarded them with fans that had the title of the film written on it. A bus that was wrapped with the film's promotion material also drove through the streets of Seoul on March 8, 2007.

== Reception ==
The film reached number one in pre-release ticket sales in 2007, but the film was a commercial flop. Dread Central reviewed the movie negatively, writing "These Voices need to shut up. Do not bother. You've been warned."
