= Kim Min-jung (actress) =

South Korean actress (born 1982)

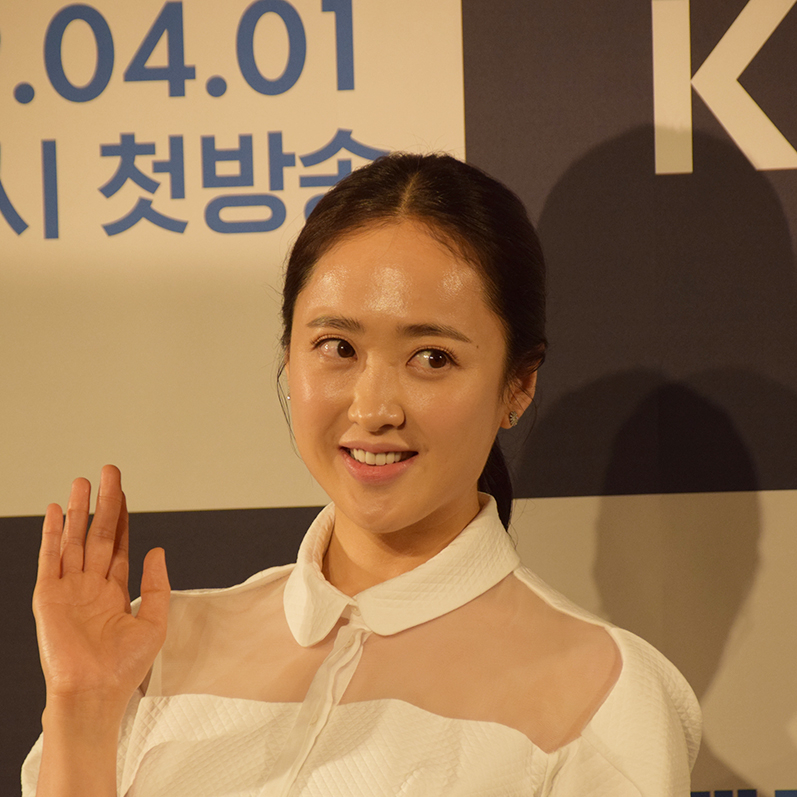
- Kim in April 2019
- Born: July 30, 1982 (age 44); Songpa District, Seoul, South Korea
- Education: Hanyang University – Theater and Film
- Occupation: Actress
- Years active: 1988–present
- Agent: Mynest Company

Korean name
- Hangul: 김민정
- Hanja: 金玟廷
- RR: Gim Minjeong
- MR: Kim Minjŏng

Kim Min-jung (Korean: 김민정; born July 30, 1982) is a South Korean actress.

== Career ==
Kim made her acting debut in 1988, at six years old, in the MBC Best Theater episode Widow. She then starred in numerous television dramas as one of the most in-demand and praised child actresses of her generation. As she grew up, she would become one of a number of Korean child actors who successfully transitioned into adult roles. Kim's more notable TV series include Ireland, Fashion 70's, New Heart, Strike Love, and The Thorn Birds. She has also appeared in films such as Flying Boys, Forbidden Quest, and The Scam. In 2018, Kim was cast in Kim Eun-sook's romance melodrama Mr. Sunshine.

In August 2023, Kim signed with new agency Mynest Company.

== Personal life ==
Kim is Catholic.

== Filmography ==
=== Film ===
Year	Title	Role	Ref.
1989	Samtos and Dori with Braids		
1992	Come Back, Frog Boys		
1993	Kid Cop	Eunsu	
1995	??? ???		
1998	Zzang	Class President	
1998	Whispering Corridors	Chatter	
2002	L'abri: Bus Stop	So-hee	
2003	Project X	Leia	
2004	Flying Boys	Hwangbo Su-jin	
2006	Forbidden Quest	Jeong-bin	
2009	The Scam	Yoo Seo-yeon	
2012	Return of the Family	Kim Hyo-jeong	
2013	Queen of the Night	Hee-joo	

=== Television series ===
Year	Title	Role	Ref.
1988	MBC Best Theater: "Widow"		
1990	Bizarre Family, Bizarre School		
1991	Flower That Never Wilts		
1992	Women's Theater: "Shaking Distance"		
1994	Stranger than Paradise	Yoo Hee-ran	
1995	Adolescence 2		
1995	Jang Nok-su		
1996	Start		
1996	Jo Gwang-jo		
1996	Princess Deok-hye		
1996	Life		
1997	Yesterday		
1997	Wedding Dress		
1997	70-minute Drama: "Isle"		
1997	70-minute Drama: "Baby Blues Parenting Diary"		
1997	70-minute Drama: "Baby Blues Fetal Diary"		
1997	Drama City: "There's Still Time to Love"		
1998	Sunflower		
1998	See and See Again		
1998	The King and the Queen	Queen Jeong-sun	
1998	MBC Best Theater: "A Society That Recommends Laxatives"		
1999	Invitation		
1999	I'm Still Loving You		
1999	KAIST	Kim Min-hee	
1999	Nice Girls		
2000	She's the One		
2000	Medical Center		
2000	The Unstoppables		
2000	Bad Boys		
2001	Mina		
2002	The Thought of Wearing Rubber Shoes Backwards		
2002	Rival	Jung Chae-yeon	
2003	Land of Wine	Sun-hee	
2004	Ireland	Han Si-yeon	
2005	Fashion 70s	Go Joon-hee	
2006	Stranger Than Paradise	Yoo Hee-ram	
2007	New Heart	Nam Hye-seok	
2009	Strike Love	Choi Eom-ji	
2011	The Thorn Birds	Han Yoo-kyeong	
2012	The Third Hospital	Jin Hye-in	
2014	Gap-dong	Oh Maria	
2015	The Merchant: Gaekju 2015	Mae-wol	
2017	Man to Man	Cha Do-ha	
2018	Mr. Sunshine	Kudo Hina / Lee Yang-hwa	
2019	My Fellow Citizens!	Park Hoo-ja	
2021	The Devil Judge	Jeong Seon-ah	
2024	Check-in Hanyang	Seol Mae-hwa	

=== Television shows ===
Year	Title	Role	Notes	Ref.
2002	Music Bank	Co-host		
2012	The Duet	Co-host		
2016	Tasty Road	Co-host	With Yura	
2018	Snail Hotel	Co-host		
2022	Beauty and Booty	Co-host	Season 7	

== Discography ==
=== Soundtrack appearance ===
List of soundtrack appearances, showing year released, selected chart positions, and name of the album
Title	Year	Peak chart positions	Album
Title	Year	KOR Gaon	Album
"From Me to You"	2009	—	Strike Love OST
"—" denotes a recording that did not chart or was not released in that territory

== Awards and nominations ==
Name of the award ceremony, year presented, category, nominee of the award, and the result of the nomination
Award ceremony	Year	Category	Nominee / Work	Result	Ref.
APAN Star Awards	2015	Excellence Award, Actress in a Serial Drama	The Merchant: Gaekju 2015	Won	
APAN Star Awards	2018	Best Supporting Actress	Mr. Sunshine	Won	
Baeksang Arts Awards	2019	Best Supporting Actress – Television	Mr. Sunshine	Nominated	
KBS Drama Awards	1992	Best Young Actress	Kim Min-jung	Won	
KBS Drama Awards	1998	Best Young Actress	Kim Min-jung	Won	
KBS Drama Awards	2015	Excellence Award, Actress in a Mid-length Drama	The Merchant: Gaekju 2015	Won	
Korea Drama Awards	2019	Top Excellence Award, Actress	My Fellow Citizens	Won	
MBC Drama Awards	2004	Best New Actress	Ireland	Won	
MBC Drama Awards	2008	Golden Acting Award, Actress in a Miniseries	New Heart	Won	
Mnet 20's Choice Awards	2008	Female Drama Star	New Heart	Won	
SBS Drama Awards	2002	New Star Award	Rival	Won	
SBS Drama Awards	2005	Top 10 Stars	Fashion 70's	Won	
