= New Heart =

2007 Korean drama television series

- Promotional poster for New Heart
- Genre: Medical drama; Romance
- Created by: Choi Chung-wook (MBC)
- Written by: Hwang Eun-kyung
- Directed by: Park Hong-kyun
- Starring: Ji Sung; Kim Min-jung; Cho Jae-hyun; Lee Ji-hoon
- Country of origin: South Korea
- Original language: Korean
- No. of episodes: 23

Production
- Producer: Lee Jin-Seok
- Running time: 60 minutes
- Production company: JS Pictures

Original release
- Network: Munhwa Broadcasting Corporation
- Release: December 12, 2007 – February 28, 2008

New Heart (Korean: 뉴하트) is a 2007 South Korean television series, starring Ji Sung, Kim Min-jung, Cho Jae-hyun and Lee Ji-hoon. Directed by Park Hong-kyun and written by Hwang Eun-kyung, it aired on MBC from December 12, 2007 to February 28, 2008 on Wednesdays and Thursdays at 21:55 for 23 episodes.

== Synopsis ==
New Heart is a drama about heart surgeons who work in the thoracic surgery department of the fictional Kwanghee University Hospital.

Lee Eun-sung (Ji Sung) graduated from a newly established medical school in the provinces. He applies for a residency program the hospital and has high hopes of becoming a great doctor, despite his poor performance academically. Nam Hye-suk (Kim Min-jung) graduated at top of her medical school and is the first person to achieve perfect scores.

Eun-sung and Hye-suk's characters are opposites. Eun-sung is impulsive and compassionate, but lacks sound medical practice. Hye-suk is calculating and cold, but has a brilliant mind. They both must prove themselves to the new head of the Department of Thoracic and Cardiovascular Surgery, Choi Kang-guk (Cho Jae-hyun). He believes only a very specific kind of person is capable of being a cardiothoracic surgeon. Although he is a medical genius, he is stubborn and refuses to maintain the status quo and abide by hospital policies. Eun-sung and Hye-suk are the only applicants for the cardiothoracic residency positions at Kwanghee University Hospital. Dr. Choi is forced to accept them whilst attempting to restore the reputation of the cardiothoracic department of the hospital.

Famous actor Lee Dong-gwon (Lee Ji-hoon) is admitted into the hospital for cardiac arrhythmia. He immediately falls in love with Hye-suk, who was his classmate from elementary school. A love triangle develops as Dong-gwon becomes jealous when he observes the developing relationship between Eun-sung and Hye-suk.

== Cast ==
=== Main cast ===
- Ji Sung as Lee Eun-sung
- Kim Min-jung as Nam Hye-suk
- Cho Jae-hyun as Choi Kang-gook

=== Supporting cast ===
- Lee Ji-hoon as Lee Dong-kwon
- Jung Ho-keun as Min Young-kyu
- Jang Hyun-sung as Kim Tae-joon
- Sung Dong-il as Lee Seung-jae
- Lee Ki-young as Kim Jung-gil
- Jung Dong-hwan as Park Jae-hyun
- Park Kwang-jung as Kim Young-hee
- Seo Yoo-jung as Ms. Jung
- Park Chul-min as Bae Dae-ro
- Kang Ji-hoo as Woo In-tae
- Shin Dong-mi as Jo Min-ah
- Kim Jun-ho as Seol Rae-hyun
- Jung Kyung-soon as Jo Bok-gil
- Lee Eung-kyung as Kim Hye-sook
- Lee Chang-joo as Lee In-ho
- Son Yeo-eun as Choi Hyun-jung
- Shin Da-eun as Kim Mi-mi

=== Extended cast ===
- Jo Myung-jin as Kim Ji-hyun
- Jung Chan as Heo Tae-jin
- Kim Hye-eun as Yoo Hee-jin
- Yoo Jung-suk as Jae-sub
- Jang Se-yoon as Nurse
- Lee Seol-hee as Nurse
- Jung Yi-do as Min-chul
- Min Ji-oh as Lee Pil-joo
- Jung Yoon-seok as Kim Jung-min
- Kim Yoo-jung as Yoon-ah (guest)
- Eun Ji-won as (guest)
- Ryu Ui-hyun

== Awards and nominations ==
| Year | Award | Category | Recipient | Result |
|---|---|---|---|---|
| 2008 | 44th Baeksang Arts Awards | Best Actor (Television) | Cho Jae-hyun | Nominated |
| 2008 | 44th Baeksang Arts Awards | Best New Director (Television) | Park Hong-kyun | Nominated |
| 2008 | 44th Baeksang Arts Awards | Best Screenplay (Television) | Hwang Eun-kyung | Nominated |
| 2008 | 2nd Korea Drama Awards | Top Excellence Award, Actor | Cho Jae-hyun | Nominated |
| 2008 | 27th MBC Drama Awards | Top Excellence Award, Actor | Cho Jae-hyun | Won |
| 2008 | 27th MBC Drama Awards | Excellence Award, Actor | Ji Sung | Nominated |
| 2008 | 27th MBC Drama Awards | Golden Acting Award, Actor in a Miniseries | Ji Sung | Won |
| 2008 | 27th MBC Drama Awards | Golden Acting Award, Actress in a Miniseries | Kim Min-jung | Won |
| 2008 | 27th MBC Drama Awards | Golden Acting Award, Supporting Actor | Park Chul-min | Won |
| 2008 | 27th MBC Drama Awards | Viewer's Favorite Drama of the Year | New Heart | Nominated |

== International broadcast ==
- It aired in Japan on Fuji TV in 2010 as part of the network's "Hallyu Alpha Summer Festival."
- It aired in Thailand on Channel 7 from October 29, 2010 to December 9, 2010, under the title P̄h̀ā rạk phis̄ūcn̒ h̄ạwcı (ผ่ารัก พิสูจน์หัวใจ).
- It aired in Indonesia on B-Channel from October 9, 2013 to December 27, 2013, under the title Hati Baru.
- The series will be broadcast in 2018 with Persian dubbing from Iran's National Television Channel 2.
