= Baeksang Arts Award for Best Director – Television =

Annual South Korean television award

- Awarded for: Best direction of a South Korean series
- Country: South Korea
- Presented by: Baeksang Arts Awards
- Most recent winner: Park Shin-woo; Our Unwritten Seoul (2026)
- Website: baeksangartsawards

The Baeksang Arts Award for Best Director – Television (Korean: 백상예술대상 TV부문 연출상; RR: Baeksang Yesul Daesang TV Bumun Yeonchulsang) is annually presented at the Baeksang Arts Awards ceremony.

== Winners and nominees ==
Table key
‡	Indicates the winner

=== 1970s ===
Year	Winner and nominees	Television series	Original title	Network
1974 (10th)	Yoo Heung-yeol ‡	Century	한백년	MBC
1975 (11th)	Kim Jae-hyung ‡	Lotus Flower	연화	TBC
1977 (13th)	Lee Hyo-young ‡	Arirang a!	아리랑아	MBC
1978 (14th)	Kim Soo-dong ‡	Kkachiya kkachiya	까치야 까치야	KBS
1979 (15th)	Kim Hong-jong ‡	June 25 Special	6.25	KBS

=== 1980s ===
Year	Winner and nominees	Television series	Original title	Network
1980 (16th)	Shim Hyun-woo ‡	Songs Buried in the Ground	땅에 묻은 노래	TBC
1981 (17th)	Kim Soo-dong ‡	Back in the Day	옛날 나 어릴 적에	KBS1
1982 (18th)	Choi Sang-hyun ‡	Hope	소망	KBS1
1983 (19th)	Hwang Eun-jin ‡	Winds of Change	풍운	KBS1
1984 (20th)	Go Seok-man ‡	Infant	간난이	MBC
1985 (21st)	Kim Jong-hak ‡	Kingdom of Dongto	동토의 왕국	MBC
1986 (22nd)	Kim Hong-jong ‡	Plaza	광장	KBS1
1987 (23rd)	Kim Soo-dong ‡	KBS Drama Game	KBS 드라마게임	KBS2
1988 (24th)	Lee Yoo-hyang ‡	Love Begins	사랑의 시작	KBS2
1989 (25th)	Park Jin-soo ‡	Paramita	바라밀	KBS2

=== 1990s ===
Year	Winner and nominees	Television series	Original title	Network
1990 (26th)	Jang Song-bong ‡	The House with a Deep Yard	마당 깊은 집	MBC
1991 (27th)	Ko Seok-man ‡	The Second Republic	제2공화국	MBC
1992 (28th)	Kim Jong-hak ‡	Eyes of Dawn	여명의 눈동자	MBC
1993 (29th)	Kwak Young-beom ‡	Where Are You Going?	어디로 가나	SBS
1994 (30th)	Park Chul ‡	My Mother's Sea	엄마의 바다	MBC
1995 (31st)	Jang Soo-bong ‡	Kareisky	까레이스키	MBC
1995 (31st)	Kim Jong-hak ‡	Sandglass	모래시계	SBS
1996 (32nd)	Sung Joon-ki ‡	Auntie Ok	옥이 이모	SBS
1996 (32nd)	Kim Chung-gil ‡	Kim Gu	김구	KBS1
1997 (33rd)	Kim Hong-jong ‡	Days on the Street	길 위의 날들	KBS1
1998 (34th)	Lee Jang-soo ‡	Offspring	새끼	SBS
1999 (35th)	Jang Soo-bong ‡	When Time Flows	흐르는 것이 세월뿐이랴	MBC

=== 2000s ===
Year	Winner and nominees	Television series	Original title	Network
2000 (36th)	Lee Sung-yol ‡	Kook-hee	국희	MBC
2001 (37th)	Jang Hyung-il ‡	Virtue	덕이	SBS
2001 (37th)	Yoon Seok-ho	Autumn in My Heart	가을동화	KBS2
2002 (38th)	Yoon Seok-ho ‡	Winter Sonata	겨울연가	KBS2
2002 (38th)	Kim Jae-hyung	A Woman in Heaven	여인천하	SBS
2002 (38th)	Pyo Min-soo	Blue Mist	푸른 안개	KBS2
2003 (39th)	Kim Jong-hak ‡	Great Ambition	대망	SBS
2004 (40th)	Lee Byung-hoon ‡	Jewel in the Palace	대장금	MBC
2004 (40th)	Kim Jong-chang	Yellow Handkerchief	노란 손수건	KBS1
2004 (40th)	Choi Moon-suk	Something Happened in Bali	발리에서 생긴 일	SBS
2005 (41st)	Lee Sung-joo ‡	Immortal Admiral Yi Sun-sin	불멸의 이순신	KBS1
2005 (41st)	Lee Hyung-min	I'm Sorry, I Love You	미안하다, 사랑한다	KBS
2005 (41st)	Shin Woo-chul	Lovers in Paris	파리의 연인	SBS
2006 (42nd)	Kim Jong-chang ‡	My Rosy Life	장밋빛 인생	KBS2
2006 (42nd)	Kim Yoon-cheol	My Name Is Kim Sam-soon	내 이름은 김삼순	MBC
2006 (42nd)	Lee Jong-han	Land	토지	SBS
2007 (43rd)	Ahn Pan-seok ‡	Behind the White Tower	하얀 거탑	MBC
2007 (43rd)	Han Ji-seung	Alone in Love	연애시대	SBS
2007 (43rd)	Kim Chul-kyu	Hwang Jini	황진이	KBS2
2007 (43rd)	Lee Joo-hwan	Jumong	주몽	MBC
2007 (43rd)	Yoon Chang-beom	Seoul 1945	서울 1945	KBS1
2008 (44th)	Lee Byung-hoon ‡	Yi San	이산	MBC
2008 (44th)	Jang Tae-yoo	War of Money	쩐의 전쟁	SBS
2008 (44th)	Lee Duk-gun	Likeable or Not	미우나 고우나	KBS1
2008 (44th)	Woon Goon-il	Golden Bride	황금신부	SBS
2008 (44th)	Yoo Chul-yong	H.I.T	히트	MBC
2009 (45th)	Shin Woo-chul ‡	On Air	온 에어	SBS
2009 (45th)	Choi Jong-soo	Gourmet	식객	SBS
2009 (45th)	Jung Eul-young	Mom's Dead Upset	엄마가 뿔났다	KBS2
2009 (45th)	Lee Jae-gyu	Beethoven Virus	베토벤 바이러스	MBC
2009 (45th)	Lee Tae-gon	Last Scandal	내 생애 마지막 스캔들	MBC

=== 2010s ===
Year	Winner and nominees	Television series	Original title	Network
2010 (46th)	Go Dong-sun ‡	Queen of Housewives	내조의 여왕	MBC
2010 (46th)	Hong Sung-chang	You're Beautiful	미남이시네요	SBS
2010 (46th)	Kim Byeong-wook, Kim Chang-dong, Kim Young-ki	High Kick Through the Roof	지붕 뚫고 하이킥	MBC
2010 (46th)	Park Hong-gyun, Kim Geun-hong	Queen Seondeok	선덕여왕	MBC
2010 (46th)	Yang Yun-ho, Kim Kyu-tae	Iris	아이리스	KBS2
2011 (47th)	Lee Jung-sub ‡	Bread, Love and Dreams	제빵왕 김탁구	KBS2
2011 (47th)	Jung Eul-young	Life Is Beautiful	인생은 아름다워	SBS
2011 (47th)	Lee Byung-hoon	Dong Yi	동이	MBC
2011 (47th)	Shin Woo-chul	Secret Garden	시크릿 가든	SBS
2011 (47th)	Yoo In-shik	Giant	자이언트	SBS
2012 (48th)	Kim Jung-min, Park Hyun-suk ‡	The Princess' Man	공주의 남자	KBS2
2012 (48th)	Jang Tae-yoo	Deep Rooted Tree	뿌리 깊은 나무	SBS
2012 (48th)	Kim Do-hoon, Lee Sung-jun	Moon Embracing the Sun	해를 품은 달	MBC
2012 (48th)	Noh Do-chul	Twinkle Twinkle	반짝반짝 빛나는	MBC
2012 (48th)	Yoo Hyun-ki, Song Hyun-wook	Brain	브레인	KBS2
2013 (49th)	Kim Kyu-tae ‡	That Winter, the Wind Blows	그 겨울, 바람이 분다	SBS
2013 (49th)	Jo Nam-kook	The Chaser	추적자	SBS
2013 (49th)	Kim Hyung-suk	My Husband Got a Family	넝쿨째 굴러온 당신	KBS2
2013 (49th)	Kwon Seok-jang, Lee Yoon-jung	Golden Time	골든타임	MBC
2013 (49th)	Lee Joo-hwan	Lights and Shadows	빛과 그림자	MBC
2014 (50th)	Ahn Pan-seok ‡	Secret Love Affair	밀회	JTBC
2014 (50th)	Jang Tae-yoo	My Love from the Star	별에서 온 그대	SBS
2014 (50th)	Jo Soo-won	I Can Hear Your Voice	너의 목소리가 들려	SBS
2014 (50th)	Ki Min-soo	Good Doctor	굿 닥터	KBS2
2014 (50th)	Shin Won-ho	Reply 1994	응답하라 1994	tvN
2015 (51st)	Kim Won-seok ‡	Misaeng: Incomplete Life	미생 - 아직 살아 있지 못한 자	tvN
2015 (51st)	Ahn Pan-seok	Heard It Through the Grapevine	풍문으로 들었소	SBS
2015 (51st)	Kim Jin-man	Kill Me, Heal Me	킬미, 힐미	MBC
2015 (51st)	Kim Jung-min	Bad Guys	나쁜 녀석들	OCN
2015 (51st)	Kim Sang-hyup	Mama	마마	MBC
2016 (52nd)	Shin Won-ho ‡	Reply 1988	응답하라 1988	tvN
2016 (52nd)	Jung Dae-yoon	She Was Pretty	그녀는 예뻤다	MBC
2016 (52nd)	Kim Won-seok	Signal	시그널	tvN
2016 (52nd)	Lee Eung-bok, Baek Sang-hoon	Descendants of the Sun	태양의 후예	KBS2
2016 (52nd)	Shin Kyung-soo	Six Flying Dragons	육룡이 나르샤	SBS
2017 (53rd)	Yoo In-shik ‡	Dr. Romantic	낭만닥터 김사부	SBS
2017 (53rd)	Song Hyun-wook	Another Miss Oh	또! 오해영	tvN
2017 (53rd)	Lee Eung-bok	Guardian: The Lonely and Great God	쓸쓸하고 찬란하神 – 도깨비	tvN
2017 (53rd)	Jung Dae-yoon	W - Two Worlds	더블유	MBC
2017 (53rd)	Hong Jong-chan	Dear My Friends	디어 마이 프렌즈	tvN
2018 (54th)	Kim Yoon-chul ‡	The Lady in Dignity	품위있는 그녀	JTBC
2018 (54th)	Kim Cheol-kyu	Mother	마더	tvN
2018 (54th)	Mo Wan-il	Misty	미스티	JTBC
2018 (54th)	Shin Won-ho	Prison Playbook	슬기로운 감빵생활	tvN
2018 (54th)	Ahn Gil-ho	Stranger	비밀의 숲	tvN
2019 (55th)	Jo Hyun-tak ‡	Sky Castle	SKY 캐슬	JTBC
2019 (55th)	Kim Suk-yoon	The Light in Your Eyes	눈이 부시게	JTBC
2019 (55th)	Kim Won-seok	My Mister	나의 아저씨	tvN
2019 (55th)	Ahn Gil-ho	Memories of the Alhambra	알함브라 궁전의 추억	tvN
2019 (55th)	Lee Eung-bok	Mr. Sunshine	미스터 션샤인	tvN

=== 2020s ===
Year	Winner and nominees	Television series	Original title	Network
2020 (56th)	Mo Wan-il ‡	The World of the Married	부부의 세계	JTBC
2020 (56th)	Kim Seong-yoon	Itaewon Class	이태원 클라쓰	JTBC
2020 (56th)	Lee Jung-hyo	Crash Landing on You	사랑의 불시착	tvN
2020 (56th)	Cha Yeong-hoon	When the Camellia Blooms	동백꽃 필 무렵	KBS2
2020 (56th)	Jeong Dong-yoon	Hot Stove League	스토브리그	SBS
2021 (57th)	Kim Cheol-kyu ‡	Flower of Evil	악의 꽃	tvN
2021 (57th)	Kwon Young-il	My Unfamiliar Family	(아는 건 별로 없지만) 가족입니다	tvN
2021 (57th)	Kim Hee-won	Vincenzo	빈센조	tvN
2021 (57th)	Park Shin-woo	It's Okay to Not Be Okay	사이코지만 괜찮아	tvN
2021 (57th)	Shim Na-yeon	Beyond Evil	괴물	JTBC
2022 (58th)	Hwang Dong-hyuk ‡	Squid Game	오징어 게임	Netflix
2022 (58th)	Yoon Sung-ho	Political Fever	이렇게 된 이상 청와대로 간다	Wavve
2022 (58th)	Lee Na-jung	Mine	마인	tvN
2022 (58th)	Jung Ji-in	The Red Sleeve	옷소매 붉은 끝동	MBC
2022 (58th)	Han Jun-hee	D.P.	D.P.	Netflix
2023 (59th)	Yoo In-shik ‡	Extraordinary Attorney Woo	이상한 변호사 우영우	ENA
2023 (59th)	Kim Kyu-tae	Our Blues	우리들의 블루스	tvN
2023 (59th)	Kim Seok-yoon	My Liberation Notes	나의 해방일지	JTBC
2023 (59th)	Kim Hee-won	Little Women	작은 아씨들	tvN
2023 (59th)	Lee Joo-young	Anna	안나	Coupang
2024 (60th)	Han Dong-wook ‡	The Worst of Evil	최악의 악	Disney+
2024 (60th)	Park In-je	Moving	무비	Disney+
2024 (60th)	Lee Myoungwoo	Boyhood	소년시대	Coupang
2024 (60th)	Lee Chang-hee	A Killer Paradox	살인자ㅇ난감	Netflix
2024 (60th)	Jung Ji-hyun	Lies Hidden in My Garden	마당이 있는 집	ENA
2025 (61st)	Song Yeon-hwa ‡	Doubt	이토록 친밀한 배신자	MBC
2025 (61st)	Kim Won-seok	When Life Gives You Tangerines	폭싹 속았수다	Netflix
2025 (61st)	Kim Hee-won	Light Shop	조명가게	Disney+
2025 (61st)	Lee Do-yoon	The Trauma Code: Heroes on Call	중증외상센터	Netflix
2025 (61st)	Jung Ji-in	Jeongnyeon: The Star Is Born	정년이	tvN
2026 (62nd)	Park Shin-woo ‡	Our Unwritten Seoul	미지의 서울	tvN
2026 (62nd)	Woo Min-ho	Made in Korea	메이드 인 코리아	Disney+
2026 (62nd)	Yoo Young-eun	Can This Love Be Translated?	이 사랑 통역 되나요?	Netflix
2026 (62nd)	Jo Young-min	You and Everything Else	은중과 상연	Netflix
2026 (62nd)	Cho Hyun-tak	The Dream Life of Mr. Kim	서울 자가에 대기업 다니는 김 부장 이야기	JTBC

== Sources ==
- "Baeksang Arts Awards Nominees and Winners Lists". Naver Movie (in Korean).
- "Baeksang Arts Awards Winners Lists". Baeksang Arts Awards (in Korean).
