= Jang So-yeon =

South Korean actress (born 1980)

- Born: Seo Eun-jung; 28 January 1980 (age 46); Sinsa-dong, Gangnam, Seoul, South Korea
- Education: Sookmyung Women's University – Department of English and Chinese
- Occupations: Actress; theater actor
- Years active: 2001–present
- Agent: Clover Company
- Awards: Best Supporting Actress award at 6th APAN Star Awards in 2018

Korean name
- Hangul: 장소연
- Hanja: 張少妍
- RR: Jang Soyeon
- MR: Chang Soyŏn

Jang So-yeon (Korean: 장소연; born Seo Eun-jung on 28 January 1980) is a South Korean actress. She is alumni of Sookmyung Women's University, Department of English and Chinese. She made her acting debut in 2001, since then, she has appeared in number of plays, films and television series. She is known for her roles in My Father Is Strange (2017), Something in the Rain (2018) and Crash Landing on You (2019). She has acted in films such as: Veteran (2015) and Peninsula (2020) among others.

== Career ==
Jang So-yeon is a graduate in English and Chinese from Sookmyung Women's University. She is a member of the theater company 'Yeonwoo Stage'. She has appeared in My Lawyer, Mr. Jo (2016), While You Were Sleeping (2017), The Secret Life of My Secretary (2019), and Welcome 2 Life (2019).

In 2018, she appeared in JTBC's TV series Something in the Rain as Seo Kyung-seon, for her performance she won the best supporting actress award at 6th APAN Star Awards.

In 2019–20, she played Hyun Myeong-sun, a North Korean housewife in tvN's romantic drama Crash Landing on You, which is the third highest-rated South Korean TV drama in cable television history. Jang's performance was appreciated as she pulled off the role with her natural North Korean dialect.

In 2021, Jang was appreciated for her performance as Kang Mi-ra, a mother who had a child abducted 11 years ago, in JTBC Drama festa Missing Child.

In 2022, Jang is appearing in JTBC's office romantic drama Forecasting Love and Weather and cast in Disney+ Sci-fi thriller Grid as Choi Seon-ul, the deputy director of the secretariat for 25 years. In September, Jang signed an exclusive contract with Clover Company.

== Filmography ==
=== Films ===
Year	Title	Role	Notes	Ref.
2001	Take Care of My Cat			
2002	Desire	Soyeon		
2005	Red Eye	Joo-mi		
2006	Over the Border			
2006	Seducing Mr. Perfect			
2007	Unstoppable Marriage			
2007	Going by the Book	Reporter 2		
2008	Crossing	North Korean defector 3, woman		
2008	My Dear Enemy	Eun-jeong		
2009	Castaway on the Moon	Seong-geun's girlfriend		
2009	19-Nineteen	Yoo Eun-hye		
2010	Wedding Dress			
2010	The Yellow Sea	Employee at Do-man Hotel		
2011	Silenced	courtroom sign language interpreter		
2014	Another Promise			
2014	My Dictator	Sanatorium nurse		
2015	Gangnam Blues	Banquet hall beauties		
2015	Veteran	Driver Bae's wife		
2016	The Wailing	Jong-goo's wife		
2018	High Society	Prosecutor Jo Yeong-seon		
2018	The Soup	Ae-shim		
2019	Crazy Romance	Mi-yeong		
2020	Peninsula	Jung-seok's elder sister		

=== Television series ===
Year	Title	Role	Notes	Ref.
2007	Behind the White Tower	Yoo Mi-ra		
2009	Queen Seondeok			
2010	Dong Yi	Geum-hong		
2010	KBS Drama Special: "Flashman"	Dong-cheol	Season 1, Episode 13	
2011	Special Affairs Team TEN	Im Yoo-kyeong		
2012	How Long I've Kissed	Yoon Mi-rae		
2014	Secret Affair	Ahn Se-jin		
2015	Heard It Through the Grapevine	Min Joo-young		
2015	The Village: Achiara's Secret	Kang Joo-hee		
2016	My Lawyer, Mr. Jo	Choi Ah-rim		
2016	Entourage	Jo Tae-young		
2017	My Father Is Strange	Lee Bo-mi		
2017	While You Were Sleeping	Do Geum-sook		
2018	Goodbye to Goodbye	Jeong Hyo's mother	Special appearance	
2018	Something in the Rain	Seo Kyung-seon	Best supporting actress award	
2018	Heart Surgeons	Kang Eun-sook		
2019	Touch Your Heart	Yang Eun-ji		
2019	The Secret Life of My Secretary	Lee Eul-wang		
2019	Welcome 2 Life	Bang Young-suk		
2019-20	Crash Landing on You	Hyun Myeong-sun		
2020	The Game: Towards Zero	Yoo Ji-won		
2021	Drama Festa: "Missing Child"	Kang Mi-ra		
2022	Forecasting Love and Weather	Lee Hyang-rae		
2022	Grid	Choi Sun-wool		
2023	Divorce Attorney Shin	Ji-eun	Special appearance	
2024	The Midnight Romance in Hagwon	Choi Ji-eun		

== Theater ==
Year	Title	Role	Ref.
2014	Red Island - Copper	Hongdo	
2017	Lapartite	Mauriel	

== Awards and nominations ==
Name of the award ceremony, year presented, category, nominee of the award, and the result of the nomination
Award ceremony	Year	Category	Work	Result	Ref.
SBS Drama Awards	2015	Special Award, Actress in a Miniseries	The Village: Achiara's Secret	Nominated	
APAN Star Awards	2018	Best Supporting Actress	Something in the Rain	Won	
MBC Drama Awards	2019	Excellence Award, Actress in a Monday-Tuesday Miniseries	Welcome 2 Life	Nominated	
