= One Spring Night =

2019 South Korean television series

- Promotional poster
- Hangul: 봄밤
- Lit.: Spring Night
- RR: Bombam
- MR: Pompam
- Genre: Romance; Drama
- Written by: Kim Eunsang
- Directed by: Ahn Pan-seok
- Starring: Han Ji-min; Jung Hae-in
- Music by: Lee Nam-yoon
- Country of origin: South Korea
- Original language: Korean
- No. of episodes: 32 (Note: In order to circumvent Korean laws that prevent commercial breaks in the middle of an episode, what would previously have been aired as single 70 minute episodes are now being repackaged as two 35 minute episodes, with two episodes being shown each night with a commercial break between the two.)

Production
- Camera setup: Single-camera
- Running time: 35 minutes
- Production company: JS Pictures

Original release
- Network: MBC TV
- Release: May 22 – July 11, 2019

One Spring Night (Korean: 봄밤) is a 2019 South Korean television series starring Han Ji-min and Jung Hae-in. It aired from May 22 to July 11, 2019, and is the first weekday miniseries to be aired by MBC on an earlier timeslot of Wednesdays and Thursdays at 20:55 KST.

== Synopsis ==
Lee Jeong-in (Han Ji-Min) is a librarian who has been in a relationship with a banker, Kwon Gi-seok (Kim Jun-han) for 4 years. Yoo Ji-ho (Jung Hae-in) is a pharmacist, and a single dad. He has graduated a year later than Kwon Gi-seok from the same university. Little do they realize after meeting each other, Ji-ho and Jeong-in will begin to see love and relationships in a whole new light.

Jeong-in meets Ji-ho at the Woori Pharmacy when she goes to buy remedies for her hangover. She tells him she is in a rush, but then realizes she has forgotten her wallet because she left it at her friend's place, where she stayed the previous night. He gives her the remedies and tells her she can pay him back later, and he also gives her money for a taxi to go home.

Ji-ho immediately becomes interested in Jeong-in after their first meeting, and does not respond to her texts intentionally so she has to pay him back in person instead of paying him back in EFT. When she finally revisits the pharmacy, he implies his interest in her to which she responds she can only be friends with him. She tells Ji-ho she is in a relationship. She gets annoyed at Gi-seok and nitpicks everytime. Ji-ho hesitantly admits he is a single parent with a son from a previous relationship. (Single parenthood in South Korea is still frowned upon even though some attitudes about the subject are changing to be more positive.) As a young single parent, Ji-ho has to face this social stigma from almost everyone throughout the episodes. Strangers, Jeong-in's parents, and his friends look down on him due to his parental state. Jeong-in is the only person who doesn't seem to mind.

Parents of Jeong-in and Gi-seok have been pressuring them to get married, but Jeong-in doesn't feel like she is ready since she's unsure if she loves Gi-seok. After meeting Ji-ho, Jeong-in starts having doubts about marrying Gi-seok.

Ji-ho and Jeong-in realize how difficult it would be to have a relationship with each other, so they intend to leave it be. However, tension builds between the two as Ji-ho cannot deny his feelings for Jeong-in and Jeong-in struggles to suppress her feelings for Ji-ho. There are many times where she calls him and wants to meet with him for no apparent reason. After some time, she decides to follow her heart. Both Ji-ho and Jeong-in have to make uncomfortable decisions, and the road for them is never easy as they prove to their parents and friends the sincerity of their feelings.

As a subplot running throughout is the relationship of Jeong-in's sister with her husband, who is abusive and violent, and, though they are effectively separated, will not let her divorce him and threatens her when she brings it up. This marriage was arranged by the parents.

== Cast ==
=== Main ===
- Han Ji-min as Lee Jeong-in, a librarian.
- Jung Hae-in as Yoo Ji-ho, a pharmacist.
- Kim Jun-han as Kwon Gi-seok, a banker.

=== Supporting ===
==== People around Lee Jeong-in ====
- Im Sung-eon as Lee Seo-in, Jeong-in's eldest sister who is a broadcasting announcer.
- Joo Min-kyung as Lee Jae-in, Jeong-in's youngest sister who is a university student.
- Song Seung-hwan as Lee Tae-hak, Jeong-in's father who is the principal of Soo Young High School.
- Gil Hae-yeon as Shin Hyung-seon, Jeong-in's mother who is a housewife.
- Lee Sang-hee as Song Yeong-joo, Jeong-in's colleague at the library and friend.
- Yoon Seul as Oh Ha-rin, Jeong-in's colleague at the library.
- Lee Moo-saeng as Nam Si-hoon, Seo-in's husband who is a dentist.

==== People around Yoo Ji-ho ====
- Oh Man-suk as Yoo Nam-soo, Ji-ho's father who is the co-owner of a laundrette.
- Kim Jung-young as Go Sook-hee, Ji-ho's mother who is the co-owner of a laundrette.
- Ha Yi-an as Yoo Eun-u, Ji-ho's son.
- Seo Jeong-yeon as Wang Hye-jung, Ji-ho's colleague and friend.
- Lee Yoo-jin as Lee Ye-seul, Ji-ho's colleague and a part-time student.
- Lim Hyun-soo as Choi Hyun-soo, Ji-ho's friend who is a bank clerk.
- Lee Chang-hoon as Park Yeong-jae, Ji-ho's best friend who is a student.

==== People around Kwon Gi-seok ====
- Kim Chang-wan as Kwon Young-kook, Gi-seok's father.
- Lee Ji-hyun as Lawyer.

== Production ==
- The lead female role was first offered to Son Ye-jin, who starred alongside Jung Hae-in in the 2018 hit television series Something in the Rain, but she declined.
- It is the second collaboration between actor Jung Hae-in, writer Kim Eun and director Ahn Pan-seok.

== Original soundtrack ==
One Spring Night OST

Soundtrack album by Various artists
- Genre: Soundtrack
- Languages: Korean, English

No.	Title	Writer(s)	Artist	Length
1.	"No Direction"		Rachael Yamagata	3:54
2.	"Spring Rain"		Oscar Dunbar	4:19
3.	"Is It You"		Rachael Yamagata	4:33
4.	"We Could Still Be Happy"		Rachael Yamagata	4:39
5.	"Spring Waltz"	Namyeon Lee, Rachael Yamagata	Carla Bruni	4:16

== Viewership ==
One Spring Night : South Korea viewers per episode (millions)

Episodes	Episode number															
Episodes	1	2	3	4	5	6	7	8	9	10	11	12	13	14	15	16
1–16	N/A	1.039	N/A	0.981	N/A	1.099	0.836	1.199	N/A	1.015	1.208	1.540	0.864	1.180	0.870	1.170
17–32	0.891	1.339	0.986	1.252	0.896	1.206	0.895	1.208	0.883	1.229	0.973	1.288	N/A	1.277	1.171	1.508

Source: Audience measurement performed nationwide by Nielsen Media Research.

Ep.	Original broadcast date	Average audience share		
Ep.	Original broadcast date	AGB Nielsen		TNmS
Ep.	Original broadcast date	Nationwide	Seoul	Nationwide
1	May 22, 2019	3.9% (NR)	4.6% (NR)	4.1%
2	May 22, 2019	6.0% (13th)	7.0% (10th)	6.2%
3	May 23, 2019	3.6% (NR)	4.3% (NR)	4.5%
4	May 23, 2019	5.6% (16th)	6.3% (12th)	6.1%
5	May 29, 2019	4.0% (NR)	—N/a	4.2%
6	May 29, 2019	6.1% (13th)	7.1% (10th)	5.9%
7	May 30, 2019	4.4% (NR)	—N/a	4.4%
8	May 30, 2019	6.4% (16th)	7.4% (9th)	5.8%
9	June 5, 2019	4.5% (NR)	5.5% (17th)	—N/a
10	June 5, 2019	6.5% (12th)	7.9% (7th)	5.9%
11	June 6, 2019	6.8% (13th)	8.0% (9th)	5.9%
12	June 6, 2019	8.4% (8th)	9.8% (4th)	7.3%
13	June 12, 2019	5.1% (NR)	5.5% (20th)	4.1%
14	June 12, 2019	7.0% (10th)	7.7% (7th)	5.9%
15	June 13, 2019	5.4% (18th)	5.8% (13th)	6.0%
16	June 13, 2019	7.0% (11th)	7.6% (9th)	7.1%
17	June 19, 2019	5.0% (NR)	5.9% (17th)	5.4%
18	June 19, 2019	8.1% (6th)	9.4% (4th)	7.7%
19	June 20, 2019	6.1% (14th)	7.3% (11th)	5.6%
20	June 20, 2019	7.7% (7th)	8.9% (5th)	7.6%
21	June 26, 2019	6% (17th)	6.7% (14th)	5.8%
22	June 26, 2019	7.9% (7th)	8.9% (5th)	7.8%
23	June 27, 2019	6.0% (14th)	6.7% (12th)	6.0%
24	June 27, 2019	8.0% (8th)	8.9% (6th)	7.3%
25	July 3, 2019	5.5% (17th)	6.4% (12th)	—N/a
26	July 3, 2019	7.8% (6th)	9.2% (4th)	7.1%
27	July 4, 2019	6.0% (14th)	6.9% (9th)	5.1%
28	July 4, 2019	7.9% (6th)	9.0% (5th)	6.9%
29	July 10, 2019	6.2% (18th)	7.7% (9th)	5.8%
30	July 10, 2019	8.0% (7th)	9.5% (3rd)	7.4%
31	July 11, 2019	7.4% (8th)	8.7% (8th)	6.0%
32	July 11, 2019	9.5% (6th)	10.8% (2nd)	7.5%
Average		6.4%	— (Note: Due to some ratings not recorded, the exact average rating is unknown.)	—
