= Gil Hae-yeon =

South Korean actress (born 1964)

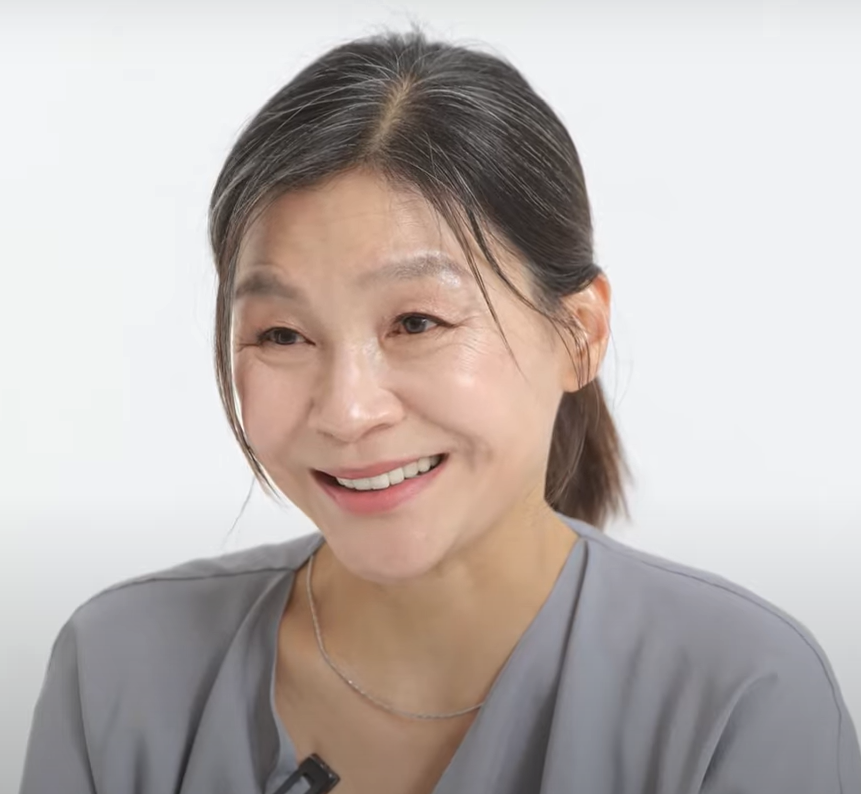
- Gil in March 2022
- Born: April 11, 1964 (age 62); South Korea
- Education: Dongduk Women's University – Korean Language and Literature
- Occupation: Actress
- Years active: 1985–present
- Agent: Just Entertainment

Korean name
- Hangul: 길해연
- Hanja: 吉海蓮
- RR: Gil Haeyeon
- MR: Kil Haeyŏn

Gil Hae-yeon (Korean: 길해연; born April 11, 1964) is a South Korean actress. She is best known to North American audiences for her performance in the film In Her Place, for which she garnered a Canadian Screen Award nomination for Best Supporting Actress at the 3rd Canadian Screen Awards in 2015 and won the Wildflower Film Award for Best Supporting Actress at the 3rd Wildflower Film Awards in 2016.

In South Korea, her roles have included the television series Goodbye Mr. Black, Working Mom Parenting Daddy, Possessed, Something in the Rain, One Spring Night, Encounter (2018–19), and Woman of 9.9 Billion. She is most active as a supporting actress, playing role of main characters' mothers.

Gil also writes children's plays and children's books. She has written over 10 children's books and children's play scripts. She also wrote 'Intensive for Children' based on her experience teaching children in a children's theater class.

In 2020, Gil took office as third Chairman of The Korea Theater Welfare Foundation which was established in 2005 to support theater practitioners so that they do not give up theater even in difficult circumstances and are guaranteed basic treatment. The first Chairman Park Jeong-ja and the second Chairman Yoon Seok-hwa.

== Early life and education ==
Gil Hae-yeon was born in Paju, Gyeonggi Province on April 11, 1964 and raised in Seoul. She showed her writing talent from a young age and won many awards in elementary school. She attended Pungmoon Girls' High School, where she took literature class because of her dream of becoming a writer. During high school, she watched Jean-Paul Sartre's play The Dead without burial, that elevated her awareness of the charm of theatre. Still, She never dreamed of acting.

In 1983, She enrolled in the Korean Literature Department at Dongduk Women's University. When she was a freshman, she chose bowling for her physical education class. She also joined a theater club. Her senior in the theater class asked her to come.

== Career ==
In 1986, during her fourth year of college, she co-founded the theater company 'Little Shinhwa' with friends from around ten university drama clubs, including Sogang University, Chung-Ang University, and Kookmin University. It marked the beginning of her career in theater. They created a theater company with the idea of just doing it for 10 years.

The theater company's motto is "With the Heart of Sprinkling a Lantern of Water in the Desert!". Gil serves as the vice president of 'Little Shinhwa.' One notable work by 'Little Shinhwa' is the play 'New Year's Day,' which premiered at the Dongsung Arts Center in 2001. 'New Year's Day' achieved significant recognition, winning the 10th Daesan Literary Award in the play category upon its premiere. It was also selected as one of the BEST3 plays by the Korea Theater Critics Association in 2001 and received the Best Picture, Best Directing (Choi Yong-hoon), and Acting Award (Hong Seong-kyung) at the 2002 Donga Theater Awards.

After graduating, she also became an acting lecturer. Since the early 1990s, she has been working with children through children's theater classes.

She made her film debut in 2003 with the film If You Were Me.

She was featured as DongA Theatre Princess of the Month in December 2010. The 47th Donga Theater Awards took place on January 24, 2011, at the Grand Theater of Daehakro Arts Theater in Daehakro, Seoul. Actress Gil Hae-yeon, known for her role in "Here Comes Love" (written by Bae Bong-gi and directed by Shim Jae-chan), received the acting award at the ceremony.

In 2011, Gil Hae-yeon was honored with the 'Theater of the Year Award' at the '16th Hiseo Theater Awards'. The awards ceremony took place on December 30 on the 3rd floor of Arko Arts Theater. This year, Gil Hae-yeon appeared in encore such as "Here Comes Love", 'Dream within a Dream', and 'New Year's Day', and was praised for creating a deeper character than when she first performed.

She made her TV debut in 2012 through director Ahn Pan-seok's series How Long I've Kissed. In the series, she portrayed the character Ha Seom-jin, a Korean-Chinese domestic helper. Her realistic acting in the role received praise, as she convincingly portrayed a native Yanbian. After that, her collaboration with Director Ahn continued. In the following years, she worked on one drama each year, including "The End of the World," "Secret Affair," and "Heard It Through the Grapevine.

In 2013, She joins forces with Lee Ho-jae and Kim Young-pil (Theater Company Alleyway) in the Strindberg's play Creditors. which commences on the 10th at the small theater of Arko Arts Theater in Daehakro. The Creditors is a poignant work reflecting the writer's personal experience of an unhappy marriage and his misogynistic beliefs. This tragicomedy follows Gustav (portrayed by Lee Ho-jae), a scholarly ex-husband who seeks revenge against his unfaithful wife, Thekla, and her new husband, the painter Adolf (played by Kim Young-pil), employing his cunning wit and eloquence. The play has been translated by Seong Su-jeong and embellished by Dong Lee-hyang.

Gil made her mark in 2015 when she appeared in director Ahn Pan-seok's drama Heard It Through the Grapevine. Her role as Yang Jae-hwa, the secretary to Han Jeong-ho (played by Yoo Jun-sang), resonated with viewers and left a lasting impression.

She left a deep impression by portraying the roles of Son Ye-jin and Han Ji-min's mother in director Ahn Pan-seok's dramas "Something in the Rain" and "Spring Night," respectively. In "Something in the Rain," she portrayed a snobbish and obnoxious villain, while in "Spring Night," she exhibited respect for her daughters' decisions, showcasing a contrasting character portrayal.

In 2023, Gil was cast in director Bae Doo-ri's independent film "Dolphin" alongside Kwon Yuri. Since its premiere at the Jeonju International Film Festival, the film has garnered attention as it was invited to prominent domestic and international film festivals, including the Seoul Independent Film Festival, the Muju Mountain Film Festival, and the Vancouver Asian Film Festival in Canada.

== Personal life ==
Gil married Cho Won-ho, a fellow founding member of the theater group Little Shinhwa, and they had a son. Gil's husband suddenly died in 2007 due to a myocardial infarction. She became a single mother to her son, who was still in middle school and dealing with an illness. She remained busy with five or six theater appearances, working as a college lecturer, and conducting acting lessons every year. As a result, she earned the nickname "Guillery," a portmanteau of her surname and "Hillary." This nickname reflected the perception that she was even busier than Hillary Clinton.

== Filmography ==
=== Film ===
Year	Title	Role	Notes/Ref.
2003	If You Were Me	Jeong-hyeon	
2005	Mapado	woman from Jeju	
2005	Flowering Day	Hee-jung	(short film)
2005	Friendly and Harmonious		(educational film)
2005	The Intimate	art factory manager	
2006	Art of Fighting	Yeong-ae's mother	
2007	Mapado 2	woman from Jeju	
2007	The Elephant on the Bike	Dong-gyu's mother	
2007	Seven Days	hospital director	
2007	I Need Some Sleep	mother	
2008	Living Together, Happy Together	Gyeong-mi	
2008	Baby and I	Ki-seok's mother	
2009	Breathless	Yeon-hee's mother	
2009	The Pot	Missionary Jang	
2009	Fortune Salon	Seung-won's sister-in-law	
2011	Late Blossom	Kun-bong's daughter-in-law	
2011	Re-encounter	Han-soo's mother	
2011	Meet the In-Laws	housekeeper	(special appearance)
2012	Choked	Hee-soo	
2012	Don't Cry Mommy	nun	
2013	Pluto	Joon's mother	
2013	If You Were Me 6	mother	
2013	Ingtoogi: The Battle of Internet Trolls	Tae-Sik's mother	
2014	Cart	Real customer	(special appearance)
2014	Our Older Sister	Bolero	(special appearance)
2014	In Her Place	mother	
2015	Granny's Got Talent	housemaid	(special appearance)
2016	Insane	Kang Soo-ah's mother	
2016	Missing	Ji-sun's mother-in-law	
2017	The Mimic	Kim Moo-nyeo	
2017	Memoir of a Murderer	Maria	
2017	The First Lap	Soo-hyun's mother	
2019	Mate	Geum-hee	
2019	Inseparable Bros	Jung-soon	
2019	Long Live The King	Choon-taek's mother	(special appearance)
2019	House of Hummingbird	Young-ji's mother	
2021	Midnight	Kyung-mi's mother	
2023	Unlocked	Je-yeon	
2023	Unforgivable	Hae-yeon	
2024	Dolphin	Jeong-ok	
2024	About Family	Mother superior	

=== Television series ===
Year	Title	Role	Notes/Ref.
2012	How Long I've Kissed	Ha Sum-jin	
2013	The End of the World	Jung Sang-sook	
2014	Secret Affair	Ms. Baek	
2014	Doctor Stranger	Kim Eun-hee (Oh Soo-hyun's mother)	
2015	Miss Mamma Mia	Ma Hae-yeon	
2015	Heard It Through the Grapevine	Yang Jae-hwa	
2015	Assembly	Chun No-shim	
2015	Cheer Up!	Director Lee	
2015	Riders: Catch Tomorrow	Bae Mi-Sun	
2016	Puck!	Gyeong-pil's mother	
2016	Moorim School: Saga of the Brave	Gye Mi-sook	(special appearance)
2016	Yeah, That's How It Is	So-hyang	
2016	Babysitter	Yoo Sang-won's mother	
2016	Goodbye Mr. Black	Hong In-ja	
2016	Working Mom Parenting Daddy	Lee Hae-soon	
2016	My Fair Lady	Kim Young-ji	
2017	Naked Fireman	Jeong-soon	
2017	Queen of Mystery	murderer	(special appearance)
2017	Hospital Ship	Hwang In-kyung's mother	(special appearance)
2017	The Most Beautiful Goodbye	Dr. Yoon	
2017	Two Cops	nun	
2018	Something in the Rain	Kim Mi-yeon (Jin-ah's mother)	
2018	What's Wrong with Secretary Kim	woman at parking	(special appearance)
2018	The Ghost Detective	Hwang Young-hee	
2018	Too Bright for Romance	Pil-yong's mother	KBS Drama Special (special appearance)
2018	Matrimonial Chaos	Jin Yoo-young's mother	(special appearance)
2018	Encounter	Teacher Lee (Tea house)	
2019	Possessed	Shin Geum-jo (Seo-jung's mother)	
2019	My Fellow Citizens!	Kim Kyung-ae (Sang-jin's mother)	
2019	One Spring Night	Shin Hyeong-seon (Jeong-in's mother)	
2019	Melting Me Softly	Yoo Hyang-ja (Mi-ran's mother)	
2019	Woman of 9.9 Billion	Jang Geum-ja	
2020	Find Me in Your Memory	Seo Mi-hyun	
2020	Do You Like Brahms?	Song Jeong-hee	
2021	Beyond Evil	Do Hae-won	
2021	Law School	Oh Jung-Hee	
2021	Voice	Gam Jong-suk	Season 4
2021	Drama Special – Scenery of Pain	old woman	
2022	Cleaning Up	Bo-ran	
2022	If You Wish Upon Me	Choi Deok-ja	
2022	Mental Coach Jegal	Shim Bok-ja	
2023	Strangers Again	Hong Yeo-rae	
2025	Head over Heels	Oh Ok-soon	
2025	The Winning Try	Kang Jeong-hyo	

=== Web series ===
Year	Title	Role	Notes	Ref.
2021	You Me Up	Do Yong-shik's mother	Cameo	
2021	The Silent Sea	Director Choi		
2023	One Day Off	Koo Young-sook	Cameo	

== Theater ==
Theater plays performances
Year	Title		Role	Theater	Date	Ref.
Year	English	Korean	Role	Theater	Date	Ref.
1994	Nostalgic Antoine	그리운 앙뜨완느		theater in Hyehwa-dong 1, Daehak-ro	September 1–6	
1995	Magic Eye. Scream!	매직 아이.스크림!		Batangol Small Theater	April 14–May 28	
2001	New Year's Day	돐날	Jeong-suk	Small theater at Daehak-ro Arts Center, Seoul	April 12–25	
2002	Onion	양파	Mother	Daehak-ro Batanggol Small Theater	April 4–28	
2002	The Kingdom of Things	사물의 왕국		National Theater's Daoreum Theater	June 6–9	
2002	Ahjumma in Room 405	405호 아줌마는	Ahjumma	Dongsung Arts Center Small Theater in Daehakro	September 13	
2003	Oxygen	산소	Mrs Priestley /Rosenbiysk	Small Theater of the Arts Theater of the Arts Promotion Agency	April 3–20	
2003	New Year's Day	돐날	Jeong-suk	Batanggol Theater in Seoul	May 8–June 1	
2003	Wart	사마귀		U Theater in Cheongdam-dong	July 8 to August 3	
2003	Mom Discovered the Sea When She Was Fifty	엄마는 오십에 바다를 발견했다	Daughter	Sanullim Small Theater	Sep 25–Nov 23	
2003	Cactus	선인장	Female	Cultural Arts Foundation's Hakjeon Blue Stage	December 22–30	
2004	Equus	에쿠우스	Dora Strang	Dongsung Art Centre Dongsung Hall	January 29–February 1	
2004	Equus	에쿠우스	Dora Strang	Dongsung Art Centre Dongsung Hall	February 2–March 7	
2005	Equus	에쿠우스	Dora Strang	Hakjeon Blue Small Theater	September 9–October 30	
2005	Getting Out	게팅 아웃		Hakjeon Blue Theater	May 4–22	
2006	Macbeth, The Show	맥베드, The Show	Lady Macbeth	Seoul Arts Center's Towol Theater	May 28–June 7	
2007	Fish Festival	물고기 축제	mother	Arungu Small Theater in Daehakro	May 24–June 17	
2008	I Live Because of You	너 때문에 산다	Gok-nyeo	Semo Theater at Daehakro Sado Art Center	January 3 to 20	
2008	Dream Within a Dream	꿈속의 꿈	Bo-hee	Arko Arts Theatre Small Theatre	April 30–May 2	
2008	Aloes Wood	침향	Ae-sook	Arko Arts Theatre Grand Theatre	June 11–29	
2008	The Remains of the House	남은 집	Pilgrimage	Guerrilla Theater	August 14–September 14	
2008	Tenant	임차인		Jeongbo Small Theater	October 17 to November 9	
2008	Human Time	인간의 시간	Park Tae-hyeong	Arko Arts Theater Grand Theater	December 19–27	
2009	Dear Yelena Sergeyevna	존경하는 엘레나 선생님	Yelena Sergeyevna	Arko Arts Theater Small Theater in Daehakro	March 12–29	
2009	Oxygen	산소	Mrs Priestley /Rosenbiysk	Doosan Art Center Space 111	May 5–10	
2009	Sisters	언니들	Sister	Dongsung Arts Center Small Theater	December 2–13	
2010	Even If They Betray You	그대를 속일지라도		Arko Arts Theater Grand Theater	June 18–27	
2010	33 Variations	33개의 변주곡	Gertrude	Dongsung Hall of Dongsung Art Center in Daehakro	October 15	
2010	Love is Coming	사랑이 온다	wife	Sogang University Mary Hall Grand Theater	December 1–5	
2011	New Year's Day	돐날	Gyeongju	Daehakro Art One Theater Hall 2	June 3–July 10	
2012	I Miss Your Parents' Faces	니 부모 얼굴이 보고 싶다	Nam Yoon-jung's mom	Sejong Center for the Performing Arts M Theater	June 24–July 29	
2013	Creditors	채권자들	Tekla	Arko Arts Theater Small Theater	May 10–26	
2013	The Women Who Stole a Battlefield	전쟁터를 훔친 여인들	Madge	National Theater Company, Baek Baek-hee Jang Min-ho Theater	November 27–December 8	
2014	Spring Days Gone	봄날은 간다		Daehakro Art Space Seoul	July 16–20	
2014	Shadow Child	그림자 아이	mother	National Theatre Baek Sung-hee Jang Min-ho Theatre	October 24–November 2	
2014	Great Legacy	위대한 유산	Habisham	Myeongdong Arts Theatre	December 3 to 28	
2015	Monroe Mom	먼로, 엄마	Mi-jin	Daehakro Petitchel Theater	January 22–February 8	
2018	Misery	미저리	Annie Wilkes	Doosan Art Center Yeongang Hall	February 9–April 15	
2019	Misery	미저리	Annie Wilkes	Sejong Center for the Performing Arts M Theater	July 13–September 15	
2019	Misery	미저리	Annie Wilkes	Contemporary Art Museum Main Performance Hall, Ulsan	October 4–5	
2019	Misery	미저리	Annie Wilkes	Dream Theater, Busan	October 11–13	
2019	Misery	미저리	Annie Wilkes	Guri Art Hall Cosmos Grand Theater	November 8–9	
2022	Hamlet	햄릿	Actor 2	National Theater Haeoreum Theater	July 13–August 13	
2022–2023	Misery	미저리	Annie Wilkes	Sejong Center for the Performing Arts M Theater	December 24–February 5	

== Awards and nominations ==
List of Award(s) and Nomination(s)
Year	Award ceremony	Category	Nominee / Work	Result	Ref.
2002	Seoul Performing Arts Festival	Best Actress	Gil Ha-yeon; Changpa Theater Company	Won	
2008	29th Seoul Theater Festival	Best Actress	Dream Within a Dream	Won	
2008	Korea Theater Awards	Best Actress	Gil Ha-yeon	Won	
2010	47th Donga Theater Awards (Note: The Dong-A Theater Awards (동아연극상) established in 1964 to expand and develop the base of Korean theater, have contributed to the revitalization of Korean theater by selecting and awarding performers, theater troupes and organizations that have performed outstandingly every year.)	Best Acting Award	Love is Coming	Won	
2011	16th Hiseo Theater Awards (Note: The Hi-seo Theater Awards (히서연극상) was established in 1996 by theatre critic Gu Hee-seo (구히서) (1939 to 2019). In 1996, the first year started with the Theatre of the Year Award. Since 1997, two winners were selected, one each for The Theater Man of the Year and The Theatre Award. Winners were given plaques and prizes funded from The Metaa wine party auction that takes place a month before the awards ceremony. The last award ceremony was in 2015.)	Actor of the Year	Gil Ha-yeon	Won	
2011	Shenzhen Film Festival	Best Actress	Gil Ha-yeon	Won	
2015	APAN Star Awards	Best Supporting Actress	Heard It Through the Grapevine	Won	
2015	25th Lee Hae-rang Theater Award (Note: The Lee Hae-rang Theater Award was established by the Lee Hae-rang Theater Foundation to commemorate the Lee Hae-rang, a pioneer in the Korean theater industry.)	Best Actress	Gil Ha-yeon	Won	
2016	3rd Wildflower Film Awards	Best Supporting Actress	In Her Place	Won	
2025	2025 SBS Drama Awards	Best Supporting Actress in a Miniseries Humanity/Fantasy Drama	The Haunted Palace & The Winning Try	Won	
