= Baek Ji-won =

South Korean actress (born 1973)

- Born: April 30, 1973 (age 53); South Korea
- Education: Kyung Hee University (BSc in Horticulture)
- Occupation: Actress
- Years active: 1996–present
- Agent: Lead Entertainment

Korean name
- Hangul: 백지원
- RR: Baek Jiwon
- MR: Paek Chiwŏn

Baek Ji-won (Korean: 백지원; born April 30, 1973) is a South Korean actress. She graduated in Horticultural Science from Kyung Hee University. She made her acting debut in 1996 in play My father got cancer. She is known for her role in television series Once Again (2020), apart from that she appeared in film Solace (2007) and television series The Fiery Priest (2019) and Do You Like Brahms? (2020). She has appeared in television dramas Encounter (2018–19), Racket Boys (2021), Melancholia (2021).

== Career ==
Baek Ji-won grew up in an ordinary family with one brother and one sister, none of whom were artists. Despite being a quiet and diligent student, she found herself drawn to a friend at Ewha Girls' High School who exuded a unique and free-spirited vibe as a member of the drama club. Intrigued, she joined the drama club out of curiosity. However, her parents opposed her desire to major in drama in college, so she pursued horticulture instead. To satisfy her passion for acting, she continued to participate in the school drama club. After college, she joined the Yeonwoo Theater Company. Her debut performance was in 'My Dad Has Cancer' in 1996, which her father attended and saw her act for the first time.

Baek naturally expanded her field to movies and dramas without ever auditioning for them herself. She was always focused on her performances, and it was usually the production team that noticed her talent and cast her. In 2012, she gained recognition on TV with JTBC's How Long I've Kissed, directed by Ahn Pan-seok and written by Jeong Seong-ju. The casting director who saw Baek's performance recommended her for the role.

== Filmography ==
=== Film ===
Year	Title	Role	Notes	Ref.
2003	If You Were Me			
2006	Solace	Sim In-sook		
2007	Attack on the Pin-Up Boys			
2011	The Apprehenders	Social worker		
2013	Montage	Detective		
2014	Han Gong-ju	Head Nurse		
2017	The Poet and the Boy	Teok Joo-ga-ri		
2018	In Between Seasons	Sook-jung		
2019	Family Affair			
2022	Birth	Mother Kursula		
2023	Dream	Sun-ja		

=== Television series ===
Key
†	Denotes television productions that have not yet been released

Year	Title	Role	Notes	Ref.
2012	How Long I've Kissed			
2014	Secret Affair	Wang Jeong-hee		
2015	The Family is Coming	Choi Dal-ja		
2015	Heard It Through the Grapevine	Yoo Shin-young		
2015	I Have a Lover	Choi Jin-ri		
2016	Lucky Romance			
2016	A Beautiful Mind	Wife of glioblastoma patient	Special appearance	
2016	Woman with a Suitcase			
2017	Innocent Defendant	Eun-hye's aunt		
2017	Super Family	Sex education teacher		
2017	Fight for My Way	High school teacher		
2017	Reunited Worlds	Landlord		
2017	My Golden Life	Soon-Ok Cho		
2017	Mad Dog	Oh Seo-ra		
2018	About Time	Wife	Special appearance	
2018	The Undateables	Bong Sun-hwa		
2018	Your Honor	Cha Hong-ran		
2018–2019	Encounter	Joo Yeon-ja		
2019–2024	The Fiery Priest	Kim In-kyung	Season 1–2	
2019	Trap	Ms. Joe		
2019	My Fellow Citizens!	Park Jin-hee		
2019	Everything and Nothing	Doctor	Special appearance	
2019	Be Melodramatic	Jeong Hye-jeong		
2019	Miss Lee	Choi Yeong-ja		
2019	KBS Drama Special	Tony	Episode: "Understanding Dance"	
2020	Tell Me What You Saw	Kim Na-hee	Special appearance	
2020	Once Again	Jang Ok-ja		
2020	How to Buy a Friend	Oh Jung-hee		
2020	Mystic Pop-up Bar	Mrs. Andong	Special appearance	
2020	Do You Like Brahms?	Lee Soo-kyung		
2020–2021	Awaken	Lee Taek-jo		
2021	Missing Child			
2021	Sell Your Haunted House	Lee Eun-hye		
2021	Mad for Each Other	Kim In-ja		
2021	Racket Boys	Shin Song-hee		
2021	The Road: The Tragedy of One	Kwon Yeo-jin		
2021	High Class		Special appearance	
2021	KBS Drama Special	Yoon Kwang-sook	Episode: "Scenery of Pain"	
2021	Melancholia	Min Hee-seung		
2021	Artificial City	Kwon Min-sun	Special appearance	
2021	Snowdrop	Choi Mi-hye		
2022	Anna	Hyeon-joo's mother		
2022	Extraordinary Attorney Woo	Han Sun-young		
2022	Once Upon a Small Town	Jang Se-ryeon		
2022	Cheer Up	Hwang Jin-hee		
2022	Trolley	Baek Ji-won	Special appearance	
2023	Race	Kim Hee-young		
2023	The Deal	Min-woo's mother		
2024	Chicken Nugget		Special appearance	
2024	Goodbye Earth	Oh Gye-hyang		
2024	Connection	CEO Yoon		
2024	Cinderella at 2 AM	Kim Hee-sook	Special appearance	
2024	Parole Examiner Lee	Choi Hwa-ran		
2025	When Life Gives You Tangerines	Hong Kyung-ja		
2025	Kick Kick Kick Kick	Baek Ji-won		
2025	To the Moon	Hye-joo	Special appearance	
2025	First Lady	Park Sang-hee		
2025	Would You Marry Me?	Kim Mi-yeon		
2026	My Royal Nemesis	Hong Bu-seon		
2026	Spooky in Love	Ok Kye-hee		
2026	The Substitute †	Baek Seon-hee		

== Stage ==
=== Theater ===
Theater plays performances
Year	Title		Role	Theater	Date	Ref.
Year	English	Korean	Role	Theater	Date	Ref.
1996	My father, the talkative one, has cancer	떠벌이 우리 아버지 암에 걸리셨네		Yeonwoo Small Theater in Daehangno	Dec 22–31	
2005	Asking the Blind Father for Directions	눈 먼 아비에게 길을 묻다	Aunt	National Theater's Byeoloreum Theater	May 4–22	
2005	Asking the Blind Father for Directions	눈 먼 아비에게 길을 묻다	Aunt	Seoul Arts Center's Jayu Small Theater	June 17 – July 17	
2007	A Pleasant Deal	유쾌한 거래	Jeong-suk	Daehangno Showtic Theater Hall 1 from the 31st	May 31 – June 17	
2009–2010	Ask the Blind Father for Directions	하류인생에도 삶은 있어	Aunt	Seondol Theater in Daehangno, Seoul	Sep 25 – Jan 24	
2010	Shoot My Heart	내 심장을 쏴라		Namsan Arts Center Drama Center	Oct 7–24	
2011–2012	Good News in Our Neighborhood	우리동네 굿뉴스		Daehakro Seondol Theater	Dec 13, 2011 – Jan 15, 2012	
2011	The 32nd Seoul Theater Festival: If There's a Peach Blossom, Pine Flowers Will Fly	(제32회) 서울연극제: 복사꽃 지면 송화 날리고	Mother	Arko Arts Theater Small Theater	May 6–8	
2012	I Miss Your Parents' Faces	니 부모 얼굴이 보고 싶다	Kim Ji-soo	Sejong Center for the Performing Arts M Theater	June 24 – July 29	
2013	This is Home	여기가 집이다	Mrs. Yang	Yeonwoo Small Theater (Daehakro)	June 28 – July 21	
2013	Where Are You Going, Mr. Recovery	어디가세요 복구씨	Park Soon-yi	Theater Laboratory, 1 Hyehwa-dong	Nov 1–17	
2014	Living Double Life	살아있는 이중생 각하		National Theater Daloreum Theater	Sep 12–28	
2014	Pillars of Society	김광보 연출 사회의 기둥들	Mrs. Holt	LG Arts Center	Nov 19–30	
2016	Rain	비	Catherine	Project Box View	Nov 11–30	
2017, 2018	Why Rooftop Garden Peppers	옥상 밭 고추는 왜		Sejong Cultural Center M Theater	April 12–22	
2018	Termites in the Desert	사막 속의 흰개미	Yoon Hyun-sook	Sejong Cultural Center S Theater	Nov 9–25	
2023	Cherry Orchard	벚꽃 동산	Lyubov Andreyevna Ranevskaya	Myeongdong Art Theater	May 4–28	

== Awards and nominations ==
Award ceremony	Year	Category	Nominee / Work	Result	Ref.
APAN Star Awards	2022	Best Supporting Actress	Extraordinary Attorney Woo, Anna	Won	
40th Dong-A Theater Awards (Note: The Dong-A Theater Awards (동아연극상) established in 1964 to expand and develop the base of Korean theater, have contributed to the revitalization of Korean theater by selecting and awarding performers, theater troupes and organizations that have performed outstandingly every year.)	2004	Yoo In-chon New Actor Award	Baek Ji-won	Won	
KBS Drama Awards	2020	Best Supporting Actress	How to Buy a Friend; Once Again	Nominated	
SBS Drama Awards	2019	Best Supporting Team	The Fiery Priest	Won	
SBS Drama Awards	2019	Excellence Award, Actress in a Mid-Length Drama	The Fiery Priest	Nominated	
