= Heard It Through the Grapevine (TV series) =

2015 South Korean Television Series

- Also known as: Heard It as a Rumor; I Heard a Rumor
- Genre: Drama; Satire; Black comedy; Family; Romance
- Created by: Han Jung-hwan
- Written by: Jung Sung-joo
- Directed by: Ahn Pan-seok
- Starring: Yoo Jun-sang; Yoo Ho-jeong; Lee Joon; Go Ah-sung
- Composer: Lee Nam-yeon
- Country of origin: South Korea
- Original language: Korean
- No. of episodes: 30

Production
- Executive producers: Gil Don-seop (Ep. 1–16); Kim Hee-yeol (Ep. 17–30) (Note: On April 15, SBS announced that Pan Entertainment (producer of Winter Sonata, Moon Embracing the Sun, Man from the Equator, Mama, 4 Legendary Witches and Kill Me, Heal Me, among others) will assume the production duties for Heard It Through the Grapevine instead of Paulownia (producer of Secret Door). According to SBS, that was because of "internal issues" within Paulownia. Therefore, Pan Entertainment vice-president Kim Hee-yeol became the co-executive producer replacing Paulownia CEO Gil Don-seop.)
- Producer: Lee Sang-min
- Cinematography: Kang Seung-gi; Lee Seok-min
- Editor: Jo Eun-kyung
- Running time: 65 minutes
- Production companies: Paulownia (Ep. 1–16); Pan Entertainment (Ep. 17–30)

Original release
- Network: SBS TV
- Release: February 23 – June 2, 2015

Heard It Through the Grapevine (Korean: 풍문으로 들었소; RR: Pungmuneuro deureotso) is a 2015 South Korean television series starring Yoo Jun-sang, Yoo Ho-jeong, Go Ah-sung, and Lee Joon. It aired on SBS from February 23 to June 2, 2015 on Mondays and Tuesdays at 21:55 for 30 episodes.

== Plot ==
Heard It Through the Grapevine is a black comedy that satirizes the way of life of Korea's upper class, who wield enormous power and thrive on inherited wealth and lineage.

Han Jeong-ho (Yoo Jun-sang), and Choi Yeon-hee (Yoo Ho-jeong), are a wealthy couple from a prestigious family. Their reputation is suddenly turned upside down because their teenage son, Han In-sang (Lee Joon), impregnates his girlfriend from an ordinary family, Seo Bom (Go Ah-sung). Bom is determined to endure being isolated from her own family and humiliated from her in-laws for the sake of her child's future, while In-sang struggles between his love for Bom and his family's high expectations.

== Cast ==
=== Main characters ===
- Yoo Jun-sang as Han Jeong-ho (47)

The patriarch of the Han family, a prestigious and wealthy clan which for generations has produced many highly respected and successful lawyers who've influenced South Korea's politics and economy. Like his predecessors, Jeong-ho is strict and a perfectionist.

- Yoo Ho-jeong as Choi Yeon-hee (45)

Jeong-ho's beautiful, elegant and intelligent socialite wife. She secretly knows that her son feels burdened and pressured to live up to his family's expectations, but has never spoken up about it.

- Lee Joon as Han In-sang (18)

Jeong-ho and Yeon-hee's son. In-sang has received the best education and upbringing that money can buy. On the surface he seems like a perfect boy, but he actually feels pressured by his family and peers. Even though Bom told him not to meet her again, his love for her makes him break his promise.

- Go Ah-sung as Seo Bom (18)

The second-eldest daughter of an ordinary family living in a poor neighborhood. She is determined to have a better future, therefore she strives hard in her studies. Smart, popular, and well-spoken, she was chosen to attend a prestigious English camp, where she meets and falls in love with Han In-sang.

=== Supporting characters ===
- Jang Hyun-sung as Seo Hyeong-shik (47)
- Yoon Bok-in as Kim Jin-ae (45)
- Gong Seung-yeon as Seo Noo-ri (22)
- Ye Soo-jung as Joo-young's mother
- Joo Min-kyung as Noo-ri's colleague
- Jeon Suk-chan as Seo Chul-shik (43)
- Park So-young as Han Yi-ji (16)
- Baek Ji-yeon as Ji Young-ra (45)
- Jang Ho-il as Song Jae-won (45)
- Kim Ho-jung as Uhm So-jeong (45)
- Seo Jeong-yeon as Lee Seon-sook (43)
- Lee Sun-joo as Hong Geum-yeon (60)
- Gil Hae-yeon as Yang Jae-hwa (53)
- Jang So-yeon as Min Joo-young (29)
- Lee Hwa-ryong as Kim Tae-woo (35)
- Park Jin-young as Baek Dae-hun (60)
- Baek Ji-won as Yoo Shin-young (37)
- Kim Kwon as Yoon Je-hoon (26)
- Jung Yoo-jin as Jang Hyun-soo (18)
- Kim Jung-young as Jung-soon (55)
- Jung Ga-ram as Sung Min-jae (18)
- Kim Hak-sun as Butler Park (58)

== Ratings ==
| Ep. | Original broadcast date | Average audience share | | | |
| Ep. | Original broadcast date | TNmS | | AGB Nielsen | |
| Ep. | Original broadcast date | Nationwide | Seoul | Nationwide | Seoul |
|---|---|---|---|---|---|
| 1 | February 23, 2015 | 6.8% | 8.7% | 7.2% | 8.3% |
| 2 | February 24, 2015 | 7.9% | 10.6% | 8.1% | 9.7% |
| 3 | March 2, 2015 | 7.0% | 9.9% | 6.5% | 7.2% |
| 4 | March 3, 2015 | 7.9% | 10.5% | 8.7% | 10.0% |
| 5 | March 9, 2015 | 8.1% | 10.2% | 8.3% | 9.4% |
| 6 | March 10, 2015 | 8.3% | 10.7% | 9.0% | 10.4% |
| 7 | March 16, 2015 | 8.2% | 10.5% | 10.1% | 11.8% |
| 8 | March 17, 2015 | 8.3% | 11.1% | 9.3% | 10.6% |
| 9 | March 23, 2015 | 8.7% | 11.5% | 10.7% | 13.0% |
| 10 | March 24, 2015 | 9.4% | 12.5% | 10.5% | 12.2% |
| 11 | March 30, 2015 | 9.1% | 11.9% | 10.3% | 12.1% |
| 12 | March 31, 2015 | 9.5% | 12.7% | 12.0% | 13.7% |
| 13 | April 6, 2015 | 9.2% | 11.7% | 11.3% | 12.4% |
| 14 | April 7, 2015 | 10.3% | 13.2% | 11.0% | 12.3% |
| 15 | April 13, 2015 | 10.5% | 13.2% | 11.6% | 13.3% |
| 16 | April 14, 2015 | 10.1% | 13.1% | 11.7% | 12.9% |
| 17 | April 20, 2015 | 11.1% | 13.4% | 11.6% | 12.2% |
| 18 | April 21, 2015 | 11.3% | 13.6% | 12.8% | 13.6% |
| 19 | April 27, 2015 | 9.8% | 12.1% | 11.1% | 12.9% |
| 20 | April 28, 2015 | 10.9% | 14.2% | 12.2% | 13.7% |
| 21 | May 4, 2015 | 8.3% | 10.2% | 9.3% | 9.8% |
| 22 | May 5, 2015 | 10.8% | 14.1% | 10.9% | 11.6% |
| 23 | May 11, 2015 | 9.3% | 11.3% | 10.6% | 11.5% |
| 24 | May 12, 2015 | 9.4% | 11.4% | 10.1% | 10.6% |
| 25 | May 18, 2015 | 8.8% | 10.9% | 10.4% | 11.3% |
| 26 | May 19, 2015 | 9.2% | 11.7% | 10.8% | 11.8% |
| 27 | May 25, 2015 | 9.3% | 11.6% | 10.0% | 11.5% |
| 28 | May 26, 2015 | 9.2% | 11.4% | 9.8% | 11.2% |
| 29 | June 1, 2015 | 9.6% | 12.0% | 11.0% | 12.0% |
| 30 | June 2, 2015 | 11.1% | 14.9% | 11.7% | 12.9% |
| Average | | 9.2% | 11.8% | 10.3% | 11.5% |

== Awards and nominations ==
| Year | Award | Category | Recipient | Result |
|---|---|---|---|---|
| 2015 | 51st Baeksang Arts Awards | Best Drama | Heard It Through the Grapevine | Won |
| 2015 | 51st Baeksang Arts Awards | Best Director | Ahn Pan-seok | Nominated |
| 2015 | 51st Baeksang Arts Awards | Best Screenplay | Jung Sung-joo | Nominated |
| 2015 | 51st Baeksang Arts Awards | Best New Actor | Lee Joon | Nominated |
| 2015 | 51st Baeksang Arts Awards | Best New Actress | Go Ah-sung | Won |
| 2015 | 51st Baeksang Arts Awards | Best New Actress | Baek Ji-yeon | Nominated |
| 2015 | 8th Korea Drama Awards | Best Drama | Heard It Through the Grapevine | Nominated |
| 2015 | 8th Korea Drama Awards | Best Production Director | Ahn Pan-seok | Nominated |
| 2015 | 8th Korea Drama Awards | Top Excellence Award, Actor | Yoo Jun-sang | Nominated |
| 2015 | 8th Korea Drama Awards | Excellence Award, Actor | Lee Joon | Won |
| 2015 | 4th APAN Star Awards | Top Excellence Award, Actor in a Serial Drama | Yoo Jun-sang | Nominated |
| 2015 | 4th APAN Star Awards | Top Excellence Award, Actress in a Serial Drama | Yoo Ho-jeong | Nominated |
| 2015 | 4th APAN Star Awards | Excellence Award, Actor in a Serial Drama | Lee Joon | Won |
| 2015 | 4th APAN Star Awards | Excellence Award, Actress in a Serial Drama | Go Ah-sung | Nominated |
| 2015 | 4th APAN Star Awards | Best Supporting Actor | Jang Hyun-sung | Nominated |
| 2015 | 4th APAN Star Awards | Best Supporting Actress | Gil Hae-yeon | Won |
| 2015 | 4th APAN Star Awards | Best New Actress | Baek Ji-yeon | Nominated |
| 2015 | SBS Drama Awards | Top Excellence Award, Actor in a Drama Special | Yoo Jun-sang | Won |
| 2015 | SBS Drama Awards | Excellence Award, Actress in a Drama Special | Go Ah-sung | Won |
| 2015 | SBS Drama Awards | Special Award, Actor in a Drama Special | Jang Hyun-sung | Won |
| 2015 | SBS Drama Awards | New Star Award | Go Ah-sung | Won |
| 2015 | SBS Drama Awards | New Star Award | Gong Seung-yeon | Won |
