= Between Steps =

2026 South Korean television series

- Promotional poster
- Hangul: 연애박사
- Lit.: Love Doctor
- RR: Yeonae baksa
- MR: Yŏnae paksa
- Genre: Romance; Coming-of-age
- Written by: Min Hyo-jung
- Directed by: Ahn Pan-seok
- Starring: Choo Young-woo; Kim So-hyun
- Music by: Lee Nam-yeon
- Country of origin: South Korea
- Original language: Korean
- No. of episodes: 12

Production
- Running time: 60 minutes
- Production companies: KT Studio Genie; Studio Goti

Original release
- Network: ENA
- Release: October 5 – November 10, 2026

Between Steps (Korean: 연애박사) is a 2026 South Korean romance coming-of-age television series written by Min Hyo-jung, directed by Ahn Pan-seok, and starring Choo Young-woo and Kim So-hyun. The series depicts the romance of two youths blooming in a robotics laboratory. It aired on ENA from October 5, to November 10, 2026, every Monday and Tuesday at 22:00 (KST). It is also available for streaming on Genie TV in South Korea, and on Disney+ and Hulu in selected regions.

== Premise ==
Set in a robotics lab, it follows the lives of Park Min-jae, a doctoral student who lost his leg to illness after previously being a swimmer, and Lim Yu-jin, a master's student who pursued a new path after experiencing career uncertainty.

== Cast and characters ==
=== Main ===
- Choo Young-woo as Park Min-jae

A Ph.D. student in Robotics at the Department of Mechanical Engineering in Seohan University. He is also an assistant and lab manager in Professor Ahn Jae-hong's research laboratory.

- Kim So-hyun as Lim Yu-jin

A Master's student in Robotics at the Department of Mechanical Engineering, Seohan University. She is also a research student in Professor Ahn Jae-hong's research laboratory.

=== Supporting ===
- Park Hyuk-kwon as Lim Yong-seok

Yu-jin's father and the owner of Jeil Car Center.

- Seo Jeong-yeon as Seo Mi-young

Yu-jin's mother, who manages accounting at her husband's car center.

- Kim Min-seok as Yoo-sung

Yu-jin's older brother by one year, who works as a mechanic at the car center to help his parents.

- Shim Hye-jin as Hong Eun-joo

Min-jae's mother.

- Lee Kyu-sung as Eom Tae-ho

The brain of robotics laboratory at Seohan University.

- Lee Suk-hyeong as Bae Chan-soo

A robotics laboratory member at Seohan University.

- Kim Min as Choi Han-gyeol

The youngest member of robotics laboratory at Seohan University.

- Lim Jin-hyo as Kim Se-jin

The newest member of robotics laboratory at Seohan University.

- Lee Chang-hoon as Ahn Jae-hong

A mechanical and robotics engineering professor at Seohan University.

- Jang In-sub as Lee Ji-hoon

The youngest professor in the Department of Mathematics at Seohan University.

- Ryu Kyung-in as Kang Mi-ran

A clothing and textiles professor at Seohan University.

- Han Do-yi as Cha Seo-hyun

A manager in a research team at a large corporation.

== Production ==
Kim So-hyun and Choo Young-woo were reportedly cast in November 2025 and confirmed to lead the series by December 2025. It is directed by Ahn Pan-seok, written by Min Hyo-jung, planned by KT Studio Genie, and produced by Studio Goti. Kim Min-seok, Seo Jeong-yeon, Park Hyuk-kwon, Shim Hye-jin, Lee Kyu-sung, Jang In-sub, Lee Chang-hoon, Kim Min, Lee Suk-hyeong, and Han Do-yi were cast for various supporting roles.

The series marked Min's return to television drama writing after a hiatus of approximately 20 years following her work on Rules of Love (2005). The project also reunites Min and Ahn, who previously collaborated on the MBC drama Say It with Your Eyes (2000–2001). Production preparations began after Studio Goti reestablished contact with Min, and director Ahn subsequently praised the scripts for their logical consistency and depth. Choo and Kim was strongly recommended by the production company and directing department. Director Ahn commended Choo for his professionalism and intelligent approach on set, and praised Kim for her efforts to avoid conventional acting habits and deliver a distinct performance.

Principal photography was completed for about four months after beginning production in November 2025, and wrapped up on February 28, 2026.

The series reflects the artistic philosophy and working methods of the late director Ahn. Known for his realist aesthetic, Ahn maintained that television dramas should serve as a substitute for literature, approaching scripts with rigorous attention to detail and internal consistency. Rather than relying on sensationalism, his production style prioritized character-driven narratives and authentic human exploration. Collaborators have noted his clear directorial focus, minimal take counts, and strong trust in his cast and crew, elements that defined his final project.

== Original soundtrack ==
Led by music director Lee Nam-yeon in collaboration with overseas musicians, the soundtrack is designed to accompany the emotional development of the drama's central relationship, featuring tracks by artists such as The Restless Age, Margaret Glaspy, and Rachael Yamagata. SLL's music YouTube channel, Gogosing, previewed the highlight tracks for the drama's original soundtrack through its Pre-Ticket content on September 30, 2026.

== Release ==
In March 2026, Between Steps was scheduled to be broadcast on ENA's Monday and Tuesday timeslot in October 2026. Later, ENA confirmed the premiere date of the series would be on October 5, at 22:00 (KST). It is also available for streaming on Genie TV in South Korea, and on Disney+ and Hulu in selected regions.

== Viewership ==
Between Steps : South Korea viewers per episode (thousands)

Season	Episode number												Average
Season	1	2	3	4	5	6	7	8	9	10	11	12	Average
1	417	530	490	498	493	562	504	626	650	666	634	759	569

Source: Audience measurement performed nationwide by Nielsen Korea.

Average TV viewership ratings
Ep.	Original broadcast date	Average audience share (Nielsen Korea)	
Ep.	Original broadcast date	Nationwide	Seoul
1	October 5, 2026	1.762% (3rd)	1.421% (6th)
2	October 6, 2026	2.359% (2nd)	2.020% (2nd)
3	October 12, 2026	2.089% (3rd)	2.054% (3rd)
4	October 13, 2026	2.250% (2nd)	2.069% (2nd)
5	October 19, 2026	2.156% (2nd)	1.887% (2nd)
6	October 20, 2026	2.447% (2nd)	1.985% (2nd)
7	October 26, 2026	2.221% (2nd)	2.069% (2nd)
8	October 27, 2026	2.737% (2nd)	2.386% (2nd)
9	November 2, 2026	2.809% (2nd)	2.587% (2nd)
10	November 3, 2026	2.821% (2nd)	2.747% (2nd)
11	November 9, 2026	2.883% (2nd)	2.675% (2nd)
12	November 10, 2026	3.463% (2nd)	3.506% (2nd)
Average		2.500%	2.284%
In the table above, the blue numbers represent the lowest ratings and the red numbers represent the highest ratings.; This drama aired on a cable channel/pay TV which normally has a relatively smaller audience compared to free-to-air TV/public broadcasters (KBS, SBS, MBC, and EBS).
