= The End of the World (TV series) =

2013 South Korean television series

- Promotional poster
- Hangul: 세계의 끝
- RR: Segyeui kkeut
- MR: Segyeŭi kkŭt
- Genre: Disaster
- Based on: Infectious Disease by Bae Young-ik
- Written by: Park Hye-ryun
- Directed by: Ahn Pan-seok
- Starring: Yoon Je-moon; Jang Kyung-ah; Jang Hyun-sung
- Country of origin: South Korea
- Original language: Korean
- No. of episodes: 12

Production
- Running time: 70 minutes
- Production company: Drama House

Original release
- Network: JTBC
- Release: March 16 – May 5, 2013

The End of the World (Korean: 세계의 끝; RR: Segyeui kkeut) is a 2013 South Korean television series starring Yoon Je-moon, Jang Kyung-ah and Jang Hyun-sung. Based on the 2010 novel Infectious Disease by Bae Young-ik, it aired on JTBC from March 16 to May 5, 2013.

== Synopsis ==
As a virus with a 100% fatality rate spreads in Seoul, Kang Joo-hun (Yoon Je-moon) and other investigators from the Korea Centers for Disease Control and Prevention try to find a cure.

== Cast ==
=== Main ===
- Yoon Je-moon as Kang Joo-hun
- Jang Kyung-ah as Lee Na-hyun
- Jang Hyun-sung as Yoon Gyu-jin

=== Supporting ===
- Kim Chang-wan as Choi Soo-chul
- Park Hyuk-kwon as Kim Hee-sang
- Gil Hae-yeon as Jung Sang-sook
- Lee Hwa-ryong as Park Do-kyung
- Song Sam-dong as Kim Dae-ik
- Kim Yong-min as Eo Gi-young
- Ye Soo-jung as Na-hyun's mother
- Park In-young as Kim Soo-jin
- Heo Jung-do as Lee Sung-wook
- Jun Suk-chan as Oh Jung-soo
- Yoon Bok-in as Park Joo-hee
- Jang Yong-cheol as Son Byung-shik
- Park Seo-yeon as Soo-jung
- Kim Jong-tae as Boo San-hae

== Production ==
The series was originally scheduled to air for 20 episodes but, due to the low ratings, JTBC announced on April 11, 2013 that The End of the World would be shortened by 8 episodes (bringing the total number of episodes to 12). The time slot was also changed: from April 14 to the last broadcast, only one episode was aired a week instead of the usual two.

== Ratings ==
In this table, the blue numbers represent the lowest ratings and the red numbers represent the highest ratings.

| Ep. | Original broadcast date | Average audience share (AGB Nielsen) |
| Ep. | Original broadcast date | Nationwide |
|---|---|---|
| 1 | March 16, 2013 | 0.761% |
| 2 | March 17, 2013 | 0.599% |
| 3 | March 23, 2013 | 0.411% |
| 4 | March 24, 2013 | 0.463% |
| 5 | March 30, 2013 | 0.300% |
| 6 | March 31, 2013 | 0.293% |
| 7 | April 6, 2013 | 0.400% |
| 8 | April 7, 2013 | 0.417% |
| 9 | April 14, 2013 | 0.443% |
| 10 | April 20, 2013 | 0.519% |
| 11 | April 27, 2013 | 0.326% |
| 12 | May 5, 2013 | 0.279% |
| Average | | 0.434% |

- This drama airs on a cable channel/pay TV which normally has a relatively smaller audience compared to free-to-air TV/public broadcasters (KBS, SBS, MBC and EBS).
