= Park In-young =

South Korean actress and singer (born 1982)

- Born: 18 March 1982 (age 44); Seoul, South Korea
- Occupations: Actress; singer; model; dancer
- Years active: 2009–present
- Relatives: Leeteuk (brother)
- Website: Official Twitter

Park In-young (Korean: 박인영; born 18 March 1982) is a South Korean actress and singer. She debuted in 2009 with the musical Boeing Boeing (보잉보잉). She graduated from Chung-Ang University.

== Early life ==
Park In-young was born on 18 March 1982, in Seoul, South Korea. Park is the older sister of Leeteuk, a member of the boy band Super Junior. She resided in New Zealand before returning to South Korea following her parents' wishes. At one point, she studied at Chung-Ang University in the theater department. She is a Protestant.

== Filmography ==
=== Television ===
Year	Title	Role	Network	Ref.
2011	Big Hit		E Channel	
2011	Real School!	Park In-young	MBC Every1	
2013	The End of the World	Kim Soo-jin	JTBC	

=== Films ===
Year	Title	Role	Ref.
2010	A Friend In Need	loan shark office employee	
2012	Just Friends	Se-Mi	
2013	Way Back Home		

=== Music video appearance ===
Year	Title	Artist	Ref.
2012	"I Believe"	Blue Near Mother	

=== Theatre ===
Year	Title	Role	Note	Ref.
2007	Happy Together			
2009	New Boeing Boeing	Hye-soo	Performed at Doore Hall in Daehangno, Seoul from July 1– December 31	
2014	Uyeonhi Haengbokaejida (Note: literally Accidentally Being Happy)		Acted in the leading role, performed nationwide	
2014	Dambaegage Agassi (Note: literally Tobacco Shop Lady)	Yuna	Leading role	
2016	CCIG-K		Historical play	
2018	Avocado Tree	Miso	Performed at Daehangno Public Theater from May 23 to June 3	
2020	Outside the Door		Performed at Doosan Art Center from July 25 until August 1	

== Discography ==
=== Single album ===
Title	Album details	Track listing	Peak chart positions
Title	Album details	Track listing	KOR
Longing (그리움)	Released: August 8, 2012; Label: INY Company/Universal Music Korea; Formats: Digital download; Language: Korean	Track listing: 1. "I Really Miss You" (니가 참 그립다); 2. "I Really Miss You (Inst.) (니가 참 그립다 (Inst.))"	—
"—" denotes releases that did not chart or were not released in that region.
