= Park Hyuk-kwon =

South Korean actor (born 1971)

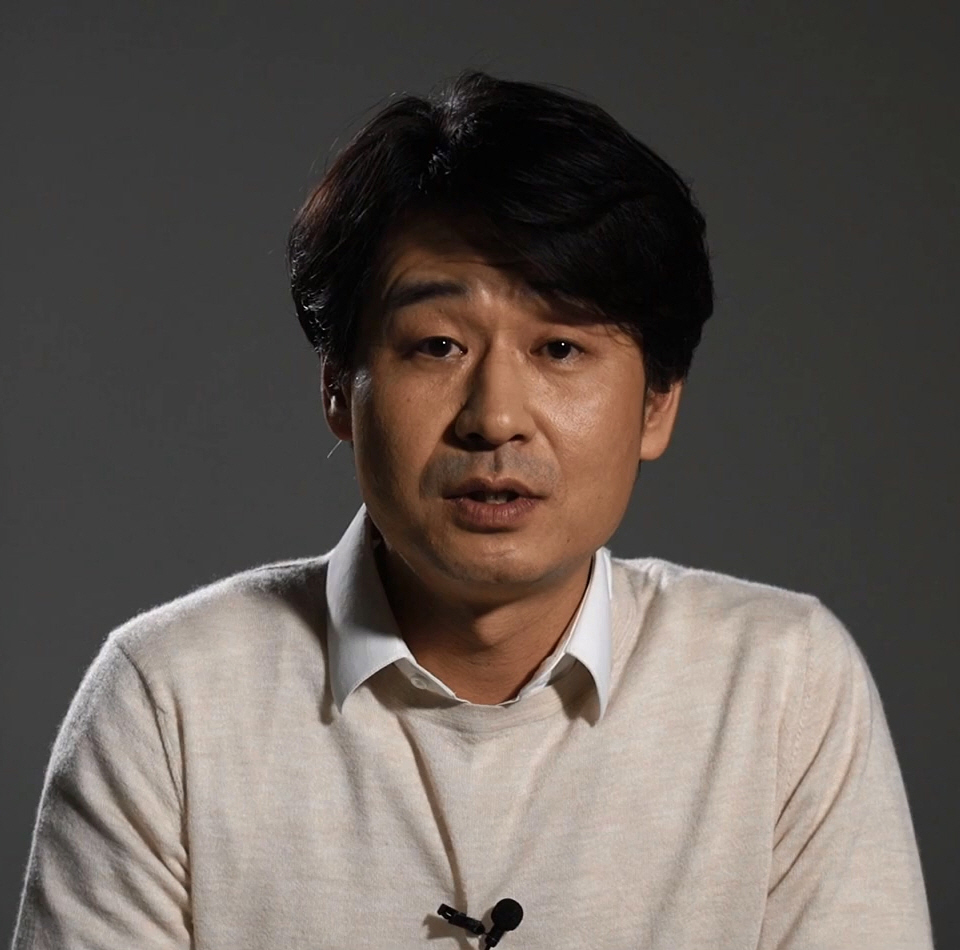
- Park in August 2017
- Born: July 11, 1971 (age 55); Incheon, South Korea
- Education: Seoul Institute of the Arts (Theater)
- Occupation: Actor
- Years active: 1993–present
- Agent: Mystic Story

Korean name
- Hangul: 박혁권
- Hanja: 朴赫權
- RR: Bak Hyeokgwon
- MR: Pak Hyŏkkwŏn
- Website: hyukwon.com

Park Hyuk-kwon (Korean: 박혁권; born July 11, 1971) is a South Korean actor. Park began his acting career in 1993 as a member of the theater troupe Sanulrim. He later became a well-regarded supporting actor in films such as Chaw (2009) and Secret Reunion (2010), as well as the television series Behind the White Tower (2007), Secret Love Affair (2014) and The Producers (2015). Park also frequently stars in short films and independent films, notably in Milky Way Liberation Front (2007) and other works by Yoon Seong-ho.

== Filmography ==
=== Film ===
Year	Title	Role	Notes/Ref.
1998	Alex in Shinchon	Beom-seok	short film
2001	Déjà vu	Hyun/Sculptor	short film
2001	The Road to Samcheonpo		
2003	Desultory Empire	Soldier	short film
2004	Yohoho, Mr. Rabbit!	Sung-ho	short film
2004	Please Stay with Me	Seonbae	short film
2004	To Catch a Virgin Ghost	Ttaeng-joong	
2004	So Cute	Homeless man 3	
2005	Nothing's Gonna Stop Us Now		short film
2005	Save My Earth	Detective Seo	short film
2005	Mr. Housewife	Jin-soo	
2005	Princess Aurora	Squad captain	
2006	Running Wild	Detective colleague	
2006	Forbidden Quest	Sergeant Oh	
2006	Over the Border	Detective in charge of Lee Yeon-hwa	
2006	Don't Look Back	Police officer	
2006	Portfolio		short film
2007	A Good Day to Have an Affair	Small Bird's husband	
2007	Soo	Detective Jang	
2007	Boys of Tomorrow	Jong-dae's father/Young-soo	
2007	Once Again		short film
2007	Twins	Bong-nam	short film
2007	Milky Way Liberation Front	Hyuk-kwon	
2008	Open City	Kim Seon-cheol	
2008	In Joke		short film
2008	Shaggy-dog Story		short film
2008	Truly, Madly, Deeply	Police officer 1	short film
2008	Girl Scout	Beom-seok	
2008	Antique	Gay man in club	
2009	The Room Nearby	Lee Jae-woo	
2009	The Day After	Hyuk-kwon	
2009	Bandhobi	Ki-hong	
2009	Chaw	Detective Shin	
2009	The Rennin or Lenin	Bae Cho-rim	short film
2010	Secret Reunion	Ko Kyeong-nam	
2010	The Man Next Door	Kyung-ho	
2010	Read My Lips	Hyuk-kwon	
2010	Enlightenment Film	Kim Sung-ho	
2010	Villain and Widow	Manager Jo	cameo
2010	Family Plan	Dad	short film
2010	A Grave	Hyuk-kwon	short film
2011	Re-encounter	Jung-hun	
2011	The Last Blossom	Jung Yeon-soo's lover	
2011	If You Were Me 5	Hyuk-kwon	segment: "Nima"
2011	Dr. Jump	Jeon Young-rok	also credited as screenwriter
2011	The Client	Police inspector Seo	
2011	Laughing Guitar	Kim Woo-shin	
2012	R2B: Return to Base	Cheol-min	cameo
2012	Young Gun in Time	Middle-aged man	
2012	26 Years	Prosecutor Kang	cameo
2013	The Gifted Hands	Ki-woo	
2013	Shorts Meet Shorts	Jung-soo	segment: "The Body"
2013	A Hungry Woman	Ex-boyfriend Hyuk-kwon	cameo
2014	Another Promise	Park Jeong-hyeok	
2014	Obsessed	Colonel Choi	
2014	Night Flight	Big guy	
2015	Twenty	Film director	cameo
2015	Now Playing		
2015	A Break Alone		
2015	Girl on the Edge		Special appearance
2016	The Tunnel	Government official	cameo
2016	Proof of Innocence	Detective Yang	
2017	A Taxi Driver	Reporter Choi	
2017	Daddy You, Daughter Me	Jeong Byeong-jin	
2017	The Way		
2017	The Mayor	Gye Bong-sik	
2017	The Mimic	Min-ho	
2020	Secret Zoo	President Hwang	
2020	Mr. Zoo: The Missing VIP	Dr. Baek Hoon	
2022	The Girl on a Bulldozer	Bonjin	
2022	When Spring Comes	Jong-seong	
2022	The Contorted House		
2023	Unofficial Operation	Manager Park	

=== Television series ===
Key
†	Denotes television productions that have not yet been released

Year	Title	Role	Notes	Ref.
2004	You're Not Alone	Thomas	guest, episode 1	
2007	Behind the White Tower	Hong Sang-il		
2007	Time Between Dog and Wolf	NIS team leader		
2008	Drama City: "In the Name of the Father"	Jae-hyun		
2008	Painter of the Wind	Lee In-moon		
2009	The Return of Iljimae			
2011	Dream High	Go Byung-jik		
2011	My Princess	Lee Han		
2011	Midas	Jang Geun-ho		
2011	You're So Pretty		cameo	
2011	Deep Rooted Tree	Jeong In-ji		
2012	Read My Lips	Jeon Young-rok		
2012	How Long I've Kissed	Jo Hyun-tae		
2012	KBS Drama Special: "A Still Picture"	Joo Sung-tae		
2012	Only Because It's You	Chun Myung-hwan		
2012	The King's Doctor	Baek Seok-gu		
2013	The End of the World	Kim Hee-sang		
2013	Drama Festival: "The Marvelous Sunshine Funeral Home for the Elderly"	Hae-sik		
2014	Three Days	Gu Ja-kwang		
2014	Secret Affair	Kang Joon-hyung		
2014	Lovers of Music	Managing director Wang		
2014	Plus Nine Boys	Fortune teller	cameo	
2014	Flirty Boy and Girl	Psychiatrist	cameo	
2014	Somesing	Himself		
2014	What's Eating Steven Yeun?	Manager		
2014	Punch	Jo Kang-jae		
2015	Unkind Ladies	Jung Goo-min		
2015	The Producers	Kim Tae-ho		
2015	Six Flying Dragons	Gil Tae-mi/Gil Sun-mi		
2017	Super Family	Na Cheon-il		
2017	Hit the Top	Director Park	cameo	
2018	Something in the Rain	Nam Ho-gyun		
2018	Where Stars Land	Mister Zhang		
2019	Nokdu Flower	Baek Ga		
2020	Extracurricular	Cho Jin-woo		
2021	JTBC Drama Festa: "Missing Child"	Jo Yoon-seok	one act-drama	
2021	Law School	Jin Hyeong-woo		
2021	Mine	Han Jin-ho		
2022	Reborn Rich	Oh Se-hyun		
2023	Behind Your Touch	Park Jong Bae		
2024	Light Shop	Seung-won		
2026	Between Steps	Lim Yong-seok		
2026	The Substitute †	Nam Dong-sik		

== Theater ==
- Subway Line 1
- Checkmate
- Carmen on Fire
- Seoul Notes

== Awards and nominations ==
Year	Award	Category	Nominated work	Result
2007	6th Mise-en-scène Short Film Festival	Special Jury Prize for Acting	Twins	Won
2010	15th Busan International Film Festival	Best Actor, Korean Cinema Today – Vision category	Read My Lips	Won
2014	3rd APAN Star Awards	Best Supporting Actor	Secret Love Affair	Nominated
2015	4th APAN Star Awards	Best Supporting Actor	Punch	Nominated
2015	23rd SBS Drama Awards	Special Award, Actor in a Serial Drama	Six Flying Dragons	Won
2017	1st The Seoul Awards	Best Supporting Actor (Film)	The Mimic	Nominated
2021	8th Wildflower Film Awards	Best Actor	Prayer	Nominated
2021	16th Seoul International Drama Awards	Best Actor	Missing Child	Won
