= Secret Affair (TV series) =

2014 South Korean television series

- Promotional poster
- Also known as: Secret Love Affair
- Genre: Romance; Melodrama
- Written by: Jung Sung-joo
- Directed by: Ahn Pan-seok
- Starring: Kim Hee-ae; Yoo Ah-in
- Theme music composer: Lee Nam-yeon
- Country of origin: South Korea
- Original language: Korean
- No. of episodes: 16

Production
- Executive producers: Park Joon-seo; Lee Dong-ik; Bae Ik-hyun; Jo Joon-hyeong
- Producer: Kim Eui-seok
- Cinematography: Kang Seun-gi
- Editor: Jo Eung-kyung
- Production companies: Future One; Drama House

Original release
- Network: JTBC
- Release: March 17 – May 13, 2014

Secret Affair (Korean: 밀회; RR: Milhoe) is a 2014 South Korean television series starring Kim Hee-ae and Yoo Ah-in. It aired on cable channel JTBC from March 17 to May 13, 2014, on Mondays and Tuesdays at 21:50 (KST) for 16 episodes.

A story about a married woman in her 40s who has an affair with a pianist in his 20s, the romance melodrama explores the struggle between attraction and societal expectation.

== Synopsis ==
Oh Hye-won (Kim Hee-ae) is a 40-year-old woman who feels that she's leading a fulfilling life. Elegant, sophisticated and excellent at dealing with people, she spares no effort in her quest for success as the director of planning for the Seohan Arts Foundation. But then she meets Lee Sun-jae (Yoo Ah-in), a 20-year-old genius pianist from an impoverished background, who is unaware of his ability and works as a quick delivery guy. Hye-won experiences for the first time what truly falling in love is like, and she and Sun-jae begin a passionate affair which they must keep secret because it threatens to unravel both their lives.

== Cast ==
=== Main ===
- Kim Hee-ae as Oh Hye-won, director of planning
- Yoo Ah-in as Lee Sun-jae
- Park Hyuk-kwon as Kang Joon-hyung, music professor

=== People of Seohan Arts Foundation ===
- Shim Hye-jin as Han Seong-sook, chairwoman of the foundation
- Kim Hye-eun as Seo Young-woo, president of the Seoul Arts Center
- Kim Yong-gun as Seo Pil-won

=== People around Sun-jae ===
- Kyung Soo-jin as Park Da-mi
- Choi Tae-hwan as Son Jang-ho
- Lee Kan-hee as Myung-hwa

=== People of Seohan School of Music ===
- Kim Chang-wan as Min Yong-ki
- Park Jong-hoon as Jo In-seo
- Shin Ji-ho as Ji Min-woo
- Jin Bora as Jung Yoo-ra
- Yang Min-young as Kim In-joo

=== Others ===
- Yoon Bok-in as Yoon Ji-soo
- Gil Hae-yeon as Ms. Baek
- Baek Ji-won as Wang Jeong-hee
- Jang So-yeon as Ahn Se-jin
- Jeong Eui-soon as Mi-soon
- Heo Jung-do as Im Jong-soo
- Kim Kwon as Shin Woo-sung
- Kim Shin-jae as Jang Shi-eun
- Seo Jeong-yeon as Korean-Chinese ajumma
- Choi Hyun-sook as Ok-jin
- Jang Hyun-sung as Kim In-kyum (guest appearance, episode 10–16)
- Lee Moo-saeng as Chief Lim

== Awards and nominations ==
Year	Award	Category	Recipient	Result
2014	50th Baeksang Arts Awards	Best Drama	Secret Affair	Nominated
2014	50th Baeksang Arts Awards	Best Director	Ahn Pan-seok	Won
2014	50th Baeksang Arts Awards	Best Actor	Yoo Ah-in	Nominated
2014	50th Baeksang Arts Awards	Best Screenplay	Jung Sung-joo	Won
2014	9th Seoul International Drama Awards	Best Actress	Kim Hee-ae	Won
2014	7th Korea Drama Awards	Best Drama	Secret Affair	Nominated
2014	7th Korea Drama Awards	Best Production Director	Ahn Pan-seok	Nominated
2014	7th Korea Drama Awards	Top Excellence Award, Actor	Yoo Ah-in	Nominated
2014	7th Korea Drama Awards	Top Excellence Award, Actress	Kim Hee-ae	Nominated
2014	7th Korea Drama Awards	Best Screenplay	Jung Sung-joo	Nominated
2014	3rd APAN Star Awards	Top Excellence Award, Actor in a Miniseries	Yoo Ah-in	Nominated
2014	3rd APAN Star Awards	Top Excellence Award, Actress in a Miniseries	Kim Hee-ae	Won
2014	3rd APAN Star Awards	Best Supporting Actor	Park Hyuk-kwon	Nominated
2014	3rd APAN Star Awards	Best Supporting Actress	Kim Hye-eun	Won
2014	3rd APAN Star Awards	Best Writer	Jung Sung-joo	Won
