= The Mimic (2017 film) =

- Theatrical release poster
- Hangul: 장산범
- RR: Jangsanbeom
- MR: Changsanbŏm
- Directed by: Huh Jung
- Written by: Huh Jung
- Produced by: Kim Mi-hee
- Starring: Yum Jung-ah; Park Hyuk-kwon; Heo Jin; Shin Rin-ah; Bang Yu-seol; Lee Jun-hyeok
- Cinematography: Kim Il-yeon
- Edited by: Jeong Byeong-jin; Steve M. Choe
- Music by: Lee Jin-hee; Kim Hong-jip
- Production company: Studio Dream Capture
- Distributed by: Next Entertainment World
- Release date: August 17, 2017
- Running time: 100 minutes
- Country: South Korea
- Language: Korean
- Box office: US$9.4 million

The Mimic (Korean: 장산범; RR: Jangsanbeom) is a 2017 South Korean horror film written and directed by Huh Jung, and starring Yum Jung-ah, Park Hyuk-kwon, Heo Jin, Shin Rin-ah, Bang Yu-seol and Lee Jun-hyeok. It was released on August 17, 2017.

== Plot ==
Hee-yeon, Min-ho, and their little daughter Joon-hee move to Mt. Jang with Joon-hee's grandmother, who is senile, hoping it will improve her condition and so Hee-yeon and Min-ho can heal, after their young son went missing five years ago. The grandmother hears her dead sister's voice calling her from the woods. Two children come in search of their dog, the one killed in the car accident from the beginning. The kids hear their dog barking and follow the sound to the brick wall. The girl is pulled through the hole in the wall by an unseen force but escapes.

The kids run to Hee-yeon and Min-ho for help. Hee-yeon encounters a little girl in the woods but is drawn away by the kids and her husband, who enters the hole and finds a bolted door. When he opens it, a mutilated woman falls through, dead. They report it to the police. That night, the mysterious girl appears at their door and Hee-yeon takes her in. The girl calls her "Mom", mimics Joon-hee's voice, and says her name is also Joon-hee. Hee-yeon discovers signs of abuse on the girl's body. Min-ho is unsettled by the girl and Hee-yeon's refusal to get over their son and move on. The police track down the man from the beginning, who now hears voices and has eye problems. He is killed by the entity. The detective discovers that Mt. Jang has many missing persons cases, all of whom reported hearing voices of dead loved ones before disappearing. He also finds an old photo from the 1980s, revealing a man with the same little girl Hee-yeon has taken in.

The grandmother covers the house's mirrors in tape, as that is how the entity comes through. She succumbs to her sister's voice and follows it to the cave behind the brick wall. Min-ho goes to search for her and disappears as well. Hee-yeon goes to their neighbor, a blind woman, for help. The woman explains that long ago, there was a shaman in these parts who had a little daughter, the same girl who came to Hee-yeon. The shaman, a social outcast, willingly served a malevolent spirit residing in Mount Jangsan called the Jangsan Tiger to gain power. The shaman would abuse his daughter and slowly became possessed by the entity. He sacrificed his own daughter to appease the tiger's spirit. Now cursed, both he and his daughter imitate voices to lure in victims and sacrifice them. The woman warns Hee-yeon not to trust the little girl, and that those who give in lose their eyesight.

Jangsanbum attacks Joon-hee; Jangsanbum's daughter saves her. Hee-yeon shuts Joon-hee in her room, warning her not to trust any voices and to call the detective if she does not return. Hee-yeon then asks Jangsanbum's daughter to guide her to Min-ho. In the cave, they are chased by Jangsanbum into an area full of mirrors. Hee-yeon is driven into panic by voices and almost gives in until Min-ho, now blind, breaks the largest mirror that Jangsanbum's spirit is in, destroying the spirit as well as the shaman. Hee-yeon, weakened by the little girl mimicking her missing son's voice, goes blind. At the cave opening, unable to resist her son's voice, Hee-yeon turns back, despite Min-ho begging her not to trust it and that it is not their son. She returns to the little girl and the two go back into the cave. Min-ho stumbles back outside and is found by the detective.

== Cast ==
=== Main ===
- Yum Jung-ah as Hee-yeon
- Park Hyuk-kwon as Min-ho

=== Supporting ===
- Heo Jin as Soon-ja
- Shin Rin-ah as Girl
- Bang Yu-seol as Joon-hee
- Lee Jun-hyeok as The Shaman
- Gil Hae-yeon as Kim Moo-nyeo
- Lee Yool as Detective Kim
- Lee Ju-won as Jeong-soo
- Park Soo-young as Min-ji
- Noh Susanna as Constable Min
- Jung Ji-hoon as Joon-seo
- Lee Chae-eun as Hyo-jeong
- Hwang Jae-won as Hyo-min
- Jang Liu as Ji-hye
- Jeon Hyeon-ah as Director Kim
- Lee Ja-ryeong as Woman
- Lee Dal as Police officer
- Joo Ji-hoon as Shabby boy
- Lee Sang-ok as Music therapist
- Lee Seong-bae as Veterinarian

=== Special appearances ===
- Im Jong-yun as Detective Park
- Lee Jang-won as Jangsan tiger (voice)
- Jung Joon-won as Soon-ja's older brother (voice)
- Kim Su-an as Soon-ja's older sister (voice)
- Jo Hyeon-im as Girl's mom (voice)

== Production ==
The plot is inspired by the South Korean urban legend of the Jangsan Tiger, a man-eating creature that roams around Jangsan, a mountain in the city of Busan. It is rumored to have sharp teeth and white fur and moves swiftly through mountains and lures people by making a sound that resembles a woman's wail.

== Release ==
The Mimic was released in South Korean cinemas on August 17, 2017. By August 26, the 10th day of its release, the film earned a total of US$$7.3 million from 1,035,308 admissions. It became the first South Korean horror film to have accrued more than a million viewers in four years, since 2013's Killer Toon.

According to The Mimic's distributor Next Entertainment World, the film was sold to 122 countries including South America, North America, Malaysia, Spain, France, Germany, Italy, Spain and the Philippines prior to the local release.

== Awards and nominations ==
Year	Award	Category	Nominee(s)	Result	Ref.
2017	1st The Seoul Awards	Best Supporting Actor	Park Hyuk-kwon	Nominated	
2017	54th Grand Bell Awards	Best Actress	Yum Jung-ah	Nominated	
2017	38th Blue Dragon Film Awards	Best Actress	Yum Jung-ah	Nominated	
2017	38th Blue Dragon Film Awards	Technical Award	Kim Seok-won & Moon Cheol-woo (Sound effects)	Nominated	
2018	27th Buil Film Awards	Best Actress	Yum Jung-ah	Nominated	
