= Seo Jeong-yeon =

South Korean actress (born 1975)

Seo Jung-yeon
- Born: September 23, 1975 (age 51); Yeoju, South Korea
- Occupation: Actress
- Years active: 1996–present
- Agent: KeyEast

Korean name
- Hangul: 서정연
- RR: Seo Jeongyeon
- MR: Sŏ Chŏngyŏn

Seo Jeong-yeon (Korean: 서정연; born September 23, 1975) is a South Korean actress. She has starred in television series such as Righteous Love (2014) and Descendants of the Sun (2016) and had supporting roles in dramas including Something in the Rain (2018) and supporting role in My Demon (2024)

== Filmography ==
=== Film ===
Year	Title	Role	Notes/Ref.
2016	In Between Seasons	Hee-yeong	
2017	Midnight Runners	Ki-joon's mother	Special appearance
2017	Mothers	Seo-yeong	
2018	Be with You	Seo-bin's mom	
2018	Adulthood	Oh Jum-hee	
2019	Juror 8	Byeon Sang-mi	
2023	Road to Boston	Suh Yun-bok's mother	Special appearance

=== Television series ===
Key
†	Denotes television productions that have not yet been released

Year	Title	Role	Notes/Ref.
2012	How Long I've Kissed	Kim Hyun-hee	
2014	Secret Affair	Korean-Chinese ajumma	
2014	Righteous Love	Kim Boon-ja	
2015	Heard It Through the Grapevine	Lee Seon-sook	
2015	She Was Pretty	Na Ji-seon	
2015	Bubble Gum	Aunt Gong-joo	
2016	Descendants of the Sun	Ha Ja-ae	
2016	Second to Last Love	Goo Tae-yeon	
2016	Love in the Moonlight	Queen Sun-won	
2017	Naked Fireman	Han Song-ja	
2017	Innocent Defendant	Kim Sun-hwa	
2017	Good Manager	Jo Min-yeong	
2017	The Lady in Dignity	Park Joo-mi	
2017	Live Up to Your Name	Jung Yi-yun	
2018	Something in the Rain	Jung Young-in	
2018	Come and Hug Me	Chae Ok-hee	
2018	Feel Good to Die	Ahn Seon-nyeo	
2019	One Spring Night	Wang Hye-jung	
2019	Melting Me Softly	Oh Young-seon	
2020	How Are U Bread	Writer Witch	
2020	The King: Eternal Monarch	Song Jung-hye	
2020	Was It Love?	Jennifer Song	
2020	Do You Like Brahms?	Cha Young-in	
2020	Run On	Coach Bang	Cameo (Episode 6–7)
2021	Mouse	Moo Chi's mother	Cameo (Episode 1)
2021	Nevertheless	Jae-on's mother	Cameo (Episode 6)
2021	High Class	Shim Ae-soon	
2021	Dali & Cocky Prince	So Geum-ja	
2021	Reflection of You	Goo Jeong-yeon	
2021–2022	Our Beloved Summer	Lee Yeon-ok	
2022	Forecasting Love and Weather	Seong Mi-jin	Cameo
2022	Shadow Detective	Oh Hye-seong	Season 1
2022	Reborn Rich	Han Kyung-hee	Cameo (episode 2,5)
2022–2023	The Interest of Love	Han Jeong-im	
2022–2023	Trolley	Hyun Yeo-jin	
2023	Castaway Diva	Song Ha-jeong / Yang Jae-kyung	
2023	My Demon	Shin Da-jeong	
2023	Payback: Money and Power	Eun Ji-hee	
2023–2024	Like Flowers in Sand	Chu Mi-sook	
2025	Good Boy	Jeong Mi-ja	
2025	You and Everything Else	Yoon Hyun-Sook	
2025	As You Stood By	Kim Mi-gyeong	
2026	Between Steps	Seo Mi-young	

== Awards and nominations ==
Name of the award ceremony, year presented, category, nominee of the award, and the result of the nomination
Award ceremony	Year	Category	Nominee / Work	Result	Ref.
APAN Star Awards	2018	Best Supporting Actress	Come and Hug Me	Nominated	
KBS Drama Awards	2016	Best Supporting Actress	Descendants of the Sun	Nominated	
KBS Drama Awards	2017	Best Supporting Actress	Good Manager; Naked Fireman	Nominated	
MBC Drama Awards	2018	Best Supporting Cast in Wednesday-Thursday Miniseries	Come and Hug Me	Nominated	
SBS Drama Awards	2023	Best Supporting Actress in a Miniseries Romance/Comedy Drama	My Demon and Trolley	Won	
The Seoul Awards	2017	Best Supporting Actress (Drama)	Innocent Defendant; The Lady in Dignity	Nominated	
