= Naked Fireman =

- Promotional poster
- Genre: Action
- Written by: Yoo Jeong-hee
- Directed by: Park Jin-seok
- Starring: Lee Joon-hyuk; Jung In-sun; Jo Hee-bong; Park Hoon; Seo Jeong-yeon; Lee Won-jong
- Theme music composer: Park Sung-jin
- Country of origin: South Korea
- Original language: Korean
- No. of episodes: 4

Production
- Executive producer: Lee Geon-joon
- Producers: Jo Woong; Lee Young-beom; Heo Geon
- Cinematography: Park Sung; Han Joo-yeol
- Editor: Kim Byung-rok
- Running time: 60 minutes
- Production companies: KBS Drama Production; Urban Works Media

Original release
- Network: KBS2
- Release: January 12 – January 19, 2017

Naked Fireman (Korean: 맨몸의 소방관; Hanja: 맨몸의 消防官; RR: Maenmomui sobanggwan) is a 2017 South Korean television series starring Lee Joon-hyuk, Jung In-sun, Jo Hee-bong, Park Hoon, Seo Jeong-yeon and Lee Won-jong. It aired on KBS2 on Wednesdays and Thursdays at 22:00 (KST) from January 12 to January 19, 2017 for 4 episodes.

== Cast ==
=== Main cast ===
- Lee Joon-hyuk as Kang Cheol-soo
  - Ahn Do-gyu as young Kang Cheol-soo
- Jung In-sun as Han Jin-ah
  - Lee Young-eun as young Han Jin-ah
- Jo Hee-bong as Kwon Jeong-nam
- Park Hoon as Oh Sung-jin
  - Ryu Ui-hyun as young Oh Sung-jin
- Seo Jeong-yeon as Han Song-ja
- Lee Won-jong as Jang Gwang-ho

=== 119 Emergency Center ===
- Kim Ji-hoon as Nam-il
- Park Ji-hoon as Dae-young
- Lee Do-gyeom as Joon-ho

=== Extended cast ===
- Gil Hae-yeon as Jeong-soon
- Lee Doo-seok as Seung-jae

=== Others ===
- Kim Soo-jin
- Han Gap-soo
- Lee Jeong-in
- Ryoo Eui-hyun
- Cha Myung-wook
- Gong Sang-ah
- Kim Nam-woo
- Park Eun-young
- Oh Soon-tae
- Kim Kwang-seop
- Joo Sung-hwan
- Kim Jae-cheol
- Seo Kwang-jae

== Ratings ==
In the table below, the blue numbers represent the lowest ratings and the red numbers represent the highest ratings.

Ep.	Broadcast date	Average audience share			
Ep.	Broadcast date	TNmS		AGB Nielsen	
Ep.	Broadcast date	Nationwide	Seoul	Nationwide	Seoul
1	January 12, 2017	3.9%	4.0%	4.1%	4.2%
2	January 18, 2017	3.5%	4.2%	3.6%	4.3%
3	January 18, 2017	3.6%	3.7%	4.1%	4.2%
4	January 19, 2017	4.5%	5.3%	5.2%	6.0%
Average		3.88%	4.30%	4.25%	4.68%

== Awards and nominations ==
Year	Award	Category	Nominee	Result
2017	KBS Drama Awards	Best Supporting Actor	Jo Hee-bong	Nominated
2017	KBS Drama Awards	Best Supporting Actress	Seo Jeong-yeon	Nominated
