= How Long I've Kissed =

2012 South Korean television series

- Promotional poster
- Hangul: 아내의 자격
- RR: Anaeui jagyeok
- MR: Anaeŭi chagyŏk
- Genre: Drama; Romance
- Written by: Jung Sung-joo
- Directed by: Ahn Pan-seok
- Starring: Kim Hee-ae; Lee Sung-jae; Lee Tae-ran; Jang Hyun-sung
- Music by: Lee Nam-yeon
- Country of origin: South Korea
- Original language: Korean
- No. of episodes: 16

Production
- Executive producer: Kim Myung-hwan
- Running time: 70 minutes
- Production company: Drama House

Original release
- Network: JTBC
- Release: February 29 – April 19, 2012

How Long I've Kissed (Korean: 아내의 자격; RR: Anaeeui Jagyeok; lit. 'A Wife's Credentials') is a 2012 South Korean television series starring Kim Hee-ae, Lee Sung-jae, Lee Tae-ran and Jang Hyun-sung. It aired on JTBC from February 29 to April 19, 2012.

== Synopsis ==
The story of a struggling housewife who starts having an affair with her younger neighbor.

== Cast ==
=== Main ===
- Kim Hee-ae as Yoon Seo-rae
- Lee Sung-jae as Kim Tae-oh
- Lee Tae-ran as Hong Ji-sun
- Jang Hyun-sung as Han Sang-jin

=== Supporting ===
- Im Je-noh as Han-gyul
- Lee Jung-gil as Han Yong-hee
- Nam Yoon-jung as Jin Soo-ae
- Choi Eun-kyung as Han Myung-jin
- Park Hyuk-kwon as Jo Hyun-tae
- Lee Han-na as Jo Yoon-jae
- Lami as Jo Yoon-min
- Nam Neung-mi as Oh Jung-ae
- Jang So-yeon as Yoon Mi-rae
- Choi Da-in as Kim Bo-reum
- Lim Sung-min as Kang Eun-joo
- Castle J as Jo Jae-hoon
- Jung Han-yong as Jo Seok-ho
- Gil Hae-yeon as Ha Seom-jin
- Yook Mi-ra as Sung In-ok
- Hong Sung-sook as Min Hae-kyung
- Park Geun-hyung as Oh Young-sook
- Lee Sun-young as Lim Jung-ah
- Kim Shi-young as Cha Seung-hye
- Seo Jeong-yeon as Kim Hyun-hee

== Ratings ==
In this table, the blue numbers represent the lowest ratings and the red numbers represent the highest ratings.

Ep.	Original broadcast date	Average audience share (AGB Nielsen)
Ep.	Original broadcast date	Nationwide
1	February 29, 2012	1.070%
2	March 1, 2012	1.259%
3	March 7, 2012	1.420%
4	March 8, 2012	1.324%
5	March 14, 2012	1.624%
6	March 15, 2012	1.612%
7	March 21, 2012	1.580%
8	March 22, 2012	2.158%
9	March 28, 2012	2.011%
10	March 29, 2012	2.407%
11	April 4, 2012	2.843%
12	April 5, 2012	2.653%
13	April 11, 2012	2.525%
14	April 12, 2012	2.443%
15	April 18, 2012	2.602%
16	April 19, 2012	3.414%
Average		2.059%

- This drama airs on a cable channel/pay TV which normally has a relatively smaller audience compared to free-to-air TV/public broadcasters (KBS, SBS, MBC and EBS).

== Awards and nominations ==
Year	Award	Category	Recipient	Result
2013	49th Baeksang Arts Awards	Best Drama	How Long I've Kissed	Nominated
2013	49th Baeksang Arts Awards	Best Actress	Kim Hee-ae	Won
