= Over the Border (2006 film) =

- Theatrical poster
- Directed by: Ahn Pan-seok
- Written by: Jeong Yoo-kyeong
- Produced by: Cha Seung-jae; Kim Mi-hee; Oh Jin-seop; Kim Mi-jin
- Starring: Cha Seung-won; Jo Yi-jin; Shim Hye-jin
- Cinematography: Park Yong-su
- Edited by: Shin Min-kyung
- Music by: Han Jae-kwon
- Production company: Sidus FNH
- Distributed by: CJ Entertainment
- Release date: May 4, 2006
- Running time: 109 minutes
- Country: South Korea
- Language: Korean
- Budget: US$5 million
- Box office: US$1,199,122

Over the Border (Korean: 국경의 남쪽; RR: Gukgyeongui namjjok), also known as South of the Border, is a 2006 South Korean melodrama film. It is Ahn Pan-seok's feature film directorial debut.

== Plot ==
Kim Sun-ho is a horn player for the Mansoodae Art Company, Pyongyang's state orchestra. He comes from a well-to-do family in North Korea and is about to marry his sweetheart, War Memorial guide, Lee Yeon-Hwa. One day, Sun-ho's family receives a letter from his grandfather in Seoul, whom they had thought was dead. They begin to exchange letters, but when the authorities discover their correspondence, this puts the Kim family in grave danger. They decide to flee North Korea and defect to the South, where they are initially penniless and friendless. Devastated that he had to leave Yeon-Hwa behind, Sun-ho works hard to save enough money to help her escape North Korea and join him. But one day, news reaches him that Yeon-Hwa has married another man. Slowly he emerges from his heartbreak and despair to find a way to adapt to life in the South, and eventually marries a kind South Korean woman named Seo Kyung-Joo. But his peaceful life is again disrupted when he learns that Yeon-Hwa has defected to the South, and contrary to what he had heard, she isn't married at all.

== Cast ==
- Cha Seung-won as Kim Sun-ho
- Jo Yi-jin as Lee Yeon-Hwa
- Shim Hye-jin as Seo Kyung-Joo
- Song Jae-ho as Sun-ho's father
- Won Mi-won as Sun-ho's mother
- Yoo Hae-jin as Sun-ho's brother-in-law
- Lee Ah-hyun as Sun-ae
- Kim Cheol-Yong as Guide
- Jo Mun-Ui as Broker
- Lee Sang-Ju as Conductor
- Park Hyuk-kwon as Detective in charge of Yeon-Hwa
- Son Jin-ho as Photographer
- Boom as Reporter
- Choi Dae-Woong as Grandfather
- Yang Ji-Woong as Driver
- Gu Bon-Im as a Chinese restaurant owner
- Kim Sang-ho as Drunk (cameo)
- Son Beom-soo as Announcer (cameo)

== Awards and nominations ==
Year	Award	Category	Recipient	Result
2006	5th Korean Film Awards	Best New Actress	Jo Yi-jin	Nominated
2007	44th Grand Bell Awards	Best Supporting Actress	Shim Hye-jin	Won
2007	44th Grand Bell Awards	Best New Actress	Jo Yi-jin	Won
2007	44th Grand Bell Awards	Best Art Direction	Yang Hong-sam	Nominated
2007	44th Grand Bell Awards	Best Costume Design	Choi Seon-im	Nominated
