= Behind the White Tower =

2007 South Korean television series

- Also known as: White Tower; Great White Tower; Inside the White Tower
- Genre: Medical drama
- Based on: Shiroi Kyotō by Toyoko Yamasaki
- Written by: Lee Ki-won
- Directed by: Ahn Pan-seok
- Starring: Kim Myung-min; Lee Sun-kyun
- Music by: Lee Si-woo
- Country of origin: South Korea
- Original language: Korean
- No. of episodes: 20

Production
- Executive producer: Jo Joong-hyun
- Producer: Park Chang-shik
- Running time: 60 minutes
- Production company: Kim Jong-hak Production

Original release
- Network: MBC TV
- Release: January 6 – March 11, 2007

Related
- Shiroi Kyotō; The Hospital

Behind the White Tower (Korean: 하얀 거탑; RR: Hayan geotap; lit. White Tower) is a 2007 South Korean television series that aired on MBC from January 6 to March 11, 2007, on Saturdays and Sundays at 21:40 for 20 episodes.

Based on renowned Japanese novelist Toyoko Yamasaki's representative work Shiroi Kyotō, the drama brings viewers deep into the political inner workings of the medical field by taking a satirical look at malpractice and power plays at a university hospital, and contrasting the paths and personalities of two doctors played by Kim Myung-min and Lee Sun-kyun. The medical drama was a critical and ratings hit in South Korea, gaining praise for its acting (particularly by Kim), writing, direction, and its intelligent and uncompromising story without concessions to melodrama or romance.

== Plot ==
Brilliant and ambitious, assistant professor Jang Joon-hyuk (Kim Myung-min) is a rising star in the Myeongin University Hospital surgery department. His knowledge and expertise is undeniable, but his cavalier confidence and cold personality has earned him more than a few enemies, including the department head. While Jang's drive stems from a desire for success and advancement, fellow doctor Choi Do-young (Lee Sun-kyun) is committed to the well-being of his patients, leading to frequent clashes with the practices and personnel within the hospital. With the head of the surgery department retiring, Jang seems to be the clear successor until a new rival emerges in the form of Noh Min-guk (Cha In-pyo), who has the backing of the department head. Jang, however, is determined to win at all costs.

== Cast ==
- Kim Myung-min as Jang Joon-hyuk
- Lee Sun-kyun as Choi Do-young
- Cha In-pyo as Noh Min-guk
- Song Seon-mi as Lee Yoon-jin
- Kim Bo-kyung as Kang Hee-jae
- Lee Jung-gil as Lee Joo-wan
- Kim Chang-wan as Woo Yong-gil
- Byun Hee-bong as Oh Kyung-hwan
- Im Sung-eun as Min Soo-jung
- Jung Han-yong as Min Choong-shik
- Ki Tae-young as Yeom Dong-il
- Lee Seung-min as Ha Eun-hye
- Lee Hee-do as Yoo Pil-sang
- Han Sang-jin as Park Geon-ha
- Kim Yong-min as Ham Min-seung
- Park Kwang-jung as Park Chang-shik
- Jung Young-ook as Joon-hyuk's mother
- Jang So-yeon as Yoo Mi-ra
- Lee Moo-saeng as Kwon Hyung-jin
- Nam Yoon-jung as Kim Young-ah
- Yang Hee-kyung as Hong Sung-hee
- Son Byong-ho as Kim Hoon
- Park Hyuk-kwon as Hong Sang-il
- Kim Do-yeon as Lee Young-soon
- Jang Hyun-sung as Jo Myung-joon
- Park Young-ji as Oh Nam-ki
- Jung Kyung-ho as Kwon Soon-ki
- Kim Jung-hak as Lee Jae-myung
- Lee Ji-eun as Lee Jin-joo
- Shin Kwi-shik as Won Yong-min
- Choi Beom-ho as Kwon Soon-il

== Awards and nominations ==
Year	Award	Category	Recipient	Result
2007	43rd Baeksang Arts Awards	Best TV Drama	White Tower	Nominated
2007	43rd Baeksang Arts Awards	Best Director (TV)	Ahn Pan-seok	Won
2007	43rd Baeksang Arts Awards	Best Actor (TV)	Kim Myung-min	Won
2007	43rd Baeksang Arts Awards	Best New Actor (TV)	Lee Sun-kyun	Nominated
2007	20th Grimae Awards	Best Actor	Kim Myung-min	Won
2007	MBC Drama Awards	Top Excellence Award, Actor	Kim Myung-min	Won
2007	MBC Drama Awards	Golden Acting Award, Actor in a Miniseries	Lee Sun-kyun	Won
2007	MBC Drama Awards	PD Award	Kim Chang-wan	Won
2007	MBC Drama Awards	Popularity Award, Actor	Kim Myung-min	Nominated
2007	MBC Drama Awards	Viewer's Favorite Drama of the Year	White Tower	Nominated
2008	20th Producer's Awards of Korea	Best Performer	Kim Myung-min	Won
