= Something in the Rain =

2018 South Korean television series

- Promotional poster
- Also known as: Pretty Sister Who Buys Me Food; Pretty Sister Who Treats Me to Meals
- Hangul: 밥 잘 사주는 예쁜 누나
- Lit.: Pretty Sister Who Buys Me Food
- RR: Bap jal sajuneun yeppeun nuna
- MR: Pap chal sajunŭn yeppŭn nuna
- Genre: Romance
- Created by: JTBC
- Written by: Kim Eun
- Directed by: Ahn Pan-seok
- Starring: Son Ye-jin; Jung Hae-in
- Music by: Lee Nam-yoon
- Country of origin: South Korea
- Original language: Korean
- No. of episodes: 16

Production
- Executive producers: Choi Kwan-yong; Ma Jung-hoon; Park Joon-seo
- Camera setup: Single-camera
- Running time: 70-90 minutes
- Production companies: Drama House; Content K

Original release
- Network: JTBC
- Release: March 30 – May 19, 2018

Something in the Rain (Korean: 밥 잘 사주는 예쁜 누나) is a 2018 South Korean television series directed by Ahn Pan-seok and written by Kim Eun. It stars Son Ye-jin and Jung Hae-in. The series marks Son Ye-jin's small screen comeback after a five-year break. It aired on JTBC from March 30 to May 19, 2018, every Friday and Saturday at 23:00 (KST).

It became available for streaming on Netflix in April 2018, and on Disney+ in Japan in February 2022.

== Synopsis ==
The series explores the relationship of two people as they go from being "just acquaintances" to "a genuine couple." Jin-ah (Son Ye-jin) is a district supervisor in her 30s at the coffeehouse franchise Coffee Bay (an actual Korean chain) and Jun-hui (Jung Hae-in) is an animator in his late 20s at video game developer Smilegate Entertainment. When he returns from working abroad, he reconnects with Jin-ah — who also happens to be best friends with Jun-hui's sister since childhood. The episodes give an intimate look into how they fall in love, struggle with their age differences (considered to be taboo in some circles), and find the courage to go public with their relationship to everyone around them.

The series also contains a secondary storyline about the struggles that female employees face in the company where Jin-ah works, as they try to climb the corporate ladder amidst sexual harassment, mistreatment, discrimination, and career sabotage from their male managers – all part of an unspoken culture of sexism considered to be normal among South Korean companies.

== Cast ==
=== Main ===
- Son Ye-jin as Yoon Jin-ah, a single woman, age 35, (Note: The age stated is their Korean age which is typically one year more than their international age. In South Korea, people are born at age one and one year is added to their age on New Year's Day.) who works as a store supervisor in a coffee franchise. Despite being an easygoing person, she lives a rather hollow life. After being dumped by her boyfriend, she suddenly develops romantic feelings towards her best friend's younger brother Jun-hui.
- Jung Hae-in as Seo Jun-hui, Gyeong-seon's younger brother, age 29, who works as a character animation designer at a video game company. He recently returned to the country after working abroad in the USA for three years. While getting reacquainted with his older sister's best friend Jin-ah, he helps her get out of a few difficult situations and begins to fall in love with her.
- Jang So-yeon as Seo Gyeong-seon, Jun-hui's older sister and Jin-ah's best friend, age 35, who runs a coffee shop under the same franchise where Jin-ah works.

=== Supporting ===
==== Employees at Coffee Bay ====
- Jung Yoo-jin as Kang Se-young, the most popular and ambitious of Jin-ah's colleagues. She requests to supervise Kyung-seon's store because she has a crush on Jun-hui.
- Joo Min-kyung as Geum Bo-ra, a veteran colleague that Jin-ah can confide in.
- Lee Joo-young as Lee Ye-eun, Jin-ah's youngest colleague.
- Jang Won-hyung as Kim Dong-woo
- Lee Hwa-ryong as Gong Cheol-goo, a deputy chief who manages Jin-ah and other store supervisors. He is unpopular among his female subordinates due to his behavior.
- Seo Jeong-yeon as Jung Young-in, vice president and marketing director of the coffee franchise.
- Lee Chang-hoon as Choi Joong-mo, a deputy chief.
- Park Hyuk-kwon as Nam Ho-gyun, vice president and director of the coffee franchise, whom Gong Cheol-goo reports to.
- Kim Jong-tae as Jo Kyung-sik, CEO of the coffee franchise.

==== Yoon Jin-ah's family ====
- Wi Ha-joon as Yoon Seoung-ho, Jin-ah's younger brother and Jun-hui's best friend.
- Gil Hae-yeon as Kim Mi-yeon, Jin-ah's mother, who is obsessed with finding Jin-ah a husband from a well-respected family.
- Oh Man-suk as Yoon Sang-ki, Jin-ah's father.

==== Others ====
- Oh Ryong as Lee Gyu-min, Jin-ah's ex-boyfriend, a lawyer from a well-respected family. He cheated on Jin-ah with a younger woman.
- Yoon Jong-suk as Kim Seung-chul, Jun-hui's colleague and university friend.

=== Special appearances ===
- Ji Hye-ran as Gyu-min's new girlfriend (Ep. 1)
- Cho Soo-hyang as Jun-hui's friend (Ep. 6)
- Chang Ryul as Customer
- Oh Hee-joon as Jun-hui's friend
- Lee Kyu-sung as Jun-hui's friend
- Kim Chang-wan as Jun-hui and Gyeong-seon's father

== Episodes ==
No.	Title	Original release date	South Korea viewers (millions)
1	"Episode 1"	March 30, 2018	
Yoon Jin-ah finds her job tough at the office and has experienced a difficult breakup. After spending three years working in the United States, Seo Jun-Hui, the brother of Seo Gyeong-seon, returns home to Seoul, South Korea. Suddenly, Jin-Ah and Jun-Hui meet. Jin-Ah and Jun-Hui work in the same office complex. One of the new coffee shops that Jin-Ah oversees is giving her some trouble. Jin-Ah discovers the cause of her boyfriend's split. She discovered her partner, Lee Gyu-min was having an affair with a younger woman. She intends to exact revenge for this deceit. She goes back to her workplace after exacting her retribution. Lee Gyu-min, who was dumped by the new girl, visits her office. He starts a commotion outside Jin-Ah's workspace. As Jun-Hui gets to the scene, he poses as Jin-Ah's new boyfriend in order to assist her. Jin-Ah's bosses harass her later on during a team dinner when her coworkers invite her to join them for a drink. All of Jin-Ah's female coworkers depart after the meal, with the exception of Lee Ye-eun, the newest member of her team. Jin-Ah departs to work from her office, leaving Lee Ye-eun alone herself. Lee Ye-eun is harassed and forcibly brought to Karaoke by Jin-Ah's bosses. Jin-Ah tries to work in her workplace when Jun-Hui shows up.
2	"Episode 2"	March 31, 2018	
Jun-Hui meets Jin-Ah at her job and assists her with her duties after arriving. Unexpectedly, Lee Ye-eun shows up at work drunk as well. In Jin-Ah's office, Jun-Hui hides. Yoon Jin-Ah is informed by Lee Ye-eun that she found her supervisor's constant inappropriate touching to be annoying. She adds that she thinks Jin-Ah is the most admirable person in the office. Lee Ye-eun is eventually sent back to her house by Jin-Ah. Jun-Hui and Jin-Ah both eventually quit the office. The boss of Jin-Ah was upset with all of the female coworkers the following day for their disappearance the previous evening and reprimanded them. Jun-hui is liked by one of Jin-Ah's coworkers, Kang Se-Yeong, which irritates her. Because Jin-Ah isn't getting ready for marriage like other ladies her age, Jin-Ah's mother starts to worry. Once more, Jin-Ah's former partner comes up and asks her out to dinner, inquiring as to why they broke up. Jin-Ah expresses to him her feelings for him. The owner of the coffee shop wasn't available, so Jin-Ah's managers asked her to go directly the following day and supervise work at one of the coffee shops. Jin-Ah returns to her office at the end of the day and meets Jun-Hui there. They both head out to eat. Without telling Jin-Ah, her parents phone Lee Gyu-min the following day and extend an invitation to supper. Jin-Ah is shocked to find her ex eating dinner with her parents when she gets home later that day. Jin-Ah asks her mother if her father has ever cheated on her after a while, after the supper, when everyone is intoxicated. She goes on to say that Lee Gyu-min was seeing other women. When Jin-Ah's parents learned of this, they were shocked. Jun-Hui and Jin-Ah's brother, who is also Jun-Hui's buddy, arrive at the same moment. Jun-Hui and Jin-Ah's brother lead Lee Gyu-min outside and advise him to get over it.
3	"Episode 3"	April 6, 2018	
Gyu-min makes an effort to persuade people of Jin-Ah's affections for Jun-hui. In an attempt to set the record straight, Jin-Ah claims that she lied about her affections for Jun-Hui after Gyu-min departs from her house. After hearing this, Jun-Hui becomes irate and departs as well. Jin-Ah's mother eventually yells at her for not making amends with Gyu-min. Given Gyu-min's wealthy background, she still desires for her to wed him. After a while, Jin-Ah visits Jun-Hui's apartment but can't find him; instead, she runs into Seo Gyeong-seon, her friend. Jin-Ah and Jun-Hui meet the following day. Jun-hui encourages Jin-Ah to stop being a pushover because he believes she still has affections for Gyu-min. In the meantime, Kang Se-Yeong visits Seo Gyeong-seon's Coffee Store, which is under her supervision, in order to learn more about Jun-Hui. Suddenly, Gyu-min shows up in the coffee shop and begins to eat lunch with Seo Gyeong-seon. Gyu-min tries to explain to Seo Gyeong-seo that Jin-Ah has feelings for Jun-Hui, but she doesn't trust him because she doesn't know about this. When Jin-Ah gets there, he speaks with Gyu-min. When he doesn't listen, Jin-Ah smacks him after telling him she doesn't want him around anymore. Jun-Hui and Jin-Ah's coworkers go out to clubs. The following day, at Seo Gyeong-seo's apartment, Seo Gyeong-seon and Jun-Hui host a memorial service for their mother. Calling Seo Gyeong-seon, Jin-Ah informs her that she has made the decision to let go of Gyu-min. Jun-Hui and Jin-Ah eventually cross paths, and they decide to see a late-night film together. After drawing an image of her, Jun-Hui eventually delivers her to her house. The following day, Jin-Ah talks about relationships with Lee Ye-eun. Jun-Hui attempts, but is reluctant, to tell Jin-Ah how he feels. Later that evening, Jun-Hui, Jin-Ah, and Kang Se-Yeong go to dinner. It is during this conversation that Jun-Hui's coworkers bring up Jun-Hui's dating history, which makes Jun-Hui uneasy. Jin-Ah chooses to grasp Jun-Hui's hand after realizing she feels something for him as well.
4	"Episode 4"	April 7, 2018	
Although happy with her relationship, Jin-Ah still has concerns about it. At work she gets tricked into going on a business trip that no one else wants to take on.
5	"Episode 5"	April 13, 2018	
Setting aside her guilt, Jin-Ah spends the night at Jun-Hui's place. Back at work after the business trip, she gets called to director Nam's office.
6	"Episode 6"	April 14, 2018	
Jin-Ah and Joon Hee struggle to hide their relationship from friends and family.
7	"Episode 7"	April 20, 2018	
Jin Ah wonders how she can tell her family that she's dating Joon Hee. Meanwhile, her ex just can't seem to let her go.
8	"Episode 8"	April 21, 2018	
The ex-boyfriend of Jin Ah commits the unimaginable. He asks Jin-Ah to ride along in his automobile under false pretenses before accelerating to a very high speed. He expresses to Jin-Ah his desire to pass away with her. On the other end, Jun-hui is making a lot of effort to contact Jin-Ah but is unable to do so. With the assistance of Jin-Ah's brother, he is able to obtain Gyu-min's phone number and makes a call to him. Gyu-min refused to listen to Jin-ah's request for him to pick up his phone. Eventually, Jin-Ah, Gyu-min, manages to pick up his phone. Jin-Ah seizes the opportunity to direct the vehicle, and it strikes the crossroads crash barrier. Jin-Ah has an injury.When the police come, Jin-Ah is asked to go to the hospital. Jin-Ah uses a police officer's phone to tell Jun-hui about her accident. Hurrying over to the hospital is Jun-hui. There, he discovers Jin-Ah. Jin-Ah lets her mother know that she won't be coming home; she will be remaining at the office. Upon her release from the hospital, Jin-Ah and Jun-hui visit Jun-hui's residence. The CEO of Jin-Ah's employer questions one of Jin-Ah's female supervisors about the employee satisfaction survey the following day at work. She does, however, note that all of the female staff members are a little apprehensive, don't want to write about it, and won't be attending the all-female team dinner. As the episode comes to a close, Jin-Ah makes the decision to tell her parents about her relationship with Jun-hui. Meanwhile, Gyeong-Seon finds sketches of Jin-Ah made by Jun-hui in his sketchbook at his apartment.
9	"Episode 9"	April 27, 2018	
The truth about Jin Ah and Joon Hee's relationship is finally out. Will Jin Ah's friendship with Joon Hee's sister survive?
10	"Episode 10"	April 28, 2018	
Jin Ah's mother doesn't take the news of her daughter's relationship too well.
11	"Episode 11"	May 4, 2018	
Joon Hee and Jin Ah's relationship is put to the test.
12	"Episode 12"	May 5, 2018	
Jin Ah and Joon Hee struggle to appease Jin Ah's mother. Kyung Sun sees her father for the first time in years.
13	"Episode 13"	May 11, 2018	
Joon Hee and Kyung Sun's father tries to learn more about his kids' lives.
14	"Episode 14"	May 12, 2018	
As Jin Ah's company is embroiled in scandal, Joon Hee asks Jin Ah to make a big decision.
15	"Episode 15"	May 18, 2018	
Yoon Jin Ah makes a drastic decision.
16	"Episode 16"	May 19, 2018	
Joon Hee and Jin Ah meet again. Can they rekindle their relationship?

== Production ==
In August 2017, it was announced that Ahn Pan-seok was on board to direct Something in the Rain (aka Pretty Sister Who Buys Me Food).

In January 2018, Son Ye-jin joined the production, marking her return to the small screen after a five-year break. Also in the same month, it was reported that Jung Hae-in had joined the cast.

The first script reading was held on January 25, 2018, at the JTBC building in Sangam-dong.

As a result of the drama's commercial success, a three-day vacation to Japan was awarded to the cast and crew, which was scheduled from May 29–31, 2018.

=== Themes of taboos ===
The driving narrative within the story centers around South Korean taboos concerning relationships:

- Dating Taboos: An older female dating a younger male is considered scandalous.
- Familial Taboos: People who grow up without parents or have no parental figures in their lives are considered "unfit" for marriage.
- Job Taboos: People should only associate with those of a certain educational background, occupational position, or wealthy class status.
- Career Taboos: Women are expected to endure sexual harassment without complaint during team dinners to show they value "team unity".
- Drinking Taboos: It is customary to pour your colleague's glass first before and vice versa. If you pour for yourself, it indicates a fractured relationship.
- Food Taboos: Usually if an older woman frequently buys a younger male food, it indicates a brother-sister relationship.

== Broadcast ==
JTBC announced that after the first episode's premiere at 22:45 (KST) on Friday, March 30, 2018, the rest of the series would air at 23:00 (KST) on Friday–Saturday.

International Broadcast

In India, the South Korean drama Something in the Rain officially released with a Hindi dubbed version on the streaming platform MX Player on April 24, 2025.

== Original soundtrack ==
Something in the Rain OST

Soundtrack album by Various artists
- Genre: Soundtrack
- Languages: Korean, English
- Labels: Sony Music; Drama House

"Stand by Your Man", and "Save the Last Dance for Me" are played frequently throughout the series.

=== Part 1 ===
Released on April 13, 2018
No.	Title	Lyrics	Music	Artist	Length
1.	"Something in the Rain"	Rachael Yamagata	Lee Nam-yeon (이남연)	Rachael Yamagata	4:56

=== Part 2 ===
Released on April 20, 2018
No.	Title	Lyrics	Music	Artist	Length
1.	"La La La"	Lee Nam-yeon (이남연)	Lee Nam-yeon (이남연)	Rachael Yamagata	3:40

== Additional Soundtrack ==
Released on June 28, 2011
No.	Title	Artist	Length
1.	"내가 제일 잘 나가(I AM THE BEST)"	2NE1	3:34

== Reception ==
The on-screen chemistry between Son and Jung led to their being nicknamed "the next Song-Song couple" (reminiscent of the couple in the 2016 major hit drama series Descendants of the Sun).

Something in the Rain became the most talked-about Korean drama of 2018.

=== Awards and nominations ===
Year	Award	Category	Recipient	Result	Ref.
2018	Korea Drama Awards	Best New Actor	Wi Ha-joon	Nominated	
2018	Seoul International Drama Awards	Excellence Award for Korean Drama	Something in the Rain	Won	
2018	Seoul International Drama Awards	Outstanding Korean Actress	Son Ye-jin	Won	
2018	APAN Star Awards	Grand Prize (Daesang)	Son Ye-jin	Nominated	
2018	APAN Star Awards	Excellence Award, Actor in a Miniseries	Jung Hae-in	Won	
2018	APAN Star Awards	Best Supporting Actress	Jang So-yeon	Won	
2018	APAN Star Awards	K-Star Award, Actor	Jung Hae-in	Won	
2018	The Seoul Awards	Best Actress	Son Ye-jin	Nominated	
2018	The Seoul Awards	Best New Actor	Jung Hae-in	Nominated	
2018	The Seoul Awards	Popularity Award, Actor	Jung Hae-in	Won	
2018	The Seoul Awards	Hallyu Artist Award	Jung Hae-in	Won	
2018	Korea Contents Awards	Presidential Commendation	Something in the Rain	Won	
2019	Asian Television Awards	Best Drama Series	Something in the Rain	Won	
2019	Asian Television Awards	Best Director	Ahn Pan-seok	Nominated	
2019	Asian Television Awards	Best Actress	Son Ye-jin	Nominated	

=== Viewership ===
Something in the Rain : South Korea viewers per episode (millions)

Season	Episode number																Average
Season	1	2	3	4	5	6	7	8	9	10	11	12	13	14	15	16	Average
1	0.831	0.813	0.890	1.133	1.210	1.370	1.281	1.171	1.487	1.389	1.166	1.242	1.141	1.682	1.292	1.600	1.231

Source: Audience measurement performed nationwide by Nielsen Korea.

Average TV viewership ratings
Ep.	Original broadcast date	Average audience share		
Ep.	Original broadcast date	Nielsen Korea		TNmS
Ep.	Original broadcast date	Nationwide	Seoul	Nationwide
1	March 30, 2018	4.008%	4.239%	3.8%
2	March 31, 2018	3.752%	4.177%	4.8%
3	April 6, 2018	4.222%	4.621%	4.4%
4	April 7, 2018	4.756%	5.434%	5.9%
5	April 13, 2018	5.134%	6.001%	5.4%
6	April 14, 2018	6.187%	7.069%	6.5%
7	April 20, 2018	5.322%	6.202%	6.4%
8	April 21, 2018	5.499%	5.936%	5.7%
9	April 27, 2018	6.177%	6.769%	5.9%
10	April 28, 2018	5.757%	6.713%	6.6%
11	May 4, 2018	5.637%	7.018%	5.9%
12	May 5, 2018	5.520%	6.320%	6.1%
13	May 11, 2018	5.564%	6.598%	5.4%
14	May 12, 2018	7.281%	8.313%	6.3%
15	May 18, 2018	5.883%	6.486%	5.7%
16	May 19, 2018	6.787%	7.661%	7.1%
Average		5.468%	6.222%	5.7%
In the table above, the blue numbers represent the lowest ratings and the red numbers represent the highest ratings.; This series aired on a cable channel/pay TV which normally has a relatively smaller audience compared to free-to-air TV/public broadcasters (KBS, SBS, MBC and EBS).

== Remake ==
In February 2022, it was confirmed that Something in the Rain is set for an Indian official remake produced jointly by JTBC Studios and Indian media company Pocket Aces Pictures Pvt. Ltd. On 23 May 2026, the remake titled Shayad Yahi Hai Pyaar was announced featuring Aditi Dev Sharma and Daksh Puri in leading roles which premiered on 28 September 2026 on Colors TV and Jiohotstar

On March 3, 2022, it was announced that iQIYI would release a Chinese remake of the series titled The Way Love Should Be, starring Angelababy. The platform also gained the rights to exclusively air the show in China, making it the first South Korean TV show to be approved for streaming in the country since the Korean content ban.
