= Ahn Pan-seok =

South Korean director (1961–2026)

Ahn Pan Suk
- Born: 27 November 1961; Uiryeong, South Korea
- Died: 12 August 2026 (aged 64)
- Education: Sejong University
- Occupations: Television and film director
- Years active: 1987–2026
- Spouse: Yoon Sook Kim

Korean name
- Hangul: 안판석
- Hanja: 安判碩
- RR: An Panseok
- MR: An P'ansŏk

Ahn Pan Suk (27 November 1961 – 12 August 2026) was a South Korean television director. He directed the Korean dramas Something In The Rain (2018), Roses and Bean Sprouts (1999), Ajumma (2000), Behind the White Tower (2007), How Long I've Kissed (2012), Secret Affair (2014), and Heard It Through the Grapevine (2015). He also directed the film Over the Border (2006).

== Life and career ==
Ahn Pan Suk was born in Uiryeong on 27 November 1961. He graduated from Sejong University with a degree in English Language and Literature. In 1986, he and fellow cinephiles from Sejong collaborated on the 22-minute short film In Praise of Idleness; the crew consisted of Yoo Ha as the director, Kim Sung-su as cinematographer, Ahn handled the lighting, and poet Jin Yi-jeong wrote the screenplay.

He was hired by MBC's drama production division in 1987, then worked as an assistant director on Humble Men in 1991 and My Mother's Sea in 1993. He made his directorial debut in 1994 with Love Greetings, part of the single-episode anthology MBC Best Theater; he would go on to direct eight Best Theater episodes throughout the 1990s.

His first series as a production director (or "PD") was the weekend morning drama Partner (1994–1998), which was followed by the popular family dramas Roses and Bean Sprouts (1999) and Ajumma (2000–2001), and the romantic comedy I Love You, Hyun-jung (2002). He resigned from MBC in 2003 and became a freelancer, working on A Problem at My Younger Brother's House for SBS.

After 15 years in television, Ahn directed his first film in 2006. Over the Border (titled South of the Border in Korean) was a melodrama starring Cha Seung-won as an orchestra horn player from Pyongyang who defects, then later re-encounters his North Korean sweetheart (Jo Yi-jin) but he's already married to a South Korean wife (Shim Hye-jin). Ahn said, "Our society has greatly matured―enough not to ban the use of the North Korean flag or portraits of Kim Il Sung in movies. The audience should have fun watching images of a North Korea they've only heard about." Over the Border received good reviews, but was unsuccessful at the box office.

Back on the small screen in 2007, Ahn next chose a Korean TV adaptation of the Japanese novel Shiroi Kyotō by Toyoko Yamasaki, which had previously been adapted into a well-regarded Japanese film and two Japanese television dramas. Unlike typical contemporary Korean dramas, Ahn's medical drama Behind the White Tower eschewed any romance elements, focusing instead on the hospital politics and power struggles surrounding an ambitious and brilliant surgeon played by Kim Myung-min. White Tower drew high ratings and critical acclaim, and Ahn won Best Television Director at the Baeksang Arts Awards. In May 2007, he became the co-CEO of JoongAng Media Network's then-newly-launched production company Drama House.

One of the inaugural dramas of newly launched cable channel jTBC was Ahn's How Long I've Kissed in 2012. Kim Hee-ae played the protagonist, a middle-aged housewife who struggles with the unforgiving expectations of her husband (Jang Hyun-sung) and his status-obsessed family, then finds a kindred spirit in her son's dentist (Lee Sung-jae). Praised for its richly drawn characters and the realistic depiction of affluent Korean parents' obsession with their children's academic achievements, the show was a hit, reaching 4% viewership ratings.

In 2013, Ahn directed The End of the World based on Bae Young-ik's novel Infectious Disease, about a Center of Disease Control and Prevention scientist (played by Yoon Je-moon) who works to figure out a mysterious pandemic threatening mankind. Despite critical raves, the show's low ratings led to jTBC drastically reducing its episodes from 20 to 12.

Ahn reunited with How Long I've Kissed screenwriter Jung Sung-joo and lead actress Kim Hee-ae in 2014 with Secret Affair. Kim played an art foundation director who embarks on a passionate affair with a poor but talented pianist 20 years her junior (played by Yoo Ah-in), and the series also explored the hypocrisy and corruption amid the ranks of upper-class intellectuals. Ahn, Jung and the cast again received accolades, which included a second win for Best Television Director at the Baeksang Arts Awards.

He returned to network TV in 2015 with Heard It Through the Grapevine, a black comedy dissecting the class divide as the teenage son of a wealthy, powerful family brings home his pregnant girlfriend (played by Lee Joon and Go Ah-sung).

Ahn died of a brain hemorrhage on 12 August 2026, at the age of 64.

== Filmography ==
=== Television ===
- Humble Men (MBC, 1991) – assistant director
- My Mother's Sea (MBC, 1993) – assistant director
- MBC Best Theater "Love Greetings" (MBC, 1994)
- MBC Best Theater "To Mr. Lee Jong-beom" (MBC, 1994)
- MBC Best Theater "He Lives in Nokcheon" (MBC, 1994)
- MBC Best Theater "Did Mom Love That Person?" (MBC, 1994)
- Partner (MBC, 1994–1998)
- MBC Best Theater "On Line 2's Platform" (MBC, 1997)
- Yesterday (MBC, 1997)
- MBC Best Theater "Subway Pervert Report" (MBC, 1998)
- MBC Best Theater "The King and I" (MBC, 1998)
- Living with the Enemy: Bear and Fox (MBC, 1998)
- Shy Lovers (MBC, 1998)
- MBC Best Theater "My Soulmate Park Soon-jung" (MBC, 1998)
- Roses and Bean Sprouts (MBC, 1999)
- Ajumma (MBC, 2000–2001)
- I Love You, Hyun-jung (MBC, 2002)
- A Problem at My Younger Brother's House (SBS, 2003–2004)
- Behind the White Tower (MBC, 2007)
- How Long I've Kissed (JTBC, 2012)
- The End of the World (JTBC, 2013)
- Secret Affair (JTBC, 2014)
- Heard It Through the Grapevine (SBS, 2015)
- Something in the Rain (JTBC, 2018)
- One Spring Night (MBC, 2019)
- The Midnight Romance in Hagwon (tvN, 2024)
- The Art of Negotiation (JTBC, 2025)
- Between Steps (ENA, 2026)

=== Film ===
- In Praise of Idleness (short film, 1986) – lighting
- Over the Border (2006) – director, script editor

== Awards ==
- 2007 43rd Baeksang Arts Awards: Best Director (TV) (Behind the White Tower)
- 2014 50th Baeksang Arts Awards: Best Director (TV) (Secret Affair)
- 2015 4th CARI K Drama Awards: Best Director (TV) (Heard It Through the Grapevine)
