= Kim Yong-jun (singer) =

South Korean singer (born 1984)

- 김용준
- Born: September 12, 1984 (age 41); Seoul, South Korea
- Occupation: Singer
- Musical career
- Genres: Pop; R&B
- Instrument: Vocal
- Years active: 2004–present
- Label: Billions

- Kim Yong-jun
- Hangul: 김용준
- Hanja: 金容俊
- RR: Gim Yongjun
- MR: Kim Yongjun

Kim Yong-jun (Korean: 김용준; born September 12, 1984) is a South Korean singer. He is a member of the band SG Wannabe. In 2009, he and then-girlfriend Hwang Jung-eum joined the second season of reality dating show We Got Married as the first real couple to be featured on the show.

== Discography ==
=== Singles ===
Title	Year	Peak chart positions	Sales (Digital)	Album
Title	Year	KOR	Sales (Digital)	Album
"Couple" (커플) (with Hwang Jung-eum)	2009	—		We Got Married
"Sun Shine"	2010	80		Becoming a Billionaire OST
"Love Taste" (사랑맛) (with J Me)	2010	66		Non-album singles
"The Way We Love" (우리가 사랑하는 방법) (with Lee Bo-ram)	2013	15	KOR: 164,164	Non-album singles
"Like a Scene From a Sad Movie" (이별 영화 한 장면) (feat. Billion)	2014	90	KOR: 25,133	Non-album singles
"—" denotes release did not chart. Note: The Gaon Digital Chart was established in 2010.

== Filmography ==
=== Television shows ===
Year	Title	Role	Notes	Ref.
2009	We Got Married	Cast Member	with Hwang Jung-eum	
2010	Danbi	Cast		
2023	Groom's Class	Cast Member		

=== Web shows ===
Year	Title	Role	Notes	Ref.
2021	Kim Yong-jun's La La Radio	Host	Radio shows	
