= We Got Married season 2 =

South Korean television series season

WGM Season 2 Logo

We Got Married (우리 결혼했어요) is a popular reality South Korean variety show and a segment of the Sunday Sunday Night program. First broadcast in 2008, the show pairs up Korean celebrities to show what life would be like if they were married. Each week, couples are assigned missions to complete, with candid interviews of the participants to reveal their thoughts and feelings.

With a new format and slightly different couples, newlyweds are given a mission to complete each week. As during the special pilot episode, interviewed participants provide a unique perspective on the ongoing relationship conflicts and developments. All of the recorded material is then played in front of the participants, MCs, and audience who add commentary or clarification.

== Background ==
As of May 2009, the producers announced another change in the format with all four couples departing, cutting down to just one couple and shortening the show to just 60 minutes. The show will now portray a more realistic side to what a marriage is, instead of "the painted image of marriage based on romance". For the first time, a real couple is cast in the show. Guest celebrities are invited to be show's commentators for each episode so that they can share their opinions on marriage on behalf of their age group. Kim Yong-jun and Hwang Jung-eum also do the interview room together dressed in wedding attire.

However, due to low ratings, the show returned to its old format with the addition of a make-believe couple actor Park Jae-jung and After School member Uee on August 2, 2009. For the Chuseok special, Brown Eyed Girls' Gain & 2AM's Jo Kwon and SG Wannabe's Lee Seok-hoon & host Kim Na-young appeared as two new couples. The episode achieved Season II's highest rating, and Gain and Jo Kwon were announced to be a permanent couple.

=== Original couple ===
- Kim Yong-jun & Hwang Jung-eum (Ep 1-31)

=== Additional couples ===
- Park Jae-jung & After School's Uee (Ep 12-31)
- 2AM's Jo Kwon & Brown Eyed Girls' Gain (Ep 21-80)
- Lee Seok-hoon & Kim Na-young (Ep 21)
- Lee Sun-ho & Hwang Woo-seul-hye (ep 19-29)
- CNBLUE's Jung Yong-hwa & Girls' Generation's Seohyun (ep 40-91)
- 2PM's Nichkhun & f(x)'s Victoria (ep 52-91)

=== Season II episode summaries ===
| Ep | Date aired | Notes |
|---|---|---|
| 1 | 10 May 2009 | Yong Jun came late for the first recording which makes Jung Eum upset. They meet parents on both sides to ask for the permission so that they can get married on TV show. Guest commentators: Park Jung Ah, Gill, Oh Young Sil, and Shin Young Yil. |
| 2 | 17 May 2009 | The continuation of the previous episode. Yong Jun and Jung Eum meet each other's friends. |
| 3 | 31 May 2009 | Yong Jun and Jung Eum are given a new mission "To check a few of important things" such as house, health & hygiene, mental health, past, household atmosphere, and preparedness for emergency situations. They start with house and economic knowledge. Guest commentators: Chaeyoung, Taehyun, Oh Young Sil, and Shin Young Yil |
| 4 | 7 June 2009 | Continuation of previous episode. Yong Jun prepares an event for Jung Eum by singing his self-composed song "Couple". |
| 5 | 14 June 2009 | Yong Jun and Jung Eum are given another mission "To introduce each other's parents" and they travel to Jeju Island for vacation. Guest commentators: Park Misun, Cho Hyung Gi, Lee Sung Jin |
| 6 | 21 June 2009 | |
| 7 | 28 June 2009 | |
| 8 | 5 July 2009 | |
| 9 | 12 July 2009 | |
| 10 | 19 July 2009 | While waiting to perform at a music show, Yong Jung and Jung Eum are greeted by fellow artists 2PM and Taeyeon and Yoona of Girls' Generation. Guest commentators: Boom |
| 11 | 26 July 2009 | Henry Lau and Zhou-Mi of Super Junior-M made a guest appearance. |
| 12 | 2 August 2009 | Jae Jung and Uee appear as a new couple in this episode. They go see their WGM apartment, shop for house supplies, get a revealing and emotional tarot card reading, decorate the apartment, and Jae Jung cooks their first dinner: Ramen. Throughout the episode they go through the challenge of their 8-year age difference, different personalities and clearly communicating with each other their thoughts and feelings so they will be able to understand one another. Guest commentators: Sooyoung of Girls' Generation, Seo In |
| 13 | 9 August 2009 | Kangin appears as a guest at Yong Jun's house, giving them couple T-shirts as a newlywed gift. However, he then begins to compare their scenes with his own with former WGM partner Lee Yoon Ji during the housewarming with Super Junior members, unwittingly causing the couple to bicker when Yongun suddenly tries to appear dominant towards Jung Eum. Kangin makes a call to Yoon Ji and helps out in the kitchen. Jae Jung gives Uee a surprise. The couple spends their first night together (Uee in the bedroom & Jae Jung on the couch). Uee wakes up early to make breakfast to Jae Jung's surprise (Kimchi soup --> Her first attempt at cooking EVER) and it doesn't taste very good to both Jae Jung and Uee. They both go swimming. Jae Jung is excited to teach Uee how to swim. Uee hides the fact that she is a very good swimmer from an athletic high school to give Jae Jung confidence and make him happy. But, he eventually finds out she's a very good swimmer and they compete against each other and he loses. Uee's wish and surprise for winning against him is that he meet her After School members who surprise him. Guest commentators: Kim Hyun-joong of SS501 |
| 14 | 15 August 2009 | Jae Jung meets Uee's After School unnies and they bring him to a park. They ask him a variety of questions and make him do various tasks to prove himself worthy as a man/husband for Uee. He answers their questions and accomplishes their tasks without complaint (including one where he has to run as far as he can and then call out Uee's name then shout to her "I Love You") even though he is very nervous, but, doesn't show it. They bring him to their practice room and perform "Diva" for him. Afterward, they try to teach him dance moves from their dance and he struggles to learn the dance. After practicing they have one last performance of "Diva" in the practice room and Jae Jung dances with them. He buys them a meal that is delivered to the practice room and they members overall evaluation of Jae Jung is that they have a good impression of him giving him 89/100 points. Guest commentators: Couples: Jae Jung & Uee and Yong Jun and Jung Eum |
| 15 | 22 August 2009 | Guest commentators: Marco |
| 16 | 29 August 2009 | Jaejung takes Uee to a golf course. Guest commentators: Han Seung-yeon of Kara, Lee Hong-gi of F.T. Island |
| 17 | 5 September 2009 | |
| 18 | 12 September 2009 | |
| 19 | 19 September 2009 | |
| 20 | 26 September 2009 | |
| 21 | 3 October 2009 | Chuseok special. After a Brown Eyed Girls' performance, Gain is taken to Gumi and finds her husband to be 2AM's Jo Kwon disguised in a mongoose costume. After revealing his identity through his infamous rendition of the "Abracadabra" dance, they set off to find their new home, which to their horror is revealed to be a container box. Guest commentators: Seulong and Jinwoon of 2AM |
| 22 | 24 October 2009 | Gain and Jo Kwon bicker over the arrangement of the furniture and cooking dinner. Jo Kwon surprises Gain for her birthday with a cake made of a Choco pie, serenading a hilarious R&B version of "Happy Birthday". They challenge each other's octave range on the piano and do a duet of "Falling Slowly". |
| 23 | 31 October 2009 | Early in the morning, Gain visit's 2AM's dorm and is formally introduced to Seulong and Jinwoon. Jo Kwon enforces a set of rules written by his fans which Gain must follow. They then research on the formal titles that should be used between Gain her new "brothers-in-law". Under Jo Kwon's watchful eye, Gain starts on breakfast. |
| 24 | 7 November 2009 | Gain proceeds to make breakfast, but the 2AM members quickly become a nuisance with their constant demanding. In the end, they serenade her the song "Propose" (청혼) by Noel as an apology, as well as giving her gifts from missing member Changmin. Jo Kwon and Gain leave the dorm for their house. Yong Jun and Jung Eum prepare for the Andre Kim fashion show. |
| 25 | 14 November 2009 | Jo Kwon and Gain test each other with a lie detector and paint their house. Yong Jun prepares for a cameo role in Jung Eum's drama. The three husbands gather together at Yong Jun's house to discuss their "marriages" while the wives are sent to goondae, the South Korean army training camp. For the first time in Season II, the couples watch the footage together with the hosts in the studio. Guest commentators: Seulong of 2AM |
| 26 | 21 November 2009 | The husbands go shopping together and make kimchi at Yong Jun's house, with Seulong dropping by to help out. Meanwhile, the wives begin their training at the camp with a strict instructor. |
| 27 | 28 November 2009 | Gain and Jo Kwon take the subway to Paldang station and ride their bicycles towards a special honeymoon surprise planned by Jo Kwon. Unfortunately, a windy storm ruins these plans. Guest commentators: Onew and Key of SHINee |
| 28 | 5 December 2009 | Uee and Jae Jung go to an amusement park, after that they take their 100th day wedding shot and Jae Jung prepares an event for her. Jo Kwon and Gain go to a sauna and talk about their first loves. The couples all come together for a couples sports event. Guest commentators: Seulong and Jinwoon of 2AM, Kim Jeong Min |
| 29 | 12 December 2009 | Continuation of last week's couple sports event. Jo Kwon and Gain are stunned to find their house in the middle of a ski resort. Jo Kwon teaches Gain how to snowboard. |
| 30 | 19 December 2009 | After spending time in the ski resort, Jo Kwon and Gain move in a new house, where Jo Kwon attempts to create a couple song for them on the keyboard. Jae Jung & Uee go into a video shop and rent DVDs to watch. They decide to film a movie together as their last mission. |
| 31 | 26 December 2009 | Jung Eum & Yong Jun try to prepare a presentation for their family's Christmas Party, performing Baek Ji-young and Taecyeon (2PM)'s "My Ear's Candy", but since they don't know the steps, Young Jun calls Seulong & Jo Kwon for help. Jo Kwon and Gain record their real couple song "I Happen to Love You" with the help of Lee Minsoo, Kim Yina and Gain's fellow Brown Eyed Girls member, JeA. Jae Jung & Uee continue filming their movie which is their last mission. |
| 32 | 2 January 2010 | Jo Kwon and Gain debuts their new song on ShimShimTapa, Shindong & Kim Shin Young's radio show. The couple then celebrate their first Christmas together. New couple actor Lee Sun Ho and actress Hwang Woo-seul-hye meet for the first time. |
| 33 | 9 January 2010 | On New Year's Day, Gain returns from a performance in Singapore with gifts from international fans of WGM. After translating a mission letter written in Chinese, Jo Kwon and Gain are given traditional wedding outfits and are sent to Jongno District 114-100 to expand their knowledge on Korean marriage. |
| 34 | 16 January 2010 | With the money given to them for the mission, Jo Kwon and Gain go shopping for household items. Jo Kwon sets up Gain's princess canopy for their bed. |
| 35 | 23 January 2010 | Jo Kwon and Gain perform their duet song "I Happen to Love You" on Music Core. During the filming, HyunA visits and Gain voices her suspicions on whether or not she is Jo Kwon's former crush. Sunho and Seulhye do a special fashion photoshoot for Valentine's Day. |
| 36 | 30 January 2010 | Jo Kwon performs a special event for Gain in Park Jin-young's "Bad Party" concert. 2AM give Jo Kwon advice about girls during the taking of their music video, while Gain bakes them a cake at home. |
| 37 | 6 February 2010 | The 2AM members and staff play a prank on Gain by persuading her to do a kiss scene with Jo Kwon for their music video. The commentators are invited to Sunho and Seulhye's house after Sunho's surprise appearance at the studio. |
| 38 | 13 February 2010 | Despite their limited English, Jo Kwon and Gain escort Fahim, a foreign exchange student from Afghanistan, on a day out. During the meal, the hosts ask Sunho and Seulhye's opinion on hearing their remarks in the studio about the couple's scenes. |
| 39 | 20 February 2010 | Jo Kwon and Gain are shocked when Fahim reveals his ability to speak and understand fluent Korean, even more shocked when the next mission assigns them to take English lessons and become a 'global couple'. |
| 40 | 27 February 2010 | Jo Kwon and Gain go shopping and invite their group members 2AM and Brown Eyed Girls for a housewarming party. Gain and Changmin engage in an intense cooking competition. Jung Yong-hwa of CNBLUE and Seohyun of Girls' Generation formally meet for the first time as husband and wife and he takes her to his practice studio. |
| 41 | 6 March 2010 | Jinwoon and JeA both arrive late at the housewarming party, where all the members taste the food to conclude which side is better, from Changmin's acorn jelly and boiled pork, to Gain's spicy chicken broth and crab soup. Gain wins the cooking competition by one vote, forcing 2AM to make a public apology and take an embarrassing photograph as punishment. Meanwhile, Yonghwa and Seohyun buy couple stuff, including couple rings. They decide to do a mission, to show off their rings while performing on Music Bank |
| 42 | 13 March 2010 | The 2AM and Brown Eyed Girls members go bowling after the housewarming party, and later that night Jo Kwon and Gain make couple rings from the kit Jinwoon gave them. Yonghwa and Seohyun go to a bookstore, where Seohyun chooses a self-help book for Yonghwa to read. They also buy each other's CD, and Yonghwa also ends up buying Girls' Generation cards. After that, they visit an amusement park. |
| 43 | 20 March 2010 | Jo Kwon takes care of Gain at home after she hurts her arm. They are both invited to a Chinese New Year festival parade in Hong Kong, which would be aired on CNN. Yonghwa buys a guitar for Seohyun while asking her to fulfill his wish. |
| 44 | 27 March 2010 | Nichkhun makes a surprise appearance at Jo Kwon and Gain's house and helps improve the couple's English skills for their trip to Hong Kong. Seohyun and Yonghwa visit their house before going to the studio to practice guitar chords. |
| 45 | 24 April 2010 | Jo Kwon and Gain arrive in Hong Kong and attend the rehearsal for the parade and Jo Kwon gave Gain a piggy back. CNBLUE members throw a small "engagement party" for Yonghwa and Seohyun. Seohyun teaches them the steps in Oh! and Genie. Guest commentators: Sooyoung of Girls' Generation |
| 46 | 1 May 2010 | Jo Kwon and Gain take part in a special behind the scenes episode where they revisit and watch several scenes of their marriage. Never before seen scenes are also shown in this episode. Guest commentators: JeA of Brown Eyed Girls |
| 47 | 22 May 2010 | Jo Kwon and Gain successfully participate in the parade as well as the interview meeting with foreign reporters. Later that night, Gain gives Jo Kwon a Valentine's Day chocolate kiss on the cheek. Yonghwa's bandmates Jungshin & Minhyuk teach Seohyun how to play the bass and drums. |
| 48 | 29 May 2010 | Yonghwa and Seohyun celebrate their 22nd day anniversary by donating blood and watching Avatar. Jo Kwon and Gain wander around Hong Kong for a day as tourists. Guest commentators: JeA of Brown Eyed Girls |
| 49 | 5 June 2010 | After the movie, Yonghwa and Seohyun went home to decorate their new house. They also went on to their first and last trip as a 'to be' couple. Gain held a back hug event for Jo Kwon. Jo Kwon and Gain go on a date at the arcade and watch Hachi: A Dog's Story together where Jo Kwon plans to give Gain the long waited couple ring. |
| 50 | 12 June 2010 | Right after watching the movie, Jo Kwon takes Gain to go bungee jumping together as a remembrance of the couple ring day. Seohyun and Yonghwa go on a trip to watch the morning sunrise together. |
| 51 | 19 June 2010 | Jo Kwon and Gain briefly move into 2AM's dorm due to the expiry of their lease before they are given another mission card to their new house. Seohyun and Yonghwa bring items for their new house and look back at their memories. |
| 52 | 26 June 2010 | Nichkhun is sent to 63 Building to meet his new wife, first encountering Kim Nayoung, Eunjung of T-ara and Sunhwa of Secret, who turned out to be red herrings, before meeting Victoria on the 50th floor. Jo Kwon performs a special song he composed for Gain in their new house. Taeyeon, Tiffany, Hyoyeon, Sooyoung, and Jungshin visit Seohyun and Yonghwa at their new house. |
| 53 | 3 July 2010 | Seohyun surprises Yonghwa at the airport when CNBLUE arrive back from Thailand. Jo Kwon makes a love confession through Park Myungsoo's radio show to Gain on their 200th day anniversary. Victoria and Nichkhun eat samgyeopsal together and later go to karaoke. |
| 54 | 10 July 2010 | Seohyun and Yonghwa go to the market to make dinner. Jo Kwon and Gain do a hand-holding mission while guesting on "Come To Play". Guest Commentators: CNBLUE |
| 55 | 17 July 2010 | Seohyun and Yonghwa go get their drivers' licenses. Nichkhun and Victoria met again after being apart for 20 days for a train vacation. Jo Kwon and Gain go to a health club to prepare for their wedding photoshoot. |
| 56 | 24 July 2010 | Seohyun and Yonghwa both pass their written drivers' test, and prepare for the practical; Hyoyeon offers them a reward if they both pass. Nichkhun and Victoria go to their vacation spot and Nichkhun surprises her with his photo diary that he previously said he didn't have. Jo Kwon watches as Gain tries on wedding dresses; and Gain makes him give her a proper proposal. Guest Commentators: Luna of f(x) and Lee Jungshin of CNBLUE. |
| 57 | 31 July 2010 | Seohyun and Yonghwa both fail their practical drivers' test; to cheer them up Hyoyeon takes them to a park. Gain and Jo Kwon arrive in Bali, and have finished designing the other wedding outfits for the photo shoot. Khuntoria make a clay cup and draw each other face on clay. Nichkhun even made Victoria shocked when he mistakenly say her name. |
| 58 | 7 August 2010 | Seohyun and Yonghwa both fulfill their obligations to the bet, and fail their driving tests again. Nichkhun and Victoria make dalgona and Victoria prepares for Nichkhun's birthday. Gain and Jo Kwon have their photo-shoot in Bali. |
| 59 | 14 August 2010 | Seohyun and Yonghwa play pool and Seohyun carries Yonghwa for losing the game. Victoria celebrates Nichkhun's birthday and sends a card and presents to Nichkhun's parents. They also apply for driving tests. Gain and Jo Kwon have another photoshoot in Bali and Gain reveals her makeup-free face to Jo Kwon. |
| 60 | 21 August 2010 | Gain and Jo Kwon have their last photo-shoot in Bali and have their first kiss there. Victoria and Nichkhun test their driving and visit Namsan Tower. Seohyun and Yonghwa make kimchi at their house to give to the CNBLUE members. |
| 61 | 28 August 2010 | Seohyun arrived at the CNBLUE's dorm with Yonghwa and they went shopping for ingredients to make lunch. Seohyun even cuts her finger. Victoria and Nichkhun finish their date where they have previously started and decided to share the rest of the day with Jo Kwon and GaIn who have returned from the Bali trip. |
| 62 | 4 September 2010 | After Seohyun had eaten lunch with the CNBLUE members, Min Hyuk did some magic tricks and they went to play pool together. Jo Kwon and Gain spend time with Nichkhun and Victoria. |
| 63 | 11 September 2010 | Nichkhun and Victoria prepare for their driving tests. Seohyun and Yonghwa meet their idol, Japanese actress Ueno Juri, who starred as Nodame in Nodame Cantabile. Gain helps Jo Kwon prepare for his first solo performance and surprises him by being part of his dance crew without him knowing. |
| 64 | 18 September 2010 | Nichkhun, Victoria, GaIn, Jo Kwon, Yonghwa and Seohyun all make a trip to an abandoned school for a Chuseok special, where they must battle it out in a couple competition. A Special MC for this episode, Lee Jungshin, the bassist of CNBLUE, assists them together to the school. |
| 65 | 25 September 2010 | Jo Kwon performed his first solo performance live and realised that Gain was part of the dance crew after the performance ended. Yonghwa and Seohyun host Ueno Juri in their house and teach her some Korean phrases. Nichkhun passed his driving practical test and Victoria passed her driving theory test. They celebrate by going for go-kart race. They ate ddukboki as well, which was too hot for them. |
| 66 | 2 October 2010 | Jo Kwon and Gain go to a buffet, and try to pick what each other wants to eat. Yonghwa buys a sweet potato farm for Seohyun's birthday, after pretending to forget about it. Nichkhun takes Victoria and his f(x) "daughters" Luna, Krystal, and Sulli to a water park. |
| 67 | 9 October 2010 | Yonghwa and Seohyun plants their own sweet potatoes. They gave each other belated birthday presents as well. Jo Kwon and Gain went to record a remake version of "I Happen to Love You". Nichkhun and the f(x) members played at a water park, had lunch together and took a family photo. |
| 68 | 16 October 2010 | Yonghwa and Seohyun need to make a special performance together in a concert on a "special day". But at the same time Seohyun angry with Yonghwa for not contacting her for 1 month because he was trying to use the "pushing and pulling method". Victoria went to Busan to watch 2PM concert. They both end up jealous about something (Nichkhun about Chansung, and Victoria about his racy performance). Gain decides to celebrate Jo Kwon's birthday in her special and cute way and distracts him with kimbap. |
| 69 | 23 October 2010 | Yonghwa and Seohyun perform at the Incheon concert. Jo Kwon and Gain go for their one-year anniversary trip in Jeju Island. They go on separate routes (boat and direct flight) and are accompanied by JeA and Seulong respectively. After the concert Nichkhun brought Victoria to a yacht while preparing a surprise concert for her. |
| 70 | 30 October 2010 | Yonghwa and Seohyun change into school uniforms and exchange gifts as it's their 200th day. Jo Kwon goes to Jeju Island by plane with JeA and Gain goes to Jeju Island by ship with Seulong. Jo Kwon and JeA make a biscuit house as an anniversary gift for Gain. Nichkhun and Victoria finally go on their 'run away' trip to the beach. |
| 71 | 6 November 2010 | Yonghwa and Seohyun exchange gifts for their 200-day anniversary; and then have a date in Japan. Jo Kwon, Gain, JeA. and Seulong have buffet dinner at Jeju Island. After dinner, Jo Kwon and Gain go for a duck-boat ride while JeA and Seulong prepares a surprise event for Gain in their hotel room. Nichkhun and Victoria enjoy their time in Incheon by eating seafood and receive a mission card with an address. Nichkhun and Victoria receive their own house as celebration of their 100th day. |
| 72 | 20 November 2010 | Jo Kwon surprises Gain with the biscuit house and a letter for their one-year anniversary. They make their way to Seongsan Sunrise Peak to watch the sunrise. Victoria and Nichkhun buy stuff for their new apartment. Yonghwa and Seohyun spend time together in Japan. |
| 73 | 27 November 2010 | Jo Kwon and Gain fail to reach the Peak before the sun rises. Next, they decide to go fishing and Gain read her one-year anniversary letter to Jo Kwon. Back in their apartment, Jo Kwon gives Gain her designer pouch, due to her winning on music chart, and bracelet for a one-year anniversary gift. Nichkhun and Victoria make a music video for Nichkhun's sister. Yonghwa and Seohyun enjoy their 222nd day anniversary in Japan. |
| 74 | 4 December 2010 | Yonghwa and Seohyun harvest their sweet potatoes from their own sweet potato field. Jo Kwon and Gain are visited by BEAST member, Doojoon. Nichkhun and Victoria arrives at Thailand, and Nichkhun introduces Victoria to his family. Guest commentators: Lee Jungshin of CNBLUE |
| 75 | 11 December 2010 | Gain and Jo Kwon received a mission to visit a nursery. Yonghwa and Seohyun went to have Roasted King Prawn and Yonghwa serenade Seohyun with his new song that is written for her. Nichkhun, Victoria and Sherleen dance Nu ABO together and Victoria learn how to make Nichkhun's favorite dish, papaya salad. |
| 76 | 18 December 2010 | Gain and Jo Kwon spent time helping out in the nursery, teaching them and feeding them, having troubles when the kid throw tantrums. Yonghwa and Seohyun are back in their house fixing the sweet potatoes and labelling who it will be given to, they are given a new mission and decide to go over CNBLUE's dorm. Victoria and Nichkhun leave Nichkhun's home and the next day attended a press conference for Nichkhun which Victoria participated in as a reporter. |
| 77 | 25 December 2010 | Yonghwa and Seohyun write the lyrics to their couple song at CNBLUE's dorm and are given another mission as to where they have to showcase their new song. Jo Kwon and Nichkhun decide to record a loving duet for their wives as a Christmas event. Nichkhun also prepares another surprise for Victoria. Jokwon and Gain as a couple do not appear in this episode. |
| 78 | 1 January 2011 | Yonghwa and Seohyun, after much time and effort, finally finish recording their Banmal couple song and release it on YouTube. Victoria and Nichkhun spend some time at a cafe after Nichkhun's special performance for Victoria. Jo Kwon invites Gain out on a date to a coffee design shop in order to surprise her with an event similar to Nichkhun's, however, things don't go as planned and they end up at an outdoor skating rink instead where Jo Kwon gets much more than he ever hoped for; tears and a kiss. |
| 79 | 8 January 2011 | Victoria and Nichkhun goes to Hua Hin after the press conference, there the couple enjoy a horse ride at the beach and during the evening they visit a night market and making couple T-shirt. Yonghwa and Seohyun uploaded their song on YouTube, called their artist friends to watched them. Seohyun went to CNBLUE's concert and meets her in laws family for first time. By train, they went to Yonghwa's hometown, Busan to meet her in laws. Yonghwa taught Seohyun to greet her in laws with Busan accent. Guest commentators: Lizzy of After School |
| 80 | 15 January 2011 | Yonghwa and Seohyun met Yonghwa's mother at Busan. Much to Seohyun pleasure, she receive warm welcome from Yonghwa's mother. They later went on to the beach. Victoria and Nichkhun enjoyed their last day of honeymoon in Thailand. It started with Victoria receiving a private swimming lesson from Nichkhun and then riding a jetski on the beach. Victoria and Nichkhun have an emotional sendoff with Nichkhun's family in the airport. Jo Kwon and Gain attend a radio broadcast and announce their end of marriage. They head back to their house where Jo Kwon has prepared a last event for her. |
| 81 | 22 January 2011 | Continuation from the last episode, Seohyun and Yonghwa went to Busan. While visiting the beach, they feed the seagulls. Later on after they toured Oryuk-do, Yonghwa brings Seohyun to meet his friends. Victoria does a surprise event for Nichkhun where she records Nichkhun's performance and visits 2PM's dressing room with food she had prepared for everybody. SHINee members help Victoria with the plan. |
| 82 | 29 January 2011 | Seohyun was well received by Yong's friend. Later on, they visited Yong's old high school. Back at their home, Yonghwa cooked a meal for Seohyun. Victoria and Nichkhun goes back to their house as Nichkhun wants to fulfill his promise of cooking spaghetti for Victoria. They study Korean idioms and phrases and decorate the house with the things they bought in Thailand before cooking and eating. |
| 83 | 5 February 2011 | 2PM visits Victoria and Nichkhun for a housewarming party. Yonghwa and Seohyun given mission to take care each other. They go to the hospital to get a health check-up and afterward they go to spa for a massage. |
| 84 | 12 February 2011 | Victoria and Nichkhun continue to entertain the 2PM members in their house. Yongseo couple go on a ski trip. Yonghwa teaches Seohyun how to snowboard. |
| 85 | 19 February 2011 | Victoria and Nichkhun receive a mission: perform a couple dance for the MBC Gayo Daejun 2010. They enlist the help of an SM choreographer, Hwang Sanghun (Gregory Hwang) and Super Junior's Eunhyuk. Continuation of the ski trip, Yonghwa continues teaching but in the end Seohyun fails to do a 'S' turn. In the ski resort, Yonghwa grants Seohyun's wish by "being a wife to her". |
| 86 | 26 February 2011 | Yonghwa and Seohyun have a wedding shoot together. CNBLUE comes to the photo studio. Victoria and Nichkhun are still rehearsing for the MBC Gayo Daejun 2010 couple dance performance with Gregory Hwang and Super Junior's Eunhyuk, as Gregory Hwang brings in more choreographers and dancers to help. Khuntoria discusses whether to include a kiss in the performance or not. Guest commentators: Luna of f(x) and Junho of 2PM. |
| 87 | 5 March 2011 | Second part of Yongseo couple wedding photo shoot. MC Kim Na Young and Seulong give a surprise visit and ask the couple to do a kiss scene. Highlight was their first kiss! Yonghwa kissed Seoyun's forehead light as a feather while Seohyun cutely smacks Yonghwa's cheek. After photo session ends, they walked at the park and Seohyun gave Yonghwa a knitted scarf with their initials woven into it. Nichkhun directs Victoria, Junho, Chansung, Seulong, and Jinwoon in a teaser for MBC Gayo Daejun. |
| 88 | 12 March 2011 | Yongseo couple back at their house. Yonghwa reveals the shocking truth that he lost the scarf that Seohyun knitted while overseas and made her irrevocably angry. At that moment, their wedding photo came. Later, Yonghwa takes Seohyun shopping in an effort to redeem his mistake. Victoria and Nichkhun finally perform their couple dance on MBC Gayo Daejun 2010 after much anxiety. |
| 89 | 19 March 2011 | After shopping, Yonghwa and Seohyun go ice skating. Yonghwa continues apologizing to Seohyun. Three weeks later, they meet again and Yonghwa surprises Seohyun with a scarf he knitted himself. *He also knitted a matching one for himself. Nichkhun confesses his kiss scene in a CF to Victoria, she understands that it is just work but it still make her feel sad. Afterwards they drive through a snow storm to go on a romanic movie date. |
| 90 | 26 March 2011 | Victoria and Nichkhun went to Jeju Island for a vacation. Their taxi driver mistaken them for a real couple on their honeymoon. To make their final moments a happy and memorable one, YongSeo decided to have a good time reminiscing their past memories by going to back to the place where they first met with the surprise appearance of CNBLUE's brothers-in-law. |
| 91 | 2 April 2011 | Yonghwa and Seohyun spend their last evening together cleaning out their apartment and reliving old memories. Yonghwa surprises Seohyun with a very special present in the back of his car. Nichkhun prepares special event for Victoria's birthday and gives her a close to impossible mission. |
