= High Kick Through the Roof =

2009-10 South Korean sitcom

- Promotional poster
- Hangul: 지붕뚫고 하이킥
- RR: Jibungttulko haikik
- MR: Chibungttulk'o haik'ik
- Genre: Situation comedy
- Starring: Lee Soon-jae; Kim Ja-ok; Jeong Bo-seok; Oh Hyun-kyung; Choi Daniel; Hwang Jung-eum; Shin Se-kyung; Yoon Shi-yoon; Jin Ji-hee; Seo Shin-ae; Lee Gi-kwang
- Opening theme: "High Kick Through the Roof" by Hooni Hoon ft. Seo Ye-na
- Ending theme: "You Are My Girl!" by Kim Cho-han
- Country of origin: South Korea
- Original language: Korean
- No. of episodes: 126

Production
- Producer: Kim Byeong-ook
- Running time: 30 minutes
- Production company: Chorokbaem Media

Original release
- Network: MBC [HD]
- Release: September 7, 2009 – April 30, 2010

Related
- High Kick!; High Kick: Revenge of the Short Legged

High Kick Through the Roof (Korean: 지붕 뚫고 하이킥; RR: Jibung ttulko haikik) was a popular South Korean situation comedy revolving around the life of the Lee family.

== Cast ==
=== Soon-jae's House ===
Lee Soon-jae (이순재, Lee Soon-jae)
President of the self-named food company Lee Soon-jae F&B (Food & Beverage) and family patriarch (grandfather of Hae-ri and Jun-hyeok) in the drama. His distinguishing characteristic is his explosive farting. His first wife, Hyun-kyung's own mother, died several years ago from shock after misunderstanding his relationship with a secretary. Soon-jae's romantic pursuit of Kim Ja-ok causes conflict with his family, both due to his wife's death and Soon-Jae's own inconsiderate and rash behavior with regards to his girlfriend. He is largely contemptuous of his son-in-law Bo-Seok, whom he sees as an incompetent buffoon. He is also unreasonably jealous of Ja-ok's boarder Julien, seeing Julien as a romantic rival. He and Ja-ok get engaged and marry later in the series.

Lee Hyun-kyung (이현경, Oh Hyun-kyung)
A former taekwondo champion, Hyun-kyung is a strong-willed woman who firmly runs her household. She enrolled in Teacher's college and learned Taekwondo as her specialty. When she attended university, she met Bo-Seok and married him. A PE teacher at her son's high school, she and the vice principal (Ja-ok) often have personality conflicts. She rarely takes issues personally and is a disciplinarian both at home and at work. Although thrifty, she is generous to people when the situation merits. Towards the end of the series, she becomes pregnant.

Jeong Bo-seok (정보석, Jeong Bo-seok)
Hyun-kyung's husband and the bumbling Vice President of Lee Soon-jae F&B (Food & Beverage). Before He graduated university, he specialised in Baseball. He is often ignored and disregarded in household matters because of his low IQ and lack of common sense. However, he is also his daughter's favourite relative, and is a man of good intentions. Unfortunately, his lack of intelligence earns him no respect within the family, particularly his father-in-law and wife. He is often a scapegoat of his father-in-law's mistakes but is also the cause of many of the company's problems. Middle-aged Japanese women find him irresistible (thus the nickname Bo-sama), and non-household members often find him initially charming. He is also good at foot volleyball; at an inter-business championship, he led his team to victory.

Lee Ji-hoon (이지훈, Choi Daniel)
Hyun-kyung's brother who also lives with her family. He is perceived as cold-hearted but he is just too preoccupied with work matters to pay close attention to those around him. He is actually a warm, lovely, and funny man with a big heart. A graduate of Seoul National University's Medical School, he is a third-year surgical resident at Chorok Hospital. He is intellectually gifted and has many achievements, but does not boast or brag about them. Although he lives with his family, he is largely indifferent to household matters as his work keeps him away. He is the first in his family to reach out to Se-kyung and Shin-ae. Through a variety of comic circumstances, he also falls in love with Jun-hyeok's tutor, Hwang Jung-eum. They begin dating but due to Hwang Jung-eum's financial difficulty, she forces Ji-hoon to break up with her. At last, Ji-hoon realizes that Se-kyung likes him, but he can't reciprocate his feelings due to still loving Jung-eum and intends to get back with her. In the last episode, it was hinted that, when he was driving Se-kyung to the airport for her flight to Tahiti, he faced a tragic car accident due to heavy rain.

Jeong Jun-Hyuk (정준혁, Yoon Shi-yoon)
The tough, semi-rebellious teenage son of Lee Hyun-kyung and Jeong Bo-seok, and Hae-ri's older brother. He is lax in his studies, but is sharp and a good judge of character. He is initially very rude to his new tutor, Jeong-eum, but later comes to accept her because of her sincerity and begins to like her. Upon realizing Se-kyung's charms and beauty, he develops an intense crush on his noona (term for an older female), willing to do anything for her, such as doing housework and taking her & Shin-ae on playdates. Like his uncle, he has a soft heart and is caring for others, especially the Shin sisters. Jung-eum mistakenly thinks he loves her until she sees a picture of Se-kyung in his notebook. He's known for fighting in school and is best friends with Kang Sae-ho. He is jealous of Se-kyung's attraction toward his uncle and continually tries to impress her. He succeeds in making her to like him but loses to his uncle in winning her heart.

Jeong Hae-ri (정해리, Jin Ji-hee)
Daughter of Lee Hyun-kyung and Jeong Bo-seok, and Jun-hyeok's younger sister. Hae-ri is a spoiled, rotten and selfish elementary school girl. She is initially abusive towards Shin-ae, but later grows quite attached to her, but would never verbally admit it. She has a voracious love of kalbi (a short rib dish), which often causes her constipation. She is rude to those she dislikes. As such, her trademark phrase is "bbangkkuttongkku" (빵꾸똥꾸), which approximately translates to "farty butthole"; she also speaks to elders in banmal (casual speech). Like her father, she is not academically gifted and shows little ambition to do anything other than inherit her grandfather's riches and live in wealth her entire life. It was revealed that in the future, she will be married to Se-ho.

  - Shin Soo-yeon as young Jeong Hae-ri
  - Park Shin-hye as adult Jeong Hae-ri

=== Se Kyeong's House ===
- Jung Seok-yeong as Shin Dal-ho
  Se-kyung and Shin-ae's father. Although he lives with his daughters in what Se-kyung accurately describes as Stone-age farming conditions in the mountains, he is quickly found by debt-sharks after being photographed on a blog and essentially drops from the story after his daughters arrive in Seoul.
- Shin Se-kyung (신세경, Shin Se-kyung) : The series centres around Se-kyung and Shin-ae's involvement with the Lee family. Se-kyung is Shin-ae's highly reserved older sister and finds work as the Lee household's live-in housekeeper after a mad escapade involving her father's debt to some loan sharks. She is diligent and frugal, but also initially lacks aspirations. She is clearly more intelligent than her position allows for and longs to go to school as her peers do. Other characters come to admire her, particularly Jun-hyeok and Julien. She is unaware of most of her virtues (including beauty) and approaches the modernity of Seoul with wide-eyed bewilderment and willingness to try new things. She knows Jun-hyeok's love for her before he reveals it. She does like Jun-hyeok, but she really loves Ji-hoon. Julien also had a crush on her from the beginning, which is revealed later in the series. She eventually quits her job to immigrate to Tahiti with her family, but it was hinted in the last episode that she faced a tragic death along with Ji-hoon who was driving her to Seoul - Incheon International Airport in a car accident as their car slipped due to heavy rainfall.
- Shin Shin-ae (신신애, Seo Shin-ae) : Se-kyung's younger sister. Her bright-eyed enthusiasm earns her top grades at her school, despite her having been living in the backwoods of Taebaek for several years. She has boundless energy and has a close knit, loving relationship with her older sister. She has a charming personality and cuteness that wins over almost everyone she meets, with the notable exception of Hye-ri.

=== Ja-ok's House ===
Kim Ja-ok (김자옥, Kim Ja-ok)
Soon-jae's girlfriend and Deputy head teacher of Hyun-kyung's high school. She resides at Traditional Korean House in Bukchon Hanok Village, Samcheong-dong, Jongno District and let some rooms for tenants. She sees herself as a highly delicate and stereotypically feminine young lady, despite her advanced years. Although her relationship with Lee Soon-jae reflects this aspect of her personality, Ja-ok is also revealed as a firm landlady and an overbearing individual in her relationship with Hyun-kyung, who is the P.E. teacher at her school. Ms. Ja-ok is the Deputy head teacher of the high school (also attended by Jun-hyeok), and is known as the "Pervert Deputy head teacher" because she twists male students' nipples as a form of corporal punishment. Her personal preferences and behaviours are that of a little girl; she sleeps with a teddy bear and decorates her room as such. She later marries Soon-jae and becomes Hyun-kyung's stepmother.

Hwang Jung-eum (황정음, Hwang Jung-eum)
Jun-hyuk's English tutor and boarder of Kim Ja-ok. Jung-eum is a below-average university student attending the fictitious Seowoon University, a low-level university outside of Seoul. However, due to an error, Hyun-kyung mistakenly recognises her as a Seoul National University student and hires her as Jun-hyeok's tutor. She takes the job out of desperation and conceals her true university enrolment as a secret for most of the series. She is fiscally irresponsible because of her obsession with being fashionable, feminine, and cute. Despite her cutesy mannerisms, Jung-eum has a strong personality that drives her to do impossible things. She falls in love with Ji-hoon through a series of incidents but initially disdains his cold and (to her) arrogant personality while also rejecting Sae-ho's teenage crush on her. She later develops a serious relationship and dates with Ji-hoon. But then she forces him to break up with her due to her financial difficulties. She eventually secures stable employment which she would perform well enough to be promoted to management 3 years later.

Julien (줄리엔, Julien Kang)
An American expatriate who lives at Kim Ja-ok's traditional Korean house. He is an English teacher at Poongpa High School where Ja-Ok is the Deputy Head Teacher. He is fluent in Korean, American French and American English because of his French American roots. He bonds with the Shin sisters when he takes them in and helps them to find work in Seoul, and continues his friendship with the sisters after they begin living in the Lee household. He is highly attractive because of his height, model-like looks, and toned physique, and is seen constantly working out.

Yoo In-na (유인나, Yoo In-na)
A carefree friend and co-boarder with Jung-eum and Julien. In-na is in a long-term relationship with Kwang-soo, and hopes to become a famous singing group with him. Although Jung-eum's friend, In-na is highly aware of her tendency to not repay loans and mooching off others. She eventually succeeds in becoming an idol.

Lee Kwang-soo (이광수, Lee Kwang-soo)
In-na's boyfriend and Kim Ja-ok's least favourite boarder because of her prejudice against his ungainly appearance. He is kind and very supportive of his girlfriend, even though she finds success and fame without him.

=== Other characters ===
- Kang Se-ho (강세호, Lee Gi-kwang) : Jun-hyeok's best friend and high school buddy. Academically gifted and physically fit, he quickly develops a tremendous crush on Hwang Jung-eum and becomes her merely annoying "stalker," often shutting himself in Jun-hyeok's closet during tutoring sessions to just to watch her. He is Jun-hyeok's confidant and encourages him to confess his love for Se-kyung. It was revealed that in the future, he will be married to Hae-ri.
- Lee Bong-won as Mr Bong
  Director of Lee Soon-jae F&B. Mainly manages the day-to-day operations. He is also fluent in Japanese, so he usually interpret between Korean and Japanese
- Song Ju-yeon as Song Ju-yeon
  Hae-ri and Shin-ae's elementary school teacher.
- Hong Sun-chang as Hong Sun-chang
  The Principal of Jun-hyeok's high school, and a rival for Ja-ok's attentions.
- Im Chae-hong as Im Chae-hong
  Lee Soon-jae F&B's official chauffeur.
- Lee Seo-hyun as Yoon Seo-hyun
  A contract P.E. instructor.
- Baek Seung-hee as Baek Seung-hee
  Secretary to Lee Soon-jae, and thus subject to Soon-jae's explosive and smelly gas attacks.
- Choi Jae-won as Choi Jae-won
  Jun-hyeok's former English Tutor. Although they initially had an easygoing friendly relation, Jae-won is a moocher whose uselessness (true even in comparison to Jung-eum) leads Jun-hyeok to re-evaluate Jae-won's character. Fired early on for failing to raise Jun-hyeok's poor grades.
- Doctor Min and Doctor An
  Ji-hoon's colleagues.

=== Guest and cameo appearances ===
- Kim Hye-seong as Lee Min-ho
  Minho, the elder brother of the Unstoppable High Kick Lee family, makes a cameo appearance in the first episode. He and his friend Hyeong-wook are lost in the Taebaek Mountains. They are found and taken in by the Shin family. After developing a close relationship, he takes a picture of them and uploads it to his blog. This allows the loan sharks to find Shin Dal-ho and forces Se-kyung and Shin-ae to run away to Seoul, setting the plot in motion.
- No Hyeong-wook as No Hyeong-wook
  Also a Seoul college student.
- Kwak Jeong-wook as Kwak Jeong-wook
  Student at Jun-hyeok's high school.
- Park Chan-yeol
- Son Yeo-eun as Son Yeo-eun
  One of Ji-hoon's early blind dates, set up for him by Hyun-kyung. Unfortunately, Yeo-eun is exposed to Ji-hoon's less-than-charming social obliviousness as he notes her jaundiced eyes and inquires in public whether her urine is brown and bubbly. Her cameo ends with her furious reaction to Ji-hoon as he ignores her to watch an important baseball game of SK Wyverns.
- Kim Jung-ryul as Kim Jung-ryul
- Noh Haeng-ha as Student
- Song Gwi-hyeon as Song Gwi-hyeon
  Bo-seok's father, who (in a flashback) refuses to acknowledge his son's low IQ.
- Lee Hong-ryul as Lee Hong-ryul
- Jeong Jun-ha as Ma Dun-tak
  Jeong Jun-ha, who played an unemployed father in Unstoppable High Kick!, cameos as an incredible baseball player who was Bo-seok's rival for Hyun-kyung in college. He obviously lost Hyun-kyung's affections (having never obtained them), but went on to be a star baseball player.
- Pyo In-bong as Pyo In-bong
  A competition coordinator.
- Seo Ji-seok as Seo Ji-seok
  Ji-hoon's friend.
- Park Kyung-lim as Park Kyung-lim
  An alum of Hyun-kyung's University, and parody of Queen of Housewives.
- Jeong Kyu-soo as Jeong Kyu-soo
  Owner of a sundae and tteokbokki shop in front of Hae-ri and Shin-ae's elementary school; Kyu-soo keeps Shin-ae captive for one day after Shin-ae unthinkingly eats a mass of food for his shop without knowing Hae-ri had not paid for it.
- Ryu Seung-soo as Jang Jun-hyup
  Chorok Hospital Chief of Surgery.
- Kim Yong-jun as Kim Yong-jun
  A Veterinarian at the animal hospital.
- Kang Bit as Jeong Kyo-bin
  Hae-ri's temporary boyfriend, a Gu Jun-pyo-type character whose extravagant ways belie his youth. Although he initially pursues Hae-ri, Kyo-bin instantly falls for Shin-ae, and the elementary-school love triangle results in a Temptation of the Wife parody.
- Jung Il-woo as Jung Il-woo
  Original main character from High Kick!'s first season, Il-woo portrays Jung-eum's first love and the original owner of her dog. Although he left her to ostensibly travel the world, his character suffered from a terminal illness and died.
- Chae Sang-woo as Chae Sang-woo
  Acquaintance of Shin-ae's when she is addicted to the doll-draw machine.
- Yun Ki-won as Yun Ki-won
  A mentally-ill man who convinces Bo-seok that he is an agent from the year 2109, when robots have taken over the world.
- Park Ji-yeon as Lee Yu-ri
  A tough, ulzzang high schooler who crushes on Jun-hyeok. After being rejected by him, however, she persistently pursues him until he desperately has Hwang Jung-eum pose as his girlfriend.
- Lee So-jung as Lee So-jung
  Ji-hoon's colleague at the hospital and friend.
- Jeong Ga-eun as Jeong Ga-eun
  Bo-seok friend's girlfriend who emigrated to the United States; Ga-eun is Bo-seok's first love.
- Soy as Soy
  A Korean American Second Language teacher who taught Korean to Julien, she is a Julien's friend.
- Yoon Jong-shin and Jang Han-jun as Yoon Jong-shin and Jang Han-jun
  Elders who helps Jung-eum and In-na install electronics.
- Kim Han-suk as Sa Eun-pung
  Knows Kwang-soo and In-na .
- Hooni Hoon as Hooni Hoon
  Hip Hop Bo-seok in the liver of the club DJ.
- Kim Bum as Kim Bum
  A cast-member from the first season; Kim Bum is an engineering student.
- Kim Gyeong-jin as Kim Gyeong-jin
  A homeless person who received Christmas present from Hwang Jung-eum which originally was for Lee Ji-hoon.
- Kim Gyeong-ryong as Kim Gyeong-ryong
  an Owner and Chef of a prime-rib restaurant.
- Huh Cham as Lee Cham
  Younger brother of Soon-jae.
- Danny Ahn as Ahn Shin-won
  Ji-hoon's friend.
- Shin Ji as Shin Ji
  Ji-hoon's friend.
- Yang Hun as Yang Hun
- Jang Jung-hee as Jang Jung-hee
  Chorok Hospital head nurse.
- Yang Taek-jo as Yang Taek-jo
  Grandmother with dementia.
- Lee Na-young as Lee Na-bong
  Ji-hoon's first love and heartbreak.
- Park Yeong-gyu as Park Yeong-gyu
  Kim Ja-Ok's junior.
- Jung Kyung-ho as Jung Kyung-ho
- Tiger JK as Tiger JK
  Kwang-soo's friend.
- Jun Hwan-kyu as Jun Hwan-kyu
- Jung Woong-in as Jung Woong-in
- Oh Sang-jin as Park Ji-sung
- Kim Tae-won as Kim Tae-won
- Cho Won-seok as Cho Won-seok
  Appears in In-na's music video.
- Yong Jun-hyung as himself
- Jung Suk-won as Jung Suk-won
- 4Minute
- Sunwoo Yong-nyeo as Sunwoo Yong-nyeo

== Awards and nominations ==
Year	Award	Category	Recipient	Result	Ref.
2009	MBC Entertainment Awards	Best Couple Award in a Sitcom/Comedy	Yoon Shi-yoon and Shin Se-kyung	Won	
2009	MBC Entertainment Awards	Best Young Actor/Actress	Jin Ji-hee	Won	
2009	MBC Entertainment Awards	Best Young Actor/Actress	Seo Shin-ae	Won	
2009	MBC Entertainment Awards	Best New Actor in a Sitcom/Comedy	Choi Daniel	Won	
2009	MBC Entertainment Awards	Best New Actress in a Sitcom/Comedy	Shin Se-kyung	Won	
2009	MBC Entertainment Awards	Best New Actress in a Sitcom/Comedy	Hwang Jung-eum	Won	
2009	MBC Entertainment Awards	Lifetime Achievement Award	Lee Soon-jae	Won	
2010	46th Baeksang Arts Awards	Best New Actress in TV	Hwang Jung-eum	Won	
2010	3rd Korea Drama Awards	Most Popular Actress	Hwang Jung-eum	Won	
2010	3rd Korea Drama Awards	Special Jury Prize	Kim Byung-wook	Won	
2010	11th Korea Visual Arts Festival	Photogenic Award, TV Actress category	Hwang Jung-eum	Won	
2010	DramaBeans Awards	Favourite Family Drama	High Kick Through the Roof	Nominated	
2011	15th Puchon International Fantastic Film Festival	Fantasia Award	Choi Daniel, Shin Se-kyung	Won	
2012	1st K-Drama Star Awards	Lifetime Achievement Award	Lee Soon-jae	Won	
2012	APAN Star Awards	Achievement Award	Lee Soon-jae	Won	

== Original soundtrack ==
Part 1

1. High Kick Through The Roof (지붕뚫고 하이킥) - Hooni Hoon feat. Seo Ye-na
2. You Are My Girl - Kim Cho-han
3. Don't Say Goodbye - Kim Cho-han
4. Open Your Mind - Soul Breeze feat. Kim Cho-han

Part 2

1. Hold On Your Breath (숨을 참아요) - Seo Ye-na
2. The Road To Me (내게 오는 길) - Yoon Shi-yoon
3. Don't Look Back, High Kick (뒤돌아 보지마 하이킥) - Kim Cho-han

Special Edition

1. You're My Girl - Kim Jo-han
2. Little Girl
3. High Kick Through The Roof - Hooni Hoon feat. Seo Ye-na
4. Present For You
5. The Road To Me (Studio Version) - Yoon Shi-yoon
6. Trying To Find Her - Kim Jo-han
7. Don't Say Goodbye - Kim Jo-han
8. Beautiful Love
9. Friday Night - Hooni Hoon
10. Scream (소리질러) - Hooni Hoon
11. Say Ho - Hooni Hoon feat. Nacko
12. Open Your Mind - Soul Breeze feat. Kim Jo-han
13. Hold On Your Breath - Seo Ye-na

== International broadcast ==
It aired in Japan on cable channel KNTV.

It aired in Vietnam on HTV3 in 2010. However, for unknown reasons involving HTV3 and TVM Corp, the network temporarily lost the rights to the series. It was broadcast again in 2013.

It aired in Panama on RPC-TV in 2019.

It is set to air in Myanmar on SKYNET International Drama in upcoming 2020.

== Remake ==
A Vietnamese adaptation of the show, Gia đình là số 1 - Phần 2, aired on channel HTV7 in 2019. It was distributed by Điền Quân Media and Entertainment.
