= Marriage Contract =

2016 South Korean television series

- Promotional poster
- Genre: Melodrama
- Written by: Jung Yoo-kyung
- Directed by: Kim Jin-min
- Starring: Lee Seo-jin; Uee; Kim Yong-geon; Park Jung-soo; Lee Hwi-hyang; Kim Young-pil; Shin Rin-ah; Kim Kwang-kyu; Kim Yoo-ri
- Country of origin: South Korea
- Original language: Korean
- No. of episodes: 16

Production
- Producer: Kim Hee-yeol
- Running time: 65 minutes
- Production company: Pan Entertainment

Original release
- Network: MBC TV
- Release: March 5 – April 24, 2016

Marriage Contract (Korean: 결혼계약; Hanja: 結婚契約; RR: Gyeolhongyeyak) is a 2016 South Korean television series starring Lee Seo-jin and Uee. It aired on MBC from March 5 to April 24, 2016 on Saturdays and Sundays at 22:00 for 16 episodes.

== Plot ==
Kang Hye-soo (Uee) is a single mother who struggles to raise her daughter while paying off her late husband's debts. Han Ji-hoon (Lee Seo-jin) is the son of a chaebol who seeks a contract marriage in order to save his mother, who needs a liver transplant. When Hye-soo is diagnosed with an inoperable brain tumor, she agrees to marry Ji-hoon and donate part of her liver to his mother, in exchange for enough money to provide for her daughter until she reaches adulthood.

== Cast ==
- Lee Seo-jin as Han Ji-hoon
- Uee as Kang Hye-soo
- Kim Yong-gun as Han Seong-gook
- Park Jung-soo as Yoon Seon-yeong
- Lee Hwi-hyang as Oh Mi-ran
- Kim Young-pil as Han Jeong-hoon
- Shin Rin-ah as Cha Eun-seong
- Kim Kwang-kyu as Park Ho-joon
- Kim Yoo-ri as Seo Na-yoon
- Jung Kyung-soon as Shim Yeong-hee
- Lee Hyun-geol as Kong Soo-chang
- Pyo Ye-jin as Hyun A-ra
- Ahn Ji-hoon as Jo Seung-joo
- Kim So-jin as Hwang Joo-yeon
- Jin Seon-kyu as Oh Mi-ran's doctor

== Ratings ==
Episode #	Original broadcast date	Average audience share			
Episode #	Original broadcast date	TNmS Ratings		AGB Nielsen	
Episode #	Original broadcast date	Nationwide	Seoul National Capital Area	Nationwide	Seoul National Capital Area
1	March 5, 2016	17.3%	18.4%	17.2%	18.2%
2	March 6, 2016	17.1%	18.5%	18.0%	19.3%
3	March 12, 2016	16.6%	17.0%	17.3%	19.6%
4	March 13, 2016	17.4%	17.9%	17.8%	19.6%
5	March 19, 2016	17.0%	18.2%	18.0%	19.7%
6	March 20, 2016	17.9%	18.4%	19.3%	20.6%
7	March 26, 2016	16.1%	17.3%	18.4%	20.3%
8	March 27, 2016	18.5%	19.8%	20.4%	22.4%
9	April 2, 2016	18.0%	19.6%	18.9%	20.7%
10	April 3, 2016	18.4%	20.6%	22.0%	24.6%
11	April 9, 2016	17.0%	19.0%	20.6%	22.4%
12	April 10, 2016	18.1%	18.7%	22.9%	25.4%
13	April 16, 2016	17.1%	18.4%	19.6%	21.5%
14	April 17, 2016	19.0%	20.1%	21.3%	23.4%
15	April 23, 2016	18.0%	18.7%	19.3%	21.5%
16	April 24, 2016	20.3%	22.8%	22.4%	23.6%
Average		17.7%	19.0%	19.6%	21.4%

== Awards and nominations ==
Year	Award	Category	Recipient	Result
2016	5th APAN Star Awards	Excellence Award, Actress in a Miniseries	Uee	Nominated
2016	9th Korea Drama Awards	Best Production Director	Kim Jin-min	Won
2016	9th Korea Drama Awards	Excellence Award, Actor	Lee Seo-jin	Nominated
2016	21st Asian Television Award	Best Drama Series	Marriage Contract	Nominated
2016	23rd Grimae Awards	Best Actress	Uee	Won
2016	36th MBC Drama Awards	Grand Prize (Daesang)	Lee Seo-jin	Nominated
2016	36th MBC Drama Awards	Grand Prize (Daesang)	Uee	Nominated
2016	36th MBC Drama Awards	Drama of the Year	Marriage Contract	Nominated
2016	36th MBC Drama Awards	Top Excellence Award, Actor in a Special Project Drama	Lee Seo-jin	Won
2016	36th MBC Drama Awards	Top Excellence Award, Actress in a Special Project Drama	Uee	Won
2016	36th MBC Drama Awards	Excellence Award, Actress in a Special Project Drama	Kim Yoo-ri	Nominated
2016	36th MBC Drama Awards	Golden Acting Award, Actress in a Special Project Drama	Lee Hwi-hyang	Won
2016	36th MBC Drama Awards	Best Young Actress	Shin Rin-ah	Nominated
2016	36th MBC Drama Awards	Best Couple Award	Lee Seo-jin and Uee	Nominated
