= 2nd Korea Drama Awards =

2008 edition of award ceremony

- Date: November 1, 2008
- Site: Jinju, South Gyeongsang Province
- Hosted by: Yeon Jung-hoon; Lee Da-hae

The 2nd Korea Drama Awards is an awards ceremony for excellence in television in South Korea. It was held in Jinju, South Gyeongsang Province on November 1, 2008 and hosted by Yeon Jung-hoon and Lee Da-hae. The nominees were chosen from 120 Korean dramas that aired from October 1, 2007 to September 30, 2008.

== Nominations and winners ==
(Winners denoted in bold)

Grand Prize (Daesang)	Best Drama
**Kim Myung-min** - **Beethoven Virus**	**Mom's Dead Upset (KBS2)**; Dae Jo-yeong (KBS1); Gourmet (SBS); The Legend (MBC)
Top Excellence Award, Actor	Top Excellence Award, Actress
**Choi Soo-jong** - **Dae Jo-yeong**; Cho Jae-hyun - New Heart; Kim Myung-min - Beethoven Virus	**Kim Ha-neul** - **On Air**; Bae Jong-ok - Woman of Matchless Beauty, Park Jung-geum; Kim Hye-ja - Mom's Dead Upset
Excellence Award, Actor	Excellence Award, Actress
**Kim Rae-won** - **Gourmet**; Ahn Nae-sang - First Wives' Club; Jang Keun-suk - Beethoven Virus; Kim Sang-kyung - The Great King, Sejong	**Han Ji-hye** - **Likeable or Not**; Kim Ji-ho - Even So Love; Sung Yu-ri - Hong Gil-dong; Yoo Sun - That Woman Is Scary
Netizen Popularity Award	Special Jury Prize
**Im Yoona** - **You're My Destiny**; **Kim Bum** - **East of Eden**; **Kim Hee-jung** - **First Wives' Club**; **Kim Hyun-sook** - **Rude Miss Young-ae - Season 3**; Cha Ye-ryun - Working Mom; Lee Jin-wook - Glass Castle; Lee Young-eun - Likeable or Not; Park Jae-jung - You're My Destiny; Yoon Sang-hyun - Winter Bird, The Secret of Coocoo Island	**Kim Hae-sook** - **First Wives' Club**
Achievement Award	Hallyu Achievement Award
**Baek Il-seob** - **Mom's Dead Upset**; Choi Bool-am; Kang Boo-ja; Na Moon-hee	**Bae Yong-joon** - **The Legend**
