= Uee =

South Korean singer and actress (born 1988)

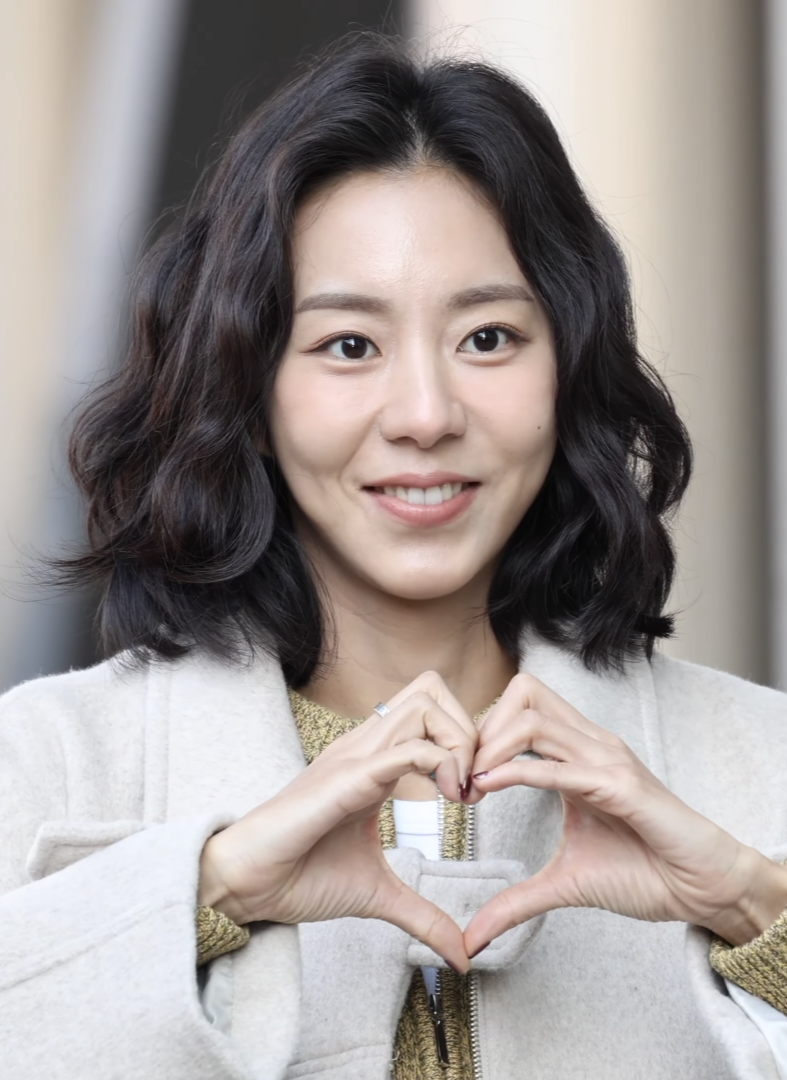
- Uee in November 2025
- Born: Kim Yu-jin; April 9, 1988 (age 38); Daejeon, South Korea
- Education: Sungkyunkwan University
- Occupations: Singer; actress
- Years active: 2009–present
- Agent: Lucky Company
- Father: Kim Sung-kap
- Musical career
- Genre: K-pop
- Instrument: Vocals
- Years active: 2007–present
- Labels: Good; Pledis
- Formerly of: Five Girls; After School

Korean name
- Hangul: 김유진
- RR: Gim Yujin
- MR: Kim Yujin

Stage name
- Hangul: 유이
- RR: Yui
- MR: Yui

Kim Yu-jin (Korean: 김유진; born April 9, 1988), known professionally as Uee (유이; sometimes romanized as U-ie), is a South Korean singer and actress. She is best known for being a former member of South Korean girl group After School from 2009 to 2017, and has acted in various television dramas including Queen Seondeok (2009), Ojakgyo Family (2011), Jeon Woo-chi (2012), Golden Rainbow (2013), High Society (2015), Hogu's Love (2015), Marriage Contract (2016), and My Only One (2018). On May 31, 2017, Uee left After School and its agency, Pledis Entertainment.

== Early life ==
Kim Yu-jin was born April 9, 1988, in Daejeon, South Korea. Her father, Kim Sung-kap, is a retired professional baseball player and former head coach for the South Korean teams, Nexen Heroes and SK Wyverns. She has an older sister, Kim Yu-na. Uee attended Guwol Girls' Middle School and Incheon Physical Education High School. While in high school, she was a swimmer and competed in the Korean National Sports Festival. She later graduated from Sungkyunkwan University, with a degree in Performing Arts.

== Career ==
=== 2007–2008: Five Girls and career beginnings ===
Uee originally desired to be an actress and went to many auditions, but she debuted as a singer first. In 2007, Uee was a member of the girl group Five Girls (Korean: 오소녀; RR: Osonyeo) under Good Entertainment, which also included Yubin, Jun Hyoseong, Yang Jiwon, and G.NA. The group starred in a reality show on MTV called Diary of Five Girls, but disbanded before their scheduled debut due to Good Entertainment's financial troubles.

Before debuting, she was once a hot topic in South Korea. On May 30, 2008, while watching her father's baseball game in Mokdong Stadium, she was caught by the camera and became known as the "Mokdong Girl". In August 2008, after appearing as Yubin's friend in the MBC show Introducing the Star's Friend, she again became popular because of her friendship with the Wonder Girls member and her resemblance to Moon Geun-young. Uee later joined Pledis Entertainment.

=== 2009–2016: After School and acting career ===
In April 2009, Uee joined the girl group After School with their single "Diva". She became known for her "honey thighs" and proved popular with the general public, often topping online search rankings on various Korean websites.

In July, she made her acting debut in MBC's historical drama, Queen Seondeok, which was well received and won various awards. She was subsequently cast in SBS's musical drama You're Beautiful, which started airing in October. Later that month, she joined the project group, 4Tomorrow, which consists Han Seung-yeon, Hyuna, and Gain; and released the single "Dugeundugeun Tomorrow" (Korean: 두근두근 Tomorrow) on October 6, 2009. That same year, she joined the MBC reality show We Got Married and was paired with Park Jae-jung. Uee ranked eighth on Forbes Korea's list of most hardworking idols in 2009–2010.

Uee had lead roles in two television dramas in 2011. In Birdie Buddy, she played a country girl who strives to become a professional golfer. The drama's director, Yun Sang-ho, praised Uee's "flawless acting", saying, "I believe actors from idol groups such as Uee and Luna improve more quickly because they have so much talent and passion". In Ojakgyo Family, Uee played a university student with a difficult family history. She earned praise for her natural acting and received Best New Actress awards at the Paeksang Arts Awards and KBS Drama Awards. Uee released her first solo single, "Sok Sok Sok" (쏙쏙쏙), on June 21, 2011. She also co-hosted the variety show Night After Night.

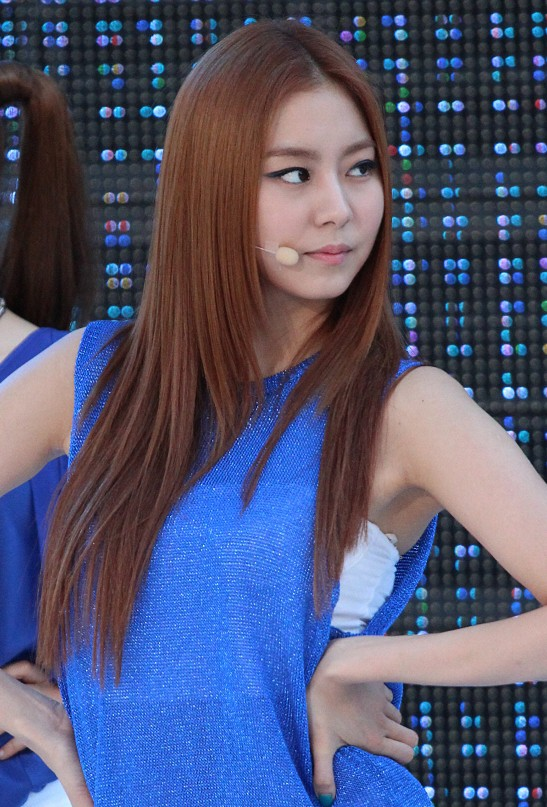
Uee performing as part of After School in 2012

In January 2012, Uee became a permanent host on the KBS music show, Music Bank, along with Lee Jang-woo. She continued hosting the show until April 2013. From November 2012 to February 2013, she starred as princess Hong Mu-yeon in Jeon Woo-chi, a historical drama set during the Joseon period. When she was cast for the role, Uee expressed her desire to be seen as a serious actor, saying "I want to do away with the 'idol singer-turned-actor' in this piece and really step up my performance". During the shoot, she was praised for her ability to immerse herself in the character and give a detailed performance.

Uee was a permanent cast member of SBS' survival variety show Barefooted Friends in 2013. During the show, she performed the song "Hero" at a special concert. The song was produced by Duble Sidekick and co-written by Uee, and subsequently released on the soundtrack album My Story, My Song on August 19. She had a lead role in the drama Golden Rainbow, and received an Excellence Award at the 2013 MBC Drama Awards for the role.

In mid-2014, Uee was a member of the survival variety show Law of the Jungle, appearing in the Indian Ocean episodes. In April of that year, she told Ilgan Sports she had lost some of her passion for singing and dancing, and plans to further her acting career once she graduates from After School.

In early 2015, Uee starred in tvN's romantic comedy Hogu's Love, playing a national swimming champion. She was then cast in the SBS drama High Society, playing a rich heiress who hides her identity in order to find true love. In an interview, Uee acknowledged that some viewers were disappointed with her performance, and she had "never been more criticized for poor acting". In October 2015, Uee joined the variety show, Fists of Shaolin Temple, where the cast members received martial arts training.

Uee's next drama, MBC's Marriage Contract, began airing on March 5, 2016. She played single mother with a terminal illness who enters into a contract marriage. In November, Uee starred in the MBC drama Night Light where she plays a poor woman who turns her life around with an opportunity.

=== 2017–present: Focus on acting and other works ===
Uee's contract with Pledis Entertainment ended on May 31, 2017, therefore she graduated from After School. In June 2017, she signed with new management agency Yuleum Entertainment. She then starred alongside Kim Jae-joong in KBS's fantasy romance-comedy drama Manhole. In 2018, Uee starred in the weekend dramas My Contracted Husband, Mr. Oh together with Kim Kang-woo; and My Only One.

In July 2019, it was confirmed that Uee signed an exclusive contract with King Entertainment. She was later picked as part of the cast for Cabin Crew Season 2 in 2019. The show features four celebrities challenging to experience the real work of flight attendants, from job interview to training. Season 2 ended early 2020.

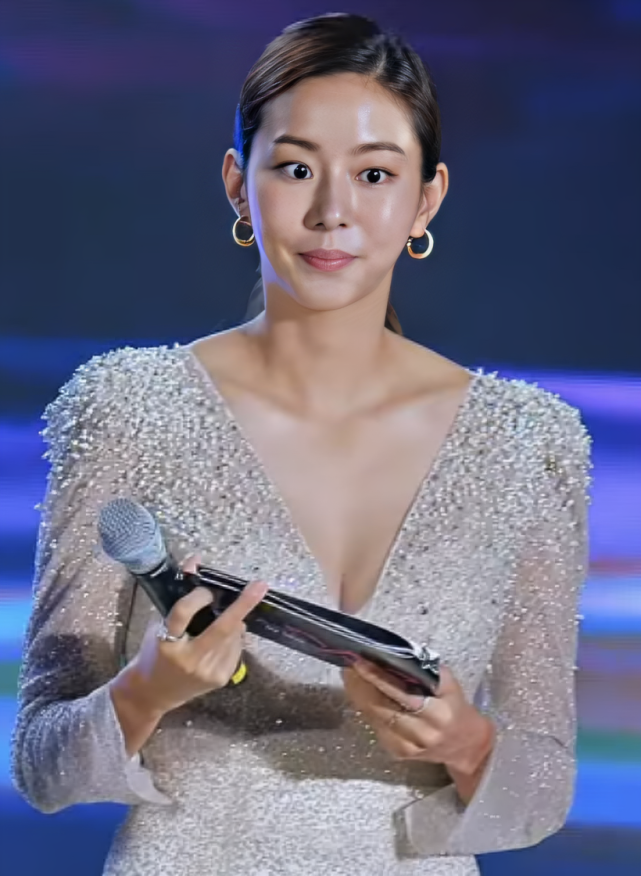
Uee in 2022

On June 12, 2020, Uee appeared as guest on the Korean variety show I Live Alone. The show features single celebrities and their everyday lives, both in and out of their homes. At the same month, she also appeared as a guest in the show Dogs Are Incredible along with her dog, Mango. On August 1, she also appeared on another variety show Omniscient Interfering View along with her manager. The show observes the lives of celebrities and their managers. Uee also played as Han Ji-won in the 7th episode of SF8 titled Love Virtually alongside Choi Si-won. The episode was aired on September 25, 2020. After her love for spicy foods was shown her recent I Live Alone appearance, she was selected as the official endorser for Samyang Food's 'Fire Chicken Sauce' Series.

In 2020, Uee hosted Glance TV's Last Fit with U-ie, a fitness program showcasing beginner to advanced exercises that can be done at home while under quarantine. The first broadcast started in August via Naver TV. On October 23, Uee hosted the 2020 Live in DMZ Concert along with Super Junior's Leeteuk. The concert was held in Gyeonggi Province to commemorate the 2nd anniversary of the September 2018 Pyongyang Joint Declaration. The concert was broadcast on October 24 via MBC.

On February 8, 2021, it was reported that Uee had cut ties with King Entertainment. Following the report, the agency confirmed that their exclusive contract with the actress has expired. On March 29, 2021, it was announced that she had signed an exclusive contract with Lucky Company. On June 3, it was announced that Uee will star in the variety program called Spicy Girls along with Sunny, Kim Shin-young, and Choi Yoo-jung. She later went on to star in the drama Ghost Doctor alongside Rain and Kim Bum. The drama premiered in January 2022.

== Personal life ==
In 2016, it was confirmed by Uee's representatives that she was dating fellow actor Lee Sang-yoon. The couple broke up after a year of dating.

In July 2017, Uee confirmed that she was dating Law of the Jungle co-star Kangnam. This confirmation came after Korean website Dispatch released photos of them on a date in Apgujeong. Uee initially denied the rumors. After 3 months of dating, the couple announced that they had split up.

Uee has been a target of hate and criticism since her debut, in particular with her weight and an alleged sponsorship she received from a large company. In 2018, her agency Yuleum Entertainment announced that they will take legal measures against the malicious and defamatory comments towards their talent.

During her I Live Alone appearance, she revealed that rumors surrounding her weight caused her a lot of stress, leading her to eat only one meal a day for eight years. Since then she began to focus more on her health while getting back on track with her career.

=== Philanthropy ===
On April 8, 2022, Uee donated ₩20 million to international relief and development NGOs to fund hygiene products, such as sanity wear kits and sanitary pants coupons, alongside a monthly information brochure for 120 youths entering young women's homes across the country.

== Discography ==
=== Singles ===
Title	Year	Peak chart positions	Album
Title	Year	KOR	Album
"Sok Sok Sok" (featuring JR of NU'EST)	2011	64	Non-album single
"Hero" (featuring Kim Jungah)	2013	—	Barefooted Friends: My Story, My Song
"—" denotes releases that did not chart or were not released in that region.

== Filmography ==
=== Television series ===
Year	Title	Role	Notes	Ref.
2009	Queen Seondeok	young Mishil		
2009	You're Beautiful	Yoo He-yi		
2010	My Girlfriend Is a Gumiho	Art major in college	cameo (Episode 5)	
2011	All My Love for You	Kim Yu-jin	cameo (Episode 182 and 210)	
2011	Birdie Buddy	Sung Mi-soo		
2011	Ojakgyo Family	Baek Ja-eun		
2012	Jeon Woo-chi	Princess Hong Mu-yeon		
2013	Golden Rainbow	Kim Baek-won		
2015	Hogu's Love	Do Do-hee		
2015	High Society	Jang Yoon-ha		
2015	She Was Pretty	Guest for The Most 20th Anniversary	cameo (Episode 9)	
2016	Marriage Contract	Kang Hye-soo		
2016	Night Light	Lee Se-jin		
2017	Manhole	Kang Soo-jin		
2018	My Contracted Husband, Mr. Oh	Han Seung-joo		
2018	My Only One	Kim Do-ran		
2020	SF8	Han Ji-won	Episode: "Love Virtually"	
2022	Ghost Doctor	Jang Se-jin		
2023	Live Your Own Life	Lee Hyo-sim		

=== Television shows ===
Year	Title	Role	Notes	Ref.
2009	We Got Married Season 2	Cast member		
2010	Night After Night	Co-host		
2011	Music Bank	Co-host		
2013	Barefooted Friends	Cast member		
2014	Law of the Jungle in Indian Ocean	Cast member	Episodes 117–125	
2015	Fists of Shaolin Temple	Cast member		
2017	Law of the Jungle in New Zealand	Cast member	Episodes 265–270	
2019	Cabin Crew Season 2	Cast member		
2021	Spicy Girls	Cast member		
2022	Kilimanjaro	Cast member	with Yoon Eun-hye, Hyo-jeong, and Son Ho-jun	
2024–2025	Iron Girls	Cast member	Season 1–2	

== Awards and nominations ==
Year	Award	Category	Nominated work	Result	Ref.
2009	MBC Entertainment Awards	Best Newcomer – Female (Variety Show)	We Got Married	Won	
2011	2nd Barbie & Ken Awards	Barbie of the Year	—N/a	Won	
2011	KBS Drama Awards	Best New Actress	Ojakgyo Family	Won	
2011	KBS Drama Awards	Best Couple Award with Joo Won	Ojakgyo Family	Nominated	
2012	48th Baeksang Arts Awards	Best New Actress (TV)	Ojakgyo Family	Won	
2012	KBS Drama Awards	Excellence Award, Actress in a Mid-length Drama	Jeon Woo-chi	Nominated	
2012	KBS Drama Awards	Netizen Award, Actress	Jeon Woo-chi	Nominated	
2012	KBS Drama Awards	Best Couple Award with Cha Tae-hyun	Jeon Woo-chi	Nominated	
2013	MBC Drama Awards	Excellence Award, Actress in a Special Project Drama	Golden Rainbow	Won	
2015	8th Korea Drama Awards	Excellence Award, Actress	High Society	Nominated	
2015	SBS Drama Awards	Excellence Award, Actress in a Miniseries	High Society	Nominated	
2015	SBS Entertainment Awards	Best Teamwork Award	Fists of Shaolin Temple	Won	
2016	5th APAN Star Awards	Excellence Award, Actress in a Miniseries	Marriage Contract	Nominated	
2016	1st Asia Artist Awards	Best Celebrity Award, Actress	Marriage Contract	Nominated	
2016	29th Grimae Awards	Best Actress	Marriage Contract	Won	
2016	MBC Drama Awards	Grand Prize (Daesang)	Marriage Contract	Nominated	
2016	MBC Drama Awards	Top Excellence Award, Actress in a Special Project Drama	Marriage Contract	Won	
2016	MBC Drama Awards	Best Couple Award with Lee Seo-jin	Marriage Contract	Nominated	
2018	11th Korea Drama Awards	Excellence Award, Actress	My Contracted Husband, Mr. Oh	Nominated	
2018	6th APAN Star Awards	Excellence Award, Actress in a Serial Drama	My Contracted Husband, Mr. Oh	Nominated	
2018	23rd KCA Consumer Day Awards	Best Drama Actor	My Only One	Won	
2018	MBC Drama Awards	Top Excellence Award, Actress in a Weekend Special Project	My Contracted Husband, Mr. Oh	Nominated	
2018	MBC Drama Awards	Selfish Motive Award – Organic Parody Award with Kim Kang-woo	My Contracted Husband, Mr. Oh	Won	
2018	KBS Drama Awards	Excellence Award, Actress in a Serial Drama	My Only One	Won	
2018	KBS Drama Awards	Netizen Award, Actress	My Only One	Nominated	
2018	KBS Drama Awards	Best Couple Award with Lee Jang-woo	My Only One	Won	
2023	9th APAN Star Awards	Top Excellence Award, Actress in a Serial Drama	Live Your Own Life	Nominated	
2023	KBS Drama Awards	Top Excellence Award, Actress	Live Your Own Life	Won	
2023	KBS Drama Awards	Popularity Award, Actress	Live Your Own Life	Won	
2023	KBS Drama Awards	Best Couple Award with Ha Jun	Live Your Own Life	Won	
2023	KBS Drama Awards	Excellence Award, Actress in a Serial Drama	Live Your Own Life	Nominated	
