= Hwang Jung-eum =

South Korean actress and singer (born 1984)

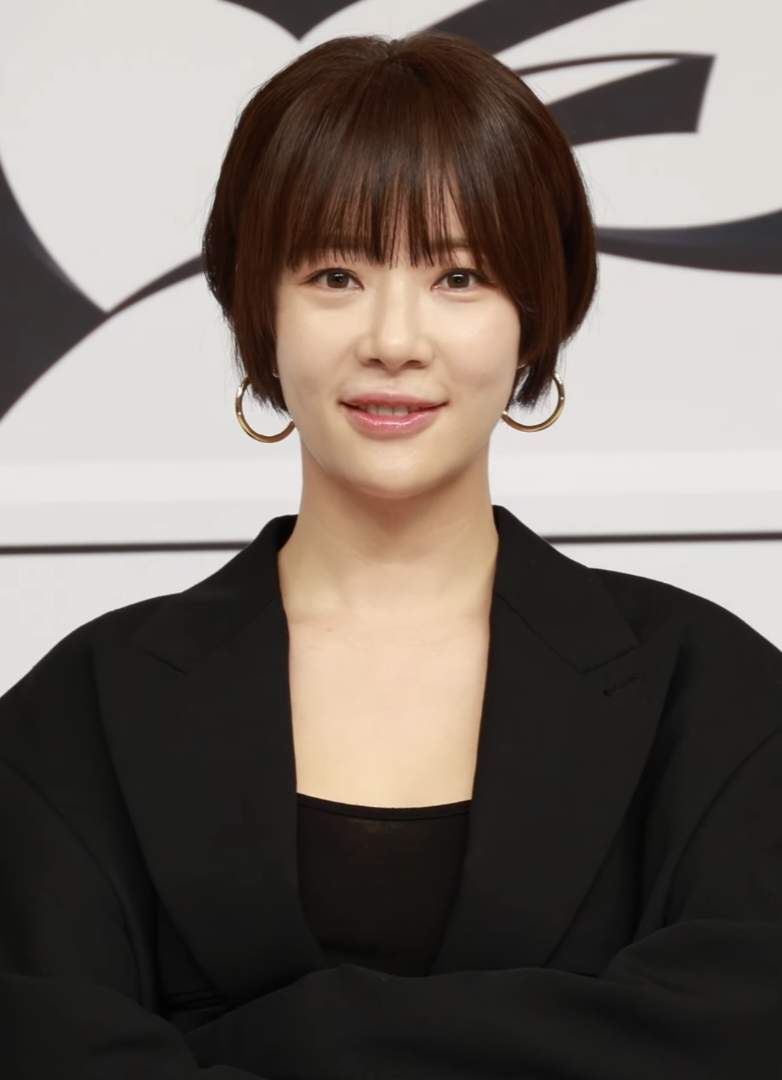
- Hwang in March 2024
- Born: December 25, 1984 (age 41); Gil-dong, Gangdong District, Seoul, South Korea
- Education: University of Suwon
- Occupations: Actress; singer
- Years active: 2001–present
- Agent: Y.ONE Entertainment
- Spouse: Lee Young-don (m. 2016; div. 2025)
- Children: 2

Korean name
- Hangul: 황정음
- Hanja: 黃正音
- RR: Hwang Jeongeum
- MR: Hwang Chŏngŭm

Hwang Jung-eum (Korean: 황정음; born December 25, 1984) is a South Korean actress and singer. She first gained recognition for her role in the sitcom High Kick Through the Roof (2009). After starring in her first leading role in television series Listen to My Heart (2011), she became notable for Full House Take 2 (2012), Secret Love (2013), Kill Me, Heal Me (2015), She Was Pretty (2015), The Undateables (2018), Mystic Pop-up Bar (2020), and The Escape of the Seven (2023–2024).

== Career ==
=== 2001–2008: Career beginnings ===
Hwang Jung-eum debuted with K-pop girl group Sugar in 2001 as a lead vocalist, but left the group in 2004 to pursue a solo career. Hwang appeared as a recurring guest on the variety show Love Letter from 2004 to 2006, in which her onscreen pairing with singer Kim Jong-min became popular. She officially made her acting debut in the television drama The Person I Love in 2007.

=== 2009–2014: Rising popularity as a television actress ===
In 2009, she and real-life boyfriend Kim Yong-jun (of boy band SG Wannabe) joined the second season of reality dating show We Got Married as the first real-life couple to be featured on the show. Later that year, Hwang rose to mainstream stardom when she appeared in the daily sitcom High Kick Through the Roof. Her portrayal of a somewhat clumsy, but energetic college student, who is confident despite lacking money and opportunities resonated with many young adult viewers due to its accurate depiction of college students' sentiments. Regarding this breakout in her acting career, Hwang said:

You need to do what you enjoy doing as well as finding what is right for you. I realized my passion for acting during High Kick. You tend to do well when you get compliments and with director Kim Byung Wook encouraging me, I had fun acting. And because it was fun, I was able to achieve good results.

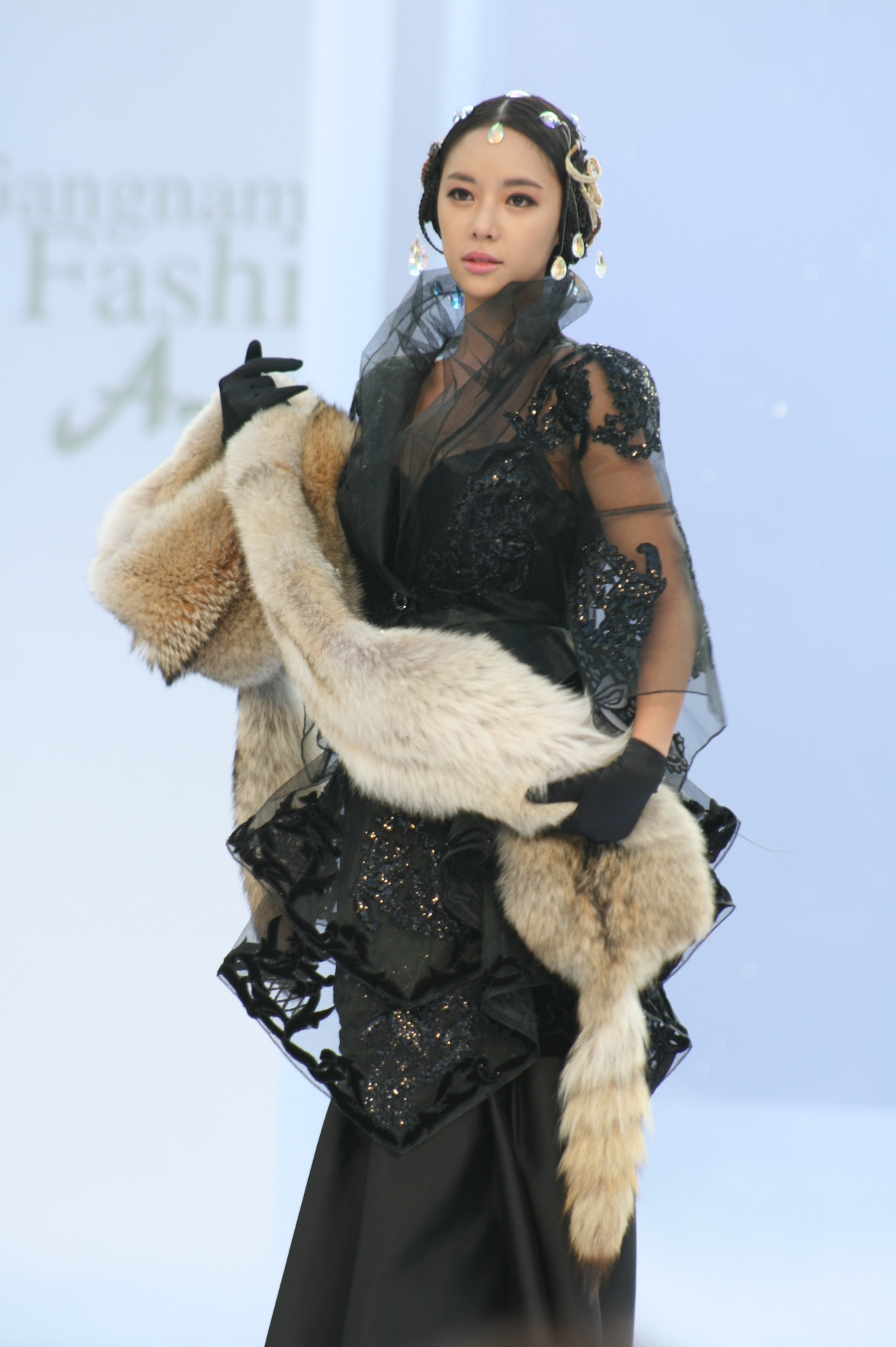
Hwang in 2009

After her role on High Kick, Hwang signed numerous advertising contracts. In several interviews, she recounts how she only had ₩487 (US$0.36) in her bank account when she started the show, but walked away with ₩1.2 billion (US$895,337.98) when it ended. She was ranked 18th on Forbes Korea's Top 40 Celebrities in 2011, and was among the Top 7 Female Commercial Stars in Korea, as compiled by Ilgan Sports.

In February, 2010, Hwang hosted MBC's Star Dance Battle alongside Kim Shin-young, Oh Sang-jin, and Shin Bong-sun. Later that year in December, she was one of the co-hosts of the annual music program SBS Gayo Daejeon with Super Junior's Kim Hee-chul, CNBLUE's Jung Yong-hwa, and 2AM's Jo Kwon.

Hwang then began to commit to acting in television series. Between 2010 and 2012, she starred in the 1970s historical epic Giant, melodrama romance Listen to My Heart, medical drama Golden Time, and romantic comedy Full House Take 2. Listen to My Heart marked Hwang's first leading role.

In 2013, Hwang was cast in crime comedy Incarnation of Money. In the same year, she starred in the hit melodrama crime series Secret Love, which achieved high TV viewership ratings. The drama resulted in Hwang winning multiple awards at the 2013 KBS Drama Awards. The following year she led the show Endless Love, a period drama set in the 1980s–1990s.

=== 2015–present: Continued success ===
In 2015, Hwang reunited with some of her former costars, namely Ji Sung from Secret Love, for the romantic comedy series Kill Me, Heal Me; then with Park Seo-joon from Kill Me, Heal Me and Go Joon-hee from Listen to My Heart for another romantic comedy, She Was Pretty. Both dramas were commercial successes and solidified her popularity outside South Korea, in countries like China. Ize magazine named her as one of the 10 Persons of the Year and Hwang was selected as Gallup Korea's Television Actor of the Year in 2015. The two MBC series won Hwang multiple awards at the 2015 MBC Drama Awards.

Hwang was cast in her first big screen leading role in the 2015 romantic comedy film My Sister, the Pig Lady, which was screened at the 39th Montreal World Film Festival as part of their World Greats selection. The film also won Grand Prize at the 2016 Osaka Asian Film Festival.

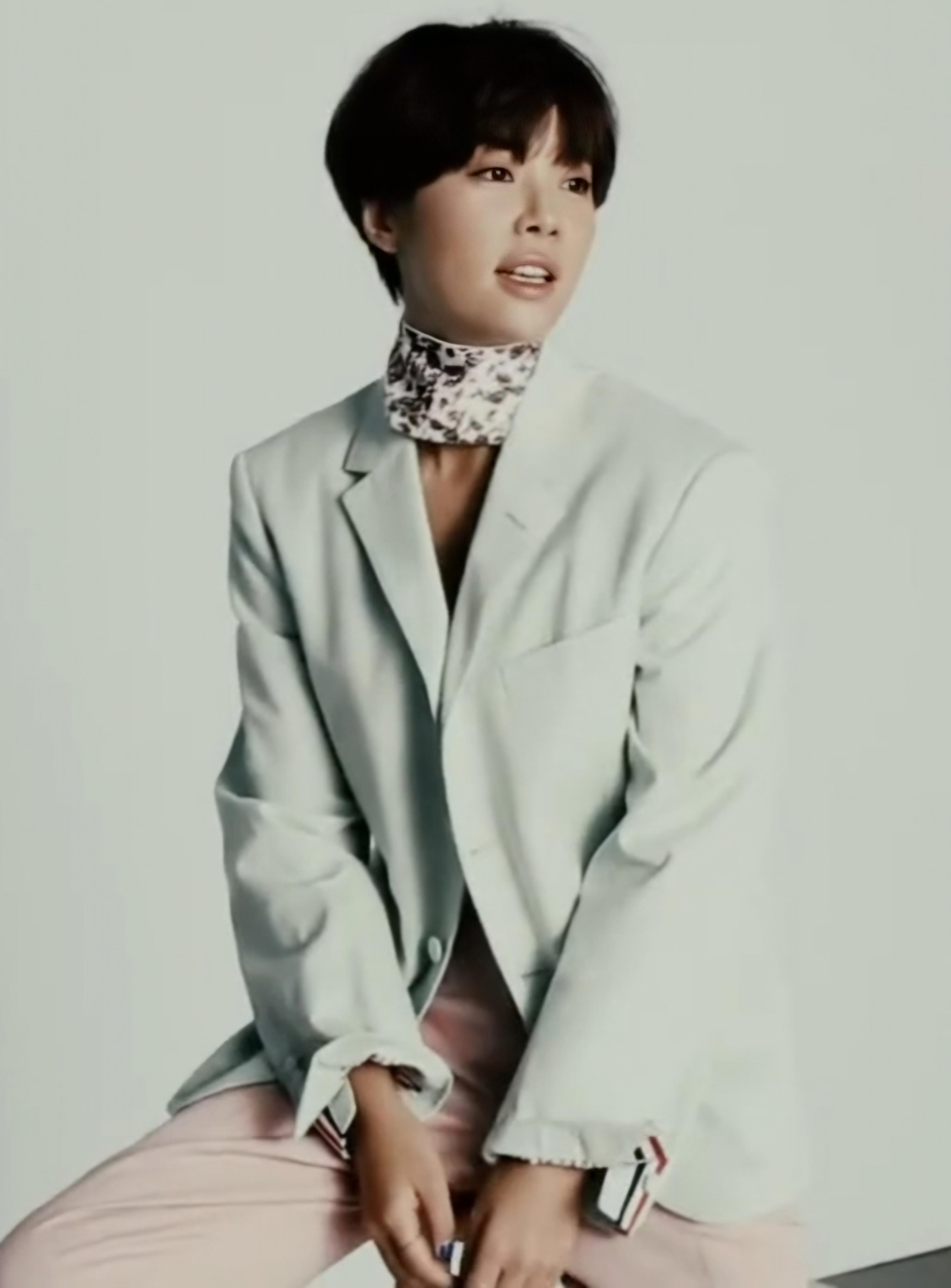
Hwang in 2017

Less than a month after her marriage, Hwang was cast in the 2016 romantic comedy series, Lucky Romance. She then reunited with Namkoong Min in the 2018 romantic comedy The Undateables, with whom she had starred alongside seven years ago in Listen to My Heart.

In 2020, Hwang was cast in two drama series – fantasy mystery Mystic Pop-up Bar and romantic comedy Men Are Men.

In 2022, Hwang accepted an offer to star in well-known screenwriter Kim Soon-ok's upcoming 2023 SBS crime mystery drama The Escape of the Seven.

In July 2023, Hwang signed with a new agency, Y.ONE Entertainment.

In 2025, Hwang admitted to embezzling more than 4.34 billion won (US$2.86 million) from a company that she owned to invest in cryptocurrency. She was subsequently sentenced to a two year prison term suspended for four years by the Jeju District Court.

== Personal life ==
=== Relationships ===
Hwang dated Kim Yong-jun for nine years. They first met in 2005, when Hwang starred in the SG Wannabe music video for My Heart's Treasure Box. The couple then publicly confirmed their relationship in January 2008. Yonhap News Agency broke the news on May 15, 2015, that the couple had ended their relationship after she wrapped up filming for Kill Me, Heal Me. Hwang later confirmed this in an interview with KBS2's Entertainment Relay.

On December 8, 2015, Hwang's agency, C-JeS Entertainment, confirmed that she had been dating Lee Young-don, a professional golfer and businessman, for the past four months. On January 7, 2016, Hwang announced her upcoming marriage to Lee, with the wedding ceremony to be held in February. On February 26, the wedding reception was held at Hotel Shilla, Seoul. In February 2017, Hwang was confirmed to be four months pregnant with her first child and gave birth to a son on August 15. On September 3, 2020, after four years of marriage, Hwang's agency C-JeS Entertainment announced that Hwang had submitted an application for divorce and would start the divorce mediation process. On July 9, 2021, her agency, C-JeS Entertainment, announced that Hwang and her husband had resolved their conflict during their divorce mediation and that the two had decided to remain as a married couple. On October 12, Hwang's agency announced that she was pregnant with her second child and expected to give birth the following year. On March 16, 2022, she gave birth to a second son. On February 22, 2024, it was confirmed that Hwang had filed for divorce from her husband for a second time. Their divorce was finalized on May 26, 2025.

On July 22, 2024, her agency confirmed that she was dating basketball player Kim Jong-kyu. On August 5, two weeks after the public confirmation of their relationship, Hwang's agency confirmed in a short statement that the two had broken-up.

== Filmography ==
=== Film ===
Year	Title	Role	Notes	Ref.
2009	The Relation of Face, Mind and Love	Eun-bin	Telecinema (Note: Also aired on SBS)	
2009	Wish	Joo-hee		
2010	Death Bell 2: Bloody Camp	Park Eun-su		
2015	My Sister, the Pig Lady	Jae-hwa		

=== Television series ===
Year	Title	Role	Notes	Ref.
2005	Princess Lulu	Mi-so	Cameo; Episode 13	
2005	Banjun Drama: "Love Virus"			
2005	Banjun Drama: "Memories of Love"			
2007	The Person I Love	Lee Jung-min		
2007	Winter Bird	Jin-ah		
2008	Last Scandal	Sa Ruby		
2008	Little Mom Scandal	Na Hye-jung		
2008	East of Eden	Kim So-jung		
2009	Two Wives	Song Ji-ho's blind date	Cameo	
2009	High Kick Through the Roof	Hwang Jung-eum		
2010	Giant	Lee Mi-joo/Cha Soo-jung		
2011	Listen to My Heart	Bong Woo-ri		
2011	High Kick: Revenge of the Short Legged	Hwang Jung-eum	Cameo; Episode 106	
2012	Golden Time	Kang Jae-in		
2012	Full House Take 2	Jang Man-ok/Michelle Jang		
2013	Incarnation of Money	Bok Jae-in		
2013	Potato Star 2013QR3	Noh Soo-dong's secretary	Cameo; Episode 1	
2013	Secret Love	Kang Yoo-jung		
2014	Endless Love	Seo In-ae		
2015	Kill Me, Heal Me	Oh Ri-jin		
2015	She Was Pretty	Kim Hye-jin		
2016	Lucky Romance	Shim Bo-nui		
2018	The Undateables	Yoo Jung-eum		
2020	Mystic Pop-up Bar	Wol-joo		
2020	Men Are Men	Seo Hyun-ju		
2023–2024	The Escape of the Seven	Geum Ra-hee		

=== Television shows ===
Year	Title	Role	Notes	Ref.
2009	We Got Married Season 2	Cast member		
2010	It City: Fukuoka Together with Hwang Jung-eum	Host		
2010	Ultra Fashion with Hwang Jung-eum	Host		

=== Music video appearances ===
Year	Title	Artist	Ref.
2005	"My Heart's Treasure Box"	SG Wannabe	
2005	"A Dreamy Conversation"	SG Wannabe	
2006	"Craze"	SG Wannabe	
2007	"I Can't Help Liking You"	Black Pearl	
2007	"Finally... It's You"	Black Pearl	
2008	"Shoes"	SeeYa	
2008	"Crazy Love Song"	SeeYa	
2009	"It's a Lie"	Ock Joo-hyun	
2009	"Did You Really Hate My Love?"	Ock Joo-hyun	
2009	"Sunflower"	Kim Jong-wook	

== Discography ==
=== Digital single ===
Release date	Title	Artist	Notes
2009-09-22	"N-Time"	Hwang Jung-eum feat. T-ara	
2011-06-11	"Good Person"	Hwang Jung-eum	from Listen to My Heart OST

=== Collaboration ===
Release date	Title	Artist	Notes
2008-09-26	"Going"	SeeYa feat. Kim Yong-jun, Hwang Jung-eum, Mario	from the album Brilliant Change
2009-06-12	"Couple"	Kim Yong-jun feat. Hwang Jung-eum	from We Got Married

== Accolades ==
=== Awards and nominations ===
Name of the award ceremony, year presented, category, nominee of the award, and the result of the nomination
Award ceremony	Year	Category	Nominee / Work	Result	Ref.
Baeksang Arts Awards	2010	Best New Actress – Television	High Kick Through the Roof	Won	
Baeksang Arts Awards	2016	Best Actress – Television	She Was Pretty	Nominated	
Barbie & Ken Awards	2010	Korean Barbie	Hwang Jung-eum	Won	
Grimae Awards	2010	Best Actress	Giant	Won	
KBS Drama Awards	2013	Best Couple Award	Hwang Jung-eum (with Ji Sung); Secret Love	Won	
KBS Drama Awards	2013	Netizen Award, Actress	Secret Love	Won	
KBS Drama Awards	2013	Top Excellence Award, Actress	Secret Love	Won	
KBS Drama Awards	2020	Excellence Award, Actress in a Miniseries	Men Are Men	Nominated	
KBS Drama Awards	2020	Top Excellence Award, Actress	Men Are Men	Nominated	
Korea Best Dresser Swan Awards	2010	Best Dressed, TV Actress category	Hwang Jung-eum	Won	
Korea Broadcasting Awards	2016	Best Actress	She Was Pretty	Won	
Korea Drama Awards	2010	Most Popular Actress	High Kick Through the Roof	Won	
Korea Drama Awards	2014	Top Excellence Award, Actress	Secret Love / Endless Love	Nominated	
Korea Drama Awards	2015	Top Excellence Award, Actress	Kill Me, Heal Me	Nominated	
Korea Drama Awards	2016	Excellence Award, Actress	Lucky Romance	Nominated	
Korea Visual Arts Festival	2010	Photogenic Award, TV Actress category	High Kick Through the Roof	Won	
MBC Drama Awards	2011	Excellence Award, Actress in a Miniseries	Listen to My Heart	Won	
MBC Drama Awards	2012	Excellence Award, Actress in a Miniseries	Golden Time	Nominated	
MBC Drama Awards	2015	PD Award	Kill Me, Heal Me / She Was Pretty	Won	
MBC Drama Awards	2015	Popularity Award, Actress	Kill Me, Heal Me / She Was Pretty	Won	
MBC Drama Awards	2015	Top 10 Stars	Kill Me, Heal Me / She Was Pretty	Won	
MBC Drama Awards	2015	Top Excellence Award, Actress in a Miniseries	Kill Me, Heal Me / She Was Pretty	Won	
MBC Drama Awards	2015	Grand Prize (Daesang)	Kill Me, Heal Me / She Was Pretty	Nominated	
MBC Drama Awards	2016	Top Excellence Award, Actress in a Miniseries	Lucky Romance	Nominated	
MBC Entertainment Awards	2009	Best Female Newcomer in Comedy/Sitcom	High Kick Through the Roof	Won	
MBC Entertainment Awards	2009	Best Female Newcomer in a Variety Show	We Got Married Season 2	Won	
Mnet 20's Choice Awards	2009	Hot Couple	Hwang Jung-eum (with Kim Yong-jun); We Got Married Season 2	Won	
SBS Drama Awards	2010	Best Couple Award	Hwang Jung-eum (with Joo Sang-wook); Giant	Won	
SBS Drama Awards	2010	New Star Award	Giant	Won	
SBS Drama Awards	2010	Best Supporting Actress in a Special Planning Drama	Giant	Nominated	
SBS Drama Awards	2013	Top Excellence Award, Actress in a Drama Special	Incarnation of Money	Nominated	
SBS Drama Awards	2014	Top 10 Stars	Endless Love	Won	
SBS Drama Awards	2014	Top Excellence Award, Actress in a Serial Drama	Endless Love	Won	
SBS Drama Awards	2018	Top Excellence Award, Actress in a Wednesday-Thursday Drama	The Undateables	Nominated	
SBS Drama Awards	2023	Top Excellence Award, Actress in a Miniseries Genre/Action Drama	The Escape of the Seven	Nominated	
Seoul International Drama Awards	2015	Outstanding Korean Actress	Kill Me, Heal Me	Won	
Seoul International Drama Awards	2021	Excellence Award, Actress	Men Are Men	Nominated	

=== Honors ===
Name of country or organization, year given, and name of honor or award
Country or organization	Year	Honor / Award	Ref.
South Korea (Note: Honors are given at the Korean Popular Culture and Arts Awards, arranged by the Korea Creative Content Agency and hosted by the Ministry of Culture, Sports and Tourism.)	2016	Prime Minister's Commendation	

=== Listicles ===
Name of publisher, year listed, name of listicle, and placement
Publisher	Year	Listicle	Placement	Ref.
Forbes	2010	Korea Power Celebrity	20th	
Forbes	2011	Korea Power Celebrity	18th	
