= Park Jae-jung =

South Korean actor

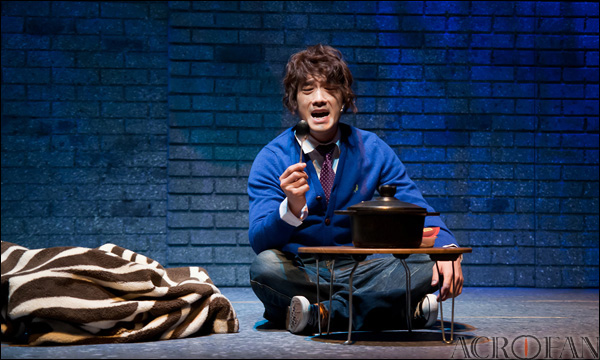
- Park in 2010
- Born: June 24, 1980 (age 46); Daegu, South Korea
- Education: Dongguk University - Business Administration
- Occupation: Actor
- Years active: 2007–present
- Agent: JF Entertainment

Korean name
- Hangul: 박재정
- RR: Bak Jaejeong
- MR: Pak Chaejŏng

Park Jae-jung (born June 24, 1980) is a South Korean actor. He played the leading role in the television dramas You Are My Destiny (2008) and Joseon Mystery Detective Jeong Yak-yong (2009). Park also appeared in the second season of reality show We Got Married where he was paired with singer-actress Uee.

== Filmography ==
=== Television series ===
| Year | Title | Role |
|---|---|---|
| 2007 | I Am Sam | Kim Woo-jin |
| 2008 | Drama City: "Love Hunt Thirty Minus Three" | Seong-wook |
| 2008 | You Are My Destiny | Kang Ho-sae |
| 2008 | Don't Ask Me About the Past | Daniel |
| 2009 | Joseon Mystery Detective Jeong Yak-yong | Jeong Yak-yong |
| 2009 | Queen Seondeok | Sadaham |
| 2010 | Coffee House | Kim Dong-wook |
| 2012 | Quiz of God 3 | Park Jong-min (guest appearance) |
| 2013 | A Tale of Two Sisters | Ahn Jung-hyo |
| 2013 | The Eldest | Lee In-ho |
| 2014 | Make Your Wish | Jang Hyun-woo |
| 2018 | The Rich Son | Kim Jong-yong |
| 2021 | Be My Dream Family | Choi Ji-wan |

=== Film ===
| Year | Title | Role |
|---|---|---|
| 2010 | Try to Remember | Eun-gyo |
| 2014 | Sketch | Chang-min |

=== Variety show ===
| Year | Title | Notes |
|---|---|---|
| 2006 | Survival Star Audition | |
| 2009 | Sang Sang Plus | |
| 2009 | We Got Married - Season 2 | Cast, paired with Uee |
| 2009 | Sunday Night - Omona, Star Theater of the Absurd! | |
| 2012 | Couple - Star Love Village | |
| 2012 | Jewelry House | |
| 2012 | The World Is Delicious | |
| 2012 | Infinity Girls | |
| 2013 | Let's Go Dream Team! Season 2 | |

=== Music video appearances ===
| Year | Song title | Artist |
|---|---|---|
| 2007 | "Farewell Trip" | Yurisangja feat. Bae Seul-ki |
| 2007 | "Time to Break Up" | Soul Star |
| 2007 | "Woman vs. Woman" | MC the Max |
| 2008 | "Drift Apart" | Sweet Sorrow |
| 2010 | "Farewell Story" | Wax |
| 2010 | "Love Is Pathetic" | Ahn Jin-kyung |

== Theater ==
| Year | Title | Role |
|---|---|---|
| 2010 | 혜화동 1번지 페스티벌 - 여기가 1번지다 | Bill |
| 2010 | The Tale of Chunhyang | Lee Mongryong |
| 2010 | The Great Catsby | Catsby |

== Awards and nominations ==
| Year | Award | Category | Nominated work | Result |
|---|---|---|---|---|
| 2008 | 3rd Asia Model Awards | CF Model Award | —N/a | Won |
| 2008 | 2nd Korea Drama Awards | Netizen Popularity Award | You Are My Destiny | Nominated |
| 2008 | KBS Drama Awards | Best New Actor | You Are My Destiny | Nominated |
| 2010 | 4th Cable TV Broadcasting Awards | Star of the Year | Jeong Yak-yong | Won |
