= She Was Pretty =

2015 South Korean television series

- Promotional poster
- Also known as: She Was Beautiful; Puzzled Lovers; Pretty Woman
- Genre: Romantic comedy; Workplace drama
- Written by: Jo Sung-hee
- Directed by: Jung Dae-yoon
- Starring: Hwang Jung-eum; Park Seo-joon; Go Joon-hee; Choi Si-won
- Music by: Kim Joon-seok; Jeong Se-rin
- Country of origin: South Korea
- Original language: Korean
- No. of episodes: 16

Production
- Executive producer: Han Hee (MBC)
- Producers: Moon Suk-hwan; Oh Kwang-hee
- Running time: 70 minutes
- Production company: Bon Factory Worldwide

Original release
- Network: MBC TV
- Release: September 16 – November 11, 2015

Related
- Pretty Li Huizhen; Kanojo wa Kirei da

She Was Pretty (Korean: 그녀는 예뻤다; RR: Geunyeoneun yeppeotda) is a 2015 South Korean television series starring Hwang Jung-eum, Park Seo-joon, Go Joon-hee and Choi Si-won. It aired on MBC from September 16 to November 11, 2015, on Wednesdays and Thursdays at 22:00 (KST).

The series was both a hit domestically, with a peak rating of 18.4% and internationally, especially in China.

== Synopsis ==
A romantic comedy, based on a true story, about two past acquaintances who meet again after they've gone through a reversal of fortunes and appearances, set against the backdrop of a fashion magazine's publishing office.

Kim Hye-jin (Hwang Jung-eum) was a beautiful girl from a rich family as a child. After her family's publishing company went bankrupt, she experienced hardships and grew into freckles and curly hair, losing the perfect features she has when she was young. Ji Sung-joon (Park Seo-joon) was an unattractive boy with low self-esteem, but grows up to be a handsome and successful editor.

The two meet again as adults, but Sung-joon didn't recognize Hye-jin. Ashamed to meet her first love and ruin his perception of her, Hye-jin asks her attractive best friend, Ha-ri (Go Joon-hee), to appear in her place. Things, however, soon get complicated as Hye-jin was assigned to work at The Most magazine publishing office where Sung-joon is the deputy chief editor. He openly mistreats and belittles her for her clumsy nature, not knowing that she was his real childhood friend. Ha-ri also continues to meet Sung-joon, and soon develops feelings for him. On the other hand, Hye-jin finds a good friend in her workplace, Shin-hyuk (Choi Si-won), who falls in love with her.

As Sung-joon gets to know Hye-jin better, he realizes there is more to the clumsy freckle-faced girl than he initially thought and it strikes him how much she reminds him of his childhood friend.

== Cast ==
=== Main ===
- Hwang Jung-eum as Kim Hye-jin / Jackson
  - Jung Da-bin as young Hye-jin

An intern in the administration section before being appointed as junior editor. She used to be a beautiful, wealthy, and smart girl, but lost everything. Embarrassed at her failures in life, she asked her best friend Ha-ri, to meet with her first love Sung-joon, using her name. She thought that would be the end of her fate with Sung-joon, but turns out it's only the beginning of her nightmare, as he then becomes her boss. Despite the misfortunes, she still strives to do her best.

- Park Seo-joon as Ji Sung-joon
  - Yang Han-yeol as young Sung-joon

The youngest deputy chief editor in Korea. Stubborn and arrogant but also brilliant in his work. Unlike Hye-jin, he was unattractive and shy but grows up to become handsome and successful. Immediately after returning to Korea, he contacted his first love, Hye-jin. He ends up falling for her even when he didn't recognize that she was his childhood friend and first love.

- Go Joon-hee as Min Ha-ri
  - Lee Ja-in as young Ha-ri

A hotelier. She is Hye-jin's best friend and roommate. A beautiful and stylish woman with good personality. While continuing to pretend to be Hye-jin, she ends up falling for Sung-joon. Fearing that her relationship with her best friend might be compromised, she tries several times to tell him the truth only to fail in the end and having Sung-joon find out first.

- Choi Si-won as Kim Shin-hyuk / Ten / David Joseph

A senior Feature editor. He is generally a free-spirited, fair, and straightforward man but with mysterious identity (later found out to be the Korean writer, Ten). He is Hye-jin's direct supervisor at work, and they developed a close relationship. He ends up falling for her even before her beauty transformation. He finds out about her relationship with Sung-joon one day when she was drunk.

=== Supporting ===
==== Hye-jin's family ====
- Park Choong-sun as Kim Jong-seob, Hye-jin's father who is currently running a small printing house.
- Lee Il-hwa as Han Jung-hye, Hye-jin's mother who also treats Ha-ri like her own daughter too.
- Jung Da-bin as Kim Hye-rin, Hye-jin's younger sister who often prefers Ha-ri as her own sister instead of Hye-jin.

==== Ha-ri's family ====
- Yoon Yoo-sun as Cha Hye-jung, Ha-ri's birth mother and Jung-hye's friend.
- Lee Byung-joon as Min Yong-gil, Ha-ri's father
- Seo Jeong-yeon as Na Ji-seon, Ha-ri's stepmother

==== People in The Most ====
- Hwang Seok-jeong as Kim Ra-ra

The chief editor who is very fashionable and later found out that she is the chairman's younger sister. She speaks English, Korean, Italian, French and Spanish.

- Shin Dong-mi as Cha Joo-young

Head of the Editing team and director of the Fashion team who is so dedicated to her work. She speaks on behalf of Hye-jin during her initial days and later becomes the deputy chief editor.

- Ahn Se-ha as Kim Poong-ho

A lazy and untidy Feature director who orders his junior coworkers around. It is revealed later that he is the Jinsung Magazine CEO's son and eventually becomes the Vice President.

- Shin Hye-sun as Han Seol

An assistant of the Beauty team who finds out about the fact that the chairman's son is one of her co-workers and sets out to become his love interest. She then dates Joon-woo and eventually falls for his friendly charms.

- Park Yu-hwan as Kim Joon-woo

A cute and kind assistant of the Fashion team who had feelings for Han Seol from the day when she mistakes him as the chairman's son and reciprocates his feelings. He always respects his co-workers and it is later revealed that his parent is the owner of a laundry place.

- Kang Soo-jin as Joo Ah-reum

The editor of the Beauty team who is getting married.

- Cha Jung-won as Jung Sun-min
- Bae Min-jung as Park Yi-kyung
- Kim Jung-heon as Se-hoon
- Im Ji-hyun as Lee Eun-young

==== People in Jinsung Magazine ====
- Kim Ha-kyoon as Boo Joong-man

Head of the Management team who encourages Hye-jin when she gets transfer to the editing team.

- Jo Chang-geun as Kwang-hee, an employee of the Management team.
- Jin Hye-won as Lee Seul-bi, an employee of the Management team.

=== Special appearances ===
- Im Kang-sung as Ha-ri's date
- Kim Sung-oh as the man at pub (ep. 3)
- Hwang Seok-jeong as the ajumma in the restaurant on (ep. 7)
- Kim Je-dong as The Most 20th Anniversary's party MC (ep. 9)
- Lee Joon-gi as the guest for The Most 20th Anniversary (ep. 9)
- Seo In-guk as the guest for The Most 20th Anniversary (ep. 9)
- Uee as the guest for The Most 20th Anniversary (ep. 9)
- Park Hyung-sik as the guest for The Most 20th Anniversary (ep. 9)
- Lee Sang-hoon as interviewee for Editor Kim (ep. 11)
- Kim Bo-min as Ji Yeon-woo, Sung-joon and Hye-jin's daughter (ep. 16)

== Production ==
The first script reading was held on August 10, 2015.

The drama reunited Hwang Jung-eum with Park Seo-joon, who previously starred together in Kill Me, Heal Me; and Hwang Jung-eum with Go Joon-hee, who previously starred together in Listen to My Heart.

== Original soundtrack ==
She was Pretty OST

Soundtrack album by Various artists
- Recorded: 2015
- Genre: Soundtrack
- Languages: Korean; English
- Labels: Loen Entertainment; Bon Factory

=== Part 1 ===
Released on November 23, 2015
No.	Title	Artist	Length
1.	"Thumping" (쿵쿵쿵)	Kim Min-seung	3:25
2.	"Thumping" (Inst.)		3:25
Total length:			6:50

=== Part 2 ===
Released on September 24, 2015
No.	Title	Artist	Length
1.	"Sometimes" (가끔)	Zia	3:56
2.	"Sometimes" (Inst.)		3:56
Total length:			7:32

=== Part 3 ===
Released on September 30, 2015
No.	Title	Artist	Length
1.	"One More Step" (한 걸음 더)	Yoo Ki-hyun(Monsta X)	3:25
2.	"One More Step" (Inst.)		3:25
Total length:			6:50

=== Part 4 ===
Released on October 14, 2015
No.	Title	Artist	Length
1.	"You don't know me" (모르나봐)	So-yu (Sistar) & Brother Su	4:18
2.	"You don't know me" (Inst.)		4:18
Total length:			4:36

=== Part 5 ===
Released on October 22, 2015
No.	Title	Artist	Length
1.	"You're the only one" (너뿐이야)	Choi Si-won	4:12
2.	"You're the only one" (Inst.)		4:12
Total length:			8:24

=== Part 6 ===
Released on November 6, 2015
No.	Title	Artist	Length
1.	"Long Way" (먼 길)	Park Seo-joon	3:41
2.	"Long Way" (Inst.)		3:41
Total length:			7:42

Disc 2:
No.	Title	Artist	Length
1.	"She was Pretty (Opening Theme)"	Various Artists	2:44
2.	"A Reporter"	Various Artists	1:33
3.	"A Heart that cannot be"	Various Artists	2:28
4.	"Come on"	Various Artists	2:17
5.	"Find hidden puzzles"	Various Artists	3:51
6.	"Found my Umbrella"	Various Artists	2:59
7.	"Her Identity"	Various Artists	1:57
8.	"Hole Socky"	Various Artists	3:41
9.	"I missed you"	Various Artists	3:46
10.	"It's not normal"	Various Artists	2:32
11.	"It tends to embarrass"	Various Artists	2:04
12.	"Let's Start"	Various Artists	1:28
13.	"My Lost Request"	Various Artists	2:33
14.	"Memories of first love"	Various Artists	2:47
15.	"My favourite person now"	Various Artists	2:51
16.	"My Sister"	Various Artists	2:14
17.	"Onion's Love"	Various Artists	3:05
18.	"Our Story"	Various Artists	2:20
19.	"Restlessness"	Various Artists	1:46
20.	"The Most"	Various Artists	1:49
21.	"Unknown feelings"	Various Artists	2:45
22.	"UnPoco UnPoco"	Various Artists	1:44
23.	"Violet Memory"	Various Artists	1:45
24.	"Wakeup"	Various Artists	1:59
25.	"Who, is it you?"	Various Artists	2:13
26.	"You cannot get it"	Various Artists	2:03
27.	"You can cry"	Various Artists	3:12

== Ratings ==
Ep.	Original broadcast date	Average audience share				
Ep.	Original broadcast date	TNmS		Nielsen Korea		Highest Internet Ratings
Ep.	Original broadcast date	Nationwide	Seoul	Nationwide	Seoul	Highest Internet Ratings
1	September 16, 2015	4.9% (NR)	5.8% (NR)	4.8% (NR)	5.0% (NR)	14.7% (2nd)
2	September 17, 2015	7.1% (NR)	8.1% (15th)	7.2% (NR)	7.8% (17th)	22.3% (2nd)
3	September 23, 2015	8.0% (18th)	9.1% (11th)	8.5% (14th)	9.4% (11th)	29.7% (2nd)
4	September 24, 2015	7.8% (19th)	8.8% (15th)	9.9% (11th)	9.9% (11th)	31.4% (2nd)
5	September 30, 2015	9.0% (16th)	10.8% (8th)	10.7% (8th)	11.9% (8th)	40.0% (1st)
6	October 1, 2015	8.4% (19th)	10.4% (10th)	10.2% (17th)	11.3% (9th)	39.0% (1st)
7	October 7, 2015	11.8% (8th)	13.7% (5th)	13.1% (6th)	14.2% (3rd)	46.9% (1st)
8	October 8, 2015	13.2% (6th)	15.4% (2nd)	14.5% (3rd)	16.3% (3rd)	49.7% (1st)
9	October 15, 2015	16.2% (2nd)	19.1% (2nd)	16.7% (3rd)	17.9% (2nd)	59.4% (1st)
10	October 21, 2015	15.3% (4th)	17.4% (2nd)	17.3% (2nd)	19.7% (2nd)	59.6% (1st)
11	October 22, 2015	17.2% (2nd)	19.7% (2nd)	17.7% (2nd)	19.2% (2nd)	59.8% (1st)
12	October 28, 2015	15.5% (4th)	17.8% (2nd)	16.5% (3rd)	17.9% (2nd)	58.6% (1st)
13	October 29, 2015	15.0% (4th)	17.5% (2nd)	18.0% (2nd)	19.8% (2nd)	56.0% (1st)
14	November 4, 2015	15.3% (3rd)	17.4% (1st)	15.9% (3rd)	17.8% (2nd)	58.0% (1st)
15	November 5, 2015	15.0% (3rd)	17.8% (2nd)	16.9% (2nd)	18.7% (2nd)	52.8% (1st)
16	November 11, 2015	15.0% (2nd)	17.7% (1st)	15.9% (3rd)	17.7% (2nd)	—N/a
Average		12.2%	14.2%	13.4%	14.7%	—
In the table above, the blue numbers represent the lowest ratings and the red numbers represent the highest ratings.; NR denotes that the drama did not rank in the top 20 daily programs on that date.

== Awards and nominations ==
Year	Award	Category	Recipient	Result
2015	4th APAN Star Awards	Excellence Award, Actor in a Miniseries	Park Seo-joon	Nominated
2015	4th APAN Star Awards	Best Supporting Actress	Hwang Seok-jeong	Nominated
2015	Grimae Awards	Excellence in Drama Award	Lee Jin-seok, Roh Hyeong-sik	Won
2015	Grimae Awards	Best Lighting Director Award	Kim Yong-sam	Won
2015	MBC Drama Awards	Grand Prize (Daesang)	Hwang Jung-eum	Nominated
2015	MBC Drama Awards	Drama of the Year	She Was Pretty	Nominated
2015	MBC Drama Awards	PD Choice Award	Hwang Jung-eum	Won
2015	MBC Drama Awards	Top Excellence Award, Actress in a Miniseries	Hwang Jung-eum	Won
2015	MBC Drama Awards	Excellence Award, Actor in a Miniseries	Park Seo-joon	Won
2015	MBC Drama Awards	Excellence Award, Actor in a Miniseries	Choi Siwon	Nominated
2015	MBC Drama Awards	Excellence Award, Actress in a Miniseries	Go Joon-hee	Nominated
2015	MBC Drama Awards	Top 10 Stars	Hwang Jung-eum	Won
2015	MBC Drama Awards	Top 10 Stars	Park Seo-joon	Won
2015	MBC Drama Awards	Best Supporting Actor in a Miniseries	Ahn Se-ha	Nominated
2015	MBC Drama Awards	Best Supporting Actress in a Miniseries	Hwang Seok-jeong	Won
2015	MBC Drama Awards	Best Supporting Actress in a Miniseries	Shin Dong-mi	Nominated
2015	MBC Drama Awards	Best New Actor in a Miniseries	Park Yu-hwan	Nominated
2015	MBC Drama Awards	Best New Actress in a Miniseries	Shin Hye-sun	Nominated
2015	MBC Drama Awards	Best Young Actor	Yang Han-yeol	Won
2015	MBC Drama Awards	Popularity Award, Actor	Park Seo-joon	Won
2015	MBC Drama Awards	Popularity Award, Actress	Hwang Jung-eum	Won
2015	MBC Drama Awards	Writer of the Year	Jo Sung-hee	Won
2016	52nd Baeksang Arts Awards	Best Drama	She Was Pretty	Nominated
2016	52nd Baeksang Arts Awards	Best Director	Jung Dae-yoon	Nominated
2016	52nd Baeksang Arts Awards	Best Actress	Hwang Jung-eum	Nominated
2016	43rd Korea Broadcasting Awards	Best Drama	She Was Pretty	Won
2016	43rd Korea Broadcasting Awards	Best Actress	Hwang Jung-eum	Won

== Remake ==
- A Turkish remake of the drama, titled Seviyor Sevmiyor was aired in 2016 on ATV (Turkey).
- A Chinese remake of the drama, titled Pretty Li Hui Zhen started airing on Hunan TV in 2017.
- A Vietnamese remake of the drama, titled Mối Tình Đầu Của Tôi (My First Love) started airing on VTV3 in 2019.
- A Japanese remake of the drama, titled Kanojo wa Kirei Datta (lit. She Was Pretty) was aired in 2021 on Fuji TV.
- A Thai remake of the drama, titled รักวุ่นวายยัยตัวป่วน (Me Always You) was aired in 2021 on Channel 3 (Thailand).
- A Malaysian remake of the drama, which is also titled She Was Pretty [ms] started streaming in 2022 on Viu.
- A Mexican remake of the drama, titled Cuando fui bonita (When I Was Pretty) is set to air in 2026 on Canal 5.
- A Sri Lankan remake of the drama, titled එයත් ලස්සනයි - Eyath Lassanai (She is also pretty) is set to air in 2026 on Siyatha TV (Sri Lankan Chanel)
