= You Are My Destiny (2008 TV series) =

2008 South Korean television series

- Also known as: You Are My Life
- Genre: Drama; Romance; Soap opera
- Created by: KBS Drama Production
- Written by: Moon Eun-ah
- Directed by: Kim Myung-wook
- Starring: Im Yoon-ah; Park Jae-jung; Lee Ji-hoon; Gong Hyun-joo
- Country of origin: South Korea
- No. of episodes: 178

Production
- Running time: 30 minutes
- Production company: KBS Drama Production

Original release
- Network: KBS1
- Release: May 5, 2008 – January 9, 2009

You Are My Destiny (Korean: 너는 내 운명; RR: Neoneun nae unmyeong) is a South Korean television series television series that aired on KBS1 from May 5, 2008 to January 9, 2009 on Mondays to Fridays at 20:25 for 178 episodes. Starring Im Yoon-ah, Park Jae-jung, Lee Ji-hoon and Gong Hyun-joo, the rating of the drama started at more than 20% in the first episode, and kept increasing. It reached a peak viewership rating of 41.6% in its final episode and was a huge success overall in Korea and many other Asian countries.

Im Yoon-ah is a member of the K-pop group Girls' Generation, and this was her first leading role.

== Plot ==
Jang Sae-byuk is a cheerful and grateful orphan who always tries her best. She dreams of one day becoming an interior designer, despite her lack of education and money. Because of an accident that happened before the story starts (about three years ago), she loses her sight and undergoes corneal transplant surgery. Different events unravel when she encounters the Kim family, who has lost a daughter in a horrible car crash, unbeknownst to everyone besides the father and older brother. The stories then intertwine when Sae-byuk meets the Kim's extended family and the son of a big interior design company, Lohas, in Korea.

== Cast ==
- Im Yoon-ah as Jang Sae-byuk, a milk delivering woman who finds her way through Lohas' design competition
- Park Jae-jung as Kang Ho-sae, manager of Rohas, a company specializing in making kitchen sets
- Lee Ji-hoon as Kim Tae-poong
- Gong Hyun-joo as Kim Su-bin (Kim Tae-pung and Kim Tae-young's cousin)
- Lee Pil-mo as Kim Tae-young. Tae-young is a teacher at a course institution
- Jang Yong as Kim Dae-jin (Tae-pung's father). Dae-jin owns a mover service company, Pung Express. Before establishing Pung Express, Dae-jin was the Kang family's driver.
- Jung Ae-ri as Oh Young-sook (Tae-pung's mother). Works at a food catering company owned by Lee Hwa-ran for some time. Used to work as a housemaid at the Kang family's house.
- Kim Hyo-seo as Kim Na-young (Tae-pung's deceased twin sister).
- Sa Mi-ja as Son Poong-geum (Dae-gu's and Dae-jin's mother).
- Kang Seok-woo as Kim Dae-gu (Su-bin's father). He worked as a mayor.
- Lee Hye-sook as Hong Yeon-sil (Su-bin's mother). Nosy and gossipy.
- Lee Seol-ah as Kang Yu-ri (Ho-sae's sister).
- Hyun Seok as Kang Chil-bok (Ho-sae's father). Chil-bok is the president of Lohas.
- Yang Geum-seok as Seo Min-jung (Ho-sae's mother).
- Kim Hyung-il as Kang Charles (Chil-bok's brother / Yeon-sil's dance tutor)
- Kim Jung-nan as Ban So-young (Tae-young's love interest and Yun-hui's single mother)
- Park Min-ji as Ban Yun-hui (So-young's daughter)
- Sunwoo Yong-nyeo as Lee Hwa-ran (So-young's mother). She owns a food catering company named "Sandeul Bada".
- Choi Won-young as Nam Gyeong-woo (Na-young's boyfriend). He survived the accident they were in together.
- Park Seul-gi as Bok-ju (Sae-byuk's best friend). Ditched Sae-byuk and stole her money. Sae-byuk later sees her in town and finds out why she left.
- Kwak Hyun-hwa as Oh Sun-jeong (female Lohas employee).
- Lee Jung-ho as Lee Dong-soo (male Lohas employee).
- Yoo Hye-ri as Jeong Mi-ok (Sae-byuk's biological mother).
- Jung Jae-gon as Jo Sang-ki (Yun-hui's biological father).
- Kim Sung-hoon as Jang Pan-jae (night sales manager).
- Shin Pyo as assistant director.

== Viewership ==
In the tables below, the blue numbers represent the lowest ratings and the red numbers represent the highest ratings. Source: AGB Nielsen

Episode	Date	Average audience share	
Episode	Date	Nationwide	Seoul
1	May 5, 2008	23.4% (2nd)	21.9% (2nd)
2	May 6, 2008	23.4% (2nd)	22.7% (3rd)
3	May 7, 2008	23.1% (2nd)	23.2% (2nd)
4	May 8, 2008	20.4% (2nd)	20.0% (2nd)
5	May 9, 2008	22.5% (1st)	21.4% (1st)
6	May 12, 2008	19.2% (2nd)	18.3% (2nd)
7	May 13, 2008	24.7% (2nd)	23.3% (2nd)
8	May 14, 2008	22.7% (2nd)	21.3% (2nd)
9	May 15, 2008	22.8% (2nd)	21.8% (2nd)
10	May 16, 2008	18.3% (1st)	18.6% (1st)
11	May 19, 2008	24.8% (2nd)	23.7% (2nd)
12	May 20, 2008	22.4% (2nd)	21.5% (2nd)
13	May 21, 2008	21.2% (1st)	20.1% (1st)
14	May 22, 2008	19.9% (1st)	19.3% (1st)
15	May 23, 2008	20.5% (1st)	19.5% (1st)
16	May 26, 2008	22.1% (2nd)	21.7% (2nd)
17	May 27, 2008	23.4% (2nd)	23.2% (2nd)
18	May 28, 2008	21.4% (1st)	20.4% (1st)
19	May 29, 2008	21.4% (1st)	21.6% (1st)
20	May 30, 2008	20.6% (1st)	19.9% (1st)
21	June 2, 2008	24.1% (2nd)	23.1% (2nd)
22	June 3, 2008	23.6% (2nd)	22.3% (2nd)
23	June 4, 2008	24.2% (1st)	23.0% (1st)
24	June 5, 2008	21.0% (1st)	19.9% (1st)
25	June 6, 2008	21.1% (1st)	19.3% (1st)
26	June 9, 2008	23.7% (2nd)	23.0% (2nd)
27	June 10, 2008	22.3% (2nd)	20.6% (2nd)
28	June 11, 2008	22.6% (1st)	21.1% (1st)
29	June 12, 2008	22.9% (2nd)	21.5% (2nd)
30	June 13, 2008	20.7% (1st)	19.9% (1st)
31	June 16, 2008	23.7% (2nd)	22.0% (2nd)
32	June 17, 2008	24.7% (1st)	23.1% (1st)
33	June 18, 2008	25.2% (1st)	23.1% (2nd)
34	June 19, 2008	22.3% (2nd)	20.5% (2nd)
35	June 20, 2008	23.1% (1st)	21.5% (1st)
36	June 23, 2008	23.9% (1st)	21.4% (1st)
37	June 24, 2008	25.0% (1st)	23.6% (1st)
38	June 25, 2008	23.4% (1st)	21.4% (2nd)
39	June 26, 2008	23.8% (2nd)	22.0% (2nd)
40	June 27, 2008	21.8% (1st)	19.5% (1st)
41	June 30, 2008	25.9% (1st)	24.2% (1st)
42	July 1, 2008	23.8% (1st)	22.7% (1st)
43	July 2, 2008	25.8% (1st)	24.4% (2nd)
44	July 3, 2008	23.4% (2nd)	21.0% (2nd)
45	July 4, 2008	24.3% (1st)	23.1% (1st)
46	July 7, 2008	26.8% (1st)	26.2% (1st)
47	July 8, 2008	24.3% (1st)	22.8% (1st)
48	July 9, 2008	24.0% (2nd)	22.4% (2nd)
49	July 10, 2008	24.2% (2nd)	22.3% (2nd)
50	July 11, 2008	23.7% (1st)	22.1% (1st)
51	July 14, 2008	27.3% (1st)	25.2% (1st)
52	July 15, 2008	25.1% (1st)	23.5% (1st)
53	July 16, 2008	24.8% (2nd)	23.0% (2nd)
54	July 17, 2008	24.7% (2nd)	23.5% (2nd)
55	July 18, 2008	24.5% (1st)	23.3% (1st)
56	July 21, 2008	25.0% (1st)	23.3% (2nd)
57	July 22, 2008	25.1% (1st)	23.4% (1st)
58	July 23, 2008	26.3% (2nd)	25.5% (2nd)
59	July 24, 2008	28.8% (2nd)	28.3% (2nd)
60	July 25, 2008	26.8% (1st)	25.2% (1st)
61	July 28, 2008	27.0% (1st)	24.9% (1st)
62	July 29, 2008	26.1% (1st)	23.9% (2nd)
63	July 30, 2008	25.4% (2nd)	24.3% (2nd)
64	July 31, 2008	24.8% (2nd)	23.6% (2nd)
65	August 1, 2008	24.5% (1st)	23.6% (1st)
66	August 4, 2008	27.8% (1st)	25.8% (1st)
67	August 5, 2008	28.9% (1st)	28.3% (1st)
68	August 6, 2008	25.6% (1st)	24.5% (1st)
69	August 7, 2008	25.9% (1st)	24.2% (1st)
70	August 11, 2008	25.2% (1st)	23.9% (2nd)
71	August 12, 2008	21.6% (1st)	20.4% (1st)
72	August 13, 2008	23.6% (3rd)	22.7% (3rd)
73	August 14, 2008	26.4% (1st)	25.2% (1st)
74	August 18, 2008	28.4% (1st)	27.6% (1st)
75	August 19, 2008	30.2% (1st)	28.9% (1st)
76	August 20, 2008	29.5% (1st)	28.8% (1st)
77	August 21, 2008	27.8% (1st)	26.3% (1st)
78	August 22, 2008	29.8% (1st)	28.4% (1st)
79	August 25, 2008	29.8% (1st)	28.1% (1st)
80	August 26, 2008	30.0% (1st)	29.0% (1st)
81	August 27, 2008	28.9% (1st)	27.6% (1st)
82	August 28, 2008	29.5% (1st)	27.9% (1st)
83	August 29, 2008	28.5% (1st)	27.3% (1st)
84	September 1, 2008	32.7% (1st)	31.0% (1st)
85	September 2, 2008	27.9% (1st)	25.5% (1st)
86	September 3, 2008	28.0% (1st)	26.4% (1st)
87	September 4, 2008	28.7% (1st)	26.9% (1st)
88	September 5, 2008	26.4% (1st)	24.4% (1st)
89	September 8, 2008	28.8% (1st)	27.5% (1st)
90	September 9, 2008	27.1% (1st)	26.1% (2nd)
91	September 10, 2008	27.6% (1st)	27.0% (1st)
92	September 11, 2008	27.6% (1st)	26.2% (1st)
93	September 12, 2008	25.9% (1st)	24.2% (1st)
94	September 15, 2008	26.6% (1st)	25.0% (1st)
95	September 16, 2008	28.9% (1st)	27.3% (2nd)
96	September 17, 2008	27.7% (1st)	26.9% (1st)
97	September 18, 2008	29.6% (1st)	28.6% (1st)
98	September 19, 2008	27.6% (1st)	26.3% (1st)
99	September 22, 2008	32.0% (1st)	30.3% (1st)
100	September 23, 2008	29.8% (1st)	28.7% (1st)
101	September 24, 2008	28.8% (1st)	26.3% (1st)
102	September 25, 2008	29.1% (1st)	27.9% (1st)
103	September 26, 2008	26.7% (1st)	25.9% (1st)
104	September 29, 2008	30.5% (1st)	28.5% (1st)
105	September 30, 2008	30.2% (1st)	28.1% (2nd)
106	October 1, 2008	30.2% (1st)	29.0% (1st)
107	October 2, 2008	27.6% (1st)	26.0% (1st)
108	October 3, 2008	28.5% (1st)	26.7% (1st)
109	October 6, 2008	29.6% (1st)	27.7% (1st)
110	October 7, 2008	28.9% (1st)	28.3% (1st)
111	October 8, 2008	27.5%(1st)	26.1% (1st)
112	October 9, 2008	27.9% (1st)	27.2% (1st)
113	October 10, 2008	28.3% (1st)	26.5% (1st)
114	October 13, 2008	30.3% (1st)	28.7% (1st)
115	October 14, 2008	28.6% (1st)	26.9% (2nd)
116	October 15, 2008	27.5% (1st)	25.8% (1st)
117	October 16, 2008	27.8% (1st)	26.9% (1st)
118	October 17, 2008	28.4% (1st)	28.7% (1st)
119	October 20, 2008	27.8% (2nd)	25.8% (2nd)
120	October 21, 2008	29.3% (1st)	27.4% (2nd)
121	October 22, 2008	30.2% (1st)	28.8% (1st)
122	October 23, 2008	28.6% (1st)	27.6% (1st)
123	October 24, 2008	26.8% (1st)	25.1% (1st)
124	October 27, 2008	28.3% (1st)	26.9% (1st)
125	October 28, 2008	28.6% (1st)	27.1% (1st)
126	October 29, 2008	26.6% (1st)	24.3% (1st)
127	October 30, 2008	29.4% (1st)	27.3% (1st)
128	October 31, 2008	26.9% (1st)	24.8% (1st)
129	November 3, 2008	30.6% (1st)	28.5% (1st)
130	November 4, 2008	31.0% (1st)	29.0% (1st)
131	November 5, 2008	30.1% (1st)	28.6% (1st)
132	November 6, 2008	28.1% (1st)	26.2% (1st)
133	November 7, 2008	28.9% (1st)	26.5% (1st)
134	November 10, 2008	31.0% (1st)	28.7% (1st)
135	November 11, 2008	29.8% (1st)	27.0% (1st)
136	November 12, 2008	30.4% (1st)	28.0% (1st)
137	November 13, 2008	30.8% (1st)	29.0% (1st)
138	November 14, 2008	32.0% (1st)	30.2% (1st)
139	November 17, 2008	35.3% (1st)	32.5% (1st)
140	November 18, 2008	37.1% (1st)	35.1% (1st)
141	November 19, 2008	35.8% (1st)	33.8% (1st)
142	November 20, 2008	34.3% (1st)	32.5% (1st)
143	November 21, 2008	35.8% (1st)	34.6% (1st)
144	November 24, 2008	36.7% (1st)	34.3% (1st)
145	November 25, 2008	35.6% (1st)	33.5% (1st)
146	November 26, 2008	37.2% (1st)	35.4% (1st)
147	November 27, 2008	38.2% (1st)	37.1% (1st)
148	November 28, 2008	36.7% (1st)	34.8% (1st)
149	December 1, 2008	36.3% (1st)	35.0% (1st)
150	December 2, 2008	35.3% (1st)	33.4% (1st)
151	December 3, 2008	35.7% (1st)	34.0% (1st)
152	December 4, 2008	36.1% (1st)	34.5% (1st)
153	December 5, 2008	36.0% (1st)	34.3% (1st)
154	December 8, 2008	37.0% (1st)	35.4% (1st)
155	December 9, 2008	35.7% (1st)	34.4% (1st)
156	December 10, 2008	33.9% (1st)	32.4% (1st)
157	December 11, 2008	38.1% (1st)	36.9% (1st)
158	December 12, 2008	28.6% (1st)	27.0% (1st)
159	December 15, 2008	39.0% (1st)	37.0% (1st)
160	December 16, 2008	37.6% (1st)	35.9% (1st)
161	December 17, 2008	37.3% (1st)	35.4% (1st)
162	December 18, 2008	36.5% (1st)	34.7% (1st)
163	December 19, 2008	36.3% (1st)	35.0% (1st)
164	December 22, 2008	39.4% (1st)	37.0% (1st)
165	December 23, 2008	38.4% (1st)	36.4% (1st)
166	December 24, 2008	33.1% (1st)	31.4% (1st)
167	December 25, 2008	38.6% (1st)	35.6% (1st)
168	December 26, 2008	38.0% (1st)	35.9% (1st)
169	December 29, 2008	38.4% (1st)	36.0% (1st)
170	December 30, 2008	37.6% (1st)	36.2% (1st)
171	December 31, 2008	34.6% (1st)	33.4% (1st)
172	January 1, 2009	38.6% (1st)	36.6% (1st)
173	January 2, 2009	39.3% (1st)	37.6% (1st)
174	January 3, 2009	41.6% (1st)	38.9% (1st)
175	January 4, 2009	39.6% (1st)	37.8% (1st)

== Awards ==
2008 2nd Korea Drama Awards

- Netizen Popularity Award: Im Yoon-ah

2008 KBS Drama Awards

- Netizen Award: Im Yoon-ah
- Best New Actress: Im Yoon-ah
- Excellence Award, Actor in a Daily Drama: Lee Pil-mo
- Excellence Award, Actress in a Daily Drama: Kim Jung-nan

2009 45th Baeksang Arts Awards

- Most Popular Actress (TV): Im Yoon-ah
- Best New Actress (TV): Im Yoon-ah
