= Jang Young-chul =

South Korean television screenwriter

- Born: South Korea
- Education: Chungbuk National University - Korean Language and Literature
- Occupation: Screenwriter
- Years active: 1994-present
- Agent: Celltrion Entertainment
- Spouse: Jung Kyung-soon (m. 2005)

Korean name
- Hangul: 장영철
- RR: Jang Yeongcheol
- MR: Chang Yŏngch'ŏl

Jang Young-chul (Korean: 장영철) is a South Korean television screenwriter. He is best known for writing the hit dramas Giant and History of a Salaryman.

== Career ==
Jang Young-chul graduated from Chungbuk National University with a degree in Korean Language and Literature.

In 1994, he won at the KBS Drama Script Contest for Father's House (아버지의 집), followed by another win in 1995 at newspaper Seoul Shinmun's New Year Literary Contest for his script A Room With a View (전망좋은 방). After winning at a 1996 contest, Jang's script Golden Garden (황금빛 정원) was produced as a Best Theater episode on MBC.

Jang was hired by SBS to write his first miniseries in 2002, Affection starring Kim Ji-ho and Yoo Jun-sang. He and Affection co-writer Jung Kyung-soon married in 2005.

He began to gain attention in the TV industry when he wrote the historical epic Dae Jo-yeong (2006-2007), which starred Choi Soo-jong as the titular founder of the state of Balhae. Jang received recognition as Best Writer at the KBS Drama Awards and the Korea PD Awards.

After Dae Jo-yeong, he and wife Jung Kyung-soon became writing partners again, and they would become best known for their collaborations with director Yoo In-shik—the hit dramas Giant and History of a Salaryman. Giant (2010), starring Lee Beom-soo, Park Jin-hee, Joo Sang-wook, Hwang Jung-eum, Park Sang-min and Jeong Bo-seok, is a period drama about three siblings' quest for revenge during the economic boom of 1970-80s Korea, as their fates play out against a larger tide of power, money, politics, and the growth of a city. History of a Salaryman (2011-2012), starring Lee Beom-soo, Jung Ryeo-won, Jung Gyu-woon, Hong Soo-hyun, Lee Deok-hwa and Kim Seo-hyung, is a quirky comedy and murder mystery about an ordinary salaryman who finds himself involved with corporate spies and rival pharmaceutical companies, and also a parody of modern office politics using the historical events during China's Chu–Han Contention as satire.

Jang, Jung, and Yoo also worked together on the less successful Incarnation of Money (2013), which starred Kang Ji-hwan, Hwang Jung-eum, Park Sang-min, Choi Yeo-jin, Oh Yoon-ah and Kim Soo-mi, and focused on the greed and corruption in Korean society involving prosecutors, lobbyists and loan sharks.

The period drama Empress Ki, which aired from 2013 to 2014, starred Ha Ji-won in the title role as a Goryeo woman who becomes an empress of the Yuan dynasty, depicting her loves and political ambitions as she is torn between the two countries. It did well in the ratings, despite controversy regarding its historical accuracy and fictionalized elements. Ha won the Grand Prize ("Daesang") at the MBC Drama Awards, with Jang and Jung also securing Writer/s of the Year.

== Filmography ==
- Ricky (2026)
- Goguryeo Gaemamusa (TBA)
- Big Mouth (MBC, 2022)
- Vagabond (SBS, 2019)
- Monster (MBC, 2016)
- Empress Ki (MBC, 2013–2014)
- Incarnation of Money (SBS, 2013)
- History of a Salaryman (SBS, 2012)
- Giant (SBS, 2010)
- Dae Jo-yeong (KBS1, 2006–2007)
- New Human Market (SBS, 2004)
- Affection (SBS, 2002)

== Awards ==
- 2013 MBC Drama Awards: Writer/s of the Year shared with Jung Kyung-soon (Empress Ki)
- 2011 38th Korea Broadcasting Awards: Best Writer (Giant)
- 2008 20th Korea PD Awards: Best Writer, TV category (Dae Jo-yeong)
- 2007 KBS Drama Awards: Best Writer (Dae Jo-yeong)
