= 2010 SBS Drama Awards =

18th edition of award ceremony

- Date: December 31, 2010
- Site: SBS Open Hall, Deungchon-dong, Seoul
- Hosted by: Lee Beom-soo; Park Jin-hee; Lee Soo-kyung

Television coverage
- Network: SBS

The 2010 SBS Drama Awards is a ceremony honoring the best performances in television on the SBS network for the year 2010. It took place on December 31, 2010, at the SBS Open Hall in Deungchon-dong, Seoul, and was hosted by Lee Beom-soo, Park Jin-hee and Lee Soo-kyung.

== Nominations and winners ==
(Winners denoted in bold)

Grand Prize (Daesang)	Drama of the Year
**Go Hyun-jung** – **Big Thing as Seo Hye-rim**	**Giant**
Top Excellence Award, Actor in a Drama Special	Top Excellence Award, Actress in a Drama Special
**Hyun Bin** – **Secret Garden as Kim Joo-won**; **Kwon Sang-woo** – **Big Thing as Ha Do-ya**; Kim Nam-gil – Bad Guy as Shim Gun-wook	**Ha Ji-won** – **Secret Garden as Gil Ra-im**; Go Hyun-jung – Big Thing as Seo Hye-rim; Oh Yeon-soo – Bad Guy as Hong Tae-ra
Top Excellence Award, Actor in a Special Planning Drama	Top Excellence Award, Actress in a Special Planning Drama
**Lee Beom-soo** – **Giant as Lee Kang-mo**; Park Sang-min – Giant as Lee Sung-mo; Park Yong-woo – Jejungwon as Hwang Jung; Uhm Tae-woong – Dr. Champ as Lee Do-wook	**Kim Jung-eun** – **I Am Legend as Jeon Seol-hee**; Choi Jung-won – Wish Upon a Star as Jin Pal-gang; Han Hye-jin – Jejungwon as Yoo Seok-ran; Kim So-yeon – Dr. Champ as Kim Yeon-woo
Top Excellence Award, Actor in a Weekend/Daily Drama	Top Excellence Award, Actress in a Weekend/Daily Drama
**Son Hyun-joo** – **Definitely Neighbors as Kim Sung-jae**; Choi Bool-am – Your Paradise as Ki-soo; Jo Min-ki – Wife Returns as Yoon Sang-woo; Kim Yeong-cheol – Life Is Beautiful as Yang Byung-tae	**Yoo Ho-jeong** – **Definitely Neighbors as Yoon Ji-young**; Kim Yong-rim – Life Is Beautiful as Byung-tae's mother; Lee Mi-sook – Smile, Mom as Jo Bok-hee; Lee Yoo-ri – Daring Women as Ji Soon-young
Excellence Award, Actor in a Drama Special	Excellence Award, Actress in a Drama Special
**Lee Seung-gi** – **My Girlfriend Is a Nine-Tailed Fox as Cha Dae-woong**; Cha In-pyo – Big Thing as Kang Tae-san; Park Si-hoo – Prosecutor Princess as Seo In-woo	**Shin Min-ah** – **My Girlfriend Is a Nine-Tailed Fox as Gu Mi-ho**; Jang Seo-hee – Obstetrics and Gynecology Doctors as Seo Hye-young; Kim So-yeon – Prosecutor Princess as Ma Hye-ri
Excellence Award, Actor in a Special Planning Drama	Excellence Award, Actress in a Special Planning Drama
**Jeong Bo-seok** – **Giant as Jo Pil-yeon**; Jung Gyu-woon – Dr. Champ as Park Ji-heon; Kang Ji-hwan – Coffee House as Lee Jin-soo; Yeon Jung-hoon – Jejungwon as Baek Do-yang	**Park Jin-hee** – **Giant as Hwang Jung-yeon**; Chae Rim – Oh! My Lady as Yoon Gae-hwa; Moon Chae-won – It's Okay, Daddy's Girl as Eun Chae-ryung; Park Si-yeon – Coffee House as Seo Eun-young
Excellence Award, Actor in a Weekend/Daily Drama	Excellence Award, Actress in a Weekend/Daily Drama
**Song Chang-eui** – **Life Is Beautiful as Yang Tae-sub**; Jung Yoo-seok – The Miracle of Love as Seo Bong-dal; Lee Chang-hoon – Daring Women as Han Kyu-jin; Lee Jae-hwang – Smile, Mom as Shin Meo-roo	**Kang Sung-yeon** – **Wife Returns as Jung Yoo-hee**; Bae Jong-ok – Pure Pumpkin Flower as Joon-sun; Kim Ji-ho – You Don't Know Women as Lee Min-jung; Myung Se-bin – Three Sisters as Kim Eun-young
Best Supporting Actor in a Drama Special	Best Supporting Actress in a Drama Special
**Lee Jae-yong** – **Big Thing as Gong Sung-jo**; Kim Sang-ho – Prosecutor Princess; Park Geun-hyung – Big Thing; Sung Dong-il – My Girlfriend Is a Nine-Tailed Fox	**Lee Soo-kyung** – **Big Thing as Jang Se-jin**; Kim Sa-rang – Secret Garden as Yoon Seul; Kim Hye-ok – Bad Guy as Mrs. Shin; Yoon Yoo-sun – My Girlfriend Is a Nine-Tailed Fox as Cha Min-sook
Best Supporting Actor in a Special Planning Drama	Best Supporting Actress in a Special Planning Drama
**Lee Deok-hwa** – **Giant as Hwang Tae-seob**; Jung Woong-in – Coffee House as Han Ji-won; Kang Nam-gil – Jejungwon as Watanabe; Kim Seung-soo – I Am Legend as Cha Ji-wook	**Hong Ji-min** – **I Am Legend as Lee Hwa-ja**; Hwang Jung-eum – Giant as Lee Mi-joo; Jung Ae-ri – Wish Upon a Star as Lee Min-kyung; Kim Seo-hyung – Giant as Yoo Kyung-ok
Best Supporting Actor in a Weekend/Daily Drama	Best Supporting Actress in a Weekend/Daily Drama
**Shin Sung-rok** – **Definitely Neighbors as Jang Geun-hee**; Kim Il-woo – Pure Pumpkin Flower as Oh Geum-bok; Kim Mu-yeol – Wife Returns as Han Kang-soo; Yoon Da-hoon – Life Is Beautiful as Yang Byung-kil	**Im Ji-eun** – **Three Sisters as Kang Mi-ran**; Jo An – Three Sisters as Kim Eun-joo; Kim Mi-sook – Definitely Neighbors as Chae Young-shil; Nam Sang-mi – Life Is Beautiful as Boo Yeon-joo
Producer's Award	Achievement Award
**Cha In-pyo** – **Big Thing as Kang Tae-san**; **Park Sang-min** – **Giant as Lee Sung-mo**; **Han Hye-jin** – **Jejungwon as Yoo Seok-ran**	**Park Geun-hyung** – **Big Thing**
Netizen Popularity Award, Actor	Netizen Popularity Award, Actress
**Hyun Bin** – **Secret Garden as Kim Joo-won**; Jeong Bo-seok – Giant as Jo Pil-yeon; Kwon Sang-woo – Big Thing as Ha Do-ya; Lee Beom-soo – Giant as Lee Kang-mo; Lee Seung-gi – My Girlfriend Is a Nine-Tailed Fox as Cha Dae-woong	**Ha Ji-won** – **Secret Garden as Gil Ra-im**; Go Hyun-jung – Big Thing as Seo Hye-rim; Kim So-yeon – Prosecutor Princess as Ma Hye-ri; Park Jin-hee – Giant as Hwang Jung-yeon; Shin Min-ah – My Girlfriend Is a Nine-Tailed Fox as Gu Mi-ho
Best Couple Award	Most Popular Drama
**Hyun Bin** and **Ha Ji-won** – **Secret Garden**; **Joo Sang-wook** and **Hwang Jung-eum** – **Giant**; **Lee Seung-gi** and **Shin Min-ah** – **My Girlfriend Is a Nine-Tailed Fox**; Chang Mi-hee and Kim Sang-joong – Life Is Beautiful; Kim So-yeon and Park Shi-hoo – Prosecutor Princess; Kim Yeong-cheol and Kim Hae-sook – Life Is Beautiful; Kwon Sang-woo and Go Hyun-jung – Big Thing; Lee Beom-soo and Park Jin-hee – Giant; Shin Sung-rok and Yoo Ho-jeong – Definitely Neighbors; Song Chang-eui and Lee Sang-woo – Life Is Beautiful; Yoon Yoo-sun and Sung Dong-il – My Girlfriend Is a Nine-Tailed Fox	**Secret Garden**
Human Drama Award	Frontier Drama Award
**Definitely Neighbors**	**Dr. Champ**

=== Top 10 Stars ===
- Go Hyun-jung – Big Thing
- Ha Ji-won – Secret Garden
- Hyun Bin – Secret Garden
- Jeong Bo-seok – Giant
- Kim So-yeon – Prosecutor Princess, Dr. Champ
- Kwon Sang-woo – Big Thing
- Lee Beom-soo – Giant
- Lee Seung-gi – My Girlfriend Is a Nine-Tailed Fox
- Park Jin-hee – Giant
- Shin Min-ah – My Girlfriend Is a Nine-Tailed Fox

=== New Star Award ===
- Choi Siwon – Oh! My Lady
- Ham Eun-jung – Coffee House
- Han Chae-ah – Definitely Neighbors
- Hwang Jung-eum – Giant
- Joo Sang-wook – Giant
- Kim Soo-hyun – Giant
- Nam Gyu-ri – Life Is Beautiful
- No Min-woo – My Girlfriend Is a Nine-Tailed Fox
