= History of a Salaryman =

2012 South Korean television series

- Promotional poster
- Also known as: Salaryman Cho Han Ji
- Genre: Comedy; Thriller; Romance
- Written by: Jang Young-chul; Jung Kyung-soon
- Directed by: Yoo In-shik
- Starring: Lee Beom-soo; Jung Ryeo-won; Jung Gyu-woon; Hong Soo-hyun
- Composer: Kim Ji-soo
- Country of origin: South Korea
- Original language: Korean
- No. of episodes: 22

Production
- Executive producer: Choi Moon-seok
- Producers: Kim Yang; Lee Jin-suk
- Production company: JS Pictures

Original release
- Network: SBS TV
- Release: January 2 – March 13, 2012

History of a Salaryman (Korean: 샐러리맨 초한지; RR: Saelleorimaen chohanji) is a 2012 South Korean television series that aired on SBS from January 2 to March 31, 2012 on Mondays and Tuesdays at 21:55 for 22 episodes. Starring Lee Beom-soo, Jung Ryeo-won, Jung Gyu-woon, Hong Soo-hyun, Lee Deok-hwa, and Kim Seo-hyung, the series is a quirky comedy and murder mystery about an ordinary salaryman who finds himself involved with corporate spies and rival pharmaceutical companies. It satirizes the historical events during China's Chu–Han Contention (206–202 B.C.) using the background of modern office politics.

== Plot ==
Yoo-bang (Lee Beom-soo) sneaks into a villa at night and discovers the dead body of Chunha Medical Group executive Ho-hae (Park Sang-myun). His niece Yeo-chi (Jung Ryeo-won) is hiding in the room. At the funeral, both Yoo-bang and Yeo-chi get arrested for murder. How did things come to this? It all began three months ago when Chunha began trial testing for their new medicine. In exchange for a job recommendation from Ho-hae, Yoo-bang agrees to join the trial testing and steal information about the drug. Rival company director Hang-woo (Jung Gyu-woon) is also there undercover to find out about the new drug. Spoiled rich girl Yeo-chi is undergoing training because her grandfather wants her to inherit Chunha one day, though she herself is completely uninterested. For the trial testing, 30 testers, including Yoo-bang and Hang-woo, are shut off from the outside world for 10 days. During the trial period, strange things begin to happen...

== Cast ==
- Lee Beom-soo as Yoo-bang

Hero of the series who is a bright and optimistic man. He steals the heart of Yeo-chi. His historical analogue is Liu Bang, the first emperor of Han dynasty.

- Jung Ryeo-won as Baek Yeo-chi

A spoiled rich girl who was raised by her grandfather after her parents' death. Her historical analogue is Empress Lü Zhi.

- Jung Gyu-woon as Choi Hang-woo

A man who tries to get revenge against Chairman Jin for his father's suicide. His fiancée is Cha Woo Hee. His historical analogue is Xiang Yu, the self-styled "Hegemon King" of Western Chu.

- Hong Soo-hyun as Cha Woo-hee

A woman who is engaged to Hang-woo, and whom Yoo-bang is very close with. In an earlier draft of the script, Woo-hee dies after reuniting with Hang-woo, but the script was modified to give fans a happier ending. Her historical analogue is Consort Yu.

- Kim Seo-hyung as Mo Ga-bi

Antagonist of the series. She worked as the secretary for Jin Si-hwang, whom she later kills to become the company chairman herself. She manipulates people to do her bidding, among them her colleague Park Bum-jung, who sincerely loved her. In the end she goes insane after she is found guilty for conspiring to kill Jin and the attempted murder of Woo-hee. Her historical analogue is Zhao Gao, an official who served all 3 emperors of the Qin dynasty yet played an instrumental role in the dynasty's downfall.

- Lee Deok-hwa as Jin Si-hwang (Yeo-chi's grandfather). His historical analogue is Qin Shi Huang, the last emperor of Qin dynasty.
- Kim Il-woo as Jang Ryang. His historical analogue is Zhang Liang.
- Yoon Yong-hyun as Bun Kwae. His historical analogue is Fan Kuai.
- Lee Ki-young as Park Bum-jung. His historical analogue is Fan Zeng.
- Yoo Hyung-kwan as So Ha. His historical analogue is Xiao He.
- Yang Hyung-wook as Han Shin. His historical analogue is Han Xin.
- Kim Eung-soo as Oh Ji-rak
- Park Sang-myun as Jin Ho-hae. His historical analogue is Hu Hai.
- Jang Hyun-sung as Choi Hang-ryang. His historical analogue is Xiang Liang.
- Im Hyun-sik – Yoo-bang's father (Liu Bang's father Liu Taigong)
- Lee Joo-shil – Yoo-bang's mother (Liu Bang's mother Wang Hanshi)
- Kim Ji-young – Ji-won
- Lee Joon – Yeo-chi's boyfriend (cameo, ep 1)
- Jeong Bo-seok – Congressman Jo Pil-yeon (cameo, ep 6), the antagonist in the series Giant.
- Jeon Jae-hyung – Delivery man (cameo)
- Kang Kyung-joon – Bok Sa-yeol (cameo, ep 17)
- Kim Sung-oh – Prosecutor Park Moon-soo (cameo, ep 20)

== Soundtrack ==
1. 성냥팔이 소녀 (Little Match Girl) – Yoon Gun feat. Misty
2. 너 때문에 (For You) – JeA (Brown Eyed Girls)
3. Bravo – Lee Teuk (Super Junior), Key (SHINee)
4. 기대했단 말야 (Not What I Expected) – Joo
5. 샐러리맨 초한지 Title
6. 막무가내
7. Relax Your Mind
8. 긴 여정
9. Determination
10. 자중지란
11. 군웅할거
12. 방이 Theme
13. 천년지애
14. 낙장불입
15. 샐러리맨 초한지 Score Title
16. 도원결의
17. 비육지탄

== Episode ratings ==
Ep.	Original broadcast date	Average audience share			
Ep.	Original broadcast date	TNmS		AGB Nielsen	
Ep.	Original broadcast date	Nationwide	Seoul	Nationwide	Seoul
1	2 January 2012	8.1%	9.9%	8.7%	9.8%
2	3 January 2012	10.2%	11.9%	10.0%	12.3%
3	9 January 2012	11.3%	12.8%	10.5%	12.3%
4	10 January 2012	10.2%	12.1%	10.1%	11.4%
5	16 January 2012	13.5%	14.9%	12.1%	12.7%
6	17 January 2012	11.5%	12.2%	10.6%	11.6%
7	23 January 2012	9.2%	9.4%	9.9%	10.8%
8	24 January 2012	12.6%	14.5%	12.8%	13.5%
9	30 January 2012	14.5%	16.1%	13.7%	15.2%
10	31 January 2012	15.9%	17.3%	15.1%	15.8%
11	6 February 2012	17.1%	19.1%	14.6%	15.7%
12	7 February 2012	19.4%	21.5%	15.1%	15.0%
13	13 February 2012	20.1%	23.8%	15.9%	16.3%
14	14 February 2012	20.4%	22.9%	16.0%	16.2%
15	20 February 2012	21.6%	25.2%	16.9%	18.1%
16	21 February 2012	22.2%	24.3%	19.1%	19.6%
17	27 February 2012	21.0%	22.8%	18.8%	19.4%
18	28 February 2012	23.0%	25.2%	19.2%	19.7%
19	5 March 2012	22.7%	24.7%	18.7%	19.2%
20	6 March 2012	23.3%	24.5%	21.0%	21.9%
21	12 March 2012	22.1%	23.5%	19.1%	19.9%
22	13 March 2012	24.2%	24.7%	21.7%	22.4%
Average		17.0%	18.8%	14.9%	15.8%

Sources: TNmS Media Korea, AGB Nielsen Korea

== Awards and nominations ==
Year	Award	Category	Recipient	Result
2012	2012 SBS Drama Awards	Top 10 Stars	Jung Ryeo-won	Won
2012	2012 SBS Drama Awards	Top Excellence Award, Actress in a Miniseries	Jung Ryeo-won	Won
2012	2012 SBS Drama Awards	Special Award, Actor in a Miniseries	Lee Deok-hwa	Won
2012	2012 SBS Drama Awards	Top Excellence Award, Actor in a Miniseries	Lee Beom-soo	Nominated
2012	2012 SBS Drama Awards	Special Acting Award, Actress in a Miniseries	Kim Seo-hyung	Nominated
