= Triangle (2014 TV series) =

2014 South Korean television series

- Promotional poster
- Genre: Melodrama; Family; Romance; Action; Crime drama
- Written by: Choi Wan-kyu
- Directed by: Yoo Cheol-yong; Choi Jung-kyu
- Starring: Lee Beom-soo; Kim Jae-joong; Im Si-wan; Oh Yeon-soo; Baek Jin-hee
- Country of origin: South Korea
- Original language: Korean
- No. of episodes: 26

Production
- Executive producer: Joo Sung-woo
- Producer: Kim Ho-joon
- Running time: 60 minutes
- Production company: Taewon Entertainment

Original release
- Network: MBC TV
- Release: May 5 – July 29, 2014

Triangle (Korean: 트라이앵글) is a 2014 South Korean television series, starring Lee Beom-soo, Kim Jae-joong and Im Si-wan. It aired on MBC from May 5 to July 29, 2014 on Mondays and Tuesdays at 22:00 (KST) for 26 episodes. Triangle was directed by Yoo Cheol-yong and written by Choi Wan-kyu, who previously collaborated on the gambling dramas All In (2003) and Swallow the Sun (2009).

Separated in childhood by unfortunate circumstances, three brothers meet twenty years later, unaware of their connection to each other.

The drama achieved both domestic and international success, ranking among the most-watched dramas during its run in South Korea and its rights being sold internationally to multiple Asian countries.

== Synopsis ==
Jang Dong-soo, Jang Dong-chul and Jang Dong-woo are three brothers who got separated at a young age after their father died and their mother left them. They meet again twenty years later, but unaware of their blood ties, their ill-fated paths converge on casino territory where they find themselves at odds with each other.

Eldest brother Jang Dong-soo (Lee Beom-soo) followed in the footsteps of his father and became a detective. His greatest hope is to find his two brothers again and for the siblings to finally be reunited. Due to their different approaches to crime solving, Dong-soo clashes with Hwang Shin-hye (Oh Yeon-soo), a profiler who recently returned to Korea after studying overseas. They eventually gain a mutual respect for each other as colleagues, but find themselves in conflict once again when they learn that the gangster they're after is Dong-soo's own brother, Dong-chul.

Middle brother Jang Dong-chul (Kim Jae-joong) grew up as a petty thug on the streets, using his fists and wits to survive until he climbs to the top of a crime syndicate. Now a gang boss, he conceals his real identity and uses the name Heo Young-dal.

Youngest brother Jang Dong-woo (Im Si-wan) was adopted by a rich chaebol family, and now under the name Yoon Yang-ha, is being groomed as the heir to a casino empire. With no memory of his biological family and raised believing that the world revolves around money, Yang-ha is cynical and cold-hearted. Until he meets Oh Jung-hee (Baek Jin-hee), a poor girl supporting her family by working as a casino dealer, who changes the way Yang-ha sees the world. But he has a rival for her heart, Heo Young-dal. After losing a high-stakes game of Texas hold 'em to Young-dal, Yang-ha becomes furious and lands both Young-dal and Dong-soo in jail. Upon release, the two decide to embark on a mission to get revenge on everyone who has wronged them, including Dong-woo's father, Yoon Tae-joon, the CEO of Daejung Group and Go Bok-tae (Kim Byeong-ok), the gang boss who helped Yang-ha put Young-dal in jail.

== Cast ==
=== Main ===
- Lee Beom-soo as Jang Dong-soo
  - Noh Young-hak as young Dong-soo
- Kim Jae-joong as Jang Dong-chul / Heo Young-dal
- Im Si-wan as Jang Dong-woo / Yoon Yang-ha
- Oh Yeon-soo as Hwang Shin-hye
  - Kim So-hyun as young Shin-hye
- Baek Jin-hee as Oh Jung-hee

=== Supporting ===
- Park Ji-yeon as Sung Yoo-jin (ep. 15 onwards)
- Kang Shin-il as Hwang Jung-man
- Jang Dong-jik as Hyun Pil-sang
- Kim Byung-ki as Chairman Yoon Tae-joon
- Hong Seok-cheon as Man-kang
- Lee Yoon-mi as Madam Jang
- Shin Seung-hwan as Yang Jang-soo
- Shorry J as Jerry
- Im Ha-ryong as Yang Man-choon
- Kim Ji-young as Jung-hee's grandmother
- Kim Joo-yeob as Oh Byung-tae
- Park Min-soo as Oh Byung-soo
- Jung Ji-yoon as Kang Hyun-mi
- Jo Won-hee as Kang Chul-min
- Wi Yang-ho as Tak Jae-geol
- Park Hyo-joo as Kang Jin
- Son Ji-hoon as Detective Lee
- Im Ki-hyuk as Detective Min
- Kim Byeong-ok as Go Bok-tae
- Jo Sung-hyun as Kim Sang-moo
- Yeo Ho-min as Gong Soo-chang
- Jung Kyung-soon as Mrs. Paju
- Naya as Lee Soo-jung
- Baek Shin as Detective Gook
- Park Won-sook as Heo Choon-hee
- Choo Sung-hoon as gang enforcer (cameo)
- Choi Deok-moon as Jang Jeong-gook
- Cho Seung-hee as Herself

== Episodes ==
No.
1
Young-dal blackmails Mrs. Kim, the woman who's having an affair with him, into giving him large sums of money, which he and Jang-soo use to gamble at the casino. After losing the money, he retrieves more from Do Ki-chan's stash. Dong-soo is put under investigation after losing his patience in an interrogation and attempting to arrest Go Bok-tae, a gang boss who killed two of Dong-soo's colleagues. His mental condition is evaluated by Shin-hye, who determines that he has Intermittent Explosive Disorder and recommends therapy. Dong-soo discovers that Go Bok-tae is most likely getting funds illegally from his dealings in the casino business. Meanwhile, Young-dal barely escapes from Mr. Kim after his affair is discovered.
2
Dong-soo tries to recruit Young-dal as a snitch to get more information about Go Bok-tae's casino fund laundering, but Young-dal refuses to work as one. Jung-hee cannot pay back her debts and almost has to give up the family home but is saved by Madame Jang, who pays her debts. In return, Jung-hee must work as a dealer in Madame Jang's illegal casino. Young-dal cannot control his desire to gamble and agrees to become Dong-soo's snitch, provided that he can get him into the casino he's been banned from because of disorderly conduct. Shin-hye and her husband Hyun Pil-sang discuss possible divorce because of their two-year-long separation. Pil-sang also joins with Go Bok-tae in plans to make money off of Daejung casino's plan for a new resort. Do Ki-chan is found dead, apparently having committed suicide, but Shin-hye is suspicious and asks Dong-soo to investigate. Young-dal loses a game of Texas Hold 'em dealt by Jung-hee to Yang-ha, who then asks Jung-hee to drink with him. She refuses. Young-dal is informed of Do Ki-chan's death and steals the rest of his money.
3
Dong-soo continues to investigate Do Ki-chan's death and accepts Shin-hye's offer of psychological treatment for his anger management problems. He recounts the story of his childhood (including the death of his father, Jang Jong-kuk) to her in hopes of releasing his emotions. Yang-ha blackmails Jung-hee into drinking with him. Young-dal begins living in the side of Jung-hee's house after paying a year's rent in advance. The police finds the illegal casino while Jung-hee is working and Young-dal is gambling, so he makes her run home with him.
4
Young-dal and Jung-hee are surrounded by hit men sent to kill Young-dal. Young-dal is stabbed and calls Dong-soo for help. After Young-dal does not return home, Jung-hee, Jang-soo, and Jerry also begin searching for him. Jang-soo and Jerry bribe a doctor into treating Young-dal for his stab wound without informing the hospital. Young-dal is attacked again and taken to the Yakuza, who were hired to retrieve Do Ki-chan's money. Dang-soo and the police unit, tipped off by Jang-soo and Jerry, save Young-dal as he is being tortured. Dong-soo interrogates Young-dal about the whereabouts of Do Ki-chan's money, but Young-dal manages to lie even after being threatened with a gun. He also manages to throw off Shin-hye and tells her that he grew up as a beggar and does not recall how or why he came to Sabuk. Jung-hee gets a job as a real dealer at Daejung casino, and Young-dal drives her to work on her first day. On the return trip he is assaulted by Go Bok-tae's men, who have already tortured Jang-soo and Jerry for information on Do Ki-chan's money.
5
Go Bok-tae finds and seizes the money Young-dal took from Do Ki-chan. He is impressed with how Young-dal held up under both his and Dang-soo's interrogation and tells his men to keep an eye on him. He also instructs Mrs. Min to support him. Young-dal decides to form a gang and eventually work for Go Bok-tae, either loyally or as Dong-soo's snitch. Jung-hee begins her training as a real casino dealer, only to be constantly hounded by Yang-ha, who is in training with her. She is also harassed by Madame Jang, who forces her to continue working at the illegal casino. Dong-soo obtains a warrant for search and seizure in the office of Chung-jin developments (Go Bok-tae's company). He prepares to start an investigation on his money laundering, but Pil-sang uses his connections to try to dissuade him. Yang-ha anonymously pays off Jung-hee's debt. Go Bok-tae tells Young-dal that in order to gain his trust he must kill Dong-soo.
6
Dong-soo takes Young-dal out to eat. Jung-hee struggles to find a way to pay off her debts and is later informed that they have been paid. She quickly realizes Yang-ha did it and confronts him. She also realizes that he is the Chairman's son. Young-dal begins training his gang, having decided to take over the illegal casino. Go Bok-tae continues to pressure Young-dal into stabbing Dong-soo.
7
Yang-ha overhears Go Bok-tae and Chairman Tae-joon and realizes how Jang Jong-guk really died. He confronts his father, who then appoints him as the Director of Operations. Young-dal unsuccessfully tries to get Dong-soo killed and then confesses, but Dong-soo says he'll take care of the situation. Shin-hye decides to go through with divorcing Pil-sang. Yang-ha becomes jealous of Young-dal and Jung-hee's friendship and arranges to play Hold' em with him at the illegal casino, with Jung-hee as the dealer. Young-dal bets very high stakes, hoping to ignite Yang-ha's pride.
8
Yang-ha expects to win and also plays a high-stakes game, but luck favors Young-dal instead. A former coworker of Jang Jong-guk tells Dong-soo that Go Bok-tae was hired to kill his father. Young-dal successfully takes over the private casino.
9
Yoon Tae-joon is frustrated about Go Bok-tae's pursuit of a share in his casino business and hires Dong-soo to help get rid of him. Go Bok-tae's men kidnap Dong-soo, but Shin-hye alerts the investigative unit. Go Bok-tae is impressed with Young-dal's takeover of the private casino and tells him to cheat at Daejung casino to get back at Yoon Tae-joon.
10
Young-dal is about to cheat at Daejung casino, but Yang-ha finds out about the plan and Dong-soo barely manages to tip Young-dal off in time. However, instead of giving up, Young-dal continues to play. Yang-ha finds out who Dong-soo's father is and Dong-soo manages to find out who his birth mother is. Yang-ha persuades Go Bok-tae to put Young-dal in jail in exchange for shares in the casino.
11
Young-dal gets into trouble at prison with the man who actually owned Do Ki-chan's money. He also ends up saving an inmate's life. Shin-hye and Dong-soo begin investigating Yoon Tae-joon. Yang-ha pretends to drive Jung-hee to a dealer training workshop but drives her elsewhere instead.
12
Yang-ha tries to change Jung-hee's mind about him. Dong-soo moves recklessly in getting revenge for his father and Yang-ha puts him in jail with Young-dal as well. A year later, they are released and make plans for revenge. Mrs. Min backs them because she has been stabbed in the back by Go Bok-tae, as she predicted. Yoon Tae-joon tries to sell shares for Daejung casino to an American company in order to raise funds for the resort, but Young-dal and Dong-soo convince VIP customers to agree to file a joint class-action lawsuit, causing prices to plummet. Desperate for money, Yoon Tae-joon reaches out to Ahn Chang-bong for a loan, not knowing that he is under Young-dal's control because he is indebted to him for saving his life in prison.
13
Young-dal instructs Ahn Chang-bong to lend Daejung casino the money on one condition: that he put one of his people in the management. Yang-ha agrees and Young-dal prepares to send Dong-soo to work at Daejung casino. Young-dal seeks help from Shin-hye in recovering his suppressed childhood memories. Dong-soo blackmails an investor into backing out of the resort deal, and because of the resulting fallout, Go Bok-tae is ordered to take care of Dong-soo.
14
Yoon Tae-joon begins to pressure Yang-ha into getting married, unaware of his current situation with Jung-hee. The man Young-dal owed money to back in jail, Man-bok, is released and threatens Young-dal until he uses his connections with Mrs. Min to cut a deal. Jung-hee considers leaving Daejung casino and working at a casino in Seoul to escape Yang-ha's relentless pursuit of her. Shin-hye is able to make Young-dal recall his real name and that of his younger brother, but he cannot remember his older brother's name. As he doesn't know his last name, Shin-hye does more work to confirm that he is in fact Dong-soo's little brother, but before the brothers can have a reunion, Dong-soo is mortally wounded by one of Go Bok-tae's hit men.
15
Dong-soo has fallen in a coma due to loss of blood. Pil-sang tells Chairman Yoon Tae-joon about Yang-ha's feelings for Jung-hee. Seoul's investigative unit uses CCTV footage to identify the hit man and find a connection to Go Bok-tae. Shin-hye arrests him and he tries to blackmail Chairman Yoon to get him out of jail. Yang-ha has a confrontation with his father about his future and marriage. With no other choice as Dong-soo has not recovered, Young-dal sends himself in as Ahn Chang-bong's representative at Daejung Casino.
16
Young-dal's position at Daejung Casino causes quite an uproar. Dong-soo is in critical condition so Young-dal visits their mother in his place. Go Bok-tae captures President Min to get information about Young-dal. Yang-ha is further frustrated by Young-dal's performance at a business meeting, and Dong-soo finally realizes who Young-dal is.
17
Yang-ha is distressed that Young-dal outdid him at the meeting and his panic disorder acts up as he becomes paranoid of Yoon Tae-joon's shifting favoritism. Go Bok-tae is agitated because Dong-soo is alive. Young-dal works on his plans for raising business at the casino, which proves to be difficult because there's a traitor in his inner circle.
18
Go Bok-tae hires a gangster who uses unconventional methods in order to trump Young-dal. Yang-ha interferes in Young-dal's business deals and Young-dal is occupied with a hostage situation that ends up ruining his personal life.
19
Shin-hye solves the mystery of Dong-woo's identity, but she needs more evidence, so the entire team starts searching. Through her investigation she obtains a photo of a young Dong-chul and Jung-hee together. Jung-hee's nostalgic grandmother gives Jung-hee a similar photo after her interview with Shin-hye, but both of them are unaware of Dong-chul's real identity. Jun-ho uncovers the traitor on Young-dal's team, but Young-dal decides to use him for his plans instead of revealing his knowledge. Young-dal has an idea to get rid of the gangster Go Bok-tae hired and in the meantime ruins Yang-ha's business plan.
20
Chairman Tae-joon threatens Yang-ha using Jung-hee, forcing Young-dal to intervene. Young-dal's plan gets complicated as his fate is now thrown into the balance. Dong-soo struggles with the truth of Dong-woo's identity.
21
Young-dal and Dong-soo try to figure out what to do about their plans now that they know Dong-woo's identity. Yang-ha resolves to work his way back up in the company but this puts him up against his brothers. Pil-sang is determined to replace Yang-ha and attempts to make a deal with Dong-soo. In the illegal casino, President Min crashes into someone who could be of some help in the situation, but Chairman Tae-joon makes Yang-ha take the fall in his place. Desperate for a reconciliation, Young-dal tells Yang-ha who he really is.
22
Yang-ha struggles with his identity and does not know what to do. Young-dal is distressed about Yang-ha's inevitable arrest and reveals Yang-ha's past to Jung-hee. Chairman Tae-joon assigns the job of getting rid of Young-dal to Pil-sang, who targets him indirectly. Meanwhile, Young-dal's position is jeopardized by an orchestrated attack on Ahn Chang-bong.
23
Young-dal flies into a rage because of Ahn Chang Bong's condition, while Yang-ha tries to carry out his CEO and personal duties. Jung-hee cracks the mystery behind the photo she got from her grandmother. Shin-hye is called to meet with Chairman Tae-joon and she humiliates him. Ahn Chang Bong wisely secures Young-dal's position using his will. Go Bok Tae decides to get back at Young-dal by turning the police on all his allies. Young-dal loses his temper after discovering who was behind the attack on Ahn Chang Bong and then is almost killed by an attack targeting him and Jung-hee.
24
Pil-sang is arrested after the investigative unit finds evidence connecting him to the attack on Ahn Chang-bong, but he resists cracking under interrogation. Yang-ha is shaken by a death in the family, lowering his favor with Chairman Tae-joon and making him vulnerable to Pil-sang. Shin-hye plans to leave for the United States to work with the FBI.
25
Young-dal instructs Mrs. Min to continue with the plan and render Go Bok-tae bankrupt. Yang-ha is still reeling from current events and drunkenly asks to gamble with Young-dal. Young-dal's team has a celebration dinner for his recent success over Go Bok-tae, but the festivities are cut short with some awful news.
26
Dong-soo and Young-dal attempt to carry out Yang-ha's wishes for a reconciliation, but Chairman Tae-joon is as cold-hearted and unrepentant as ever. Their grief is slightly alleviated by the capture of Go Bok-tae. The show ends with not one, but two shocking deaths.

== Reception ==
Triangle was well-received by the audience ranking among the most-watched dramas on terrestrial networks during its two-month run. It peaked at a 10.3% nationwide ratings on its final episode.

The drama was also pre-sold in Japan, China, and Thailand for a US$7 Million contract. It will be aired in the said countries in their native language.

In China, Triangle has exceeded 100 million views on Tencent; China's largest online video site, for its first 5 episodes alone, becoming one of the most-watched South Korean dramas in the country. Lead actor Kim Jae-joong's fan club in China has been broadcasting a total of 144 promotional screens at popular subway stations in Seoul since the 10th. It will be exposed for one month.

"Even If You Hate", an original soundtrack for the series, co-written and sang by Kim Jae-joong, took 2nd place on the Japanese iTunes OST chart and 4th place on the overall single chart upon release. Due to the success of the soundtrack, the singer also ranked #1 on Twitter's Hot Word and Celebrity charts while also trending on the platform.

== Ratings ==
Ep.	Original broadcast date	Average audience share			
Ep.	Original broadcast date	Nielsen Korea		TNmS	
Ep.	Original broadcast date	Nationwide	Seoul	Nationwide	Seoul
1	May 5, 2014	8.9% (13th)	9.7% (9th)	9.0% (15th)	10.3% (11th)
2	May 6, 2014	9.6% (11th)	11.1% (8th)	8.6% (16th)	10.2% (12th)
3	May 12, 2014	7.5% (NR)	8.1% (19th)	7.1% (NR)	8.9% (16th)
4	May 13, 2014	7.4% (18th)	7.9% (16th)	7.4% (20th)	8.9% (16th)
5	May 19, 2014	7.3% (NR)	8.2% (NR)	7.0% (NR)	8.2% (20th)
6	May 20, 2014	6.8% (NR)	7.1% (20th)	7.5% (20th)	8.8% (16th)
7	May 26, 2014	6.7% (NR)	6.9% (NR)	6.9% (NR)	8.5% (16th)
8	May 27, 2014	6.3% (NR)	5.8% (NR)	7.7% (17th)	9.5% (12th)
9	June 2, 2014	6.4% (NR)	7.3% (NR)	6.6% (NR)	8.2% (19th)
10	June 3, 2014	6.7% (NR)	7.0% (NR)	7.3% (20th)	8.7% (15th)
11	June 9, 2014	6.2% (NR)	6.7% (NR)	7.0% (NR)	8.5% (16th)
12	June 10, 2014	6.2% (NR)	6.9% (17th)	6.9% (20th)	8.8% (15th)
13	June 16, 2014	5.7% (NR)	6.2% (NR)	7.1% (NR)	8.9% (16th)
14	June 17, 2014	7.7% (16th)	8.2% (15th)	7.7% (18th)	9.4% (12th)
15	June 23, 2014	7.5% (20th)	7.7% (19th)	8.0% (20th)	10.4% (10th)
16	June 24, 2014	8.6% (15th)	9.2% (14th)	9.2% (13th)	11.8% (9th)
17	June 30, 2014	7.4% (19th)	8.0% (14th)	8.2% (17th)	10.5% (11th)
18	July 1, 2014	8.9% (12th)	10.0% (11th)	8.4% (15th)	10.2% (11th)
19	July 7, 2014	9.0% (14th)	10.0% (11th)	8.3% (18th)	11.1% (11th)
20	July 8, 2014	9.5% (14th)	10.3% (10th)	8.6% (15th)	11.8% (8th)
21	July 14, 2014	9.1% (13th)	10.4% (12th)	7.9% (10th)	10.9% (12th)
22	July 15, 2014	10.0% (13th)	11.2% (9th)	9.5% (12th)	12.7% (6th)
23	July 21, 2014	9.5% (11th)	9.9% (10th)	8.8% (14th)	11.2% (8th)
24	July 22, 2014	10.0% (9th)	11.6% (8th)	9.1% (12th)	11.5% (6th)
25	July 28, 2014	9.2% (12th)	10.5% (6th)	8.8% (13th)	11.6% (6th)
26	July 29, 2014	10.5% (8th)	12.2% (5th)	10.3% (11th)	13.2% (5th)
Average		8.0%	8.8%	8.0%	10.1%
In the table above, the blue numbers represent the lowest ratings and the red numbers represent the highest ratings.; NR denotes that the drama did not rank in the top 20 daily programs on that date.

== Awards and nominations ==
Year	Award	Category	Recipient	Result	Ref.
2014	7th Korea Drama Awards	Top Excellence Award - actor	Kim Jae-joong	Won	
2014	7th Korea Drama Awards	TV OST Award	"Day By Day"	Won	
2014	16th Seoul International Youth Film Festival	Best Young Actress	Park Ji-yeon	Nominated	
2014	MBC Drama Awards	Top Excellence Award, Actor in a Special Project Drama	Lee Beom-soo	Nominated	
2014	MBC Drama Awards	Excellence Award, Actor in a Special Project Drama	Kim Jae-joong	Nominated	
2014	MBC Drama Awards	Excellence Award, Actress in a Special Project Drama	Baek Jin-hee	Won	
2014	MBC Drama Awards	Best New Actor	Im Si-wan	Won	
2014	DramaBeans Awards	Best Melodrama	Triangle	Nominated	
2014	DramaBeans Awards	Most Dysfunctional Relationship	Triangle	Nominated	
2014	DramaBeans Awards	Breakout Performance	Kim Jae-joong	Nominated	
2014	KU Awards	Drama of The Year	Triangle	Won	
2014	KU Awards	Most Hateful Character	Park Ji-yeon	Nominated	
2014	KU Awards	Best Kiss	Park Ji-yeon & Im Si-wan	Won	
2014	Soompi Drama Awards	Best Idol Actor / Actress of the Year	Im Si-wan	Nominated	
2014	Soompi Drama Awards	Breakout Actor / Actress of The Year	Baek Jin-hee	Nominated	
2014	Soompi Drama Awards	Best Villain	Baek Jin-hee	Nominated	

== International broadcast ==
Premiere	Network	Region	Title	Note
October 4, 2014	PPTV	Thailand	Triangle	
November 2, 2014	DATV	Japan	トライアングル	with Japanese subtitles
December 18, 2014	Oh!K	Malaysia	Triangle	
December 18, 2014	Oh!K	Singapore	Triangle	
May 21, 2015	CS TV	Japan	トライアングル	
June 14, 2015	TVB	Hong Kong	Triangle	
