= Bitter Sweet Life =

- Promotional poster
- Also known as: La Dolce Vita
- Genre: Romance; Drama; Mystery
- Written by: Jung Ha-yeon
- Directed by: Kim Jin-min
- Starring: Oh Yeon-soo; Lee Dong-wook; Jung Bo-seok; Park Si-yeon
- Music by: Hwang Sang-jun; Roh Hyeong-woo; Lyoo Hyung Wook
- Country of origin: South Korea
- Original language: Korean
- No. of episodes: 24

Production
- Executive producer: Choi Yi-sup
- Production locations: South Korea; Japan

Original release
- Network: MBC TV
- Release: May 3 – July 20, 2008

Bitter Sweet Life (Korean: 달콤한 인생; RR: Dalkomhan insaeng; lit. The Sweet Life) is a 2008 South Korean television series that aired on MBC TV. A dark melodrama with a fragmented narrative and voice-overs highlighting the characters' state of mind, it was hailed as a daring portrayal of middle-aged romance and adultery with elements of mystery and noir.

The drama reunites Lee Dong-wook and Park Si-yeon after working together in the 2005 hit drama My Girl.

== Plot ==
When a man plunges to his death from a high-rise luxury apartment complex, retired detective Park Byung-shik is called in to investigate. He soon discovers that the man is a fugitive he'd pursued for years before leaving the force. As he begins to investigate what led up to this night, we flashback six months to where it all began... Yoon Hye-jin and Ha Dong-won are unhappily married. When Hye-jin discovers that her husband is having an affair, she flees to Japan, planning to kill herself in Otaru, Hokkaido. While there, she soon attracts the attention of handsome, mysterious Lee Joon-soo. Returning to Korea, Hye-jin expects never to see Joon-soo again, but what she doesn't realize is her husband's mistress Hong Da-ae is Joon-soo's ex, and soon the fates of the four individuals are hopelessly entangled...

== Cast ==
=== Main ===
- Yoon Hye-jin (Oh Yeon-soo)

Age: 38. Forgoing a career as an interpreter, she chose to become a full-time homemaker when she married Dong-won. Although she gave up her career dreams, she made the decision based on what she thought was best for her children and husband. She believes that her choice equates to happiness. So her husband is always the decision maker at home. And so the life of one woman came to a standstill career-wise. But when she begins to become suspicious of her husband, her life moves into a different direction.

- Lee Joon-soo (Lee Dong-wook)

Age: 28. In the beginning, he was introduced in business circles as a friend of Sung-gu. But when Sung-gu withdrew from social circles, Joon-soo inherited the fame that Sung-gu once had. People knew him as Joon-soo from then on. But Joon-soo and Sung-gu were very tight friends. Sung-gu had everything that Joon-soo could never possibly have. But things were changing as Joon-soo started dating Da-ae. Sung-gu wanted to check out Joon-soo's girlfriend. In fact, he wanted to steal her from him. Joon-soo knew what was going on. But Da-ae resisted the idea.

- Ha Dong-won (Jung Bo-seok)

Age: 40. A fund manager who oversees a mid-cap fund and is rated as one of the top ten fund managers in Asia. He's a handsome man and is also said to be one of the best-dressed people at work. He has a lovely wife and two children. With a picture-perfect family, he has a narcissist bent. But it is different with Hong Da-ae. If he could, he would have given her everything he had to win her heart but it was not easy. Even though he was carrying on a long-term affair with her, she never wanted to become his wife or mistress. And Dong-won believed that was why they were able to have such a long relationship. That is until Da-ae told him she wanted to stop seeing him.

- Hong Da-ae (Park Si-yeon)

Age: 27. Scarlett, a jewelry shop in Apgujeong, is famous for two reasons. One reason was that top celebrities frequented the jewelry store and the other, Da-ae the owner of the jewelry store was strikingly beautiful. Da-ae has pretty looks that fit in with the times. But when she began seeing Dong-won in an indecent arrangement, her dreams were dashed away and replaced with a different desire. Then one day, Joon-soo entered her life. When she met Joon-soo, Da-ae found the man that made her realize that she could no longer continue her relationship with Dong-woon.

=== Supporting ===
- Jung Gyu-woon as Kang Sung-gu
- Baek Il-seob as Park Byung-sik
- Jo Kyung-hwan as President Kang, Sung-gu's father
- Yoon Hyun-sook as Myung-ja, Da-ae's friend
- Moon Ga-young as Ha Na-ri
- Kim Ji-min as Ha Na-rae
- Jang Young-nam as Sung-sook, Hye-jin's friend
- Seo Dong-won as Hyun-pil
- Kim Il-woo as Shin Jung-ho
- Kim Mi-kyung as Mrs. Ri
- Lee Doo-il as Woo-suk, Hye-jin's colleague
- Kim Sung-joon as Detective Lee
- Ryu Ui-hyun

== Ratings ==
| Date | Episode | Nationwide | Seoul |
|---|---|---|---|
| 2008-05-03 | 1 | 7.9% (16th) | 8.1% (17th) |
| 2008-05-04 | 2 | 6.2% | 8.8% |
| 2008-05-10 | 3 | 6.9% | 7.2% |
| 2008-05-11 | 4 | 5.8% | 8.0% |
| 2008-05-17 | 5 | 7.4% | 7.9% (18th) |
| 2008-05-18 | 6 | 6.9% | 9.4% |
| 2008-05-24 | 7 | 6.9% | 7.4% |
| 2008-05-25 | 8 | 6.8% | 8.9% |
| 2008-05-31 | 9 | 8.5% (11th) | 9.1% (9th) |
| 2008-06-01 | 10 | 9.3% (19th) | 10.0% (16th) |
| 2008-06-07 | 11 | 7.9% (18th) | 8.2% (16th) |
| 2008-06-08 | 12 | 9.6% (19th) | 10.0% (17th) |
| 2008-06-14 | 13 | 8.1% (17th) | 8.5% (16th) |
| 2008-06-15 | 14 | 9.2% (20th) | 9.9% (15th) |
| 2008-06-21 | 15 | 8.4% (14th) | 8.7% (11th) |
| 2008-06-22 | 16 | 11.3% (10th) | 11.6% (10th) |
| 2008-06-28 | 17 | 8.4% (15th) | 8.4% (15th) |
| 2008-06-29 | 18 | 8.7% | 9.5% |
| 2008-07-05 | 19 | 7.5% | 7.9% (20th) |
| 2008-07-06 | 20 | 8.5% | 9.5% |
| 2008-07-12 | 21 | 7.6% (20th) | 7.9% |
| 2008-07-13 | 22 | 8.1% | 9.3% (19th) |
| 2008-07-19 | 23 | 6.3% | 8.9% |
| 2008-07-20 | 24 | 9.7% | 11.3% |
| Average | | 8.0% | – |

Source: TNS Media Korea

== International broadcast ==
It aired in Japan on cable channel KNTV from May 3 to July 20, 2008, then on another cable channel BS-Japan.
