= Monster (South Korean TV series) =

2016 South Korean TV series

- Promotional poster
- Genre: Revenge; Romance; Thriller
- Written by: Jang Young-chul; Jung Kyung-soon
- Directed by: Joo Sung-woo
- Starring: Kang Ji-hwan; Sung Yu-ri; Park Ki-woong; Claudia Kim
- Country of origin: South Korea
- Original language: Korean
- No. of episodes: 50

Production
- Executive producer: Lee Chang-seob
- Producer: Son Young-joon
- Production locations: South Korea; Hainan, China
- Running time: 60 minutes
- Production company: Victory Contents

Original release
- Network: Munhwa Broadcasting Corporation
- Release: March 28 – September 20, 2016

Monster (Korean: 몬스터) is a 2016 South Korean television series starring Kang Ji-hwan, Sung Yu-ri, Park Ki-woong and Claudia Kim. It replaced Glamorous Temptation and airs on MBC on Mondays and Tuesdays at 09:55 pm (KST) from March 28 to September 20, 2016, for 50 episodes.

== Plot ==
In his youth, Lee Guk-cheol lost his wealthy family as well as his sights due to the orchestrated car accident and his inheritance to his greedy uncle, Byun Il-jae who plans to steal the inheritance to invest in his scheme to buy out Dodo Group, a powerful conglomerate. Despite his blindness, Guk-cheol gains superhuman hearing. Guk-cheol's aunt Moon attempts to expose her husband in revenge for his infidelity was killed by Il-jae's mistress who is also her best friend. He lost everything and descended to the lowest echelons of society, from spoiled rich heir to lowly beggar almost overnight. However, with the help of Yoo Seong-aean, an NIS agent who investigate the Dodo Group, opportunity arises whereby he is able to obtain a new identity - Kang Gi-tan, allowing him to take back what is rightfully his and enact vengeance on those responsible for ruining his life. However, in his quest for revenge, he meets opposition in the form of Do Gun-woo, the illegitimate son of a chaebol chairman, and Oh Soo-yeon, a young woman who seem suspiciously similar to someone he developed feelings for in his youth.

It is revealed that Bryun Il-jae works as executive for the Dodo Group and secretly manipulate the stock market of the company so he can buy out the company at cheap price. Do Gun-woo is used as a mean for Il-jae to take down Do Choong, the chairman of Dodo group from within.

As Guk-cheol climbing the corporate ladder, he teams up with Do Choong to take down Il-jae by exposing his entire scheme to the Chairman. Do Choong wants to learn about Ki-tan's motive in bringing down Il-Jae but he Ki-tan declines. Do Choong suggests a simple solution is to simply fire Il-jae but Ki-tan states that it will not work since Il-jae can still find a way to take over his company.

== Cast ==
=== Main cast ===
- Kang Ji-hwan as Kang Ki-tan / Lee Guk-cheol
  - Lee Gi-kwang as young Lee Guk-cheol

Born Lee Guk-cheol, he was the heir to Sudo Hospital, until the deaths of his parents and aunt. He survived several murder attempts against him, but lost everything and became a beggar. Blinded by the car accident that killed his parents, Guk-cheol's sense of hearing is heightened to superhuman levels, an ability he would continue to possess as an adult. Years later, he undergoes surgery to cure his blindness and change his appearance. He obtains a new identity - Kang Ki-tan, using it to exact revenge on those responsible for his predicament. Later in the series, he is adopted by Jo Ki-ryang, the leader of Huaping after he takes a bullet for him. With the latter's financial backing, Ki-tan starts his own company, KT Corporation, with plans to take over Dodo Group and complete his revenge.

- Sung Yu-ri as Oh Soo-yeon / Cha Jeong-eun
  - Lee Yul-eum as young Cha Jeong-eun

As a teenager, Cha Jeong-eun met Guk-cheol when she worked as his maid. Guk-cheol begin to develop feelings for her but circumstances separated the two. Many years later, she now goes by the name Oh Soo-yeon. She meets Kang Ki-tan, but both are unaware of their shared past together due to both of them having adopted new identities. She is somewhat materialistic, stemming from her struggles to make ends meet to pay for her autistic younger brother's medical fees. Later in the series, she starts up a law firm with Min Byung-ho.

- Park Ki-woong as Do Gun-woo

He is the illegitimate son of Dodo Group's chairman. Gun-woo lived in America for most of his youth, having murdered his abusive stepfather and witnessed his mother commit suicide. Byun Il-jae brings him back to Korea with the intention of using him as a tool to topple Dodo Group's chairman and take the company for himself. As one of Dodo Group's new recruits, Gun-woo develops a mutual rivalry with Kang Ki-tan. After Do Choong finds out that Gun-woo is his illegitimate son, he takes Gun-woo under his wing and promotes him to Vice Chairman of Dodo Group.

- Claudia Kim as Yoo Seong-ae

A NIS agent who has been tasked with infiltrating Dodo Group.

=== Dodo Group ===
Dodo Group is a large and powerful chaebol in Korea. The chairman is Do Choong. The main cast have found employment within Dodo Group, each with their own motivations and objectives.

- Park Yeong-gyu as Do Choong

The chairman of Dodo Group. He is the father of Gwang-woo and Shin-young. He also has an illegitimate son - Gun-woo.

- Jeong Bo-seok as Byun Il-jae

The main antagonist of the series. Il-jae was Guk-cheol's uncle who murdered his parents and stole his inheritance so he can invest in his scheme to buy out Dodo Group. He was once a prosecutor but now works on the legal team of Dodo Group. He is a greedy and power-hungry man who schemes to take control of Dodo Group and eventually rise to a position of eminence. He is eventually convicted of all his crimes and sentenced to death.

- Park Hoon as Oh Choong-dong

Byun Il-jae's unquestionably loyal manservant, who usually helps to carry out Il-jae's dirty work.

- Lee Deok-hwa as Hwang Jae-man

A corrupt politician who sells knock-off military equipment to South Korean Army. He is Do Choong's brother-in-law and Il-jae's father-in-law. He harbors resentment towards Do Choong.

- Kim Bo-yeon as Hwang Gwi-ja

Do Choong's wife and Jae-man's sister. She has a strong animosity towards Gun-woo, being responsible for banishing his mother, who was Do Choong's mistress. Gwi-ja becomes increasingly angry when Do Choong allows Gun-woo's rise to power in Dodo Group after Gwang-woo's imprisonment.

- Jin Tae-hyun as Do Gwang-woo

The CEO of Dodo Group and Do Choong's eldest son. Gwang-woo is an extremely greedy and unscrupulous man, having blackmailed Il-jae into murdering Guk-cheol's parents. Gwang-woo was later found guilty of creating a slush fund and for allowing T9, a carcinogenic coating agent in Dodo Group's products. He is sent to prison, although he is later pardoned and released.

- Jo Bo-ah as Do Shin-young

Do Choong's youngest daughter. She is a typical bratty and spoiled rich girl. She has a habit of calling Ki-tan 'Kang Ga-din', whom she develops a crush on.

- Kim Hye-eun as Hwang Ji-soo

Jae-man's daughter. Like her father, she also entered politics. Il-jae had an affair with her. She accidentally killed Man-ok, Il-jae's first wife and her friend when the affair was discovered. Il-jae helped her cover up the crime and made her his second wife.

- Jung Woong-in as Moon Tae-gwang

The chief secretary of the SPD division in Dodo Group. He dislikes Byun Il-jae, and the feeling is mutual. A hardworking employee who dedicated his life to Dodo Group, he is fired by Gwang-woo for hurting the latter's pride. After struggling with poverty for a year, Ki-tan recruits him to join his company, KT Corporation, which Tae-gwang accepts. He becomes Ki-tan's right-hand man, swearing complete allegiance to Ki-tan in return for helping him clear his debts.

- Kim Se-ah as Mo Kyung-shin

Tae-gwang's assistant.

- Cha Kwang-soo as Go Hae-sool

Dodo Group executive.

- Lee Seung-hyung as Han Sang-goo

The Do family's secretary.

- Song Kyung-chul as Gong Bok-shin

The Do family's butler who is very loyal to Do Choong. He was once the head of the SPD at Dodo Group and Moon Tae-gwang's superior.

- Kim Dong-hee as Lee Soo-tak

A nerdy Dodo Group employee who entered the company at the same time as the main characters. He has a crush on Yoo Seong-ae. He loses his job and goes to prison due to the machinations of Byun Il-jae and Do Gun-woo. A year later, Ki-tan recruits him and Moon Tae-gwang to join his company, KT Corporation.

- Lee Mun-jeong as Hong Nan-jeong

One of the new Dodo Group employees who entered the company at the same time as the main characters. She is close friends with Soo-yeon. She later quits Dodo Group to work at the law firm founded by Oh Soo-yeon and Min Byung-ho.

- Jin Ye-sol as Park So-hee

One of the new Dodo Group employees who entered the company at the same time as the main characters. She looks down and dislikes Soo-yeon.

- Shin Joo-hwan as Kim Hae-il

One of the new Dodo Group employees who entered the company at the same time as the main characters. He later becomes Gun-woo's personal assistant when the latter is promoted to Vice Chairman of Dodo Group.

=== Huaping ===
An underground firearms dealer associated with the Chinese mafia.

- Choi Jong-won as Jo Ki-ryang

The boss of Huaping, whose identity was a mystery at the start of the series. He adopts Ki-tan after the latter saves him during an assassination attempt.

- Lee El as Ok Chae-ryung

She is a Chinese expat who was once Man-ok's secretary. It is later revealed that she is actually a lobbyist working for a secret organization which plans to obtain the vaccine for MK2, a lethal mutant virus. However, Jeong-eun injects the vaccine into Guk-Cheol. Chae-ryung now fronts as the owner of an art gallery. She offered to purchase Guk-cheol's blood for the vaccine; in exchange her organization would provide financial backing to Guk-cheol to adopt his Kang Ki-tan persona and exact revenge. Chae-ryung has an unrequited love for Ki-tan, and thus tries to keep him and Soo-yeon apart.

- Go Yoon as Cha Woo

Another Chinese expat who works together with Chae-ryung for the same secret organization.

=== Others ===
- Kim Won-hae as Min Byung-ho

A lawyer who is the closest thing to family that Soo-yeon has. He helps look out for her brother too, and also provides help to Ki-tan from time to time. He later starts a law firm with Soo-yeon.

- Jung Soon-won as Oh Jin-cheol / Cha Dong-soo
  - Jung Soo-hwan as young Cha Dong-soo

Jeong-eun's younger brother, who suffers from Lennox–Gastaut syndrome, thus requiring her to work hard to pay his medical fees. Later, his name was changed to Oh Jin-cheol, alongside his sister who adopted the name Oh Soo-yeon. Dong-soo is shown to have a photographic memory. He is murdered by Byun Il-jae in episode 24.

- Kim Myung-soo as Cha Joong-rak

Jeong-eun and Dong-soo's father, who worked as the head of security at Sudo Hospital when Guk-cheol was a teenager. He dies after being exposed to the MK2 virus.

- Nam Myung-ryul as Lee Joon-sik

Lee Guk-cheol's father.

- Nam Gi-ae as Jung Mi-ok

Lee Guk-cheol's mother.

- Lee Ah-hyun as Choi Ji-hye

A woman campaigning against the use of T9, a cancer-causing agent in Dodo Group's products.

- Shin Seung-hwan as Yang Dong-yi

A gangster boss who manages Do Gwang-woo's slush fund.

- Go In-bum as Kim Dae-woo

A corrupt former army general working with Hwang Jae-man.

- Kim Young-woong as Yeom Hyeong-gu

Yoo Seong-ae's direct supervisor in the NIS, whom she reports her infiltration activities in Dodo Group to. He is later revealed to be working for Hwang Jae-man.

- Lee Ga-ryeong as Hong Ee-jin

=== Cameo ===
- Bae Jong-ok as Jung Man-ok

Byun Il-jae's first wife and Guk-cheol's aunt. She is accidentally killed by Hwang Ji-soo.

- Sung Ji-ru as Go Joo-tae

A criminal hired by Byun Il-jae to kill Guk-cheol.

- Chen Bolin as Michael Chang

A wealthy Chinese businessman who was involved in the manufacture and distribution of counterfeit drugs, which affected Dodo Group.

- Lee Won-jong as Na Do-kwang

A scientist working on the vaccine for the MK2 virus. He is murdered by Oh Choong-dong and Ki-tan is framed for the crime.

== Ratings ==
- In the table below, the blue numbers represent the lowest ratings and the red numbers represent the highest ratings.
- NR denotes that the drama did not rank in the top 20 daily programs on that date.

Episode #	Original broadcast date	TNmS Ratings		AGB Nielsen Ratings	
Episode #	Original broadcast date	Nationwide	Seoul National Capital Area	Nationwide	Seoul National Capital Area
1	March 28, 2016	7.4% (NR)	8.1% (18th)	7.3% (NR)	7.8% (20th)
2	March 29, 2016	7.7% (19th)	8.3% (14th)	7.0% (20th)	7.8% (17th)
3	April 4, 2016	9.0% (21st)	10.3% (9th)	9.5% (14th)	10.6% (10th)
4	April 5, 2016	9.1% (13th)	9.7% (8th)	8.9% (13th)	9.5% (10th)
5	April 11, 2016	7.5% (NR)	8.2% (17th)	8.2% (NR)	9.3% (14th)
6	April 12, 2016	7.3% (20th)	7.3% (18th)	8.7% (13th)	9.7% (10th)
7	April 18, 2016	7.4% (NR)	8.4% (17th)	8.5% (NR)	9.5% (15th)
8	April 19, 2016	7.8% (17th)	8.4% (14th)	8.1% (19th)	9.1% (14th)
9	April 25, 2016	7.7% (NR)	9.2% (15th)	8.1% (NR)	8.7% (17th)
10	April 26, 2016	8.2% (17th)	8.8% (11th)	8.2% (17th)	9.0% (15th)
11	May 2, 2016	6.9% (NR)	7.7% (NR)	7.5% (NR)	8.2% (20th)
12	May 3, 2016	7.1% (NR)	8.5% (17th)	8.4% (NR)	9.3% (18th)
13	May 9, 2016	7.1% (NR)	8.2% (16th)	7.5% (NR)	8.4% (20th)
14	May 10, 2016	8.4% (18th)	9.0% (12th)	9.3% (16th)	10.2% (10th)
15	May 16, 2016	7.4% (NR)	7.8% (19th)	8.0% (20th)	8.9% (16th)
16	May 17, 2016	8.0% (19th)	8.5% (16th)	9.5% (10th)	10.3% (8th)
17	May 23, 2016	7.2% (NR)	8.2% (16th)	8.1% (NR)	8.8% (15th)
18	May 24, 2016	8.4% (14th)	9.5% (8th)	8.6% (15th)	9.4% (9th)
19	May 30, 2016	7.7% (NR)	7.6% (18th)	8.0% (19th)	8.7% (14th)
20	May 31, 2016	7.8% (17th)	8.1% (12th)	7.7% (14th)	8.3% (13th)
21	June 6, 2016	8.4% (17th)	10.4% (6th)	10.3% (6th)	11.4% (5th)
22	June 7, 2016	9.6% (9th)	10.2% (6th)	10.7% (5th)	11.7% (4th)
23	June 13, 2016	8.8% (12th)	10.5% (5th)	10.4% (10th)	11.4% (4th)
24	June 14, 2016	9.6% (9th)	10.7% (5th)	10.7% (6th)	11.5% (5th)
25	June 20, 2016	9.4% (11th)	10.7% (5th)	9.7% (12th)	10.4% (8th)
26	June 21, 2016	10.4% (8th)	11.7% (5th)	11.1% (6th)	11.9% (5th)
27	June 27, 2016	9.7% (9th)	10.7% (5th)	10.6% (8th)	11.7% (5th)
28	June 28, 2016	10.2% (8th)	10.7% (5th)	11.1% (6th)	11.9% (5th)
29	July 4, 2016	9.8% (15th)	10.8% (5th)	11.1% (8th)	12.2% (6th)
30	July 5, 2016	11.6% (9th)	12.0% (5th)	11.0% (10th)	11.8% (9th)
31	July 11, 2016	9.8% (14th)	10.3% (9th)	10.5% (11th)	10.5% (12th)
32	July 12, 2016	11.3% (10th)	11.9% (7th)	11.2% (8th)	11.8% (7th)
33	July 18, 2016	10.1% (11th)	10.7% (8th)	9.9% (12th)	9.7% (11th)
34	July 19, 2016	12.3% (6th)	13.6% (5th)	11.1% (7th)	11.2% (5th)
35	July 25, 2016	10.9% (11th)	12.3% (5th)	10.7% (8th)	11.5% (8th)
36	July 26, 2016	11.7% (7th)	12.6% (5th)	11.3% (8th)	11.0% (7th)
37	August 1, 2016	11.2% (9th)	11.6% (7th)	10.7% (7th)	10.9% (6th)
38	August 2, 2016	12.8% (6th)	12.9% (5th)	11.9% (6th)	12.2% (5th)
39	August 9, 2016	11.4% (7th)	11.4% (6th)	9.8% (6th)	10.0% (6th)
40	August 22, 2016	9.2% (15th)	8.9% (15th)	8.9% (12th)	9.2% (13th)
41	August 23, 2016	9.7% (12th)	10.0% (11th)	9.7% (10th)	9.5% (11th)
42	August 29, 2016	9.2% (16th)	9.7% (12th)	10.0% (11th)	10.3% (12th)
43	August 30, 2016	10.6% (10th)	11.4% (6th)	10.8% (8th)	11.0% (7th)
44	September 5, 2016	10.1% (11th)	11.0% (9th)	9.4% (11th)	9.7% (10th)
45	September 6, 2016	10.9% (8th)	11.7% (7th)	10.3% (8th)	10.3% (8th)
46	September 12, 2016	10.1% (16th)	11.4% (8th)	10.6% (12th)	10.9% (8th)
47	September 13, 2016	11.0% (8th)	10.7% (6th)	10.3% (7th)	10.4% (8th)
48	September 19, 2016	12.6% (8th)	13.1% (6th)	11.4% (9th)	11.7% (6th)
49	September 20, 2016	12.9% (7th)	12.9% (6th)	12.1% (6th)	12.7% (6th)
50	September 20, 2016	13.8% (5th)	14.0% (5th)	14.1% (5th)	15.1% (5th)
Average		9.5%	10.2%	9.7%	10.3%

== Remark ==
- Episode 39 wasn't aired on Monday August 8 due to broadcast of the 2016 Summer Olympics in Rio de Janeiro, Brazil. This episode was aired on Tuesday August 9, 2016.
- Episode 40 wasn't aired on August 15 and August 16 due to broadcast of the 2016 Summer Olympics in Rio de Janeiro, Brazil. This episode was aired on Monday August 22, 2016.

== Original soundtrack ==
=== OST Part 1 ===
No.	Title	Artist	Length
1.	"Know (알아)"	Zia	3:31
2.	"Know (알아)" (Inst.)		3:31
Total length:			7:02

=== OST Part 2 ===
No.	Title	Artist	Length
1.	"Am I Alright (괜찮은건지)"	Se7en	4:03
2.	"Am I Alright (괜찮은건지)" (Inst.)		4:03
Total length:			8:06

=== OST Part 3 ===
No.	Title	Artist	Length
1.	"Only With You (같이만 있자)"	Tei	4:10
2.	"Only With You (같이만 있자)" (Inst.)		4:10
Total length:			8:20

== International broadcast ==
- In Indonesia, the drama airs on Oh!K with subtitles the same day as the South Korean broadcast.
- In Singapore, the drama airs on Oh!K with subtitles the same day as the South Korean broadcast. It is also available to stream with subtitles 12 hours after its original broadcast on Viu.
- Vietnam: HTV2

== Accolades ==
Year	Award	Category	Recipient	Result
2016	5th APAN Star Awards	Excellence Award, Actor in a Serial Drama	Kang Ji-hwan	Nominated
2016	36th MBC Drama Awards	Top Excellence Award, Actor in a Special Project Drama	Kang Ji-hwan	Nominated
2016	36th MBC Drama Awards	Top Excellence Award, Actress in a Special Project Drama	Sung Yu-ri	Nominated
2016	36th MBC Drama Awards	Excellence Award, Actor in a Special Project Drama	Park Ki-woong	Nominated
2016	36th MBC Drama Awards	Excellence Award, Actress in a Special Project Drama	Jo Bo-ah	Nominated
2016	36th MBC Drama Awards	Best New Actress	Jo Bo-ah	Won
2016	36th MBC Drama Awards	Best New Actress	Lee Yeol-eum	Nominated
2016	36th MBC Drama Awards	Golden Acting Award, Actor in a Special Project Drama	Jeong Bo-seok	Nominated
2016	36th MBC Drama Awards	Golden Acting Award, Actor in a Special Project Drama	Jin Tae-hyun	Nominated
2016	36th MBC Drama Awards	Golden Acting Award, Actress in a Special Project Drama	Kim Bo-yeon	Nominated
2016	36th MBC Drama Awards	Golden Acting Award, Actress in a Special Project Drama	Lee El	Nominated
