= Oh Yeon-soo =

South Korean actress (born 1971)

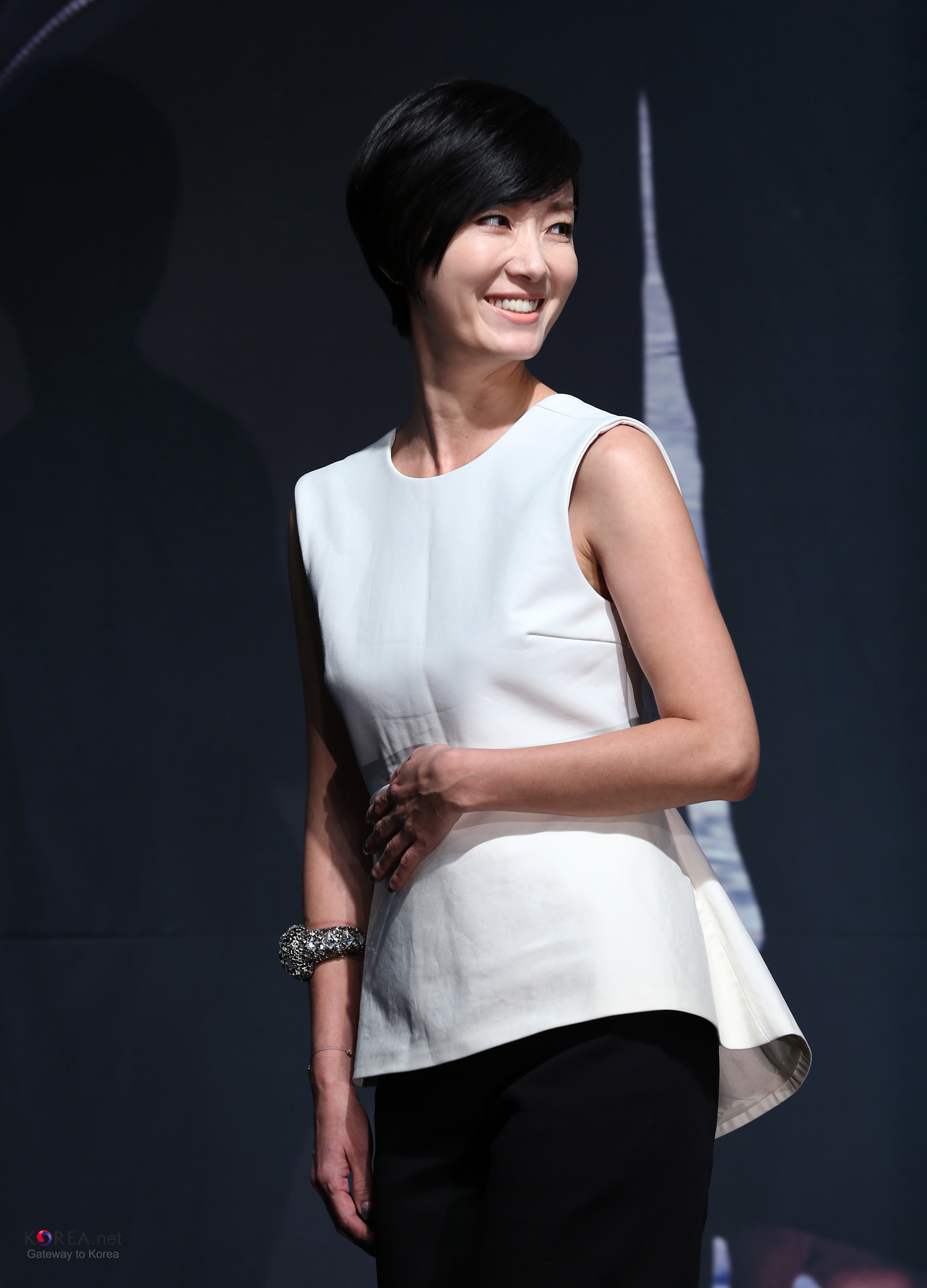
- Oh in February 2013
- Born: October 27, 1971 (age 55); Seoul, South Korea
- Other names: Oh Yun-soo; Oh Yeon-su
- Education: Dankook University - Theater and Film
- Occupation: Actress
- Years active: 1989–present
- Spouse: Son Ji-chang (m. 1998)
- Children: 2

Korean name
- Hangul: 오연수
- Hanja: 吳娟受
- RR: O Yeonsu
- MR: O Yŏnsu

Oh Yeon-soo (Korean: 오연수; born October 27, 1971) is a South Korean actress.

== Career ==
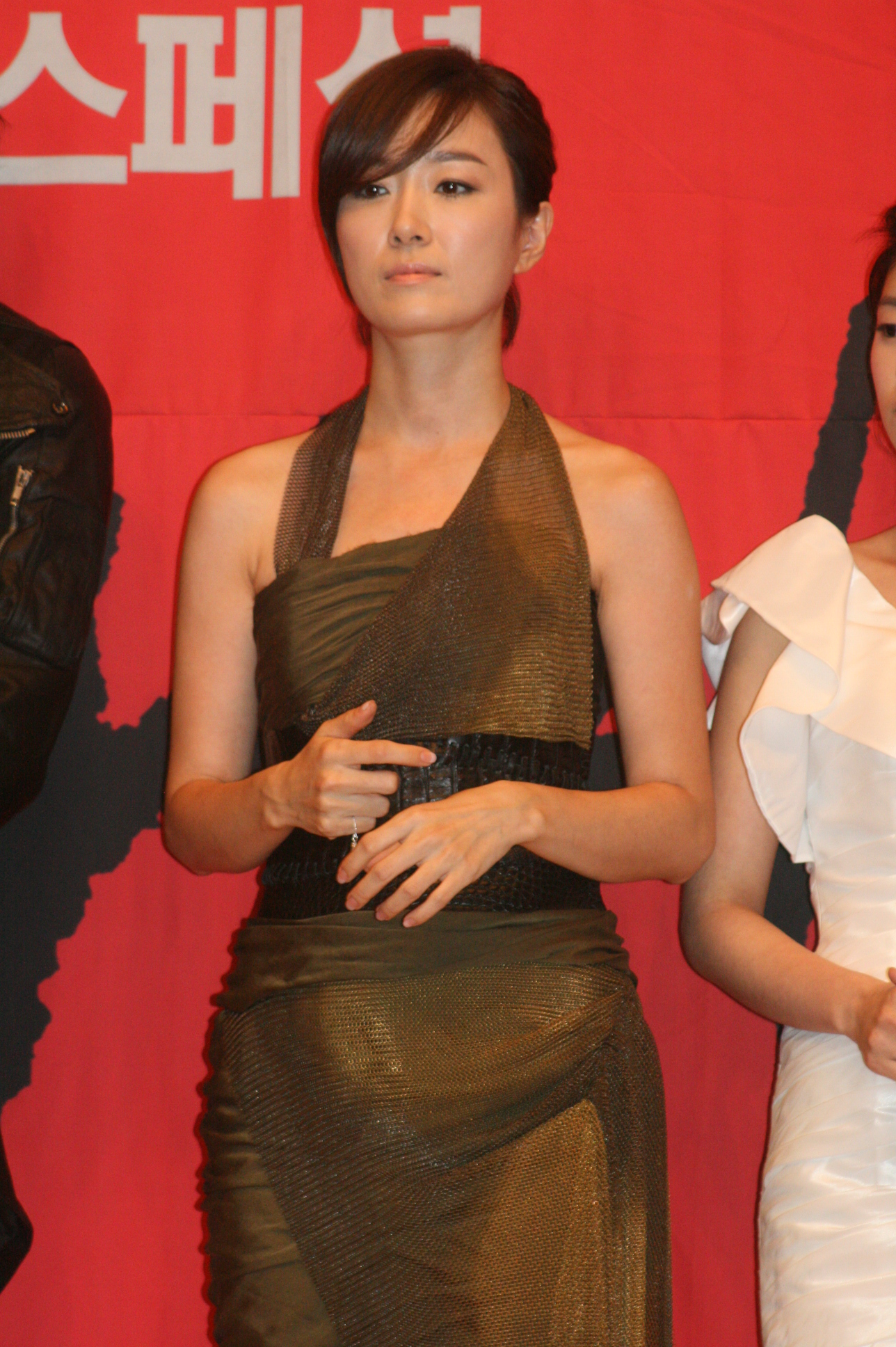
Oh at the Bad Guy press conference in 2010

Oh Yeon-soo made her debut in 1989 among a batch of actors who passed an open audition by broadcaster MBC, and she soon became popular for her innocent image. But since her marriage to fellow actor Son Ji-chang, Oh has had a career renaissance doing more mature roles. She played a single mother who rediscovers love in A Second Proposal, a discontented housewife in a rivalry with a top ballerina in The Queen Returns, and was cast as strong, supporting characters in the historical dramas Jumong, and Gyebaek. But Oh became best known for memorably portraying married women exploring adultery in the dark melodramas Bitter Sweet Life, and Bad Guy.

In 2022, she returned to small screen with after five years in Military Prosecutor Doberman. She portrayed a villainous military division commander who was the very first woman to achieve that position since the army founding.

== Filmography ==
=== Film ===
Year	Title	Role	Notes	Ref.
1992	The General's Son 3	Jang Eun-shil		
1992	Man Upstairs, Woman Downstairs	Yoo Young-hui		
1994	The Rules of the Game	Tae-sook		
1997	Fire Bird	Mi-ran		
1998	The Happenings	Hwa-yi		
1998	The Power of Kangwon Province	Ji-sook		
2013	Iris 2: The Movie	Choi Min		
2013	South Bound	Ahn Bong-hee		
2014	Tazza: The Hidden Card	Woman at Observatory	Cameo	

=== Television series ===
Year	Title	Role	Notes	Ref.
1990	The Dancing Gayageum	Moon Hee		
1991	Eyes of Dawn	Bong Sun		
1992	Sons and Daughters	Sung Ja		
1994	The Lonely Man	Boo Dang-shil		
1995	War and Love	Yang Seon-ok		
1996	Full Heart	Bo Ok		
1996	In The Name of Love	Kang Hye-won		
1996	Mom's Flag	Seo Yoon-hee		
1997	Revenge and Passion	Min Joo		
1998	Aim for Tomorrow	Go Eun-bi		
1998	Love and Success	Kim In-ae		
2001	Law of Marriage	Go Keum-se		
2002	Hard Love	Suh Kyung-joo		
2003	Snowman	Seo Yun-jung		
2004	Second Proposal	Jang Mi-young		
2005	Sad Goodbye	Park Yeo-jin		
2006	Jumong	Lady Yuhwa		
2008	Bitter Sweet Life	Yoon Hye-jin		
2009	The Queen Returns	Cha Do-kyung		
2010	Bad Guy	Hong Tae-ra		
2011	Gyebaek	Sa Taek-bi		
2013	Iris II: New Generation	Choi Min		
2014	Triangle	Hwang Shin-hye		
2017	Save Me	Cameo	Ep 1	
2017	Criminal Minds	Seo Hye-won	Ep 1–4	
2022	Military Prosecutor Doberman	Noh Hwa-young		
2024	Doubt	Yoon Ji-su		
TBA	Zero			

=== Television shows ===
Year	Title	Role	Notes	Ref.
2018	Carefree Travellers 2	Cast member	Episode 12–15	
2021	I Need Women	Cast member		

== Accolades ==
=== Awards and nominations ===
Name of the award ceremony, year presented, category, nominee of the award, and the result of the nomination
Award ceremony	Year	Category	Nominee / Work	Result	Ref.
Baeksang Arts Awards	1991	Best New Actress – Television	The Dancing Gayageum	Won	
Baeksang Arts Awards	1993	Best New Actress – Film	General's Son III	Won	
Blue Dragon Film Awards	1992	Best New Actress	General's Son III	Won	
Blue Dragon Film Awards	1994	Best Supporting Actress	The Rules of the Game	Nominated	
Blue Dragon Film Awards	1998	Best Supporting Actress	The Happenings	Nominated	
Chunsa Film Art Awards	1992	Best New Actress	Women Upstairs, Men Downstairs	Won	
KBS Drama Awards	1993	Excellence Award, Actress	Never on Sunday	Won	
KBS Drama Awards	1994	Popularity Award, Actress	Never on Sunday	Nominated	
KBS Drama Awards	2002	Excellence Award, Actress	Hard Love	Nominated	
KBS Drama Awards	2004	Top Excellence Award, Actress	A Second Proposal	Won	
KBS Drama Awards	2009	Top Excellence Award, Actress	The Queen Returns	Nominated	
MBC Drama Awards	1990	Best New Actress	The Dancing Gayageum	Won	
MBC Drama Awards	1998	Top Excellence Award, Actress	Revenge and Passion	Won	
MBC Drama Awards	2006	Special Award, Actress in a Large-scale Historical Drama	Jumong	Won	
MBC Drama Awards	2006	Top Excellence Award, Actress	Jumong	Nominated	
MBC Drama Awards	2008	Top Excellence Award, Actress	Bitter Sweet Life	Nominated	
SBS Drama Awards	2010	Top Excellence Award, Actress in a Drama Special	Bad Guy	Nominated	
Style Icon Awards	2010	Fashionista	Oh Yeon-soo	Won	

=== State and cultural honors ===
State and cultural honors
Country	Organization or ceremony	Year	Honor or Award	Ref.
South Korea	37th Taxpayers' Day (Note: Honors are given on Taxpayers' Day, organized by National Tax Service, Taxpayers' Day in Korea is March 3. An award ceremony is held annually, during which individuals and corporations receive commendation for being model taxpayers.)	2003	Presidential Commendation as Exemplary Taxpayer	
