= Moon Hee-kyung =

South Korean actress (born 1965)

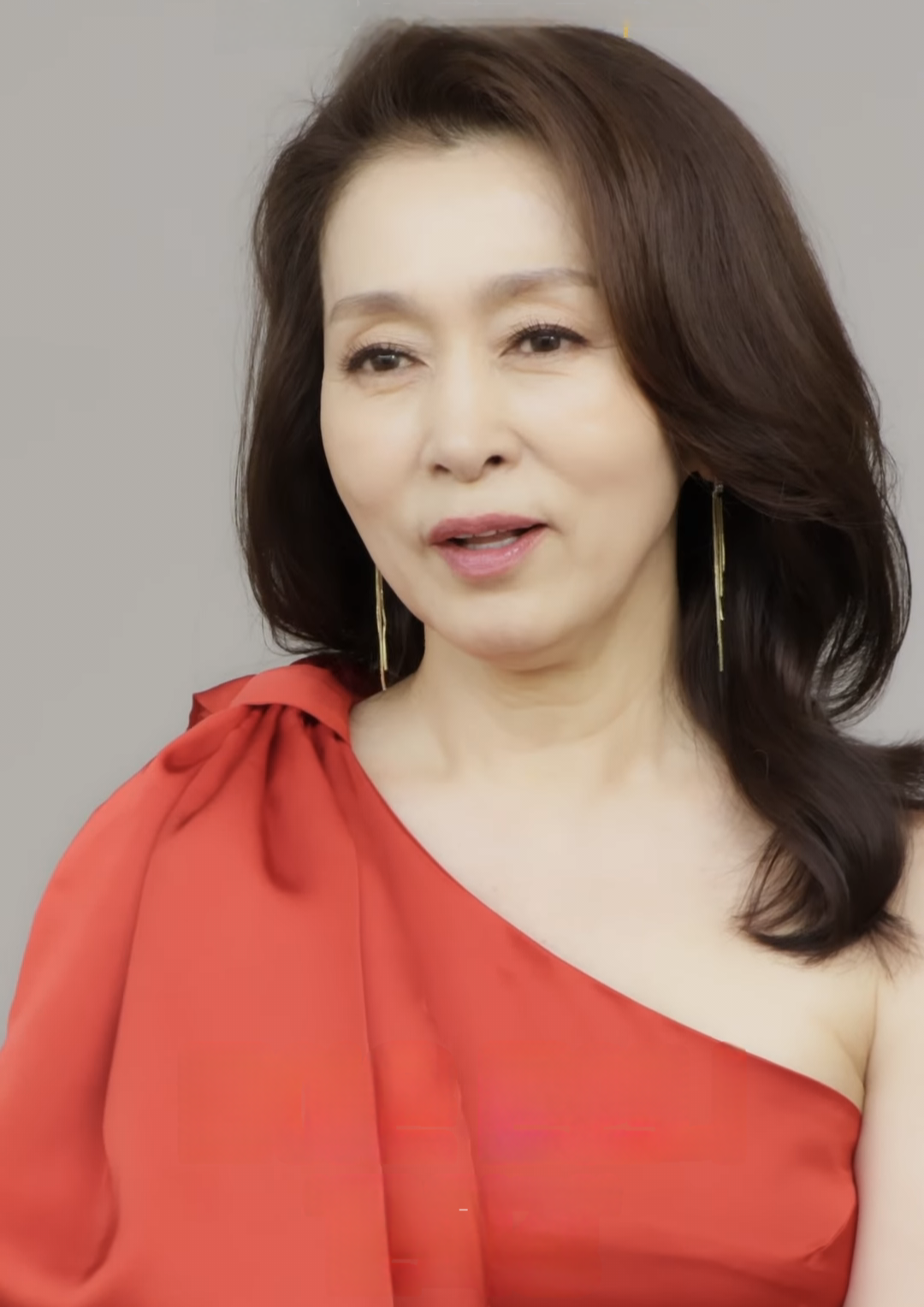
- Moon in May 2024
- Born: December 22, 1965 (age 60); Seogwipo, Jeju Island, South Korea
- Education: Sookmyung Women's University (B.A. in French Language and Literature)
- Occupation: Actress
- Years active: 1987–present
- Agent: Think Entertainment
- Children: 1

Korean name
- Hangul: 문희경
- Hanja: 文熙景
- RR: Mun Huigyeong
- MR: Mun Hŭigyŏng

Moon Hee-kyung (Korean: 문희경; born December 22, 1965) is a South Korean actress. Moon made her acting debut in musical theatre in 1995. She has also played supporting roles in films and television series, notably Skeletons in the Closet (also known as Shim's Family) in 2007.

== Early life and education ==
Moon was born on December 22, 1965 in Harye-ri, Namwon-eup, Seogwipo, Jeju Island, South Korea. She graduated from Sookmyung Women's University.

== Career ==
In 2016, Moon became the only person to compete in both seasons of Tribe of Hip Hop.

== Other activities ==
=== Philanthropy ===
In February 2023, Moon donated 1 million won to Hometown Love Donation.

== Filmography ==
=== Film ===
Year	Title	Role	Notes	Ref.
2007	Skeletons in the Closet	Oh Hee-kyung		
2008	Antique	Muffler		
2008	Happy Mija	Mi-ja	Short film	
2009	Possessed	Kyeong-ja		
2010	Try to Remember	Eun-gyo's mother	Cameo appearance	
2011	My Black Mini Dress	Yoo-min's mother	Cameo appearance	
2011	The Last Blossom	Doctor Yoon	Cameo appearance	
2011	If You Were Me 5	Woman at the hospital	Cameo appearance	
2013	The Hero	Je-hyun's mother	Cameo appearance	
2014	You Are My Vampire	Hwang Deok-hee		
2015	The Treacherous	Discipline sanggung		
2016	The Legend of a Mermaid	Ok-ja		

=== Television series ===
Year	Title	Role	Notes	Ref.
2008	My Life's Golden Age	Lee Man-sook		
2009	Iris	Choi Seung-hee's aunt		
2010	Golden House	Noh Mae-ja		
2010	Giant	Oh Nam-sook		
2010	KBS Drama Special: "Hot Coffee"	Ji-sook		
2010	Dr. Champ	Go Mi-ja		
2011	49 Days	Bang Hwa-joon		
2011	Bravo, My Love!	Sunny Park		
2011	The Great Gift	Yoon Joo-hee		
2011	Bride of the Sun	Gong Kyung-sook		
2012	The Moon and Stars for You	Go Mi-ja		
2012	The Birth of a Family	Park Geum-ok		
2012	The Great Seer	Daemuryeo		
2013	Good Doctor	Mrs. Jang		
2013	KBS Drama Special: "Eun-guk and the Ugly Duckling"	Aunt		
2014	The Noblesse	Park Kyung-ja		
2014	Inspiring Generation	Nun director		
2014	You're All Surrounded	Yoo Ae-yeon		
2014	The Idle Mermaid	Yoon Jin-ah's mother		
2014	Naeil's Cantabile	Seol Nae-il's ex teacher		
2014	You Are the Only One	Park Joo-ran		
2015	My Heart Twinkle Twinkle	Music professor		
2015	Rosy Lovers	Emma Lee		
2016	Secrets of Women	Yoo Jang-mi		
2016	Second to Last Love	Na Choon-woo		
2017	The Lady in Dignity	Mrs. Geum		
2017	Whisper	Yoon Jung-ok		
2017	Because This Is My First Life	Jo Myung-ji		
2017	Sisters-in-Law	Yoo So-hee		
2018	Tempted	Oh Se-ri		
2018	Nice Witch	Kim Gong-joo		
2018	Ms. Ma, Nemesis	Madame Park		
2019	Love in Sadness	Lim Yeon-hwa		
2019	Welcome to Waikiki 2	Min seok's mother	Cameo (episode 2)	
2019	Home for Summer	Heo Kyeong-ae		
2019	Graceful Family	Ha Yeong-seo		
2020	Hospital Playlist	Seok-hyung's mother	Season 1–2	
2020	Do Do Sol Sol La La Sol	Gong Mi-sook		
2020	No Matter What	Noh Geum-suk		
2021	Show Window: The Queen's House	Kim Kang-im		
2022	The Killer's Shopping List	Young Sun		
2022	Doctor Lawyer	Jang Jeong-ok		
2022	Behind Every Star	Kang Kyung-ok		
2023	Delivery Man		Cameo	
2023	Battle for Happiness	Im Kang-suk		

=== Web series ===
Year	Title	Role	Notes	Ref.
2020–2022	No, Thank You	Park Ki-dong	Season 1–2	

=== Television shows ===
Year	Title	Role	Notes	Ref.
2022	We Are Family	Cast Member		
2022–2023	Mr. Trot	Master	Season 2	

== Discography ==
=== Singles ===
Title	Year	Album
"Let's Go to Boryeong" (with Jeong Eui-song)	2021	Non-album single
"Let's Go to Daecheon"	2021	Non-album single

== Musical theatre ==
Year	Title	Role	Ref.
1995	Flower Train		
	The Last Empress		
2003	One Fine Spring Day		
2003	Urinetown		
2004	Beauty and the Beast	Mrs. Potts	
2005	Mamma Mia!		
2006	The Lower Depths	Tanya	
2006	Menopause	Professional Woman	
2008	Nine	Liliane La Fleur	
2023	Spring Again	Jin-suk	

== Ambassadorship ==
- Public relations ambassador of Boryeong, South Chungcheong Province (2022)
- Public relations ambassador of 2022 Boryeong Marine Mud Expo (2022)

== Awards and nominations ==
Name of the award ceremony, year presented, category, nominee of the award, and the result of the nomination
Award ceremony	Year	Category	Nominee / Work	Result	Ref.
Busan Film Critics Awards	2007	Best Supporting Actress	Skeletons in the Closet	Won	
Korea Musical Awards	2004	Best Supporting Actress	Beauty and the Beast	Won	
MBC Riverside Song Festival	1987	Grand Prize (Daesang)	Moon Hee-kyung	Won	
SBS Drama Awards	2018	Best Supporting Actress	Ms. Ma, Nemesis	Nominated	
