= Kim Il-woo (actor, born 1963) =

South Korean actor

- Born: June 19, 1963 (age 63); South Korea
- Education: Chung-Ang University - B.A. in Theater and Film
- Occupation: Actor
- Years active: 1985–present

Korean name
- Hangul: 김일우
- RR: Gim Ilu
- MR: Kim Iru

Kim Il-woo (born June 19, 1963) is a South Korean actor.

== Filmography ==
=== Television series ===
Year	Title	Role	Network
1995	Blowing of the Wind	Park Soo-chang	KBS2
1996	Apple Blossom's Fragrance	Hyun-seok	MBC
1997	Revenge and Passion	Charlie Kim	MBC
2000	Tough Guy's Love	Kim Ji-seok	KBS2
2001	Blue Mist	Noh Kyung-ho	KBS2
2001	This Is Love	Yun Jung-seok	KBS1
2002	Hard Love		KBS2
2003	Briar Flower	Shirley Kim	KBS1
2004	Something Happened in Bali	Jung Il-min	SBS
2004	Little Women	SBC script supervisor	SBS
2004	A Second Proposal	Song Jae-won	KBS2
2004	Toji, the Land	Jo Yong-ha	SBS
2004	Stained Glass		SBS
2005	Super Rookie	Director Song	MBC
2005	A Farewell to Sorrow	Han Sung-kyu	KBS2
2005	Sweet Spy	Song Hyun-chul	MBC
2006	One Day Suddenly	Na Young-chun	SBS
2006	Over the Rainbow	Choi Nam-ki	MBC
2006	Billie Jean, Look at Me	Uncle	MBC
2007	Heaven & Earth	Park Myung-tae	KBS1
2007	Catching Up with Gangnam Moms	Do Sang-sik	SBS
2008	Bitter Sweet Life	Shin Jung-ho	MBC
2008	My Pitiful Sister	Lee Duk-san	KBS1
2009	Enjoy Life	Na Bong-goo	MBC
2010	Big Thing	Oh Jae-bong	SBS
2010	Pure Pumpkin Flower	Oh Geum-bok	SBS
2011	My Love By My Side	Go Jin-taek	SBS
2011	Warrior Baek Dong-soo	Gim Han Goo	SBS
2011	Happy and	Man-soo (episode 4)	Channel A
2012	History of a Salaryman	Jang Ryang	SBS
2012	Fashion King	Jung Man-ho	SBS
2012	Dr. Jin	Yoo Hong-pil	MBC
2012	My Lover, Madame Butterfly	Lee Sung-ryong	SBS
2013	Iris II: New Generation	Kang Cheol-hwan	KBS2
2013	Ugly Alert	Shin Tae-il	SBS
2014	What Happens to My Family?	Kwon Ki-chan	KBS2
2015	Kill Me, Heal Me	Cha Young-pyo	MBC
2015	The Merchant: Gaekju 2015	Maeng Gu-beom	KBS2
2016	Beautiful Gong Shim	Suk Dae Hwang	SBS
2018	A Poem a Day	Min-ho's father	tvN
2018	Love to the End	Kang Je-hyuk	MBC
2023	The Escape of the Seven	Chairman Shim	SBS

=== Film ===
Year	Title	Role
1998	First Kiss	Hong Cherry's manager
2013	IRIS 2: The Movie	Kang Cheol-hwan
2017	Race to Freedom: Um Bok Dong	Bicycle store owner
2018	Ireesha, The Daughter of Elf-king	Robbie's voice

=== Variety show ===
Year	Title	Network	Note	Ref.
2015~2017	The Fab Singles	SBS	Episode 3 – 54, 94, Cast Member	
2020~2011	Mr. House Husband 2	KBS2	Episode 155 – 200, Cast Member	

== Awards and nominations ==
=== Actor ===
Year	Award	Category	Nominated work	Result
2006	SBS Drama Awards	Best Supporting Actor in a Weekend/Daily Drama	One Day Suddenly	Nominated
2010	SBS Drama Awards	Best Supporting Actor in a Weekend/Daily Drama	Pure Pumpkin Flower	Nominated
2012	20th Korea Culture and Entertainment Awards	Excellence Award, Actor in a Drama		Won

=== Entertainer ===
Year	Award ceremony	Category	Nominated work	Result	Ref.
2020	18th KBS Entertainment Awards	Rookie Award in Reality Category	Mr. House Husband 2	Won	
