= Dr. Champ =

2010 South Korean television series

- Promotional poster
- Genre: Romance; Sports
- Written by: Noh Ji-seol
- Directed by: Park Hyung-ki
- Starring: Kim So-yeon; Uhm Tae-woong; Jung Gyu-woon; Cha Ye-ryun
- Music by: Choi Cheol-ho
- Country of origin: South Korea
- Original language: Korean
- No. of episodes: 16

Production
- Producer: Lee Hee-soo
- Production location: Korea
- Running time: Monday & Tuesday 20:55 (KST)

Original release
- Network: SBS TV
- Release: 27 September – 16 November 2010

Dr. Champ (Korean: 닥터챔프) is a 2010 South Korean television series about a doctor caught in a love triangle between a judo athlete and a crippled doctor who was once a speed-skating star.

== Cast ==
- Kim So-yeon as Kim Yeon Woo
- Uhm Tae-woong as Lee Do Wook
- Jung Gyu-woon as Park Ji Heon
- Cha Ye-ryun as Kang Hee Young
- Ma Dong-seok as Oh Jung Dae
- Jung Suk-won as Yoo Sang Bong
- Kim Hyung-bum as Choi Ham Shik
- Yum Dong-hyun as Jung Ho Chang
- Lee Si-eon as Heo Taek Woo
- Shin Dong-hee as Kang Woo Ram
- Jung Ui-kap as Choi Dae Sub
- Moon Hee-kyung as Go Mi Ja (Yeon Woo's mother)
- Heo Joon-suk as Kim Kyung Woo (Yeon Woo's older brother)
- Yoon Bong-gil as Uhm Dong Ho
- Cha Do-jin as Go Bum
- Kim Ga-eun as Pi Jung Ah
- Kang So-ra as Kwon Yoo Ri
- Seo Hyun-suk as Chae Eun Suk
- Ko Jun as Chang Soo
- Kang Ki-hwa as Go Eun Mi
- Jo Min-ki as Professor Seo (cameo)
- Han Bo-bae as Jo Min Ji (cameo, ep1)
- Nam Hyun-hee (남현희) as fencing athlete (cameo)
- Yoo Sang-chul (유상철) as youth soccer coach (cameo)
- Kim Byung-man as Im Ki Man (cameo)
- Min Hyo-rin as nurse (cameo, ep16)
- Onew as doctor (cameo, ep16)
- Song Ji-eun
