= Jung Gyu-woon =

South Korean actor (born 1982)

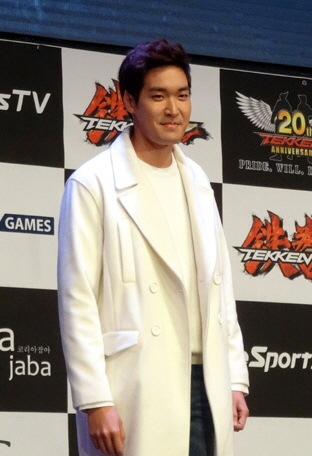
- Jung in January 2015
- Born: June 28, 1982 (age 44); Seoul, South Korea
- Occupation: Actor
- Years active: 2004–present
- Agent: Dear ENT
- Spouse(s): Unknown (m. 2014; div. 2016) Unknown (m. 2017)

Korean name
- Hangul: 정겨운
- RR: Jeong Gyeoun
- MR: Chŏng Kyŏun

Jung Gyu-woon (Korean: 정겨운; born June 28, 1982) is a South Korean actor.

== Career ==
Jung Gyu-woon made acting his debut in 2004 with the mobile drama Five Stars. He first gained notice in 2008 when he took two contrasting roles — as a crazy young executive in Bitter Sweet Life and a calm and patient boyfriend who suffers for love in Women of the Sun.

His popularity grew with the 2009 melodramas Again, My Love, and Loving You a Thousand Times; the latter became the first Korean drama exported to Bulgaria. In 2010 to 2011, Jung began to get cast in leading roles, which included a judo athlete training for the Olympics in Dr. Champ, a cop working in the violent crimes division in forensic medical series Sign, and a man who falls for a maid in Romance Town.

Jung received the best reviews of his career yet for his portrayal of a corporate spy in 2012's History of a Salaryman. This was followed by the family drama Wonderful Mama (2013), the time travel thriller God's Gift: 14 Days (2014), and the makeover romantic comedy Birth of a Beauty (2014).

In October 2021, Jung signed a contract with Dear ENT.

== Personal life ==
=== Relationships ===
Jung married his girlfriend, a former model turned web designer, on April 5, 2014. On March 30, 2016, it was reported that he has divorced.

In April 2017, Jung confirmed to be in a romantic relationship with a non-celebrity. According to Jung's agency, he will be marrying for the second time on September 30, 2017. His fiancé is revealed to be a music student who majored in classical piano. The couple has been dating for one year before deciding to marry.

== Filmography ==
=== Television series ===
Year	Title	Role
2004	Five Stars	
2005	Hello My Teacher	Lee Ho-joon
2006	Dr. Kkang	Detective Bae
2006	MBC Best Theater "The Man's Jealousy"	
2007	A Happy Woman	Choi Joon-ho
2008	Robber	Jang Tae-oh
2008	Bitter Sweet Life	Kang Sung-goo
2008	Women in the Sun	Cha Dong-woo
2009	Again, My Love	Lee Min-soo
2009	Loving You a Thousand Times	Baek Kang-ho
2009	Hometown Legends "The Grudge Island"	Nam Sang-hun
2010	Dr. Champ	Park Ji-heon
2011	Sign	Choi Yi-han
2011	Romance Town	Kang Gun-woo
2012	History of a Salaryman	Choi Hang-woo
2012	Take Care of Us, Captain	Top star (cameo)
2012	I Need Romance 2012	Kim Han-sub (cameo)
2012	The King's Doctor	Crown Prince Sohyeon (cameo)
2013	Love in Memory	
2013	Wonderful Mama	Jang Hoon-nam
2013	After School: Lucky or Not	(cameo, episodes 4, 12)
2014	God's Gift: 14 Days	Hyun Woo-jin
2014	Wife Scandal - The Wind Rises	The wife's lover (episode 2: "Foolish Love")
2014	Birth of a Beauty	Lee Kang-joon
2015	To Be Continued	Taxi driver (cameo)
2015	Oh My Venus	Im Woo-shik
2017	You Are Too Much	Park Hyun-joon
2024	Red Swan	Kim Yong-guk

=== Film ===
Year	Title	Role
2006	Time	Man 3
2012	The Reflection (short film)	Ja-woon
2012	The Spies	Assistant manager Woo
2014	The Legacy	Han Jung-do
2015	The Cat Funeral	Hyun-suk
2016	The Uninvited – A Welcome Guest	Ji-hoon
2016	The Disappearance: Missing Wife	Jo Tae-shik

=== Television shows ===
Year	Title	Notes
2012	Adrenaline	Host
2012	SBS Gayo Daejeon - The Color of K-POP	
2015	Real Men Season 2	Season 2 member
2018	Same Bed, Different Dreams 2: You Are My Destiny	Cast Members Episode 81-present
2021	Divorced Singles	Host
2021	Divorced Singles 2	Host
2021	The Village Shop	Cast Member
2022	Divorced Singles 3	Host

=== Music video appearances ===
Year	Song title	Artist
2005	"Woman"	Big Mama
2008	"Only You"	KCM
2009	"Goodbye My Love"	8Eight

== Theater ==
Year	Title		Role	Venue	Date	Ref.
Year	English	Korean	Role	Venue	Date	Ref.
2023	Etude	에뛰드		Hyehwa Art Space	March 17 to March 26	

== Awards and nominations ==
Year	Award	Category	Nominated work	Result
2008	KBS Drama Awards	Best New Actor	Women of the Sun	Won
2009	45th Baeksang Arts Awards	Best New Actor (TV)	Women of the Sun	Nominated
2009	Andre Kim Best Star Awards	Star Award	—N/a	Won
2009	SBS Drama Awards	New Star Award	Loving You a Thousand Times	Won
2009	SBS Drama Awards	Excellence Award, Actor in a Serial Drama	Loving You a Thousand Times	Nominated
2009	KBS Drama Awards	Excellence Award, Actor in a Mid-length Drama	Again, My Love	Nominated
2010	SBS Drama Awards	Excellence Award, Actor in a Special Planning Drama	Dr. Champ	Nominated
2011	SBS Drama Awards	Excellence Award, Actor in a Drama Special	Sign, Dr. Champ	Won
2011	KBS Drama Awards	Excellence Award, Actor in a Mid-length Drama	Romance Town	Nominated
2012	SBS Drama Awards	Excellence Award, Actor in a Miniseries	History of a Salaryman	Nominated
2013	SBS Drama Awards	Top Excellence Award, Actor in a Weekend/Daily Drama	Wonderful Mama	Nominated
2014	SBS Drama Awards	Excellence Award, Actor in a Miniseries	God's Gift: 14 Days	Nominated
