= Lee Beom-soo =

South Korean actor (born 1969)

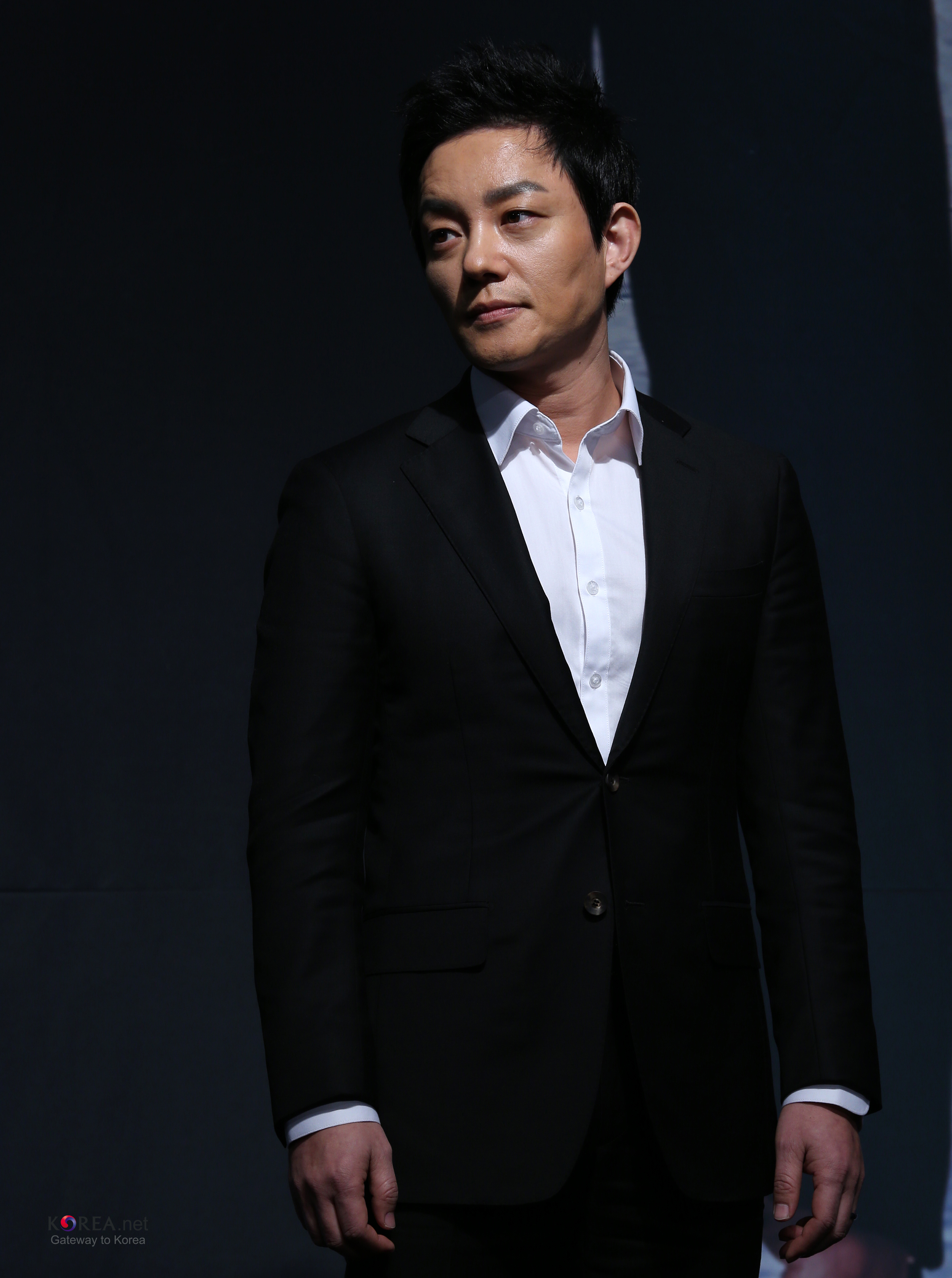
- Lee in 2013
- Born: October 16, 1969 (age 57); Cheongju, North Chungcheong Province, South Korea
- Education: Chung-ang University
- Years active: 1990–present
- Agent: Y1 Entertainment
- Spouse: Lee Yoon-jin (m. 2010; div. 2026)
- Children: 2

Korean name
- Hangul: 이범수
- Hanja: 李凡秀
- RR: I Beomsu
- MR: I Pŏmsu

Lee Beom-soo (born October 16, 1969) is a South Korean actor. He is well known for his role in Singles (2003), Giant (2010), On Air (2008), Surgeon Bong Dal-hee (2007), as well as in History of a Salaryman (2012).

== Career ==
Lee enrolled in the Department of Theater at Chung-ang University in Seoul in 1988. He made his acting debut in the 1990 film Kurae, Kakkumun Hanulul Boja (Yes, Let’s Look Up At the Sky Now and Again). Following his debut, he appeared in films including The Ginkgo Bed, City of the Rising Sun, The Anarchists, Jungle Juice and Wet Dreams, but it was the 2003 film Singles that made him rise to stardom. The Korean press has dubbed him "The Little Giant of Chungmuro" (Korean equivalent of Hollywood). He received a 2011 Seoul Art & Culture Award for best TV drama actor for his role in Giant.

== Personal life ==
=== Relationships ===
In 2003, Lee married a college classmate, but got divorced after 5 months of marriage. It was reported that the reason for divorce was familial conflict, financial disputes, and differences in personality. However, it is said that the two did not register their marriage, so there were no issues to their family register.

In May 2010, he married a former news anchor and English interpreter, Lee Yoon-jin, 14 years his junior. Shortly after the May wedding ceremony, they announced that they were expecting their first child. Their daughter, Lee So-eul, was born on March 1, 2011. On February 21, 2014, their son, Lee Da-eul was born.

On March 16, 2024, after 14 years of marriage, Lee's agency Y1 Entertainment confirmed reports of him and his wife's separation and that the couple were in the process of negotiating their divorce. They were involved in a divorce dispute, with his wife taking to social media to accuse the actor of being unfaithful and uncooperative with divorce proceedings. She also alleged that he prevented her from seeing their son. Through a statement released by his agency, Lee denied his estranged wife's claims.

On February 6, 2026, Lee's agency confirmed that the couple had reached an amicable agreement and finalized their divorce.

== Filmography ==
=== Film ===
Year	Title	Role	Notes /Ref(s).
2024	The Roundup: Punishment	Jang Tae-soo	
2023	The Roundup: No Way Out	Jang Tae-soo	
2022	20th Century Girl	School teacher	Special appearance; Netflix film
2022	Come Back Home	Kang Don	
2019	Race to Freedom	Hwang Jae-ho	
2018	Unfinished	Oh Young-min	
2016	Foolish Plans	Cha Byung-Hyun	
2016	Operation Chromite	Lim Gye-Jin	
2016	Unforgettable	Yong-chul (cameo)	
2015	The Beauty Inside	Woo-jin	
2014	The Divine Move	Sal-soo	
2013	Iris 2	Yoo Jung-won	
2013	Three Mirrors	Director	
2012	Over My Dead Body	Baek Hyun-chul	
2009	The Descendants of Hong Gil-dong	Hong Moo-hyuk	
2009	The Weird Missing Case of Mr.J	Jung Seung-pil	
2009	More Than Blue	Cha Ju-hwan	
2009	Lifting King Kong	Lee Ji-bong	
2008	Death Bell	Hwang Chang-ok	
2007	Project Makeover	Oh Tae-hoon (cameo)	
2006	My Wife is a Gangster 3	Ki-chul	
2006	200 Pounds Beauty	hit taxi driver (cameo)	
2006	Mission Sex Control	Byeon Suk-gu	
2006	The City of Violence	Pil-ho	
2006	Forbidden Quest	Gwang-heon	
2005	Lee Dae-ro Can't Die	Lee Dae-ro	
2005	She's on Duty	detective (cameo)	
2004	Superstar Mr. Gam	Gam Sa-yong	
2004	Au Revoir, UFO	Sang-hyun	
2003	Please Teach Me English	subway passenger (cameo)	
2003	Oh! Brothers	Oh Bong-goo	
2003	Singles	Jeong-jun	
2002	The Romantic President	bum in subway station (cameo)	
2002	Make It Big	Ji-hyeong	
2002	Wet Dreams	Byung-chul	
2002	Jungle Juice	Cheol-su	
2001	Very good	Photographer	
2001	One Fine Spring Day		
2001	Bungee Jumping of Their Own	Lee Dae-geun	
2000	Just Do It!	Won Kwang-tae	
2000	Anarchists	Dol-seok	
1999	Love		
1999	A Growing Business		
1999	City of the Rising Sun	Byeong-guk	
1998	If the Sun Rises in the West		
1998	Scent of a Man		
1998	The Soul Guardians		
1997	The Contact		
1997	Lam ent		
1996	Ghost Mamma		
1996	The Gingko Bed		
1995	A Hot Roof		
1991	Teenage Coup		
1990	Well, Sometimes Let's Look at the Sky		

=== Television series ===
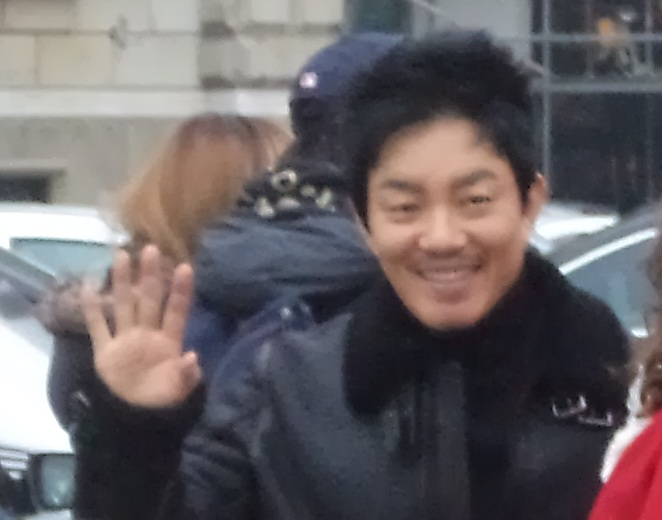
Lee at the Iris II: New Generation shooting in Hungary, 2012 November

Year	Title	Role
2021	Dramaworld 2	Vampire Head (Cameo)
2020	Private Lives	Choi Yong Jin (ep16)
2016	Moorim School: Saga of the Brave	Wang Hao (cameo)
2015	Last	Kwak Heung-sam
2014	Triangle	Jang Dong-soo
2013	Prime Minister & I	Prime Minister Kwon Yool
2013	Iris II: New Generation	Yoo Joong-won
2012	Dr. Jin	Lee Ha-weung
2012	History of a Salaryman	Yoo Bang
2010	Giant	Lee Kang-Mo
2008	On Air (SBS, 2008)	Jang Ki-joon
2007	Surgeon Bong Dal-hee	Ahn Joong-geun
2007	If in Love... Like Them	
1999	Love Story Ep 2 "Message"	

=== Web series ===
Year	Title	Role	Ref.
2025	Mercy for None	Shim Seong-won	
2025	Villains	Cha Ki-tae	

=== Variety shows ===
Year	Title	Role	Episode
2016	The Return of Superman	Himself, with his children	117–182
2020	Sea Police 2	Main cast	1–6

=== Music video appearances ===
Year	Artist	Title
2006	SG Wannabe	"Precious History"
2007	SG Wannabe	"Arirang"
2007	Brown Eyes	"Already One Year"
2007	Kim Jong-wook	"Bad Guy"
2011	WE	"The Rain"

== Awards and nominations ==
Year	Award	Category	Nominated work
2006	5th Korea Film Awards	Best Supporting Actor Award	The City of Violence
2006	14th Chunsa Film Festival	Best Supporting Actor Award	The City of Violence
2007	44th Grand Bell Awards	Popularity Award	The City of Violence
2007	43rd Baeksang Arts Awards	Popularity Award	Surgeon Bong Dal-hee
2007	SBS Drama Awards	Best Couple Award with Lee Yo-won	Surgeon Bong Dal-hee
2007	SBS Drama Awards	Top Ten Star Award	Surgeon Bong Dal-hee
2007	SBS Drama Awards	Producers' Choice Award	Surgeon Bong Dal-hee
2007	1st Korea Movie Star Awards	Special Actor Award	200 Pounds Beauty
2008	Mnet 20's Choice Awards	Hot Male Drama Star	On Air
2009	29th The Korean Association of Film Critics Awards	Best Actor Award	Lifting King Kong
2009	32nd KOREA Gold Awards Festival	Best Male Actor Popularity Award	Lifting King Kong
2010	SBS Drama Awards	Top Excellent Award, Special Planning Drama-Actor	Giant
2010	SBS Drama Awards	Top Ten Star Award	Giant
2010	18th Korea Culture & Entertainment Awards	Talent Section Acting Award	Giant
2011	Seoul Art & Culture Awards	Drama Section Best Acting Award	Giant
2013	KBS Drama Awards	Best Couple Award with Im Yoona	Prime Minister & I
2016	KBS Entertainment Awards	Top Excellent Award, Variety Show Actor	The Return of Superman
2016	53rd Daejong Film Award	Hana Financial Group Popularity Award	Operation Chromite
2018	26th Korea Culture and Entertainment Awards	Best Actor	Unfinished
