= Giant (TV series) =

2010 South Korean television series

- Promotional poster
- Hangul: 자이언트
- RR: Jaieonteu
- MR: Chaiŏnt'ŭ
- Genre: Period drama
- Written by: Jang Young-chul; Jung Kyung-soon
- Directed by: Yoo In-shik; Lee Chang-min
- Starring: Lee Beom-soo; Park Jin-hee; Park Sang-min; Hwang Jung-eum; Joo Sang-wook; Jeong Bo-seok; Lee Moon-sik
- Music by: Kim Joon-seok; Jeong Se-rin
- Country of origin: South Korea
- Original language: Korean
- No. of episodes: 60

Production
- Executive producer: Oh Se-jang
- Producers: Lee Myung-woo; Kim Kwang-soo; Jang Gil-young
- Camera setup: Multi-camera
- Production company: JS Pictures
- Budget: ₩10 billion

Original release
- Network: SBS TV
- Release: May 10 – December 7, 2010

Giant (Korean: 자이언트) is a 2010 South Korean television series starring Lee Beom-soo, Park Jin-hee, Park Sang-min, Hwang Jung-eum, Joo Sang-wook, and Jeong Bo-seok. It aired on SBS from May 10 to December 7, 2010, every Monday and Tuesday at 21:55 (KST) for 60 episodes. Giant is a sprawling period drama about three siblings' quest for revenge during the economic boom of 1970–1980s Korea. Tragically separated during childhood, the three reunite as adults and set out to avenge their parents' deaths, their fates playing out against a larger tide of power, money, politics, and the growth of a city. This drama also featured several scenes references to several real-life events in this country during 1980s and 1990s, such as Samchung re-education camp, Gwangju Uprising, and the Sampoong Department Store collapse.

== Synopsis ==
The plot revolves around the lives of the three Lee children: Kang-mo (Lee Beom-soo), Sung-mo (Park Sang-min), and Mi-joo (Hwang Jung-eum). One day, Kang-mo overheard that a group of dock workers wanted to entitle his father to rob the gold bars he transports. Kang-mo reported this to his father, Lee and his father reported to Jo Pil-yeon (Jeong Bo-seok), a KCIA official. However, Pil-yeon conspired with Hwang Tae-seob Lee Deok-hwa), Lee's best friend to rob the gold truck and killed Lee, which Tae-seob reluctantly agreed since he needed the money for his construction project. During the robbery, Tae-seob unable to bring himself to kill his best friend and told him to run with his family to Seoul but Pil-yeon killed Lee and Sung-Mo witnessed his father demise. To tie off loose end, Pil-yeon and his men decided to murder Sung-mo's entire family, forcing the family to be on the run. The mother of the siblings revealed that before their father died, he had bought a property in Seoul for them to stay. Sung-mo is separated during their escape to Seoul after he distracted Pil-yeon man in a train. He is then winded up in a US military base and becomes the choir boy. During a stay at the inn their mother dies in a heating accident. Kang-mo and Mi-joo was separated when they are in Seoul. Eventually, Kang-mo is forced to work as a shoeshine boy to make end meet and encountered Tae-seob by chance.

Kang-mo helps Hwang Tae-seob avoid bankruptcy by advocating the use of a different landfill material, which is coal ash. Out of gratitude, he is later adopted by Tae-seob. Meanwhile, Sung-mo made plan to earn Jo Pil-yeon's trust by spying on the US military development plan so Pil-yeon can make a huge fortune in real estate in the future so Sung-mo could destroy him in the future. A decade later. Kang-mo works as assistant to Tae-seob and Sung-mo becomes the right-hand man for Pil-yeon while Mi-joo becomes a caretaker for the wife of Chairman Hong, one of the prominent building contractors in Seoul. During a bidding of an important construction contract for a subway, Sung-mo sabotaged the bidding process, causing Chairman Hong to reveal a black book contains illegal funds of major building contractors and high-ranking officials. Pil-yeon and Tae-seob send Sung-mo and Kang-mo to retrieve the black book respectively, culminating of Sung-mo nearly kills his own brother without knowing it. Hong gives the black book to Mi-joo, which leads to Mi-joo and Kang-mo reunites after decades of separation. Sung-mo secretly helps Hong for his own plan of revenge causes him to finally reunite with his siblings to which he apologizes to them for failing to protect them. Sung-mo reveals the heart-breaking truth to Kang-mo that Tae-seob was responsible for their father's death. At the same time, Tae-seob's son accidentally kills Hong to retrieve the black book and frames Kang-mo for its. Kang-mo surrenders himself to the police while planning his revenge against Tae-seob. Tae-seob agrees to help Kang-mo for taking the blame for his son by giving the land in Gangnam to him. In prison, Kang-mo rises up to become the prison boss. After being released, Kang-mo establishes the Han River Construction company to compete with Manbo Corporation which Pil-yeon and Tae-seob control.

Eventually, Kang-mo succeed in making Manbo Corporation to lose a major contract in land development in Gangnam and manages to isolate Tae-seob allies in the construction association. Tae-seob begs Kang-mo to go back to work for him and even promises to let him and Jung-yeon to be together as husband and wife but he angrily refuses and reveals that Tae-seob owes him his father's life, shocking him. Out of guilt, Tae-seob decides to atone for his crime and transfers half of Manbo Corporation assets to Kang-mo as a token of redemption.

Mi-joo and Jo Pil-yeon's son, Min-woo, fall in love but cannot be allowed to be together because their families are enemies. Mi-joo becomes pregnant and goes into hiding, while Min-woo desperately searches for her. After foiling Tae-seob's stepwife and stepson from taking over his asset, Tae-seob asks Kang-mo for forgiveness and he accepts it, which Tae-seob reveals the location of his father's grave. While Kang-mo forgives Tae-seob, Sang-mo is not convinced. Mi-joo eventually gives birth to a son and becomes a singer. Min-woo discovers that Kang-mo and Mi-joo are sibling and shocks what his father did to Mi-joo's father, causing him to help Kang-mo in secret so he can be with Mi-joo and his son. Although Pil-yeon hates the fact that his grandson comes from his enemy, he still wishes to groom him to be his successor, replacing Min-woo. Pil-yean fakes the paternity test to fool Min-woo that Mi-joo's son is not his to manipulate him for his own ends. Eventually, Sang-mo creates a plan to take down Pil-yeon once and for all and plans to retire to open an orchid farm after the vengeance is fulfilled.

Later, Sung-mo baits Pil-yeon to spill out all his misdeeds and secretly recording it before escaping but is shot in the head by an agent of Jo Pil-yeon, rendering him mentally invalid. He is then hidden by a close friend in the intelligence agency. In the next 5 years, Jo Pil-yeon campaigns to become Prime Minister and he forces Min-woo to embezzle the funds of Manbo Corporation to acquire necessary bribes. Kang-mo and Mi-joo manage to locate Sung-mo along with the black account book and expose Pil-yeon as he is elected as Prime Minister. With undeniable proofs, Pil-yeon is forced to resign and goes into hiding. Min-woo is arrested for embezzlement and Manbo Corporation is acquired by Han River Construction. Mi-joo reveals the truth about his son, causing Min-woo to have had enough with his father and rats him out to the police, resulting in Pil-yeaon's arrest and life imprisonment. Sung-mo undergoes surgery to have the bullet taken out of his head, but he dies. He is buried alongside his father.

Many years later, Kang-mo has become South Korean most successful businessman and Mi-joo has become a famous singer. Min-woo is released from prison and attends her concert. Jo Pil-yeon breaks out of prison to try to murder Kang-mo, but he fails and commits suicide afterwards. The series ends with Kang-mo receiving word from his wife that his long-lost brother (a fourth sibling who was adopted by an American couple many years ago) has come to visit him.

== Cast ==
=== Main ===
- Lee Beom-soo as Lee Kang-mo, the middle brother in the family. He started out as a shoeshine boy but eventually becomes a real estate mogul as an adult.
  - Yeo Jin-goo as young Kang-mo
- Park Jin-hee as Hwang Jung-yeon
  - Nam Ji-hyun as young Jung-yeon
- Park Sang-min as Lee Sung-mo
  - Kim Soo-hyun as young Sung-mo
- Hwang Jung-eum as Lee Mi-joo
  - Park Ha-young as young Mi-joo
- Joo Sang-wook as Jo Min-woo
  - Noh Young-hak as young Min-woo
- Jeong Bo-seok as Jo Pil-yeon
- Lee Deok-hwa as Hwang Tae-seob
- Kim Seo-hyung as Yoo Kyung-ok
- Lee Moon-sik as Park So-tae
  - Seo Ji-won as young So-tae

=== Supporting ===
- Yoon Yoo-sun as Jung Young-sun, Kang-mo's mother
- Yoon Hyung-kwan as Yeom Jae-soo
- Shin Seung-hwan as Yeom Shi-deok
  - Jung Seung-won as young Shi-deok
- Choi Ha-na as Yeom Kyung-ja
- Han Kyung-sun as Lee Bok-ja
- Im Jong-yoon as Yoon Ki-hoon
- Moon Hee-kyung as Oh Nam-sook
- Kim Jung-hyun as Hwang Jung-shik
- Jang Soon-gook as Joo Young-gook
- Lee Seung-hyung as Moon Sung-joong
- Park No-shik as Park Choong-kwon
- Song Kyung-chul as Nam Young-chul
- Bang Kil-seung as drill instructor
- Hong Yeo-jin as Yang Myung-ja
- Yoon Yong-hyun as Go Jae-choon
- Hwang Taek-ha as Yoo Chan-sung
- Lee Hyo-jung as Han Myung-seok
- Kim Hak-chul as Oh Byung-tak
- Lee Ki-young as Min Hong-ki
- Im Hyuk as Baek Pa
- Jung Gyu-soo as Lee Dae-soo
- Son Byong-ho as Hong Ki-pyo
- Lee Eun-jung as Ji-na
- Jeon Jin-gi as detective lieutenant
- Kim Sung-oh as Cha Bu-chul
- Han Da-min as Cheon Soo-yeon
- Kim Eui-jin as Woo-joo
- Choi Gun-woo as Lee Joon-mo
  - Lee Won-il as young Joon-mo
- Lee Soo-jin as Nurse Kim
- Yoo Ho-rin as Ji Yeon-soo
- Kim Young-sun as Yoon Ki-hoon's wife
- Moon Ji-in as female employee at Manbo Construction
- Choi Min as gang boss
- Min Joon-hyun
- Kim Ga-eun
- Ji-yoo
- Qri as Bunny Girls (cameo)
- Park So-yeon as Bunny Girls (cameo)
- Shin Shin-ae as Inn's hostess (cameo)

== Ratings ==
Average TV viewership ratings
Ep.	Original broadcast date	Average audience share	
Ep.	Original broadcast date	Nielsen Korea	
Ep.	Original broadcast date	Nationwide	Seoul
1	May 10, 2010	10.0%	12.1%
2	May 10, 2010	13.5%	12.1%
3	May 11, 2010	11.6%	12.4%
4	May 17, 2010	11.0%	10.4%
5	May 18, 2010	13.3%	13.1%
6	May 24, 2010	13.9%	14.8%
7	May 25, 2010	14.7%	14.7%
8	May 31, 2010	14.8%	14.8%
9	June 1, 2010	15.4%	16.3%
10	June 7, 2010	13.8%	13.8%
11	June 8, 2010	14.9%	14.6%
12	June 22, 2010	12.4%	12.5%
13	June 28, 2010	12.8%	12.9%
14	June 29, 2010	14.4%	15.2%
15	July 5, 2010	14.3%	14.4%
16	July 6, 2010	14.8%	14.7%
17	July 12, 2010	16.4%	17.6%
18	July 13, 2010	18.2%	18.4%
19	July 19, 2010	16.4%	16.6%
20	July 20, 2010	18.9%	19.6%
21	July 26, 2010	17.4%	18.4%
22	July 27, 2010	19.1%	20.7%
23	August 2, 2010	19.2%	20.2%
24	August 3, 2010	20.7%	20.8%
25	August 9, 2010	21.4%	22.2%
26	August 10, 2010	22.9%	23.7%
27	August 16, 2010	22.4%	22.2%
28	August 17, 2010	24.9%	25.3%
29	August 23, 2010	22.4%	23.4%
30	August 24, 2010	21.0%	21.2%
31	August 30, 2010	20.9%	21.4%
32	August 31, 2010	22.2%	22.8%
33	September 6, 2010	22.6%	23.1%
34	September 7, 2010	24.2%	23.9%
35	September 13, 2010	23.6%	23.8%
36	September 14, 2010	24.2%	24.5%
37	September 20, 2010	20.6%	19.9%
38	September 21, 2010	17.6%	17.6%
39	September 27, 2010	22.3%	22.1%
40	September 28, 2010	23.1%	23.0%
41	October 4, 2010	22.5%	22.3%
42	October 5, 2010	24.7%	25.1%
43	October 11, 2010	27.9%	28.3%
44	October 12, 2010	24.0%	23.9%
45	October 18, 2010	28.9%	30.4%
46	October 19, 2010	28.5%	28.8%
47	October 25, 2010	28.1%	29.3%
48	October 26, 2010	29.2%	30.9%
49	November 1, 2010	28.0%	28.7%
50	November 2, 2010	29.8%	30.2%
51	November 8, 2010	29.5%	30.3%
52	November 9, 2010	29.7%	30.0%
53	November 15, 2010	29.2%	29.3%
54	November 16, 2010	29.7%	29.8%
55	November 22, 2010	30.7%	30.2%
56	November 23, 2010	29.1%	29.1%
57	November 29, 2010	31.4%	32.3%
58	November 30, 2010	32.7%	32.8%
59	December 6, 2010	32.7%	33.2%
60	December 7, 2010	38.2%	38.6%
Average		21.7%	22.0%
In the table above, the blue numbers represent the lowest ratings and the red numbers represent the highest ratings.

== Awards and nominations ==
Year	Award	Category	Recipient	Result	Ref.
2010	3rd Korea Drama Awards	Best Actor	Lee Beom-soo	Nominated	
2010	23rd Grimae Awards	Best Actress	Hwang Jung-eum	Won	
2010	SBS Drama Awards	Drama of the Year	Giant	Won	
2010	SBS Drama Awards	Top Excellence Award, Actor in a Special Planning Drama	Lee Beom-soo	Won	
2010	SBS Drama Awards	Top Excellence Award, Actor in a Special Planning Drama	Park Sang-min	Nominated	
2010	SBS Drama Awards	Excellence Award, Actor in a Special Planning Drama	Jeong Bo-seok	Won	
2010	SBS Drama Awards	Excellence Award, Actress in a Special Planning Drama	Park Jin-hee	Won	
2010	SBS Drama Awards	Best Supporting Actor in a Special Planning Drama	Lee Deok-hwa	Won	
2010	SBS Drama Awards	Best Supporting Actress in a Special Planning Drama	Hwang Jung-eum	Nominated	
2010	SBS Drama Awards	Best Supporting Actress in a Special Planning Drama	Kim Seo-hyung	Nominated	
2010	SBS Drama Awards	PD Award	Park Sang-min	Won	
2010	SBS Drama Awards	Top 10 Stars	Jeong Bo-seok	Won	
2010	SBS Drama Awards	Top 10 Stars	Lee Beom-soo	Won	
2010	SBS Drama Awards	Top 10 Stars	Park Jin-hee	Won	
2010	SBS Drama Awards	New Star Award	Hwang Jung-eum	Won	
2010	SBS Drama Awards	New Star Award	Joo Sang-wook	Won	
2010	SBS Drama Awards	New Star Award	Kim Soo-hyun	Won	
2010	SBS Drama Awards	Best Couple Award	Joo Sang-wook and Hwang Jung-eum	Won	
2010	DramaBeans Awards	Favourite Drama of 2010	Giant	Nominated	
2011	2nd Seoul Art and Culture Awards	Best TV Actor	Lee Beom-soo	Won	
2011	47th Baeksang Arts Awards	Best Drama	Giant	Nominated	
2011	47th Baeksang Arts Awards	Best Actor (TV)	Lee Beom-soo	Nominated	
2011	47th Baeksang Arts Awards	Best Actor (TV)	Jeong Bo-seok	Won	
2011	47th Baeksang Arts Awards	Best Director (TV)	Yoo In-shik	Nominated	
2011	47th Baeksang Arts Awards	Best Screenplay (TV)	Jang Young-chul, Jung Kyung-soon	Nominated	
2011	47th Baeksang Arts Awards	Male Popularity Award – TV	Lee Beom-soo	Nominated	
2011	47th Baeksang Arts Awards	Male Popularity Award – TV	Jeong Bo-seok	Nominated	
2011	47th Baeksang Arts Awards	Male Popularity Award – TV	Joo Sang-wook	Nominated	
2011	47th Baeksang Arts Awards	Female Popularity Award – TV	Hwang Jung-eum	Nominated	
2011	4th Korea Drama Awards	Best Actor	Lee Beom-soo	Nominated	
2011	4th Korea Drama Awards	Best Supporting Actor	Joo Sang-wook	Won	
2011	4th Korea Drama Awards	Best Supporting Actor	Kim Sung-oh	Nominated	
2011	38th Korea Broadcasting Awards	Best Full-length Drama	Giant	Won	
2011	38th Korea Broadcasting Awards	Best Writer(s)	Jang Young-chul, Jung Kyung-soon	Won	
