= Jeong Bo-seok =

South Korean actor

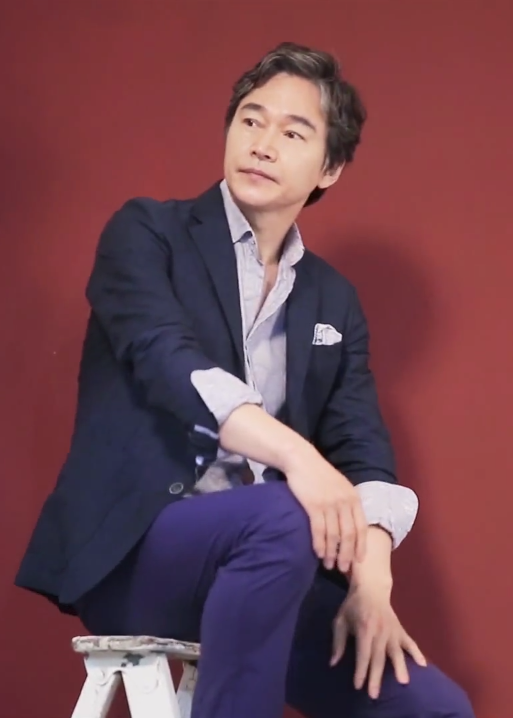
- Jeong in 2015
- Born: June 14, 1961 (age 65); Naju, South Jeolla Province, South Korea
- Other name: Jung Bo-suk
- Education: Chung-Ang University
- Occupation: Actor
- Years active: 1986–present
- Agent: Zenith Media Contents
- Spouse: Ki Min-jung

Korean name
- Hangul: 정보석
- Hanja: 鄭普錫
- RR: Jeong Boseok
- MR: Chŏng Posŏk
- Website: at Zenith Media Contents

Jeong Bo-seok (Korean: 정보석; born 1961) is a South Korean actor.

== Filmography ==
=== Television series ===
Year	Title	Role	Notes
1986	The Battle of White Horse		
1986	TV Literature	Ji-soo	Episode "Young Zelkova Tree"
1987	Samogok	Dal-seo	
1988	Sunshim-yi		
1988	O, Heaven	Crown Prince Sado	
1989	Mt. Jiri	Yoo Tae-rim	
1992	My Beloved	Lee Dong-chul	
1993	Stormy Season	Byung-wook	
1993	Ladies' Man	Kang Chan-woo	
1994	Ambition	Hong Jin-ho	
1994	My Son's Woman	Kang Tae-wook	
1995	Love and Marriage	Kim Seon-woo	
1995	Dazzling Dawn	Kim Ok-kyun	
1996	Salted Mackerel		
1996	Crime Squad	Woo-chan	
1997	MBC Best Theater	Jin-ho	Episode "Trap"
1997	The Third Man	Jang Jae-min	
1997	Tears of Roses	Ki-beom	
1998	Love	Sung-soo	
1998	See and See Again	Ki-jung	
1999	You	Kim Dong-hee	
1999	You're One-of-a-Kind		
1999	Promise	Park Seung-hyuk	
2000	More Than Words Can Say	Kang Jang-soo	
2000	Daddy Fish	Jung Ho-yeon	
2001	Girls' High School	Jeong Bo-seok	
2001	Soon-ja	Min Hyuk-joo	
2001	Life Is Beautiful	Oh Choon-gu	
2001	The Merchant	Jung Chi-soo	
2002	Miss Mermaid	Ma Ma-joon	
2003	Wife	Nam Hyun-pil	
2003	Pretty Woman	Jang Dae-woong	
2003	She Is Cool	Bae Jin-chul	
2004	The Count of Myeongdong	Narrator	
2004	Forgiveness	Kim Hyung-woo	
2005	The Conker Tree	Narrator	
2005	Shin Don	King Gongmin	
2006	Drama City	Kwon	Episode "The Trunk"
2006	I'll Go With You	Hyun-soo	
2006	Dae Jo-yeong	Li Kaigu	
2008	Bitter Sweet Life	Ha Dong-won	
2009	Kyung-sook, Kyung-sook's Father	Jo Jae-soo	
2009	High Kick Through the Roof	Jeong Bo-seok	
2010	Giant	Jo Pil-yeon	
2010	Stormy Lovers	Yoo Dae-kwon	
2011	Listen to My Heart	Bong Young-kyu	
2012	History of a Salaryman	Congressman Jo Pil-yeon	Cameo, episode 6
2012	High Kick: Revenge of the Short Legged	Jeong Bo-seok	Cameo, episode 84
2012	God of War	Choe Woo	
2012	Arang and the Magistrate	Eun-oh's teacher	Cameo, episode 14
2012	Ugly Cake	Han Moon-gil	
2013	A Hundred Year Legacy	Min Hyo-dong	
2013	Goddess of Fire	King Seonjo	
2014	Golden Cross	Seo Dong-ha	
2014	Rosy Lovers	Baek Man-jong	
2014	Naeil's Cantabile	Cha Dong-woo	
2015	A Daughter Just Like You	So Pan-seok	
2016	Monster	Byun Il-Jae	
2017	The King in Love	King Chungryul	
2017	Mad Dog	Cha Joon-kyu	
2018	The Rich Son	Kim Won-yong	
2018	Heart Surgeons	Yoon Hyun-il	
2020	Dr. Romantic 2	Bae Moon-jeong’s father	Cameo, episode 15-16
2020–2021	Homemade Love Story	Woo Jung-hoo	
2021	Secret Royal Inspector & Joy	Park Seung	
2022-2023	Red Balloon	Jo Dae-Bong	
2023	Strong Girl Nam-soon	Seo Jun-Hee	
2024	Who Is She	Park Gap-Yong	

=== Film ===
Year	Title	Role
1989	Long After That	Yoon Jin-woo
1990	KokchiTtan	Young-seok
1990	The Dream	Mo-rae
1991	Portrait of the Days of Youth	Lee Young-hoon
1991	For Agnes	Park Seung-ho
1991	Tears of Seoul	
1991	The Fifth Man	Chang
1992	Stairway to Heaven	Kim Ho-seong (cameo)
1992	Walking All the Way to Heaven	Mul-sae
1993	Western Avenue	
1994	Man of 49 Days	J
1995	Mugunghwa (Korean National Flower)	Sun-beom
1995	A Hot Roof	Maneuver general
2000	A Story About Her	
2000	Virgin Stripped Bare by Her Bachelors	Jae-hoon
2002	Three	Husband (segment: "Memories")
2004	Everybody Has Secrets	Professor Uhm
2004	Don't Tell Papa	Customer at the cafe
2005	My Right to Ravage Myself	S
2007	Driving with My Wife's Lover	Joong-sik
2010	Oceans	Korean dubbed narration

=== Television shows ===
Year	Title	Notes/Ref.
1994	Cinema Music Room with Jeong Bo-seok	DJ
2011	The Land of Gods, Angkor (3D Documentary)	Narration
2011	Cheongdam-dong, City at Dawn with Jeong Bo-seok	Host
2012	Jewelry House	Host
2021	Family from today	Host
2022	Walking through the Village - Jeong Bo Seok's Island Village Story	Host
2022	Untangodo Village Hotel	Responsible for hotel

== Theater ==
Year	Title	Role
1990	The Elephant Man	
2008	Closer	
2008	Art	
2009	A Family On the Road	Lee Jung-seob
2009–2010	The Wedding Day	
2011	Dandelions in the Wind	Ahn Joong-ki/Husband
2011	Goethe's Faust	Heinrich Faust
2012	Ruin	Kim's father
2013	Hamlet	Hamlet
2015	Red	Mark Rothko
2022–2023	Red	Mark Rothko

== Awards and nominations ==
Year	Award	Category	Nominated work	Result
1987	KBS Drama Awards	Best New Actor	Samogok	Won
1988	24th Baeksang Arts Awards	Best New Actor (TV)	Samogok	Nominated
1988	KBS Excellence in Programming Awards	Excellence Award, Actor	O, Heaven	Won
1990	28th Grand Bell Awards	Best New Actor	Long After That	Nominated
1990	11th Blue Dragon Film Awards	Best Supporting Actor	The Dream	Nominated
1991	29th Grand Bell Awards	Best Actor	Portrait of the Days of Youth	Nominated
1991	12th Blue Dragon Film Awards	Best Actor	Portrait of the Days of Youth	Nominated
1992	30th Grand Bell Awards	Best Actor	Walking All the Way to Heaven	Nominated
1993	29th Baeksang Arts Awards	Best Actor (Film)	Walking All the Way to Heaven	Nominated
1993	31st Grand Bell Awards	Best Actor	Western Avenue	Nominated
1995	16th Blue Dragon Film Awards	Best Supporting Actor	A Hot Roof	Nominated
1995	MBC Drama Awards	Top Excellence Award, Actor	My Son's Woman	Won
1998	MBC Drama Awards	Best Couple Award (with Kim Ji-soo)	See and See Again	Won
2000	KBS Drama Awards	Top Excellence Award, Actor	More Than Words Can Say	Nominated
2002	MBC Drama Awards	Excellence Award, Actor in a Serial Drama	The Merchant, Miss Mermaid	Nominated
2006	KBS Drama Awards	Excellence Award, Actor in a One-Act/Special/Short Drama	The Trunk	Nominated
2007	KBS Drama Awards	Excellence Award, Actor in a Serial Drama	Dae Jo-yeong	Nominated
2007	KBS Drama Awards	Popularity Award, Actor	Dae Jo-yeong	Won
2008	16th Korean Culture and Entertainment Awards	Grand Prize (Daesang) for TV	Bitter Sweet Life	Won
2008	16th Korean Culture and Entertainment Awards	Top Excellence Award, Actor in a Drama	Bitter Sweet Life	Won
2009	MBC Entertainment Awards	Top Excellence Award, Actor in a Sitcom/Comedy	High Kick Through the Roof	Won
2009	KBS Drama Awards	Excellence Award, Actor in a One-Act/Special/Short Drama	Kyung-sook, Kyung-sook's Father	Nominated
2010	SBS Drama Awards	Excellence Award, Actor in a Special Planning Drama	Giant	Won
2010	SBS Drama Awards	Top 10 Stars	Giant	Won
2011	47th Baeksang Arts Awards	Best Actor (TV)	Giant	Won
2011	7th Golden Ticket Awards	Best Actor in a Play	Dandelions in the Wind	Won
2011	MBC Drama Awards	Golden Acting Award, Actor in a Miniseries	Listen to My Heart, Stormy Lovers	Won
2012	MBC Drama Awards	Top Excellence Award, Actor in a Serial Drama	God of War	Nominated
2013	MBC Drama Awards	Golden Acting Award, Actor	A Hundred Year Legacy	Won
2015	MBC Drama Awards	Top Excellence Award, Actor in a Serial Drama	A Daughter Just Like You	Nominated
2016	MBC Drama Awards	Golden Acting Award, Actor in a Special Project Drama	Monster	Nominated
2017	MBC Drama Awards	Golden Acting Award, Actor in a Special Project Drama	The King in Love	Won
2018	MBC Drama Awards	Top Excellence Award, Actor in a Soap Opera	The Rich Son	Nominated
2020	KBS Drama Awards	Top Excellence Award, Actor	Homemade Love Story	Won
2020	KBS Drama Awards	Excellence Award, Actor in a Serial Drama	Homemade Love Story	Nominated
2020	KBS Drama Awards	Best Couple Award with Lee Jang-woo and Jin Ki-joo	Homemade Love Story	Won
