= The Wonderfools =

2026 South Korean television series

- Promotional poster
- Hangul: 원더풀스
- RR: Wondeopulseu
- MR: Wŏndŏp'ulsŭ
- Genre: Superhero; Comedy; Action adventure
- Created by: Kang Eun-kyung
- Written by: Heo Da-joong
- Directed by: Yoo In-shik
- Starring: Park Eun-bin; Cha Eun-woo; Choi Dae-hoon; Im Seong-jae; Kim Hae-sook; Son Hyun-joo
- Music by: Kim Tae-seung
- Opening theme: "The Wonderfools" by Choe Jeong-in
- Country of origin: South Korea
- Original language: Korean
- No. of episodes: 8

Production
- Executive producers: Lee Sang-min; Jang Se-jung; Namkoong Jung; Go Eun-ho; Lee Jae-hwan; Kim Min-ji
- Producers: Bae Sun-hye; Kim Deok-jin
- Cinematography: Hwang Min-sik; Park Min-hyun
- Editor: Cho In-hyung
- Running time: 60–92 minutes
- Production companies: Nangmancrew; Kakao Entertainment; Fantagio

Original release
- Network: Netflix
- Release: May 15, 2026

The Wonderfools (Korean: 원더풀스) is a 2026 South Korean superhero comedy action adventure television series created by Kang Eun-kyung, written by Heo Da-joong, directed by Yoo In-shik, and starring Park Eun-bin, Cha Eun-woo, Kim Hae-sook, Choi Dae-hoon, Im Seong-jae, and Son Hyun-joo. The series focuses on the experiences of "flawed superhumans", who are unable to control their abilities and end up using them unintentionally.

The series entered development as early as 2018 under the working title The B-Team and was originally conceived as an adaptation of an original story idea by Stan Lee, before transitioning into a completely new original story. Co-produced by Kakao Entertainment and Fantagio, principal photography took place from October 2024 to May 2025. It was released globally on Netflix on May 15, 2026.

The Wonderfools received generally positive reviews for its warm-hearted humanism, late-1990s nostalgia, and cast performances. Commercially, the series debuted at number six on Netflix's Global Top 10 Non-English Shows chart after three days of tracking and ranked eighth among Nielsen's most-watched streaming originals in the United States during its first full week of availability, becoming the only non-English-language series in the Top 10.

== Plot ==
In late 1999, as the impending arrival of the new millennium fuels widespread Y2K panic and apocalyptic doom-mongering, the fictional city of Haeseong becomes the epicenter of an unusual supernatural phenomenon. The city is home to a trio of social outcasts: Eun Chae-ni, a cynical, hot-tempered 27-year-old suffering from a severe congenital heart condition that leaves her facing sudden death; Son Gyeong-hun, a notorious public nuisance who constantly files petty civil complaints at city hall; and Kang Ro-bin, an overly timid man frequently treated as a neighborhood pushover.

Desperate to travel the world before her illness claims her life, Chae-ni concocts a hare-brained scheme to stage her own kidnapping alongside Gyeong-hun and Ro-bin in order to extort ransom money from her wealthy, overprotective grandmother, Kim Jeon-bok. However, the plan goes disastrously wrong when Chae-ni suddenly suffers a fatal heart attack. Panic-stricken, Gyeong-hun and Ro-bin attempt to dispose of her body near a local facility, unaware that illegal, toxic wastewater is leaking from a hidden laboratory. Exposure to the chemical waste unexpectedly resurrects Chae-ni and grants all three misfits erratic, uncontrollable superpowers. Chae-ni acquires the ability to teleport whenever her heart rate spikes; Kyung-hoon is able to stick to surfaces whenever he tells a lie; and Ro-bin is endowed with superhuman strength that is unleashed only when something upsets him.

The entire incident is witnessed by Lee Un-jeong, a socially awkward, rigidly rule-oriented civil servant recently transferred to Haeseong City Hall from Seoul. Known by colleagues as an oddball, Un-jeong secretly possesses powerful telekinetic abilities. Recognizing his prowess, the newly empowered trio dubs him their "master" and pressures him into training them to control their unstable gifts. Un-jeong, who reluctantly complies, harbours his own dark secrets tied to a closed orphanage that once stood on the grounds now occupied by a fanatical doomsday cult, the Church of Eternal Salvation.

The source of the toxic pollutants is eventually traced back to the Wunderkinder Project, a brutal, covert human-experimentation program run by the ruthless scientist Dr. Ha Won-do. Decades prior, Won-do had subjected orphaned children to agonizing biological experiments in a bid to awaken superhuman abilities and discover the secret to eternal life. Having weaponized the surviving test subjects, Won-do returns to Haeseong City to track down a mythical "Child of Eternity" whose unique biology holds the key to a definitive cure for the side effects plaguing the survivors.

As Won-do's trio of altered enforcers, Kim Pal-ho, Seok Ju-ran, and Seok Ho-ran begin terrorizing the city and staging abductions, the bickering "Team Wonderfools" is thrust into the center of a conspiracy. Despite their lack of superhero competence and personal struggles—including Gyeong-hun's attempts to reconcile with his estranged family and Chae-ni's coming to terms with her past medical history—the team must learn to sync their abilities. The citizens unite under Un-jeong's guidance to protect their neighborhood and stop Won-do's plans before the dawn of the new millennium.

== Cast and characters ==
=== Main ===
- Park Eun-bin as Eun Chae-ni
  - Kim Si-on as young Chae-ni

A resident who is known as the trainwreck of Haeseong City with a terminal heart condition who attempts to fake her own kidnapping to obtain travel money from her grandmother. After the plan results in her temporary death, she is resurrected and gains the ability to teleport whenever her heart rate spikes, eventually leading her to defend her hometown.

- Cha Eun-woo as Lee Un-jeong
  - Han Ji-an as the young Un-jeong

A reserved and rule-abiding civil servant who secretly possesses telekinetic abilities. While operating alone to find a person from his past and locate his birth mother, his plans are disrupted when he is forced to guide Chae-ni and her friends in mastering their newly acquired powers.

- Choi Dae-hoon as Son Gyeong-hun

A chronic complainant at Haeseong City Hall Complaints Center who frequently files grievances regarding toxic runoff from a local dump site. He agrees to assist Chae-ni with her fake kidnapping scheme for a share of the money, but exposure to the chemical waste grants him the ability to stick to surfaces whenever he tells a lie, which only releases once he speaks the truth.

- Im Seong-jae as Kang Ro-bin

A timid kitchen employee at Hearty House and Chae-ni's friend who acts as an accomplice in her fake kidnapping scheme. Following the incident, he develops superhuman strength and a degree of invulnerability that is triggered primarily when he feels insulted or hears profanity.

- Kim Hae-sook as Kim Jeon-bok

Chae-ni's grandmother and the owner of Hearty House who secretly possesses significant financial influence. She was a former financier of Won-do's covert research laboratory and maintains a watchful eye over the facility's surviving test subjects.

- Son Hyun-joo as Dr. Ha Won-do

A scientist who returns to Haeseong-si after serving a 20-year prison sentence for running the "Wunderkinder Project", a covert human-experimentation program that granted children superhuman abilities. Upon his release, he reunites with his surviving test subjects to locate a former patient whose unique biology he believes holds the key to discovering eternal life.

=== Supporting ===
- Bae Na-ra as Kim Pal-ho
  - Shin Tae-yang as young Pal-ho

A Wunderkinder who works closely with Won-do and has the ability to manipulate gravity.

- Jung Yi-seo as Seok Ju-ran
  - Oh Ji-yul as young Ju-ran

A Wunderkinder who views Won-do as a father figure and has the ability of brainwashing through telepathy.

- Choi Yoon-ji as Seok Ho-ran
  - Choi So-yul as young Ho-ran

A Wunderkinder who has the ability to telepathically induce hallucinations.

- Cha Seo-won as Gu Jun-mo
  - Jang Jae-ha as young Jun-mo

A survivor of the Wunderkinder Project who lives a normal life thanks to Jeon-bok.

- Kim Ki-cheon as Go Sang-moo

A former caretaker of kids for Wunderkinder Project.

- Kang Ki-doong as Yang Seok-u

A senior civil servant at Haeseong City Hall Complaints Center.

- Lee Soo-bin as Kim Na-yeong

a junior civil servant at Haeseong City Hall Complaints Center.

- Jung Yeon as Moon Mi-hui

Gyeong-hun's wife who runs a flower shop in Haeseong City.

- Park Ye-rin as Son Cheong

Gyeong-hun's daughter.

- Choi Gwang-il as Choi Yeong-jun

The former director of Wunderkinder Project.

- Seo Woo-jin as the Child of Eternity
- Park Sung-geun as Elder Yoon

One of the elders of the Church of Eternal Salvation.

- Hwang Eun-hoo as a church woman
- Lee Sae-ro-mi as Ha-na

An employee at Hearty House.

- Jin Tae-yeon as Du-na

An employee at Hearty House.

- Jin Mi-sa as Won-ju

An employee at Hearty House.

- Hong Min-soo as Kim Bong-pal

=== Special appearances ===
- Hur Jung-do as Kwon Jun-bae, (Note: Hur Jung-do's character name, Kwon Jun-bae, is seen on the white coat he wears but his role is credited as an "attending physician" at the first episode of the series.) a doctor
- Byun Woo-min as a loyal subject
- Jeong Bo-seok as Nam Sun-gyu
- Jung Ji-an as Nurse Eom
- Jung Young-joo as Aurora madam
- Lee Il-hwa as Un-jeong's mother
- Lee Yong-yi as a cursing grandmother
- Lee Juck as a radio DJ

== Episodes ==
No.	Title	Original release date
1	"Every Life Comes With a Surprise Twist"; Transliteration: "Nuguui insaengena banjeoneun itda" (Korean: 누구의 인생에나 반전은 있다)	May 15, 2026
2	"Secrets Are Meant to Be Kept"; Transliteration: "Malhal su eopseonikka bimiriji" (Korean: 말할 수 없으니까 비밀이지)	May 15, 2026
3	"Brutes and Bad Luck Do Come in Droves"; Transliteration: "Kkangpaewa buruneun kkok mollyeodaniji" (Korean: 깡패와 불운은 꼭 몰려다니지)	May 15, 2026
4	"Boon the King Duck vs Wunderkinder"; Transliteration: "Bundang Keundak vs Wunder Kinder" (Korean: 분당 큰닭 vs Wunder Kinder)	May 15, 2026
5	"All We Need Is You"; Transliteration: "Neo hanamyeon dwae" (Korean: 너 하나면 돼)	May 15, 2026
6	"All Roads Lead to Chae-ni"; Transliteration: "Modeun giren Chaeniro tonghanda" (Korean: 모든 길은 채니로 통한다)	May 15, 2026
7	"The Guardians of Haeseong City Part 1"; Transliteration: "Gadieonjeu obeu Haeseongsi part1" (Korean: 가디언즈 오브 해성시 part1)	May 15, 2026
8	"The Guardians of Haeseong City Part 2"; Transliteration: "Gadieonjeu obeu Haeseong-si part2" (Korean: 가디언즈 오브 해성시 part2)	May 15, 2026

== Production ==
=== Development ===
In November 2018, the superhero drama series was initially based on Stan Lee's IP work titled The B-Team and is about a fight between B-rated superheroes and a mad scientist who created them. Lee's production company POW! Entertainment participated in the early stages of planning and development for the series, which was then being produced by Studio Invictus and JYP Pictures. Later in 2024, as the full-scale production began, the series would be developed as an original by the production company without the original work. Regarding this, the series' new production company Nangmancrew stated, "This is something that was agreed upon with the original author. The title would also be changed."

In December 2020, SBS held the "2021 SBS Showcase" introducing their drama, entertainment, and educational lineup for 2021 through its official YouTube channel and announced that it would launch the drama The B-Team, which was supposed to air on SBS TV in 2021. PD Yoo In-sik, who directed Giant (2010), Dr. Romantic series (2016–2023), and Vagabond (2019), helmed the megaphone, screenwriter Kang Eun-kyung, who is best known for writing Bread, Love and Dreams (2010), Dr. Romantic series (2016–2023), and Gyeongseong Creature series (2023–2024), participated as the creator, and Heo Da-joong, who is one of the writers of Extreme Job (2019), penned the script. Nangmancrew, Kakao Entertainment, and Fantagio would managed the production.

=== Casting ===
Park Eun-bin and Cha Eun-woo were reportedly cast as the lead actors of the series in April and July 2024, respectively. Park and Cha's appearances were confirmed to appear along with Kim Hae-sook, Choi Dae-hoon, Im Seong-jae, and Son Hyun-joo in November 2024. Bae Na-ra joined the cast in June 2025.

=== Filming ===
Principal photography began in October 2024 and wrapped up in June 2025.

The series made extensive use of coastal locations across South Korea, particularly for scenes featuring Eun Chae-ni's teleportation ability. Notable filming sites highlighted by the Ministry of Oceans and Fisheries include Sam-bong Beach in Taean (where Chae-ni and Lee Un-jeong teleport together), Gyeongpo Beach in Gangneung, Homi Cape Sunrise Square in Pohang, Geunpo Village in Geoje, as well as seafood markets in Ulleungdo and Pohang's Jukdo Market.

== Release ==
Netflix announced their confirmed 2025 Korean content lineup and The Wonderfools was not included. Netflix later confirmed that the series was scheduled for a second quarter of 2026 release. In February 2026, a premiere date of May 15 was reported by My Daily, but Netflix initially responded that the date was not finalized. By April 2026, Netflix officially confirmed that the series is set to be released on May 15, 2026, and released the official trailer and poster.

== Reception ==
=== Viewership ===
The Wonderfools debuted at number 6 on Netflix's Global Top 10 Non-English Shows weekly chart. In its first three days (May 15–17, 2026), it recorded 2.7 million views (25.3 million hours viewed) and entered the Top 10 in 25 countries. The series rose to number 2 in its second week with 7.9 million views, reaching the Top 10 in 64 countries. It remained at number 2 in its third week. By its fourth week it had reached a cumulative 16.8 million views (158.6 million hours viewed). In its fifth week (June 8–14, 2026) it placed eighth, bringing the total to 18.1 million views and 170.8 million hours watched globally.

According to Nielsen streaming ratings, the series recorded 339 million minutes viewed in the United States during its first full week of availability (May 18–24, 2026), ranking eighth among the most-watched streaming originals that week and becoming the only non-English-language series in the Top 10. Parrot Analytics data reported by ContentAsia showed the series ranking ninth among digital originals in the Philippines (18.4 times the market average) during the week of 25–31 May 2026.

In Netflix's official What We Watched report for the first half of 2026, The Wonderfools accumulated 188.4 million hours viewed and 20 million views. It ranked 50th globally and 5th among Korean series (by views).

=== Critical response ===
Professional ratings
Aggregate scores
Source	Rating
Rotten Tomatoes	100%
Review scores
Source	Rating
Midgard Times	9.5/10
Screen Rant	9/10
But Why Tho?	8.5/10
Digital Mafia Talkies	5/5 stars
IDN Times	4.5/5 stars
Cine21	3/4 stars
iMBC	3/4 stars
India Today	3.5/5 stars
South China Morning Post	3/5 stars

The Wonderfools received generally positive reviews from both domestic and international critics upon its release. On the review aggregator website Rotten Tomatoes, 100% of 6 critics' reviews are positive, with an average rating of 8.6/10. Reviewers frequently praised the series for its warm-hearted humanism, late-1990s nostalgia, and the strong chemistry of its ensemble cast, though opinions were divided regarding its early pacing and rapid tonal shifts. Writing for Decider, Joel Keller gave the series a "Stream It" recommendation, calling it a fun and funny show about reluctant superheroes despite the slow-burning first episode. But Why Tho? awarded the series an 8.5 out of 10, summarizing it as "so darn delightful" because it never takes itself too seriously. Variety India described it as "immensely watchable" despite a few flaws, highlighting its breezy, action-packed and comedy-filled nature as perfect light-hearted entertainment. Screen Rant awarded the series a 9/10, stating that it "breathes new life into the superhero genre" thanks to its instantly lovable and colorful characters, strong emphasis on personal growth, interconnected storylines, and efficient eight-episode structure.

The series' narrative themes and direction were a primary focus of praise. OSEN highlighted that beneath its superhero premise, the show effectively depicts the growth of its main characters into a family-like team, allowing them to recover their self-esteem after previously being viewed as societal nuisances. Cine21 gave the series 3 out of 4 stars, describing it as "the birth of a K-hero series that can work in the global market", praising its mature industrial execution, the distinctive sense of space set in late-20th-century Korea, the combination of likable clumsy characters, and the effective humor that arises when extraordinary powers collide with everyday reality. TV Daily and the South China Morning Post echoed this sentiment, noting that the show delivers a deep sense of humanism and "fitfully entertaining fluff" by contrasting the bleak, apocalyptic anxieties of the late-20th-century Y2K panic with the pure-hearted solidarity of ordinary citizens fighting to protect their neighborhood. Journalist Kim Ji-hyun of TV Daily particularly praised rookie screenwriter Heo Da-joong, noting her excellent story structure and her ability to write perfectly timed humorous dialogues. Hankook Ilbo described the series as a "Korean version of Guardians of the Galaxy", praising its charm in placing flawed, minor characters — deeply rooted in Korean social realities — inside a popular superhero framework, creating unpredictable developments filled with B-grade humor and warm humanism. iMBC awarded the series 3 out of 4 stars, describing it as a warm story that comfortably embraces human flaws through the solidarity of its quirky characters. Director Yoo In-sik was also lauded for his direction; Ilgan Sports praised his rhythmic action sequences, particularly a long, one-take rescue scene, while IDN Times praised the distinct mise-en-scène, highlighting the fast camera movements, sudden close-ups, and whimsical sound design that enhanced the multi-layered comedic scenes. Digital Mafia Talkies compared the series favorably to Western sci-fi and superhero properties like Stranger Things and The Boys, writing that it avoided the narrative bloat of later seasons of those shows by prioritizing intimate character development over convoluted plotting. They also commended the grounded, impactful weight of the stunt work and superhero action, comparing its execution to early-2000s films like Hancock, Push, Chronicle, and Jumper. Screen Rant praised "The Wunderkinder" as effective and sympathetic antagonists who serve as a dark mirror to the main quartet, with tragic backstories intrinsically linked to Chae-ni and Un-jeong. The review also highlighted the strong visualization of the powers and action sequences, noting that characterization and emotion are never sacrificed for spectacle.

The performances of the cast received widespread acclaim. Park Eun-bin's performance was highlighted as the anchor of the series. Korean critics singled out her versatility, with Ilgan Sports terming her portrayal an "overwhelming one-woman show" that seamlessly navigated sudden shifts between comedy, action, and dramatic depth, while Hankook Ilbo commended her energetic and commanding screen presence. This sentiment was echoed by international outlets; the South China Morning Post highlighted her bold willingness to embrace an eccentric, unconventional comic style, and Digital Mafia Talkies praised her "Chaplin-esque" physical comedy and expressive range. Furthermore, India Today noted that Park successfully imbued her high-energy character with a distinct vulnerability, preventing the performance from becoming exhausting.

Cha Eun-woo's performance was praised as a mature step forward, groundedly sustaining the show's tonal balance. While pre-screening journalists and Korean critics from Delighti and Next Daily highlighted his restrained emotional range, stable breath control, and subtle micro-expressions to convey inner tension, reviewers from India Today and But Why Tho? commended his dry humor and effectiveness as the story's "straight man". Furthermore, Tatiana Hullender of Screen Rant noted that Cha successfully surprised audiences by portraying the character's morally ambiguous motivations with genuine emotional depth, while maintaining the narrative's central romantic aspects. Additionally, ITBizNews praised Cha's compelling screen presence, noting that his performance and dynamic with Park complemented the series' rapid rise to No. 1 on Netflix's "Now Trending" chart shortly after its release.

The comedic contributions of Choi Dae-hoon and Im Seong-jae were praised. The Fact and Hankook Ilbo noted that while the script's dialogue could have felt juvenile on paper, Choi and Im elevated the material through their natural ad-libs and realistic comedic timing, effectively serving as highlights of the series. Western outlets, such as Screen Rant and Midgard Times, concurred, commending the supporting cast for bringing an engaging energy and a compelling combination of humor and pathos to their respective roles.

While the series received generally positive reviews, some reviewers noted issues with the pacing, narrative structure, and tonal shifts. International outlets such as India Today and the South China Morning Post pointed out that the series sometimes shifts abruptly from slapstick comedy to heavier themes like childhood trauma, which occasionally made the tone feel uneven. Korean critics at OSEN and iMBC found the early episodes slow due to extensive exposition, while TV Daily and JoyNews24 felt that tension dropped in the later episodes. In contrast, Tatiana Hullender of Screen Rant praised the structure, writing that the series effectively balanced multiple plotlines and delivered a satisfying conclusion without narrative bloat.

=== Accolades ===
Name of the award ceremony, year presented, category, nominee of the award, and the result of the nomination
Award ceremony	Year	Category	Nominee	Result	Ref.
Asian Academy Creative Awards	2026	Best Visual or Special FX in TV Series or Feature Film (National Winners – Korea)	The Wonderfools	Won	
Blue Dragon Series Awards	2026	Best Drama	The Wonderfools	Longlisted	
Blue Dragon Series Awards	2026	Best Director	Yoo In-shik	Longlisted	
Blue Dragon Series Awards	2026	Best Actor	Cha Eun-woo	Longlisted	
Blue Dragon Series Awards	2026	Best Actress	Park Eun-bin	Longlisted	
Blue Dragon Series Awards	2026	Best Supporting Actor	Choi Dae-hoon	Longlisted	
Blue Dragon Series Awards	2026	Best Supporting Actor	Im Seong-jae	Longlisted	
Blue Dragon Series Awards	2026	OST Popularity Award	"Flip My World"	Nominated	
Blue Dragon Ranking Awards (Note: The Blue Dragon Ranking is a popularity award hosted by Sports Chosun, the organizer of the Blue Dragon Film Awards and Blue Dragon Series Awards. It recognizes trend-setting actors by presenting semiannual awards for Best Actor and Best Actress.)	2026	Best Actor (Note: First Half of 2026.)	Cha Eun-woo	Won	
Brand of the Year Awards (Note: Established in 2003, the Brand of the Year Awards is an awards ceremony based on nationwide surveys hosted by the Korea Consumer Brand Committee and organized by the Korea Consumer Forum.)	2026	Drama of the Year (Vietnam)	The Wonderfools	Nominated	
iMBC Awards (Note: iMBC Awards, hosted by iMBC Entertainment, MBC Group's only entertainment news outlet, honors artists and actors with outstanding achievements in the industry.)	2026	Best Actor	Cha Eun-woo	Nominated	
iMBC Awards	2026	Best Actress	Park Eun-bin	Nominated	
Seoul International Drama Awards	2026	Outstanding Asian Star (Female)	Park Eun-bin	Nominated	
Seoul International Drama Awards	2026	Outstanding Asian Star (Male)	Cha Eun-woo	Nominated	

=== Listicles ===
Publisher	Year	Listicle	Placement	Ref.
Joy News 24	2026	Best Drama of the Year	Included	
