= Shin Ae-ra =

South Korean actress (born 1969)

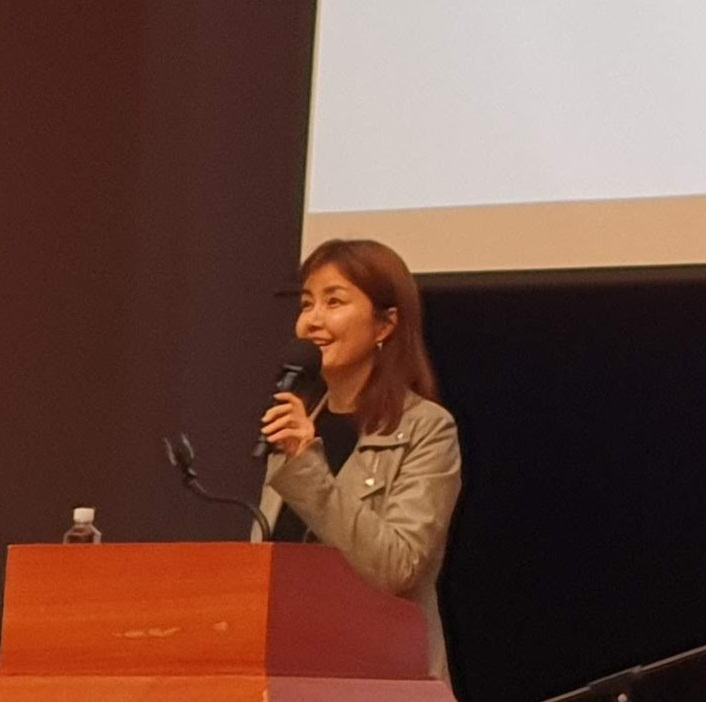
- Shin in 2023
- Born: March 7, 1969 (age 57); Seoul, South Korea
- Education: Chung-Ang University - Theater and Film
- Occupations: Actress; radio DJ
- Years active: 1989–present
- Spouse: Cha In-pyo (m. 1995)
- Children: 3

Korean name
- Hangul: 신애라
- Hanja: 辛愛羅
- RR: Sin Aera
- MR: Sin Aera

Shin Ae-ra (Korean: 신애라; born March 7, 1969) is a South Korean actress who made her acting debut in 1989. She has since played leading roles in television dramas such as Love in Your Arms and Bad Housewife.

== Personal life ==
In 1995, Shin married actor Cha In-pyo, and the couple gained widespread admiration and respect from the Korean public for being philanthropists. They are active volunteers at orphanages and welfare centers, as well as generous donors to causes such as the fight against child abuse and school violence, rights for North Korean refugees, and humanitarian aid to underprivileged children (particularly in North Korea and Uganda). Shin and Cha often collaborate with organizations such as Compassion International and the Social Welfare Society.

Shin Ae-ra and her husband Cha In-pyo, have three children. Shin gave birth to their son, Cha Jeong-min in 1998, but she and her husband made headlines when they adopted baby girls, Cha Ye-eun in 2005, and Cha Ye-jin in 2008. Their case highlighted the issue of adoption in Korea, where despite the prevalence of overseas adoption, domestic adoption remains rare and is often stigmatized due to culturally held beliefs stressing "pure" bloodlines.

Shin and Cha's case was even more notable as it is uncommon for Korean couples with biological children of their own to adopt, and they were lauded for serving as positive role models.

== Filmography ==
=== Television series ===
Year	Title	Hangul	Role	Network
1989	Angel's Choice	천사의 선택		MBC
1990	A Tree Blooming with Love	사랑이 꽃피는 나무	Young-seon	KBS1
1990	My Mother	나의 어머니	Second daughter-in-law	MBC
1990	Years of Ambition	야망의 세월	Choi Tae-hee	KBS2
1991	The Woman Sets the Dining Table	밥상을 차리는 여자	Eun-soo	KBS2
1991	What Is Love?	사랑이 뭐길래	Park Jung-ran	MBC
1992	Ambitions on Sand	모래위의 욕망	So-young	SBS
1992		언제나 신혼	Go Man-soon	KBS1
1993	Our Hot Song	우리들 뜨거운 노래	Jae-hee	SBS
1993	Lover	연인	Min Hee-kyung	KBS2
1994	Three Men, Three Women	세 남자 세 여자	Cha Se-ran	SBS
1994	Love in Your Arms	사랑을 그대 품안에	Lee Jin-joo	MBC
1995	Flames of Ambition	야망의 불꽃	Kim Chae-hyun	SBS
1997	Conditions of Love	사랑의 조건	Jung-min	MBC
1997	Best Theater: "Things That Are Different From What You Might Expect"	베스트극장: 짐작과는 Lovers of Music 일들		MBC
1997	Baby Blues First Story: "Fetal Diary"	베이비 블루스 첫 번째 이야기: 태아일기	Hee-joo	SBS
1997	Baby Blues Second Story: "Parenting Diary"	베이비 블루스 두 번째 이야기: 육아일기	Hee-joo	SBS
1997	Tears of Roses	장미의 눈물	Baek Jang-mi	SBS
1999	You Don't Know My Mind	남의 속도 모르고	Na Do-hae	MBC
2000	My Funky Family	가문의 영광	Ae-ra	MBC
2005	Bad Housewife	불량 주부	Choi Mina	SBS
2006	My Love	마이 러브	Jang Mi-ran	SBS
2011	Indomitable Daughters-in-Law	불굴의 며느리	Oh Young-shim	MBC
2013	Ugly Alert	못난이 주의보	Jin Sun-hye (cameo)	SBS
2020	Record of Youth	청춘기록	Kim Yi-young	tvN

=== Film ===
Year	Title	Hangul	Role
2006	Ice Bar	아이스케키	Young-rae's mother
2009	The Tale of Despereaux	작은 영웅 데스페로	The Narrator (voice, Korean dubbed)
2011	Calling 3: Himalayan Schweitzer	명3: 히말라야의 슈바이처	Documentary narration
2023	Always I am	보이지 않아	Ji-yoon

=== Variety show ===
Year	Title	Hangul	Network	Notes
1991		창사 30주년 기념 - 청소년을 위한 음악회	MBC	Host
1991		여기 젊음이 - 91 대학생이 뽑은 삶의 노래 사랑의 노래	MBC	Host
1991	Weekend Comedy Theater	주말 코미디극장	MBC	Host
1992		총집합 설날 큰잔치	MBC	Host
1992	Hidden Camera	몰래카메라	MBC	Host
1994		그 사람 그 후	MBC	Host
1997	Studio of Dreams	꿈의 스튜디오	KBS2	Host
1998	Studio of Love	사랑의 스튜디오	MBC	Host
1998	New Life for Children	어린이에게 새 생명을	MBC	Host
1999	Access! Movie World	접속! 무비월드	SBS	Host
1999		우리 용서합시다	MBC	Host
1999	Childcare Diary	육아일기	EBS	Host
2001	Let's Praise	칭찬합시다	MBC	Host
2006	Doctors	닥터스	MBC	Host
2008		모성탐구 엄마가 달라졌어요	EBS	Narration
2009	Asiatic Black Bears Returned to Nature	자연으로 돌아간 반달가슴곰	SBS	Documentary narration
2009	Love - Robot Legged Sejin	사랑 - "로봇다리 세진이" 편	MBC	Documentary narration
2009	Barnacle Lou	따개비 루	EBS	Narration
2010	Tips to Become Gifted	영재의 비법	Story On	Host
2011	Documentary Three Days	다큐멘터리 3일	KBS2	Documentary narration
2012	Little Big Hero	리틀빅 히어로	tvN	Narration
2013	Korean Food Master	신애라의 요리의 정석	Olive	Narration
2014	The Return of Superman	슈퍼맨이 돌아왔다	KBS2	Narration
2020–2021	The House Detox	신박한 정리	tvN	Host with Park Na-rae, Yoon Kyun-sang
2021	Family Class	이하 금쪽 수업	Channel a	Host
2021	Family from today	오늘부터 가족	JTBC	Host
2022	As You Want	원하는대로	MBN	Tour guide

== Theater ==
Year	Title	Hangul	Role
1992	Agnes of God	신의 아그네스	Sister Agnes
1994	West Side Story	웨스트 사이드 스토리	Maria
1998	Nunsense	넌센스	Sister Robert Anne
2003	The Shoemaker's Prodigious Wife	희한한 구둣방집 마누라	Young wife
2009	Really Really Like You	진짜진짜 좋아해	Shin Jang-mi

== Radio program ==
Year	Title	Hangul	Station
1991	Our Happy Youth	기쁜 우리 젊은 날	SBS FM
1992	Like Tonight	오늘같은 밤엔	KBS 2FM
1995	Cinema Music Room	영화음악실	KBS 2FM
1997	Hopeful Music at Noon	정오의 희망곡	MBC FM
2003	To You Who Forget the Night	밤을 잊은 그대에게	KBS 2FM

== Awards and nominations ==
Year	Organization	Category	Nominated work	Result
2003		2nd Star Seonhaeng Award	—N/a	Won
2005	Korea Green Foundation	100 People Who Light Up Our World	—N/a	Won
2005	SBS Drama Awards	Excellence Award, Actress in a Drama Special	Bad Housewife	Nominated
2007	44th Grand Bell Awards	Best New Actress	Ice Bar	Nominated
2008	Asan Foundation	20th Asan Special Award	—N/a	Won
2009	Korea CEO Summit	Grand Prize, Volunteer Service category	—N/a	Won
2010	Pony Chung Foundation	4th Pony Chung Innovation Award	—N/a	Won
2011	MBC Drama Awards	Top Excellence Award, Actress in a Serial Drama	Indomitable Daughters-in-Law	Won
2013	Ministry of Culture, Sports and Tourism	32nd Sejong Munhwa Award	—N/a	Won
