= Ice Bar =

2006 South Korean film

- Main Poster
- Hangul: 아이스케키
- RR: Aiseukeki
- MR: Aisŭk'ek'i
- Directed by: Yeo In-gwang
- Screenplay by: Yeon Mi-jung
- Produced by: Shim Jae Myung
- Starring: Park Ji-bin; Shin Ae-ra
- Cinematography: Hwang Ki Suk
- Edited by: Heo Sun Mi
- Music by: Lee Byeong Hun
- Production company: MK Pictures
- Release date: August 24, 2006
- Running time: 95 minutes
- Country: South Korea
- Language: Korean

Ice Bar (Korean: 아이스케키; RR: Aiseukeki) is a 2006 South Korean family film, directed by Yeo In-gwang and starring Park Ji-bin and Shin Ae-ra. It was released on August 24, 2006 in South Korea. The film won the best film award at the 21st Fukuoka International Film Festival in 2007.

== Synopsis ==
In 1969, Korea. Ten-year-old Young-rae (Park Ji-Bin) lives alone with his mother (Shin Ae Ra) in the countryside. Life is difficult for them and his mother is forced to illegally sell imported cosmetics on the street. But Young-rae is plucky and can stand up to anything including defending his mother — anything except when other kids call him names for being "fatherless." So when he hears that the father he had only dreamed of is alive and living in Seoul, he makes it his life goal to get to the city and find him. The only way to get there, however, is a long and expensive train ride. To raise money, Young-rae starts to sell ice cream bars.

== Cast ==
=== Main ===
- Park Ji-bin as Young-rae
- Shin Ae-ra as Young-rae's mother

=== Supporting ===
- Jin Goo as In-baek, manager of the 'Ice Cake' factory
- Hahm Eun-jung as Mi-sook
- Kim Ja Young as Suk Joon's mother
- Kwon Byung Gil as the teacher
- Lee Jae-ryong as Young Rae's father
- Ko Chang-seok as a cop
- Lee A-In as Cart owner's granddaughter
- Yang Joo Ho as Seung Il
- Kim Kyung-ran as Choon Ja's mother
- Kim Sun-Young as Choon Ja

=== Guests ===
- Kang Sung Hae as Seok Soon's father
- Park Chang Ik as Seung Il's group member}
- Kim Young Sun as Mad woman
- Yoon Hee Chul as the CEO
- Uhm Hyun Kyung

== Release ==
Ice Bar premiered in South Korea on August 24, 2006. In February 2007, it was invited at 57th Berlin International Film Festival in 'Generation section'.

=== Home media ===
Streaming rights of the film were sold to online streaming services Naver, Amazon's Prime Video and AsianCrush among others.

== Awards and nominations ==
Award	Year	Category	Nominee	Result	Ref.
The 7th Gatchi Spring Film Festival	2006	Screening	Yeo In-Gwang	Nominated	
Women in Film Korea Festival	2006	Women in Film Korea Award	Mi-jeong Yeon	Won	
The 1st Korea Film Acting Awards	2007	Nominee film	Ice Bar	Nominated	
The 44th Grand Bell Awards	2007	Best New Actress Award	Shin Ae Ra	Nominated	
57th Berlin International Film Festival	2007	Generation Category	Ice Bar	Nominated	
Toronto Sprocket Children's Film Festival	2007	Competing film	Ice Bar	Nominated	
21st Fukuoka Asian Film Festival	2007	Best Picture (Grand Prize)	Ice Bar	Won	
21st Fukuoka Asian Film Festival	2007	Screening	Yeo In-Gwang	Nominated	
Italy G-Pony Film Festival	2007	Competing film	Ice Bar	Nominated	
Mill Valley Film Festival	2007	World Cinema	Ice Bar	Nominated	
