= Law and the City =

2025 South Korean television series

- Promotional poster
- Hangul: 서초동
- Hanja: 瑞草동
- RR: Seochodong
- MR: Sŏch'odong
- Genre: Legal drama
- Written by: Lee Seung-hyun
- Directed by: Park Seung-woo
- Starring: Lee Jong-suk; Moon Ga-young; Kang You-seok; Ryu Hye-young; Im Seong-jae
- Music by: Gaemi
- Country of origin: South Korea
- Original language: Korean
- No. of episodes: 12

Production
- Executive producers: Kim Ho-jun (CP); Kang Bo-ah
- Producers: Kim Dong-jun; Yoo Ho-seong; Park Se-eun; Kwak Ji-won; Lee Min-yong
- Running time: 70 minutes
- Production company: Chorokbaem Media

Original release
- Network: tvN
- Release: July 5 – August 10, 2025

Law and the City (서초동) is a 2025 South Korean television series written by Lee Seung-hyun, directed by Park Seung-woo, and starring Lee Jong-suk, Moon Ga-young, Kang You-seok, Ryu Hye-young, and Im Seong-jae. Set in Seoul's Seocho Judicial Town, the drama depicts the joys and sorrows of five young lawyers as they navigate the demanding legal world, personal challenges, and evolving friendships while working daily in Seocho-dong Law Town.It aired on tvN from July 5, to August 10 2025, every Saturday and Sunday at 21:20 (KST). The series is also available for streaming on Disney+ and Rakuten Viki in select regions.

== Synopsis ==
Ahn Joo-hyung, Kang Hee-ji, Jo Chang-won, Bae Moon-jung, and Kang Sang-ki are labeled as the five members of the "Associate Lawyers Avengers" share their precious lunch breaks together and work at Seochodong Judicial Town.

== Cast and characters ==
=== Main ===
- Lee Jong-suk as Ahn Joo-hyung

A senior associate at Kyungmin Law Firm on the 7th Floor. Despite having nine years of experience with the firm he has no desire to eventually start his own practice. He chose to become a lawyer because he enjoyed the logical problem solving.

- Moon Ga-young as Kang Hee-ji

A newly hired lawyer at Johwa Law Firm on the 8th Floor. She has an optimistic personality and sympathises deeply with her clients. With two years of experience, she is the most recent addition to the meal crew after her predecessor resigns.

- Kang You-seok as Jo Chang-won

An associate from Junggong Law Firm on the 5th Floor. His skills are often overlooked as he is from a wealthy family. He shares a close friendship with Sang-ki.

- Ryu Hye-young as Bae Moon-jung

A senior associate who works at the same law firm as Joo-hyung. She has a kind but competitive personality, and is dedicated to her work as a lawyer.

- Im Seong-jae as Ha Sang-ki

A senior associate at Hojun Legal Office on the 6th Floor. He is good-natured but is sometimes teased by the crew for his frugal tendencies. He runs a restaurant blog called "Lawyer's Table" and faithfully uploads the meals he eats at their gatherings.

=== Hyungmin Building ===
- Yeom Hye-ran as Kim Hyung-min

Landlord of the Hyungmin Building, works on the 4th floor. Proposed the merger of all the firms and now serves as a consultant at Hyungmin Law Firm.

- Lee Seo-hwan as Seong Yoo-deok

Former head lawyer of Junggong Law Firm (5th floor), now one of the lead attorneys at Hyungmin Law Firm. Employer of Chang-won.

- Jung Hye-young as Kang Jung-yoon

Former head lawyer of Daehwa Law Firm (8th floor), now one of the lead attorneys at Hyungmin Law Firm. Employer of Hee-ji.

- Park Hyung-soo as Noh Kyung-min

Former head lawyer of Kyungmin Law Firm (7th floor), now one of the lead attorneys at Hyungmin Law Firm. Employer of Joo-hyung and Moon-jung.

- Kim Ji-hyun as Kim Ryoo-jin

Former head lawyer of Hojun Law Firm (6th floor), now one of the lead attorneys at Hyungmin Law Firm. Employer of Sang-gi.

=== Others ===
- Choi Chan-ho as Kim Seung-guk

Plaintiff in the assault case handled by Joo-hyung, and romantic partner of the defendant Park Kyung-hyun.

- Jeon Gwang-jin as Kim Jae-wan

Client of Joo-hyung. Creditor representing Hyangrin Savings Bank.

- Jeon Seok-chan as Jang Hyun-seok

Debtor who took a loan against a public housing deposit but could not repay. Once sought advice from Daehwa Law Firm.

- Jung Kyu-soo as Kim Gil-nam

Debtor in a Daehwa Law Firm case. Owned a luxury home but tried to hide assets, leading to a court-ordered asset freeze.

- Kim Young-woong as Koo Dong-gyun

Client of Hee-ji. Chief surgeon at Sinmun University Hospital.

- Lee Doo-seok as Kim Jung-soo

Client of Hee-ji. Administrative director at Sinmun University Hospital.

- Kim Yong-joon as Chang-won's father
- Kim Jae-rok as Joo-hyung's father.
- Kim Tae-jung as Jang Soo-gil

Son of Chairman Jang Gwang-gi, detained in custody. Seong Yoo-deok asks Chang-won to talk with him daily.

- Oh Dae-hwan

=== Special appearances ===
- Kim Kyung-nam as Yoo Dong-wook (Ep. 1)

Assistant attorney at Daehwa Law Firm (8th floor) and original member of the Dinner Crew. Replaced by Hee-ji after leaving.

- Kim Do-hoon as (Ep. 1)

- Ko Geon-han as Park Kyung-hyun (Ep. 1)

Joo-hyung's client. A legally blind man accused in an assault case.

- Choi Mina Sue as Lee Jung-min (Ep. 1)

Joo-hyung's blind date partner.

- Yoon Kyun-sang as Kim Ji-seok

Moon-jung's husband and high school friend of Joo-hyung. He works as a nurse in a university hospital.

- Nam Yoon-ho as Cha Jung-ho (Ep. 3–4)

Joo-hyung's client in a divorce case. Husband of Park Soo-jin.

- Lee Yoo-young as Park Soo-jin (Ep. 3–4)

Joo-hyung's ex-girlfriend.

- Kim Tae-hoon as Hee-ji's father (Ep. 4)
- Jeon Jin-seo as Moon Chan-young (Ep. 9–10)

== Production ==
=== Development ===
The series is directed by Park Seung-woo, written by Lee Seung-hyun, who is a lawyer herself, planned by CJ ENM Studios, and Chorokbaem Media managed the production.

=== Casting ===
In September 2024, it was reported that Lee Jong-suk would be appearing in director Park Seung-woo's new drama Seochodong. This would be the first time in 8 years that Lee and director Park working together on a project since W (2016). The next month, Moon Ga-young's agency stated that she has been offered a role in the drama and is positively considering it.

On November 5, Lee was officially confirmed to star for the series. According to OSEN on November 15, Ryu Hye-young would appear in the series. Moon was officially confirmed as the female lead of the series on November 19. The next day, it was reported that Kang You-seok has been cast. On November 28, the line up of actors were revealed namely Lee, Moon, Kang, Ryu, and Im Seong-jae.

=== Filming ===
Principal photography began at the end of 2024, with a goal to air in 2025.

== Release ==
Law and the City premiered on tvN on 5 July 2025, airing every Saturday and Sunday at 21:20 (KST). The series has also been made available on multiple over-the-top (OTT) platforms for international audiences including Disney+ and Rakuten Viki for some markets.

== Viewership ==
Law and the City : South Korea viewers per episode (millions)

Season	Episode number												Average
Season	1	2	3	4	5	6	7	8	9	10	11	12	Average
1	1.155	1.293	1.108	1.472	1.346	1.486	1.331	1.309	1.338	1.524	1.570	1.760	1.391

Source: Audience measurement performed nationwide by Nielsen Korea.

Average TV viewership ratings
Ep.	Original broadcast date	Average audience share (Nielsen Korea)	
Ep.	Original broadcast date	Nationwide	Seoul
1	July 5, 2025	4.614% (1st)	4.789% (1st)
2	July 6, 2025	5.122% (1st)	5.079% (1st)
3	July 12, 2025	4.411% (1st)	4.562% (1st)
4	July 13, 2025	5.599% (1st)	5.590% (1st)
5	July 19, 2025	5.386% (1st)	5.749% (1st)
6	July 20, 2025	6.111% (1st)	6.148% (1st)
7	July 26, 2025	5.693% (1st)	5.672% (1st)
8	July 27, 2025	5.782% (1st)	5.682% (1st)
9	August 2, 2025	5.498% (1st)	5.788% (1st)
10	August 3, 2025	6.058% (1st)	6.588% (1st)
11	August 9, 2025	6.391% (1st)	6.592% (1st)
12	August 10, 2025	7.705% (1st)	7.502% (1st)
Average		5.698%	5.812%
In the table above, the blue numbers represent the lowest ratings and the red numbers represent the highest ratings.; This drama airs on a cable channel/pay TV which normally has a relatively smaller audience compared to free-to-air TV/public broadcasters (KBS, SBS, MBC, and EBS).
