= Extraordinary Attorney Woo =

South Korean television series

- Promotional poster
- Hangul: 이상한 변호사 우영우
- Lit.: Strange Lawyer Woo Young-woo
- RR: Isanghan byeonhosa U Yeongu
- MR: Isanghan pyŏnhosa U Yŏngu
- Genre: Legal drama
- Written by: Moon Ji-won
- Directed by: Yoo In-shik
- Starring: Park Eun-bin; Kang Tae-oh; Kang Ki-young
- Music by: Noh Young-shim
- Country of origin: South Korea
- Original language: Korean
- No. of episodes: 16

Production
- Executive producers: Lee Joo-ho; Lee Jeong-hwa (CP)
- Producers: Lee Sang-baek; Kim Eun-soon; Kim Young-ha
- Editors: Jo In-hyung; Lim Ho-cheol
- Running time: 64–82 minutes
- Production companies: AStory; KT Studio Genie; Nangman Crew
- Budget: ₩15 billion

Original release
- Network: ENA
- Release: June 29 – August 18, 2022

Extraordinary Attorney Woo (Korean: 이상한 변호사 우영우) is a 2022 South Korean television series starring Park Eun-bin in the title role, along with Kang Tae-oh and Kang Ki-young. It follows Woo Young-woo, an autistic female rookie attorney hired by a major law firm in Seoul. Because she is different from her neurotypical peers, they perceive her manner of communicating as odd, awkward, and blunt. With each legal case and through her intelligence and photographic memory, she becomes an increasingly competent attorney and earns recognition from other legal professionals and appreciation from her clients.

The show aired on ENA from June 29 to August 18, 2022, every Wednesday and Thursday at 21:00 Korean Standard Time (UTC+09:00), for sixteen episodes. It is also available for streaming on Netflix in selected regions.

Extraordinary Attorney Woo set the record for the highest ratings in ENA history. It received audience acclaim, with its final episode recording 17.5% nationwide ratings, making it the tenth highest-rated drama in Korean cable television history and eighth highest-rated television drama by number of viewers.

== Synopsis ==
Extraordinary Attorney Woo tells the story of Woo Young-woo, an autistic lawyer who is raised by her single father. She grows up with one friend at school, Dong Geu-ra-mi, an oddball girl who protects her from school bullies. She graduates at the top of her law school class at Seoul National University. Because she is autistic, law firms refuse to hire her. However, through a connection of her father's, she obtains her first job at Hanbada, a large Seoul law firm. Attorney Woo's intelligence and photographic memory help her to become an excellent lawyer, as she is able to recall perfectly both laws and everything else she reads, sees, or hears.

Being different from neurotypical peers, her manner of communication is initially seen as odd and awkward, and her strong emotional intelligence remains unrecognized. But as the series progresses, many of the people she meets, such as her supervising lawyer, Jung Myung-seok, her law school classmate and peer, Choi Su-yeon, and paralegal Lee Jun-ho adjust to her as she learns her craft as a rookie attorney. But she also encounters people who are prejudiced against her and against others with disabilities, including her colleague Kwon Min-woo, who often tries to sabotage her.

Many of the legal cases in the series involve finely balanced legal issues and sometimes difficult ethical questions. Attorney Woo's approach is often unique and helps resolve cases in unexpected ways. One storyline about Young-woo's parents runs through the series and involves the rivalry between two major law firms, both chaired by female attorneys, Han Seon-young, CEO of Hanbada, and Tae Soo-mi, CEO of Taesan. Another storyline focuses on Attorney Woo's budding romance with Lee Jun-ho.

A theme that runs throughout the series is Young-woo's special interest in whales. Her tendency to analogize situations she faces in her professional and private life with the lives and characteristics of whales and dolphins often surprises and confounds the people who surround her. Her eureka moments are often accompanied by mental images of marine animals.

== Cast and characters ==
=== Main ===
- Park Eun-bin as Woo Young-woo; a rookie lawyer at Hanbada law firm, she is the first attorney with ASD in Korea.
  - Oh Ji-yul as young Woo Young-woo
- Kang Tae-oh as Lee Joon-ho; an employee in the litigation team at Hanbada
- Kang Ki-young as Jung Myung-seok; a senior attorney at Hanbada and Woo Young-woo's mentor

=== Supporting ===
- Jeon Bae-soo as Woo Gwang-ho; Woo Young-woo's single father
  - Jang Seong-beom as young Gwang-ho
- Baek Ji-won as Han Seon-young; CEO of Hanbada
- Jin Kyung as Tae Soo-mi; CEO of Taesan law firm and biological mother of Young-woo
  - Jung Han-bit as young Tae Soo-mi
- Ha Yoon-kyung as Choi Soo-yeon; Woo Young-woo's law school classmate and colleague at Hanbada
- Joo Jong-hyuk as Kwon Min-woo; Woo Young-woo's colleague and rival at Hanbada
- Joo Hyun-young as Dong Geu-ra-mi; Woo Young-woo's best friend since their school days
- Im Seong-jae as Kim Min-shik; owner of the pub where Dong Geu-ra-mi works

=== Other characters ===
- Kang Ae-shim as Choi Yeong-ran, the wife of Gwang-ho's past landlord and Young-woo's first client (ep. 1)
- Ha Young as Kim Hwa-young (ep. 2); a client of Hanbada who has a wardrobe malfunction with her wedding dress.
- Park Yu-rim as Kang Ji-hye (ep. 2); a wedding hall employee
- Yoon Joo-sang as Kim Jeong-gu (ep. 2); Kim Hwa-young's father
- Yoon Yoo-sun as Jeon Gyeong-hee (ep. 3); Kim Jeong-hoon's mother
- Choi Dae-hoon as Jang Seung-jun (eps. 3, 6, 15, 16); an attorney at Hanbada, and Jung Myung-seok's rival
- Lee Sung-wook as Hwang Doo-yong (ep. 5); sales manager at Ihwa ATM.
- Kim Hieora as Gye Hyang-sim (ep. 6); a client of Hanbada who is a North Korean defector
- Lee Ki-young as Ryu Myung-ha (eps. 6, 12); judge sitting on Gye Hyang-shim's and Kim Hyun-jeong's cases
- Kim Sung-bum as Jo Hyeon-woo (eps. 7–8); a resident of Sodeokdong village
- Park Kang-seop as Park Yoo-jin (eps. 7–8); a civil servant at Gyeonghae provincial office
- Park Yoon-hee as the judge in charge of Sodeok-dong hackberry case (eps. 7–8)
- Lee Doo-seok as Lee Jun-bum (eps. 8–10, 14, 16); a reporter from Jungui Ilbo who is close to Hanbada
- Koo Kyo-hwan as Bang Gu-ppong (ep. 9); commander of the Children's Liberation Army
- Oh Hye-soo as Shin Hye-yeong (ep. 10); a woman with an intellectual disability
- Lee Won-jung as Yang Jeong-il (ep. 10); Shin Hye-yeong's boyfriend
- Seo Hye-won as Choi Da-hae (ep. 11); a coffee salesperson at the casino
- Lee Bong-ryun as Ryu Jae-sook (ep. 12); an attorney specializing in gender discrimination cases
- Lee Yoon-ji as Choi Ji-soo (eps. 13–14, 16); Jung Myung-seok's ex-wife
- Yoon Na-moo as Jung-nam (ep. 13); Lee Jun-ho's brother-in-law
- Kim Joo-hun as Bae In-cheol (eps. 15–16); CEO and founder of Raon
- Ryu Kyung-hwan as Kim Chan-hong (eps. 15–16); co-CEO and co-founder of Raon
- Choi Hyun-jin as Choi Sang-hyeon (eps. 15–16); Young-woo's younger half-brother and son of Tae Soo-mi

== Episodes ==
No.	Title	Original release date	South Korea viewers (millions)
1	"Extraordinary Attorney Woo"; Transliteration: "Isanghan Byeonhosa U-yeong-u" (Korean: 이상한 변호사 우영우)	June 29, 2022	N/A
In 2000, Woo Young-woo is a seemingly nonverbal child on the autism spectrum. When her father, Woo Gwang-ho, is attacked by a neighbor's jealous husband, she finally speaks—citing definitions of assault memorized from her father's legal library. Twenty-two years later, Young-woo has graduated from Seoul National University at the top of her class and begins her first day at the Hanbada law firm. Senior attorney Jung Myung-seok does not want the awkward newcomer on his team, but CEO Han Seon-young agrees that he can dismiss Young-woo if she mishandles her first case: defending her childhood neighbor, charged with attempting to murder her husband. Though a plea bargain for attempted murder has been set, Young-woo realizes this would invalidate the defendant's pension and leave her homeless. The short-tempered husband dies after cross-examination from Young-woo, who extracts testimony from a medical expert that he could have suffered from an underlying subdural hematoma. The charge is reduced to assault, and the defendant receives probation, with her pension and home intact. Young-woo is aided in her new job by her colleague Lee Jun-ho, navigating everyday obstacles like their office building's revolving door.
2	"The Wedding Dress That Slipped Off"; Transliteration: "Heulleonaerin Wedingdeureseu" (Korean: 흘러내린 웨딩드레스)	June 30, 2022	0.396
At her lavish wedding prepared by the Daehyeon Hotel, bride Kim Hwa-young trips on her dress, exposing herself and her tattoo of the Buddhist figure Guanyin. Humiliated, her father, Kim Jeong-gu, rejects his lawyers' advice to accept the hotel's generous refund and hires Hanbada instead. Determined to outdo rival law firm Taesan, Seon-young agrees to pursue ₩1 billion in compensation. A wedding gift to the bride's family of land worth ₩33.2 billion will not occur due to the botched wedding, which Young-woo suggests entitles Jeong-gu to special damages, despite his daughter's unhappiness with the arranged marriage. Posing as a couple to investigate the hotel's wedding business, Jun-ho sees Young-woo in a different light after she tries on a wedding dress. He enlists a bridal assistant from the hotel to testify that Hwa-young's dress was switched for a looser-fitting version. As the actual aggrieved party, Hwa-young withdraws the lawsuit, telling her father she is in fact a Buddhist and revealing her true love, her girlfriend. Young-woo comes to the attention of Taesan's CEO, Tae Soo-mi.
3	"This Is Pengsoo"; Transliteration: "Pengsuro Hagesseumnida" (Korean: 펭수로 하겠습니다)	July 6, 2022	1.069
Kim Jeong-hoon, a young severely autistic man, is discovered apparently attacking his older brother, a brilliant medical student who dies intoxicated with mysteriously broken ribs. Their father, a Hanbada client, asks the firm to handle Jeong-hoon's defense. Young-woo, following her father's advice on getting through to her as a child, tries to communicate with Jeong-hoon through his love of Pengsoo. Young-woo and Jun-ho find evidence that the older brother tried to hang himself, but his parents refuse to accept that he was suicidal. The prosecution uses Young-woo's high-functioning autism to argue against the defendant's diminished capacity. Young-woo is removed from the case, despite Myung-seok's protests, and the case is reassigned to his rival. In her office, Young-woo appears to attempt to hang herself but is saved by Jun-ho. She realizes that Jeong-hoon attempted to save his brother in the same way, breaking the deceased's ribs in the fall and by trying to perform CPR. The charges are reduced to bodily injury, and Jeong-hoon is ruled mentally incompetent; a disenchanted Young-woo resigns from Hanbada.
4	"The Strife of the Three Brothers"; Transliteration: "Samhyeongje-ui Nan" (Korean: 삼형제의 난)	July 7, 2022	1.391
Dong Dong-sam, the father of Young-woo's best friend, Dong Geu-ra-mi, inherits land from his late father worth ₩10 billion. His older brothers pressure and deceive him into signing an agreement giving him only 20% but making him solely responsible for all taxes, which leaves him ₩260 million in debt. Young-woo no longer considers herself an attorney but agrees to help as a personal favor. An eavesdropping neighbor overheard the brothers intimidate Dong-sam but changes his story in court. Young-woo advises Geu-ra-mi to create a drunken scene at her grandfather's memorial, leading her uncles to attack her and her father, which invokes a section of the civil code that invalidates the agreement. Dong-sam is entitled to the entire inheritance but, after apologies from his brothers, agrees to divide the inheritance equally. Geu-ra-mi urges Jun-ho to confess his feelings for Young-woo. Myung-seok kindly chooses "not to process" Young-woo's resignation, and she rejoins the firm.
5	"Wild Card VS Tactician"; Transliteration: "Udangtangtang VS Gwonmosulsu" (Korean: 우당탕탕 VS 권모술수)	July 13, 2022	2.565
Hanbada is hired by ATM manufacturer Ihwa, who accuses rival company Geumgang of copying their technology, which Geumgang claims is an open-source design Ihwa is fraudulently trying to patent. "Wild card" Young-woo leads the case alongside her competitive colleague, "tactician" Kwon Min-woo, who openly sabotages her. Geu-ra-mi and Jun-ho advise Young-woo how to detect when people are lying. Imha's convincing false testimony results in an injunction against Geumgang. Young-woo shows Min-woo a letter from the head of Geumgang begging her to pursue the truth as an honorable attorney, but he reminds her that their duty is to win for their client. Geumgang tracks down the last remaining ATM from a defunct company that used the same design, proving the technology pre-dated Imha's patent. The injunction is lifted, but Imha has already taken over Geumgang's contracts and ruined their business. Young-woo displays the letter on the wall of her office as a reminder to herself. As a candidate for Minister of Justice, Tae Soo-mi denies rumors that she had a child out of wedlock.
6	"If I Were a Whale..."; Transliteration: "Naega Gorae-yeotdamyeon..." (Korean: 내가 고래였다면...)	July 14, 2022	2.529
Young-woo and her colleague Choi Soo-yeon become emotionally invested in defending Gye Hyang-sim, a North Korean defector. Five years earlier, she was arrested after demanding money from a badly beaten debtor but fled to care for her young daughter and has now come forward to accept punishment. A drunken miscommunication leads Min-woo to mistakenly tell Soo-yeon that Jun-ho has feelings for her. Arguing that the victim's wounds were caused by her abusive husband, Young-woo questions the doctor who examined her, who admits his bias against defectors. Young-woo argues that under North Korean law, the defendant would be guilty of a lesser crime, but Hyang-sim confesses that she intended to get the money at any cost. While the jury deliberates, Young-woo and Soo-yeon sneak into the judge's chambers with a final plea for leniency. Telling Soo-yeon about mother whales' bond with their children, Young-woo struggles with her own mother's abandonment. The jury unanimously sentences Hyang-sim to four years in prison, but the judge imposes probation instead, in light of her honest confession. Shopping with Soo-yeon, Young-woo nearly crosses paths with Tae Soo-mi.
7	"A Tale About Sodeok-Dong I"; Transliteration: "Sodeokdong I-yagi I" (Korean: 소덕동 이야기 I)	July 20, 2022	2.971
The villagers of Sodeok-dong are distressed by plans for a highway that would cut through town. The head of Sodeok-dong convinces Myung-seok's team to handle the lawsuit against the construction after bringing them to see the colorful village. Taesan is hired as opposing counsel, led by Tae Soo-mi herself. She and Young-woo are impressed by each other, upsetting Young-woo's father. He accuses Han Seon-young of hiring Young-woo as a pawn in her rivalry with Soo-mi, who Young-woo is unaware is her mother. Despite Soo-mi's flashy presentations, Young-woo's eidetic memory proves that the highway plans were finalized before a required environmental impact study, and the judge is persuaded to visit Sodeok-dong himself. Soo-yeon urges Young-woo and Jun-ho to face their feelings for each other. Young-woo's father tells her that he and Seon-young were friends in law school, and that she hired Young-woo at his request. Deeply hurt, Young-woo leaves home. Min-woo, frustrated by what he perceives as Young-woo's "special treatment", writes an anonymous post on Hanbada's website about the company's "corrupt hiring practices".
8	"A Tale About Sodeok-Dong II"; Transliteration: "Sodeokdong I-yagi II" (Korean: 소덕동 이야기 II)	July 21, 2022	3.404
Despite gossip about Young-woo and nepotism, Soo-yeon defends her to Min-woo and the rest of the firm. At the judge's on-site verification, Sodeok-dong's appeal is dampened by rain. Taesan has already convinced residents to sign consent forms for construction by suggesting potentially higher compensation. The judge will dismiss the lawsuit if most of the residents consent, leading Taesan to flood the village with interns collecting signatures. Soo-mi offers Young-woo a job with Taesan, further frustrating Min-woo. Young-woo tells her father that she has decided to move out and join Taesan, and he reveals that Soo-mi is her mother. Overwhelmed, Young-woo collapses, and her father tells her the truth: he and Soo-mi met in law school, but she rejected him when she became pregnant. After she gave birth, he dropped out to raise Young-woo by himself. Learning that Sodeok-dong's prized hackberry tree was prevented from being considered a natural monument, Young-woo secures the tree's protected status, ending construction and uniting the village. Revealing to Soo-mi that she is her daughter, Young-woo declines her offer.
9	"The Pied Piper"; Transliteration: "Piribuneun Sana-i" (Korean: 피리부는 사나이)	July 27, 2022	4.068
Young-woo defends an eccentric young man who has adopted the humorous name "Bang Gu-ppong" (which can be translated as "fart") and is charged with kidnapping a busload of children who were supposed to attend his mother's hagwon academy. Instead, Gu-ppong—self-declared leader of the "Children's Liberation Army"—took them into the woods to play. Jun-ho and Young-woo learn the children are forced to study all day and night, prompting Gu-ppong to try to free them of the intense pressure from parents and schools. A heartfelt plea from Gu-ppong's mother convinces the children's mothers not to pursue a lawsuit. Abandoning her team's plan to deem Gu-ppong mentally unfit, Young-woo helps him declare his philosophy of play as a "political offender". Myung-seok chastises Min-woo for antagonizing Young-woo. The mothers agree to let their children attend the trial, where Gu-ppong leads them in a joyous recitation of his motto: play, be healthy, and be happy. Young-woo struggles to demonstrate her affection for Jun-ho, and they finally confess their feelings for each other, but she runs away. Visiting Gwang-ho, Soo-mi is secretly photographed by a reporter who connects her to Young-woo.
10	"Holding Hands Can Wait"; Transliteration: "Sonjapgineun Da-eum-e" (Korean: 손잡기는 다음에)	July 28, 2022	4.030
Young-woo intervenes when a young man, Yang Jeong-il, is arrested on the subway. Charged with quasi-rape of Shin Hye-yeong, a woman with intellectual disabilities, Jeong-il claims that he and Hye-yeong are in a loving relationship, and Young-woo agrees to defend him. Jeong-il's affectionate texts with Hye-yeong are contradicted by her statement to the police. After meeting Young-woo without her overprotective mother, Hye-yeong testifies that the relationship was consensual, but the prosecution asserts that the sexual encounter drove her to self-harm. The jury finds Jeong-il not guilty of sexual assault, but the judge sentences him to two years in prison as a sex offender. Young-woo sets Soo-yeon up on an unsuccessful date with Kim Min-shik, Geu-ra-mi's boss. Young-woo and Jun-ho work toward becoming an official couple, an endeavor complicated by Young-woo's aversion to touch and judgement from Jun-ho's friends. Despite that, they share their first kiss. Soo-mi presents Gwang-ho with an offer for Young-woo to join Taesan's Boston branch, near numerous autism specialists, but he angrily throws her out.
11	"Mr. Salt, Ms. Pepper, and Attorney Soy Sauce"; Transliteration: "Sogeumgun Huchu-yang Ganjangbyeonhosa" (Korean: 소금군 후추양 간장변호사)	August 3, 2022	3.788
Hanbada is hired by Shin Il-soo, who bought lottery tickets with two gambling buddies, one of whom reneged on their promise to split the winnings after his ticket won the ₩6 billion jackpot. A casino employee witnessed their agreement to share the prize but is unwilling to testify as an undocumented immigrant. Il-soo persuades employee Choi Da-hae to testify about the agreement instead, and the judge rules that the prize must be shared between the three men. Young-woo realizes Il-soo is having an affair with Da-hae and plans to divorce his wife, Sung Soo-ji. Young-woo and Jun-ho try to warn Soo-ji in coded language without violating attorney-client privilege. Il-soo is killed in a car accident in front of Young-woo, which causes her to experience sensory overload and an autistic meltdown. Soo-ji inherits his prize money. Soo-yeon's new boyfriend is revealed to be a con artist preying on women with elite jobs. Young-woo finds herself thinking about Jun-ho as often as she does about whales. Deducing the truth about Young-woo's mother, Min-woo blackmails Soo-mi, who agrees to hire him at Taesan if he can force Young-woo out of Hanbada.
12	"Yangtze River Dolphin (Note: The title of the episode is a reference to the endangered species of dolphins called the Yangtze River Dolphin, which is used as a metaphor for attorneys fighting for people's rights.)" Transliteration: "Yangjjeugang Dolgorae" (Korean: 양쯔강 돌고래)	August 4, 2022	4.103
Myung-seok's team defends an insurance company in a gender discrimination case. Faced with downsizing, the company had targeted 112 married couples by threatening the husbands' jobs if their wives did not resign instead, causing most married women to quit. Activist attorney Ryu Jae-sook represents the only two women willing to take on the company, and her belief in an attorney's duty to protect vulnerable people leaves Young-woo conflicted. Exploiting this, Min-woo tries to frame Young-woo by sending Jae-sook damaging Hanbada documents, but she is protected by Jae-sook's goodwill. Jae-sook submits evidence that the company's human resources manager was directly ordered to force female employees to resign; nevertheless, the judge dismisses the plaintiffs' claims of discrimination. Undeterred, Jae-sook invites Young-woo and Soo-yeon to a rooftop party with her and the plaintiffs, and returns the documents. Gwang-ho confronts Young-woo after seeing her kiss Jun-ho, who is hurt that she does not already consider them to be a couple. Myung-seok grows paranoid when a murderer he defended is on the loose. The man is caught, but Myung-seok finds himself coughing up blood.
13	"The Blue Night of Jeju I"; Transliteration: "Jejudo-ui Pureunbam I" (Korean: 제주도의 푸른밤 I)	August 10, 2022	3.634
Myung-seok decides to visit a doctor after the events of the previous episode. The Hanbada team soon head to Jeju Island, along with Dong Geu-ra-mi and Kim Min-sik, after Young-woo accepts a case involving her landlady's father, who was charged an admission fee for being in the area of a local heritage site there, a temple called Hwangjisa, even though he had no intention to visit. As the case develops, Myung-seok is saddened to see that his beloved Haengbok Noodle shop closed down, and he later reveals to his coworkers how his overworking nature, typified by his honeymoon on Jeju Island, eventually caused his wife, Ji-su, to leave him. The team visits the temple, guided by the cheerful abbot. Jun-ho and Young-woo also visit the former's sister, Seung-hui, and her husband, with Seung-hui expressing disapproval over Young-woo. During the second day of court proceedings, Myung-seok clutches his stomach in pain and collapses on the floor, to everyone's shock.
14	"The Blue Night of Jeju II"; Transliteration: "Jejudo-ui Pureunbam II" (Korean: 제주도의 푸른밤 II)	August 11, 2022	3.885
At the hospital, the other lawyers learn that Myung-seok has been diagnosed with stage III stomach cancer. The Hanbada team decides to find the owner of Haengbok Noodles at Young-woo's suggestion but are unable to make meaningful progress. Ji-su visits Myung-seok in the hospital, exasperated that he has not changed despite not seeing her in five years. After speaking with Ji-su, Young-woo doubts that she would be able to make Jun-ho happy and breaks up with him. Meanwhile, Min-woo finds out that Soo-yeon likes him after she confronts him about his newfound kindness. The trial concludes with Hanbada's victory and the closure of the admission fee booth. The team visits the abbot again at Hwangjisa, who bears Hanbada no grudges and prays for Myung-seok's well-being. They accept the abbot's invitation for lunch and find out that Haengbok's owner has taken up residence at Hwangjisa as their gongyangju (cook). The team helps him reopen Haengbok via the proper legal channels, before returning to Seoul. Han Seon-young meets reporter Lee Jun-beom in her office and confirms his suspicions of Young-woo being Tae Soo-mi's daughter. She promises to tell him everything he wants to know under the condition that he publishes the article right before Soo-mi's confirmation hearing as minister of justice.
15	"Saying and Doing Things Not Asked"; Transliteration: "Mutji Anh-eun Mal, Sikiji Anh-eun Il" (Korean: 묻지 않은 말, 시키지 않은 일)	August 17, 2022	3.722
An employee working at the online retailer Raon becomes the victim of spear phishing from an unknown hacker. As a result, millions of users' financial records are compromised. Jang Seung-jun takes the place of Myung-seok as leading attorney on the case as the latter recuperates from surgery. However, he is dismissive of Young-woo and proves incompetent on the first day of court proceedings to the point of displeasing Han Seon-young. The CEO of Raon, In-cheol, tries to bribe the judge with Seung-jun and Min-woo as alumni of the same university, but the move backfires. Visiting Myeong-seok in the hospital, Young-woo is advised by him to lie low and confide in her peers. The next day, In-cheol ingests cyanide during proceedings and is rushed to the hospital. The Hanbada team is swarmed by reporters. Seung-jun abandons his coworkers and flees. Without him, they regroup at Hairy's Pub, where Young-woo realizes a crucial fact about the hacking. The team brings new information to Seung-jun, who loses his temper at Young-woo, kicking her off the case. Soo-yeon tries to defend her, but Min-woo pulls her away. Privately, she urges him to stand up for Young-woo, as she likes men who are brave. In court, Soo-yeon keeps what Young-woo said in mind and goes against Seung-jun's argument. Min-woo follows up, leaving a good impression on the judge and on Soo-yeon. Raon wins the first lawsuit. In the ending scene, it is revealed that the hacker is Tae Soo-mi's son, Choi Sang-hyeon.
16	"Though Unusual and Peculiar"; Transliteration: "Isanghago Byeollajiman" (Korean: 이상하고 별나지만)	August 18, 2022	4.449
Sang-hyeon, shown to have many of the same habits as Young-woo, confesses to Tae Soo-mi that he was behind the Raon hacking but is told to keep everything a secret. During In-cheol's absence, Kim Chan-hong has become Raon's CEO. In conversation with his ex-wife, Ji-su, a recuperating Myung-seok considers quitting Hanbada. Sang-hyeon feels guilty for In-cheol's hospitalization and meets Young-woo, revealing that Chan-hong requested that he do the hacking to convince In-cheol to spend more money on security. He gives her a flash drive containing his confession video. He also reveals that they are siblings. Han Seon-yeong wants to use the confession video against Soo-mi, but Young-woo proposes another solution, as the hacked data remains encrypted. In court, the judge does not accept the video as evidence. Raon's board fires Chan-hong. Sang-hyeon is unable to testify in person, as Soo-mi is sending him to the United States. Mending her relationship with Jun-ho, Young-woo meets Soo-mi at the National Assembly right before Soo-mi's hearing, giving an emotional plea requesting her to do the right thing for her son as a mother. After Sang-hyeon testifies, Soo-mi apologizes to the media for her son's misdeeds and steps down from her candidacy for minister of justice. The Hanbada team celebrates their victory. Young-woo is given a full-time contract at the firm and feels a sense of accomplishment in her life.

== Production ==
Filming of the series wrapped up on July 14, 2022.

On August 17, 2022, president Lee Sang-baek of AStory, the production company for Extraordinary Attorney Woo, confirmed that the drama would be renewed for a second season, which was expected to premiere in 2024.

== Original soundtrack ==
Extraordinary Attorney Woo (Original Television Soundtrack) Special

Soundtrack album by Various Artists
- Released: August 19, 2022
- Genre: Soundtrack
- Length: 1:45:46
- Languages: Korean; English
- Labels: Dreamus; AStory

The show's soundtrack album peaked at number twelve on the weekly Circle Album Chart, and as of September 2022, 12,198 copies had been sold.

Disc 1
No.	Title	Artist	Length
1.	"Brave" (용기)	Kim Jong-wan (Nell)	4:21
2.	"Beyond My Dreams" (상상)	Sunwoo Jung-a	3:05
3.	"Better Than Birthday"	O3ohn	3:46
4.	"Tuning in to You" (기울이면)	Wonstein	3:00
5.	"Inevitable" (안하기가 쉽지 않아요)	Suzy	3:51
6.	"The Blue Night of Jeju Island" (제주도의 푸른 밤)	Park Eun-bin	4:09
7.	"Flash"	Maytree	1:05
8.	"Overture"	Noh Young Shim	5:18
9.	"Woo Young-woo, the Same Backwards and Forwards"	Noh Young Shim	1:55
10.	"Prom Dance"	Noh Young Shim	2:53
11.	"Revolving Door Invites You to Dance"	Noh Young Shim	1:44
12.	"Dance with the Best Friend"	Noh Young Shim	2:16
13.	"Growing Pains"	Noh Young Shim	3:22
14.	"Young-woo's Heart (It's Hard to Read Your Mind)"	Noh Young Shim	2:55
15.	"Junho Being Brave (Let Me Be Your Hug Chair)"	Noh Young Shim	2:19
16.	"Girl Dad (It Takes Such a Long Time)"	Noh Young Shim	1:51
17.	"Ordinary Attorney"	Noh Young Shim	3:35
18.	"Spring Sunshine"	Noh Young Shim	2:02
19.	"Hackberry"	Noh Young Shim	2:21
20.	"From Whale"	Noh Young Shim	2:32
21.	"A Whale in a Frame"	Noh Young Shim	2:05
22.	"Whale Is"	Noh Young Shim	2:31
Total length:			1:02:56

Disc 2
No.	Title	Artist	Length
1.	"Brave" (용기; Inst.)	Kim Jong-wan (Nell)	4:21
2.	"Beyond My Dreams" (상상; Inst.)	Sunwoo Jung-a	3:05
3.	"Better Than Birthday" (Inst.)	O3ohn	3:46
4.	"Tuning in to You" (기울이면; Inst.)	Wonstein	3:00
5.	"Inevitable" (안하기가 쉽지 않아요; Inst.)	Suzy	3:51
6.	"The Blue Night of Jeju Island" (제주도의 푸른 밤; Inst.)	Park Eun-bin	3:43
7.	"Unanswered Questions"	KOOW	1:59
8.	"Whale Quiz"	Yoo Jong-hyun	1:49
9.	"We Are the Hanbada Crew"	Daniel Lee	1:33
10.	"Young-woo Baragi Junho"	Jo Nam-wook	2:13
11.	"Lovely W.Y.W"	Cho Byung-hyun	1:41
12.	"Do You Have Evidence?"	KOOW	1:54
13.	"Pitch W.Y.W"	Yoo Jong-hyun	1:56
14.	"Spring Love"	Jo Nam-wook	2:42
15.	"Cunning Min-woo"	Daniel Lee	2:40
16.	"One Two Three Woo Young-woo"	Cho Byung-hyun	2:37
Total length:			42:50

Original Soundtrack Parts 1–7

No.	Title	Lyrics	Music	Artist	Length
1.	"Brave" (용기)	Noh Young-shim	Noh Young-shim; Kim Jeong-bae	Kim Jong-wan (Nell)	4:21
2.	"Beyond My Dreams" (상상)	Noh Young-shim	Noh Young-shim; Kim Jeong-bae	Sunwoo Jung-a	3:05
3.	"Better Than Birthday"	Noh Young-shim; O3ohn; Joonie	Noh Young-shim; O3ohn; Joonie	O3ohn	3:46
4.	"Tuning in to You" (기울이면)	Noh Young-shim; Wonstein	Noh Young-shim; Wonstein	Wonstein	3:00
5.	"Inevitable" (안하기가 쉽지 않아요)	Noh Young-shim	Noh Young-shim	Suzy	3:51
6.	"The Blue Night of Jeju Island" (제주도의 푸른 밤)	Choi Sung-won	Choi Sung-won	Park Eun-bin	4:09
7.	"Flash"		Noh Young-shim	Maytree	1:05

== Reception ==
=== Viewership ===
The first episode of Extraordinary Attorney Woo recorded a nationwide viewership rating of 0.9%. By the third episode, which reached 4.0%, it set the record for the highest rating in ENA's history.

The series was the most viewed non-English show globally on Netflix for the weeks of July 4–10 and July 11–17, 2022, logging 23.9 million and 45.5 million hours viewed and ranking in the top ten in 12 and 22 countries, respectively. For the week of July 18–24, it was the second most-watched non-English show, gathering 55 million of viewing hours. It was also the most-watched series in eight countries and appeared in the top ten in 27 others. The series returned to the top of the chart for the week of July 25–31, with 65.5 million viewing hours, and was the most-watched show in nineteen countries, while ranking among the top ten in 25 more. Extraordinary Attorney Woo continued to top the charts for another six consecutive weeks after its finale, garnering 348.15 million viewing hours.

The series became the "sixth most popular non-English show of all time" on Netflix, spent "20 weeks on the Global Non-English Top 10 list", and marked 21 weeks in the list for November 28 – December 4, 2022.

Extraordinary Attorney Woo : South Korea viewers per episode (millions)

Season	Episode number																Average
Season	1	2	3	4	5	6	7	8	9	10	11	12	13	14	15	16	Average
1	N/A	0.396	1.069	1.391	2.565	2.529	2.975	3.404	4.068	4.030	3.788	4.103	3.634	3.885	3.722	4.449	3.067

Source: Audience measurement performed nationwide by Nielsen Korea. (Note: This average audience measurement is calculated based on published figures; the exact average audience measurement is unknown due to multiple audience measurements not published.)

Average TV viewership ratings
Ep.	Original broadcast date	Average audience share (Nielsen Korea)	
Ep.	Original broadcast date	Nationwide	Seoul
1	June 29, 2022	0.948% (32nd)	N/A
2	June 30, 2022	1.805% (4th)	1.987% (4th)
3	July 6, 2022	4.032% (2nd)	4.369% (2nd)
4	July 7, 2022	5.190% (1st)	5.703% (1st)
5	July 13, 2022	9.138% (1st)	10.297% (1st)
6	July 14, 2022	9.569% (1st)	10.364% (1st)
7	July 20, 2022	11.690% (1st)	12.960% (1st)
8	July 21, 2022	13.093% (1st)	14.970% (1st)
9	July 27, 2022	15.780% (1st)	18.078% (1st)
10	July 28, 2022	15.157% (1st)	17.178% (1st)
11	August 3, 2022	14.173% (1st)	15.384% (1st)
12	August 4, 2022	14.937% (1st)	16.253% (1st)
13	August 10, 2022	13.515% (1st)	14.796% (1st)
14	August 11, 2022	14.646% (1st)	16.075% (1st)
15	August 17, 2022	13.779% (1st)	15.506% (1st)
16	August 18, 2022	17.534% (1st)	19.210% (1st)
Average		10.937%	12.875% (Note: This average rating is calculated based on published ratings; the exact average rating is unknown due to multiple ratings not published.)
In the table above, the blue numbers represent the lowest published ratings and the red numbers represent the highest published ratings.; N/A denotes ratings that were not released.; This series aired on a cable channel/pay TV which normally has a relatively smaller audience compared to free-to-air TV/public broadcasters (KBS, SBS, MBC and EBS).

=== Critical reception ===
On Review aggregator website Rotten Tomatoes, the series has an approval rating of 100%, based on 11 reviews. The drama and Park Eun-bin's performance garnered acclaim from critics for creating awareness about an array of contemporary socio-legal issues affecting Korean society and many other countries. The Korean-American therapist Jeanie Chang praised the series for its representation of mental health and how autism is portrayed. Haley Moss, a neurodiversity expert, found Eun-bin's character to be endearing and relatable while also lauding the show as groundbreaking in Korea, where the perception of autism and available services are very different than in the United States. Saloni Gajjar, of The A.V. Club, praised the show for humanely portraying the range of people on the autism spectrum and challenging the subtle types of discrimination against them. In his review for NME, Carmen Chin wrote, "the show spurs an overarching storyline to allow for the characterisation of Young-woo's adaptability to each episodic case and client of various circumstances to take centre stage. Writing for The Korea Times, David A. Tizzard praised the show for raising awareness about issues affecting Korean society and mental health. Teen Vogue named it one of the best K-dramas of all time.

=== Themes and analysis ===
The representation of the titular character in popular culture sparked a debate around autism in South Korea and internationally, with some applauding it and others deeming it unrealistic. Karla Miller, writing for The Washington Post, said the show does many things right to bring the audience into Young-woo's corner: "Woo is sweet, likable and ultimately relatable. Because she can't really mask her autistic tendencies, we see her struggle when she tries to follow neurotypical rules for fitting in". In contrast, Lee Dong Ju, the mother of an autistic child, told a local broadcaster that the show is a pure fantasy, as for many on the spectrum, Young-woo's success would be equivalent to a kid winning an Olympic medal for cycling without being able to walk yet. Writer Tammy Kim made a dig at the drama's portrayal of feminism, saying it set unrealistic expectations in a professional sphere replete with gender inequalities.

=== Impact ===
The show became a cultural phenomenon in South Korea and sparked a number of trends. Due to its global success, including becoming the sixth most-viewed non-English drama of all time on Netflix, the series is considered one of the K-dramas spreading the so-called Korean wave internationally. Gimbap sales saw a drastic surge globally, which has been attributed to it being Young-woo's favorite food. The 500-year-old hackberry tree in Changwon featured in episodes 7 and 8 was designated a natural monument by the Cultural Heritage Administration after reportedly receiving a surge in daily visitors. The show has also contributed to an increase in the number of female protagonists in Korean dramas. Bloomberg reported that boosted by the instant success of the drama, its production company AStory's stock increased by 82%.

According to Good Data Corporation, the series ranked first in TV-OTT Drama Buzzworthiness for seven consecutive weeks, from the second to the last week of broadcasting.

== Accolades ==
=== Awards and nominations ===
Name of the award ceremony, year presented, category, nominee(s) of the award, and the result of the nomination
Award ceremony	Year	Category	Nominee / Work	Result	Ref.
APAN Star Awards	2022	Best Supporting Actress	Baek Ji-won	Won	
APAN Star Awards	2022	Best Writer	Moon Ji-won	Won	
APAN Star Awards	2022	Popularity Star Award, Actress	Park Eun-bin	Won	
APAN Star Awards	2022	Best Couple	Park Eun-bin and Kang Tae-oh	Nominated	
APAN Star Awards	2022	Best Director	Yoo In-shik	Nominated	
APAN Star Awards	2022	Best Original Soundtrack	Wonstein — "Tuning in to You"	Nominated	
APAN Star Awards	2022	Drama of the Year	Extraordinary Attorney Woo	Nominated	
APAN Star Awards	2022	Top Excellence Award, Actress in a Miniseries	Park Eun-bin	Nominated	
Baeksang Arts Awards	2023	Grand Prize – Television	Park Eun-bin	Won	
Baeksang Arts Awards	2023	Best Director	Yoo In-shik	Won	
Baeksang Arts Awards	2023	Best Drama	Extraordinary Attorney Woo	Nominated	
Baeksang Arts Awards	2023	Best Actress	Park Eun-bin	Nominated	
Baeksang Arts Awards	2023	Best Supporting Actor	Kang Ki-young	Nominated	
Baeksang Arts Awards	2023	Best New Actor	Joo Jong-hyuk	Nominated	
Baeksang Arts Awards	2023	Best New Actress	Joo Hyun-young	Nominated	
Baeksang Arts Awards	2023	Best New Actress	Ha Yoon-kyung	Nominated	
Baeksang Arts Awards	2023	Best Screenplay	Moon Ji-won	Nominated	
Baeksang Arts Awards	2023	Best Technical Award	Noh Young-sim (Music direction)	Nominated	
Baeksang Arts Awards	2023	Best Technical Award	Hwang Jin-hye (Visual effects)	Nominated	
Busan International Film Festival – Asia Contents Awards & Global OTT Awards	2022	Best Actress	Park Eun-bin	Won	
Busan International Film Festival – Asia Contents Awards & Global OTT Awards	2022	Best Content	Extraordinary Attorney Woo	Won	
Busan International Film Festival – Asia Contents Awards & Global OTT Awards	2022	Best Writer	Moon Ji-won	Nominated	
Content that Changed the World	2022	Content Against Discrimination	Extraordinary Attorney Woo	Won	
Critics Choice Association – Asian Pacific Cinema & Television	2022	Rising Star Award for TV	Park Eun-bin	Won	
Critics' Choice Television Awards	2023	Best Foreign Language Series	Extraordinary Attorney Woo	Nominated	
Dorian Awards	2023	Best Non-English Show	Extraordinary Attorney Woo	Nominated	
International Emmy Awards	2023	Best Drama Series	Extraordinary Attorney Woo	Nominated	
Korea Advertisers Contest	2022	Advertiser's Choice Program Awards	Extraordinary Attorney Woo	Won	
Korea Drama Awards	2022	Best Picture	Extraordinary Attorney Woo	Won	
Korea Drama Awards	2022	Grand Prize (Daesang)	Park Eun-bin	Nominated	
Korea Drama Awards	2022	Global Excellence Award	Kang Ki-young	Nominated	
Kim Soo-hyun Drama Art Hall (Cheongju Cultural Industry Promotion Foundation)	2022	Serial Drama Category – Good Drama of the Year	Extraordinary Attorney Woo	Won	
Kinolights Awards	2022	Korean Drama of the Year	Extraordinary Attorney Woo	Won	
Kinolights Awards	2022	Korean Actress of the Year	Park Eun-bin	Won	
Seoul International Drama Awards	2023	Best Drama	Extraordinary Attorney Woo	Won (Note: Tied with The Glory.)	
Seoul International Drama Awards	2023	Outstanding Asian Star	Park Eun-bin	Won	

=== Listicles ===
Name of publisher, year listed, name of listicle, and placement
Publisher	Year	Listicle	Placement	Ref.
Entertainment Weekly	2025	The 21 best Korean shows on Netflix to watch now	Top 21	

== Adaptations ==
On July 6, 2022, AStory announced that the series would be adapted into a webtoon of the same name. Serialized into sixty episodes, drawn by illustrator HwaUmJo, and written by Yuil, it was planned to be available in Korean, English, Japanese, and Chinese.

On July 14, 2022, it was reported that the possibility of a US remake was being discussed.

On August 17, 2022, it was confirmed that a musical remake was planned in 2024.

On September 6, 2022, it was announced that a remake was being proposed in approximately ten countries.

In 2025, it was reported that Netflix was developing an English-language adaptation of the series by Leila Gerstein, produced by KristieAnne Reed for Jerry Bruckheimer Television.

On 29 June 2026, The Indian remake, Juhi Mui premiered on Colors TV starring Eisha Singh in titular role.

On October 19, 2026, the Japanese version, Extraordinary Attorney Minami, premiered in Japan and globally on Netflix.

The original musical 'Extraordinary Attorney Woo' will be performed from January 17 to February 6, 2027. Live Co., Ltd. and Lotte Cultureworks participated as production companies.
