= Yuko Fueki =

Japanese–Korean actress (born 1979)

Japanese name
- Kanji: 笛木優子
Transcriptions
- Romanization: Fueki Yūko

Korean name
- Hangul: 유민
Transcriptions
- Revised Romanization: Yu Min
- McCune–Reischauer: Yu Min

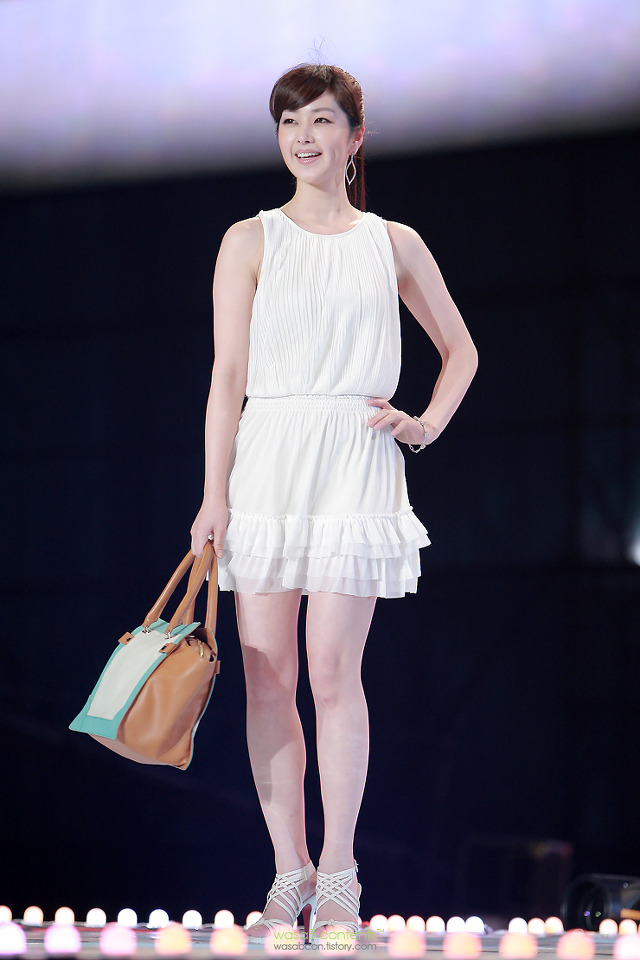
Fueki Yuko (2014)

Yuko Fueki (born June 21, 1979 in Tokyo) is a Japanese actress. She is most popular in South Korea, where she is known as Yoo Min.

Fueki made her feature film debut in the 2001 film Hotaru (Firefly) and, in the same year, her Korean TV debut. She is more popular in South Korea than in Japan. Fueki was the subject of a legal dispute between the Korean company A Stars and the Japanese talent agency Riku Corporation.

In 2005, nude scenes in the movie Sinseolguk (known as Shin Yukiguni in Japan) caused a brief scandal for Fueki, as the Korean release of the movie had followed on the heels of her nude photo shoot just a few months earlier. For a time, the film's website received so many visitors that it briefly crashed.

== Filmography ==
=== Film ===
- Hotaru (ホタル; 2001])
- Shin Yukiguni (新・雪国; 2001)
- Jump (ジャンプ; 2003)
- Blue Swallow (청연; 2005)
- APT (아파트; 2006)
- Meon (憑神; 2007)
- Daichi no Uta (2011)
- Marrying the Mafia IV (2011)
- Marrying the Mafia V (2012)
- Lady in White (2018)
- My Boyfriend in Orange (2022)
- Ito and Her Brothers (2024), Saho Narita

=== Television dramas ===
- Weather Forecaster's Lover (天気予報の恋人; Tenki Yoho no Koibito; 2000, Fuji TV)
- Female announcers (女子アナ。; Joshiana.; 2001, Fuji TV)
- Wuri's Family, aka "My Home" (우리집; Uri Jip; 2001, MBC)
- Let's Get Married (결혼합시다; 2002, KBS)
- All In (올인; 2003, SBS)
- Good Man (좋은사람; Joh-eun Sa-ram; 2003, MBC)
- Abgujeong Jonggajip (압구정 종갓집; 2003-2004, SBS)
- Stained Glass (유리화; Yurihwa; 2004-2005, SBS)
- Bad Housewife, aka "Mr. Housewife" or "Bad Wife" (불량주부; Bul-lyang Joo-boo; 2005, SBS)
- Attention Please (アテンションプリーズ; 2006, Fuji TV)
- Bad Guys (わるいやつら; Warui Yatsura; 2007, TV Asahi)
- Hotelier (ホテリアー; 2007, TV Asahi)
- Iris II: New Generation (아이리스; 2009, KBS)
- Life is Beautiful (SBS 2010)
- Iris 2, as Eriko Sato (2013)
- Kabukimono Keiji (2015)
- My Ex-Boyfriend's Last Will (2022, Fuji TV)
