= Lee Young-yoo =

South Korean actress and singer (born 1998)

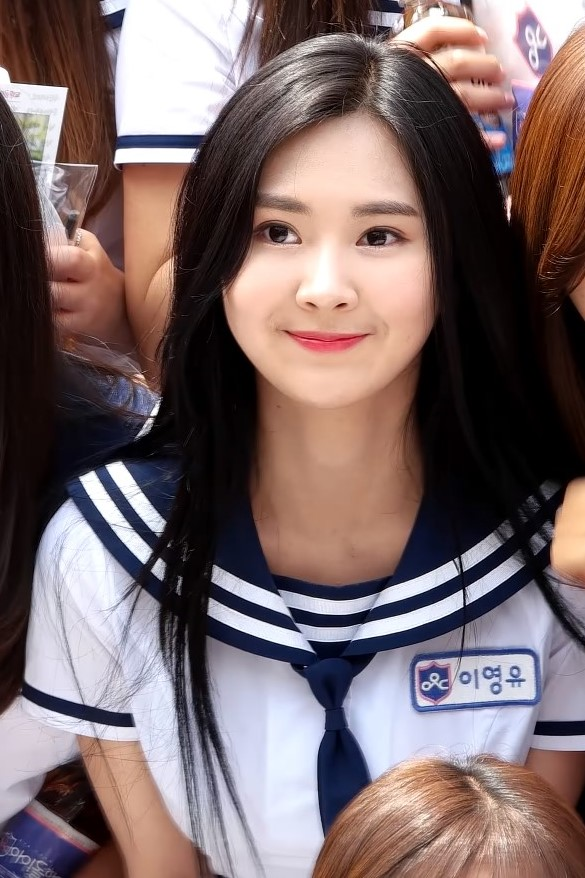
- Lee in July 2017
- Born: July 10, 1998 (age 28); Osaka, Japan
- Occupations: Actress; singer
- Years active: 2003–present
- Agent: Woollim Entertainment

Korean name
- Hangul: 이영유
- RR: I Yeongyu
- MR: I Yŏngyu

Lee Young-yoo (Korean: 이영유; born July 10, 1998) is a South Korean actress and singer. She was born in Osaka, Japan to Korean parents. Lee began her acting career as a child actress in 2003, and among her notable television dramas are Bad Housewife (2005), Bad Family (2006) and The Queen's Classroom (2013). She was also one of the vocalists of the K-pop all-girl children's group 7 Princess from 2004 to 2005; she left the band and released a single as a solo artist in 2008. She graduated from Sewon High School in 2017.

== Filmography ==
=== Television series ===
Year	Title	Role
2003	Open Drama Man and Woman: "Let's Leave This World"	Na-hyun
2004	Sunlight Pours Down	Oh Ye-kang
2004	MBC Best Theater: "Little Angels"	Na-ri
2004	Tropical Nights in December	Min Ji-won
2005	Bad Housewife	Goo Song-yi
2005	Can Love Be Refilled?	Choi Ye-na
2006	Bad Family	Baek Na-rim
2007	MBC Best Theater: "Romance Papa"	Han-kyul
2008	Returned Earthen Bowl	Park Ye-rin
2008	Night After Night	young Heo Cho-hee
2009	Ja Myung Go	young Princess Ja-myung/Puku
2009	Swallow the Sun	young Lee Soo-hyun
2009	Winter Sonata Anime	Jeong Hee-jin (voice)
2010	More Charming by the Day	Han Yoo-na
2013	The Queen's Classroom	Go Na-ri
2013	KBS Drama Special: "Chagall's Birthday"	Yoo-jung
2016	The Love Is Coming	Kim Ah-young

=== Film ===
Year	Title	Role
2007	Herb	Young-ran
2014	Manhole	Kim Song-yi

=== Television show ===
Year	Title	Role	Ref.
2005	23rd MBC Children's Creative Song Festival	Host	
2007	Ppo Ppo Ppo (Kiss Kiss Kiss)	Host	
2008	Infinite Challenge – Children's Song	Judge	
2017	Hip Hop Tribe 2: Game of Thrones	Contestant	
2017	Idol School	Contestant	
2022	King of Mask Singer	Contestant	

=== Music video appearance ===
Year	Song title	Artist
2013	"Green Rain"	Shinee

== Discography ==
Album information	Track listing
Lovely: Single; Released: December 5, 2008; Label: LOEN Entertainment	Track listing: 1. 하얀 세상 (White World); 2. 꼬마 사랑 (Kiddie Love) (feat. Mario)

== Awards and nominations ==
Year	Award	Category	Nominated work	Result
2005	SBS Drama Awards	Best Young Actress	Bad Housewife	Won
2013	MBC Drama Awards	Best Young Actress	The Queen's Classroom	Won
