= Love and Obsession (TV series) =

2009 South Korean television series

- Also known as: The Tale of Janghwa and Hongryeon
- Hangul: 장화홍련
- RR: JanghwaHongryeon
- MR: ChanghwaHongnyŏn
- Genre: Melodrama
- Created by: Go Young-tak
- Written by: Yoon Young-mi
- Directed by: Lee Won-ik
- Starring: Yoon Hae-young; Kim Se-ah; Jang Hyun-sung
- Music by: Choi Chul-ho
- Country of origin: South Korea
- Original language: Korean
- No. of episodes: 150

Production
- Executive producer: Kwak Ki-won
- Producers: Baek Sang-hoon; Lee Jung-mi
- Running time: 30 minutes

Original release
- Network: KBS2
- Release: April 20 – October 10, 2009

Love and Obsession (Korean: 장화홍련) is a South Korean television series that aired on KBS2 from October 20, 2009 to April 23, 2010.

== Cast ==
- Yoon Hae-young as Hong-ryeon
- Kim Se-ah as Yoon Jang-hwa
- Jang Hyun-sung as Kang Tae-yun
- Yeo Woon-kay and Jeon Yang-ja as Mrs. Byun
- Choi Jae-won as Han Soo-chan
- Choi Na-rae as Bang Kong-mi
- Ahn Sun-young as Jin Jung-hae
- Kim Jin-soo as Maeng Hyung-kyu
- Han Tae-soo as Ki Woon-nam
- Kim Yun-tae as Park Suk-doo
- Lee Tae-seung as Lim Hyuk
- Lee Duk-hee as Jang-hwa's mom
- Yoon Ye-hee as Sarah Jang
- Jun Hee-sun as Kong-Mi's daughter
- Heo In-young as Geum Soon-Yi
- Park Sung-kyun as adoption agency interviewer
- Na In-kyu
- Jo In-woo

== Ratings ==
The drama scored 23%, which is the highest number recorded during its broadcast until its end.
