= Choi Dae-hoon =

South Korean actor (born 1980)

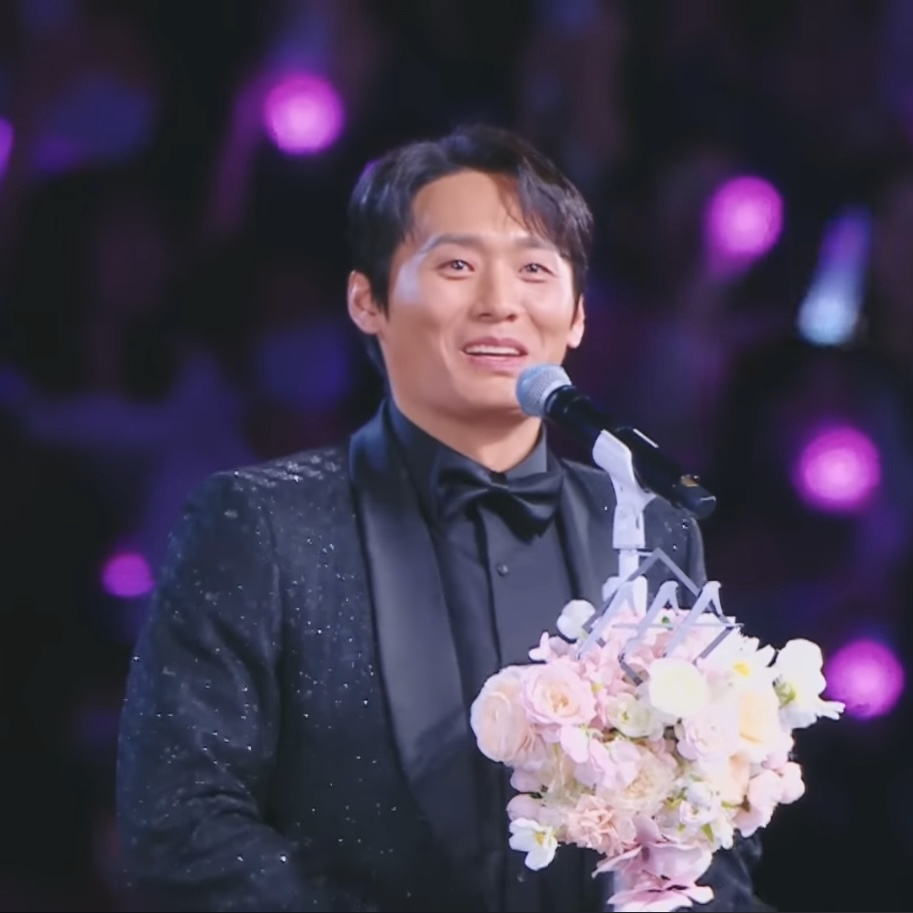
- Choi in 2025
- Born: November 16, 1980 (age 45); South Korea
- Education: Chung-Ang University Theatre department
- Occupation: Actor
- Years active: 2000–present
- Agent: Ace Factory
- Spouse: Jang Yoon-seo (m. 2015)

Korean name
- Hangul: 최대훈
- RR: Choe Daehun
- MR: Ch'oe Taehun

Choi Dae-hoon (Korean: 최대훈; Born November 16, 1980) is a South Korean actor known for his roles in the dramas Beyond Evil (2021), When Life Gives You Tangerines (2025), and Agent Kim Reactivated (2026). He was nominated for Best Supporting Actor – Television at the 57th Baeksang Arts Awards for Beyond Evil and won the same award at the 61st Baeksang Arts Awards for When Life Gives You Tangerines.

== Career ==
=== Beginnings ===
Choi graduated from the Department of Theatre at Chung-Ang University. He made his screen debut in 2002 with the short film In The Jungle (Javan Mackerel), which was screened in Jeonju International Film Festival. Following his debut, he focused primarily on theater and musicals.

In 2007, Choi made his television debut in the KBS2 drama Eolreongttang Detective Agency. He subsequently appeared in several KBS Drama Special.

In 2013, he gained recognition for his roles in popular dramas such as Bridal Mask and Big. He then played a lead role in the tvN drama Crazy Love and appeared in supporting roles in The Queen of Office and the film The Terror Live. In 2014, his notable dramas included KBS Drama Special Season 5 - I'm Dying Soon, You're Only Mine, Hotel King, and Mom's Choice.

In 2015, Choi starred in the SBS daily drama The Return of Hwang Geum-bok and gained significant popularity for his role as Jo Mal-saeng in the historical drama Six Flying Dragons. His character made a memorable entrance in episode 35, helping key figures escape from danger.

In 2016, Choi signed an exclusive contract with Cube Entertainment.

In 2017, he portrayed the elite prosecutor Kim Yoon-soo in the SBS drama Oh, the Mysterious, earning praise for his emotional depth and strong characterization.

=== Breakthrough and critical acclaim ===
On May 10, 2018, Choi signed an exclusive contract with Star Camp 202. He made his appearance in the first episode of the tvN drama Lawless Lawyer as Seok Gwan-dong, the leader of the East Crown gang in Seoul, known for his unconventional approach to justice. In July 2018, he confirmed his role in the SBS drama Heart Surgeons, playing Gu Dong-jun, a character praised for his blend of maturity and charm. Choi also effectively conveyed the character's serious and knowledgeable traits as he developed into a real doctor. His performance was noted for its humor and depth, leading to a nomination for Best Supporting Actor at the 2018 SBS Drama Awards. Choi also returned to the stage that July, portraying Lenny in John Steinbeck's play Of Mice and Men. In August, He also made special appearance in television drama Are You Human?

In 2019, after signing with Ace Factory in March, he appeared in several dramas, including Confession, Nokdu Flower, Everything And Nothing, At Eighteen, and KBS Drama Special - Hidden. He reprised his role as Lenny in John Steinbeck's play Of Mice and Men and received a standing ovation for his performance. At the end of 2019, Choi was cast in Park Ji-eun's drama Crash Landing on You as Yoon Se-jun, the eldest brother of Yoon Se-ri (Son Ye-jin). Despite being the eldest son of a chaebol, he was portrayed as somewhat foolish and sloppy, contrary to his ambitions. Choi expressed the character's personality with a light attitude and quick dialogue.

Choi's versatility as an actor was highlighted in 2020 with his portrayal of Lee Woo-cheol, the composed leader in tvN's Flower of Evil. That year, he also appeared in Extracurricular, Mystic Pop-up Bar, and Do You Like Brahms?.

In 2021, Choi reunited with Director Shim Na-yeon after At Eighteen for the drama Beyond Evil. He played Park Jeong-je, a police officer in the Munju Police Station's investigation support team, a close friend to Lee Dong-sik (Shin Ha-kyun) and the son of Munju City Councilor Do Hae-won (Gil Hae-yeon). His nuanced performance, which captured the character's multifaceted nature, earned him the moniker "new acting monster" and a nomination for Best Supporting Actor – Television at the 57th Baeksang Arts Awards.

In 2022, Choi took on various roles, including Jang Seung-jun in Extraordinary Attorney Woo, Chun Sang-woo in Model Detective 2, Noh Seung-hwan in Insider, and a cameo as a sleep clinic doctor in Park Chan-wook's film Decision to Leave. He also appeared as Seo Min-hyeok in One Dollar Lawyer, prosecutor from a prominent legal family who aims to marry his longtime love, Baek Ma-ri, and expand her family's law firm into "Baek & Seo." Seo, while professionally competent, is depicted as a somewhat impetuous and privileged figure who relies heavily on his father's advice, initially leading viewers to suspect him of being antagonistic towards his former colleague, Cheon Ji-hoon.

In 2025, Choi starred in the Netflix series When Life Gives You Tangerines, directed by Kim Won-seok and written by Lim Sang-choon. His portrayal of the antagonist Bu Sang-gil was well-received, popularizing the catchphrase "Hak-ssi" and earning him the nickname "Mr. Hak-ssi." This performance garnered critical acclaim, resulting in his second nomination and subsequent win for Best Supporting Actor – Television at 61st Baeksang Arts Awards.

== Personal life ==
Choi and actress Jang Yoon-seo married on April 10, 2015, at a chapel in Gangnam, Seoul. The couple met on the set of the 2013 tvN drama Crazy Love. In February 2017, it was reported that they have a ten month old daughter born in 2016.

== Filmography ==
=== Film ===
Feature film appearances
Year	Title	Role	Notes	Ref.
2002	In the Jungle	Jae-gu	Short film/debut	
2004	Superstar Thank You	Pitcher Recruitment Applicant 8		
2006	Forbidden Floor	Brown rice boyfriend	bit	
2006	Metaphor about butterflies	detective	Short film · Lead role	
2013	The Terror Live	Park Jeong-min Investigation Team 1		
2017	Lucid Dream	Detective Kim		
2022	Decision to Leave	sleep clinic doctor		

=== Television series ===
Television series appearances
Year	Title	Role	Notes	Ref.
2007	Eolreongttang Detective Agency	Adidas		
2010	KBS Drama Special - The Great Gye Chun-bin	Jongsoo		
2010	KBS Drama Special - An Awful Lot of Coincidences	Jo Dae-ri		
2011	It Was Good to Love You	Wise friend		
2011	KBS Drama Special - Young-deok Women's Wrestling Team	Manager		
2011	KBS Drama Special - Strawberry Ice Cream	Sangbaek		
2011	KBS Drama Special - Behind the Scenes of the Seokyeong Sports Council Reform	Swimming coach		
2012	Korean Peninsula	Chae Dong-hoon		
2012	Bridal Mask	Lee Hae-seok		
2013	Big	Seo Yoon-jae's fellow doctor		
2013	Crazy Love	Baek Jae-hyuk		
2013	The Queen of Office	Junseok		
2014	KBS Drama Special - I'm Dying Soon	Multi		
2014	You're Only Mine	Kim Tae-soo		
2014	Hotel King	Sung-won (young)		
2014	Mom's Choice	Yoon Yong-seok		
2015	The Return of Hwang Geum-bok	Kim Tae-soo		
2015	Six Flying Dragons	Jo Mal-saeng		
2016	You Are a Gift	Detective Hwang Dae-hoon		
2016	Yeah, That's How It Is	Fund manager		
2017	My Father Is Strange	Lee PD		
2017	Return of the Lucky Pot	Jane		
2017	Oh, the Mysterious	Kim Yoon-soo		
2018	Mother			
2018	Lawless Lawyer	Seokgwan-dong		
2018	Are You Human?			
2018	Heart Surgeons	Dong Dong-jun		
2019	Confession	Hwang Kyo-sik		
2019	Nokdu Flower	Min Young-hwi		
2019	Everything and Nothing	Choi Soo-wan		
2019	At Eighteen	Son Jae-young		
2019	Crash Landing on You	Yoon Se-joon		
2019	KBS Drama Special - Hidden	Kim Hyun		
2020	Extracurricular	Choi Hyun-sung		
2020	Mystic Pop-up Bar	Jang Bok-soo	Special appearance	
2020	Flower of Evil	Lee Woo-cheol		
2020	Do You Like Brahms?	Park Sung-jae		
2021	Beyond Evil	Park Jeong-je		
2021	Racket Boys	Reporter Kim		
2021	You Raise Me Up	Director Jang	Special appearance	
2021	Melancholia	Ryu Sung-jae		
2021	KBS Drama Special — Oddinary			
2022	Insider	Noh Seung-hwan		
2022	Extraordinary Attorney Woo	Jang Seung-jun	Special appearance	
2022	The Good Detective 2	Cheon Sang-woo		
2022	One Dollar Lawyer	Seo Min-hyuk		
2022	Curtain Call	Park Se-gyu		
2024	Captivating the King	Yi Seon		
2025	When Life Gives You Tangerines	Bu Sang-Gil		
2025	Pro Bono	Woo Myung-hoon		
2026	The Wonderfools	Son Kyung-hoon		
2026	Agent Kim Reactivated	Seong Han-su		

=== Television show ===
Television show appearances
Year	Title	Role	Notes	Ref.
2026	The Village Barber	Part-timer	Season 1	

== Stage ==
=== Musical concert ===
Musical concert performances of Choi
Year	Title		Role	Venue	Date	Ref.
Year	English	Korean	Role	Venue	Date	Ref.
1999	Three Pansori by Lim Jin-Taek	임진택의 창작판소리 세 바탕	Solo traveler tourism group	Dongsoong Art Center Dongsoong Hall	December 12 to 23	
2014	Musical Story Show 10th Anniversary with Lee Seok-jun	뮤지컬 이야기쇼 이석준과 함께 10주년	Special appearance	LG Arts Center	May 26	
2015	Hoy! Style Magazine Show	보이스 오브 밀레니엄	Himself (Panelist)	Jangcheon Hall, Gwanglim Art Center	November 30, 2015	

=== Musical play ===
Musical play performances of Choi
Year	Title		Role	Venue	Date	Ref.
Year	English	Korean	Role	Venue	Date	Ref.
2006	The Celestial Watch	천상시계	Jang Young-shil	Towol Theater, Seoul Arts Center	January 31 – February 12, 2006	
2007–2008	Finding Mr. Destiny Season 3	김종욱 찾기 3	Multi-man	JTN Art Hall 1 (Daehakro Arts Plaza Hall 1)	October 23, 2007 – February 17, 2008	
2009	Finding Mr. Destiny Season 4	김종욱 찾기	Multi-man	JTN Art Hall 1 (Daehakro Arts Plaza Hall 1)	April 2009	
2009	Finding Mr. Destiny Season 4	김종욱 찾기	Multi-man	Seongnam Art Centre Ensemble Theatre	November 3 to 22	
2009	Finding Mr. Destiny Season 4	김종욱 찾기	Multi-man	MBC Lotte Art Hall	December 4–6, 2009	
2010	Finding Mr. Destiny Season 5	김종욱 찾기	Multi-man	JTN Art Hall 1 (Daehakro Arts Plaza Hall 1)	Started from July 13, 2010	
2014	The Goddess is Watching	여신님이 보고 계셔 토크콘서트	Lee Chang-seop	Goyang Eoullimnuri Eoullim Theater	November 14–16, 2014	
2015	The Goddess is Watching	여신님이 보고 계셔 토크콘서트	Lee Chang-seop	Busan Cinema Center Sky Theater	December 5–6, 2015	

=== Theater ===
Theater play performances of Choi
Year	Title		Role	Venue	Date	Ref.
Year	English	Korean	Role	Venue	Date	Ref.
2000–2001	Island Baby - Extreme Myth Youth Theater Second Story	섬집아기 - 극단 신화 청소년극장 두번째이야기		Human Small Theater	December 12, 2000 to January 28, 2001	
2002	2002 OFF Daehangno Theater Festival; A Stroll on the Battlefield - Absurd Drama Series #1	(2002) OFF 대학로 연극 페스티벌; 전쟁터의 산책 - 부조리극시리즈	Ensemble cast	Circular Stage Small Theater	May 3 to June 1 (May 5 to 11)	
2003	Medea	메디아	Jae-ppo	National Theater's Sky Theater	June 18 to 20	
2004	3rd Unpaved Theatre Festival: Coat	(제3회) 비포장연극제; 외투		National Theatre Byeoreum Theatre	February 24 to March 2	
2004	Waiting for Godot	고도를 기다리며	Joo-ju	Small theatre festival	August 26 to September 26	
2005	Now	지금		Black Box Theater	August 5 to 21	
2006	Fantasy Fairy Tale	환상동화	War Clown	Sangmyung Art Hall 1 in Daehangno, Seoul	September 14 to October 1.	
2006–2007	Church Brother	교회오빠		Daehangno Art Theater Tree and Water	December to January 14, 2007	
2007	Atami Murder Case	아타미 살인사건	Momotaro	Old Studio 76	January 6, 2007 to February 4, 2008	
2007	Fantasy Fairy Tale	환상동화	War Clown	TOM Theater 2	April 5 to July 1, 2007	
2007	What Incident	어떤 사건	Choi Chang-sik	Old Studio 76	July 31 to August 12	
2008–2009	Fantasy Fairy Tale	환상동화	War Clown	TOM Theater Company Daehangno	April 5 to August 31, 2008	
2009	My First Time	마이 퍼스트 타임	Man one	JTN Art Hall 3	January 3 to May 10, 2009	
2010	Song of the Palace	별궁의 노래	Jwa Ui-jeong	Sowol Art Hall	May 21 to 30	
2011	Dramatic One Night	극적인 하룻밤	Han Jeong-hoon	Harmony Art Hall (Dongseong-ro Theater)	July 13 to September 10, 2011	
2011–2012	Dramatic One Night	극적인 하룻밤	Han Jeong-hoon	Art One Theater 2	July 16, 2011 to May 28, 2012	
2012	Wedding scandal	웨딩 스캔들	Henri	Hakjeon Blue Small Theater	March 1 to July 1, 2012	
2012–2013	Wedding scandal	웨딩 스캔들	Henri	Sangmyung Art Hall 1	August 24, 2012 to February 3, 2013	
2013	Fantasy Fairy Tale	환상동화	War Clown	Art One Theater 3	1 March to May 26, 2013	
2013	Fantasy Fairy Tale	환상동화	War Clown	Daehangno Arts Theater Main Theater	December 6 ton15, 2013	
2013–2014	Almost, Maine	올모스트 메인		Sangmyung Art Hall 1	November 11, 2013 to January 19, 2014	
2014	The Best Play Festival 5 - Pride	연극열전5 - 프라이드	Peter	Art One Theater 2	August 16 to November 9, 2014	
2014–2015	Melodrama	멜로드라마	Kim Chan-il	Seoul Arts Center Free Small Theater	December 31, 2015 to February 15, 2015	
2015	Melodrama	멜로드라마	Kim Chan-il	Seoul Arts Center Opera House Jayu Small Theater	January 26 to February 15, 2015	
2015	Melodrama	멜로드라마	Kim Chan-il	Haneulyeon Theatre, Busan Cinema Centre	April 10 to 11, 2015	
2015	Model Students	모범생들	Jong-tae	Daehakno Free Theatre	May 8 to August 2, 2015	
2015–2016	Kiss of the Spider Woman	거미여인의 키스	Molina	Sinyeon Art Hall (A Art Hall)	November 7, 2015 to January 31, 2016	
2016	Press Release	보도지침	Don Gyeol	Yes24 Stage 3	March 26 to June 12, 2016	
2016	Casa Valentina	까사발렌티나	George/Valentina	Yes24 Stage 2	June 21nto September 11, 2016	
2017	Behemoth	베헤모스	Pyeon	Chungmu Art Center Black Box	February 1 to April 2, 2017	
2018	Of Mice and Men	생쥐와 인간	Lenny	TOM Theater 1	July 24 to October 14, 2018	
2019	Of Mice and Men	생쥐와 인간	Lenny	Uniplex 2	September 24 to November 17, 2019	

== Awards and nominations ==
Award ceremony	Year	Category	Nominated work	Result	Ref.
Asia Artist Awards	2025	Scene Stealer	When Life Gives You Tangerines	Won	
Asia Contents Awards & Global OTT Awards	2025	Best Supporting Actor	When Life Gives You Tangerines	Nominated	
Baeksang Arts Awards	2021	Best Supporting Actor – Television	Beyond Evil	Nominated	
Baeksang Arts Awards	2025	Best Supporting Actor – Television	When Life Gives You Tangerines	Won	
Blue Dragon Series Awards	2025	Best Supporting Actor	When Life Gives You Tangerines	Nominated	
SBS Drama Awards	2018	Best Supporting Actor	Heart Surgeons	Nominated	
