= Bad Housewife =

2005 South Korean comedy-drama TV series

- Also known as: House Husband
- Hangul: 불량주부
- Hanja: 不良主婦
- RR: Bullyangjubu
- MR: Pullyangjubu
- Genre: Comedy drama Family drama
- Screenplay by: Eun-jung Kang; Junseok Seol
- Directed by: Yoo In-sik; Jang Tae-yu
- Starring: Son Chang-min; Shin Ae-ra; Yuko Fueki
- Country of origin: South Korea
- No. of episodes: 18

Production
- Producers: Yoo In-shik; Jang Tae-yoo
- Running time: 70 minutes
- Production company: CK Mediaworks

Original release
- Network: SBS TV
- Release: March 21 – May 17, 2005

Bad Housewife (Korean: 불량주부; RR: Bullyangjubu) is a 2005 Korean drama series, produced and directed by Yoo In-shik and Jang Tae-yoo. The series has Son Chang-min, Shin Ae-ra and Yuko Fueki in leading roles. The show revolves around the lives of Koo Soo-han (Son Chang-min) and Choi Mi-na (Shin Ae-ra), a married couple with a daughter, Song-yi (Lee Young-yoo) and their neighbors and acquaintances. The show regularly made jokes about the stereotypical themes Korean dramas usually have. At the end of each episode there was also a skit called Useful Tips for Everyday Life. The series first aired on March 21, 2005, on SBS.

== Credits ==
=== Cast ===
- Son Chang-min as Koo Soo-han
- Shin Ae-ra as Choi Mi-na
- Kang Jung-hwa as Nam Eun-mi
- Yuko Fueki as Park Yoo-jin
- Ji Sang-ryeol as Kim Suk-joon
- Cho Yeon-woo as Ji Sun-woo
- Lee Young-yoo as Goo Song-yi
- Lee Kyung-sil as Lee Kang-ja
- Kim Sung-kyum as Goo Bon-hwan
- Yeo Woon-kay as No Jin-ye
- Kim Ja-ok as Park Ok-ja
- Song Seung-yong
- Kim Hee-ra
- Kang San

=== Crew ===
- Producers - Yoo In-shik, Jang Tae-yoo
- Assistant producers - Oh Jin-suk, Kwan Hyuk-chan
- Screenwriters - Kang Eun-jung, Sul Joon-suk

== See also ==
- List of South Korean television series
