= Im Seong-jae (actor) =

South Korean actor (born 1987)

- 임성재
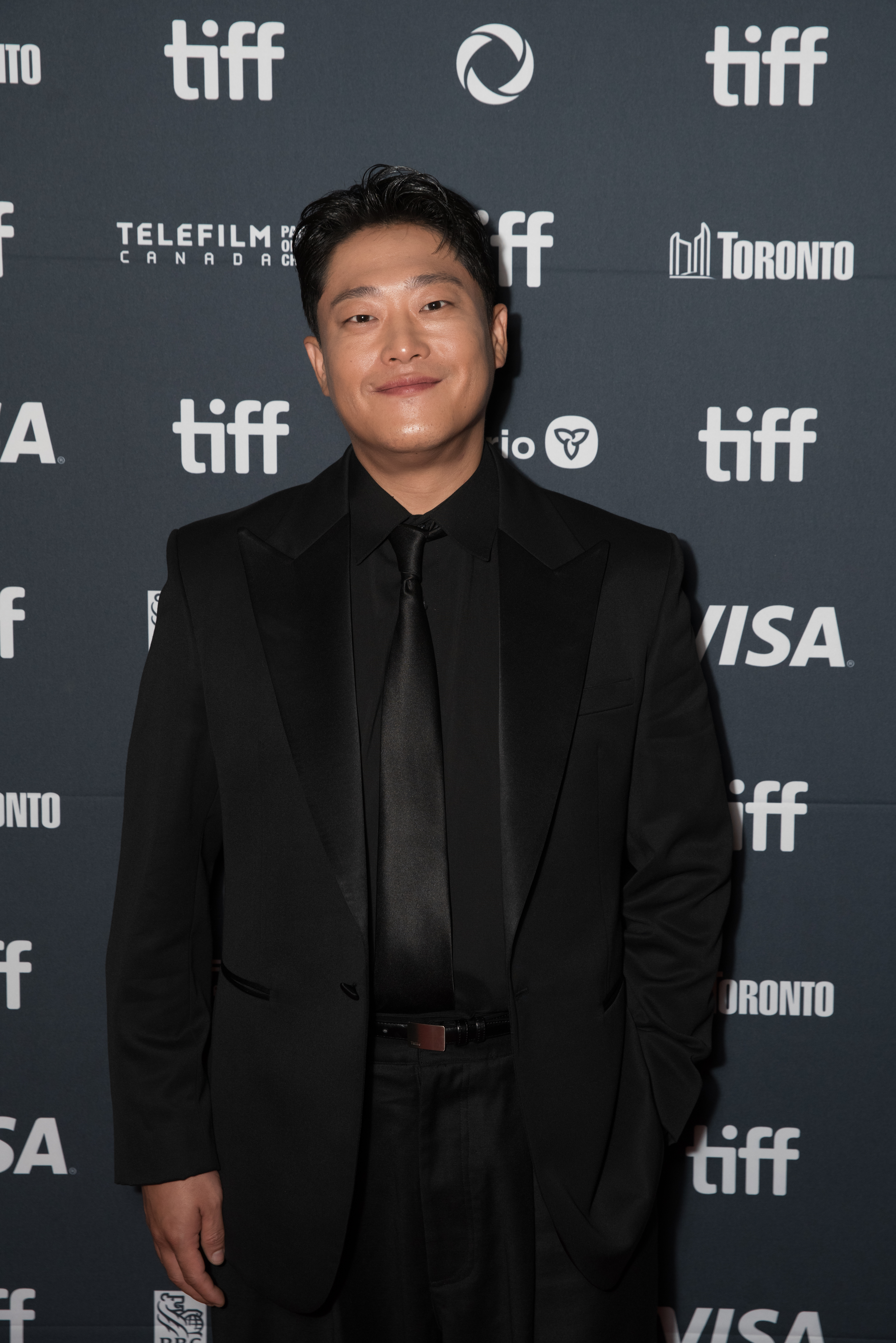
- Im at the 2025 TIFF
- Born: January 18, 1987 (age 39); South Korea
- Occupation: Actor
- Years active: 2018–present
- Agent: SEM Company (2020–present)

Im Seong-jae (Korean: 임성재, born January 18, 1987) is a South Korean actor. He made his screen debut in the 2018 film Sunset in My Hometown, and is best known for his supporting roles in the television series Extraordinary Attorney Woo (2022), The Worst of Evil (2023), and Black Knight (2023).

== Filmography ==
=== Film ===
Year	Title	Role	Notes	Ref.
2016	Unforgettable	Ryong-soo's friend		
2018	Sunset in My Hometown	Seok-gi	Film debut	
2019	The King's Letters	Monk		
2019	Start-Up	Lee Dae-bal		
2019	Daddy's in My Backpack	Boss	Short film	
2020	Gukdo Theater	Choong-koo		
2020	Deliver Us from Evil	Translator		
2020	The Day I Died: Unclosed Case	Officer Kim		
2021	The Book of Fish	Husband from Naju		
2021	New Year Blues	Choi Ma-cho		
2021	Sweet and Sour	Joon-koo		
2021	A Country of Happiness	Dong-ji		
2021	Unframed	Soo-in	Anthology short	
2021	Looking for You	Stationery store owner	Short film	
2021	Apartment	Taxi driver	Short film	
2022	Anchor	Detective Kim		
2022	Emergency Declaration	Jong-soo		
2022	Hunt	North Korean agent		
2022	Confidential Assignment 2: International	Sergeant Kim		
2022	The Policeman's Lineage	Detective Cha		
2023	Target	"That Guy"		
2023	Body.zip	No. 202		
2024	Night Fishing	Police officer (voice)	Short film	
2024	Bogota: City of the Lost	Bong-sik		
2025	Secret: Untold Melody	Go Tae		
2025	Nocturnal	Byung-gyu		
2025	The Ugly	Baek Ju-sang		

=== Television series ===
Year	Title	Role	Notes	Ref.
2018	KBS Drama Special	Tae-min	Episode 7: "Dreamers"	
2019	Welcome 2 Life	Yang Go-woon		
2020	Hyena	Violent client		
2020	Hush	Kang Joo-an		
2021	Vincenzo	Beiru Monk		
2021	Bad and Crazy	President Ma		
2022	Extraordinary Attorney Woo	Kim Min-sik		
2023	Dr. Romantic	Job seeker	Season 3	
2023	Black Knight	Sergeant Lee		
2023	D.P.	Ra Jong-seok	Season 2	
2023	Moving	Bae Min-ki		
2023	The Worst of Evil	Choi Jung-bae		
2024	Hellbound 2	Cheon Se-hyung		
2024	Gangnam B-Side	Sae-gi		
2025	When the Stars Gossip	Jeon Ri-man		
2025	Newtopia	Na In-ho		
2025	Law and the City	Ha Sang-gi		
2026	The Wonderfools	Kang Ro-bin		
