= Yeo Woon-kay =

South Korean actress (1940–2009)

- Born: February 25, 1940; Suwon, Korea, Empire of Japan
- Died: May 22, 2009 (aged 69); Incheon, South Korea
- Education: Korea University
- Occupation: Actress
- Years active: 1958–2009

Korean name
- Hangul: 여운계
- Hanja: 呂運計
- RR: Yeo Ungye
- MR: Yŏ Un'gye

Yeo Woon-kay (Korean: 여운계; February 25, 1940 – May 22, 2009) was a South Korean actress and television personality. She was best known for Korean films such as War of Money, Bad Family and My Lovely Sam Soon.

Yeo began acting while in high school. She continued to act while attending Korea University, where she studied literature. She became known for her work in Daehakgeuk, which is also called the amateur student theater, during the 1950s and 1960s, alongside other contemporary Korean actors like Lee Soon-jae.

She made her professional theater debut with a theater troupe in 1962. From theater, she was able to transition to a successful television career. She often played the role of a grandmother or "grandmotherly figure". Examples of these characters included her roles in Toji in 1986 and Jewel in the Palace in 2003.

Ms. Yeo was diagnosed with kidney cancer in 2007 while shooting the SBS TV series The King and I. But she continued to act and began work on the KBS2 production of Love and Obsession, eventually quitting the production due to pneumonia, indicating the spread of cancer to her lungs.

Yeo entered the hospital intensive care unit in May 2009. Reports say that she fell into a coma and was placed on life support. She died around 8 P.M. on May 22, 2009, at the Incheon Catholic Medical Center in Incheon, South Korea, at the age of 69. Her funeral was held at the Severance Hospital.

Yeo was awarded the Life Achievement Award posthumously at the KBS Drama Awards in 2009.

== Filmography ==
=== Film ===
Year	Title	Role
1972	The Pollen Flower	
1980	Vicious Woman	Mother-in-Law
1980	The Wooden Horse That Went to Sea	
1982	Late Autumn	The Warden
1985	Cabbage in a Pepper Field	
1988	Last Dancing	
1991	The Pinwheel that Spins Alone	Grandmother
1992	From the Seom River to the Sky	Jae-in's Mother
2002	The Beauty in Dream	Grandmother
2005	Mapado	Mrs. Chairman Hoe Jang
2006	Family Matters	
2007	Mapado 2: Back to the Island	Mrs. Chairman Hoe Jang
2007	Sorrow Even Up in Heaven	

=== Television series ===
Year	Title	Role	Network
1983	Eun-ha's Dream		KBS1
1983	Youth March		KBS2
1987	Door of Desires		KBS2
1987	Land	Ham Ahn-daek	KBS1
1988	The Winter That Year Was Warm		KBS2
1991	What's Love?	Jin Soo	MBC
1993	Stormy Season	Choong-in's Mother	MBC
1994	The Moon of Seoul	Sang-gook's Grandmother	MBC
1994	My Son's Woman	Moon Jung-ok	MBC
1995	LA Arirang		SBS
1996	1.5 Generation		MBC
1996	Dad is the Boss		SBS
1997	Because I Love You	Ae-kyung's grandmother	SBS
1998	I Love You, I Love You	Bong-sook's Mother	SBS
1998	The King and the Queen	Former Internal Princess Consort Shin	KBS1
1998	Seven Brides	Na Gap-sun	SBS
1999	Trap of Youth	Yun-hee's Grandmother	SBS
2000	Foolish Love	Sang-woo's mother	KBS2
2000	More Than Words Can Say	Lee Jin-jin	KBS1
2001	Stock Flower		KBS1
2001	I Want To See Your Face	Song Kil-ja	MBC
2001	Like Father, Like Son	Jum Soon	KBS2
2002	Who's My Love?	Duk-bae's wife	KBS2
2002	Golden Wagon	Ahn Gap-jin	MBC
2002	Drama City: "Like Vienna Coffee"		KBS2
2002	Sunrise House	Kim Soon-nyeo	SBS
2003	Drama City: "Chief of Five Zoom"		KBS2
2003	On the Prairie	Charman Shin's Grandmother	KBS2
2003	Swan Lake	Myung Soon-keum	MBC
2003	Jewel in the Palace	Court Lady Jung Mal-geum	MBC
2004	Ms. Kim's Million Dollar Quest	Lee Kkeut-soon	SBS
2004	Oh Feel Young	Chairwoman Shin	KBS2
2005	Bad Housewife	No Jin-ye	SBS
2005	My Lovely Sam Soon	Manager Ms. Oh	MBC
2005	Sisters of the Sea	Cho Han-bin	MBC
2006	Bad Family	Park Bok-nyu	SBS
2006	How Much Love?	Dong-soo's Grandmother	MBC
2006	My Lovely Fool	Dong-joo's Grandmother	SBS
2007	Hello! Miss	Lee Hak	KBS2
2007	War of Money	Madam Bong	SBS
2007	Daughters-in-Law	Suh Ong-sim	KBS2
2007	The King and I		SBS
2008	Why Did You Come to My House?	Gong Ok-ja	SBS
2009	Love and Obsession	Madame Byeon	KBS2
