= Bad Family (TV series) =

South Korean television series

- Also known as: Fake Family Service; Wanted Perfect Family
- Genre: Comedy, Drama
- Written by: Lee Hee-myung; Han Eun-kyung
- Directed by: Yoo In-shik
- Starring: Kim Myung-min; Nam Sang-mi; Im Hyun-sik; Yeo Woon-kay; Kang Nam-gil; Geum Bo-ra; Kim Hee-chul; Lee Young-yoo
- Country of origin: South Korea
- No. of episodes: 16

Production
- Executive producer: Go Heung-shik
- Producers: Bae Tae-sub; Kang Shin-hyo
- Camera setup: Multi-camera
- Running time: 60 minutes Wednesdays and Thursdays at 21:55 (KST)

Original release
- Network: SBS TV
- Release: March 22 – May 11, 2006

Bad Family (Korean: 불량가족; RR: Bullyanggajok) is a South Korean television series starring Kim Myung-min, Nam Sang-mi, Im Hyun-sik, Yeo Woon-kay, Kang Nam-gil, Geum Bo-ra, Kim Hee-chul and Lee Young-yoo. It aired on SBS TV from March 22 to May 11, 2006 on Wednesdays and Thursdays at 21:55 for 16 episodes.

== Plot ==
Baek Na-rim is a nine-year-old girl living happily with her big, extended family. One day, while on their way to a family vacation, Ha In-soo, an unscrupulous businessman that Na-rim's father had cut ties with, desperately tries to flag down their van. But in the process, In-soo accidentally runs their van off the road, causing a car crash. Her entire family dies, and Na-rim is the sole survivor. Grabbing his opportunity, In-soo conceals that he was ever at the scene of the accident.

Traumatized from the accident, Na-rim now suffers from amnesia and speech impairment. Her doctor advises her only remaining relative Byun, an uncle who wasn't with the family at the time of the accident, that she shouldn't be exposed to any more shock and that it would aid in her recovery if she's reminded of her happy memories with her family. So Byun hires Oh Dal-geon, a former small-time gangster who runs an agency that provides fake wedding guests and fake funeral mourners, to create a seven-member "fake family" for Na-rim, exactly the same number of members as her real, deceased one.

Dal-geon auditions and hires six oddball characters, mostly entrepreneurs from the local market who owe him money: "fake grandfather" Jang Hwang-gu is an aging ladies' man and dancing instructor; "fake grandmother" Park Bok-nyeo is a foul-mouthed mandu (dumpling) seller; "fake mother" Uhm Ji-sook is a vain coffee seller (she and Bok-nyeo are longtime mortal enemies); "fake father" Jo Gi-dong is mild-mannered and therefore useless at his job of threatening people over the phone to pay their debts; "fake brother" Gong-min is a homeless youth Dal-geon found wandering the streets; "fake sister" Kim Yang-ah is a tough young woman raising her brothers, whose fishing boat was inadvertently destroyed by Dal-geon; lastly, Dal-geon himself plays the "fake uncle."

Byun installs his niece with the fake family in a nice house, and pays them a salary; in return, every day at a designated time, they must send him a cellphone photo with all family members present.

In the beginning, the fake family members don't get along, and hilarious situations arise as they try to take care of Na-rim while hiding their true identities and relationships. Meanwhile, the market is in crisis as a new supermarket built by In-soo threatens the locals' livelihood.

As their individual backstories are revealed, the family members come to care for each other like a real family. But complications arise when Dal-geon and Yang-ah fall in love, and more dangerously, In-soo would rather that Na-rim never regains her memory.

== Cast ==
- Kim Myung-min as Oh Dal-geon, Na-rim's fake uncle
- Nam Sang-mi as Kim Yang-ah, Na-rim's fake sister
- Im Hyun-sik as Jang Hwang-gu, Na-rim's fake grandfather
- Yeo Woon-kay as Park Bok-nyeo, Na-rim's fake grandmother
- Kang Nam-gil as Jo Gi-dong, Na-rim's fake father
- Geum Bo-ra as Uhm Ji-sook, Na-rim's fake mother
- Kim Hee-chul as Gong-min, Na-rim's fake brother
- Lee Young-yoo as Baek Na-rim
- Kim Kyu-chul as Ha In-soo
- Hyun Young as Ha Boo-kyung, In-soo's niece
- Park Jin-woo as Ha Tae-kyung, In-soo's son
- Yoo Hyung-kwan as Deputy chief Byun, Na-rim's uncle
- Jo Deok-hyun as Dokgo Pa, gangster
- Choi Ha-na as Noh Ah-na
- Han Young-kwang
- Lee Hyun
- Oh Ji-eun

== Ratings ==
Date	Episode	Nationwide	Seoul
March 22, 2006	1	11.4%	12.6%
March 23, 2006	2	14.0%	15.1%
March 29, 2006	3	13.6%	14.3%
March 30, 2006	4	14.9%	14.6%
April 5, 2006	5	14.8%	15.1%
April 6, 2006	6	15.8%	15.5%
April 12, 2006	7	14.8%	15.6%
April 13, 2006	8	17.2%	17.3%
April 19, 2006	9	14.5%	14.5%
April 20, 2006	10	16.3%	16.5%
April 26, 2006	11	15.5%	16.1%
April 27, 2006	12	18.5%	19.1%
May 3, 2006	13	13.9%	13.7%
May 4, 2006	14	15.5%	15.8%
May 10, 2006	15	15.7%	16.4%
May 11, 2006	16	19.2%	19.6%
Average		15.3%	15.7%

Source: TNSMK Korea

== Awards ==
- 2006 SBS Drama Awards: PD Award - Kim Myung-min
