= Yoo In-shik =

South Korean television director (born 1972)

- Born: November 12, 1972 (age 53); South Korea
- Education: Seoul National University (Business Administration)
- Occupation: Television director
- Years active: 1996–present
- Employer: SBS Drama Division (1998-2019)

Korean name
- Hangul: 유인식
- RR: Yu Insik
- MR: Yu Insik

Yoo In-shik (Korean: 유인식; born November 12, 1972) is a South Korean television director known for directing television series such as Dr. Romantic (2016-2023), Vagabond (2019), and Extraordinary Attorney Woo (2022).

== Career ==
Yoo graduated from the Department of Business Administration at Seoul National University. He joined Seoul Broadcasting System (SBS) in 1996 and began his career as an assistant director.

He directed early SBS dramas such as Into the Storm (2004), Bad Family (2006), and Surgeon Bong Dal-hee (2007).

In 2010, Yoo gained recognition for directing the SBS historical drama Giant. He later directed Incarnation of Money (2013), You're All Surrounded (2014), and the police drama Mrs. Cop (2015).

Yoo achieved commercial and critical success with the medical drama Dr. Romantic in 2016, winning Best Director (Television) at the 53rd Baeksang Arts Awards.

In 2019, he directed the espionage action drama Vagabond, starring Lee Seung-gi and Bae Suzy.

Yoo received acclaim for directing Extraordinary Attorney Woo (2022), which became one of the highest-rated dramas in ENA history and earned him another Best Director award at the 59th Baeksang Arts Awards.

== Filmography ==
=== Television series ===
Key
†	Denotes television productions that have not yet been released

Year	Title		Network	Credited as			Ref.
Year	English	Korean	Network	Assistant director	Director	Producer	Ref.
2001	Guardian Angel	수호천사	SBS	Yes	—N/a		
2003	Twenty Years Old	스무살	SBS	—N/a	Yes	—N/a	
2004	Into the Storm	폭풍속으로	SBS	—N/a	Yes	—N/a	
2005	Bad Housewife	불량주부	SBS	—N/a	Yes	—N/a	
2006	Bad Family	불량가족	SBS	—N/a	Yes	—N/a	
2007	Surgeon Bong Dal-hee	외과의사 봉달희	SBS	—N/a	Yes	—N/a	
2008	Robber	불한당	SBS	—N/a	Yes	—N/a	
2010	Giant	자이언트	SBS	—N/a	Yes	—N/a	
2012	History of the Salaryman	샐러리맨 초한지	SBS	—N/a	Yes	—N/a	
2013	Incarnation of Money	돈의 화신	SBS	—N/a	Yes	—N/a	
2014	You're All Surrounded	너희들은 포위됐다	SBS	—N/a	Yes	—N/a	
2015–2016	Mrs. Cop	미세스 캅	SBS	—N/a	Yes	—N/a	
2016–2023	Dr. Romantic	낭만닥터 김사부	SBS	—N/a	Yes	—N/a	
2019	Vagabond	배가본드	SBS	—N/a	Yes	—N/a	
2022	Extraordinary Attorney Woo	이상한 변호사 우영우	ENA	—N/a	Yes	—N/a	
2026	The Wonderfools	더 원더풀스	Netflix	—N/a	Yes	—N/a	
2026	100 Days of Deception	100일의 거짓말	tvN	—N/a	Yes	—N/a	

== Accolades ==
=== Awards and nominations ===
Name of the award ceremony, year presented, category, nominee(s) of the award, and the result of the nomination
Award ceremony	Year	Category	Nominee / Work	Result	Ref.
APAN Star Awards	2022	Best Director	Yoo In-shik	Nominated	
APAN Star Awards	2022	Drama of the Year	Extraordinary Attorney Woo	Nominated	
Baeksang Arts Awards	2017	Best Director (Television)	Dr. Romantic	Won	
Baeksang Arts Awards	2023	Best Director	Yoo In-shik	Won	
Baeksang Arts Awards	2023	Best Drama	Extraordinary Attorney Woo	Nominated	
Busan International Film Festival – Asia Contents Awards & Global OTT Awards	2022	Best Content	Extraordinary Attorney Woo	Won	
Content that Changed the World	2022	Content Against Discrimination	Extraordinary Attorney Woo	Won	
Critics' Choice Television Awards	2023	Best Foreign Language Series	Extraordinary Attorney Woo	Nominated	
Dorian Awards	2023	Best Non-English Show	Extraordinary Attorney Woo	Nominated	
Grimae Awards	2010	Best Director	Giant	Won	
International Emmy Awards	2023	Best Drama Series	Extraordinary Attorney Woo	Nominated	
Korea Advertisers Contest	2022	Advertiser's Choice Program Awards	Extraordinary Attorney Woo	Won	
Korea Drama Awards	2022	Best Picture	Extraordinary Attorney Woo	Won	
Kim Soo-hyun Drama Art Hall (Cheongju Cultural Industry Promotion Foundation)	2022	Serial Drama Category – Good Drama of the Year	Extraordinary Attorney Woo	Won	
Kinolights Awards	2022	Korean Drama of the Year	Extraordinary Attorney Woo	Won	
Seoul International Drama Awards	2023	Best Drama	Extraordinary Attorney Woo	Won (Note: Tied with The Glory.)	

=== State honors ===
State honors
Country	Award Ceremony	Year	Honor	Ref.
South Korea	Korean Content Awards (대한민국 콘텐츠 대상)	2010	Minister of Culture, Sports and Tourism Commendation	
South Korea	Korean Popular Culture and Arts Awards	2023	Presidential Commendation	
