= Kim Se-ah =

South Korean actress (born 1974)

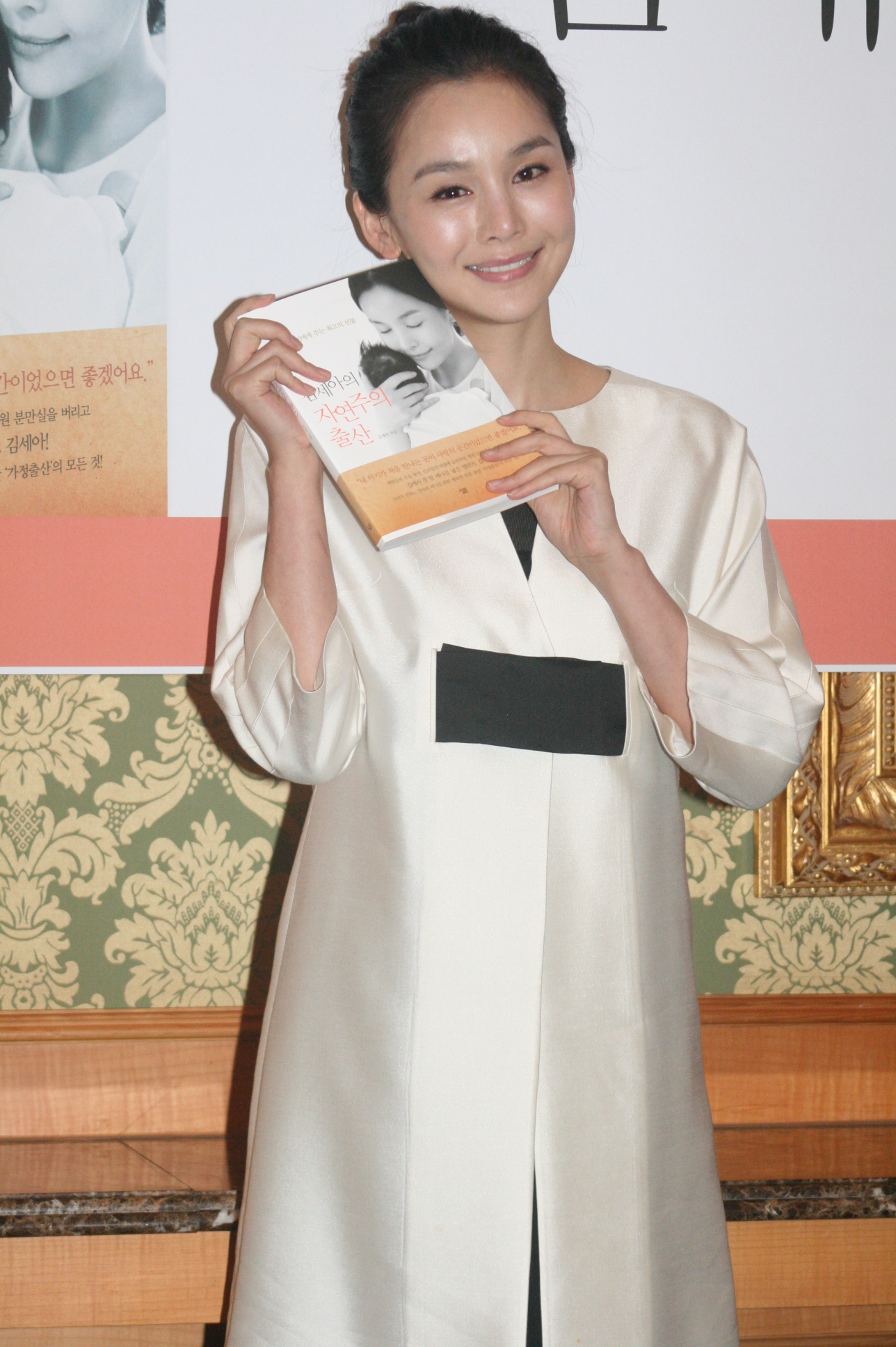
- Kim in 2010
- Born: 18 May 1974 (age 52); Seoul, South Korea
- Other name: Kim Se-a
- Education: Sejong University (Bachelor of Physical Education)
- Occupation: Actress
- Years active: 1996–present
- Agent: Rate Management (Polaris Entertainment)
- Known for: Who Are You: School 2015; Seoul 1945; Janghwa Hongryeon jeon
- Spouse: Kim Kyu-sik (m. 2009)
- Children: 2

Korean name
- Hangul: 김세아
- Hanja: 金世娥
- RR: Gim Sea
- MR: Kim Sea

Kim Se-ah (Korean: 김세아) is a South Korean actress. She is known for roles in dramas such as Seoul 1945, Janghwa Hongryeon jeon and Who Are You: School 2015.

== Personal life ==
She is married to Kim Kyu-sik who is a cellist. They got married in 2009 and have two children, a son and daughter. In 2010, she published a book called The Naturalistic Childbirth of Kim Se-ah.

== Filmography ==
=== Film ===
Year	Title	Role	Ref.
2001	Kiss Me Much	Se-young	
2003	Show Show Show	Suk-ja	

=== Television series ===
Year	Title	Role	Ref.
1996	Power of Love	Kim Sung-hee	
1998	I Only Know Love	Lee-jung	
1998	Woman To Woman	Hyun-eun	
1999	Sweet Bride	Cha Su-a	
2001	Honey Honey	Young-bum's sister	
2002	Loving You	Ahn Mi-mi	
2003	Pretty Woman	Kim Yu-jin	
2004	Stained Glass	Chae Yoon-suh	
2006	Seoul 1945	Jo Yeong-eun	
2009	Love and Obsession	Yoon Jang-hwa	
2015	Who Are You: School 2015	Shin Yi-yeong	
2016	Monster	Mo Kyung-shin	

== Bibliography ==
- The Naturalistic Childbirth of Kim Se-ah
