= OSEN (newspaper) =

South Korean newspaper

OSEN is a South Korean Korean-language online sports and entertainment news website. It began as a sister outlet of Money Today.

The CEO is Kim Young-min, and the editor is Son Nam-won.
