= Djamilya Abdullaeva =

South Korean Film Actress and model

- Born: December 14, 1984 (age 41); Tashkent, Uzbek SSR, Soviet Union
- Occupations: Actress, model
- Years active: 2007–present
- Height: 174 cm (5 ft 9 in)
- Musical career
- Genres: Pop
- Instrument: Vocals
- Label: Warner Music Korea

Djamilya Abdullaeva (Uzbek: Jamila Abdullayeva, Russian: Джамиля Абдуллаева, Korean: 자밀라 압둘라예바, born December 14, 1984) is an Uzbek model, actress, and singer in South Korea. Djamilya began her career as a model in the early 2000s, gaining attention through media appearances on the Korean television. She has appeared as an actor in various films, TV and reality shows on Korean broadcasting networks, and also as a singer with her debut 2008 single, I Hate You, Oppa (오빠 미워), a remake of the Croatian pop song Amore Mio.

== Career ==
Born in Tashkent, Uzbekistan, Djamilya began her modeling career with Figaro Model Management, claiming first runner-up in 2004 at the Miss Hyundai Department Store Competition held in Tashkent.

In 2007 she switched agencies, signing with Hanmaroo Model Management, and relocating to South Korea where she gained prominence through her appearances on KBS World Channel's Global Talk Show (Misuda), a talk show featuring interviews with foreign-born women, as well as through her role in a TV commercial for a water park in Gyeongju.

From 2007 to 2014, Djamilya appeared on various KBS talk shows and reality shows, including Korea's Dancing with the Stars, and at sporting events like the 2008 XTM Billiards Championship, where she appeared in a celebrity exhibition match. She also threw the first pitch at the opening game of the 2008 Korea Professional Baseball season at Incheon Munhak Stadium.

Djamilya made her acting debut in a 2008 episode of the KBS2 series Unstoppable Marriage, and later that year she starred in the TV movie Sexi Mong Returns, a sequel to the CGV miniseries Sexi Mong.

Djamilya also began a musical career in 2008, debuting with her song I Hate You, Oppa as a digital single released by Vitamin Entertainment.

In 2009, Djamilya made an appearance in the South Korean online game The King.

Djamilya has continued to model, featuring in underwear and lingerie advertisements as recently as 2012, and has done extensive work in most of Asia's major markets, including Malaysia, Tokyo, Seoul, Hong Kong, Taipei, and India.

== Media Appearances ==
=== TV shows ===
Year	Title	Role	Ref.
2007	Global Talk Show Misuda	MC Nam Hee-suk	
2008	X-boyfriend season2	MC Shin Dong-wook	
2008	Stars dogs	MC Lee Hwi-jae, Hyun Young	
2009	Unstoppable Marriage	Kim Soo-mi, Kim Dong-wook	
2014	Happy Together	MC Yoo Jae-Seok	

=== Reality Shows ===
Year	Title	Role	Ref.
2008	Legally Blonde (Korean TV program)	Herself	
2008	Dancing with the Stars	Joo Jong-hyuk Lee Ji-ae Lee Pa-ni	

=== TV Movie ===
Year	Title	Role	Network	Ref.
2008	Sexy Mong Returns	Seo Young	CGV	

=== Video games ===
Year	Title	Role	Notes	Ref.
2009	The King	Herself	South Korean KTH game. All-Star Game portal	

=== Advertisement ===
Year	Title	Role	Notes	Ref.
2009	California Beach Gyeongju World	Herself	Water park in Gyeongju, South Korea	

=== Music ===
Year	Song title	Album	Network	Ref.
2008	I Hate You Oppa	Single	Mnet	

=== Music video ===
Year	Song title	Artist	Network	Ref.
2008	I Hate You Oppa	Herself	Mnet	
