= Kim Sun-young (actress, born 1980) =

South Korean actress (born 1980)

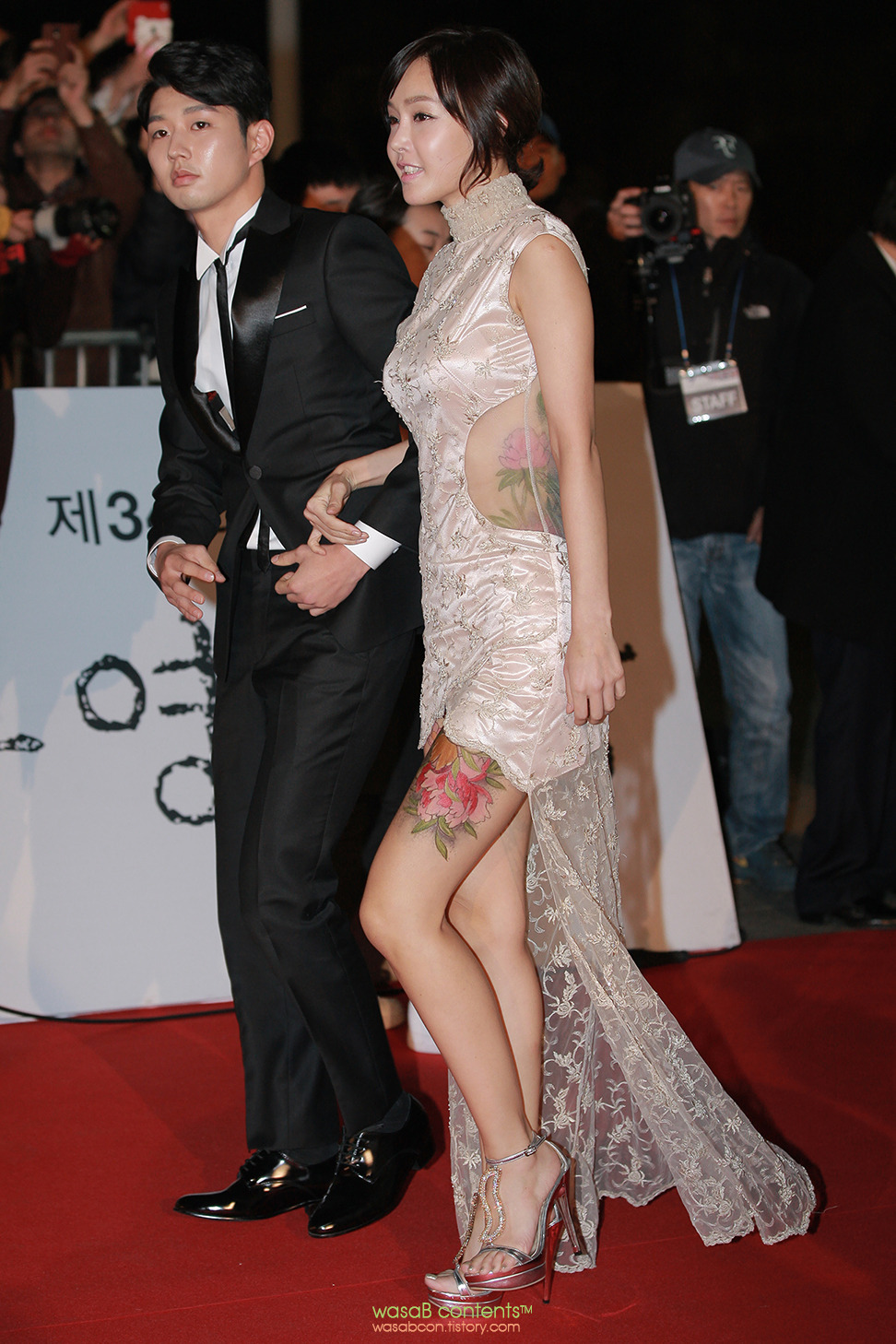
- Kim in 2013
- Born: April 17, 1980 (age 46); Busan, South Korea
- Occupation: Actress
- Years active: 1999–present
- Agent: Histar Entertainment

Korean name
- Hangul: 김선영
- RR: Gim Seonyeong
- MR: Kim Sŏnyŏng

Kim Sun-young (Korean: 김선영; born April 17, 1980) is a South Korean actress and singer best known for her roles in the Korean films The Chaser, Love Lesson, Toxic Desire: Addiction, and Female War: A Nasty Deal.

== Filmography ==
=== Film ===
- Daddy's Back (2016)
- Female War: Lousy Deal (2014)
- Toxic Desire: Addiction (2014)
- Love Lesson (2013)
- Secret Travel (2013)
- Bang Ja Chronicles (2010)
- Where is Jung Seung Phil (2009)
- 4 Days (2008)
- What Happened Last Night? (2008)
- The Good, the Bad, the Weird (2008)
- Manner of Battle (2008)
- A Different Kind of Life (2008)
- The Chaser (2008)
- About Love (2004)
- My Father is a Spy (2002)
- Amanita Muscaria (1999)

=== Television ===
- Come Back Mister (SBS, 2016)
- God's Gift: 14 Days (SBS, 2014)
- The Person I Love (SBS, 2007)
- Company Love (OCN, 2007)
- Sexi Mong (CGV, 2007)
- Hyena (tvN, 2006)
- Dream of Salmon (KBS2, 2006)
- Toji, the Land (SBS, 2004)
- Three Friends (MBC, 2000)
