= Dr. Romantic =

South Korean television series

- Promotional poster for season three
- Also known as: Romantic Doctor Teacher Kim
- Hangul: 낭만닥터 김사부
- Hanja: 浪漫닥터 金師父
- Lit.: Romantic Doctor, Teacher Kim
- RR: Nangmandakteo Gimsabu
- MR: Nangmandakt'ŏ Kimsabu
- Genre: Romance; Medical; Melodrama
- Written by: Kang Eun-kyung (season 1–3); Lim Hye-min (season 3)
- Directed by: Yoo In-shik (season 1–3); Park Soo-jin (season 1); Lee Gil-bok (season 2); Kang Bo-seung (season 3)
- Starring: Han Suk-kyu; Yoo Yeon-seok; Seo Hyun-jin; Ahn Hyo-seop; Lee Sung-kyung; Kim Joo-hun
- Music by: Jeon Chang-yeop
- Country of origin: South Korea
- Original language: Korean
- No. of seasons: 3
- No. of episodes: 52 + 2 special

Production
- Executive producers: Han Jung-hwan (season 1); Sung Hye-Jin (season 2); Park Young-soo (season 3)
- Producers: Park Hyun-ji (season 1); Ahn Jae-hyun (season 2); Shin Sang-yoon (season 2)
- Cinematography: Lee Gil-bok; Song Yo-hoon
- Editors: Jo In-hyung; Lim Ho-cheol
- Running time: 60 minutes (season 1); 63–90 minutes (season 2); 70 minutes (season 3)
- Production companies: Samhwa Networks; Studio S (season 3)
- Budget: ₩6.783 billion (S1); ₩13.28 billion (S2); ₩28.8 billion (S3)

Original release
- Network: SBS TV
- Release: November 7, 2016 – June 17, 2023

Dr. Romantic (Korean: 낭만닥터 김사부) is a South Korean television series starring Han Suk-kyu in the title role, alongside Yoo Yeon-seok and Seo Hyun-jin in the first season, Ahn Hyo-seop, Lee Sung-kyung and Kim Joo-hun in the second and third season. The first season aired on SBS TV from November 7, 2016, to January 16, 2017, every Monday and Tuesday at 22:00 (KST) for 20 episodes. The second season aired on SBS TV from January 6 to February 25, 2020, every Monday and Tuesday at 21:40 (KST) time slot for 16 episodes. The third season aired on SBS TV from April 28 to June 17, 2023, every Friday and Saturday at 22:00 (KST) time slot for 16 episodes. It is also available for streaming on Viu for the first and second seasons and Disney+ for the third season in selected regions.

The first season received positive reception, recording over 20% in ratings. In addition, it also received positive reviews for its plot and Han Suk-kyu's performance.

== Series overview ==
Season	Episodes		Originally released		Time slot	Avg. viewership (millions)
Season	Episodes		First released	Last released	Time slot	Avg. viewership (millions)
1	21	20	November 7, 2016	January 16, 2017	Monday–Tuesday at 22:00 (KST)	N/A
1	21	Special	January 17, 2017		Tuesday at 22:00 (KST)	N/A
2	17	Special	December 30, 2019		Monday at 21:40 (KST)	1.032
2	17	16	January 6, 2020	February 25, 2020	Monday–Tuesday at 21:40 (KST)	3.809
3	16		April 28, 2023	June 18, 2023	Friday–Saturday at 22:00 (KST)	2.545

== Synopsis ==
=== Season 1 ===
A story about Boo Yong-joo (Han Suk-kyu), a triple-board certified surgeon, who was once at the top of his field and used to work at Seoul's top medical center, Geosan University Hospital. After a traumatic incident, he disappears and changes his name to Kim Sa-bu. He begins working at a small hospital named Doldam, located in Gangwon Province. He guides Kang Dong-joo (Yoo Yeon-seok) and Yoon Seo-jeong (Seo Hyun-jin), both who were transferred from Geosan University Hospital 5 years apart, to become great doctors by teaching them to fight against power and money for the sake of patients.

=== Season 2 ===
Three years following the events of the first season, Kim Sa-bu visits Geosan University Hospital to recruit a general surgeon. He finds Seo Woo-jin (Ahn Hyo-seop), a doctor with a troubled past who is ostracized by his fellow doctors and offers him the job. In the meantime, Cha Eun-jae (Lee Sung-kyung) is suspended after making another mistake in the operation room and has no other choice but to follow the two doctors to Doldam Hospital. A doctor named Park Min-gook (Kim Joo-hun) saw this but was traumatized after seeing Kim Sa-bu again. They both got into a bus accident and saw Sa-bu risking his life helping an injured lady. He became the new director of Doldam only for him to be betrayed by his own team from Geosan. So, he ended up supporting Doldam and thus stayed there permanently. In the end of the series the Doldam Hospital Foundation has been formed separate from the Geosan Hospital Foundation with Boo Yong-joo as a chairman of the foundation.

=== Season 3 ===
Three years following the events of the second season, the Doldam Hospital Regional Trauma Center, Kim Sa-bu's long-held dream, is set to be opened. With the opening of the Regional Trauma Center, the scale of incidents and accidents that Doldam Hospital has to deal with also increases. The events will also feature Kang Dong-joo's (Yoo Yeon-seok) return as Chief of Trauma Department, as well as the rivalry between Kim Sa-bu and Dr. Cha Jin-nam, who happens to be Cha Eun-jae's estranged father.

== Cast ==
=== Character appearances ===
Character	Portrayed by	Season		
Character	Portrayed by	1	2	3
Main
Kim Sa-bu (Teacher Kim) / Boo Yong-joo	Han Suk-kyu	Main	Main	Main
Kang Dong-joo	Yoo Yeon-seok	Main	—N/a	Guest
Yoon Seo-jung	Seo Hyun-jin	Main	—N/a	Stand-in
Seo Woo-jin	Ahn Hyo-seop	—N/a	Main	Main
Cha Eun-jae	Lee Sung-kyung	—N/a	Main	Main
Park Min-gook	Kim Joo-hun	—N/a	Main	Main
Supporting
Yeo Woon-young	Kim Hong-pa	Recurring	Recurring	N/A
Oh Myung-sim	Jin Kyung	Recurring	Recurring	Recurring
Jang Gi-tae	Im Won-hee	Recurring	Recurring	Recurring
Nam Do-il	Byun Woo-min	Recurring	Recurring	Recurring
Jeong In-soo	Yoon Na-moo	Recurring	Recurring	Recurring
Park Eun-tak	Kim Min-jae	Recurring	Recurring	Recurring
Do Yoon-wan	Choi Jin-ho	Recurring	Recurring	—N/a
Song Hyun-cheol	Jang Hyuk-jin	Recurring	Recurring	—N/a
Do In-bum	Yang Se-jong	Recurring	Guest	—N/a
Chairman Shin	Joo Hyun	Recurring	—N/a	—N/a
Woo Yeon-hwa	Seo Eun-soo	Recurring	—N/a	—N/a
Chairman Shin's assistant	Seo Young	Recurring	Recurring	—N/a
Bae Moon-jeong	Shin Dong-wook	—N/a	Recurring	Recurring
Yoon Ah-reum	So Joo-yeon	—N/a	Recurring	Recurring
Uhm Hyun-jung	Jung Ji-ahn	—N/a	Recurring	Recurring
Joo Young-mi	Yoon Bo-ra	—N/a	Recurring	Recurring
Yang Ho-joon	Go Sang-ho	—N/a	Recurring	Recurring
Shim Hye-jin	Park Hyo-joo	—N/a	Recurring	Guest
Jang Dong-hwa	Lee Shin-young	—N/a	N/A	Recurring
Lee Sun-woong	Lee Hong-nae	—N/a	N/A	Recurring
Cha Jin-man	Lee Geung-young	—N/a	N/A	Recurring
Minor
Mr. Gu	Lee Gyu-ho	Guest	Guest	Guest
Chief Lee	Kim Yong-jin	Guest	Guest	Guest
Heo Yeong-gyoo	Bae Myung-jin	Guest	Guest	—N/a

=== Main ===
- Han Suk-kyu as Kim Sa-bu (Teacher Kim) / Boo Yong-joo

His real name is Boo Yong-joo, but he uses the name Kim Sa-bu. He is the only surgeon in South Korea who achieved triple-board certification in general surgery, cardiac surgery and neurosurgery. After the death of his protege at Geosan University Hospital, he isolates himself and decides never to retake any protege. He later moved to Doldam Hospital to become the Chief Surgeon there. In season two, Doldam Hospital is in need of a general surgeon, he visits Geosan University Hospital in Seoul to recruit one and quickly became interested in Seo Woo-jin and Cha Eun-jae. After learning about their skills and struggles with other doctors, he decides to recruit them. He strives hard to make the Doldam Hospital a centre for trauma patients, which he considers "a collective dream of Doldam Staff", where treatment is given to patients in dire need regardless of their class, nationality and status. In the end of season 2, he became the chairman of the newly formed Doldam Hospital Foundation.

- Yoo Yeon-seok as Kang Dong-joo
  - Yoon Chan-young as young Kang Dong-joo

A GS (General Surgery) specialist. Intelligent and armed with excellent skills, his desire to succeed is driven due to an incident that happened to him in his childhood in which his father died at the hands of neglectful doctors. He later went on to become a skilled surgeon but his opportunities were held back due to his poor family background and lack of contacts. He gets transferred to Doldam Hospital after a failed surgery on a VIP, which later proved to be an opportunity for him to exhibit his skills.

- Seo Hyun-jin as Yoon Seo-jung
  - Shin Yi-joon as young Yoon Seo-jung

Initially, she wants to become a doctor due to her strong desire to be recognized and appreciated by President Do who is more like a father figure to her and took up her responsibility as her guardian. When Kang Dong Joo admits his feelings to her, she gets momentarily swayed and remembers his confession continuously during a car drive with her fiancé which leads to a car accident in which she survives and her fiancé dies she feels guilty and furthermore disappears from Geosan University Hospital. Yoon Seo-Jung is injured while trekking; she is rescued and treated by Kim Sa-bu whom she treats and respects as her teacher and mentor. Although she is saved and recovers, she suffers from PTSD due to the past accident and stays in Doldam Hospital for good. But then later on she decides to continue being a doctor at Doldam Hospital. Originally ER certified, she later strives hard to get certified in CS too after once observing Teacher Kim operating on a patient and from then dreams of a single opportunity to enter his OR and assist him, which she considers a very rare opportunity for a doctor.

- Ahn Hyo-seop as Seo Woo-jin

A second-year GS fellow. He's a victim of "Familial Suicide" and the only survivor. He desires to live a decent life and thus goes on to become a doctor but is continuously tormented by his colleagues and seniors due to him being labeled as a whistleblower after testifying against his senior and later gets suspended because of rumors about his part-time jobs he does to pay off his private loan he took to get into medical school. In need of a GS, Kim Sa-bu offers him the position of residency at Doldam Hospital but in reality, it was Seo Woo-Jin's professor and Teacher Kim's senior who informs Kim Sa-bu about Seo Woo Jin's exemplary skills as a surgeon but his lack of opportunities. Initially because of the dire need for money, he accepts Teacher Kim's job offer but in the long run and his constant association with Kim Sa-bu, he realizes his worth as a doctor and the profession and starts admiring Teacher Kim who is the only one who was considerate to him when the whole world stood against him. He has been in love with Eun-jae since medical school but has kept it a secret.

- Lee Sung-kyung as Cha Eun-jae

A second-year CS fellow. She was a top student at medical school, often in competition with Woo-jin with whom she had a complicated relationship. Due to her anxiety issues, she is unable to perform surgeries without vomiting or taking pills that induce sleep. When every doctor refuses to train her, Kim Sa-bu takes it upon himself to guide her, unknown to her. She is thus transferred to work for Doldam Hospital where she's headed to become an excellent surgeon by Teacher Kim by overcoming her anxiety issues before she is called back to the main hospital by her professor. By then she realizes her love for Woo-Jin and decides to stay back in Doldam Hospital for good.

- Kim Joo-hun as Park Min-gook

A professor of general surgery who later on became the new director of Doldam Hospital. He once escaped from a bus that was under accident in which Teacher Kim was also traveling and risked his life to save an unconscious person. He somehow starts feeling insecure and doubts Teacher Kim's principles and intentions and challenges him in every aspect after Teacher Kim corrects him during live surgery in the main hospital performed by himself while Teacher Kim never doubts his ability or integrity as a doctor. He became the new chairman of Doldam only for him to be betrayed by his own team from Geosan. He later realizes and overcomes his insecurities and thus supports Teacher Kim in achieving his dream by the end of Season 2.

=== Supporting ===
People of Doldam Hospital

- Kim Hong-pa as Yeo Woon-young

An internal medicine specialist and director of Doldam Hospital. A proud doctor who lost his motivation after the death of his wife. In Season 2, he was dismissed by Do Yoon-wan as the director of Doldam Hospital.

- Jin Kyung as Oh Myung-sim

Head nurse. A woman with strong will, who is able to stand up to Kim Sa-bu. She seems strict, but has a warm heart and cares about her patients.

- Im Won-hee as Jang Gi-tae

Manager of Doldam Hospital. He is known to be an opportunist and always want the best for the hospital, trying to find ways to promote it in any way he can.

- Byun Woo-min as Nam Do-il

A freelance anesthesiologist. He usually runs a restaurant, but due to his average cooking skills, his only customers are usually Doldam doctors.

- Kim Min-jae as Park Eun-tak

A nurse, now nurse practitioner at Doldam Hospital. He harbors a crush on Yoon Ah-reum. He first met Teacher Kim after being admitted as a patient. It was a life-changing encounter as he then decided to go to nursing school and eventually started working at Doldam Hospital himself.

- Seo Eun-soo as Woo Yeon-hwa

A staff member who likes Dong-joo. Later, she comes back as a doctor at Doldam Hospital.

- Lee Gyu-ho as Mr. Gu

An orderly who also serves as guard when there are agitated patients or people at the hospital.

- Shin Dong-wook as Bae Moon-jeong "Dr. Bones"

An orthopedic surgery specialist. He was Woo-jin's and Eun-jae's senior at medical school and started working at Doldam Hospital a month prior to his juniors' arrival.

- So Joo-yeon as Yoon Ah-reum

A fourth-year emergency medicine resident. She has a bright personality and applied to Doldam Hospital after seeing Teacher Kim help patients in the emergency room of Geosan University Hospital.

- Yoon Na-moo as Jeong In-soo

An emergency medicine specialist. He is the only doctor who stayed at Doldam among the few who were forced to leave Geosan University Hospital for the branch, back in 2016.

- Jung Ji-ahn as Uhm Hyun-jung

An emergency room nurse.

- Yoon Bo-ra as Joo Young-mi

An emergency room nurse. She recently started working at Doldam Hospital.

- Kim Yong-jin as Chief Lee

Chief of Administration at Doldam Hospital.

- Lee Shin-young as Jang Dong-hwa

The youngest doctor in Doldam Hospital, which characterizes the MZ generation seeking an independent lifestyle while studying for their third year as a GS. Later on, it was revealed that he's the younger brother of Jang Hyun-joo, Kim Sa-bu's late medical student patient who was the first person to refer him as Teacher Kim back in the days.

- Lee Hong-nae as Lee Sun-woong

A first-year thoracic surgery fellow who has full of spirit and passion, in which he is a former military doctor.

- Lee Geung-young as Cha Jin-man

A thoracic surgery specialist. He was a former rival of Kim Sa-bu and Eun-jae's father.

People of Geosan University Hospital

- Yang Se-jong as Do In-bum

Yoon-wan's son. He went to the same college and was in the same class as Dong-joo. He wants to be acknowledged by his father and feels inferior to Dong-joo who has excellent skills without a good background. He also harbors a crush on Seo-jung. In the end, he supports Doldam until his successful return. At the start of season 2, it was revealed that he successfully returned to Geosan University Hospital. However, in the 14th episode, he revisited Doldam to investigate a "death in the table" case. Afterward, he was about to leave when Woo-jin convince him to stay and gives him tips and advice. He, therefore, accepts the request and does daily routines and an operation. It is unknown whether he will return in the 3rd season.

- Choi Jin-ho as Do Yoon-wan

Director of Geosan University Hospital. In Season 2, he became the Chairman of Geosan University Foundation following the death of Shin Myung-ho. Though he is not outstanding as a doctor, his political skills are recognized and he intends to use them to shape Doldam Hospital the way he envisions it.

- Jang Hyuk-jin as Song Hyun-cheol

Chief of Surgery at Geosan University Hospital. He is from a poor family and has a strong desire for success.

- Joo Hyun as Chairman Shin

Owner of Jungsun Casino and the hidden Chairman of Geosan Foundation.

Park Min-gook's staff

- Go Sang-ho as Yang Ho-joon

A third-year general surgery fellow. He is surgeon's assistant to Park Min-gook. Though Ho-joon fears him, his loyalty to Min-gook led him to follow the doctor to Doldam Hospital.

- Park Hyo-joo as Shim Hye-jin

A professor of anesthesiology at Geosan University Hospital. She is an authoritative but kind woman who experienced death and suffering in her life.

- Bae Myung-jin as Heo Yeong-gyoo

A nurse at Geosan University Hospital.

=== Others ===
Season 1
- Seo Young as Chairman Shin's assistant
- Kim Ji-eun as Yoon-wan's secretary
- Park Min-jung as Min-jung
- Kim Bo-jung as a nurse
- Lee Chae-eun as a nurse
- Jin Ah-rin
- Lee Yong-yi as a mother of a patient (Ep. 3)
- Ri Min as a truck driver (Ep. 4)
- Lee Jin-kwon
- Ko Jin-ho
- Lee Cheol-min as Kang Seung-ho (Ep. 7–8)
- Lee Myung-haeng as a psychotherapist (Ep. 8–9)
- Shin Seung-hwan as a webtoon writer and patient at Doldam hospital (Ep. 9–10)
- Park Seung-tae as a patient (Ep. 10)
- Kim Joon-won as Inspector Choi
- Kim Dan-woo as Inspector Choi's daughter
- Shin Yeon-suk
- Lee Kang-uk as a patient and driver who caused a six-fold collision by drunk driving
- Lee Jae-wook
- Heo Joon-seok
- Kang Eui-sik as Park Joo-hyuk, the runaway soldier
- Han Kab-soo as Park Joo-hyuk's father
- Son Yeong-Soon as a patient's wife
- Park Yeong-soo as the general manager of the Disease Control Center Department
- Park Doo-shik as Soo-jung's boyfriend (Ep. 13–14)
- Lee Jin-kwon as Supporting
- Jo I-hyun as a patient
- Jeon Min-seo
- Jung Soo-hwan as a high school student
- Kim Se-joon as a paramedic transferring patients to Doldam Hospital
- Kim Min-sang as Reporter Oh Sung-jae (Ep. 16–17)
- Lee Jae-woo as Ahn woo-yeol (Ep. 16–17)
- Kim Ji-eun as President Do Yoon-wan's secretary
- Lee Jung-sung
Season 2
- Lee Ho-cheol as loan shark
- Lim Cheol-soo as loan shark
- Kim Jong-tae as Professor Oh

A professor of cardiothoracic surgery at Geosan University Hospital.

- Kang Yoo-seok as Joon Young

A prisoner and patient.

- Kim Jin as Choi Soon-young

A paramedic and organ donor.

- Lee Ji-hyun as Soon-young's mother
- Ji Hye-won as Seo Se-young

A nurse intern.

- Kwon Hyeok-soo as Mr. Ryu

Minister of National Defense.

- Kim Dong-hyun as a violent husband
Season 3
- Ha Dong-joon as Kang Sung-jin, coast guard (Ep.1)
- Kwon Hyeok-soo as Ryu Woon-gil

Minister of National Defense.

- Oh Min-ae as Ko Kyung-sook

A member of Provincial.

- Woo Ji-hyun as Jeon Kyung-soo

A hiker.

- Lee Ji-ha as Cha Eun-jae's mother
- Kim Cheol-yun as North Korean defector (Ep.1-2)
- Seo Dong-hyun
- Jung Han-seol as Jo Seong-yoon (Ep.3-4)

A national ski jumping player, who undergoes surgery in his legs and stomach after being injured during training.

=== Special appearances ===
Season 1
- Tae In-ho as Dr. Moon Tae-hwa, Yoon Seo-jung's boyfriend. He died due to brain hemorrhage after a car accident. (Ep. 1–2)
- Moon Ji-in as a doctor and Yoon Seo-jung's friend (Ep. 1)
- Hwang Chan-sung as Young Gyun (Ep. 8, 11–12)
- Kim Jung-young as Dong-joo's mom
- Kim Hye-eun as Shin Hyun-jung (Ep. 14–18)
- Kim Hye-soo as Dr. Lee Young-jo (Ep. 20–21)
Season 2
- Joo Hyun as Shin Myung-ho (Ep. 1)
- Son Sang-yeon as Kang Ik-joon (Ep. 11-14)
- Kang Hyung-suk as Kang Ik-joon's brother (Ep. 14)
- Yang Se-jong as Do In-beom (Ep 10, 14–15)
- Jung Hyeon-jun as Lee Dong-woo's son (Ep. 13)
- Jeong Bo-seok as Bae Moon-jeong's father (Ep. 15–16)
- Seo Young as Manager Joo (Ep. 15–16)
- Kim Hye-eun as Shin Hyun-jung (Ep. 16)
Season 3
- Ha Yoon-kyung as herself, an interviewee for new doctors at Doldam Hospital (Ep. 2)
- Joo Hyun-young as interviewee (Ep. 2)
- Joo Jong-hyuk as interviewee (Ep. 2)
- Im Seong-jae as interviewee (Ep. 2)
- Moon Sang-hoon as interviewee (Ep. 2)
- Ryu Seung-soo as the national ski jumping team coach (Ep. 3)
- Yoo Yeon-seok as Kang Dong-joo (Ep. 12–16)
- Park Hyo-joo as Shim Hye-jin (Ep. 15–16)
- Kim Hye-jun as Jang Hyun-joo (Ep.16)

== Production ==
=== Season 1 ===
First script reading took place September 13, 2016, at SBS Ilsan Production Studios in Goyang, South Korea. Filming started on September 23.

=== Season 2 ===
The first script reading took place in September 2019 at SBS Ilsan Production Studios in Goyang, South Korea.

Han Suk-kyu, Kim Hong-pa, Jin Kyung, Im Won-hee, Byun Woo-min, Kim Min-jae, Choi Jin-ho, Jang Hyuk-jin, Yang Se-jong, Lee Gyu-ho and Yoon Na-moo reprised their roles from the first season.

=== Season 3 ===
In September 2021, it was reported that production for Season 3 would begin in late 2021, but filming had to be postponed due to the actor's schedule and the outbreak of the COVID-19 virus. Season 3 is scheduled to be filmed with the goal of broadcasting in the first half of 2023.

Han Suk-kyu, Ahn Hyo-seop, Lee Sung-kyung, Byun Woo-min, Jung Ji-an, Im Won-hee, Jin Kyung, So Joo-yeon, Yoon Na-moo, Kim Min-jae, Shin Dong-wook, Yoon Bo-ra, Lee Shin-young and Lee Hong-nae has confirmed the casting for season 3.

== Original soundtrack ==
=== Season 1 ===
Original soundtrack for Season 1

Dr. Romantic (Original Television Soundtrack)

Soundtrack album by Various artists
- Released: January 18, 2017
- Length: 68:02
- Languages: Korean; English
- Labels: Kakao Entertainment; Samhwa Networks

Released on January 18, 2017
No.	Title	Artist	Length
1.	"Romantic Doctor" (Opening Title)	Jeon Chang-yeop; An Soo-wan	2:03
2.	"Always Okay" (언제나 괜찮아)	Shin Yong-jae (4Men)	4:10
3.	"Walking, Walking (New ver.)" (걷고, 걷고 (New Ver.))	Jeon In-kwon	5:12
4.	"Because It's you" (그대라서)	Lee Hyun	4:28
5.	"Forever Love"	Haebin (Gugudan)	3:34
6.	"Mellow (Drama ver.)"	Daybreak	3:34
7.	"Today was better than yesterday" (오늘은 어제보다 괜찮았지)	Lee Seok-hoon	4:28
8.	"In Place" (제자리)	Young Man	3:16
9.	"Western Humanism"	Jeon Chang-yeop; Cho Nam-wook	3:51
10.	"Lie"	Jeon Chang-yeop; Gu Ja-wan	4:16
11.	"Rocking Hotshot"	Jin Myung-yong	1:49
12.	"Fresh Morning"	Jeon Chang-yeop; Mamagorilla	2:53
13.	"I am Not"	Jeon Chang-yeop; Gu Ja-wan	3:18
14.	"Doctor Blues"	Jeon Chang-yeop; Jo Nam-wook	2:51
15.	"Time of Wrath"	Jeon Chang-yeop; Mamagorilla	2:26
16.	"Little More Cheer Up"	Jin Myung-yong	2:54
17.	"Tension Around"	Jeon Chang-yeop; Gu Ja-wan	2:14
18.	"I Miss You"	Jeon Chang-yeop; An Soo-wan	3:05
19.	"Met You Again"	Jeon Chang-yeop; Jo Nam-wook	2:01
20.	"Hope of Hospital"	Jeon Chang-yeop; An Soo-wan	3:31
21.	"Doctor Kim Sa-boo" (Ending Title)	Jeon Chang-yeop; Mamagorilla	2:08
Total length:			68:02

=== Season 2 ===
Original soundtrack for Season 2

Dr. Romantic 2 (Original Television Soundtrack)

Soundtrack album by Various artists
- Released: February 25, 2020
- Length: 76:42
- Languages: Korean; English
- Labels: Kakao Entertainment; Yum Yum Entertainment

Released on February 25, 2020
No.	Title	Artist	Length
1.	"My Love" (너를 사랑하고 있어)	Baekhyun (Exo)	3:15
2.	"Your Day" (너의 하루는 좀 어때)	Gummy	3:31
3.	"Go Away Go Away"	Chanyeol (Exo); Punch	3:50
4.	"That's All" (다 그렇지 뭐)	Heize	3:10
5.	"Love" (사랑 이토록 어려운 말)	Yang Da-il	3:47
6.	"I Miss You" (자꾸 더 보고싶은 사람)	Mamamoo	4:26
7.	"You Don't Know" (모르시죠)	Monday Kiz	3:36
8.	"My Love" (나의 그대)	Chungha	3:36
9.	"Dr.Romantic 2" (Opening Title)	Jeon Chang-yeop; Ahn Soo-wan	2:05
10.	"Emergency"	Jeon Chang-yeop; Mamagorilla	1:02
11.	"Western Lonely"	Jeon Chang-yeop; Jo Nam-wook	2:20
12.	"Lie Two"	Jeon Chang-yeop; Gu Ja-wan	4:48
13.	"Have Breakdown"	Jeon Chang-yeop; An Soo-wan	3:07
14.	"Love & Hatred"	Jeon Chang-yeop; Mamagorilla	3:59
15.	"Tension Observe"	Jeon Chang-yeop; Mamagorilla	3:18
16.	"Hope of Patient"	Jeon Chang-yeop; An Soo-wan	3:54
17.	"Wonder Dolbam Hospital"	Jeon Chang-yeop; Jo Nam-wook	3:13
18.	"Sentimental Memory"	Jeon Chang-yeop; An Soo-wan	4:41
19.	"Tension Around Two"	Jeon Chang-yeop; Gu Ja-wan	3:29
20.	"Colour of Night"	Jeon Chang-yeop; Jo Nam-wook	4:17
21.	"Trumpet West"	Jeon Chang-yeop; Jo Nam-wook	2:51
22.	"Doctor Kim Sa-boo 2" (Ending Title)	Jeon Chang-yeop; Mamagorilla	4:27
Total length:			76:42

=== Season 3 ===
Original soundtrack for Season 3

Released on June 19, 2023
No.	Title	Artist	Length
1.	"Hello"	Baekhyun (Exo)	3:50
2.	"I Will Stay With You"	Gummy	3:27
3.	"Beautiful Day"	Doyoung (NCT)	3:26
4.	"Still You"	Seungkwan (Seventeen)	3:50
5.	"One Hundred Love"	Lia (ITZY)	3:56
6.	"I Promise"	Lee Juck	4:53
7.	"More Than Yesterday"	Seo Da-hyun (tripleS)	3:30
8.	"Irreplaceable"	Rose, FLORA	3:10
9.	"Day By Day"	Lee Won Seok	3:35
10.	"Thank You for the Memories"	Doldams	3:30

== Viewership ==
Dr. Romantic : South Korea viewers per episode (millions)

Season	Episode number																				Average
Season	1	2	3	4	5	6	7	8	9	10	11	12	13	14	15	16	17	18	19	20	Average
1	N/A	N/A	N/A	N/A	N/A	N/A	N/A	N/A	N/A	N/A	N/A	N/A	N/A	N/A	N/A	N/A	N/A	N/A	N/A	N/A	N/A
2	2.665	3.331	3.327	3.563	3.328	3.275	3.517	4.054	3.467	3.916	3.950	4.193	4.208	4.346	4.588	5.210	–				3.809
3	2.388	2.634	2.744	2.481	2.569	2.509	2.709	2.656	2.686	2.785	2.553	2.912	2.868	2.868	2.795	3.423	–				2.545

Source: Audience measurement performed nationwide by Nielsen Korea.

Average TV viewership ratings (season 1)
Ep.	Original broadcast date	Average audience share		
Ep.	Original broadcast date	Nielsen Korea		TNmS
Ep.	Original broadcast date	Nationwide	Seoul	Nationwide
1	November 7, 2016	9.5% (7th)	10.5% (6th)	9.5% (12th)
2	November 8, 2016	10.8% (6th)	11.7% (5th)	8.7% (14th)
3	November 14, 2016	12.4% (6th)	13.2% (4th)	12.5% (5th)
4	November 15, 2016	13.8% (4th)	14.9% (4th)	13.1% (5th)
5	November 21, 2016	16.5% (4th)	17.9% (2nd)	15.2% (4th)
6	November 22, 2016	18.9% (3rd)	20.3% (2nd)	17.4% (4th)
7	November 28, 2016	18.8% (2nd)	20.4% (1st)	16.5% (4th)
8	November 29, 2016	21.7% (1st)	23.3% (1st)	19.5% (2nd)
9	December 5, 2016	20.4% (2nd)	22.3% (1st)	18.8% (2nd)
10	December 6, 2016	22.8% (1st)	24.7% (1st)	20.9% (2nd)
11	December 12, 2016	21.6% (1st)	23.0% (1st)	20.0% (2nd)
12	December 13, 2016	23.8% (1st)	25.8% (1st)	21.6% (2nd)
13	December 19, 2016	22.6% (1st)	24.8% (1st)	19.7% (2nd)
14	December 20, 2016	22.9% (1st)	24.6% (1st)	21.6% (2nd)
15	December 27, 2016	23.7% (1st)	25.6% (1st)	20.6% (2nd)
16	January 2, 2017	22.1% (2nd)	23.2% (1st)	19.5% (3rd)
17	January 3, 2017	25.1% (1st)	26.9% (1st)	21.9% (2nd)
18	January 9, 2017	26.0% (1st)	27.9% (1st)	23.4% (2nd)
19	January 10, 2017	26.7% (1st)	28.9% (1st)	22.2% (2nd)
20	January 16, 2017	27.6% (1st)	29.0% (1st)	24.7% (2nd)
Average		20.4%	21.9%	18.4%
Special	January 17, 2017	27.0% (1st)	28.7% (1st)	23.1% (2nd)
In the table above, the blue numbers represent the lowest ratings and the red numbers represent the highest ratings.

Average TV viewership ratings (season 2)
Ep.	Part	Original broadcast date	Average audience share		
Ep.	Part	Original broadcast date	Nielsen Korea		TNmS
Ep.	Part	Original broadcast date	Nationwide	Seoul	Nationwide
1	1	January 6, 2020	10.8% (5th)	11.4% (5th)	10.2% (8th)
1	2	January 6, 2020	14.9% (3rd)	15.5% (2nd)	13.3% (4th)
2	1	January 7, 2020	13.2% (3rd)	14.3% (3rd)	12.6% (5th)
2	2	January 7, 2020	18.0% (2nd)	19.3% (1st)	17.0% (3rd)
3	1	January 13, 2020	11.3% (5th)	11.8% (4th)	11.4% (7th)
3	2	January 13, 2020	17.2% (2nd)	17.7% (2nd)	16.6% (3rd)
4	1	January 14, 2020	15.4% (3rd)	15.8% (3rd)	14.4% (4th)
4	2	January 14, 2020	19.9% (1st)	20.6% (1st)	18.2% (2nd)
5	1	January 20, 2020	14.8% (3rd)	15.1% (3rd)	13.7% (4th)
5	2	January 20, 2020	17.6% (2nd)	18.0% (1st)	17.1% (3rd)
6	1	January 21, 2020	15.5% (3rd)	15.9% (3rd)	15.1% (4th)
6	2	January 21, 2020	18.6% (2nd)	18.9% (1st)	18.2% (2nd)
7	1	January 27, 2020	13.0% (5th)	13.7% (3rd)	11.8% (6th)
7	2	January 27, 2020	18.0% (2nd)	18.3% (2nd)	16.8% (2nd)
8	1	January 28, 2020	16.5% (3rd)	17.0% (3rd)	15.8% (4th)
8	2	January 28, 2020	20.7% (1st)	20.9% (1st)	19.5% (2nd)
9	1	February 3, 2020	14.4% (4th)	15.3% (3rd)	14.9% (5th)
9	2	February 3, 2020	18.2% (2nd)	18.5% (2nd)	18.0% (3rd)
10	1	February 4, 2020	17.7% (3rd)	18.5% (3rd)	16.7% (4th)
10	2	February 4, 2020	20.8% (2nd)	21.8% (1st)	19.3% (2nd)
11	1	February 10, 2020	17.7% (3rd)	18.9% (3rd)	16.7% (4th)
11	2	February 10, 2020	20.8% (2nd)	21.5% (1st)	18.6% (3rd)
12	1	February 11, 2020	17.4% (3rd)	17.8% (3rd)	16.4% (4th)
12	2	February 11, 2020	21.9% (1st)	22.1% (1st)	18.8% (2nd)
13	1	February 17, 2020	18.0% (3rd)	19.3% (3rd)	16.6% (4th)
13	2	February 17, 2020	22.7% (1st)	23.9% (1st)	19.0% (3rd)
14	1	February 18, 2020	19.3% (3rd)	20.2% (2nd)	18.2% (4th)
14	2	February 18, 2020	23.4% (1st)	23.8% (1st)	21.6% (2nd)
15	1	February 24, 2020	19.4% (3rd)	20.8% (2nd)	18.5% (4th)
15	2	February 24, 2020	23.7% (1st)	24.5% (1st)	22.2% (2nd)
16	1	February 25, 2020	21.1% (4th)	21.9% (3rd)	20.6% (5th)
16	2	February 25, 2020	25.4% (2nd)	25.6% (2nd)	23.1% (3rd)
16	3	February 25, 2020	27.1% (1st)	27.2% (1st)	24.4% (1st)
Average			18.3%	19.0%	17.1%
Special	1	December 30, 2019	5.6% (18th)	5.5% (20th)	5.4% (20th)
Special	2	December 30, 2019	7.6% (11th)	7.9% (9th)	6.9% (16th)
Special	3	December 30, 2019	5.3% (20th)	5.6% (17th)	4.4% (NR)
In the table above, the blue numbers represent the lowest ratings and the red numbers represent the highest ratings.; NR denotes that the drama did not rank in the top 20 daily programs.

Average TV viewership ratings (season 3)
Ep.	Original broadcast date	Average audience share		
Ep.	Original broadcast date	Nielsen Korea		TNmS
Ep.	Original broadcast date	Nationwide	Seoul	Nationwide
1	April 28, 2023	12.7% (1st)	13.1% (1st)	10.2% (3rd)
2	April 29, 2023	13.8% (2nd)	14.3% (2nd)	11.2% (2nd)
3	May 5, 2023	13.5% (1st)	13.7% (1st)	10.7% (3rd)
4	May 6, 2023	12.3% (2nd)	12.1% (2nd)	N/A
5	May 12, 2023	13.4% (1st)	13.5% (1st)	10.0% (3rd)
6	May 13, 2023	12.0% (2nd)	11.3% (2nd)	9.7% (2nd)
7	May 19, 2023	13.8% (1st)	14.2% (1st)	10.2% (3rd)
8	May 20, 2023	12.9% (2nd)	13.1% (2nd)	10.3% (2nd)
9	May 26, 2023	13.4% (1st)	13.5% (1st)	10.6% (2nd)
10	May 27, 2023	13.5% (2nd)	13.4% (2nd)	N/A
11	June 2, 2023	13.4% (1st)	13.8% (1st)	11.4% (3rd)
12	June 3, 2023	14.4% (2nd)	14.2% (2nd)	N/A
13	June 9, 2023	14.8% (1st)	15.1% (1st)	11.0% (3rd)
14	June 10, 2023	14.9% (2nd)	14.8% (2nd)	N/A
15	June 16, 2023	14.0% (1st)	14.3% (1st)	N/A
16	June 17, 2023	16.8% (2nd)	16.8% (1st)	12.4% (2nd)
Average		13.7%	13.8%	10.7% (Note: This average rating is calculated based on the published ratings. The exact average rating is unknown due to multiple unpublished ratings.)
In the table above, the blue numbers represent the lowest ratings and the red numbers represent the highest ratings.; N/A denotes that the rating were not published.

== Awards and nominations ==
Name of the award ceremony, year presented, category, nominee of the award, and the result of the nomination
Award ceremony	Year	Category	Nominee / Work	Result	Ref.
ABU Prizes	2017	Grand Prize (Daesang)	Dr. Romantic	Won	
APAN Star Awards	2021	Best OST	"My Love" (Baekhyun)	Nominated	
APAN Star Awards	2021	Best New actor	Ahn Hyo-seop	Nominated	
APAN Star Awards	2023	Top Excellence Award	Lee Sung-kyung	Won	
APAN Star Awards	2023	Seoul League Actors Award	Lee Sung-kyung	Won	
Art Awards	2020	Best Viewership Ratings	Dr. Romantic 2	Won	
Asia Artist Awards	2020	AAA Best Actor	Ahn Hyo-seop	Won	
Asia Artist Awards	2020	AAA Best Actress	Lee Sung-kyung	Won	
Asian Television Awards	2017	Best Drama Series	Dr. Romantic	Nominated	
Baeksang Arts Awards	2017	Best Drama	Dr. Romantic	Nominated	
Baeksang Arts Awards	2017	Best Director (TV)	Yoo In-sik	Won	
Baeksang Arts Awards	2017	Best Actor (TV)	Han Suk-kyu	Nominated	
Baeksang Arts Awards	2017	Best Screenplay (TV)	Kang Eun-kyung	Nominated	
Baeksang Arts Awards	2017	Best New Actor (TV)	Kim Min-jae	Nominated	
Baeksang Arts Awards	2020	Best New Actor (TV)	Ahn Hyo-seop	Won	
Korea Drama Awards	2017	Grand Prize (Daesang)	Han Suk-kyu	Nominated	
Korea Drama Awards	2023	Best Supporting Actress	So Joo-yeon	Won	
SBS Drama Awards	2016	Grand Prize (Daesang)	Han Suk-kyu	Won	
SBS Drama Awards	2016	Excellence Award, Actor in a Genre Drama	Yoo Yeon-seok	Won	
SBS Drama Awards	2016	Excellence Award, Actress in a Genre Drama	Seo Hyun-jin	Won	
SBS Drama Awards	2016	Best Couple	Yoo Yeon-seok and Seo Hyun-jin	Won	
SBS Drama Awards	2016	Top 10 Stars	Han Suk-kyu	Won	
SBS Drama Awards	2016	Top 10 Stars	Seo Hyun-jin	Won	
SBS Drama Awards	2016	New Star Award	Kim Min-jae	Won	
SBS Drama Awards	2016	Idol Academy Award – Best Kiss	Yoo Yeon-seok and Seo Hyun-jin	Won	
SBS Drama Awards	2016	Grand Prize (Daesang)	Seo Hyun-jin	Nominated	
SBS Drama Awards	2016	Top Excellence Award, Actor in a Genre & Fantasy Drama	Han Suk-kyu	Nominated	
SBS Drama Awards	2016	Excellence Award, Actress in a Genre Drama	Jin Kyung	Nominated	
SBS Drama Awards	2016	Special Award, Actor in a Genre Drama	Im Won-hee	Nominated	
SBS Drama Awards	2020	Excellence Award, Actor in a Miniseries Genre/Action Drama	Ahn Hyo-seop	Won	
SBS Drama Awards	2020	Excellence Award, Actress in a Miniseries Genre/Action Drama	Lee Sung-kyung	Won	
SBS Drama Awards	2020	Best Supporting Actor	Kim Joo-hun	Won	
SBS Drama Awards	2020	Best Supporting Actress	Jin Kyung	Won	
SBS Drama Awards	2020	Best New Actress	So Joo-yeon	Won	
SBS Drama Awards	2020	Grand Prize (Daesang)	Han Suk-kyu	Nominated	
SBS Drama Awards	2020	Top Excellence Award, Actor in a Miniseries Genre/Action Drama	Han Suk-kyu	Nominated	
SBS Drama Awards	2020	Best Supporting Team	Dr. Romantic 2	Nominated	
SBS Drama Awards	2020	Best Couple Award	Lee Sung-kyung and Ahn Hyo-seop	Nominated	
SBS Drama Awards	2023	Grand Prize (Daesang)	Han Suk-kyu	Nominated	
SBS Drama Awards	2023	Best New Actor	Lee Shin-young	Won	
SBS Drama Awards	2023	Best New Actor	Lee Hong-nae	Won	
SBS Drama Awards	2023	Best Young Actor	Han Ji-an	Won	
SBS Drama Awards	2023	Scene Stealer Award	Go Sang-ho	Won	
SBS Drama Awards	2023	Scene Stealer Award	Byun Jung-hee	Won	
SBS Drama Awards	2023	Top Excellence Award, Actor in a Seasonal Drama	Ahn Hyo-seop	Won	
SBS Drama Awards	2023	Top Excellence Award, Actress in a Seasonal Drama	Lee Sung-kyung	Won	
SBS Drama Awards	2023	Best Supporting Team	Dr. Romantic 3	Won	
SBS Drama Awards	2023	Best Couple Award	Ahn Hyo-seop and Lee Sung-kyung	Nominated	
SBS Drama Awards	2023	Best Young Actress	Lee Ga-yeon	Nominated	
SBS Drama Awards	2023	Best Supporting Actor in a Seasonal Drama	Yoon Na-moo	Nominated	
SBS Drama Awards	2023	Excellence Award, Actress in a Seasonal Drama	So Joo-yeon	Nominated	
SBS Drama Awards	2023	Excellence Award, Actor in a Seasonal Drama	Kim Min-jae	Nominated	
SBS Drama Awards	2023	Best Supporting Actress in a Seasonal Drama	Jin Kyung	Nominated	
SBS Drama Awards	2023	Best Supporting Actress in a Seasonal Drama	Jung Ji-ahn	Nominated	
