= Big Mouth (South Korean TV series) =

2022 South Korean television series

- Promotional poster
- Also known as: Big Mouse (Note: "Big Mouth" and "Big Mouse" are both written as 빅마우스 in Korean.)
- Hangul: 빅마우스
- RR: Bingmauseu
- MR: Pingmausŭ
- Genre: Hardboiled; Noir; Legal; Crime
- Created by: Jang Young-chul; Jung Kyung-soon
- Developed by: Kim Ho-jun (planning)
- Written by: Kim Ha-ram
- Directed by: Oh Chung-hwan; Bae Hyun-jin
- Starring: Lee Jong-suk; Im Yoon-ah; Kim Joo-hun
- Music by: Park Se-joon
- Country of origin: South Korea
- Original language: Korean
- No. of episodes: 16

Production
- Executive producer: Ahn In-yong
- Producers: Lee Sang-baek; Kim Young-gyu
- Production companies: AStory; Studio Dragon; A-Man Project
- Budget: ₩30 billion

Original release
- Network: MBC TV
- Release: July 29 – September 17, 2022

Big Mouth (Korean: 빅마우스) is a 2022 South Korean television series starring Lee Jong-suk, Im Yoon-ah, and Kim Joo-hun. It aired on MBC TV from July 29 to September 17, 2022. It is also available for streaming on Disney+ in selected regions.

== Synopsis ==
The series follows an underperforming lawyer caught in a murder case. To survive and protect his family, he uncovers a conspiracy among the upper classes.

== Cast ==
=== Main ===
- Lee Jong-suk as Park Chang-ho

A third-rate lawyer with a ten percent success rate, called "Big Mouth" by his legal acquaintances due to his tendency to speak before acting. His life is suddenly in danger when he is mistaken for a genius conman known as "Big Mouse".

- Im Yoon-ah as Ko Mi-ho

Chang-ho's supportive wife who is a nurse and has a bold personality but succumbs to cancer.

- Kim Joo-hun as Choi Do-ha

The ambitious mayor of Gucheon, whose goal in life is to become the most dignified president.

=== Supporting ===
==== NR Forum ====
- Yang Kyung-won as Gong Ji-hoon

The president of the media conglomerate Gukdong Daily and the chairman of the NR Forum.

- Kim Jung-hyun as Jung Chae-bong

The director of Chilbong Academy.

- Lee Yoo-joon as Han Jae-ho

A surgeon.

- Oh Ryung as Lee Du-geun

Legal counsel of NR Forum.

- Yoon Seok-hyun as Cha Seung-tae

Managing director of OC Group.

- Park Hoon as Seo Jae-yong

Head of the Department of Internal Medicine, Hematology and Oncology at Gucheon University Hospital.

- Hong Ji-hee as Jang Hye-jin

Jae-ho's wife who is a culinary researcher.

- Kim Kyu-seon as Ashley Kim

Ji-hoon's wife, who is a Korean-American and the director of Woojung Gallery.

- Jang Hyuk-jin as Choi Jung-rak

A prosecutor at Gucheon Public Prosecutors' Office.

==== Gucheon Hospital ====
- Ok Ja-yeon as Hyun Ju-hee

Do-ha's wife who is the director of Gucheon Hospital.

- Kim Seon-hwa as Park Mi-young

The head nurse at Gucheon Hospital.

- Park Se-hyun as Jang Hee-joo

A nurse at Gucheon Hospital.

==== Gucheon Prison ====
- Jeong Jae-sung as Park Yoon-gap

The prison warden of Gucheon Prison.

- Kim Dong-won as Gan Su-cheol

A prison officer at Gucheon Prison.

- Kwak Dong-yeon as Jerry / Oh Jin-chul (real name)

A scammer with three previous convictions who respects the genius conman "Big Mouse".

- Yang Hyung-wook as Noh Park

A prisoner at Gucheon Prison.

==== People around Chang-ho ====
- Lee Ki-young as Ko Gi-kwang

Mi-ho's father.

- Oh Eui-shik as Kim Soon-tae

A lawyer who is Chang-ho's best friend and assistant.

=== Extended ===
- Yoo Tae-ju as Tak Kwang-yeon

A psychopath death row inmate at Gucheon Prison.

- Song Kyung-cheol as Yang Chun-sik

A gang leader.

- Park Jeong-bok as Go Tae-sik

A prisoner at Gucheon Prison.

- Shin Seung-hwan as Peter Hong
- Jeon Gook-hwan as Kang Seong-geun (Chairman Kang)

=== Special appearances ===
- Yoo Su-bin as Chang-ho and Mi-ho's neighbor.
- Kim Do-wan as Chang-ho and Mi-ho's neighbor.

== Production and release ==
It was reported that filming was scheduled to start in the second half of 2021, with a budget of ₩30 billion.

Big Mouth was initially confirmed to be released on tvN. However, in April 2022, it was announced that the series would air on MBC TV's newly established Fridays and Saturdays time slot instead, in July.

== Original soundtrack ==
=== Part 1 ===
Released on August 6, 2022
No.	Title	Lyrics	Music	Artist	Length
1.	"Brand New"	Justhis	Woo Ji-hun; Park Se-joon	Justhis	2:51
2.	"Brand New" (Inst.)		Woo Ji-hun; Park Se-joon		2:51
Total length:					5:42

== Viewership ==
Big Mouth : South Korea viewers per episode (millions)

Season	Episode number																Average
Season	1	2	3	4	5	6	7	8	9	10	11	12	13	14	15	16	Average
1	1.124	1.129	1.431	1.685	1.732	1.951	1.977	1.888	2.008	1.771	2.054	2.228	1.534	1.960	2.145	2.527	1.822

Source: Audience measurement performed nationwide by Nielsen Korea.

Average TV viewership ratings
Ep.	Original broadcast date	Average audience share		
Ep.	Original broadcast date	Nielsen Korea		TNmS
Ep.	Original broadcast date	Nationwide	Seoul	Nationwide
1	July 29, 2022	6.2% (7th)	6.3% (7th)	5.6% (10th)
2	July 30, 2022	6.1% (5th)	6.4% (4th)	6.1% (7th)
3	August 5, 2022	7.6% (4th)	8.1% (4th)	8.1% (5th)
4	August 6, 2022	8.6% (2nd)	8.7% (2nd)	N/A
5	August 12, 2022	9.8% (4th)	10.0% (3rd)	9.6% (4th)
6	August 13, 2022	10.8% (2nd)	10.8% (2nd)	10.0% (2nd)
7	August 19, 2022	11.2% (3rd)	11.4% (3rd)	10.1% (4th)
8	August 20, 2022	10.4% (2nd)	10.3% (2nd)	9.6% (2nd)
9	August 26, 2022	11.5% (2nd)	11.7% (2nd)	11.0% (2nd)
10	August 27, 2022	10.0% (2nd)	10.2% (2nd)	9.4% (2nd)
11	September 2, 2022	11.4% (4th)	11.4% (3rd)	11.2% (4th)
12	September 3, 2022	12.0% (2nd)	12.0% (2nd)	11.4% (2nd)
13	September 9, 2022	8.3% (4th)	8.3% (4th)	N/A
14	September 10, 2022	10.6% (2nd)	10.3% (2nd)	10.1% (2nd)
15	September 16, 2022	12.3% (3rd)	12.4% (3rd)	10.5% (3rd)
16	September 17, 2022	13.7% (2nd)	13.9% (2nd)	12.5% (2nd)
Average		10.0%	10.1%	9.7 (Note: This average ratings is calculated based on the published ratings, the exact average ratings is unknown due to multiple ratings not published.)
In the table above, the blue numbers represent the lowest ratings and the red numbers represent the highest ratings.; N/A denotes ratings that were not released.

== Awards and nominations ==
Award ceremony	Year	Category	Nominee(s) / Work	Result	Ref.
MBC Drama Awards	2022	Grand Prize (Daesang)	Lee Jong-suk	Won	
MBC Drama Awards	2022	Drama of the Year	Big Mouth	Won	
MBC Drama Awards	2022	Top Excellence Award, Actor in a Miniseries	Lee Jong-suk	Nominated	
MBC Drama Awards	2022	Top Excellence Award, Actress in a Miniseries	Im Yoon-ah	Won	
MBC Drama Awards	2022	Best Couple Award	Lee Jong-suk and Im Yoon-ah	Won	
