= Kim Ji-woo =

South Korean actress (born 1983)

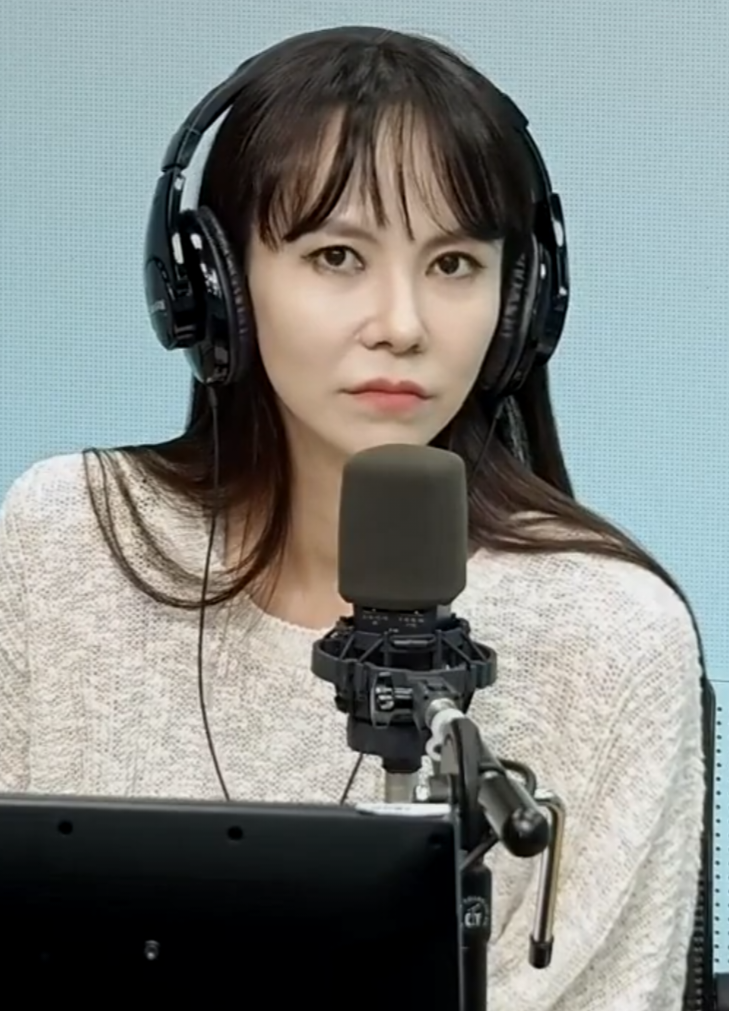
- Kim in 2023
- Born: Kim Jeong-eun; November 22, 1983 (age 42); Seoul, South Korea
- Education: Dankook University – Theater and Film
- Occupation: Actress
- Years active: 2001–present
- Agent: Bless Entertainment
- Spouse: Raymon Kim (m. 2013)
- Children: 1 daughter

Korean name
- Hangul: 김정은
- Hanja: 金正恩
- RR: Gim Jeongeun
- MR: Kim Chŏngŭn

Stage name
- Hangul: 김지우
- RR: Gim Jiu
- MR: Kim Chiu

Kim Ji-woo (Korean: 김지우; born November 22, 1983), birth name Kim Jeong-eun (김정은), is a South Korean actress.

== Filmography ==
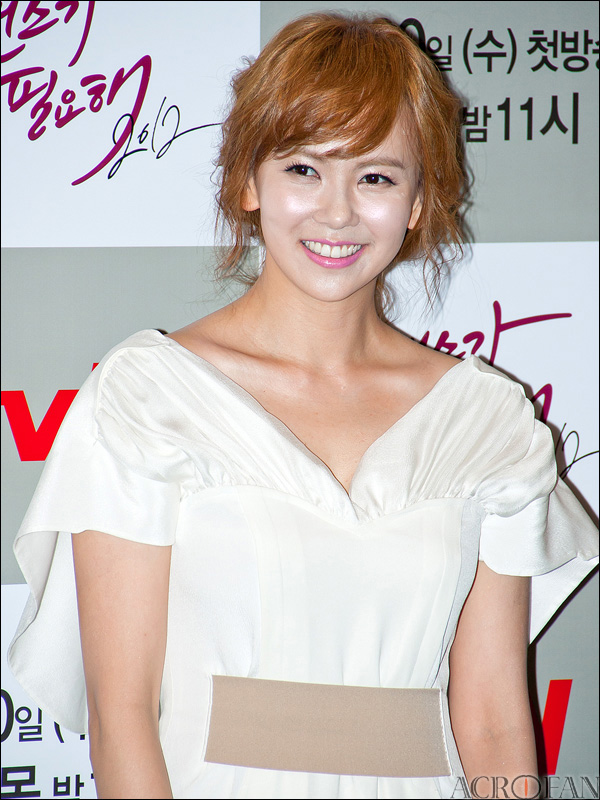
Kim at the I Need Romance 2012 press conference in 2012

=== Television series ===
Year	Title	Role
2001	Delicious Proposal	Hyo-dong's sister
2002	Affection	
2003	The Bean Chaff of My Life	Park Jeong-mi
2003	Something About 1%	Lee Jae-young
2003	Screen	Choi Kyung-ah
2003–2004	Merry Go Round	Ryu Soo-ryeon
2004	Exciting Change	Kim Ji-woo
2004	Forbidden Love	Kang Min-joo
2005	Nonstop 5	Kim Ji-woo
2005	Drama City: "Summer, A Tale of Goodbye"	Min-seon
2005	Drama City: "My Sweet Bloody Lover"	Mi-seon
2006	That Woman	Yoon Min-soo
2007	Company Love	Kim Ji-ae
2007	Bad Woman, Good Woman	Song Ji-woo
2007	Sexi Mong	Kwon Dong-eun
2012	I Need Romance 2012	Seon Jae-kyung

=== Film ===
Year	Title	Role
2002	Fox Rain	
2003	My Tutor Friend	Yang Ho-kyung
2005	She's on Duty	Ja-kyung
2011	Marrying the Mafia IV	Fujiko Mori

=== Variety show ===
Year	Title	Notes/Ref.
2008	Happy Together – Season 3	Guest (episode 70)
2013	Happy Together – Season 3	Guest (episode 320)
2015	Happy Together – Season 3	Guest (episode 407)
2015	King of Mask Singer	Contestant as "Blue Butterfly" (episode 1)
2016	Immortal Songs 2	Contestant (episodes 233, 244, 255)

== Musical ==
Year	Title	Korean title	Role
2006	Singin' in the Rain	사랑은 비를 타고	Yoo Mi-ri
2007	The Great Catsby	위대한 캣츠비	Persu
2007	Sweet Goodbye	달콤한 안녕	Shin-hee
2008	Singles	싱글즈	Na-nan
2008	The March of Youth	젊음의 행진	Oh Young-shim
2009	Finding Mr. Destiny	김종욱 찾기	Woman
2009	Legally Blonde	금발이 너무해	Elle Woods
2009	The March of Youth	젊음의 행진	Oh Young-shim
2010	Legally Blonde	금발이 너무해	Elle Woods
2011	The March of Youth	젊음의 행진	Oh Young-shim
2011	Rent	렌트	Mimi Márquez
2012	Doctor Zhivago	닥터 지바고	Lara Guisher
2012	The Sorrows of Young Werther	젊은 베르테르의 슬픔	Lotte
2013	Guys and Dolls	아가씨와 건달들	Sister Sarah Brown
2015	Gone with the Wind	바람과 함께 사라지다	Scarlett O'Hara
2018	Kinky Boots	킹키부츠	Lauren
2018	Chicago	시카고	Roxie Hart
2020	Kinky Boots	킹키부츠	Lauren
2020	A Gentleman's Guide to Love and Murder	젠틀맨스 가이드: 사랑과 살인편	Sibella
2021	Beetlejuice	비틀쥬스	Barbara Maitland
2022	Kinky Boots	킹키부츠	Lauren
2022-23	Moulin Rouge	물랑루즈	Satine
2023	Six	식스 더 뮤지컬	Anne Boleyn
2024	La Rose de Versailles	베르사유의 장미	Oscar François de Jarjayes

* Note: Most, if not all, large scale South Korean Musicals are generally double or triple cast for a role. The actors share the role equally and alternate throughout the eight show week.

== Awards and nominations ==
Year	Award	Category	Nominated work	Result
2009	3rd Daegu Musical Awards	Newcomer Award	N/A	Won
