= Yoon Na-moo =

South Korean actor (born 1985)

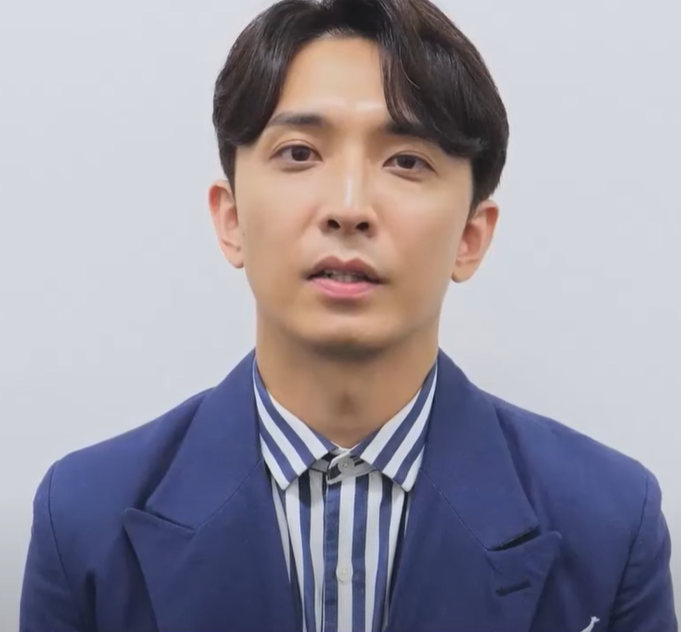
- Yoon in 2021
- Born: August 13, 1985 (age 41); Seoul, South Korea
- Education: Dongguk University
- Occupation: Actor
- Years active: 2016–present
- Agent: SM C&C

Korean name
- Hangul: 김태훈
- RR: Gim Taehun
- MR: Kim T'aehun

Stage name
- Hangul: 윤나무
- RR: Yun Namu
- MR: Yun Namu

Kim Tae-hoon (Korean: 김태훈; born August 13, 1985), better known by the stage name Yoon Na-moo (윤나무), is a South Korean actor under SM C&C. He is best known for his roles in the Korean television series Dr. Romantic (Season 1–3).

== Early life ==
Yoon was born on August 13, 1985, in Seoul, South Korea as Kim Tae-hoon. He graduated from Department of Theater Dongguk University.

== Career ==
=== 2011: Beginnings ===
In 2011, Kim Tae-hoon made his theater debut in the play "Private First Class," which was produced by the 12th Language Theater Studio. This play, written and directed by Seong Ki-woong, was selected as a program of the 2011 Seoul Cultural Foundation's Performing Arts Creation Promotion Project. Kim performed alongside Park Hyuk-min, Kim Sung-hyun, and Lee Hyun-gyun from June 23, 2011, to July 10, 2011, at the Hakjeon Blue Theater on University Road, which was also hosted by the Korean Culture and Arts Council and Hakjeon.

In that same year, Kim also took part in another production by The 12th Language, "Scientific Mind - Deep in the Forest," which was performed at Daehakro Information Small Theater from September 30 to October 16. The play was an adaptation of Oriza Hirata's Scientific Mind series, which had was premiered in Japan in 2009. It was set at an ape research center in Congo and questioned the differences between humans and other animals. The play won the Best Theater award at the 2011 Korean Theater Awards.

=== 2012–2015: Stage name and Kim Soo-ro Projects ===
Shortly after completing "Scientific Mind," Kim Tae-hoon participated in the 2nd Kim Soo-ro Project, the musical "Coffee Prince 1st Store." Yoon Na-mu and Kim Soo-ro met while attending university together. Kim Soo-ro played a significant role in expanding Yoon Na-mu's acting career by recognizing his talent early on. Due to a lot of similar names among actors, Kim Soo-ro suggested that Kim Tae-hoon consider a stage name. After careful thought, Kim Soo-ro proposed the name "Namu," derived from the musical practice room name, which means "tree," as it aligned with Kim Tae-hoon's image. Kim Tae-hoon embraced the name, explaining that it symbolized his aspiration to become a sturdy tree, providing shelter and comfort to others through his acting.

Kim Tae-hoon debuted with the stage name Yoon Na-moo in the musical "Coffee Prince 1st Store." The production ran from February 24 to April 29, 2012, at Daehakro Cultural Space Feeling Hall 1. Yoon had a double cast role as Seon-gi alongside Kim Dong-hyuk.

Yoon Na-mu was also recruited into Kim Soo-ro's management agency, Ro Brothers, which included other members like Kim Jae-beom, Seong Du-seop, Jo Kang-hyeon, Yoon So-ho, and Jeong Haru. Ro Brothers was a management company that focused on training and promoting musical stars under Kim Soo-ro's guidance. When Kim Soo-ro acquired the Mango Six Apgujeong branch, and Ro Brothers worked as the operators and brand ambassadors for the establishment.

Yoon Na-mu's was introduced to director Seo Yoon-mi through Kim Soo-ro. Impressed by the content and songs of "Black Mary Poppins," Yoon Na-mu decided to join the production. He played the role of Jonas, the youngest child who struggled with panic disorder and a speech impediment. "Black Mary Poppins" was a psychological mystery thriller musical, created as a collaboration between Kim Soo-ro and Seo Yoon-mi. Yang Joo-in served as the music director, and Cho Moon-soo designed the costumes. The show ran from May 8 to July 8 at the Daehakro Art One Theater.

After completing "Black Mary Poppins," Yoon joined the 4th Kim Soo-ro Project, a play called "Lee Ki-dong Gymnasium." The play originally premiered in 2009. In this production, Yoon Na-mu had the opportunity to act alongside Yoon Kyung-ho and Lee Ki-dong. The play premiered on October 26 at the Noonbit Theater, located in the Mimagi Art Center in Daehakro.

In 2013, Yoon Na-mu joined the fifth season of the musical 'The Bachelor's Vegetable Store', which was performed at Daehakro Arts Plaza 1 in Seoul from April until July 28, 2013. The musical is based on the true story of Mr. Lee Young-seok, the protagonist of a marketing success story. It premiered in 2008 and received rave reviews.

The play "Model Students" (playwriting Ji Yi-sun, directed by Kim Tae-hyung) was successfully completed until the 2012 season after its premiere in 2007, and was reborn more sophisticated work with new actors and refined directing in 2013. Yoon was triple-cast with Jang Hyeon-deok and Jeong Soon-won as Myeong-jun, a character with a cold appearance hiding a false sense of inferiority, in 7th encore performance of the play "Model Students." From May 31 to September 1, 2013, they took turns performing at Daehakro Jayu Theater (formerly PMC Jayu Theater).

Yoon was double-cast with Shin Seong-min as Young-min in the musical "Puberty." Directed by So-young, the musical is an adaptation of the German playwright Frank Wedekind's "Spring Awakening," portraying Korean teenagers. The story revolves around Young-min, who achieves top grades in school shortly after transferring, and Seon-gyu, an innocent child who loves dancing but is seen as problematic. The performance showcases the concerns and sorrows that today's youth experience through captivating music.

In 2015, Yoon played the role of boy prisoner Ro Ki-su in the musical ‘Ro Ki-su (directed by Kim Tae-hyung).

Yoon acted opposite Kim Ji-hyun in the play Capone Trilogy.

Then he collaborated for the second time with Kim Ji-hyun in and Director Kim Tae-hyung in the play The Curious Incident of the Dog in the Night-Time. He portrayed the character of Christopher, a 15-year-old.

He worked for the third time alongside Kim Ji-hyun in the omnibus play "Almost, Maine." In the episode titled "Her Heart," they portray lovers, which is the only episode out of the nine where they work together in that setting.

The play "Kill Me Now," the 6th work of "Theatre Passion," features Yoon in the role of Joey, a 17-year-old boy with a congenital disability who aspires to become an "adult." The story revolves around Jake, a father who has dedicated his life to his son Joey.

=== 2016–present: Television debut ===
In 2016, he made his debut on television through the SBS drama Dr. Romantic and received recognition for his stable acting skills in his first work. It was his first experience with drama auditions, and because there is a significant difference between stage and camera acting, he practiced with his two juniors before the first shoot, thinking about various scenarios and movements to avoid making mistakes.

"When I go to the filming set, I think of the staff as the first audience. The staff set up the cameras, and I act on stage as if performing a play. Whether it's a stage performance or a drama, I start acting within myself, and there is the joy of discovering something new within myself. I think it's my responsibility to show that to the viewers or the audience," he expressed his acting philosophy.

In May 2017, he made a special appearance in the KBS2 drama Fight for My Way. He portrayed a character who was annoying and despicable, captivating viewers with his acting.

Yoon Na-moo played the role of Treat in the play Orphans, directed by Kim Tae-hyung. Orphans is a well-known work by American playwright Lyle Kessler. It tells the story of orphaned brothers Treat and Philip, who have lived isolated lives, meeting Harold, a middle-aged Chicago gangster in his 50s. Their cohabitation begins by chance. Treat's character became violent after his mother died and he spent his childhood with an irresponsible father. The play was performed at Art One Theater Hall 2 from September 19 to November 26, 2017.

In November 2017, he portrayed Song Gil-chun in the SBS drama Oh, the Mysterious. His intense acting drew viewers' attention as he portrayed a psychopathic character. His dialogue delivery, unfocused gaze, and eerie expressions with no visible thoughts intensified the tension of the drama. Particularly, his emotionless singing and smiling scene created a creepy atmosphere.

In July 2018, in the SBS drama Your Honor, he played the role of the third-generation chaebol Lee Ho-sung, who has no hesitation in resorting to bullying and violence, and perfectly portrayed a cynical character, showcasing his presence as a scene-stealer. Yoon Namu described how he encountered a character named Lee Hoseong in the process. After finishing the play Capone Trilogy, Yoon, who was contemplating between theater performances, dramas, and movie auditions, happened to audition for drama Your Honor. Yoon said, "I had seen a lot of auditions, and it seemed like they couldn't find an actor to play this role. At that time, I didn't know about the situation and went for the audition. Initially, the acting was pleasing to the director, but he mentioned that he envisioned a character with a certain aura. He asked us to come back the next day, and there were about four of us, including myself. Everyone was of large build. I thought they were looking for people like that, so I cleared my mind and did the audition. Then, he said, 'Let's do it together.'"

In April 2019, through JTBC's Beautiful World, he delivered a strong message to viewers as the Korean language teacher 'Lee Jin-woo,' who is angry at the school's indifferent attitude towards covering up the death of Park Sun-ho (played by Nam Da-reum). And in tvN's 'Melting Me Softly,' he played the role of the older brother figure 'Go Nam-tae,' captivating viewers with his innocent charm.

In September 2019, in the SBS drama Vagabond, contrary to the expectations of viewers who firmly believed he was a helper of Cha Dal-gun (played by Lee Seung-gi) and Go Hae-ri (played by Bae Suzy), it was revealed near the end of the series that he was actually a spy for the hidden forces behind the scenes, shocking the audience.

In January 2020, in the SBS drama Dr. Romantic Season 2, he reprised his role as the emergency medicine specialist Jung In-soo. In his comeback after three years, he showcased a charismatic gaze when looking at emergency patients, and fearlessly gave orders to his juniors, demonstrating a heightened level of professionalism. He received praise for depicting the growth of the character, as well as portraying the struggles that a real doctor faces and the depth of human emotions. It was evaluated as a narrative of a character that had deepened even further, eliciting empathy and support from many people.

In drama Now, We Are Breaking Up, Yoon acted as Kwak Soo-ho, 36 years old, deputy head of the planning team. Jeon Mi-sook's husband and Seok Do-hoon's colleague.

Yoon chose Kim Ju-won's Sa-gun-ja: The Seasons of Life as his return to the stage after 10 months. Kim Ju-won's Sa-gun-ja: The Seasons of Life weaves together four beautiful stories inspired by the themes of birth, hardship, love, and death. Author Ji I-seon created and connected these stories based on the symbolic framework of Sa-gun-ja, completing a script centered around the concept of "fate" or "destiny". Not only does it present the theme of "fate" through a unique structure, but it also incorporates visual elements for stage performance. The theme of "fate" transcending time and space is visually represented on stage through holographic techniques in the production's visuals. Yoon took ballet and modern dance classes with co-star Park Hae-soo for two months, due to the nature of the play, messages must be conveyed to the audience through gestures as well as dialogue.

Yoon worked with director Min Sae-rom in play based on the 2013 novel Réparer les vivants (Mend the Living) by Maylis de Kerangal. The play "Mending the Living" depicted Simon Rambert's heart transplant journey over a 24-hour period. Simon, a 19-year-old who suffered a brain death diagnosis from an accident, had his life's fate determined. The play didn't solely revolve around the moment of the heart transplant, but rather captured the 24 hours leading up to it, during which 16 characters were involved. Yoon participated in the production, serving as a commentator, a hospital doctor, the parents of the young man, the patient receiving the heart transplant, and becoming Simon and his girlfriend. Yoon stated, "You can consider the commentator as Yoon Na-mu himself." He personally interviewed each character that appeared in the work or embodied that person, thus becoming the focal point of the play. After its premiere at the Wooran Cultural Foundation in 2019, "Mending the Living" continued its run at the National Jeongdong Theater.

From December 2021 to March 2022, after a six-year hiatus, he returned to the musical stage with the musical Fan Letter, playing the role of Kim Hae-jin and receiving accolades as a life-like character from the audience.

Afterward, in the musical The Showman: The Fourth Casting of a Dictator, he played the eccentric old man Nebula, who was the understudy for a former dictator, and showed growth as a musical actor with a wide range of acting skills from the age of 9 to 72. With this work, he won the Best Actor award at the 16th Daegu International Musical Festival (DIMF) in 2022 and the 7th Korea Musical Awards in 2023.

== Filmography ==
=== Television series ===
Year	Title	Role	Notes	Ref.
2016–2023	Dr. Romantic	Jeong In-soo	Season 1–3	
2017	Fight for My Way	Si-kyeong		
2017	Oh, the Mysterious	Song Il-chun		
2018	Your Honor	Lee Ho-sung		
2019	Beautiful World	Lee Jin-woo		
2019	Vagabond	Kim Ho-sik		
2019	Melting Me Softly	Ko Nam-tae		
2021–2022	Now, We Are Breaking Up	Kwak Soo-ho		
2022	Extraordinary Attorney Woo	Jung-nam	Cameo (episode 13)	
2022	One Dollar Lawyer	Choi Ki-tae	Cameo	
2023	Miraculous Brothers	Yuk Chan-seong		
2024	Connection	Park Jun-seo		

=== Web series ===
Year	Title	Role	Notes	Ref.
2019	Love Alarm	Kim Min-jae	Season 1	

== Stage ==
=== Concert ===
Concert performances
Year	Title		Role	Theater	Date	Ref.
Year	English	Korean	Role	Theater	Date	Ref.
2015	Musical Talk Concert Who Am I 27	뮤지컬토크콘서트 Who Am I 27	Himself	Olympus hall	November 30	
2016	THE MOMENT - 10 actors, their story	THE MOMENT - 배우 10인, 그들의 이야기	Himself	SMTOWN THEATRE	Jul 25	
2016	2016 Zara Island Musical Festival	2016 자라섬 뮤지컬 페스티벌	Himself	Gapyeong-gun, Gyeong-do, Jara Island	September 3–4	

=== Musical ===
Musical performances
Year	Title		Role	Theater	Date	Ref.
Year	English	Korean	Role	Theater	Date	Ref.
2012	Coffee Prince 1st Store	커피프린스 1호점	Seon-gi	Daehak-ro T.O.M. Hall 1	Feb 24 to Apr 29	
2012	Black Mary Poppins	블랙메리포핀스	Yonas	Art One Theatre 1	May 8 – July 29	
2013	The Bachelor's Vegetable Store	총각네 야채가게	Tae-sung	Art Centre 1	March 26 – Sep 1	
2013–2014	Agatha	아가사	Raymond	Lee Hae-rang Arts Theatre	Dec 31 – Feb 23	
2014	Agatha	아가사	Raymond	Yes 24 Stage 2	Mar 1 – Apr 27	
2014	Black Mary Poppins	블랙메리포핀스	Yonas	Art One Theatre 1	Jun 10 – Aug 31	
2014	Shall We Go to the Karaoke and Talk?	우리 노래방가서 얘기 좀 할까	Son	Dongsung Art Centre Small Theatre	Aug 9 – Oct 19	
2014	Shall We Go to the Karaoke and Talk?	우리 노래방가서 얘기 좀 할까	Son	Dongsung Art Centre Small Theatre	Oct 6	
2014	Shall We Go to the Karaoke and Talk?	우리 노래방가서 얘기 좀 할까	Son	Gyeonggi Art Centre Small Theatre	Dec 24–25	
2014–2015	Adolescence	사춘기	Young-min	Chungmu Art Centre Middle Theatre Black	Nov 21 – Feb 15	
2015	Ro Ki-su	로기수	Ro Ki-su	Yes 24 Stage 1	Mar 12 – May 31	
2015	Cheerful Kyungsung	명랑경성	Sunwoo	CJ Azit	April 27–28	
2015	Pungwolju	풍월주	Saddam	Plus Theatre (ex. Culture Space N.U.)	Sep 8 – Nov 22	
2016	Ro Ki-su	로기수	Ro Ki-su	Yes 24 Stage 1	Feb 16 – April 3	
2016	Ro Ki-su	로기수	Ro Ki-su	Wonju Baekun Art Hall	Dec 25–26	
2019	Adolescence	사춘기	Young-min	Seogyeong University Performing Arts Centre SKON 2	May 27	
2022	Fan Letter	팬레터	Kim Hae-jin	Online	Nov 14	
2022	Showman - A Dictator's Fourth Body Double	쇼맨	Nebula	National Jeongdong Theatre (Seoul)	Apr 1 – May 15	
2021–2022	Fan Letter	팬레터	Kim Hae-jin	COEX Shinhan Card Atrium	Dec 10 – Mar 20	
2023	Showman - A Dictator's Fourth Body Double	쇼맨	Nebula	National Jeongdong Theatre (Seoul)	Sep 15 – Nov 12	

=== Theater ===
Theater performances
Year	Title		Role	Theater	Date	Ref.
Year	English	Korean	Role	Theater	Date	Ref.
2011	Third Class	삼등병	Yoon Jin-won	Hakjeon Blue Small Theatre	June 23 – July 10	
2011	The Mind of Science - The Abyss of the Forest	과학하는마음 - 숲의 심연		Daehak-ro Information Small Theatre	Sep 30 – Oct 16	
2012–2013	Lee Ki-dong Gym	이기동 체육관	Young Lee Ki-dong	Mimaji Art Centre Eye Theatre	Oct 26 – Jan 20	
2013	Model students	모범생들	Kim Myeong-jun	Daehakno Free Theatre	May 31 – Sep 29	
2013–2014	Almost, Maine	올모스트 메인	Randy	Art Plaza 4, Daehak-ro	Nov 11 – Jan 19	
2014	History Boys	히스토리 보이즈	Posner	Doosan Art Centre Yeongang Hall	Mar 14 – Apr 20	
2015	Capone Trilogy	카포네 트릴로지	Young man	Hongik University Daehangno Art Center Small Theater	July 14 – Oct 4	
2015	The Curious Incident of the Dog in the Night-Time	한밤중에 개에게 일어난 의문의 사건	Christopher	Gwanglim Art Center BBCH Hall	November 27 – February 6	
2016	Almost, Maine	올모스트 메인	Pete, Jimmy, Phil	Sangmyung Art Hall 1	January 8 to July 3	
2016	Theatrical Battle 6 - Kill Me Now	연극열전6 - 킬 미 나우	Joy	Chungmu Art Center Medium Theater Black	May 1 – July 3	
2016	Hamik	함익		Sejong Centre for the Performing Arts M Theatre	Sep 30 – Oct 16	
2017	Kill Me Now	킬 미 나우	Joy	Chungmu Art Center Medium Theater Black	April 25 – July 16	
2017	Model Students	모범생들	Kim Myung-joon	Daehak-ro Dream Art Centre 4	June 4 – Aug 27	
2017	Orphans	오펀스	Treat	Art One Theatre 2	Sep 19 – Nov 26	
2017–2018	The Helmet	더 헬멧	Helmet E	Art One Theatre 3	Dec 19 – Mar 4	
2018	Capone Trilogy	카포네 트릴로지	Young man	Hongik University Daehangno Art Center Small Theater	Mar 20 – Jun 17	
2019	Kill Me Now	킬 미 나우	Joy	Sejong Centre for the Performing Arts S Theatre	May 11 – Jul 6	
2019	Puberty Contest	사춘기 콘서트	-	Seogyeong University Performing Arts Centre SKON 2	May 27	
2019	Pride and Prejudice	오만과 편견	A2	Chungmu Arts Center Medium Theater Black	Aug 27 – Oct 20	
2019	Kill Me Now	킬 미 나우	Joy	Uijeongbu Arts Centre Grand Theatre	September 20–21	
2019	Heal the Living	살아있는 자를 수선하기	Narrator et al.	Wooran Cultural Foundation Wooran Hall 2	December 13–21	
2020	Space	공간	Special appearance	Seogyeong University Performing Arts Centre SKON 2	July 22–26	
2020	Kim Joo-won's Four-guns: the Season of Life	김주원의 사군자_생의 계절		National Jeongdong Theatre (Seoul)	Oct 22 – Nov 8	
2022	Heal the Living	살아있는 자를 수선하기	Narrator et al.	Lee Hae-rang Arts Theater	07.26–09.04	
2022	On the Beat	온 더 비트	Adrien	Daehak-ro T.O.M.2	May 17 – June 25	
2022–2023	On the Beat	온 더 비트	Adrien	Daehak-ro T.O.M.2	Nov 21 – Jan 1	
2024	Heal the Living	살아있는 자를 수선하기	Narrator et al.	National Jeongdong Theater	Jan 20 – Mar 20	

== Awards and nominations ==
Name of the award ceremony, year presented, category, nominee of the award, and the result of the nomination
Award ceremony	Year	Category	Nominee / Work	Result	Ref.
16th Daegu International Musical Festival Best Actor Award	2022	Best Actor	Showman - A Dictator's Fourth Body Double	Won	
7th Korea Musical Awards	2023	Best Actor	Showman - A Dictator's Fourth Body Double	Won	
2023 SBS Drama Awards	2023	Best Supporting Actor in a Miniseries Genre/Fantasy Drama	Dr. Romantic 3	Nominated	
