= A Tale of Legendary Libido =

2008 film by Shin Han-sol

- Theatrical poster
- Directed by: Shin Han-sol
- Written by: Shin Han-sol
- Produced by: Lee Seo-yeol; Kim Sang-il
- Starring: Bong Tae-gyu; Kim Shin-ah; Oh Dal-su
- Cinematography: Lee Hyung-deok
- Edited by: Moon In-dae
- Music by: Kim Tae-seong
- Production company: Prime Entertainment
- Distributed by: Showbox
- Release date: April 30, 2008 (South Korea)
- Running time: 120 minutes
- Country: South Korea
- Language: Korean
- Box office: US$1.7 million

A Tale of Legendary Libido (Korean: 가루지기; RR: Garujigi) is a 2008 South Korean comedy film directed and written by Shin Han-sol starring Bong Tae-gyu, Kim Shin-ah, and Oh Dal-su released on April 30, 2008.

== Plot ==
The film starts with an opening subplot involving an old woman (played by Youn Yuh-jung) who has been a lonely widow for 30 years. She is praying to a Jangseung totem pole to bring a man into her life. To her surprise, the totem pole responds by giving her its nose, which is used for magical purposes regarding sexual pleasure with a certain spell. (This is a parody of the plot of the South Korean softcore film "Mueose seuneun mulgeoningo" (1993).)

Meanwhile, Byeon Gang-soe, who lives with his older brother Kang-mok, is a meek rice cake seller in a remote mountainous village in Joseon dynasty Korea. Mocked for his impaired libido, Gang-soe learns from an old monk that a potion buried in the forest will cure his condition of having an unusable penis, but one should drink it in moderation, as drinking all of it would bring a huge disaster to the village. Gang-soe takes the potion; however he ignores the warning of drinking in moderation, leading to him having a huge libido.

Returning to the village, Gang-soe soon learns that his older brother has been drafted in the war (despite being previously drafted), leaving Kang-mok's wife, Dal-gaeng, lonely. Despite his love for Dal-gaeng, the other girls in the village seduce him to make love; this leads to Gang-soe feeling guilty over Dal-gaeng, who shows reciprocal emotions toward him. While this is ongoing, the village is caught up in a huge fire, due to the huge influence of the yin energy in the village resulting from his libido; this in turn leads to a huge drought, which leads to Dal-gaeng being ill. The physician hesitantly tells Gang-soe that her only cure is having sex to reduce the heat the girl is facing.

Kang-mok, who was believed to be dead by the villagers, returns after Dal-gaeng has become pregnant, leading to awkward situations between the two brothers; this is resolved after it is revealed that Kang-mok picked the girl not as his own wife but as a wife candidate for Gang-soe.

Rumors about Gang-soe's libido reach government institutions, and he receives a quest to participate in a duel in front of western delegates to showcase the extent of his libido against a western challenger. After the showcase before the delegates, he is sent on a final quest to ease the sexual desires of an ungnyeo (bear woman) with his libido along with the villagers' rain dance, which resolves the drought problem of the village with rain. The film ends with an epilogue that reveals the offspring of the women he slept with all show signs of having a huge libido.

== Cast ==
- Bong Tae-gyu as Byeon Gang-soe
- Kim Shin-ah as Dal-gaeng
- Oh Dal-su as Kang-mok
- Youn Yuh-jung as Old woman
- Song Jae-ho as Old monk
- Jeon Soo-kyeong as Hostel owner
- Kwon Byeong-gil as High official
- Lee Jung-sub as District magistrate
- Kim Ki-hyeon as Blind physician
- Seo Young as Dan-bi
- Kim Ki-doo

== Release ==
A Tale of Legendary Libido was released in South Korea on 30 April 2008, and was ranked sixth at the box office on its opening weekend with 89,997 admissions. As of 25 May, the film had received a total of 272,493 admissions, and as of 1 June had grossed a total of US$1,720,621.
