= Kang Eun-bi =

South Korean actress (born 1986)

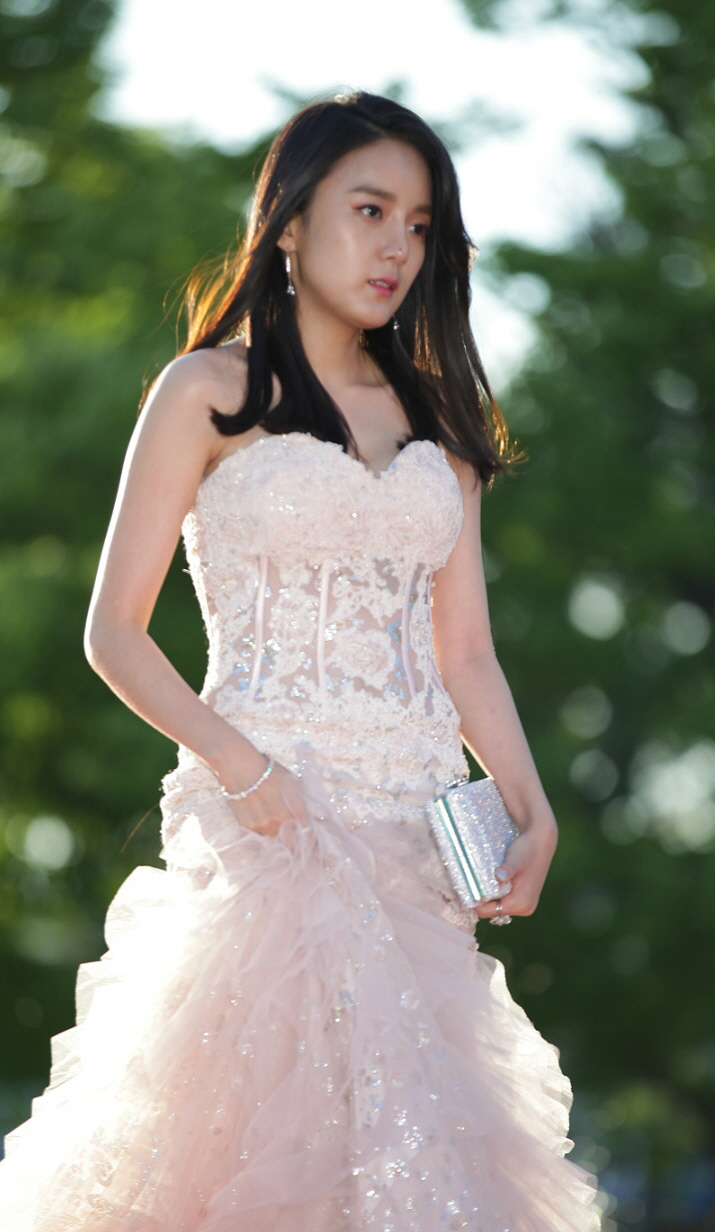
- Kang in 2015
- Born: Joo Mi-jin; April 15, 1986 (age 40); Seoul, South Korea
- Other name: Song Eun-chae (송은채)
- Occupation: Actress
- Years active: 2005–present
- Spouse: Byun Jun-pil (m. 2025)

Korean name
- Hangul: 주미진
- RR: Ju Mijin
- MR: Chu Mijin

Stage name
- Hangul: 강은비
- RR: Gang Eunbi
- MR: Kang Ŭnbi

Joo Mi-jin (Korean: 주미진; born April 15, 1986), better known professionally as Kang Eun-bi, is a South Korean actress and online streamer. In 2012, she changed her stage name to Song Eun-chae. In 2016, she went back to using the name Kang Eun-bi.

== Career ==
Kang was inspired to become an actress in elementary school after seeing Jung Sun-kyung play the titular character of the 1995 drama Jang Hui-bin. In middle school, she was cast by SM Entertainment, but her mother called the deal off after seeing their contract. Kang instead became a magazine model, drawn in by the prospect of earning money. Kang was also active as an internet ulzzang, having been a famous figure on the Daum "Five Big Ulzzangs" community, and was named the best ulzzang on a program aired by cable TV channel Qwiny.

Her first acting role was in the 2005 movie Wet Dreams 2, where she was picked out of 3,500 auditionees. The same year, she appeared in the Drama City episode "Pokhara", her debut TV role. She was also cast in the series Golden Apple, but she left during production as she was set to appear in Special of My Life, a show planned to share its time slot. In the sitcom Rainbow Romance, the sixth installment of the Nonstop series, she played an immature college student majoring in dance, a subject which she had previous experience in. She had minored in ballet until her junior year of high school.

In 2006, Special of My Life aired, in which Kang starred as the younger sister of Myung Se-bin's character, though she did not appear in the first few episodes. Following Special of My Life, she starred alongside Yoon Eun-hye and Oh Man-seok as a country girl in the drama The Vineyard Man; for her part, she studied the Chungcheong dialect of Korean. In 2007, she starred in the cable drama Sexi Mong as detective Kang Han-na. The role, described as strong and sexy, was a departure from the cute characters she had played up to that point. Her next role was in My Too Perfect Sons, where she played a single mother.

In 2009, she made her debut as a singer with the single "Makin' Love", which she had prepared for 6 months.

Kang started internet broadcasting on Avatar TV in 2016. In November 2017, Kang opened an account on the South Korean streaming platform AfreecaTV. She was awarded the Best Female Variety Streamer and the Best New Streamer award at the 2018 Afreeca TV BJ Awards.

== Personal life ==
On March 6, 2025, Kang announced that she would marry interior designer Byun Jun-pil, her boyfriend of 17 years, in April.

== Filmography ==
=== Television series ===
Year	Title	Role	Note	Ref.
2005	Rainbow Romance	Kim Eun-bi	Sitcom	
2006	Special of My Life	Yoon Ye-rin		
2006	The Vineyard Man	Park Hong-yi		
2007	Sexi Mong	Kang Han-na		
2008	Cooking up Romance	Han Kye-sook		
2009	My Too Perfect Sons	Choi Soo-hee		

=== Film ===
Year	Title	Role	Note	Ref.
2006	Mr. Wacky	Choi Jin-joo		
2007	Drawing paper (도화지)	Sang-won		
2014	Wrestling	Eun-hee		
2015	Lost Flower Eo Woo-dong	Hye-in / Eo Woo-dong		
