= Kim Joo-hun =

South Korean actor (born 1980)

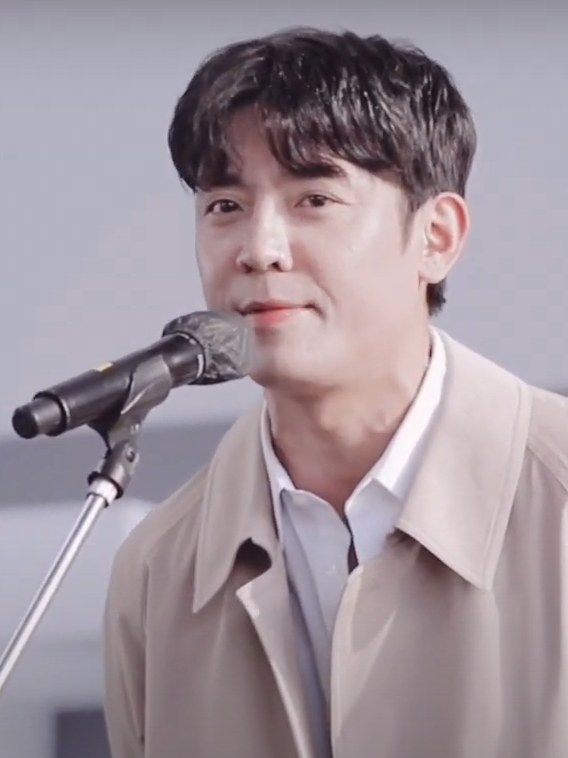
- Kim in 2021
- Born: March 1, 1980 (age 46); Pohang, Gyeongsangbuk-do, South Korea
- Education: Seoul Institute of the Arts
- Occupation: Actor
- Years active: 2007–present
- Agent: Secret Entertainment

Korean name
- Hangul: 김주헌
- Hanja: 金柱憲
- RR: Gim Juheon
- MR: Kim Chuhŏn

Kim Joo-hun (Korean: 김주헌; born March 1, 1980) is a South Korean theater, television and film actor. He debuted in 2007 in play Gangster Number 1. He was a member of Alleyway Theater Company from 2009 until 2014. He is best known for his roles in the television series Encounter (2018), Dr. Romantic 2 (2020), It's Okay to Not Be Okay (2020), (2021), Big Mouth (2022), and Castaway Diva (2023).

== Early life and education ==
Kim was born on March 1, 1980, in Pohang, Gyeongsang Province, South Korea. He has an older sister. Initially, he pursued a major in sculpture at Andong National University's College of Fine Arts, However, after completing his military service, his aspirations shifted towards acting, leading him to enroll in the acting department. Kim continued his education at the Seoul Institute of the Arts where he successfully earned a bachelor's degree in Theater and Film. Throughout his studies, he developed a stronger affinity for film classes, participating in only a handful of theater productions.

== Career ==
=== Early career as member of Alleyway Theater Company ===
In 2007, Kim made his debut in the play Gangster No.1. The play delved into the story of a gangster's rise to power. It shed light on an era marked by intense competition and materialistic pursuits. The play was performed at Theater Tree and Water of Daehak-ro Art Theater, running from August 8 until September 30.

In 2008, Kim acted in the independent short black and white film A Matter of Principle. It advanced to the finals of the Mise-en-scène Short Film Festival and was screened at Yongsan CGV from June 26 to July 2, 2008.

While performing in a college play, Kim and fellow actor Shim Jae-hyun caught the attention of Professor Park Geun-hyung, a renowned professor of Seoul Institute of the Arts and the leader of Alleyway Theater Company. Professor Park invited them to one of his own play. This led to Kim being cast in the Korean production of Marat/Sade (2009) by playwright Peter Weiss, produced by the Seoul Theater Company and directed by Park Geun-hyung himself. Subsequently, Kim joined the Alleyway Theater Company as a member.

In 2013, as part of the 10th Anniversary Festival of Alleyway Theater Company, Kim portrayed poet Yi Sang in the Korean two-hander play Raising the Sun in the Sky, written by playwright Kwon Tae and directed by Lee Eun-joon. This performance had a profound impact on Kim's theater career, earning him the Best Actor award at the 11th Two-hander Theater Festival. Subsequently, he took on a minor role in the feature film Way Back Home (2013), followed by The Con Artists (2014).

=== Hiatus from theater, minor roles and theater comeback ===
After leaving the Alleyway Theater Company in 2014, Kim took a hiatus from theater acting, during which he worked as a construction laborer to make ends meet. In 2015, Kim signed an exclusive contract with Urban Entertainment. He accepted minor roles in various films, and subsequently appeared in Tazza: The Hidden Card (2015), Planck Constant (2015), The Accidental Detective (2015), A Violent Prosecutor (2016), and a box office film Train to Busan (2016). He also made his television debut with minor roles in the OCN drama series Squad 38.

In the spring of 2017, Kim made his return to Daehak-ro by portraying Håkon Håkonsson, King-elect of Norway, in the premiere of a Korean adaptation of Henrik Ibsen's play The Pretenders, titled The Claimants of the Throne. Directed by Kim Gwang-bo and written by Ko Yeon-ok, who had previously collaborated on a project, the performance took place at the Sejong Center for the Performing Arts M Theater.

Later that year, in the fall of 2017, Kim took on the role of French Diplomat Rene Gallimard in the third Korean adaptation of David Henry Hwang's play M. Butterfly, as part of The Best Plays Festival's (Note: Best Play Festival or Theater Heated Battle (연극열전) is biennale theater festival with the purpose of motivating and enriching the Korean theater industry.) repertoire. Directed by Kim Dong-yeon, the play ran from September to December at the Art One Theater Hall 1.

=== Breakthrough roles in small screen ===
"We are working on two short dramas, and he is someone I have rarely seen acting on TV or in movies, but he has been very active in plays. I went to see the play after receiving a recommendation from an assistant director, and it was a play that encompassed everything from comedy to emotional action. After seeing how well he handled it, I thought he would be able to show both the critical feel of Too Bright for Romance and the bold feel of Dreamers, so I cast him."

— Director Yoo Young-eun about Kim Joo-hun, Maeil Business Newspaper Interview

Kim rose to prominence as an actor after his role as Ahn Jae-geun, a whistleblower at Seomyoung Foods, in the tvN drama Argon (2017), where he was praised for his captivating performance. He then went on to star in the KBS Drama Special 2018. He appeared in one-act drama Too Bright for Romance, where he played the role of the renowned theater critic Kim Hyung-seok. Directed by Yoo Young-eun, this drama special was the fourth installment of the KBS Drama Special 2018, which aired on October 5, 2018. It was based on Kim Geum-hee's novel of the same name, which had won the grand prize at the 7th Young Artist Award in 2016.

Kim collaborated with director Yoo Young-eun once again in seventh installment of KBS Drama Special 2018, titled "Dreamers". Kim portrayed a character who manages the dream world and has control over those who escape reality into their dreams. His detailed and skillful acting made a strong impression and increased viewer immersion in the drama, showcasing his talents as an experienced theater actor. This drama aired on October 25, 2018. Kim was cast in both drama because director Yoo Young-eun had seen one of his theater performances. Prior to the drama airing, Kim signed an exclusive contract with S.A.L.T. Entertainment on October 23, 2018.

Kim gained wider recognition after starring in the 2018 tvN drama series Encounter, where he portrays Lee Dae-chan, the easy-going and cheerful owner of Chan's Golbaengi, a small restaurant. He showcases his own character well when acting with actors Song Hye-kyo, Park Bo-gum, Pyo Ji-hoon, and Kwak Sun-young. His love line with Kwak Sun-young also an attractive sub-plot, as it intertwines due to a fateful meeting. Kim's performance in Encounter marked a turning point in his career, as he gained wider recognition and established himself as a talented television actor.

I've been fortunate to come across good works and remarkable roles, and I feel like I'm a very lucky person. I started acting because I enjoyed it and loved being on stage, but looking back, I feel like I lived somewhat naively. During my time with the theater troupe, we often presented plays that raised questions about society. However, at that time, when I saw posters that seemed to prioritize both artistic quality and commercial appeal, I sometimes found myself thinking, 'That can't be a play.' While doing socially impactful theater, I felt a great sense of purpose, but after 5-6 years, I started to feel tired and drained. There weren't many regular audience members, and economically, it became difficult. I questioned why I was doing it. Around 2015, when I felt frustrated with theater, I took a break, partly voluntary and partly out of necessity. After a two-year hiatus, I returned in 2017 with 'Claimants of the Throne.' Now, facing many audiences, my narrow-minded views about theater have changed a lot, and I'm simply grateful to be able to encounter such wonderful works.

— Newsculture

In 2019, Kim costarred in Korean adaptation of US series Designated Survivor: 60 Days. His role is the show's counterpart of Jason Atwood, Jung Han-mo, NIS Terrorism Task Force Chief.

=== Career breakthrough and recent theater projects ===
In 2020, Kim joined Season 2 of SBS drama series in Romantic Doctor Kim Sa Bu, as Park Min-kook, a professor of general surgery and the new director of Doldam Hospital who think of Kim Sa Bu, starred Han Suk-kyu, as his rival. His solid performance won Best Supporting Actor in 2020 SBS Drama Awards.

In the same year, he also begin to be recognized internationally for his role in tvN and Netflix drama series It's Okay to Not Be Okay. He starred as Lee Sang-in, the CEO of SangsangESang Publishing Company, which publishes Moon-young's children's books. He also starred as lead role in Kim Jee-woon's short film Untact alongside Kim Go-eun. Kim made special appearance in the pilot episode of tvN mini-series Start-Up, as the father of Bae Suzy's character.

Kim took on the role of Cha Eun-seok, an orthopedic surgeon experiencing the effects of Burnout syndrome, in the KBS drama Do Do Sol Sol La La Sol. While playing the second lead, Kim's performance in the drama was highly praised and earned him a nomination for Best Supporting Actor at the 2020 KBS Drama Awards.

When Kim was filming a television. drama, he received script of play The Understudy. Kim then played Harry in the South Korean premiere of the play The Understudy, a black comedy that revolves around a fictional, unpublished work by Franz Kafka. The story follows Jake, the understudy for top Hollywood star Bruce, and explores the preparation process with the involvement of Harry, Jake's own understudy, and Roxanne, the stage director. The play was performed at the Jayu Small Theater of the Seoul Arts Center from December 21 to February 27, 2022.

In the same year, Kim went on to portray another second lead character in the SBS mini-series Now, We Are Breaking Up. This marked his second collaboration with Song Hye-kyo. He played the role of Seok Do-hoon, a 40-year-old talented CEO of a PR company. Kim's performance in the drama earned him the Excellence Award for an Actor in a Mini-Series Romance/Comedy Drama at the SBS Drama Awards.

In April 2022, Kim returned to the theater with The Invisible Hand, the second production of The Best Play Festival Season 9th. The Invisible Hand is a financial thriller that unfolds a suspenseful story depicting the process of earning $10 million for oneself. Kim took on the role of Nick Bright, an American investment expert who gets kidnapped by a Pakistani armed group. The play was performed at Art One Theater Hall 2 on April 26 to June 30.

In the second half of 2021, Kim collaborated with Director Oh Chung-hwan for the second time after his special appearance in Start-Up for drama Big Mouse. written by Kim Ha-ram drama Big Mouse, and directed by Oh Chung-hwan and Bae Hyun-jin, started to air in the MBC Friday-Saturday slot in July 2023. Kim left a lasting impact on viewers with his portrayal of Gucheon Mayor Choi Do-ha. The drama concluded on September 17, starting with a viewership rate of 6.2% and reaching its peak viewership of 13.7% in the final episode.

When I was creating Choi Do-ha, there was something I wanted to have a new texture. Through Choi Do-ha, I wanted to give the viewers a sense of discomfort and fear, like a fog or a swamp that covers the lake. I tend to use a lot of images when creating a character. I wondered if I could express Choi Do-ha with one tear and one smile. When I do comedy, I tend to try to express that sense of rhythm while thinking of a cute and bouncy hummingbird or a deer running through the meadow.

— Single List Interview

In 2022, Kim made a memorable special appearance in the 15th and 16th episodes of ENA Channel's Extraordinary Attorney Woo as a show of support for director Yoo In-sik. In September 2022, it was reported that Kim is scheduled to reprise his role as Park Min-kook, in Season 3 of SBS drama series Romantic Doctor Kim Sa Bu. In the same month it was announced that Kim was cast in the drama When the Stars Gossip. His role, Park Dong-ah, is a veteran astronaut who has been to the space station three times and is a member of Seoul's Mission Control Center with Eve Kim (played by Gong Hyo-jin). The drama is planned to be aired in 2024.

In the end of 2022, Kim's first feature film Fairy was premiered in panorama section of the 26th Busan International Film Festival. Kim and his costar Ryu Hyun-kyung shot this film in 2021.

In 2023, Kim collaborated with Director Oh Chung-hwan for the third time and writer Park Hye-ryun for the second time in the tvN miniseries Castaway Diva. In the series, he portrayed the character of Lee Seo-joon, Ran-joo's former manager, who is now the CEO of RJ Entertainment.

If it's about ambition, then it's all about ambition. (laughs) One of the reasons I consistently take the stage in theater while engaging in media activities is because of the delicate balance of acting. If I lean too heavily towards either media or theater, I feel like my existence as an actor becomes precarious. It's akin to walking on a tightrope. Just like if you lean too much to one side while walking on a tightrope, you'll immediately fall off. For me, it's like walking a tightrope between media and theater. I strive to find a balance between the two, and that's why I make it a point to step onto the stage at least once a year. It's essential for me as an actor to maintain that balance and continue moving forward.

— The Musical Interview

Kim returned to the theater again. In May 2023, it was revealed that Kim, along with Park Jeong-bok and Kim Bada, had been cast in the roles of the free-spirited wanderer Walker and his father Ned in the play Three Days of Rain. Directed by Oh Man-seok, who previously directed the South Korean premiere in 2017, the play was performed at Dongguk University's Lee Hae-rang Arts Theater from July 25 to October 1.

== Other ventures ==
=== Endorsements ===
In 2016, Kim started working in the advertising industry and gained recognition for his role in the Canon Commercial directed by Shin Woo-seok and produced by Dolphiners Films. The advertisement went viral and received the Gold Award at the Seoul Video Advertising Festival. Kim became Shin's muse and continued to work together on various commercial projects. In due course, Shin became known as the "Bong Joon-ho of the advertising industry," and his production company, Dolphiners Films, established itself as a leader in crafting unique, groundbreaking, and unconventional commercials that attract millions of viewers.

Throughout 2018 and the first half of 2019, Kim appeared in advertisements for brands in IT, outdoor sports, food, games, finance, and telecommunication. He showcased his versatility by portraying different roles such as an astronaut, a baseball player, a general and Liu Bei of the Romance of the Three Kingdoms. Kim became highly sought after in the advertising industry.

In 2020, Kim was featured in a TV commercial for Shinsinpas Arex 2020 by Shinsin Pharmaceutical. In that same year, Kim had a starring role alongside Kim Go-eun in the 50-minute 8K short film titled 'Untact'. The film served as a showcase for Samsung's cutting-edge 8K technology and was a collaborative effort with renowned director Kim Jee-woon. 'Untact' provides viewers with an immersive and captivating experience, making use of Samsung QLED 8K TVs and shot using the Galaxy S20 Ultra.

In 2021, Kim participated in the SSG.com advertising campaign along with Gong Yoo, Gong Hyo-jin, Yoo Ji-tae, Yang Dong-geun, Park Hee-soon, and singer Hwang So-yoon. The campaign was in an omnibus style with five consecutively aired commercials, and the concept was an action noir film. In the same year, Kim, alongside Park Ho-san and Choi Moo-sung, appeared in the Binggrae Ice Cream Super Cone and Maru series advertisement 'Spear and Shield'. The advertisement featured a trial scene reminiscent of a courtroom drama, with Super Cone making an appearance as evidence and the girl group Oh My Girl appearing as witnesses. The captivating main scenes of the videos garnered significant attention, accumulating views starting from 500,000 to an impressive 5 million.

In January 2022, Kim partnered with actress Kim You-jung to star in a commercial created by Dolphiners Films for Laneige. The commercial quickly gained popularity, going viral and accumulating an impressive 1.45 million views within just 10 days of its release.

=== Philanthropy ===
In 2022, Kim joined a group of celebrities in participating in the Greenball Campaign to Save Abandoned Dogs, specifically the project titled 'Your Unworn Jeans Save Abandoned Dogs'. This project included a bazaar organized as part of the 'Dang Daeng King Green Ball Festival' event, which was jointly hosted by Greenball, a non-profit organization, and Joy News 24. The main aim of the bazaar was to sell jeans donated by celebrities, with all proceeds dedicated to supporting an abandoned animal shelter.

In 2023, Kim took on the role of a public relations ambassador for the 2023 Barrier Free Film Festival. As part of this festival, the closing film of the 23rd Jeonju International Film Festival, 'Full Time' directed by Eric Gravel, was adapted into a barrier-free version. The Barrier Free Film Committee collaborated with the Seoul Economic Promotion Agency (SBA) to record an audio commentary specifically tailored for the barrier-free edition of 'Full Time' in July. Kim, alongside Director Kim Hee-jung, lent his voice as a narrator for the production, offering his talent as a donation. Kim said, "The process of participating as a voice in a barrier-free film was a meaningful time in itself. I hope that more barrier-free films will be produced in the future."

== Filmography ==
=== Feature film ===
Feature film appearances
Year	Title		Role	Note	Ref.
Year	English	Korean	Role	Note	Ref.
2013	Way Back Home	집으로 가는 길	Seoul District Prosecutors' Office detective 2	Minor role	
2014	The Con Artists	기술자들	Suit 3	Minor role	
2014	Tazza: The Hidden Card	타짜: 신의 손	Ah-gwi's thug	Minor role	
2015	Planck Constant	플랑크 상수	Fitness Trainer	Minor role	
2015	The Accidental Detective	탐정: 더 비기닝	Gang leader	Minor role	
2016	A Violent Prosecutor	검사외전	Man	Minor role	
2016	Train to Busan	부산행	Baseball coach	Minor role	
2017	Coffee Mate	커피메이트	Male nurse	Minor role	
2017	Memoir of a Murderer	살인자의 기억법	Undercover detective 2	Minor role	
2018	The Princess and the Matchmaker	궁합	Yook Son		
2019	Welcome to the Guesthouse	어서오시게스트하우스	Gi-hoon		
2022	Fairy	요정	Ho-cheol		
2023	A Man of Reason	보호자	Jun-ho	Special appearance	
2023	When I Sleep	내가 누워있을 때	Hae-su		
2024	Mission: Cross	크로스	Joong-san		

=== Short film ===
Short film appearances
Year	Title		Role	Ref.
Year	English	Korean	Role	Ref.
2008	A Matter of Principal	원칙의 문제	Jeong-jae	
2012	The Metamorphosis	변신	Simon	
2015	Disappearance	실종	Min-su	
2017	88 Seoul	88 서울		
2019	Bank of Seoul	잠은행	Mr. Park	
2020	Untact	언택트	Sung-hyun	

=== Television series ===
Television appearances
Year	Title		Role	Notes	Ref.
Year	English	Korean	Role	Notes	Ref.
2016	Squad 38	38사기동대	Investigator Park		
2017	Argon	아르곤	An Jae-geun		
2018	Drama Special: Too Bright for Romance	드라마 스페셜 - 너무 한낮의 연애	Kim Hyung-suk	one act-drama	
2018	Drama Special: Dreamers	드라마 스페셜 시즌9 - 도피자들	Manager	one act-drama	
2018	Encounter	남자친구	Lee Dae-chan		
2019	Kill It	킬잇	Min-hyuk	Cameo (ep. 6)	
2019	Designated Survivor: 60 Days	60일, 지정생존자	Jung Han-mo		
2020–2023	Dr. Romantic	낭만닥터 김사부	Park Min-gook	Season 2–3	
2020	It's Okay to Not Be Okay	사이코지만 괜찮아	Lee Sang-in		
2020	Do Do Sol Sol La La Sol	도도솔솔라라솔	Cha Eun-seok		
2020	Start-Up	스타트업	Seo Chung-myung	Cameo (ep.1)	
2021	Drama Stage: EP, Hi Dorothy	EP, 안녕 도로시	Byeon Jung-hoo	One act-drama	
2021–2022	Now, We Are Breaking Up	지금, 헤어지는 중입니다	Seok Do-hoon		
2021–2022	Our Beloved Summer	그 해 우리는	Narrator Documentary	Cameo (episode 12)	
2022	Big Mouth	빅마우스	Choi Do-ha		
2022	Extraordinary Attorney Woo	이상한 변호사 우영우	Bae In-cheol	Cameo (ep.15–16)	
2023	Castaway Diva	무인도의 디바	Lee Seo-joon		
2023	Drama Special – The True Love of Madam	드라마 스페셜 2023 – 마님은 왜 마당쇠에게 고기를 주었나	Lee Jeong-yeol	one act-drama	
2024	Missing Crown Prince	세자가 사라졌다	Choi Sang-rok		
2025	When the Stars Gossip	별들에게 물어봐	Park Dong-ah		
2025	Our Unwritten Seoul	미지의 서울	Ho-soo's father	Cameo	
2026	Four Hands, Two Sonatas	포핸즈	Do Hyeon-soo		

=== Web series ===
Web series appearances
Year	Title		Role	Note	Ref.
Year	English	Korean	Role	Note	Ref.
2021	Dr. Brain	Dr. 브레인	Im Joon-gi		
2022	Juvenile Justice	소년 심판	Namkoong Yi-hwan	Special appearance (Ep. 4–6, 9–10)	
2022	Soundtrack #1	사운드트랙 #1	Woo-il		
2022	A Model Family	모범가족	Yoo Han-cheol	Special appearance	
2024	The Tyrant	폭군	Director Sa		

=== Music video appearances ===
Year	Title	Artist	Ref.
2023	"OMG"	New Jeans	

== Stage ==
=== Hosting ===
Year	Title	Notes	Ref.
2022	2022 Pyeongchang International Peace Film Festival	with Kim Gyu-ri	

=== Theater ===
Theater plays performances
Year	Title		Role	Theater	Date	Ref.
Year	English	Korean	Role	Theater	Date	Ref.
2007	Gangster No. 1	갱스터 No.1	Young gangster	Daehakro Arts Theater Tree and Water	August 8–September 30	
2009	Marat, Sade	마라, 사드	Luro	Sejong Center for the Performing Arts M Theater	May 29–Jun 14	
2009–2010	Whale	고래	Action Leader	Daehangno Information Theater	Dec 31–Jan 17	
2010	Never Sleepless Nights	잠 못드는 밤은 없다	Hayato	Doosan Art Center Space111	April 16–25	
2010	Space Chicken Opera	스페이스 치킨 오페라	Baba Anmali	Daehangno Guerrilla Theater	Jun 11–Jul 4	
2010	Morning Drama	아침 드라마	Man	Daehangno Guerrilla Theater	Nov 5–28	
2011	Like the First Time - Part 1 Hoe Daehangno Comedy Festival	처음처럼 - 제1회 대학로 코미디 페스티벌	Son	Small Theater Wilderness (Former Daehangno Arts Theater 3)	Jan 27-Feb 6	
2011	The King of Oedipus	오이디푸스 왕	Oedipus	Daehangno Information Theater	Mar 18–Apr 10	
2011	The Secret	속살	Hyeong-ki	Daehangno Information Theater	April 13–24	
2011	Never Sleepless Nights	잠 못드는 밤은 없다	Hayato	Doosan Art Center Space111	Nov 29-Dec 31	
2012	Raising the Sun in the Sky	하늘은 위에둥둥 태양을 들고	Yi Sang	Daegu Hanullim Small Theater	Aug 17-26	
2012	Mouse	쥐	Eldest Son	Old Studio 76	Nov 09-Dec 16	
2012	The Dead Man's Cell Phone	죽은 남자의 핸드폰	Gordon	Daehakro Arts Theater Small Theater	Jun 9-24	
2012	People Blooming as Flowers	사람 꽃으로 피다	Deok-yang	Goyang Aram Nuri Sara Sae Theater	Dec 21-30	
2013	Raising the Sun in the Sky	하늘은 위에둥둥 태양을 들고	Poet Yi-sang	Old Studio 76	Jan 2–20	
2013	Round and Go Round	돌고돌고	Chang-gae	Daegu Hanullim Small Theater	Aug 9–18	
2014	For Those Who Have a Hobby of Reading Different Stories	색다른 이야기 취미 읽기 취미를 가진 사람들	Dal-su	Lee Hae-Rang Arts Theater	Sep 18–27	
2014	Yo-Yo Phenomenon	요요현상	Park Cheol-min	Daehangno Guerrilla Theater	Nov 1–16	
2014	Hyung-min and Joo-young	형민이 주영이	Jo-young	Daehangno Guerrilla Theater	Dec 11–28	
2017	The Claimants of the Throne	왕위 주장자들	Håkon Håkonsson	Sejong Center for the Performing Arts M Theater	Mar 31–Apr 23	
2017	M. Butterfly	엠.버터플라이	Renee Gallimard	Art One Theater Hall 1	Sep 9–Dec 3	
2017–2018	Kiss of the Spider Woman	거미여인의 키스	Molina	Art One Theater Hall 2	December 5, 2017 – February 25, 2018	
2017–2018	Along the Rails, to the Red Sea of Kanna	레일을 따라, 붉은 칸나의 바다로	immigrant	Hongik University Daehangno Art Center Small Theater	Dec 29–Jan 6	
2018	Capone Trilogy	카포네 트릴로지	old man	Hongik University Daehangno Art Center Small Theater	Mar 20–Jun 17	
2018	Turn Around and Leave	돌아서서 떠나라	Sang San-doo	Bricks Theater (Old, Content Ground)	July 12–Oct 6	
2019	The Pride	프라이드	Phillip	Art One Theater Hall 2	May 25–Aug 25	
2019	Turn Around and Leave	돌아서서 떠나라	Sang San-doo	Bricks Theater (Old, Content Ground)	Oct 9–Nov 11	
2021–2022	Understudy	언더스터디	Harry	Seoul Arts Center Jayu Small Theater	Dec 21–Feb 27	
2022	The Invisible Hand	보이지 않는 손	Nick Bright	Art One Theater Hall 2	Apr 26–Jun 30	
2023	Three Days of Rain	3일간의 비	Ned / Walker	Dongguk University Lee Hae-rang Arts Theater	July 25 – October 1	

== Ambassadorship ==
- Barrier Free Film Ambassadors (2023)

== Awards and nominations ==
Name of the award ceremony, year presented, category, nominee of the award, and the result of the nomination
Award ceremony	Year	Category	Nominee / Work	Result	Ref.
KBS Drama Awards	2020	Best Supporting Actor	Do Do Sol Sol La La Sol; Drama Special – Traces of Love	Nominated	
MBC Drama Awards	2022	Excellence Award, Actor in a Miniseries	Big Mouth	Nominated	
SBS Drama Awards	2020	Best Supporting Actor	Dr. Romantic 2	Won	
SBS Drama Awards	2021	Excellence Award for an Actor in a Mini-Series Romance/Comedy Drama	Now, We Are Breaking Up	Won	
Two-person Play Festival	2013	Best Actor	Raising the Sun in the Sky	Won	
UAS IAFF Short Film Showdown (Note: The Urban Action Showcase International Action Film Festival)	2017	Best Actor	'88 Seoul	Won	
