= Yoon Seok-hyun =

South Korean actor (born 1983)

- 윤석현
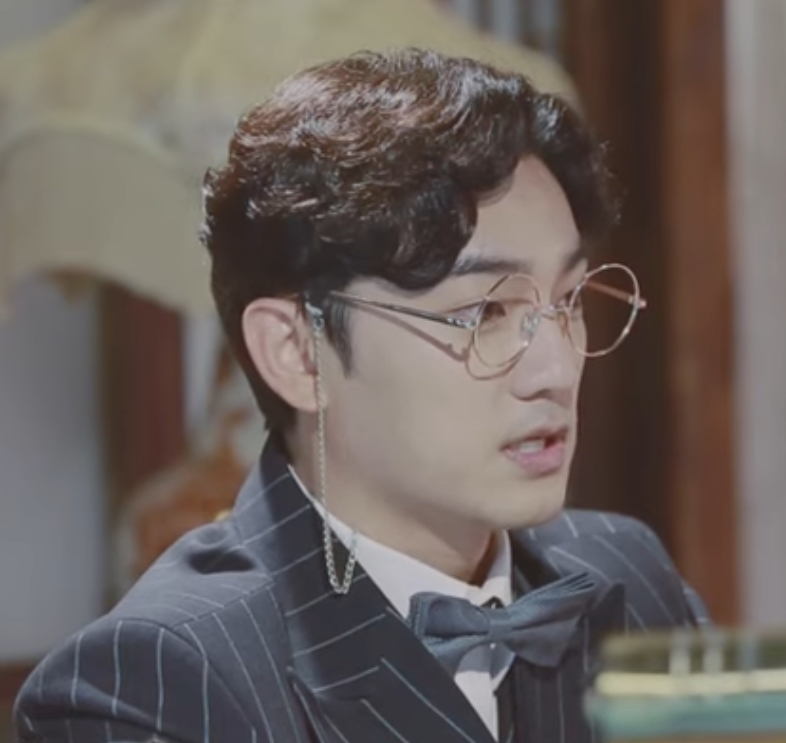
- Yoon in 2021
- Born: September 4, 1983 (age 43); Iksan, Jeollabuk-do, South Korea
- Other name: Yoon Seok-hyeon
- Education: Departement of Musical and Acting Kyungmin University
- Occupations: Musical actor; television actor
- Years active: 2004–present
- Agent: D Plan Entertainment
- Known for: Hometown Cha-Cha-Cha; Big Mouth

Korean name
- Hangul: 윤석현
- RR: Yun Seokhyeon
- MR: Yun Sŏkhyŏn

Yoon Seok-hyun (Korean: 윤석현; born September 4, 1983) is a South Korean actor. Yoon started acting on stage with musicals and plays, then ventured into small screen in 2021. He is best known for his role in television drama Hometown Cha-Cha-Cha (2021) and Big Mouth (2022).

== Early life and education ==
Yoon was born on September 4, 1983, in Iksan, Jeollabuk-do, South Korea. He attended Wonkwang High School, where he was a member of the baseball club. During his time in high school, an acting academy opened in the city, and Yoon enrolled too learn acting and pursue his dream of becoming a singer. After graduating from high school, he pursued his passion for acting by enrolling in the department of acting arts at Digital Seoul University of Culture and Arts. Following his graduation from the university, he furthered his education by studying music at Kyungmin University in Gyeonggi Province, where he obtained a bachelor's degree in music.

== Career ==
In 2004, Yoon made his debut as rapper Mingyu in the musical Sonagi, also known as Rain Shower, while attending Kyungmin University. Despite having a small role, his performance left a lasting impact. The musical, based on the novel by Hwang Soon-won and directed by Yoo Hee-seong, revolves around a vague memory of first love. Yoon also secured minor roles in the MBC musical I Forgot His Name.

In 2005, he was cast in the musical Love Quilt. Two years later, in 2007, Yoon joined the children's play The Dwarf Who Loved Snow White, where he portrayed both the prince and the dwarf Flower Dew. The play, which premiered in May 2001 at the Seoul Children's and Youth Performing Arts Festival, has consistently garnered praise from audiences and critics, selling out all seats every year. Directed by Park Seung-geol, the play is part of the U Theater Company's repertoire, with Park also being the co-author of the novel The Dwarf who Loved Snow White.

In 2008, Yoon was cast in an ensemble role in the musical Sound Thief. Over the next four years, he appeared in various musicals, including Hello Francesca (2008), The Brothers Were Brave (2009), Singles (2009), Oh! While You're Asleep (2010), Bachelor's Vegetable Shop 2.0 (2010), Monte Cristo (2011), and Special Letter (2011), in supporting roles.

Yoon's breakthrough came in 2012 when he landed his first leading role in the musical Proposal after a competitive audition process. With fellow actor Jung Uk-jin, Yoon won the role of Min-ho, a non-regular sports center instructor, beating out 200 other contestants for the part. He also secured the lead role of Kim Jong-wook in the sixth season of Finding Mr. Destiny the same year.

After six years, Yoon returned to the theater for his second play, Puzzle (2013), which is a Korean adaptation of the play Point of Death by British writer Michael Cooney. Yoon played the supporting role of Travis in alternating performances with two fellow actors, Won Jong-hwan and Park Ki-duk. The play was performed from September 7 to November 17, 2013, at the Daehak-ro Happy Theater.

Yoon made his television debut in 2015 with minor roles in the JTBC drama Last. Later appeared in the thriller film Missing 2 as Koo Sang-woo in 2017.

In 2018, Yoon auditioned for Musical Dwarf directed by Kim Dong-yeon and was cast as Dwarf Charlie.

In 2021, Yoon landed a supporting role in the tvN drama Hometown Cha-Cha-Cha through an audition, playing the character Choi Geum-cheol, the owner of a tool shop in Gongjin, who is also Du-sik's best friend and Bo-ra's father. Following the success of the drama, Yoon signed an exclusive contract with D-Plan Entertainment, marking the beginning of his active career in television.

== Personal life ==
Yoon and announcer Jung In-young, who have been in a relationship for a year, announced on January 17, 2023, that they will be tying the knot in Seoul on July 8. Their twin son and daughter were born in March 2024.

== Filmography ==
=== Film ===
Film performances
Year	Title		Role	Note	Ref.
Year	English	Korean	Role	Note	Ref.
2017	Missing 2	실종 2	Koh Sang-woo	minor role	

=== Television ===
Television drama performances
Year	Title		Role	Note	Ref.
Year	English	Korean	Role	Note	Ref.
2015	Last	라스트		minor role (JTBC drama)	
2021	Hometown Cha-Cha-Cha	갯마을 차차차	Choi Geum-cheol	Supporting Role (tvN drama)	
2022	Forecasting Love and Weather	기상청 사람들: 사내연애 잔혹사 편	Meteorological Agency Manager	Cameo (JTBC Drama)	
2022	Big Mouth	빅마우스	Cha Seung-tae	Supporting Role (MBC Drama)	
2023	The First Responders	소방서 옆 경찰서	Jo Doo-chil	Special Appearance	
2023	Crash Course in Romance	일타 스캔들	Song Jun-ho	Special Appearance	
2023	Taxi Driver 2	모범택시2	Sang-man	Special Appearance	
2023	Our Blooming Youth	청춘월담	Song Ga	Special Appearance	
2023	Not Others	남남	Oh Young-min		

== Stage ==
=== Musical ===
Musical performances
Year	Title		Role	Theater	Date	Ref.
Year	English	Korean	Role	Theater	Date	Ref.
2004	Rain Shower (Sonagi)	소나기	Min-gyu (rapper)	Konkuk University New Millennium Hall Grand Performance Hall	Sep 1 to October 24	
2005	MBC Musical Though I Forgot His Name	MBC 뮤지컬 ‘그 사람 이름은 잊었지만’	Minor Role	Sejong Center for the Performing Arts	Jan 28 to Feb 9	
2005	Love Quilt	러브퀼트	Byeong-gu	Daehak-ro In-a Small Theater	March 10 to 27	
2008	Sound Thief	소리도둑	ensemble	Hoam Art Hall	04.05–05.25	
2008	Sound Thief	소리도둑	ensemble	Busan Civic Center Grand Theater	06.14–06.15	
2008	Sound Thief	소리도둑	ensemble	CMB Expo Art Hall	06.21–06.22	
2008	Sound Thief – Daegu International Musical Festival	소리도둑	ensemble	Daegu Opera House	06.28–06.29	
2008	Hello Francesca	안녕, 프란체스카	Gong Ji-tae	The National Museum of Korea	09.12—10.26	
2008–2009	The Brothers were Brave	형제는 용감했다	Lee Sam-bong	Doosan Art Center Yonkang Hall	12.05–02.08	
2008–2010	oh! while you were sleeping	오! 당신이 잠든 사이	Dr. Lee	JTN Art Hall 4	11.04–02.28	
2009	The Brothers were Brave	형제는 용감했다	Lee Sam-bong	Gunpo Culture and Arts Center Suri Hall (Grand Performance Hall)	02.14—02.15	
2009	Singles	싱글즈	Park Soo-heon	Daegu Bongsan Cultural Center	05.01–05.31	
2009	Singles	싱글즈	Jung Joon	Haeundae Cultural Center Haeun Hall (Grand Performance Hall)	06.27–06.28	
2009	oh! while you were sleeping	오! 당신이 잠든 사이	Doctor Lee	Ayang Art Center (former Daegu Dong-gu Culture and Sports Center)	10.30–10.31	
2010	Organic Musical Bachelor's Vegetable Shop 2.0	유기농 뮤지컬 총각네 야채가게 2.0	Son Ji-hwan	CJ Azit Daehangno (formerly SM Art Hall)	January 15, 2010 – June 30, 2010	
2011	Monte Cristo	몬테크리스토	ensemble	Chungmu Art Hall Grand Theater	03-01 s.d 04–24	
2011	Special Letter	스페셜레터	Corporal Choi Ho-jung	CJ Hideout Daehak-ro (formerly SM Art Hall)	07.06 s.d 02.03	
2012	Proposal	프로포즈	Min-ho	Chungmu Art Center Medium Theater Black	07.07–08.05	
2012–2013	Finding Mr. Destiny	김종욱 찾기	Kim Jong-work (first love)	JTN Art Hall 1	10.23–02.17	
2012–2013	New love rides in the rain	뉴 사랑은 비를 타고	Lee Dong-ryeong	Baekam Art Hall	11.06–01.13	
2013–2014	The Dwarf Who Loves Snow White	백설공주를 사랑한 난장이	Prince, Flower Dew	Daejeon Arts Center Art Hall	02.22 ~02.23	
2013–2014	The Dwarf Who Loves Snow White	백설공주를 사랑한 난장이	Prince, Flower Dew	Ewha Women University Samsung Hall	12.03 ~01.19	
2014	The Dwarf Who Loves Snow White	백설공주를 사랑한 난장이	Prince, Flower Dew	Arko Arts Theater Grand Theater	01.24 ~02.19	
2014	The God Is Watching	여신님이 보고 계셔 – 고양	Jo Dong-hyeon	Doosan Art Center Yonkang Hall	04.26–07.27	
2014–2015	Bachelor's Vegetable Shop	총각네 야채가게	Son Ji-hwan	KT&G Sangsang Madang Daechi Art Hall	11.21–01.01	
2015	Musical Story Show 10th Anniversary with Lee Seok-jun	뮤지컬 이야기쇼 이석준과 함께 10주년	special appearance	LG Art Center	05.26–05.26	
2015	Finding Mr. Destiny	김종욱 찾기	Kim Jong-work (first love)	Daegu Bongsan Cultural Center Grand Performance Hall (Gaon Hall)	06.05–11.08	
2015	The God Is Watching	여신님이 보고 계셔	Jo Dong-hyeon	Uniplex Hall 1 (Grand Theater)	06.20–10.11	
2015	The God Is Watching	여신님이 보고 계셔	Jo Dong-hyeon	Goyang Oullim Nuri Oullim Theater	11.14–11.16	
2015	The God Is Watching	여신님이 보고 계셔	Jo Dong-hyeon	Incheon Art Hall Grand Performance Hall	11.20–11.21	
2017	Red Like The Sky	레드 라이크 더 스카이	Giulio	Chungmu Art Center Small Theater Blue	March 31, to April 1	
2017	The History of Jealousy	찌질의 역사	Noh Jun-seok	Yes 24 Stage 3	06.03–08.27	
2017–2018	Dwarf	난쟁이들	Charlie	Daehak-ro T.O.M. Hall 1	11.26–02.11	
2018	Legendary Little Basketball Team	전설의 리틀 농구단	Jong-woo	Art One Theater Hall 2	03.09–04.15	
2018–2019	Bad Boys	재생불량소년	Ban-seok	Daehakro Arts Theater Small Theater	12.23–01.20	
2020	Midnight	미드나잇	Man	Yes 24 Stage 3	04.11–06.28	
2020–2021	Me and Natasha and the White Donkey	나와 나타샤와 흰 당나귀	man	Chungmu Art Center Medium Theater Black	11.03–02.14	
2020–2021	Fan Letter	팬레터	Lee Tae-ju	COEX Atrium	12.10–03.20	

=== Theater ===
Theater performances
Year	Title		Role	Theater	Date	Ref.
Year	English	Korean	Role	Theater	Date	Ref.
2007	The Dwarf Who Loves Snow White	백설공주를 사랑한 난장이	Prince, Flower Dew	Daegu Bongsan Cultural Center Grand Performance Hall (Gaon Hall)	10.10 ~10.21	
2007	The Dwarf Who Loves Snow White	백설공주를 사랑한 난장이	Prince, Flower Dew	Cheongdam-dong You Theater	10.31 ~04.27	
2013	Puzzle	퍼즐	Travis	Happy Theater	09.07 ~11.17	
2014	Whimsical Romance	발칙한 로맨스	Gu Bong-pil	KONTENTZ BOX	05.16 ~10.31	
2015	Whimsical Romance	발칙한 로맨스	Gu Bong-pil	BNK Busan Bank Joeun Theater Hall 1	01.09 ~04.12	
2019	B Class	B클래스	Lee Soo-hyun	Daehakro Jayu Theater	03.08 ~06.23	
2019	Temple	템플	multi-roles	Goyang Aram Nuri Sara Sae Theater	10.11 ~10.13	
2020	Shall we go to karaoke and talk?	우리 노래방가서 얘기 좀 할까	Hee-jun	Seokyeong University Performing Arts Center SKON 1	02.08 ~03.08	
2020	Temple	템플	multi-roles	Uniplex Hall 1 (Grand Theater)	10.02 ~10.11	
2020	Temple	템플	multi-roles	Uijeongbu Arts Center Grand Theater	11.30–11.30	
2021	Me and Grandpa	나와 할아버지	Jun-hee	Art One Theater 3	03.05 ~04.18	
2021	Me and Grandpa	나와 할아버지	Jun-hee	Goyang Aram Nuri Sara Sae Theater	07.16 ~07.18	
2021	Temple	템플	multi-roles	Daehangno Arts Theater Grand Theater	09.03 ~09.29	
2021	Temple	템플	multi-roles	Gwangmyeong Civic Center Grand Theater	10.16 ~10.16	
