= Sexi Mong =

South Korean television series

- Hangul: 색시몽
- RR: Saeksimong
- MR: Saeksimong
- Genre: Crime
- Starring: Kim Ji-woo; Kang Eun-bi; Seo Young
- Country of origin: South Korea
- Original language: Korean
- No. of seasons: 2
- No. of episodes: 4

Original release
- Network: Home CGV

Sexi Mong (Korean: 색시몽) is a South Korean four-part drama that was aired on Channel CGV in 2007. It is about three private investigators who fight sex crimes.

== Cast ==
- Kim Ji-woo as Kwon Dong-eun
- Kang Eun-bi as Kang Han-na
- Seo Young as Oh Seon-jung
- Dokgo Joon as Wang Soo-chul
- Kim Tae-hoon as Yoon Jae-yi
- Jung Ye-ri
- Kim Sun-young
