= Seo Young =

South Korean actress (born 1984)

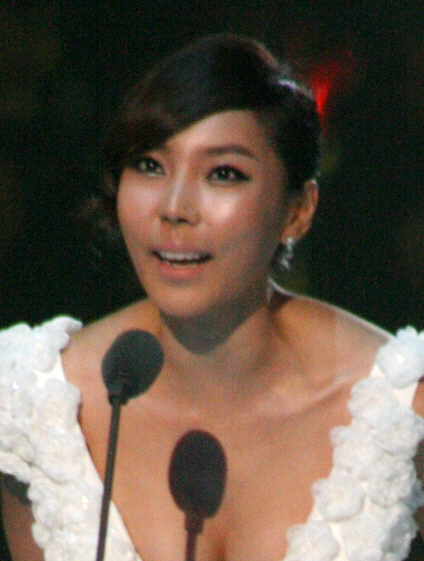
- Seo at the 2009 Mnet Asian Music Awards
- Born: Kim Seo-young; June 21, 1984 (age 42); Seoul, South Korea
- Education: Chung-Ang University
- Occupations: Actress; model
- Years active: 2006–present
- Agent: Star Flux (스타플럭스)
- Notable work: Seo Young's Spy
- Height: 1.73 m (5 ft 8 in)

Korean name
- Hangul: 서영
- RR: Seo Yeong
- MR: Sŏ Yŏng

Seo Young (Korean: 서영; born June 21, 1984) is a South Korean actress. She debuted in the 2006 Munhwa Broadcasting Corporation (MBC) drama What's Up Fox. In 2010, she started her own clothing store called Shine S.

== Career ==
=== Debut: 2006–2007 ===
Starring in the OCN four-part series Temptation of Eve, she appeared in Her Own Art (or Technique) which was the fourth part.

=== 2008–2010 ===
In a spin-off of 1 Night 2 Days, she appeared alongside Kim Sook, Yoo Chae-yeong, Kim Yi-ji and Mi-ra in 1 Night 2 Days of Beauty. A Tale of Legendary Libido: Appeared in the movie A Tale of Legendary Libido as Dan-bi, one of the many women trying to seduce the main character in the village.

=== 2011–present ===
She was cast as Mi-ra in the film Wonderful Radio.

== Filmography ==
=== Films ===
- 2007: Temptation of Eve: Her Own Art - Hye-young
- 2007: The Worst Man of My Life
- 2008: A Tale of Legendary Libido - Dan-bi
- 2011: Wonderful Radio - Mi-ra

=== Television series ===
- 2006: What's Up Fox - Lee Joo-hee
- 2007: Dal-ja's Spring
- 2007: Sexi Mong - Oh Seon-jung
- 2008: Seo Young's Spy
- 2010: Wish Upon a Star - Min-ah
- 2010: Roller Coaster Plus Date Big Bang - Seo-young
- 2010: Yaksha - Ji-hyang
- 2016: Dr. Romantic - Chairman Shin's assistant
- 2017: Manhole - Mi-ja
- 2020: Dr. Romantic 2 - Manager Joo (Ep. 15 & 16)
- 2025: Good Luck! - Jang-mi

=== Variety shows ===
- 2009: 1 Night 2 Days of Beauty
