= Lee Hyo-jung =

Lee Hyo-jung (Korean: 이효정; RR: I Hyojeong) may refer to:

- Lee Hyo-jung (actor) (Hanja: 李曉庭, born 1961), South Korean actor
- Lee Hyo-jung (badminton) (Hanja: 李孝貞, born 1981), South Korean badminton player
