= Now, We Are Breaking Up =

2021 South Korean romantic drama

- Promotional poster
- Hangul: 지금, 헤어지는 중입니다
- RR: Jigeum, heeojineun jungimnida
- MR: Chigŭm, heŏjinŭn chungimnida
- Genre: Romantic drama
- Created by: Kang Eun-kyung
- Developed by: Studio S (SBS); VIU (production investment)
- Written by: Je In
- Directed by: Lee Gil-bok
- Starring: Song Hye-kyo; Jang Ki-yong; Choi Hee-seo; Kim Joo-hun
- Country of origin: South Korea
- Original language: Korean
- No. of episodes: 16

Production
- Executive producers: Park Young-soo (SBS); Park Hyun-seo (CP)
- Producers: Ahn Je-hyun; Shin Sang-yoon; Jeong Cheol-seung
- Editor: Kim Yu-mi
- Running time: 70 minutes
- Production companies: Samhwa Networks; United Artists Agency
- Budget: ₩8.96 billion

Original release
- Network: SBS TV
- Release: November 12, 2021 – January 8, 2022

Now, We Are Breaking Up (Korean: 지금, 헤어지는 중입니다) is a South Korean romantic drama television series starring Song Hye-kyo, Jang Ki-yong, Oh Se-hun, Kim Joo-hun and Choi Hee-seo. Directed by Lee Gil-bok, with screenplay by Je In, and produced by Samhwa Networks and United Artists Agency, the series is about falling in love and breaking up between men and women. It premiered on SBS TV on November 12, 2021, and aired every Friday and Saturday at 22:00 (KST) till January 8, 2022.

== Synopsis ==
The series is story of love and break ups in the romantic world. It illustrates the present scenario in the context of fashion industry. Ha Yeong-eun (Song Hye-kyo) is a trendy team leader of design department of a fashion company called 'The One'. Yoon Jae-gook (Jang Ki-yong) is a successful freelance photographer.

== Cast and characters ==
=== Main ===
- Song Hye-kyo as Ha Yeong-eun

38 years old, daughter of Kang Jung-ja and Ha Taek-soo, and a close friend of Hwang Chi-sook and Jeon Mi-sook, design team leader of a fashion company called 'The One'. She falls in love with Yoon Jae-gook

- Jang Ki-yong as Yoon Jae-gook and Mr. J

32 years old, freelance fashion photographer

- Choi Hee-seo as Hwang Chi-sook

38 years old, design director of 'The One', the daughter of CEO Hwang, a high school classmate of Ha Young-eun and Jeon Mi-sook, and Hwang Chi-hyung's older sister. She falls in love with Seok Do-hoon

- Kim Joo-hun as Seok Do-hoon

40 years old, representative of the talented PR company at the center of the trend.

- Park Hyo-joo as Jeon Mi-sook

38 years old, Hwang Chi-sook and Ha Yeong-eun's high school classmate, and Kwak Soo-ho's wife. She gave up her career as a model to marry Kwak Soo-ho.

- Yoon Na-moo as Kwak Soo-ho

36 years old, deputy head of the planning team. Jeon Mi-sook's husband and Seok Do-hoon's colleague.

=== Supporting ===
==== People around 'The One' ====
- Joo Jin-mo as Representative Hwang

68 years old, Hwang Chi-sook's and Hwang Chi-hyung's father, CEO of 'The One', and a self-made man.

- Oh Se-hun as Hwang Chi-hyung

32 years old, new designer of 'The One' in the design team. He's the son of CEO Hwang and Hwang Chi-sook's younger brother.

- Jang Hyuk-jin as Go Gwang-soo

55 years old, head of the production department of 'The One'.

- Song Yoo-hyun as Oh In-ah

32 years old, head of the design team of 'Lamont', the second brand of 'The One'. Also the team leader of the launching brand 'Claire Mary'.

- Kim Bo-jeong as Nam Na-ri

30 years old, manager of the design team of 'The One'.

- Moon Joo-yeon as Ahn Seon-joo

29 years old, designer of Ha Yeong-eun's team, honest with her feelings and desires and expresses immediately.

- Ha Young as Jung So-young, 25 years old, youngest member of Sono's design team

==== People around Ha Yeong-eun ====
- Choi Hong-il as Ha Taek-soo

64 years old, middle school vice principal. He is about to retire in a month. He is Ha Young-eun's father.

- Nam Gi-ae as Kang Jeong-ja

67 years old, mother of Ha Young eun

==== People around the country ====
- Cha Hwa-yeon as Min Hye-ok

66 years old. Jaeguk's mother. The youngest daughter of a retail family

- Yoon Jung-hee as Shin Yoo-jeong

40 years old, an influencer with over 600,000 Instagram followers and the managing Director of Department Store 'Hills'.

=== Others ===
- Yura as Hye-rin

29 years old, the best celebrity of the era with numerous followers. Her real name is Yang Eun-hee

- Ki Eun-se as Seo Min-kyeong

33 years old. Vice President of Vision PR Marketing Team

- Kim Do-geon as Jimmy

The One's male casual advertising model

- Shin Dong-wook as Yoon Soo-wan

Yoon Jae Kook's older brother, who died in an accident 10 years ago, and Ha Young Eun's ex-boyfriend.

- Park Bo-kyung as Choi Ji-yeon

Once a colleague of Ha Young-eun at the fashion company 'The One', now the president of an LP bar. Her shop became Ha Young-eun's hideout

- Choi Hyo-eun as Lee Seong-min
- Lee Jung-gil as Yoon Seong-cheol, Jae-gook's father
- Kim Young-ah as Choi Hee-ja, A very close and special person who has been working with Ha Young-eun for a long time.

==== Special appearance ====
- Lee Do-yeop as Choi Kyung-chan
- Hwang Chan-sung as Kim Soo-min

== Production ==
Samhwa Networks has signed an ₩8.96 billion contract with StudioS (Subsidiary-SBS) to produce the drama, (560 million won per episode). Kang Eun-kyung is creator of the series.

On June 23, 2020, Huayi Brothers announced that Soo Ae has been offered to appear in the drama and she was considering the proposal, but eventually she declined. In November 2020, it was reported by United Artists Agency, Song Hye-kyo's management company, that she was considering to appear in the drama as protagonist. She last appeared in 2018 TV series Encounter. Yoon Jung-hee is returning to TV dramas after a hiatus of 7 years, she last starred in 2014 drama The Eldest. On 10 March, the line up of the cast appearing in the drama was confirmed as: Song Hye-kyo, Jang Ki-yong, Choi Hee-seo, Kim Joo-hun, Nam Gi-ae, Choi Hong-il, Joo Jin-mo, Cha Hwa-yeon, Jang Hyuk-jin, Song Yoo-hyun, Lee Joo-myung, Park Hyo-joo, Yoon Na-moo and Yoon Jung-hee. Ki Eun-se, Kim Do-geon, Yura, Oh Se-hun and Shin Dong-wook joined the cast later. On September 30, photos from script reading site were released for public.

=== Filming ===
Song Hye-kyo started filming for the drama in Seoul on April 9, 2021. This is her first project after a two year hiatus. The location shooting of the drama is taking place at Incheon Culture & Arts Center, located at Songdo International Business District. Art Center is set up as the headquarters of the fashion company 'The One', that forms the background of the story of the drama.

It was reported on July 20 that Yoon Jung-hee was confirmed for the Covid-19 contagion. As her schedule before confirmation didn't overlap, so filming was not stopped. Filming was finished on September 12, 2021. Production presentation of the series for promotion has been pre-recorded due to enlistment of actor Jang Ki-yong in August 2021, prior to release of the series.

=== Music ===
On November 8, original soundtrack line-up was revealed as:

- "You for a Moment" - Lee Mu-jin
- "Hold My Hand" - Lee Hi
- "Even the green season is meaningless to me" - Jung Seung-hwan
- "Only You" - Davichi
- "Street" - Urban Zakapa
- "Stay" - Car, the Garden
- "Because for Me, It's You" - Baekho (NU'EST)
- "Maybe It's Love" - Lee Min-hyuk and Bora Miyu-sing
- "The Season Called You" - 20 year old
- "I Miss You" - Song Yu-jin

== Release ==
The series premiered on November 12, 2021 and aired every Friday and Saturday at 22:00 (KST).

=== International broadcast ===
On June 1, 2021, SBS announced that the broadcasting rights for the drama Now, We Are Breaking Up were already sold in Japan. During the earning call, Viu announced that they will stream Now, We Are Breaking Up as part of Viu Original Series in November, following their previous releases such as River Where the Moon Rises and Doom at Your Service.

Samhwa Networks has reported earlier that they've sold the broadcasting rights to Viu parent company PCCW Media in Asian & MENA territories until August 4, 2031. Now, We Are Breaking Up is also available on Rakuten Viki on selected regions such as North America, South America, Europe, Oceana and India.

== Original soundtrack ==
Now, We Are Breaking Up

Soundtrack album by Various
- Released: 2021
- Genre: Soundtrack
- Languages: Korean; English
- Labels: NHN Bugs; Music Ground

=== Part 1 ===
Released on November 12, 2021
No.	Title	Lyrics	Music	Artist	Length
1.	"Your Season" (너라는 계절)	U.je, ZigZag Note, Eunjong Noh	ZigZag Note, Eunjong Noh, U.je	Twenty	3:42
2.	"Your Season" (instrumental)		ZigZag Note, Eunjong Noh, U.je		3:42

=== Part 2 ===
Released on November 14, 2021
No.	Title	Lyrics	Music	Artist	Length
1.	"Hold My Hand" (손을 잡아줘요)	Who Am I (Jang Hee-won, Enchanter)	Who I Am (Jang Hee-won, Enchanter)	Lee Hi	3:30
2.	"Hold My Hand" (instrumental)		Who I Am (Jang Hee-won, Enchanter)		3:30

=== Part 3 ===
Released on November 19, 2021
No.	Title	Lyrics	Music	Artist	Length
1.	"The Only Reason" (오로지 그대)	Aiming (Changrak Kim, Soobin Kim)	Aiming (Changrak Kim, Soobin Kim)	Davichi	4:03
2.	"The Only Reason" (instrumental)				4:03

=== Part 4 ===
Released on November 21, 2021
No.	Title	Lyrics	Music	Artist	Length
1.	"Because You're Not Here" (푸르른 계절도 내겐 의미 없어요)	Han Kyungsoo	Kyungsoo Han, Dohyeong Lee (Lohi)	Jeong Seung-hwan	4:49
2.	"Because You're Not Here" (instrumental)		Kyungsoo Han, Dohyeong Lee(Lohi)		4:49

=== Part 5 ===
Released on November 26, 2021
No.	Title	Lyrics	Music	Artist	Length
1.	"I Miss You"	AIMING (Changrak Kim, Soobin Kim)	AIMING (Kim Changrak, Kim Soo-bin)	Song Yoo-jin	4:13
2.	"I Miss You" (instrumental)		Aiming (Kim Changrak, Kim Soo-bin)		4:13

=== Part 6 ===
Released on November 28, 2021
No.	Title	Lyrics	Music	Artist	Length
1.	"Stay"	Park Sol	Park Sol	Car, the Garden	4:01
2.	"Stay" (instrumental)		Park Sol		4:01

=== Part 7 ===
Released on December 3, 2021
No.	Title	Lyrics	Music	Artist	Length
1.	"Ing..."	Hana	Psycho Tension (YEJUN, Lee Ha-eun)	Lee Min-hyuk, Bora Miyu	4:00
2.	"Ing...." (instrumental)		Psycho Tension (YEJUN, Lee Ha-eun)		4:00

=== Part 8 ===
Released on December 5, 2021
No.	Title	Lyrics	Music	Artist	Length
1.	"Between Us"	Kwon Soonil, James Son	Kwon Soonil, James Son	Urban Zakapa	4:01
2.	"Between Us" (instrumental)		Kwon Soonil, James Son		4:01

=== Part 9 ===
Released on December 12, 2021
No.	Title	Lyrics	Music	Artist	Length
1.	"Come Rest With Me" (그대 잠시 내게)	Jeon Geun-hwa	Jeon Geun-hwa, Jeong Jin-wook	Lee Mu-jin	4:07
2.	"Come Rest With Me" (instrumental)		Jeon Geun-hwa, Jeong Jin-wook		4:07

=== Part 10 ===
Released on December 19, 2021
No.	Title	Lyrics	Music	Artist	Length
1.	"Because I am You" (나는 너라서)	Baekho (NU'EST)	Jeon-ni	Baekho (NU'EST)	3:35
2.	"Because I am You" (instrumental)		Jeon-ni		3:35

=== Part 11 ===
Released on January 4, 2022
No.	Title	Lyrics	Music	Artist	Length
1.	"When We're Together"	Michele Wylen	Kim Ji-soo, Isaac	Shorelle	3:47
2.	"When We're Together" (instrumental)		Kim Ji-soo, Isaac		3:47

== Viewership ==
Audience response

Now, We Are Breaking Up : South Korea viewers per episode (millions)

Season	Episode number																Average
Season	1	2	3	4	5	6	7	8	9	10	11	12	13	14	15	16	Average
1	1.146	1.503	1.285	1.454	1.249	1.327	1.174	1.264	1.216	1.153	1.091	1.004	0.851	N/A	1.182	1.363	N/A

Source: Audience measurement performed nationwide by Nielsen Korea.

Ep.	Broadcast date	Average audience share		
Ep.	Broadcast date	Nielsen Korea		TNmS
Ep.	Broadcast date	Nationwide	Seoul	Nationwide
1	November 12, 2021	6.4% (8th)	6.6% (7th)	—N/a
2	November 13, 2021	8.0% (3rd)	9.0% (3rd)	6.8% (4th)
3	November 19, 2021	7.3% (7th)	7.3% (6th)	5.5% (12th)
4	November 20, 2021	7.9% (2nd)	8.5% (2nd)	5.7% (14th)
5	November 26, 2021	7.0% (9th)	7.5% (6th)	5.3% (14th)
6	November 27, 2021	7.6% (4th)	8.4% (3rd)	—N/a
7	December 3, 2021	6.4% (10th)	6.9% (9th)	—N/a
8	December 4, 2021	6.9% (8th)	7.4% (6th)	5.0%(14th)
9	December 10, 2021	6.9% (10th)	7.5% (8th)	5.2% (13th)
10	December 11, 2021	6.8% (9th)	7.5% (8th)	5.4% (16th)
11	December 17, 2021	6.5% (13th)	6.9% (13th)	4.4% (19th)
12	December 24, 2021 (Note: Due to broadcast of SBS Entertainment Awards, the episode 12 will be aired on December 24, 2021.)	5.7% (14th)	6.3% (11th)	—N/a
13	December 25, 2021	4.9% (20th)	5.5% (11th)	—N/a
14	January 1, 2022	4.2% (22nd)	4.6% (19th)	—N/a
15	January 7, 2022	6.8% (12th)	6.8% (12th)	5.3% (14th)
16	January 8, 2022	6.7% (10th)	7.1% (8th)	4.9% (14th)
Average		6.6%	7.1%	—
In the table above, the blue numbers represent the lowest ratings and the red numbers represent the highest ratings.; NR denotes that the series did not rank in the top 20 daily programs on that date.; N/A denotes that the rating is not known.

== Awards and nominations ==
Year	Award	Category	Recipient	Result	Ref.
2021	SBS Drama Awards	Best Couple Award	Jang Ki-yong & Song Hye-kyo	Nominated	
2021	SBS Drama Awards	Grand Prize (Daesang)	Song Hye-kyo	Nominated	
2021	SBS Drama Awards	Excellence Award for an Actor in a Mini-Series Romance/Comedy Drama	Kim Joo-hun	Won	
2021	SBS Drama Awards	Best Supporting Actress in a Mini-Series Romance/Comedy Drama	Park Hyo-joo	Won	
2021	SBS Drama Awards	Best Character Award, Actress	Choi Hee-seo	Nominated	
2021	SBS Drama Awards	Top Excellence Award, Actor in a Miniseries Romance/Comedy Drama	Jang Ki-yong	Nominated	
2021	SBS Drama Awards	Top Excellence Award, Actress in a Miniseries Romance/Comedy Drama	Song Hye-kyo	Nominated	
2021	SBS Drama Awards	Excellence Award for an Actress in a Mini-Series Romance/Comedy Drama	Choi Hee-seo	Nominated	
2021	SBS Drama Awards	Best Supporting Actor in a Mini-Series Romance/Comedy Drama	Jang Hyuk-jin	Nominated	
