= My Mother Is a Daughter-in-law =

2015 South Korean television series

- Promotional poster
- Also known as: The Mother and the Daughter-in-law
- Hangul: 어머님은 내 며느리
- RR: Eomeonimeun nae myeoneuri
- MR: Ŏmŏnimŭn nae myŏnŭri
- Genre: Melodrama; Romance; Family; Comedy
- Screenplay by: Lee Geun-young
- Directed by: Go Heung-shik
- Starring: Kim Hye-ri; Shim Yi-young; Kim Jeong-hyeon
- Country of origin: South Korea
- Original language: Korean
- No. of episodes: 136

Production
- Executive producer: Kim Jong-shik
- Running time: 40 minutes every Mondays to Fridays at 08:30 (KST)
- Production company: iWill Media

Original release
- Network: SBS
- Release: June 22 – December 31, 2015

My Mother Is a Daughter-in-law (Korean: 어머님은 내 며느리; RR: Eomeonimeun nae myeoneuri; lit. My Mother Is My Daughter-in-law) is a 2015 South Korean morning comedy-drama series broadcast by SBS starring Kim Hye-ri, Shim Yi-young and Kim Jeong-hyeon. The program premiered on June 22, 2015, and ended on December 31, 2015, airing every Monday to Friday at 8:30am for 136 episodes.

== Synopsis ==
Gyeong-sook (Kim Hye-ri) married a wealthy older man when she was 19 years old. After the passing of her antagonistic mother-in-law and the recent death of her husband, she depends on her son Jung-soo (Lee Yong-joon), who is a doctor.

Gyeong-sook disapproves of his girlfriend Hyun-joo because of her poor family background. Nevertheless, Jung-soo and Hyun-joo marry. Gyeong-sook antagonizes her new daughter-in-law. After Jung-soo dies in a car accident, Gyeong-sook and Hyun-joo are no longer family.

Both Gyeong-sook and Hyun-joo eventually remarry. Through a twist of fate, Gyeong-sook becomes Hyun-joo's daughter-in-law.

== Cast and characters ==
=== Main cast ===
- Kim Hye-ri as Chu Gyeong-sook
- Shim Yi-young as Yoo Hyun-joo
- Kim Jeong-hyeon as Jang Seong-tae

=== Supporting cast ===
- Lee Yong-joon as Kim Jeong-soo
- Moon Bo-ryung as Kim Soo-kyung
- Oh Young-sil as Kim Yeom-soon
- Kwon Jae-hee as Seo Mi-ja
- Choi Sung-ho as Yoo Jae-yong
- Lee Jin-ah as Kang Eun-hye
- Go Na-hee as Candy Yoo
- Son Jang-woo as Kim Dong-woo
- Han Mi-sook as Go Young-seon
- Kim Na-mi as Mi Yeon
- Kwon Seong-deok as Yang Moon-tak
- Lee Han-wi as Park Bong-joo
- Kim Tae-young as Im Jeong-bae
- Lee Seon-ho as Joo Kyeong-min
- Kim Dong-gyun as Gap Boo-jang
- Seong Chang-hoon as Song Yoo-sik
- Han Ji-an as Jeon Eul-hee
- Jo Eun-bit as Jo Kyung

=== Extended cast ===
- Kim Na-young as Im Jeong-ok
- Kang Seo-joon as Baek Chang-seok
- Jung Geun as Nam Young-gook
- Won Geun-hee
- Won Jong-rye as Joo Kyung-min's mother
- Yoo Joo-won

=== Cameo appearance ===
- Lee Yong-joon as psychic medium
- Yoon Hyun-jin as new anchor

== Awards and nominations ==
- 2015 SBS Drama Awards Special actor (weekend/daily series): Lee Han-wi
