= Loving You a Thousand Times =

- Promotional poster
- Also known as: Love You a Thousand Times; I Love You Ten Million Times
- Genre: Drama; Romance
- Written by: Kim Sa-kyung
- Directed by: Kim Jun-min
- Starring: Lee Soo-kyung; Jung Gyu-woon; Ryu Jin; Ko Eun-mi; Lee Si-young
- Country of origin: South Korea
- Original language: Korean
- No. of episodes: 55

Production
- Executive producer: Lee Hyun-shik
- Producer: Oh Sung-min
- Production location: South Korea
- Running time: Saturdays and Sundays at 20:50 (KST)
- Production company: GnG Production

Original release
- Network: Seoul Broadcasting System
- Release: 29 August 2009 – 7 March 2010

Loving You a Thousand Times (Korean: 천만번 사랑해; RR: Cheonmanbeon saranghae; lit. I Love You Ten Million Times) is a South Korean television series starring Lee Soo-kyung, Jung Gyu-woon, Ko Eun-mi, Ryu Jin and Lee Si-young. It aired on SBS from August 29, 2009 to March 7, 2010 on Saturdays and Sundays at 20:50 for 55 episodes.

== Cast ==
=== Main characters ===
- Lee Soo-kyung as Go Eun-nim
- Jung Gyu-woon as Baek Kang-ho
- Ko Eun-mi as Lee Sun-young
- Ryu Jin as Baek Sae-hoon

=== Supporting characters ===
Go family

- Kil Yong-woo as Go In-duk
- Lee Mi-young as Park Ae-rang
- Park Soo-jin as Oh Nan-jung
- Lee Joo-shil as Choi Shim-duk
- Baek Jin-hee as Go Eun-jung

Baek family

- No Young-kook as Baek Il
- Lee Hwi-hyang as Son Hyang-sook
- Sa Mi-ja as Ji Ok-sun
- Lee Di-el as Baek Yoo-bin

Lee family

- Kim Chung as Kim Chung-ja
- Bang Eun-hee as Yoon So-wol
- Kim Hee-chul as Lee Chul

Extended cast

- Lee Si-young as Hong Yeon-hee
- Kwon Eun-ah as So Geum-ja
- Kim Jin-soo as PD Bong
- Jin Ye-sol as Park Soo-jung
- Park Young-ji as President Park
- Min Ji-oh

== See also ==
- Seoul Broadcasting System
- List of South Korean television series
