= Nonstop (South Korean TV series) =

2000–2006 South Korean sitcom

- Nonstop 5 promotional poster
- Also known as: NEW Nonstop; Nonstop 3 Nonstop 4 Nonstop 5 Rainbow Romance
- Hangul: 논스톱
- RR: Nonseutop
- MR: Nonsŭt'op
- Genre: Comedy, drama, romance
- Country of origin: South Korea
- Original language: Korean
- No. of seasons: 6
- No. of episodes: 2185

Original release
- Network: MBC
- Release: May 15, 2000 – November 3, 2006

Related
- Nonstop (2009, China)

Nonstop (Korean: 논스톱) is a South Korean sitcom that broadcast its first season in 2000 on MBC. It continued for five more seasons until 2006. Set largely among university students, the series featured many young actors and singers early in their careers; Zo In-sung, for example, rose to popularity through the second season, New Nonstop.

== Cast ==
=== Season 1 (Nonstop) ===
- Jennifer Lee
- Lee Min-woo
- Yang Dong-geun
- Lee Jae-eun
- Go Soo
- Kim Jung-hyun
- Kim Hyo-jin
- Baek Il-seob
- Kim Hyung-ja
- Yeon Jung-hoon
- Kim Ji-young

=== Season 2 (NEW Nonstop) ===
Returning cast

- Jennifer Lee (season 1)
- Lee Min-woo (season 1)
- Yang Dong-geun (season 1)

New cast

- Zo In-sung
- Jeong Da-bin
- Park Kyung-lim
- Chun Jung-myung
- Jang Na-ra
- Kim Young-joon
- Lee Do-eun
- Yang Mi-ra
- Lee Kyung-kyu
- Kim Jung-hwa
- Seo Kwon-soon
- Kim Ki-hyun
- g.o.d

Special Guest

- Kim Sung-eun (ep. 399 and 405)

=== Season 3 (Nonstop 3) ===
Returning cast

- Kim Hyo-jin (season 1)
- Jeong Da-bin (season 2)
- Kim Jung-hwa (season 2)

New cast

- Choi Min-yong
- Jung Tae-woo
- Ha Dong-hoon
- Jo Han-sun
- Yeo Wook-hwan
- Lee Jin
- Kim Young-ah
- Lim Ju-hwan as Blind date
- Jung Won-joong
- Dana
- Son Dam-bi
- Hwang Ji-hyun
- Kim Ji-hoon
- Jo Sung-gil
- Kwon Se-eun

=== Season 4 (Nonstop 4) ===
Returning cast

- Jo Sung-gil (season 3)

New cast

- Andy Lee
- Hyun Bin
- Jang Keun-suk
- Oh Seung-eun
- Han Ye-seul
- Lee Young-eun
- Lee Yoon-ji
- Yoon Jong-shin
- MC Mong
- Bong Tae-gyu
- Ye Hak-yong
- Kim Bo-ri
- Jun Jin
- Kim Jae-seung
- Jung Sung-woon
- Lee Yoo-jung
- Kim Hyo-seo
- Han Yeo-reum
- Jin Seo-yun
- Choi Ji-yun
- Jang Mi-inae

Special guest

- Lee Joon-gi
- Yoon Jung-hee
- Jang Na-ra (Episode 113)

=== Season 5 (Nonstop 5) ===
Returning cast

- Choi Ji-yun (season 4)

New cast

- Kim Yong-man
- Jung Hyung-don
- Lee Jung
- Kang Kyung-joon
- Park Jin-woo
- Lee Min-woo
- Tablo
- Jo Jung-rin
- Lee Seung-gi
- Koo Hye-sun
- Hong Soo-ah
- Han Hyo-joo

Special guests

- Song Ha-yoon (Note: Credited as Kim Byul.)
- Lee Min-ho
- MC Mong
- Chae Young-in
- Kim Bo-ri
- Seo Ji-hee
- Kim Hyun-joong as Kim Hyun-joong
- Kim Ji-seok
- Jin Goo
- Kim Ji-woo
- Jang Ah-young
- Jang Mi-inae
- Jung Joo-hee
- SS501
- Kim Ki-hyun
- Han Ye-seul

=== Season 6 (Rainbow Romance) ===
New cast

- Kang Eun-bi
- Kim Ki-bum
- Kim Hee-chul
- Lee Min-ki
- Jung Eui-chul
- Hwang Bo-ra
- Suh Jae-kyung
- Park Hee-von
- Kim Hyung-min
- Lee Sang-mi
- Noh Hong-chul
- Park Hee-jin
- Uhm Hyun-kyung
- Chun Myung-hoon
- Kim Chang-wan
- Lim Eun-kyung
- Lee Ahyumi
- Go Eun-ah
- Yoon Eun-hye
- Yoon Do-hyun
- Lee Ji-ah

Special guests

- Park Soo-jin
- Ha Dong-hoon
- Seo Ji-young
- Park Myung-soo
- Han Geng
- Eunhyuk
- TVXQ
- Bae Seul-ki
- Kim Hyo-jin
- Jang Mi-inae
- Choi Won-joon
- Lee Eun-jung
- Yoon Seung-ah
- Jung Ji-in
- Sung Eun
- Ahn Sang-tae
- Choi Jin-hyuk (Note: Credited as Kim Tae-ho)

== Legacy ==
In October 2018, MBC aired the special documentary Youth Documentary: Twenty Again (청춘다큐 다시, 스물), in which Park Kyung-lim reunited with her New Nonstop co-stars, including Zo In-sung, Jang Na-ra, Yang Dong-geun, Lee Min-woo, Kim Jung-hwa and Jung Tae-woo, to reflect on their time on the show. Zo recalled that the series had allowed him to experience the ordinary university life his busy schedule had denied him. The special recorded a 3.2% rating in the Seoul metropolitan area.

== Original soundtrack ==
=== Nonstop 4 OST ===
Released on May 20, 2004
No.	Title	Artist	Length
1.	"Sky High" (with Epik High)	Nonstop Band	4:01
2.	"My Other Side" (처음보는 나)	Bong Tae-gyu	4:14
3.	"Nonbaen Song" (논밴송)	Nonstop Band	3:16
4.	"DoDo"	Haru	3:09
5.	"Your Name" (너의 이름)	Seo El	4:56
6.	"You Are Different" (그댄 달라요)	Han Ye-seul	3:38
7.	"Happy, Happy Birthday"	Nonstop Band	4:18
8.	"Let's Get Down" (with Joosuc)	Jang Keun-suk	3:01
9.	"Happy Days"	Lee Yoon-ji	4:48
10.	"She" (그녀)	Yoon Hwa	4:13
11.	"Just Before Confessing" (고백을 앞두고)	Yoon Jong-shin	3:51
12.	"We're Here" (우리가 있잖아)	Nonstop Band	3:59

=== Nonstop 5 OST ===
Released on September 21, 2005
No.	Title	Artist	Length
1.	"Oh~ Party Tonight~!!!" (featuring full cast and Epik High)	J.Lee	4:28
2.	"So That There's No Goodbye" (이별이 오지 못하게)	Hong Soo-ah	4:17
3.	"It's The First Time" (처음이었어요)	Han Hyo-joo	3:57
4.	"I Guess I Love You" (사랑하나봐요)	Kang Kyung-joon	3:41
5.	"Happy Birthday to You"	Koo Hye-sun	3:01
6.	"Love Two" (사랑 Two)	Jung Hyung-don	5:08
7.	"Deep Sigh" (한숨만)	J.Lee	4:50
8.	"un-touch-able"	Lee Min-woo	4:26
9.	"Peace Day" (평화의 날)	Epik High	3:51
10.	"Superman (It's Not Easy)"	Five for Fighting	3:41
11.	"Carcrashes"	Standfast	3:28
12.	"Santa Cruz (You're Not That Far)"	The Thrills	4:13
13.	"Again"	Faith Evans	3:18
14.	"Wouldn't It Be Nice"	The Beach Boys	2:33
15.	"Heart of Glass"	Skye Sweetnam	3:03
16.	"Jerk It Out"	Caesars	3:15
17.	"Silent Like The Rain"	Get Ready!	4:10

== Awards ==
Year	Award-Giving Body	Category	Work	Recipient	Result
2004	Mnet Asian Music Awards	Best OST	"You Are Different"	Han Ye-seul	Nominated
