= Park Ah-in =

South Korean actress (born 1985)

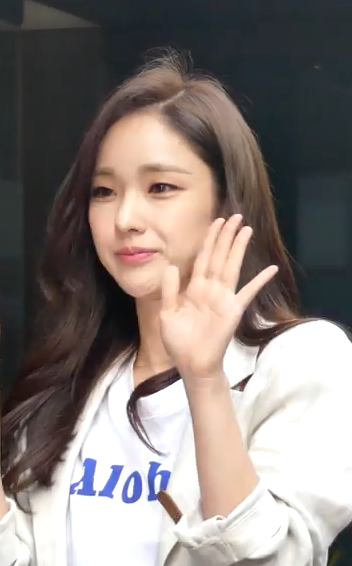
- Park in May 2019
- Born: 12 February 1985 (age 41); Busan, South Korea
- Education: Chung-Ang University - BA in Theater Studies
- Occupations: Actress; stage actress
- Years active: 2006–present
- Agent: Beyond J

Korean name
- Hangul: 박아인
- RR: Bak Ain
- MR: Pak Ain

Park Ah-in (Korean: 박아인; born 12 February 1985) is a South Korean actress. She is an alumna of Chung-Ang University, Department of Theater and Film, where she earned a bachelor's degree in Theater Studies. She made her acting debut in 2006 in the horror film Forbidden Floor and since then has appeared in a number of films and television series, including Loner (2008), A Gentleman's Dignity (2012), Descendants of the Sun (2016), Vagabond (2019), Never Twice (2019) and Kkondae Intern (2020).

== Early life and marriage ==
Park was born in Busan, South Korea, and graduated from the Department of Theater and Film at Chung-Ang University. She got married on November 7, 2020, at the Oksu-dong Cathedral in Seongdong District, Seoul, her spouse being unrelated to the entertainment industry.

== Career ==
Park started her acting career with the horror film Forbidden Floor in 2006.

In 2008, she took on the role of policewoman Hanakoin in a stage play Atami Murder Case organized by the Chung-Ang University Performing Film Arts Center.

In 2016, she was cast in the award-winning and popular show of the year Descendants of the Sun as Kim Eun-ji, a thoracic surgery specialist. The same year she also appeared in the mystery thriller Babysitter and another award-winning tvN drama The Good Wife.

In 2018, she starred in tvN's historical romance Mr. Sunshine, where she portrayed a woman who is unable to bear a child so she is regularly abused by her husband. The drama was praised by Park Jin-hai of The Korea Times for its strong female characters.

In 2019, she played Lily, an assassin in the spy crime-thriller Vagabond. For her portrayal of an assassin, she was nominated in the Best New Actress category for SBS Drama Awards. In the same year she also portrayed a Korean version of Paris Hilton as the granddaughter of the chairman and founder of Guseong Hotel, where she also is the head of marketing, in MBC's comedy drama Never Twice.

In 2020, Park appeared as Tak Jeong-eun, a 5-year contract worker of the Marketing Department at Joon Soo Foods, in Kkondae Intern, an MBC TV drama broadcast from May - June, 2020. In the same year she made her first variety show appearance on SBS's comedy show Park-Jang's LOL.

== Filmography ==
=== Films ===
Key
| † | Denotes films that have not yet been released |

| Year | Title | Role | Notes | Ref. |
|---|---|---|---|---|
| 2006 | Forbidden Floor | | | |
| 2008 | Loner | | | |
| 2010 | Outlaw | Woman with no brain | | |
| 2012 | Project 577 | Self | | |
| 2013 | Top Star | Won-joon's female junior colleague 2 | | |
| 2013 | Friends 2 | Female singer | | |
| 2019 | Hoop It Up | Yoo-jin | | |

=== Television series ===
Key
| † | Denotes television productions that have not yet been released |

| Year | Title | Role | Notes | Ref. |
|---|---|---|---|---|
| 2010 | Bad Man | Da-rim | | |
| 2012 | A Gentleman's Dignity | Attorney Kang | | |
| 2014 | Mama | Suzy | | |
| 2014 | Discovery of Love | Da-yeon | | |
| 2016 | Descendants of the Sun | Kim Eun-ji (Thoracic Surgery Specialist) | | |
| 2016 | Babysitter | | | |
| 2016 | The Good Wife | Lee Yeon-joo – lawyer | | |
| 2017 | Manhole | Park Young-joo | | |
| 2018 | Mr. Sunshine | Go Ae-soon | | |
| 2018-19 | Clean with Passion for Now | Lee Young-eun, woman in office cleaned by Oh-sol (Ep. 3) | Special appearance | |
| 2018-19 | My Strange Hero | Yang Min-ji | | |
| 2019 | He Is Psychometric | | | |
| 2019 | Welcome to Waikiki 2 | Da-young (Ep. 5) | Special appearance | |
| 2019 | My Absolute Boyfriend | | | |
| 2019 | Vagabond | Lily, an assassin hired by Jessica | | |
| 2019-20 | Never Twice | Na Hae-ri | | |
| 2020 | Kkondae Intern | Tak Jung-eun | | |
| 2020 | Sweet Home | The girl next door | Guest appearance | |
| 2021 | Moonshine | Woon Shim | | |
| 2024 | Wedding Impossible | Choi Seung-ah | | |
| 2026 | Sold Out on You | Ji Yun-ji | | |
| 2026 | Love In Disguise | Yoon Na-jung | | |

=== Television show ===
| Year | Title | Hangul | Notes | Ref. |
|---|---|---|---|---|
| 2020 | Park-Jang's LOL | 박장데소 | Debut | |

== Awards and nominations ==
| Year | Award | Category | Work | Result | Ref. |
|---|---|---|---|---|---|
| 2019 | SBS Drama Awards | Best Supporting Team -with Park Ah-in, Choi Dae-chul, Kim Jung-hyun and Moon Jeong-hee | Vagabond | Nominated | |
| 2019 | SBS Drama Awards | Best New Actress | Vagabond | Nominated | |
