= Choi Bae-young =

South Korean actress (born 1990)

- Born: January 22, 1990 (age 36); Gwangmyeong, South Korea
- Education: Korea National University of Arts – Acting Department
- Occupation: Actress
- Years active: 2008–present
- Agent: HB Entertainment

Korean name
- Hangul: 최배영
- Hanja: 崔陪榮
- RR: Choe Baeyeong
- MR: Ch'oe Paeyŏng

Choi Bae-young (Korean: 최배영; born January 22, 1990) is a South Korean actress.

Watching Korean dramas with her grandmother when she was a child, she grew interested in arts and entertainment, and dreamed of being an actress or a film director. When she was in high school, her father suggested her to try acting. She then enrolled in the Acting Department of the Korea National University of Arts and started auditioning, at first without an agency.

She made her debut through several theater and independent films, and drew attention in 2015 with her role in Great Stories: Kim Sisters. In April 2016 she became an ambassador for Friends of Hope.

== Filmography ==
=== Film ===
Year	Title	Role	Notes
2008	Radio Dayz	Listener #3	Cameo
2008	Death Bell	Park Hyun-kyung	
2012	Cutie Unstoppable	En-gyo	
2012	Nowhere Boy	Joo-eun	
2014	Gyeongju	Young fortune teller / High school girl	
2014	The Sea of Tranquility	Won-kyung	
2014	Yong-soon's Summer	Yong-soon	
2015	Again, Spring	Mi-young	
2015	Se-hee	Yoon-hee	
2016	Grand Father	Sang Bok-nyeo	
2017	Heyday		
2017	The Weight of Hands	So-mi	
2018	Between The Seasons		
2020	Killing Diva	Soo-kyung	
2020	Ensemble	Han Joo-young	

=== Television series ===
Year	Title	Role
2013	The Cravings	Part-time student
2014	Prominent Woman	Herself
2015	Great Stories: "Kim Sisters"	Ae-ja
2015	Keep Going	Yeon-hee
2015	Investigator Alice	Nam Bit-na
2016	Legend Hero	Gongsun Zan
2016	Hello, My Twenties!	Song Kyung-ah
2017	Argon	Han Soo-young
2018	The Hymn of Death	Yoon Sin-deok's Japanese friend
2019	The Banker	Shin So-young
2020	Welcome	Lee Roo-bi
2023	The Escape of the Seven	Kindergarten teacher (episode 10)
