= Dear My Sister =

2011 South Korean television series

- Promotional Poster
- Also known as: My Sister Bok-hee
- Genre: Drama, Romance, Family
- Written by: Lee Geum-rim
- Directed by: Moon Young-jin
- Starring: Jang Mi-inae; Ryu Tae-joon; Choi Chang-yeob
- Country of origin: South Korea
- Original language: Korean
- No. of episodes: 130

Production
- Executive producer: Hwang Eui-kyung
- Running time: Mondays to Fridays at 09:00 (KST)

Original release
- Network: KBS2
- Release: November 7, 2011 – May 4, 2012

Dear My Sister (Korean: 복희 누나; lit. 'My Sister Bok-hee') is a 2011 South Korean television series starring Jang Mi-inae, Ryu Tae-joon, and Choi Chang-yeob. The morning soap opera aired on KBS2 on November 7, 2011, to May 4, 2012, from Mondays to Fridays at 09:00 for 130 episodes.

Dear My Sister is the continuation of the TV Novel series after Glory of Youth stopped airing on KBS1 in April 2009.

== Plot ==
Han Bok-hee is a girl who studies very hard and works at a brewery. When she was five years old, her parents divorced and Bok-hee went to live with her mother. Her father died in a coal mine accident.

Her mother Yoon Jung-ae got remarried to Song Byung-man, the owner of Dukchun, a brewery company. Although Bok-hee addresses her mother as "aunt" in public, people later learn that Bok-hee is Jung-ae's daughter. As a result, her stepbrother Bok-nam is sent to an orphanage, and Bok-hee leaves for Seoul.

Kang Joon-mo worked as a stuntman, but due to injury had to quit his job. He comes to Dukchun to work as a temporary teacher. Joon-mo meets Bok-hee for the first time when she peers through the window of a classroom in which he's teaching. Joon-mo sees the passion in Bok-hee's eyes and becomes her mentor.

== Cast ==
Song family

- Jang Mi-inae as Han Bok-hee
  - Jung Ji-in as young Bok-hee
- Kim Ji-young as Choi Gan-nan (Bok-hee's step-grandmother)
- Lee Hyo-jung as Song Byung-man (Bok-hee's step-father)
- Kyeon Mi-ri as Yoon Jung-ae (Bok-hee's mother)
- Chae Min-hee as Song Mi-ja (Byung-man's younger sister)
- Bae Dong-sung as Yang Mal-goo (driver and Mi-ja's husband)
- Choi Chang-yeob as Han Bok-nam (Bok-hee's half-brother)
  - In Ji-won as young Bok-nam
- Kim Yoo-ri as Song Geum-joo (Byung-man's oldest child)
  - Seo Ji-seung as young Geum-joo
- Yuk Dong-il as Song Tae-joo (Byung-man's second child)
  - Kim Ki-hyun as young Tae-joo
- Seo Hae-rim as Song Eun-joo (Byung-man's youngest child)
  - Kim Yoo-ri as young Eun-joo

Brewery people

- Choi Woo-suk as Ji Young-pyo
  - Kwak Jung-wook as young Young-pyo
- Im Seung-dae as Bae Dal-bong
- Kim Na-woon as Choi Jeom-rye (housemaid)

Hospital people

- Ryu Tae-joon as Kang Joon-mo (Bok-hee's teacher and In-sook's younger brother)
- Han Jung-gook as Kim Jin-gook (doctor)
- Kwon Kyung-ha as Kang In-sook (nurse and doctor's wife)
- Kim Si-ohn as Kim Min-soo (Joon-mo's nephew)
  - Lee Ji-oh as young Min-soo

Yeongmisa people

- Seo Seung-man as Kwon Yong-sool
- Kim Sun-eun as Ko Bong-soo
- Kim Hyun-ah as Cha Pil-soon
- Park Hee-eun as Gong Ok-ja

Extended cast

- Lee Je-in as Lee Eun-young
- Jo Sun-hyung as Hong Baek-goo
- Ryohei Otani as Baek Tae-woong
- Kwang Hoon as university student

== See also ==
- Korean Broadcasting System
