= Hwang Bo-ra =

South Korean actress (born 1983)

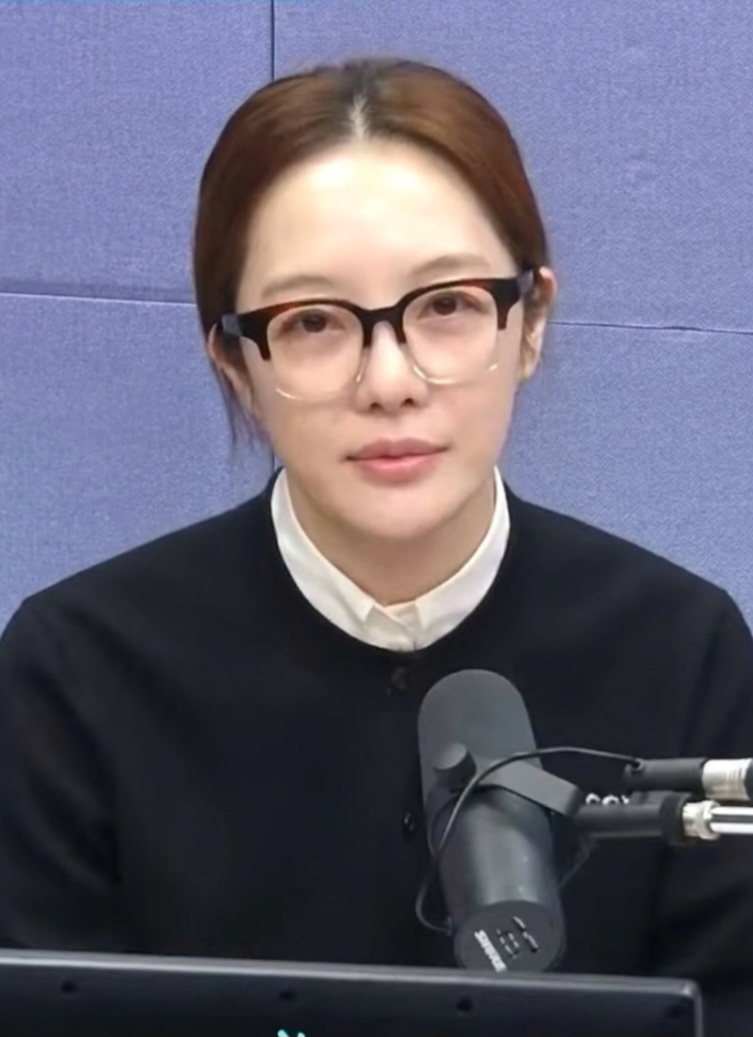
- Hwang in January 2026
- Born: October 2, 1983 (age 43); Busan, South Korea
- Education: Dongguk University – Theater and Film
- Occupation: Actress
- Years active: 2003–present
- Agent: Walk House Company
- Spouse: Cha Hyun-woo (m. 2022)
- Children: 1

Korean name
- Hangul: 황보라
- Hanja: 黃寶羅
- RR: Hwang Bora
- MR: Hwang Pora

Hwang Bo-ra (Korean: 황보라; born October 2, 1983) is a South Korean actress. Hwang made her acting debut in 2003 and became popular after she played a quirky-looking "cup noodle girl" in a ramyeon commercial. In 2007, Hwang played the daughter/narrator in black comedy Skeletons in the Closet (also known as Shim's Family), for which she won Best New Actress at the Busan Film Critics Awards and Director's Cut Awards.

This was followed by supporting roles in films and television dramas such as Arang and the Magistrate (2012), The Eldest (2013), and Cunning Single Lady (2014). Hwang has also played leading roles in ghost romance Jumunjin (2010; which reunited her with Rainbow Romance co-star Kim Kibum), revenge drama Dangerous Woman (2011), and horror movie Navigation (2014).

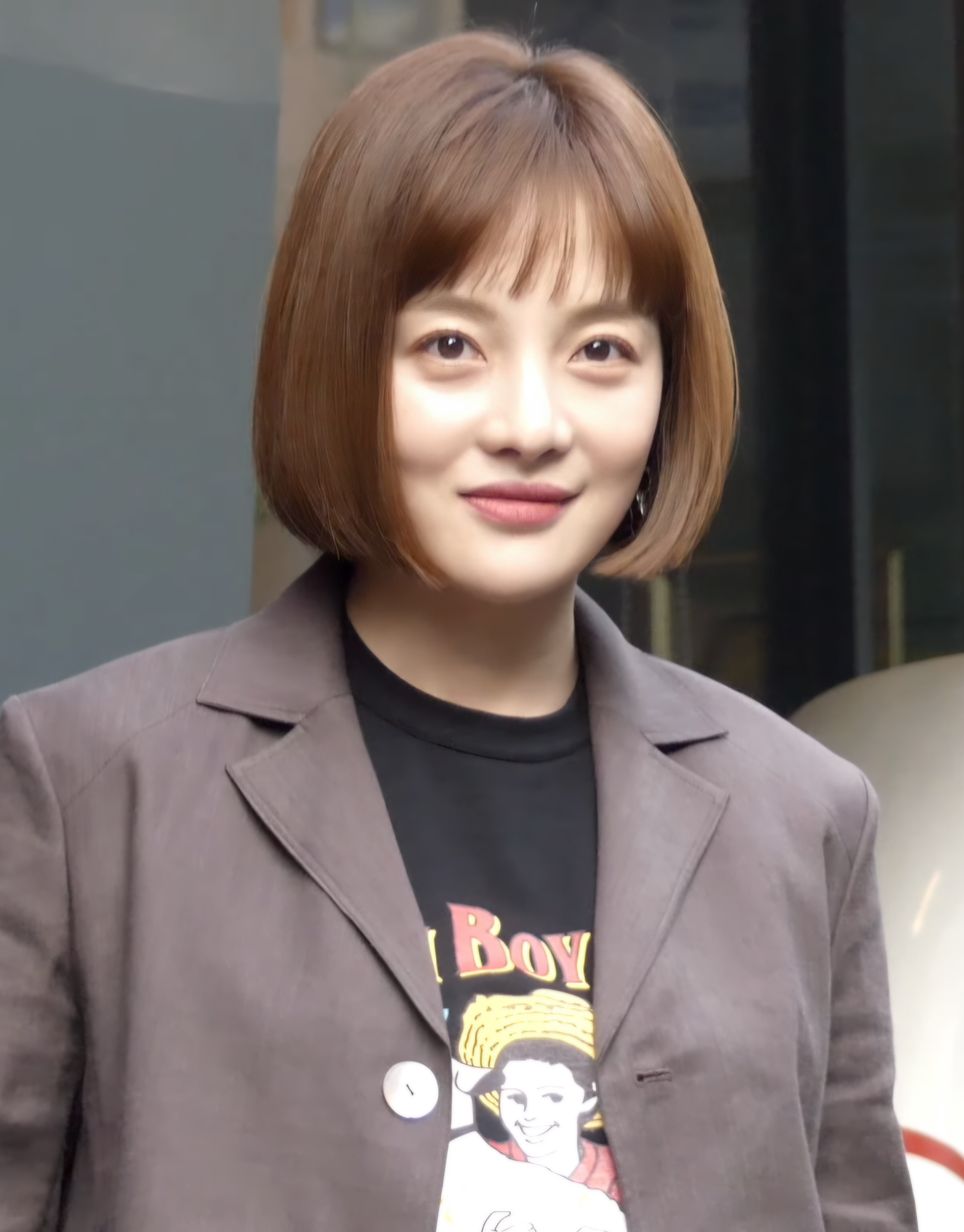
Hwang in May 2019

== Personal life ==
On July 6, 2022, Hwang revealed that she will be marrying Kim Young-hoon, CEO of her management agency Walk House Company whom she had been dating for 10 years, on November 6, 2022, in a private wedding ceremony in Seoul. Kim is also an actor and singer-turned-film producer better known as Cha Hyun-woo and is the younger brother of actor Ha Jung-woo and the second son of actor Kim Yong-gun.

Hwang appeared as a special MC in SBS Same Bed, Different Dreams 2 and stated that the couple had already registered their marriage and were a legal couple in March 2022.

In November 2023, Hwang announced on SNS that she was pregnant with her first child. She gave birth to a son on May 23, 2024.

== Philanthropy ==
On November 16, 2022, Hwang donated 10,000 batteries through Seoul Briquette Bank to help keep the elderly warm during the winter.

== Filmography ==
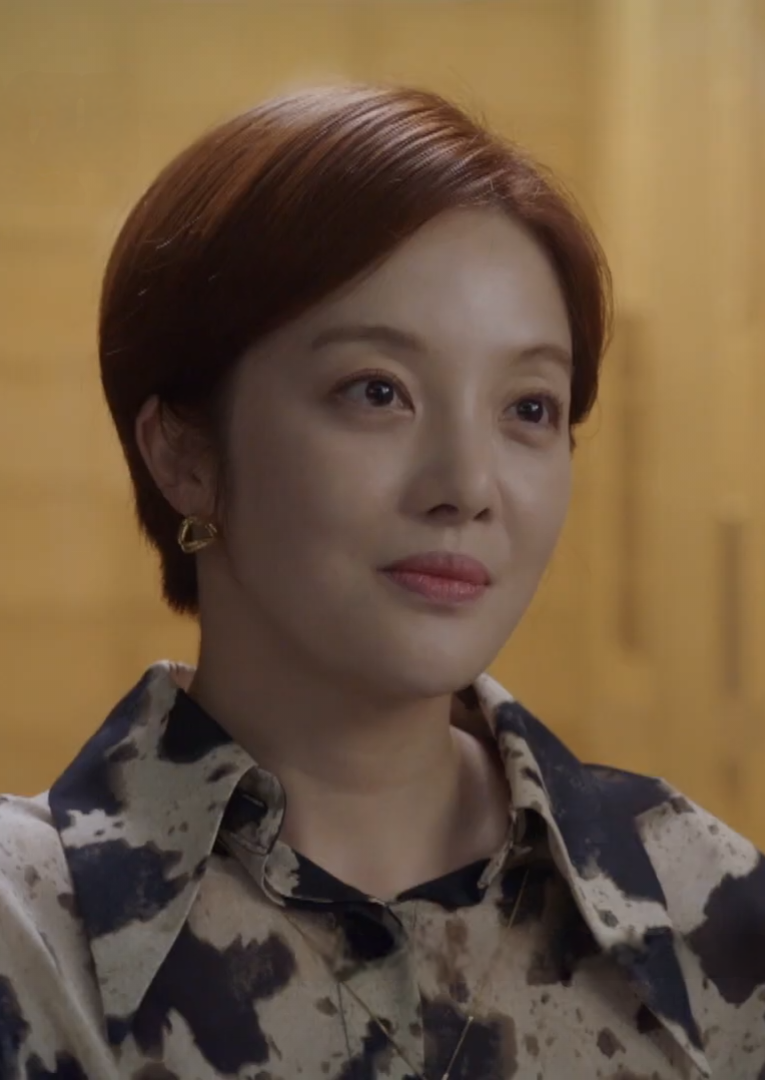
Hwang in Miracle (2022)

=== Film ===
Year	Title	Role	Notes/Ref.
1999	Memento Mori	Classmate	
2007	Skeletons in the Closet	Shim Yong-sun	
2008	Radio Dayz	Myeong-wol, a gisaeng	
2008	Dachimawa Lee	Weird girl	
2009	I Am a Stewardess		
2009	The Relation of Face, Mind and Love	Tae-young	Telecinema
2010	Jumunjin	Ji-ni	
2010	Petty Romance	Bol-mae's older sister (cameo)	
2014	Navigation	Soo-na	
2015	Chronicle of a Blood Merchant	Gye-hwa	
2015	Petit Bourgeois		
2015	The Phone	Kim Hye-jin	
2016	Phantom Detective	Used-book store woman	
2019	Trade Your Love	Song Mi-yeon	
2023	Our Season	Mi-jin	
2026	Ugly Duckling Ms. Maeng	Na Eun-mi	

=== Television series ===
Year	Title	Role	Notes/Ref.
2002	Successful Story of a Bright Girl		
2003	Sweetheart		
2003	Garden of Eve		
2003	Punch		
2003	Long Live Love		
2004	Human Market	Gong-mi	
2004	Toji, the Land	Yeon-yi	
2005	Lawyers	Shin Ji-na	
2005	The Secret Lovers	Seo Young-min	
2005	Nonstop 6	Herself	
2005	My Girl	Ahn Jin-shim	
2007	Ground Zero	Kim So-young	
2008	Love Marriage	Kim Soon-young	
2008	Amnok River Flows	young Goo Wol-yi	
2009	Father, Your Place	Mi-ok	
2010	Road No. 1	Girl from Oh Jong-ki's hometown	(Cameo)
2010	Smile, Mom	Kim Mi-so	
2011	Dangerous Woman	Kang So-ra	
2012	Love Rain	Hwang In-sook	
2012	Arang and the Magistrate	Bang-wool	
2012	Something Shocking		
2013	The Eldest	Park Soon-geum	
2014	Cunning Single Lady	Kang Min-young	
2014	Mr. Back	Yoo Nan-hee	
2016	My Horrible Boss	Jang Mi-ri	
2016	Blow Breeze	Jo Hee-ra	
2017	Fight for My Way	Park Chan-sook	Cameo
2018	The Miracle We Met	Song Sa-ran	
2018	What's Wrong with Secretary Kim	Bong Se-ra	
2018	My Strange Hero		cameo
2019	Vagabond	Gong Hwa-sook	
2019	Touch Your Heart		Cameo
2020	Mystic Pop-up Bar	Chunhyang	Cameo (episode 1)
2020	Hyena	Sim Yoo-Mi	
2020	Zombie Detective	Gong Sun-young	
2020	KBS Drama Special: "While You're Away"	Song Eun-Hye	Season 11; one act-drama
2021	Dali & Cocky Prince	Yeo Mi-ri	
2021	Moonshine	woman who captures the heart of Hwang-ga	(Cameo)
2022	Business Proposal	Hwang Bo-ra	Cameo (episode 9)
2023	Crash Course in Romance	Lee Mi-ok (Dan-ji's mother)	
2024	High School Return of a Gangster	Lee Mi-kyung	

=== Web series ===
Year	Title	Role	Ref.
2022	Kiss Sixth Sense	Jang Um-ji	

=== Television shows ===
Year	Title	Role	Ref.
2019	My Sibling's Lovers: Family Is Watching	Host	
2021	Seol Vival	Host	
2022	God of Lawyer'	Host	

=== Music video appearances ===
Year	Song title	Artist
2005	"Struggle"	F&F
2010	"My Name's Woman"	Bi Girl

== Theater ==
Year	Title	Role	Reprised
2010	Cats on the Roof	Nam Jung-eun	2011–2012

== Awards and nominations ==
Name of the award ceremony, year presented, category, nominee of the award, and the result of the nomination
Award ceremony	Year	Category	Nominee / Work	Result	Ref.
Blue Dragon Film Awards	2007	Best New Actress	Skeletons in the Closet	Nominated	
Busan Film Critics Awards	2007	Best New Actress	Skeletons in the Closet	Won	
Director's Cut Awards	2007	Best New Actress	Skeletons in the Closet	Nominated	
MBC Drama Awards	2012	Excellence Award, Actress in a Miniseries	Arang and the Magistrate	Nominated	
SBS Drama Awards	2019	Best Character Award	Vagabond	Nominated	
Korea Drama Awards	2022	Best Supporting Actress	Kiss Sixth Sense	Won	
