= Yoon Jung-hee (actress, born 1980) =

South Korean actress (born 1980)

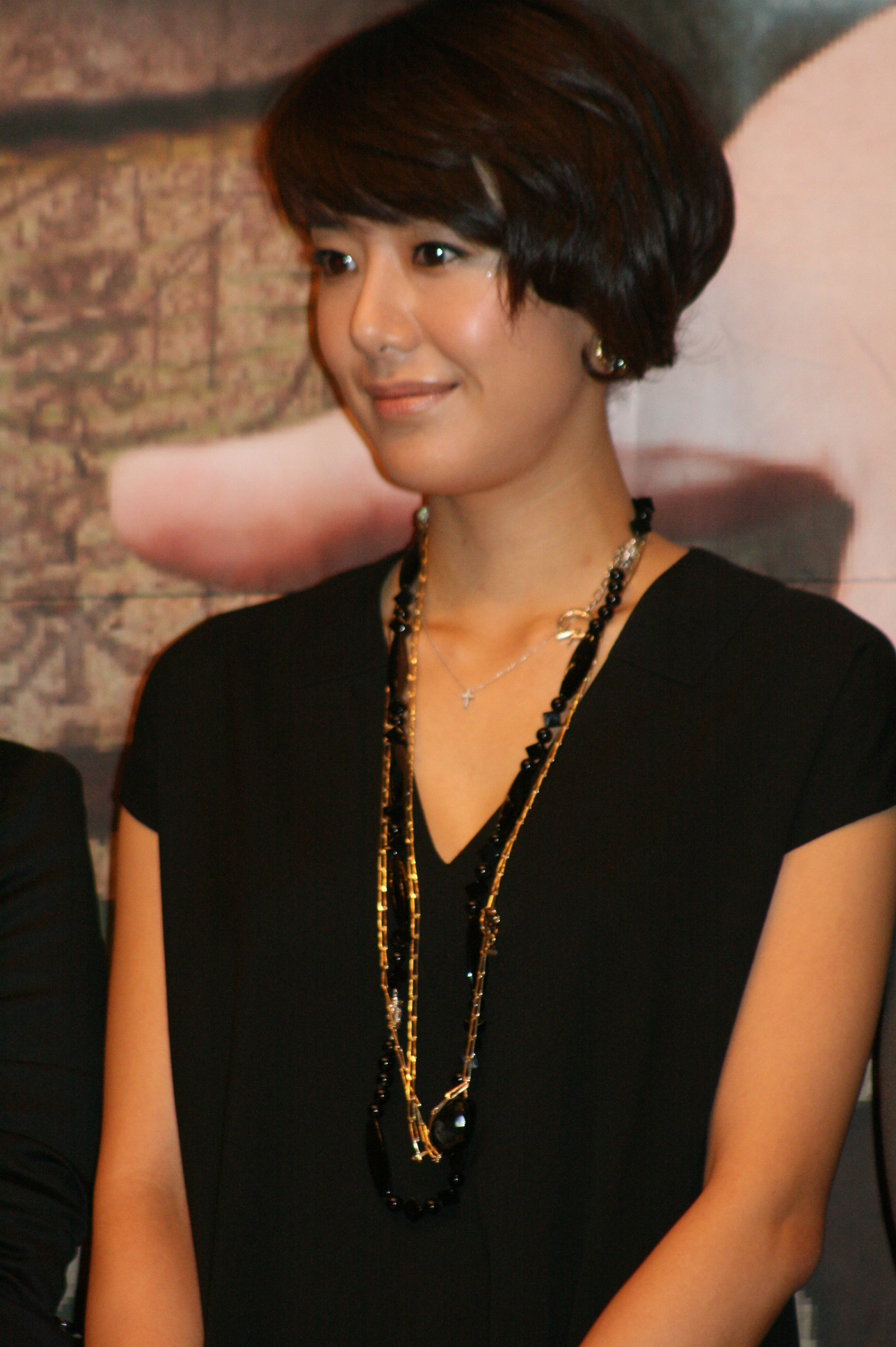
- Yoon in 2008
- Born: December 21, 1980 (age 45); Anyang, Gyeonggi, South Korea
- Other name: Yoon Jeong-hee
- Education: Suwon Women's College - Acting/Modeling
- Occupation: Actress
- Years active: 1999–present
- Agent: Sublime
- Spouse: Lee Jun-ho (m. 2015)
- Children: 2

Korean name
- Hangul: 윤정희
- RR: Yun Jeonghui
- MR: Yun Chŏnghŭi
- Website: sublimeartist.co.kr/post/yoon-jung-hee

Yoon Jung-hee (Korean: 윤정희; born December 21, 1980) is a South Korean actress. Yoon was the representative of Gyeonggi Province at the Miss Korea beauty pageant in 2000, then lived in obscurity for several years while trying to find work as an actress. She made her breakthrough in 2005 in the hit drama Dear Heaven, followed by more leading roles on television, including Blissful Woman (2007), and Family's Honor (2008). She also starred in the horror film Death Bell (2008).

== Filmography ==
=== Television drama ===
Year	Title	Role
2003	Screen	bit part
2004	Nonstop 4	bit part
2005	Choice	Kim Min-ji
2005–2006	Dear Heaven	Lee Ja-kyung
2007	Blissful Woman	Lee Ji-yeon
2008–2009	Family's Honor	Ha Dan-ah
2010–2011	Smile, Mom	Kang Shin-young
2012	Tasty Life	Jang Seung-joo
2013–2014	The Eldest	Kim Young-sun
2021–2022	Now, We Are Breaking Up	Sin Yoo-jeong
2024	Serendipity's Embrace	Bae Hye-sook

=== Film ===
Year	Title	Role
2008	Death Bell	Choi So-young
2014	My Love, My Bride	Seung-hee

=== Variety show ===
Year	Title	Network
2003	The War of the Roses	KBS
2005	싱싱 Saturday	KBS
2012	Exploration of Genders	MBC

=== Music video appearances ===
Year	Song title	Artist
2004	"눈물이 하늘 가려"	Gi Hoo
2009	"8282" (Part 1)	Davichi
2009	"I Made an Accident" (Part 2)	Davichi

== Personal life ==
Yoon married a then-unnamed office worker, who was six years older than her, in a private wedding ceremony held on May 30, 2015 at a resort in Bali, Indonesia. They have two children, a male (born May 2017) and a female (born February 2019).

On December 1, 2023, Yoon's husband, Lee Jun-ho, was revealed as the Kakao Entertainment executive being investigated since November 30 for allegations of breach of trust under the Special Police Act. At that time, Lee was the head of Kakao Entertainment's investment strategy division, and prior to that was the former president and chief executive officer of its television production subsidiary Mega Monster from 2017 to 2019. Prior to marrying Yoon, he was the husband of the only daughter of drama screenwriter Kim Soo-hyun.

The investigation stemmed at first from the controversy surrounding the former company and its parent organization's acquisition of shares in SM Entertainment in March 2023 (a media outlet reported that Yoon was found to have held 67,751 shares of SM Entertainment stock as of the end of 2022), however, it was further revealed that Yoon was a co-founder (with her husband) and investor in Baram Pictures, another production company which was acquired by Kakao Entertainment in July 2020 for ₩20 million despite continuously incurring big operational losses annually since it was founded in 2017. That transaction has been alleged by prosecutors as a cause of loss of money for the company, and they also saw possible conflict of interest in it due to Lee and Yoon being married at the time it happened.

Yoon's agency, Sublime, said that "it is difficult at this time to confirm (or deny) since this is part of private life (of the actress)".

On September 30, 2025, the Criminal Agreement Section 15 of the Seoul Southern District Court (Presiding Judge Yang Hwan-seung) found Lee guilty of embezzlement and sentenced him to two years in prison, suspended for three years. He, as well as the prosecution team, has filed an appeal to the Seoul High Court, however, on June 11, 2026, the latter court's Criminal Division 3 (Presiding Judge Lee Seung-han) denied both appeals and upheld the sentence given by the lower court.

== Philanthropy ==
On March 7, 2022, Yoon donated 50 million won to the Hope Bridge Disaster Relief Association to help the victims of the massive wildfire that started in Uljin, Gyeongbuk and has spread to Samcheok, Gangwon.

== Awards and nominations ==
Year	Award	Category	Nominated work	Result
1999	Dongsung-Nokia Best Model of the World	—N/a	—N/a	Won
2005	SBS Drama Awards	New Star Award	Dear Heaven	Won
2007	KBS Drama Awards	Excellence Award, Actress in a Serial Drama	Blissful Woman	Won
2009	45th Baeksang Arts Awards	Best New Actress – Film	Death Bell	Nominated
2009	SBS Drama Awards	PD Award	Family's Honor	Won
2009	SBS Drama Awards	Excellence Award, Actress in a Special Planning Drama	Family's Honor	Nominated
