= Jang Mi-inae =

South Korean actress (born 1984)

Jang Mi-in-ae
- Born: May 28, 1984 (age 42); South Korea
- Education: Soong Eui Women's College - Dance
- Occupation: Actress
- Years active: 2003–2013
- Spouse: Unknown (m. 2022)
- Children: 1

Korean name
- Hangul: 장미인애
- RR: Jang Miinae
- MR: Chang Miinae

Jang Mi In-Ae (Korean: 장미인애; born May 28, 1984) is a South Korean former actress. She starred in the sitcoms Nonstop and Soulmate, as well as the television dramas Dear My Sister and Missing You.

In 2013, she was investigated then indicted for illegal use of the narcotic propofol. The Seoul Central District Court found Jang guilty of taking propofol 410 times over six years (or 5.6 times a month), and she was sentenced to eight months in prison, suspended for two years.

== Personal life ==
On August 18, 2022, Jang announced that she was pregnant and about to give birth in October. Her marriage was expected to be around next year after her birth. Jang gave birth to a son on October 13, 2022, after registering her marriage with her businessman fiancé. On April 29, 2023, the couple officially married at Hotel Shilla in a private ceremony.

== Filmography ==
=== Television series ===
Year	Title	Role
2003	Nonstop 4	
2004	Nonstop 5	
2005	Rainbow Romance	
2005	Super Rookie	
2006	Soulmate	Min-ae
2007	A Happy Woman	Jo Ha-young
2008	Crime 2	Jung Ha-na
2011	Dear My Sister	Han Bok-hee
2012	Missing You	Kim Eun-joo
2019	My Lawyer, Mr. Jo 2: Crime and Punishment	Jang Soon-im

=== Film ===
Year	Title	Role
2006	Almost Love	Kim Ji-min
2010	Origin	
2012	90 Minutes	Hye-ri

=== Variety show ===
Year	Title	Notes
2006	Show! Music Core	Host

=== Music video appearances ===
Year	Song title	Artist
2004	"Angel Song"	Daylight
2004	"Secret"	Daylight
2004	"Incurable Disease"	Wheesung
2005	"Happiness"	Gavy NJ
2005	"I'll Still Live"	Gavy NJ
2005	"Love All"	H7
2005	"Summer Dream"	H7
2005	"Rebirth"	Eru
