= Vagabond (TV series) =

2019 South Korean television series

- Promotional poster
- Hangul: 배가본드
- RR: Baegabondeu
- MR: Paegabondŭ
- Genre: Spy; Crime; Action; Thriller; Romance
- Created by: Lee Yong-seok (planning)
- Written by: Jang Young-chul; Jung Kyung-soon
- Directed by: Yoo In-shik
- Starring: Lee Seung-gi; Bae Suzy; Shin Sung-rok
- Music by: Nam Hye-seung
- Country of origin: South Korea
- Original language: Korean
- No. of episodes: 16

Production
- Executive producers: Ko Eun-ho (CP); Kim Kyung-kyu(CP)
- Producers: Park Jae-sam; Kim Ji-woo
- Production locations: South Korea; Portugal; Morocco
- Cinematography: Lee Gil-bok
- Camera setup: Single camera
- Running time: 70 minutes
- Production company: Celltrion Entertainment
- Budget: ₩25 billion

Original release
- Network: SBS TV
- Release: September 20 – November 23, 2019

Vagabond (Korean: 배가본드) is a 2019 South Korean television series starring Lee Seung-gi, Bae Suzy and Shin Sung-rok. It aired on SBS TV from September 20 to November 23, 2019, for 16 episodes. Each episode was released on Netflix in South Korea and internationally after their television broadcast.

== Synopsis ==
Cha Dal-gun (Lee Seung-gi) works as an underrated stuntman, while simultaneously taking care of his orphaned nephew, Cha Hoon (Moon Woo-jin). Although they have a fairly loving relationship, Hoon argues with his uncle before he leaves to go on a field trip to Morocco via the B357 flight. Just before the plane takes off, Hoon sends a video of himself encouraging Dal-gun to continue following his dream to become a master in Taekwondo. At a drama set Dal-gun watches a report of a plane crash that killed over 200 civilians due to structural failure.

He is completely shocked when he realizes that it is the exact same plane his nephew had taken to Morocco. With his world now turned upside down, Dal-gun travels to Morocco to attend the funeral for all the victims of the plane crash in the Mediterranean and Alboran Seas, grieving for the loss of his nephew. Upon reaching Morocco, in the airport Dal-gun recognizes a supposedly dead passenger from the video his nephew had recorded. He manages to confront the man and slowly begins to realize that the plane crash was not caused just by a malfunction.

However, any evidence he finds is mysteriously erased and his life is threatened whenever he tries to prove to others that the plane crash was not an accident. As the situation grows more complex, he is forced to become partners with Go Hae-ri (Bae Suzy), a covert operative for the National Intelligence Service striving for a promotion. Determined to find out the truth behind the accident, Dal-gun and Hae-ri embark on an investigation that leads them deeper into a tangled web of corruption.

== Cast ==
=== Main ===
- Lee Seung-gi as Cha Dal-gun

Dal-gun is a stuntman whose nephew Cha Hoon was a victim of the B357 plane crash, which involved a ring of terrorists and governmental conspiracies attempting to cover it up. To expose their secrets, Dal-gun teams up with Hae-ri and the NIS to investigate and ultimately get justice.

- Bae Suzy as Go Hae-ri

Hae-ri is a NIS (National Intelligence Service) agent who chose the life of a civil servant to support her family but ends up becoming a covert operative.

- Shin Sung-rok as Gi Tae-ung

Head of the National Intelligence Agency's information team.

=== Supporting ===
==== People at the Blue House ====
- Baek Yoon-sik as Jung Kook-pyo

The President of Korea.

- Moon Sung-keun as Hong Soon-jo

Prime Minister of South Korea.

- Kim Min-jong as Yoon Han-ki/Agent Shadow

Secretary of Civil Affairs.

- Choi Kwang-il as Park Man-young

Minister of National Defense.

==== People at NIS ====
- Kim Jong-soo as An Ki-dong

Director General of the NIS.

- Lee Ki-young as Kang Joo-chul

Director of the NIS.

- Jung Man-sik as Min Jae-sik

Hae-ri's boss at the NIS.

- Hwang Bo-ra as Gong Hwa-sook

NIS staff member and Go Hae-ri's friend.

- Shin Seung-hwan as Kim Se-hun

NIS staff.

==== People of Arms lobby group ====
- Lee Geung-young as Edward Park (Korean name: Park Ki-pyo)/

Head of D.K.P (Dynamic KP), a group of the Dynamic Systems Corporation.

- Moon Jeong-hee as Jessica Lee

President-in-charge of the Asian branch of John & Mark.

- Ryu Won as Mickey

Edward Park's assistant.

- Kim Jung-hyun as Hong Seung-beom

Jessica's aide.

==== People at Vagabond ====
- Kim Sun-young as Kye Sun-ja
- Yang Hyung-wook as tech genius Kye Jang-su who has Savant syndrome.

==== Others ====
- Jang Hyuk-jin as Kim Woo-gi, co-pilot of B357 plane who was bribed to crash the plane with Jerome.
- Kang Kyung-hun as Oh Sang-mi, Kim Woo-gi's wife
- Lee Si-yoo as Seo Young-ji
- Teo Yoo as Jerome, a former mercenary involved in the crash of the B357 plane, alongside Kim Woo-gi.
- Park Ah-in as Lily, an assassin hired by Jessica to kill Cha Dal-gun and Kim Woo-gi.
- Choi Dae-chul as Kim Do-soo, a North Korean defector working under Min Jae-sik's orders and later works for Lily.
- Kim Dae-gon as Ui Jeong's father
- Ko Kyu-pil as Park Kwang-deok, husband of one of the victims of the B357 plane crash who owns a judo gym.
- Yoo Hyung-kwan
- Matthew Douma

=== Special appearances ===
- Moon Woo-jin as Cha Hoon, Cha Dal-gun's nephew (Ep. 1, 7, 9) and one of the victims of the B357 plane crash.
  - Jung Hyun-joon as a young Cha Hoon (ep. 1–2)
- António Pedro Cerdeira as Michael Almeida, the VP of John & Mark Asia, implicated in the crash of the B357 plane. He was killed in Portugal at the beginning of the series when he attempted to abort the crash.
- Seo Sang-won as Choi Jeong-woon - Airplane captain
- Yoon Na-moo as Kim Ho-sik (Embassy staff)
- Lee Hwang-ui as Dr. Kevin Kim
- Yoon Da-hoon as Judge Ahn Seung-tae

== Production ==
=== Development ===
- Lee Seung-gi and Bae Suzy previously starred together in Gu Family Book (2013).
- The series is the fourth collaboration between screenwriters Jang Young-chul and Jung Kyung-soon and director Yoo In-shik after Giant (2010), History of a Salaryman (2012), and Incarnation of Money (2013).
- The first script reading was held on June 2, 2018.

=== Filming ===
Filming began in June 2018 and the series is entirely pre-produced. Overseas filming took place in Tangier and Medina in Morocco. In addition, some scenes were filmed in the desert and in Portugal.

=== Release ===
Originally scheduled to air in end-2018, the series was pushed back to May 2019, and then again due to filming schedule issues and a pending deal with Netflix. It aired in September 2019.

== Original soundtrack ==
=== Part 1 ===
Released on September 20, 2019
| No. | Title | Lyrics | Music | Artist | Length |
|---|---|---|---|---|---|
| 1. | "Good All Days" | Nam Hye-seung; Jello Ann | Nam Hye-seung; Surf Green | Lee Chan-sol | 3:24 |
| 2. | "Good All Days" (Inst.) | | Nam Hye-seung; Surf Green | | 3:24 |
| Total length: | | | | | 6:48 |

=== Part 2 ===
Released on September 27, 2019
| No. | Title | Lyrics | Music | Artist | Length |
|---|---|---|---|---|---|
| 1. | "Fallen Star" | Nam Hye-seung; Jello Ann | Nam Hye-seung; Surf Green | Elaine | 4:44 |
| 2. | "Fallen Star" (Inst.) | | Nam Hye-seung; Surf Green | | 4:44 |
| Total length: | | | | | 9:28 |

=== Part 3 ===
Released on October 4, 2019
| No. | Title | Lyrics | Music | Artist | Length |
|---|---|---|---|---|---|
| 1. | "Breaking Dawn" | Nam Hye-seung; Jello Ann | Nam Hye-seung; B.a.B | I'll | 3:25 |
| 2. | "Breaking Dawn" (Inst.) | | Nam Hye-seung; B.a.B | | 3:25 |
| Total length: | | | | | 6:50 |

=== Part 4 ===
Released on October 11, 2019
| No. | Title | Lyrics | Music | Artist | Length |
|---|---|---|---|---|---|
| 1. | "Hello My Lover" | Nam Hye-seung; Maktub; Lee Raon | Maktub; Lee Raon | Baek A-yeon | 3:14 |
| 2. | "Hello My Lover" (Inst.) | | Maktub; Lee Raon | | 3:14 |
| Total length: | | | | | 6:28 |

=== Part 5 ===
Released on October 18, 2019
| No. | Title | Lyrics | Music | Artist | Length |
|---|---|---|---|---|---|
| 1. | "Here For You" | Nam Hye-seung; Jello Ann | Nam Hye-seung; Park Sang-hee | Lee Ju-hyuk | 3:27 |
| 2. | "Here For You" (Inst.) | | Nam Hye-seung; Park Sang-hee | | 3:27 |
| Total length: | | | | | 6:54 |

=== Part 6 ===
Released on October 25, 2019
| No. | Title | Lyrics | Music | Artist | Length |
|---|---|---|---|---|---|
| 1. | "Open Fire" | Nam Hye-seung; Jello Ann | Nam Hye-seung; Park Jin-ho | The VANE | 3:59 |
| 2. | "Open Fire" (Inst.) | | Nam Hye-seung; Park Jin-ho | | 3:07 |
| Total length: | | | | | 7:06 |

=== Part 7 ===
Released on November 2, 2019
| No. | Title | Lyrics | Music | Artist | Length |
|---|---|---|---|---|---|
| 1. | "Falling in love" | Choi Min-ji (Chansline) | Choi Min-ji (Chansline); Kim Seong-min (Chansline); Kim Si-won (Chansline) | IRO | 3:47 |
| 2. | "Falling in love" (Inst.) | | Choi Min-ji (Chansline); Kim Seong-min (Chansline); Kim Si-won (Chansline) | | 3:47 |
| Total length: | | | | | 7:34 |

=== Part 8 ===
Released on November 9, 2019
| No. | Title | Lyrics | Music | Artist | Length |
|---|---|---|---|---|---|
| 1. | "Vagabond" | Maktub; Iraon | Maktub; Iraon | Ha Hyun-woo (Guckkasten) | 3:48 |
| 2. | "Vagabond" (Movie Still ver.) | Maktub; Iraon | Maktub; Iraon | Ha Hyun-woo (Guckkasten) | 3:48 |
| 3. | "Vagabond" (Inst.) | Maktub; Iraon | Maktub; Iraon | | 3:48 |
| Total length: | | | | | 11:24 |

=== Part 9 ===
Released on November 23, 2019
| No. | Title | Lyrics | Music | Artist | Length |
|---|---|---|---|---|---|
| 1. | "If I was" | Taibian | Taibian; Bark | Kim Jae-hwan | 5:13 |
| 2. | "If I was" (Inst.) | | Taibian; Bark | Kim Jae-hwan | 5:13 |
| Total length: | | | | | 10:26 |

Disc 2:
| No. | Title | Artist | Length |
|---|---|---|---|
| 1. | "Vagabond" (Opening title) | Nam Hye-seung | 1:04 |
| 2. | "The God of War" | Nam Hye-seung | 3:54 |
| 3. | "The Desert" | Nam Hye-seung | 2:59 |
| 4. | "He is a Stuntman" | Nam Hye-seung | 2:48 |
| 5. | "The Last Countdown" | Nam Hye-seung | 4:01 |
| 6. | "Portugal Chase" | Nam Hye-seung | 2:05 |
| 7. | "Lost Video" | Nam Hye-seung | 2:52 |
| 8. | "N.I.S" | Nam Hye-seung | 2:04 |
| 9. | "Fall into a trap" | Nam Hye-seung | 1:03 |
| 10. | "Fatal Intuition" | Nam Hye-seung | 2:04 |
| 11. | "Over" | Nam Hye-seung | 2:55 |
| 12. | "Interrogate" | Nam Hye-seung | 2:17 |
| 13. | "Unforgiven" | Nam Hye-seung | 3:37 |
| 14. | "You are Mine" | Nam Hye-seung | 2:16 |
| 15. | "Cheek" | Nam Hye-seung | 1:58 |
| 16. | "Just the Beginning" | Nam Hye-seung | 2:46 |
| 17. | "Morocco Run" | Nam Hye-seung | 2:56 |
| 18. | "The Death Song" | Nam Hye-seung | 1:51 |
| 19. | "Phone Booth" | Nam Hye-seung | 3:28 |
| 20. | "Plane Crash" | Nam Hye-seung | 3:05 |
| 21. | "Black Suit" | Nam Hye-seung | 1:08 |
| 22. | "Attacked" | Nam Hye-seung | 5:28 |
| 23. | "Time Match" | Nam Hye-seung | 2:21 |
| 24. | "Pandora" | Nam Hye-seung | 3:33 |
| 25. | "Revolution" | Nam Hye-seung | 3:00 |
| 26. | "I Will Break You Down" | Nam Hye-seung | 3:01 |
| 27. | "What is Chicken House?" | Nam Hye-seung | 3:34 |
| 28. | "Storm will be coming" | Nam Hye-seung | 3:46 |
| 29. | "I See Them" | Nam Hye-seung | 1:34 |
| Total length: | | | 01:09:24 |

== Viewership ==
Vagabond : South Korea viewers per episode (millions)

| Season | Episode number | | | | | | | | | | | | | | | | Average |
| Season | 1 | 2 | 3 | 4 | 5 | 6 | 7 | 8 | 9 | 10 | 11 | 12 | 13 | 14 | 15 | 16 | Average |
|---|---|---|---|---|---|---|---|---|---|---|---|---|---|---|---|---|---|
| 1 | 1.777 | 2.007 | 1.695 | 1.933 | 2.048 | 2.343 | 2.041 | 1.950 | 1.879 | 2.032 | 1.896 | 2.253 | 2.373 | 2.086 | 2.074 | 2.472 | 2.054 |

Source: Audience measurement performed nationwide by Nielsen Media Research.

Average TV viewership ratings
| Ep. | Part | Original broadcast date | Average audience share | | |
| Ep. | Part | Original broadcast date | Nielsen Korea | | TNmS |
| Ep. | Part | Original broadcast date | Nationwide | Seoul | Nationwide |
|---|---|---|---|---|---|
| 1 | 1 | September 20, 2019 | 6.3% (16th) | 6.7% (13th) | 6.6% (17th) |
| 1 | 2 | September 20, 2019 | 8.0% (8th) | 8.8% (6th) | 7.9% (14th) |
| 1 | 3 | September 20, 2019 | 10.2% (4th) | 11.5% (4th) | 9.5% (7th) |
| 2 | 1 | September 21, 2019 | 5.8% (NR) | 6.4% (19th) | N/A |
| 2 | 2 | September 21, 2019 | 8.1% (11th) | 8.4% (6th) | 7.1% (20th) |
| 2 | 3 | September 21, 2019 | 10.3% (4th) | 10.7% (3rd) | 9.3% (9th) |
| 3 | 1 | September 27, 2019 | 7.3% (10th) | 7.5% (9th) | 6.3% (18th) |
| 3 | 2 | September 27, 2019 | 8.4% (7th) | 8.2% (7th) | 8.2% (11th) |
| 3 | 3 | September 27, 2019 | 9.3% (5th) | 9.1% (5th) | 9.1% (7th) |
| 4 | 1 | September 28, 2019 | 6.8% (15th) | 7.6% (12th) | 7.1% (18th) |
| 4 | 2 | September 28, 2019 | 8.1% (9th) | 8.8% (5th) | 8.4% (12th) |
| 4 | 3 | September 28, 2019 | 10.2% (3rd) | 11.1% (3rd) | 9.7% (3rd) |
| 5 | 1 | October 4, 2019 | 7.4% (10th) | 7.9% (10th) | 7.2% (14th) |
| 5 | 2 | October 4, 2019 | 8.9% (9th) | 9.1% (8th) | 8.2% (11th) |
| 5 | 3 | October 4, 2019 | 11.5% (4th) | 11.2% (6th) | 11.0% (4th) |
| 6 | 1 | October 5, 2019 | 7.2% (14th) | 7.7% (11th) | 7.2% (18th) |
| 6 | 2 | October 5, 2019 | 10.0% (4th) | 10.8% (4th) | 8.9% (11th) |
| 6 | 3 | October 5, 2019 | 11.3% (3rd) | 12.3% (3rd) | 10.0% (5th) |
| 7 | 1 | October 11, 2019 | 7.5% (12th) | 8.1% (12th) | 7.1% (18th) |
| 7 | 2 | October 11, 2019 | 9.5% (7th) | 10.1% (6th) | 8.2% (11th) |
| 7 | 3 | October 11, 2019 | 11.4% (4th) | 12.2% (3rd) | 9.9% (6th) |
| 8 | 1 | October 12, 2019 | 7.2% (11th) | 7.4% (11th) | 7.1% (15th) |
| 8 | 2 | October 12, 2019 | 8.8% (8th) | 9.0% (7th) | 8.8% (6th) |
| 8 | 3 | October 12, 2019 | 10.1% (4th) | 10.2% (3rd) | 9.1% (5th) |
| 9 | 1 | October 18, 2019 | 7.0% (13th) | 7.3% (11th) | 7.5% (17th) |
| 9 | 2 | October 18, 2019 | 8.6% (9th) | 9.0% (8th) | 8.7% (10th) |
| 9 | 3 | October 18, 2019 | 10.6% (4th) | 10.8% (3rd) | 10.0% (6th) |
| 10 | 1 | October 19, 2019 | 7.9% (8th) | 8.0% (7th) | 8.4% (10th) |
| 10 | 2 | October 19, 2019 | 10.2% (3rd) | 10.6% (3rd) | 9.7% (4th) |
| 11 | 1 | October 25, 2019 | 7.9% (10th) | 8.2% (9th) | 7.6% (15th) |
| 11 | 2 | October 25, 2019 | 8.9% (7th) | 8.9% (7th) | 8.6% (10th) |
| 11 | 3 | October 25, 2019 | 10.2% (4th) | 10.0% (4th) | 9.7% (7th) |
| 12 | 1 | October 26, 2019 | 9.0% (6th) | 9.5% (5th) | N/A |
| 12 | 2 | October 26, 2019 | 11.6% (3rd) | 11.9% (3rd) | N/A |
| 13 | 1 | November 2, 2019 (Note: Broadcast is delayed due to the SBS 2019 WBSC Premier 12 baseball game broadcast.) | 10.4% (4th) | 10.3% (4th) | 8.8% (8th) |
| 13 | 2 | November 2, 2019 | 12.8% (3rd) | 12.6% (3rd) | 11.0% (3rd) |
| 14 | 1 | November 9, 2019 (Note: Broadcast is delayed due to the SBS 2019 WBSC Premier 12 baseball game broadcast.) | 8.5% (5th) | 8.9% (5th) | 8.8% (8th) |
| 14 | 2 | November 9, 2019 | 10.2% (4th) | 10.6% (4th) | 9.3% (6th) |
| 14 | 3 | November 9, 2019 | 11.2% (3rd) | 11.3% (3rd) | 10.4% (3rd) |
| 15 | 1 | November 22, 2019 (Note: Broadcast is delayed due to the SBS 2019 WBSC Premier 12 baseball game broadcast.) | 8.7% (10th) | 9.0% (8th) | 7.3% (16th) |
| 15 | 2 | November 22, 2019 | 10.1% (5th) | 10.4% (3rd) | 8.2% (11th) |
| 15 | 3 | November 22, 2019 | 11.8% (2nd) | 12.1% (2nd) | 9.6% (6th) |
| 16 | 1 | November 23, 2019 | 9.3% (5th) | 9.4% (5th) | 8.6% (10th) |
| 16 | 2 | November 23, 2019 | 11.7% (4th) | 11.9% (4th) | 10.3% (4th) |
| 16 | 3 | November 23, 2019 | 13.0% (3rd) | 14.1% (3rd) | 12.1% (3rd) |
| Average | | | 9.4% | 9.7% | — (Note: Due to some ratings not recorded, the exact average rating is unknown.) |
In the table above, the blue numbers represent the lowest ratings and the red numbers represent the highest ratings.; Each night's broadcast is divided into three 20-minute parts with two commercial breaks in between.; NR denotes that the drama did not rank in the top 20 daily programs on that date.; N/A denotes that the rating is not known.

== Awards and nominations ==
| Year | Award | Category | Recipient | Result | Ref. |
|---|---|---|---|---|---|
| 2019 | SBS Drama Awards | Grand Prize (Daesang) | Lee Seung-gi | Nominated | |
| 2019 | SBS Drama Awards | Grand Prize (Daesang) | Bae Suzy | Nominated | |
| 2019 | SBS Drama Awards | Producer Award | Lee Seung-gi | Nominated | |
| 2019 | SBS Drama Awards | Producer Award | Bae Suzy | Nominated | |
| 2019 | SBS Drama Awards | Top Excellence Award in Miniseries (Male) | Lee Seung-gi | Won | |
| 2019 | SBS Drama Awards | Top Excellence Award in Miniseries (Female) | Bae Suzy | Won | |
| 2019 | SBS Drama Awards | Best Couple Award | Lee Seung-gi and Bae Suzy | Won | |
| 2019 | SBS Drama Awards | Hallyu Contents Award | Vagabond | Won | |
| 2019 | SBS Drama Awards | Excellence Award in Miniseries (Male) | Shin Sung-rok | Nominated | |
| 2019 | SBS Drama Awards | Best Character Award (Female) | Hwang Bo-ra | Nominated | |
| 2019 | SBS Drama Awards | Best Supporting Team | Park Ah-in, Choi Dae-chul, Kim Jung-hyun and Moon Jeong-hee | Nominated | |
| 2019 | SBS Drama Awards | Best Supporting Actor | Baek Yoon-sik | Nominated | |
| 2019 | SBS Drama Awards | Best Supporting Actor | Lee Geung-young | Nominated | |
| 2019 | SBS Drama Awards | Best Supporting Actress | Moon Jeong-hee | Won | |
| 2019 | SBS Drama Awards | Child Actor Award | Moon Woo-jin | Nominated | |
| 2019 | SBS Drama Awards | Best New Actress | Park Ah-in | Nominated | |
| 2021 | 7th APAN Star Awards | Popular Star Award, Actor | Lee Seung-gi | Nominated | |
