= Kim Jung-hyun (actor, born 1976) =

South Korean actor

- Born: June 28, 1976 (age 50); South Korea
- Occupation: Actor
- Years active: 1993–present

Korean name
- Hangul: 김정현
- Hanja: 金正鉉
- RR: Gim Jeonghyeon
- MR: Kim Chŏnghyŏn

Kim Jung-hyun (Korean: 김정현; born June 28, 1976) is a South Korean actor. He starred in TV series such as Gwanggaeto, The Great Conqueror (2011), Dangerous Women (2011), My Lover, Madame Butterfly (2012), Empress Ki (2013), My Mother Is a Daughter-in-law (2015) and Vagabond (2019). He also starred in Dogme 95-produced film Interview (2000).

== Filmography ==
=== Television ===
- Big Mouth (MBC, 2022)
- Drama Stage: "Everyone Is There" (tvN, 2020)
- Vagabond (SBS, 2019)
- Shady Mom-in-Law (SBS, 2019)
- My Mother Is a Daughter-in-law (SBS, 2015)
- Empress Ki (MBC, 2013)
- My Lover, Madame Butterfly (SBS, 2012)
- Dangerous Women (MBC, 2011)
- Gwanggaeto, The Great Conqueror (KBS1, 2011)
- I Believed in Men (MBC, 2011)
- Giant (SBS, 2010)
- Queen Seondeok (MBC, 2009)
- Mom's Dead Upset (KBS2, 2008)
- KBS HDTV Feature: "Deungsinbul" (KBS1, 2006)
- Cloud Stairs (KBS2, 2006)
- Dae Jo-yeong (KBS, 2006)
- I Go With You (SBS, 2006)
- Pingguari (SBS, 2005)
- Little Women (SBS, 2004)
- Breathless (MBC, 2003)
- Wedding Gift (KBS2, 2003)
- Scent of a Man (MBC, 2003)
- Who's My Love (KBS2, 2002)
- Morning Without Parting (SBS, 2001)
- Nonstop (MBC, 2000)
- She's the One (KBS2, 2000)
- Love Story - Rose (SBS, 2000)
- Kaist (SBS, 1999)
- Six Children (MBC, 1998)
- Spin (KBS2, 1997)
- The Brothers' River (SBS, 1996)
- August's Bride (SBS, 1996)
- LA Arirang (SBS, 1995)
- Agatha Christie (SBS, 1995)
- Sandglass (SBS, 1995)

=== Film ===
- Plastic Tree (2003)
- Gameover (2001)
- Rundim (2001)
- Plum Blossom (2000)
- Ahmijimong (2000)
- Interview (1999)
- He Asked Me If I Knew Zither (1997)

== Awards and nominations ==
Year	Award	Category	Nominated work	Result
2019	SBS Drama Awards	Best Supporting Team (with Park Ah-in, Moon Jeong-hee and Choi Dae-chul)	Vagabond	Nominated
