= Dangerous Woman (South Korean TV series) =

Romance drama television series

- Promotional poster
- Also known as: Dangerous Women; Fatal Lover
- Genre: Melodrama; Revenge; Romance
- Written by: Lee Hong-ku
- Directed by: Lee Min-soo
- Starring: Ko Eun-mi; Kim Jung-hyun; Hwang Bo-ra; Yeo Hyun-soo
- Ending theme: "Rain or Snow" by Kan Jong-wook
- Country of origin: South Korea
- Original language: Korean
- No. of episodes: 124

Production
- Running time: 30-38 minutes
- Production company: MBC C&I

Original release
- Network: MBC TV
- Release: October 10, 2011 – March 30, 2012

Dangerous Woman (Korean: 위험한 여자; Hanja: 危險한 女子; RR: Wiheomhan yeoja) is a 2011 South Korean television series starring Ko Eun-mi, Hwang Bo-ra, Kim Jung-hyun and Yeo Hyun-soo. It aired on MBC on Mondays to Fridays at 7:50 a.m. from October 10, 2011, to March 30, 2012, for 124 episodes.

== Plot ==
The series focuses on two sides of people with different personalities, people who are hell-bent recover from what they think is rightfully theirs, but the other side they fight to protect what belongs to them. Due to their two different personalities, they are constantly in war with each other and do despicable things that will never make things right. But the two halves try to work together to patch things up to make life for them normal again.

== Cast ==
=== Main ===
- Ko Eun-mi as Kang Yoo-ra
- Hwang Bo-ra as Kang So-ra
- Kim Jung-hyun as Kim Ji-won, Yoo-ra's boyfriend
- Yeo Hyun-soo as Kang Dong-min, Yoo-ra's younger brother, So-ra's elder brother

=== Recurring ===
- Im Chae-moo as Kang Joo-huk, Yoo-ra and Dong-min's father, the president of Group Jin-Song
- Kim Bo-yeon as Yoon Do-hee, So-ra and Dong-min's biological mother
- Sunwoo Eun-sook as Na Yeon-sook, Joo-hyuk's wife, Yoo-ra and Dong-min's mother
- Kim Eun-young as Mrs. Shin Bok-ja, Yeon-sook's mother, the founder of Group Jin-Song
- Nam Yoon-jung as Nam Ji-sook a.k.a. Aunt Paju, the Kangs' housekeeper
- Kim Young-bae as Choi Baek-hoon, a director of Group Jin-Song, So-ra's biological father
- Byun Eun-young as Mrs. Bang, Do-hee's friend
- Sung Woong as Lee Seo-hoon, Aunt Paju's son, So-ra's ex-boyfriend
- Lee Na-eun as Lee Seo-joo, Seo-hoon's younger sister, Dong-min's girlfriend
- Seo Woo-jin as PD Jo Sang-bum

=== Cameo ===
- Cho Yeon-woo as Kang Dong-joon, the son of Joo-hyuk and Yeon-sook, Yoo-ra's elder brother, who is accidentally killed by Seo-hoon
