= Ko Eun-mi =

South Korean actress (born 1976)

- Born: Ahn Eun-mi; July 7, 1976 (age 50); South Korea
- Other name: Go Eun-mi
- Education: Seoil University - Theater and Film
- Occupation: Actress
- Years active: 1995–present

Korean name
- Hangul: 안은미
- Hanja: 安恩美
- RR: An Eunmi
- MR: An Ŭnmi

Stage name
- Hangul: 고은미
- Hanja: 高恩美
- RR: Go Eunmi
- MR: Ko Ŭnmi

Ko Eun-mi (Korean: 안은미; born July 7, 1976), born Ahn Eun-mi, is a South Korean actress. She made her entertainment debut in 1995 as a singer in the co-ed group T.Ra.V (stands for "TV+Radio+Video"), which released one album Hey! Hunter before disbanding. Ko was then cast in the 1996 sitcom Three Guys and Three Girls, and has been acting full-time since 2001. She is best known for her roles in the television dramas Even So Love, Loving You a Thousand Times, Dangerous Woman and Lady Storm.

== Filmography ==
=== Television series ===
Year	Title	Role	Network
1996	Three Guys and Three Girls	Eun-mi	MBC
2001	Why Women?	Kim Eun-mi	KBS2
2002	Girl's High School Days		KBS2
2003	Age of Warriors	concubine Soon-joo	KBS1
2005	HDTV Literature: "The Buckwheat Season"	Hae-yeon	KBS1
2006	As the River Flows	Song Young-chae	KBS1
2006	Hearts of Nineteen	Ha Soo-jung	KBS1
2007	Even So Love	Seo Myung-ji	MBC
2009	Loving You a Thousand Times	Lee Sun-young	SBS
2010	Cheers for the Women	Host	OTV
2010	I Am Legend	Oh Ran-hee	SBS
2010	Smile, Mom	Hwang Bo-mi	SBS
2011	KBS Drama Special: "The 7th Day"	Yeon-hee	KBS2
2011	Dangerous Woman	Kang Yoo-ra	MBC
2013	Empire of Gold	Park Eun-jung	SBS
2014	Wife Scandal - The Wind Rises: "Love Battery"	Ko Eun-mi	TV Chosun
2014	Lady Storm	Do Hye-bin	MBC
2015	Exactly What's Going On?	Ahn-na	Daum TVpot
2017	Return of Fortunate Bok	Hong Ran-young	MBC
2018	Lady Cha Dal-rae's Lover	Nam Mi-rae	KBS2
2018	When Time Stopped	Eun-young (cameo)	KBS N
2023	Meant to Be	Jeon Mi-kang	MBC

=== Film ===
Year	Title	Role
2001	Guns & Talks	Oh Young-ran
2009	The Righteous Thief	Choi Soo-young
2010	The Quiz Show Scandal	Im Yeon-yi (cameo)
2014	We Are Brothers	young Seung-ja (cameo)
2015	Makgeolli Girls	Kim Ha-jeong
2015	My Sister, the Pig Lady	Woman 1 (cameo)

== Discography ==
=== Singles ===
Year	Title	Artist	Notes
1995	Hey! Hunter	T.Ra.V (Korean: 티라비)	album
2010	"Love, Love is Always So, Like Rain Water"	Ko Eun-mi	track from I Am Legend OST
2012	"Nice to Meet You"	Ko Eun-mi and Son Hoyoung	track from The Duet 2nd Week - Live EP

== Awards and nominations ==
Year	Award	Category	Nominated work	Result
2007	MBC Drama Awards	Best New Actress	Even So Love	Nominated
2011	MBC Drama Awards	Excellence Award, Actress in a Serial Drama	Dangerous Woman	Nominated
