= Forbidden Floor =

- Theatrical poster
- Directed by: Kwon Il-soo
- Written by: Kwon Il-soo
- Produced by: Ahn Byeong-ki
- Starring: Kim Seo-hyung; Kim You-jung; Jo Yeong-jin; Kim Yeong-seon; Kim Ja-yeong
- Cinematography: Kim Hoon-kwang
- Edited by: Park Se-hui
- Music by: Oh Bong-jun
- Distributed by: CJ Entertainment
- Release date: 27 July 2006
- Running time: 90 minutes
- Country: South Korea
- Language: Korean
- Budget: $1 million

Forbidden Floor (Korean: 네번째 층; RR: Nebeonjjae cheung) is a 2006 South Korean horror film and the second installment of the 4 Horror Tales film series. In this film, a mother and daughter move into a haunted apartment.

== Cast ==
- Kim Seo-hyung
- Kim You-jung
- Jo Yeong-jin
- Kim Young-sun
- Kim Ja-yeong
- Park Ah-in
