= A Happy Woman =

South Korean television series

- Also known as: Blissful Woman; Happy Women
- Genre: Romance, Drama
- Written by: Park Jung-ran
- Directed by: Kim Jong-chang
- Starring: Yoon Jung-hee; Kim Suk-hoon; Jung Gyu-woon
- Country of origin: South Korea
- Original language: Korean
- No. of episodes: 58

Production
- Running time: Saturdays and Sundays at 19:55

Original release
- Network: Korean Broadcasting System
- Release: January 6 – July 21, 2007

A Happy Woman (Korean: 행복한 여자; RR: Haengbokhan yeoja; also known as Blissful Woman) is a 2007 South Korean television series starring Yoon Jung-hee, Kim Suk-hoon and Jung Gyu-woon. It aired on KBS2 from January 6 to July 21, 2007, on Saturdays and Sundays at 19:55 for 58 episodes.

== Plot ==
As the titular "happy woman," Lee Ji-yeon (Yoon Jung-hee) is an accessory designer with a cheerful, go-getting personality despite often being looked down upon because of her humble educational and family background. She ends up in a love triangle with her wealthy husband (Jung Gyu-woon) and a lonely detective (Kim Suk-hoon), as the drama explores what happiness means for a woman in terms of family, work, and love.

== Cast ==
- Yoon Jung-hee as Lee Ji-yeon

Ji-yeon is an accessory designer. She graduated from a vocational college and is therefore looked down on by her peers at work. At her home, she is the youngest daughter of three and was raised by a divorced single mother. She is not her mother's biological child - she is her divorced father's love child. She married into a wealthy family and her mother-in-law does not approve of her. Despite these hardships in both her personal and work life, Ji-yeon is bright, kind, and optimistic.

- Jung Gyu-woon as Choi Joon-ho

Ji-yeon's husband. The second son of a wealthy family, he has a modern attitude and a sophisticated manner. He married Ji-yeon without regard to her wealth and background.

- Kim Suk-hoon as Kim Tae-seop

A detective. He became estranged from his widowed mother during his teenage years when she remarried. He worked hard to graduate high school on his own and attended police academy. He then re-established his relationship with his mother, and even accepted his stepfather, but still remains somewhat distant.

Lee family

- Go Doo-shim as Park Won-hee (mother)
- Kang Boo-ja as Son Young-soon (grandmother)
- Moon Jeong-hee as Lee Ji-sook (older sister)
- Kim Yoon-jung as Lee Ji-seon (youngest sister)
- Kim Jae-man as Hwang Dae-gil (Ji-seon's husband)
- Kim So-hyun as young Ji-yeon

Choi family

- Joo Hyun as Choi Hyun-doo (father)
- Sa Mi-ja as Byun Young-ja (mother)
- Park Sung-woong as Choi Joon-sik (older brother)
- Choi Ji-na as Moon Sun-young (Joon-sik's wife)

Kim family

- Jang Yong as Lee Jong-min (stepfather)
- Park Soon-chun as Tae-seop's mother
- Kim Dae-sung as Lee Ji-hoon (stepbrother)

Extended cast

- Jang Mi-inae as Jo Ha-young (Joon-ho's college girlfriend)
- Kim Yoon-kyung as Yoo Mi-ra (Tae-seop's ex-girlfriend)
- Kang Ji-sub as Jang Byung-gyu
- Lee Mi-young as Byung-gyu's mother
- Park Sa-rang as (Ji-yeon and Joon-ho's daughter)
- Kang Yi-seok as (Tae-seop's adopted son)
- Shin Dong-mi as Huh Jong-mi (Ji-yeon's friend)
- Choi Suk-goo as a jewelry distributor
- Kim Myung-kook as a Detective (Tae-seop's boss)
- Choi Jae-won as Ko Pil-doo (Sun-young's dermatologist)
- Jo Sung-kyu

== Awards ==
- 2007 KBS Drama Awards: Excellence Award, Actress in a Serial Drama - Yoon Jung-hee
