= Smile, Mom =

2010 South Korean television drama

- Promotional poster
- Genre: Drama; Romance; Family; Erotica Drama
- Written by: Kim Soon-ok
- Directed by: Hong Sung-chang
- Starring: Lee Mi-sook; Park Won-sook; Ji Soo-won; Yoon Jung-hee; Lee Jae-hwang; Ko Eun-mi; Kang Min-kyung; Im Ye-jin; Kim Yong-gun; Kim Jin-woo; Seo Jun-young
- Country of origin: South Korea
- Original language: Korean
- No. of episodes: 50

Production
- Executive producer: Oh se gang
- Producers: Yong-jin Kim Gil ho Ahn; Lee Hyun-seok Yun Hyeon-hwan
- Running time: Saturdays and Sundays at 20:50 (KST)
- Production companies: Golden Pine; Love Letter

Original release
- Network: SBS
- Release: 6 November 2010 – 24 April 2011

Smile, Mom (Korean: 웃어요, 엄마; RR: Useoyo, eomma) is a 2010 South Korean television drama starring Lee Mi-sook, Park Won-sook, Ji Soo-won, Yoon Jung-hee, Ko Eun-mi and Lee Jae-hwang. The weekend theater drama aired on SBS from November 6, 2010 to April 24, 2011 on Saturdays and Sundays at 20:50 for 50 episodes.

== Plot ==
Smile Mom covers the reconciliation and love stories of 3 pairs of mothers and daughters.

Jo Bok-hee is the mother of three children Shin Dal-rae, Shin Meo-roo and Shin So-ra. For their own well being, Jo Bok-hee pushes them hard to succeed. Shin Dal-rae is a top talent and since she was a young child, she has been dragged to broadcasting companies for auditions. Because of her shy and introverted personality, Shin Dal-rae hates to be in front of the camera, but after her mother and father fought over money, Shin Dal-rae has just followed her mother's will. Shin Meo-roo is Jo Bok-hee's first son and is married to Kang Shin-young. He has a bad habit of being a womanizer. Growing up under the strong will of his mother, Shin Meo-roo has also become a bit of a mama's boy. He is popular and thought to be kind, but he is not responsible and double-faced.

Park Soon-ja is the mother of Kang Shin-young and Kang Do-young. Under her husband's patriarchal attitude, she raised her children and also took care of her parents-in-law and husband. Kang Shin-young assists her husband Shin Meo-roo, who is a politician. She even writes his draft speeches on his behalf. To promote her husband's kind image she showcases her life to the public. Older brother Kang Do-young is incompetent, troubled, and vain.

Yoon Min-joo is the mother of Bae Yeon-woo and Bae Yeon-seo. She was dumped by her husband and raised her two kids alone. Even as a single mother she was able to become a professor. Yoon Min-joo is close friends with Jo Bok-hee. Nevertheless, because Yoon Min-joo was dumped by her husband she has gained a twisted mind. Her son Bae Yeon-woo is the society reporter for a newspaper. His character is cynical, critical and rough. Because of his father, he is indifferent to his mother, hates his family and does not want to marry. Daughter Bae Yeon-seo constantly defies her mother so there's always conflict between the two.

== Cast ==
Mothers

- Lee Mi-sook as Jo Bok-hee
- Park Won-sook as Park Soon-ja
- Ji Soo-won as Yoon Min-joo
- Im Ye-jin as Kang Seo-poong

Children

- Yoon Jung-hee as Kang Shin-young
- Ko Eun-mi as Hwang Bo-mi
- Lee Jae-hwang as Shin Meo-roo

Shin family

- Kang Min-kyung as Shin Dal-rae
  - Jeon Min-seo as young Dal-rae
- Jung Ji-ahn as Shin So-ra
- Kim Yong-gun as Shin Ki-bong
- Kang Ye-seo as Shin Yoo-ra (Meo-roo and Shin-young's daughter)

Kang family

- Yoon Joo-sang as Kang Dong-poong
- Seo Dong-won as Kang Do-young
- Hwang Bo-ra as Kim Mi-so (Do-young's wife)

Bae family

- Kim Jin-woo as Bae Yeon-woo
- Yeo Min-joo as Bae Yeon-seo

Extended cast

- Park Sung-min as Goo Hyun-se
- Seo Jun-young as Lee Kang-so
- Choi Sung-ho as drama PD
- Jung Han-hun as Park Eui-won
- Won Jong-rye as Eui-won's wife
- Jung Chan as Choi Jung-won
- Lee Mi-eun as Hye-ryun
- Lee Hyun-kyung as Kang-so's sister
- Kim Gyu-jin

Guest appearance

- Seo Ji-young
- Chung Lim
- Bae Geu-rin as Baek Jang-mi
- Kim In-suk
- Lee Do-yeop as Yoom Min-joo's ex-husband

== See also ==
- Seoul Broadcasting System
