= Death Bell =

- Theatrical poster
- Hangul: 고사: 피의 중간고사
- RR: Gosa: piui junggangosa
- MR: Kosa: p'iŭi chunggan'gosa
- Directed by: Chang
- Written by: Chang; Kim Eun-kyeong
- Produced by: Hong Jung-pyo; Im Seong-been
- Starring: Lee Beom-soo; Kim Bum; Nam Gyu-ri; Yoon Jung-hee
- Cinematography: Heo Seong-ryong
- Edited by: Yu Yeong-ju
- Music by: Kim Jun-seong
- Production company: Core Contents Media
- Distributed by: SK Telecom
- Release date: August 6, 2008
- Running time: 88 minutes
- Country: South Korea
- Language: Korean
- Budget: ₩1.3 billion
- Box office: US$9.2 million

Death Bell (Korean: 고死: 피의 중간고사; RR: Gosa: Piui junggangosa) is a 2008 South Korean slasher film. The only Korean horror film released over the summer of 2008, it is the first feature by former music video director Chang, who also co-wrote the screenplay. Death Bell stars Lee Beom-soo in his first horror film role, and K-pop singer Nam Gyu-ri in her acting debut. Set in a Korean high school, the film's native title refers to gosa, the important midterm exams that all students are required to sit. It was later followed by a stand-alone sequel, Death Bell 2: Bloody Camp.

== Plot ==
A group of 20 high school students partake in an elite class to prepare for a college exam. Among them are the rebellious Kang I-na, her best friend Yoon Myong-heo, and the class clown Kang Hyun, who harbors an affection for I-na. A few days after incidents involving a student, Beom sees a ghost haunt his paper, and class teacher Hwang Chang-wook discovers scars on his hand. The class is interrupted by a TV showing the top-ranking student, Min Hye-yeong, being trapped in a glass being slowly filled with water. A voice over the PA system announces they are part of a death game with questions that will be posed to the class; failure to answer them in time will lead to the student's death. It also warns them and their two teachers, Hwang Chang-wook and Choi So-yeong, against leaving the school. The class fails to solve the first question to save Hye-yeong.

Despite the warning, the class tries to leave, only to find that a teacher and hall monitor, Mr. Lee, was beaten to death, leaving only security Mr. Kim to guard them. The students split up and tried to answer the questions while also attempting to find a way out. Several students die in brutal death games set up by a mysterious woman as the class solves all the puzzles late, though they later notice that each puzzle contains clue pertaining to a student, Kim Ji-won who died earlier that year under mysterious circumstances. I-na discovers students are dying according to their ranking on the last test. Beom, who earlier tried to strangle I-na and was put in a mental facility, escapes and attempts to kill I-na, but Hyun shields her from the attack and dies. Chang-wook then kills Beom. I-na discovers to her horror that Myong-heo has also been kidnapped by the woman. They succeed in solving the trap, but the killer still kills her by dropping her from the roof, and Chang-wook climbs the roof and strangles the woman to death, whom he recognizes as Ji-won’s mother.

A memorial is held for the students killed, and then I-na is kidnapped unnoticed. One final question is posed: whoever killed his daughter step forward and confess. The person in question, a now-demented Chang-wook, reveals himself and is killed by the mastermind, who turns out to be the security guard, Mr. Kim. I-na is then freed by So-yeong.

Flashbacks reveal that Kim's daughter, Kim Ji-won, worked hard to enter the elite class. However, the parents of the killed students bribed Chang-wook for the entrance test answers, giving them an unfair advantage. After being disqualified and finding out about the plot, Ji-won confronted Chang-wook, and offered him her silence in exchange for his help with her father’s failing business, to which Chang-wook refused, and strangled her to death when she threatened to expose him. Since Ji-won's death, the life of her parents fell apart as the family home was seized by loan sharks. Out of rage, he murdered the loan sharks and, along with his wife, planned their revenge. The sole witness to the incident, Beom, slowly became mad as he felt that Ji-won had been haunting him ever since. Kim and his wife (the woman who hung Myong-heo) find this from the cellphone of their daughters, who had been recording while being strangled, and decide to kill Chang-wook and all the students whose parents they deem responsible for their daughter's death.

The film closes with I-na seeing that she topped the class ranking, and it is implied that Beom's attacks were due to her being possessed by Ji-won since the beginning.

== Cast ==
- Lee Beom-soo as Hwang Chang-wook
- Yoon Jung-hee as Choi So-young
- Nam Gyu-ri as Kang I-na
- Kim Bum as Kang Hyun
- Son Yeo-eun as Yoon Myung-hyo
- Lee El as Guard
- Da Geon as Yoon Soo-jin
- Kong Jung-hwan as Lee Chi-young
- Ham Eun-jung as Kim Ji-won
- Yang Ji-won as Min Hye-young
- Kang Won as Song Dong-hyuk
- Kwon Hyun-sang as Cha Jae-wook
- Son Ho-jun as Jo-Bum
- Moon Woong-ki as Kim Hyung-jin
- Jung Chun-suk as Park Woo-ram
- Lee Chae-won as Yum Ji-hyang
- Yoo Shin-ae as Park Jin-kyung
- Kim So-hee as Kim Ji-won's mother
- Kim Mi-ra as Choi Eun-joo
- Lee Do-hyun as Park Chan-joo
- Noh Haeng-ha as Kim Mi-jin
- Choi Bae-young as Park Hyun-kyung

== Production ==
Shot on HD video with a budget of ₩1.3 billion, Death Bell is the feature film directorial debut of Chang, a former music video director, who also co-wrote the screenplay with Kim Eun-kyeong. The film also marks the acting debut of Nam Gyu-ri, a former singer with K-pop trio SeeYa, and stars veteran comic actor Lee Beom-soo in his first horror film role.

== Release ==
The only Korean horror film to be released in the summer of 2008, Death Bell made its premiere in July 2008 at the 12th Puchon International Fantastic Film Festival. Post-production on the film had been rushed in order to have it ready for the festival, and director Chang had to apologise for the poor state in which it was shown.

Death Bell was released on DVD on 8 November 2008. Asian film specialist, Terracotta Distribution, released the film in the UK on DVD in October 2011.

== Reception ==
=== Critical response ===
Derek Elley of Variety found Death Bell to have a "neat concept" with "enough shocks and gore to keep genre addicts contented", and commented, "After a fairly conventional half-hour setup, the pic keeps the tension high with tight cutting and a no-flab script that ups the student body count in some especially inventive ways. Solution to the whodunit is less convincing than the lead-up, with a finale that doesn't deliver on expectations. But the journey there is fine, with Lee, better known for comedy, interestingly cast as the students' tough prof." Kyu Hyun Kim of Koreanfilm.org was more critical of the film, saying, "Death Bell annoyingly combines prettified, slick visual filmmaking (but with no real depth) and gag-inducing torture porn excesses: it's simultaneously tepid and lackluster on the one hand and gross and offensive on the other"; he also regarded the screenplay as a "fetid mess" with an unconvincing central premise, but gave credit to the performance of Lee Beom-soo. A review for Twitch also labelled the film's premise as "ridiculous", going on to say, "Lee Beom-Soo certainly tries, and the tempo keeps building decently until the end, but there's really no vibe to it. It's just a succession of tortures and murders, with no sense of surprise, no interest... [and] no thematic consciousness whatsoever".

=== Box office ===
Released on 6 August 2008 in 366 theatres nationwide, the film grossed $2,370,785 and received 575,231 admissions on its opening weekend, placing it third at the local box office. By its third week, Death Bell had climbed to second at the box office, and as of 14 September 2008 had grossed a total of $9,274,859.

Death Bell had looked set to become the second most popular Korean horror film after A Tale of Two Sisters, which attracted more than 3 million viewers in 2003; however, admissions of 1,636,149 (as of 14 September 2008) were less than those recorded by R-Point and Wishing Stairs. Nevertheless, the film attracted more than twice the number of viewers required to break even at the box office.

== Accolades ==
=== Awards & Nominations ===
Year	Award	Category	recipient	Result	Ref
2008	The 12th Bucheon International Fantastic Film Festival	Bucheon Choice	Death Bell	Nominated	
2008	17th Buil Film Awards	Best New Actress	Nam Gyu-ri	Nominated	
2008	17th Buil Film Awards	Best Lighting	Park Soon-hong	Nominated	
2009	27th Brussels International Fantastic Film Festival	Thriller Competition	Death Bell	Nominated	
2009	26th Beaune International Thriller Film Festival	Thriller Competition	Death Bell	Nominated	
2009	45th Baeksang Arts Awards	Best New Actress - Movie	Yoon Jung-hee	Nominated	
2009	45th Baeksang Arts Awards	Popularity Award - Movie	Lee Beom-soo	Nominated	
2009	45th Baeksang Arts Awards	Popularity Award - Movie	Nam Gyu-ri	Nominated	
2009	45th Baeksang Arts Awards	Popularity Award - Movie	Yoon Jung Hee	Nominated	
2009	20th Málaga International University Film Festival	Feature Film In Competition	Death Bell	Nominated	
2009	11th Seoul International Youth Film Festival	Feature Film - Korea	Death Bell	Nominated	
2009	4th Haapsalu Horror and Fantasy Film Festival	Nominee Film	Death Bell	Nominated	
2009	3rd Indonesian International Fantastic Film Festival	Nominee Film	Death Bell	Nominated	
2009	The 7th Firenze Korean Film Festival	Nominee Film	Death Bell	Nominated	

== See also ==
- Death Bell 2: Bloody Camp
