= Family's Honor (TV series) =

South Korean television series

- Promotional poster
- Hangul: 가문의 영광
- Hanja: 家門의榮光
- Lit.: Glory of the Family
- RR: Gamunui yeonggwang
- MR: Kamunŭi yŏnggwang
- Genre: Romance, Family, Drama
- Written by: Jung Ji-woo
- Directed by: Park Young-soo
- Starring: Yoon Jung-hee; Park Si-hoo
- Country of origin: South Korea
- Original language: Korean
- No. of episodes: 54

Production
- Executive producer: Hyo Wang
- Production companies: Pumpkin Vine Co., Ltd.

Original release
- Network: SBS TV
- Release: October 11, 2008 – April 19, 2009

Family's Honor (Korean: 가문의 영광) is a South Korean television series starring Yoon Jung-hee, Park Si-hoo, Jeon No-min, Kim Sung-min, Shin Da-eun, Jeon Hye-jin, and Maya. It aired on SBS from October 11, 2008 to April 19, 2009 on Saturdays and Sundays at 21:55 for 54 episodes.

With its strong focus on family traditions and values, the series revolves around the tangled and less than perfect lives of the illustrious Ha family. It centers on the filial granddaughter of the Ha household, played by Yoon Jung-hee. Writer Jung Ji-woo said, "I wanted to write a story about a very backward woman. I wanted to see how a woman who cannot speak up for herself and likes to sew could survive in modern society." Director Park Young-soo added that, "I wanted to revive the significance of our dying traditions. I worked hard to capture that."

== Plot ==
The stories in this series revolve around the members of two families that have strongly contrasting backgrounds. One is a traditional patriarchal family (Ha family) trying its best to uphold the reputation of its family name, while the other is a nouveau riche family (Lee family) that got wealthy from loansharking and other shady business dealings.

Most of the plot centers on the relationship between the youngest granddaughter of the Ha family, Ha Dan-ah (Yoon Jung-hee), and the son of the Lee family, Lee Kang-suk (Park Si-hoo). Dan-ah bears the emotional burden of being widowed at a young age, and is unable to let go of the memory of her husband who died in a serious car accident. She has several unpleasant encounters with Kang-suk, an unscrupulous businessman whose main aim in life is to defeat his opponents in the business arena. A strange turn of events brings this unlikely duo together in a mock dating game, which turns serious as both parties find themselves changing for the sake of the other.

The two main sub-plots focus on the romantic relationships of Dan-ah's twin brothers. The elder is Ha Soo-young (Jeon No-min), a mild, placid man who meets and falls in love with a girl several years his junior (Shin Da-eun). The second brother, Ha Tae-young (Kim Sung-min), is impetuous and outspoken, and finds his match in a tomboyish policewoman (Maya).

As relationships develop and paths cross, the fates of the Ha and Lee families become closely intertwined. In the events that follow, the beliefs and values of both families will be challenged, secrets will be unearthed, and new ties will be forged.

== Cast and characters ==
Ha family

- Yoon Jung-hee as Ha Dan-ah (youngest granddaughter, assistant professor at a university)
- Jeon No-min as Ha Soo-young (eldest grandson, works at Ha Corporation)
- Kim Sung-min as Ha Tae-young (second grandson, works at Ha Corporation)
- Shin Goo as Ha Man-ki (Grandfather Ha, head of household)
- Park Hyun-sook as Ha Joo-jung (sister of Grandfather Ha, borderline alcoholic, works at a TV company)
- Seo In-seok as Ha Seok-ho (son of Grandfather Ha, father of Ha siblings, works at Ha Corporation)
- Park Joon-mok as Ha Dong-dong (great-grandson, son of Ha Tae-young)
- Kim Young-ok as Yoon Sam-wol (housemaid of Grandfather Ha's wife, called "kitchen granny")
- Lee Soo-min as Yoon Jo-man (housemaid)

Lee family

- Park Si-hoo as Lee Kang-suk (son, manages his father's company, business ties with Ha Corporation)
- Jeon Hye-jin as Lee Hye-joo (daughter, student at university, infatuated with Jung Hyun Kyu)
- Yeon Kyu-jin as Lee Chun-gap (father)
- Seo Kwon-soon as Choi Young-ja (mother)

Extended cast

- Lee Hyun-jin as Jung Hyun-kyu (student at university, in love with Ha Dan-ah)
- Shin Da-eun as Oh Jin-ah (office cleaner, develops relationship with Ha Soo-young)
- Maya as Na Mal-soon (traffic police officer, develops relationship with Ha Tae-young)
- Na Young-hee as Lee Young-in (high-ranking employee at Ha Corporation, pregnant with Ha Seok-ho's son)
- Shim Hyun-sup as Kim Byung-do (Joo-jung's co-worker)
- Lee Jong-bak as Officer Lee
- Kim Ye-ryeong as Young-hee
- Seo Yoo-jung as Kim Hyun-ok
- Lee Won-jae as Joo-jung's boss
- Jung Chan as Yoon Tae-joo (Kang-suk's friend)
- Jung Wook as Kim Sun-tae
- Shin Pyo as Kang-ha
- Min Joon-hyun as employee

== Soundtrack ==
1. All I Need is You Alone – 4Men
2. Can I Love You? – 4Men
3. Don't Be Hurt – 4Men
4. Wishing for Love – Noh Young-chae
5. I Will Meet You – 4Men
6. Nice Farewell – Chae Young-in
7. Don't Know – Kim Ji-won
8. Flower Path (Inst.)
9. Glory of the Family (Inst.)

== Awards ==
2009 SBS Drama Awards

- Excellence Award, Actor in a Special Planning Drama - Park Si-hoo
- PD Award - Yoon Jung-hee

Director Park Young-soo was also given an incentive award by SBS for producing a popular, family-oriented drama that has helped to boost the image of the broadcasting company.

== International ==
- It aired in Vietnam on HTV3 from November 16, 2009, called Vinh quang gia tộc

== Remake ==
- Cầu vồng tình yêu - Vietnam (VTV3) (September 15, 2011 to July 5, 2012)
