= Kim Hye-ri (actress) =

South Korean actress (born 1969)

- Born: December 23, 1969 (age 56); Seoul, South Korea
- Education: Dongguk University Graduate School of Culture and Arts
- Occupation: Actress
- Years active: 1988–present
- Agent: Gom Entertainment
- Spouse: Kang Chan-gu (m. 2008; div. 2014)
- Parent: Jo Su-bi (mother)
- Family: Kim Hae-rin (sister)

Korean name
- Hangul: 김혜리
- Hanja: 金慧利
- RR: Gim Hyeri
- MR: Kim Hyeri

Kim Hye-ri (Korean: 김혜리; born December 23, 1969) is a South Korean actress and beauty pageant titleholder.

== Filmography ==
=== Film ===
Year	Title	Role
1986	Byun Kang-swoi	Maid
1991	Death Song	Yun Seong-deok
1992	The Man Who Always Takes the Last Train	Jae-hee
1994	Contract Couple	Hye-jung
1995	Thief and a Poet	
2003	Together	Professor Yu Shifeng's wife
2003	The Legend of the Evil Lake	Queen Jinseong
2004	Clementine	Im Min-seo

=== Television series ===
Year	Title	Role	Network
1991	And Shaky Times	Min-sook	KBS2
1992	City People	Chimera / Kim Ae-ra	MBC
1992	Jealousy	Bae Chae-ri	MBC
1992	See You in the Morning	Soon-yi	KBS2
1993	The Sum is Three	Female owner of cafe	KBS2
1993	Tomorrow Love	Ji-min (guest, episodes 57-62)	KBS2
1993	January		KBS2
1994	Lee Seon-pung's Underworld Excursion	Gisaeng Wolhyang	KBS1
1994	Burnt Rice Woman	Seo Yoon-joo	KBS2
1994	That Window	Jung Eun-seo	SBS
1995	Love Anthem	Hong Ji-sook	SBS
1996	Jo Gwang-jo	Queen Dangyeong	KBS2
1996	Salted Mackerel		MBC
1996	Start	Language teacher	KBS2
1996	Tears of the Dragon	Deok-sil / Kim Hyo-bin	KBS1
1997	Women	Hwa-jung	SBS
1997	Three Women	Cho-hee	KBS2
1998	The King and the Queen	Yang Hye-bin	KBS1
1999	You	Ok-ye	KBS1
1999	Her Choice	Hee-soo	MBC
2000	Taejo Wang Geon	Queen Kang Yeon-hwa	KBS1
2002	Bad Girls	Lee Yeon-hee	SBS
2003	The King's Woman	Dong Jeongwol	SBS
2005	Shin Don	Empress Ki	MBC
2006	High Kick!	Lee Joon-ha's first love Hye-ri (cameo, episode 155)	MBC
2007	Auction House	Min Seo-rin	MBC
2008	The Kingdom of the Winds	Lady Miyoo	KBS2
2011	War of the Roses	Lee Hae-joo	SBS
2013	The Scandal	Go Joo-ran	MBC
2014	Lovers of Music	Yang Joo-hee	KBS2
2015	My Mother Is a Daughter-in-law	Chu Kyung-sook	SBS
2016	The Promise	Park Yugyeong	KBS2
2016	Cinderella with Four Knights	Ji Hwa Ja	TvN
2016	Bubbly Lovely	Na Young-sook	SBS

=== Variety show ===
Year	Title	Notes/Ref.
1988	Show Express	Host
1992	Delightful Studio	Host
1995	수다펀치 팡팡	Host
1996	I Want to Live in a House Like This	Host
2002	Entertainment Weekly	Host
2006	Good Day	Host
2020	King of Mask Singer	Contestant as "Magician" (episodes 249–250)

== Awards and nominations ==
Year	Award	Category	Nominated work	Result
1988	Miss Korea Pageant	Miss World Korea	—N/a	Won
1989	Miss Korea Pageant	Contestant	—N/a	Nominated
1992	KBS Drama Awards	Best New Actress		Won
2001	KBS Drama Awards	Excellence Award, Actress	Emperor Wang Gun	Won
