= Lee Hyo-jung (actor) =

South Korean actor

- Born: January 7, 1961 (age 65); Seoul, South Korea
- Education: Dongguk University - B.A. and M.A. in Theater and Film
- Occupation: Actor
- Years active: 1981–present
- Family: Lee Ki-young (brother); Lee Yoo-jin (son)

Korean name
- Hangul: 이효정
- Hanja: 李曉庭
- RR: I Hyojeong
- MR: I Hyojŏng

Lee Hyo-jung (born January 7, 1961) is a South Korean actor. Lee made his acting debut in 1981, and continues to star in television dramas.

== Filmography ==
=== Television series ===
Year	Title	Role	Network
1986	Nodaji (Rich Artifacts)	Lee Hyo-jung	KBS1
1986	TV Literature: "The Young Zelkova Tree"		KBS1
1988	MBC Bestseller Theater: "Seoul Correspondent"		MBC
1988	MBC Bestseller Theater: "The Shampoo Fairy"	Stalker	MBC
1991	Sunrise Peak	Seok-woo	MBC
1991	Chunbo Day		KBS1
1991	MBC Best Theater: "A Few Days in Hagwiri"	Sang-yeob	MBC
1992	Eyes of Dawn	Kim Ik-ryul	MBC
1992	Jealousy	Lawyer Min	MBC
1992	Tragic Grass	Professor Young-seop	SBS
1992	Three Families Under One Roof		MBC
1992	MBC Best Theater: "Love and then Suddenly One Day, Marriage"	Hyung-seok	MBC
1993	Era of Passion		SBS
1993	Way of Love	Deputy Kim	MBC
1993	Lovers	Han Sang-hoon	KBS2
1993	Dinosaur Teacher	Homeroom teacher Young-woong	SBS
1993	Marriage	Yoo Ki-hoon	SBS
1994	There is No Love	Lee Sang-chul	SBS
1995	Until We Meet Again	Im Seung-guk	SBS
1995	MBC Best Theater: "When Love Shakes"	Won-ho	MBC
1995	MBC Best Theater: "Fate"	Film director Ki-joon	MBC
1995	Apartment	Jang Joon-ha	SBS
1995	Elegy	Yoo-jin	SBS
1996	Life - About the Importance of Living Each Day	Yoo Hye-min's husband	MBC
1996	Two Times One	Lee Wang-poong	HBS
1996	Open Your Heart	Kim Tae-min	MBC
1996	Im Kkeokjeong	King Myeongjong	SBS
1997	MBC Best Theater: "Dream"		MBC
1997	Jae-dong-yi	Ahn Dong-ho	SBS
1997	Spin		KBS2
1998	Seven Brides	Ha-pil	SBS
1998	Legendary Ambition	Yeom Jae-man	KBS2
1999	MBC Best Theater: "Millennial"	Seo-young's husband	MBC
2000	Because of You	Ahn Soo-myung	MBC
2001	Ladies of the Palace	Yun Im	SBS
2001	Open Drama Man and Woman: "A Wife and Her Adulterous Husband"	Psychiatrist Hyun-seop	SBS
2001	Open Drama Man and Woman: "To Stand Alone"	Myung-ho	SBS
2002	The Dawn of the Empire	Ssang-ki	KBS1
2002	Five Brothers and Sisters	Han Joon-gu	SBS
2002	Rustic Period	Yu Chin-san	SBS
2002	Sunrise House	Do Deok-man	SBS
2002	Open Drama Man and Woman: "Dead Husbands"	Hyun-seok	SBS
2002	Open Drama Man and Woman: "Story of Fried Food Seller, Lim Dong-pal’s Entry Into Cabaret"	Hwang Doo-sam	SBS
2003	Escape from Unemployment	Wang Man-soo	SBS
2003	Not Divorced	Han Ki-beom	KBS2
2003	Open Drama Man and Woman	Seung-nam	SBS
2003	Open Drama Man and Woman	Joo-hyuk	SBS
2004	Beijing My Love	Assistant Park	KBS2
2004	Love Is All Around	Jin Young-hwan	MBC
2004	The Age of Heroes	Guk Cheol-min	MBC
2004	Immortal Admiral Yi Sun-sin	Toyotomi Hideyoshi	KBS1
2004	Forgiveness	Park Jung-tae	KBS2
2004	MBC Best Theater: "Beloved Son"	Dad	MBC
2004	Drama City: "Rat-Catching Day"	Deok-ho	KBS2
2005	Drama City: "Golden Forest & Rabbit"	Si-jang	KBS2
2005	Hello My Teacher	Park Joong-seop	SBS
2005	Queen's Conditions	Kim Kwang-soo	SBS
2005	Princess Lulu	Park Jong-chul	SBS
2006	As the River Flows	Song Joon-ho	KBS1
2006	Yeon Gaesomun	King Yeongyang	SBS
2007	Snow in August	Kang Hak-soo	SBS
2008	East of Eden	Cheon Young-seok	MBC
2009	Swallow the Sun	Yoon Je-myung (guest)	SBS
2009	Hometown of Legends: "Fox with Nine Tails"	Park Chun-moo	KBS2
2010	Jejungwon	Baek Kyu-hyun	SBS
2010	Giant	Han Myung-seok	SBS
2010	Kim Su-ro, The Iron King	Yibiga	MBC
2010	The King of Legend	Chu Eung-baek	KBS1
2011	New Tales of Gisaeng	Ma Yi-joon	SBS
2011	City Hunter	Lee Kyung-wan	SBS
2011	The Princess' Man	Shin Suk-ju	KBS2
2011	Dear My Sister	Song Byung-man	KBS2
2012	The Moon and Stars for You	Han Jung-hoon	KBS1
2013	Jang Ok-jung, Living by Love	Min Yoo-joong	SBS
2013	The Secret of Birth	Choi Seok	SBS
2015	My Heart Twinkle Twinkle	Kang Jin-oh	SBS
2018	Children of a Lesser God	Baek Do-gyu	OCN

=== Film ===
Year	Title	Role
1981	A Small Ball Shot by a Midget	
1983	Making a Love	
1983	Iron Men	
1984	Short Embrace, Long Goodbye	
1984	Sweethearts	
1986	Andromeda (short film)	
1989	Memories of Bal-bari	Dal-ho
1990	All That Falls Has Wings	Tae-won
1991	Venus Summer	
2003	Dying Puppy	Choi Mu-cheol
2003	Silmido	Director Oh
2013	Geochang Massacre - Bloody Winter	
2015	Love Clinic	Gil Sin-seol's father

== Theater ==
Year	Title	Role
1989	Memories of Bal-bari	Balbari
1997	Angel of a Hundred Days	
2008	Hamlet	Polonius

== Awards and nominations ==
Year	Award	Category	Nominated work	Result
2008	KBS Drama Awards	Congeniality Award	—N/a	Won
2011	KBS Drama Awards	Excellence Award, Actor in a Daily Drama	Dear My Sister	Nominated
2013	SBS Drama Awards	Special Acting Award, Actor in a Drama Special	Jang Ok-jung, Living by Love	Won
