= The Eldest =

2013 South Korean television series

- Promotional poster
- Hangul: 맏이
- RR: Maji
- MR: Maji
- Genre: Drama; Historical
- Written by: Kim Jung-soo
- Directed by: Lee Kwan-hee
- Starring: Yoon Jung-hee; Jae Hee; Oh Yoon-ah; Park Jae-jung
- Country of origin: South Korea
- Original language: Korean
- No. of episodes: 54

Production
- Running time: 70 minutes
- Production company: Lee Kwan-hee Production

Original release
- Network: JTBC
- Release: September 14, 2013 – March 16, 2014

The Eldest (Korean: 맏이; RR: Maji) is a 2013–2014 South Korean television series starring Yoon Jung-hee, Jae Hee, Oh Yoon-ah and Park Jae-jung. It aired on JTBC from September 14, 2013, to March 16, 2014.

== Synopsis ==
Set between the 1960s and the 1990s, The Eldest tells the story of five siblings after they lost their parents in an accident. It focuses on Young-sun (Yoon Jung-hee), the eldest sister, who raised her brothers and sisters so they would become successful.

== Cast ==
=== Main ===
- Yoon Jung-hee as Kim Young-sun
  - Yoo Hae-jung as young Young-sun
- Jae Hee as Park Soon-taek
  - Chae Sang-woo as young Soon-taek
- Oh Yoon-ah as Lee Ji-sook
  - Roh Jeong-eui as young Ji-sook
- Park Jae-jung as Lee In-ho
  - Oh Jae-moo as young In-ho

=== Supporting ===
==== Young-sun's entourage ====
- Jo Yi-jin as Kim Young-ran
- Kang Eui-sik as Kim Young-doo
- Kim Gyu-sun as Lee Jae-im
- Jung Yoon-hye as Kim Young-sook
- Kim Tae-jin as Kim Young-jae
- Jang Seo-hee as Nan-i

==== Soon-taek's entourage ====
- Yoon Yoo-sun as ??
- Lee Dal-hyung as Park Jae-oh
- Hwang Bo-ra as Park Soon-geum

==== Ji-sook's entourage ====
- Chang Mi-hee as Yoon Yi-sil
- Jin Hee-kyung as Kim Eun-soon
- Lee Jong-won as Gong Chang-rae
- Kim Byung-se as Lee Sang-nam
- Cho Sung-yoon as Kim Jong-bok
  - Lee Hyung-suk as young Jong-bok

==== Others ====
- Ra Mi-ran as Na Mi-soon
- Kim Jin-soo as Son Jae-shik
- Kim Soo-mi as Si-deok's mother
- Jun Won-joo as Choi Sa-yeop
- Cha Kwang-soo as Baek-ho
- Jo Yang-ja as Seo Eun-ja
- Kim Jung-kook as Si-deok
- Cha Min-ji as Eun-joo
- Kim Sol as Kim Mal-soon
- Ahn Jae-min as Lee Joon-soo
- Ahn Ji-hye as Na Tan-sil
- Song Ji-ho as Beom-seok

=== Special appearances ===
- Goo Bon-im as Mrs. Fang
- Im Hyun-sik as Village mayor
- Lee Yong-yi as Village mayor's wife

== Ratings ==
In this table, the blue numbers represent the lowest ratings and the red numbers represent the highest ratings.

Ep.	Original broadcast date	Average audience share (AGB Nielsen)
Ep.	Original broadcast date	Nationwide
1	September 14, 2013	1.254%
2	September 15, 2013	1.227%
3	September 21, 2013	1.250%
4	September 22, 2013	1.174%
5	September 28, 2013	1.625%
6	September 29, 2013	2.091%
7	October 5, 2013	2.120%
8	October 6, 2013	2.631%
9	October 12, 2013	2.030%
10	October 13, 2013	2.572%
11	October 19, 2013	2.486%
12	October 20, 2013	3.349%
13	October 26, 2013	2.406%
14	October 27, 2013	3.395%
15	November 2, 2013	2.553%
16	November 3, 2013	3.505%
17	November 9, 2013	2.583%
18	November 10, 2013	2.681%
19	November 16, 2013	2.232%
20	November 17, 2013	2.557%
21	November 23, 2013	2.467%
22	November 24, 2013	2.967%
23	November 30, 2013	2.172%
24	December 1, 2013	3.161%
25	December 7, 2013	2.671%
26	December 8, 2013	2.999%
27	December 14, 2013	2.350%
28	December 15, 2013	3.072%
28	December 21, 2013	2.372%
30	December 22, 2013	3.254%
31	December 28, 2013	2.498%
32	December 29, 2013	3.583%
33	January 4, 2014	3.151%
34	January 5, 2014	3.079%
35	January 11, 2014	3.195%
36	January 12, 2014	3.509%
37	January 18, 2014	3.251%
38	January 19, 2014	3.292%
39	January 25, 2014	3.343%
40	January 26, 2014	3.537%
41	February 1, 2014	3.243%
42	February 2, 2014	3.747%
43	February 8, 2014	4.150%
44	February 9, 2014	3.945%
45	February 15, 2014	3.401%
46	February 16, 2014	4.277%
47	February 22, 2014	3.499%
48	February 23, 2014	4.059%
49	March 1, 2014	4.057%
50	March 2, 2014	4.260%
51	March 8, 2014	3.735%
52	March 9, 2014	4.641%
53	March 15, 2014	3.462%
54	March 16, 2014	4.592%
Average		2.976%

- This drama airs on a cable channel/pay TV which normally has a relatively smaller audience compared to free-to-air TV/public broadcasters (KBS, SBS, MBC and EBS).
