= Golden Time (TV series) =

- Promotional poster for Golden Time
- Genre: Medical drama; Romance
- Written by: Choi Hee-ra
- Directed by: Kwon Seok-jang; Lee Yoon-jung
- Starring: Lee Sun-kyun; Hwang Jung-eum; Lee Sung-min; Song Seon-mi
- Country of origin: South Korea
- Original language: Korean
- No. of episodes: 23

Production
- Producer: Kim Jin-man
- Production location: South Korea
- Cinematography: Hong Seong-wook; Kim Seon-il; Jung Chan-hong

Original release
- Network: Munhwa Broadcasting Corporation
- Release: July 9 – September 25, 2012

Golden Time (Korean: 골든타임; RR: Goldeuntaim) is a 2012 South Korean television series starring Lee Sun-kyun, Hwang Jung-eum, Lee Sung-min and Song Seon-mi. It aired on MBC from July 9 to September 25, 2012 on Mondays and Tuesdays at 21:55 for 23 episodes.

In emergency medicine, "golden time" or "golden hour" refers to the crucial time period right after a patient suffers a traumatic injury, during which timely medical treatment could determine life or death.

== Plot ==
After spending two years teaching in the country, Lee Min-woo (Lee Sun-kyun) returns to a city hospital to complete his residency and face his own uncertainties about being a doctor. Free-spirited and goofy, he is jaded about his job and just wants it easy. He is then jolted out of apathy when a traumatic incident forces him to rethink why he wanted to be a doctor in the first place. First-year resident Kang Jae-in (Hwang Jung-eum) comes from a rich family that owns hospitals, but she just simply wants to be a doctor who can support herself and help others. Both Min-woo and Jae-in work in ER under the guidance of Choi In-hyuk (Lee Sung-min), a famously astute workaholic surgeon who puts his patients before himself.

== Cast ==
=== Main characters ===
- Lee Sun-kyun as Lee Min-woo
- Hwang Jung-eum as Kang Jae-in
- Lee Sung-min as Choi In-hyuk
- Song Seon-mi as veteran nurse Shin Eun-ah

=== Supporting characters ===
Jae-in's family

- Jang Yong as Kang Dae-je, Jae-in's grandfather
- Sunwoo Yong-nyeo as Park Geum-nyeo, Jae-in's grandmother
- Song Yoo-ha as Bang Seon-woo
- Kim Jong-rae as Dae-je's younger brother

Department of Emergency Medicine

- Jung Kyu-soo as Na Byung-gook
- Kim Ki-bang as Kim Do-hyeong

Department of Orthopedics

- Lee Ki-young as Hwang Se-han
- Jo Sang-ki as Park Seong-jin
- Heo Tae-hee as Go Jae-won
- Ji Il-joo as Yoo Kang-jin

Department of Neurosurgery

- Kim Hyung-il as Kim Ho-young
- Shin Dong-mi as Jo Dong-mi

Department of General Surgery

- Um Hyo-sup as Kim Min-joon
- Hong Ji-min as Song Kyeong-hwa

Department of Anesthesiology

- Jung Seok-yong as Ji Han-goo

Department of Plastic Surgery

- Chun Jae-ho as Park Geun-soo

Department of Trauma Surgery

- Kim Sa-kwon as Jang Hyuk-chan

Extended cast

- Kim Mi-kyung as Min-woo's mother
- Park Young-ji as Oh Gwang-cheol, hospital director
- Park Jeong-min as Jang Young-woo
- Ban Hye-ra as Kang Soo-kyung
- Ga Deuk-hee as Seo Hyo-eun
- Na Seung-ho as Kang Dae-je's secretary
- Seo Ji-yeon as nurse
- Gong Soo-hyuk as association member
- Choi Jae-sub as Park Won-gook
- Hong Hyun-taek as Lee Se-min
- Lee Dong-gyu as Shin Eun-ah's fiancé
- Im Ji-young as woman in childbed
- Yoon Min-soo as mass production member
- Song Young-kyu as Lee Won-pyo
- Jung Ae-yeon as Bang Hee-sun
- Lee Seok-gu as Choi Jun-bae

== Background ==
The series was praised for its verisimilitude and social commentary on the country's lack of trauma centers. The character of trauma specialist Choi In-hyuk was based on real-life doctor Lee Guk-jong, who became famous in 2011 when he saved the life of Captain Seok Hae-kyun after Seok received multiple gunshot wounds during a rescue mission from Somali pirates.

== Ratings ==
With a rise of 5.1 percent in the third week of July 2012, Golden Time landed its first win on the Monday and Tuesday primetime ratings chart after drawing in 12.6 percent of the total viewers, according to data compiled by the TNmS (Total National Multimedia Statistics). The series, which had been struggling at the bottom for its first two weeks with single-digit ratings, made this leap as the former chart-topper The Chaser and runner-up Big wrapped up their runs. With average ratings of 13.3-15.5 percent, it thereafter topped its timeslot for ten consecutive weeks, despite the rival channels' London Olympics 2012 coverage and the premieres of Faith and Haeundae Lovers.

Originally slated at 20 episodes, it was given a 3-episode extension, and discussions are underway for a possible second season.

== Soundtrack ==
This was director Kwon Seok-jang's third collaboration with music director Moon Sung-nam, after Pasta (2010) and My Princess (2011). The soundtrack features songs by indie musicians 10cm, Verbal Jint and Every Single Day. It was released by WinOne Entertainment and LOEN Entertainment.

1. 모래시계 (Hourglass) - Every Single Day
2. 어느날 (One Day) - 10cm
3. 두 뺨에 닿기전에 (Before It Touches Both of My Cheeks) - Byul
4. 오아시스 (Oasis) - Pia & Zico (of Block B)
5. 약한사람 (Weak Person) - Verbal Jint feat. Heo In-chang
6. 해주고 싶은 말 (Words I Want to Tell You) - Melody Day feat. MC Jinri & Zeenan
7. I Miss You - Yoon Gun
8. 너를 되뇌다 (Piano ver.) - Son Seung-yeon feat. Romantisco
9. 그댄 아나요 (Do You Know?) - Scenery with Riding Bicycle feat. Lee Ji-min and Kim Yoo-jin (of W.H.O)
10. Father - Every Single Day
11. 사랑아 가지마 (Love, Don't Go) - Islander
12. I'm in Love With U - Yisun
13. Deep in My Heart - In a Band
14. Cold - Every Single Day
15. 너를 되뇌다 - Son Seung-yeon feat. Romantisco
16. 어느날 (One Day) (Unplugged ver.) - 10cm
17. 오아시스 (Oasis) (Acoustic ver.) - Pia & Zico (of Block B)

== Awards and nominations ==
Year	Award	Category	Recipient	Result
2012	5th Korea Drama Awards	Excellence Award, Actor	Lee Sung-min	Nominated
2012	5th Korea Drama Awards	Excellence Award, Actress	Song Seon-mi	Won
2012	1st K-Drama Star Awards	Acting Award, Actor	Lee Sung-min	Won
2012	25th Grimae Awards	Best Actor	Lee Sung-min	Won
2012	MBC Drama Awards	Drama of the Year	Golden Time	Nominated
2012	MBC Drama Awards	Top Excellence Award, Actor in a Miniseries	Lee Sun-kyun	Nominated
2012	MBC Drama Awards	Excellence Award, Actor in a Miniseries	Lee Sung-min	Nominated
2012	MBC Drama Awards	Excellence Award, Actress in a Miniseries	Hwang Jung-eum	Nominated
2012	MBC Drama Awards	PD Award	Lee Sung-min	Won
2012	MBC Drama Awards	Best Couple Award	Lee Sun-kyun and Hwang Jung-eum	Nominated
2012	MBC Drama Awards	Best Couple Award	Lee Sun-kyun and Lee Sung-min	Nominated
2013	49th Baeksang Arts Awards	Best Actor (TV)	Lee Sung-min	Nominated
2013	49th Baeksang Arts Awards	Best Director (TV)	Kwon Seok-jang, Lee Yoon-jung	Nominated
2013	49th Baeksang Arts Awards	Best Screenplay (TV)	Choi Hee-ra	Nominated

== International broadcast ==
- It aired in Vietnam on SCTV phim tổng hợp, beginning October 7, 2013.
