= Song Seon-mi =

South Korean actress (born 1974)

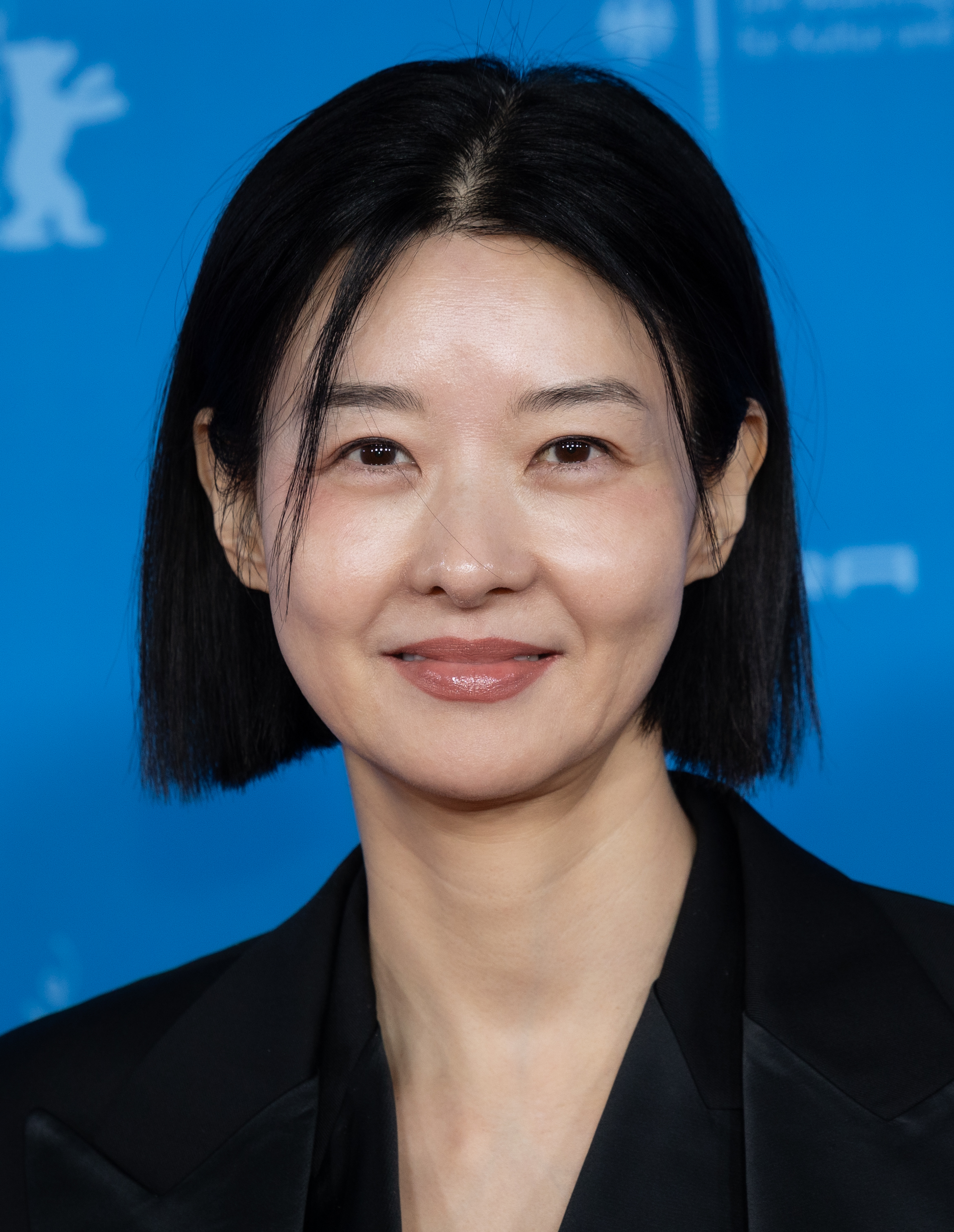
- Song in 2026
- Born: 13 September 1974 (age 52); Taean County, South Chungcheong Province, South Korea
- Education: Dongju College
- Occupation: Actress
- Years active: 1996–present
- Agent: JR ENT
- Spouse: Go Woo-seok (m. 2006; died 2017)
- Children: 1

Korean name
- Hangul: 송선미
- RR: Song Seonmi
- MR: Song Sŏnmi

Song Seon-mi (Korean: 송선미; born 13 September 1974) is a South Korean actress.

== Career ==
Song won second place at the Super Elite Model Contest in 1996, then transitioned from a modeling career to acting a year later in the television drama Model (1997).

In 1998, Song made her film debut playing dual roles as an art gallery employee and a soldier's ex-girlfriend in Lee Jeong-hyang's critically acclaimed romantic comedy Art Museum by the Zoo, opposite Ahn Sung-ki. This was followed by the gangster comedy My Boss, My Hero (2001). Though Song is more active in television, notable in her filmography are many arthouse films by auteur Hong Sang-soo. For Woman on the Beach (2006), she and her co-stars agreed to appear in the film even without reading Hong's script. While in The Day He Arrives (2011), Song played a film studies professor who frequents a bar in Bukchon.

Back on the small screen, her popularity rose when she played a young housewife in Precious Family (2004), written by Kim Soo-hyun. Leading roles followed in The Secret Lovers (2005), One Day Suddenly (2006), Green Coach (2009), Mrs. Town (2009), and Dandelion Family (2010), as well as a supporting role in the well-received medical drama Behind the White Tower (2007).

In 2012, Song was cast as a capable trauma nurse in Golden Time. She later reunited with its director Kwon Seok-jang in Miss Korea (2013), set in 1997 during the IMF crisis.

Song starred in her first ever period drama in 2013's Blooded Palace: The War of Flowers. She drew praise for her portrayal of the Crown Princess Lady Kang, Crown Prince Sohyeon's wife, despite controversy involving a breastfeeding scene.

== Personal life ==
Song married art director Go Woo-seok, who she met through mutual acquaintances and dated for one year, on 29 June 2006. They had a daughter, A-ri, in April 2015. On 21 August 2017, Song's husband was found bleeding in a law office located in Seoul and passed away while he was being transferred to the hospital. At the time, the police revealed that he was murdered by a hitman hired by his cousin for ₩2.00 billion KRW (about $1.67 million USD) as he was trying to help his grandfather sue to recover assets he had been unjustly deprived of.

Eventually, both the cousin and the hitman got arrested and sentenced to prison-life for the cousin who hired the hitman and 18 years for the murderer who stabbed Go Woo-seok. Song also won her lawsuit against the cousin, with the South Korean court ruling in favor of the actress and her daughter to receive ₩1.30 billion KRW (about $1.09 million USD) in compensation for their loss.

In 2009, Song left talent agency Contents Entertainment to join a new agency set up by her former manager Mr. Yu, Hoya Entertainment; this resulted in a breach of contract lawsuit.

In January 2013, she was charged with slander for allegedly insulting Kim Sung-hoon, the CEO of The Contents Entertainment, at a press conference for a drama held in July 2012. Kim was also linked to actress Jang Ja-yeon's death, after three witness testified against him, Kim was found guilty of abuse by the Korean courts, specifically of forcing girls from his agency to come to his birthday party where he forced them to sexually entertain the executives.

== Filmography ==
=== Television series ===
Year	Title	Role	Network
1997	Model	Kim Yi-joo	SBS
1997	Woman Next Door		SBS
1998	Soonpoong Clinic	Nurse Song Seon-mi	SBS
1999	You're One-of-a-Kind	Mi-yeon	MBC
1999	Magic Castle	Bang Ae-ja	KBS2
1999	Did We Really Love?		KBS2
2000	Love Story: "Host of Memory"	Hee-soo	SBS
2000	I Want to Keep Seeing You	Jang Hye-won	SBS
2000	The More I Love You	Song Da-young	MBC
2000	Fireworks	Heo Min-ji	SBS
2002	Hard Love	Yoo Won-hee	KBS2
2004	War of the Roses	Oh Mi-ran	MBC
2004	Precious Family	Song Ah-ri	KBS2
2005	The Secret Lovers	Jung Ah-mi	MBC
2006	One Day Suddenly	Go Eun-hye	SBS
2007	Behind the White Tower	Lee Yoon-jin	MBC
2007	Daughters-in-Law	Cha Soo-hyun	KBS2
2009	Green Coach	Han Ji-won	SBS
2009	Mrs. Town	Oh Da-jung	tvN
2010	Blossom Sisters	Park Ji-won	MBC
2010	Personal Taste	Bride (cameo, episode 2)	MBC
2010	Life Is Beautiful	Song Na-yeon	SBS
2011	Ojakgyo Family	Nam Yeo-eul	KBS2
2012	Golden Time	Shin Eun-ah	MBC
2012	Cheongdam-dong Alice	Artemis's costumer (cameo)	SBS
2013	KBS Drama Special: "Their Perfect Day"	Jung Soo-ah	KBS2
2013	Blooded Palace: The War of Flowers	Crown Princess Lady Kang	jTBC
2013	Miss Korea	Go Hwa-jung	MBC
2016	Memory	Han Jung-Won	tvN
2017	Return of Lucky Pot	Park Seo-jin	MBC
2017	The Guardians	Chae Hye-sun	MBC
2019	Love Alarm	Jeong Mi-mi	Netflix
2020	Private Lives	Kim Mi-sook	JTBC
2020	Start-Up	Cha Ah-hyun	tvN
2020	Live On	Eun-taek's mother	JTBC
2021	Bossam: Steal the Fate	Kim Gae-shi	MBN
2021	Mine	Seo Jin-kyung	tvN
2021	Crime Puzzle	Park Jeong-ha	Olleh TV ,KT seezn, SKY TV

=== Film ===
Year	Title	Role
1998	Art Museum by the Zoo	Da-hye
2001	My Boss, My Hero	Lee Ji-seon
2002	Can't Live Without Robbery	Hwang Ma-ri
2003	Scent of Love	Choi Jeong-ran
2003	Round 1	
2003	The Silver Knife	Ga-ryeon
2004	Mokpo the Harbor	Im Ja-kyung
2004	Liar	Oh Jung-ae
2006	Woman on the Beach	Choi Sun-hee
2011	The Day He Arrives	Bo-ram
2017	On the Beach at Night Alone	Jun-hee
2022	Walk Up	Sunhee

=== Variety shows ===
Year	Title	Notes
1996	Wild Country	Host
1996	Our Happy Saturday	Host
1999	머리가 좋아지는 TV	Host
2003	Discovery of Reading	Host
2011	Couple of the Century	Host
2013	Talk Club Actors	Host

== Theater ==
Year	Title	Role
2009	Turn Around and Leave	Chae Hee-ju
2011	The Blue Room	
2012–2013	Right There	Jung
2022–2023	Miners Painters	Helen Sutherland

== Bibliography ==
Year	Title	Publisher	ISBN
2009	Lovely Skin by Song Seon-mi	Sallim Life	ISBN 9788952213105

== Awards and nominations ==
Year	Award	Category	Nominated work	Result
1999	20th Blue Dragon Film Awards	Best Supporting Actress	Tell Me Something	Nominated
2012	5th Korea Drama Awards	Excellence Award, Actress	Golden Time	Won
2013	KBS Drama Awards	Excellence Award, Actress in a One-Act/Special/Short Drama	Their Perfect Day	Nominated
2017	MBC Drama Awards	Excellence Award, Actress in a Soap Opera	Return of the Fortunate Bok	Won
