= Every Single Day (band) =

South Korean rock band

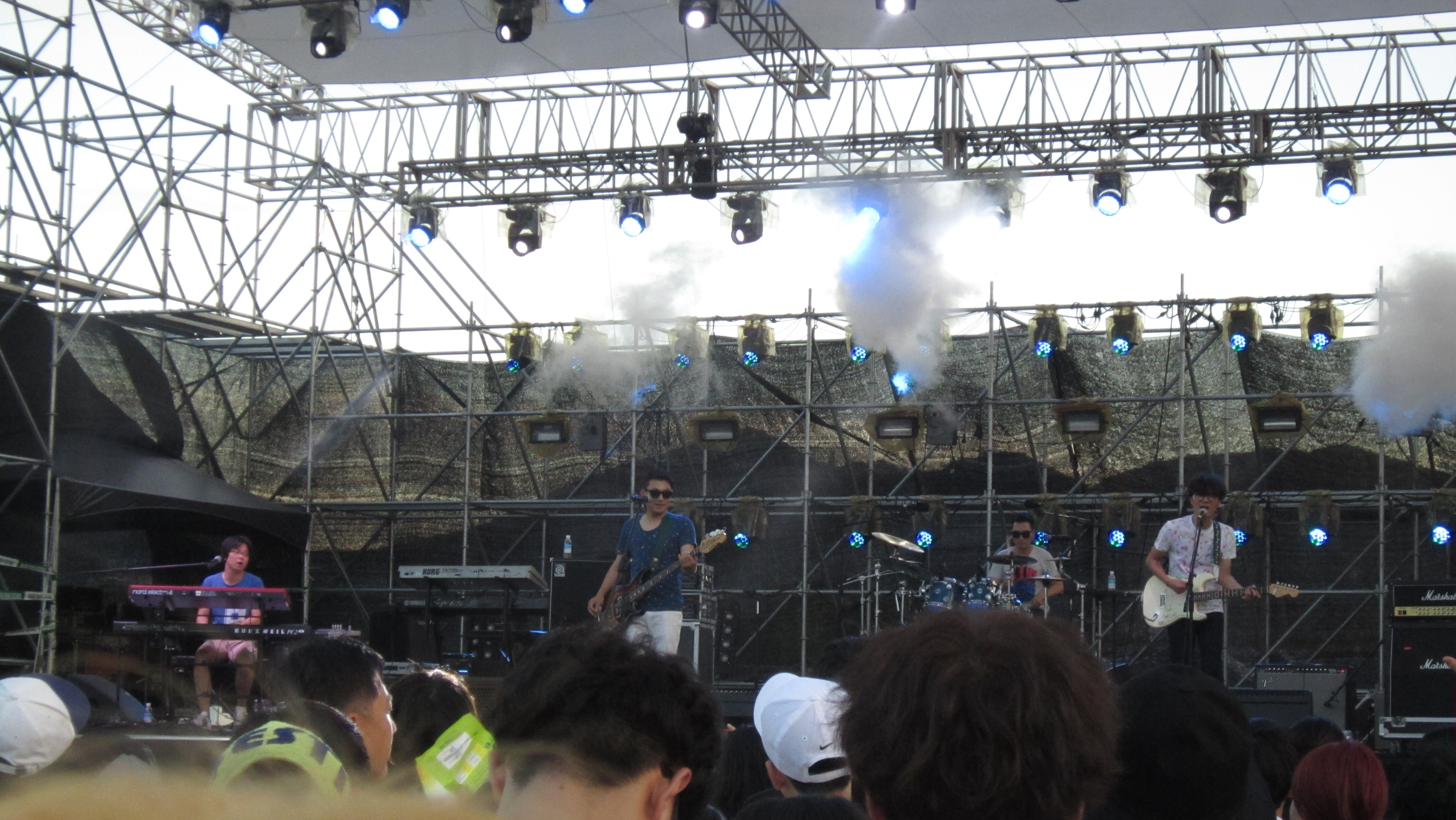
- Every Single Day in 2015

Background information
- Origin: Seoul, South Korea
- Genres: K-rock; post-rock
- Years active: 1997–present
- Labels: Mini Communication Dapjang; Mirrorball Music
- Members: Moon Sung-nam; Jung Jae-oo; Kim Hyo-young
- Past members: Gang Moon-chul; Choi Seung-won; Yoo Hyo-jun

Every Single Day (Korean: 에브리싱글데이), is a South Korean rock band formed in 1997. The group debuted as a trio with Moon Sung-nam (vocals, bass), Jung Jae-oo (guitar), and Gang Moon-chul (drums).

== History ==
=== 1997–99: Formation and first album ===
Every Single Day was formed in Busan in 1997 by singer and bassist Moon Sung-nam, guitarist Jung Jae-oo, and drummer Gang Moon-chul. In 1999, they relocated to Seoul to release their first album, entitled Broken Street.

=== 2000–10: Subsequent releases and personnel changes ===
In 2000, drummer Gang Moon-chul left the band and was replaced by Choi Seung-won. In 2001, the band's first EP, entitled Happy Birthday, was released. In 2004, they issued their second album, the self-titled Every Single Day. This was followed by Tom's Diary in 2007, and shortly after, Choi Seung-won left the band, to be replaced by Yoo Hyo-jun. In 2008, the band released their fourth album, entitled The Bright Side.

=== 2010–present: Soundtrack contributions and new music ===
In 2010, Every Single Day wrote music for the MBC drama Pasta. In 2011, they did the same for MBC's drama series My Princess. Later that year, the band issued their fifth studio album, titled Moment.

Between 2012 and 2015, Every Single Day contributed music to a number of television shows, including Golden Time, Cheongdam-dong Alice, I Can Hear Your Voice, Miss Korea, Gap-dong, Pinocchio, and The Time We Were Not in Love. In 2015, they released their sixth studio album, titled Nothing of It.

The band subsequently continued their soundtrack contributions with the shows Strong Girl Bong-soon, Confession Couple, Because This Is My First Life, Jugglers, Still 17, and Special Labor Inspector.

== Band members ==
Current

- Moon Sung-nam – vocals, bass
- Kim Hyo-young – drums

Past

- Jung Jae-oo – guitar
- Gang Moon-chul – drums
- Choi Seung-won – drums
- Yoo Hyo-jun – drums

== Discography ==
Studio albums

- Broken Street (1999)
- Every Single Day (2004)
- Tom's Diary (2007)
- The Bright Side (2008)
- Moment (2011)
- Nothing of It (2015)

EPs

- Happy Birthday (2001)
- Sky Bridge (2013)
- Lucky Day (2015)
