= Seo Sook-hyang =

South Korean television screenwriter

- Born: South Korea
- Occupation: Screenwriter
- Agent: S.M. C&C

Korean name
- Hangul: 서숙향
- RR: Seo Sukhyang
- MR: Sŏ Sukhyang

Seo Sook-hyang is a South Korean television screenwriter. She made her writing debut after 나의 가장 사랑스러운 적 won at a KBS drama-writing competition and aired in December 2002 on the single-episode anthology Drama City. Seo became best known for writing low-key romantic comedy-dramas, notably Pasta (2010), which focuses on an arrogant chef at an Italian restaurant and his meek yet determined underling. She continued to collaborate with Pasta TV director Kwon Seok-jang on Romance Town (2011) and Miss Korea (2013).

== Filmography ==
- When the Stars Gossip (tvN, 2025)
- Iron Family (KBS2, 2024–2025)
- Wok of Love (SBS, 2018)
- Don't Dare to Dream (SBS, 2016)
- Miss Korea (MBC, 2013–2014)
- Romance Town (KBS2, 2011)
- Pasta (MBC, 2010)
- Lawyers of the Great Republic of Korea a.k.a. Love and Law (MBC, 2008)
- Mr. Goodbye (KBS2, 2006)
- Rebirth: Next (MBC, 2005)
- Drama City "쑥과 마늘에 관한 진실" (KBS2, 2003)
- Drama City "오줌장군" (KBS2, 2003)
- Drama City "나의 가장 사랑스러운 적" (KBS2, 2002)
