= Miss Korea (TV series) =

South Korean television series

- Promotional poster for Miss Korea
- Genre: Romance; Drama; Life; Comedy
- Written by: Seo Sook-hyang
- Directed by: Kwon Seok-jang
- Starring: Lee Yeon-hee; Lee Sun-kyun
- Composer: Every Single Day
- Country of origin: South Korea
- Original language: Korean
- No. of episodes: 20

Production
- Executive producer: Kim Sang-ho
- Producer: Kim Ho-young
- Running time: 59 minutes
- Production company: S.M. C&C

Original release
- Network: MBC TV
- Release: December 18, 2013 – February 26, 2014

Miss Korea (Korean: 미스코리아) is a South Korean television series starring Lee Sun-kyun, Lee Yeon-hee, Lee Mi-sook, Lee Sung-min, Song Seon-mi, and Lee Ki-woo. It aired for 20 episodes on MBC from December 18, 2013, to February 26, 2014.

== Plot ==
Set in the year 1997, a cosmetics company is in bad financial shape during the IMF crisis, so to save the company, Hyung-joon along with his fellow employees attempt to make 25-year-old Ji-young into Miss Korea, a nationwide beauty pageant winner. Back in their high school days, Ji-young was the most beautiful and popular girl on campus, but she now works as an elevator girl.

== Cast ==
=== Main ===
- Lee Yeon-hee as Oh Ji-young

25 years old, "Dream" department store's elevator girl. She was Kim Hyung-joon's junior in high school and his first love.

- Lee Sun-kyun as Kim Hyung-joon

29 years old, president of ViVi cosmetics, who has huge debt to loan sharks (for his cosmetics factory) and additionally needs money to launch a new developed product of his company - BB cream.

- Lee Mi-sook as Ma Ae-ri

54 years old, ex-Miss Korea, owner of Queen Beauty Salon, coach of future Miss Korea.

- Lee Sung-min as Jung Seon-saeng

39 years old, gangster working for a loan shark. He is assigned to Kim Hyung-joon to ensure collecting debt from him. His given name (Seon-saeng) means teacher in Korean. Because of that, his full name sounds like family name with title (teacher Jung).

- Song Seon-mi as Go Hwa-jung

31 years old, chief researcher of ViVi cosmetics.

- Lee Ki-woo as Lee Yoon

29 years old, investment agent of M&A company Human Partners Korea. He was Kim Hyung-joon's classmate in high school.

=== Supporting ===
==== Queen Beauty Salon ====
- Ko Sung-hee as Kim Jae-hee, Miss Korea candidate, coached by Queen Beauty Salon. Daughter of congressman Kim Sung-chul.
- Heo Seung-jae as Yoon Sil-jang, Ma Ae-ri's assistant
- Park Guk-sun as Choi Soo-yeon, Miss Korea candidate, coached by Queen Beauty Salon.
- Kang Tae-oh as Ma Ae-ri's son

==== Cherry Beauty Salon ====
- Hong Ji-min as Yang Choon-ja, owner of Cherry Beauty Salon. Ma Ae-ri's ex-assistant who become her rival.
- Kang Han-na as Im Seon-joo, Miss Korea candidate, coached by Cherry Beauty Salon.
- Ha Yeon-joo as Shin Sun-young, Miss Korea candidate, coached by Cherry Beauty Salon.

==== ViVi Cosmetics ====
- Oh Jung-se as Kim Heung-sam, planning director of ViVi cosmetics
- Choi Jae-hwan as Kim Kang-woo, researcher of ViVi cosmetics
- Jo Sang-ki as Kim Kang-shik, director of BaDa cosmetics, Kim Kang-woo's older brother

==== Oh Ji-young's family ====
- Jang Yong as Oh Jong-goo, Oh Ji-young's grandfather
- Jung Kyu-soo as Oh Myun-sang, Oh Ji-young's father
- Jung Suk-yong as Oh Woong-sang, Oh Ji-young's uncle
- Baek Bong-ki as Oh Ji-seok, Oh Ji-young's brother

==== "Dream" department store ====
- Jang Won-young as Department head Park
- Yoo Eun-ho as Jung Eun-ah, "Dream" department store elevator girl
- Kim Ye-won as Lee Young-sun, "Dream" department store elevator girl
- Park Ha-na as Han So-jin, "Dream" department store elevator girl
- Moon Ji-in as Kim Yoo-ra, "Dream" department store elevator girl

==== Others ====
- Go In-beom as congressman Kim Sung-chul, Kim Jae-hee's father
- Im Ye-jin as Go Bong-hee, Kim Hyung-joon's mother
- Jung Seung-kil as President Hwang, loan shark
- Oh Min-ae as Director Choi
- Jung So-min as gas station attendant whom Ma Ae-ri targets to become Miss Korea 1998 (cameo, ep 20)

== Ratings ==
In the table below, the blue numbers represent the lowest ratings and the red numbers represent the highest ratings.

| Episode # | Original broadcast date | Average audience share | | | |
| Episode # | Original broadcast date | TNmS Ratings | | AGB Nielsen | |
| Episode # | Original broadcast date | Nationwide | Seoul National Capital Area | Nationwide | Seoul National Capital Area |
|---|---|---|---|---|---|
| 1 | December 18, 2013 | 7.6% | 8.7% | 7.0% | 8.0% |
| 2 | December 19, 2013 | 7.1% | 9.5% | 7.3% | 8.4% |
| 3 | December 25, 2013 | 8.2% | 10.6% | 7.7% | 8.1% |
| 4 | December 26, 2013 | 8.1% | 9.9% | 7.7% | 8.5% |
| 5 | January 1, 2014 | 8.1% | 8.9% | 9.5% | 10.8% |
| 6 | January 2, 2014 | 8.3% | 10.2% | 8.9% | 9.6% |
| 7 | January 8, 2014 | 6.9% | 7.6% | 7.4% | 8.4% |
| 8 | January 9, 2014 | 8.5% | 11.0% | 8.5% | 9.4% |
| 9 | January 15, 2014 | 6.8% | 7.9% | 6.8% | 7.7% |
| 10 | January 16, 2014 | 7.9% | 9.8% | 7.1% | 7.6% |
| 11 | January 22, 2014 | 7.3% | 9.0% | 7.1% | 7.2% |
| 12 | January 23, 2014 | 8.6% | 8.6% | 6.7% | 7.5% |
| 13 | January 29, 2014 | 5.6% | 6.5% | 5.9% | 6.8% |
| 14 | January 30, 2014 | 8.9% | 9.8% | 8.6% | 10.0% |
| 15 | February 5, 2014 | 6.4% | 7.4% | 6.8% | 7.8% |
| 16 | February 6, 2014 | 7.5% | 8.2% | 7.3% | 8.2% |
| 17 | February 13, 2014 | 5.7% | 6.2% | 4.8% | 4.9% |
| 18 | February 19, 2014 | 6.8% | 7.9% | 7.0% | 8.6% |
| 19 | February 20, 2014 | 5.8% | 7.0% | 5.9% | 7.3% |
| 20 | February 26, 2014 | 5.5% | 5.6% | 6.2% | 7.0% |
| Average | | 7.2% | 8.4% | 7.2% | 8.1% |

== Original soundtrack ==
Miss Korea Original Sound Track

Soundtrack album by Various Artists
- Released: February 14, 2014
- Genres: Pop, K-pop, soundtrack, R&B
- Labels: KT Music; SM Entertainment

| No. | Title | Artist | Length |
|---|---|---|---|
| 1. | "Moonlight" | Onew | 3:45 |
| 2. | "Take My Hands" | Every Single Day | 2:46 |
| 3. | "Hero" | J-Min | 3:04 |
| 4. | "New World" | Every Single Day | 4:19 |
| 5. | "그럴 수 있잖아 (It's Just Me)" (It Happens (It's Just Me)) | Oksang Dalbit |
| 6. | "Heartbreaker" | Bada Kim feat. Every Single Day | 2:46 |
| 7. | "Street of Angels" | Every Single Day | 4:17 |
| 8. | "Boss Jung Sonatine" | Various Artists |
| 9. | "Cynical View" | Various Artists |
| 10. | "Drum Tension" | Various Artists |
| 11. | "El Topo" | Various Artists |
| 12. | "Hero Strings" | Various Artists |
| 13. | "Ironic Waltz" | Various Artists |
| 14. | "Long Live the Queen" | Various Artists |
| 15. | "Nostalgia" | Various Artists |
| 16. | "Pure Desire" | Various Artists |
| 17. | "Transience of Life" | Various Artists |
| 18. | "Wait Alone" | Various Artists |
| 19. | "Warning" | Various Artists |

== Awards and nominations ==
| Year | Award | Category | Recipient | Result |
|---|---|---|---|---|
| 2014 | 7th Korea Drama Awards | Best New Actress | Ko Sung-hee | Nominated |
| 2014 | MBC Drama Awards | Top Excellence Award, Actress in a Miniseries | Lee Yeon-hee | Nominated |
| 2014 | MBC Drama Awards | Excellence Award, Actor in a Miniseries | Lee Sun-kyun | Nominated |
| 2014 | MBC Drama Awards | Golden Acting Award, Actress | Lee Mi-sook | Won |
| 2014 | MBC Drama Awards | Best New Actress | Ko Sung-hee | Won |

== See also ==
- Miss Korea
