= Diary of a Night Watchman =

2014 South Korean TV drama

- Promotional poster
- Also known as: The Night Watchman's Journal; The Records of a Night Watchman; The Night Watchman; Night Shift of the Joseon Police; Night Rangers' Tale
- Hangul: 야경꾼 일지
- RR: Yagyeongkkun ilji
- MR: Yagyŏngkkun ilchi
- Genre: Historical; Suspense; Fantasy; Romance
- Written by: Yoo Dong-yoon
- Directed by: Lee Joo-hwan
- Starring: Jung Il-woo; Ko Sung-hee; Jung Yun-ho; Seo Yea-ji
- Country of origin: South Korea
- Original language: Korean
- No. of episodes: 24

Production
- Production company: Raemongraein

Original release
- Network: MBC TV
- Release: August 4 – October 21, 2014

Diary of a Night Watchman (Korean: 야경꾼 일지; lit. 'Night Watchman's Journal') is a 2014 South Korean television series starring Jung Il-woo, Ko Sung-hee, Jung Yun-ho and Seo Yea-ji. It aired on MBC from August 4 to October 21, 2014 on Mondays and Tuesdays at 22:00 for 24 episodes.

== Plot ==
Prince Rin found himself orphaned when his father, King Haejong — under a spell — killed the queen and then committed suicide. Considered unsuitable for the throne, the child prince was sent away from the palace and his older half-brother, Gi-san, son of a concubine, was crowned the new king of Joseon.

Twelve years later, Rin, now grown up, spends his days between fun and amorous encounters, hiding the loneliness he feels and his ability to see ghosts, acquired after escaping the attack of a spirit when he was a child. One day, Rin meets Do-ha, a young shaman from Mount Baekdu who is searching for her older sister. Besides Do-ha, a Taoist priest, Sadam, arrives in Hanyang, chosen by the king to expel an evil spirit that haunts him, actually a result of the sovereign's madness. Twelve years before, as the head of the Yongshin tribe, Sadam was able to revive the dragon god that his people worshiped. Seeing it defeated and turned into a statue shortly after by King Haejong, who secretly brought the artifact to the palace and hid it in the basement, Sadam's goal is to find the statue and resurrect the dragon god, exploiting the negative energy of evil spirits. For this purpose, Sadam convinces the new king to reopen a door sealed long ago to prevent resentful ghosts to enter, and the town is once again haunted.

Upon learning of Sadam's plan, Rin decides to revive the Night Watchmen, a group of soldiers that, at the time of his father, faced monsters and spirits, but were killed with the advent of the new king. By his side are Do-ha, with whom he falls in love, Kang Moo-seok, a swordsman who initially doesn't believe in the supernatural, and Jo Sang-heon, the former captain of the Night Watchmen. While the battle against Sadam rages, Rin also brings to light the truth behind the death of his parents.

== Cast ==
=== Main characters ===
- Jung Il-woo as Lee Rin/Wolgwang
  - Kim Hwi-soo as young Rin

The "bad boy" legitimate heir to the throne who rejects his wealth and honor to live a rebellious life. When Rin gains the ability to see ghosts, he becomes a night watchman. In chasing ghosts and experiencing the plight of citizens firsthand, he eventually learns to be a good prince.

- Ko Sung-hee as Do-ha
  - Lee Chae-mi as young Do-ha

She is imbued with supernatural energy from Mt. Baekdu, and can communicate with nature. Her older sister is Yeon-ha.

- Jung Yun-ho as Kang Moo-seok
  - Yoo Seung-yong as young Kang Moo-seok

A night watchman who is a cold-hearted man of few words, but popular with the ladies.

- Seo Yea-ji as Park Soo-ryeon
  - Kang Joo-eun as young Park Soo-ryeon

A young noblewoman who will stop at nothing to become the crown prince's bride. She is the daughter of the prime minister, and Moo-seok's cousin.

=== Supporting characters ===
- Yoon Tae-young as Jo Sang-heon

Head of the Night Watchmen crew.

- Kim Heung-soo as Gi-san
  - Lee Tae-woo as young Gi-san

An illegitimate prince who challenges his younger brother Lee Rin for power, and makes a political play for the throne. Capricious and vile, he often sees another self who accuses him of being inadequate as a king, and instills doubts about the loyalty of his subjects.

- Kim Sung-oh as Sadam

A psychic who worships a serpent monster deep in the heart of Mt. Baekdu. The serpent monster, an imugi, is a mythological creature that starts out as a giant serpent and amasses power to become a dragon. Sadam tries to raise the dormant imugi and harness its power to take over the world.

- Lee Jae-yong as Park Soo-jong

The ambitious prime minister. He is the mastermind behind Queen Min's death.

- Ko Chang-seok as Fat Minister Jung-seung

The former prime minister killed by Park Soo-jong. He watches over Lee Rin as a ghost.

- Lee Se-chang as Eunuch Song

A eunuch who was in charge of Lee Rin before he was killed by King Haejong. He watches over Lee Rin as a ghost.

- Kang Ji-woo as Rang

A ghost girl who watches over Lee Rin. She is later revealed as Queen Min.

- Seo Yi-sook as Dowager Queen Chungsoo

Rin and Gi-san's grandmother.

- Moon Bo-ryung as Mo Yeon-wol

A merchant who helps Sadam.

- Jung Woo-sik as Ho-jo

Sadam's servant.

- Shim Eun-jin as Ok-mae

Owner of an inn. She's in love with Sang-heon.

- Ah Young as Hong Cho-hee

A waitress at Ok-mae's inn.

- Ahn Jung-hoon as Mr. Chun

A man that works at Ok-mae's inn.

- Jo Dal-hwan as Maeng Sa-kong

Sang-heon's friend. He was once a night watchman, and is in love with Ok-mae.

- Kim So-yeon as Kang In-hwa

Moo-seok's younger sister. She died of smallpox.

- Lee Ha-yool as Dae-ho

Moo-seok's friend.

=== Guest/cameo appearances ===
- Yoo Da-in as Yeon-ha

Do-ha's older sister and a shaman. She fell in love with King Haejong and offered her soul to Sadam in exchange for the king's heart, which is why he turned evil. Sadam embodied her soul in the corpse of a woman, who became Mo Yeon-wol.

- Choi Won-young as King Haejong

In his youth, he was once a legendary hero of the people after he and his fellow night watchmen defeated an imugi in Mt. Baekdu. In his days as a warrior, he saves a woman who preserves the energy of Mt. Baekdu, and she falls in love with him at first sight. Haejong is a good king and father to his sons, but the ghost-seeing gift-curse eventually turns him into an evil tyrant.

- Song Yi-woo as Queen Min

Rin's mother.

- Jeon Hye-young as Sa-wol

Soo-ryeon's maid.

- Cho Seung-hee as Young-geun

Spy woman. Appears in episode 8.

- Hwang Seok-jeong as Dangkol Eomi

Do-ha's spiritual mother.

- Alice as Mae-hyang

A gisaeng. All her customers are mysteriously killed.

- Kim Kyul as Ghost of unmarried bachelor

A student who loved Mae-hyang. He died without being able to confess his feelings, and now kills Mae-hyang's customers.

== Ratings ==
Ep.	Original broadcast date	Average audience share			
Ep.	Original broadcast date	TNmS		AGB Nielsen	
Ep.	Original broadcast date	Nationwide	Seoul	Nationwide	Seoul
1	August 4, 2014	11.8%	14.4%	10.9%	12.1%
2	August 5, 2014	11.5%	14.3%	10.8%	11.7%
3	August 11, 2014	11.2%	13.3%	11.0%	11.7%
4	August 12, 2014	12.1%	14.8%	11.3%	12.1%
5	August 18, 2014	12.0%	14.3%	12.1%	13.4%
6	August 19, 2014	13.3%	16.7%	12.7%	14.3%
7	August 25, 2014	12.3%	15.1%	12.2%	13.2%
8	August 26, 2014	12.6%	15.0%	12.1%	13.0%
9	September 2, 2014	11.3%	13.7%	12.1%	13.9%
10	September 2, 2014	8.5%	10.5%	8.6%	9.8%
11	September 8, 2014	10.3%	12.8%	9.6%	10.4%
12	September 9, 2014	12.1%	14.7%	11.6%	12.9%
13	September 15, 2014	10.9%	13.3%	11.3%	13.5%
14	September 16, 2014	12.1%	14.6%	12.2%	14.2%
15	September 22, 2014	10.4%	12.5%	10.3%	11.3%
16	September 23, 2014	10.3%	12.2%	9.5%	10.0%
17	September 29, 2014	10.1%	13.6%	10.5%	11.9%
18	September 30, 2014	9.7%	12.2%	10.2%	10.9%
19	October 6, 2014	9.9%	12.6%	9.3%	10.3%
20	October 7, 2014	10.5%	13.4%	9.7%	10.6%
21	October 13, 2014	9.9%	12.6%	9.3%	10.2%
22	October 14, 2014	10.8%	13.2%	11.5%	12.2%
23	October 20, 2014	9.1%	11.0%	11.5%	12.8%
24	October 21, 2014	11.7%	14.6%	12.5%	14.2%
Average		11.0%	13.6%	11.0%	12.1%

== Awards and nominations ==
Year	Award	Category	Recipient	Result
2014	MBC Drama Awards	Top Excellence Award, Actor in a Special Project Drama	Jung Il-woo	Won
2014	MBC Drama Awards	Excellence Award, Actor in a Special Project Drama	U-Know Yunho	Nominated
2014	MBC Drama Awards	Best New Actress	Ko Sung-hee	Won
2014	MBC Drama Awards	Best New Actress	Seo Yea-ji	Nominated
2014	MBC Drama Awards	Best Couple Award	Jung Il-woo and Ko Sung-hee	Nominated

== International broadcast ==
It began airing in Japan on cable channel KNTV on December 14, 2014.

It began airing in Thailand on PPTV on March 29, 2015, dubbed as Asawin Rattikal. ("อัศวินรัตติกาล", literally: The Dark Knight).
