= When the Stars Gossip =

2025 South Korean television series

- Promotional poster
- Hangul: 별들에게 물어봐
- Lit.: Ask the Stars
- RR: Byeoldeurege mureobwa
- MR: Pyŏldŭrege murŏbwa
- Genre: Science fiction; Romantic comedy
- Written by: Seo Sook-hyang
- Directed by: Park Shin-woo
- Starring: Lee Min-ho; Gong Hyo-jin
- Music by: Nam Hye-seung
- Country of origin: South Korea
- Original language: Korean
- No. of episodes: 16

Production
- Running time: 70 minutes
- Production companies: KeyEast; MYM Entertainment
- Budget: ₩50 billion

Original release
- Network: tvN
- Release: January 4 – February 23, 2025

When the Stars Gossip (Korean: 별들에게 물어봐) is a 2025 South Korean television series written by Seo Sook-hyang, directed by Park Shin-woo, and starring Lee Min-ho, Gong Hyo-jin, Oh Jung-se, and Han Ji-eun. The series follows the fateful encounter of a space tourist and an astronaut on a space station. It aired on tvN every Saturday and Sunday at 21:20 (KST) from January 4 to February 23, 2025. It is also available for streaming on Netflix in selected regions.

== Synopsis ==
The series centers on Eve (Gong Hyo-jin), a commander overseeing a space station, and Gong-ryong (Lee Min-ho), a gynecologist who visits the station for a few days as a space tourist.

== Cast and characters ==
=== Main ===
- Lee Min-ho as Gong Ryong

An obstetrician-gynecologist with a strong sense of responsibility who arrives at the space station as a tourist.

- Gong Hyo-jin as Eve Kim

A Korean-American astronaut.

- Oh Jung-se as Kang Kang-su

A space experiment expert who has been on the space station for ten months.

- Han Ji-eun as Choi Go-eun

The CEO of MZ Electronics, Choi Jae-ryong's daughter, and Gong Ryong's fiancée.

=== Supporting ===
People at MCC

- Kim Joo-hun as Park Dong-ah

A veteran astronaut who has been to the space station three times, and also a member of Seoul's MCC with Eve Kim.

- Lee El as Kang Tae-hee

A world-famous astronaut and the first Korean-American woman to become IOU Space Center Vice President.

- Lee Cho-hee as Dona Lee

Mina Lee's twin sister. A space doctor of IOU who checks the overall medical condition of the astronauts of Expedition 3.

- Lee Hyun-kyun as Han Si-won

A director of flight operations.

- Park Ye-young as Ma Eun-soo

MCC's mouse experimental partner.

People at ILS

- Lee Cho-hee as Mina Lee

A space scientist in charge of plants, and Dona Lee's twin sister.

- Heo Nam-jun as Lee Seung-joon

A space scientist in charge of mice.

- Alex Hafner as Santiago Gonzalez Garcia.

An astronaut from IOU Space Center.

People at MZ Group

- Kim Eung-soo as Choi Jae-ryong

The chairman of MZ Group.

- Baek Eun-hye as Na Min-jung

A pediatrics and adolescents doctor at MZ Hospital.

- Kim Kyung-duk as Secretary Go

Go-eun's secretary.

- Im Sung-jae as Jeon Yi-man

Professor of Obstetrics and Gynecology at MZ Hospital.

People around Gong Ryong

- Jeon Soo-kyeong as Ji Hwa-ja

Ryong's mother.

- Choi Jung-won as Jang Mi-hwa
- Jung Young-joo as Jung Na-mi

=== Special appearances ===
- Jo Jung-suk as newscaster
- Park Jin-joo as a reporter

== Production ==
=== Casting ===
On November 18, 2021, it was revealed that Lee Min-ho and Gong Hyo-jin were in talks to take on the lead roles of a new drama series written by writer Seo Sook-hyang. On January 26, 2022, it was revealed that Oh Jung-se was offered a role which was under review. On March 28, 2022, Lee and Gong were confirmed as the lead actors.

=== Filming ===
Filming began in April 2022. On February 8, 2023, Lee Min-ho announced on his Instagram account that the filming of the series had ended.

== Release ==
The series premiered on January 4, 2025, at 21:20 (KST). It is also available to stream exclusively on Netflix.

== Original soundtrack ==
=== Part 1 ===
Released on January 5, 2025
No.	Title	Lyrics	Music	Artist	Length
1.	"Feel Like a Million"	Nam Hye-seung; Park Jin-ho	Nam Hye-seung; Park Jin-ho	Big Naughty	3:19
2.	"Feel Like a Million"		Nam Hye-seung; Park Jin-ho		3:19
Total length:					6:38

== Viewership ==
When the Stars Gossip : South Korea viewers per episode (thousands)

Season	Episode number																Average
Season	1	2	3	4	5	6	7	8	9	10	11	12	13	14	15	16	Average
1	890	969	628	744	462	721	425	521	500	673	454	572	436	454	393	593	590

Source: Audience measurement performed nationwide by Nielsen Korea.

Average TV viewership ratings
Ep.	Original broadcast date	Average audience share (Nielsen Korea)	
Ep.	Original broadcast date	Nationwide	Seoul
1	January 4, 2025	3.324% (1st)	3.818% (1st)
2	January 5, 2025	3.883% (1st)	3.910% (1st)
3	January 11, 2025	2.237% (4th)	2.679% (3rd)
4	January 12, 2025	2.781% (2nd)	3.042% (1st)
5	January 18, 2025	1.8% (NR)	1.939% (6th)
6	January 19, 2025	2.905% (4th)	3.076% (2nd)
7	January 25, 2025	1.826% (10th)	2.144% (2nd)
8	January 26, 2025	2.199% (5th)	2.321% (1st)
9	February 1, 2025	2.075% (4th)	2.078% (3rd)
10	February 2, 2025	2.693% (1st)	2.791% (1st)
11	February 8, 2025	1.898% (3rd)	1.786% (3rd)
12	February 9, 2025	2.073% (2nd)	2.039% (2nd)
13	February 15, 2025	1.852% (3rd)	2.103% (3rd)
14	February 16, 2025	1.928% (2nd)	1.980% (1st)
15	February 22, 2025	1.783% (3rd)	2.097% (2nd)
16	February 23, 2025	2.550% (1st)	2.517% (1st)
Average		2.363%	2.520%
In the table above, the blue numbers represent the lowest ratings and the red numbers represent the highest ratings.; This drama aired on a cable channel/pay TV which normally has a relatively smaller audience compared to free-to-air TV/public broadcasters (KBS, SBS, MBC, and EBS).
