= Blossom Sisters =

- Promotional poster
- Also known as: Dandelion Family; Like a Dandelion
- Genre: Romance; Family; Drama
- Written by: Kim Jung-soo
- Directed by: Im Tae-woo
- Starring: Song Seon-mi; Maya; Lee Yoon-ji; Jung Chan; Jung Woo; Kim Dong-wook; Yoo Dong-geun; Yang Mi-kyung
- Country of origin: South Korea
- Original language: Korean
- No. of episodes: 50

Production
- Producer: Oh Hyun-chang

Original release
- Network: MBC
- Release: January 30 – July 25, 2010

Blossom Sisters (Korean: 민들레 가족; RR: Mindeulle gajok; lit. Dandelion Family) is a 2010 South Korean weekend family drama series starring Song Seon-mi, Maya, Lee Yoon-ji, Jung Chan, Jung Woo, Kim Dong-wook, Yoo Dong-geun and Yang Mi-kyung. It aired on MBC from January 30 to July 25, 2010 on Saturdays and Sundays at 19:55 for 50 episodes.

== Plot ==
Blossom Sisters covers the lives of three sisters.

Eldest sister Ji-won (Song Seon-mi) is married to a dentist (Jung Chan) from a wealthy family. Although her husband is deemed perfect by everyone else, he controls every aspect of Ji-won's life. He demands she keep the same weight as when she was 23, chooses her clothes, and expects a full report of how she spent her day. In time, the husband's oppressive behavior leads Ji-won to question her marriage.

Middle sister Mi-won (Maya) met her boyfriend (Jung Woo) in college, and they eloped. They live together even though they're not married.

Youngest sister Hye-won (Lee Yoon-ji) represents women of the newer generation. She believes her career is more important than marriage. Due to pressure from her parents, Hye-won enters a contract marriage with her colleague Jae-ha (Kim Dong-wook). She then starts to discover the true meaning of love and life.

== Cast ==
=== Park family ===
- Yoo Dong-geun as Park Sang-gil, father
- Yang Mi-kyung as Kim Sook-kyung, mother
- Song Seon-mi as Park Ji-won, eldest daughter
- Maya as Park Mi-won, middle daughter
- Lee Yoon-ji as Park Hye-won, youngest daughter
- Jung Chan as Min Myung-seok, Ji-won's husband
- Jung Woo as Kim No-sik, Mi-won's live-in boyfriend
- Baek Jin-ki as Kim Yong-yi, Mi-won's son

=== Lee family ===
- Kim Ki-seob as Lee Hyo-dong, father
- Kim Dong-wook as Lee Jae-ha, son
- Oh Young-shil as Lee Jae-kyung, daughter
- Hong Hak-pyo as Gong Byung-goo, Jae-kyung's husband

=== Extended cast ===
- Lee Mi-young as Lee Pil-nam
- Kim Jung-min as Jung Tae-hwan
- Jung Ae-ri as Yoon Sun-hee
- Oh Jung-se as Jae-hoon/Jay
- Lee Byung-wook as Jung Sung-jae, department head
- Kim Kyung-hwa as Kim, team leader
- Maeng Chang-jae as Choi Jin-moo
- Im Hyun-sung as Jung-pil
- Jeon In-taek
- Shim Yang-hong
