= Suits (South Korean TV series) =

2018 South Korean television series

- Promotional poster
- Hangul: 슈츠
- RR: Syucheu
- MR: Syuch'ŭ
- Genre: Legal drama
- Based on: Suits by Aaron Korsh
- Developed by: KBS Drama Production
- Written by: Kim Jung-min
- Directed by: Kim Jin-woo
- Starring: Jang Dong-gun; Park Hyung-sik
- Country of origin: South Korea
- Original language: Korean
- No. of episodes: 16

Production
- Executive producers: Sebastian Dong-hun Lee; Moon Bo-hyun; Park Ki-ho; Park Seong-hye
- Producer: Kim Hye-jung
- Camera setup: Single-camera
- Running time: 60 minutes
- Production companies: Monster Union; EnterMedia Pictures Co. Ltd.; NBCUniversal International Television

Original release
- Network: KBS2
- Release: April 25 – June 14, 2018

Related
- Suits (American version); Suits (Japanese version)

Suits (Korean: 슈츠) is a 2018 South Korean television series starring Jang Dong-gun and Park Hyung-sik. The drama is based on the American television series of the same name by Aaron Korsh. It aired on KBS2 starting April 25, 2018 on Wednesdays and Thursdays at 22:00 (KST) for 16 episodes.

== Synopsis ==
A distinguished lawyer Choi Kang-seok (Jang Dong-gun) recruits a young man named Go Yeon-woo (Park Hyung-sik) who has a retentive memory but not a law degree.

== Cast ==
=== Main ===
- Jang Dong-gun as Choi Kang-seok

A legendary lawyer. He is the equivalent of Harvey Specter, portrayed by Gabriel Macht.

- Park Hyung-sik as Go Yeon-woo

A genius rookie lawyer with an excellent memory. He is the equivalent of Michael Ross, portrayed by Patrick J. Adams.

- Chae Jung-an as Hong Da-ham

Choi Kang-seok's capable assistant. She is the equivalent of Donna Paulsen, portrayed by Sarah Rafferty.

- Jin Hee-kyung as Kang Ha-yeon

Co-founder of "Kang & Ham". She is the equivalent of Jessica Pearson, portrayed by Gina Torres.

- Ko Sung-hee as Kim Ji-na

A paralegal who is perfect in what she does. She is the equivalent of Rachel Zane, portrayed by Meghan Markle.

- Choi Gwi-hwa as Chae Geun-sik

A lawyer and Kang-seok's rival. He is the equivalent of Louis Litt, portrayed by Rick Hoffman.

=== Supporting ===
- Hwang Tae-gwang as Lawyer Huang
- Choi Yu-hwa as Jae-hee

Choi Kang-seok's informant who collects information and complete missions in secret for him.

- Lee Si-won as Se-hee
- Lee Tae-sun as Seo Gi-woong
- Son Yeo-eun as Kim Moon-hee
- Ye Soo-jung as Yoon-woo's grandmother
- Jang In-sub as Jang Seok-hyun
- Lee Jung-hyuk as Kim Jin-kyu
- Jang Yoo-sang as Park Joon-gyu
- Kim Young-ho as Ham Ki-taek

=== Special appearances ===
- Im Kang-sung as Prosecutor
- Lee Yi-kyung as Park Joon-pyo (ep. 1–2)
- Bewhy as himself (ep. 3–4)
- Jang Shin-young as Na Joo-hee (ep. 3–4)

Kang-seok's ex-girlfriend.

- Kwon Hyuk as Nam Sang-moo
- Son Sook as Madame Bae (ep. 4)
- Son Suk-ku as David Kim (ep. 5–6, 13, 15)
- Nam Gi-ae as CEO Sim Young-joo (Namyoung's CEO)
- Jeon No-min as Oh Byung-wook (ep. 7)

== Production ==
- The remake was first announced in 2015, with the rights being sold to Korea's EnterMedia Pictures Co. Ltd.
- Suits is the second Korean drama co-produced by NBCUniversal after Moon Lovers: Scarlet Heart Ryeo and the third series overall after Saturday Night Live Korea.
- This is Jang Dong-gun's first small-screen comeback in six years.

== Original soundtrack ==
Suits OST

Soundtrack album by Various Artists
- Released: 2018
- Genre: Soundtrack
- Language: Korean
- Labels: NaymNaym Entertainment; Stone Music Entertainment

=== Part 1 ===
Released on April 25, 2018
No.	Title	Artist	Length
1.	"Dream"	DK (December)	3:02
2.	"Dream" (Inst.)		3:02
Total length:			6:04

=== Part 2 ===
Released on May 2, 2018
No.	Title	Artist	Length
1.	"If The Winds Blows" (바람 불면)	Jung Eun-ji	3:45
2.	"If The Winds Blows" (Inst.)		3:45
Total length:			7:30

=== Part 3 ===
Released on May 9, 2018
No.	Title	Artist	Length
1.	"You In The Dream" (꿈 속의 그대)	Mamamoo	3:06
2.	"You In The Dream" (Inst.)		3:06
Total length:			6:12

=== Part 4 ===
Released on May 16, 2018
No.	Title	Artist	Length
1.	"Rainy Road You And I" (비 오는 거리 너와 나)	Kang Min-kyung (Davichi), Kisum	3:50
2.	"Rainy Road You And I" (Inst.)		3:50
Total length:			7:40

=== Part 5 ===
Released on May 23, 2018
No.	Title	Artist	Length
1.	"Now"	Vromance	3:10
2.	"Now" (Inst.)		3:10
Total length:			6:20

=== Part 6 ===
Released on May 30, 2018
No.	Title	Artist	Length
1.	"Propose" (프로포즈)	GB9	3:57
2.	"Propose" (Inst.)		3:57
Total length:			7:54

=== Part 7 ===
Released on June 7, 2018
No.	Title	Artist	Length
1.	"Calling You"	LAURA	4:20
2.	"Calling You" (Inst.)		4:20
Total length:			8:40

=== Part 8 ===
Released on June 13, 2018
No.	Title	Artist	Length
1.	"When I'm With You"	MLC	3:15
2.	"When I'm With You" (Inst.)		3:15
Total length:			6:30

== Ratings ==
Ep.	Original broadcast date	Title	Average audience share			
Ep.	Original broadcast date	Title	Nielsen Korea		TNmS	
Ep.	Original broadcast date	Title	Nationwide	Seoul	Nationwide	Seoul
1	April 25, 2018	Fate gets decided by the choice you make, not coincidence. (운명을 결정짓는 건, 우연이 아니라 선택이다.)	7.4% (10th)	7.5% (9th)	8.2% (12th)	8.7%
2	April 26, 2018	If you have a chance to throw a dice, throw it without hesitating. The moment you throw it, you'll advance at least one square. (주사위를 던질 기회가 왔다면, 주저 말고 던져라. 던지는 순간 최소한 한 칸은 전진한다.)	7.4% (11th)	7.0% (11th)	7.7% (12th)	8.1%
3	May 2, 2018	There always lies a dark side behind the face of the truth. Therefore... (진실의 얼굴 뒤에는 언제나 어두운 이면이 존재한다.)	9.7% (7th)	10.6% (6th)	8.0% (11th)	8.5%
4	May 3, 2018	...Therefore, the truth doesn't always win just because it shows itself. (...그러므로, 진실이 얼굴을 드러낸다고 항상 승리하는 것은 아니다.)	9.7% (7th)	10.2% (5th)	8.4% (10th)	8.9%
5	May 9, 2018	To catch a hyena, you must use rotten meat as your bait. (하이에나를 잡으려면, 썩은 고기를 미끼로 써야 한다.)	8.9% (8th)	9.1% (7th)	7.8% (10th)	8.2%
6	May 10, 2018	They drink the same water, but cows make milk, whereas snakes make poison. (같은 물을 마시지만, 소는 우유를 만들고, 뱀은 독을 만든다.)	7.9% (9th)	7.7% (9th)	6.5% (19th)	6.8%
7	May 16, 2018	Is a sheath truly unnecessary for a knife called justice? (정의라는 칼에는 칼집이 필요 없는가?)	8.8% (8th)	8.7% (7th)	7.8% (13th)	8.1%
8	May 17, 2018	Justice is giving back everyone what they rightfully deserve. (정의란 각자가 당연히 받아야 할 것을 돌려주는 것이다.)	7.4% (11th)	7.1% (14th)	6.8% (19th)	7.2%
9	May 23, 2018	You can't go back in time and start over again, but you can still aim for a new ending starting from now. (과거로 돌아가 새롭게 시작할 순 없지만 현재로부터 새로운 결말을 맺을 순 있다.)	9.9% (7th)	9.5% (6th)	10.3% (8th)	10.7%
10	May 24, 2018	You can prove your worth by showing the kind of risk you are willing to take. (당신의 가치를 증명하는 건 어떤 종류의 위험을 감수하느냐에 달려있다.)	9.6% (7th)	9.2% (8th)	10.3% (8th)	10.5%
11	May 30, 2018	If you wish to swallow a demon, you must swallow its horns too. (악마를 삼키려면 뿔까지 목구멍으로 넘겨야 한다.)	8.8% (7th)	8.5% (7th)	8.8% (10th)	9.1%
12	May 31, 2018	If you have blind faith about your ideals, you'll be betrayed by the reality. (이상을 맹신하면, 현살에 배신 당한다.)	9.8% (6th)	9.7% (6th)	8.7% (11th)	8.9%
13	June 6, 2018	The moment you fly up with wings called lies, you will not be landing. (거짓말이라는 날개를 달고 이륙한 순간 착륙은 없다.)	8.4% (6th)	8.8% (5th)	8.7%	9.0%
14	June 7, 2018	The best way to keep a secret is... not telling it to anyone. (비밀을 지키는 가장 완벽한 방법은 아무에게도 말해주지 않는 것이다.)	9.2% (5th)	9.7% (4th)	9.6%	10.1%
15	June 13, 2018	When you lose your destination, look back on the path that you've walked thus far. (목적지를 잃었을 땐, 걸어온 길을 돌아보라.)	9.1% (3rd)	9.5% (3rd)	9.1%	9.4%
16	June 14, 2018	Life will not tell you... where the destination is. (삶은 당신에게 목적지를 알려주지 않는다.)	10.7% (5th)	11.3% (4th)	10.0%	10.6%
Average			8.9%	9.1%	8.5%	8.8%
In the table above, the blue numbers represent the lowest ratings and the red numbers represent the highest ratings.

== Awards and nominations ==
Year	Award	Category	Recipient	Result	Ref.
2018	11th Korea Drama Awards	Excellence Award, Actress	Chae Jung-an	Won	
2018	6th APAN Star Awards	Excellence Award, Actor in a Miniseries	Park Hyung-sik	Nominated	
2018	6th APAN Star Awards	Best Supporting Actor	Choi Gwi-hwa	Nominated	
2018	2nd The Seoul Awards	Best Supporting Actress	Ko Sung-hee	Nominated	
2018	2018 KBS Drama Awards	Top Excellence Award, Actor	Jang Dong-gun	Nominated	
2018	2018 KBS Drama Awards	Excellence Award, Actor in a Miniseries	Jang Dong-gun	Won	
2018	2018 KBS Drama Awards	Excellence Award, Actor in a Miniseries	Park Hyung-sik	Nominated	
2018	2018 KBS Drama Awards	Best Supporting Actor	Choi Gwi-hwa	Nominated	
2018	2018 KBS Drama Awards	Best Supporting Actress	Ko Sung-hee	Nominated	
2018	2018 KBS Drama Awards	Best New Actor	Son Seok-gu	Nominated	
2018	2018 KBS Drama Awards	Netizen Award	Park Hyung-sik	Won	

== In popular culture ==
- In episode 23 of Marry Me Now, one of the characters is seen watching episode 8 of this drama series.
