= Maya (singer) =

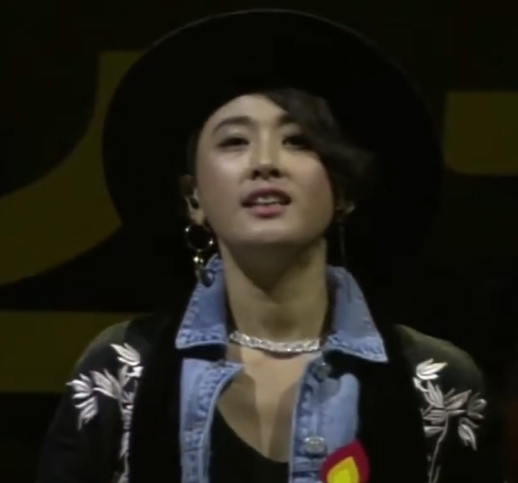
- Maya in 2019
- Born: 17 November 1979 (age 46); South Korea
- Education: Seoul Institute of the Arts
- Occupations: Singer; actress
- Years active: 2003–present
- Musical career
- Genres: Rock, pop rock
- Instrument: Vocals

Korean name
- Hangul: 김영숙
- RR: Gim Yeongsuk
- MR: Kim Yŏngsuk

Stage name
- Hangul: 마야
- RR: Maya
- MR: Maya

Kim Young-sook (Korean: 김영숙; born 17 November 1979), better known as Maya (마야) is a South Korean pop rock singer and actress. She debuted in 2003 with the album, Born To Do It, which included the hit single "Azalea."

== Discography ==
=== Studio albums ===
Title	Album details	Peak chart positions	Sales
Title	Album details	KOR	Sales
Born To Do It	Released: 26 February 2003; Label: Seoul Entertainment; Formats: CD, cassette	46	KOR: 6,825+
Rock Star	Released: 13 May 2004; Label: Seoul Entertainment; Formats: CD, cassette	9	KOR: 20,916+
Girls Generation (소녀시대)	Released: 1 July 2005; Label: Seoul Entertainment; Formats: CD, cassette	7	KOR: 61,636+
Road To Myself	Released: 9 November 2006; Label: Seoul Entertainment; Formats: CD, cassette	12	KOR: 9,106+
Maya Four	Released: 8 April 2008; Label: Sony; Formats: CD, cassette	23	KOR: 3,635+

== Filmography ==
=== Television ===
- Bodyguard (KBS2, 2003)
- Nursery Story (MBC, 2003)
- Magic (SBS, 2004)
- Family's Honor (SBS, 2008)
- Blossom Sisters (MBC, 2010)
- Dream of the Emperor (KBS1, 2012)
- Ugly Alert (SBS, 2013)

=== Film ===
- What Is Natural? (2003)

== Accolades ==
=== Awards and nominations ===
Year	Award	Category	Nominated work	Result
2003	5th Mnet Asian Music Awards	Best New Female Artist	Azalea	Won
2003	18th Golden Disk Awards	Best Pop Award		Won
2003	14th Seoul Music Awards	Best New Artist		Won
2003	KBS Drama Awards	Best New Actress	Bodyguard	Won
2009	SBS Drama Awards	Best Supporting Actress in a Special Planning Drama	Family's Honor	Nominated
2010	MBC Drama Awards	Best New Actress	Dandelion Family	Nominated

=== State honors ===
Name of country, year given, and name of honor
Country	Year	Honor	Ref.
South Korea (Note: Honors are given at the Korean Popular Culture and Arts Awards, arranged by the Korea Creative Content Agency and hosted by the Ministry of Culture, Sports and Tourism. They are awarded to those who have contributed to the arts and South Korea's pop culture.)	2010	Minister of Culture, Sports and Tourism Commendation	
