= Jang Yong =

South Korean actor (born 1945)

- Born: April 8, 1945 (age 81); South Korea
- Education: Seoul Institute of the Arts; Hanyang University - Theater and Film
- Occupation: Actor
- Years active: 1971–present

Korean name
- Hangul: 장용
- Hanja: 張勇
- RR: Jang Yong
- MR: Chang Yong

Jang Yong (Korean: 장용; born April 8, 1945) is a South Korean actor.

== Filmography ==
=== Television series ===
- Hold Me Tight (MBC, 2018)
- Our Gap-soon (SBS, 2016-2017)
- Five Enough (KBS2, 2016)
- Flower of Queen (MBC, 2015)
- Miss Korea (MBC, 2013)
- Wang's Family (KBS2, 2013)
- Ad Genius Lee Tae-baek (KBS2, 2013)
- My Lover, Madame Butterfly (SBS, 2012)
- Golden Time (MBC, 2012)
- My Husband Got a Family (KBS2, 2012)
- Insu, the Queen Mother (jTBC, 2011)
- Poseidon (KBS2, 2011)
- Miss Ripley (MBC, 2011)
- The Thorn Birds (KBS2, 2011) (cameo)
- Twinkle Twinkle (MBC, 2011)
- Paradise Ranch (SBS, 2011)
- Please Marry Me (KBS2, 2010)
- Three Sisters (SBS, 2010)
- Pasta (MBC, 2010)
- Cain and Abel (SBS, 2009)
- The Road Home (KBS1, 2009)
- My Life's Golden Age (MBC, 2008)
- You Are My Destiny (KBS1, 2008)
- Auction House (MBC, 2007)
- Winter Bird (MBC, 2007)
- Air City (MBC, 2007)
- Dear Lover (SBS, 2007)
- Thank You (MBC, 2007) (cameo)
- A Happy Woman (KBS2, 2007)
- Miracle (MBC, 2006)
- Love Truly (MBC, 2006)
- Goodbye Solo (KBS2, 2006)
- My Rosy Life (KBS2, 2005)
- A Farewell to Sorrow (KBS2, 2005)
- Be Strong, Geum-soon! (MBC, 2005)
- Spring Day (SBS, 2005)
- Tropical Nights in December (MBC, 2004)
- Oh Feel Young (KBS2, 2004)
- Full House (KBS2, 2004)
- Terms of Endearment (KBS2, 2004)
- More Beautiful Than a Flower (KBS2, 2004)
- A Problem at My Younger Brother's House (SBS, 2003)
- Damo (MBC, 2003)
- Perfect Love (SBS, 2003)
- Cats on the Roof (MBC, 2003)
- Yellow Handkerchief (KBS1, 2003)
- Trio (MBC, 2002)
- Like a Flowing River (SBS, 2002)
- Hyun-jung, I Love You (MBC, 2002)
- Sunlight Upon Me (MBC, 2002)
- This is Love (KBS1, 2001)
- Well Known Woman (SBS, 2001)
- Flower Garden (KBS2, 2001)
- The Full Sun (KBS2, 2000)
- Truth (MBC, 2000)
- You Don't Know My Mind (MBC, 1999)
- Love in 3 Colors (KBS2, 1999)
- Ad Madness (KBS2, 1999)
- See and See Again (MBC, 1998)
- Crush (KBS2, 1998)
- Romance (SBS, 1998)
- Because I Love You (SBS, 1997)
- Professor and Masseur (SBS, 1997)
- The Reason I Live (MBC, 1997)
- I Love You Face to Face (KBS2, 1997)
- Emotion Generation (EBS, 1996)
- Love Blooming in the Classroom II (KBS2, 1996)
- Men of the Bath House (KBS2, 1995)
- Thief (SBS, 1995)
- String (KBS1, 1995)
- Hospice Ajumma (MBC, 1995)
- West Palace (KBS2, 1995)
- Blue Heart Always (EBS, 1994)
- Goodbye (SBS, 1994)
- Outing of Forty Two (KBS2, 1993)
- Always Like a Movie (KBS2, 1993)
- The Compatibility is Right (SBS, 1992)
- While You Were Dreaming (KBS2, 1990)
- Carousel (KBS1, 1989)
- TV's The Art of War (KBS2, 1987)
- Mountain Station (KBS2, 1987)
- Honey, I'm Sorry (KBS2, 1986)
- Separation Then Love (KBS2, 1986)
- Criminal (KBS2, 1985)
- Daughter I Like More (KBS1, 1984)
- When Spring Comes (KBS1, 1984)
- Daughter's Smile (KBS1, 1984)
- Sleuth (KBS2, 1983)
- Opening (KBS1, 1983)
- Now is the Time to Love (KBS2, 1981)
- Maechon Yarok (KBS2, 1981)
- Sleuth (TBC, 1975)
- Prime Minister Kim Hong-jip (TBC, 1974)

=== Film ===
- Saving My Hubby (2002)
- Indian Summer (2001)
- Trio (1997)
