= Ko Sung-hee =

South Korean actress (born 1990)

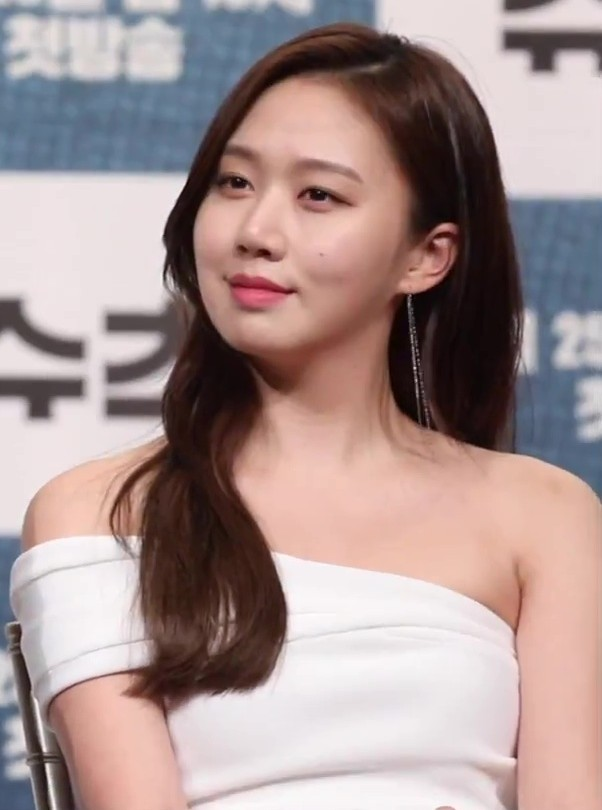
- Ko in April 2018
- Born: June 21, 1990 (age 36); Missouri, U.S.
- Citizenship: South Korea
- Education: Sungkyunkwan University (Department of Acting Arts)
- Occupation: Actress
- Years active: 2013–present
- Agent: MSTeam Entertainment
- Height: 170 cm (5 ft 7 in)
- Spouse: Unknown (m. 2022)
- Children: 1

Korean name
- Hangul: 고성희
- RR: Go Seonghui
- MR: Ko Sŏnghŭi
- Website: msteam.co.kr

Ko Sung-hee (Korean: 고성희; born June 21, 1990) is a South Korean actress. She played her first leading role in the fantasy-period drama Diary of a Night Watchman (2014).

== Personal life ==
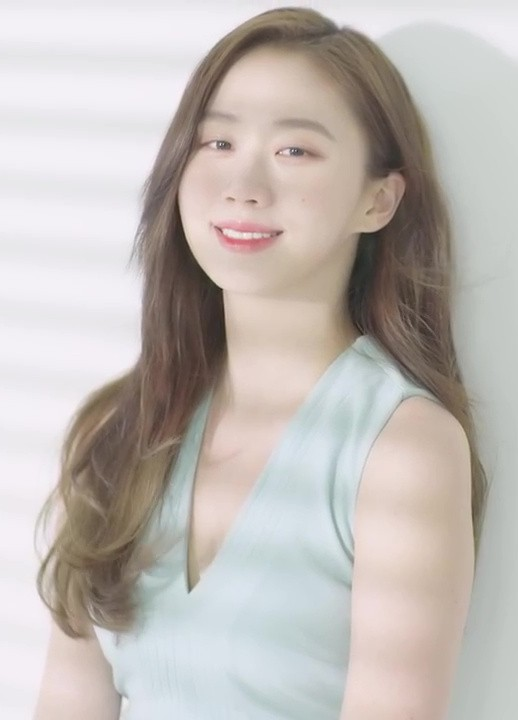
Ko in May 2018

On October 17, 2022, Ko's agency announced that Ko will marry a non-celebrity boyfriend in November. They married in a private ceremony on November 20, 2022, in Seoul. On April 30, 2025, MSteam Entertainment announced that Ko gave birth to a daughter last year.

== Filmography ==
=== Film ===
Year	Title	Role	Notes	Ref.
2010	A Good Night's Sleep for the Bad	Female high school student		
2013	An Ethics Lesson	Jin-ah		
2013	Fasten Your Seatbelt	Minamito		
2019	Trade Your Love	Park Hae-joo		
2021	A Year-End Medley	Young-ju	TVING Film	

=== Television series ===
Year	Title	Role	Notes	Ref.
2013	Miss Korea	Kim Jae-hee		
2014	Diary of a Night Watchman	Do-ha		
2015	SPY	Lee Yoon-jin		
2015	My Beautiful Bride	Yoon Joo-young		
2016	Don't Dare to Dream	Hong Soo-young	cameo	
2017	While You Were Sleeping	Shin Hee-min		
2018	Mother	Shin Ja-young		
2018	Suits	Kim Ji-na		
2018	Ms. Ma, Nemesis	Seo Eun-ji		
2020	Kingmaker: The Change of Destiny	Hwang Bong Ryun		
2022	Gaus Electronics	Cha Na-rae		

=== Web series ===
Year	Title	Role	Ref.
2020	My Holo Love	Han So-yeon	

=== Television show ===
Year	Title	Role	Notes	Ref.
2009	Style Studio	Host	Season 1	

== Awards and nominations ==
Name of the award ceremony, year presented, category, nominee of the award, and the result of the nomination
Award ceremony	Year	Category	Nominee / Work	Result	Ref.
APAN Star Awards	2018	Best Supporting Actress	Mother	Nominated	
KBS Drama Awards	2018	Best Supporting Actress	Suits	Nominated	
Korea Drama Awards	2014	Best New Actress	Miss Korea	Nominated	
MBC Drama Awards	2014	Best New Actress	Miss Korea, Diary of a Night Watchman	Won	
SBS Drama Awards	2017	Excellence Award, Actress in a Wednesday–Thursday Drama	While You Were Sleeping	Nominated	
SBS Drama Awards	2018	Best Supporting Actress	Ms. Ma, Nemesis	Nominated	
The Seoul Awards	2018	Best Supporting Actress (Drama)	Mother, Suits	Nominated	
