= Lee Sung-min (actor) =

South Korean actor (born 1968)

- Lee in 2020
- Born: December 4, 1968 (age 57); Bonghwa County, North Gyeongsang Province, South Korea
- Education: Daegu Science University
- Occupation: Actor
- Years active: 1992–present
- Agent: Hodoo Entertainment
- Height: 175 cm (5 ft 9 in)
- Spouse: Unknown (m. 1999)
- Children: 1

Korean name
- Hangul: 이성민
- RR: I Seongmin
- MR: I Sŏngmin

Lee Sung-min (Korean: 이성민; born December 4, 1968) is a South Korean actor. He first gained recognition for his supporting roles in television and film. He is best known for his performances in the series Golden Time (2012), Misaeng: Incomplete Life (2014), and Reborn Rich (2022), winning Best Actor at the Baeksang Arts Awards for the latter two works.

Lee has also received critical acclaim for his role in the espionage film The Spy Gone North (2018), for which he won several Best Actor awards. His other notable films include The Sheriff in Town (2017), The Witness (2018), The Man Standing Next (2020), and Handsome Guys (2024).

== Early life ==
Lee Sung-min was born on October 15, 1968, in Dochon, a small village located between Bonghwa and Yeongju in North Gyeongsang Province. During his early years, his family frequently moved across the country, including Seoul and Gangwon, due to his father's relocations. He eventually returned to his hometown of Bonghwa in the fourth grade of elementary school, where he completed his middle and high school education. Afterward, he left Bonghwa again to pursue higher education at Daegu Science University.

Reflecting on his past, Lee credits his father for paving the way for his acting journey. His father, enjoyed watching movies with his son. Despite Bonghwa lacking movie theaters at the time, they frequently visited the two cinemas in nearby Yeongju. As valued customers, they would eagerly rush to see new releases. Lee recalls, "I still vividly recall the movies like King Kong and Bruce Lee that I watched with my father during my childhood." Lee further shared the significant impact of these early experiences: "When I was young, my father always ensured that I watched 'masterpiece films' on weekends. Thanks to him, I had the opportunity to experience cultural elements that were challenging for a rural child to access at such a young age. Perhaps, by absorbing movies through my father from an early stage, it enabled me to pursue an acting career and consistently engage in emotive performances."

== Career ==
=== 1987–2002: Career beginnings in Daegu as theater actor ===
He began his theater journey by becoming a part of the theater company Audience and Stage (객석과 무대) in Daegu. During this period, he had the opportunity to collaborate with esteemed colleagues, including directors Choi Joo-hwan and Jeong Cheol-won, both of whom had previously held positions as directors at the Daegu Municipal Theater Company. Reflecting on those days, Lee remarked, "Each troupe at the time pursued distinct directions, identities, and showcased different works."

While actively engaging in theater activities in Daegu, he swiftly gained recognition for his talent. Whenever he participated in various theater festivals, he effortlessly swept away awards. At the age of 24, he received the New Actor Award at the Daegu Theater Festival, an honor that can only be bestowed once in a lifetime. Additionally, he achieved the highest honor among actors in the Daegu region by winning the Daegu Theater Festival Best Actor Awards.

Lee crossed paths with his future wife in the play B Unso. She was the choreographer for the play. Their encounter marked a turning point in his life, as Lee went on to achieve remarkable milestones. In 2001, Lee joined the play produced by theater group Yeoninmudae (연인무대의) titled Pig Hunt. The play received the top prize (Presidential Award) at the 19th National Theater Festival, jointly organized by the Korea Arts and Culture Promotion Agency (Director Kim Jeong-ok) and the Korean Theater Association (Chairman Choi Jong-won). As a result, Pig Hunt received a prize of 20 million won and invited to the Seoul Performing Arts Festival held in October. The director of this work, Han Jeon-gi, and the lead actor, Lee Sung-min, received the Best Director Award and the Best Acting Award, respectively.

=== 2002–2012: Seoul transition and expanding roles ===
In 2002, despite being in his mid-thirties, Lee made a tough decision to leave his wife and daughter in Daegu and venture alone to Seoul. Determined to pursue a career as an actor, he yearned to test and validate his skills in Daehangno, the heart of the Korean theater industry. Encouragement from those around him further pushed him to embark on the journey to Seoul. At that time, Lee made a promise to his family, saying, "I will give it a try for three years, and if things don't work out, I will return."

However, Lee faced financial hardships in Seoul. To make ends meet, he would make a weekly trip back to Daegu and rely on a modest allowance of 100,000 won provided by his wife. After deducting expenses for transportation, card charges, and cigarettes, there was barely anything left. In order to save on transportation costs, Lee would undertake a two-hour walk from Dongdaegu Station to his home in Shijidong. He carried taxi and chauffeur service phone numbers in his pocket, always prepared to quickly earn money in case of unemployment.

In Daehangno, Lee joined theater group Chaimu. As a member of the theater group Chaimu, Lee appeared in plays such as B Unso, Pig Hunt!, and There?. In 2003, Pig Hunt, a satirical play, was performed from 19 to 26 October at the small theater of the Dongsoong Art Center.

He also ventured into the film industry. He started with minor roles, and in 2004, he made an appearance as Loan Shark Gangster 1 in the film Father And Son: The Story Of Mencius, which led to a growing recognition of his talent in supporting roles. During his time working on the film in 2004, alongside Son Hyun-joo, he was recommended for a role in a television drama. Actor Ahn Jae-wook, who was the lead in the drama Oh Feel Young, even adjusted his schedule to accommodate Lee Sung-min's theater commitments.

The promised three years with his family swiftly passed, yet Lee had not been able to shake off his unknown status. After much contemplation, he made the bold decision to remain in Seoul, determined to set a precedent and prove that actors hailing from provincial backgrounds like himself could achieve nationwide recognition for their acting prowess. With the unwavering support of his family, they too relocated to Seoul. However, despite their collective efforts, financial hardships persisted. Lee vividly recalls how, during that time, he could only afford to buy cheap pork belly priced at around 1,000 won, which left his daughter disappointed. These challenging memories from the past continue to resonate with him to this day.

=== 2013–2016: Major breakthroughs onscreen ===
Lee made appearances in several films, including Marathon in 2005, but a considerable portion of his scenes were edited out. Although a considerable portion of his scenes were edited out. In 2006, he portrayed Seong-cheol, a humane gangster, in the low-budget film Silk Shoes, collaboratively produced by actors from the theater group Chaimu. While the film garnered attention in the industry, it did not achieve widespread public recognition. Lee subsequently made a breakthrough as a supporting actor in various films and dramas, including portraying characters such as Choi Man-ri, a scholar in The King's Letters, a pop columnist in Go Go 70s, and a chief prosecutor in The Unjust.

Lee was personally recommended by Song Kang-ho for an audition for director Park Chan-wook's film Thirst. However, during the audition, when asked if he was close to Song Kang-ho, Lee honestly replied, "We're not close." As a result, Lee didn't pass the audition. Later, when Song Kang-ho asked him, "Why didn't you say we were close?" Lee reportedly responded, "To be honest, we weren't really close."

In 2010, Lee gained significant attention for his portrayal of restaurant manager Seol Joon-seok in the MBC drama Pasta. Despite the character's unlikeable traits, Lee's performance as a villain who was hard to hate. He continued to appear in dramas such as Gloria, Listen to My Heart, films A Little Pond, and play The Story of Nulgeun the Thief.

In 2011, Lee played the ambitious Dr. Go Jae-hak in the KBS 2TV drama Brain. Followed by the MBC drama My Princess, where he portrayed President Lee Young-chan, who pretended to be just and righteous while focusing on his own interests. Lee, who had often portrayed unlikeable villain roles, successfully underwent an image transformation in the 2012 MBC drama The King 2 Hearts. He received praise for his portrayal of Lee Jae-kang, the older brother of the protagonist (Lee Seung-gi) and the former Crown Prince. A few months later, Lee took on the role of trauma specialist Choi In-hyuk in the MBC drama Golden Time. His role was widely considered highly significant to the drama. Lee reportedly lost 7 kilograms to differentiate his portrayal from his previous doctor role in Brain, and an anecdote notes he used worn-out sneakers during filming to capture the essence of an emergency room doctor. Following the drama, Lee was widely recognized by the public as a lead actor.

=== 2013–present: Recognition and further acclaim ===
In the movie The Attorney, released at the end of 2013, Lee played the role of Lee Yoon-taek, a high school classmate of the protagonist Song Woo-seok, who is a lawyer (played by Song Kang-ho) and a journalist for a social department at a newspaper in the Busan area. Although it was a supporting role, he had a considerable presence. In the MBC drama Miss Korea, which aired around the same time, he portrayed Jung Sun-saeng, a former gangster who is chased by debt from Kim Hyung-jun (played by Lee Sun-kyun), the CEO of a cosmetics company.

Lee's career marked a turning point with his appearance in the 2014 tvN drama tvN drama Misaeng: Incomplete Life. Directed by Kim Won-seok and written by Jung Yoon-jung, this 20-episode series adapted Yoon Tae-ho's webtoon series of the same title. The drama's title, derived from Go terminology, signifies "an incomplete life," reflecting the essence of not yet being fully alive. Misaeng made history as the first Korean drama to be filmed on location in Jordan, with Lee and Yim Si-wan shooting the series's prologue in Amman, Petra, and Wadi Rum. The series became a cultural phenomenon, achieving remarkable viewership ratings for a cable network program in South Korea. Lee received accolades for his portrayal of working professional Oh Sang-sik, earning him Best Actor awards at the 52nd Baeksang Arts Awards and the 2016 tvN10 Awards.

In early 2016, Lee debuted as the lead character in the film Sori: Voice from the Heart portraying Hae-kwan. The film follows Hae-kwan's desperate search for his daughter, lost in Daegu in 2003, which leads him to an AI satellite robot with global sound memory. Aided by the robot, he tracks his daughter's voice, and they form an unforgettable bond. Jeon Hye-jin, also a Chaimu member, played Hae-kwan's wife. Lee's performance drew praise from Elizabeth Kerr of The Hollywood Reporter, who stated: "Sori is at its strongest when it focuses on Hae-kwan and the surprising onion-layer style discoveries he makes about the daughter he was sure he knew (played by Chae Soo-bin in flashback). Lee balances regret and disbelief effortlessly, and makes the man's sadness real without tipping into histrionics."

Two years later, Lee made his first appearance on the red carpet at the Cannes Film Festival with the movie The Spy Gone North (2018). His acting received critical acclaim and earned him multiple awards, including Best Actor at the Buil Film Awards, Grand Bell Awards, Korean Film Critics Association Awards, and Director's Cut Awards. His accolades continued in 2019 when he won the Best Actor award in the film category at the 55th Baeksang Arts Awards.

In 2020, Lee had two films released on the same day, January 22. These included the action comedy Mr. Zoo: The Missing VIP, and the historical political thriller The Man Standing Next. His performance in the film The Man Standing Next again garnered praise. Portraying former President Park Chung-hee, Lee's portrayal addressed initial skepticism, as he incorporated a distinct Gyeongsang dialect and delivered a notable performance.

In his next project, his portrayal of Kang Won-jun in the Juvenile Justice (released in early 2022) showcased his versatility. His depiction of a complex character, conflicted by his harshness towards his family and guilt towards his son while investigating his own potential downfall, garnered acclaim. At the end of 2022, Lee's performance as Jin Yang-chul in Reborn Rich received praise. He was widely noted for his portrayal of a first-generation chaebol dedicated to maintaining his company position. Critics highlighted his use of the Gyeongsang dialect and a raspy voice adapted for the character. His performance and the character's subsequent departure were frequently discussed among viewers and critics regarding the shift in the drama's focus. In 2023, he received the Best Actor award in the TV category at the 59th Baeksang Arts Awards.

== Personal life ==
Lee's wife was a contemporary dance major who also served as the director overseeing the choreography for one of his performances in Daegu. Initially, Lee didn't have a favorable impression of her because she came across as strict and serious. However, after the show, Lee began receiving frequent phone calls and mistakenly believed they were regarding the choreography fee. With no money to spare, he attempted to at least share a meal, but to his surprise, his future wife took the initiative and contacted him first, asking if it would be all right to go out together. This marked the beginning of their dating journey. Eventually, they got married with a modest cost of only 2 million won. Shortly after tying the knot, they had a daughter, and Lee had to shoulder the responsibility of supporting their livelihood solely through his income.

== Filmography ==
Key
†	Denotes films that have not yet been released

=== Film ===
Year	Title	Role	Notes	Ref.
2001	Black & White	Thief 1	Independent film	
2004	Father and Son: The Story of Mencius	Loan shark 1	Bit part	
2004	My Mother, the Mermaid	Fruit store owner	Bit part	
2004	Flying Boys	Mr. Kim	Bit part	
2005	Marathon	Jung-wook's friend	Bit part	
2005	Boy Goes to Heaven	Detective	Bit part	
2006	Silk Shoes	Sung-cheol		
2006	Seducing Mr. Perfect	Director Yang		
2007	Secret Sunshine	Chef	Bit part	
2007	Wide Awake	Sang-woo's father		
2008	The Good, the Bad, the Weird	Cook	Bit part	
2008	Go Go 70s	Lee Byung-wook		
2009	The Pot	Dong-shik		
2009	Triangle	President Lee Byeong-joon		
2010	A Little Pond	Kkoo-ri's father		
2010	Bestseller	Editor Ma Dae-yoon		
2010	Troubleshooter	Yoon Dae-hee		
2010	The Unjust	District Attorney		
2010	Cafe Noir	Mi-yeon 1's husband		
2010	休(휴)	Mr. Kim	Short film	
2011	Officer of the Year	Detective Jo		
2011	The Cat	Bi-dan's papa	Cameo	
2011	Dreaming of Romance	Seung-hwan	Short film	
2012	Howling	Gu Young-cheol		
2012	Eighteen and Nineteen	OB/Gyn doctor	Cameo	
2012	All About My Wife	Director Na	Cameo	
2013	My Little Hero	Kang Hee-seok		
2013	The Attorney	Lee Yoon-taek		
2014	Venus Talk	Lee Jae-ho		
2014	Broken	Jang Eok-gwan		
2014	Kundo: Age of the Rampant	Dae-ho		
2014	My Brilliant Life	Family doctor	Cameo	
2014	Big Match	Choi Young-ho		
2015	The Piper	Village chief		
2015	Sori: Voice From the Heart	Hae-gwan		
2016	A Violent Prosecutor	Woo Jong-gil		
2016	Familyhood	Joo Min-ho	Cameo	
2017	The Sheriff in Town	Dae-ho		
2017	Real	Choi Jin-gi		
2018	What a Man Wants	Seok-geun		
2018	The Spy Gone North	Ri Myung-woon		
2018	The Witness	Sang-hoon		
2018	The Drug King	Seo Sang-hoon	Cameo	
2019	Hit-and-Run Squad	Min-jae's adoptive father	Cameo	
2019	The Beast	Jeong Han-soo		
2019	Black Money	Choi Yong-wook	Cameo	
2020	Mr. Zoo: The Missing VIP	Tae-ju		
2020	The Man Standing Next	President Park		
2021	The 8th Night	Park Jin-soo		
2021	Miracle: Letters to the President	Tae-yoon		
2022	Hunt	Jo Won-sik	Cameo	
2022	Remember	Pil-Joo		
2023	The Devil's Deal	Kwon Soon-tae		
2023	The Moon	Hwang Kyu-tae	Cameo	
2023	12.12: The Day	Jeong Sang-ho		
2024	Handsome Guys	Kang Jae-pil		
2025	No Other Choice	Koo Beom-mo		
2025	Boss	Im Dae-soo	Special appearance	

=== Television series ===
Year	Title	Role	Notes	Ref.
2004	Oh Feel Young	Inspector Park		
2004	MBC Best Theater "Brother Is Back"	Il-do		
2005	MBC Best Theater "Loveholic Project"	Manager Kim		
2006	Hello God	Detective	Cameo (episode 1–2)	
2006	Special Crime Investigation: Murder in the Blue House	Ha Doo-gil	Cameo (episode 2–3)	
2007	Lucifer	Hwang Dae-pil		
2007	Legend of Hyang Dan	Byun Hak-do		
2007	Drama City "Catch the Water Vein"	Director		
2008	The Great King, Sejong	Choi Man-ri		
2008	On Air	PD Song Soo-chul		
2008	Working Mom	Kang Chul-min		
2008	Terroir	Multi-level staff member	Cameo (episode 3, 8)	
2009	Can Anyone Love	Heo Se-dol		
2009	Partner	Han Joon-soo	Cameo (episode 13)	
2009	Triple	Director Jung		
2009	Hometown Legends "Silent Village"	Jinsa Yoon		
2009	Hot Blood	Yang Man-cheol		
2010	Pasta	Seol Joon-seok		
2010	Gloria	Son Jong-bum		
2010	KBS Drama Special "Last Flashman"	Jo Won-shik		
2010	MBC Best Theater "We Teach Love"	Park Yong-dae		
2011	My Princess	Lee Young-chan		
2011	Listen to My Heart	Lee Myung-gyun		
2011	KBS Drama Special "Identical Criminals"	Kang Dae-woo		
2011	A Thousand Days' Promise	Seo-yeon's boss	Cameo (episode 1)	
2011	Brain	Go Jae-hak		
2012	Just an Ordinary Love Story	Kim Joo-pyeong	Drama Special Series	
2012	The King 2 Hearts	King Lee Jae-kang		
2012	Golden Time	Choi In-hyuk		
2012	Arang and the Magistrate	Gatekeeper	Cameo (episode 20)	
2012	KBS Drama Special "Culprit Among Friends"	Detective Park	Cameo	
2013	When a Man Falls in Love	Gangster boss Kim Dae-kwang	Cameo (episode 1–2, 4)	
2013	Monstar	Movie director Kwon Tae-hyun	Cameo (episode 1)	
2013	Miss Korea	Teacher Jung		
2014	Big Man	High-ranking executive	Cameo	
2014	Misaeng: Incomplete Life	Oh Sang-shik		
2015	Hogu's Love	Chief Oh	Cameo (episode 1)	
2015	Splendid Politics	Yi Deok-hyeong		
2016	Memory	Park Tae-Suk		
2016	Entourage	Himself	Cameo (episode 16)	
2020	Money Game	Heo Jae		
2020	Soul Mechanic	Doctor	Cameo (episode 3)	
2022	Juvenile Justice	Kang Won-joong		
2022	Narco-Saints	Fishing boat captain	Voice cameo	
2022	Shadow Detective	Kim Taek-rok	Season 1–2	
2022	Reborn Rich	Jin Yang-cheol		
2023	A Bloody Lucky Day	Oh Taek		
2024	The Tyrant	Ja-gyeong's adoptive father	Cameo (episode 4)	
2025	The Queen Who Crowns	Lee Seong Gye	Special appearance	
2025	Nine Puzzles	Do Yoon-su	Cameo	
2026	Teach You a Lesson	Choi Gang-seok		
TBA	I am Home †			

== Theater ==
=== Musicals ===
Year	Title		Role	Venue	Date	Notes/Ref.
Year	English	Korean	Role	Venue	Date	Notes/Ref.
2003	Fairy Tale Laundry	동화세탁소	—N/a	Daegu Culture and Arts Center Grand Theater	May 10–11	
2004	Fairy Tale Laundry	동화세탁소	—N/a	Daegu Culture and Arts Center Grand Theater	April 16–17	assistant director
2004	Fairy Tale Laundry	동화세탁소	—N/a	Daegu Culture and Arts Center Grand Theater	November 19–20	

=== Plays ===
Year	Title		Role	Venue	Date	Notes/Ref.
Year	English	Korean	Role	Venue	Date	Notes/Ref.
2001	Pig Hunt	돼지사냥	Bang, Chairman Gu	Dongsoong Art Center Small Theater	Oct 4–26	
2002	Oxygen	산소	—N/a	Grand Theater of the Pohang Culture and Arts Center	August 10–12	stage manager
2003	There	거기	Lee Chun-bal	Dongsoong Art Center Small Theater	Jan 7 to Feb 23	
2003	Pig Hunt	돼지사냥	Bang, Chairman Gu	Dongsoong Art Center Small Theater	Sep 19 to Oct 26	
2003	Bieonso	비언소	Strange man	Dongsoong Art Center Small Theater	Nov 4 to Dec 28	
2004	The Story of the Thief	양덕원 이야기	Kwan-woo	Arts Theater of The Korea Culture and Arts Promotion Agency	February 25 to March 14	
2005	Korea Fantasy	마르고 닳도록		Seoul Arts Center Jayu Small Theater	December 1 to 17	
2006	There	거기	Lee Chun-bal	JTN Art Hall 2	May 3 to June 25, 2006	
2006	Shear Madness	쉬어 매드니스	Chief Na Do-sik; Detective Ma	Daehakro Arts Center Hall 2	Nov 11	
2007	Shining City	샤이닝 시티	Ian	Hanyang Repertory Theater	Mar 1 to Apr 8	
2007	Byun - A Grotesque Comedy	변 - A Grotesque Comedy	Byeon Sang-do	Arko Arts Theater Small Theater	Aug 31 to Sep 14	
2010	Bieonso	B언소(蜚言所)	Strange man	Daehangno Art One Theater Hall 3 Chaimu Theater	Feb 5 to May 2	
2010	The Story of the Thief	양덕원 이야기	Kwan-woo	Daehangno Art One Theater Hall 3 Chaimu Theater	May 7 to Jul 4	
2011	The Story of the Thief	늘근도둑 이야기	Kwan-woo	Yes24 Art One Hall 3	February 11, 2011 to	
2011	The Story of the Thief	늘근도둑 이야기	Kwan-woo	Bupyeong Arts Center Haenuri Theater, Bupyeong	May 13 to May 14, 2011	
2011	The Story of the Thief	늘근도둑 이야기	Kwan-woo	Incheon Seogu Cultural Center, Incheon	Oct 21 to Oct 22, 2011	
2011	The Story of the Thief	늘근도둑 이야기	Kwan-woo	Copygol Cultural Center, Bucheon	Nov 18 to Nov 19, 2011	
2011	The Story of the Thief	늘근도둑 이야기	Kwan-woo	Goyang Aram Nuri Sarasae Theater, Goyang	Nov 22 to Nov 27, 2011	
2012	Seoul Notes	서울노트		Daehak-ro Information Small Theatre	February 2–12	
2012–2013	There	거기	Lee Chun-bal	Art One Theater 3	Sep 7–Feb 24	
2013	There	거기	Lee Chun-bal	MBC Lotte Art Hall	March 30–31	
2014	Korea Fantasy	마르고 닳도록		Sarasae Theater in Aram Nuri, Goyang	April 10–12	
2016	Twenty Twenty Chaimu - Tail Cotton Story	스물스물 차이무 - 꼬리솜 이야기	Ma Gap-ji	Art Plaza 2	November 6 to 29	

== Accolades ==
=== Awards and nominations ===
Name of the award ceremony, year presented, category, nominee of the award, and the result of the nomination
Award ceremony	Year	Category	Nominee / Work	Result	Ref.
APAN Star Awards	2012 (Note: The inaugural ceremony K-Drama Star Awards was renamed to APAN Star Awards in 2013.)	Acting Award, Actor	Golden Time	Won	
APAN Star Awards	2015	Top Excellence Award, Actor in a Miniseries	Misaeng: Incomplete Life	Won	
APAN Star Awards	2023	Top Excellence Award, Actor in a Miniseries	Reborn Rich, Shadow Detective	Nominated	
Baeksang Arts Awards	2013	Best Actor – Television	Golden Time	Nominated	
Baeksang Arts Awards	2015	Best Actor – Television	Misaeng: Incomplete Life	Won	
Baeksang Arts Awards	2019	Best Actor – Film	The Spy Gone North	Won	
Baeksang Arts Awards	2023	Best Actor – Television	Reborn Rich	Won	
Baeksang Arts Awards	2026	Best Supporting Actor – Film	No Other Choice	Won	
Blue Dragon Film Awards	2014	Best Supporting Actor	Kundo: Age of the Rampant	Nominated	
Blue Dragon Film Awards	2018	Best Actor	The Spy Gone North	Nominated	
Blue Dragon Film Awards	2021	Best Supporting Actor	The Man Standing Next	Nominated	
Blue Dragon Film Awards	2021	Best Supporting Actor	Miracle: Letters to the President	Nominated	
Blue Dragon Film Awards	2024	Best Actor	Handsome Guys	Nominated	
Blue Dragon Film Awards	2025	Best Supporting Actor	No Other Choice	Won	
Blue Dragon Series Awards	2023	Best Actor	Shadow Detective	Nominated	
Brand Customer Loyalty Awards (Note: Brand Customer Loyalty Awards is annual event which selects and awards the most influential brands in society and popular culture, determined through national consumer surveys. It is organized by the Korea Consumer Forum and Brand Keys, a top 10 American brand consulting organization.)	2026	Actor – Scene Stealer	Lee Sung-min	Won	
Buil Film Awards	2015	Best Supporting Actor	The Piper	Nominated	
Buil Film Awards	2018	Best Actor	The Spy Gone North	Won	
Buil Film Awards	2026	Best Supporting Actor	No Other Choice	Nominated	
Chunsa Film Art Awards	2019	Best Actor	The Spy Gone North	Nominated	
Chunsa Film Art Awards	2020	Best Supporting Actor	The Man Standing Next	Won	
Chunsa Film Art Awards	2025	Special Jury Prize	No Other Choice	Won	
Daegu Theatre Festival	1992	Best New Actor	Lee Sung-min	Won	
Daegu Theatre Festival	1998	Best Actor	Lee Sung-min	Won	
Director's Cut Awards	2018	Best Actor – Film	The Spy Gone North	Won	
Director's Cut Awards	2022	Best Actor – Film	The Man Standing Next	Nominated	
Golden Ticket Awards	2012	Best Actor in a Play	The Weir	Won	
Grand Bell Awards	2018	Best Actor	The Spy Gone North	Won	
Grand Bell Awards	2023	Best Actor in a Series	Shadow Detective	Nominated	
Grimae Awards	2012	Best Actor	Golden Time	Won	
KOFRA Film Awards	2019	Best Actor	The Spy Gone North	Won	
Korea Drama Awards	2012	Excellence Award, Actor	Golden Time	Nominated	
Korea Drama Awards	2023	Grand Prize (Daesang)	Shadow Detective 2	Won	
Korea Theatre Festival	2001	Best Actor	Pig Hunting	Won	
Korean Association of Film Critics Awards	2018	Best Actor	The Spy Gone North	Won	
MBC Drama Awards	2012	PD Award	Golden Time, The King 2 Hearts	Won	
MBC Drama Awards	2012	Excellence Award, Actor in a Miniseries	Golden Time, The King 2 Hearts	Nominated	
The Seoul Awards	2018	Best Actor	The Spy Gone North	Nominated	
Seoul International Drama Awards	2023	Outstanding Korean Actor	Reborn Rich	Won	
tvN10 Awards	2016	Best Actor	Misaeng: Incomplete Life	Won	

=== State honors ===
Name of country, year given, and name of honor
Country	Year	Honor or Award	Ref.
South Korea (Note: Honors are given at the Korean Popular Culture and Arts Awards, arranged by the Korea Creative Content Agency and hosted by the Ministry of Culture, Sports and Tourism. They are awarded to those who have contributed to the arts and South Korea's pop culture.)	2022	Prime Minister's Commendation	

=== Listicles ===
Name of publisher, year listed, name of listicle, and placement
Publisher	Year	Listicle	Placement	Ref.
Forbes	2015	Korea Power Celebrity 40	39th	
Korean Film Council	2021	Korean Actors 200 (Note: Introduces 200 actors that best represent the present and future of Korean cinema to the people in the film industry all over the world.)	Included	
