= My Princess (TV series) =

South Korean romantic comedy television series

- Promotional poster for My Princess
- Genre: Romance; Comedy; Drama
- Written by: Jang Young-shil
- Directed by: Kwon Seok-jang
- Starring: Song Seung-heon; Kim Tae-hee; Park Ye-jin; Ryu Soo-young
- Country of origin: South Korea
- Original language: Korean
- No. of episodes: 16

Production
- Running time: 70 minutes
- Production companies: Curtain Call Production Inc.; Storm S Productions

Original release
- Network: Munhwa Broadcasting Corporation
- Release: January 5 – February 24, 2011

My Princess (Korean: 마이 프린세스) is a 2011 South Korean romantic comedy television series, starring Song Seung-heon, Kim Tae-hee, Park Ye-jin, and Ryu Soo-young. It aired on MBC from January 5 to February 24, 2011 on Wednesdays and Thursdays at 21:55 for 16 episodes.

== Synopsis ==
An ordinary and gorgeous college student, Lee Seol (Kim Tae-hee), finds out that she is a princess and the great-granddaughter of the Joseon Dynasty's last Emperor, Emperor Sunjong. The grandson of the chairman of Daehan Group, Park Hae-young (Song Seung-heon), is put in charge of educating Seol on proper etiquette in order for her to fulfill her role. However, Hae-young is put in a precarious situation when he finds himself drawn to Seol, the girl who will take away his inheritance if the monarchy is restored.

== Cast ==
=== Main ===
- Song Seung-heon as Park Hae-young
  - Choi Won-hong as young Hae-young
- Kim Tae-hee as Lee Seol
  - Jeon Min-seo as young Seol
- Park Ye-jin as Oh Yoon-joo
- Ryu Soo-young as Nam Jung-woo

=== Supporting ===
- Lee Soon-jae as Park Dong-jae, Hae-young's grandfather and chairman of the Daehan Group
- Maeng Sang-hoon as Oh Ki-taek, Yoon-joo's father and Park Dong-jae's secretary
- Kang Ye-sol as Lee Dan, Seol's adoptive sister
- Im Ye-jin as Kim Da-bok, Seol's adoptive mother
- Lee Gi-kwang as Geon-yi, royal chef
- Son Seong-yoon as Shin Mi-so, palace maid
- Hwang Young-hee as Hong In-ae, chief palace maid
- Lee Sung-min as Lee Young-chan, President of the Republic of Korea
- Lee Dae-yeon as So Sun-woo
- Choi Yu-hwa as Kang Sun-ah, Seol's friend from school
- Baek Bong-ki as Bong-jae, bodyguard
- Heo Tae-hee as aide
- Chu Hun-yub as Yoo Ki-kwang, reporter
- Min Joon-hyun as reporter
- Park Hyuk-kwon as Lee Han, Seol's father
- Park Jung-woo as Park Hae-young's father
- Ahn Nae-sang as Emperor Sunjong (cameo)
- Jo Sung-ha as Park Dong-jae's father (cameo)
- Cha Hwa-yeon as fashion designer (cameo)
- Jung Suk-yong as priest (cameo, episode 4)
- Joo Sang-wook as Hyun-woo (cameo, episode 9)
- Park Min-woo

== Soundtrack ==
My Princess Original Soundtrack

Soundtrack album
- Released: January 13, 2011; February 15, 2011
- Genre: Soundtrack
- Label: Pony Canyon Korea, Inc.

The My Princess original soundtrack was released as two 7-track albums by Pony Canyon Korea. Part 1 was released on January 13, 2011 and Part 2 on February 15, 2011. The soundtrack contained a number of songs used in the series, including those by Lee Sang-eun, Taru and Every Single Day.

Part 1
No.	Title	Artist	Length
1.	"Falling"	Lee Sang-eun	2:40
2.	"Because of You (너 때문인걸)"	Highlight	3:25
3.	"Wind Blow (바람 불어라)"	Ga-yoon (4minute)	4:14
4.	"Sunset (노을)"	Every Single Day	3:49
5.	"Change"	Every Single Day	2:37
6.	"Kasio"	Taru	4:04
7.	"The Last Song (마지막 노래)"	Lucite Tokki	4:04

Part 2
No.	Title	Artist	Length
1.	"Cherish That Person (그 사람을 아껴요)"	Yoseob (Beast)	3:56
2.	"Bears (곰인형)"	Okdal	3:44
3.	"Oasis (오아시스)"	Jeon Ji-yoon (4Minute)	2:48
4.	"U.F.O"	Ok Yohan (Pia)	3:18
5.	"Young Princess"	Carl Kanowsky, 문성남 (Moon Changmin)	2:46
6.	"Heart (마음)"	Every Single Day	2:53
7.	"Falling (Original Ver.)"	Every Single Day	2:42

== Ratings ==
Date	Episode	Nationwide	Seoul
2011-01-05	1	13.0% (5th)	18.1% (5th)
2011-01-06	2	14.3% (5th)	17.2% (5th)
2011-01-12	3	16.2% (3rd)	20.0% (3rd)
2011-01-13	4	17.0% (3rd)	22.7% (2nd)
2011-01-19	5	16.9% (3rd)	21.9% (2nd)
2011-01-20	6	14.0% (3rd)	18.4% (3rd)
2011-01-26	7	14.1% (4th)	18.2% (4th)
2011-01-27	8	14.5% (4th)	18.0% (3rd)
2011-02-02	9	9.9% (7th)	11.8% (5th)
2011-02-03	10	8.4% (13th)	10.1% (9th)
2011-02-09	11	12.0% (5th)	14.7% (5th)
2011-02-10	12	12.4% (6th)	15.8% (4th)
2011-02-16	13	12.6% (5th)	15.5% (5th)
2011-02-17	14	12.3% (5th)	15.5% (4th)
2011-02-23	15	12.0% (6th)	15.6% (5th)
2011-02-24	16	12.3% (5th)	15.4% (3rd)
Average		13.2%	16.7%

== Awards and nominations ==
Year	Award	Category	Recipient	Result
2011	6th Seoul International Drama Awards	Outstanding Korean Actor	Song Seung-heon	Nominated
2011	6th Seoul International Drama Awards	Outstanding Korean Actress	Kim Tae-hee	Nominated
2011	MBC Drama Awards	Top Excellence Award, Actor in a Miniseries	Song Seung-heon	Nominated
2011	MBC Drama Awards	Top Excellence Award, Actress in a Miniseries	Kim Tae-hee	Nominated
2011	MBC Drama Awards	Best New Actor in a Miniseries	Lee Gi-kwang	Won
2011	MBC Drama Awards	Popularity Award, Actor	Song Seung-heon	Nominated
2011	MBC Drama Awards	Popularity Award, Actress	Kim Tae-hee	Nominated
2011	MBC Drama Awards	Best Couple Award	Song Seung-heon and Kim Tae-hee	Nominated
2012	7th Seoul International Drama Awards	Outstanding Korean Drama	My Princess	Nominated

== Media ==
My Princess was released in two DVD box sets in Japan. The first set containing volumes 1-4 was released on July 6, 2011 and the second with volumes 5-8 was released on August 3, 2011. Both were released under Curtain Call Production Inc., Storm S Productions and Geneon Universal Entertainment.
