= Cheongdam-dong Alice =

South Korean television series

- Promotional poster
- Also known as: Alice in Cheongdam-dong
- Genre: Romance; Melodrama; Comedy
- Based on: Cheongdam-dong Audrey by Lee Hye-kyung
- Written by: Kim Ji-woon; Kim Jin-hee
- Directed by: Jo Soo-won; Shin Seung-woo
- Starring: Moon Geun-young; Park Si-hoo; So Yi-hyun; Kim Ji-seok
- Opening theme: "Rain Shower" by Every Single Day
- Country of origin: South Korea
- Original language: Korean
- No. of episodes: 16

Production
- Executive producer: Han Jung-hwan
- Producers: Lee Sung-hoon; Joo Dong-min
- Production location: Korea
- Cinematography: Bae Hong-soo
- Editor: Kim Soo-jin
- Production companies: KP & Show

Original release
- Network: Seoul Broadcasting System
- Release: 1 December 2012 – 27 January 2013

Cheongdam-dong Alice (Korean: 청담동 앨리스) is a 2012 South Korean television series, starring Moon Geun-young, Park Si-hoo, So Yi-hyun and Kim Ji-seok. The series tells the story of a young woman's "journey" to Cheongdam-dong ― one of the wealthiest areas in Gangnam ― by seducing a second-generation chaebol into marriage. It aired on SBS from December 1, 2012, to January 27, 2013, on Saturdays and Sundays at 21:55 for 16 episodes.

== Synopsis ==
Han Se-kyung (Moon Geun-young) believed in l'effort est ma force, meaning "hard work is my strength." The aspiring fashion designer couldn't afford to study overseas, but won many local design contests and mastered French on her own.

She slowly begins to lose her positive outlook toward the world when her father's small bakery closes down after losing customers to larger retailers. Se-kyung's boyfriend of six years (Namkoong Min), who has to pay his sick mother's medical bills, runs away with her savings.

After much struggling, Se-kyung finally lands a job as a designer at GN Fashion, an apparel company in ritzy, image-conscious Cheongdam-dong (a small, insular, and particularly posh neighborhood in Seoul's Gangnam District). She is stunned to find out, however, that her actual job is being a personal assistant to the president's wife ― who turns out to be her high school classmate and rival Seo Yoon-joo (So Yi-hyun).

Her "official" boss In-hwa (Kim Yoo-ri) is the president's younger sister, at 29 only two years older than Se-kyung, who became the youngest person to be appointed to her position. "What sucks is your taste, not your resume," In-hwa bluntly tells Se-kyung. "Taste is an accumulation of what you see and think, as well as the kind of things you are exposed to, from the moment that you were born."

What she says completely shatters Se-kyung's life philosophy rooted in hard work and consistent effort. Upon this despairing realization, Se-kyung changes her life's course. Seeing how Yoon-joo's life has changed compared to her own, Se-kyung decides to do exactly the same thing — marry a rich man. She enlists Yoon-joo's help and embarks on the project to become a "Cheongdam-dong daughter in-law," a term referring to stylish young married women of the upper crust living in that wealthy neighborhood. Her bitter disillusionment leads her to seduce Jean Thierry Cha (Park Si-hoo), the youngest CEO in the luxury-brand industry. Cha, whose real name is Cha Seung-jo, harbors a petty side and is determined to get back at the people who have hurt him in the past. And despite his line of business, he feels a strong hatred towards women who marry for money and are obsessed with designer labels. Seung-jo falls for the genuine, idealistic Se-kyung, but not knowing this, she gives up on being the person she wants to be, and decides to live like those she once despised.

The title is a word play on Alice in Wonderland, referring to the heroine's fish-out-of-water status in said neighborhood, as she navigates the strange new world of designer clothes, gossip and consumerism, and learns the meaning of real love and happiness.

== Cast ==
- Moon Geun-young - Han Se-kyung

Han Se-kyung is an optimistic girl living her life with the belief that "hard work is my strength." After countless job interviews, she finally gets hired by an apparel company. But not as a designer; instead, she becomes an errand girl for the president's wife. This makes her rethink her past and makes her determined to change her future.

- Park Si-hoo - Cha Seung-jo / Jean Thierry Cha

The Korean president of Artemis, a famous luxury brand. Although he was born into a rich family, he is estranged from his father and built his company based on his own hard work. He says he will never trust women again after getting hurt by his first love Yoon-Joo; but actually, he desires true love more than anybody else.

- So Yi-hyun - Seo Yoon-joo

Ever since she was a young girl, Seo Yoon-joo had wanted to enter Cheongdam-dong. After using several methods, she finally becomes a "Cheongdam-dong daughter-in-law." She was once Han Se-kyung's rival in high school, and used to be jealous of her. She is Seung-jo's first love.

- Kim Ji-seok - Tommy Hong

A famous Korean designer, who moonlights as a matchmaker for upper crust families. At first, he schemes against Han Se-kyung for ruining his plans for an arranged marriage between Cha Seung-jo and Shin In-hwa. But later he admires her tenacity and helps her.

- Han Jin-hee - Cha Il-nam

Cha Seung-jo's father, and president of Royal Department Store. He is estranged from his son and tries to reconcile with him.

- Kim Seung-soo - Shin Min-hyuk

Seo Yoon-joo's husband and president of GN Fashion.

- Kim Yoo-ri - Shin In-hwa

Shin Min-hyuk's younger sister. She is the youngest to become the leader of the team of designers at GN Fashion, and is Han Se-kyung's boss. In-hwa has beauty, talent, a strong personality, and an excellent background, and her pride is piqued when Cha Seung-jo chooses Se-kyung over her, so she tries to undermine their relationship.

- Shin So-yul - Choi Ah-jung

Han Se-kyung's best friend.

- Park Gwang-hyun - Heo Dong-wook

Cha Seung-jo's best friend, and shrink.

- Choi Sung-joon - Secretary Moon
- Jung In-gi - Han Deuk-ki

Se-kyung's father, and a baker.

- Lee Jong-nam - Jung Yoon-hee

Se-kyung's mother.

- Shin Hye-jeong - Han Se-jin

Han Se-kyung's younger sister. She likes to be with her friends. Though she sometimes does not like to listen to adults, she has a kind and warm heart.

- Gu Won - Seo Ho-min

Seo Yoon-joo's younger brother who is extremely loyal to her.

- Jo Kwang-min as Yeon
- Seo Hye-won as Seo kim-soo
- Namkoong Min - So In-chan (guest appearance, ep 1–3)

Se-kyung's ex-boyfriend.

== Episode summary ==
Summary from episode 1 to 8

Episode 1

Cha Seung-jo, French name Jean Thierry Cha, is the youngest Korean president of a famous luxury brand called Artemis. He believes that women go after luxury brands because of their high prices. His strategy for management is to raise the price of products to achieve increased sales.

Han Se-kyung is a person who tries her best in getting everything and lives by the motto of "Self-achievement generated from hard working". Though she studies design, because of her family's financial problem, she doesn't have the opportunity to study design abroad. And for this reason, not having any abroad studying experiences, she is often rejected by job interviewers. After three years, surprisingly, she is offered a job as a temporary worker at a clothes designing company called GN Fashion. She doesn't become a designer in the company; she becomes an errand girl for the head lady. When she is delivering some bags once, she bumps into Cha Seung-jo's car. Cha seung-jo sees a full car of luxury brands and therefore insults HanSe-kyung as a "material girl". He hides his identity as the president of Artemis and introduces himself as the secretary of the president of Artemis.

Cha Seung-jo goes to see his father, president Cha ll-nam of Royal Company, and in a disdainful tone, tells him that Artemis will not be a shop in the Royal Company's shopping center. Seeing his son treats him poorly, Cha ll-nam leaves angrily.

On the other hand, Han Se-kyung's boyfriend wants to break up with her because he thinks he cannot let Han Se-kyung stay with him in poverty. He gives her a famous brand's bag as their break up present.

At the home of Cha Seung-jo, he shares his recording on the conversation between him and his father previously with his friend/psychological doctor. He takes out a picture of his ex-girlfriend, Seo Yoon-joo, remembering the time in France where he gives up his wealth and family in order to marry her secretly, but she breaks up with him instead because he isn't wealthy anymore. He decides to collaborate with GN Fashion, which is Seo Yoon-joo's husband's company. Seo Yoon-joo, aware of the collaboration, asks his husband, Shin Min-hyuk, if she can be in charge of setting up the dinner between Jan Thierry Cha and him. Shin Min-hyuk agrees.

When Han Se-kyung is delivering a set of pearl ear rings, she loses the Certificate of Authenticity. When she goes back to the shop to look for it, she meets Cha Seung-jo, who insults her again. Returning to her company, she finds shockingly that the head lady is Seo Yoon-joo, who is her high school rival.

Episode 2

When Han Se-kyung is about to quit her job, her team leader tells her that the reason she can't become a designer is that she doesn't have the taste for fashion, leading her to reconsider her decision.

Han Se-kyung's best friend, Choi Ah-jung, helps her to find out the life of Seo Yoon-joo in order to know how to become a "Cheongdam -dong daughter-in-law". She finds out that Seo Yoon-joo actually is called Cha Yoon-joo when she has lived in France because she has married a man there. Han Se-kyung guessed from this information and the words of Shin Min-hyuk, who is the president of GN Fashion, that she is accepted specially by Seo Yoon-joo.

A customer has come to Artemis and complains that one of the bags she bought has detached spots on it. Cha Seung- jo gives her a new bag and then asks his secretary, Secretary Moon, to investigate in what has caused this problem. After investigations, they find out that Han Se-kyung's boyfriend, So In-chan, has sold uncertified bags outside the stores. After Han Se-kyung hears about this news, she immediately runs to So In-chan's house. She finds that in his mailbox, there are many collection letters from various banks. Han Se-kyung wants to get help from Artemis' president. On her way, she meets Cha Seung-jo. Not know that Cha Seung-jo is actually the president of Artemis, they have an argument again and she goes away unhappily.

Cha Seung-jo goes to Seo Yoon-joo's house because her husband has a dinner appointment with the president of Artemis. She is deliberately shocked when she sees that the president is her ex-boyfriend.

On Han Se-kyung's side, her father tells her that the family is suffering from money-shortage. They cannot open their bakery anymore and they are under much debt. Hearing this, Han Se-kyung wants to change herself. She takes the piece of information that Seo Yoon-jo has married in France and goes to threaten her. She will not tell others this news only if Seo Yoon-jo helps her to become a "Cheongdam -dong daughter-in-law".

Episode 3

Seo Yoon-jo asks her brother, Seo Ho-min, to stalk Han Se-kyung secretly. From the pictures taken by Seo Ho-min of Han Se-kyung, she sees Cha Seung-jo is in it. On the other hand, Cha Seung-jo's doctor/best friend, Heo Dong-wook, says Cha Seung-jo cannot control his emotions mentally, he can never cry. Secretary moon finds Seo In-chan's location; he is at his mom's funeral at the time. Cha Seung-jo happens to witness the scene and he orders the company not to go after So In-chan anymore. Instead, he sends flowers to the funeral house to express his sorrow for his mother. Under the warning of his father that someone is secretly taking pictures of him, he catches Seo Ho-min and warns him not ever to do it again. Cha Seung-jo also moves to the same neighborhood where Seo Yoon-joo is living.

Han Se-kyung has written a letter to the president of Artemis about she has to break up with So In-chan because of their financial situation. Along with the letter, she also puts in her check book, showing that she is willing to pay off the fee for So In-chan with all she has. As Cha Seung-jo is reading the letter, he cries for the first time in many years. He looks in the mirror and says, "You are wrong, Seo Yoon-joo, there is love in the world." He immediately tells Secretary Moon to cancel his lawsuit against So In-chan, also imagining himself encouraging Han Se-kyung and So In-chan to continue their relationship. When he is about to head out, Secretary Moon brings in gifts from Han Se-kyung. When he sees that the present to Secretary Moon is better than the one to Artemis' president, he runs out to catch up to Han Se-kyung to ask her why the President has the worse one. Han Se-kyung answers that the one to the President is hand made by her. That actually makes Cha Seung-joo very happy.

Seo Yoon-joo pays an unexpected visit to Han Se-kyung's house. Her parents welcome her dearly. When Han Se-kyung gets back, Seo Yoon-joo drags her downstairs and gives her package, which inside is a diary. She says this is the key of becoming a "Cheongdam -dong daughter-in-law", in return, she must keep her promise that she will never tell anyone of her marriage in France.

Episode 4

Seo Yoon-joo tells Han Se-kyung that in order to go into Cheongdam –dong, she must find herself a "time rabbit" (a person who can introduce her into the upper class circle of Cheongdam-dong). Tommy Hong, the most popular domestic designer in Cheongdam-dong, is the perfect fit for being the "time rabbit". So Han Se-kyung then decides to work part-time at the restaurant where Tommy Hong usually goes to in order to catch his attention. Meanwhile, Cha Seung-joo, full of tears, tells Heo Dong-wook what he has seen about Han Se-kyung. Heo Dong-wook tells Cha Seung-jo that he thinks he might like Han Se-kyung. Back when Seo Yoon-joo has wounded Cha Seung-jo deeply by leaving him, he changes. He tries to find a way that true love exist, that it does not need to be only maintained through money. Han Se-kyung's actions makes him believes that love truly does exists, proving that his thoughts are right. He then recommends Han Se-kyung to Tommy Hong. So Tommy Hong invites Han Se-kyung to an upper class dance ball.

During the dance ball, Han Se-kyung meets Cha Seung-jo, still unaware of Cha Seung-jo's real identity; she asks to see the president of Artemis. Cha Seung-jo makes an excuse of having to answer the President's phone call and leaves. A rich businessman wants Tommy Hong to tell Han Se-kyung that he wants her as his outside lover. Hearing of this, Han Se-kyung feels she has been insulted; she then pours a cup of water onto Tommy Hong. In return, Tommy Hong pours a cup of soy sauce onto Han Se-kyung. Han Se-kyung leaves embarrassingly under the eyes of all guests. Cha Seung-jo sees Han Se-kyung leaving unhappily when he is about to go home. He catches up with her and asks what has happened. After knowing the whole matter, he goes back to the ball, and pours a cup of soy sauce onto Tommy Hong to revenge for Han Se-kyung.

Episode 5

Han Se-kyung is not willing to give up her "time rabbit" after what has happened at the ball. She goes to Tommy Hong to reason with him. But instead, Tommy Hong sees her desire, what she wants in her heart.

Seo Yoon-joo goes to see Tommy Hong; she learns that the person who he is trying to pair up with her husband's sister, Shin In-hwa, is actually Cha Seung-jo.

Disguising himself as Secretary Jin of Artemis' president, Cha Seung-jo asks Han Se-kyung to be the President's personal designer. After taking on the job as a personal designer, she takes Cha Seung-jo to her college and asks him to give the President the expression rabbits that she has made for the President. However, while they are getting ready to leave, Cha Seung-jo accidentally drinks a bottle of poisonous liquid. He is sent to the hospital immediately. When his close employees come to visit him, he tries very hard to hide his identity from Han Se-kyung.

Episode 6

Han Se-kyung's best friend, Choi Ah-jung, accidentally sees her diary on how to get into Cheongdam-dong, and Han Se-kyung then confesses to her on what she is planning to do. Choi Ah-jung helps Han Se-kyung to look into Cha Seung-jo, at that time they know as Secretary Jin. Han Se-kyung got suspicious of Cha Seung-jo when Choi Ah-jung tells her that there is no one called Secretary Jin at all in Artemis. Han Se-kyung then asks Cha Seung-jo fiercely on whom he actually is. Under this moment of pressure, Cha Seung-jo makes a lame excuse that he is actually the President's personal "shadow ninja".

On the other hand, Tommy Hong finds out Cha Seung-jo's real identity. He is not only Artemis' president, but also the son of Cha ll-nam, the president of Royal Corporation. Seo Yoon-joo goes and tells Cha Seung-jo of his possible future engagement with Shin In-hwa, which Cha Seung-jo has no clue about doesn't even consider it at all.

Cha Seung-jo bumps into his father, Cha ll-nam, and they have a very unhappy conversation. Seeing the saddened Cha Seung-jo afterwards, Han Se-kyung encourages him by giving him a high-five. At the same time, she realizes she is in the danger of falling in love with the man in front of her.

Episode 7

Han Se-kyung calls Seo Yoon-joo and asks her the answer of the first danger among the three she must encounter if she wants to go into Cheongdam-dong. Seo Yoon-joo replies that it is love. When Han Se-kyung returns home, she sees that her parents are chasing after her sister, Han Se-jin. Han Se kyung learns that her parents want her sister to quit school for a while and help out their shop. At first, Han Se-jin does not want to, but after Han Se-kyung promise to buy her a new bag, she agrees to do it.

Choi Ah-jung and Secretary Moon are dining out together because Choi Ah-jung wants to gather more information about Artemis' president. The next day, Choi Ah-jung wakes up and Han Se-kyung asks her if she has said anything unnecessary to Secretary Moon. But Choi Ah-jung cannot remember anything. While the Secretary is having a meeting, he seems to not be able to pay any attention to the meeting, but is trying hard to remember exactly what he said to Choi Ah-jung the night before.

When Han Se-kyung meets Cha Seung-jo, Cha Seung-jo tries to close up their distance. They go to pick costumes together. He also put Han Se-kyung's shoes on her. When Han Se-kyung tries to stand up, she almost trip just as Cha Seung-jo catches her in his arms. He kisses Han Se-kyung then. Shocked, Han Se-kyung hurries out the door and gets on a bus immediately.

Both Choi Ah-jung and Secretary Moon still cannot figure out what they said to each other. Choi Ah-jung asks Secretary Moon out to have cake together. They both admit that they cannot remember. Cha Seung-jo thinks about what happens between him and Han Se-kyung, and he is very nervous about it. He decides he is going to ask Han Se-kyung out the following day.

Tommy Hong asks for Cha ll-nam's sponsorship at the upcoming Winter Olympic, using the marriage between Shin In-hwa and Cha Seung-jo.

Seo Yoon-joo is in the hospital because she has had an accident. Han Se-kyung goes and visits her. Seo Yoon-joo tells her she must solve her first problem, which is love, or else she can never succeed. Cha Seung-joo meets up with Han Se-kyung. He apologizes for his rudeness the other day for kissing her. Han Se-kyung tells him she does not want this job anymore, unless she meets the president of Artemis. When Heo Dong-wook knows about this situation, he tells Cha Seung-jo to tell his true identity to Han Se-kyung honestly.

Tommy Hong sees Shin In-hwa and asks her to collaborate with him on a project next season. Tommy Hong reassures Shin In-hwa it is no big deal when she says she hears that Cha Seung-jo has a girlfriend.

Seo Yoon-jo goes to see Cha ll-nam, and tells him that she is the Seo Yoon-jo that he once knew.

Artemis is having a party. Han Se-kyung tells Choi Ah-jung that she received an invitation, and the party dress has already been delivered to her. On the way to the party, both Han Se-kyung and Cha Seung-jo receive a message from Choi Ah-jung and Secretary Moon. The two of them have remembered what they said to each other on that night. Choi Ah-jung tells Han Se-kyung that Cha Seung-jo, the Secretary Jin that she knows him as, is actually the president of Artemis. On the other hand, Secretary Moon tells Cha Seung-jo that Han Se-kyung likes Secretary Jin, which is Cha Seung-jo himself. Cha Seung–jo is very happy to hear the news while Han Se-kyung is not as happy as Cha Seung-jo is.

Episode 8

When meeting up with Cha ll-nam again, Seo Yoon-jo advises him to stop the planned marriage. Now at the party, after battling with his own will, he finally gains the courage and goes into the party. He is ready to indirectly confess to Han Se-kyung in his opening speech. But what he does not know is that Han Se-kyung has left the party because of her shock of the news.

Han Se-kyung runs out, crying, and writes down what she must do in the future in order to marry a rich man. Seo Yoon-jo comes to visit Han Se-kyung late at night. Back to the party, Tommy Hong sees Han Se-kyung's phone that she accidentally leaves at the party and picks it up. He goes through her phone and finds out that she is somewhat using Cha Seung-jo. Han Se-kyung pretends she does not know Cha Seung-jo's real identity. She then writes a letter to Secretary Jin that she likes him. Seeing this, Cha Seung-jo starts to cry because he is so moved, but not realizing the fact that Han Se-kyung has written that letter with a purpose. Not knowing the truth, Cha Seung-jo finally tells Han Se-kyung who he really is. Han Se-kyung, already knowing that, pretends to be shocked.

== Production ==
Loosely based on the chick lit novel Cheongdam-dong Audrey by Lee Hye-kyung, the series is written by Kim Ji-woon and Kim Jin-hee, who also wrote historical dramas Queen Seondeok (MBC, 2009) and Deep Rooted Tree (SBS, 2012). The writers wanted to portray the splendor and vanity of the so-called "Beverly Hills of Seoul" realistically, saying, "We will question the terms of endearment through the youths living the life of dreams. We hope the viewers will ask themselves: Is wealth everything we need? Are we happy now?".

== Original soundtrack ==
=== Volume 1 ===
1. Daddy Long Legs (키다리 아저씨) - Baek A-yeon
2. Love Like This (사랑은 이렇게) - K.Will
3. It's Okay (괜찮아) - Luna
4. Rain Shower (소나기) - Every Single Day
5. Arcane Alice - Lee Kyung-shik
6. Paris - Jung Cha-shik
7. In Your Hands - Lee Kyung-shik
8. Ivory Smile - Kang Hee-chan
9. Blurry Leon - Jung Jae-woo
10. Ache - Romanticisco
11. Blue Moon - Moon Sung-nam
12. Daddy Long Legs (키다리 아저씨) (Inst.)
13. Love Like This (사랑은 이렇게) (Inst.)

=== Volume 2 ===
1. Sorry - Lee Seung-hwan feat. Yozoh
2. Stop Hurting (그만 아파하자) - Melody Day
3. Alice (앨리스) - Every Single Day
4. Daddy Long Legs (키다리 아저씨) (Acoustic Ver.) - Baek A-yeon
5. Dream - Lee Kyung-shik
6. Gypsy - Jung Cha-shik
7. Last Memory - Moon Sung-nam
8. Fashion Work - Jung Jae-woo
9. Farewell - Kang Hee-chan
10. 3 and 4 - Romanticisco
11. Crying Heart - Go Kyung-chun
12. Sorry (Inst.)
13. Daddy Long Legs (키다리 아저씨) (Guitar Ver.)

== Ratings ==
According to AGB Nielsen Media Research, the first two episodes received a nationwide viewership rating of 8.6 percent, both of which were behind its rival May Queen on MBC, while KBS's Dream of the Emperor did not air due to actors exiting because of injuries. The ratings for the third episode rose to double digits of 10.6% but ranked third for the timeslot. However, for the fifth episode, the series overtook Dream of the Emperor and was ranked second for its timeslot, and for the ninth and tenth episodes it was ranked first ahead of MBC's new drama A Hundred Year Legacy.

The series finale recorded its highest ratings with a viewership of 16.6 percent nationwide, and an average of 18.6 percent in the Seoul National Capital Area.

Episode #	Original broadcast date	Average audience share			
Episode #	Original broadcast date	TNmS Ratings		AGB Nielsen	
Episode #	Original broadcast date	Nationwide	Seoul National Capital Area	Nationwide	Seoul National Capital Area
1	1 December 2012	8.7%	10.0%	8.6%	9.3%
2	2 December 2012	8.3%	10.3%	8.6%	9.4%
3	8 December 2012	11.0%	13.3%	10.6%	10.9%
4	9 December 2012	9.7%	12.0%	9.1%	10.1%
5	15 December 2012	13.1%	14.5%	12.5%	13.4%
6	16 December 2012	10.9%	13.1%	10.2%	11.4%
7	22 December 2012	11.0%	13.1%	10.6%	11.9%
8	23 December 2012	10.6%	12.8%	10.9%	12.1%
9	5 January 2013	17.6%	19.8%	15.2%	16.6%
10	6 January 2013	15.0%	17.1%	14.7%	16.2%
11	12 January 2013	15.2%	17.5%	14.4%	15.6%
12	13 January 2013	13.9%	16.3%	13.5%	15.0%
13	19 January 2013	12.9%	13.9%	15.0%	16.2%
14	20 January 2013	13.4%	15.3%	14.4%	16.6%
15	26 January 2013	14.9%	16.7%	15.6%	16.7%
16	27 January 2013	14.8%	17.1%	16.6%	18.6%
