= Pasta (TV series) =

South Korean television series

- Promotional poster
- Hangul: 파스타
- RR: Paseuta
- MR: P'asŭt'a
- Genre: Romantic comedy
- Written by: Seo Sook-hyang
- Directed by: Kwon Seok-jang
- Starring: Gong Hyo-jin; Lee Sun-kyun; Lee Hanee; Alex Chu
- Opening theme: Pasta Intro by Moon Seong-nam
- Ending theme: Lucky Day by Every Single Day
- Country of origin: South Korea
- Original language: Korean
- No. of episodes: 20

Production
- Executive producer: Lee Un-jeong
- Producer: Son Ok-hyun
- Running time: 60 minutes

Original release
- Network: Munhwa Broadcasting Corporation
- Release: January 4 – March 9, 2010

Pasta (Korean: 파스타) is a 2010 South Korean television series starring Gong Hyo-jin, Lee Sun-kyun, Lee Hanee and Alex Chu. The workplace romantic comedy is about the dreams and struggles of a young woman who aspires to become an elite chef. It aired on MBC from January 4 to March 9, 2010 on Mondays and Tuesdays at 21:55 for 20 episodes.

== Synopsis ==
Seo Yoo-kyung started her career as a kitchen assistant at La Sfera restaurant for 3 years. Her dream is to become an Italian cuisine chef. She eventually works her way up to become a chef. One day, the La Sfera restaurant newly hires Choi Hyun-wook, a chef who went to culinary school in Italy. Upon his arrival, the female chefs are fired one by one and Yoo-kyung finds herself to be the last woman standing. She's fired several times but comes up with ways to be rehired by Choi Hyun-wook. Eventually she's rehired permanently when she wins a blind taste contest. The newly hired president, Kim San hires his friend and celebrity chef Sae-young as a co-head chef to work with Hyun-wook. It turns out that Sae-young and Hyun-wook used to date each other when they were both studying at the Italian culinary school. But they broke up after Sae-young sabotaged his wine by boiling it to win a cooking contest. They turn into rivals and try to outdo each other in making the finest Italian cuisine. Working alongside two celebrity chefs, Yoo-kyung feels small and insignificant. She gradually develops feelings for the charismatic Hyun-wook. However, restaurant owner Kim San begins to become attracted to the spunky Yoo-kyung and the relationships between them become fraught with complexities.

== Cast ==
=== Main ===
- Seo Yoo-kyung, played by Gong Hyo-jin
  - The daughter of a Chinese restaurant owner whose mother died of cancer, she dreams of becoming a celebrity chef. Having graduated from a lowly culinary school, she starts the series as a kitchen assistant for 3 years at La Sfera. She has a spunky attitude and she finally gets promoted to cook in the first episode, but after a new head chef, Hyun-wook, is hired, she is fired. She is able to return to her job, thanks to the restaurant manager who intervenes on her behalf. But Yoo-kyung has a long way to go until she will earn any respect from chef Hyun-wook for her cooking skills. She makes an effort to learn as much as she can from Hyun-wook and he, in turn, starts to grow fond of her. However, when Kim San, the restaurant owner of La Sfera, returns, her relationship between Hyun-wook and Kim San change abruptly.
- Choi Hyun-wook, played by Lee Sun-kyun
  - A chef who rose to the top of his profession after starting at the bottom in an Italian restaurant in Sicily. Offered a hefty salary and housing from the La Sfera restaurant, he decides to become the head chef of the establishment. He detests female chefs after having a bad experience in the past and proclaims, "There will be no women in my kitchen". When his ex-girlfriend Sae-young joins him at the restaurant as co-head chef, he frequently quarrels with her and then makes up as they create wonderful cuisine for patrons.
- Oh Sae-young, played by Lee Hanee
  - She's Yoo-kyung's role model as well as her roommate. Sae-young has her own cooking show and is the most celebrated female chef in Korea. During her years in Italy where she went to culinary school, she dated Hyun-wook and ruined his recipe to win a grand prix cooking contest. After returning to Korea, she instantly became a celebrity chef but when she's reunited with Hyun-wook, she has conflicted feelings towards him.
- Kim San, played by Alex Chu
  - He's the actual owner of the La Sfera restaurant, but he hides this fact and poses as a regular restaurant patron for 3 years. One day, he takes a peek at Yoo-kyung's notes and develops an interest in her. Nobody pays much attention to Yoo-kyung, who is a kitchen assistant, but Kim San watches her closely. He helps Yoo-kyung from behind the scenes unbeknownst to Yoo-kyung.

=== Supporting ===
- Lee Hyung-chul as Geum Seok-ho, one of the two sous-chefs in La Sfera
- Lee Sung-min as Seol Joon-seok
- Choi Jae-hwan as Jung Eun-soo, a new kitchen assistant who arrived with Choi Hyun-wook
- Choi Jin-hyuk (Note: Credited as Kim Tae-ho) as Seon woo Deok
- No Min-woo as Philip
- Hyun Woo as Lee Ji-hoon
- Jo Sang-gi as Jung Ho-nam, the chef in charge of the pasta, along with Park Mi-hee
- Baek Bong-ki as Min Seung-jae, chef who cooks the pasta
- Heo Tae-hee as Han Sang-shik, the antipasto assistant.
- Ha Jae-sook as Lee Hee-joo, one of the two sous-chefs in La Sfera
- Jeong Da-hye as Park Mi-hee, one of the two chefs in charge of the pasta along with Jung Ho-nam
- Son Seong-yoon as Park Chan-hee. She is in charge of the antipasto.
- Choi Min as Nemo, one of the waitstaff at La Sfera
- Byun Jung-soo as Kim Kang
- Jang Yong as Seo Jong-goo
- Kim Dong-hee as Seo Yoo-shik
- Yoon Yong-hyun as Gwang-tae
- Jung Dong-hwan as Choi Hyun-wook's mentor chef
- Ryoo Seung-bum as Restaurant client (cameo, ep 9)
- Wayne Richard as Totti Chef

== Reception ==
The culinary drama, which premiered in Korea on January 4, 2010, started off with ratings around 13 percent and went on to breach the 20 percent mark. According to daily statistics released by research firms TNS Media Korea and AGB Nielsen Media Research, it recorded national viewership ratings of 21.5 and 21.2 percent, respectively, for its final episode.

The show received positive feedback from viewers with its well-balanced combination of a good script, directing and acting.

== Ratings ==
Date	Episode	Nationwide	Seoul
2010-01-04	1	12.2% (13th)	13.4% (9th)
2010-01-05	2	11.9% (12th)	12.9% (10th)
2010-01-11	3	11.9% (14th)	13.2% (9th)
2010-01-12	4	12.7% (11th)	14.5% (9th)
2010-01-18	5	10.9% (16th)	12.2% (12th)
2010-01-19	6	13.5% (10th)	15.4% (8th)
2010-01-25	7	13.0% (11th)	15.0% (8th)
2010-01-26	8	14.9% (9th)	17.0% (7th)
2010-02-01	9	14.3% (11th)	16.4% (11th)
2010-02-02	10	15.7% (7th)	18.2% (5th)
2010-02-08	11	15.3% (6th)	17.3% (5th)
2010-02-09	12	16.2% (7th)	17.9% (5th)
2010-02-15	13	14.7% (6th)	15.8% (5th)
2010-02-16	14	16.3% (5th)	18.3% (5th)
2010-02-22	15	14.7% (7th)	16.0% (6th)
2010-02-23	16	16.3% (6th)	18.3% (3rd)
2010-03-01	17	19.7% (3rd)	21.6% (2nd)
2010-03-02	18	19.0% (3rd)	20.5% (2nd)
2010-03-08	19	19.9% (1st)	22.3% (1st)
2010-03-09	20	21.5% (1st)	24.2% (1st)
Average		15.2%	17.0%

Source: TNS Media Korea

== Awards and nominations ==
Year	Award	Category	Recipient	Result
2010	CETV Awards	Top 10 Asian Stars	Gong Hyo-jin	Won
2010	CETV Awards	Top 10 Asian Stars	Lee Sun-kyun	Won
2010	MBC Drama Awards	Best Couple Award	Lee Sun-kyun and Gong Hyo-jin	Won
2010	MBC Drama Awards	Best New Actor	Alex Chu	Nominated
2010	MBC Drama Awards	Top Excellence Award, Actor	Lee Sun-kyun	Nominated
2010	MBC Drama Awards	Top Excellence Award, Actress	Gong Hyo-jin	Won
