= Thank You (TV series) =

- Promotional poster for Thank You
- Genre: Romance; Drama
- Written by: Lee Kyung-hee
- Directed by: Lee Jae-dong
- Starring: Jang Hyuk; Gong Hyo-jin; Seo Shin-ae
- Country of origin: South Korea
- Original language: Korean
- No. of episodes: 16

Production
- Production company: SidusHQ/The Film

Original release
- Network: Munhwa Broadcasting Corporation
- Release: March 21 – May 10, 2007

Thank You (Korean: 고맙습니다; RR: Gomapseumnida) is a 2007 South Korean television series starring Jang Hyuk, Gong Hyo-jin, Seo Shin-ae, Shin Sung-rok and Shin Goo. It aired on MBC from March 21 to May 10, 2007 on Wednesdays and Thursdays at 21:55 for 16 episodes.

The drama was actor Jang Hyuk's successful comeback after his mandatory military service and draft-dodging scandal. He gained the empathy of viewers after portraying a self-centered doctor whose life changes when he meets a single mother and her HIV-positive daughter.

== Synopsis ==
Doctor Min Gi-seo (Jang Hyuk) is a surgeon whose wealthy background and superior talent causes him to be arrogant and curt with others. But when his girlfriend Ji-min (Choi Kang-hee) dies of cancer after he failed to save her on the operating table, he is haunted by her confession that she had unwittingly given a young girl HIV via a contaminated blood transfusion when she was a medical intern years ago and never owned up to her mistake. Grieving and needing to make amends on Ji-min's behalf, Gi-seo searches for the child Bom (Korean for "spring"), and finds her living on Pureun-do ("Blue Island"). The precocious eight-year-old Bom (Seo Shin-ae) is innocently unaware of her condition, and she lives happily with her mother Young-shin (Gong Hyo-jin), and her great-grandfather Mr. Lee (Shin Goo) who's always wandering off and loves choco pie. Ever since Bom's diagnosis, Young-shin has worked hard to care for her daughter and senile grandfather, keeping a strong face and cheery front despite their poor circumstances and the difficulties of being a single mother. Young-shin has always been mum about Bom's paternity, but in the small community of Pureun-do, rumors are rife that the father is Choi Seok-hyun (Shin Sung-rok), son of the richest woman (Kang Boo-ja) in town. Seok-hyun currently resides in Seoul with his fiancée (Kim Sung-eun), until work-related matters take him back to the island for the first time in a decade. Upon seeing Young-shin again, Seok-hyun had no idea that she'd had a child, and doesn't believe her assertions that Bom isn't his. As their paths continue to cross, he becomes jealous of Gi-seo and realizes that he isn't quite over her. Meanwhile, to keep an eye on Bom, Gi-seo decides to rent a room at Young-shin's house. At first he mocks the seemingly backward, rural day-to-day life on Pureun-do, but as he observes the Lee family and their constant kindness and selflessness at close quarters, Gi-seo finds himself slowly changing and falling in love with Young-shin. But when the townspeople later learn that Bom has HIV, they must all deal with the fear and discrimination that follows.

== Cast ==
- Jang Hyuk as Min Gi-seo
- Gong Hyo-jin as Lee Young-shin
- Seo Shin-ae as Lee Bom, Young-shin's daughter
- Shin Sung-rok as Choi Seok-hyun
- Shin Goo as Mr. Lee / Lee Byung-gook, Young-shin's grandfather
- Kang Boo-ja as Kang Gook-ja, Seok-hyun's mother
- Kim Sung-eun as Seo Eun-hee, Seok-hyun's fiancée
- Ryu Seung-soo as Oh Jong-soo, local doctor of Pureun-do Public Health Center
- Jo Mi-ryung as Park So-ran, nurse
- Kim Ha-kyun as Park Taek-dong, shopkeeper
- Jeon Won-joo as Song Chang-ja, neighbor with a crush on Mr. Lee
- Kim Ki-bang as Song Doo-seob, Chang-ja's son
- Kil Yong-woo as Min Joon-ho, Gi-seo's father
- Hong Yeo-jin as Kang Hye-jung, Gi-seo's mother
- Yoo Min-ho as Lee Young-woo, Young-shin's brother
- Yang Hyun-woo as Choi Young-joo, Seok-hyun's nephew
- Yoo Yeon-mi as Bo-ram, Bom's friend
- Choi Kang-hee as Cha Ji-min, Gi-seo's girlfriend (cameo, ep 1)
- Kim Soo-ro as Dr. Oh's photographer brother (cameo, ep 16)
- Um Hyo-sup (cameo, ep 12-13)

== Production ==
Jang Hyuk reportedly studied the 1998 film Christmas in August in preparation for his role. He said at the press conference, "I want to delicately express a man who is transformed by love. [...] This drama deals with the disease HIV/AIDS, but it is also a story of hope and miracles."

Jang and Gong Hyo-jin previously starred together in the 2001 film Volcano High. This was also Gong's second collaboration with writer Lee Kyung-hee, after the 2003 drama Sang Doo! Let's Go to School.

Choi Kang-hee, who made a cameo appearance in episode 1, was dating director Lee Jae-dong at the time (they had previously worked together on the 2004 drama Sweet Buns).

Director Lee Jae-dong spent weeks searching for the ideal shooting location for the fictional Pureun-do ("Blue Island"). He settled on Jeungdo, Sinan County, South Jeolla Province, which is located on the Korean east coast. Young-shin and Bom's house in the TV series was specifically chosen by Lee, and renovations were made to the house with permission from the town residents.

== Reception ==
Compared to its competition in the same timeslot, The Devil (KBS2) and Witch Yoo Hee (SBS), Thank You premiered quietly to little hype or pre-show buzz due to lead actor Jang Hyuk's draft-dodging scandal. But it unexpectedly rose to number one in its timeslot, making Jang's comeback a success.

Apart from the cast and writer Lee Kyung-hee who won recognition at the MBC Drama Awards and the Baeksang Arts Awards, respectively, the TV series also received the Special Media Award from Amnesty International. The drama was recognized for "its frank, yet sensitive portrayal of a young HIV patient and her family and friends; it dealt with a touchy subject that had not been broached in other TV dramas and taught the audience to respect AIDS patients and other underprivileged members of our society."

== Ratings ==
Date	Episode	Nationwide	Seoul
2007-03-21	1	12.6% (10th)	13.2% (10th)
2007-03-22	2	14.6% (9th)	15.6% (7th)
2007-03-28	3	13.7% (10th)	14.9% (8th)
2007-03-29	4	15.3% (9th)	15.3% (8th)
2007-04-04	5	13.4% (10th)	14.1% (9th)
2007-04-05	6	15.4% (10th)	16.3% (8th)
2007-04-11	7	14.6% (8th)	15.8% (7th)
2007-04-12	8	16.2% (7th)	17.0% (6th)
2007-04-18	9	16.0% (7th)	17.3% (7th)
2007-04-19	10	17.2% (4th)	18.4% (3rd)
2007-04-25	11	17.1% (5th)	17.7% (6th)
2007-04-26	12	16.8% (5th)	17.2% (4th)
2007-05-02	13	17.4% (5th)	18.3% (3rd)
2007-05-03	14	21.2% (2nd)	24.0% (2nd)
2007-05-09	15	18.5% (4th)	19.5% (4th)
2007-05-10	16	19.2% (3rd)	20.6% (3rd)
Average		16.2%	17.2%

Source: TNmS Media Korea

== Awards ==
Year presented, name of the award ceremony, award category, nominated work and the result of the nomination
Year	Award	Category	Nominated work	Result	Ref.
2007	Amnesty International	10th Special Media Award (2007)	Thank you	Won	
2007	Blue Media Award hosted by the Korean Women's Association	Family Award	Thank you	Won	
2007	MBC Drama Awards	Top Excellence Award, Actress	Gong Hyo-jin	Won	
2007	MBC Drama Awards	Golden Acting Award, Actor in a Miniseries	Jang Hyuk	Won	
2007	MBC Drama Awards	Best Young Actress	Seo Shin-ae	Won	
2008	44th Baeksang Arts Awards	Best TV Screenplay	Lee Kyung-hee	Won	

== Remake ==
A Chinese remake titled Angel's Happiness (天使的幸福) aired in 2017, starring Ming Dao and Cecilia Liu.
