= Angelo (TV series) =

Chinese TV drama

- Also known as: Happiness of an Angel
- Genre: Romance; Melodrama
- Based on: Thank You by Lee Kyung-hee
- Written by: Wang Ming-tai
- Directed by: Wang Ming-tai
- Starring: Cecilia Liu; Ming Dao; Jeremy Tsui; Jessie Chiang
- Country of origin: China
- Original language: Mandarin
- No. of seasons: 1
- No. of episodes: 30

Production
- Production location: Sanya
- Production companies: H&R Century Pictures

Original release
- Network: Hunan TV
- Release: 22 May 2017

Angelo
- Simplified Chinese: 天使的幸福
Transcriptions
Standard Mandarin
- Hanyu Pinyin: Tian Shi De Xing Fu

Angelo (Chinese: 天使的幸福) is a 2017 Chinese television series starring Cecilia Liu and Ming Dao. It is a remake of the South Korean drama Thank You written by Lee Kyung-hee. Filming took place from October 10, 2011 to January 15, 2012. After five years, Hunan TV announced that it will be airing the series via its online platform Mango TV on 22 May 2017 every Monday and Tuesday at 18:00 (CST).

== Synopsis ==
An Jieluo is an outstanding doctor whose wealthy background and talent causes him to be arrogant and curt. But due to his family problems and his failure to save his terminally-ill girlfriend, he begins to give up on life. He is haunted by her confession that she had unwittingly infected a young girl with HIV via a contaminated blood transfusion when she was a medical intern years ago and never owned up to her mistake. Grieving and needing to make amends on her behalf, Jieluo searches for the child Liping and finds her on Pehu Island. He meets the child, who is living happily with her mother Li Xiaohan, innocently unaware of her condition. Li Xiaohan possesses extraordinary beauty, but her poor family background and lack of education makes her feel inferior. Still, Xiaohan works hard in hope of a better life for her and Liping. Jieluo was tasked by his mother to help her in renovating the island, and thus lived in Xiaohan's lodge. While executing the project, Jieluo runs into a problem when he tried to carry out the acquisition of a land property, but it was solved with the help of Xiaohan. Despite their contrasting personalities, Jieluo and Xiaohan began to develop an understanding of each other while working together, and they slowly fell in love and becomes a father figure to Xiaohan's daughter. However, their mother was against them being together and wanted Xiaohan to leave Jieluo in exchange for the continuation of the island's renovation project. For the benefit of everyone living on the island, Xiaohan decides to disappear. This dealt a great blow to Jieluo, and finding Xiaohan became his only goal. However, just when they were about to reunite, a fatal car accident forces their life to be in peril.

== Cast ==
=== Main ===
- Cecilia Liu as Li Xiaohan

A strong and determined single mother.

- Ming Dao as An Jieluo

An outstanding doctor with an exemplary family background, who is curt and arrogant.

- Jeremy Tsui as Jiang Fengen

Li Xiaohan's ex-boyfriend and Liping's father.

- Jessie Chiang as Xu Yiyun

A wealthy girl who is in love with Jiang Fengen.

- Tang Zhen as Li Liping

Li Xiaohan's daughter. An optimistic and cheerful child who only wishes for her mother to be happy. She is an HIV patient.

=== Supporting ===
- Hong Zilin as Xiao Xi
- Anthony Xie as A Xu, Xiaohan's younger brother
- Tian Miao as An Jieluo's mother
- Ge Lei as Jiang Fengen's mother
- Wang Mengli as Wei Wei
- Liu Jin as Village Chief
- Xiao Xingfei as Meng De
- An Long as A Sheng
- Xu Yuan as Jun Jun

=== Special appearance ===
- Lv Jiarong as Yan Youfeng, Jieluo's ex-girlfriend

== Soundtrack ==
Type	Song Title	Lyricist	Composer	Performer
Opening theme song	"Suddenly Missing Her" (突然好想愛她)	Ming Dao	Jeremy Ji	Ming Dao
Ending theme song	"No Way to Retreat" (無路可退)	Rui Ye, Zeng Zhenru	Yao Shuhuan	Ming Dao
Insert song	"The Feeling of Liking Someone" (喜歡一個人的心情)	Jessie Chiang	Yao Shuhuan	Jessie Chiang
