= Chocolate (South Korean TV series) =

2019 South Korean television series

- Promotional poster
- Hangul: 초콜릿
- RR: Chokollit
- MR: Ch'ok'ollit
- Genre: Drama
- Written by: Lee Kyung-hee
- Directed by: Lee Hyung-min
- Starring: Yoon Kye-sang; Ha Ji-won
- Country of origin: South Korea
- Original language: Korean
- No. of episodes: 16

Production
- Producer: Pyo Jong-rok
- Production locations: South Korea; Greece
- Running time: 60 minutes
- Production companies: JYP Pictures; Drama House

Original release
- Network: JTBC
- Release: November 29, 2019 – January 18, 2020

Chocolate (Korean: 초콜릿; RR: Chokollit) is a 2019 South Korean television series starring Yoon Kye-sang, Ha Ji-won, Jang Seung-jo, Teo Yoo and Min Jin-woong. Produced by JYP Pictures, it aired on JTBC from November 29, 2019 to January 18, 2020. The series is based on the Sampoong Department Store collapse incident event in 1995.

== Synopsis ==
The story of a man who became a neurosurgeon though he dreamt of becoming a cook, and a woman who became a cook because of him.

== Cast ==
=== Main ===
Actor	Character	Role
Yoon Kye-sang	Lee Kang	Raised in seaside town Wando at his mother's restaurant. Moves to Seoul and becomes a neurosurgeon. Works at Geosung University Hospital before changing to Geosung Hospice.
Ha Ji-won	Moon Cha-yeong	Raised to be an actress but becomes a chef. Abandoned by her mother and survives a shopping mall collapse.
Jang Seung-jo	Lee Joon	Kang's cousin. Also a neurosurgeon but wants to be a potter.
Teo Yoo	Kwon Min-seong	Kang's best friend. A lawyer whose father administrates Geosung Hospice. He pursues Cha-yeong.
Min Jin-woong	Moon Tae-hyun	Cha-yeong's brother who also abandoned her but shows up later to mooch off of his sister.

=== Supporting ===
==== Kang's family ====
- Kang Boo-ja as Han Yong-seol - Kang's & Joon's grandmother. CEO of Geosung Hospital.
- Lee Jae-ryong as Lee Seung-hoon - Joon's father
- Kim Sun-kyung as Yoon Hye-mi - Joon's mother
- Lee Eon-jung as Jeong Soo-hee - Kang's mother
- Yoon Ye-hee as Lee Seo-hoon - Joon's paternal aunt

==== People at the hospice ====
- Kim Won-hae as Kwon Hyeon-seok - Administrator of Geosung Hospice, Kwon Min-Seong's father.
- Kim Ho-jung as Han Seon-ae - Kwon's ex-wife. Chef who volunteers in the hospice kitchen.
- Ha Young as Kim Hee-ju - Hospice patient. A potter who taught Joon pottery.
- Yeom Hye-ran as Ha Yeong-sil - Hospice nurse.
- Lee Ju-yoen as Bae Na-ra - Hospice nurse whose father forcefully removes her from the hospice.

==== Others ====
- Yoo In-soo as Jo Seung-goo
- Lee Yong-yi as Jang Sook-ja
- Jang Duk-joo as Ha Dong-goo - fisherman who loved Kang's mother and treated Kang as a son
- Lee Hyo-bin as Kim In-joo - Kwon Min-seong's fiance

=== Special appearances ===
- Kim Yu-bin as Oh Jeong-Bok (Ep. 11, Ep. 12 & Ep. 13) - Kang's childhood friend and Ha Dong-goo's niece
- Lina as woman in the museum (Ep. 16) - Lina and Jang Seung-jo (Joon) are married in real life
- Yoon Bo-ra as Hui Na (Ep. 13, Ep 15 & Ep 16) - hospice patient and youtuber.

== Production ==
Chocolate marks screenwriter Lee Kyung-hee and director Lee Hyung-min's first collaboration in 15 years, after having worked together on the critically acclaimed television series I'm Sorry, I Love You (2004).

== Original soundtrack ==
Chocolate OST

Soundtrack album by Various artists
- Released: 2019
- Genre: Soundtrack
- Languages: Korean; English
- Labels: Sony Music; JTBC Content Hub

=== Part 1 ===
Released on December 1, 2019
No.	Title	Lyrics	Music	Artist	Length
1.	"Sweetest Thing"	Kiggen; ESBEE	Kiggen; ESBEE; The Apple of My Eye; BYMORE	Seventeen (Note: Performed by Seventeen members Joshua, Wonwoo, DK, Seungkwan and Dino.)	3:39
2.	"Sweetest Thing" (Inst.)		Kiggen; ESBEE; The Apple of My Eye; BYMORE		3:39
Total length:					7:18

=== Part 2 ===
Released on December 7, 2019
No.	Title	Lyrics	Music	Artist	Length
1.	"Tree (Chocolate OST Ver.)" (나무)	Car, the Garden; Youra	Car, the Garden; 623	Car, the Garden	3:47
2.	"Tree (Chocolate OST Ver.)" (Inst.)		Car, the Garden; 623		3:47
Total length:					7:34

=== Part 3 ===
Released on December 8, 2019
No.	Title	Lyrics	Music	Artist	Length
1.	"Always Be Here"	Jung Ye-kyung	Jung Ye-kyung; ID:Earth	Jung Jin-woo	3:35
2.	"Always Be Here" (Inst.)		Jung Ye-kyung; ID:Earth		3:35
Total length:					7:10

=== Part 4 ===
Released on December 14, 2019
No.	Title	Lyrics	Music	Artist	Length
1.	"Always Be Here"	Jung Ye-kyung	Jung Ye-kyung; ID:Earth	Ha Jin	3:35
2.	"Always Be Here" (Inst.)		Jung Ye-kyung; ID:Earth		3:35
Total length:					7:10

=== Part 5 ===
Released on December 15, 2019
No.	Title	Lyrics	Music	Artist	Length
1.	"Just Look For You" (그저 바라본다)	Kim Ji-soo; JK	Kim Ji-soo	Ailee	3:42
2.	"Just Look For You" (Inst.)		Kim Ji-soo		3:42
Total length:					7:24

=== Part 6 ===
Released on December 21, 2019
No.	Title	Lyrics	Music	Artist	Length
1.	"Greeting (From. Chocolate)" (마중)	Hwang Seok-ju	Seo Jae-ha; Cho Young-soo; Kim Young-sung	Kassy	3:26
2.	"Greeting (From. Chocolate)" (Inst.)		Seo Jae-ha; Cho Young-soo; Kim Young-sung		3:26
Total length:					6:52

=== Part 7 ===
Released on December 22, 2019
No.	Title	Lyrics	Music	Artist	Length
1.	"Special (From. Chocolate)"	Jung Ye-kyung; ID:Earth	Jung Ye-kyung; ID:Earth	Yubin	3:33
2.	"Special (From. Chocolate)" (Inst.)		Jung Ye-kyung; ID:Earth		3:33
Total length:					7:06

=== Part 8 ===
Released on December 28, 2019
No.	Title	Lyrics	Music	Artist	Length
1.	"Alone (From. Chocolate)" (짝사랑)	Soulder Gang	Soulder Gang	Hui	3:49
2.	"Alone (From. Chocolate)" (Inst.)		Soulder Gang		3:49
Total length:					7:38

=== Part 9 ===
Released on January 5, 2020
No.	Title	Lyrics	Music	Artist	Length
1.	"I'll Be Going (From. Chocolate)" (먼저 가볼게요)	Jung Ye-kyung	Jung Ye-kyung; Ha Ji-woong	Ha Ji-woong	4:16
2.	"I'll Be Going (From. Chocolate)" (Inst.)		Jung Ye-kyung; Ha Ji-woong		4:16
Total length:					8:32

=== Part 10 ===
Released on January 12, 2020
No.	Title	Lyrics	Music	Artist	Length
1.	"Right Time and Right Place"	Jung Ye-kyung	Jung Ye-kyung	Stella Jang	3:54
2.	"Right Time and Right Place" (Inst.)		Jung Ye-kyung		3:54
Total length:					7:48

=== Part 11 ===
Released on January 12, 2020
No.	Title	Artist	Length
1.	"You & I"	ID: Earth	4:22
2.	"Right Time and Right Place" (Inst.)		4:22
Total length:			7:48

=== Chart performance ===
Title	Year	Peak positions	Remarks	Ref.
Title	Year	KOR	Remarks	Ref.
"Just Look For You" (그저 바라본다) (Ailee)	2019	85	Part 5	

== Viewership ==
Chocolate : South Korea viewers per episode (thousands)

Season	Episode number																Average
Season	1	2	3	4	5	6	7	8	9	10	11	12	13	14	15	16	Average
1	821	1028	930	1062	844	842	879	931	814	809	873	919	698	959	755	959	883

Source: Audience measurement performed nationwide by Nielsen Media Research.

Average TV viewership ratings
Ep.	Original broadcast date	Average audience share (AGB Nielsen)	
Ep.	Original broadcast date	Nationwide	Seoul
1	November 29, 2019	3.475%	4.243%
2	November 30, 2019	4.364%	5.280%
3	December 6, 2019	4.316%	4.745%
4	December 7, 2019	4.603%	5.370%
5	December 13, 2019	4.372%	4.963%
6	December 14, 2019	4.173%	4.243%
7	December 20, 2019	4.265%	4.560%
8	December 21, 2019	4.230%	4.291%
9	December 27, 2019	4.142%	4.794%
10	December 28, 2019	3.812%	4.367%
11	January 3, 2020	4.177%	4.615%
12	January 4, 2020	4.205%	4.717%
13	January 10, 2020	3.804%	4.317%
14	January 11, 2020	4.215%	4.917%
15	January 17, 2020	3.778%	3.982%
16	January 18, 2020	4.579%	5.071%
Average		4.157%	4.655%
In the table above, the blue numbers represent the lowest ratings and the red numbers represent the highest ratings.; This drama aired on a cable channel/pay TV which normally has a relatively smaller audience compared to free-to-air TV/public broadcasters (KBS, SBS, MBC and EBS).

== See also ==
- Sampoong Department Store collapse
- Rain or Shine: 2017 JTBC television series, also inspired by Sampoong Department Store collapse.
