= Moon Embracing the Sun =

2012 South Korean historical television drama series

- Promotional poster
- Also known as: The Moon that Embraces the Sun; The Sun and the Moon
- Hangul: 해를 품은 달
- RR: Haereul pumeun dal
- MR: Haerŭl p'umŭn tal
- Genre: Historical; Romance; Fantasy
- Based on: Moon Embracing the Sun by Jung Eun-gwol
- Written by: Jin Soo-wan
- Directed by: Kim Do-hoon; Lee Seong-jun
- Starring: Han Ga-in; Kim Soo-hyun; Jung Il-woo; Kim Min-seo
- Music by: Kim Joon-seok; Jeong Se-rin
- Country of origin: South Korea
- Original language: Korean
- No. of episodes: 20 (+2 specials)

Production
- Executive producer: Moon Jeong-soo
- Producer: Oh Gyeong-hun
- Production company: Pan Entertainment

Original release
- Network: MBC TV
- Release: January 4 – March 15, 2012

Moon Embracing the Sun (Korean: 해를 품은 달) is a 2012 South Korean television drama series, starring Han Ga-in, Kim Soo-hyun, Jung Il-woo, and Kim Min-seo. It aired on MBC from January 4 to March 15, 2012, on Wednesdays and Thursdays at 21:55 for 20 episodes.

The historical-fantasy drama is adapted from the novel of the same name written by Jung Eun-gwol. It tells of a poignant love story between a fictional king of the Joseon period and a female shaman and the conflicts and conspiracy of vying political powers.

The series reached a peak rating of 42.2%. It won the Best Drama award and Best Actor award for Kim Soo-hyun in the television category at the 48th Baeksang Arts Awards, and multiple awards at 2012 MBC Drama Awards, including Drama of the Year and Actor of the Year for Kim Soo-hyun.

== Synopsis ==
The Queen Dowager orders the assassination of her stepson in order to protect her own son's throne. A-ri, a shaman of the Royal Star Mansion (Royal Astrology House), witnesses the murder. The pregnant wife of the palace's Chief Scholar helps her escape, and she vows to protect the unborn child, who has a "noble fate."

A-ri is arrested, tortured, and imprisoned. She tells her friend and fellow shaman, Jang Nok-yeong, to look after the unborn child in her stead. A-ri is declared guilty of treason and killed.

Years later, Heo Yeon-woo, the child A-ri swore to protect, and Crown Prince Lee Hwon fall in love. Prince Yangmyung, the Crown Prince's older half-brother, has also fallen in love with Yeon-woo, who does not reciprocate his feelings.

The Queen Dowager seeks to make Yoon Bo-kyung, the daughter of the Prime Minister and her blood relative, the Crown Princess in order to maintain her clan's power. However, the King is impressed by Yeon-Woo's intelligence and chooses her to be Lee Hwon's wife, infuriating Prime Minister Yoon and the Queen Dowager, who secretly orders Nok-yeong to cast a deadly curse on the new Princess.

Yeon-woo is diagnosed with an unidentifiable illness, expelled from the palace, and loses her title. She "dies" from this illness and is buried, but Nok-yeong digs her out of the grave, because the spell is temporary and only mimics the appearance of death. However, Yeon-woo is so traumatized by being buried alive that she has lost all of her memories. She and Nok-yeong leave the capital.

Crown Prince Lee Hwon unwillingly marries Bo-kyung, but refuses to consummate the marriage by citing an unnamed illness and continues to brood over his "dead" first love.

Eight years later, Lee Hwon is now king and Yeon-woo became Shaman Wol (which means "moon"). Unaware of Wol's true identity, the Grand Royal Queen Dowager calls her to the palace so that she can cure her grandson's "illness." The King is struck by Wol's unmistakable resemblance to Yeon-woo, and he quietly launches an investigation into Yeon-woo's death.

Meanwhile, Wol struggles to understand the strange memories of her life as Yeon-woo, which she interprets as shamanic visions. She must fight Queen Yoon, the Grand Royal Queen Dowager and Prime Minister Yoon in order to reclaim her rightful place as the Queen of Joseon. Political intrigue continues to build and comes shockingly to a head as Lee Hwon fights for his throne and the woman he loves.

== Cast ==
=== Main ===
- Han Ga-in as Lady Heo Yeon-woo / Shaman Wol
  - Kim Yoo-jung as 13-year-old Lady Heo Yeon-woo

'Moon Embracing the Sun': Although she is destined to be the Queen of Joseon, Yeon-woo is cheated out of her fate by the scheming Queen Dowager and Prime Minister Yoon. She is appointed Crown Princess, but she mysteriously dies before the wedding. In reality, she loses her memory and becomes a shaman. Eight years later, she returns to the palace as Shaman Wol and is struck by her inexplicable attraction to the king and her strange "visions" about the king's mysterious first love.

- Kim Soo-hyun as Lee Hwon, King of Joseon
  - Yeo Jin-goo as 15-year-old Lee Hwon, Crown Prince of Joseon

'Sun Reaching for the Moon': Lee Hwon is the intelligent and kind boy who falls in love with Heo Yeon-woo and even after her sudden death, he remains devoted to her memory. When he meets Wol, he has doubts about Yeon-woo's death and begins an investigation, unearthing political machinations and dark secrets.

- Jung Il-woo as Prince Yangmyung
  - Lee Tae-ri (Note: Credited as Lee Min-ho.) as young Prince Yangmyung

'Overshadowed by the Sun': Yangmyung is Lee Hwon's half-brother. Although he is the elder brother, he is the son of the king's concubine and therefore ineligible for the throne. He struggles to reconcile his lifelong, unrequited love for Yeon-woo, his love for his brother, and his attraction to Shaman Wol.

- Kim Min-seo as Lady Yoon Bo-kyung / Queen Yoon
  - Kim So-hyun as young Lady Yoon Bo-kyung

'A Mirror longing to be the Moon': Bo-kyung is used by the Queen Dowager and her father, Prime Minister Yoon, in order to maintain their clan's power. After Yeon-woo's death, she becomes Lee Hwon's Crown Princess. She remains in love with Lee Hwon all her life, but he still loves Yeon-woo.

=== Supporting ===
==== Heo clan ====
- Sunwoo Jae-duk as Lord Heo Young-jae

Yeon-woo and Yeom's father. He is King Seongjo's trusted advisor and an enemy to Prime Minister Yoon.

- Yang Mi-kyung as Madam Shin Jung-kyung

Yeon-woo and Yeom's mother. She grieves over her daughter and husband's deaths.

- Song Jae-hee as Lord Heo Yeom
  - Im Si-wan as 17-year-old Young Master Heo Yeom

Yeon-woo's older brother and Hwon's tutor. After Yeon-woo's death, his family falls from grace and he marries Princess Minhwa.

- Yoon Seung-ah as Seol
  - Seo Ji-hee as young Seol

Yeon-woo's personal servant. She protects Yeon-woo during her time as Shaman Wol.

==== Royal household ====
- Kim Young-ae as the Grand Royal Queen Dowager

The mother of King Seongjo and grandmother of Lee Hwon. She kills Prince Uiseong in order to ensure that her son will become king and attempts to kill Yeon-woo in order to appoint her own relative to be Lee Hwon's wife and future queen. She and Prime Minister Yoon work together to protect their family's interests.

- Ahn Nae-sang as King Seongjo

Father of Lee Hwon, Prince Yangmyung and Princess Minhwa. He is haunted by his beloved half-brother's death and the knowledge that his own mother killed him. In order to prevent such conflict between his own sons, he hides his love for Yangmyung.

- Kim Sun-kyung as Queen Sohye, later the Queen Dowager

Mother of Lee Hwon.

- Kim Ye-ryeong as Royal Noble Consort Hui of the Miryang Park clan

Mother of Yangmyung. King Seongjo's concubine. She has no political ambition and retires to a Buddhist monastery.

- Nam Bo-ra as Princess Minhwa
  - Jin Ji-hee as young Princess Minhwa

Lee Hwon's younger sister. She falls in love with Yeom and is determined to marry him at all costs.

- Song Jae-rim as Lord Kim Jae-woon
  - Lee Won-keun as 15-year-old Young Master Kim Jae-woon

'Devil Swordman': An officer in the Royal Guard, he is the King's bodyguard. His loyalty to Lee Hwon strains his friendship with Yangmyung.

- Jung Eun-pyo as Hyung-sun

Chief Eunuch Hyung-sun is Lee Hwon's trusted confidante and friend.

- Kim Min-kyung as Court Lady Min

Coming from Yeom's family in Bukcheon, she serves as lady-in-waiting to Princess Minhwa.

- Chu Gwi-jung as Court Lady Jo

Queen Yoon's lady-in-waiting since entering the palace as Crown Princess.

==== Royal Star Mansion (Seungsucheong) ====
- Jeon Mi-seon as Jang Nok-young

Nok-young is the head shaman. She is forced to obey the Queen Dowager's order to curse Yeon-woo, but she secretly saves her and raises her as Shaman Wol.

- Kim Ik-tae as Hye Gak

A Taoist priest who helped Nok-young escape with Yeon-woo.

- Bae Noo-ri as Jan-shil
  - Jo Min-ah as young Jan-shil

A shaman with powerful visions who ultimately succeeds Nok-young as the head shaman.

- Jang Young-nam as A-ri

A shaman who vows to help Yeon-woo from beyond the grave.

==== Yoon clan and officials ====
- Kim Eung-soo as Lord Yoon Dae-hyung

Prime Minister Yoon is Bo-kyung's father and the leader of the Yoon clan. He is a greedy politician who seeks to expand his family's wealth and power.

- Jang Hee-soo as Madam Kim

Wife of Prime Minister Yoon and Bo-kyung's mother.

- Seo Hyun-chul as Lord Shim San

Deputy Minister of Personnel, who was named Chief Royal Secretary.

- Lee Seung-hyung as Lord Han Jae-gil

Mayor, later became Minister of Defense.

- Kim Seung-wook as Lord Yoon Soo-chan

Minister of Taxation, promoted to Minister of Personnel.

- Yoon Hee-seok as Lord Hong Gyu-tae

Favored by the King, he is a former president of the student body at Sungkyunkwan, who became a secret investigator for the Uigeumbu (Court of Justice).

== Production ==
Based on the novel by Jung Eun-gwol, the screenplay was written by Jin Soo-wan (writer of Capital Scandal) and directed by Kim Do-hoon (who previously directed Royal Family) and Lee Seong-jun (who previously directed Gyebaek).

This production marked Han Ga-in's first historical drama and return to television since Bad Guy in 2010. It is also Jung Il-woo's second historical drama following The Return of Iljimae in 2009.

Filming began in November 2011, with child actors for the first six episodes, followed by the script reading session with their adult counterparts on December 25, at MBC Dream Center in Ilsan.

In February 2012, there were talks of an extension of four episodes to the 20-episode drama. The production company, Pan Entertainment, later confirmed that there would be no extension and the series was to end on its original date of March 8, 2012. However it did not end till March 15, 2012, because director Kim Do-hoon joined the MBC strike leading to the last two episodes being delayed for a week, and replaced with two special episodes.

=== Filming locations ===
Most of the royal palace scenes were filmed on location at MBC Dramia located at Cheoin District, Yongin, Gyeonggi Province, where other historical dramas such as Dong Yi, Jumong and Queen Seondeok were also filmed. The House of Choi Cham-pan was used as Yeon-woo's childhood home and the Korean Folk Village was used for local markets, private residences of commoners and night scenes.

=== International broadcast ===
In March 2012, the drama's broadcast rights were sold to eight Asian countries, including Japan, Thailand, Hong Kong, Singapore, Taiwan, Malaysia, Sri Lanka, Indonesia and the Philippines. At that time it set the record as the most profitable drama for MBC, which was later surpassed by Arang and the Magistrate in August 2012. It was made available on Netflix in 2015 in the US, later also in other territories.

== Original soundtrack ==
Moon Embracing the Sun: Original Sound Track

Soundtrack album by Various Artists
- Released: 2012
- Genres: Pop, K-pop, soundtrack
- Labels: Pan; RIAK; Vitamin; VDCD-6385

=== Part 1 ===
Released January 11, 2012
No.	Title	Artist	Length
1.	"The Moonlight is setting" (달빛이직)	Heora	3:40
2.	"The Moonlight is setting" (Inst.)		3:40
Total length:			7:50

=== Part 2 ===
Released January 17, 2012
No.	Title	Artist	Length
1.	"Back in Time" (시간을 거슬러)	Lyn	3:31
2.	"Back in Time" (Inst.)		3:31
Total length:			7:52

=== Part 3 ===
Released January 26, 2012
No.	Title	Artist	Length
1.	"Path of Tears" (눈뭄자)	Wheesung	3:50
2.	"Path of Tears" (Inst.)		3:50
Total length:			8:18

=== Part 4 ===
Released February 9, 2012
No.	Title	Artist	Length
1.	"Shadow" (그림자)	Monday Kiz	3:56
2.	"Shadow" (Inst.)		3:56
Total length:			7:02

=== Part 5 ===
Released February 23, 2012
No.	Title	Artist	Length
1.	"I hope It isn't" (아니기를)	Lee Ki-chan	3:47
2.	"I hope It isn't"		3:47
Total length:			8:24

=== Part 6 ===
Released March 3, 2012
No.	Title	Artist	Length
1.	"The One and Only you" (그대안사람)	Kim Soo-hyun	3:52
2.	"The Only and Only you" (Inst.)		3:52
Total length:			7:44

Disc 2:
No.	Title	Artist	Length
1.	"The Moon that embraces the sun (Opening Title)"	Various Artists	2:05
2.	"The Sorrow Song of Love"	Various Artists	2:40
3.	"Song of the moon"	Various Artists	1:45
4.	"Dance of butterflies"	Various Artists	2:15
5.	"The Morning of Palace"	Various Artists	2:32
6.	"Misty rain falls"	Various Artists	3:25
7.	"Hidden Court Room"	Various Artists	2:22
8.	"Long Love Wisp"	Various Artists	2:47
9.	"Two Suns And One Moon"	Various Artists	2:11
10.	"Markets Street"	Various Artists	1:56
11.	"Like petal, Like a flame"	Various Artists	4:06
12.	"Tears of the Sun"	Various Artists	2:27
13.	"Hidden Moon"	Various Artists	3:02
14.	"Spirit Appeasement Ceremony"	Various Artists	3:02
15.	"Black Magic"	Various Artists	1:46
16.	"Song of the Moon"	Various Artists	1:45
17.	"Assuage Grief Stone"	Various Artists	1:51
18.	"Vortex of Fate"	Various Artists	2:47
19.	"Revolt Plan"	Various Artists	3:24
20.	"Rebellion"	Various Artists	2:49
21.	"Bloody Precursor"	Various Artists	2:43
22.	"Flowery Moon"	Various Artists	2:49
23.	"Stick playing game"	Various Artists	3:11
24.	"Moonlight Mist"	Various Artists
25.	"Determination of the Sun"	Various Artists	3:20
26.	"Identity of Moon"	Various Artists	3:45
27.	"Pean of the Monarch"	Various Artists	2:13
28.	"The Sun embracing the Moon"	Various Artists	3:49

== Ratings ==
Ep.	Original broadcast date	Average audience share			
Ep.	Original broadcast date	AGB Nielsen		TNmS	
Ep.	Original broadcast date	Nationwide	Seoul	Nationwide	Seoul
1	January 4, 2012 (Note: According to AGB Nielsen Media Research, the premiere episode achieved a nationwide rating of 18 percent and by the third episode the series was ranked first with a nationwide rating of 23.2 percent in viewership, ahead of its rivals Take Care of Us, Captain on SBS and Wild Romance on KBS.)	18.0%	19.7%	15.0%	16.9%
2	January 5, 2012	19.9%	22.2%	17.3%	20.8%
3	January 11, 2012	23.2%	26.1%	19.4%	22.3%
4	January 12, 2012	23.4%	26.0%	20.6%	25.1%
5	January 18, 2012	24.9%	28.3%	21.6%	24.9%
6	January 19, 2012	29.3%	32.9%	25.9%	28.6%
7	January 25, 2012	29.7%	33.8%	25.5%	28.8%
8	January 26, 2012	31.7%	35.3%	26.2%	29.4%
9	February 1, 2012	34.5%	38.9%	28.4%	32.3%
10	February 2, 2012	37.1%	20.5%	30.5%	35.1%
11	February 8, 2012	37.1%	41.7%	34.3%	38.6%
12	February 9, 2012	37.1%	40.8%	33.7%	37.8%
13	February 15, 2012	38.4%	42.9%	34.6%	39.3%
14	February 16, 2012	37.6%	42.1%	37.2%	42.0%
15	February 22, 2012	39.1%	43.1%	37.7%	42.6%
16	February 23, 2012	41.3%	46.1%	39.8%	45.5%
17	February 29, 2012	36.0%	39.7%	33.3%	36.1%
18	March 1, 2012	41.2%	45.8%	20.7%	47.0%
19	March 14, 2012	38.7%	41.8%	38.9%	42.9%
20	March 15, 2012 (Note: The series finale recorded its highest ratings with a viewership of 42.2 percent nationwide, and an average of 45.8 percent in the Seoul National Capital Area.)	42.2%	45.8%	42.3%	46.5%
Average		33.0%	36.7%	30.1%	34.1%
Special	March 7, 2012	24.5%	26.9%	24.7%	26.0%
Special	March 8, 2012	19.2%	20.1%	19.8%	21.7%
In this table, the blue numbers represent the lowest ratings and the red numbers represent the highest ratings.

Ratings in the Philippines

It aired on GMA Network from August 13 to November 2, 2012, on weeknights at 5:45 PM PST. Each episode runs 45 minutes including commercial breaks. The entire series was dubbed in Filipino.

KANTAR MEDIA NATIONAL TV RATINGS (5:45 PM PST)
PILOT EPISODE	FINALE EPISODE	PEAK	AVERAGE	SOURCE
12.5%	16.5%	18.5%	No data	

== Awards and nominations ==
Year	Award	Category	Recipient	Result	Ref.
2012	48th Baeksang Arts Awards	Best Drama	Moon Embracing the Sun	Won	
2012	48th Baeksang Arts Awards	Best Director (TV)	Kim Do-hoon & Lee Seong-jun	Nominated	
2012	48th Baeksang Arts Awards	Best Actor (TV)	Kim Soo-hyun	Won	
2012	48th Baeksang Arts Awards	Best New Actor (TV)	Yeo Jin-goo	Nominated	
2012	48th Baeksang Arts Awards	Best New Actress (TV)	Kim Yoo-jung	Nominated	
2012	48th Baeksang Arts Awards	Most Popular Actor (TV)	Kim Soo-hyun	Nominated	
2012	48th Baeksang Arts Awards	Most Popular Actor (TV)	Jung Il-woo	Nominated	
2012	48th Baeksang Arts Awards	Most Popular Actor (TV)	Yeo Jin-goo	Nominated	
2012	48th Baeksang Arts Awards	Most Popular Actor (TV)	Yim Si-wan	Nominated	
2012	48th Baeksang Arts Awards	Most Popular Actress (TV)	Han Ga-in	Nominated	
2012	48th Baeksang Arts Awards	Most Popular Actress (TV)	Kim Yoo-jung	Nominated	
2012	6th Mnet 20's Choice Awards	20's Drama Star – Male	Kim Soo-hyun	Won	
2012	6th Mnet 20's Choice Awards	Upcoming 20's	Yeo Jin-goo	Won	
2012	6th Mnet 20's Choice Awards	Upcoming 20's	Kim Yoo-jung	Nominated	
2012	39th Korea Broadcasting Prize	Best Actor	Kim Soo-hyun	Won	
2012	18th Shanghai Television Festival; Magnolia Awards	Silver Award for Best Foreign TV Series	Moon Embracing the Sun	Won	
2012	7th Seoul International Drama Awards	Outstanding Korean Drama	Moon Embracing the Sun	Nominated	
2012	7th Seoul International Drama Awards	Outstanding Korean Actor	Kim Soo-hyun	Nominated	
2012	7th Seoul International Drama Awards	Outstanding Korean Actress	Han Ga-in	Nominated	
2012	14th Mnet Asian Music Awards	Best Original Soundtrack	Back in Time - Lyn	Nominated	
2012	4th Pierson Movie Festival	Best Child Actor	Yeo Jin-goo	Won	
2012	4th Pierson Movie Festival	Best Child Actress	Kim Yoo-jung	Won	
2012	5th Korea Drama Awards	Grand Prize	Kim Soo-hyun	Nominated	
2012	5th Korea Drama Awards	Best Drama	Moon Embracing the Sun	Nominated	
2012	5th Korea Drama Awards	Excellence Award, Actress	Jeon Mi-seon	Nominated	
2012	5th Korea Drama Awards	Best New Actor	Yim Si-wan	Nominated	
2012	5th Korea Drama Awards	Best Young Actor/Actress	Kim Yoo-jung	Nominated	
2012	5th Korea Drama Awards	Best Young Actor/Actress	Kim So-hyun	Nominated	
2012	5th Korea Drama Awards	Best Young Actor/Actress	Yeo Jin-goo	Nominated	
2012	5th Korea Drama Awards	Best Original Soundtrack	Back in Time - Lyn	Won	
2012	1st K-Drama Star Awards	Top Excellence Award, Actress	Han Ga-in	Nominated	
2012	1st K-Drama Star Awards	Excellence Award, Actor	Kim Soo-hyun	Won	
2012	1st K-Drama Star Awards	Acting Award, Actress	Jeon Mi-seon	Nominated	
2012	1st K-Drama Star Awards	Best Young Actress	Kim Yoo-jung	Won	
2012	25th Grimae Awards	Best Achievement for a Production, Drama category	Kim Sun-il, Jung Seung-woo	Won	
2012	MBC Drama Awards	Grand Prize	Kim Soo-hyun	Nominated	
2012	MBC Drama Awards	Grand Prize	Han Ga-in	Nominated	
2012	MBC Drama Awards	Drama of the Year	Moon Embracing the Sun	Won	
2012	MBC Drama Awards	Top Excellence Award, Actor in a Miniseries	Kim Soo-hyun	Won	
2012	MBC Drama Awards	Top Excellence Award, Actress in a Miniseries	Han Ga-in	Won	
2012	MBC Drama Awards	Excellence Award, Actor in a Miniseries	Jung Il-woo	Nominated	
2012	MBC Drama Awards	Golden Acting Award, Actor	Kim Eung-soo	Nominated	
2012	MBC Drama Awards	Golden Acting Award, Actor	Jung Eun-pyo	Nominated	
2012	MBC Drama Awards	Golden Acting Award, Actress	Yang Mi-kyung	Won	
2012	MBC Drama Awards	Golden Acting Award, Actress	Jeon Mi-seon	Nominated	
2012	MBC Drama Awards	Best New Actor	Yim Si-wan	Nominated	
2012	MBC Drama Awards	Best New Actress	Kim Min-seo	Nominated	
2012	MBC Drama Awards	Best New Actress	Nam Bo-ra	Nominated	
2012	MBC Drama Awards	Best Young Actor	Yeo Jin-goo	Won	
2012	MBC Drama Awards	Best Young Actor	Lee Min-ho	Nominated	
2012	MBC Drama Awards	Best Young Actress	Kim Yoo-jung	Won	
2012	MBC Drama Awards	Best Young Actress	Kim So-hyun	Won	
2012	MBC Drama Awards	Best Young Actress	Jin Ji-hee	Nominated	
2012	MBC Drama Awards	Writer of the Year	Jin Soo-wan	Won	
2012	MBC Drama Awards	Popularity Award	Kim Soo-hyun	Won	
2012	MBC Drama Awards	Popularity Award	Han Ga-in	Nominated	
2012	MBC Drama Awards	Popularity Award	Yeo Jin-goo	Nominated	
2012	MBC Drama Awards	Popularity Award	Jung Il-woo	Nominated	
2012	MBC Drama Awards	Popularity Award	Kim Yoo-jung	Nominated	
2012	MBC Drama Awards	Popularity Award	Kim So-hyun	Nominated	
2012	MBC Drama Awards	Popularity Award	Yim Si-wan	Nominated	
2012	MBC Drama Awards	Best Couple Award	Kim Soo-hyun & Han Ga-in	Nominated	
2012	MBC Drama Awards	Best Couple Award	Kim Soo-hyun & Jung Eun-pyo	Nominated	
2012	MBC Drama Awards	Best Couple Award	Yeo Jin-goo & Kim Yoo-jung	Nominated	
2013	46th WorldFest-Houston	Special Jury Award	Moon Embracing the Sun	Won	

== Musical theatre ==
A stage musical adaptation was performed at the Seoul Arts Center from July 6 to 31, 2013, with succeeding runs in 2014. Kim Da-hyun, Jeon Dong-seok and Cho Kyu-hyun alternated as Lee Hwon, and Jeon Mi-do, Ahn Shi-ha, Lina, Jung Jae-eun and Seohyun alternated as Yeon-woo.
