= Yedda Chen =

Chinese actress

- Born: February 4, 1984 (age 42); Zhoushan, Zhejiang
- Occupations: Actress, Model
- Height: 1.73 m (5 ft 8 in)

Yedda Chen 陈彦妃(born February 4, 1984) is a Chinese actress and model.

== Life and education ==
She was born in Zhoushan County in Zhejiang Province. She studied piano and ballet at school. She stands at 173 cm and weighs 48 kg. She started her career as a model. She has a modest early TV acting career. She graduated from Xie Jin of Shanghai Normal University College of film and Television Arts.

== TV series ==
Television
Year	Title	Role	Notes
2003	Star Dream 星梦缘	Lin Sitong	
2006	King Qian in Wuyue	Wu Ziye	
2008	Justice Bao		
2010	GO LALA GO 杜拉拉升职记	Hellen	
2010	Shanghai Shanghai		
2010	Princess single blind date in mind 单身公主相亲记	Bamei	
2011	My Splendid life 我的灿烂人生	Xia Qing tian	
2013	Fiancee 未婚妻	Xiao Lu	
2013	Our Love 爱的创可贴	Zhong KeKe	
2017	Midnight Diner	Customer	
