= Dr. Kkang =

- Promotional poster
- Also known as: Dr. Gang; Doctor Kang
- Hangul: 닥터 깽
- RR: Dakteo Kkaeng
- MR: Takt'ŏ Kkaeng
- Genre: Romance; Drama
- Written by: Kim Kyu-wan
- Directed by: Park Sung-soo
- Starring: Yang Dong-geun; Han Ga-in; Lee Jong-hyuk
- Country of origin: South Korea
- Original language: Korean
- No. of episodes: 16

Production
- Executive producer: Lee Chang-sub
- Running time: 60 minutes
- Production company: Sidus FNH

Original release
- Network: Munhwa Broadcasting Corporation
- Release: April 5 – May 25, 2006

Dr. Kkang (Korean: 닥터 깽) is a 2006 South Korean television series starring Yang Dong-geun, Han Ga-in and Lee Jong-hyuk. It aired on MBC from April 5 to May 25, 2006, on Wednesdays and Thursdays at 21:55 for 16 episodes.

== Plot ==
When a gangster (kkangpae) pretends to be a doctor in order to hide from the mob he left behind, he doesn't realize that this innocent deception will set him on the path towards love and redemption. Kang Dal-go, a mid-level member of a Busan gang, gets kicked out of the gang after being investigated by the police and is forced to flee for his life. Hiding out in Seoul, he gets hired as a doctor at a nearby hospital, where he quickly clashes with Kim Yoo-na, a dedicated and outspoken doctor. Gradually, however, the former gang member and the beautiful physician begin to fall in love in the midst of their clashes, to the dismay of prosecutor Seok Hee-jung, who is also pursuing Yoo-na. Dal-go may want to start a new life, but it's uncertain if his past will allow him to do so, and what Yoo-na's reaction will be once she discovers the truth.

== Cast ==
- Yang Dong-geun as Kang Dal-go
- Han Ga-in as Dr. Kim Yoo-na
- Lee Jong-hyuk as Prosecutor Seok Hee-jung
- Kim Hye-ok as Yeon-ji, Dal-go's mother
- Kim Hak-chul as Song Kwang-ho, Shark Fin gang boss
- Kim Jung-tae as Jo Jang-shik, Shark Fin gangster
- Park Si-eun as Lee Hye-young, Yoo-na's sister-in-law
- Ha Seok-jin as Kim Jin-gyu, Yoo-na's brother
- Oh Kwang-rok as Dr. Bong
- Jo Mi-ryung as Nurse Seo
- Choi Jae-won as Detective Kim, Yoo-na's brother and Hye-young's husband
- Jung Gyu-woon as Detective Bae
- Yoo Tae-sung as Taek-soo
- Kim Soo-kyum as Soon-ae
- Kim Ha-kyun as Prosecutor Hwang
- Kim Chul-ki as Do Jin-shik, Dal-go's lawyer
- Won Tae-hee as a junior high school student
- Choi Beom-ho
