= Dennis Oh =

American actor and model (born 1981)

- Born: Dennis Joseph O'Neil; August 29, 1981 (age 45); Los Angeles, California, U.S.
- Other name: Dennis O'Neil
- Citizenship: United States; South Korea
- Education: Savannah College of Art and Design
- Occupations: Actor; model
- Years active: 2001–present

Dennis Joseph O'Neil (born August 29, 1981), known professionally as Dennis Oh, is an American actor and model of Korean descent. He is best known for his starring role as Han Yoo-Il on MBC's Sweet Spy.

== Filmography ==
=== Films ===
Film
Year	Title	Role	Notes
2011	Somebody to Love		
2014	Hype Nation 3D	Tony Kang	
2015	East of Main Street: Taking the Lea	Himself	Documentary
2016	Papa	Jason Chen	
2016	Good Night		Credited as Dennis Joseph O'Neil
2016	Tian ma	Johnny Malone	
2019	Pegasus: On the Brink		

=== Television ===
Film
Year	Title	Role	Notes
2005-2006	Sweet Spy	Han Yoo-Il	
2007	Witch Yoo Hee	Johnny Kruger	Also known as Witch Amusement
2008	East of Eden	Mike Packard	
2009	The Forgotten	Handsome Man	Credited as Dennis O'Neil; Episode 8: "Prisoner Jane"
2010	Melrose Place	Michael Hoover	Episode 15: "Mulholland"
2013	Fiancee	Ma Yao Zu	
2015	Tao Hua Yun	Lu Yao Wei	English title: Cupid Above
2017	The Perfect Wedding	Zhao Dan Qiao	
2018	NCIS: New Orleans	Kurt Young	Season 4, episode 19: "High Stakes"
2018	Get Christie Love	Sang Kim	TV movie
2019	The Next Top Star	Luo Cheng	
2022	Big Shot	Scott Park	Season 2, episode 10: "Moving On"
2022	The Good Doctor	Mick	Season 6, episode 5: "Growth Opportunities"
