= Circle House =

South Korean television show

- Hangul: 써클 하우스
- RR: Sseokeul hauseu
- MR: Ssŏk'ŭl hausŭ
- Genre: Reality show
- Written by: Lee Yu-jeong; Lim Jeong-mi; Kim Ga-hee; Kim So-young; Noh Hyang-i; Hwang Seo-jin; Choi Su-jeong; Ahn Jin-hee; Jo Jae-young; Kim Min-jung; Shin Ji-yeon
- Directed by: Lee Se-young; Han Bi-in; Jeong Jeong-won; Cha Young-hoon; Cho Eun-jae; Choi Ji-yoon
- Starring: Oh Eun-young (professor); Lee Seung-gi; Han Ga-in; Noh Hong-chul; Leejung Lee
- Country of origin: South Korea
- Original language: Korean
- No. of episodes: 10

Production
- Production location: South Korea

Original release
- Network: SBS
- Release: 24 February – 28 April 2022

Circle House (Korean: 써클 하우스) is a South Korean television healing talk show that aired every Thursday at 21:00 (KST) on SBS TV from February 24 to April 28, 2022.

== Overview ==
Circle House is a new year special program by SBS, which premiered on Thursday, February 24, 2022. The program is a healing talk show that frankly shares the common distress experienced by the MZ generation in South Korea, and explores solutions together with applicants. The warmth and fun brought by the "magic combination" is anticipated to soothe the minds of the frustrated and exhausted youth living in the hustle and bustle.

== Cast ==
Cast Member	Occupation	Introduction
Oh Eun-young (professor)	Psychiatrist, Professor	Dr. Oh stood up to soothe the pain of "teenage adults" in their twenties and thirties.
Lee Seung-gi	Singer, Actor, Entertainer	Lee Seung Gi, who turned from the younger brother of the nation to the MC of the nation, genuinely speaks for the youth of this era with his unique sincerity.
Han Ga-in	Actress	Actress Han Ga-in, who is going to participate in a variety show for the first time since her debut, showed her appearance as an "informal consultant in the entertainment industry" and shared her innermost feelings with "teenage adults".
Noh Hong-chul	Entertainer	As a symbol of eternal youth, he deeply empathizes with the growing pains experienced by teenage adults, and gives his wholehearted support.
Leejung Lee	Dancer	The legendary dancer, Lee Jung, as the representative of "Recent Generation", will continue to convey messages of resonance and affirmation to teenage adults.

== Ratings ==
In the ratings below, the lowest rating for the show will be in blue and the highest rating for the show will be in red.

Ep. #	Broadcast Date	Nielsen Korea (Nationwide)
1	February 24, 2022	3.0%
2	March 3, 2022	2.2%
3	March 10, 2022	2.7%
4	March 17, 2022	3.2%
5	March 24, 2022	2.9%
6	March 31, 2022	3.4%
7	April 7, 2022	3.7%
8	April 14, 2022	3.3%
9	April 21, 2022	3.3%
10	April 28, 2022	3.7%
