= Baby Faced Beauty =

2011 South Korean television series

- Promotional poster
- Hangul: 동안미녀
- Hanja: 童顏美女
- RR: Dongan minyeo
- MR: Tongan minyŏ
- Genre: Romance; Comedy
- Written by: Jung Do-yoon; Oh Seon-hyung
- Directed by: Lee Jin-seo; Lee So-yeon
- Starring: Jang Na-ra; Choi Daniel; Ryu Jin; Kim Min-seo
- Country of origin: South Korea
- No. of episodes: 20

Production
- Executive producer: Lee Gun-joon
- Producer: Hong Suk-goo
- Running time: Mondays and Tuesdays at 21:55 (KST)
- Production company: AStory

Original release
- Network: Korean Broadcasting System
- Release: 2 May – 5 July 2011

Baby Faced Beauty (Korean: 동안미녀) is a 2011 South Korean television series starring Jang Na-ra, Choi Daniel, Ryu Jin, and Kim Min-seo. It aired on KBS2 from May 2 to July 5, 2011 on Mondays and Tuesdays at 21:55 for 20 episodes. The drama is about an aspiring 34-year-old fashion designer who fakes her age to get a job in a fashion company.

The romantic comedy had kicked off with a viewership rating of around 6 percent, but gradually rose and surpassed the 15 percent mark. Originally slated for 18 episodes, it was extended by 2 more episodes due to its popularity. It ranked number one in its primetime timeslot for five consecutive weeks.

== Synopsis ==
34-year-old So-young (Jang Na-ra), has lackluster education background (a mere high school degree) and bad credit history (due to her younger, spendthrift sister). After getting fired from a fabric factory she worked at for 14 years, she has trouble finding a new job. When her younger sister, So-jin (Oh Yeon-seo), rejects the offer of working at a fashion design company called "The Style", So-young decides to take her sister's place by pretending to be 10 years younger. Other than the specialty of turning ordinary materials into something special, her advantage is her babyface. In the workplace, she encounters Seung-il (Ryu Jin), the company president who eyes her with interest, and Jin-wook (Choi Daniel), a marketing director who falls in love with her without knowing that she is seven years older than him.

== Cast ==
=== Main ===
- Jang Na-ra as Lee So-young
- Choi Daniel as Choi Jin-wook
- Ryu Jin as Ji Seung-il
- Kim Min-seo as Kang Yoon-seo

=== Supporting ===
The Style Design Company

- Hong Rok-gi as Manager Jang Ki-hong
- Son Hwa-ryung as Assistant Manager Jang Mi-soon
- Yoo Yun-ji as Park Na-ra
- Kim Mi-kyung as Director Baek
- Na Young-hee as Managing Director Hyun Ji-sook
- Yoo Tae-woong as Team Leader Kim Joon-soo

=== Extended ===
- Oh Yeon-seo as Lee So-jin
- Hyun Young as Ji Joo-hee
- Yoon Hee-seok as Noh Yong-joon, So-young's uncle
- Ahn Seo-hyun as Ji Hyun-yi
- Kim Hye-ok as Jung-ok, So-young's mother
- Kim Kyu-chul as So-young's father
- Kim Bo-yoon as Kwon Hye-jung
- Park Chul-min as Sun-nam
- Lee Seung-hyung as Director Ahn Jung-nam
- Yoon Joo-sang as Jin-wook's father
- Geum Ho-suk as Min-ki
- Clara Lee (Note: Credited as Lee Sung-min.) as Chae Seul-ah
- Bang Min-ah as Hye-mi (cameo, ep 1 & 6)
- Jeon So-min as Lee Jin-hee (cameo)
- Park Sung-kwang (cameo)
- Jung Joo-eun

== Ratings ==
Episode #	Original broadcast date	Average audience share			
Episode #	Original broadcast date	TNmS Ratings		AGB Nielsen	
Episode #	Original broadcast date	Nationwide	Seoul National Capital Area	Nationwide	Seoul National Capital Area
1	2 May 2011	5.8%	6.5%	6.1%	6.8%
2	3 May 2011	6.8%	7.3%	6.3%	7.0%
3	9 May 2011	9.5%	10.8%	9.0%	10.0%
4	10 May 2011	8.9%	9.9%	9.6%	10.6%
5	16 May 2011	10.3%	11.8%	10.6%	11.4%
6	17 May 2011	12.0%	13.5%	11.9%	12.4%
7	23 May 2011	10.5%	12.1%	12.1%	13.1%
8	24 May 2011	12.0%	14.2%	12.8%	14.1%
9	30 May 2011	10.8%	11.9%	11.0%	12.2%
10	31 May 2011	12.0%	13.5%	12.5%	13.9%
11	6 June 2011	13.3%	15.2%	13.4%	15..1%
12	7 June 2011	15.3%	16.5%	15.5%	17.0%
13	13 June 2011	15.2%	17.1%	15.2%	16.4%
14	14 June 2011	14.4%	16.4%	15.8%	17.5%
15	20 June 2011	15.1%	18.0%	14.4%	15.5%
16	21 June 2011	13.8%	15.7%	14.6%	15.9%
17	27 June 2011	14.3%	15.9%	14.0%	14.7%
18	28 June 2011	14.9%	16.9%	15.1%	15.8%
19	4 July 2011	15.1%	16.3%	15.9%	16.7%
20	5 July 2011	16.6%	18.1%	16.2%	16.5%
Average		12.3%	13.9%	12.6%	13.6%

== Awards ==
=== 2011 KBS Drama Awards ===
- Excellence Award, Actress in a Miniseries – Jang Na-ra
- Excellence Award, Actor in a Miniseries – Choi Daniel

== International broadcast ==
- It aired on Japanese cable channel KNTV from November 18, 2011 to January 27, 2012, with reruns on cable channel LaLaTV beginning June 25, 2014.
- It aired on Thailand on Workpoint TV beginning September 24, 2013.
