= Fiancee (TV series) =

- Also known as: 未婚妻
- Genre: Drama; Romance; Family
- Starring: Ma Si Chun; Dennis Oh
- Country of origin: China
- Original language: Mandarin
- No. of episodes: 36

Original release
- Network: Hunan TV
- Release: October 23 – November 24, 2013

Fiancée (simplified Chinese: 未婚妻; Pinyin: wei hun qi) is a 2013 Chinese television drama starring Ma Si Chun as Lan Xiao Yi and Dennis Oh as Ma Yao Zu.

== Synopsis ==
This drama was adapted from the novel Fulfill Your Own Blue Sky (成全了自己的碧海蓝天) by Lan Xiaoxi.

Lan Xiao Yi, played by Ma Si Chun, leaves her job in Hangzhou to follow her boyfriend Tian Fei (Yuan Cheng Jie) to Shanghai. In Shanghai, Xiao Yi struggles to find a job. She finds many low-paying jobs before working at Teng Fei but is happy to be with Tian Fei. At the same time, Tian Fei's colleague Xiao Lu (Yedda Chen), a new college graduate, has fallen in love with Tian Fei and is determined be with him. Wealthy bachelor Ma Yao Zu/ Hou Zi (Dennis Oh) is the son of the director of Teng Fei, and is Xiao Yi's boss. Although they met on a bad note and they argue continually, he cares for her and look out for her.

As emotions become more tangled, Xiao Lu fakes a pregnancy to force Tian Fei to marry her. Tian Fei makes a promise to Xiao Yi that he will take two years to work out the situation and then return to her. Xiao Yi naively believes him and waits for the two years to pass, but then finds out that she is pregnant with Tian Fei's baby. After half a year, finding out that Tian Fei will marry Xiao Lu, Xiao Yi has had enough of waiting for Tian Fei. Hou Zi confesses his feelings for Xiao Yi but she rejects him, citing her current situation as preventing them from being together.

Two years later, Xiao Yi has given birth to a girl, Lan Miao Miao, played by Fatimah, and is trying to earn enough money to buy her own apartment in Shanghai. She attempts to take care of her daughter alone while working full-time. By accident, she meets Hou Zi (Dennis Oh) again, but he's engaged to another girl, Shen Xue. Although he does not love her, he had initially lost hope of ever finding Xiao Yi before suddenly seeing her again. Tian Fei and Xiao Lu have also married and Tian Fei now has a car, a house, and a reliable job. But Tian Fei's and Xiao Lu's relationship falls apart after Tian Fei learns that Xiao Lu lied about her pregnancy. Although they don't hit if off at first, Hou Zi cares for Xiao Yi and Miao Miao, taking care of Xiao Yi, Miao Miao and her parents. Although she initially has reservations about dating him because of her situation, they slowly begin to fall in love with each other as he proves to be a reliable and caring man who appears whenever she needs any help.

One day, a drunk Tian Fei calls Xiao Yi, asking to meet up, although she expresses no interest in giving him a second chance. Following a series of encounters, Tian Fei learns that Xiao Yi has a child. Suspecting that it is his, he confronts Xiao Yi, but she refuses, and Hou Zi continues to look out for her, acting as a father figure for Miao Miao. After checking the DNA results, Tian Fei confirms that Miao Miao is his daughter. Tian Fei wants to rekindle their relationship again, but Xiao Yi is unwilling. After Tian Fei and his mother express their desire to take Miao Miao, Hou Zi attempts to stop them, even secretly offering Tian Fei a large sum of money to get him to leave her and her family alone.

After a car accident, Tian Fei is left in a comatose state. Xiao Yi and Miao Miao go to see Tian Fei daily, and they try to help him wake up and restore his memories. Although Hou Zi hates Tian Fei, he expresses that Xiao Yi should let him see his daughter, and for her to know her biological father, for Miao Miao's sake. Afterwards, Xiao Yi advises Xiao Lu and Tian Fei to try to accept and love each other. Finally able to move on, Xiao Yi and Hou Zi finally marry and live together happily with their daughter Miao Miao.

== Cast ==
- Dennis Oh as Ma Yao Zu (马耀祖) / Hou Zi (猴子)
- Ma Si Chun as Lan Xiao Yi (蓝小依)
- Bao Tian Yuan as Lan Miao Miao (蓝妙妙) (Xiao Yi and Tian Fei's daughter)
- Yuan Cheng Jie (袁成杰) as Tian Fei (田飞)
- Yedda Chen as Lu Lu (陆露) (Tian Fei's wife)
- Zheng Si Ren (郑斯仁) as Ah Wen (阿文)
- Ai Li Ya (艾丽娅) as Tian Fei's mother
- Wang Zhi Hua as Lu Lu's father
- Wang Xiao Hong (王小红) as Lu Lu's mother
- Li Guo Liang (李国梁) as Xiao Yi's father
- Zhang Zhi Hua as Xiao Yi's mother
- Juan Zi as Manager Wang
- Xi Man Ning as Hou Zi's mother
- Wang Zhong Xin (王仲欣) as Shen Xue, Hou Zi's ex-fiancée
- Liu Tian Yue as Hou Zi's elder sister
- Zhang Yang (章扬) as Song Chun Chun (宋春春)

== Production ==
- Original writing: novel "Cheng Quan Zi Ji De Bi Hai Lan Tian" (成全了自己的碧海蓝天) by Lan Xiaoxi (蓝小汐)
- Producer: Xu Yun (徐云)
- Director: Chen Wei-ling
- Screenwriter: Lan Xiao Xi (蓝小汐)

== Music ==
- Opening theme song: Fang Xin Jiao Gei Wo Ai Qing (放心交给我爱情) by Yuan Cheng Jie (袁成杰)
- Ending theme song: Yi Yang Ai Zhe Ni 一样爱着你 Still Loving You by BY2
- Insert songs:
  - Qi Tian Zhui Dao Ni (七天追到你) by Rynn Lim
  - Hai Shi Ai Zhe Ta (还是爱着他) Still Loving Him by Zhang Jing (张婧)
  - Ai De Shuang Zhong Mo Li (爱的双重魔力) by BY2
  - You Na Me Nan Ma? (有那么难吗?) by Zhang Jing (张婧)
