= Kim Hye-ok =

South Korean actress (born 1958)

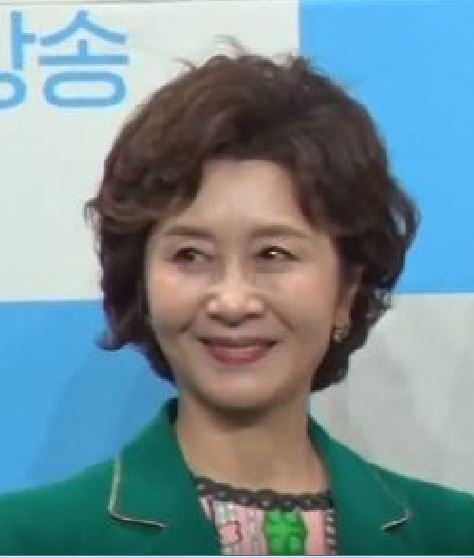
- Kim in April 2019
- Born: May 9, 1958 (age 68); Seoul, South Korea
- Education: Seoul Institute of the Arts – theater and film Chung-Ang University – theater and film Chung-Ang University Graduate School of Mass Communication – master's degree in journalism
- Occupation: Actress
- Years active: 1980–present

Korean name
- Hangul: 김혜옥
- Hanja: 金惠玉
- RR: Gim Hyeok
- MR: Kim Hyeok

Kim Hye-ok (Korean: 김혜옥; born May 9, 1958) is a South Korean actress.

== Filmography ==
=== Film ===
Year	Title	Role	Notes	Ref.
1989	Today's Woman			
1991	Theresa's Lover	Wife		
1992	Our Twisted Hero	Han Byeong-tae's mother		
1993	Love Is Oh Yeah!	Byeong-soo's mother		
1993	Two Cops	Detective Jo's wife		
2003	My Tutor Friend	Kim Ji-hoon's mother		
2003	Show Show Show	San-hae's mother		
2003	Spring Breeze	Madam Hong		
2004	My Little Bride	Park Sang-min's mother		
2005	This Charming Girl	Jeong-hae's mother		
2005	Green Chair	Seo Hyun's mother		
2005	Sa-kwa	Sang-hoon's relative from his hometown		
2006	Family Ties	Mae-ja		
2006	Ad-lib Night	Myung-eun's mother		
2006	Old Miss Diary the Movie	Hye-ok		
2007	Two Faces of My Girlfriend	Gu-chang's mother		
2008	Lovers of Six Years	Lee Da-jin's mother		
2008	Do Re Mi Fa So La Ti Do	Yoon Jung-won's mother		
2008	My Dear Enemy	Mrs. Han		
2009	Kill Me	Yoon Yeo-kyung		
2009	Girlfriends	Song-yi's mother		
2010	Twilight Gangsters	Gong Shin-ja		
2011	Come Rain, Come Shine	Woman's mother on the phone	(voice)	
2011	Sunny	Im Na-mi's mother		
2016	A Man and a Woman	Moon-joo's mother		
2016	The Table	Sook-hee		
2017	One Day	Sun-hwa's mother		
2019	Cheer Up, Mr. Lee	Saet-byul's grandmother		
2022	Life Is Beautiful	Jin-bong's mother	Special appearance	

=== Television series ===
Year	Title	Role	Notes	Ref.
1980	Lifetime in the Country	Gi-hong's wife		
1987	Daughter	Wife		
1988	The Last Idol			
1991	Lethe's Song			
1992	Time and Tears			
1995	Fourth Republic	Kim Myo-chun		
1995	Always Blue Hearts	Kyung-hwa's mother		
1996	Im Kkeok-jeong	Im Kkeokjeong's mother		
1996	Hometown of Legends: "Ssangtaebawi"			
1996	Hometown of Legends: "Yaho"			
1997	Generation of Sensibility	Mi-seon's mother		
1999	The Clinic for Married Couples: Love and War		Cameo	
2001	Lovers	Fashion shop owner Kim Hye-ok		
2003	Snowman	Hospital transplant coordinator		
2003	Garden of Eve	Baek Ji-ae's mother		
2003	Breathless	Shin Moo-chul's mother		
2004	Something Happened in Bali	Choi Young-joo's mother		
2004	Beautiful Temptation	Min Hye-ok		
2004	Lotus Flower Fairy	Kim Moo-bin's mother		
2004	I'm Sorry, I Love You	Jang Hye-sook		
2004	Old Miss Diary	Small granny 2		
2005	Hong Kong Express	Ms. Min		
2005	Wonderful Life	Pyo Jae-kyung		
2005	The Hard Goodbye	Editor		
2005	Autumn Shower	Nam Kyung-mi		
2005	Let's Go to the Beach	Mrs. Hwang		
2005	Bizarre Bunch	Choi Yoo-jung		
2005	MBC Best Theater: "Garibong Ocean's Eleven"	Mrs. Jang	one act-drama	
2006	Wolf	Madam Han Kyung-shil		
2006	Dr. Kkang	Yeon-ji		
2006	Love Truly	First Lady Oh Young-sil		
2006	Over the Rainbow	Lee Mi-ja		
2006	Common Single	Yoon Jung-shim		
2006	Fugitive Lee Doo-yong	Kim Bok-soon		
2006	90 Days, Time to Love	Hyun Ji-seok's mother		
2006	Love and Hate	Oh Geum-ja		
2006	Miracle	Lee Mi-so's fellow alumna		
2007	Salt Doll	Kang Ji-seok's mother		
2007	Flowers for My Life	Park Cho-sun		
2007	Several Questions That Make Us Happy	Kyung-sook		
2007	Capital Scandal	Ueda Sachiko		
2007	Ground Zero	Han Yoo-jin's mother		
2007	Daughters-in-Law	Lee Myung-hee		
2007	Likeable or Not	Lee Jong-soon		
2008	Formidable Rivals	Widow Oh Mi-ja		
2008	You Stole My Heart	Son Jeom-soon		
2008	My Sweet Seoul	Oh Eun-soo's mother		
2008	My Life's Golden Age	Bok Mi-ja		
2008	White Lie	Na Jin-soon		
2009	My Too Perfect Sons	Ahn Moon-sook		
2009	Two Wives	Song Ji-ho's mother		
2009	Heading to the Ground	Oh Yeon-yi's mother		
2009	Don't Hesitate	Cha Young-ran		
2010	Bad Guy	Mrs. Shin		
2010	The Scarlet Letter	Jung Soon-im		
2010	KBS Drama Special: "Stone"	Jung Myung-ja	one act-drama	
2010	It's Okay, Daddy's Girl	Heo Sook-hee		
2011	Royal Family	Seo Soon-ae		
2011	All My Love for You	Kim Hye-ok/Kim Gab-sun		
2011	Baby Faced Beauty	Jung-ok		
2011	Scent of a Woman	Kim Soon-jung		
2011	KBS Drama Special: "Daughters of Bilitis Club"	Choi Hyang-ja	one act-drama	
2011	My One and Only	Hong In-sook		
2011	Saving Mrs. Go Bong-shil	Park Won-sook		
2012	Dr. Jin	Hong Young-rae's mother		
2012	Seoyoung, My Daughter	Cha Ji-sun		
2012	Ugly Cake	Lee Jung-ja		
2012	Here Comes Mr. Oh	Go Sung-sil		
2013	All About My Romance	Na Young-sook		
2013	Two Weeks	Jo Seo-hee		
2013	KBS Drama Special: "Yeon-woo's Summer"	Park Soon-im		
2013	Melody of Love	Yoo Jin-soon		
2014	Can We Fall in Love, Again?	Jung Soon-ok		
2014	Jang Bo-ri Is Here!	In-hwa		
2014	Doctor Stranger			
2014	Discovery of Love	Shin Yoon-hee		
2014	Love & Secret	Oh Myung-hwa		
2015	The Producers	Lee Hoo-nam		
2015	A Daughter Just Like You	Hong Ae-ja		
2016	Listen to Love		Cameo	
2016	Father, I'll Take Care of You	Moon Jeong-Ae		
2016	Let's Make a New Start	Kim Ha-na		
2017	Manhole	Yoon Kkeut-soon		
2017	Strong Family	Mrs. Jo		
2017	My Golden Life	Yang Mi-jung		
2018	What's Wrong with Secretary Kim	Madame Choi		
2018	Your Honor	Im Geum-mi		
2019	Home for Summer	Na Yeong-sim		
2020	Oh My Baby	Lee Ok-ran		
2022	Through the Darkness	Park Young-shin		
2022	It's Beautiful Now	Han Kyeong-ae		
2023	The Real Has Come!	Kang Bong-nim		

== Awards and nominations ==
Year	Award	Category	Nominated work	Result
1982	18th Baeksang Arts Awards	Best New Actress in Theater		Won
1987	Director's Group Awards	Excellence Award		Won
2006	47th Thessaloniki International Film Festival	Best Actress	Family Ties	Won
2006	MBC Drama Awards	Special Acting Award, Veteran Actress	Over the Rainbow	Won
2006	KBS Drama Awards	Best Supporting Actress	Bizarre Bunch	Nominated
2007	44th Grand Bell Awards	Best Supporting Actress	Family Ties	Nominated
2007	SBS Drama Awards	Best Supporting Actress in a Serial Drama	Love and Hate	Nominated
2007	KBS Drama Awards	Best Supporting Actress	Likeable or Not, The Golden Age of Daughters-in-Law	Won
2009	SBS Drama Awards	Best Supporting Actress in a Serial Drama	Don't Hesitate	Nominated
2009	KBS Drama Awards	Best Supporting Actress	My Too Perfect Sons	Nominated
2010	SBS Drama Awards	Best Supporting Actress in a Drama Special	Bad Guy	Nominated
2011	SBS Drama Awards	Special Acting Award, Actress in a Weekend Drama	Scent of a Woman	Won
2014	MBC Drama Awards	Golden Acting Award, Actress	Jang Bo-ri is Here!	Won
