= Han Ga-in =

South Korean actress and model (born 1982)

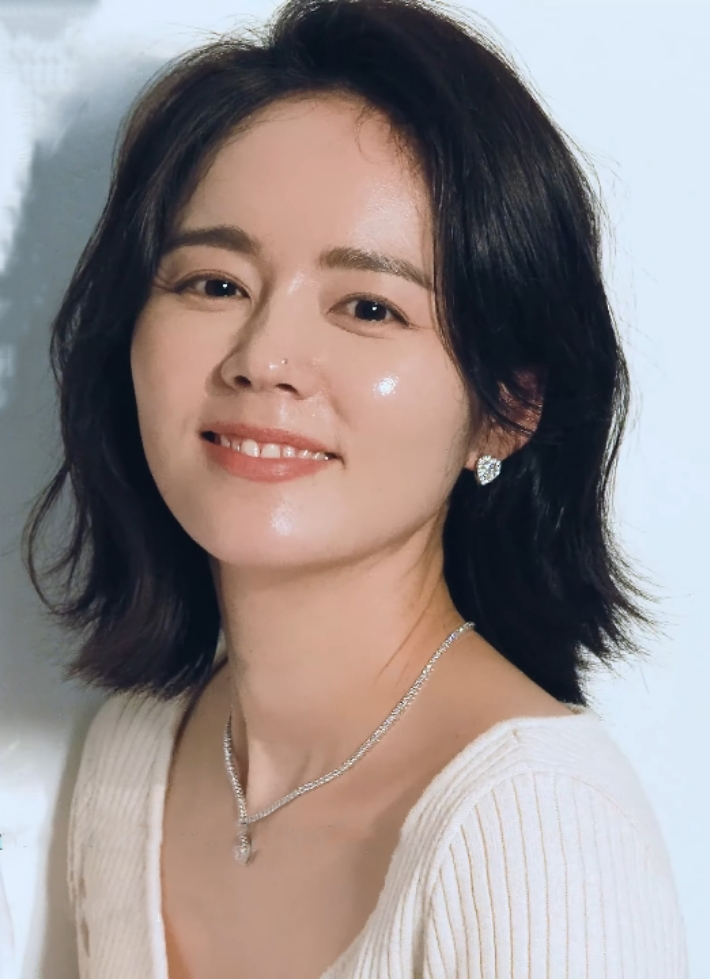
- Han in May 2024
- Born: Kim Hyun-joo; 1982 (age 43–44); Seoul, South Korea
- Education: Kyung Hee University (BSc. HCM)
- Occupations: Actress; model
- Years active: 2002–present
- Agent: BH Entertainment
- Spouse: Yeon Jung-hoon (m. 2005)
- Children: 2

Korean name
- Hangul: 김현주
- RR: Gim Hyeonju
- MR: Kim Hyŏnju

Stage name
- Hangul: 한가인
- RR: Han Gain
- MR: Han Kain

Kim Hyun-joo (Korean: 김현주), better known by the stage name Han Ga-in (한가인), is a South Korean actress and model. She starred in television series Yellow Handkerchief and Terms of Endearment early in her career, and became a sought-after model in commercials. Her projects in 2012 were hugely successful, with her period drama Moon Embracing the Sun topping the TV ratings chart, and her film Architecture 101 becoming a box office hit.

== Early life and education ==
Han Ga-in was born as Kim Hyun-joo. She attended Seoul Gusan Elementary School (서울구산초등학교), Sunjung Middle School (선정중학교) and Baehwa Girls' High School (배화여자고등학교). She excelled academically and scored 384 points out of 400 points on the South Korean University entrance examinations. On December 22, 2000, while attending high school, Han participated in KBS1 quiz show Challenge Golden Bell and reached the 34th stage. She studied hospitality management at Kyung Hee University; after entering the entertainment industry, she continued her studies part-time and graduated in 2007.

== Career ==
As a high school student, Han Ga-in appeared on KBS's TV show called The Golden Bell Challenge (도전! 골든벨) and was also captured in footage of interviews with other students. Entertainment executives spotted her in the news clip and immediately went to her school to offer her a part. She decided to use her current stage name as she shares a birth name with another actress who debuted earlier than her.

Han debuted in an Asiana Airlines commercial in 2002, and was cast in the KBS2 drama Sunshine Hunting. She subsequently appeared in a supporting role in the popular daily drama Yellow Handkerchief and made her big-screen debut in Once Upon a Time in High School. In 2004, she took on the leading role in Terms of Endearment and won an Excellence award at the KBS Drama Awards.

In 2005, Han acted in Super Rookie, a satire on Korea's corporate culture and unemployment among the country's younger generation. It drew solid viewership ratings in the 20% range, and won Han the Excellence Award at the MBC Drama Awards. The drama was also reportedly well received by Japanese viewers and contributed to Han's popularity in the country. This was followed by leading roles in Dr. Kkang and Witch Yoo Hee. In the latter drama, Han sported a bob cut as she portrayed a career woman who cared about her appearance and job rather than relationships.

After Witch Yoo Hee wrapped in 2007, Han publicly criticized the director and writers for the drama's poor quality. She went on a three-year hiatus afterwards, merely starring in advertisements. Han struggled to shake the perception that she was only a lovely face and not a professional actor, having only portrayed stereotypical characters, even though she quickly rose to the top of the TV advertising industry's most sought-after faces list.

Han at the Bad Guy production sneak preview in 2010.

Mainly categorized as a "CF star," Han wanted to change that misconception with her comeback in 2010. In Bad Guy, she attempted to transform her image as a pure and innocent girl to a materialistic woman who dreams of climbing the social ladder at the expense of others.

2012 was the most successful year of Han's career yet. She first starred in period drama, Moon Embracing the Sun, in which she played the heroine, an amnesiac noblewoman-turned-shaman. The drama not only ranked number one in its time slot throughout its run but achieved a peak recorded viewer rating of 42.2%, thereby earning "national drama" status. This was followed by a leading role in romantic film Architecture 101, which got rave reviews and set a new box-office record as the highest-grossing Korean melodrama. Han also appeared on episode 87 of the popular variety show, Running Man.

Han at the Seoul production sneak preview of Architecture 101 in 2012.

Han was managed by J. One Plus Entertainment from 2009 to 2011, and when her contract expired, she signed with Lee Byung-hun's agency, BH Entertainment in December 2012.

In 2018, Han returned to the small screen after six years with mystery thriller Mistress.

In February 2022, 4 years after Mistress, Han returned to television as a host of SBS talk show Circle House. In April 2022, she made a guest appearance in KBS2 reality-variety show 2 Days & 1 Night, in which her husband Yeon Jung-hoon is a fixed cast member.

In September 2024, Han launched the YouTube channel 자유부인 한가인, where she shares videos featuring various aspects of her personal life and experiences. The channel has documented her participation in a variety of activities and challenges, including makeup transformations and other lifestyle-oriented content.

== Personal life ==
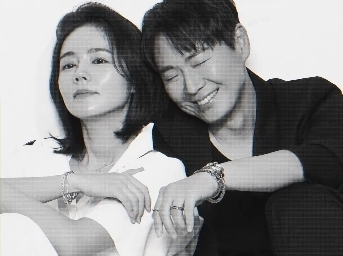
Han with her husband Yeon Jung-hoon for a fashion photoshoot in 2024

Han married actor Yeon Jung-hoon on April 26, 2005; they first met as co-stars in the 2003 daily drama Yellow Handkerchief. Their wedding attracted much media attention due to the rarity of actresses marrying in their early twenties, at the prime of their careers. Han had a miscarriage in 2014, and later gave birth to a daughter on April 13, 2016. On May 13, 2019, she gave birth to a son.

== Filmography ==
=== Film ===
Year	Title	Role
2004	Once Upon a Time in High School	Eun-joo
2012	Architecture 101	Yang Seo-yeon

=== Television series ===
Year	Title	Role
2002	Sunshine Hunting	Joo-Young
2003	Yellow Handkerchief	Jo Sun-joo
2004	Terms of Endearment	Kang Eun-pah
2005	Super Rookie	Lee Mi-ok
2006	Dr. Kkang	Kim Yoo-na
2007	Witch Yoo Hee	Ma Yoo-hee
2010	Bad Guy	Moon Jae-in
2012	Moon Embracing the Sun	Heo Yeon-woo / Wol
2018	Mistress	Jang Se-yeon

=== Television shows ===
Year	Title	Role	Notes	Ref.
2002-2003	Comedy Town			
2003	Entertainment Weekly	Host		
2022	Circle House	Host	with Oh Eun-young, Lee Seung-gi, Noh Hong-chul and Lee Jung	
2022	Sing for Gold	Manager	with Lee Mu-jin	
2022	Greek Roman Myths-Private Life of the Gods	Host		
2022	Day Without Hands	Host	with Shin Dong-yup	
2024	Europe Outside the Tent	Cast Member	Season 4	

=== Radio shows ===
Year	Title	Role	Notes	Ref.
2022	Park So-hyun's Love Game	Special DJ	April 4, 2022	

=== Music video appearances ===
Year	Title	Artist
2005	"Only Wind, Only Wind"	SG Wannabe
2012	"Yeosu Night Sea"	Busker Busker

== Accolades ==
=== Awards and nominations ===
Name of the award ceremony, year presented, category, nominee of the award, and the result of the nomination
Award ceremony	Year	Category	Nominee / Work	Result	Ref.
APAN Star Awards	2012	Top Excellence Award, Actress	Moon Embracing the Sun	Nominated	
Baeksang Arts Awards	2004	Most Popular Actress – Film	Once Upon a Time in High School	Won	
Blue Dragon Film Awards	2004	Best New Actress	Once Upon a Time in High School	Nominated	
KBS Drama Awards	2003	Best New Actress	Yellow Handkerchief	Won	
KBS Drama Awards	2004	Best Couple Award	Han Ga-in (with Song Il-gook); Terms of Endearment	Won	
KBS Drama Awards	2004	Excellence Award, Actress	Terms of Endearment	Won	
Korean Film Awards	2004	Best New Actress	Once Upon a Time in High School	Nominated	
MBC Drama Awards	2005	Excellence Award, Actress	Super Rookie	Won	
MBC Drama Awards	2005	Best Couple Award	Han Ga-in (with Eric Mun); Super Rookie	Nominated	
MBC Drama Awards	2005	Popularity Award, Actress	Super Rookie	Nominated	
MBC Drama Awards	2012	Top Excellence Award, Actress in a Miniseries	Moon Embracing the Sun	Won	
MBC Drama Awards	2012	Best Couple Award	Han Ga-in (with Kim Soo-hyun); Moon Embracing the Sun	Nominated	
MBC Drama Awards	2012	Popularity Award, Actress	Moon Embracing the Sun	Nominated	
Seoul International Drama Awards	2012	Outstanding Korean Actress	Moon Embracing the Sun	Nominated	

=== State honors ===
Name of the organization, year presented, and the award given
Organization	Year	Award	Ref.
47th Taxpayer's Day	2013	Presidential Commendation	
