= Super Rookie =

2005 South Korean TV program

- Promotional poster
- Also known as: New Employee
- Hangul: 신입사원
- Hanja: 新入社員
- RR: Sinipsawon
- MR: Sinipsawŏn
- Written by: Kim Ki-ho; Lee Sun-mi
- Directed by: Han Hee
- Starring: Eric Mun; Han Ga-in; Oh Ji-ho; Lee So-yeon
- Country of origin: South Korea
- Original language: Korean
- No. of episodes: 20

Production
- Producer: Kim Sa-hyun

Original release
- Network: Munhwa Broadcasting Corporation
- Release: March 23 – May 26, 2005

Super Rookie (Korean: 신입사원; RR: Sinipsawon; lit. New Employee) is a 2005 South Korean television series starring Eric Mun, Han Ga-in, Oh Ji-ho, and Lee So-yeon. It aired on MBC from March 23 to May 26, 2005 on Wednesdays and Thursdays at 21:55 for 20 episodes. The workplace comedy is a satire on South Korea's corporate culture and unemployment among the country's younger generation. It scored solid viewership ratings in the 20% range.

== Plot ==
Kang Ho (Eric Mun) is just an average guy who got a college degree in physical education from a second-rate, provincial university. Disheveled, unskilled, and unemployed, Kang Ho has wasted most of his life kickboxing and reading comic books, much to the frustration of his family and friends who think he's just a freeloader. He sends his resumes to many companies, but nobody gives him a shot because he has no experience and no apparent prospects. One day, Kang Ho decides to apply to the same prestigious company that his handsome, successful classmate Bong-sam (Oh Ji-ho) works at. He completely bungles the interview process, but thanks to a computer error, he gets hired as the number one recruit. Struggling in a job he's totally unqualified for, Kang Ho gets by with his enthusiasm and street smarts. His co-workers include Bong-sam, an overachiever trapped by his own ambitions; Mi-ok, a mousy, bespectacled contract worker (or "temp") who was dumped by Bong-sam; and Hyun-ah, the privileged daughter of a company executive.

== Cast ==
=== Main characters ===
- Eric Mun as Kang Ho
- Han Ga-in as Lee Mi-ok
- Oh Ji-ho as Lee Bong-sam
- Lee So-yeon as Seo Hyun-ah

=== Supporting characters ===
- Jung Jin as Joo Sung-tae (Kang Ho's friend)
- Park Chil-yong as Kang Chul (Kang Ho's father)
- Park Hye-sook as Gong Hye-ja (Kang Ho's mother)
- Seo Dong-won as Kang Min (Kang Ho's younger brother)
- Kwon Ki-sun as Madam Kwon
- Yang Hee-kyung as Madam Yang
- Kim Se-joon as Chief Moon Young-ho
- Lee Ki-young as Chief Goo Bon-chul
- Kim Il-woo as Director Song
- Lee Ki-yeol as Director Kim Ki-yeol
- Lee Joo-hee as Na Ae-ri
- Kim Sook as Sook-hee
- Yoo Da-young as Oh Young-ran
- Kim Young-min as Lee Il-man (Bong-sam's father)
- Jung Joon-ha as Kochi (boxing promoter)
- Lee Seung-chul as Chairman Maruyama
- Seo Bum-shik as Miyazaki
- Kim Hun-goo as yakuza

== Ratings ==
Episode	Nationwide	Seoul
Ep. 1	14.3%	15.1%
Ep. 2	15.0%	16.1%
Ep. 3	15.1%	16.2%
Ep. 4	15.1%	16.8%
Ep. 5	17.5%	18.5%
Ep. 6	15.8%	16.7%
Ep. 7	15.1%	15.1%
Ep. 8	14.6%	15.0%
Ep. 9	16.4%	17.6%
Ep.10	17.2%	18.1%
Ep.11	15.9%	16.3%
Ep.12	16.8%	17.8%
Ep.13	15.0%	16.2%
Ep.14	19.0%	20.1%
Ep.15	17.3%	18.7%
Ep.16	16.5%	17.4%
Ep.17	16.3%	17.2%
Ep.18	15.9%	17.7%
Ep.19	17.8%	18.9%
Ep.20	23.1%	23.9%
Average	16.4%	17.47%

Source: TNSMK Media Korea

== International broadcast ==
Fuji TV reportedly paid ₩2 billion for the drama's broadcasting rights in Japan. It was well received by Japanese viewers when it began airing on October 27, 2005, which contributed to Eric Mun's increased popularity in the country. It re-aired on cable channel KNTV from January 19 to February 24, 2011.

In Thailand first aired on Channel 7 from March 25 to May 7, 2006.

In Indonesia first aired on antv from May 12 to August 19, 2007.

== See also ==
- List of Korean television shows
- Contemporary culture of South Korea
