= Sweet Spy =

2005–2006 South Korean TV program

- Promotional poster
- Hangul: 달콤한 스파이
- RR: Dalkomhan seupai
- MR: Talk'omhan sŭp'ai
- Genre: Romance; Comedy; Action
- Written by: Kim Ki-ho; Lee Sun-mi
- Directed by: Go Dong-sun
- Starring: Nam Sang-mi; Dennis Oh; Lee Joo-hyun; Yoo Sun
- Country of origin: South Korea
- Original language: Korean
- No. of episodes: 20

Production
- Executive producer: Choi Chang-wook
- Production companies: LK Production; Yedang Entertainment

Original release
- Network: Munhwa Broadcasting Corporation
- Release: November 7, 2005 – January 10, 2006

Sweet Spy (Korean: 달콤한 스파이; RR: Dalkomhan seupai) is a South Korean television series starring Nam Sang-mi, Lee Joo-hyun, Yoo Sun, and Korean-American model-turned-actor Dennis Oh. It aired on MBC from November 7, 2005 to January 10, 2006 on Mondays and Tuesdays at 21:55 for 20 episodes.

== Plot ==
Lee Soon-ae is a recently widowed traffic cop who finds herself in over her head after she stops a man for committing a routine traffic violation. Han Yoo-il, the mysterious and charming stranger who was stopped by the ever-diligent Soon-ae, is in fact an international spy, who has come to Korea on a top-secret mission. When Soon-ae accidentally forgets to return Yoo-il's super high-tech spy pen to him, she sets in motion a chain of events that pulls her into the shady world of international espionage. Soon, the Special Operations Unit also becomes involved, including its new chief Kang Joon, who happens to be an old friend of Soon-ae's late husband. Kang Joon, who secretly harbors feelings for Soon-ae, opens an old case surrounding the death of her husband. They uncover secrets involving powerful political and economic figures, which leads to Han Yoo-il.

== Cast ==
- Nam Sang-mi as Lee Soon-ae
- Dennis Oh as Han Yoo-il
- Lee Joo-hyun as Kang Joon
- Yoo Sun as Park Eun-joo
- Kim Bo-sung as Detective Shim
- Choi Bool-am as Choi Beom-gu
- Lee Ki-yeol as Wang Sa-bal ("Big Bowl")
- Kim Jun-ho as Kaori ("Stingray")
- Kim Ha-kyun as Jo Jung-hae
- Jung Jong-joon as senior policeman Hong
- Ahn Yeon-hong as Oh Na-ra
- Sung Eun as Choi Ji-soo
- Kim Il-woo as Song Hyun-chul
- Gi Ju-bong as Yoo-il's assistant
- Kim Yong-hee as Director Park
- Park Jung-woo as gangster boss
- Yoon Joo-sang as the commanding officer

== Ratings ==
Date	Episode	Nationwide	Seoul
2005-11-07	ep. 1	10.1% (14th)	10.6% (13th)
2005-11-08	Ep. 2	10.7% (14th)	11.4% (13th)
2005-11-14	Ep. 3	12.3% (10th)	12.4% (10th)
2005-11-15	Ep. 4	10.0% (18th)	10.0% (18th)
2005-11-21	Ep. 5	10.7% (14th)	10.9% (14th)
2005-11-22	Ep. 6	10.4% (15th)	10.7% (15th)
2005-11-28	Ep. 7	10.7% (16th)	10.7% (15th)
2005-11-29	Ep. 8	10.4% (15th)	10.1% (15th)
2005-12-05	Ep. 9	9.9%	9.5%
2005-12-06	Ep. 10	9.8%	9.6%
2005-12-12	Ep. 11	10.2% (17th)	9.9%
2005-12-13	Ep. 12	11.0% (17th)	10.6% (18th)
2005-12-19	Ep. 13	10.8% (17th)	10.2%
2005-12-20	Ep. 14	13.0% (13th)	13.2% (11th)
2005-12-26	Ep. 15	11.8% (13th)	11.8% (11th)
2005-12-27	Ep. 16	10.8% (16th)	10.9% (13th)
2006-01-02	Ep. 17	12.9% (10th)	13.1% (9th)
2006-01-03	Ep. 18	12.1% (15th)	12.3% (14th)
2006-01-09	Ep. 19	11.5% (13th)	11.7% (16th)
2006-01-10	Ep. 20	14.8% (8th)	14.7% (7th)
Average		11.1%	11.2%

Source: TNmS Media Korea

== Accidental nudity ==
In the bathhouse scene in episode 3, three male actors – Choi Bool-am, Lee Ki-yeol and Kim Joon-ho—are seen rubbing each other's backs, their genitals decently out of frame. But the genitals of an extra was fully, if dimly, exposed in the background. Viewers protested on the drama's online message board, and the producers immediately posted an apology. MBC re-edited the scene for re-runs.
