= Lee Kyung-hee =

South Korean screenwriter

- Born: July 26, 1969 (age 57); Jinju, South Gyeongsang Province, South Korea
- Occupation: Screenwriter
- Years active: 1997–present
- Agent(s): SidusHQ, CAMP ENT

Korean name
- Hangul: 이경희
- RR: I Gyeonghui
- MR: I Kyŏnghŭi

Lee Kyung-hee (born 26 July 1969) is a South Korean television screenwriter.

== Career ==
=== Early works ===
Lee Kyung-hee began her television drama writing career penning star vehicles, among them Model (1997) with Kim Nam-joo and Jang Dong-gun, Kkokji (also known as Tough Guy's Love, 2000) with Won Bin, Lee Jong-won and Jo Min-ki, and Purity (also known as Pure Heart, 2001) with Ryu Jin and Lee Yo-won.

But she made a name for herself with comedy-drama Sang Doo! Let's Go to School in 2003. About a young father who becomes a gigolo to pay for his daughter's medical bills, then goes back to finish high school with his first love as his teacher, it marked the successful acting debut of singer Rain. Industry insiders were surprised and impressed with the singer-turned-actor for handling the myriad emotions of his character with range, thanks to Lee who took advantage of Rain's screen presence and charisma, and wrapped the character's evolution around his strengths, trying to minimize his lack of experience. Co-stars Gong Hyo-jin, Lee Dong-gun, and Hong Soo-hyun, as well as director Lee Hyung-min were also praised for their work.

Lee wrote another drama that same year, Breathless (also known as Running After a Dream or I Run), which was directed by Park Sung-soo (who previously helmed Ruler of Your Own World) and starred Kim Kang-woo and Chae Jung-an. It didn't have the popularity of Sang Doo, but gave an interesting, more mature spin to the "class divide" issue in its story about a factory worker entering into a relationship with a middle-class journalist. Through it, Lee proved that she could help rewrite the rules of the most predictable and clichéd genre on TV. Her follow-up was a single episode on anthology series Drama City titled My Older Brother, starring Lee Min-ki as the young immature father of an eight-year-old boy.

=== Mainstream success ===
A year later, Lee Kyung-hee gained popularity, both online and on TV, and critical acclaim with I'm Sorry, I Love You (2004). Featuring So Ji-sub in his star-making performance, opposite rising actress Im Soo-jung, the plot involved overseas adoption, secrets of birth, terminal illness and a love triangle, but because of its focus on the pain and emotional conflicts of the characters, they were made realistic despite the over-the-top storyline. The drama was more emotionally intense than anything Lee had written before, and she was praised by viewers and critics for her well-written script that showed beauty in human tragedy. MiSa (as it's called by fans, the combined first two syllables of its Korean title Mianhada Saranghanda) became one of the rare "mania dramas" (Korean slang for TV series with tremendous online following) that also received high ratings, and it swept the 2004 KBS Drama Awards, while at the 2005 Baeksang Arts Awards So received Best TV Actor and Lee was nominated for Best TV Screenplay.

Lee took it easy for a while after MiSa, and wrote two episodes of Beating Heart (2005), a drama with an experimental omnibus format of six two-part stories made by a different writer-director team. Lee paired with director Kim Jin-man in the segment Outing, which starred Bae Jong-ok as a forty-something woman having marital problems who meets the twenty-something doppelgänger of her college boyfriend (Ji Sung).

Anticipation was high for her next work, and Lee again cast Rain as a K-1 fighter who plans revenge against the actress (Shin Min-ah) who drove his brother to attempted suicide. But despite stylish cinematography from director Kim Kyu-tae, A Love to Kill (2005) was a critical misfire with disappointing ratings.

Lee reunited with another Sang Doo alum, Gong Hyo-jin, in Thank You (2007), about a single mother living on a small island with her grandfather who has dementia (Shin Goo) and her HIV-positive daughter (Seo Shin-ae), until a cynical doctor enters their lives. For the lead actor, Lee cast Jang Hyuk in his acting comeback after mandatory military service. Because of Jang's draft-dodging scandal, the drama received little hype, but the heartwarming story and well-drawn characters, as well as the cast's strong performances guided by director Lee Jae-dong (previously of Sweet Buns), led to solid ratings and it ranked number one in its timeslot. Some critics considered it arguably her finest work, and Lee won Best TV Screenplay at the 2008 Baeksang Arts Awards. It also received the 10th Special Media Award from Amnesty International, for "its frank, yet sensitive portrayal of a young HIV patient and her family and friends; it dealt with a touchy subject that had not been broached in other TV dramas and taught the audience to respect AIDS patients and other underprivileged members of our society."

=== Return to traditional melodrama ===
In Will It Snow for Christmas? (2009), Lee returned to the genre of traditional melodrama. Directed by Choi Moon-suk (previously of What Happened in Bali) and starring Go Soo and Han Ye-seul, the tale of rekindled childhood love lost the ratings battle against blockbuster spy series Iris.

Lee already had Song Joong-ki in mind as the antihero protagonist when she wrote The Innocent Man (2012). Titled in Korean "A Nice Guy the Likes of Which You Would Never Find Anywhere in the World," it tells the story of a man who goes to prison for the woman he loves (Park Si-yeon), but is betrayed by her when she marries a business mogul for money. To get his revenge, he intentionally approaches her step-daughter (Moon Chae-won) to seduce her in order to provoke his ex-lover, creating complicated feelings of love and conflict among the three of them. Lee used the dualism of good and evil, love and revenge, to make her most cohesive, thematically strong drama yet, aided by director Kim Jin-won's unobtrusive yet unerring eye for detail. The cast's acting was praised across the board by viewers and critics, particularly Song for his nuanced portrayal, and The Innocent Man received high ratings throughout its run.

In 2014, Lee reteamed with Kim Jin-won in Wonderful Days, her first time to write a 50-episode weekend drama. Starring Lee Seo-jin and Kim Hee-sun, the plot revolved around a prosecutor who returns to his hometown after 15 years and tries to reconnect with his long-estranged family and friends.

=== Transfer to cable TV ===
In 2019, Lee will do her first project under a pay TV network. Her upcoming work, Chocolate, will be broadcast on JTBC.

== Other activities ==
Lee is also a professor at Doowon Technical University College where she teaches television writing.

== Filmography ==
- Chocolate (JTBC, 2019)
- Uncontrollably Fond (KBS2, 2016)
- Wonderful Days (KBS2, 2014)
- The Innocent Man (KBS2, 2012)
- Will It Snow for Christmas? (SBS, 2009–2010)
- Thank You (MBC, 2007)
- A Love to Kill (KBS2, 2005)
- Beating Heart "Outing" (MBC, 2005)
- I'm Sorry, I Love You (KBS2, 2004)
- Drama City "My Older Brother" (KBS2, 2004)
- Breathless (MBC, 2003)
- Sang Doo! Let's Go to School (KBS2, 2003)
- Drama City "Days Filled with Sunlight" (KBS2, 2002)
- Drama City "Happier Than Heaven" (KBS2, 2002)
- Purity (KBS2, 2001)
- Tough Guy's Love (KBS2, 2000)
- MBC Best Theater "So-young's Mom? and Other Stories" (MBC, 1998)
- I Only Know Love (MBC, 1998–2000)
- Model (SBS, 1997)

== Awards ==
- 2008 44th Baeksang Arts Awards: Best TV Screenplay (Thank You)
- 2007 20th Korean TV Writers' Awards: Recipient, Drama category (Thank You)
- 2005 Korean TV and Radio Writers Association: Excellence Award in Drama (A Love to Kill)
