= Kim Min-seo =

South Korean actress (born 1984)

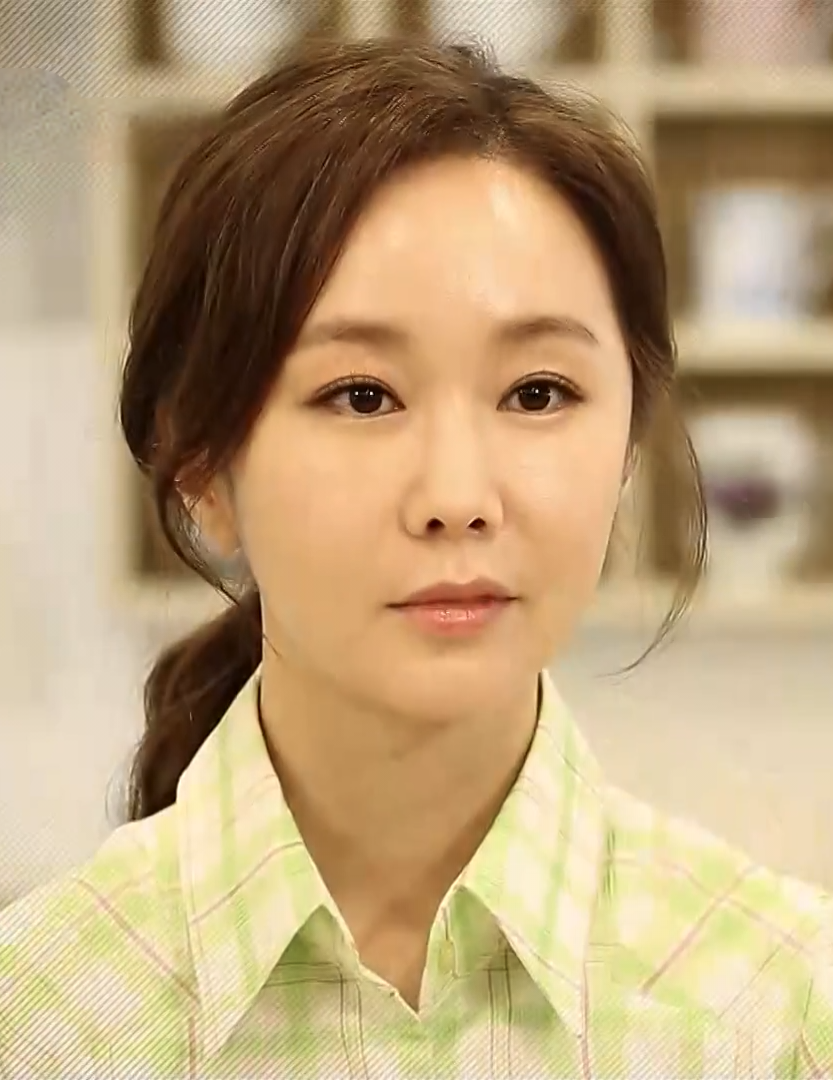
- Kim in 2017
- Born: March 16, 1984 (age 42); Seoul, South Korea
- Education: Dankook University - Theater and Film
- Occupation: Actress
- Years active: 2000–2017
- Agent: Fly-up

Korean name
- Hangul: 김민서
- Hanja: 金旼序
- RR: Gim Minseo
- MR: Kim Minsŏ

Kim Min-seo (Korean: 김민서, pronounced [kim min sʰʌ̹]; born March 16, 1984) is a South Korean actress. She debuted as Kim Se-ha in the short-lived K-pop three-member girl group Mint, which was active from 1999 to 2000. When Mint disbanded, she turned to acting. Kim is best known for her role as a villainous queen consort in the period drama Moon Embracing the Sun (2012).

== Filmography ==
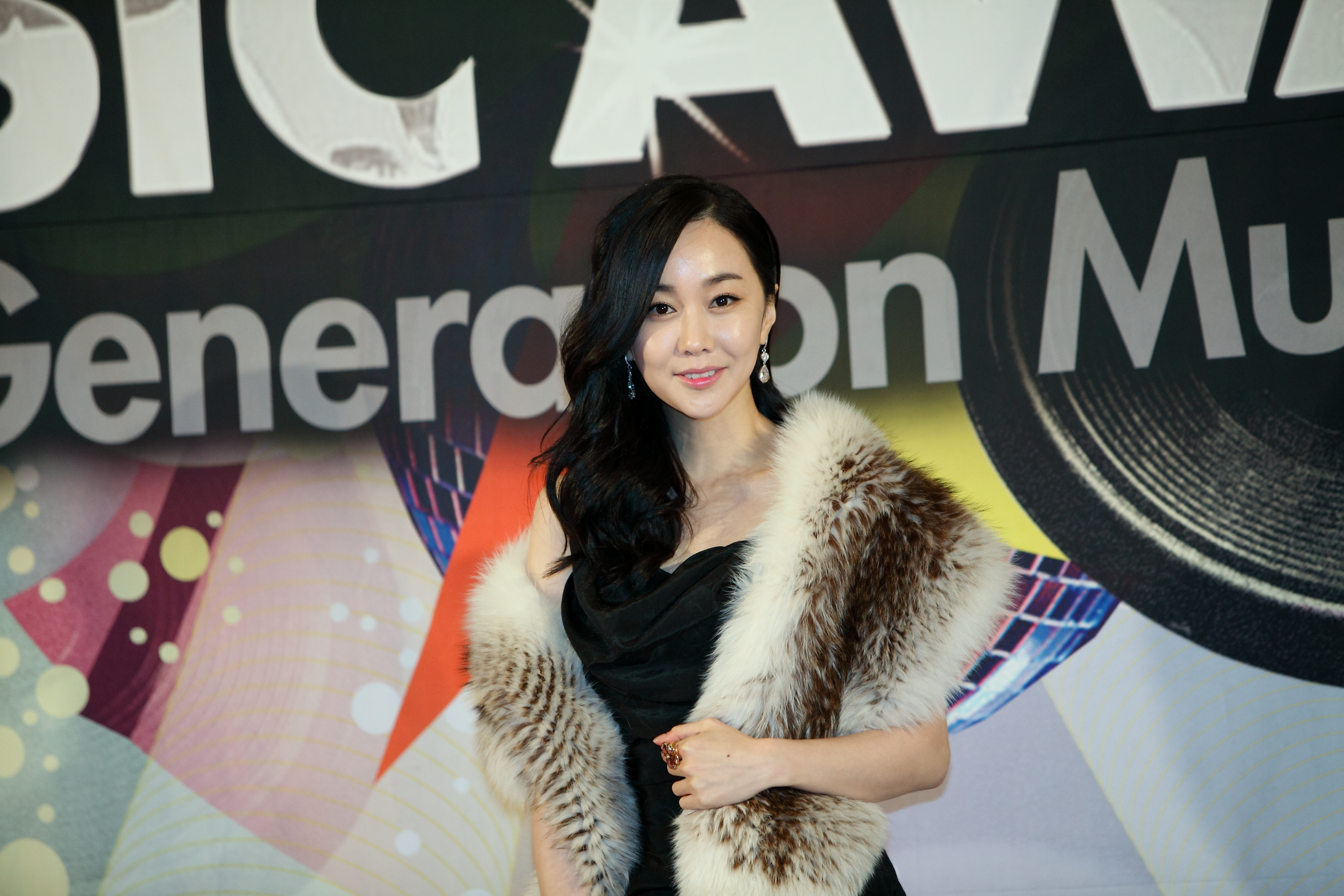
Kim at the 2010 Melon Music Awards

=== Television series ===
Year	Title	Role	Ref.
2008	I Love You	Ah-young	
2010	Bad Guy	Choi Sun-young	
2010	Sungkyunkwan Scandal	Cho-sun	
2010	It's Okay, Daddy's Girl	Park Da-bin	
2011	Baby Faced Beauty	Kang Yoon-seo	
2011	KBS Drama Special: "Human Casino"	Seo Jung-sun	
2011	KBS Drama Special: "Behind the Scenes of the Seokyeong Sports Council Reform"	Jeon Se-young	
2012	Moon Embracing the Sun	Yoon Bo-kyung	
2013	7th Grade Civil Servant	Shin Sun-mi	
2013	Case Number 113	Seung-joo	
2013	Good Doctor	Yoo Chae-kyung	
2014	Rosy Lovers	Baek Soo-ryun	
2015	Splendid Politics	Jo Yeo-jeong	
2016	I'm Sorry, But I Love You	Jung Mo-ah	
2017	Witch at Court	Heo Yoon-kyung	

=== Film ===
Year	Title	Role	Notes	Ref.
2012	Fighting! Family		segment: "In Good Company"	
2014	Murderer	Mi-hee		
2017	Coffee Mate	Yoon-jo		

=== Music video appearances ===
Year	Song title	Artist	Ref.
2006	"Today" 오늘 하루	Cool	
2006	"Charlie's Angels"	Destiny	
2011	"Please"	Kim Hyun-joong	

=== Television show ===
Year	Title	Role	Ref.
2015	Atelier Story - Season 2	MC	

== Musical theatre ==
Year	Title	Role	Ref.
2007	The Beautiful World		

== Awards and nominations ==
Name of the award ceremony, year presented, category, nominee of the award, and the result of the nomination
Award ceremony	Year	Category	Nominee / Work	Result	Ref.
KBS Drama Awards	2011	Best Supporting Actress	Baby Faced Beauty	Nominated	
KBS Drama Awards	2013	Best Supporting Actress	Good Doctor	Nominated	
Korea Drama Awards	2011	Best New Actress	Baby Faced Beauty, Sungkyunkwan Scandal	Nominated	
MBC Drama Awards	2012	Best New Actress	Moon Embracing the Sun	Nominated	
