= I'm Sorry, I Love You =

2004 South Korean television drama series

- Promotional poster
- Also known as: Sorry, I Love You; Sorry, But I Love You; I Am Sorry But I Love You
- Hangul: 미안하다 사랑한다
- RR: Mianhada saranghanda
- MR: Mianhada saranghanda
- Genre: Melodrama; Romance; Tragedy
- Developed by: KBS Drama Division
- Written by: Lee Kyung-hee
- Directed by: Lee Hyung-min
- Starring: So Ji-sub; Im Soo-jung
- Music by: Choi Seong-wook
- Country of origin: South Korea
- Original language: Korean
- No. of episodes: 16

Production
- Executive producer: Kim Jong-sik (KBS Drama Operations Team)
- Producer: Jung Sung-hyo
- Production locations: Korea, Australia
- Running time: Mondays and Tuesdays at 21:55 (KST)
- Production company: GROUP EIGHT

Original release
- Network: KBS2
- Release: November 8 – December 28, 2004

Related
- What Happened in Bali (2004)

I'm Sorry, I Love You (Korean: 미안하다, 사랑한다; RR: Mianhada, saranghanda) is a 2004 South Korean television drama series starring So Ji-sub and Im Soo-jung. It aired on KBS2 from November 8 to December 28, 2004, on Mondays and Tuesdays for 16 episodes.

The series was a commercial and critical success, winning the 41st Baeksang Arts Awards Best TV Drama, and eventually produced remakes to Turkish, Chinese, Thai and Japanese audiences. A new version was announced to celebrate its 20th anniversary.

== Plot ==
Cha Moo-hyuk is a part-time scam artist working the streets of Australia. He was abandoned by his parents as a child and adopted by a couple in Australia. However, he was mistreated by his foster parents and thus roams the streets, cheating tourists out of their money. It is through one of these scams that he bumps into Song Eun-chae.

Eun-chae is the fashion coordinator and childhood friend of a famous Korean singer, Choi Yoon. She sees Yoon as her life's focal point, and does everything she can to please him. Yoon visits Melbourne, Australia to do a photoshoot with another famous Korean actress, Kang Min-joo. Yoon asks Eun-chae to get him close to Min-joo, and though it breaks Eun-chae's heart, she does so. One day, Eun-chae's luggage and money are stolen by the same band of criminals as Moo-hyuk.

Tired, hungry and helpless, she wanders the streets until she bumps into Moo-hyuk who, moved by her plight, manages to find the stuff stolen by his gang, and returns it to her. She returns to Korea and bumps into Min-joo and Yoon, who are now a couple.

Several weeks later, Moo-hyuk receives an invitation to his ex-girlfriend's wedding. At the wedding, he is accidentally shot twice in the head when someone attempts an assassination on his ex-girlfriend's husband. The doctor saves him but can only remove one bullet, as the remaining bullet is lodged too deeply and cannot be surgically removed. It's killing him, and he has no longer than a year to live. Guilt-stricken, his ex-girlfriend gives him a stash of cash and tells him to go back to his native Korea to find his birth parents. He does so, and finds out that his mother is famous Korean actress, Audrey. Her son is Choi Yoon, and both mother and son are adored by the public.

Moo-hyuk can't help but feel betrayed because his mother is doing so well in life, whilst he is suffering and has little time left. He vows revenge and starts by getting close to Yoon, becoming his road manager. He plots to bring Yoon and his mother down, but also falls in love with Eun-chae. Yoon becomes injured in a car accident, and will die without a heart transplant. Moo-hyuk is suddenly faced with the decision of saving his brother, or letting him die as revenge.

Moo-hyuk then finds out that his mother did not abandon him. His mother had an affair with a married man, and Audrey's parents instructed Eun-chae's father (then Audrey's chauffeur) to give away Moo-hyuk and his twin sister as soon as they were born. Audrey was not cognizant of the fact that she had given birth to twins, and was simply told that her child had died. Eun-chae's father thought he was "saving" Audrey's reputation. Audrey had adopted Yoon in memory of her son.

Eun-chae's father admits to the truth and tells Moo-hyuk he is willing to accept any punishment, and Moo-hyuk replies that one day he will receive it.

Moo-hyuk kills himself in a motorcycle accident so that his heart can be transplanted into Yoon. Before his death, he calls Eun-chae and tells her, "I'm sorry. I love you." His heart is given to Yoon, who makes a full recovery. One year later, a heartbroken Eun-chae goes to Melbourne and to his grave, and dies next to it with a small red bottle, leading the viewer to believe she committed suicide by drinking poison. This is the punishment that Eun-chae's father receives — the death of his own daughter.

== Cast ==
=== Main ===
- So Ji-sub as Cha Moo-hyuk / Danny Anderson
- Im Soo-jung as Song Eun-chae
- Jung Kyung-ho as Choi Yoon
- Seo Ji-young as Kang Min-joo
- Lee Hye-young as Oh Deul-hee or "Audrey" (Yoon's mother)

=== Supporting ===
- Jeon Hye-jin as Yoon Seo-kyung
- Shin Goo as Min Hyun-seok
- Lee Young-ha as Song Dae-cheon (Eun-chae's father)
- Park Gun-woo as Kim Gal-chi (Seo-kyung's son)
- Kim Hye-ok as Jang Hye-sook
- Ok Ji-young as Song Sook-chae (Eun-chae's older sister)
- Jung Hwa-young as Song Min-chae (Eun-chae's younger sister)
- Choi Yeo-jin as Moon Ji-young
- David No as assassin

=== Others ===
- Shin Dong-wook (ep. #1)

== Soundtrack ==
I'm Sorry, I Love You Original Sound Track

Soundtrack album by Various Artists
- Released: November 15, 2004; December 24, 2004
- Genre: Soundtracks
- Length: 55:29; 52:05
- Label: BMG (KR)

The original soundtrack of the series was released as two parts by BMG (KR). The first part was released on November 15, 2004 and the second one on December 24, 2004.

=== Track listing ===
Part 1 (Original Sound Track)
No.	Title	Artist	Length
1.	"Intro"	Kim Seon Kyeong	0:55
2.	"Snow Flower (눈의 꽃)"	Park Hyo-shin	5:39
3.	"The First Time (처음 그대로)"	Jung Jae-wook	3:43
4.	"Someone Lives In My Heart (가슴에 누가 살아요)"	J	3:49
5.	"One Day Has Passed (하루가 지나고)"	Bada	3:53
6.	"Please Go Back (돌아가줘)"	Jung Jae-wook	4:18
7.	"Giant (거인)"	J	3:47
8.	"Flying Without Wings"	Westlife	3:37
9.	"Precious Person (소중한 사람)"	Kim Sung-pil	4:20
10.	"Erased Memories (지워진 기억)"	Lee So-jung	3:18
11.	"Wherever You Will Go"	The Calling	3:29
12.	"The First Time (처음 그대로) [instrumental]"	Various	3:42
13.	"One Day Has Passed (하루가 지나고) [instrumental]"	Various	2:33
14.	"Snow Flower (눈의 꽃) [instrumental]"	Various	5:41
15.	"Outro"	Various	2:37

Part 2 (Original Sound Track - Never Ending Story)
No.	Title	Artist	Length
1.	"Main Title"	Choi Sung Wook	1:22
2.	"은채 & 무혁 첫키스"	Im Soo-jung	2:04
3.	"Snow Flower (눈의 꽃) [acoustic version]"	Seo Young-eun	3:39
4.	"멜버른 거리에서"	Kim Seon-kyung	2:44
5.	"마지막 선택"	Kim Seon-kyung	1:16
6.	"윤아, 괜찮아. - 은채 Narrative"	Im Soo-jung	0:33
7.	"Precious Person (소중한 사람)"	Jung Kyung-ho	4:19
8.	"아들과 엄마"	Choi Sung-wook	2:04
9.	"이방인"	Kim Seon-kyung	2:04
10.	"무혁의 기도"	Kim Seon-kyung	3:47
11.	"나 당신에게 약속합니다. - 무혁 Narrative"	So Ji-sub	1:11
12.	"Snow Flower (눈의 꽃) [acoustic version] [instrumental]"	Various	3:39
13.	"운명"	Kim Seon-kyung	1:57
14.	"진실"	Kim Seon-kyung	2:14
15.	"은채의 방"	Kim Seon-kyung	2:53
16.	"은채의 고백 - 은채 Narrative"	Im Soo-jung	1:52
17.	"설레임"	Kim Seon-kyung	1:12
18.	"엄마의 사진"	Nakamura Yuriko	4:44
19.	"Talk to Me"	Machan	3:23
20.	"가려진 세월"	Nakamura Yuriko	4:58

== Ratings ==
Episode	Seoul	Nationwide
1	16.6%	16.1%
2	16.7%	16.1%
3	19.3%	18.5%
4	17.1%	16.9%
5	19.3%	19.8%
6	17.7%	18.5%
7	15.4%	16.5%
8	15.3%	17.0%
9	17.5%	18.2%
10	19.6%	20.1%
11	20.3%	20.3%
12	22.5%	21.7%
13	22.7%	23.2%
14	27.4%	27.1%
15	25.7%	25.6%
16	28.6%	29.2%
Average	20.3%	20.1%

Source: TNSMK Media Korea

=== Awards and nominations ===
Year	Award	Category	Recipient	Result
2004	KBS Drama Awards	Excellence Award, Actor	So Ji-sub	Won
2004	KBS Drama Awards	Best New Actor	Jung Kyung-ho	Nominated
2004	KBS Drama Awards	Best New Actress	Im Soo-jung	Won
2004	KBS Drama Awards	Best Child Actor	Park Gun-tae	Won
2004	KBS Drama Awards	Netizen Award, Actor	So Ji-sub	Won
2004	KBS Drama Awards	Netizen Award, Actress	Im Soo-jung	Won
2004	KBS Drama Awards	Popularity Award, Actor	So Ji-sub	Won
2004	KBS Drama Awards	Popularity Award, Actress	Im Soo-jung	Won
2004	KBS Drama Awards	Best Couple Award	So Ji-sub and Im Soo-jung	Won
2005	41st Baeksang Arts Awards	Best TV Drama	I'm Sorry, I Love You	Won
2005	41st Baeksang Arts Awards	Best Actor (TV)	So Ji-sub	Won
2005	41st Baeksang Arts Awards	Best New Actress (TV)	Im Soo-jung	Nominated
2005	41st Baeksang Arts Awards	Best Screenplay (TV)	Lee Kyung-hee	Nominated
2005	41st Baeksang Arts Awards	Most Popular Actor (TV)	So Ji-sub	Nominated
2005	41st Baeksang Arts Awards	Most Popular Actress (TV)	Im Soo-jung	Nominated
2005	32nd Korean Broadcasting Awards	Best Drama	I'm Sorry, I Love You	Won

== In popular culture ==
- In episode 29 of SBS TV's My Absolute Boyfriend, the line "Will you eat with me or live with me?" is mentioned to have come from this drama. The main actors, So Ji-sub and Im Soo-jung were also mentioned.

== International broadcast ==
- Vietnam: The series began airing on October 11, 2005 on HTV9 at 5:00 p.m.
- Japan: The series began airing on May 17, 2006 on TV Tokyo, from Monday to Thursday at 12:30 a.m.
- Thailand: The series began airing on September 27, 2008 on Channel 3, from Saturday to Sunday at 1:00 a.m. on Saturdays and 0:30 a.m. on Sundays.
- Indonesia: The series began airing on February 13, 2013 on Indosiar at 7:00 p.m.

== Animation ==
G&G Entertainment released a 35-minute animated version of the drama, titled Between of One Year, consisting of highlights from the drama and new scenes dealing with the year following Moo-hyuk's death and before Eun-chae commits suicide. The script was supervised by the writer of the original live-action drama, Lee Kyung-hee. It was released on DVD on February 6, 2008.

== Remakes ==
- Bir Aşk Hikayesi (lit. "A Love Story"), starring Seçkin Özdemir and Damla Sönmez, is a Turkish remake that aired on Fox TV beginning March 26, 2013.
- Sorry, I Love You (对不起，我爱你) is a Chinese remake that was released on January 3, 2014.
- In Thailand, a remake under the title ขอโทษที่รักเธอ (lit. "Sorry, I Love You") began airing on March 2, 2016 on ONE HD, from Wednesday to Thursday at 8:00 p.m.-9:30 p.m.
- In Japan it was remade by TBS as Gomen, Aishiteru (ごめん、愛してる), starring Tomoya Nagase, Shinobu Otake and Kentaro Sakaguchi.
