= Bad Guy (TV series) =

2010 South Korean melodrama television series

- Promotional poster for Bad Guy
- Also known as: Bad Boy; Bad Man
- Hangul: 나쁜 남자
- RR: Nappeun namja
- MR: Nappŭn namja
- Genre: Melodrama
- Directed by: Lee Hyung-min
- Starring: Kim Nam-gil; Han Ga-in; Kim Jae-wook; Oh Yeon-soo; Jung So-min
- Composer: Choi Seong-wook
- Country of origin: South Korea
- Original language: Korean
- No. of episodes: 17

Production
- Production locations: Korea; Nagoya, Japan
- Running time: Wednesdays and Thursdays at 21:55 (KST)
- Production companies: Good Story; KPAX; NHK

Original release
- Network: Seoul Broadcasting System
- Release: 26 May – 5 August 2010

Bad Guy (Korean: 나쁜 남자) is a 2010 South Korean melodrama television series, starring Kim Nam-gil, Han Ga-in, Kim Jae-wook, Oh Yeon-soo and Jung So-min. Directed by Lee Hyung-min, it aired on SBS from May 26 to August 5, 2010 on Wednesdays and Thursdays at 21:55 for 17 episodes.

== Plot ==
In one night, Gun-wook (Kim Nam-gil) lost everything because of the Hong family. They took him in, believing he was President Hong's illegitimate son Tae-sung, and then cast him aside into the streets when it turned out to be a mistake. Years later, Gun-wook returns for revenge, taking down the Hongs and their Haeshin corporation step by step. The real Hong Tae-sung (Kim Jae-wook) and sisters Mo-ne (Jung So-min) and Tae-ra (Oh Yeon-soo) are all chess pieces in his impeccable revenge plan, but he never planned on meeting and falling in love with the smart and equally ambitious Jae-in (Han Ga-in).

== Cast ==
=== Main characters ===
- Kim Nam-gil as Shim Gun-wook
  - Kang Soo-han as young Gun-wook
- Han Ga-in as Moon Jae-in
- Kim Jae-wook as Hong Tae-sung
  - Park Joon-mok as young Tae-sung
- Oh Yeon-soo as Hong Tae-ra
  - Moon Ga-young as young Tae-ra
- Jung So-min as Hong Mo-ne

=== Supporting characters ===
- Kim Hye-ok as Mrs. Shin
- Jeon Gook-hwan as President Hong
- Shim Eun-kyung as Moon Weon-in
- Ji Hoo as Lee Beom-woo
  - Chae Gun as young Beom-woo
- Kim Min-seo as Choi Sun-young
  - Lee Ji-eun as young Sun-young
- Kim Jung-tae as Jang Gam-dok
- Ha Joo-hee as Jeon Hye-joo
- Park Ah-in as Da-rim
- Jung Seung-oh as Uhm Sang-moo
- Jeon Min-seo as Hong So-dam, Tae-ra's daughter
- Song Ji-eun as Gun-wook's mother
- Song Joo-yeon as Song Joo-yeon
- Uhm Tae-goo as Tae-ra's bodyguard
- Joo Jin-mo

== Production ==
In analyzing his character Gun-wook, Kim Nam-gil described him as "an innocent but bad guy," saying, "You can't hate him because while his actions may be based on vengeance; he's actually lonely and is longing for love." About portraying the pretty, smart and ambitious Moon Jae-in, Han Ga-in said she "accepted the role in the drama because I wasn't scared to brush off my goddess image from commercials." Hong Tae-ra's mundane life is shattered when she falls for Gun-wook, and Oh Yeon-soo admitted feeling nervous about her love scene with Kim.

Regarding the racy kissing scene between him and Oh, Kim commented that "Actually, I thought it would be good if it were steamy. I wanted to give this married woman with a child and a family a dangerous fantasy, or even a vicarious sense of satisfaction." He added that he prefers working with married women than single ones, saying, "The difference between shooting a melodrama with married and single actresses are they themselves seem to feel more comfortable and talk openly. It gives us a chance to become close and talk about this and that while not having to worry about getting involved in a scandal. In a way, married people are my seniors in life so I can learn a lot from them. I want to shoot more melodramas with married actresses from now on."

In the middle of filming, Kim received his draft notice for mandatory military service. He applied for a deferment in order to wrap up the shoot for the series, but it was not granted. Kim shot as much as he could (his scenes were reduced, and a body double was also used) until July 13, then entered the army two days later on July 15, 2010.

== Ratings ==
Episode #	Original broadcast date	Average audience share			
Episode #	Original broadcast date	TNmS Ratings		AGB Nielsen	
Episode #	Original broadcast date	Nationwide	Seoul National Capital Area	Nationwide	Seoul National Capital Area
1	2010 May 26	12.0%	12.4%	11.7%	13.1%
2	2010 May 27	12.8%	12.9%	10.7%	11.8%
3	2010 June 3	12.2%	12.5%	12.1%	12.8%
4	2010 June 9	14.2%	14.3%	12.9%	14.1%
5	2010 June 10	15.1%	15.5%	14.2%	16.0%
6	2010 June 30	7.2%	8.1%	5.6%	6.5%
7	2010 July 1	8.3%	8.6%	6.9%	8.4%
8	2010 July 7	7.9%	8.1%	7.0%	7.2%
9	2010 July 8	8.7%	9.0%	7.5%	8.7%
10	2010 July 14	8.9%	9.9%	7.1%	8.3%
11	2010 July 15	8.1%	8.2%	6.4%	7.4%
12	2010 July 21	8.0%	8.3%	6.1%	7.1%
13	2010 July 22	8.9%	9.4%	7.0%	8.1%
14	2010 July 28	7.8%	8.1%	6.4%	7.3%
15	2010 July 29	12.4%	12.7%	10.4%	11.3%
16	2010 August 4	8.8%	8.8%	7.5%	8.5%
17	2010 August 5	9.3%	9.4%	8.4%	9.6%
Average		10.0%	10.3%	9.8%	10.1%

== Awards and nominations ==
Year	Award	Category	Recipient	Result
2010	SBS Drama Awards	Top Excellence Award	Kim Nam-gil	Nominated

== International broadcast ==
Renamed as Black and Red (赤と黒) in Japan, it first aired twice on cable channel NHK BS Premium dubbed in Japanese. It was later broadcast in its original Korean audio with Japanese subtitles on the main terrestrial channel NHK starting September 4, 2011, airing two episodes a day from Monday to Thursday for a total of two weeks. NHK was also one of the drama's investors.

It aired in Taiwan on Gala TV beginning October 5, 2011.

It aired in Thailand on Modern Nine TV every Monday to Friday at 1:00 p.m. starting from March 2, 2012.
