= Witch Yoo Hee =

2007 South Korean television series

- from left to right: Kim Jeong-hoon, Dennis Oh, Han Ga-in, Jae Hee and Jeon Hye-bin
- Also known as: Yoo Hee, The Witch; Witch Amusement
- Hangul: 마녀유희
- Hanja: 魔女遊戲
- RR: Manyeo Yuhui
- MR: Manyŏ Yuhŭi
- Written by: Kim Won-jin; Kim Min-jeon
- Directed by: Jun Ki Sang
- Starring: Han Ga-in; Jae Hee; Kim Jeong-hoon; Dennis Oh; Jeon Hye-bin
- Country of origin: South Korea
- No. of episodes: 16

Production
- Running time: Wednesday & Thursday 21:55
- Production companies: KALLISTA; ZeroOne Interactive

Original release
- Network: Seoul Broadcasting System
- Release: March 21 – May 10, 2007

Witch Yoo Hee (Korean: 마녀유희; also known as Witch Amusement), is a South Korean TV drama series broadcast by SBS in 2007.

== Plot ==
Ma Yoo-hee (Han Ga-in), director of her father's advertising company, is dubbed as a witch due to her ruthless behavior. After some failed attempts to hire a housekeeper, she runs into Chae Moo-ryeong (Jae Hee), ex-medical student turned aspiring chef. Moo-ryeong agrees to become Yoo-hee's housekeeper for one month and gives her a makeover. Despite having a girlfriend, Seung-mi (Jeon Hye-bin), Moo-ryeong eventually finds himself falling for Yoo-hee.

== Cast ==
=== Main ===
- Han Ga-in as Ma Yoo-hee
  - Park Bo-young as young Yoo-hee
- Jae Hee as Chae Moo-ryeong
- Kim Jeong-hoon as Yoo Joon-ha
- Dennis Oh as Johnny Kruger
- Jeon Hye-bin as Nam Seung-mi

=== Extended ===
- Ahn Suk-hwan as Chae Byung-seo (Moo-ryeong's father)
- Song Ok-sook as Moo-ryeong's mother
- Sung Dong-il as Lee Tim Chang
- Hwang Ji-hyun as Han Sae-rae (Yoo-hee's friend)
- Byun Hee-bong as Ma Yoon-hoon (Yoo-hee's father)
- Jo Kye-hyung as Chae Song-hwa (Moo-ryeong's brother)
- Choi Eun-joo as Song-hwa's girlfriend
- Jennifer Bae as Alison
- Han Young-kwang
- Moon Ga-young
- Baek Hyun-seo
- Lee Joong-yeol
- Kang San
- Ban Ya-sung

== Episode ratings ==
Date	Episode	Nationwide	Seoul
2007-03-21	1	13.0% (10th)	14.1% (8th)
2007-03-22	2	16.3% (6th)	17.3% (6th)
2007-03-28	3	15.5% (7th)	17.0% (4th)
2007-03-29	4	17.5% (5th)	19.3% (5th)
2007-04-04	5	15.3% (7th)	16.4% (7th)
2007-04-05	6	15.5% (8th)	16.4% (7th)
2007-04-11	7	12.7% (11th)	12.9% (10th)
2007-04-12	8	15.5% (8th)	16.7% (7th)
2007-04-18	9	13.4% (10th)	14.8% (10th)
2007-04-19	10	13.2% (10th)	14.1% (10th)
2007-04-25	11	12.3% (10th)	13.2% (9th)
2007-04-26	12	13.4% (9th)	14.3% (9th)
2007-05-02	13	12.2% (9th)	13.4% (9th)
2007-05-03	14	10.3% (12th)	10.9% (13th)
2007-05-09	15	12.0% (10th)	13.0% (10th)
2007-05-10	16	12.4% (9th)	13.0% (8th)
Average		13.8%	14.8%
