= Lee Hyung-min =

South Korean television drama director

- Occupations: Television director, producer
- Years active: 1994–present

Korean name
- Hangul: 이형민
- RR: I Hyeongmin
- MR: I Hyŏngmin

Lee Hyung-min is a South Korean television drama director.

== Filmography ==
- Autumn in My Heart (KBS2, 2000, producer)
- Drama City "사랑하라, 희망없이" (KBS2, 2001, director)
- Winter Sonata (KBS2, 2002, assistant director)
- Sang Doo! Let's Go to School (KBS2, 2003, director)
- I'm Sorry, I Love You (KBS2, 2004, director)
- The Snow Queen (KBS2, 2006, director)
- Lottery Trio (KBS N, 2008, director)
- Heaven's Postman (SBS, 2010, director)
- Bad Guy (SBS, 2010, director)
- Korean Peninsula (TV Chosun, 2012, director)
- Orange Marmalade (KBS2, 2015, director)
- Strong Girl Bong-soon (JTBC, 2017, director)
- Chocolate (JTBC, 2019, director)
- Nine to Six (SBS, 2026, director)
