= Sang Doo! Let's Go to School =

2003 South Korean television series

- Also known as: Let's Go to School, Sang-doo! All for Love
- Hangul: 상두야, 학교가자!
- RR: Sangduya, hakgyo gaja!
- MR: Sangduya, hakkyo kaja!
- Genre: Romance; Comedy; Drama
- Written by: Lee Kyung-hee
- Directed by: Lee Hyung-min
- Starring: Rain; Gong Hyo-jin; Lee Dong-gun; Park Geon-il
- Country of origin: South Korea
- No. of episodes: 16

Production
- Producer: Lee Hyung Min Lee Eung Bok Kwak Jung Hwan
- Camera setup: Multi-camera
- Running time: Mondays and Tuesdays at 21:50 (KST)
- Production company: KBS Media

Original release
- Network: Korean Broadcasting System
- Release: September 15 – November 4, 2003

Sang-doo! Let's Go to School! (Korean: 상두야, 학교가자!) is a 2003 South Korean television series starring Rain, Gong Hyo-jin, Lee Dong-gun, Hong Soo-hyun and Song Min-joo. It aired on KBS2 from September 15 to November 4, 2003 Mondays and Tuesdays at 21:50 for 16 episodes.

== Synopsis ==
Cha Sang-doo (Rain) and Chae Eun-hwan (Gong Hyo-jin) were best friends growing up, who secretly have crushes on each other. One day, Eun-hwan's family goes bankrupt and debtors rush to collect their belongings. Eun-hwan tries to reason with a debt collector who is taking her father's old record player, but he takes it anyway. Sang-doo, on his way to walk to school with Eun-hwan, sees the whole thing. He tries to purchase it from the man, but is refused. In a struggle to retrieve the record player, Sang-doo ends up throwing a man off a bridge and putting him in a coma. Sang-doo is sent to prison for assault. After being released from prison, he finds that his parents have disowned him and moved to America and Eun-hwan has run off with her family.

Years pass, and Sang-doo now has a daughter, Cha Bo-ri (Song Min-joo), from a one night stand with Han Se-ra (Hong Soo-hyun). She is sick and diagnosed with leukemia. In order to pay off her hospital bills, Sang-doo becomes a gigolo. His uncle (Lee Young-ha) was a former gigolo and gives him advice on the trade.

One day, he comes across his long-lost first love, Eun-hwan, who is now a high school math teacher in his city. In an effort to regain her love, he returns to high school, first as a security guard and then as a student in her class. Unfortunately, she is engaged to his daughter's doctor, Kang Min-suk (Lee Dong-gun). Min-suk and Sang-doo start off as rivals, vying for Eun-hwan's heart, but later end up as good friends. As everything seems to be going smoothly for Sang-doo and Eun-hwan, circumstances prevent them from staying together.

== Cast ==
=== Main ===
Cha Sang-doo – Rain
Sang-doo is the protagonist of the drama. As a boy, he was charismatic and always popular. One day, he tried to retrieve his first love's cherished possession, but in the process kills a man. His life was turned upside down - he was sent to prison, his parents disowned him, and his first love disappeared. He ends up having a child with Han Se-ra. His daughter Bo-ri has leukemia and to pay her medical bills, he secretly becomes a gigolo with the help of his uncle.

Chae Eun-hwan – Gong Hyo-jin
Eun-hwan has been in love with her childhood best friend since high school, but was separated from him due to her family's financial troubles. As a sign of her devotion to him, she takes care of his dog until the day they reunite.

Kang Min-suk – Lee Dong-gun
Min-suk is Eun-hwan's fiancé and also happens to be Cha Bo-ri's attending physician. Initially, he dislikes Sang-doo and always finds ways to challenge him. Eventually, he gets to know Sang-doo's true character and becomes one of his best friends.

Han Se-ra (aka Pal-ran) – Hong Soo-hyun
Se-ra is a wannabe model. She was abandoned by her birth mother when she was young and has lived on her own ever since. She met Sang-doo at a restaurant and fell in love with him. After giving birth to Bo-ri, she gave her up for adoption because she was unable to pay for her medical bills. Sang-doo retrieves Bo-ri and raises her. Se-ra uses this to stay close to Sang-doo.

=== Supporting ===
- Song Min-joo as Cha Bo-ri (Sang-doo's daughter)
- Lee Young-ha as Cha Man-do (Sang-doo's uncle)
- Yeo Seung-hyuk as Chae Ji-hwan (Eun-hwan's brother)
- Jeon Hye-bin as Yoon Hee-seo
- Shin Goo as Song Jong-doo (principal)
- Jung Ae-ri as Gong Shim-ran (Eun-hwan's mother)
- Kim Mi-kyung as Sang-doo's teacher
- Park Geon-il
- Song Ha-yoon (Note: Credited as Kim Byul.)

== Soundtrack ==
1. 세상끝까지
2. My Love - Jung Chul
3. Beautiful Thing
4. 난 멈추지 않는다
5. 내안의 다짐
6. Someday
7. 단념
8. 내 어린 시절 그 바닷가(연주곡)
9. Silver Lining
10. Perfectly Numb
11. 바람속으로
12. 세상끝까지

== Ratings ==
Episode	Nationwide	Seoul
1	20.1% (1st)	20.9% (1st)
2	22.8% (1st)	23.6% (1st)
3	28.0% (1st)	28.7% (1st)
4	30.8% (1st)	31.1% (1st)
5	32.3% (1st)	32.7% (1st)
6	34.4% (1st)	34.6% (1st)
7	36.2% (1st)	36.5% (1st)
8	35.7% (1st)	36.2% (1st)
9	36.1% (1st)	36.7% (1st)
10	36.2% (1st)	37.0% (1st)
11	36.6% (1st)	37.1% (1st)
12	36.5% (1st)	37.0% (1st)
13	36.8% (1st)	37.5% (1st)
14	37.0% (1st)	37.8% (1st)
15	37.6% (1st)	38.4% (1st)
16	38.4% (1st)	39.1% (1st)

== Awards ==
2003 KBS Drama Awards

- Excellence Award, Actress – Gong Hyo-jin
- Best Supporting Actress – Hong Soo-hyun
- Best New Actor – Rain
- Best Actor in a Comic Role – Lee Young-ha
- Best Actress in a Comic Role – Jung Ae-ri
- Best Young Actress – Song Min-joo
- Netizen Award, Actor – Rain
- Netizen Award, Actress – Gong Hyo-jin
- Best Couple Award – Rain and Gong Hyo-jin

2004 Baeksang Arts Awards

- Most Popular Actor (TV) – Rain
