= Flower robot =

Automation device for smart homes

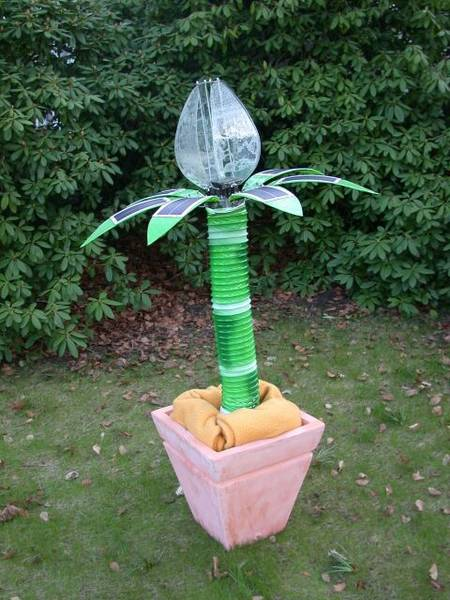
I²CBaMBUS, a flower robot developed by BBS 1 - Technik - Kaiserslautern

In home automation systems and robotics, a flower robot is a simple electromechanical device with the appearance of a common flower, with components such as stem and leaves. First developed by Berufsbildende Schule 1 Kaiserslautern in 2006 and later by Carnegie Mellon University in 2007, flower robots are used as intelligent home appliances, with capabilities such as sensing, simple actuation for movements, and effectors such as lights or humidifier.

== Overview ==
Similar to a flower, the robotic flower contains components such stems and leaves, with small sensors and effectors embedded in the structure. The flower robot developed at Carnegie Mellon University utilized a seven degree of freedom structure, with one used to move the stem towards the left and right, and six other for moving the leaves. Built using simple DC servos, the base structure of the robot actuates the leaves, and uses the IR sensors built in on three of its petals to track objects.

Designed as an intelligent home appliance, the robotic flower has a variety of different functions. Primarily, the flower robot is used as a background sensing device, as it contains sensors for temperature, pressure, voice and light intensity. Unlike other sensors with similar purpose, the appearance of the flower robot makes it easier blend into various rooms, providing more convenient control and accurate results. In addition, the flower robot is capable of small movements using its servos, which can be used to mimic the blooming flower and the stirring of leaves in the wind, creating an aesthetically pleasing environment. Other functions of the flower robot include vision or voice recording, illumination and the use of a scent emitter and a humidifier.

== Development ==
The development of the flower power robot has sparked interests in the shape memory alloy research, as such smart materials can better approximate the motions of a real flower. A group of Korean researchers proposed at the 2007 International Conference on Robotics and Biomimetics the design of a new flower power robot with such materials, and an improvement in performance of the flower robot were shown by numerical simulations.

== See also ==
- Lists of types of robots
