= Air Murder =

2022 South Korean film

- Theatrical release poster
- Hangul: 공기살인
- RR: Gonggisarin
- MR: Konggisarin
- Directed by: Jo Yong-sun
- Written by: Jo Yong-sun
- Based on: Gyun by So Ji-won
- Starring: Kim Sang-kyung; Lee Sun-bin; Yoon Kyung-ho; Seo Young-hee
- Production company: Master One Entertainment
- Distributed by: The Contents On
- Release date: April 22, 2022
- Running time: 108 minutes
- Country: South Korea
- Language: Korean
- Box office: US$1.2 million

Air Murder (Korean: 공기살인; RR: gonggisarin) is a 2022 South Korean legal drama film written and directed by Jo Yong-sun. The film is based on the novel Gyun by So Ji-won, which addresses a humidifier disinfectant disaster, based on a real-life event in Korea. (Note: The humidifier disinfectant incident, which is the subject of the movie, is a tragedy in 2011 that resulted in the death of mothers, infants, due to lung damage or other systemic diseases caused by the humidifier disinfectant. In 2016, five years after the incident, a dedicated investigation team was formed and the biggest perpetrators were punished.) It was released on April 22, 2022.

== Synopsis ==
The setting of Air Murder is based on the PHMG-caused lung disease outbreak and the struggle to uncover its cause in South Korea.

== Cast ==
- Kim Sang-kyung as Jung Tae-hoon

A doctor who loses his wife to an unknown lung disease and even puts his son at risk.

- Lee Sun-bin as Han Young-joo

Gil-joo's younger sister, a prosecutor at the Seoul District Prosecutors' Office who becomes a lawyer after the death of her sister.

- Yoon Kyung-ho as Seo Woo-shik

Manager at manufacturer company of humidifier disinfectant.

- Seo Young-hee Han Gil-joo

Tae-hoon's wife.

- Kim Jung-tae as Hyeon-jong

An owner of a car center who lost his entire family in an instant due to an unknown lung disease.

- Lee Yoo-jun as Yang Gye-jang

Young-joo's colleague at the Seoul District Prosecutors' Office.

- Jo Seo-hoo as Eun-jeong
- Jang Gwang
- Song Young-gyu
- Sung Byung-suk
- Jang Hyuk-jin
- Lee Ji-hoon as In-ho

A doctor who is Jeong Tae-hoon's junior.

== Production ==
Script reading was held on September 29, 2020, and filming began on October 9, 2020.
