= Blind (South Korean TV series) =

2022 South Korean television series

- Promotional poster
- Hangul: 블라인드
- RR: Beullaindeu
- MR: Pŭllaindŭ
- Genre: Mystery; Thriller; Crime drama
- Written by: Kwon Ki-kyung
- Directed by: Shin Yong-hwi; Jang Jeong-do
- Starring: Ok Taec-yeon; Ha Seok-jin; Jung Eun-ji
- Music by: Gaemi
- Country of origin: South Korea
- Original language: Korean
- No. of episodes: 16

Production
- Executive producers: Jang Jeong-do; Kim Chul-min (CP)
- Producers: Kim Seong-min; Yoon Jeong-bin; Choi Yeon-ho
- Running time: 60 minutes
- Production companies: Fantagio; Studio Dragon

Original release
- Network: tvN
- Release: September 16 – November 5, 2022

Blind (Korean: 블라인드; RR: Beullaindeu) is a South Korean television series starring Ok Taec-yeon, Ha Seok-jin, and Jung Eun-ji. It aired on tvN from September 16, to November 5, 2022, airing every Friday and Saturday at 22:40 (KST) for 16 episodes.

== Synopsis ==
The series follows the story of ordinary people who have unfairly become victims to different crimes, their perpetrators, and those who try to catch the perpetrators.

== Cast ==
=== Main ===
- Ok Taec-yeon as Ryu Seong-joon
- Ha Seok-jin as Ryu Seong-hoon/Im Sung-hoon
- Jung Eun-ji as Jo Eun-ki

=== Supporting ===
==== People around Ryu Sung-joon ====
- Jo Seo-hoo as Soo-young, Ryu Sung-joon's college friend

==== Ryu Sung-joon and Sung-hoon's family ====
- Choi Hong-il as Ryu Il-ho
- Cho Kyung-sook as Na Gook-hee

==== People around Jo Eun-ki ====
- Jo Yeon-hee as Jo In-seok
- Kang Na-eon as Kwon Yu-na

==== People Muyeong Police Station ====
- Jung In-gi as Yeom Ki-nam
- Jung Eui-wook as Oh Young-guk
- Yoon Jung-hyuk as Kang Chang-wook
- Gyul Hwi as Na Dong-hwa
- Kim Min-seok as Kim Seok-gu

==== Juror ====
- Kim Ha-kyun as Kang Young-ki
- Choi Ji-yeon as Kwon Gyeong-ja
- Cho Seung-yeon as Bae PD / Bae Cheol-ho
- Chae Dong-hyun as Ahn Tae-ho
- Baek Seung-hee as Yeom Hye-jin
- Park Ji-bin as Jung In-seong/Jung Yoon-Jae
- Choi Jae-sub as Choi Soon-gil
- Choi Gi-sa as Choi Jae-seop
- Oh Seung-yoon as Chef Charles

==== Others ====
- Kim Beop-rae as Baek Moon-kang
- Jeon Jin-woo as Jeong Man-chun
- Jung Chan-woo as Koo Jung-sa

=== Extended ===
- Oh Min-ae as In Seong-mo
- Jung Ji-hoon
- Oh Se-young as Baek Ji-eun

=== Special appearance ===
- Kim San-ho as Park Moo-hyeok

== Release ==
Blind was initially confirmed to be released on OCN. However, it was later announced that the series would air on tvN's Friday and Saturday time slot instead, on September 16.

== Viewership ==
Blind : South Korea viewers per episode (thousands)

Season	Episode number																Average
Season	1	2	3	4	5	6	7	8	9	10	11	12	13	14	15	16	Average
1	769	559	531	487	380	613	511	589	557	606	511	482	628	538	507	790	566

Source: Audience measurement performed nationwide by Nielsen Korea.

Average TV viewership ratings
Ep.	Original broadcast date	Average audience share (Nielsen Korea)	
Ep.	Original broadcast date	Nationwide	Seoul
1	September 16, 2022	3.385% (1st)	3.954% (1st)
2	September 17, 2022	2.430% (3rd)	2.627% (3rd)
3	September 23, 2022	2.460% (1st)	2.540% (1st)
4	September 24, 2022	2.591% (3rd)	2.799% (3rd)
5	September 30, 2022	1.785% (2nd)	1.804% (3rd)
6	October 1, 2022	2.847% (2nd)	3.415% (2nd)
7	October 7, 2022	2.194% (1st)	2.442% (1st)
8	October 8, 2022	2.849% (2nd)	3.191% (2nd)
9	October 14, 2022	2.383% (1st)	2.704% (1st)
10	October 15, 2022	2.582% (2nd)	2.989% (2nd)
11	October 21, 2022	2.535% (1st)	2.912% (1st)
12	October 22, 2022	2.172% (2nd)	2.531% (2nd)
13	October 28, 2022	3.152% (1st)	3.555% (1st)
14	October 29, 2022	2.613% (2nd)	2.790% (3rd)
15	November 4, 2022	2.518% (1st)	2.809% (1st)
16	November 5, 2022	3.136% (2nd)	3.127% (3rd)
Average		2.602%	2.887%
In the table above, the blue numbers represent the lowest ratings and the red numbers represent the highest ratings.; This series aired on a cable channel/pay TV which normally has a relatively smaller audience compared to free-to-air TV/public broadcasters (KBS, SBS, MBC, and EBS).
