= Kim Ga-yeon =

South Korean actress (born 1972)

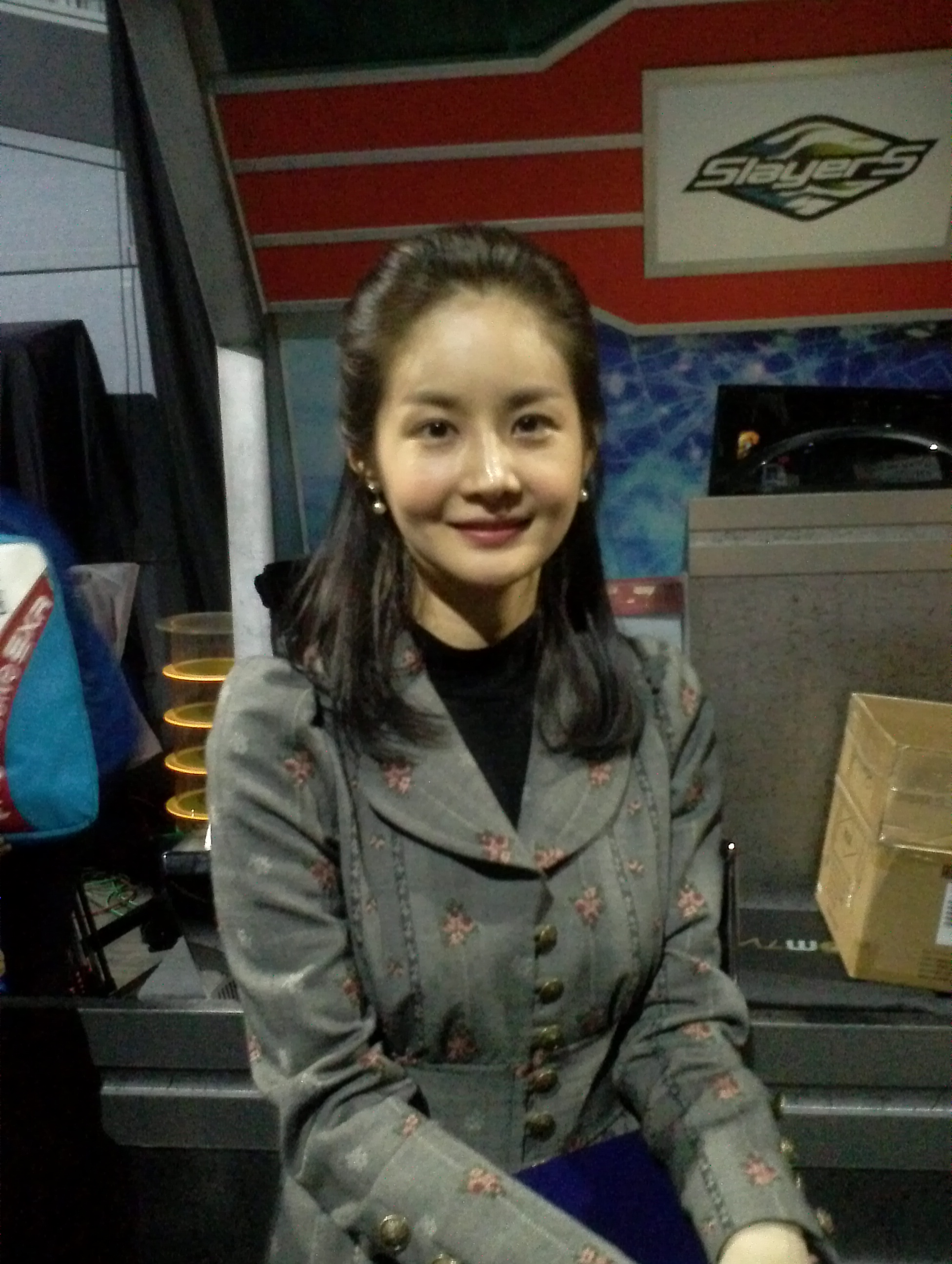
- Kim in 2012
- Born: Kim So-yeon; 9 September 1972 (age 54); Bongseon-dong, Nam District, Gwangju, South Korea
- Education: Hanyang University
- Occupation: Actress
- Years active: 1990–present
- Spouses: Unknown (m. 1995; div. 1998) Lim Yo-hwan (m. 2011)
- Children: 2

Korean name
- Hangul: 김소연
- Hanja: 金沼延
- RR: Gim Soyeon
- MR: Kim Soyŏn

Stage name
- Hangul: 김가연
- RR: Gim Gayeon
- MR: Kim Kayŏn

Kim Ga-yeon (Korean: 김가연; born 9 September 1972), birth name Kim So-yeon, is a South Korean actress and former owner of the StarCraft II team SlayerS.

== Personal life ==
In 2011, Kim entered into a common-law marriage with South Korean former professional StarCraft player Lim Yo-hwan, which was kept secret for two years. They had a daughter, born on 1 August 2015. In 2016, she and Lim had a wedding.

== Filmography ==
=== Television series ===
Year	Title	Role	Network
1995	LA Arirang		SBS
1997	Star in My Heart		MBC
1998	Soonpoong Clinic	Kim Ka-yeon	SBS
1998	The Barefool Youth		KBS2
2001	Life Is Beautiful		KBS2
2002	Royal Story: Jang Hui-bin	Ja-gyung	KBS2
2004	Lovers in Paris	Employee	SBS
2004–2005	Heaven's Fate	Han Ok-Jin	MBC
2005	Youth of Barefoot	Uhm Mi-sun	MBC
2006–2007	Queen of The Game	Samantha	SBS
2007	Cruel Love	Kang Jo-Ran	KBS2
2008	Working Mom	Park In-Hye	SBS
2009	Princess Ja Myung	Yeo-rang	SBS
2009	Enjoy Life	Ji Sook	MBC
2011	Insu, the Queen Mother	Lady Han	jTBC
2013	Ruby Ring	Bae Se-Ra	KBS2
2014	There is a Blue Bird: Cinderella Syndrome	Cameo	TV Chosun
2018	What's Wrong with Secretary Kim		tvN
2020	Brilliant Heritage	Shin Ae-ri	KBS1
2022	Young Lady and Gentleman	Mrs. Kim Shil-jang	KBS2

== Awards and nominations ==
Year	Award	Category	Nominated work	Result
2004	41st Grand Bell Awards	Best Supporting Actress	Mr. Handy	Won
