= Jo Seo-hoo =

South Korean actress (born 1994)

- Born: 8 December 1994 (age 31); Seoul, South Korea
- Other name: Jo Seo-hu
- Occupation: Actress
- Years active: 2017–present
- Agent: K-One Entertainment
- Known for: Brilliant Heritage; Manhole; Blind

Jo Seo-hoo (born 8 December 1994) is a South Korean actress. She is known for her roles in dramas such as Manhole, My Sweet Dear, Brilliant Heritage and Blind. She also appeared in movies such as Race to Freedom: Um Bok Dong, My Sweet Dear, B Cut and Air Murder.

== Filmography ==
=== Television series ===
Year	Title	Role	Ref.
2017	Manhole	Yoon-mi	
2020	Brilliant Heritage	Kim Soo-min	
2022	Blind	Soo-young	

=== Web series ===
Year	Title	Role	Ref.
2021	My Sweet Dear	Laura Kim	

=== Film ===
Year	Title	Role	Ref.
2019	Race to Freedom: Um Bok Dong	Miki	
2021	My Sweet Dear	Laura Kim	
2022	B Cut	Yura	
2022	Air Murder	Eun-jeong	
