= Brilliant Heritage =

2020 South Korean TV series

- Promotional poster
- Also known as: Shocking Legacy; Unbelievable Inheritance
- Hangul: 기막힌 유산
- RR: Gimakhin yusan
- MR: Kimakhin yusan
- Genre: Comedy; Romance; Drama; Family; Melodrama
- Created by: KBS Drama Production
- Written by: Kim Kyung-hee
- Directed by: Kim Hyeong-il
- Starring: Park In-hwan; Kang Se-jung; Shin Jung-yoon
- Country of origin: South Korea
- Original language: Korean
- No. of episodes: 122

Production
- Executive producer: Kim Sang-hee (KBS)
- Producer: Lee Woonghee
- Running time: 30 minutes

Original release
- Network: KBS1
- Release: April 20 – October 9, 2020

Brilliant Heritage (Korean: 기막힌 유산) is a 2020 South Korean television series starring Park In-hwan, Kang Se-jung, and Shin Jung-yoon. It aired on KBS1 every weekday at 20:30 (KST) starting April 20, 2020.

It was the only KBS1 daily soap opera to draw average ratings of more than 20% since the end of Lovers in Bloom in 2017. Lead actor Park In-hwan won the Top Excellence Award during the 2020 KBS Drama Awards. It was one of the first Korean dramas to acknowledge the coronavirus disease 2019 pandemic in passing, with the children being depicted as learning lessons about it and restaurant staff being shown undergoing medical check-ups and observing sanitation protocols.

== Synopsis ==
Boo Young-bae (Park In-hwan) is the owner of an 80-year-old Pyongyang cold noodle restaurant whose health scare causes his children to quarrel over his vast wealth. Feeling betrayed by their behavior, he decides to marry Gong Gye-ok (Kang Se-jung), a 33-year-old single maid enticed by Young-bae's fortune and big family, under false pretenses. The move shocks his sons, but Gye-ok's strong work ethic makes Young-bae realize that she'll be able to keep his cold noodle restaurant afloat. Unlike his siblings, Young-bae's independent and headstrong son, Boo Seol-ak (Shin Jung-yoon), isn't interested in his wealth or family drama, but his disdain for Gye-ok and her presence in his aging father's life motivates him to get involved.

== Cast ==
=== Main ===
- Park In-hwan is Boo Young-bae, an 80-year-old widower who is the father of four neglectful sons, and the owner of a North Korean-style noodle house.
- Kang Se-jung is Gong Gye-ok, a 33-year-old woman who works odd jobs to sustain the lifestyle of her stepmother and her stepsister, and pursue her dream of recovering her late father's restaurant.
- Shin Jung-yoon as Boo Seol-ak, Young-bae's 33-year-old third son, and a single father to a teenage girl.

=== Supporting ===
==== Boo Family ====
- Kang Shin-jo as Boo Baek-doo, the meek 50-year-old first son who is reluctant to take over his father's noodle house.
- Lee Ah-hyun as Yoon Min-Joo, Baek-doo's domineering wife who sees herself as dutiful towards the Boo family.
- Nam Sung-jin as Boo Geum-gang, the brash and financially irresponsible 45-year-old second son.
- Kim Ga-yeon as Shin Ae-ri, Geum-gang's wife who leads a life of luxury, and neglects her duties to the Boo family.
- Park Shin-woo as Boo Halla, the lazy 27-year-old youngest son who has no goals in life.
- Jo Yang-ja as Sung Pan-Geum, a North Korean defector like Young-bae who has since harbored a life-long crush on him and helped him run the noodle house.
- Lee Eung-kyung as Kim Yong-mi, the spendthrift mother of Ae-ri who likes taking care of her granddaughters.
- Kim Bi-joo as Boo Ga-on, the studious and aloof 16-year-old daughter of Seol-ak.
- Kim Yeon-ji as Boo Tae-hee, the nine-year-old daughter of Geum-gang and Ae-ri.
- Kim Hyo-kyung as Boo Hye-gyo, the seven-year-old daughter of Geum-gang and Ae-ri.
- Kang Yoo-ra as Boo Ji-hyun, the five-year-old daughter of Geum-gang and Ae-ri.

==== Gong Family ====
- Park Soon-chun as Jung Mi-hee, the worrywart stepmother of Gye-ok.
- Kim Nan-joo is Gong So-young, the immature stepsister of Gye-ok who is prone to making poor business investments.
- Lee Il-joon as Lee Jang-won, the 18-year-old son of So-young who works at a convenience store. He strikes an unlikely friendship with Ga-on.

==== Other characters ====
- Jo Soon-chang as Lee Kyung-ho, a con man who works for the Buruna Noodle House under the assumed name of Cha Jeong-gun.
- Jung Seo-ha as Lee Chung-ah / Megan Lee, the high school crush of Seol-ak and the biological mother of Ga-on.
- Park Min-ji as Son Bo-mi, the friend of Gye-ok who falls for Halla.
- Jo Seo-hoo as Kim Soo-min, the friend and confidante of Gye-ok.
- Lee Chun-shik as Kim Jong-doo, the friend of Young-bae.
- Joo Min-ha as Kim Young-ji, a college junior of Seol-ak who starts working as a lawyer for his company.
- Park Hyun-jung as Kang Seon-hee, the former lover of Baek-doo.
- Moon Joo-won as Kang Won, the seven-year-old son of Seon-hee, whom Baek-doo starts to like.
- Noh Sang-bo as Lee Jung-tae, the leader of the sales team supervised by Seol-ak.

== Viewership ==
- In this table, the blue numbers represent the lowest ratings and the red numbers represent the highest ratings.
- N/A denotes that the rating is not known.

2020
| Ep. | Original broadcast date | TNmS | Nielsen Korea | |
| Ep. | Original broadcast date | Nationwide | Nationwide | Seoul |
|---|---|---|---|---|
| 1 | 2018/09/03 | 22.6% | 20.1% | 19.3% |
| 2 | 2018/09/04 | 21.6% | 19.2% | 18.2% |
| 3 | 2018/09/05 | 21.1% | 19.2% | 18.3% |
| 4 | 2018/09/06 | 21.0% | 18.8% | 17.1% |
| 5 | 2018/09/10 | 20.5% | 17.5% | 16.2% |
| 6 | 2018/09/11 | 21.0% | 19.4% | 18.2% |
| 7 | 2018/09/12 | 22.0% | 19.6% | 18.9% |
| 8 | 2018/09/13 | 21.2% | 18.2% | 17.1% |
| 9 | 2018/09/17 | 20.3% | 18.6% | 17.8% |
| 10 | 2018/09/18 | 19.1% | 16.9% | 15.8% |
| 11 | 2018/09/19 | 19.6% | 17.7% | 16.5% |
| 12 | 2018/09/20 | 21.7% | 19.2% | 18.4% |
| 13 | 2018/09/24 | 21.2% | 19.1% | 18.0% |
| 14 | 2018/09/25 | 20.7% | 19.8% | 19.0% |
| 15 | 2018/09/26 | 19.5% | 16.5% | 16.1% |
| 16 | 2018/09/28 | 21.7% | 20.0% | 18.9% |
| 17 | 2018/10/01 | 22.1% | 19.4% | 18.6% |
| 18 | 2018/10/02 | 21.8% | 19.1% | 17.9% |
| 19 | 2018/10/03 | 22.6% | 19.7% | 18.6% |
| 20 | 2018/10/04 | 20.9% | 18.6% | 17.5% |
| 21 | 2018/10/08 | 22.1% | 20.2% | 18.8% |
| 22 | 2018/10/09 | 22.8% | 20.0% | 18.7% |
| 23 | 2018/10/10 | 21.7% | 18.9% | 17.7% |
| 24 | 2018/10/11 | 22.7% | 19.6% | 19.0% |
| 25 | 2018/10/15 | 20.9% | 18.2% | 17.4% |
| 26 | 2018/10/16 | 22.4% | 21.4% | 20.4% |
| 27 | 2018/10/17 | 22.2% | 20.6% | 20.3% |
| 28 | 2018/10/22 | 22.8% | 20.0% | 19.1% |
| 29 | 2018/10/23 | 22.6% | 20.2% | 19.5% |
| 30 | 2018/10/24 | 20.6% | 18.1% | 17.5% |
| 31 | 2018/10/25 | 21.7% | 21.4% | 20.7% |
| 32 | 2018/10/29 | 22.0% | 20.5% | 19.6% |
| 33 | 2018/10/30 | 22.3% | 20.1% | 19.5% |
| 34 | 2018/10/31 | 22.8% | 21.8% | 21.1% |
| 35 | 2018/11/01 | 20.7% | 17.8% | 16.9% |
| 36 | 2018/11/05 | 20.8% | 20.7% | 19.9% |
| 37 | 2018/11/06 | 21.9% | 20.3% | 19.3% |
| 38 | 2018/11/07 | 21.6% | 20.1% | 19.3% |
| 39 | 2018/11/08 | 22.8% | 20.9% | 20.7% |
| 40 | 2018/11/12 | 22.0% | 20.5% | 20.4% |
| 41 | 2018/11/13 | 21.6% | 21.2% | 21.2% |
| 42 | 2018/11/14 | 20.9% | 19.7% | 19.7% |
| 43 | 2018/11/15 | 21.4% | 20.8% | 20.3% |
| 44 | 2018/11/19 | 22.7% | 20.7% | 19.5% |
| 45 | 2018/11/20 | 21.8% | 18.7% | 18.3% |
| 46 | 2018/11/21 | 22.2% | 20.6% | 19.7% |
| 47 | 2018/11/22 | 22.0% | 19.7% | 19.3% |
| 48 | 2018/11/26 | 23.1% | 20.0% | 19.3% |
| 49 | 2018/11/27 | 20.8% | 19.0% | 18.5% |
| 50 | 2018/11/28 | 23.1% | 22.0% | 21.0% |
| 51 | 2018/11/29 | 21.1% | 19.8% | 19.6% |
| 52 | 2018/12/03 | 21.1% | 19.9% | 19.1% |
| 53 | 2018/12/04 | 23.5% | 21.0% | 19.9% |
| 54 | 2018/12/05 | 22.3% | 20.1% | 18.5% |
| 55 | 2018/12/06 | - | 21.2% | 20.3% |
| 56 | 2018/12/10 | 21.6% | 19.8% | 18.7% |
| 57 | 2018/12/11 | 21.0% | 20.7% | 20.2% |
| 58 | 2018/12/12 | 22.3% | 20.4% | 18.6% |
| 59 | 2018/12/13 | 21.3% | 20.1% | 19.4% |
| 60 | 2018/12/17 | - | 21.7% | 20.5% |
| 61 | 2018/12/18 | 21.2% | 21.0% | 20.7% |
| 62 | 2018/12/19 | 21.9% | 20.0% | 19.1% |
| 63 | 2018/12/20 | 21.9% | 20.9% | 20.0% |
| 64 | 2018/12/24 | 21.3% | 20.4% | 19.5% |
| 65 | 2018/12/25 | 23.9% | 21.8% | 20.7% |
| 66 | 2018/12/26 | 22.6% | 21.1% | 20.2% |
| 67 | 2018/12/27 | 24.5% | 23.0% | 21.7% |
| 68 | 2018/12/31 | 25.4% | 23.5% | 23.2% |
| 69 | 2019/01/01 | 23.1% | 20.3% | 19.1% |
| 70 | 2019/01/02 | 24.3% | 21.7% | 20.2% |
| 71 | 2019/01/03 | 23.8% | 21.8% | 20.6% |
| 72 | 2019/01/07 | 23.8% | 21.1% | 19.9% |
| 73 | 2019/01/08 | 24.1% | 21.5% | 20.6% |
| 74 | 2019/01/09 | 21.1% | 19.0% | 18.4% |
| 75 | 2019/01/10 | 23.1% | 21.4% | 20.5% |
| 76 | 2019/01/14 | 22.2% | 20.8% | 20.5% |
| 77 | 2019/01/15 | 23.8% | 21.6% | 21.3% |
| 78 | 2019/01/16 | 24.0% | 21.4% | 20.0% |
| 79 | 2019/01/17 | 23.9% | 21.6% | 20.8% |
| 80 | 2019/01/21 | 25.0% | 22.9% | 21.1% |
| 81 | 2019/01/22 | 25.0% | 21.5% | 20.0% |
| 82 | 2019/01/23 | 23.8% | 20.9% | 19.8% |
| 83 | 2019/01/24 | 23.5% | 21.3% | 20.7% |
| 84 | 2019/01/28 | 22.2% | 20.5% | 19.3% |
| 85 | 2019/01/29 | 23.4% | 23.0% | 22.1% |
| 86 | 2019/01/30 | 22.2% | 21.5% | 20.7% |
| 87 | 2019/01/31 | 22.0% | 22.2% | 21.9% |
| 88 | 2019/02/04 | 23.0% | 21.4% | 20.6% |
| 89 | 2019/02/05 | 20.6% | 20.5% | 19.4% |
| 90 | 2019/02/06 | 23.9% | 22.5% | 21.3% |
| 91 | 2019/02/07 | 22.7% | 20.6% | 19.7% |
| 92 | 2019/02/11 | 23.3% | 22.3% | 20.4% |
| 93 | 2019/02/12 | 24.8% | 21.9% | 21.3% |
| 94 | 2019/02/13 | 23.4% | 22.5% | 21.7% |
| 95 | 2019/02/14 | 23.0% | 21.0% | 19.5% |
| 96 | 2019/02/18 | 22.0% | 21.3% | 20.1% |
| 97 | 2019/02/19 | 21.1% | 20.3% | 19.5% |
| 98 | 2019/02/20 | 23.2% | 21.7% | 20.6% |
| 99 | 2019/02/21 | 21.4% | 20.5% | 19.4% |
| 100 | 2019/02/25 | 21.0% | 22.0% | 20.6% |
| 101 | 2019/02/26 | 22.4% | 22.0% | 20.5% |
| 102 | 2019/02/27 | 22.5% | 21.3% | 19.8% |
| 103 | 2019/02/28 | 23.1% | 22.2% | 21.1% |
| 104 | 2019/03/04 | 22.4% | 22.2% | 20.3% |
| 105 | 2019/03/05 | 23.2% | 21.8% | 20.1% |
| 106 | 2019/03/06 | 23.7% | 23.0% | 21.2% |
| 107 | 2019/03/07 | 21.0% | 21.3% | 19.8% |
| 108 | 2019/03/11 | 22.8% | 21.9% | 20.7% |
| 109 | 2019/03/12 | 22.1% | 20.6% | 19.6% |
| 110 | 2019/03/13 | 22.0% | 21.2% | 19.6% |
| 111 | 2019/03/14 | 22.2% | 22.0% | 20.8% |
| 112 | 2019/03/18 | 20.6% | 20.2% | 18.9% |
| 113 | 2019/03/19 | 21.5% | 20.8% | 19.6% |
| 114 | 2019/03/20 | 20.8% | 20.1% | 18.7% |
| 115 | 2019/03/21 | 16.4% | 14.4% | 14.0% |
| 116 | 2019/03/25 | 13.8% | 14.0% | 14.5% |
| 117 | 2019/03/26 | 19.7% | 18.6% | 18.3% |
| 118 | 2019/03/27 | 22.1% | 23.5% | 21.5% |
| 119 | 2019/03/28 | 21.6% | 22.6% | 21.8% |
| 120 | 2019/04/01 | 23.7% | 22.6% | 21.7% |
| 121 | 2019/04/02 | 23.8% | 24.0% | 22.7% |
| 122 | 2019/04/03 | 22.0% | 22.9% | 21.4% |
| Average | | — (Note: Due to some ratings not recorded, the exact average rating is unknown.) | 20.5% | 19.6% |
