= Park In-hwan (actor) =

South Korean actor (born 1945)

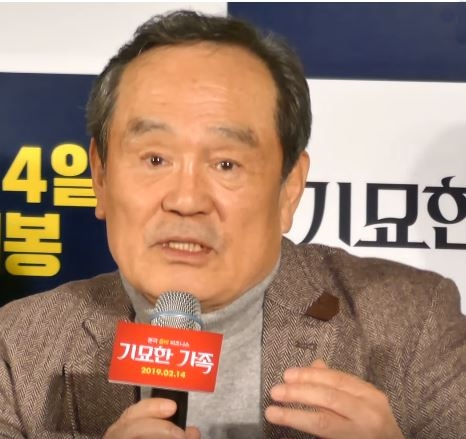
- Park in May 2019
- Born: January 6, 1945 (age 81); Cheongju, Chūseihoku-dō (North Chungcheong Province), Korea, Empire of Japan
- Education: Chung-Ang University – Theatre and Film
- Occupation: Actor
- Years active: 1965–present
- Agent: Beat Interactive
- Spouse: Kim Gil-in (m. 1976)
- Honours: Bogwan Order of Cultural Merit (2021)

Korean name
- Hangul: 박인환
- Hanja: 朴仁煥
- RR: Bak Inhwan
- MR: Pak Inhwan

Park In-hwan (born January 6, 1945) is a South Korean actor.

== Career ==
Park In-hwan was born in Cheongju, North Chungcheong Province, in 1945, as the eldest of three sons and one daughter. In 1964, He enrolled in 6th cohort of Chung-Ang University's Department of Theater and Film. He developed his acting skills there. During the second semester of his third year, he enlisted in the military. While he was serving, his father died from stomach cancer, leading his mother to advise him to transfer to a more practical department for a stable job.

After his discharge, he joined the Gagyo theater troupe in January 1969, beginning his professional acting career. He performed in over 100 plays, including Foolish Fortune-telling, The Traveling Theater Troupe, and Good People. His stage work earned him critical acclaim, including the Best Acting Award at the 1978 Republic of Korea Theater Festival, the Dong-A Theater Award for Best Male Acting in 1981, and the Baeksang Arts Award for Best Male Acting in 1984. He also served as the head of Gagyo for two terms (1979-1984 and 1985-1991).

To support his family, he transitioned into television in 1975 with MBC's 113 Investigation Headquarters. He gained prominence in roles such as Park Sung-chul in Now in Pyongyang and Keitetsu Genso in Five Hundred Years of Joseon Dynasty - Imjin War. He achieved stardom in 1989 as Pil-yong (Wang Lung) in The Wang Lung Family.

His film career began in the 1990s, and he has since maintained an active presence across various media. He consistently emphasizes theater as his foundational acting "hometown." Known for portraying father role (often with Baek Il-seop), he has also played villains. In historical dramas, he typically appears as the main character's father, often with an early retirement from the plot. In 2021, he achieved renewed popularity with his role as Deok-chul, a 70-year-old aspiring ballet dancer, in Navillera.

== Personal life ==
Park met his future wife, Kim Gil-in, in early summer 1974. Their first meeting was arranged by a mutual theater company friend when Kim, an S Magazine reporter, visited for her magazine feature article. They met again when Kim saw Park perform in Chuncheon, invited by the same friend. Their third encounter was as partners at a Christmas and year-end party at Dobongsanjang. Park initiated their first date, reaching out via their mutual friend. In the spring of 1976, they got married.

== Filmography ==
=== Film ===
Year	Title	Role	Notes	Ref.
1990	I Stand Everyday	Boss Yook		
1990	Well, Let's Look at the Sky Sometimes	Young-soo's father		
1990	Young-shim	Father		
1991	Milk Chocolate 1950-1990	Seo Pan-sool		
1991	Teenage Coup de grâce			
1993	When Adam Opens His Eyes	Audio master		
1995	Millions in My Account	Jeon Dal-soo's father		
1997	Baby Sale	Sang-joon's father		
1998	Two Cops 3	Detective Lee Hyeong-gu's father		
1998	The Quiet Family	Kang Dae-goo		
1999	The Spy	Mr. Oh		
2000	Weathering the Storms	Father		
2000	Just Do It!	Relative of the family (cameo)		
2001	Prison World Cup	Director Jang		
2001	One Fine Spring Day	Sang-woo's father		
2002	Oh! LaLa Sisters	Kim Il-dong		
2002	Sex of Magic	Park Sung-bin's father		
2004	Two Guys	Director Lee (cameo)		
2006	Moodori	Gu Bong-gi		
2007	Happiness	Seok-gu (cameo)		
2009	Thirst	Priest Roh		
2009	Fly, Penguin	Elder Kwon		
2009	The Executioner	Prison officer Kim		
2009	The Righteous Thief	Hong Man-seok		
2014	Miss Granny	Mr. Park		
2017	Lucid Dream	Seong-pil		
2019	The Odd Family: Zombie on Sale	Man-deok		
2019	Exit	Jang-soo		
2022	Kingmaker	Kang In-san		
TBA	Unexpected Love			

=== Television series ===
Year	Title	Role	Notes	Ref.
1965	The Long Voyage Home			
1981	1st Republic	Lee Seung-yeop		
1984	MBC Bestseller Theater – "30-Day Picnic"			
1986	MBC Bestseller Theater – "Bird in Flight Again"	Monk		
1987	MBC Bestseller Theater – "Rain Shower"			
1989	Wang Rung's Kin	Pil-yong		
1989	For the Emperor			
1989	2nd Republic	Kim Yeong-seon		
1989	The 5th Column	Director Park		
1989	The Region of Calm	Yoo Jin-san		
1990	My Sister, Mong-sil	Mr. Kim		
1991	Our Paradise	Psychology professor, Jin-soo and Seung-mi's father		
1991	Land of Thirst	Boss Choi		
1991	Middle Class in Words	Kim Dal-guk		
1991	Tingling Fingertips			
1991	Eyes of Dawn	Private Gu Bo-da		
1992	MBC Best Theater – "The Era of Passion"			
1992	Rainbow in Mapo	Park Geo-se		
1993	January	Kim Jin-gu		
1993	Our Hot Song	Jae-hee's father		
1993	Han River Cuckoo	Friend of Han Sang-pil's parents		
1993	Mountain Wind	Hong Jeong-gi		
1993	Love Is Living			
1994	MBC Best Theater – "What Are You Afraid About Turning Fifty"			
1994	What Have You Done Yet	Dong Ki-ho		
1995	Asphalt Man	Elder Kang		
1995	You Said You Loved Me			
1995	Hopefully the Sky	Deok-bae		
1996	Pretty Woman	Han Seok-bong		
1996	1.5	Seok-hyun's father		
1996	Ganyiyeok	Choi Seung-don		
1996	First Love			
1996	Im Kkeok-jeong	Im Dol-yi		
1997	MBC Best Theater – "Crying Crow"	Mr. Ji		
1997	Beyond the Horizon	Park Du-chil		
1997	A Bluebird Has It	Director Baek's father		
1997	MBC Best Theater – "Please Stop by the Laundromat"			
1998	Homecoming, a Short Story	Detective Min		
1998	MBC Best Theater – "Pensive Bodhisattva"	Director Jang		
1998	For the Sake of Love	Kang Tae-bong		
1998	Love on a Jujube Tree			
1998	Legendary Ambition			
1998	Dreaming of Christmas			
1998	Advocate	Kim Kang-jin		
1999	Young Sun	Kang Tae-ho		
1999	Beautiful Secret			
1999	KBS TV Novel – "My Older Sister's Mirror"			
2000	Wang Rung's Land	Wang Rung		
2001	Orient Theatre	Moon Soo-il		
2001	Like Father, Unlike Son	Choi Bok-dal		
2001	The Merchant	Hong Deuk-joo		
2002	Sidestreet People	Park Paeng-jo		
2002	To Be with You	Choi In-seok		
2002	Confession	Boss Choi		
2002	My Platoon Leader	Master Sergeant Lee		
2003	Into the Sun	Jeon Joon-oh		
2003	Near to You	Principal Cha		
2003	Land of Wine	Lee Jin-pyeong		
2003	Good Person	Oh Dong-chul		
2003	South of the Sun	Noh Young-man		
2003	Briar Flower	Min Dae-sik		
2004	Say You Love Me	Seo Pil-sang		
2004	My Hidden Love	Jung Il-hyun		
2004	Hyung (My Older Brother)	Ji Sang-tae		
2004	Save the Last Dance for Me	Ji Eun-soo's father		
2004	Emperor of the Sea	Jang Bogo's father	Cameo	
2005	Drama City – "Chin Up, Dad!"	Byung-ho's father		
2005	Be Strong, Geum-soon!	Director Noh		
2005	Hello My Teacher	Hwang Gap-soo		
2005	5th Republic	Jeong Seung-hwa		
2005	Tears of Diamond	Chairman Jin Sang-jin		
2005	A Love to Kill	Cha Du-yong		
2005	Drama City – "Like a Dream"	Jung-yoon's father		
2005	HDTV Literature – "Saya Saya (Bird, Bird)"	Mr. Na		
2006	Famous Princesses	Na Yang-pal		
2006	Yeon Gaesomun	Yeon Taejo		
2006	Lovers	Reverend Yoon		
2007	Hello! Miss	Hwang Man-bok		
2007	War of Money	Seo In-chul		
2007	Daughters-in-Law	Lee Soo-gil		
2007	First Wives' Club	Lee Hwa-sang		
2007	Drama City – "Ugly You"	Park Oh-chul		
2008	My Precious You	Jang Il-nam		
2009	Three Brothers	Kim Soon-kyung		
2009	Enjoy Life	Hong Man-bok		
2010	It's Okay, Daddy's Girl	Eun Ki-hwan		
2011	Believe in Love	Kim Soo-bong		
2011	You're So Pretty	Go Man-seok		
2011	Bravo, My Love!	Byun Choon-nam		
2011	My One and Only	Lee Pil-yong		
2012	The Sons	Yoo Won-tae		
2013	One Well-Raised Daughter	Jang Pan-ro		
2014	4 Legendary Witches	Park Yi-moon		
2016	Come Back Mister	Kim Noh-gap		
2017	Mad Dog	Byun Gook-jin		
2019	Liver or Die	Kan Bo-goo		
2020	Brilliant Heritage	Boo Young-bae		
2021	Navillera	Shim Deok-chul		
2021	Lost	Chang-sook		
2021	School 2021	Gong Young-soo		
2022	It's Beautiful Now	Lee Kyeong-cheol		
2024	Iron Family	Lee Man-deuk		

=== Web series ===
Year	Title	Role	Notes	Ref.
2023	One Day Off	Grandfather	Cameo	

=== Variety show ===
Year	Title	Notes	Ref.
1990	Mysterious World of Quiz Exploration		

== Theater ==
Year	Title	Role	Reprised
	The Money Bug: Outdoor Play		
	The Tempest		
	A Man for All Seasons		
	A Good Person		
	Antigone		
	The Wandering Troupe		
	The Cherry Orchard		
	Porgy and Bess		
1994	Guys and Dolls	Nathan Detroit	
1995	The Fantasticks		
1996	Ttaraji's Banquet		
1998	Tumen River of Tears		
1999	An Inn Without an Address		
2001	Fallen Pagoda of Love		
2002	Heartbreaking Miari Hill		
2005	Song of Katusa		
2008	Scent of Love	Kang-soo	
2009	Rain Falling in Gomoryeong		2010, 2011
2010	Crossing the Bakdaljae Pass in Tears		
2011	Tuscany in Seoul	Seo Joo-hyuk	

== Accolades ==
=== Awards and nominations ===
Year	Award	Category	Nominated work	Result
1978	2nd Korea Theatre Festival	Best Actor	The Tempest	Won
1980	MBC Drama Awards	Excellence Award, Actor		Won
1981	18th Dong-A Theatre Awards	Best Actor	The Cherry Orchard	Won
1984	20th Baeksang Arts Awards	Best Theater Actor	A Good Person	Won
1989	KBS Drama Awards	Excellence Award, Actor	The Region of Calm	Won
1990	MBC Drama Awards	Excellence Award, Actor	My Sister, Mong-sil	Won
2000	SBS Drama Awards	Top Excellence Award, Actor	Wang Rung's Land	Won
2006	KBS Drama Awards	Top Excellence Award, Actor	Famous Princesses	Nominated
2007	KBS Drama Awards	Excellence Award, Actor in a One-Act/Special/Short Drama	Ugly You	Won
2010	KBS Drama Awards	Excellence Award, Actor in a Daily Drama	Three Brothers	Nominated
2020	KBS Drama Awards	Top Excellence Award, Actor	Brilliant Heritage	Won
2022	KBS Drama Awards	Excellence Award, Actor in a Serial Drama	It's Beautiful Now	Nominated

=== State honors ===
List of state honour(s)
State	Award Ceremony	Year	Honor	Ref.
South Korea	Korean Popular Culture and Arts Awards (Note: Since 2010 Honors are given at the Korean Popular Culture and Arts Awards, arranged by the Korea Creative Content Agency and hosted by the Ministry of Culture, Sports and Tourism.)	2021	Order of Cultural Merit	
