= South Korean humidifier disinfectant case =

Lung disease outbreak in South Korea

- Hangul: 가습기 살균제 사건
- Hanja: 加濕器 殺菌劑 事件
- RR: Gaseupgi salgyunje sageon
- MR: Kasŭpki salgyunje sakŏn

The South Korean humidifier disinfectant case was an outbreak of lung diseases in South Korea, caused by chemicals contained in dozens of humidifier disinfectants.

== Outbreak ==
The outbreak was detected in children between 2006 and 2011, and in adults in the spring of 2011. The mortality rate in children was 58 percent, while among adults, 53 percent died or required lung transplants. Autopsies and epidemiological work, followed up by animal studies, led the South Korean CDC to identify the cause as the chemicals polyhexamethylene guanidine (PHMG), chloromethylchloroisothiazolinone (CMIT), methylisothiazolinone (MIT), and oligo(2-(2-ethoxy)-ethoxyethyl)guanidinium-chloride (PGH) used in humidifier disinfectants.

== Investigation ==
The main cause of the lung diseases was found to be four chemicals in Korean humidifier cleaners:

1. polyhexamethylene guanidine (PHMG)
2. oligo(2-(2-ethoxy)-ethoxyethyl)guanidinium-chloride (PGH)
3. chloromethylchloroisothiazolinone (CMIT)
4. methylisothiazolinone (MIT)

Experiments by the South Korean government found PHMG and PGH resulted in pulmonary toxicity when inhaled as a vapor. PHMG and PGH caused pulmonary fibrosis in animal experiments. On November 11, 2011, six humidifier disinfectants containing PHMG and PGH were recalled. PHMG and PGH were banned in 2011.

The Korea Centers for Disease Control and Prevention did not find a causal relationship between CMIT and MIT in humidifier disinfectants and pulmonary fibrosis. This result did not mean that CMIT and MIT were safe, as the chemicals were found to affect the brain and skin to varying degrees. At least five victims used CMIT or MIT-based humidifier disinfectants.

The South Korean government officially recognized 1,814 dead and 7,837 injured victims. The national Social Disasters Commission estimated that, including unreported cases, there were an average of 20,366 deaths (range: 18,801–21,931), 950,000 cases of non-fatal medical harm (range: 870,000–1,020,000), and 8.94 million exposures (range: 8,250,000–9,630,000) that occurred between 1994 and 2011 due to PHMG alone.

The humidifier disinfectant product with the largest amount of victims with 221 confirmed deaths and 300 confirmed injured was Reckitt Benckiser's humidifier disinfectant Oxy Ssak Ssak (옥시싹싹), which led the British firm to dozens of court indictments in the years following 2011, still continuing to this day. In May 2016, the Korean division chief apologized to victims and families in a press conference and offered compensation to the families of those who died or were injured; it was the first time the company had acknowledged that its products containing PHMG were harmful.

At the humidifier disinfectant disaster fact-finding hearing held on August 28, 2019, a service report from the Ministry of Environment was released stating that LG Household & Health Care's humidifier disinfectant, 119 Humidifier Disinfectant (119가습기살균제), made from benzalkonium chloride (BKC) causes health damage from inhalation toxicity. It was the third-most popular humidifier disinfectant product in Korea, with 1.1 million sold.

== See also ==
- Fan death
- Reckitt Benckiser
