= The Great Show =

2019 South Korean television series

- Promotional poster
- Hangul: 위대한 쇼
- RR: Widaehan syo
- MR: Widaehan syo
- Genre: Family; Political; Comedy
- Developed by: Studio Dragon
- Written by: Seol Jun-seok
- Directed by: Shin Yong-hwi
- Starring: Song Seung-heon; Lee Sun-bin; Lim Ju-hwan
- Music by: Lim Ha-young (CP)
- Country of origin: South Korea
- Original language: Korean
- No. of episodes: 16

Production
- Executive producers: Cha Won-chun; Jay Sung-beom Ji
- Running time: 70 minutes
- Production companies: Huayi Brothers; Lotte Cultureworks
- Budget: ₩8.9 billion

Original release
- Network: tvN
- Release: August 26 – October 15, 2019

The Great Show (Korean: 위대한 쇼; RR: Widaehan syo (Note: The series' title can also be interpreted as Wi Dae-han's Show, in reference to the main character, whose name is a homophone of the word "great".)) is a 2019 South Korean television series starring Song Seung-heon, Lee Sun-bin, and Lim Ju-hwan. It aired on tvN on Mondays and Tuesdays at 21:30 (KST) from August 26 to October 15, 2019.

== Synopsis ==
Wi Dae-han (Song Seung-heon) is a former politician who took in a young girl and her three siblings when their mother died. Together, they grew as a family and put on 'the great show' for him to become a politician again. Jung Soo-hyun (Lee Sun-bin) is his junior in college and a current affairs writer with a sense of justice.

== Cast ==
=== Main ===
- Song Seung-heon as Wi Dae-han: A snobbish 'former' Member of Parliament who decides to cosplay his father to regain his parliamentary title.
  - Lee Do-hyun as young Dae-han (ep. 1–3)
  - Kim Gun-woo as child Dae-han
- Lee Sun-bin as Jung Soo-hyun
- Lim Ju-hwan as Kang Joon-ho

=== Supporting ===
==== People around Wi Dae-han ====
- Roh Jeong-eui as Han Da-jung
- Jung Joon-won as Han Tak
- Kim Joon as Han Tae-poong
- Park Ye-na as Han Song-yi
- Han Sang-hyuk as Choi Jung-woo
- Yoo Seung-mok as Wi Dae-han's father (ep. 1, 3)
- Choi Su-rin as Dae-han's stepmother

==== People around Jung Soo-hyun ====
- Lee Won-jong as Jung Jong-chul
- Kim Hyun as Yang Mi-sook
- Kang Eun-ah as Jung Ji-hyun

==== People around Kang Joon-ho ====
- Son Byong-ho as Kang Kyung-hoon
- Woo Hyun-joo as Park Soo-ji

==== Political and Media people ====
- Kim Dong-young as Ko Bong-joo
- Lee Jin-kwon as Loan Shark
- Park Ha-na as Kim Hye-jin
- Yoo Sung-joo as Jung Han-soo
- Yoo Jang-young as PD Koo
- Song Ji-hyun as Writer Ahn
- Pyo Hye-rim as Writer Ma

== Original soundtrack ==
The Great Show OST

Soundtrack album
- Released: 2019
- Genre: Soundtrack
- Languages: Korean; English
- Label: Stone Music Entertainment

=== Part 1 ===
Released on September 9, 2019
No.	Title	Lyrics	Music	Artist	Length
1.	"Wing It!"	Kim Ho-kyung	1601	Son Ho-young; Kim Tae-woo	3:06
2.	"Wing It!" (Inst.)		1601		3:06
Total length:					6:12

=== Part 2 ===
Released on September 17, 2019
No.	Title	Lyrics	Music	Artist	Length
1.	"Sad Night" (아픈 밤)	Lundi Blues	Hen	Lee Sun-bin	3:46
2.	"Sad Night" (Inst.)		Hen		3:46
Total length:					7:32

=== Part 3 ===
Released on September 25, 2019
No.	Title	Lyrics	Music	Artist	Length
1.	"You, Me and Dream" (너.나.꿈)	Park Woo-sang	Park Woo-sang	Hyuk	3:11
2.	"You, Me and Dream" (Inst.)		Park Woo-sang		3:11
Total length:					6:22

=== Part 4 ===
Released on October 1, 2019
No.	Title	Lyrics	Music	Artist	Length
1.	"Wait For You" (오지 않는 널)	DOKO	DOKO	Haebin (Gugudan)	3:45
2.	"Wait For You" (Inst.)		DOKO		3:45
Total length:					7:30

== Viewership ==
The Great Show : South Korea viewers per episode (thousands)

Season	Episode number																Average
Season	1	2	3	4	5	6	7	8	9	10	11	12	13	14	15	16	Average
1	717	715	692	693	519	701	601	623	539	565	479	618	588	604	537	750	621

Source: Audience measurement performed nationwide by Nielsen Media Research.

Average TV viewership ratings
Ep.	Original broadcast date	Average audience share (AGB Nielsen)	
Ep.	Original broadcast date	Nationwide	Seoul
1	August 26, 2019	3.056%	3.223%
2	August 27, 2019	2.941%	3.574%
3	September 2, 2019	3.037%	3.154%
4	September 3, 2019	2.966%	3.475%
5	September 9, 2019	2.467%	2.834%
6	September 10, 2019	2.779%	2.907%
7	September 16, 2019	2.529%	2.673%
8	September 17, 2019	2.708%	2.586%
9	September 23, 2019	2.234%	2.167%
10	September 24, 2019	2.143%	2.128%
11	September 30, 2019	2.019%	2.180%
12	October 1, 2019	2.365%	2.427%
13	October 7, 2019	2.316%	2.542%
14	October 8, 2019	2.681%	2.800%
15	October 14, 2019	2.089%	1.998%
16	October 15, 2019	3.243%	3.269%
Average		2.598%	2.746%
In the table above, the blue numbers represent the lowest ratings and the red numbers represent the highest ratings.; This drama aired on a cable channel/pay TV which normally has a relatively smaller audience compared to free-to-air TV/public broadcasters (KBS, SBS, MBC and EBS).
