= Humidifier =

Device that increases humidity

A humidifier is a household appliance or device designed to increase the moisture level in the air within a room or an enclosed space. It achieves this by emitting water droplets or steam into the surrounding air, thereby raising the humidity.

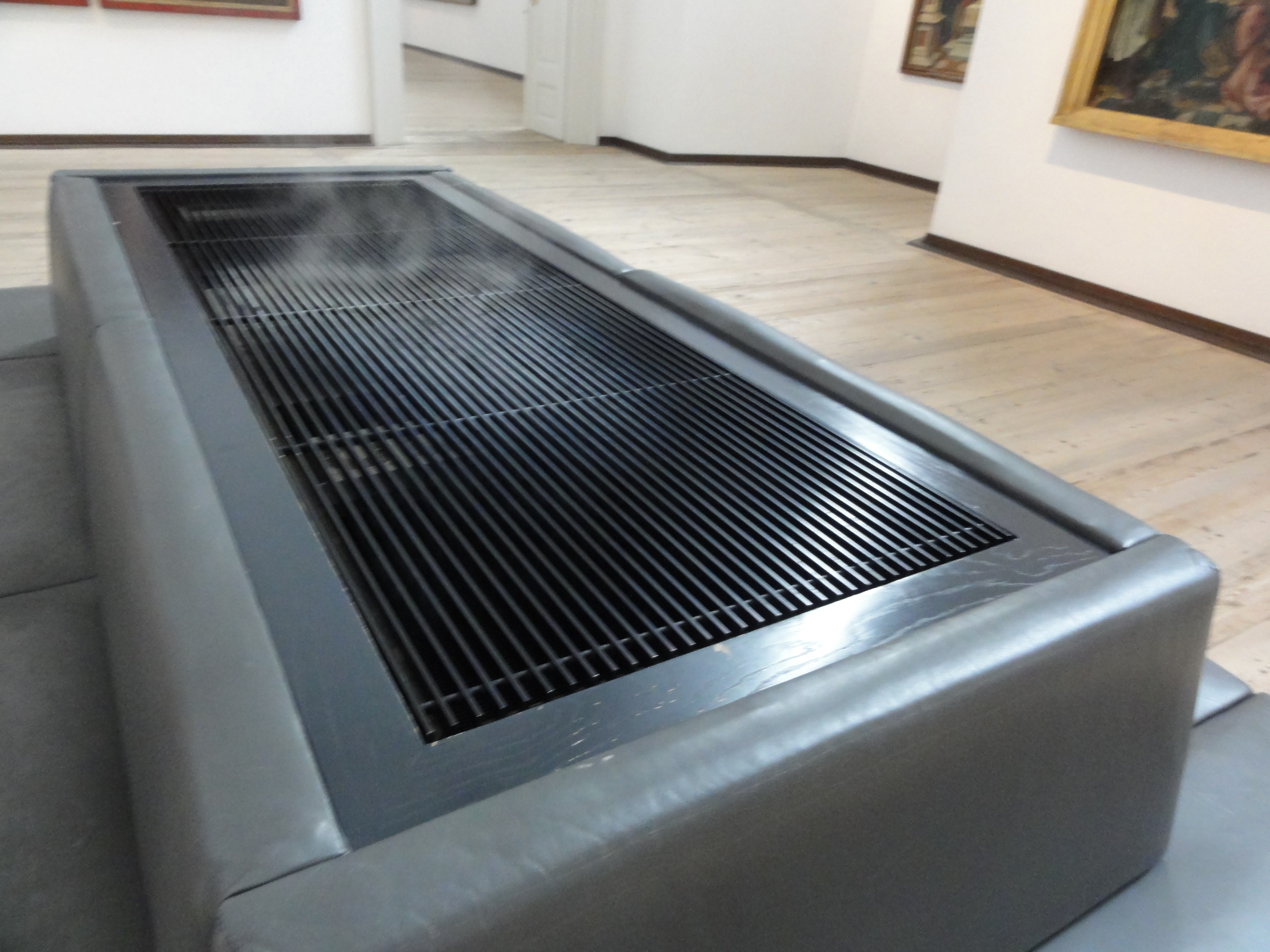
Humidifier in an art museum in Augsburg, Germany

In the home, point-of-use humidifiers are commonly used to humidify a single room, while whole-house or furnace humidifiers, which connect to a home's HVAC system, provide humidity to the entire house. Medical ventilators often include humidifiers for increased patient comfort. Large humidifiers are used in commercial, institutional, or industrial contexts, often as part of a larger HVAC system.

== Overview ==
=== Humidification calculation ===
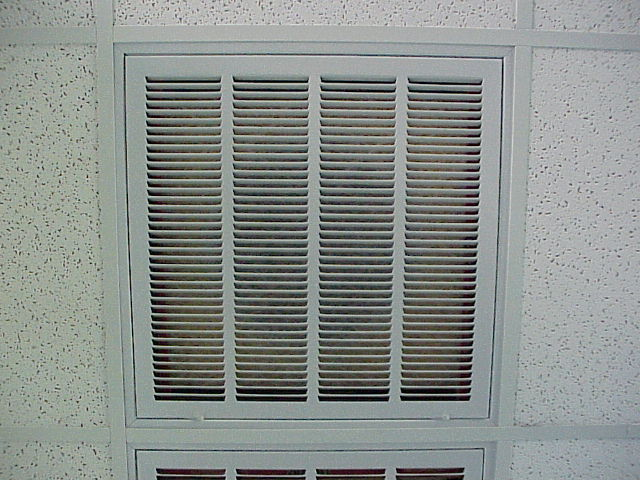
Ventilation determines most of the air changes per hour in a space without windows.

Humidity per hour: X = Air changes per hour (ACPH) * M³ * density of air * humidity ratio

Humidity per day: X * 24

- The air changes per hour (ACPH) ranges widely, based on:
  - Ventilation: Values may be obtained from the HVAC maintainer that routinely (typically every third year or so) tests the ventilation of the residence.
  - Insulation leakage: Measured with a standard blower door test.
- Cubic meters: The volume of the room, excluding the bathroom that should be kept closed since it ventilates humidity.
- Density of air: Typically 1.2 kg/m^{3} for dry air.
- Humidity
  - Current relative humidity: 20%
  - Humidity needed to reach 55%: 35%
    - Humidity ratio for 35%: 0.0051

For example, a typical modern apartment of 50 m^{2} (540 sq ft) with closed windows (wood isolation) may consume 36.72 litres per day (9.70 U.S. gallons per day) to raise the relative humidity from 20% to 55%:

24 * 1.53 L/h (2 * 1 × 125 m^{3} × 1.2 kg/m^{3} × 0.0051):

- Air changes per hour
  - Ventilation: 2
  - Insulation leakage: 1 (a few windows)
- Cubic meters: 125 m^{3} (50 m^{2} * 2.5 m height)
- Density of air: Typically 1.2 kg/m^{3} for dry air.
- Humidity
  - Current relative humidity: 20%
  - Humidity needed to reach 55%: 35%
    - Humidity ratio for 35%: 0.0051

=== Prevention of low indoor humidity ===
Low humidity may occur in hot, dry desert climates, or indoors in artificially heated spaces. In winter, especially when cold outside air is heated indoors, the humidity may drop to as low as 10–20%. A relative humidity of 30% to 50% is recommended for most homes.

==== Health treatment ====
- Prevention of dermatitis: Low humidity can cause adverse health effects and may cause atopic dermatitis, and seborrhoeic dermatitis.
  - Management of hair loss: Commonly, patients with seborrhoeic dermatitis experience mild redness, scaly skin lesions and in some cases hair loss.
- Prevention of dry mucous membranes and cough: drying out mucous membranes such as the lining of the nose and throat may lead to a snoring problem, and can cause respiratory distress.
- Prevention of dry eye syndrome.
- Improved apparent temperature: The heat index and humidex measure the effect of humidity on the perception of temperatures above +27 °C (81 °F). In humid conditions, the air feels much hotter, because less perspiration evaporates from the skin.

==== Improved climate for material ====
Low humidity can affect wooden furniture, causing shrinkage and loose joints or cracking of pieces. Books, papers, and artworks may shrink or warp and become brittle in very low humidity.

In addition, static electricity may become a problem in conditions of low humidity, destroying semiconductor devices, causing static cling of textiles, and causing dust and small particles to stick stubbornly to electrically charged surfaces.

=== Negative impact of overuse of humidifiers ===
An indoor relative humidity of less than 51% resulted in significant reductions in mite and allergen levels. Overuse of a humidifier can raise the relative humidity to excessive levels, promoting the growth of dust mites and mold, and can also cause hypersensitivity pneumonitis (humidifier lung). A properly installed and located hygrostat should be used to monitor and control humidity levels automatically, or a well-informed and conscientious human operator must constantly check for correct humidity levels.

A humidity below 50% can prevent water condensation on building materials.

A dehumidifier can be used to balance the humidity.

== Humidifiers ==
Industrial humidifiers are used when a specific humidity level must be maintained to prevent static electricity buildup, preserve material properties, and ensure a comfortable and healthy environment for workers or residents.

Static problems are prevalent in industries such as packaging, printing, paper, plastics, textiles, electronics, automotive manufacturing and pharmaceuticals. Friction can produce static buildup and sparks when humidity is below 45% relative humidity (RH). Between 45% and 55% RH, static builds up at reduced levels, while humidity above 55% RH ensures that static will never build up. The American Society of Heating, Refrigerating and Air Conditioning Engineers (ASHRAE) has traditionally recommended a range of 45–55% RH in data centers to prevent sparks that can damage IT equipment. Humidifiers are also used by manufacturers of semiconductors and in hospital operating rooms.

Printers and paper manufacturers use humidifiers to prevent shrinkage and paper curl. Humidifiers are needed in cold storage rooms to preserve the freshness of food against the dryness caused by hot temperatures. Art museums use humidifiers to protect sensitive works of art, especially in exhibition galleries, where they combat the dryness caused by heating for the comfort of visitors during winter.

== Natural humidifiers ==
Natural humidifiers don't use or need a demineralization filter because the water is slowly evaporated which leaves the mineral deposit at the bottom of the container. However, natural humidifiers raise the humidity very slowly even if their water surface area is large.

=== Common sources ===
- Human water losses, both respiratory, and insensible water loss like sweat, range in average 0.75 L/d in sedentary adults. However, most people do not spend most of the day at home.
- Houseplants may also be used as natural humidifiers, especially if they are placed in fabric flowerpots, since they evaporate water into the air through transpiration. Care must still be taken to prevent bacteria or mold in the soil from growing to excessive levels, or from dispersing into the air. The presence of sciarids (like fungus gnats) in houseplants may indicate overwatering.
- Hanging laundry will increase the humidity.

=== Homemade ===
One type of evaporative humidifier makes use of just a reservoir and wick. Sometimes called a "natural humidifier", these are usually non-commercial devices that can be assembled at little or no cost.

One version of a natural humidifier uses a stainless steel bowl, partially filled with water, covered by a towel. A waterproof weight is used to sink the towel in the center of the bowl. There is no need for a fan, because the water spreads through the towel by capillary action and the towel surface area is large enough to provide for rapid evaporation. The stainless steel bowl is much easier to clean than typical humidifier water tanks. This, in combination with daily or every other day replacement of the towel and periodic laundering, can control the problem of mold and bacteria.

== Electric humidifiers ==
=== Evaporative humidifiers ===
An "evaporative", "cool moisture", or "wick humidifier", consists of just three basic parts: a reservoir, a wick, and a fan.

The wick is made of a porous material that absorbs water from the reservoir and provides a larger surface area for it to evaporate from. The fan is adjacent to the wick and blows air onto the wet wick to aid in the evaporation of the water. Evaporation from the wick is dependent on relative humidity. A room with low humidity will have a higher evaporation rate compared to a room with high humidity. Therefore, this type of humidifier is partially self-regulating; as the humidity of the room increases, the water vapor output naturally decreases.

These wicks become moldy if they are not dried out completely between fillings, and become saturated with mineral deposits over time. They regularly need rinsing or replacement; if this does not happen, air cannot pass through them, and humidifier stops humidifying the area it is in and the water in the tank remains at the same level.

Evaporative humidifiers function similarly to evaporative coolers.

=== Impeller humidifiers ===
Impeller humidifiers (a type of cool mist humidifier) are usually noisier than others. It uses a rotating disc to fling water at a diffuser, which breaks the water into fine droplets that float into the air. The water supply must be kept scrupulously clean, or there is a risk of spreading bacteria or mold into the air.

=== Ultrasonic humidifiers ===
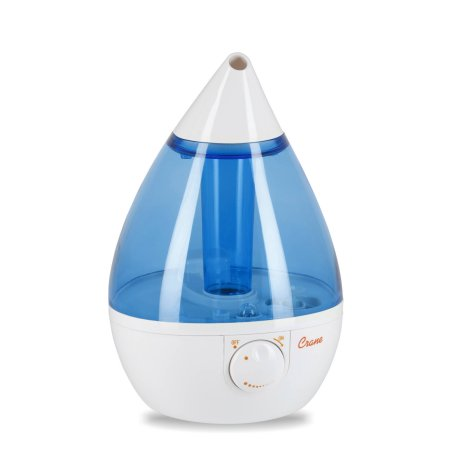
Ultrasonic Cool Mist Humidifier

An ultrasonic humidifier uses a ceramic diaphragm vibrating at an ultrasonic frequency to create water droplets that silently exit the humidifier in the form of cool fog. Usually the mist gets forced out by a tiny fan, while some ultra mini models have no fans. The models without fans are meant mainly for personal use. Ultrasonic humidifiers use a piezoelectric transducer to create a high frequency (1-2 MHz) mechanical oscillation in a film of water. This forms an extremely fine mist of droplets about one micron in diameter, that is quickly evaporated into the air flow.

Unlike the humidifiers that boil water, these water droplets will contain any impurities that are in the reservoir, including minerals from hard water (which then forms a difficult-to-remove sticky white dust on nearby objects and furniture). Any pathogens growing in the stagnant tank will also be dispersed in the air. Ultrasonic humidifiers should be cleaned regularly to prevent bacterial contamination from being spread throughout the air.

The amount of minerals and other materials can be greatly reduced by using distilled water. Special disposable demineralization cartridges may also reduce the amount of airborne material, but the EPA warns, "the ability of these devices to remove minerals may vary widely." The mineral dust may have negative health effects. Wick humidifiers trap the mineral deposits in the wick; vaporizer types tend to collect minerals on or around the heating element and require regular cleaning with vinegar or citric acid to control buildup.

=== Steam Humidifiers ===
Steam humidifiers, or warm mist humidifiers, are equipped with a heating element.

A medicated inhalant can also be added to the steam vapor to help reduce cough. Vaporizers may be healthier than cool mist types of humidifiers because steam is less likely to convey mineral impurities or microorganisms from the standing water in the reservoir. However, boiling water requires significantly more energy than other techniques. The heat source in poorly designed humidifiers can overheat, causing the product to melt, leak, and start fires.

==== Tanks ====
The water is usually supplied by manually filling the unit on a periodic basis.

Top fill: A top fill tank has a hole at the top to make it convenient to refill the tank on daily basis.

Bottom fill: Bottom filled humidifiers has removable water tank, often attached with a replaceable demineralization filter. Both the cap and the filter are often universal, which means that they can be switched between many tank cap humidifiers.

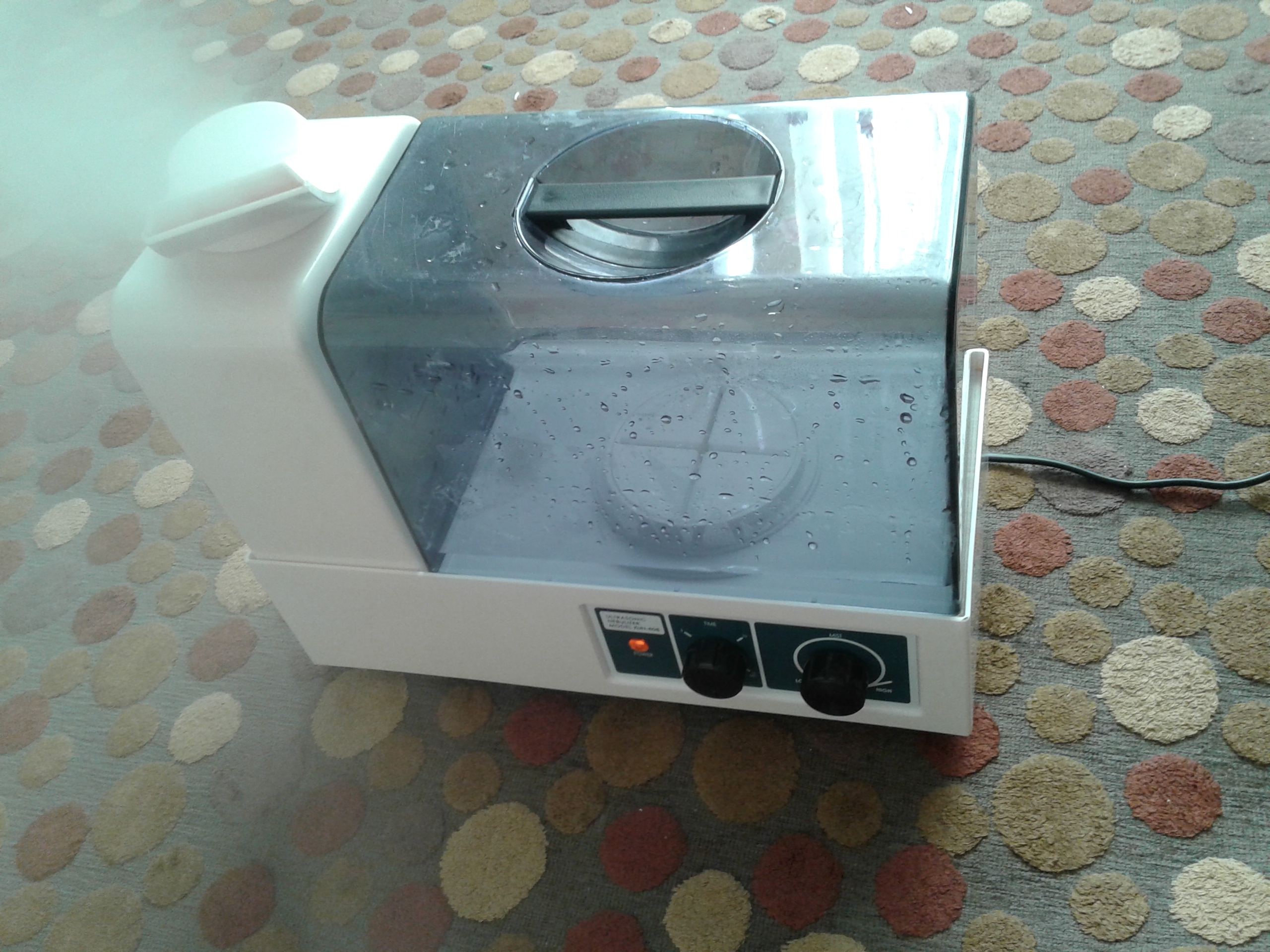
An ultrasonic humidifier with a bottom filled tank that has a replaceable demineralization unit (see inside bottom)

Tank cap-based humidifiers are more inconvenient to fill than top fill tanks, because the demineralization filter has to be unscrewed and screwed back on a daily basis. Also, water drops from the tank attachment may get in contact with the hygrometer, which will make it harder to operate properly if they are not operated with caution.

=== Cleaning ===
Ultrasonic wave nebulizers trap the mineral deposits over time, even if filters are used, and require cleaning with vinegar or citric acid to control buildup. It is easy to remove the buildup from the nebulizer in humidifiers with removable base parts. Other models must be screwed. Some models require monthly maintenance, while other models may run for years unmaintained.

==== Activated charcoal filter ====
Some humidifiers have an activated charcoal filter to reduce contaminants.

==== Demineralization filter ====
Humidity with mineral deposits build up on furniture, and static objects like computer monitors, TVs, etc.

Most models with heating elements come with replacement demineralization filters (cartridges, or plastic foam, for the tank, and fabric near the heater in the reservoir) to reduce the amount of minerals entering the system. The cost of these filters is about $10–15 per cartridge or 10-pack for plastic foam, or fabric filters. Cartridges may last for 6 months, and plastic foam/fabric filters may last one month, if the humidifier is frequently used. Cartridges can be used for most humidifiers, but some models have a proprietary format.

Some humidifiers (for example, some cold mist humidifiers) don't come with any filters at all.

Clogged filters should be replaced when they cannot deliver water, which is indicated with a "no water" icon/alert signal in modern humidifiers. A manual way to figure out if a filter is clogged is to shake it, if the content of it (even if wet) doesn't move around, then it's unlikely that sufficient water will pass through.

==== Ultraviolet germicidal irradiation (UVGI) ====
Some humidifiers have an integrated ultraviolet germicidal irradiation (UVGI) feature.

==== Water ionizer ====
Some humidifiers have an integrated water ionizer.

=== Maintenance ===
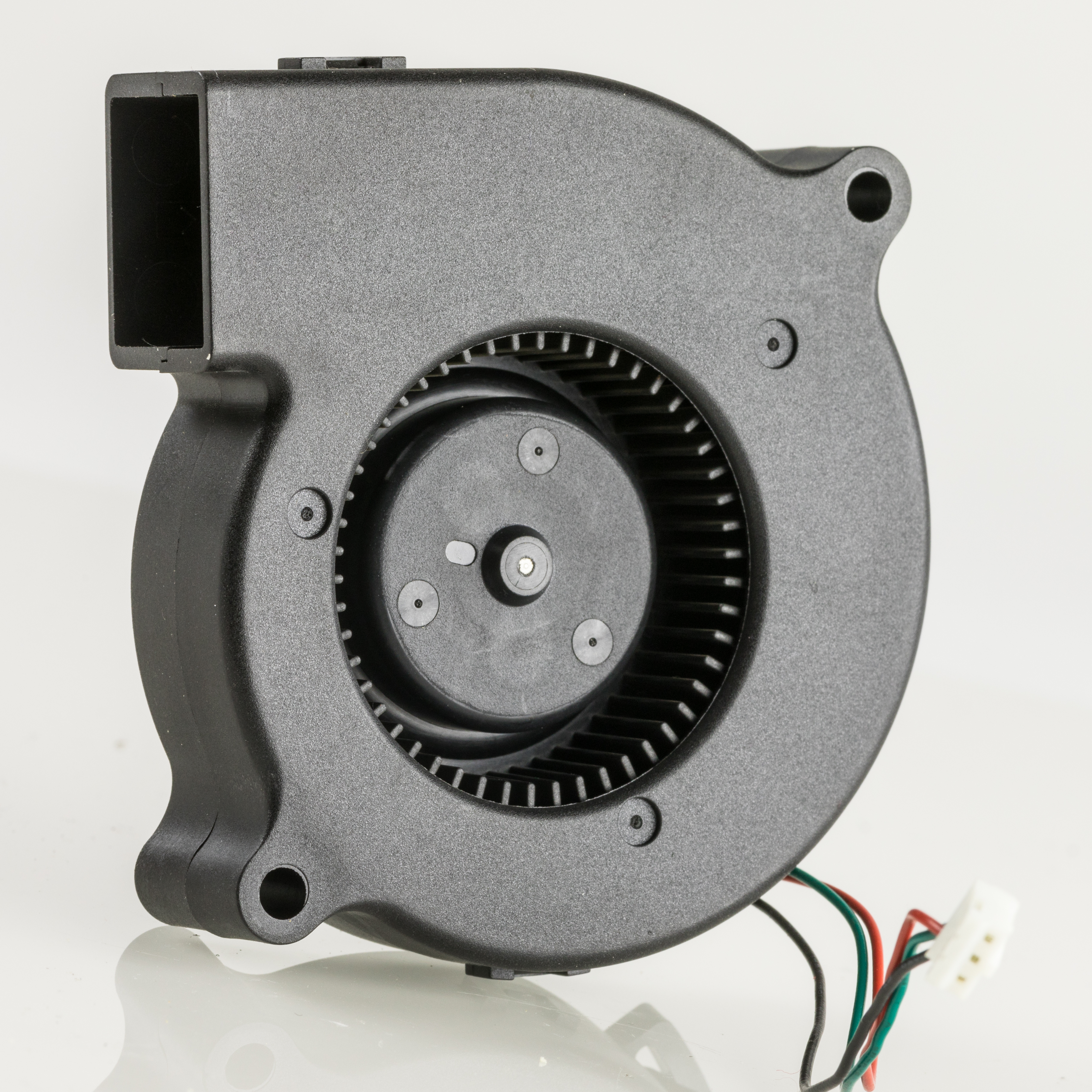
A typical centrifugal fan found inside ultrasonic humidifiers.

A torx screwdriver is often needed to open consumer electronics.

Humidifiers with a centrifugal fan may become noisy due to build up which cannot effectively be removed with vinegar for example. However, the fan can be replaced, and the model name of the fan and its specifications can be figured out by disassembling the humidifier and detaching it.

== Fixed-installation humidifiers ==
For buildings with a forced-air furnace, a humidifier may be installed into the furnace. They can also protect wooden objects, antiques and other furnishings which may be sensitive to damage from overly dry air. In colder months, they may provide modest energy savings, since as humidity increases, occupants may feel warm at a lower temperature.

Bypass humidifiers are connected between the heated and cold air return ducts, using the pressure difference between these ducts to cause some heated air to make a bypass through the humidifier and return to the furnace.

Any humidifiers should usually be disabled during the summer months if air conditioning is used; air conditioners partially function to reducing indoor humidity, and having a humidifier continue to operate will waste significant amounts of energy.

=== Drums ===
Drum style (bypass) uses a pipe to bring water directly to a reservoir (a pan) attached to the furnace. The water level in the pan is controlled by a float valve, similar to a small toilet tank float. The wick is typically a foam pad mounted on a drum and attached to a small motor; hot air enters the drum at one end and is forced to leave through the sides of the drum. When the hygrostat calls for humidity, the motor is turned on causing the drum to rotate slowly through the pan of water and preventing the foam pad from drying out.

Advantages include:
- Low cost
- Inexpensive maintenance (drum-style pads are cheap and readily available)
Disadvantages include:
- Requirement for frequent (approximately monthly) inspections of cleanliness and pad condition
- Water evaporation even when humidification is not required (due to the pan of water which remains exposed to a high velocity air stream)
- Mold growth in the pan full of water (this problem is exacerbated by the large quantity of air, inevitably carrying mold spores, passing through the humidifier whether in use or not).

For the latter reason especially, drum-style humidifiers should always be turned off at the water supply during summer (air conditioning) months, and should always be used with high quality furnace air filters (MERV ratings as high as possible to ensure small numbers of mold spores reaching the humidifier pan) when the water supply is turned on.

=== Disc wheels ===
A disc wheel style (bypass) is very similar in design to the drum style humidifiers; this type of furnace humidifier replaces the foam drumming with a number of plastic discs with small grooves on both sides. This allows for a very large evaporative surface area, without requiring a great deal of space. Unlike the drum style humidifiers, the disc wheel does not need regular replacement.

Advantages include:
- Very low maintenance (basin of humidifier should be cleaned out periodically, unless an automatic flushing device is installed)
- No regular replacement of parts necessary
- Higher output due to large evaporative surface area
- Can be installed in hard water situations
- Maintains efficiency throughout lifespans

Disadvantages include:
- Higher price
- Water evaporation even when humidification is not required (due to the pan of water which remains exposed to a high velocity air stream)

=== Bypass flow-through ===
Bypass flow-through style (bypass – also known as "biscuit style" or many other, similar variant names) uses a pipe to bring water directly to an electrically controlled valve at the top of the humidifier. Air passes through an aluminum "biscuit" (often called a pad; the term "biscuit" emphasizes the solid rather than foamy form) which is similar to a piece of extremely coarse steel wool. The "biscuit" has a coating of a matte ceramic, resulting in an extremely large surface area within a small space. When the hygrostat calls for humidity, the valve is opened and causes a spray of water onto the "biscuit". Hot air is passed through the "biscuit", causing the water to evaporate from the pad and be carried into the building.

Advantages include:
- Reduced maintenance (new "biscuit" is needed only when clogged with dust or mineral deposits, typically once per year)
- Lack of a pan of potentially stagnant water to serve as a breeding ground for mold as with a drum-style humidifier
- No incidental humidification caused by a constantly replenished pan of water in a high velocity air stream
- Reduced requirement for expensive air filters
- Uses little electricity
Disadvantages include:
- A somewhat higher purchase price
- Manufacturer and model-specific replacement biscuits (versus the relatively generic drum-style pads) may be more expensive and difficult to find
- For most models, a portion of the water supplied to the unit is not evaporated. This can generate a considerable amount of waste water containing residual minerals, which does require connection to a drain. There is a limited selection of drain-less models that recirculate water, but mineral buildup must then be removed manually on a periodic basis.

=== Spray mist ===
Spray mist type uses a pipe, usually a small plastic one, to bring water directly to an electrically controlled valve (atomizer-this forces the water through a tiny orifice causing it to break up into tiny particles) in the humidifier. Water mist is sprayed directly into the supply air, and the mist is carried into the premises by the air flow.

Advantages include:
- Simpler than bypass types to install, requiring a single cut hole for installation, no additional ducting.
- Uses little electricity.
- Small, compact unit which fits where other types cannot. (Approximately 6 inches (15 cm) square.)
- Because it does not require bypass ducting it does not undermine the pressure separation (and therefore, blower efficiency) of the return and supply ducts.
- Does not require use of moisture pads (on-going expense).
- Highly efficient usage of water. Does not generate waste water, and does not require separate connection to a drain.
- Requires little maintenance. Periodic cleaning of nozzle may be required in hard water environments.
- Lack of a pan of potentially stagnant water to serve as a breeding ground for mold as with a drum-style humidifier.
Disadvantages include:
- Spray nozzle can become clogged in hard water situations, necessitating the use of water filter, periodic cleaning of nozzle, or nozzle replacement.
- Disperses any minerals in the water into the airstream.

== Invention ==
On May 25th, 1926, Max Katzman applied for a patent for the Electric Vaporizer, the first electric-powered steam humidifier. The patent was granted on May 17, 1927.

=== Additional types ===
There are many different types of Plant and Home Humidifiers which can help maintain the humidity level of the home as required. Additional types include non-bypass flow-through (fan augmented), steam, impeller or centrifugal atomizer, and under duct designs.

== Problems ==
The U.S. EPA provides detailed information about health risks as well as recommended maintenance procedures. If the tap water contains a lot of minerals (also known as "hard water") then the ultrasonic or impeller humidifiers will produce a "white dust" (calcium is the most common mineral in tap water) which usually settles onto furniture, and is attracted to static electricity generating devices such as CRT monitors. The white dust can be prevented by using distilled water, or a demineralization cartridge in ultrasonic humidifiers. Bottled waters labeled "natural", "artesian", or "spring" may still have their original mineral content. The EPA reports that ultrasonic and impeller humidifiers spread the most mineral deposits and microorganisms, while evaporative and steam humidifiers can allow the growth of microorganisms but generally disperse less of them into the air.

In addition, a stuck or malfunctioning water supply valve can deliver large amounts of water, causing extensive water damage if undetected for any period of time. A water alarm, possibly with an automatic water shutoff, can help prevent this malfunction from causing major problems.

From 2006 to 2011, the disinfectant polyhexamethylene guanidine and other toxic materials were used as a cleaning agent for humidifier water tanks in Korea, leading to severe lung disease. Eighty children died of the disorder and nine adults either died or needed lung transplants. In the two years following the banning of cleaning chemicals for humidifier tanks, there were no new cases.

== See also ==
- Air ionizer
- The Bronchitis kettle, an early humidifier
- Dehumidifier
- Evaporative cooler
- Hygrometer, for measuring humidity
- Ultrasonic nozzle
