= Sketch (TV series) =

2018 South Korean television series

- Promotional poster
- Hangul: 스케치
- RR: Seukechi
- MR: Sŭk'ech'i
- Genre: Action; Fantasy; Crime
- Written by: Kang Hyun-sung
- Directed by: Lim Tae-woo
- Starring: Rain; Lee Sun-bin; Lee Dong-gun; Jung Jin-young; Kang Shin-il; Lim Hwa-young; Lee Seung-joo
- Composer: Ji Pyung-kwon
- Country of origin: South Korea
- Original language: Korean
- No. of episodes: 16

Production
- Executive producers: Bae Ik-hyun; Lee Hyang-bong; Park Joon-seo
- Camera setup: Single camera
- Running time: 60 mins
- Production companies: Drama House; Neo Entertainment

Original release
- Network: JTBC
- Release: May 25 – July 14, 2018

Sketch (Korean: 스케치) is a South Korean television series starring Rain, Lee Sun-bin, Lee Dong-gun, Jung Jin-young, Kang Shin-il, Lim Hwa-young and Lee Seung-joo. It aired on JTBC from May 25, 2018, to July 14, 2018.

== Synopsis ==
The plot revolves around an ace detective, Kang Dong-soo (Jung Ji-hoon), and a female detective, Yoo Shi-hyun (Lee Sun-bin), who can sketch out the future as they try to capture a serial killer.

== Cast ==
=== Main ===
- Rain as Kang Dong-soo

An ace detective armed with excellent intuition and executive ability.

- Lee Dong-gun as Kim Do-jin

A member of the Republic of Korea Army Special Warfare Command who seeks revenge for the death of his wife.

- Lee Sun-bin as Yoo Shi-hyun

A detective who has the psychic ability to sketch out drawings of what will happen three days in the future.

- Jung Jin-young as Jang Tae-joon

A mysterious man. Chief of Internal Affairs.

- Kang Shin-il as Moon Jae-hyun

Team leader of the Butterfly Project.

- Lim Hwa-young as Oh Young-shim

A technical assistant of the Butterfly Project that provides crucial information to the team.

Song Ji-woo as young Oh Young-shim

- Lee Seung-joo as Yoo Si-joon

Prosecutor and elder brother of Yoo Shi-hyun.

=== Recurring ===
- Yoo Da-in as Min Ji-soo

Kang Dong-soo's fiancé

- Lee Joong-ok as Seo Sang-goo
- Shim Wan-joon as Lee
- Kim Hyung-mook as Nam Sun-woo
- Park Sung-geun as Doctor Oh
- Kim Yong-hee as Jung Il-woo
- Lee Kyu-sung as An Kyung-tae
- Park Doo-shik as Jung Il-soo
- Joo Min-kyung as Lee Soo-young
- Son Jong-hak as Park Mi-moon
- Lee Hae-young as Baek Woo-jin
- Jung So-young as Kim Sun-mi
- Lee Ki-hyuk as Lee Jin-yeong's husband
- Kim Hee-jung as Shi-hyun's mother

=== Special appearance ===
- Yoon Bok-in as Oh Yeong-sim's mother

== Production ==
Hwang Jung-eum was offered the lead role but declined.

This drama reunites Rain and Lee Dong-gun who have worked together 15 years ago in the drama Sang Doo! Let's Go to School.

The first script reading took place in March, 2018 at the JTBC building in Sangam, Seoul.

== Original soundtrack ==
Sketch OST

Soundtrack album by Various Artists
- Released: 2018
- Genre: Soundtrack
- Languages: Korean; English
- Label: Warner Music Korea

=== Part 1 ===
Released on June 8, 2018
No.	Title	Lyrics	Music	Artist	Length
1.	"On This Strange Road" (이 낯선 길에서)	Lim Tae-woo; Namu	Ji Pyung-kwon	DZO	3:26
2.	"On This Strange Road" (Inst.)		Ji Pyung-kwon		3:26
Total length:					6:52

=== Part 2 ===
Released on June 15, 2018
No.	Title	Lyrics	Music	Artist	Length
1.	"Faded" (옅은)	SunBee	Ji Pyung-kwon; Yeom Seung-jae	SunBee	2:47
2.	"Faded" (Inst.)		Ji Pyung-kwon; Yeom Seung-jae		2:47
Total length:					5:34

=== Part 3 ===
Released on June 22, 2018
No.	Title	Lyrics	Music	Artist	Length
1.	"Sailing"	Damon	Ji Pyung-kwon	Damon	3:51
2.	"Sailing" (Inst.)		Ji Pyung-kwon		3:51
Total length:					7:42

=== Part 4 ===
Released on June 30, 2018
No.	Title	Lyrics	Music	Artist	Length
1.	"Becoming A Butterfly" (나비가 되어)	Ji Pyung-kwon; Lee Jong-won	Ji Pyung-kwon	Kimmaster	3:39
2.	"Becoming A Butterfly" (Inst.)		Ji Pyung-kwon		3:39
Total length:					7:18

=== Part 5 ===
Released on July 6, 2018
No.	Title	Lyrics	Music	Artist	Length
1.	"Sunset"	All Against	Ji Pyung-kwon	All Against	5:05
2.	"Sunset" (Inst.)		Ji Pyung-kwon		5:05
Total length:					10:10

== Viewership ==
Sketch : South Korea viewers per episode (thousands)

Season	Episode number																Average
Season	1	2	3	4	5	6	7	8	9	10	11	12	13	14	15	16	Average
1	654	753	694	753	622	685	538	548	674	502	519	505	490	528	552	566	599

Source: Audience measurement performed nationwide by Nielsen Media Research.

Average TV viewership ratings
Ep.	Original broadcast date	Average audience share		
Ep.	Original broadcast date	AGB Nielsen		TNmS
Ep.	Original broadcast date	Nationwide	Seoul	Nationwide
1	May 25, 2018	3.254%	3.977%	3.4%
2	May 26, 2018	3.682%	4.518%	3.3%
3	June 1, 2018	2.982%	3.455%	3.0%
4	June 2, 2018	3.196%	3.826%	3.3%
5	June 8, 2018	3.222%	4.135%	2.9%
6	June 9, 2018	3.405%	3.696%	3.0%
7	June 15, 2018	2.459%	2.902%	2.6%
8	June 16, 2018	2.448%	3.639%	2.6%
9	June 22, 2018	2.835%	3.275%	3.0%
10	June 23, 2018	2.559%	2.878%	2.7%
11	June 29, 2018	2.535%	3.232%	2.6%
12	June 30, 2018	2.590%	2.943%	2.8%
13	July 6, 2018	2.234%	2.832%	2.4%
14	July 7, 2018	2.487%	2.850%	2.6%
15	July 13, 2018	2.620%	3.086%	—N/a
16	July 14, 2018	2.324%	2.416%	—N/a
Average		2.802%	3.354%	— (Note: Due to some ratings not recorded, the exact average rating is unknown.)
In the table above, the blue numbers represent the lowest ratings and the red numbers represent the highest ratings.; N/A denotes that the rating is not known.; This drama aired on a cable channel/pay TV which normally has a relatively smaller audience compared to free-to-air TV/public broadcasters (KBS, SBS, MBC and EBS).

== Awards and nominations ==
Year	Award	Category	Nominee	Result	Ref.
2018	6th APAN Star Awards	Best New Actress	Lee Sun-bin	Nominated	
