= Team Bulldog: Off-Duty Investigation =

2020 South Korean television series

- Promotional poster
- Hangul: 번외수사
- Hanja: 番外搜査
- Lit.: Further Investigation
- RR: Beonoesusa
- MR: Pŏnoesusa
- Genre: Action; Crime
- Created by: OCN; Team Gorilla (Note: Team Gorilla (팀 고릴라) is a contents planning and creation company founded by Ma Dong-seok.)
- Written by: Lee Yu-jin; Jung Yoon-sun
- Directed by: Kang Hyo-jin
- Starring: Cha Tae-hyun; Lee Sun-bin; Jung Sang-hoon; Yoon Kyung-ho; Ji Seung-hyun
- Country of origin: South Korea
- Original language: Korean
- No. of episodes: 12

Production
- Producer: Han Seok-won
- Running time: 60 minutes
- Production company: Zium Content (JTBC Studios)

Original release
- Network: OCN
- Release: May 23 – June 28, 2020

Team Bulldog: Off-Duty Investigation (Korean: 번외수사) is a 2020 South Korean television series starring Cha Tae-hyun, Lee Sun-bin, Jung Sang-hoon, Yoon Kyung-ho and Ji Seung-hyun. It is the third series of OCN's "Dramatic Cinema" project which combines film and drama formats. It aired from May 23 to June 28, 2020.

== Synopsis ==
Known as an enthusiastic and impressively effective detective, Jin Kang-ho (Cha Tae-hyun) will stop at nothing to catch criminals he's assigned to pursue. With the passion to solve the unsolvable cases, Kang-ho finds it's better to work alone. Or so it was, until the day he meet Kang Moo-young (Lee Sun-bin), the overly zealous producer of a low-rated investigative program. Moo-young is as enthusiastic about solving cases and catching criminals as Kang-ho. The two then agree to team up and work together.

== Cast ==
=== Main ===
- Cha Tae-hyun as Jin Kang-ho
- Lee Sun-bin as Kang Moo-young
- Jung Sang-hoon as Lee Pan-seok
- Yoon Kyung-ho as Teddy Jung
- Ji Seung-hyun as Tak-won

=== Supporting ===
- Park Jung-woo as Min Dae-jin
- Park Tae-san as Manson
- Jang Jin-hee as Senior
- Lim Chul-hyung as Seo In-jae
- Kim Kyung-sik as Shin Ki-chul
- Kim Young-sung as Detective Jo
- Yoo Young-chae as Detective Maeng
- Son Kwang-eop as Myung Ki-chul
- Song Yoo-hyun as PD Hong
- Park Sung-joon as Kang Moo-taek
- Jung Chan-bi as Lee Ga-eun
- Seo Hye-won as Cho So-yoo
- Cha Woo-jin as Park Hyun-goo
- Kwak Ji-yoo as Main writer
- Han Yeo-wool as Sub writer
- Kim Hong-kyung as Youngest writer
- Na Kyung-min as Fact Check host
- Sung Byung-sook as Kang-ho's mother

=== Special appearances ===
- Ma Dong-seok as Jin Woo-taek (ep. 1)
- Kim Kwang-kyu as Gang boss (ep. 1)
- Park Chan-woo as Jo Sang-baek (ep. 1)
- Noh Su-min as Goo Hyung-jin (ep. 1–2)
- Han Ki-woong as Kim Min-seok (ep. 2)
- Han Ki-won as Kim Min-soo (ep.2)
- Lee Young-suk as Ji Soo-chul (ep. 2)
- Min Kyung-ok as Noh Soon-yi (ep. 2, 9)
- Ji Chan as Jang Min-ki (ep. 2–5)
- Son Byung-wook as Kang Soo (ep. 2–5)
- Kwon Hyuk-bum as Lee Tae-sung (ep. 3, 5)
- Seo Jin-won as Han Seok-ho (ep. 3, 5)
- Jo Seung-yeon as Yoo Sung-gook (ep. 3–5)
- Kim Ye-jin as Kim Jin-kyung (ep. 3–5)
- Sul Ji-yoon as Choi Mi-na (ep. 4–5)
- Lee Ha-nee as Jang Sung-soo (ep. 4–5)
- Moon Ha-yeon as Kwak Hyun-sook (ep. 5, 7–8)
- Noh Young-hak as Park Jae-min (ep. 6, 8–9)
- Jung Hyun-joong as Park Jae-min (teen) (ep. 6–7)
- Uhm Tae-hyun as Jo Jin-soo (ep. 6–7)
- Kim Tae-won as Min Dae-jin (teen) (ep. 6)
- Lee Seung-yeol as Kwon Ki-woong (teen) (ep. 6–8)
- Lee Poong-woon as Kwon Ki-woong (ep. 7–8)
- Kim Jin-seong as Jo Myung-soo (ep. 7–8)
- Do Yeon-jin as Son Ji-young (ep. 9–10)
- Kim Young-moo as Shin Ki-jung (ep. 9–10)
- Jang Kyug-su as Ham Deok-soo (ep. 9–10)
- Kim Bum-suk as Pi Cheon-woo (ep. 9)
- Ok Joo-ri as Ji-young's landlord (ep. 9)
- Jang Myoung-un as Police officer (ep. 9)
- Baek Seung-chul as Doh Ki-tae (ep. 9–11)
- Cha Gun-woo as Ji-young's father (ep. 10)
- Kim Young as NFS video engineer (ep. 10–11)
- Lee Su-hyung as NFS staff (ep. 11)
- Ri Min as Ji Soo-chul (young) (ep. 12)

== Viewership ==
Team Bulldog: Off-Duty Investigation : South Korea viewers per episode (thousands)

Season	Episode number												Average
Season	1	2	3	4	5	6	7	8	9	10	11	12	Average
1	571	618	535	607	627	663	875	878	725	646	739	1135	718

Source: Audience measurement performed nationwide by Nielsen Korea.

Average TV viewership ratings
Ep.	Original broadcast date	Average audience share	
Ep.	Original broadcast date	Nielsen Korea	
Ep.	Original broadcast date	Nationwide	Seoul
1	May 23, 2020	1.947%	2.198%
2	May 24, 2020	2.485%	2.832%
3	May 30, 2020	2.151%	2.932%
4	May 31, 2020	2.458%	3.095%
5	June 6, 2020	2.323%	2.944%
6	June 7, 2020	2.674%	2.811%
7	June 13, 2020	3.786%	4.670%
8	June 14, 2020	3.318%	3.851%
9	June 20, 2020	2.799%	3.374%
10	June 21, 2020	2.843%	3.163%
11	June 27, 2020	2.908%	3.219%
12	June 28, 2020	4.389%	5.064%
Average		2.840%	3.345%
In the table above, the blue numbers represent the lowest ratings and the red numbers represent the highest ratings.; This drama aired on a cable channel/pay TV which normally has a relatively smaller audience compared to free-to-air TV/public broadcasters (KBS, SBS, MBC and EBS).
