= Noise (2024 film) =

2024 film by Kim Soo-jin

- Theatrical release poster
- Hangul: 노이즈
- RR: Noijeu
- MR: Noijŭ
- Directed by: Kim Soo-jin
- Written by: Lee Je-hui; Kim Yong-hwan
- Produced by: Ko Seung-hyo
- Starring: Lee Sun-bin; Kim Min-seok; Han Su-a; Ryu Kyung-soo; Jeon Ik-ryung; Baek Joo-hee
- Cinematography: Jun Hong-kyu
- Edited by: Kim Ha-na; Kim Woo-hyun
- Music by: Heo Jun-hyeok
- Production company: Studio Finecut
- Distributed by: By4M Studio
- Release dates: September 7, 2024 (TIFF); June 25, 2025 (South Korea)
- Running time: 93 minutes
- Country: South Korea
- Language: Korean
- Budget: US$2.5 million
- Box office: US$12.6 million

Noise (Korean: 노이즈) is a 2024 South Korean horror thriller film directed by Kim Soo-jin in his feature film directional debut and starring Lee Sun-bin, Kim Min-seok, Han Su-a, Ryu Kyung-soo, Jeon Ik-ryung, and Baek Joo-hee. The film follows two sisters who move into a new apartment, hoping to start fresh. But their seemingly normal life takes a horrifying twist when one of them suddenly disappears without a trace, leaving behind a deep mystery.

The film premiered at the 2024 Toronto International Film Festival on September 7, 2024. It was released theatrically on June 25, 2025 in South Korea.

== Plot ==
Joo-hee lives in apartment 604 and has become disturbed by strange noises coming from upstairs. She installs soundproofing material on her ceiling and records the noise levels with a sound meter. After seeing the high decibel reading, she angrily declares that she will gather evidence. When the doorbell rings, she receives only the eerie laughter of a woman through the intercom. As the noises from upstairs continue, Joo-hee takes her camcorder and leaves the apartment.

Four days later, Joo-hee's older sister Joo-young learns from detective Kim Hong-gyu that her sister has gone missing. Returning to their apartment, Joo-young finds a threatening note apparently left by Geun-bae, the resident of apartment 504. Inside, she discovers that Joo-hee had covered the living room with soundproofing materials. She also finds a strange mold-like substance in Joo-hee's room. Geun-bae arrives and complains about the noise, claiming that he can no longer tolerate it. Joo-young later tells the detective that she suspects him of abducting Joo-hee, but he says there is insufficient evidence.

Joo-young discovers a recording that Joo-hee had prepared as a birthday gift for her, along with a hearing aid. She unlocks Joo-hee's phone and identifies the number from her sister's final call. At Joo-hee's workplace, she meets Ki-hoon, who had been close to her sister. Meanwhile, Geun-bae continues to harass Joo-young and eventually becomes convinced that the noises are coming from apartment 704 rather than 604. When he goes upstairs to investigate, the ghost of the woman who lived in 704 appears and pursues him. While fleeing, Geun-bae falls from the seventh floor and dies.

After Geun-bae's death, Joo-young discovers that the threatening note outside her apartment has mysteriously become blank. When she removes it, she finds her own name, "Seo Joo-young," scratched into the paper. Joo-young and Ki-hoon investigate the building's history and learn that a former resident of 604 was allegedly responsible for killing the former head of the residents' association who lived in 704. They enter an unused basement storage area, where they become separated. Ki-hoon finds the corpse of the former 604 resident and, after hearing a horrific sound, begins behaving strangely. Meanwhile, Joo-young discovers a sketchbook depicting the car accident that killed their parents. The drawings reveal that Joo-young had distracted their father while he was driving, causing the accident. She later encounters the disturbed Ki-hoon, who attacks her, but she manages to escape.

Joo-young is eventually found by the head of the residents' association, who tells her that the police were called after she claimed someone was in the basement. She learns that the daughter of the resident of 804 had died years earlier after being struck by a delivery truck. The head's son, Yeon-woo, communicates with Joo-young through sign language and tells her that she has heard something she was not supposed to hear. Joo-young then discovers that Ki-hoon has died and returns to the basement. There, she finds Joo-hee's camcorder and watches its final recording. The footage shows Joo-hee entering apartment 804 after realizing that the noises were coming from there. She discovers speakers connecting the ceiling and floor and witnesses the woman from 804 speaking as though to her deceased daughter. The woman admits to killing the former head of the residents' association in 704 before attacking Joo-hee and ending the recording.

Joo-young eventually finds Joo-hee in the basement, but the woman from 804 appears and pursues them. Joo-young hides her sister and attempts to lure the woman away. During their confrontation, the woman claims that she never intended to kill the residents of 704 or Joo-hee, but that they had insulted her daughter. Just as she is about to kill Joo-young, the ghost of the woman from 704 appears and attacks her. The woman begs Joo-young for help, but Joo-young shuts the door and escapes. She then finds Joo-hee and embraces her, telling her not to listen to the sounds around them.

Some time later, a new resident moves into apartment 704 and visits Joo-young. When asked whether she lives alone, Joo-young says that she lives with her younger sister. Joo-hee appears behind her, still wearing the same clothes and appearing as she did when she disappeared, but the new resident cannot see her. It is revealed that Joo-hee had actually died during her encounter with the woman from 804 and that Joo-young, unable to accept her sister's death, has been hallucinating her presence.

== Cast ==
- Lee Sun-bin as Seo Joo-young, Joo-hee's older sister
- Kim Min-seok as Yoon Ki-hoon
- Han Su-a as Seo Joo-hee, resident of apartment 604
- Ryu Kyung-soo as Park Geun-bae, resident of apartment 504
- Jeon Ik-ryung as Jeong-in, resident of apartment 804
- Baek Joo-hee as Head of the residents' association

== Production ==
Filming took place from October 2023 to February 2024.

== Release ==
Noise had its premiere at the 2024 Toronto International Film Festival on September 7, 2024 in the Industry Selects section. It was later screened at the 57th Sitges Film Festival in Panorama section on October 11, 2024. On March 24, 2025 it was showcased at the 23rd Florence Korea Film Fest in Florence, Italy.

It was released in South Korean theaters on June 25, 2025.

The film was also selected for competing in the 'New Flesh Competition' for the best first feature award at the 29th Fantasia International Film Festival, where it was screened on July 17, 2025 for its North American Premiere.

On October 24, it was screened at the Hong Kong Asian Film Festival in Cineaste Delights section.

In January 2024, Finecut acquired the international sales rights of the film.

The film has been released sequentially in the Asian countries in 2025, Indonesia on June 27, the Philippines on July 2, Mongolia on July 4. It will be released in Thailand on July 17, Vietnam on July 18, and Cambodia on August 11.

It competed in the "International Fantastic Film Competition" section of the Strasbourg European Fantastic Film Festival on October 1, 2025.

== Reception ==
Noise received generally positive reviews, with critics highlighting its effective blend of horror and social commentary, despite some shortcomings in the screenplay. As of July 28, 2025, it is placed at the fifth place among the Korean films released in 2025.

Panos Kotzathanasis in Asian Movie Pulse criticized the screenplay, as in his opinion the, "writing dips slightly in quality", but praised the performance of Lee Sun-bin, writing "Lee Sun-bin is compelling as Joo-young," and for Ryu Kyung-soo, Kotzathanasis wrote that "he stands out as the threatening neighbor, his eerie presence leaving a lasting impression." Overall Kotzathanasis found the film "as an engaging horror feature that offers enough social commentary to appeal to a broader audience beyond genre enthusiasts."

=== Box office ===
The film was released on June 25, 2025 on 944 screens. It opened at first place at the South Korean box office with 28,167 admissions. It surpassed 500,000 viewers on the 11th day of its release. During its second weekend of release, the film recorded an audience of 326,270 viewers, a significant increase from the 147,849 viewers registered during its opening weekend at the Korean box office. On July 12, the film surpassed 1 million viewers by accumulating 1,006,430 cumulative viewers on 18th day of its release and achieved its break even point. On 27th day of its release, on July 21, it surpassed 1.5 million cumulative viewers.

As of August 25, 2025, the film has grossed US$12,072,032 from 1,707,574 admissions.

=== Accolades ===
| Award ceremony | Year | Category | Recipient(s) | Result | Ref. |
|---|---|---|---|---|---|
| Baeksang Arts Awards | 2026 | Best New Director | Kim Soo-jin | Nominated | |
| Blue Dragon Film Awards | 2025 | Best New Actress | Lee Sun-bin | Nominated | |
| Blue Dragon Film Awards | 2025 | Best New Director | Kim Soo-jin | Nominated | |
| Blue Dragon Film Awards | 2025 | Technical Award | Park Yong-ki (Sound) | Nominated | |
| Director's Cut Awards | 2026 | Best New Director (Film) | Kim Soo-jin | Nominated | |
| Fantasia International Film Festival | 2025 | New Flesh Competition for Best First Feature | Ko Seung-hyo | Nominated | |
| Strasbourg European Fantastic Film Festival | 2025 | Golden Octopus | Noise | Nominated | |
