= Lee Sun-bin =

South Korean actress (born 1994)

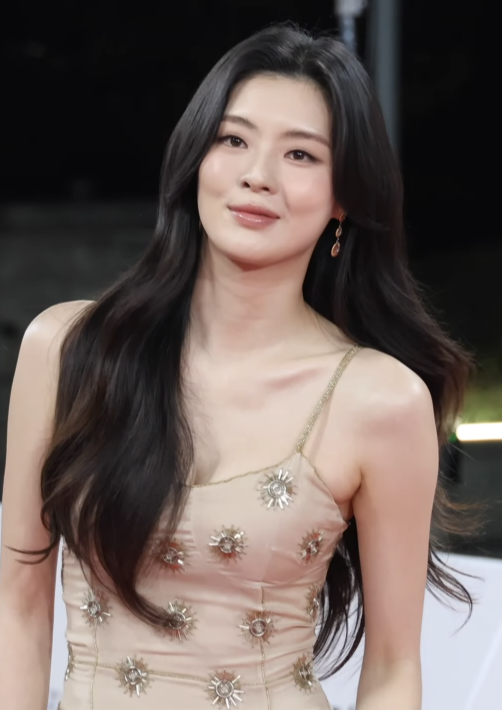
- Lee in November 2025
- Born: Lee Jin-kyung; January 7, 1994 (age 32); Cheonan, South Korea
- Occupations: Actress; singer
- Years active: 2011–present
- Agent(s): Nexus E&M
- Musical career
- Genre: K-pop
- Instrument: Vocals
- Years active: 2011–2012
- Label: GP
- Formerly of: JQT

Korean name
- Hangul: 이진경
- RR: I Jingyeong
- MR: I Chin'gyŏng

Stage name
- Hangul: 이선빈
- RR: I Seonbin
- MR: I Sŏnbin

Lee Jin-kyung (Korean: 이진경; born January 7, 1994), known professionally as Lee Sun-bin (이선빈), is a South Korean actress and singer. She is a former member of the South Korean girl group JQT, and is known for starring in Squad 38 (2016), Work Later, Drink Now (2021–2023), and Boyhood (2023).

== Career ==
=== 2011–2015: Beginnings, modeling and overseas activities ===
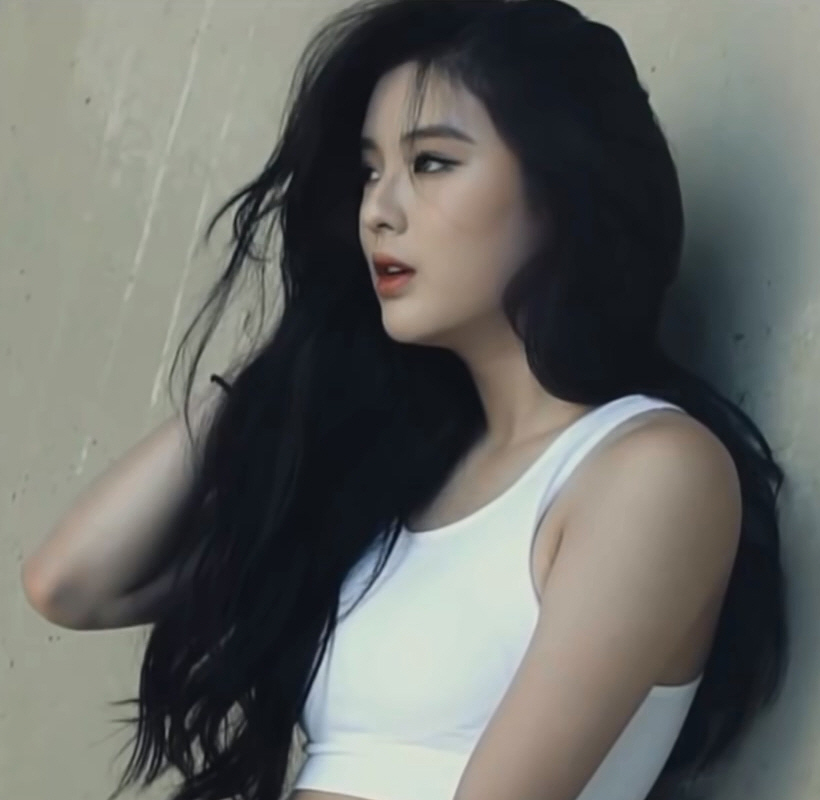
Lee in 2015

In October 2011, GP Entertainment revealed that Lee would be joining their new girl group JQT, under her birth name Jin-kyung, upon departure of one of the members, Minsun. Lee participated in JQT's activities as a vocalist until their disbandment in February 2012. She took on a modelling gig alongside Teen Top for uniforms in November 2012, and was said to be debuting again in another girl group in December 2012, but plans did not follow through. She then left GP Entertainment and joined Wellmade Yedang as an acting trainee. Before officially beginning her acting career, Lee was a CF model and made several music video appearances.

In 2014, Lee received her first acting role in the Chinese historical drama Saint Wang Xizhi. Lee also participated as a contestant in CCTV's singing show Finding Liu San Jie, and the New Year Gala.

=== 2016–present: Rising popularity ===
In January 2016, Lee took on a supporting role in the JTBC drama Madame Antoine: The Love Therapist, followed by several cameo appearances in dramas and films. Her breakthrough role came in June 2016, where she portrayed a gold digger in OCN's hit drama Squad 38 alongside Seo In-guk and Ma Dong-seok. She went on to participate in several variety shows where she received praise for her singing and dancing.

In January 2017, Lee co-starred in MBC's disaster drama Missing 9. In July, she starred in tvN's remake of the American blockbuster television series Criminal Minds, where she played the Korean version of JJ's character. In September, she began filming for Kim Sung-hoon's action zombie film Rampant alongside Jang Dong-gun and Hyun Bin.

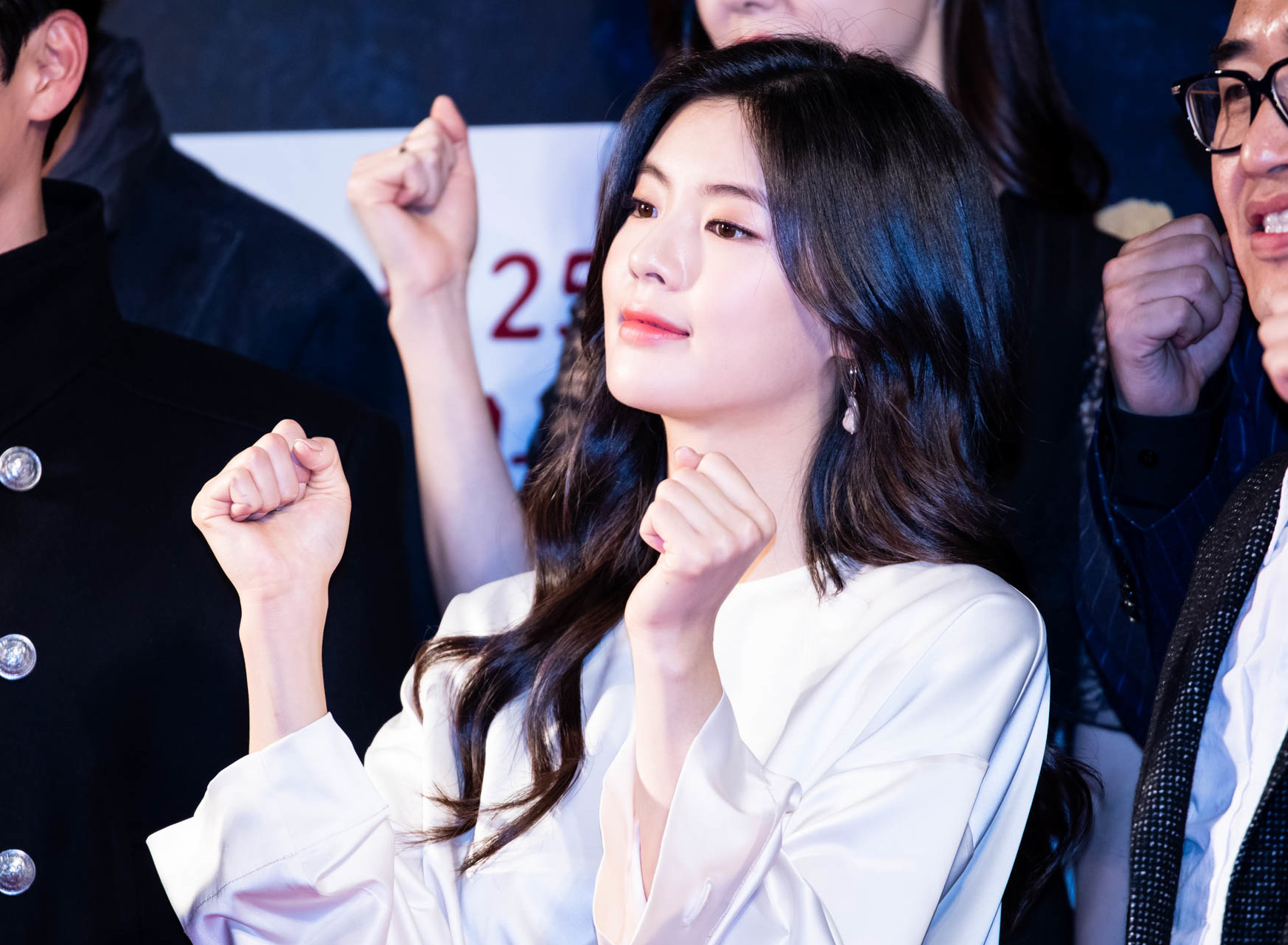
Lee in 2018

In 2018, Lee was cast in her first leading role in JTBC's action drama Sketch. The same year she was cast in tvN's drama special The Dramatization Has Already Begun. In 2019, Lee was cast in action comedy film Okay! Madam and political drama The Great Show. In 2020, Lee was cast in the crime detective drama Team Bulldog: Off-Duty Investigation. In 2021, she starred in action spy film Mission: Possible opposite Kim Young-kwang. In August 2021, Lee signed with Initial Entertainment, after the contract with the original agency expired. In 2022, Lee made a comeback with the film Air Murder.

In July 2026, Nexus E&M officially announced that Lee had signed an exclusive contract with the agency.

== Personal life ==
On December 31, 2018, it was reported that Lee had been dating actor Lee Kwang-soo, with King Kong by Starship stating that the couple had been dating "for 5 months" prior to the announcement of their relationship.

== Discography ==
=== Collaborations ===
Title	Year	Album
"One Love" (with RGP)	2017	Non-album single

=== Soundtrack appearances ===
List of soundtrack appearances, showing year released and album name
Title	Year	Album
"Sad Night" (아픈 밤)	2019	The Great Show OST Part 2
"Savage Killer"	2020	Team Bulldog: Off-Duty Investigation OST Part 5
"Dreamer" (드리머)	2021	Work Later, Drink Now OST Part 3
"Together" (달까지 가자) (with Jo Aram and Ra Mi-ran)	2025	To the Moon OST Part 5

== Filmography ==
=== Film ===
Key
†	Denotes films that have not yet been released

Year	Title	Role	Notes	Ref.
2016	Familyhood	Ji-hoon's lover	Bit part	
2018	The Princess and the Matchmaker	Princess 1		
2018	Rampant	Deok-hee		
2020	Me and Me	Cho-hee		
2020	Okay! Madam	Ahn Se-ra / young Gwi-sun		
2021	Mission: Possible	Yi Ling / Yoo Da-hee		
2022	Air Murder	Han Young-joo		
2022	Reverse	Ham Myo-jin	Sound film	
2024	Noise	Joo-yeong		
2026	Ugly Duckling Ms. Maeng	Maeng Bo-ram		
2027	The Sword: Rebirth of the Red Wolf †	Maya		
TBA	The Sound of Life †	Goo Hae-jin		

=== Television series ===
Year	Title	Role	Notes	Ref.
2015	Saint Wang Xizhi	Jinzi	Chinese drama	
2016	Madame Antoine: The Love Therapist	Lee Ma-ri		
2016	Entertainer		Cameo (episode 4)	
2016	Another Miss Oh	Jin-sang's Monday girlfriend	Cameo	
2016	Squad 38	Jo Mi-joo		
2016	Entourage	Herself	Cameo (episode 13)	
2017	Missing 9	Ha Ji-ah		
2017	Criminal Minds	Yoo Min-young		
2018	Sketch	Yoo Shi-hyun		
2018	The Dramatization Has Already Begun	Hong Hee-soo		
2019	The Great Show	Jung Soo-hyun		
2020	Team Bulldog: Off-Duty Investigation	Kang Moo-young		
2020	The Uncanny Counter	Heo Hee-young	Cameo (episode 1 and 3)	
2021–2023	Work Later, Drink Now	Ahn So-hee	Season 1–2	
2021	Jirisan	Kang Seung-ah	Cameo (episode 15–16)	
2023	The Heavenly Idol	Acting trainer	Cameo (episode 5)	
2023	Boyhood	Park Ji-young		
2025	The Potato Lab	Kim Mi-kyung		
2025	Let's Go to the Moon	Jeong Da-hae		

=== Television shows ===
Year	Title	Role	Notes	Ref.
2016	Law of the Jungle in Mongolia	Cast member	Episode 229–233	
2016	I Can See Your Voice	Contestant		
2021	Wild Idol	Panelist		
2022	Women in Mountain Mountaineers	Cast member	with Jung Eun-ji and Han Sun-hwa	

=== Web shows ===
Year	Title	Role	Notes	Ref.
2022	Saturday Night Live Korea	Host	Season 2 – Episode 3	
2022	Pink Lie	Host		

=== Music video appearances ===
Year	Song title	Artist	Ref.
2013	"Goodbye 20"	Lim Kim	
2014	"Almost" (하마터면)	Amy	
2014	"Nabiya" (나비야)	Wu-Tan	
2014	"Three Things I Want To Give You" (너에게 주고 싶은 세가지)	Crucial Star	
2015	"Apology" (지못미)	iKon	
2016	"I Don't Want" (바라지 않아)	Jung Key	
2016	"Visual Gangster" (널 너무 사랑해서)	MC Mong	
2018	"Cho Shim" (초심)	Kiha & The Faces	
2021	"Don't Say Sorry"	Shin Yong-jae and Kim Won-ju	

== Ambassadorships ==
- 2021 Gyeonggi World Ceramic Biennale (2021)
- Cheonan Public Relations Ambassador (2022)

== Accolades ==
=== Awards and nominations ===
Name of the award ceremony, year presented, category, nominee of the award, and the result of the nomination
Award ceremony	Year	Category	Nominee / Work	Result	Ref.
APAN Star Awards	2018	Best New Actress	Sketch	Nominated	
Asia Model Awards	2023	Popular Star Award (Actor)	Work Later, Drink Now	Won	
Blue Dragon Film Awards	2025	Best New Actress	Noise	Nominated	
MBC Drama Awards	2017	Best New Actress	Missing 9	Won	
MBC Drama Awards	2025	Excellence Award, Actress in a Miniseries	To the Moon	Won	
MBC Drama Awards	2025	Best Couple Award	Lee Sun-bin (with Kim Young-dae); To the Moon	Nominated	
MBC Entertainment Awards	2016	Rookie Award in Music/Talk Show (Female)	Radio Star	Nominated	

=== Honors ===
Name of country and organization, year given, and name of honor or award
Country	Organization	Year	Honor or Award	Ref.
South Korea	Newsis K-Expo Cultural Awards (Note: Established in 2019 and co-sponsored by Korea's Ministry of Culture, Sports and Tourism, Ministry of Foreign Affairs, Korea Creative Content Agency, Seoul Metropolitan Council and the Seoul Tourism Organization, it awards cultural icons, businesses, and individuals who have contributed greatly to Hallyu, the Korean wave.)	2022	Seoul Mayor's Award	
