= Manhole (TV series) =

2017 South Korean television series

- Promotional poster
- Also known as: Man-Hole
- Hangul: 맨홀: 이상한 나라의 필
- RR: Maenhol: isanghan naraui Pil
- MR: Maenhol: isanghan naraŭi P'il
- Genre: Comedy; Romance
- Created by: KBS Drama Production
- Written by: Lee Jae-gon
- Directed by: Park Man-young; Yoo Young-eun
- Starring: Kim Jae-joong; Uee; Cha Sun-woo; Jung Hye-sung
- Country of origin: South Korea
- Original language: Korean
- No. of episodes: 16

Production
- Executive producers: Kang Byung-taek; Park Jae-sam
- Producer: Choi Jun-ho
- Cinematography: Kim Pil-seung; Wi Chang-suk
- Editors: Kim Chung-ryul; Song Jin-suk
- Camera setup: Single-camera
- Running time: 60 mins
- Production company: Celltrion Entertainment

Original release
- Network: KBS2
- Release: August 9 – September 28, 2017

Manhole (Korean: 맨홀: 이상한 나라의 필; RR: Maenhol: isanghan naraui Pil; lit. 'Manhole: Wonderland's Pil') is a South Korean television series starring Kim Jae-joong, Uee, Cha Sun-woo, Jung Hye-sung. It aired on KBS2, from August 9 to September 28, 2017 on Wednesdays and Thursdays at 22:00 (KST) for 16 episodes.

The drama drew a nationwide rating of 1.4% for its eighth episode. At the time, this was the lowest ever recorded for a drama airing in a regular time slot on broadcast television. Lovely Horribly recorded an even lower single-episode rating of 1.0% in 2018, but Manhole remained the primetime drama with the lowest average rating (2.1%), until Welcome, which aired on the same network and timeslot, broke the record in 2020.

== Synopsis ==
Foreseeing his own fate, he travels from past to present. The main purpose of him traveling through time is to stop his ideal girl's wedding.

== Cast ==
=== Main ===
- Kim Jae-joong as Bong Pil
- Uee as Kang Soo-jin
- Jung Hye-sung as Yoon Jin-sook
- Cha Sun-woo as Jo Suk-tae

=== Supporting ===
==== Neighborhood families ====
- Lee Sang-yi as Oh Dal-soo
- Kang Hong-seok as Yang Koo-gil
- Kim Min-ji as Hong Jung-ae

==== Main characters' parents ====
- Joo Jin-mo as Bong Dal
- Kim Hye-ok as Yoon Kkeut-soon
- Woo Hyun as Suk-tae's father
- Seo Hyun-chul as Soo-jin's father
- Lee Yun-kyung as Soo-jin's mother

==== Strangers in the neighborhood ====
- Jang Mi-kwan as Park Jae-hyun

==== Bonbon Hope ====
- Seo Young as Mi-ja
- Son Ji-an as Yoon-mi

==== Extended ====
- Park Ah-in as Park Young-joo
- Jo Seo-hoo as Yoon-mi
- Kim Young-ok (voice only)
- Jung In-gi
- Kim Dae-gon as Jang-hye
- Kim Joong-kil
- Choi Yoon-bin
- Park Hee-kon
- Seon Woo-sung
- Heo Soo-jung
- Son Kyung-won
- Lee Seung-hoon
- Go Man-kyoo
- Ha Jin
- Ri Min
- Lee Jae-eun
- Kim Ji-sun
- Ahn Hee-joo
- Yoo Geum
- Park Sang-yong
- Jo Hee
- Oh Yong
- Kim Kwon as Man attending church
- Kim Kyu-chul as Yang Koo-gil's father
- Song Ha-rim
- Park Chan-hong
- Sung Hyun-joon
- Park Shi-yun
- Heo Soo-jung
- Park Do-joon
- Han Jae-woong
- Kim Bong-soo
- Lee Seung-hyun
- Kim Hae-kon
- Choi Yoon-joon
- Song Kyung-hwa
- Tae Won-suk
- Park Hee-kon
- Lee Dong-hee
- Choi Kyo-shik

== Soundtrack ==
Manhole OST

Soundtrack album by Various artists
- Genre: Soundtrack
- Language: Korean
- Labels: Leon Korea, Music&NEW

=== Part 1 ===
No.	Title	Artists	Length
1.	"Airplane" (비행기)	Louie; Hayana	03:38
2.	"Airplane" (비행기) (Inst.)		03:38
Total length:			07:16

=== Part 2 ===
No.	Title	Artists	Length
1.	"To You" (너의 앞으로)	Sooyoon	02:50
2.	"To You" (너의 앞으로) (Inst.)		02:50
Total length:			05:40

=== Part 3 ===
No.	Title	Artists	Length
1.	"Tell Me" (말해줘)	Sandeul (B1A4)	03:14
2.	"Tell Me" (말해줘) (Inst.)		03:14
Total length:			06:28

=== Part 4 ===
No.	Title	Artists	Length
1.	"It's a Secret" (쉿! 비밀인데)	Norwegian Wood	03:26
2.	"It's a Secret" (쉿! 비밀인데) (Inst.)		03:26
Total length:			06:52

=== Part 5 ===
No.	Title	Artists	Length
1.	"Run a Way"	U-KISS	03:39
2.	"Run a Way" (Inst.)		03:39
Total length:			07:18

=== Part 6 ===
No.	Title	Artists	Length
1.	"For You" (너에게)	Kim E-Z (Ggotjam Project)	03:33
2.	"For You" (너에게) (Inst.)		03:33
Total length:			07:06

=== Part 7 ===
No.	Title	Artists	Length
1.	"Stay With Me"	Kim Ji-soo	03:24
2.	"Stay With Me" (Inst.)		03:24
Total length:			06:48

=== Part 8 ===
No.	Title	Artists	Length
1.	"Love Come" (사랑이 찾아와)	Maktub	03:27
2.	"Love Come" (사랑이 찾아와) (Inst.)		03:27
Total length:			06:54

=== Part 9 ===
No.	Title	Artists	Length
1.	"With You"	Kevin Oh	04:24
2.	"With You" (Inst.)		04:24
Total length:			08:48

== Ratings ==
- In this table, The blue numbers represent the lowest ratings and the red numbers represent the highest ratings.
- NR denotes that the drama did not rank in the top 20 daily programs on that date.

Ep.	Broadcast date	Average audience share			
Ep.	Broadcast date	TNmS		AGB Nielsen	
Ep.	Broadcast date	Nationwide	Seoul	Nationwide	Seoul
1	August 9, 2017	3.9% (NR)	4.5% (NR)	3.1% (NR)	3.7% (NR)
2	August 10, 2017	3.0% (NR)	3.7% (NR)	2.8% (NR)	3.5% (NR)
3	August 16, 2017	3.4% (NR)	3.8% (NR)	2.2% (NR)	2.5% (NR)
4	August 17, 2017	3.1% (NR)	3.5% (NR)	2.0% (NR)	2.4% (NR)
5	August 23, 2017	3.0% (NR)	3.6% (NR)	2.0% (NR)	2.7% (NR)
6	August 24, 2017	2.5% (NR)	2.8% (NR)	2.1% (NR)	2.4% (NR)
7	August 30, 2017	2.3% (NR)	3.1% (NR)	2.0% (NR)	2.8% (NR)
8	August 31, 2017	2.2% (NR)	2.7% (NR)	1.4% (NR)	1.9% (NR)
9	September 6, 2017	2.5% (NR)	2.8% (NR)	2.2% (NR)	2.3% (NR)
10	September 7, 2017	2.5% (NR)	2.9% (NR)	1.8% (NR)	2.2% (NR)
11	September 13, 2017	2.5% (NR)	2.9% (NR)	2.1% (NR)	2.5% (NR)
12	September 14, 2017	2.4% (NR)	2.6% (NR)	1.9% (NR)	2.1% (NR)
13	September 20, 2017	2.6% (NR)	3.3% (NR)	2.6% (NR)	3.4% (NR)
14	September 21, 2017	2.6% (NR)	3.3% (NR)	2.3% (NR)	3.0% (NR)
15	September 27, 2017	2.7% (NR)	3.6% (NR)	1.9% (NR)	2.8% (NR)
16	September 28, 2017	2.5% (NR)	3.2% (NR)	1.9% (NR)	2.6% (NR)
Average		2.7%	3.3%	2.1%	2.7%

== Awards and nominations ==
Year	Award	Category	Nominee	Result	Ref.
2017	31st KBS Drama Awards	Best Supporting Actress	Jung Hye-sung	Won	
