= Bronchitis kettle =

Early air humidifier

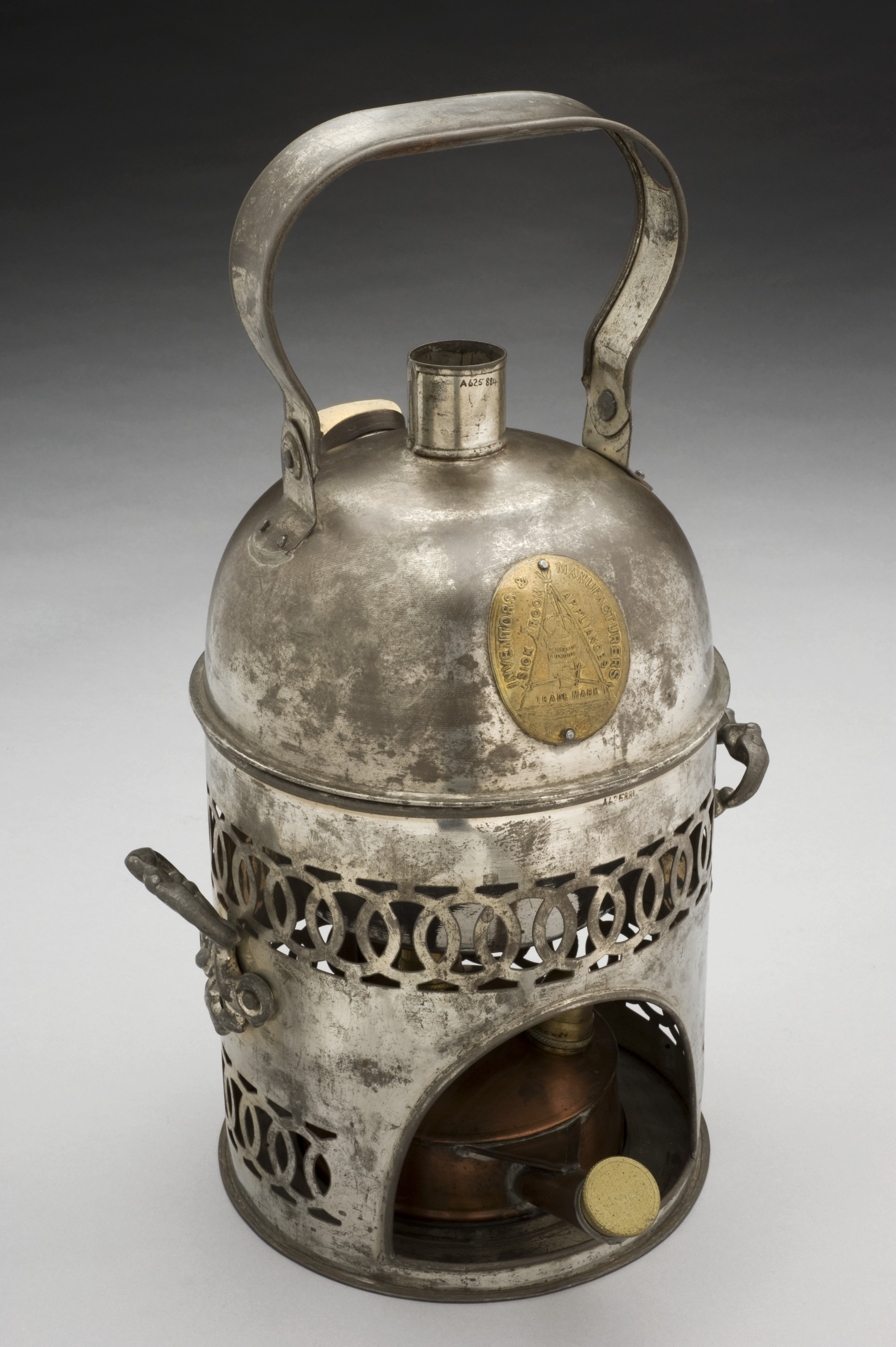
Bronchitis kettle

The bronchitis kettle, typified by a long spout, was used in the nineteenth and twentieth centuries to moisten the air for a sufferer of bronchitis, and was considered to make it easier to breathe for the patient. Sometimes menthol was added to the water to relieve congestion. The water was boiled on the fireplace in the room, or above a spirit lamp, or, in the twentieth century, by electricity. Sometimes the kettle was boiled within a tent placed around the patient.
