= Polyhexamethylene guanidine =

Polymer

Names
- IUPAC name Poly(iminocarbonimidoylimino-1,6-hexanediyl)
- Other names: Polyhexamethyleneguanidine; Polisept

Identifiers
CAS Number	31961-54-3; 89697-78-9 (phosphate); 57028-96-3 (HCl)
Abbreviations	PHMG, PHMG-P
ChemSpider	none
UNII	KYU75D2TUQ

Properties
Chemical formula	(C_{7}H_{15}N_{3})_{n}
Solubility in water	280 g/L
- Except where otherwise noted, data are given for materials in their standard state (at 25 °C [77 °F], 100 kPa). Infobox references

Polyhexamethylene guanidine (PHMG) is a guanidine derivative that is used as a biocidal disinfectant, often in the form of its salt polyhexamethylene guanidine phosphate (PHMG-P).

Studies have shown that PHMG in solution has fungicidal as well as bactericidal activity against both Gram-positive and Gram-negative bacteria. The substance also has detergent, anti-corrosive, and flocculant properties and prevents biofouling. PHMG-P is a white powdered solid, and as all polyguanidine salts, readily soluble in water.

== Toxicity ==
Unlike the related polymer polyhexanide (PHMB), PHMG has been described as a relatively new compound with properties, potency, and effects being not yet fully recognized. Preliminary findings indicate that PHMG and its derivatives primarily rely on damaging the cell membrane by inhibiting the activity of cellular dehydrogenases.

When PHMG is aerosolized and inhaled, it harms the lungs, causing death of the cells lining the bronchioles and widespread damage to alveoli, along with bronchiolitis obliterans, an often fatal form of non-reversible obstructive lung disease in which the bronchiole are compressed and narrowed by fibrosis (scar tissue) and/or inflammation.

== Uses ==
PHMG was used in Russia to disinfect hospitals and from the start of the 1990s, it was widely used in South Korea as a disinfectant to prevent microbial contamination in household humidifiers. PHMG was "originally marketed for cleaning a humidifier's water tank but instead used by the public as a water additive to suppress microbial growth."

== South Korean lung disease outbreak and deaths ==
The pulmonary toxicity of PHMG was discovered due to an outbreak of lung diseases in South Korea, detected in children between 2006 and 2011, and in adults in the spring of 2011; the mortality rate in children was 58%, while among adults, 53% died or required lung transplantation. Korean government officially recognized 1,814 dead and 7,837 injured victims, however, according to Korea national apparatus, Social Disasters Commission, including unreported cases, estimated 20,366 deaths, 950,000 health damages, and 8,940,000 exposures occurred between 1994 and 2011 due to PHMG. Autopsies and epidemiological work, followed up by animal studies, led the South Korean CDC to identify PHMG used in humidifiers as the cause. It was banned in 2011, and new cases ceased occurring.

Reckitt Benckiser was one of the companies that sold this product in South Korea and it resisted taking responsibility until May 2016, when the Korean division chief apologized to victims and families in a press conference and offered compensation to the families of those who died to those who were injured; it was the first time the company had acknowledged that its products containing PHMG were harmful.
