= Papaya (group) =

South Korean girl group

- Origin: Seoul, South Korea
- Genres: K-pop, dance-pop
- Years active: 2000–2001
- Labels: Winsome Media; Cream Entertainment
- Past members: Kang Kyoung-ah (2000); Joo Yeun-jung; Cho Hye-kyung; Hwang Yoon-mi (2000); Kang Se-jung

Papaya (Korean: 파파야) was a pop girl group from South Korea. They released two albums before becoming inactive.

== History ==
Papaya's first album, entitled 동화 ("Fairy Tale"), was distributed by 1 Star Music and Synnara Music on August 4, 2000, and featured five members (Kang Se-jung, Joo Yeun-jung, Cho Hye-kyung, Hwang Yoon-mi, and Kang Kyoung-ah). Due to their unpopularity, Hwang Yoon-mi and Kang Kyoung-ah left the group before the release of their second album, Violet, released on May 22, 2001, under the Cream Entertainment music label.

== Members ==
- Kang Kyoung-ah (강경아) [2000]
- Joo Yeun-jung (주연정)
- Cho Hye-kyung (조혜경)
- Hwang Yoon-mi (황윤미) [2000]
- Kang Se-jung (강세정)

== Post-disbandment activities ==
Kang Se-jung went on to acting, initially credited under stage name Go Na-eun. In 2009, she starred in Assorted Gems. She won the Excellence Award, Actress in the 2009 MBC Drama Awards for her role as eldest daughter, Gung Bi-chwi.

Hwang Yoon-mi also turned to acting and uses stage name Go Eun-chae. In September 2012, Go married musical actor Park Eun-tae.

Jo Hye-kyung became a Trot singer, using the stage name Jo Eun-sae. In 2014, she released single '비비고 (Rubbing)'.

== Discography ==
=== Studio albums ===
Title	Album details	Peak chart positions	Sales
Title	Album details	KOR	Sales
Fairy Tale (동화)	Released: August 16, 2000; Label: Winsome Media, 1 Star Music, Synnara Music; Format: CD, cassette; Track listing: 1. 있을 때 잘하기 (Live House); 2. 탐 3. Smile Smile; 4. 내 얘길 들어봐; 5. 꼭 약속해; 6. Special; 7. 배려; 8. 바람끼; 9. 가면; 10. 있을 때 잘하기 (Original Ver.); 11. Special (Remix)	27	KOR: 32,947+
Violet	Released: May 22, 2001; Label: Winsome Media, Cream Entertainment; Format: CD, cassette; Track listing: 1. Violet; 2. 아찔; 3. 사랑만들기; 4. 이제; 5. Don't Move; 6. 배반; 7. 참 8. 스무살; 9. 사랑의 속삭임; 10. Passion Of Love; 11. Broken; 12. 사랑만들기 (Club Remix)	29	KOR: 28,012+
