= Kim Nam-joo =

Kim Nam-joo may refer to:

- Kim Nam-joo (actress) (born 1971), South Korean actress known for Model
- Kim Nam-joo (singer) or Namjoo (born 1995), South Korean singer with Apink and actress
