= Park Ji-eun =

South Korean screenwriter (born 1976)

- Born: 1976 (age 49–50); South Korea
- Education: Chonnam National University – Bachelor's degree in Korean Language and Literature; Sejong University Graduate School – Master's degree in Film Arts
- Occupation: Screenwriter
- Years active: 1997–present
- Agent(s): Culture Depot (a subsidiary of Studio Dragon)

Korean name
- Hangul: 박지은
- RR: Bak Jieun
- MR: Pak Chiŭn

Park Ji-eun (born 1976) is a South Korean television screenwriter. She wrote the hit Korean dramas Queen of Housewives (2009), My Husband Got a Family (2012), My Love from the Star (2013–2014), The Producers (2015), The Legend of the Blue Sea (2016), Crash Landing on You (2019-2020), and Queen of Tears (2024).

== Career ==
=== Early works ===
Park Ji-eun began her entertainment career in 1997, and spent the next decade writing for talk radio shows, variety shows and sitcoms.

In 2007, she wrote Love Isn't Stop, a TV movie with an omnibus format, which aired on cable channel KBS N. This led to her first drama miniseries Get Karl! Oh Soo-jung, which she co-wrote with Park Hye-ryun. Starring Uhm Jung-hwa and Oh Ji-ho, it was based on the real-life love story of Lee Ju-young, the CEO of a TV production company who reunited with her husband, pro-golfer Go Man-soo, ten years after breaking up with him.

=== Queen of Housewives ===
For Park's first solo writing credit, she wrote Queen of Housewives (also known as My Wife Is a Superwoman) which aired in 2009. The comedy-drama series depicted naejo in a modern setting, traditional Korean housewives who devote their entire lives to their husbands' success. It revolved around three couples entangled in love and rivalry as they work for the Queens Food corporation, played by Kim Nam-joo, Oh Ji-ho, Lee Hye-young, Choi Cheol-ho, Yoon Sang-hyun and Sunwoo Sun. The drama was notable for being Kim Nam-joo's comeback after an eight-year hiatus from acting, in the role of a former prom queen-turned-dowdy housewife struggling to help her socially inept husband rise up the corporate ranks, while contending with a clique of wives led by a frenemy who is now the wife of her husband's boss. Queen of Housewives topped the ratings chart during its run (with a peak of 31.7%), started new fashion and makeup trends among married women (or ajummas), and also served as Yoon Sang-hyun's breakout vehicle. Park won Writer of the Year at the MBC Drama Awards.

=== Queen of Reversals ===
A year later, Park wrote Queen of Reversals, again casting Kim Nam-joo as the protagonist. Kim pointed to Park's ability to write realistic lines as one of the biggest reasons why she decided to sign on, while Park said that couples who straddle married life and the workplace would be able to easily relate to her drama. Despite similar themes, Reversals is not a sequel or spin-off of Housewives, with a completely new cast (except for Kim) and characters. While her previous drama depicted the lives of Korean housewives and their under-appreciated efforts, Park's next series explored the hardships of working women who must also juggle being wives and mothers as soon as they get home. Kim played a strong-willed, ruthless career woman who quits work after getting married, but a happy domestic life eludes her as her husband (Jung Joon-ho) struggles professionally. When he gets fired, she re-enters the workplace and takes problems into her own hands as the family's breadwinner, eventually catching the eye of her boss (Park Si-hoo). Queen of Reversals was not as successful in the ratings as its predecessor, staying within the mid-10% range.

=== My Husband Got a Family ===
In Park's third collaboration with Kim Nam-joo, they had an even bigger hit with My Husband Got a Family (also known as You Who Rolled in Unexpectedly and Unexpected You). During its more than five-month run, it topped the weekly ratings chart for 25 consecutive weeks and received average ratings of 33.1% and a peak of 52.3%. The series ranked number one overall on the 2012 yearly TV ratings chart. The plot centered on a successful TV director (Kim) who marries an orphaned doctor (Yoo Jun-sang), but her husband finds his biological parents and they happen to be her next-door neighbors with whom she bickers on a daily basis; she now faces the unexpected burden of having to build a relationship with her new-found in-laws and their sprawling extended family. Producer Kim Sung-geun attributed its success to the increasing popularity of TV dramas that portray the lives of working women in their 30s and 40s, a genre in which Park is one of the most high-profile Korean screenwriters. Kim Nam-joo described Park as being "able to take a double-edged approach to her subject matter. The tone is both comical and serious, without getting too skewed to one side." Though this was her first weekend family drama, Park was praised for being well-versed in dialogue that resonated with modern-day women, and developing multiple characters in the 19-member ensemble cast. She won recognition for her writing from several organizations, including the Korea Drama Awards, the K-Drama Star Awards, and the KBS Drama Awards.

=== My Love from the Star ===
In 2013, Park explored the fantasy/romantic comedy genre with My Love from the Star (also known as You Who Came from the Stars). She cast Jun Ji-hyun (in her first TV drama in 14 years) and Kim Soo-hyun in a tale about an alien who landed on Earth in the Joseon Dynasty, disguising his identity for over four centuries and becoming cynical about human beings, until he falls in love with a top actress in the modern era. Not only was the series a hit with a peak viewership rating of 28.1%, it also influenced Korean fashion, with clothes, accessories and make-up products worn by Jun seeing an "unprecedented" surge in sales.

It also became massively popular in China, where it became the most expensive Korean drama sold as of February 2014, was viewed more than 14.5 billion times on the online video platform iQIYI as of February 2014, and sparked a craze for the snack chimaek (Korean fried chicken and beer). In an op-ed piece published by the China Daily, writer Xiao Lixin attributed its success to "great innovations in South Korean TV productions in terms of themes and narrative patterns," praising the plot as "logical and fast-paced" interspersed with "whimsy and romantic punch lines." The Washington Post reported in March 2014 that My Love from the Star was discussed at China's National People's Congress, particularly in a committee of political advisory body Chinese People's Political Consultative Conference, where it reportedly topped the agenda among delegates from the culture and entertainment industry.

But Park also became embroiled in a plagiarism suit when author Kang Kyung-ok alleged that the series' concept and characters shared too many similarities with her 2008 comic book Seol-hee. Park has denied the claims, posting on the website of production company HB Entertainment a detailed account of how she came up with the idea many years ago, and swore that she "had never heard of or read Seol-hee."

=== The Producers ===
Park returned to her variety roots in 2015 with The Producers, using an experimental format that combined scripted and reality television. She collaborated with a crew largely composed of variety regulars led by Seo Soo-min, chief producer of the Happy Sunday programming block. The series reunited Park with My Love from the Star leading man Kim Soo-hyun, who starred alongside Cha Tae-hyun, Gong Hyo-jin and IU in a story set in real-life network KBS and focuses on fictional employees of its variety department. The Producers was the first ever Korean network drama to air in the Friday-Saturday time slot, which was usually reserved for late-night comedy shows; network dramas had previously been strictly divided into weekday and weekend programs.

=== The Legend of the Blue Sea ===
Park's subsequent project reunited her with My Love from the Star lead actress Jun Ji-hyun. Lee Min-ho starred as the lead actor. Titled The Legend of the Blue Sea, the drama is based on a Joseon-era legend. The drama aired at the end of 2016 on SBS. The television series centers on the love story of Heo Joon-jae, the son of a rich businessman who becomes a clever con-artist after his parents' divorce, and a mermaid named Shim Cheong. Focusing on rebirth, fate, and unrequited love, their tale is juxtaposed with the parallel story of their Joseon era incarnations, town head Kim Dam-ryeong and the mermaid Se-hwa. The show started with a strong 16.4% viewership rating nationwide, reaching as high as 20.7 percent for certain scenes, according to Nielsen Korea and surpassed the 20% mark in the metropolitan area by its sixth episode. The series maintained the first-place ranking for its timeslot and surpassed 20% viewership ratings. The series also fared well overseas, having been exported to all major regions around the world, including Southeast Asia, the Americas and Europe.

=== Crash Landing on You ===
Park made her return to writing dramas in 2019 with Crash Landing on You, starring popular actors, Hyun Bin and Son Ye-jin as the main leads. It tells the story of two star crossed lovers, a South Korean heiress and a North Korean elite who also happens to be an army officer. One day, while paragliding, Yoon Se-ri (Son Ye-jin) has an accident caused by strong winds, leading her to crash land in North Korea, where she meets Ri Jeong-hyuk (Hyun Bin), a North Korean army officer, who agrees to help her return to South Korea. Over time, they fall in love, despite the divide and dispute between their respective countries. It is the highest rated tvN drama and the third-highest-rated Korean drama in cable television history. The drama got high praise for its originality and the way the plot was played out. It was also immensely popular among fans all over Asia. It consistently remained in the Top Ten on Netflix in almost all major Asian markets and accumulated 1.75 billion online views globally.

== Filmography ==
=== Television ===
Year	Title	Network	Episodes	TV Rating			Ref.
Year	Title	Network	Episodes	Highest	Lowest	Average	Ref.
2007	Get Karl! Oh Soo-jung	SBS	16	15.5%	11.6%	13.7%	
2009	Queen of Housewives	MBC	20	31.7%	8.0%	21.0%	
2010–2011	Queen of Reversals	MBC	31	14.6%	8.4%	10.8%	
2012	My Husband Got a Family	KBS2	58	49.2%	24.5%	35.7%	
2013–2014	My Love from the Star	SBS	21	28.1%	15.6%	24.0%	
2015	The Producers	KBS2	12	17.7%	10.1%	12.5%	
2016–2017	The Legend of the Blue Sea	SBS	20	21.0%	15.1%	17.6%	
2019–2020	Crash Landing on You	tvN	16	21.7%	6.1%	12.2%	
2024	Queen of Tears	tvN	16	24.9%	5.9%	15.7%	
TBA	Soul †	TBA	TBA				

=== Sitcom ===
- Look Back with a Smile (KBS2, 2006) (starring Lee Deok-hwa, Park Sang-myun and Nam Bo-ra)
- Dal-rae's House (KBS2, 2004) (starring Kim Yong-gun, Yeo Woon-kay, Kyeon Mi-ri and Kim Chung)
- Great Friends (KBS2, 2000) (starring Yoo Jae-suk, Nam Hee-seok and Lee Hwi-jae)

=== Variety show ===
- I Want to Meet You (MBC, 2003–2007) (with Nam Hee-seok and Park Na-rim)
- Story Land Surprise (SBS, 2002)
- Love Story (KBS2, 2002–2003) (with Nam Hee-seok and Eugene)
- Weird Theater – The Story of Two Men (KBS2, 2002)
- Comedy House (MBC, 2000–2005)
- Touch Preview Comedy File (KBS2, 1999–2002)
- The Clinic for Married Couples: Love and War (KBS2)

=== Radio program ===
- 2 o'clock Date with Yoon Jong-shin (MBC Radio)
- Good Morning FM with Kim Sung-joo (MBC Radio)
- Golden Disk Music Essay with Kim Ki-duk (MBC Radio)

=== Music video ===
- Script for Tim's "I Was Thankful" (2004)

== Awards ==
- 2024 Asian Television Awards: Best Scriptwriting (Queen of Tears)
- 2014 Korean Popular Culture and Arts Awards: Prime Minister's Commendation (My Love from the Star)
- 2012 KBS Drama Awards: Best Writer (My Husband Got a Family)
- 2012 1st K-Drama Star Awards: Best Writer (My Husband Got a Family)
- 2012 Ministry of Culture, Sports and Tourism's Korea Content Awards: Commendation (My Husband Got a Family)
- 2012 5th Korea Drama Awards: Best Writer (My Husband Got a Family)
- 2009 MBC Drama Awards: Writer of the Year (Queen of Housewives)
- 2020 CJ ENM Visionary
