= Go Na-eun =

- Hangul: 고나은
- RR: Go Naeun
- MR: Ko Naŭn

Go Na-eun may refer to:

- Kang Se-jung (born 1982), she used Go Na-eun as stage name from 2004 to 2017.
- Go Woo-ri (born 1988), she changed her name from Go Woo-ri to Go Na-eun in 2018, using Go Woo-ri as the stage name since 2019.
