= My Husband Got a Family =

2012 South Korean television series

- Promotional poster
- Also known as: Unexpected You; You Tumbled into My Life; You're a Stroke of Good Luck
- Hangul: 넝쿨째 굴러온 당신
- RR: Neongkuljjae gulleoon dangsin
- MR: Nŏngk'ultchae kullŏon tangsin
- Genre: Romance; Comedy; Family
- Written by: Park Ji-eun
- Directed by: Kim Hyung-suk
- Starring: Kim Nam-joo; Yoo Jun-sang; Youn Yuh-jung
- Country of origin: South Korea
- Original language: Korean
- No. of episodes: 58

Production
- Executive producer: Lee Jang-soo
- Producer: Kim Sung-geun
- Camera setup: Single camera
- Running time: 70 minutes
- Production company: Logos Film

Original release
- Network: KBS2
- Release: February 25 – September 9, 2012

Related
- Mi marido tiene familia

My Husband Got a Family (Korean: 넝쿨째 굴러온 당신) is a 2012 South Korean television series starring Kim Nam-joo, Yoo Jun-sang, and Youn Yuh-jung. It aired on KBS2 from February 25 to September 9, 2012 on Saturdays and Sundays at 19:55 for 58 episodes.

The weekend family drama centres on a working woman named Cha Yoon-hee (played by Kim Nam-joo) as her husband, who was put up for international adoption to the United States and is a surgeon, reunites with his biological parents. Yoon-hee faces the unexpected burden of having to build a relationship with her new-found in-laws.

During its more than five-month run, it topped the weekly ratings chart for 25 consecutive weeks and reached a ratings peak of 45.8 percent (TNmS) and 52.3 percent (AGB Nielsen). The series ranked number one overall on the 2012 yearly TV ratings chart.

== Plot ==
Cha Yoon-hee (Kim Nam-joo) is a successful TV drama producer/director who marries an orphaned surgeon (Yoo Jun-sang) and thereby acquires the supposed, ultimate career woman's dream―accomplished husband minus the in-laws. Her marital bliss is shattered when her husband finds his birth parents and they happen to be her next-door neighbours with whom she bickers on a daily basis, and feature not one, but three sisters-in-law, and the usual array of aunts and grandmothers-in-law. Yoon-hee realises she has married more than she has bargained for. Once again, the stage is set for a butting of the heads between daughter and mother-in-law (Youn Yuh-jung).

== Cast ==
- Kim Nam-joo as Cha Yoon-hee

Terry Kang wife; Se-joong's younger sister and Se-kwang older sister. She is a TV Show Programme Director at KBS.

- Yoo Jun-sang as Terry Kang / Bang Gwi-nam

Yoon-hee's husband; Il-sook's younger brother and older brother of Yi-sook and Mal-sook. He is a Surgeon of Hospital that affirmed by Medical school of Seoul National University

=== Cha Yoon-hee's family ===
- Kim Young-ran as Han Man-hee

Se-joong, Yoon-hee, and Se-kwang's mother; Ji-young and Terry Kang's mother-in-law

- Kim Yong-hee as Cha Se-joong

Yoon-hee and Se-kwang's older brother

- Jin Kyung as Min Ji-young

Se-joong's wife and Korean language teacher at middle school

- Kang Min-hyuk as Cha Se-kwang

Se-joong and Yoon-hee's younger brother. He is a student of KAIST who reads Mechanical Engineering and Robotics

=== Bang Chang-soo's house ===
- Kang Boo-ja as Jeon Mak-rye

Il-sook, Gwi-nam, Yi-sook, and Mal-sook's grandmother; Jang-soo, Jung-hoon, and Jung-bae's mother; Chung-ae, Yang-shil, and Go Ok's mother-in-law

- Jang Yong as Bang Jang-soo

Chung-ae's husband; Il-sook, Gwi-nam, Yi-sook, and Mal-sook's father; He is a baker who owns bakery and usually bake bread and pastry.

- Youn Yuh-jung as Uhm Chung-ae

Jang-soo's wife; Il-sook, Gwi-nam, Yi-sook, and Mal-sook's mother.

- Yang Jung-a as Bang Il-sook

Gwi-nam, Yi-sook, and Mal-sook's older sister; Nam Nam-goo's ex-wife; Nam Min-ji's mother.

- Jo Yoon-hee as Bang Yi-sook.

Il-sook and Gwi-nam younger sister; Mal-sook's older sister. She is a talented furniture carpenter but gets a job at an Italian restaurant owned by Chun Jae Yong in order to supporther sister-at-law Cha Yoon Hee.

- Oh Yeon-seo as Bang Mal-sook

Il-sook, Gwi-nam, and Yi-sook younger sister. She is a coordinator at Plastic surgery.

- Jeon Hwi-heon as Nam Min-ji

Il-sook and Nam-goo's daughter; Gwi-nam, Yi-sook, and Mal-sook's niece

=== Bang Jung-hoon's family ===
- Song Geum-shik as Bang Jung-hoon

Yang-shil's husband; Il-sook, Gwi-nam, Yi-sook, and Mal-sook's younger uncle. He works at Construction company as executive.

- Na Young-hee as Jang Yang-shil

Jung-hoon's wife; Il-sook, Gwi-nam, Yi-sook, and Mal-sook's uncle's wife

=== Bang Jung-bae's family ===
- Kim Sang-ho as Bang Jung-bae

Go-ok's husband; Il-sook, Gwi-nam, Yi-sook, and Mal-sook's youngest uncle; Jang-goon's father.

- Shim Yi-young as Go-ok

Jung-bae's wife; Il-sook, Gwi-nam, Yi-sook, and Mal-sook's uncle's wife; Jang-goon's mother

- Kwak Dong-yeon as Bang Jang-goon

Jung-bae and Go-ok's son; Il-sook, Gwi-nam, Yi-sook, and Mal-sook's cousin

=== Chung-ae's sister ===
- Yu Ji-in as Uhm Bo-ae

Chung-ae's younger sister; Soon-ae's older sister; Il-sook, Gwi-nam, Yi-sook, and Mal-sook aunt

- Yang Hee-kyung as Uhm Soon-ae

Chung-ae and Bo-ae's younger sister; Il-sook, Gwi-nam, Yi-sook, and Mal-sook aunt

=== Extended ===
- Lee Hee-joon as Chun Jae-yong

Yoon-hee's old student; Italian Restaurant owner and from Daegu, Gyeongbuk.

- Kim Won-jun as Yoon Bin

Former idol

- Park Soo-jin as Song Soo-jin

A doctor at Gwi Nam's hospital and childhood friend from the US

- Kim Hyung-bum as Nam Nam-goo

Il-sook's ex-husband; Min-ji's father.

- Kang Dong-ho as Han Kyu-hyun

Yi-sook's first love and a lawyer.

- Lim Geu-rin as Unknown

Bakery's employee

- Kim Hyung-jin as Tae-young

Restaurant Staff

- Geun Ho-seok as Yoo Beom

Se-kwang's friend

- Lee Ga-ryeong as Yoo Shin-hye's colleague

=== Cameo appearances ===
- Park Min-jung as Seo Yoo-rim

Actress acting in the drama Yoon-hee is producing

- Go Do-young as Yoon-hee's workplace junior
- Go Seo-hee as Writer writing the drama Yoon-hee is producing
- Jung Chang-sung as Chief secretary
- Lee Chae-min as Customer
- Lee Jae-yong as Jae-yong's father
- Kil Yong-woo as Gwi-nam's adoptive father
- Kim Chang-sook as Gwi-nam's adoptive mother
- Kwak Min-suk as PD Ji
- Lee Do-hyun as Ji-hwan
- Hwang Dong-joo as Fake Gwi-nam
- Yoo In-young as Yoo Shin-hye
- Choi Yoon-so as Kang Hye-soo
- Kim Seung-woo as man studying for the bar exams (ep 5–6)
- Kim Jang-hoon as Yoon Bin's sunbae (ep 16)
- Hong Eun-hee as a difficult actress (ep 18)
- Ji Jin-hee as pastor (ep 19)
- Lee Soo-geun as Yoon Bin's ex-manager (ep 21)
- Cha Tae-hyun as Cha Tae-bong, Yoon-hee's ex-boyfriend (ep 26)
- Sung Si-kyung as has-been singer Sung Si-kaeng (ep 32)
- ZE:A as themselves (ep 39)
- Song Joon-geun as top drama actor (ep 40)
- Lee Hye-young as top drama actress (ep 40)
- Lee Jung-shin as Mal-sook's blind date (ep 42)
- Kim Jong-min as audition judge (ep 46)
- Shin Se-kyung as Shin Se-kyung (ep 49)
- Kim Joon-hyun as variety show PD
- Lee Jong-hak as singing instructor
- Yang Hee-eun as radio DJ
- Kim Kyung-jin as Teuk Byeol-chul
- Tak Jae-hoon as marketer
- Jung Kyung-mi as Yoon Bin's mom fan
- Kim Seo-hyung as Jae-yong's first sister
- Jo Ha-rang as Jae-yong's second sister
- Lee Je-in as Jae-yong's youngest sister
- Gong Hyung-jin as man arguing with Yoon-hee
- Park So-hyun as radio DJ

== Ratings ==
- In the table below, the blue numbers represent the lowest ratings and the red numbers represent the highest ratings.

Episode #	Date	Average audience share			
Episode #	Date	TNmS Ratings		AGB Nielsen	
Episode #	Date	Nationwide	Seoul	Nationwide	Seoul
01	2012-02-25	24.5% (1st)	21.9% (1st)	22.3% (1st)	22.3% (1st)
02	2012-02-26	29.3% (1st)	29.4% (1st)	28.9% (1st)	30.0% (1st)
03	2012-03-03	26.2% (1st)	26.2% (1st)	25.7% (1st)	26.3% (1st)
04	2012-03-04	30.2% (1st)	30.2% (1st)	29.9% (1st)	30.4% (1st)
05	2012-03-10	27.2% (1st)	26.7% (1st)	26.9% (1st)	27.0% (1st)
06	2012-03-11	32.5% (1st)	31.4% (1st)	32.8% (1st)	33.5% (1st)
07	2012-03-17	30.3% (1st)	31.1% (1st)	27.0% (1st)	26.9% (1st)
08	2012-03-18	35.2% (1st)	35.6% (1st)	32.8% (1st)	33.5% (1st)
09	2012-03-24	30.5% (1st)	30.2% (1st)	29.1% (1st)	29.7% (1st)
10	2012-03-25	38.5% (1st)	39.6% (1st)	36.1% (1st)	36.3% (1st)
11	2012-03-31	33.9% (1st)	33.1% (1st)	30.1% (1st)	30.3% (1st)
12	2012-04-01	36.2% (1st)	36.2% (1st)	35.6% (1st)	35.4% (1st)
13	2012-04-07	32.2% (1st)	32.6% (1st)	27.8% (1st)	27.6% (1st)
14	2012-04-08	35.6% (1st)	37.3% (1st)	34.3% (1st)	34.9% (1st)
15	2012-04-14	30.4% (1st)	30.7% (1st)	27.2% (1st)	27.2% (1st)
16	2012-04-15	38.6% (1st)	40.3% (1st)	34.5% (1st)	34.6% (1st)
17	2012-04-21	36.3% (1st)	37.8% (1st)	32.4% (1st)	33.2% (1st)
18	2012-04-22	38.9% (1st)	42.3% (1st)	36.4% (1st)	37.7% (1st)
19	2012-04-28	32.2% (1st)	33.3% (1st)	30.1% (1st)	31.2% (1st)
20	2012-04-29	36.0% (1st)	37.6% (1st)	34.2% (1st)	34.5% (1st)
21	2012-05-05	29.0% (1st)	28.2% (1st)	26.0% (1st)	26.7% (1st)
22	2012-05-06	34.5% (1st)	37.5% (1st)	33.8% (1st)	35.2% (1st)
23	2012-05-12	29.4% (1st)	32.1% (1st)	29.3% (1st)	30.9% (1st)
24	2012-05-13	36.1% (1st)	39.3% (1st)	34.9% (1st)	35.8% (1st)
25	2012-05-19	32.0% (1st)	34.7% (1st)	30.6% (1st)	31.7% (1st)
26	2012-05-20	35.4% (1st)	38.3% (1st)	34.0% (1st)	35.2% (1st)
27	2012-05-26	29.9% (1st)	31.1% (1st)	27.2% (1st)	28.2% (1st)
28	2012-05-27	34.6% (1st)	37.6% (1st)	33.1% (1st)	34.9% (1st)
29	2012-06-02	30.9% (1st)	31.5% (1st)	29.6% (1st)	30.1% (1st)
30	2012-06-03	37.1% (1st)	39.5% (1st)	35.3% (1st)	35.7% (1st)
31	2012-06-09	32.0% (1st)	34.3% (1st)	29.8% (1st)	30.3% (1st)
32	2012-06-10	37.4% (1st)	40.3% (1st)	37.3% (1st)	39.2% (1st)
33	2012-06-16	33.6% (1st)	35.2% (1st)	30.2% (1st)	31.7% (1st)
34	2012-06-17	39.2% (1st)	42.0% (1st)	36.2% (1st)	37.8% (1st)
35	2012-06-23	35.0% (1st)	36.3% (1st)	31.5% (1st)	32.7% (1st)
36	2012-06-24	39.8% (1st)	42.5% (1st)	37.0% (1st)	37.9% (1st)
37	2012-06-30	37.3% (1st)	37.4% (1st)	34.2% (1st)	35.5% (1st)
38	2012-07-01	40.5% (1st)	42.0% (1st)	36.7% (1st)	37.1% (1st)
39	2012-07-07	34.4% (1st)	35.9% (1st)	31.2% (1st)	32.4% (1st)
40	2012-07-08	41.4% (1st)	42.8% (1st)	38.2% (1st)	38.1% (1st)
41	2012-07-14	39.2% (1st)	39.2% (1st)	36.2% (1st)	36.9% (1st)
42	2012-07-15	46.0% (1st)	48.6% (1st)	41.9% (1st)	42.7% (1st)
43	2012-07-21	36.6% (1st)	37.9% (1st)	30.5% (1st)	32.1% (1st)
44	2012-07-22	44.0% (1st)	46.9% (1st)	37.6% (1st)	38.6% (1st)
45	2012-07-28	32.5% (1st)	32.7% (1st)	26.7% (1st)	26.8% (1st)
46	2012-07-29	34.1% (1st)	36.5% (1st)	33.3% (1st)	34.7% (1st)
47	2012-08-04	27.8% (1st)	27.7% (1st)	27.5% (1st)	28.7% (1st)
48	2012-08-05	31.7% (1st)	33.4% (1st)	30.1% (1st)	29.9% (1st)
49	2012-08-11	32.5% (1st)	35.1% (1st)	30.1% (1st)	30.7% (1st)
50	2012-08-12	43.5% (1st)	45.5% (1st)	40.7% (1st)	43.1% (1st)
51	2012-08-18	39.4% (1st)	39.9% (1st)	35.2% (1st)	37.6% (1st)
52	2012-08-19	45.9% (1st)	47.4% (1st)	42.1% (1st)	44.3% (1st)
53	2012-08-25	39.5% (1st)	40.1% (1st)	35.4% (1st)	36.2% (1st)
54	2012-08-26	45.4% (1st)	47.0% (1st)	40.7% (1st)	41.6% (1st)
55	2012-09-01	40.5% (1st)	42.1% (1st)	36.3% (1st)	37.5% (1st)
56	2012-09-02	45.7% (1st)	46.4% (1st)	40.9% (1st)	42.2% (1st)
57	2012-09-08	42.3% (1st)	43.8% (1st)	37.5% (1st)	38.6% (1st)
58	2012-09-09	49.2% (1st)	49.6% (1st)	45.3% (1st)	46.3% (1st)
Average		35.7%	36.9%	33.1%	33.9%

== Awards and nominations ==
Year	Award	Category	Recipient	Result
2012	7th Seoul International Drama Awards	Outstanding Korean Drama	My Husband Got a Family	Nominated
2012	5th Korea Drama Awards	Grand Prize (Daesang)	Kim Nam-joo	Won
2012	5th Korea Drama Awards	Grand Prize (Daesang)	Youn Yuh-jung	Nominated
2012	5th Korea Drama Awards	Best Drama	My Husband Got a Family	Won
2012	5th Korea Drama Awards	Top Excellence Award, Actor	Yoo Jun-sang	Nominated
2012	5th Korea Drama Awards	Excellence Award, Actor	Lee Hee-joon	Won
2012	5th Korea Drama Awards	Best New Actor	Kang Min-hyuk	Nominated
2012	5th Korea Drama Awards	Best New Actress	Oh Yeon-seo	Nominated
2012	5th Korea Drama Awards	Best Young Actor	Kwak Dong-yeon	Won
2012	5th Korea Drama Awards	Best Writer	Park Ji-eun	Won
2012	5th Korea Drama Awards	Special Jury Prize for Acting	Lee Hee-joon	Won
2012	K-Drama Star Awards	Top Excellence Award, Actress	Kim Nam-joo	Won
2012	K-Drama Star Awards	Excellence Award, Actor	Yoo Jun-sang	Won
2012	K-Drama Star Awards	Rising Star Award	Oh Yeon-seo	Won
2012	K-Drama Star Awards	Rising Star Award	Kang Min-hyuk	Won
2012	K-Drama Star Awards	Best Writer	Park Ji-eun	Won
2012	K-Drama Star Awards	Top Popularity Award	Yoo Jun-sang	Won
2012	25th Grimae Awards	Best Actress	Kim Nam-joo	Won
2012	20th Korean Culture and Entertainment Awards	Grand Prize (Daesang) for TV Drama	Kim Nam-joo	Won
2012	20th Korean Culture and Entertainment Awards	Best Drama	My Husband Got a Family	Won
2012	20th Korean Culture and Entertainment Awards	Best Drama PD	Kim Hyung-suk	Won
2012	KBS Drama Awards	Grand Prize (Daesang)	Kim Nam-joo	Won
2012	KBS Drama Awards	Top Excellence Award, Actor	Yoo Jun-sang	Won
2012	KBS Drama Awards	Top Excellence Award, Actress	Kim Nam-joo	Nominated
2012	KBS Drama Awards	Top Excellence Award, Actress	Youn Yuh-jung	Nominated
2012	KBS Drama Awards	Excellence Award, Actor in a Serial Drama	Yoo Jun-sang	Nominated
2012	KBS Drama Awards	Excellence Award, Actress in a Serial Drama	Kim Nam-joo	Nominated
2012	KBS Drama Awards	Excellence Award, Actress in a Serial Drama	Youn Yuh-jung	Won
2012	KBS Drama Awards	Best Supporting Actor	Kim Sang-ho	Won
2012	KBS Drama Awards	Best Supporting Actress	Jo Yoon-hee	Won
2012	KBS Drama Awards	Best Supporting Actress	Jin Kyung	Nominated
2012	KBS Drama Awards	Best New Actor	Kang Min-hyuk	Nominated
2012	KBS Drama Awards	Best New Actor	Lee Hee-joon	Won
2012	KBS Drama Awards	Best New Actress	Oh Yeon-seo	Won
2012	KBS Drama Awards	Best Young Actor	Kwak Dong-yeon	Nominated
2012	KBS Drama Awards	Best Writer	Park Ji-eun	Won
2012	KBS Drama Awards	Best Couple Award	Yoo Jun-sang and Kim Nam-joo	Won
2012	KBS Drama Awards	Best Couple Award	Lee Hee-joon and Jo Yoon-hee	Won
2013	49th Baeksang Arts Awards	Best Drama	My Husband Got a Family	Nominated
2013	49th Baeksang Arts Awards	Best Director (TV)	Kim Hyung-suk	Nominated
2013	49th Baeksang Arts Awards	Best Actor (TV)	Yoo Jun-sang	Nominated
2013	49th Baeksang Arts Awards	Best Actress (TV)	Kim Nam-joo	Nominated
2013	49th Baeksang Arts Awards	Best New Actor (TV)	Lee Hee-joon	Won
2013	49th Baeksang Arts Awards	Best Screenplay (TV)	Park Ji-eun	Nominated
2013	40th Korea Broadcasting Awards	Best Full-length Drama	My Husband Got a Family	Won

== International broadcast ==
It aired in Japan on cable channel KNTV from February 13 to June 26, 2013 under the title 棚ぼたのあなた (Your Windfall).

It aired in the Philippines via GMA Network on April 8, 2013 under the title Unexpected You.

It aired in Singapore on Channel U

It aired in Thailand on Workpoint TV on July 1, 2015 under the title s̄ap̣hı̂ cxm s̄æb สะใภ้จอมแสบ (Troublemaker Daughter-in-Law).

A Mexican channel recreated the drama with the title Mi marido tiene familia.
