= Model (TV series) =

South Korean television series

- Also known as: Models
- Genre: Romance, Drama
- Written by: Lee Yoon-taek; Kim Kyung-hee; Lee Sun-hee; Lee Kyung-hee
- Directed by: Lee Kwang-hoon
- Starring: Kim Nam-joo; Han Jae-suk; Jang Dong-gun; Yum Jung-ah; So Ji-sub
- Country of origin: South Korea
- Original language: Korean
- No. of episodes: 36

Production
- Producer: Lee Yong-seok
- Production location: Korea
- Running time: Wednesdays and Thursdays at 21:45 (KST)

Original release
- Network: Seoul Broadcasting System
- Release: 9 April – 7 August 1997

Model (Korean: 모델) is a 1997 South Korean television series starring Kim Nam-joo, Han Jae-suk, Jang Dong-gun, Yum Jung-ah and So Ji-sub. It aired on SBS from 9 April to 7 August 1997 on Wednesdays and Thursdays at 21:45 for 36 episodes.

Jang Hyuk made his television drama debut in the show.

== Plot ==
Song Kyung-rin is a fashion designer, but after top male model Jo Won-joon refused to work for her, she gets a taste of modeling and decides to become a model herself. Lee Jung just arrived in Korea from America and he, too, has an interest in modeling. Through fate, Jung helps out Kyung-rin and they fall in love. But behind Jung's return to Korea there is a deep, dark secret and a plan for revenge.

== Cast ==
- Kim Nam-joo as Song Kyung-rin
- Han Jae-suk as Jo Won-joon
- Jang Dong-gun as Lee Jung
- Yum Jung-ah as Park Soo-ah
- Lee Young-beom as Soo-ah's husband
- Song Seon-mi as Kim Yi-joo
- Lee Sun-jin as Na Pil-soon
- Jun Kwang-ryul as Yoo Jang-hyuk
- So Ji-sub as Song Kyung-chul
- Jang Hyuk as Joon-ho
- Yoo Hye-ri as Yu-ri
- Jung Dong-hwan
- Chun Ho-jin as Jo Tae-sik
- Ha Yoo-mi
- Yoon Young-joon
- Kim Yong-sun
- Seo Bum-shik
