= Good Job, Good Job =

- Promotional poster
- Also known as: Cheer Up on Love; Job Well Done; Well Done; Thumbs Up for a Job Well Done
- Genre: Romance; Drama; Family
- Written by: Park Ji-hyun
- Directed by: Kim Nam-won; Son Hyung-suk
- Starring: Chae Rim; Um Ki-joon; Kim Seung-soo; Kim Jung-hwa; Choi Daniel; Seo Hyo-rim
- Country of origin: South Korea
- Original language: Korean
- No. of episodes: 40

Production
- Producer: Lee Dae-young
- Running time: 70 minutes

Original release
- Network: Munhwa Broadcasting Corporation
- Release: March 14 – August 2, 2009

Good Job, Good Job (Korean: 잘했군 잘했어; RR: Jalhaetgun jalhaesseo) is a 2009 South Korean television series starring Chae Rim, Um Ki-joon, Kim Seung-soo, Kim Jung-hwa, Choi Daniel and Seo Hyo-rim. It aired on MBC from March 14 to August 2, 2009 on Saturdays and Sundays at 19:55 for 40 episodes.

== Plot ==
Lee Kang-joo is a ceramics technologist and single mother. Her ex-boyfriend Yoo Ho-nam hadn't known that she was pregnant when he left her to study abroad. Now a psychologist, he returns to Korea, but Kang-joo hides the fact that he's the father of her daughter, Byul. Meanwhile, Choi Seung-hyun is a fitness club owner and the son of Kang-joo's mentor and boss. He has loved Kang-joo since high school, but not wanting to lose their friendship, she's remained unresponsive to his romantic overtures.

== Cast ==
=== Main characters ===
- Chae Rim as Lee Kang-joo
- Um Ki-joon as Choi Seung-hyun
- Kim Seung-soo as Yoo Ho-nam
- Kim Jung-hwa as Na Mi-ra
- Choi Daniel as Lee Eun-hyuk
- Seo Hyo-rim as Ha Eun-bi

=== Supporting characters ===
- Kim Hae-sook as Wang Young-soon
- Joo Hyun as Lee Jung-jae
- Lee Han-wi as Mr. Min
- Jung Ae-ri as Jung Soo-hee
- Kang Boo-ja as Yoon Ok-rae
- Chun Ho-jin as Han Sung-hoon
- Yoon So-jung as Bae Jung-ja
- Jeon Min-seo as Lee Byul
- Kim Joo-hyuk as Lee Ho
- Won Jong-rye as Ho-nam's mother
- Kim Sun-hyuk as Yoo Ho-joon
- Ha Sung-chul as Coach Jang
- Lee El as Min-joo
- Park Ha-young as Na-yoon
- Lee Hyung-suk
- Han Young-kwang
- Go Da-mi
- Shin Young-jin
- Kang Min-hee

== Awards ==
2009 MBC Drama Awards

- Golden Acting Award, Veteran Actress: Jung Ae-ri
- Best Young Actress: Jeon Min-seo
