= 5th Korea Drama Awards =

2012 edition of award ceremony

- Date: October 2, 2012
- Site: Kyungnam Culture and Arts Center, Jinju, South Gyeongsang Province
- Hosted by: Jun Hyun-moo; Kim Eun-jung

The 5th Korea Drama Awards is an awards ceremony for excellence in television in South Korea. It was held at the Kyungnam Culture and Arts Center in Jinju, South Gyeongsang Province on October 2, 2012 and hosted by Jun Hyun-moo and Jewelry's Kim Eun-jung. The nominees were chosen from Korean dramas that aired from October 2011 to September 2012.

== Nominations and winners ==
(Winners denoted in bold)

Grand Prize (Daesang)	Best Drama
**Kim Nam-joo** – **My Husband Got a Family**; Han Suk-kyu – Deep Rooted Tree; Kim Soo-hyun – Moon Embracing the Sun; Uhm Tae-woong – Man from the Equator; Son Hyun-joo – The Chaser	**My Husband Got a Family (KBS2)**; A Gentleman's Dignity (SBS); Moon Embracing the Sun (MBC); The Chaser (SBS)
Best Production Director	Best Screenplay
**Jang Tae-yoo** – **Deep Rooted Tree**	**Park Ji-eun** – **My Husband Got a Family**
Top Excellence Award, Actor	Top Excellence Award, Actress
**Kim Sang-joong** – **The Chaser**; Lee Beom-soo – Dr. Jin, History of a Salaryman; So Ji-sub – Phantom; Son Hyun-joo – The Chaser; Yoo Jun-sang – My Husband Got a Family	**Han Ji-min** – **Rooftop Prince**; Jung Ryeo-won – History of a Salaryman; Kim Hyun-joo – Dummy Mommy; Shin Se-kyung – Fashion King; Soo Ae – A Thousand Days' Promise; Youn Yuh-jung – My Husband Got a Family
Excellence Award, Actor	Excellence Award, Actress
**Kwak Do-won** – **Phantom**; **Lee Hee-joon** – **My Husband Got a Family**; Kim Jae-joong – Dr. Jin; Lee Sung-min – Golden Time; Yoon Je-moon – Deep Rooted Tree	**Song Seon-mi** – **Golden Time**; Jang Shin-young – The Chaser; Jeon Mi-seon – Moon Embracing the Sun; Kim Hye-eun – Man from the Equator; Son Dam-bi – Lights and Shadows
Best New Actor	Best New Actress
**Seo In-guk** – **Love Rain**; Jo Jung-suk – The King 2 Hearts; Kang Min-hyuk – My Husband Got a Family; Park Yu-hwan – A Thousand Days' Promise; Yim Si-wan – Moon Embracing the Sun	**Yoon Jin-yi** – **A Gentleman's Dignity**; Hyolyn – Dream High 2; Jin Se-yeon – My Daughter the Flower; Kwon Yuri – Fashion King; Oh Yeon-seo – My Husband Got a Family
Best Young Actor/Actress	Best Couple Award
**Kwak Dong-yeon** – **My Husband Got a Family**; Kim Yoo-bin – Bravo, My Love!; Kim Yoo-jung – Moon Embracing the Sun; Kim So-hyun – Moon Embracing the Sun; Yeo Jin-goo – Moon Embracing the Sun	**Seo In-guk** and **Jung Eun-ji** – **Reply 1997**
Best Original Soundtrack	Special Jury Prize
**"Back in Time" (Lyn)** – **Moon Embracing the Sun**; "Missing You Like Crazy" (Kim Tae-yeon) – The King 2 Hearts; "My Love" (Lee Jong-hyun) – A Gentleman's Dignity; "One Person" (Huh Gak) – Big	**Lee Hee-joon** – **My Husband Got a Family**; **Queen Insoo**
