= Queen of Housewives =

South Korean television series

- Promotional poster
- Also known as: My Wife is a Superwoman
- Hangul: 내조의 여왕
- Hanja: 內助의 女王
- RR: Naejoui yeowang
- MR: Naejoŭi yŏwang
- Genre: Romance; Workplace comedy; Drama
- Written by: Park Ji-eun
- Directed by: Go Dong-sun
- Starring: Kim Nam-joo; Oh Ji-ho; Lee Hye-young; Yoon Sang-hyun; Choi Cheol-ho; Sunwoo Sun
- Music by: Park Ho-joon
- Country of origin: South Korea
- Original language: Korean
- No. of episodes: 20

Production
- Executive producers: Ko Dong seon Kim Seung mo
- Producer: Park Min-yeop
- Production location: South Korea
- Production company: DRM Media

Original release
- Network: MBC
- Release: March 16 – May 19, 2009

Related
- Queen of Reversals

Queen of Housewives (Korean: 내조의 여왕; also known as My Wife Is a Superwoman) is a 2009 South Korean romantic comedy television series, starring Kim Nam-joo, Oh Ji-ho, Yoon Sang-hyun, Lee Hye-young, Choi Cheol-ho, and Sunwoo Sun. It depicts the life of "naejo," housewives who devote their entire lives to their husbands' success, but with a more comedic and aggressive twist. It aired on MBC from March 16 to May 19, 2009 on Mondays and Tuesdays at 21:55 for 20 episodes.

The hit drama topped the ratings chart during its run, and created new trends among married women in terms of fashion and makeup. Actress Kim Nam-joo received numerous accolades for her acting comeback after an 8-year hiatus, and the series also served as the breakout vehicle of actor Yoon Sang-hyun.

== Plot ==
Chun Ji-ae (Kim Nam-joo) had it all... in high school. Pretty and popular, she was the school's queen bee, while awkward Yang Bong-soon (Lee Hye-young) was the exact opposite. The two were initially friends, until Ji-ae stole Bong-soon's crush, Han Joon-hyuk (Choi Cheol-ho). Fast-forward to middle-aged married life, and their roles have become reversed. Ji-ae struggles with household finances because she married Ohn Dal-soo (Oh Ji-ho), a once-promising university graduate turned unemployed pushover, while Joon-hyuk, whom Bong-soon married after Ji-ae dumped him, is now a successful executive.

Dal-soo finally gets a shot at a decent job at top company Queen's Food, where Joon-hyuk happens to be his new boss. Joon-hyuk still carries a torch for Ji-ae, and he makes it a point to make Dal-soo's internship as difficult and demeaning as possible. Meanwhile, determined to help her smart but clueless husband climb the corporate ladder, Ji-ae joins a social wives club to support him. The wives' power plays are directly correlative to their husbands' positions in the company (meaning, the higher-ranking the husband, the higher-ranking the wife), and Ji-ae sets aside her pride to curry favor and jockey for position. She immediately thrives within the wives' inner circle, but she's constantly thwarted by her ex-best friend, Bong-soon.

Then Dal-soo runs into his college friend Eun So-hyun (Sunwoo Sun), wife of Heo Tae-joon (Yoon Sang-hyun), the current president of Queen's Food. Stuck in a loveless marriage, So-hyun wants to have an affair with Dal-soo, while indolent chaebol Tae-joon gradually finds himself attracted to Ji-ae. The three couples interact in a confusing mix of romance, friendship, and workplace politics.

== Cast ==
=== Main characters ===
- Kim Nam-joo as Chun Ji-ae
- Oh Ji-ho as Oh Dal-soo
- Lee Hye-young as Yang Bong-soon
- Yoon Sang-hyun as Heo Tae-joon
- Choi Cheol-ho as Han Joon-hyuk
- Sunwoo Sun as Eun So-hyun
- Kim Chang-wan as Kim Hong-shik
- Na Young-hee as Jang Young-sook

=== Supporting characters ===
Ji-ae and Bong-soon's high school classmates

- Park Joo-hee as Go Mi-young
- Lee Seung-ah as Kim Young-sun
- Jung Soo-young as Ji Hwa-ja
- Kim Do-yeon as Ahn Jung-sook

Queen's Food husbands and wives

- Kim Yong-hee as Ha-chang
- Choi Ye-jin as Hwang-sook (Ha-chang's wife)
- Kim Jung-hak as Department chief Yang
- Hwang Hyo-eun as Lee Seul (chief Yang's wife)
- Hwang Jae-hee as Gong Young-min (HR manager's nephew)
- Joo Min-ha as Jung Go-woon (Young-min's wife, art gallery assistant)
- Lee Mae-ri as Jung-ran

Extended cast

- Kang Soo-han as Han Hyuk-chan (Bong-soon and Joon-hyuk's son)
- Kim Sung-kyum as President Heo (Tae-joon's father)
- Yu Ji-in as Tae-joon's mother
- Kim Young-ran as Ji-ae's mother
- Baek Seung-hee as Hyang-suk
- Kim Ik-tae as jeweller
- Min Joon-hyun as Ohn Dal-soo's co-worker
- Lee Seung-ho
- Kim Seung-woo as police officer (cameo, ep 3)
- Shindong as couple in sauna (cameo, ep 11)
- Kim Shin-young as couple in sauna (cameo, ep 11)
- Kim Sung-min as Tae-joon's friend (cameo, ep 16)
- Jun Jin as job applicant (cameo, ep 20)
- Yoo Jae-suk as job applicant (cameo, ep 20)
- Park Myung-soo as job applicant (cameo, ep 20)
- Jung Hyung-don as job applicant (cameo, ep 20)

== Ratings ==
Date	Episode	Nationwide	Seoul
2009-03-16	1	8.0%	8.7%
2009-03-17	2	10.3% (13th)	10.7% (13th)
2009-03-23	3	9.6% (15th)	10.1% (15th)
2009-03-24	4	11.2% (12th)	11.8% (12th)
2009-03-30	5	11.5% (11th)	11.8% (12th)
2009-03-31	6	12.0% (10th)	11.6% (10th)
2009-04-06	7	20.0% (2nd)	20.7% (2nd)
2008-04-07	8	21.3% (2nd)	22.0% (2nd)
2009-04-13	9	21.6% (2nd)	22.2% (2nd)
2009-04-14	10	24.1% (2nd)	25.6% (2nd)
2009-04-20	11	24.2% (2nd)	24.9% (2nd)
2009-04-21	12	24.4% (2nd)	25.6% (2nd)
2009-04-27	13	25.2% (2nd)	26.5% (2nd)
2009-04-28	14	27.4% (2nd)	29.3% (2nd)
2009-05-04	15	26.6% (1st)	28.4% (1st)
2009-05-05	16	29.2% (1st)	31.1% (1st)
2009-05-11	17	30.4% (1st)	32.2% (1st)
2009-05-12	18	30.0% (1st)	31.8% (1st)
2009-05-18	19	29.9% (1st)	31.7% (1st)
2009-05-19	20	31.7% (1st)	33.7% (1st)
Average		21.4%	22.5%

Source: TNS Media Korea

== Awards and nominations ==
Year	Award	Category	Recipient	Result
2009	Ministry of Culture, Sports and Tourism	Actress of the Year	Kim Nam-joo	Won
2009	MBC Drama Awards	Top Excellence Award, Actor	Yoon Sang-hyun	Won
2009	MBC Drama Awards	Top Excellence Award, Actress	Kim Nam-joo	Won
2009	MBC Drama Awards	Excellence Award, Actor	Choi Cheol-ho	Won
2009	MBC Drama Awards	Excellence Award, Actress	Lee Hye-young	Won
2009	MBC Drama Awards	Golden Acting Award, Actor	Kim Chang-wan	Won
2009	MBC Drama Awards	Golden Acting Award, Actress	Na Young-hee	Won
2009	MBC Drama Awards	Best New Actress	Sunwoo Sun	Nominated
2009	MBC Drama Awards	Best Writer	Park Ji-eun	Won
2010	Baeksang Arts Awards	Best Drama	Queen of Housewives	Nominated
2010	Baeksang Arts Awards	Best Director	Go Dong-sun	Won
2010	Baeksang Arts Awards	Best Actor	Yoon Sang-hyun	Nominated
2010	Baeksang Arts Awards	Best Actress	Kim Nam-joo	Won
2010	Baeksang Arts Awards	Best Screenplay	Park Ji-eun	Nominated
2010	CETV Awards	Grand Prize	Kim Nam-joo	Won
2010	CETV Awards	Top 10 Asian Stars	Kim Nam-joo	Won

== International broadcast ==
- Philippines: IBC, title "My Wife is a Superwoman"
