= Jeon Min-seo =

South Korean actress (born 2003)

- Born: May 20, 2003 (age 23); South Korea
- Occupation: Actress
- Years active: 2007–present

Korean name
- Hangul: 전민서
- Hanja: 殿民徐
- RR: Jeon Minseo
- MR: Chŏn Minsŏ

Jeon Min-seo (Korean: 전민서; born 20 May 2003) is a South Korean actress. She began her career as a child actress, notably in the television dramas Good Job, Good Job and Prime Minister & I.

== Filmography ==
=== Television series ===
Year	Title	Role
2007	Kimcheed Radish Cubes	young Baek Geum-hee
2008	General Hospital 2	Gong-joo
2009	Good Job, Good Job	Lee Byul
2009	Wife Returns	Yoon Da-eun
2010	Bad Guy	Hong So-dam
2010	Smile, Mom	young Shin Dal-rae
2010	Life Is Beautiful	Soo-na
2011	My Princess	young Lee Seol
2011	Gyebaek	young Eun-ko
2011	Saving Mrs. Go Bong-shil	Han-na
2012	Rooftop Prince	young Park Ha / young Hong Bu-yong
2012	Missing You	young Han Ah-reum
2013	All About My Romance	Song Bo-ri
2013	Prime Minister & I	Kwon Na-ra
2014	Two Mothers	Lee So-ra
2014	Tears of Heaven	young Yoon Cha-young
2016	Dr. Romantic	
2018	Grand Prince	Ahn Dan-bi
2018	Gangnam Beauty	young Kang Mi-rae

=== Film ===
Year	Title	Role
2007	Project Makeover	young Na Jung-ju
2008	Scandal Makers	Kim Mugung-hwa
2009	Fortune Salon	young Tae-rang
2011	War of the Arrows	young Choi Ja-in
2011	Pitch High	Yoon Yoo-ri
2013	Rockin' on Heaven's Door	Ha-eun

== Awards ==
Year	Award	Category	Nominated work	Result
2009	MBC Drama Awards	Best Young Actress	Good Job, Good Job	Won
