= Queen of Reversals =

South Korean television series

- Promotional poster
- Hangul: 역전의 여왕
- Hanja: 逆轉의 女王
- RR: Yeokjeonui yeowang
- MR: Yŏkchŏnŭi yŏwang
- Genre: Romance; Comedy
- Written by: Park Ji-eun
- Directed by: Kim Nam-won; Jung Dae-yoon
- Starring: Kim Nam-joo; Jung Joon-ho; Park Si-hoo; Chae Jung-an
- Country of origin: South Korea
- Original language: Korean
- No. of episodes: 31

Production
- Executive producer: Choi Yi-sup
- Producer: Kim Seung-mo

Original release
- Network: MBC TV
- Release: October 18, 2010 – February 1, 2011

Related
- Queen of Housewives

Queen of Reversals (Korean: 역전의 여왕; RR: Yeokjeonui yeowang) is a 2010 South Korean television series, starring Kim Nam-joo, Jung Joon-ho, Park Si-hoo and Chae Jung-an. It is about a career woman who experiences the many ups, downs, and reversals of work, family, and romance as she falls in and out of love and marriage. It aired on MBC from October 18, 2010 to February 1, 2011 on Mondays and Tuesdays at 21:55 for 31 episodes.

Lead actress Kim Nam-joo and writer Park Ji-eun previously worked together on the 2009 series Queen of Housewives.

== Plot ==
Hwang Tae-hee (Kim Nam-joo) leads a charmed life; after growing up in a wealthy family, she easily attains a coveted job. Ever the strong and decisive career woman, she is successful and beautiful, but lacks one important thing in her life: a man. Too much of a workaholic to make time for romance, she is taken aback when she falls hard for Bong Joon-soo (Jung Joon-ho). She loses no time in pursuing him and they soon get married, but when the honeymoon is over, Tae-hee finds that her rival at work and husband's ex, Baek Yeo-jin (Chae Jung-an), has taken over her job. Things aren't easy for Tae-hee as she juggles taking care of a daughter at home and leading a team at the same company as her husband and Yeo-jin. Misunderstandings grow over time between Tae-hee and Joon-soo, putting their marriage into jeopardy.

Meanwhile, Tae-hee's arrogant, immature chaebol boss Goo Yong-shik (Park Si-hoo), previously apathetic, grows more serious about his work with her guidance – and ends up falling hopelessly in love with her.

== Cast ==
- Kim Nam-joo as Hwang Tae-hee
- Jung Joon-ho as Bong Joon-soo
- Park Si-hoo as Goo Yong-shik
- Chae Jung-an as Baek Yeo-jin
- Ha Yoo-mi as Han Song-yi
- Choi Jung-woo as Goo Ho-seung
- Kim Hye-jung as Jang Sook-jung
- Kim Chang-wan as General Manager Mok Young-chul
- Kim Yong-hee as Section Chief Oh Dae-soo
- Im Ji-kyu as Kang-woo
- Yu Ji-in as Oh Mi-soon
- Park Jung-soo as Na Young-ja
- Kim Yong-gun as Tae-hee's father
- Shin Soo-yeon as So-ra, Tae-hee & Joon-soo's daughter
- Yoo Hye-ri as Yong-shik's biological mother
- Han Yeo-woon as Hwang Yeon-hee
- Kim Se-min as Yeon-hee's husband
- Han Kyu-hee as Joon-soo's father
- Lee Joo-na as Bong Mi-geum
- Lee Sun-young as Bong Soon-geum
- Oh Na-ra as Bong Hae-kum
- Ahn Sang-tae as Kang Dong-won
- Kang Rae-yeon as So Yoo-kyung
- Ga Deuk-hee as Bu Min-ah
- Choi Yoon-young as Ki-ppeum
- Oh Soo-min as Hyun-joo
- Ryu Je-hee as Han Song-yi's secretary
- Son Gun-woo as Team Leader Chu Sang-chul
- Yoo Tae-woong as Goo Yong-chul
- Jung Soo-young as Ji Hwa-ja (cameo, ep 5)
- Kim Seung-woo as security guard (cameo, ep 7)
- Lee Bong-won as (cameo)

== Ratings ==
In the table below, the blue numbers represent the lowest ratings and the red numbers represent the highest ratings.

Date	Episode	Nationwide	Seoul
2010-10-18	01	9.6% (12th)	10.2% (12th)
2010-10-19	02	8.4% (16th)	9.2% (15th)
2010-10-25	03	8.8% (15th)	10.0% (13th)
2010-10-26	04	9.0% (13th)	9.7% (12th)
2010-11-01	05	8.5% (16th)	9.6% (11th)
2010-11-02	06	9.6% (10th)	10.7% (10th)
2010-11-08	07	10.0% (12th)	11.2% (10th)
2010-11-09	08	10.4% (9th)	11.4% (8th)
2010-11-15	09	13.8% (5th)	14.9% (3rd)
2010-11-16	10	9.8% (9th)	10.4% (8th)
2010-11-22	11	9.2% (13th)	10.6% (9th)
2010-11-23	12	9.2% (11th)	9.7% (10th)
2010-11-29	13	9.2% (12th)	10.4% (9th)
2010-11-30	14	10.0% (8th)	11.0% (6th)
2010-12-06	15	9.2% (12th)	10.4% (8th)
2010-12-07	16	8.5% (14th)	9.5% (9th)
2010-12-13	17	11.8% (5th)	12.5% (5th)
2010-12-14	18	12.8% (6th)	14.0% (5th)
2010-12-20	19	13.3% (5th)	14.9% (4th)
2010-12-21	20	14.6% (5th)	15.7% (4th)
2010-12-27	21	11.1% (6th)	12.0% (5th)
2010-12-28	22	14.6% (5th)	15.7% (4th)
2011-01-03	23	11.0% (9th)	14.9% (4th)
2011-01-04	24	11.9% (7th)	14.8% (5th)
2011-01-10	25	12.1% (6th)	17.0% (3rd)
2011-01-11	26	12.8% (7th)	16.8% (3rd)
2011-01-17	27	11.9% (8th)	15.2% (4th)
2011-01-24	28	11.1% (9th)	13.8% (4th)
2011-01-25	29	10.0% (12th)	11.6% (7th)
2011-01-31	30	11.0% (11th)	13.6% (5th)
2011-02-01	31	11.4% (9th)	13.4% (5th)
Average		10.8%	12.1%

Source: TNS Media Korea

== International broadcast ==
- It aired in Japan on Fuji TV at the same time as another of Park Si-hoo's dramas, Prosecutor Princess.
- It aired in Panama on Sertv as "La Reina de los Reveses".
- It aired in Vietnam on VTV6 as "Nữ hoàng rắc rối", beginning from September 24, 2012.
