= Lee Hye-young (actress, born 1971) =

South Korean actress (born 1971)

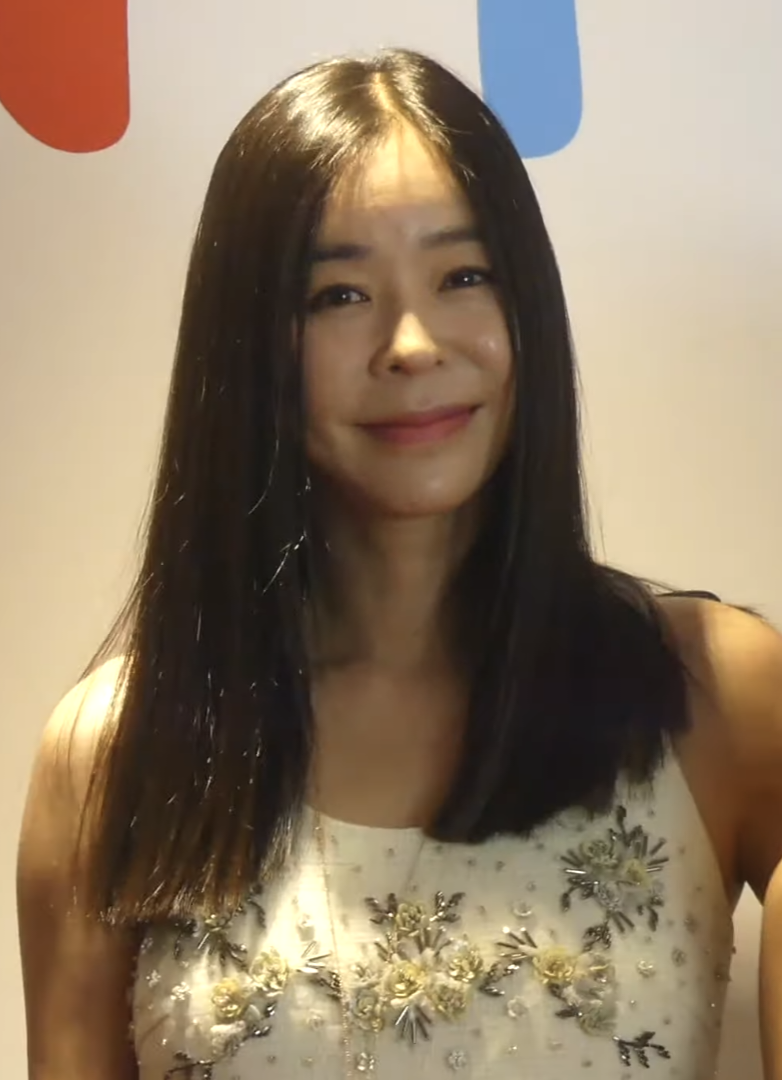
- Lee in June 2019
- Born: December 22, 1971 (age 54); Incheon, South Korea
- Education: Incheon City College - Business Administration
- Occupations: Actress; singer; businesswoman
- Years active: 1992–present
- Spouses: Lee Sang-min (m. 2004; div. 2005) Unknown (m. 2011)

Korean name
- Hangul: 이혜영
- RR: I Hyeyeong
- MR: I Hyeyŏng

Lee Hye-young (Korean: 이혜영; born December 22, 1971) is a South Korean actress, singer and businesswoman. As a singer in the 1990s, Lee released two dance music albums each with 1730 and Coco, and one album as a solo artist. When she switched to acting, Lee starred in television series such as Premonition (1997), Dal-ja's Spring (2007) and Queen of Housewives (2009), and also founded the fashion brand Miss Dorothy.

== Career ==
Lee Hye-young made her entertainment debut as a singer performing dance music. In 1992, she became part of the three-member K-pop group 1730 alongside Kim Joo-hoon and Hwang Ho-young; 1730 released two albums then disbanded. Lee and Yoon Hyun-sook (from another defunct group ZAM) then formed the duo Coco in 1994, which also released two albums. Following two soundtrack contributions, she released her first album as a solo artist, Her First Sense in 2000, and a Christmas single in 2008.

Lee began acting in 1995, and went on to star in television dramas such as First Love (1996), Premonition (1997), Can't Help Being Born Well (2001), Dal-ja's Spring (2007) and Kimchi Cheese Smile (2008), as well as the films If (2000) and How the Lack of Love Affects Two Men (2006). Lee notably drew praise in the role of a high school geek-turned-glamorous leader of an elite clique of corporate spouses in ratings hit Queen of Housewives, for which she won an Excellence Award at the 2009 MBC Drama Awards.

Lee soon built a reputation for being one of trendiest and most fashionable Korean celebrities (pre-stardom, she previously worked as a stylist for the band Chakra). She parlayed this to another successful career when she launched the clothing and accessories brand Miss Dorothy in 2004. Sold through the CJ home shopping TV channel and online shopping mall MD Story-net, Miss Dorothy recorded high sales of ₩15 billion in its first year and ₩40 billion by its third year in operation, making it the best-selling fashion brand owned by a Korean celebrity for eight consecutive years. More than just a model and endorser for Miss Dorothy, as CEO Lee oversaw the brand's product design and development, marketing and promotion; she also became a director for lingerie company M Corset when it merged with Miss Dorothy in 2007. Once she entered her forties, Lee felt that her age would be incompatible with Miss Dorothy's target demographic of women in their twenties and thirties, so she left the company and sold her shares in 2012, then donated all the proceeds to charity.

Lee also wrote the books The Beauty Bible and The Fashion Bible in 2009, and hosted fashion-focused talk shows on cable, such as Style Magazine (2008–2009) and Women& (2012).

In 2017, Lee announced the official opening of her art gallery in New York with a total of 21 paintings on display.

== Personal life ==
Lee dated Roo'ra singer and music producer Lee Sang-min for eight years before the couple married in 2004. They divorced in 2005, after one year and two months. She remarried on July 19, 2011 in Hawaii to a banker/mergers and acquisitions expert.

== Philanthropy ==
On March 6, 2022, Lee donated 10 million won to the Hope Bridge Disaster Relief Association to help the victims of the massive wildfire that started in Uljin, Gyeongbuk and has spread to Samcheok, Gangwon.

On February 9, 2023, Lee donated 10 million won to help 2023 Turkey–Syria earthquake through Hope Bridge National Disaster Relief Association.

On May 16, Lee was named a member of the Hope Bridge Honors Club, a club of high-dollar donors.

== Filmography ==
=== Television series ===
Year	Title	Role	Network
1995	Sons of the Wind		KBS2
1996	Papa	Yoon Hye-won	KBS2
1996	Drama Game: "Sunglasses 1004"		KBS2
1996	Reporting for Duty	Go Eun-shil	KBS2
1996	First Love	Park Shin-ja	KBS2
1997	Today Somehow		KBS2
1997	Premonition	Yoo-rim	MBC
1998	Heart of Lies	Lee Soo-ji	MBC
1999	Sunday Best: "Do You Know You're a Parent"		KBS2
1999	The Boss	"Crow"	MBC
1999	Goodbye My Love	Im Jung-ae	MBC
1999	Woman on Top	Lee Hye-nam	SBS
2001	Can't Help Being Born Well		KBS2
2003	Detective	Lee Hye-young	SBS
2004	Save the Last Dance for Me	Kang Hyun-jung	SBS
2007	Dal-ja's Spring	Wee Seon-joo	KBS2
2007	Kimchi Cheese Smile	Shin Hye-young	MBC
2009	Queen of Housewives	Yang Bong-soon	MBC
2012	My Husband Got a Family	Top drama actress (cameo, episode 40)	KBS2

=== Film ===
Year	Title	Role
1995	The Man Wagging Tail	Kyung-ah
1997	Father vs. Son	Kim Mi-jung
2000	If	Park Ha-young
2002	Bet on My Disco	Ae-ran
2006	How the Lack of Love Affects Two Men	Oh Mi-mi

=== Television show ===
Year	Title	Notes/Ref.
1994	TV Music 20	Host
2004–2005	Changing U	Host
2005–2006	Heroine 6	Cast member
2008–2009	Style Magazine	Host
	Talk & City	
2012	Women& with Lee Hye-young	Host
2012	Reckless Family	Cast member
2018	Let's Eat Dinner Together	Cast member
2021	Divorced Singles	Host
2021	Divorced Singles 2	Host
2022	Doll Singles 3	Host

== Discography ==
Album information	Track listing
Oh I Love You: Album; Artist: Lee Hye-young; Released: May 29, 1986; Label: DAS	Track listing: 1. 오 사랑합니다; 2. 그늘에 핀 동백꽃; 3. 두견새야; 4. 오신다더니; 5. 삼다도소식; 6. 내곁에 있어주; 7. 애향; 8. 헤어지지 말아요; 9. 사랑의 길 10. 그대 변치 않는다면; 11. 개나리처녀; 12. 한국의 호랑이 (건전가요)
1730: Album; Artist: 1730; Released: 1992; Label: Samsung Music	Track listing: 1. Signal 1730; 2. 1730년 서곡 (Instrumental); 3. 나의 마음 (Edited Remix); 4. 친구였지만 (Funny Mix); 5. Can't Find It (English Version of 찾을수 없어); 6. 잊을 수 없는 이유; 7. 한남동 길가에서 (Instrumental); 8. 그저 널 바라 본 것 뿐 9. 친구였지만 (Piano Version); 10. 찾을 수 없어; 11. 나의 마음; 12. 아름다운 이별; 13. Inventionen 1730 (Instrumental)
Co Co: Album; Artist: Coco; Released: 1993; Label: Samsung Music	Track listing: 1. 그리움으로 지는 너 2. 영원히 널 3. 어긋난 선택; 4. 슬픈 추억으로; 5. 너와 닮은 나 6. 그저 친구일뿐; 7. 너 그대로의 모습으로; 8. 아침없는 하루
Souls from Cosmo: Album; Artist: 1730; Released: 1994; Label: Orange	Track listing: 1. 새로움; 2. 그렇게 될까?; 3. 서로 다른 곳에서; 4. 착각하지마; 5. 고난주간; 6. 아무도 날 도와주지 않아; 7. 너보다 더한 아픔으로; 8. 널 만나는 날 9. 그저 널 바라본것 뿐...그 1년후; 10. Who's Who? (Come To The Party)
Co Co Vol. 2: Album; Artist: Coco; Released: 1994; Label: Daeyoung AV	Track listing: 1. 그 느낌속의 너 2. 요즘 우리는; 3. 너와 닮은 나 4. 사랑했던 널 5. 남은 시간들; 6. 표현; 7. 너와 닮은 나 (MR); 8. 사랑했던 널 (MR)
Not Alone in Love: 1 track from The Man Wagging Tail OST; Artist: Lee Hye-young; Released: September 1, 1995; Label: SKC	Track listing: 4. 사랑은 혼자가 아닐때 (Not Alone in Love)
Dreaming of a Happier Time: 1 track from Reporting for Duty OST; Artist: Lee Hye-young; Released: July 1996; Label: KBS Cultural Corps, LGM	Track listing: 2. 행복했던 시간을 꿈꾸며 (Dreaming of a Happier Time)
Her First Sense: Album; Artist: Lee Hye-young; Released: August 28, 2000; Label: CREAM	Track listing: 1. Intro (First Sense); 2. La Dolce Vita; 3. Beginning; 4. Variety; 5. 첫사랑; 6. 다가와 (Come To Me); 7. 미워 미워; 8. 행복해; 9. Sahara; 10. Refresh; 11. La Dolce Vita (Club Mix)
Sweet Christmas: Single; Artist: Lee Hye-young; Released: December 9, 2008; Label: Mega Entertainment, Show Record	Track listing: 1. 실버벨 (Silver Bells); 2. Silver Bells (Carol Ver.)

== Bibliography ==
Year	Title	Publisher	ISBN
2009	The Beauty Bible	Sallim Life	ISBN 9788952210951
2009	The Fashion Bible	Sallim Life	ISBN 9788952212665

== Awards and nominations ==
Year	Award	Category	Nominated work	Result
1997	33rd Baeksang Arts Awards	Best New Actress (TV)	First Love	Won
1997	MBC Drama Awards	Popularity Award	Premonition	Won
2007	KBS Drama Awards	Best Supporting Actress	Dal-ja's Spring	Nominated
2009	MBC Drama Awards	Excellence Award, Actress	Queen of Housewives	Won
