= Misty (TV series) =

2018 South Korean television series

- Promotional poster
- Hangul: 미스티
- RR: Miseuti
- MR: Misŭt'i
- Genre: Melodrama; Mystery; Thriller; Romance
- Created by: JTBC; Plot Line
- Written by: Jae In (Jane Jae-in Kim)
- Directed by: Mo Wan-il
- Creative directors: Yoo Jae-kyoo (Lighting); Won Ji-hwan (Art); Jang Han-seung (Martial arts); Gaemi (Music); Kang Eun-kyung (Script)
- Starring: Kim Nam-joo; Ji Jin-hee
- Composer: Go Sung-pil's Music Score (고성필스코어뮤직)
- Country of origin: South Korea
- Original language: Korean
- No. of episodes: 16

Production
- Executive producers: Hahm Young-hoon; Hwang Jee-woo; Oh Hwan-min
- Producers: Kim Bo-kyung; Park Woo-ram
- Production locations: South Korea; Thailand
- Cinematography: Jang Jong-kyung
- Editor: Han Ji-woo
- Camera setup: Single camera
- Running time: 70 minutes
- Production company: Story & Pictures Media

Original release
- Network: JTBC
- Release: February 2 – March 24, 2018

Misty (Korean: 미스티) is a 2018 South Korean television series starring Kim Nam-joo and Ji Jin-hee. The series marks Kim Nam-joo's small screen comeback after six years. It aired on JTBC from February 2 to March 24, 2018, every Friday and Saturday at 23:00 (KST).

== Synopsis ==
Go Hye-ran (Kim Nam-joo) becomes the prime suspect in a murder case. Her husband Kang Tae-wook (Ji Jin-hee) ends up being her legal counsel despite their marriage being on the rocks after she aborted their unborn child and value career over family.

== Cast ==
=== Main ===
- Kim Nam-joo as Go Hye-ran, a skilled and popular anchorwoman.
  - Park Shi-woo as young Go Hye-ran
- Ji Jin-hee as Kang Tae-wook, a former prosecutor now working as a public defender.
- Jeon Hye-jin as Seo Eun-joo, Kevin Lee's wife and Hye-ran's friend from school.
- Im Tae-kyung as Ha Myung-woo, a prisoner.
  - Seo Ji-hoon as young Ha Myung-woo
- Ko Jun as Lee Jae-yeong / Kevin Lee, a pro-golfer and Seo Eun-joo's husband.
- Jin Ki-joo as Han Ji-won, junior anchorwoman and Hye-ran's rival.
- Ahn Nae-sang as Kang Ki-joon, a detective.

=== Supporting ===
==== People at JBC ====
- Lee Geung-young as Jang Gyu-seok, JBC news director.
- Lee Sung-wook as Oh Dae-woong
- Koo Ja-sung as Kwak Gi-seok, a junior reporter.
- Lee Ah-hyun as Lee Yun-jung

==== Extended ====
- Kim Hyung-jong as Prosecutor Byun Woo-hyun
- Lee Jun-hyeok as Jung Ki-chan
- Kim Soo-jin as Yoon Song-yi, Hye-ran's best friend and magazine reporter.
- Kang Deuk-jong as Choi Ki-seop
- Shin Kang-woo as Park Sung-jae
- Jun Kook-hwan as Tae-wook's father
- Kim Bo-yeon as Tae-wook's mother
- Yeon Woon-kyung as Lee Young-shil, Hye-ran's mother.
- Jung Young-ki as Baek Dong-hyun, Kevin Lee's manager.
- Kim Bum-soo as Kim Bum-soo, winner of journalist of the year award.
- Kwak In-joon as Han Ki-hoon
- Lee Sang-yi
- Myung Ji-yun
- Goo Bon-seok
- Son Kwang-eop as Senior Go
- Yang Dae-hyuk as Floor Director
- Jo Jae-wan
- Yang Hee-myung
- Seo Byung-deok
- Lee Do-hyun
- Lee Tae-hyun
- Oh Joo-hwan
- Lee Do-yoon
- Jo Soo-hyuk
- Go Man-kyoo
- Kim Kwang-tae
- Yoon Bong-kil as Kyoo Do-kwan
- Kim Jung-hak
- Ha Eun
- Kim Hyung-mook as Yoon Ho-young
- Jun Eun-hye
- Lee Joo-seok
- Yang Young-jo
- Maeng Bong-hak
- Lee Kyoo-seop
- Nam Kyung-eup as Kang In-han
- Kim Myung-gon as Jung Dae-han
- Han Ki-joong
- Choi Bum-ho
- Lee Tae-ho
- Jin Hyun-kwang
- Choi Il-joon
- Hwang In-joon
- Min Dae-shik
- Kang Chan-yang
- Han Joong-ki
- Choi Seung-il
- Jun Jin-ki
- Shin Sun-hee
- Park Hun-rak
- Park So-yeon
- Jung Myung-joon
- Kim Joon-hee
- Hae Sun
- Lee Se-wook
- Kang Choong-hoon
- Jin Soo-nam
- Yook Hyo-myung
- Oh Seung-chan
- Son In-yong
- Kang Hoo-jae
- Song Hyun-jin
- Sun Hyun-jin
- Sun Ah-rin
- Lim Jung-min
- Lee Jin-seung
- Jung Hyun-woo
- Lee Kwan-young
- Lim Yong-soon
- Kang Chul-sung
- Kim Wang-do

=== Special appearances ===
- Han Suk-joon
- Lee Geum-hee
- Song Min-gyo
- Choo Ja-hyun

== Production ==
- The series marks musical actor Im Tae-kyung small screen debut.
- The first script reading of the cast was held in October 2017 at JTBC building in Sangam-dong.
- Filming started in South Korea in October 2017. The staff and main actors then departed for Thailand in November for one week filming.
- Misty was rated 19 for the first 4 episodes by the Korea Communications Commission due to violence and sexual content. However, the rating was changed to rated 15 starting on episode 5.

== Original soundtrack ==
Misty OST

Soundtrack album by Various artists
- Released: March 24, 2018
- Genre: Soundtrack
- Length: 42:15
- Languages: Korean, English, Italian
- Labels: OU Entertainment; NHN Bugs Corp.

=== Part 1 ===
Released on February 17, 2018
No.	Title	Lyrics	Music	Artist	Length
1.	"사랑은 아프다" (Painful Love)	Lee Seung-chul	Gaemi (개미), Kim Se-jin	Lee Seung-chul	4:07

=== Part 2 ===
Released on February 23, 2018
No.	Title	Lyrics	Music	Artist	Length
1.	"Knockin' on Heaven's Door"			KLANG	3:12
2.	"Don't Cry"	Jamon Maple	Gaemi (개미)	KLANG	3:31
Total length:					6:43

=== Part 3 ===
Released on March 2, 2018
No.	Title	Lyrics	Music	Artist	Length
1.	"Someday"	Gaemi (개미)	Gaemi (개미)	Lee Seung-chul	4:00

=== Part 4 ===
Released on March 10, 2018
No.	Title	Lyrics	Music	Artist	Length
1.	"영원" (Forever)	Lee Jung-hyun	Gaemi (개미)	Min Young-ki	3:38

=== Part 5 ===
Released on March 17, 2018
No.	Title	Lyrics	Music	Artist	Length
1.	"그 길에" (On The Way)	Hana	Tom and Jerry (톰이랑 제리), Jin Min-ho	Lim Han-byul	4:15

=== Special OST ===
Released on March 24, 2018
No.	Title	Lyrics	Music	Artist	Length
1.	"사랑은 아프다" (Painful Love)	Lee Seung-chul	Gaemi (개미), Kim Se-jin	Lee Seung-chul	4:07
2.	"Knockin' on Heaven's Door"			KLANG	3:12
3.	"Don't Cry"	Jamon Maple	Gaemi	KLANG	3:31
4.	"Someday"	Gaemi	Gaemi	Lee Seung-chul	4:00
5.	"영원" (Forever)	Lee Jung-hyun	Gaemi	Min Young-ki	3:38
6.	"그 길에" (On The Way)	Hana	Tom and Jerry (톰이랑 제리), Jin Min-ho	Lim Han-byul	4:15
7.	"Misty"		Gaemi, Lee Geon-young		3:05
8.	"There Were None"		Park Mi-seon		3:00
9.	"Blind Love"		Klozer		2:45
10.	"Run"		Park Jung-hwan		2:00
11.	"Dangerous Affair"		Jo Yoon-jung		2:07
12.	"Desire"		Park Mi-seon		2:46
13.	"Glass Ceiling"		Gaemi		1:48
14.	"Return"		Lee Sung-goo		2:57
15.	"Provoke"		Gaemi, Lee Geon-young		3:19
16.	"Stress"		Jo Yoon-jung		2:01
17.	"Behind"		Lee Geon-young		3:49
18.	"Don't Be Crying"		Lee Geon-young		3:28
19.	"Memorize"		Gaemi		3:45
20.	"Naraka"		Park Yoon-seo		2:43
21.	"Counterattack"		Park Jung-hwan		2:31
Total length:					42:15

== Viewership ==
Misty : South Korea viewers per episode (millions)

Season	Episode number																Average
Season	1	2	3	4	5	6	7	8	9	10	11	12	13	14	15	16	Average
1	0.725	1.101	0.761	1.029	1.116	1.510	1.248	1.322	1.402	1.720	1.317	1.428	1.391	1.820	1.356	1.715	1.310

Source: Audience measurement performed nationwide by Nielsen Korea.

Average TV viewership ratings
Ep.	Original broadcast date	Title	Average audience share		
Ep.	Original broadcast date	Title	Nielsen Korea		TNmS
Ep.	Original broadcast date	Title	Nationwide	Seoul	Nationwide
1	February 2, 2018	Fracture (균열)	3.473% (6th)	3.513% (4th)	3.7%
2	February 3, 2018	Provoke (도발)	5.074% (1st)	5.599% (1st)	4.4%
3	February 9, 2018	Duality (이면)	3.885% (1st)	4.003% (1st)	3.2%
4	February 10, 2018	Bottomless Pit (나락)	4.789% (2nd)	5.342% (1st)	4.1%
5	February 16, 2018	Scandal (추문)	5.390% (2nd)	5.960% (1st)	4.7%
6	February 17, 2018	Variable (변수)	7.081% (1st)	7.832% (1st)	5.9%
7	February 23, 2018	Secret (비밀)	5.965% (1st)	6.356% (1st)	6.5%
8	February 24, 2018	Convict (단죄)	6.324% (1st)	7.141% (1st)	4.7%
9	March 2, 2018	Isolation (고립)	6.908% (1st)	6.870% (1st)	6.0%
10	March 3, 2018	Threat (위협)	7.693% (1st)	8.465% (1st)	7.8%
11	March 9, 2018	Confession (고백)	6.658% (1st)	7.352% (2nd)	5.6%
12	March 10, 2018	New Trial (복심)	6.868% (2nd)	6.926% (1st)	7.0%
13	March 16, 2018	Perjury (위증)	7.467% (1st)	7.821% (1st)	6.4%
14	March 17, 2018	Truth (진실)	8.058% (1st)	8.266% (1st)	7.4%
15	March 23, 2018	Desperately Hoping (무망)	7.266% (1st)	7.713% (1st)	6.6%
16	March 24, 2018	Smoke and Fog (연무)	8.452% (1st)	8.938% (1st)	7.9%
Average			6.334%	6.756%	5.7%
In the table above, the blue numbers represent the lowest ratings and the red numbers represent the highest ratings.; This series aired on a cable channel/pay TV which normally has a relatively smaller audience compared to free-to-air TV/public broadcasters (KBS, SBS, MBC and EBS).

== Awards and nominations ==
Year	Award	Category	Recipient(s)	Result	Ref.
2018	54th Baeksang Arts Awards	Best Drama	Misty	Nominated	
2018	54th Baeksang Arts Awards	Best Director	Mo Wan-il	Nominated	
2018	54th Baeksang Arts Awards	Best Actress	Kim Nam-joo	Won	
2018	54th Baeksang Arts Awards	Best Supporting Actress	Jeon Hye-jin	Nominated	
2018	6th APAN Star Awards	Grand Prize (Daesang)	Kim Nam-joo	Nominated	
2018	6th APAN Star Awards	Best New Actress	Jin Ki-joo	Nominated	
2018	2nd The Seoul Awards	Best Actress	Kim Nam-joo	Won	
2019	23rd Asian Television Awards	Best Direction (Fiction)	Mo Wan-il	Nominated	
2019	23rd Asian Television Awards	Best Actress in a Leading Role	Kim Nam-joo	Won	
