= Kim Yong-hee (actor) =

South Korean actor

- Born: 1973 (age 52–53); South Korea
- Occupation: Actor

Korean name
- Hangul: 김용희
- RR: Gim Yonghui
- MR: Kim Yonghŭi

Kim Yong-hee (born 1973) is a South Korean actor.

== Filmography ==
=== Television series ===
Year	Title	Role	Network
1998	Advocate		MBC
2000	Say It with Your Eyes		MBC
2001	Delicious Proposal		MBC
2001	Hotelier		MBC
2002	I Love You, Hyun-jung		MBC
2004	Star's Echo	Min-suk	MBC
2005	5th Republic		MBC
2005	Sweet Spy	Director Park	MBC
2005	Pharmacist Kim's Daughters		MBC
2006	Jumong	Seol-tak	MBC
2006	Korea Secret Agency	Lee Poong-joo	SBS
2007	Merry Mary		MBC
2007	Air City		MBC
2008	Don't Be Swayed	Lee Soo-hyun's hired gangster	MBC
2009	Queen of Housewives	Ha-chang	MBC
2010	The Woman Who Still Wants to Marry	Choi Myung-suk	MBC
2010	Queen of Reversals	Section Chief Oh Dae-soo	MBC
2011	The Duo	Im Po-jol	MBC
2011	Insu, the Queen Mother	Kwon Ram	jTBC
2012	My Husband Got a Family	Cha Se-joong	KBS2
2013	A Little Love Never Hurts	Sang-hyuk	MBC
2013	Your Neighbor's Wife	Doctor Yoon	jTBC
2014	Cunning Single Lady	Na Soo-cheol	MBC
2015	This is My Love	Lee Hyun-bal	jTBC
2018	Sketch	Jung Il-woo	jTBC
2019	Diary of a Prosecutor	Chief Nam	jTBC
2020	Good Casting	Ok Chul	SBS TV

=== Film ===
Year	Title	Role
2001	Indian Summer	Lawyer Choi
