= Chae Jung-an =

South Korean actress and singer (born 1977)

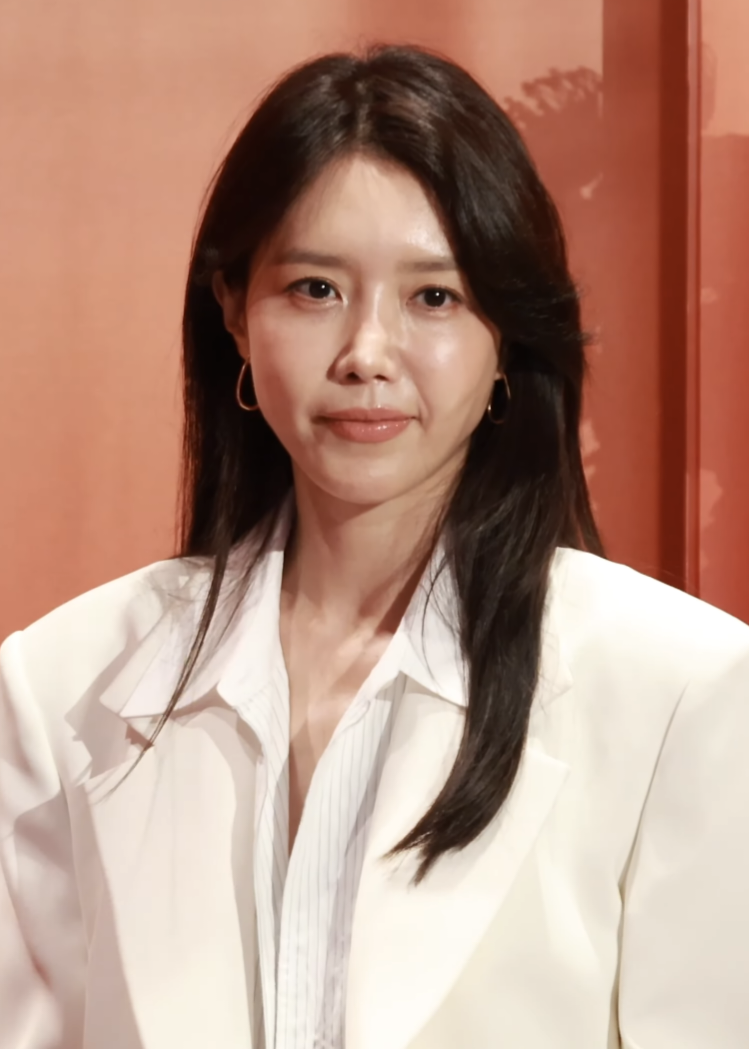
- Chae in September 2025
- Born: Jang Jung-an; October 21, 1977 (age 49); Pusan, South Korea
- Education: Dongguk University – Theater and Film
- Occupations: Actress; singer
- Years active: 1995–present
- Agents: ESteem Entertainment; KeyEast

Korean name
- Hangul: 장정안
- RR: Jang Jeongan
- MR: Chang Chŏngan

Stage name
- Hangul: 채정안
- RR: Chae Jeongan
- MR: Ch'ae Chŏngan

Chae Jung-an (born Jang Jung-an on October 21, 1977) is a South Korean actress and singer.

== Philanthropy ==
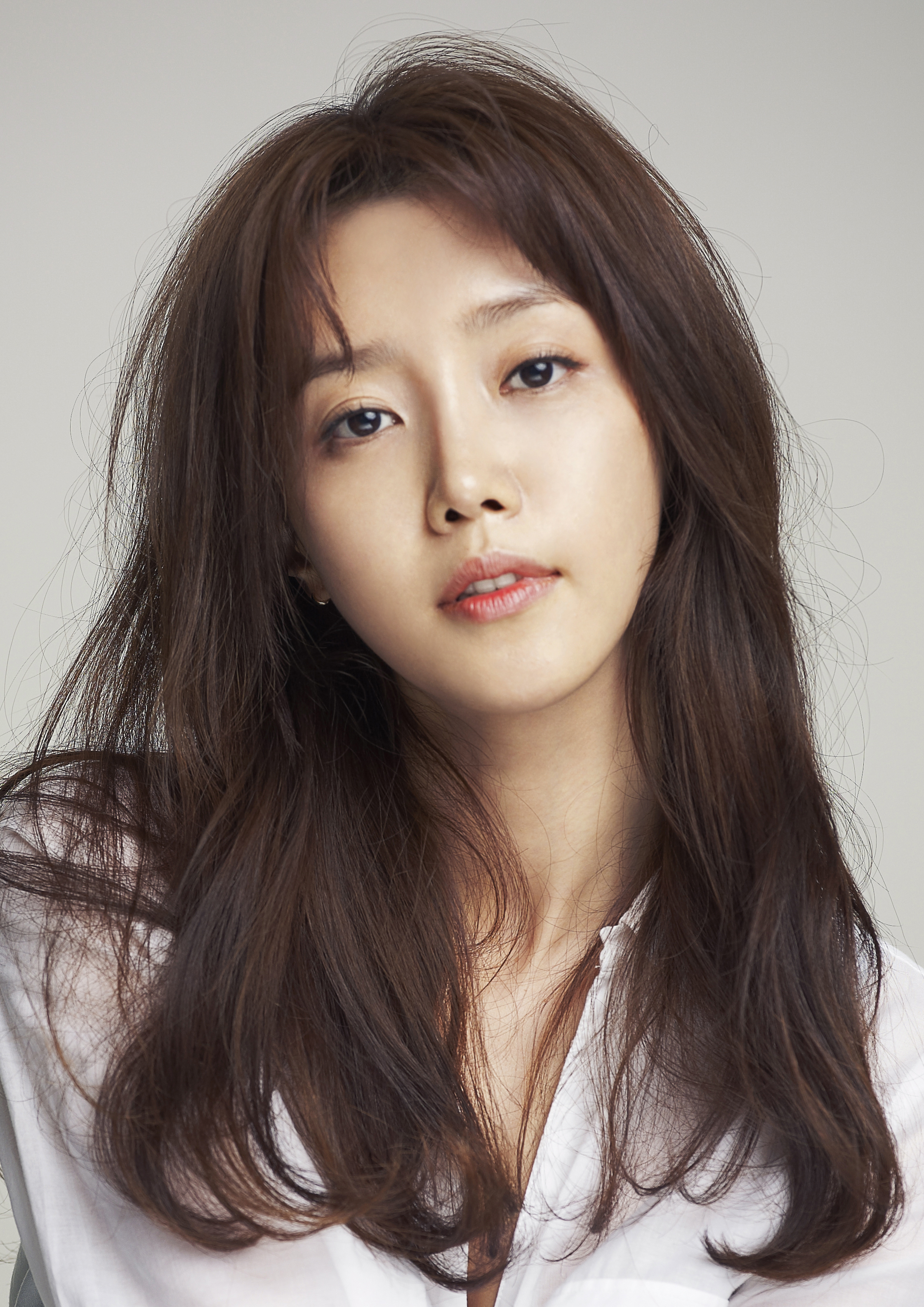
Chae in 2014

On March 11, 2022, Chae made a donation of ₩30 million to the Hope Bridge Disaster Relief Association to help the victims of the massive wildfire that started in Uljin, Gyeongbuk and has spread to Samcheok, Gangwon.

In May 2022, Chae donated ₩60 million to the Green Umbrella Children's Foundation with 'Genetic', a beauty brand specializing in aesthetics.

== Filmography ==
=== Film ===
Year	Title	Role	Notes	Ref.
1998	The Happenings			
2003	Run to You	Kyung-ah		
2005	Long and Winding Rode	Eun-young		
2008	Hello, Schoolgirl	Kwon Ha-kyung		
2014	Dad for Rent	Mi-yeon		
2016	Two Rooms, Two Nights	Yoon-joo		

=== Television series ===
Year	Title	Role	Notes	Ref.
1996	Three Guys and Three Girls	Chae Jung-an		
1998	Panther of Kilimanjaro	Ma-ri		
1998	Crush	Ji-young		
1998	Paper Crane	Jung Yeo-ok		
2000	Snowflakes	Seo Ji-ho		
2001	Mina	Kim Soo-ryun / Park Mi-na		
2003	Over the Green Fields	Sung Soon-ho		
2003	Run	Kang Hee-ya		
2004	MBC Best Theater: "The Train that Goes to Gomsk"	Yeo-ja		
2004	Emperor of the Sea	Lady Chae-ryung		
2007	Coffee Prince	Han Yoo-joo		
2009	Cain and Abel	Kim Seo-yeon		
2009	Hot Blood	Kim Jae-hee		
2010	Queen of Reversals	Baek Yeo-jin		
2013	When a Man Falls in Love	Baek Sung-joo		
2013	KBS Drama Special: "Your Noir"	Jin Yi-hyun		
2013	Prime Minister & I	Seo Hye-joo		
2014	A New Leaf	Yoo Jung-sun		
2015	Yong-pal	Lee Chae-young		
2015	Ex-Girlfriends' Club	Baek Song-yi	Episode 1	
2016	Entertainer	Yeo Min-joo		
2017	Man to Man	Song Mi-eun		
2018	Suits	Hong Ha-dam		
2019	Legal High	Min Joo-kyung		
2021	Monthly Magazine Home	Yeo Eui-joo		
2023	Family: The Unbreakable Bond	Oh Chun-ryeon		

=== Web series ===
Year	Title	Role	Ref.
2022	The King of Pigs	Kang Jin-ah	

=== Television shows ===
Year	Title	Role	Notes	Ref.
2023	Myeongdong Love Room	Manager		
2023	Empty Nesters - Suri Suri Village Suri	Host	Season 3	
2025	Nae Muttaero	Herself / panelist		

== Discography ==
=== Studio albums ===
List of studio albums, with selected details, chart positions, and sales
Title	Album details	Peak chart positions	Sales
Title	Album details	KOR	Sales
Heartless	Released: July 16, 1999; Label: Kakao Entertainment; Formats: CD, cassette; Track listing: 1. "Dalsooki"; 2. "Heartless" [무정(無情)] (feat. Steve Chae); 3. "Some Nostalgia" (어떤 그리움); 4. "No" (안돼); 5. "Innocent" [무죄(無罪)]; 6. "A Love Story" (사랑 이야기); 7. "The Last Chance" (마지막 기회); 8. "I.D: Love"; 9. "Love Later" (후애); 10. "Freedom" (자유); 11. "Heartless" [무정(無情)] (New Wave Version); 12. "Heartless" [무정(無情)] (Instrumental) [Techno Version]; 13. "Heartless" [무정(無情)] (New Wave Version) [Instrumental]	—	—N/a
Letter	Released: May 8, 2000; Label: Cream Records; Formats: CD, cassette; Track listing: 1. "Intro"; 2. "Shadow"; 3. "Letter" (편지); 4. "Tess"; 5. "Middletro"; 6. "Stay"; 7. "Azalea Flowers" (진달래); 8. "Temptation"; 9. "Foolish Smile" (바보같은 미소); 10. "I Wished You Could" (그러길 바랬어); 11. "My Love"; 12. "White"; 13. "Outro"	—	—N/a
Goddess... Her Fate	Released: October 18, 2001; Label: Danal Entertainment; Formats: CD, cassette; Track listing: 1. "I Say"; 2. "Magic"; 3. "No" (아니야); 4. "Precious Love" (귀한 사랑); 5. "Parting For You" (널 위한 이별); 6. "Tonight"; 7. "I Don't Know" (몰라); 8. "Warning"; 9. "Prism"; 10. "Why?!" (왜!?); 11. "But Beautiful"; 12. "Love That Looks Stupid" (바보같은 사랑); 13. "Only You!" (너만!); 14. "Magic" (Remix)	—	—N/a
"—" denotes releases that did not chart or were not released in that region.

=== Soundtrack appearances ===
List of soundtrack appearances, with year, and album
Title	Year	Album
"The Easiest Thing for Me" (내게 가장 쉬운일)	2009	Cain and Abel OST
"What's Left" (남은 것은)	2022	I Have Not Done My Best Yet OST, Pt. 2

== Awards and nominations ==
Name of the award ceremony, year presented, category, nominee of the award, and the result of the nomination
Award ceremony	Year	Category	Nominee / Work	Result	Ref.
APAN Star Awards	2015	Best Supporting Actress	Yong-pal	Won	
Johnson & Johnson Clean Face Contest	1995	Grand Prize	Chae Jung-an	Won	
Korea Drama Awards	2018	Excellence Award, Actress	Suits	Won	
MBC Drama Awards	2007	Best Couple Award	Chae Jung-an (with Lee Sun-kyun); Coffee Prince	Nominated	
MBC Drama Awards	2007	Excellence Award, Actress	Coffee Prince	Nominated	
MBC Drama Awards	2010	PD Award	Queen of Reversals	Won	
SBS Drama Awards	2016	Excellence Award, Actress in a Romantic-Comedy Drama	Entertainer	Nominated	
Seoul Music Awards	1999	New Artist Award	Heartless	Won	
