= 1st K-Drama Star Awards =

2012 edition of award ceremony

- Date: December 8, 2012
- Site: Daejeon Convention Center, Daejeon

The 1st K-Drama Star Awards (Korean: 케이 드라마 스타 어워즈) was an awards ceremony for excellence in television in South Korea. (Note: The K-Drama Star Awards was renamed to APAN Star Awards a year later, in 2013.) It was held at the Daejeon Convention Center in Daejeon on December 8, 2012. The nominees were chosen from Korean dramas that aired from October 1, 2011 to October 31, 2012.

The highest honor of the ceremony, Grand Prize (Daesang), was awarded to the actor Son Hyun-joo of the drama series The Chaser.

== Nominations and winners ==
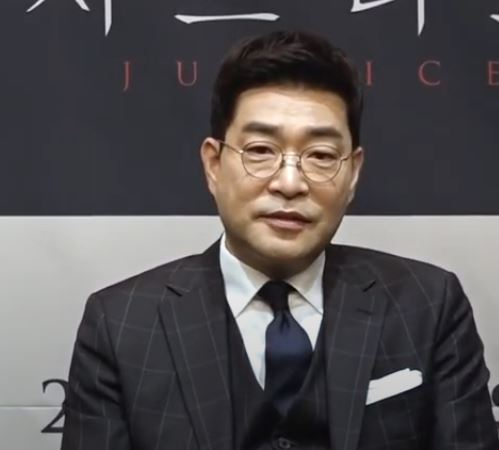
Son Hyun-joo — Grand Prize (Daesang) winner for The Chaser

Winners are listed first, highlighted in boldface, and indicated with a dagger (†).

**Grand Prize (Daesang)**: **Son Hyun-joo** – **The Chaser** †
**Top Excellence Award, Actor**: **Song Joong-ki** – **The Innocent Man** †; Ahn Jae-wook – Lights and Shadows; Han Suk-kyu – Deep Rooted Tree; Kim Sang-joong – The Chaser; Shin Ha-kyun – Brain	**Top Excellence Award, Actress**: **Kim Nam-joo** – **My Husband Got a Family** †; Han Ga-in – Moon Embracing the Sun; Kim Ha-neul – A Gentleman's Dignity
**Excellence Award, Actor**: **Kim Soo-hyun** – **Moon Embracing the Sun** †; **Yoo Jun-sang** – **My Husband Got a Family** †; Joo Sang-wook – Feast of the Gods; Joo Won – Bridal Mask; So Ji-sub – Phantom; Uhm Tae-woong – Man from the Equator	**Excellence Award, Actress**: **Han Ji-min** – **Padam Padam** †; Ha Ji-won – The King 2 Hearts; Kim Ha-neul – A Gentleman's Dignity; Moon Chae-won – The Innocent Man; Moon Jeong-hee – My One And Only
**Acting Award, Actor**: **Lee Sung-min** – **Golden Time** †	**Acting Award, Actress**: **Kim Jung-nan** – **A Gentleman's Dignity** †; Jeon Mi-seon – Moon Embracing the Sun; Jin Se-yeon – Bridal Mask; Jung Eun-ji – Reply 1997; Lee Yoon-ji – The King 2 Hearts
**Rising Star Award**: **Jung Eun-ji** – **Reply 1997** †; **Kang Min-hyuk** – **My Husband Got a Family** †; **Kim Hyung-jun** – **Glowing She**, **Late Blossom** †; **Oh Yeon-seo** – **My Husband Got a Family** †; **Seo In-guk** – **Reply 1997** †; **Yoo In-na** – **Queen and I** †; **Yoon Jin-yi** – **A Gentleman's Dignity** †	**Best Young Actor/Actress**: **Kim So-hyun** – **Missing You**, **Ma Boy** †; **Kim Yoo-jung** – **Moon Embracing the Sun**, **May Queen** †; **Park Gun-tae** – **May Queen**, **The King 2 Hearts** †
**Best Production Director**: **Jo Nam-kook** – **The Chaser** †	**Best Writer**: **Park Ji-eun** – **My Husband Got a Family** †
**Best Villain**: **Yoon Yong-hyun** – **Giant (TV series)** †	**Best Comic Acting**: **Ahn Suk-hwan** – **Shut Up Family** †
**Best Original Soundtrack**: **"All for You" (Seo In-guk and Jung Eun-ji)** – **Reply 1997** †	**Best Action Stunts**: **Bridal Mask** †
**Top Popularity Award**: **Yoo Jun-sang** – **My Husband Got a Family** †	**Hallyu Star Award**: **Jung Yong-hwa** †
**Best Couple Award**: **Seo In-guk** and **Jung Eun-ji** – **Reply 1997** †	**Fashionista Award**: **Go Se-won** †; **Jeon Hye-bin** †
**Best Manager**: **Kim Jong-do, Namoo Actors** †	**Achievement Award**: **Lee Soon-jae** †
