= Choi Cheol-ho =

South Korean actor (born 1970)

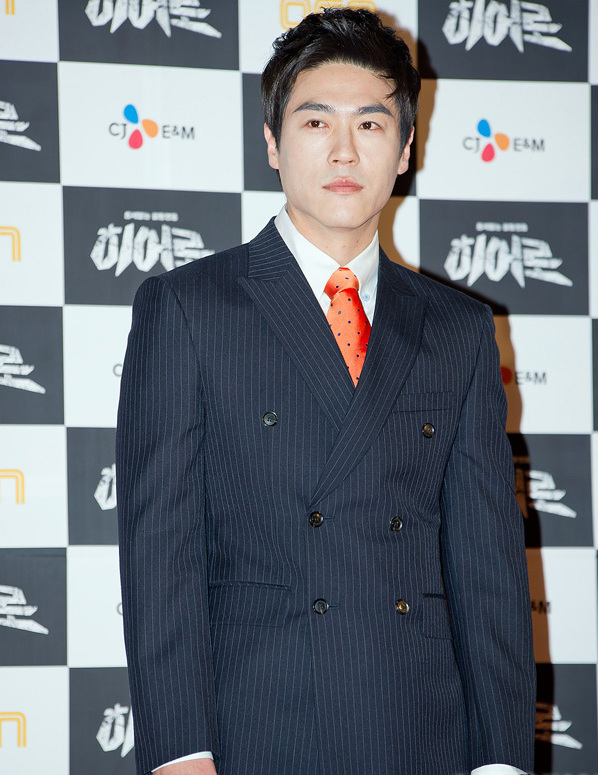
- Choi at OCN press conference for Hero in March 2012
- Born: 2 March 1970 (age 56); Seoul, South Korea
- Years active: 1990–present
- Agent: Office Zero
- Spouse: Kim Hye-sook (m. 2005)
- Children: 1

Korean name
- Hangul: 최철호
- Hanja: 崔哲浩
- RR: Choe Cheolho
- MR: Ch'oe Ch'ŏrho

Choi Cheol-ho (Korean: 최철호; born 2 March 1970) is a South Korean actor. He rose to fame after appearing in the hit drama Queen of Housewives (also known as My Wife is a Superwoman, 2009). Other notable roles include King Seonjo in The Immortal Lee Soon-shin (2004), Geolsa Biu in Dae Jo-yeong (2006) and King Gyeongjong in Empress Cheonchu (also known as The Iron Empress, 2009).

== Personal life ==
He married Kim Hye-sook on 7 August 2005. Kim was the Chungnam representative at the 2004 Miss Korea pageant. They have one son, Choi Min-joon.

Choi was investigated for drunkenly assaulting an aspiring actress on 8 July 2010, with the incident caught on CCTV.

== Filmography ==
=== Television series ===
- Advocate (MBC, 1998)
- Promise (SBS, 1999)
- Love in 3 Colors (KBS2, 1999)
- Golden Era (MBC, 2000)
- Well Known Woman (SBS, 2001)
- Father and Sons (SBS, 2001)
- Sunshine Hunting (KBS2, 2002)
- Five Brothers and Sisters (SBS, 2002)
- Rustic Period (SBS, 2002)
- On the Prairie (KBS2, 2003)
- Passion (MBC, 2004)
- Jang Gil-san (SBS, 2004)
- Just Like a Beautiful Flying Butterfly (CCTV-3, 2004)
- Immortal Admiral Yi Sun-sin (KBS1, 2004)
- Dangerous Love (KBS2, 2005)
- Even Now, Horse Chestnut (EBS, 2005)
- Secret Campus (EBS, 2006)
- Dae Jo-yeong (KBS1, 2006)
- S Clinic (Super Action, 2007)
- Urban Legends Deja Vu - Season 3 (Super Action, 2008)
- My Pitiful Sister (KBS1, 2008)
- KPSI - Season 2 (Super Action, 2008)
- Empress Cheonchu (KBS2, 2009)
- Queen of Housewives (MBC, 2009)
- Partner (KBS2, 2009)
- Hot Blood (KBS2, 2009)
- The Slave Hunters (KBS2, 2010)
- The Woman Who Still Wants to Marry (MBC, 2010)
- Dong Yi (MBC, 2010)
- Hero (OCN, 2012)
- Love Again (jTBC, 2012)
- Dream of the Emperor (KBS1, 2012)
- The Scandal (MBC, 2013)
- Inspiring Generation (KBS2, 2014)
- Cunning Single Lady (MBC, 2014)
- Into the Flames (TV Chosun, 2014)
- Gunman in Joseon (KBS2, 2014)
- Quiz of God 4 (OCN, 2014) (guest appearance, ep 11-12)
- Single-minded Dandelion (KBS2, 2014)
- The King's Face (KBS2, 2014)
- The Jingbirok: A Memoir of Imjin War (KBS1, 2015)
- Saimdang, Memoir of Colors (SBS, 2017)
- Dal Soon's Spring (KBS, 2017)
- Love Alert (MBN, 2018)
- River Where the Moon Rises (KBS2, 2021) - ep. #15

=== Film ===
- The Contact (1997)
- The Quiet Family (1998)
- Tie a Yellow Ribbon (1998)
- Calla (1999)
- The Butcher's Wife (1999)
- General Hospital the Movie: A Thousand Days (2000)
- Summertime (2001)
- Who's Got the Tape (2004)
- Solace (2006)
- My Pitiful Sister (2008)
- The Most Beautiful Picnic in The World (unreleased, filmed in 2010)
- Confession (2015)
- My Little Baby, Jaya (2017)

== Awards ==
- 2009 KBS Drama Awards: Best Supporting Actor (Empress Cheonchu, Hot Blood, Partner)
- 2009 MBC Drama Awards: Excellence Award, Actor (Queen of Housewives)
