= Kang Se-jung =

South Korean singer and actress (born 1982)

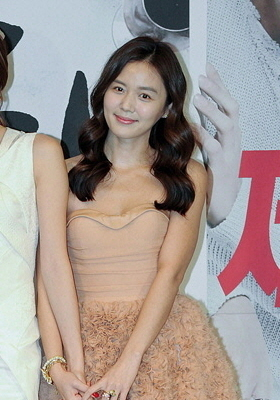
- Kang in 2018
- Born: Kang Se-jung; January 15, 1982 (age 44); Yeouido-dong, Yeongdeungpo District, Seoul, South Korea
- Other name: Ko Na-eun
- Education: Kyonggi University - Theater and Film
- Occupations: Actress; singer
- Years active: 2000–present
- Agent: Cube Entertainment

Korean name
- Hangul: 강세정
- Hanja: 康世丁
- RR: Gang Sejeong
- MR: Kang Sejŏng

Kang Se-jung (Korean: 강세정; born January 15, 1982) is a South Korean actress. She made her entertainment debut as a singer for the K-pop girl group Papaya in 2000; the group released two albums before disbanding in 2001. Kang began acting full-time in 2004, and has appeared in television series such as Assorted Gems (2009) and Heartless City (2013). Upon turning to acting, she used the stage name Go Na-eun (고나은) before reverting to use of her birth name in 2017.

== Filmography ==
=== Television series ===
Year	Title	Role
2004	Drama City "Witch Trial"	Mi-young
2007	Ahyeon-dong's Madam (aka Opposites Attract)	Lee Yeon-ji
2008	Fantastic and Strange Stories	
2008	My Life's Golden Age	Jin Soo-kyung
2009	Green Coach	Hong Geum-yeon
2009	Assorted Gems	Gung Bi-chwi ("Jade")
2011	Repair Man of My Heart	Yeo-kyung
2012	Glowing She	Kim Kkot-nim
2012	Angel's Choice	Kang Yoo-ran
2013	Heartless City	Lee Kyung-mi
2013	Goddess of Marriage	Han Se-kyung
2014	Jeong Do-jeon	Lady Min
2016	God of War, Zhao Yun	Sun Shangxiang
2017	The Secret of My Love	Jin Yeo-rim / Ki Seo-ra
2020	Brilliant Heritage	Gong Gye-ok
2021	Young Lady and Gentleman	Jiyoung / Anna Kim (Cameo, episode 1)

=== Film ===
Year	Title	Role
2006	Ganglamedo	An Yu
2011	You're My Pet	Kim Jin-ah
2011	Her 13th Month	Lee Yeo-kyung

=== Music video appearances ===
Year	Song title	Artist
1999	"氷" (빙, version 1)	거리의 시인들 (Street Poets)
2004	"B-Type Man"	Kim Hyun-jung (singer)
2004	"Destiny"	숄 (Sol)
2006	"Memories"	Yurisangja
2007	"Can't Forget"	PK Heman
2008	"Hope You Are Happy"	Lee Ki-chan

=== Television show ===
Year	Title	Role	Ref.
—N/a	딩동댕 유치원		
2008–2009	Fantasy Couple	Cast Member	
2022	Queen of Ssireum	Participant	

== Theater ==
Year	Title	Role
2010	I'll Marry in May	Uhm Jung-eun

== Awards ==
Year	Award	Category	Nominated work	Ref.
2009	MBC Drama Awards	Excellence Award, Actress	Assorted Gems	
2012	20th Korean Culture and Entertainment Awards	Excellence Award, Actress in a Drama	Assorted Gems, Angel's Choice	
