= Kim Nam-joo (actress) =

South Korean actress (born 1971)

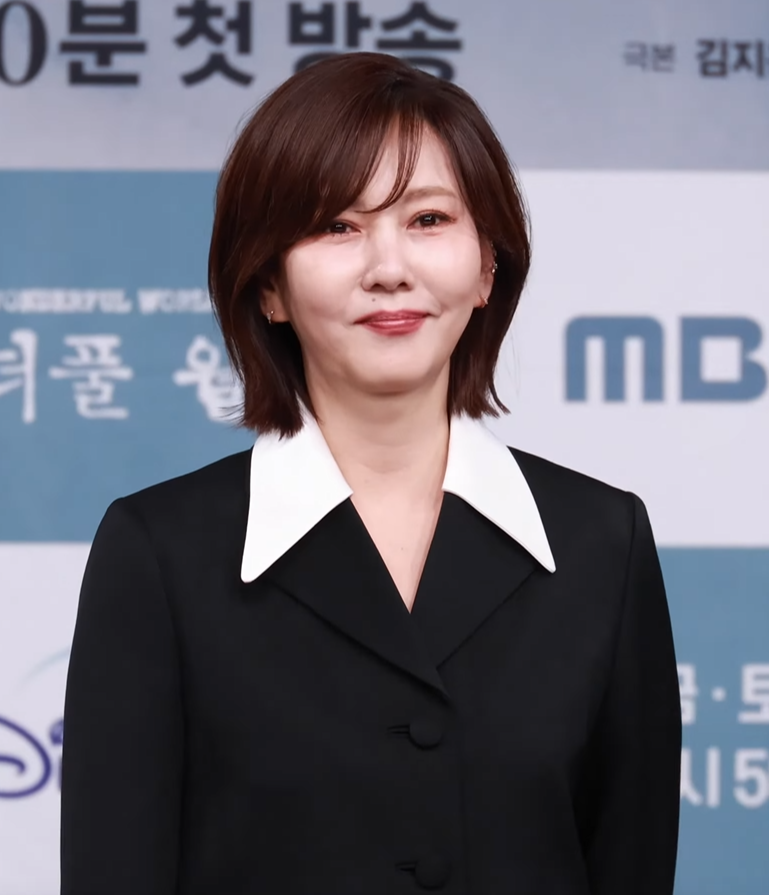
- Kim in 2024
- Born: May 10, 1971 (age 55); Pyeongtaek, South Korea
- Education: Suwon Women's College – Dance; Kyung Hee University – Theater and Film
- Occupation: Actress
- Years active: 1994–present
- Agent: The Queen
- Spouse: Kim Seung-woo (m. 2005)
- Children: 2

Korean name
- Hangul: 김남주
- Hanja: 金南珠
- RR: Gim Namju
- MR: Kim Namju

Kim Nam-joo (Korean: 김남주; born May 10, 1971) is a South Korean actress. Kim rose to stardom in the 1990s in television series such as Model, The Boss and Her House. After 2001, Kim went into semi-retirement, appearing only in commercials, particularly after she married actor Kim Seung-woo in 2005 and they started a family. Then in 2009, she made her comeback with Queen of Housewives, written by Park Ji-eun. Housewives was a rating hit, and Kim went on to collaborate with Park on Queen of Reversals (2010) and top-rated series My Husband Got a Family, which established Kim's continuing star status. In 2018, Kim received critical acclaim for her role in the series Misty.

Thanks to the growing popularity of TV dramas that portray the lives of working women in their 30s and 40s, Kim is considered one of the few established Korean actresses in their 30s, 40s and even 50s, reversing an ageist trend that dictated casting for decades.

== Early life ==
Kim was born in Seoul, South Korea. When she was two years old, her father's business failed, which resulted in the family moving to Pyeongtaek, Gyeonggi Province, where Kim spent her childhood and adolescence. After graduating from high school, she enrolled as a Dance major at Suwon Women's College. When she was a sophomore, Kim joined the Miss Korea pageant, and the experience led her to quit school to pursue modeling in September 1992.

== Career ==
Kim won fourth place in a talent search by broadcaster SBS in 1994, and quickly became a popular television star in her twenties. Her characters in the hit TV series City Men and Women (1996), Model (1997), The Boss (1999) and Her House (2001), made her the epitome of a sophisticated, urban career woman in 1990s Korea. But after Her House, Kim went into semi-retirement, only appearing in lucrative commercials, mostly for cosmetics and luxury goods. She married actor Kim Seung-woo in 2005, and for several years she lived as a full-time housewife and mother.

In 2007, she stretched some acting muscle opposite Sul Kyung-gu in Voice of a Murderer, about the tormenting and ultimately unsuccessful attempts of two parents to bring their kidnapped son back home. Based on the true story of a nine-year-old child found dead in 1991, the film faithfully follows the harrowing 44-day quest to find the missing boy.

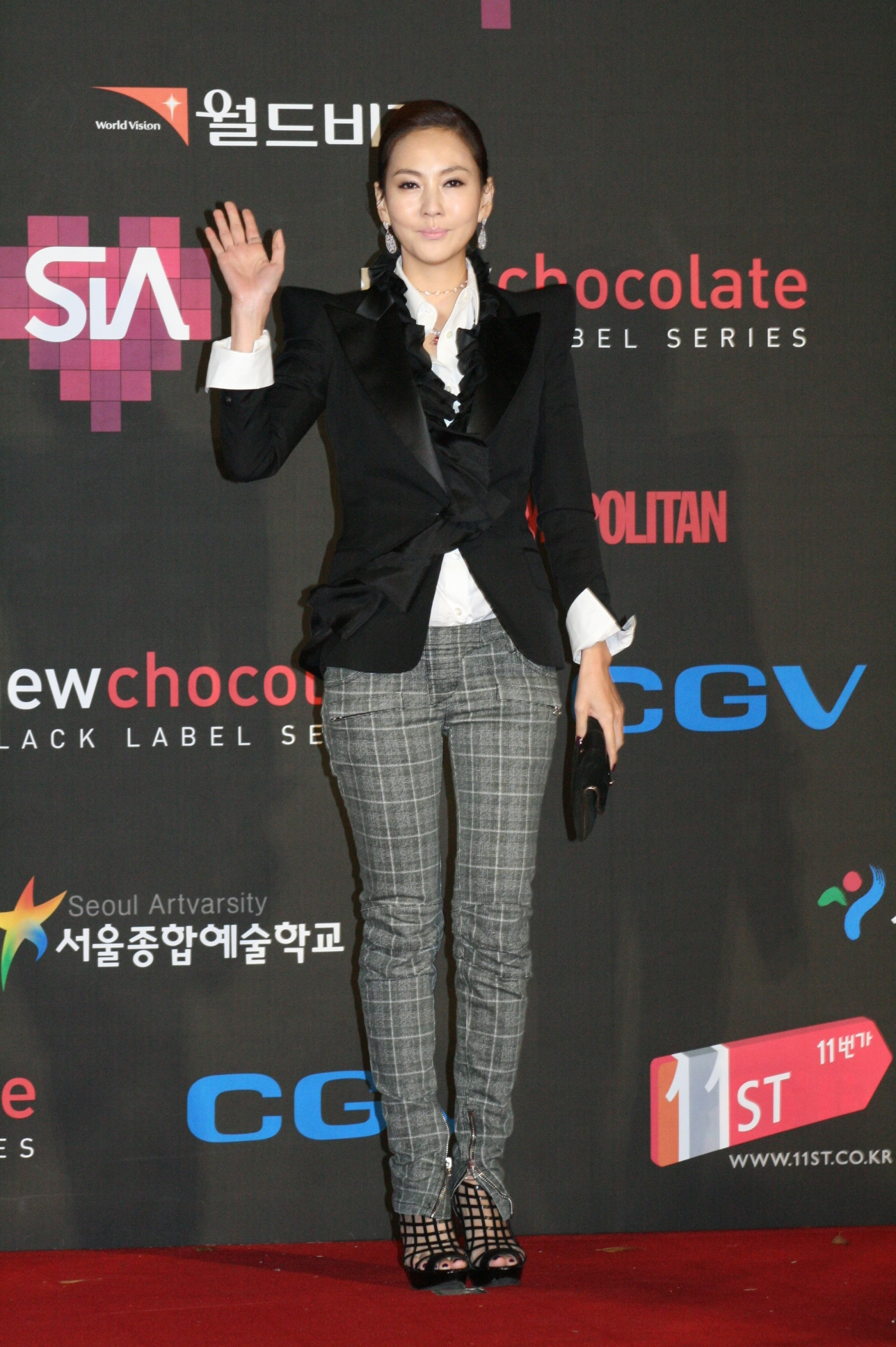
Kim at the 2009 Style Icon Awards

Kim made a successful television comeback in Queen of Housewives (also known as My Wife is a Superwoman) in 2009. A comedy drama that depicts the life of housewives who devote their entire lives to their husbands' success, it became one of the most-watched shows during its run, topping Korea's TV ratings charts for three consecutive weeks. It also created new trends among married women in terms of confidence, fashion and makeup. Kim's character Chun Ji-ae was once the most popular girl in high school, and she's determined to help her smart but clueless husband climb the corporate ladder once she realizes that he is an underperformer at work. Chun meets her match, however, when she discovers that his boss is the husband of her high school frenemy. Her portrayal of a modern Korean housewife won Kim numerous accolades.

Kim reunited with Queen of Housewives writer Park Ji-eun in another workplace romantic dramedy, the 2010s Queen of Reversals. This time Kim played a strong and decisive character, a careerwoman, trying to balance work and married life. Her character Hwang Tae-hee experiences the many ups, downs, and reversals of work, family, and romance as she falls in and out of love and marriage. Ratings-wise Queen of Reversals was less successful than its predecessor, though Kim was awarded the highest award (Daesang or "Grand Prize") at MBC's year-end drama awards ceremony.

She also released her book that year, called Kim Nam-joo's House. The collection of essays and photographs is a candid discussion of her family life and home.

Kim then led the 2012 weekend family drama My Husband Got a Family (also known as You Who Rolled in Unexpectedly and Unexpected You), which took a comedic and serious approach to the trials and tribulations of a TV director dealing with her in-laws when her husband reunites with his biological parents. Kim and Park's third collaboration was a big hit with audiences, it was number one on the 2012 yearly TV ratings chart with average ratings of 33.1 percent and a ratings peak of 52.3 percent, and Kim won another Daesang at the KBS Drama Awards.

Kim returned to television after a six-year hiatus, starring in the romance thriller, Misty. The drama was both a ratings and critical success and Kim earned praise for her portrayal of a controversial character.

Kim returned to television after a six-year hiatus, starring in the revenge thriller, Wonderful World. and won the Best Acting Award, Actress at the MBC Drama Awards.

== Filmography ==
=== Television series ===
Year	Title	Role
1993	Dinosaur Teacher	
1994	Hero's Diary	Ma Cheong-mi
1995	Mystery of Inside the Mirror	Na Eun-ah
1995	Hymn of Love	Kim Jae-kyung
1996	City Men and Women	Na Min-joo
1996	Man's Great Exploration	Oh Jin-joo
1997	Model	Song Kyung-rin
1998	Fascinate My Heart	Han Ye-rin
1998	A Very Special Trip	Soo-jung
1998	Victory	Seo Hee-jung
1999	My Love Han Ji-soon	Han Ji-soon
1999	The Boss	Min-jae
1999	Crystal	Kim Eun-hye
2001	Her House	Kim Young-wook
2009	Queen of Housewives	Chun Ji-ae
2010	Queen of Reversals	Hwang Tae-hee
2012	My Husband Got a Family	Cha Yoon-hee
2018	Misty	Go Hye-ran
2024	Wonderful World	Eun Soo-hyun

=== Film ===
Year	Title	Role
2001	I Love You	Hyun-soo
2007	Voice of a Murderer	Oh Ji-sun

=== Variety show ===
Year	Title	Notes
1996	Popular Music Best 50	MC
1997	SBS Gayo Daejeon	MC
1998	Beautiful TV - Star Monologues with Park Sang-won	
2000–2001	Entertainment Weekly	MC
2009	Oh My Lifestyle	
2010	Miracle of Christmas	Documentary narration

== Bibliography ==
Year	Title	Publisher	ISBN
2010	Kim Nam-joo's House	That Book	ISBN 9788994040110

== Accolades ==
=== Awards and nominations ===
Year	Award	Category	Nominated work	Result	Ref.
1992	Miss Match Jeans	—N/a	—N/a	Won	
1996	SBS Drama Awards	Excellence Award, Actress	City Men and Women	Won	
1998	SBS Drama Awards	Popularity Award	Model	Won	
2001	MBC Drama Awards	Top Excellence Award, Actress	Her House	Won	
2009	17th Korean Culture and Entertainment Awards	Top Excellence Award, Actress	Queen of Housewives	Won	
2009	MBC Drama Awards	Top Excellence Award, Actress	Queen of Housewives	Won	
2009	2nd Style Icon Awards	Style Icon, TV Star category	Queen of Housewives	Won	
2009	Ministry of Culture, Sports and Tourism	Actress of the Year	Queen of Housewives	Won	
2010	46th Baeksang Arts Awards	Best Actress	Queen of Housewives	Won	
2010	CETV Awards	Grand Prize (Daesang)	Queen of Housewives	Won	
2010	CETV Awards	Top 10 Asian Stars	Queen of Housewives	Won	
2010	MBC Drama Awards	Grand Prize (Daesang)	Queen of Reversals	Won	
2010	MBC Drama Awards	Top Excellence Award, Actress	Queen of Reversals	Nominated	
2012	5th Korea Drama Awards	Grand Prize (Daesang)	My Husband Got a Family	Won	
2012	20th Korean Culture and Entertainment Awards	Grand Prize (Daesang)	My Husband Got a Family	Won	
2012	KBS Drama Awards	Grand Prize (Daesang)	My Husband Got a Family	Won	
2012	KBS Drama Awards	Top Excellence Award, Actress	My Husband Got a Family	Nominated	
2012	KBS Drama Awards	Excellence Award, Actress in a Serial Drama	My Husband Got a Family	Nominated	
2012	KBS Drama Awards	Best Couple Award with Yoo Jun-sang	My Husband Got a Family	Won	
2012	1st K-Drama Star Awards	Top Excellence Award, Actress	My Husband Got a Family	Won	
2012	25th Grimae Awards	Best Actress	My Husband Got a Family	Won	
2013	49th Baeksang Arts Awards	Best Actress	My Husband Got a Family	Nominated	
2018	54th Baeksang Arts Awards	Best Actress	Misty	Won	
2018	6th APAN Star Awards	Grand Prize (Daesang)	Misty	Nominated	
2018	2nd The Seoul Awards	Best Actress	Misty	Won	
2018	24th Korean Popular Culture & Arts Awards	Presidential Commendation	—N/a	Won	
2019	23rd Asian Television Awards	Best Actress	Misty	Won	
2024	MBC Drama Awards	Grand Prize (Daesang)	Wonderful World	Nominated	
2024	MBC Drama Awards	Top Excellence Award, Actress in a Miniseries	Wonderful World	Nominated	
2024	MBC Drama Awards	Best Acting Award, Actress	Wonderful World	Won	

=== Listicles ===
Name of publisher, year listed, name of listicle, and placement
Publisher	Year	Listicle	Placement	Ref.
Forbes	2013	Korea Power Celebrity	32nd	
