= Assorted Gems =

South Korean television series

- Also known as: Jewel Bibimbap; The Jewel Family
- Genre: Romance; Family; Drama
- Written by: Im Sung-han
- Directed by: Baek Ho-min
- Starring: Go Na-eun; Lee Tae-gon; So Yi-hyun; Lee Hyun-jin; Lee Il-min
- Country of origin: South Korea
- Original language: Korean
- No. of episodes: 85

Production
- Producer: Kim Jeong-ho
- Running time: 60 minutes

Original release
- Network: Munhwa Broadcasting Corporation
- Release: 5 September 2009 – 13 June 2010

Assorted Gems (Korean: 보석비빔밥; RR: Boseok bibimbap; lit. 'Jewel Bibimbap') is a 2009 South Korean television series starring Go Na-eun, Lee Tae-gon, So Yi-hyun, Lee Hyun-jin, and Lee Il-min. It aired on MBC from 5 September 2009 to 21 February 2010.

== Synopsis ==
The family drama Assorted Gems revolves around four siblings of the Gung family. All are named after precious jewels: eldest daughter, Bi-chwi (Jade), eldest son San-ho (Coral), second daughter Ryu-bi (Ruby), and younger son Ho-bak (Amber).

Bi-chwi and Ruby are two pretty but shallow women who wish to marry rich men to live comfortable lives. San-ho's goal is to pass the bar exam and gain wealth and status as a prosecutor, and Ho-bak is always getting into fistfights.

Their various personalities and differences lead to conflicts within the family and in their love lives.

== Cast and characters ==
Gung family

- Go Na-eun as Gung Bi-chwi (Jade)
- So Yi-hyun as Gung Ryu-bi (Ruby)
- Lee Hyun-jin as Gung San-ho (Coral)
- Lee Il-min as Gung Ho-bak (Amber)
- Recipon Leo as Gung Tae-ja (Prince, youngest son of Sang-shik and Hye-ja)
- Han Jin-hee as Gung Sang-shik, father
- Han Hye-sook as Pi Hye-ja, mother
- Kim Young-ok as Kyul Myung-ja, Sang-shik's mother
- Jung Hye-sun as Baek Jo, Hye-ja's mother

Seo family

- Lee Tae-gon as Seo Young-guk
- Lee Ah-jin as Seo Kkeut-soon, sister
- Park Geun-hyung as Seo Ro-ma, father
- Hong Yoo-jin as Lee Tae-ri, mother

Supporting cast

- Michael Blunck as Kyle Huntington
- Jeong Yu-mi as Lee Kang-ji
- Seo Woo-rim as Boss ("Sajang")
- Yoon Jong-hwa as Yoo Byung-hoon, doctor and Ryu-bi's boyfriend
- Won Jong-rye as Byung-hoon's mother
- Jung Yi-yeon as Myung Sun-mi, nurse
- Choi Jae-ho as Ji Bang-kyu, hotel door attendant
- Hwang Hyo-eun as Ma Ye-soon, Seo family maid
- Kwon Min as Hwang Woo-bin, actor
- Seo Dong-soo as Director Kim
- Hong Seok-cheon as Director Hong
- Noh Haeng-ha as Hye-jeong
- Han Ji-hoo as Tae-sung
- Oh Mi-hee as Kyle's Korean stepmother
- Seol Woon-do as Seol Hwang-do
- Shin Shin-ae as Hye-ja's friend
- Choi Hyo-eun as Jae-eun
- Kim Kwang-kyu as plastic surgeon
- Kim Da-som as Ho Soon (eps. 13, 14)

== Awards ==
2009 MBC Drama Awards

- Excellence Award, Actress: Go Na-eun
- Golden Acting Award, Actress in a Serial Drama: Kim Young-ok
- Golden Acting Award, Actress in a Serial Drama: Jung Hye-sun
