= 2009 MBC Drama Awards =

28th edition of award ceremony

- Date: December 30, 2009
- Hosted by: Lee Hwi-jae; Park Ye-jin

Highlights
- Grand Prize (Daesang): Go Hyun-jung

Television coverage
- Network: MBC

The 2009 MBC Drama Awards (Korean: MBC 연기대상) is a ceremony honoring the outstanding achievement in television on the Munhwa Broadcasting Corporation (MBC) network for the year of 2009. It was held on December 30, 2009 and hosted by actor Lee Hwi-jae and actress Park Ye-jin.

== Nominations and winners ==
(Winners denoted in bold)

Grand Prize (Daesang)
**Go Hyun-jung** – **Queen Seondeok**
Top Excellence Award, Actor	Top Excellence Award, Actress
**Uhm Tae-woong** – **Queen Seondeok**; **Yoon Sang-hyun** – **Queen of Housewives**; Lee Joon-gi – Hero	**Kim Nam-joo** – **Queen of Housewives**; **Lee Yo-won** – **Queen Seondeok**; Go Hyun-jung – Queen Seondeok; Shin Eun-kyung – White Lies
Excellence Award, Actor	Excellence Award, Actress
**Choi Cheol-ho** – **Queen of Housewives**; **Kim Nam-gil** – **Queen Seondeok**; Hyun Bin – Friend, Our Legend; Jeon No-min – Queen Seondeok; Kim Min-jun – Friend, Our Legend	**Go Na-eun** – **Assorted Gems**; **Lee Hye-young** – **Queen of Housewives**; Ha Hee-ra – What's for Dinner?; Park Ye-jin – Queen Seondeok
Golden Acting Award, Actor in a Miniseries	Golden Acting Award, Actress in a Miniseries
**Kim Chang-wan** – **Queen of Housewives**, **Triple**	**Na Young-hee** – **Queen of Housewives**
Golden Acting Award, Actor in a Serial Drama	Golden Acting Award, Actress in a Serial Drama
	**Jung Hye-sun** – **Assorted Gems**; **Kim Young-ok** – **Assorted Gems**
Golden Acting Award, Supporting Actor	Golden Acting Award, Supporting Actress
**Ahn Gil-kang** – **Queen Seondeok**	**Seo Young-hee** – **Queen Seondeok**
Golden Acting Award, Veteran Actor	Golden Acting Award, Veteran Actress
**Kang Nam-gil** – **Creating Destiny**	**Jung Ae-ri** – **Good Job, Good Job**, **Can't Stop Now**
Best New Actor	Best New Actress
**Lee Seung-hyo** – **Queen Seondeok**; **Yoo Seung-ho** – **Queen Seondeok**; Kim Nam-gil – Queen Seondeok; Im Joo-hwan – Tamra, the Island; Jung Yun-ho – Heading to the Ground	**Lim Ju-eun** – **Soul**; **Seo Woo** – **Tamra, the Island**; Min Hyo-rin – Triple; Sunwoo Sun – Queen of Housewives
Best Young Actor	Best Young Actress
**Lee Hyung-suk** – **Enjoy Life**	**Jeon Min-seo** – **Good Job, Good Job**; **Nam Ji-hyun** – **Queen Seondeok**
PD Award	Writer of the Year
**Shin Goo** – **Queen Seondeok**	**Kim Young-hyun**, **Park Sang-yeon** – **Queen Seondeok**; **Noh Kyung-hee** – **Tears of the Arctic**; **Park Ji-eun** – **Queen of Housewives**
Popularity Award, Actor	Popularity Award, Actress
**Lee Joon-gi** – **Hero**; Kim Nam-gil - Queen Seondeok; Lee Seung-hyo - Queen Seondeok; Yoo Seung-ho - Queen Seondeok; Yoon Sang-hyun - Queen of Housewives	**Seo Woo** – **Tamra, the Island**; Go Hyun-jung - Queen Seondeok; Go Na-eun - Assorted Gems; Kim Nam-joo - Queen of Housewives; Lee Yo-won - Queen Seondeok; Park Ye-jin - Queen Seondeok
Best Couple Award	Viewer's Favorite Drama of the Year
**Kim Nam-gil** and **Lee Yo-won** – **Queen Seondeok**; Choi Cheol-ho and Lee Hye-young - Queen of Housewives; Lee Tae-gon and Go Na-eun - Assorted Gems; Lee Tae-sung and Kim Yoo-mi - Enjoy Life; Oh Ji-ho and Kim Nam-joo - Queen of Housewives; Yoon Sang-hyun and Sunwoo Sun - Queen of Housewives	**Queen Seondeok**; Assorted Gems; Queen of Housewives; Soul; Tamra, the Island
Family Award	Best TV Voice Actor
**Enjoy Life**	**Sung Sun-nyeo** – **Zero**; **Choi Han** – **CSI: Crime Scene Investigation**
Special Award in TV, Announcer	Special Award in TV, Martial Arts Director
**Oh Sang-jin**	**Kim Sung-shil** – **Queen Seondeok**
Top Excellence Award in Radio	Excellence Award in Radio
**Sohn Suk-hee** – **Sohn Suk-hee's Focus**	**Park Myeong-su** – **Park Myeong-su's 2 o'clock Date**; **Shindong** – **Shindong and Kim Shin-young's ShimShimTapa**
Best Newcomer in Radio	Best Writer in Radio
**Kim Tae-yeon** – **Taeyeon's Good Friends**	**Ryu Mi-na** – **Now Is the Era of Radio**
Special Award in Radio, DJ	Special Award in Radio, Reporter
**Jang Jin** – **Radio Book Club**	**Choi Soo-yeon** – **Sohn Suk-hee's Focus**
Special Award in Radio, Voice Actor	Achievement Award
**Won Ho-seob** – **Turbulent Fifties**	**Choi Jae-ho** – **전 탤랜터실장**; **Heo Gu-yeon** – **Baseball commentator**; **Lee Seok-young** – **Writer, Turbulent Fifties**; **Park Jung-ran** – **Writer, I Love You, Don't Cry**
