= MBC Drama Awards =

South Korea Drama Awards

- Current: 2025 MBC Drama Awards
- Awarded for: Excellence in Drama and Television Arts
- Location: Seoul
- Country: South Korea
- Presented by: Munhwa Broadcasting Corporation
- First award: 1982
- Final award: 2025

Korean name
- Hangul: MBC 연기대상
- Hanja: MBC 演技大賞
- RR: MBC yeongi daesang
- MR: MBC yŏn'gi taesang

The MBC Drama Awards (Korean: MBC 연기대상) is an awards ceremony presented by Munhwa Broadcasting Corporation (MBC) for outstanding achievements in Korean dramas aired on its network. It is held annually in December.

Unlike its counterparts in KBS and SBS, MBC's highest honor of the ceremony, the "Grand Prize" (대상; daesang), has been determined through viewer's votes in 2014, 2015 and 2016, not by professional judges. The process has been widely criticized.

== Categories ==
- Grand Prize (대상) is given to the best actor/actress of the year.
- Drama of the Year (올해의 드라마)
- Top Excellence in Acting Award (최우수상)
- Excellence in Acting Award (우수상)
- Golden Acting Award (황금 연기상)
- Top 10 MBC Drama Stars is awarded to actors who have shown talent, hard work, and star power during the year.
- Best Supporting Actor is given to the actor that showed the most talent and presence in a supporting role.
- Best New Actor/Actress (신인상)
- Best Young Actor/Actress (아역 연기상)
- Writer of the Year (올해의 작가상)
- 'Producer's Award (프로듀서상)' or PD Award (방송 3사 드라마 PD가 뽑은 올해의 연기자상) is given to the best actor/actress, as determined by PDs from all three broadcasters.
- Popularity Award (인기상) or Netizen Popularity Award (네티즌 인기상)
- Best Couple Award (베스트 커플상) is given to the best drama couple/s as voted by the netizens.
- 'Viewer's Favorite Drama of the Year (시청자가 뽑은 올해의 드라마)'
- Family Award (가족상)
- Special Award (특별상)
- Achievement Award (공로상)
- Best Character Award (최고의 캐릭터상)
  - Best Villain Award (최고의 악역상)
  - Fighting Spirit Acting Award (투혼 연기상)
  - Comic Character Award (코믹 캐릭터상)

== Grand Prize (Daesang) ==
Note: 2014–2016, the Daesang has been determined through viewer's votes.

No.	Year	Winner	Drama
1	1982	Lee Mi-sook	Jang Hui-bin
2	1983	Jung Hye-sun	Kan-nan-yi
3	1984	Jung Ae-ri	Love and Truth
3	1984	Won Mi-kyung	Love and Truth
4	1985	Kim Yong-rim	Silver Grass
5	1986	Kim Soo-mi	Country Diaries, The Season of Men
6	1987	Lee Deok-hwa	Love and Ambition
7	1988	Kim Hye-ja	Sand Castle
8	1989	Won Mi-kyung	A Happy Woman
9	1990	Go Doo-shim	The Dancing Gayageum
10	1991	Kim Hee-ae	Beyond the Mountains
11	1992	Kim Hye-ja	What Is Love?
12	1993	Kim Hee-ae	Sons and Daughters
13	1994	Chae Shi-ra	The Moon of Seoul
14	1995	Chae Shi-ra	Apartment
15	1996	Kim Hye-soo	Partner
16	1997	Choi Jin-sil	Star in My Heart
17	1998	Kim Ji-soo	See and See Again
18	1999	Kim Hye-ja	Roses and Beansprouts
19	2000	Jun Kwang-ryul	Hur Jun
20	2001	Cha In-pyo	Her House
21	2002	Jang Seo-hee	Miss Mermaid
22	2003	Lee Young-ae	Dae Jang Geum
23	2004	Go Doo-shim	Ode to the Han River
24	2005	Kim Sun-a	My Lovely Sam Soon
25	2006	Song Il-gook	Jumong
26	2007	Bae Yong-joon	The Legend
27	2008	Kim Myung-min	Beethoven Virus
27	2008	Song Seung-heon	East of Eden
28	2009	Go Hyun-jung	Queen Seondeok
29	2010	Han Hyo-joo	Dong Yi
29	2010	Kim Nam-joo	Queen of Reversals
30	2011	—N/a	—N/a
31	2012	Cho Seung-woo	The King's Doctor
32	2013	Ha Ji-won	Empress Ki
33	2014	Lee Yoo-ri	Jang Bo-ri Is Here!
34	2015	Ji Sung	Kill Me, Heal Me
35	2016	Lee Jong-suk	W – Two World
36	2017	Kim Sang-joong	The Rebel
37	2018	So Ji-sub	My Secret Terrius
38	2019	Kim Dong-wook	Special Labor Inspector
39	2020	Park Hae-jin	Kkondae Intern
40	2021	Namkoong Min	The Veil
41	2022	Lee Jong-suk	Big Mouth
42	2023	Namkoong Min	My Dearest
43	2024	Han Suk-kyu	Doubt
44	2025	Seo Kang-joon	Undercover High School

== Drama of the Year ==
Year	Winner
2006	Couple or Trouble
2011	The Greatest Love
2012	Moon Embracing the Sun
2013	A Hundred Year Legacy
2014	Jang Bo-ri is Here!
2015	Kill Me, Heal Me
2016	W – Two World
2017	The Rebel
2018	My Secret Terrius
2019	Extraordinary You
2020	Kkondae Intern
2021	The Red Sleeve
2022	Big Mouth
2023	My Dearest
2024	Chief Detective 1958

== Top Excellence in Acting Awards ==
=== Best Actor ===
Year	Winner	Drama
1985	Kil Yong-woo	Eulalia Grass
1991	Choi Jae-sung	Eyes of Dawn
1992	Choi Soo-jong	
1993	Choi Soo-jong	
1994	Han Suk-kyu	The Moon of Seoul
1995	Jeong Bo-seok	My Son's Woman
1996	Baek Il-seob	
1997	Jang Dong-gun	Medical Brothers
2000	Ahn Jae-wook	Bad Friends, Mothers and Sisters
2001	Cha In-pyo	Her House
2001	Kang Seok-woo	How Should I Be?
2003	Kim Rae-won	Cats on the Roof
2004	Choi Min-soo	Ode to the Han River
2004	Lee Seo-jin	Phoenix
2005	Eric Mun	Super Rookie
2005	Hyun Bin	My Lovely Sam Soon
2006	Jun Kwang-ryul	Jumong
2006	Song Il-gook	Jumong
2007	Kim Myung-min	Behind the White Tower
2007	Lee Seo-jin	Yi San
2008	Cho Jae-hyun	New Heart
2008	Jung Joon-ho	Last Scandal
2009	Uhm Tae-woong	Queen Seondeok
2009	Yoon Sang-hyun	Queen of Housewives
2010	Ji Jin-hee	Dong Yi
2010	Jung Joon-ho	Queen of Reversals

=== Best Actress ===
Year	Winner	Drama
1975	Jung Hye-sun	Reed
1986	Kim Soo-mi	Country Diaries
1987	Cha Hwa-yeon	Love and Ambition
1989	Jeon In-hwa	
1990	Choi Myung-gil	That Woman
1990	Kim Hee-ae	Forget Tomorrow
1991	Chae Shi-ra	Eyes of Dawn
1995	Kim Hye-soo	
1996	Hwang Shin-hye	Lovers
1997	Hwang Shin-hye	Cinderella
1998	Oh Yeon-soo	
1999	Kim Hye-soo	
2000	Hwang Soo-jung	Hur Jun
2000	Won Mi-kyung	Ajumma
2001	Kim Nam-joo	Her House
2001	Song Yun-ah	Hotelier, Sweet Bear
2003	Ha Ji-won	Damo
2004	Kim Hye-soo	Ode to the Han River
2004	Lee Eun-ju	Phoenix
2005	Han Hye-jin	Be Strong, Geum-soon!
2005	Kim Sun-a	My Lovely Sam Soon
2006	Ha Hee-ra	Love Me When You Can
2006	Han Hye-jin	Jumong
2007	Gong Hyo-jin	Thank You
2007	Yoon Eun-hye	The 1st Shop of Coffee Prince
2008	Bae Jong-ok	Woman of Matchless Beauty, Park Jung-geum
2008	Lee Mi-sook	East of Eden
2009	Kim Nam-joo	Queen of Housewives
2009	Lee Yo-won	Queen Seondeok
2010	Gong Hyo-jin	Pasta
2010	Shin Eun-kyung	Flames of Desire

=== Best Actor in a Miniseries ===
Year	Winner	Drama
2002	Kam Woo-sung	I Love You, Hyun-jung
2011	Cha Seung-won	The Greatest Love
2012	Kim Soo-hyun	Moon Embracing the Sun
2013	Lee Seung-gi	Gu Family Book
2014	Jang Hyuk	Fated to Love You
2015	Ji Sung	Kill Me, Heal Me
2016	Lee Jong-suk	W – Two World
2017	Yoo Seung-ho	The Emperor: Owner of the Mask
2021	Lee Jun-ho	The Red Sleeve
2022	Yook Sung-jae	The Golden Spoon
2023	Woo Do-hwan	Joseon Attorney
2024	Lee Je-hoon	Chief Detective 1958
2024	Yoo Yeon-seok	When the Phone Rings

=== Best Actress in a Miniseries ===
Year	Winner	Drama
2002	Kim Ha-neul	Romance
2011	Gong Hyo-jin	The Greatest Love
2012	Han Ga-in	Moon Embracing the Sun
2013	Bae Suzy	Gu Family Book
2014	Jang Na-ra	Fated to Love You
2015	Hwang Jung-eum	Kill Me, Heal Me
2016	Han Hyo-joo	W – Two World
2017	Ha Ji-won	Hospital Ship
2021	Lee Se-young	The Red Sleeve
2022	Im Yoon-ah	Big Mouth
2023	Ahn Eun-jin	My Dearest
2023	Lee Se-young	The Story of Park's Marriage Contract
2024	Lee Hanee	Knight Flower

=== Best Actor in a Special Project Drama ===
Year	Winner	Drama
2012	Cho Seung-woo	The King's Doctor
2013	Joo Jin-mo	Empress Ki
2013	Kim Jaewon	Scandal: A Shocking and Wrongful Incident
2014	Jung Il-woo	The Night Watchman's Journal
2015	Jung Jin-young	Glamorous Temptation
2016	Lee Seo-jin	Marriage Contract

=== Best Actress in a Special Project Drama ===
Year	Winner	Drama
2012	Sung Yu-ri	Feast of the Gods
2013	Shin Eun-kyung	Scandal: A Shocking and Wrongful Incident
2014	Song Yun-ah	Mama
2015	Jeon In-hwa	4 Legendary Witches, My Daughter, Geum Sa-wol
2016	Uee	Marriage Contract

=== Best Actor in a Serial Drama ===
Year	Winner	Drama
2002	Lee Jae-ryong	Sangdo
2011	Kim Suk-hoon	Twinkle Twinkle
2012	Kim Jaewon	May Queen
2013	Lee Jung-jin	A Hundred Year Legacy
2014	Kim Ji-hoon	Jang Bo-ri is Here!
2015	Song Chang-eui	Make a Woman Cry
2016	Lee Sang-woo	Happy Home
2018	Yeon Jung-hoon	My Healing Love

=== Best Actress in a Serial Drama ===
Year	Winner	Drama
2002	Jang Seo-hee	Miss Mermaid
2011	Kim Hyun-joo	Twinkle Twinkle
2011	Shin Ae-ra	Indomitable Daughters-in-Law
2012	Han Ji-hye	May Queen
2013	Han Ji-hye	Pots of Gold
2014	Oh Yeon-seo	Jang Bo-ri is Here!
2015	Kim Jung-eun	Make a Woman Cry
2016	Kim So-yeon	Happy Home
2018	So Yoo-jin	My Healing Love

=== Best Actor in a Weekend Drama ===
Year	Winner	Drama
2017	Jang Hyuk	Money Flower
2018	Kim Kang-woo	My Contracted Husband, Mr. Oh
2019	Lee Sang-woo	The Golden Garden

=== Best Actress in a Weekend Drama ===
Year	Winner	Drama
2017	Lee Mi-sook	Money Flower
2018	Chae Si-ra	Goodbye to Goodbye
2018	Lee Yoo-ri	Hide and Seek
2019	Ye Ji-won	Never Twice

=== Best Actor in a Soap Opera ===
Year	Winner	Drama
2017	Go Se-won	Return of Fortunate Bok

=== Best Actress in a Soap Opera ===
Year	Winner	Drama
2017	Kim Mi-kyung	Person Who Gives Happiness

=== Best Actor in a Monday-Tuesday Drama ===
Year	Winner	Drama
2017	Jo Jung-suk	Two Cops
2017	Kim Ji-seok	Children of the 20th Century
2018	Jung Jae-young	Partners for Justice
2018	Shin Ha-kyun	Less Than Evil
2019	Kim Dong-wook	Special Labor Inspector
2020	Shin Sung-rok	Kairos

=== Best Actress in a Monday-Tuesday Drama ===
Year	Winner	Drama
2017	Lee Ha-nui	The Rebel
2018	Jeong Yu-mi	Partners for Justice
2019	Lim Ji-yeon	Welcome 2 Life
2020	Nam Ji-hyun	365: Repeat the Year

=== Best Actor in a Wednesday-Thursday Drama ===
Year	Winner	Drama
2018	So Ji-sub	My Secret Terrius
2019	Jung Hae-in	One Spring Night
2020	Kim Eung-soo	Kkondae Intern

=== Best Actress in a Wednesday-Thursday Drama ===
Year	Winner	Drama
2018	Kim Sun-ah	Children of Nobody
2019	Han Ji-min	One Spring Night
2019	Shin Se-kyung	Rookie Historian Goo Hae-ryung
2020	Im Soo-hyang	When I Was Most Beautiful

=== Best Actor in a Daily Drama ===
Year	Winner	Drama
2021	Cha Seo-won	The Second Husband
2023	Kim Yu-seok	Meant to Be

=== Best Actress in a Daily Drama ===
Year	Winner	Drama
2021	Uhm Hyun-kyung	The Second Husband
2023	Jang Seo-hee	Game of Witches

=== Best Actor in a Daily/One-Act Drama ===
Year	Winner	Drama
2022	Park Ho-san	Hunted
2024	Seo Jun-young	The Brave Yong Su-jeong

=== Best Actress in a Daily/One-Act Drama ===
Year	Winner	Drama
2022	Lee Seung-yeon	The Secret House
2024	Uhm Hyun-kyung	The Brave Yong Su-jeong
2024	Oh Seung-ah	The Third Marriage

== Excellence in Acting Awards ==
=== Best Actor ===
Year	Winner	Drama
1980	Kil Yong-woo	
1980	Park In-hwan	
1990	Park In-hwan	My Sister, Mong-sil
1991	Choi Soo-jong	
1994	Lee Jae-ryong	General Hospital
1996	Ahn Jae-wook	
1997	Cha In-pyo	You and I
2000	Ryu Si-won	Truth
2001	Jo Min-ki	Everyday with You, Sweet Bear
2001	Yoo Jun-sang	How Should I Be?
2003	Lee Seo-jin	Damo
2004	Kim Suk-hoon	Ode to the Han River
2004	Kim Sung-min	Lotus Flower Fairy
2005	Kang Ji-hwan	Be Strong, Geum-soon!
2006	Kim Seung-soo	Jumong
2006	Kim Yoon-seok	Love Me When You Can
2006	Oh Ji-ho	Couple or Trouble
2007	Gong Yoo	The 1st Shop of Coffee Prince
2007	Lee Joon-gi	Time Between Dog and Wolf
2008	Jo Min-ki	East of Eden
2008	Lee Dong-gun	Night After Night
2009	Choi Cheol-ho	Queen of Housewives
2009	Kim Nam-gil	Queen Seondeok
2010	Lee Min-ho	Personal Taste
2010	Park Si-hoo	Queen of Reversals

=== Best Actress ===
Year	Winner	Drama
1974	Park Won-sook	Narcissus
1984	Go Doo-shim	
1985	Choi Myung-gil	The Ume Tree in the Midst of the Snow
1991	Bae Jong-ok	
1993	Go Hyun-jung	My Mother's Sea
1994	Shin Eun-kyung	General Hospital
1995	Lee Seung-yeon	
1998	Park Won-sook	See and See Again
1999	Song Yun-ah	The Boss
2000	Choi Ji-woo	Mr. Duke
2001	Kim Hyun-joo	Her House
2003	So Yoo-jin	The Bean Chaff of My Life, Good Person
2004	Jung Hye-young	Phoenix
2004	Kim Min-sun	Ode to the Han River
2005	Han Ga-in	Super Rookie
2005	Jung Ryeo-won	My Lovely Sam Soon
2006	Han Ye-seul	Couple or Trouble
2007	Han Ji-min	Yi San
2007	Nam Sang-mi	Time Between Dog and Wolf
2008	Han Ji-hye	East of Eden
2008	Moon So-ri	My Life's Golden Age
2009	Go Na-eun	Assorted Gems
2009	Lee Hye-young	Queen of Housewives
2010	Lee So-yeon	Dong Yi
2010	Park Eun-hye	Pink Lipstick

=== Best Actor in a Miniseries ===
Year	Winner	Drama
2002	Yang Dong-geun	Ruler of Your Own World
2011	Kim Jaewon	Listen to My Heart
2012	Park Yoo-chun	Missing You
2013	Joo Won	7th Grade Civil Servant
2014	Kim Sang-joong	A New Leaf
2015	Park Seo-joon	Kill Me, Heal Me, She Was Pretty
2016	Seo In-guk	Shopping King Louie
2017	Shin Sung-rok	Man Who Dies to Live
2021	Lee Sang-yeob	On the Verge of Insanity
2022	Kim Young-dae	The Forbidden Marriage
2023	Bae In-hyuk	The Story of Park's Marriage Contract
2024	Lee Jong-won	Knight Flower
2024	Lee Dong-hwi	Chief Detective 1958

=== Best Actress in a Miniseries ===
Year	Winner	Drama
2002	Lee Na-young	Ruler of Your Own World
2011	Hwang Jung-eum	Listen to My Heart
2011	Lee Bo-young	Bravo, My Love!
2012	Lee Yoon-ji	The King 2 Hearts
2013	Shin Se-kyung	When a Man Falls in Love
2014	Choi Soo-young	My Spring Days
2015	Kang So-ra	Warm and Cozy
2016	Lee Sung-kyung	Weightlifting Fairy Kim Bok-joo
2017	Han Sun-hwa	Radiant Office
2021	Jang Young-nam	The Veil
2022	Park Ju-hyun	The Forbidden Marriage
2022	Lee Hye-ri	May I Help You?
2023	Park Gyu-young	A Good Day to Be a Dog
2024	Chae Soo-bin	When the Phone Rings

=== Best Actor in a Special Project Drama ===
Year	Winner	Drama
2012	Lee Sang-woo	Feast of the Gods, The King's Doctor
2013	Ji Chang-wook	Empress Ki
2014	Choi Jin-hyuk	Pride and Prejudice
2015	Son Chang-min	My Daughter, Geum Sa-wol
2016	Seo Ha-joon	Flowers of the Prison

=== Best Actress in a Special Project Drama ===
Year	Winner	Drama
2012	Son Dam-bi	Lights and Shadows
2013	Uee	Golden Rainbow
2014	Baek Jin-hee	Pride and Prejudice, Triangle
2015	Oh Hyun-kyung	4 Legendary Witches
2016	Jin Se-yeon	Flowers of the Prison

=== Best Actor in a Serial Drama ===
Year	Winner	Drama
2002	Ryu Si-won	Since We Met
2011	Ji Hyun-woo	A Thousand Kisses
2012	Jae Hee	May Queen
2013	Yeon Jung-hoon	Pots of Gold
2014	Lee Jang-woo	Rosy Lovers
2015	Park Yeong-gyu	Mom
2016	Son Ho-jun	Blow Breeze
2018	Lee Kyu-han	The Rich Son

=== Best Actress in a Serial Drama ===
Year	Winner	Drama
2002	Woo Hee-jin	Miss Mermaid
2011	Lee Yoo-ri	Twinkle Twinkle
2012	Seo Hyun-jin	Feast of the Gods, Here Comes Mr. Oh
2013	Hong Soo-hyun	A Little Love Never Hurts
2014	Kim Ji-young	Everybody Say Kimchi
2015	Cha Hwa-yeon	Mom
2016	Lim Ji-yeon	Blow Breeze
2018	Park Joon-geum	My Healing Love

=== Best Actor in a Weekend Drama ===
Year	Winner	Drama
2017	Jang Seung-jo	Money Flower
2018	Jung Sang-hoon	My Contracted Husband, Mr. Oh
2019	Ryu Soo-young	Love in Sadness

=== Best Actress in a Weekend Drama ===
Year	Winner	Drama
2017	Jang Hee-jin	You Are Too Much
2018	Jo Bo-ah	Goodbye to Goodbye
2019	Park Se-wan	Never Twice

=== Best Actor in a Soap Opera ===
Year	Winner	Drama
2017	Kang Kyung-joon	Sisters-in-Law

=== Best Actress in a Soap Opera ===
Year	Winner	Drama
2017	Song Seon-mi	Return of Fortunate Bok

=== Best Actor in a Monday-Tuesday Drama ===
Year	Winner	Drama
2017	Kim Seon-ho	Two Cops
2018	Woo Do-hwan	Tempted
2019	Oh Man-seok	Partners for Justice
2020	Lee Joon-hyuk	365: Repeat the Year

=== Best Actress in a Monday-Tuesday Drama ===
Year	Winner	Drama
2017	Chae Soo-bin	The Rebel
2018	Moon Ga-young	Tempted
2019	Park Se-young	Special Labor Inspector
2020	Nam Gyu-ri	Kairos

=== Best Actor in a Wednesday-Thursday Drama ===
Year	Winner	Drama
2018	Jang Ki-yong	Come and Hug Me
2019	Cha Eun-woo	Rookie Historian Goo Hae-ryung
2020	Im Joo-hwan	The Game: Towards Zero; The Spies Who Loved Me

=== Best Actress in a Wednesday-Thursday Drama ===
Year	Winner	Drama
2018	Jung In-sun	My Secret Terrius
2019	Kim Hye-yoon	Extraordinary You
2020	Kim Seul-gi	Find Me in Your Memory

=== Best Actor in a Short Drama ===
Year	Winner	Drama
2021	Jung Moon-sung	Moebius: The Veil

=== Best Actress in a Short Drama ===
Year	Winner	Drama
2021	Kim Hwan-hee	Here's My Plan

=== Best Actor in a Daily Drama ===
Year	Winner	Drama
2023	Lee Hyun-seok	Game of Witches

=== Best Actress in a Daily Drama ===
Year	Winner	Drama
2023	Jeon Hye-yeon	Meant to Be

=== Best Actor in a Daily/One Act Drama ===
Year	Winner	Drama
2022	Seo Ha-joon	The Secret House
2024	Moon Ji-hoo	The Third Marriage

=== Best Actress in a Daily/One Act Drama ===
Year	Winner	Drama
2022	Choi Soo-young	Fanletter Please
2024	Oh Se-young	The Third Marriage

== Best Supporting Awards ==
=== Best Supporting Actor/Actress in a Monday-Tuesday Drama ===
Year	Winner	Drama
2018	Kim Jae-kyung	Bad Papa
2019	Oh Dae-hwan	Special Labor Inspector

=== Best Supporting Actor/Actress in a Wednesday-Thursday Drama ===
Year	Winner	Drama
2018	Kang Ki-young	My Secret Terrius
2019	Lee Ji-hoon	Rookie Historian Goo Hae-ryung

=== Best Supporting Actor/Actress in a Weekend Drama ===
Year	Winner	Drama
2018	Jung Hye-young	Goodbye to Goodbye
2019	Jung Si-ah	The Golden Garden

=== Best Supporting Actor/Actress in a Serial Drama ===
Year	Winner	Drama
2018	Jeon No-min	Secrets and Lies

=== Best Supporting Actor/Actress ===
Year	Winner	Drama
2020	Lee Sung-wook	365: Repeat the Year
2020	Kim Sun-young	Kkondae Intern
2021	Kim Do-hyun	The Veil
2021	Jang Hye-jin	The Red Sleeve
2022	Lee Chang-hoon	Tracer
2022	Ye Soo-jung	Hunted
2023	Choi Young-woo	My Dearest
2023	Cha Chung-hwa	Kokdu: Season of Deity
2024	Jo Jae-yoon	Knight Flower & Black Out
2024	Kim Mi-kyung	Knight Flower & Black Out

== Golden Acting Awards ==
=== Golden Acting Award, Actor ===
Year	Winner	Category	Drama
2007	Choi Min-soo	Historical Drama	The Legend
2007	Lee Soon-jae	Historical Drama	Yi San
2007	Jang Hyuk	Miniseries	Thank You
2007	Lee Sun-kyun	Miniseries	Behind the White Tower
2007	Kim Byung-ki	Veteran Actor	Ahyeon-dong Madam
2008	Ji Sung	Miniseries	New Heart
2008	Park Geun-hyung	Serial Drama	Woman of Matchless Beauty, Park Jung-geum, East of Eden
2008	Park Chul-min	Supporting Actor	New Heart, Beethoven Virus
2008	Yoo Dong-geun	Veteran Actor	East of Eden
2009	Kim Chang-wan	Miniseries	Queen of Housewives, Triple
2009	Ahn Gil-kang	Supporting Actor	Queen Seondeok
2009	Kang Nam-gil	Veteran Actor	Creating Destiny
2010	Park Sang-won	Serial Drama	Golden Fish
2010	Kim Yu-seok	Supporting Actor	Dong Yi
2010	Im Chae-moo	Veteran Actor	Enjoy Life
2011	Jeong Bo-seok	Miniseries	Listen to My Heart, Stormy Lovers
2011	Kil Yong-woo	Serial Drama	Twinkle Twinkle
2012	Jun Kwang-ryul	—N/a	Lights and Shadows, Missing You
2012	Lee Deok-hwa	—N/a	May Queen
2013	Cho Jae-hyun	—N/a	Scandal: A Shocking and Wrongful Incident
2013	Jeong Bo-seok	—N/a	A Hundred Year Legacy
2013	Kim Sang-joong	—N/a	Golden Rainbow
2014	Ahn Nae-sang	—N/a	Jang Bo-ri is Here!
2014	Choi Min-soo	—N/a	Pride and Prejudice
2016	Kim Eui-sung	Miniseries	W – Two World
2016	Jung Joon-ho	Special Project Drama	Flowers of the Prison
2016	Lee Pil-mo	Serial Drama	Happy Home
2017	Ahn Gil-kang	Weekend Drama	Bad Thief, Good Thief
2017	Oh Jung-se	Miniseries	Missing 9
2017	Ahn Nae-sang	Soap Opera	Golden Pouch
2017	Jeong Bo-seok	Monday-Tuesday Drama	The King in Love
2018	Huh Joon-ho	Monday-Tuesday Drama	Come and Hug Me
2021	Lee Deok-hwa	Lifetime Achievement Award	The Red Sleeve

=== Golden Acting Award, Actress ===
Year	Winner	Category	Drama
2007	Choi Myung-gil	Serial Drama	By My Side
2007	Lee Yoon-ji	Serial Drama	By My Side
2007	Park Won-sook	Veteran Actress	Winter Bird
2008	Kim Min-jung	Miniseries	New Heart
2008	Hong Eun-hee	Serial Drama	Don't Be Swayed
2008	Shin Eun-jung	Supporting Actress	East of Eden
2008	Song Ok-sook	Veteran Actress	Beethoven Virus
2009	Na Young-hee	Miniseries	Queen of Reversals
2009	Jung Hye-sun	Serial Drama	Assorted Gems
2009	Kim Young-ok	Serial Drama	Assorted Gems
2009	Seo Young-hee	Supporting Actress	Queen Seondeok
2009	Jung Ae-ri	Veteran Actress	Good Job, Good Job, Can't Stop Now
2010	Kim Bo-yeon	Serial Drama	Golden Fish
2010	Ha Yoo-mi	Supporting Actress	Queen of Reversals
2010	Park Jung-soo	Veteran Actress	Queen of Reversals, Enjoy Life
2011	Bae Jong-ok	Miniseries	Bravo, My Love!
2011	Cha Hwa-yeon	Serial Drama	A Thousand Kisses
2012	Jeon In-hwa	—N/a	Feast of the Gods
2012	Yang Mi-kyung	—N/a	Moon Embracing the Sun, May Queen
2013	Cha Hwa-yeon	—N/a	A Little Love Never Hurts
2013	Kim Bo-yeon	—N/a	Princess Aurora
2013	Lee Hye-sook	—N/a	Pots of Gold
2014	Kim Hye-ok	—N/a	Jang Bo-ri is Here!
2014	Lee Mi-sook	—N/a	Miss Korea, Rosy Lovers
2016	Im Se-mi	Miniseries	Shopping King Louie
2016	Lee Hwi-hyang	Special Project Drama	Marriage Contract
2016	Kim Ji-ho	Serial Drama	Happy Home
2017	Shin Dong-mi	Weekend Drama	Father, I'll Take Care of You
2017	Jang Shin-young	Miniseries	Radiant Office
2017	Kim Seon-kyung	Miniseries	The Emperor: Owner of the Mask
2017	Song Ok-sook	Soap Opera	Person Who Gives Happiness
2017	Seo Yi-sook	Monday-Tuesday Drama	The Rebel
2018	Kang Boo-ja	Weekend drama	A Pledge to God
2020	Shim Yi-young	—N/a	My Wonderful Life

== Special Acting Awards ==
Year	Winner	Category	Drama
1994	Dokgo Young-jae	—N/a	My Mother's Sea
1999	Park Geun-hyung	—N/a	
2001	Kim Yong-gun	—N/a	
2001	Go Doo-shim	—N/a	
2002	Han Hye-sook	—N/a	Miss Mermaid
2002	Jung Young-sook	—N/a	Miss Mermaid
2002	Park Geun-hyung	—N/a	Miss Mermaid
2002	Ensemble cast (29 actors)	—N/a	Country Diaries
2003	Cho Jae-hyun	—N/a	Snowman, Damo
2003	Im Hyun-sik	—N/a	Dae Jang Geum
2003	Bae Jong-ok	—N/a	While You Were Dreaming
2003	Yang Mi-kyung	—N/a	Dae Jang Geum
2004	Byun Jung-soo	—N/a	The Woman Who Wants to Marry
2004	Sa Mi-ja	—N/a	Lotus Flower Fairy
2005	Lee Deok-hwa	—N/a	5th Republic
2005	Son Chang-min	—N/a	Shin Don
2006	Huh Joon-ho	Historical Drama	Jumong
2006	Oh Yeon-soo	Historical Drama	Jumong
2006	Gong Yoo	Miniseries	One Fine Day
2006	Sung Yu-ri	Miniseries	One Fine Day
2006	Byun Woo-min	Serial Drama	Love Me When You Can
2006	Hong Kyung-min	Serial Drama	Love Can't Wait
2006	Lee Young-ah	Serial Drama	Love Can't Wait
2006	Kim Jin-geun	One-Act Drama	
2006	Seo Young-hee	One-Act Drama	그집엔 누가사나요?
2006	Lee Kye-in	Veteran Actor/Actress	Jumong
2006	Kim Ja-ok	Veteran Actor/Actress	My Beloved Sister
2006	Kim Hye-ok	Veteran Actor/Actress	Over the Rainbow
2011	Kim Young-ae	—N/a	Royal Family
2011	Yoon Tae-young	—N/a	Midnight Hospital
2014	Byun Hee-bong	One-Act Drama	Lump in My Life

== Newcomer Awards ==
=== Best New Actor ===
Year	Winner	Drama
1980	Kil Yong-woo	
1988	Park Sang-won	Human Market
1993	Han Suk-kyu	Pilot, Sons and Daughters
1994	Ahn Jae-wook	
1998	Yu Oh-seong	Aim for Tomorrow
1999	Kim Sang-kyung	
1999	Yoon Tae-young	The Boss
2000	Go Soo	Mothers and Sisters
2000	Kim Myung-min	Some Like It Hot
2001	Ji Sung	The Rules of Marriage
2001	Lee Seo-jin	Her House
2002	Kim Jaewon	Romance
2002	Kim Sung-min	Miss Mermaid
2003	Gang Dong-won	Something About 1%
2003	Kim Min-jun	Damo
2004	Eric Mun	Phoenix
2004	Hyun Bin	Ireland
2005	Daniel Henney	My Lovely Sam Soon
2005	Kang Ji-hwan	Be Strong, Geum-soon!
2005	Lee Min-ki	Be Strong, Geum-soon!
2006	Ju Ji-hoon	Princess Hours
2006	Won Ki-joon	Jumong
2007	Han Sang-jin	Behind the White Tower, Yi San
2007	Kim Min-sung	Ahyeon-dong Madam
2008	Park Hae-jin	East of Eden
2008	Jang Keun-suk	Beethoven Virus
2009	Lee Seung-hyo	Queen Seondeok
2009	Yoo Seung-ho	Queen Seondeok
2010	Lee Sang-yoon	Home Sweet Home
2010	Lee Tae-sung	Playful Kiss
2011	Lee Gi-kwang	My Princess
2011	Park Yoo-chun	Miss Ripley
2011	Park Yoon-jae	Indomitable Daughters-in-Law
2012	Kim Jae-joong	Dr. Jin
2012	Lee Jang-woo	Here Comes Mr. Oh, I Do, I Do
2013	Lee Sang-yeob	A Little Love Never Hurts
2013	Oh Chang-seok	Princess Aurora
2014	Choi Tae-joon	Mother's Garden
2014	Yim Si-wan	Triangle
2015	Kang Eun-tak	Apgujeong Midnight Sun
2015	Yoon Hyun-min	My Daughter, Geum Sa-wol
2015	Lee Soo-hyuk	Scholar Who Walks the Night
2016	Nam Joo-hyuk	Weightlifting Fairy Kim Bok-joo
2016	Ryu Jun-yeol	Lucky Romance
2017	Kim Jung-hyun	The Rebel
2017	Kim Seon-ho	Two Cops
2018	Kim Kyung-nam	Come and Hug Me
2018	Lee Jun-young	Goodbye to Goodbye
2019	Lee Jae-wook	Extraordinary You
2019	Rowoon	Extraordinary You
2020	Ahn Bo-hyun	Kairos
2021	Kang Hoon	The Red Sleeve
2022	Lee Jong-won	The Golden Spoon
2023	Kim Mu-jun	My Dearest
2023	Kim Yoon-woo	My Dearest
2024	Heo Nam-jun	When the Phone Rings
2024	Lee Ga-sub	Black out

=== Best New Actress ===
Year	Winner	Drama
1982	Lee Hye-sook	Women's History: Jang Hui-bin
1984	Hwang Shin-hye	Father and Son
1988	Kyeon Mi-ri	Queen Inhyeon
1994	Shim Eun-ha	The Last Match, M
1996	Lee Min-young	
1997	Kim Ji-young	You and I
1999	Kim Hye-sun	
2000	Ha Ji-won	Secret
2001	So Yoo-jin	Delicious Proposal
2001	Son Ye-jin	Delicious Proposal
2002	Im Ji-eun	Golden Wagon
2002	Kim Min-sun	I Love You, Hyun-jung
2003	Jeong Da-bin	Cats on the Roof
2003	Soo Ae	Love Letter, Merry Go Round
2004	Kim Min-jung	Ireland
2004	Lee Da-hae	Lotus Flower Fairy
2005	Seo Ji-hye	Shin Don
2006	Nam Sang-mi	Sweet Spy
2006	Yoon Eun-hye	Princess Hours
2007	Lee Ha-na	Merry Mary
2007	Lee Ji-ah	The Legend
2008	Lee So-yeon	My Life's Golden Age
2008	Lee Yeon-hee	East of Eden
2009	Lim Ju-eun	Soul
2009	Seo Woo	Tamra, the Island
2010	Jo Yoon-hee	Golden Fish
2010	Park Ha-sun	Dong Yi
2011	Hyomin	Gyebaek
2011	Lee Ha-nui	Indomitable Daughters-in-Law
2011	Seo Hyun-jin	The Duo
2012	Kim So-eun	The King's Doctor
2012	Oh Yeon-seo	Here Comes Mr. Oh
2013	Baek Jin-hee	Empress Ki
2013	Jeon So-min	Princess Aurora
2014	Han Sun-hwa	Rosy Lovers
2014	Ko Sung-hee	Miss Korea, The Night Watchman's Journal
2015	Park Ha-na	Apgujeong Midnight Sun
2015	Lee Sung-kyung	Queen's Flower
2015	Lee Yu-bi	Scholar Who Walks the Night
2016	Nam Ji-hyun	Shopping King Louie
2016	Jo Bo-ah	Monster
2017	Lee Sun-bin	Missing 9
2017	Seohyun	Bad Thief, Good Thief
2018	Oh Seung-ah	Secrets and Lies
2018	Lee Seol	Less Than Evil
2019	Kim Hye-yoon	Extraordinary You
2020	Kim Hye-jun	Chip In
2021	Kim Ji-eun	The Veil
2022	Yeonwoo	The Golden Spoon
2022	Kim Min-ju	The Forbidden Marriage
2023	Joo Hyun-young	The Story of Park's Marriage Contract
2023	Park Jeong-yeon	My Dearest
2024	Chae Won-bin	Doubt

== Youth Awards ==
=== Best Young Actor ===
Year	Winner	Drama
2007	Park Ji-bin	Yi San
2008	Park Gun-tae	East of Eden
2008	Shin Dong-woo	East of Eden
2009	Lee Hyung-suk	Enjoy Life
2010	Lee Hyung-suk	Dong Yi
2011	Yang Han-yeol	The Greatest Love
2012	Yeo Jin-goo	Moon Embracing the Sun, Missing You
2013	Chun Bo-geun	The Queen's Classroom
2014	Yoon Chan-young	Mama
2015	Yang Han-yeol	She Was Pretty
2017	Lee Ro-woon	The Rebel
2017	Nam Da-reum	The King in Love
2018	Kim Gun-woo	My Secret Terrius
2018	Wang Seok-hyun	A Pledge to God

=== Best Young Actress ===
Year	Winner	Drama
2007	Seo Shin-ae	Thank You
2008	Nam Ji-hyun	East of Eden
2009	Jeon Min-seo	Good Job, Good Job
2009	Nam Ji-hyun	Queen Seondeok
2010	Kim You-jung	Dong Yi, Flames of Desire
2011	Kim Yoo-bin	Bravo, My Love!
2012	Kim So-hyun	Moon Embracing the Sun, Missing You
2012	Kim You-jung	Moon Embracing the Sun, May Queen
2013	Kim Hyang-gi	The Queen's Classroom
2013	Kim Sae-ron	The Queen's Classroom
2013	Lee Young-yoo	The Queen's Classroom
2013	Seo Shin-ae	The Queen's Classroom
2014	Kim Ji-young	Jang Bo-ri is Here!
2015	Kal So-won	My Daughter, Geum Sa-wol, Glamorous Temptation
2016	Gu Geon-min	Working Mom Parenting Daddy
2016	Jung Da-bin	Flowers of the Prison
2018	Ok Ye-rin	My Secret Terrius
2018	Shin Eun-soo	Bad Papa
2018	Ryu Han-bi	Come and Hug Me
2018	Shin Bi	Goodbye to Goodbye
2018	Lee Na-yoon	Hold Me Tight
2018	Jo Ye-rin	Hide and Seek
2019	Lee Soo-ah	Welcome 2 Life

== Best Character Award ==
Year	Winner	Drama
2022	Choi Won-young	The Golden Spoon

=== Best Villain Award ===
Year	Winner	Drama
2017	Choi Tae-joon	Missing 9

=== Fighting Spirit Acting Award ===
Year	Winner	Drama
2017	Kim Myung-soo	The Emperor: Owner of the Mask

=== Comic Character Award ===
Year	Winner	Drama
2017	Jung Kyung-ho	Missing 9

== PD Award ==
Year	Winner	Drama
2006	Chun Jung-myung	What's Up Fox
2006	Ji Hyun-woo	Over the Rainbow
2006	Jung Ryeo-won	Which Star Are You From
2006	Kim Ok-vin	Over the Rainbow
2007	Kim Chang-wan	The 1st Shop of Coffee Prince, Behind the White Tower
2008	Lee Soon-jae	Beethoven Virus
2008	Yeon Jung-hoon	East of Eden
2009	Shin Goo	Queen Seondeok
2010	Chae Jung-an	Queen of Reversals
2010	Lee Tae-gon	Golden Fish
2010	Oh Kyung-hoon (director)	Home Sweet Home
2011	Choi Jong-hwan	Gyebaek, The Duo
2011	Kim Jung-tae	Can't Lose, Miss Ripley
2011	Song Ji-hyo	Gyebaek
2012	Lee Sung-min	Golden Time
2013	Ha Ji-won	Empress Ki
2014	Lee Yoo-ri	Jang Bo-ri is Here!
2015	Hwang Jung-eum	Kill Me, Heal Me, She Was Pretty

== Writer of the Year ==
Year	Winner	Drama
2002	Bae Yoo-mi	Romance
2002	Im Sung-han	Miss Mermaid
2002	Lee Jung-soo	시사
2003	Jung Hyun-soo	Damo
2003	Kim Young-hyun	Dae Jang Geum
2003	Park Ji-hyun	While You Were Dreaming
2005	Kim Joon-ah	I Want to Meet You at Least Once
2005	Lee Ah-mi	PD Notebook
2005	Lee Jung-sun	Be Strong, Geum-soon!
2006	Choi Wan-kyu, Jung Hyun-soo	Jumong
2007	Han Sook-ja	MBC Special
2007	Kim Yi-young	Yi San
2008	Hong Jin-ah, Hong Ja-ram	Beethoven Virus
2008	Kim Eun-hee	MBC Special
2008	Na Yeon-sook	East of Eden
2009	Kim Young-hyun, Park Sang-yeon	Queen Seondeok
2009	Noh Kyung-hee	Tears of the Arctic
2009	Park Ji-eun	Queen of Housewives
2010	Go Hye-rim	Tears of the Amazon
2010	Jo Eun-jung	Golden Fish
2010	Park Hyun-joo	Enjoy Life
2011	Bae Yoo-mi	Twinkle Twinkle
2011	Hong Mi-ran, Hong Jung-eun	The Greatest Love
2012	Jin Soo-wan	Moon Embracing the Sun
2012	Son Young-mok	May Queen
2013	Gu Hyun-sook	A Hundred Year Legacy
2013	Jang Young-chul, Jung Kyung-soon	Empress Ki
2014	Kim Soon-ok	Jang Bo-ri is Here!
2014	Yoo Yoon-kyung	Mama
2015	Jo Sung-hee	She Was Pretty
2015	Ha Chung-ok	Make a Woman Cry
2016	Song Jae-jung	W – Two World
2017	Hwang Jin-young	The Rebel
2018	Oh Ji-young	My Secret Terrius
2019	Kim Ban-di	Special Labor Inspector
2021	Jung Hae-ri	The Red Sleeve

== Actor of the Year ==
Year	Winner	Drama
2018	Huh Joon-ho	Come and Hug Me

== Popularity Awards ==
=== Popularity Award, Actor ===
Year	Winner	Drama
1997	Ahn Jae-wook	Star in My Heart
1999	Kam Woo-sung	
2002	Kim Jaewon	Romance
2002	Yoo Jun-sang	Fox and Cotton Candy
2003	Kim Rae-won	Cats on the Roof
2004	Eric Mun	Phoenix
2005	Hyun Bin	My Lovely Sam Soon
2006	Oh Ji-ho	Couple or Trouble
2007	Bae Yong-joon	The Legend
2008	Song Seung-heon	East of Eden
2009	Lee Joon-gi	Hero
2010	Kim Hyun-joong	Playful Kiss
2011	Kim Jaewon	Listen to My Heart
2012	Kim Soo-hyun	Moon Embracing the Sun
2013	Lee Seung-gi	Gu Family Book
2014	Shin Ha-kyun	Mr. Back
2015	Park Seo-joon	Kill Me, Heal Me, She Was Pretty
2016	—N/a	—N/a
2017	Kim Myung-soo	The Emperor: Owner of the Mask

=== Popularity Award, Actress ===
Year	Winner	Drama
1998	Kim Hee-sun	
2002	Byun Jung-soo	Man in Crisis
2002	Gong Hyo-jin	Ruler of Your Own World
2003	Ha Ji-won	Damo
2004	Lee Na-young	Ireland
2005	Kim Sun-a	My Lovely Sam Soon
2006	Han Ye-seul	Couple or Trouble
2007	Lee Ji-ah	The Legend
2008	Lee Yeon-hee	East of Eden
2009	Seo Woo	Tamra, the Island
2010	Han Hyo-joo	Dong Yi
2011	Gong Hyo-jin	The Greatest Love
2012	Yoon Eun-hye	Missing You
2013	Ha Ji-won	Empress Ki
2014	Jang Na-ra	Fated to Love You, Mr. Back
2015	Hwang Jung-eum	Kill Me, Heal Me, She Was Pretty
2016	—N/a	—N/a
2017	Kim So-hyun	The Emperor: Owner of the Mask

=== Best Couple Award ===
Year	Winner	Drama
1997	Ahn Jae-wook and Choi Jin-sil	Star in My Heart
1998	Jeong Bo-seok and Kim Ji-soo	See and See Again
2002	Kim Sung-min and Jang Seo-hee	Miss Mermaid
2003	Lee Seo-jin and Ha Ji-won	Damo
2004	Lee Seo-jin and Lee Eun-ju	Phoenix
2005	Hyun Bin and Kim Sun-a	My Lovely Sam Soon
2006	Oh Ji-ho and Han Ye-seul	Couple or Trouble
2007	Bae Yong-joon and Lee Ji-ah	The Legend
2008	Song Seung-heon and Lee Yeon-hee	East of Eden
2009	Kim Nam-gil and Lee Yo-won	Queen Seondeok
2010	Lee Sun-kyun and Gong Hyo-jin	Pasta
2011	Cha Seung-won and Gong Hyo-jin	The Greatest Love
2012	Lee Joon-gi and Shin Min-a	Arang and the Magistrate
2013	Lee Seung-gi and Bae Suzy	Gu Family Book
2014	Jang Hyuk and Jang Na-ra	Fated to Love You
2015	Ji Sung and Park Seo-joon	Kill Me, Heal Me
2016	Lee Jong-suk and Han Hyo-joo	W – Two World
2017	—N/a	—N/a
2018	Jang Ki-yong and Jin Ki-joo	Come and Hug Me
2019	Cha Eun-woo and Shin Se-kyung	Rookie Historian Goo Hae-ryung
2020	Kim Dong-wook and Moon Ga-young	Find Me in Your Memory
2021	Lee Jun-ho and Lee Se-young	The Red Sleeve
2022	Lee Jong-suk and Im Yoon-ah	Big Mouth
2023	Namkoong Min and Ahn Eun-jin	My Dearest
2024	Yoo Yeon-seok and Chae Soo-bin	When the Phone Rings

=== Viewer's Favorite Drama of the Year ===
Year	Winner
2007	The Legend
2008	Beethoven Virus
2009	Queen Seondeok
2010	Dong Yi

=== Favorite Actor/Actress of the Year ===
Year	Category	Winner	Drama
2000	Viewers' Choice (Character Actor/Actress)	Im Hyun-sik	Hur Jun
2000	Viewers' Choice (Character Actor/Actress)	Park Sang-myun	The Boss
2000	Viewers' Choice (Character Actor/Actress)	Kim So-yeon	All About Eve
2000	Viewers' Choice (Character Actor/Actress)	Park Sun-young	Truth
2000	Journalists' Choice	Jun Kwang-ryul	Hur Jun
2000	Journalists' Choice	Hwang Soo-jung	Hur Jun
2002	Viewers' Choice	Yang Dong-geun	Ruler of Your Own World
2002	Viewers' Choice	Jang Seo-hee	Miss Mermaid
2002	Journalists' Choice	Yang Dong-geun	Ruler of Your Own World
2002	Journalists' Choice	Jang Seo-hee	Miss Mermaid

=== Hallyu Star Award ===
Year	Winner	Drama
2012	Yoon Eun-hye	Missing You

== Best TV Host / Special Award for TV MC ==
Year	Winner	Program
2002	Park Soo-hong	Time Machine
2002	Sohn Suk-hee	100-Minute Debate
2003	Lee Jae-yong	Very Special Morning, In Search of Delicious TV
2004	Kim Sung-joo	Apple Tree
2004	Kim Kwang-min, Lee Hyun-woo	수요예술무대
2005	Park Hye-jin	화제집중
2005	Sung Dong-il	정보토크 팔방미인
2006	Shin Dong-ho	Live Today
2007	Kim Sung-hwan	해피 실버 고향은 지금
2007	Im Ye-jin	Good Day

== Best TV Voice Actor/Actress ==
Year	Winner	Program
2002	Park Ji-hoon	
2005	Choi Seong-woo	CSI: Crime Scene Investigation
2005	Lee Jong-hyuk	CSI: Crime Scene Investigation
2006	Kim Youngsun	CSI: Crime Scene Investigation
2006	Yoon Seong-hye	CSI: Crime Scene Investigation
2007	Choi Won-hyeong	CSI: NY
2007	Eom Hyeon-jeong	CSI: Miami
2008	Choi Yoon-young	CSI: Crime Scene Investigation
2008	Kim Ho-seong	CSI: Miami
2009	Sung Sun-nyeo	Zero
2009	Choi Han	CSI: Crime Scene Investigation
2010	Sin Seong-ho	
2010	Song Joon-seok	
2011	Bak Seon-yeong	
2012	Jeon Soo-bin	CSI: Miami (season 10)
2015	Jeong Jae-heon	
2016	Choi Soo-jin	

== Special Award in TV ==
Year	Winner	Notes
2003	Jung Eun-young	Reporter, "Very Special Briefing" in Very Special Morning
2005	Lee Sang-eun	Reporter, Very Special Morning, 화제집중
2005	Moon Hye-jung	Reporter, Very Special Morning, TV속의 TV
2006	Han Sun-jung	Writer, W, MBC Special
2006	Kim Ji-yeon	Reporter, Live This Morning
2006	Kim Yong-pil	Reporter, Live This Morning
2007	Jung In	Producer
2008	Lee Jae-gyu	Director, Beethoven Virus
2008	Lee Jae-yong	Announcer
2009	Kim Sung-shil	Martial arts director, Queen Seondeok
2009	Oh Sang-jin	Announcer
2010	Moon Ji-ae	Announcer, Zero
2010	Park Jin-woo	Reporter, Live This Morning

== Family Award ==
Year	Winner
2005	Be Strong, Geum-soon!
2006	My Beloved Sister
2007	Kimcheed Radish Cubes
2008	I Love You, Don't Cry
2009	Enjoy Life
2010	Gloria

== Radio ==
=== Top Excellence Award in Radio ===
Year	Winner	Program
2000	Lee Taek-rim	Enjoy at 2:00 in the Afternoon
2002	Yoon Do-hyun	2 o'clock Date
2003	Kang Seok, Kim Hye-young	싱글벙글쇼
2004	Bae Chul-soo	Bae Cheol-soo's Music Camp
2005	Ock Joo-hyun	On a Starry Night
2006	Jung Sun-hee	
2007	Choi Yoo-ra	Now Is the Era of Radio
2008	Lee Moon-sae	This Is Lee Moon-sae in the Morning
2009	Sohn Suk-hee	Sohn Suk-hee's Focus
2010	Jo Young-nam	Now Is the Era of Radio

=== Excellence Award in Radio ===
Year	Winner	Program
2002	Kim Won-hee	Hopeful Music at Noon
2002	Ock Joo-hyun	On a Starry Night
2003	Choi Yang-rak	Choi Yang-rak's Fun Radio
2003	Noh Sa-yeon	Enjoy at 2:00 in the Afternoon
2004	Jeon Yu-seong	Now Is the Era of Radio
2004	Kim Mi-hwa	세계는 그리고 우리는
2005	Ji Sang-ryeol	Ji Sang-ryeol and Noh Sa-yeon's Hooray for 2 p.m.
2005	Kim Sung-joo	Good Morning FM
2005	Yoon Jong-shin	2 o'clock Date
2006	Jo Jung-rin	
2006	Park Kyung-lim	
2006	Tablo	
2007	Park Jung-ah	On a Starry Night
2007	Sung Si-kyung	Blue Nights with Sung Si-kyung
2008	Kangin	Kangin's Good Friends
2008	Kang Seok-woo	Women's Era
2009	Park Myeong-su	Park Myeong-su's 2 o'clock Date
2009	Shindong	Shindong and Kim Shin-young's ShimShimTapa
2010	Bae Chil-soo	Bae Han-sung and Bae Chil-soo's Fight
2010	Hyun Young	Jung-oh's Request Line

=== Best Newcomer in Radio ===
Year	Winner	Program
2007	Jo Young-nam	Now Is the Era of Radio
2008	Kim Shin-young	ShimShimTapa
2009	Kim Tae-yeon	Taeyeon's Good Friends
2010	Noh Hong-chul	Noh Hong-chul's Good Friends

=== Best Writer in Radio ===
Year	Winner	Program
2003	Noh Kyung-hee	희로애락
2003	Oh Kyung-ah	Now Is the Era of Radio
2007	Kim Sung	싱글벙글 쇼
2008	Kim Shin-wook	언중유쾌
2009	Ryu Mi-na	Now Is the Era of Radio
2010	Park Chang-seob	Sohn Suk-hee's Focus

=== Best Voice Actor/Actress in Radio ===
Year	Winner	Program
2006	Ahn Ji-hwan	2 o'clock Date
2012	Choi Sang-ki	Bae Han-sung's Classics

=== Special Award in Radio ===
Year	Winner	Notes
2002	Im Jin-mo	Pop music critic
2003	Park Mi-ra	Reporter, Sohn Suk-hee's Focus
2005	Bae Chil-soo	Host, Choi Yang-rak's Fun Radio
2005	Jung Mi-seon	Writer, This Is Lee Moon-sae in the Morning
2005	Kim Mi-jin	Host, Choi Yang-rak's Fun Radio
2005	Kim Min-jung	Reporter, Sohn Suk-hee's Focus
2005	Lee Jae-sung	Host, Radio Dongui Bogam with Lee Jae-sung
2005	Park Young-hwa	Voice actor, Turbulent Fifties
2006	Go Kyeong-bong	Reporter, 변창립의 세상 속으로
2006	Oh Ji-hye	Writer, Sohn Suk-hee's Focus
2006	Oh Soo-seok	Host, 문화야 놀자
2006	Rhee Ji-yeong	
2006	Shin Hae-chul	Host, Shin Hae-chul's Ghost Nation
2007	Kim You-jung	Reporter, Sohn Suk-hee's Focus
2007	Yoon Young-wook	Editorial writer, 논설위원, 세계는 그리고 우리는
2008	Yoo Jin	세계는 그리고 우리는
2008	Kim Kang-san	Voice actor, Turbulent Fifties
2009	Jang Jin	DJ, Radio Book Club
2009	Choi Soo-yeon	Reporter, Sohn Suk-hee's Focus
2009	Won Ho-seob	Voice actor, Turbulent Fifties
2010	Lee Joo-yeon	Announcer, Lee Joo-yeon's Movie Music
2010	Kim Yu-ri	Reporter, 2 o'clock Date

== Achievement Award ==
Year	Winner	Notes
2002	Jung Ae-ran	Country Diaries
2003	Jeon In-taek	Actor
2003	Lee Kyung-ho	연기자 노조위원장
2004	Choi Jong-soo	Director, Ode to the Han River
2005	Jung Ae-ran	Actress
2005	주식회사 iMBC	Radio
2006	Jo So-hye	Writer
2007	Jung Han-heon	MBC Talent Department
2007	CG team	The Legend
2007	Kim Hye-kyung	Designer, Standard FM and Golden Mau
2008	Choi Jin-sil	Last Scandal
2009	Choi Jae-ho	전 탤랜터실장
2009	Heo Gu-yeon	Baseball commentator
2009	Lee Seok-young	Writer, Turbulent Fifties
2009	Park Jung-ran	Writer, I Love You, Don't Cry
2010	Jung Hye-sun	Home Sweet Home
2010	Na Moon-hee	It's Me, Grandma
2010	Sung Kyung-seob	News Touch
2011	Kang Boo-ja	Indomitable Daughters-in-Law
2012	Jo Kyung-hwan	
2013	Han Jin-hee	Pots of Gold
2013	Park Won-sook	A Hundred Year Legacy
2014	Kim Ja-ok	—N/a

== Ceremonies ==
Edition
2006 MBC Drama Awards
2007 MBC Drama Awards
2008 MBC Drama Awards
2009 MBC Drama Awards
2010 MBC Drama Awards
2011 MBC Drama Awards
2012 MBC Drama Awards
2013 MBC Drama Awards
2014 MBC Drama Awards
2015 MBC Drama Awards
2016 MBC Drama Awards
2017 MBC Drama Awards
2018 MBC Drama Awards
2019 MBC Drama Awards
2020 MBC Drama Awards
2021 MBC Drama Awards
2022 MBC Drama Awards
2023 MBC Drama Awards
2024 MBC Drama Awards
2025 MBC Drama Awards

== See also ==
- List of Asian television awards
- KBS Drama Awards
- SBS Drama Awards
