= 4th Korea Drama Awards =

2011 edition of award ceremony

- Date: October 2, 2011
- Site: Kyungnam Culture and Arts Center, Jinju, South Gyeongsang Province
- Hosted by: Son Hoyoung; Choi Song-hyun

The 4th Korea Drama Awards is an awards ceremony for excellence in television in South Korea. It was held at the Kyungnam Culture and Arts Center in Jinju, South Gyeongsang Province on October 2, 2011 and hosted by Son Hoyoung and Choi Song-hyun. The nominees were chosen from Korean dramas that aired from October 2010 to September 2011.

== Nominations and winners ==
(Winners denoted in bold)

Grand Prize (Daesang)
**Secret Garden (SBS)**; Sign (SBS); Sungkyunkwan Scandal (KBS2); The Greatest Love (MBC); Twinkle Twinkle (MBC)
Best Production Director	Best Screenplay
**Kim Won-seok** - **Sungkyunkwan Scandal**; Jin Hyuk - City Hunter; Kim Do-hoon - Royal Family; Kim Sang-ho - Listen to My Heart; Shin Woo-chul - Secret Garden	**Kim Eun-sook** - **Secret Garden**; Hong Mi-ran, Hong Jung-eun - The Greatest Love; Jo Nam-kook - Definitely Neighbors; Kim Woon-kyung - The Duo; Park Hye-ryun - Dream High
Best Actor	Best Actress
**Lee Min-ho** - **City Hunter**; Cha Seung-won - The Greatest Love; Kim Jaewon - Listen to My Heart; Kwon Sang-woo - Daemul; Lee Beom-soo - Giant	**Yum Jung-ah** - **Royal Family**; Gong Hyo-jin - The Greatest Love; Ha Ji-won - Secret Garden; Kim Hyun-joo - Twinkle Twinkle; Park Min-young - City Hunter, Sungkyunkwan Scandal
Best Supporting Actor	Best Supporting Actress
**Joo Sang-wook** - **Giant**, **The Thorn Birds**; Kim Jung-tae - Miss Ripley; Kim Sang-ho - City Hunter, Twinkle Twinkle; Kim Sung-oh - Giant, Midas, Secret Garden; Um Ki-joon - Dream High, Scent of a Woman	**Lee Yoo-ri** - **Twinkle Twinkle**; Ha Yoo-mi - Queen of Reversals; Lee Yoon-ji - Dream High; Park Joon-geum - Secret Garden; Yoo In-na - Secret Garden, The Greatest Love
Best New Actor	Best New Actress
**Kim Soo-hyun** - **Dream High**; Ji Chang-wook - Smile Again; Kang Dong-ho - Twinkle Twinkle; Park Yoo-chun - Miss Ripley, Sungkyunkwan Scandal; Song Joong-ki - Sungkyunkwan Scandal	**Im Soo-hyang** - **New Tales of Gisaeng**; Bae Suzy - Dream High; Hwang Sun-hee - City Hunter, Sign; Kim Min-seo - Baby Faced Beauty, Sungkyunkwan Scandal; Seo Hyun-jin - The Duo
Most Popular Actor	Hallyu Star Award
**Kim Soo-hyun** - **Dream High**	**Lee Min-ho** - **City Hunter**
Special Award for Cable TV	Best Original Soundtrack
**Jeon Hye-bin** - **Yaksha (OCN)**; Jo Dong-hyuk - Yaksha; Jo Yeo-jeong - I Need Romance; Kim Hyun-sook - Rude Miss Young-ae - Season 8; Ryu Deok-hwan - Quiz of God Season 2	**"Don't Forget Me" (Huh Gak)** - **The Greatest Love**
