= Kim Jaewon =

South Korean actor (born 1981)

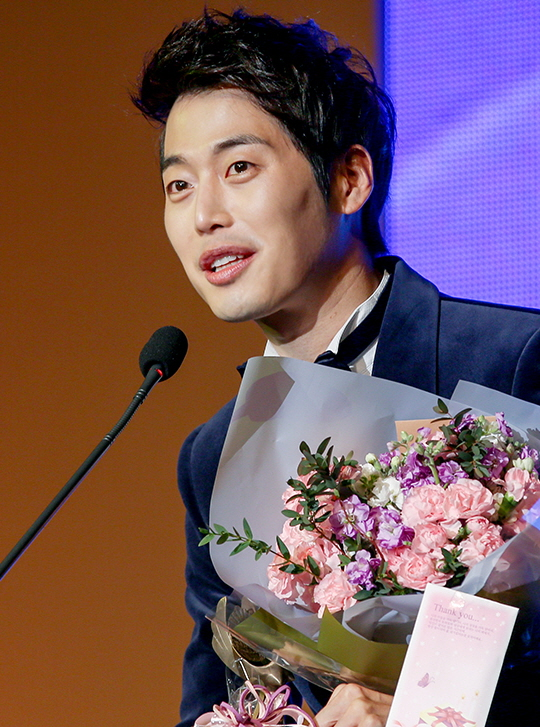
- Kim in 2012
- Born: 18 February 1981 (age 45); Seoul, South Korea
- Education: Sangmyung University - Theater and Film; Hanyang University Graduate School of International Tourism
- Occupations: Actor; MC
- Years active: 2001–present
- Agent: Flabison Entertainment
- Spouse: Park Seo-yeon (m. 2013)
- Children: Kim Yi-jun (b. 2013)

Korean name
- Hangul: 김재원
- Hanja: 金載沅
- RR: Gim Jaewon
- MR: Kim Chaewŏn
- Website: flabison.com

Kim Jaewon (born 18 February 1981) is a South Korean actor. He is best known for the television dramas Romance (2002), Listen to My Heart (2011), May Queen (2012), and The Scandal (2013).

== Career ==
Kim Jaewon made his acting debut in 2001 in the sitcom Honey Honey. He rose to stardom a year later when he played a high school senior who falls for his teacher (played by Kim Ha-neul) in 2002 hit drama Romance. Rival (with So Yoo-jin) and My Love Patzzi (with Jang Na-ra and Kim Rae-won) further raised his profile.

He reunited with Rival costar Kim Min-jung in Land of Wine (2003), where they played a young couple trying to revive traditional liquor amidst a family feud. Then in 2004, he starred opposite Sun Feifei in Beijing My Love, a South Korean-Chinese co-production which was shot 80% in China. He also appeared in the romantic comedy film 100 Days with Mr. Arrogant, followed by a supporting role in My 19 Year Old Sister-in-Law.

In Wonderful Life (2005), Kim's character deals with the consequences of a one-night stand in Singapore that leads to young marriage (to Eugene) and fatherhood. After playing a third-rate gangster who inherits a kindergarten and falls for a teacher (played by Han Ji-min) in Great Inheritance (2006), Kim was cast in his first period drama role as a nobleman romantically involved with a gisaeng in Hwang Jini (previous Mr. Arrogant costar Ha Ji-won played the title role). With his Korean Wave appeal, Kim then filmed the Chinese television drama First Love, which aired on CCTV in 2008.

Kim enlisted on March 23, 2009 to fulfill his mandatory military service, and was assigned to the Defense Media Agency. He was discharged on January 24, 2011.

As his acting comeback, Kim joined the cast of Listen to My Heart, for which he received praise for his portrayal of a deaf man. He and costar Hwang Jung-eum were later given recognition at the year-end MBC Drama Awards.

In fall 2011, Kim signed on to star in Me Too, Flower! opposite Lee Ji-ah. But on the first day of filming on October 4, he was injured when the moped he was riding malfunctioned and accidentally accelerated. After being diagnosed with a dislocated shoulder, bone fracture and torn ligaments and cartilage, he withdrew from the drama and was replaced by Yoon Shi-yoon. Kim cancelled all entertainment activities for ten months and underwent rehabilitation under Dr. Na Young-mu (well known as the doctor of figure skater Yuna Kim), eventually making a full recovery.

In 2012, Kim returned to the small screen opposite Han Ji-hye in May Queen, which depicts the success stories of people in the shipbuilding industry. He later won the Top Excellence Award in a Serial Drama at the MBC Drama Awards (he also hosted the ceremony). Kim was also the MC of Get It Beauty HOMME, a "beauty guide for men" on cable channel OnStyle.

Though he initially became popular due to his fair skin and beaming smile (which earned the actor the somewhat feminine nickname of "smiling angel" among fans), in recent years Kim has cultivated an image as a tough guy. This physicality was showcased in his next drama, The Scandal (2013), where he played a detective who discovers that the man he considers his father had kidnapped him as a child from his biological family.

In 2014, Kim joined Four Sons and One Daughter, a reality show with four male celebrities and one female guest star who form a family while living with fake parents in the countryside. He also began hosting the current affairs program The Real Story Eye, which reconstructs cases to uncover the facts beneath rumors and speculation. Later that year, he signed with a new talent agency, Will Entertainment.

Kim returned to period dramas in 2015 with Splendid Politics, playing a villainous King Injo.

In "God's Quiz: Reboot", he played the role of a lunatic Hyeon Sang-pil, continuing a diverse and wide acting transformation.

In 2020, he established a one-man entertainment agency with his manager, who he has been working with for 20 years. The company is based on trust and people.

== Personal life ==
Kim married Park Seo-yeon (who was three months pregnant at the time) on June 28, 2013 at Raum Wedding Hall in Yeoksam-dong, Seoul. The couple were childhood friends who began dating in October 2012. Park is the daughter of the head of an advertising agency, and she works in management at a modeling agency. Their son Yi-jun, nicknamed "Heaven," was born in December 2013. Yi-jun appeared on camera for the first time when his father made a guest appearance on Stars' Top Recipe at Fun-Staurant.

== Filmography ==
=== Television series ===
Year	Title	Role
2001	Honey Honey	Kim Jae-won
2001	You Say It's Love, But I Think It's Desire	Han Seung-jae
2001	Wuri's Family	Han Wu-ri
2002	Romance	Choi Kwan-woo
2002	Rival	Kang Woo-hyuk
2002	My Love Patzzi	Kang Seung-joon
2003	Land of Wine	Seo Jun
2004	Beijing My Love	Na Min Kook
2004	My 19 Year Old Sister-in-Law	Kang Min-jae
2005	Wonderful Life	Han Seung-wan
2006	Great Inheritance	Kang Hyun-se
2006	Hwang Jini	Kim Jung-han
2008	First Love	Zhang Sheng/Jean Wu
2011	Listen to My Heart	Cha Dong-joo
2012	May Queen	Kang San/Ryan Gass Kang
2013	The Scandal	Ha Eun-joong
2015	Splendid Politics	Prince Neungyang
2016	Father, I'll Take Care of You	Lee Hyun-woo
2018	Let Me Introduce Her	Han Kang-woo
2018	Quiz of God 5: Reboot	Hyeon Sang-pil

=== Films ===
Year	Title	Role
2004	100 Days with Mr. Arrogant	Ahn Hyung-jun
2007	Agent J	Bodyguard S

=== Variety shows ===
Year	Title	Notes/Ref.
2002	Inkigayo	Host
2012	Get It Beauty HOMME	Host
2012	Survival (Special Documentary's Narrator)	Narrator
2014	Four Sons and One Daughter	Cast Member
2014–2017	The Real Story Eye	Cast Member
2017–2018	Magic Control	Cast Member
2020–present	Stars' Top Recipe at Fun-Staurant	Contestant
2022	Hope TV	Host

=== Music video appearances ===
Year	Song title	Artist	Country
2001	"Thank her - S#1. Bus Stop"	Lee Soo-young	South Korea
2001	"Thank her - S#2. Fantasy"	Lee Soo-young	South Korea
2001	"Thank her - S#3. Cafe"	Lee Soo-young	South Korea
2002	"Silent Goodbye"	Leeds	South Korea
2005	"함께 있음을"	Ditto & Sympathy 2 compilation	South Korea
2007	"Agent J"	Jolin Tsai	Taiwan
2007	"Alone"	Jolin Tsai	Taiwan
2007	"Fear-free"	Jolin Tsai	Taiwan
2011	"초연"	Kan Jong-wook	South Korea
2014	"Talk about love"	V.A.	South Korea

== Discography ==
=== Single albums ===
Title	Album details	Track listing
Japanese
Onaji Sora no Shita (同じ空に下)	Released: July 23, 2008; Label: 中之島レーベル; Format: CD	Track listing: 1. Promise~同じ空に下~; 2. I Miss You; 3. Promise~同じ空の下~ (Korean); 4. I Miss You (Korean); 5. Promise~同じ空の下~ (Instrumental); 6. I Miss You (Instrumental)
Korean
Stay in the Moment	Released: Oct 28, 2013; Label: Uncle Pop; Format: Digital Download	Track listing: 1. My Woman; 2. My Woman (Instrumental)

=== Collaborations ===
Year	Artist	Song title	Album
2014	V.A.	"Talk about love"	Relief Project of W-Foundation

== Awards and nominations ==
Year	Award	Category	Nominated work	Result
2002	18th Korea Best Dresser Awards	Best Dressed, TV actor category	—N/a	Won
2002	MBC Drama Awards	Best New Actor	Romance	Won
2002	MBC Drama Awards	Popularity Award	Romance	Won
2002	SBS Drama Awards	New Star Award	Rival	Won
2002	SBS Drama Awards	Popularity Award	Rival	Won
2002	SBS Drama Awards	SBSi Award	Rival	Won
2002	SBS Drama Awards	Top 10 Stars	Rival	Won
2005	1st China Drama Billboard Awards	Most Popular Foreign Actor	Beijing My Love	Won
2010	4th Korea Cable TV Broadcasting Awards	Star of the Year Award		Won
2011	Jaekyung Ilbo's 2011 Star of the Year	Best Actor	Listen to My Heart	Won
2011	4th Korea Drama Awards	Best Actor	Listen to My Heart	Nominated
2011	MBC Drama Awards	Excellence Award, Actor in a Miniseries	Listen to My Heart	Won
2011	MBC Drama Awards	Popularity Award, Actor	Listen to My Heart	Won
2011	MBC Drama Awards	Best Couple Award	Listen to My Heart	Nominated
2012	20th Korea Cultural Entertainment Awards	Hallyu Star Award	May Queen	Won
2012	20th Korea Cultural Entertainment Awards	Best Actor Award, Drama	May Queen	Nominated
2012	MBC Drama Awards	Grand Prize (Daesang)	May Queen	Nominated
2012	MBC Drama Awards	Top Excellence Award, Actor in a Serial Drama	May Queen	Won
2012	MBC Drama Awards	Popularity Award, Actor	May Queen	Nominated
2013	MBC Drama Awards	Grand Prize (Daesang)	The Scandal	Nominated
2013	MBC Drama Awards	Top Excellence Award, Actor in a Special Project Drama	The Scandal	Won
2013	MBC Drama Awards	Popularity Award, Actor	The Scandal	Nominated
2013	MBC Drama Awards	Best Couple Award	The Scandal	Nominated
2014	9th Seoul International Drama Awards	Outstanding Korean Actor	The Scandal	Nominated
2014	50th Baeksang Arts Awards	Most Popular - Actor (TV Drama)	The Scandal	Nominated
2015	MBC Drama Awards	Excellence Award, Actor in a Special Project Drama	Splendid Politics	Nominated
2015	23rd Korea Cultural Entertainment Awards	Best Actor Award, Drama	Splendid Politics	Won
2018	SBS Drama Awards	Top Excellence Award, Actor in a Daily and Weekend Drama	Let Me Introduce Her	Won
2020	18th KBS Entertainment Awards	Rookie Award in Reality Category	Stars' Top Recipe at Fun-Staurant	Won
