= Land of Wine =

2003 South Korean TV series

- Genre: Drama
- Starring: Kim Jaewon; Kim Min-jung; Choi Kang-hee; Lee Dong-wook
- Country of origin: South Korea
- Original language: Korean
- No. of episodes: 16

Production
- Running time: 60 minutes
- Production company: JS Pictures

Original release
- Network: SBS
- Release: April 9 – May 29, 2003

Land of Wine (Korean: 술의 나라; RR: Surui nara) is a 16-episode South Korean television drama broadcast by SBS in 2003.

== Synopsis ==
In a place far from the town lived a boy and a girl. The girl's name was Lee Sun-hee. Her grandfather and father were selling traditional wine to earn money. They produce their own wine in a small shop. The boy's name was Suh Joon (Kim Jae Won). His parents, and Sun-hee's father and grandfather lived together.

From childhood, Sun-hee and Suh Joon were friends. After a few years, as they grew up, Suh Joon became a naughty boy. He always complained that he had no money to buy the things he wanted. He ran away from home to the town to find work. He promised Sun-hee that after he becomes rich he will want to live happily with Sun-hee. When he reached the town he worked as a waiter in a bar which belonged to the company of Song Hoe-jang. The son of the owner was Do-il and his younger sister Ae-ryeong.

== Cast ==
- Kim Jaewon as Suh Joon
- Kim Min-jung as Sun Hee
  - Lee Se-young as child Sun Hee
- Choi Kang-hee as Song Ae-ryeong
- Lee Dong-wook as Song Do-il
- Park In-hwan as Lee Jin-pyeong
- Lee Jung-gil as Song Hoe-jang
- Park Byung-hoon as Lee Jong-eon
- Kil Yong-woo as Suh Tae-gwan
- Kyung In-sun as Oh Hae-ran
- Kim Ha-yun as Suh Yeon
- Jo Hyung-ki as Jae Bok
- Kim Kyu-chul as Kil Soo
- Maeng Bong-hak

== Awards and nominations ==
Year	Award	Category	Nominee	Result	Ref.
2003	SBS Drama Awards	New Star Award	Lee Dong-wook	Won	
2003	SBS Drama Awards	Best Supporting Actor	Lee Dong-wook	Nominated	
