= Kan Jong-wook =

South Korean singer and songwriter

- Also known as: R.envy
- Born: April 11, 1982 (age 44); South Korea
- Genres: K-pop
- Occupations: Singer; songwriter
- Years active: 2004–present

Kan Jong-wook (Korean: 간종욱; born April, 1982) is a South Korean singer and songwriter. He is a twin brother of lyricist Kan Jong-woo. They have formed a K-pop vocal duo called "J2" (Korean: 제이투) in 2010. He sang many K-pop songs, including original soundtracks for television series Apgujeong Midnight Sun, Royal Family, May Queen, Pink Lipstick, Bravo, My Love!, and Gloria. He has recorded more than 24 albums (OSTs + self titled singles and extended plays).
