= Choi Jong-hwan =

South Korean actor (born 1964)

- Born: September 24, 1964 (age 62)
- Education: Seoul Institute of the Arts
- Occupations: Actor; professor
- Years active: 1989–present

Korean name
- Hangul: 최종환
- Hanja: 崔鐘煥
- RR: Choe Jonghwan
- MR: Ch'oe Chonghwan

Choi Jong-hwan (Korean: 최종환; born September 24, 1964) is a South Korean actor. Choi won Producer's Award for his role in Gyebaek and The Duo at the MBC Drama Awards in 2011.

== Filmography ==
=== Television series ===
Year	Title	Role
2001	Ladies of the Palace	King Jungjong
2004	Jangil Mountain	Lee Kyoung-soon
2005	Diamond Tears	Moon Young
2006	Yeon Gaesomun	King Yeongnyu
2007	The King and I	Yoon Ho
2009	Iris	Yeon Ki-hoon
2010	Jejungwon	Emperor Gojong
2011	Gyebaek	King Mu
2011	Dong Yi	Jang Mu-yeol
2011	The Duo	Dr. Kim
2011	If Tomorrow Comes	Seo In-ho
2012	An Immortal Masterpiece	Kim Hyun-myung
2013	7th Grade Civil Servant	Oh Kwang-jae
2013	Hur Jun, The Original Story	Yang Ye-soo
2014	Mama	Director Kim
2014	Birth of a Beauty	Kim Joon-cheol
2015	Splendid Politics	Prince Imhae
2015	The Ace	Jo Deuk-hong
2015	Make a Woman Cry	Kang Jin-han
2015	Six Flying Dragons	Jo Min-soo
2017	Saimdang, Memoir of Colors	King Jungjong / Min Jung-hak
2017	Bad Thief, Good Thief	Yoon Joong-tae
2017	The King in Love	Song Bang-young
2018	The Time	CEO Cheon
2021–2022	The King of Tears, Lee Bang-won	Jeong Mong-ju
2023	My Gold, My Jade	Dong Gyu-cheol

== Awards and nominations ==
Name of the award ceremony, year presented, category, nominee of the award, and the result of the nomination
Award ceremony	Year	Category	Nominee / Work	Result	Ref.
MBC Drama Awards	2017	Excellence Award, Actor in a Weekend Drama	Bad Thief, Good Thief	Nominated	
