= Yang Mi-kyung =

South Korean actress (born 1961)

- Born: July 25, 1961 (age 65); Jeju City, South Korea
- Education: Soongeui Women's College - Applied Art; Kkottongnae Hyundo University of Social Welfare; Sogang University - Master's degree in Media Arts
- Occupation: Actress
- Years active: 1983–present
- Spouse: Heo Seong-ryong (m. 1988)

Korean name
- Hangul: 양미경
- Hanja: 梁美京
- RR: Yang Migyeong
- MR: Yang Migyŏng

Yang Mi-kyung (Korean: 양미경; born July 25, 1961) is a South Korean actress. She is best known for playing the role of palace lady-in-waiting Han Baek-young in the popular period drama series Jewel in the Palace (2003).

== Other activities ==
Yang was also a visiting professor at Nagasaki Wesleyan University in 2011, and currently teaches Broadcasting and Entertainment as an adjunct professor at Induk University.

== Filmography ==
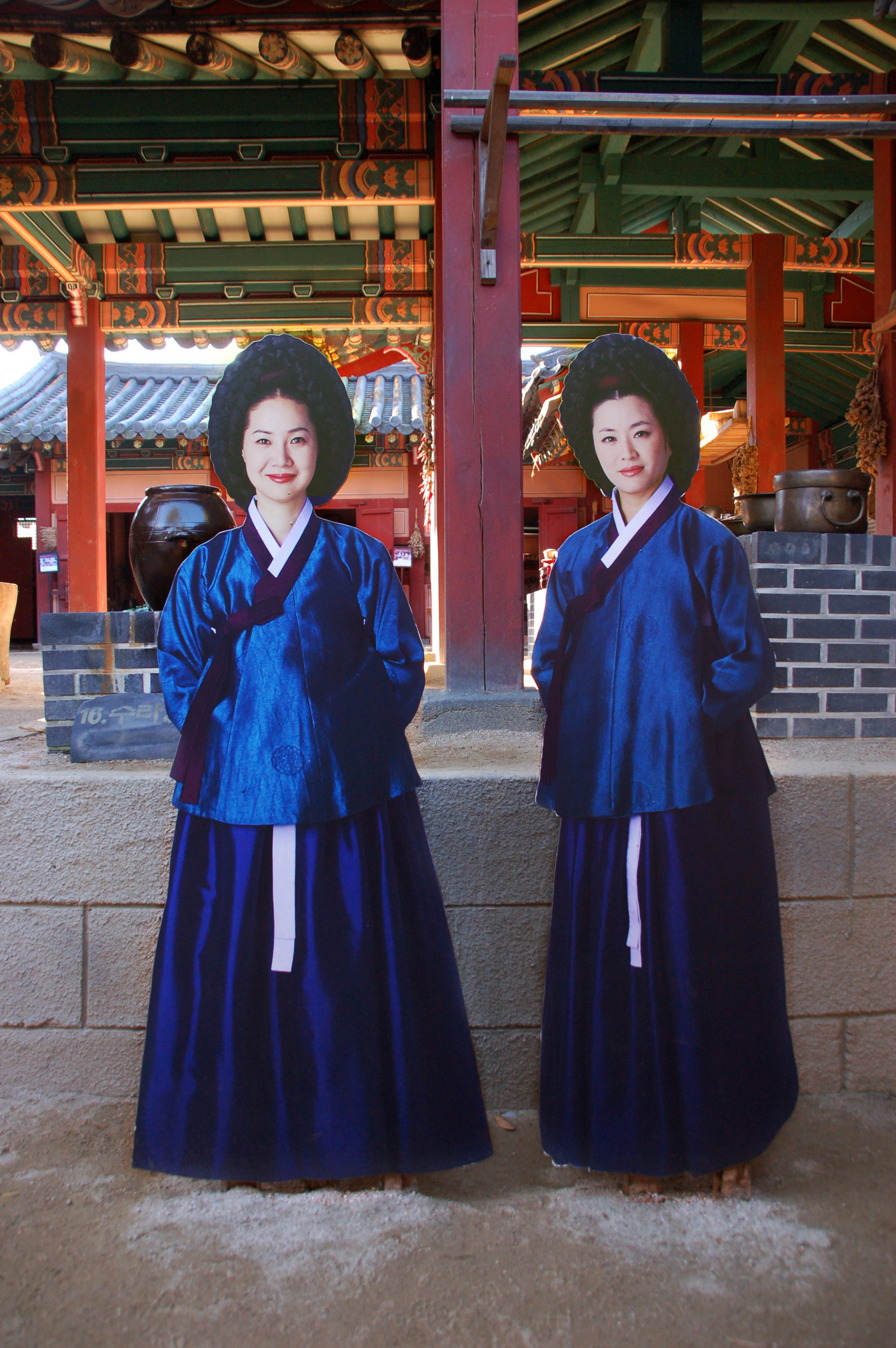
Cutouts depicting Yang as Lady Han (left) and Kyeon Mi-ri as Lady Choi (right) on display at the Dae Jang Geum Theme Park.

=== Television series ===
Year	Title	Role	Network
1984	Widow	Passerby	KBS
1985	Blue Classroom		KBS
1985	HDTV TV Literature: "Another's Voice"		KBS
1986	Your Portrait	Hee-joo	KBS2
1987	MBC Bestseller Theater: "Faint Shadow of Old Love"		MBC
1987	Wind, Wind, Wind		KBS2
1987	Sunaebo		KBS1
1987	Album of Life	Baek Nam-sook	MBC
1988	Whoa Hey Whoa Hey	Seung-mi	KBS2
1989	2nd Republic	Kim Jong-suk	MBC
1989	Half a Failure		KBS2
1990	The Stepping Stone	Seo Yoo-ra	KBS2
1991	Humble Men	Jung-hee	MBC
1991	A Tree Blooming with Love	Professor	KBS1
1991	Beyond the Mountains		MBC
1991	Women's Time	Jo In-sook	KBS2
1991	MBC Best Theater: "Outside the Door"	In-hyeong	MBC
1992	Seventy-year-old and Seven-year-old		MBC
1992	MBC Best Theater: "The Red Shoes"	Yang-sook	MBC
1992	Haengchon Apartment		MBC
1992	Two Sisters	Jin Sook-young	MBC
1992	Loving You	Lee Mi-sook	SBS
1993	Long Time Ago When I Was Young		KBS1
1993	Three Families Under One Roof		MBC
1993	MBC Best Theater: "Necklace of Thorns"	Myung-soon	MBC
1993	How's Your Husband?	Jeon Jin-ae	SBS
1993	Sisters	Song Mal-sook	MBC
1993	Eun-ha's River		KBS1
1994	Challenge		MBC
1995	Jang Nok-su	Lady Park	KBS2
1995	Good Men, Good Women		KBS2
1995	Sook-hee	Jang Hye-kyung	MBC
1995	4th Republic	Kim Ok-suk	MBC
1995	MBC Best Theater: "Divorce Report"	Seo-young	MBC
1995	LA Arirang		SBS
1996	MBC Best Theater: "My Husband Have AIDS"	Sang-hee	MBC
1996	Hometown of Legends: "Heat Cost"		KBS2
1996	If You Love Me	Cha Eun-mi	MBC
1997	MBC Best Theater: "Because I Loved You"	Eun-ah	MBC
1997	Happiness in Our Hearts	Jo Moon-shim	SBS
1997	Fireworks Display	Min-ho's mother	MBC
1997	Drops	Stepmother	MBC
1997	Boss and Wife		KBS
1998	Like the Wind, Like the Waves		KBS2
1998	MBC Best Theater: "Promise"		MBC
1998	Sunday Best: "That Light Green Color That Won't Be Erased"		KBS1
1998	Paper Crane		KBS2
1999	Sunday Best: "Eun Bi-ryeong"		KBS1
1999	The Little Prince	Jung Yoo-sung's mother	KBS2
1999	MBC Best Theater: "Thousand Year Dong-yi"	Seo-young	MBC
1999	MBC Best Theater: "Tears Secretly Flowing"	Min-jung	MBC
1999	Should My Tears Show		MBC
1999	Invitation	OB/GYN doctor	MBC
1999	MBC Best Theater: "Ang-sook"		MBC
2000	School 3	Yoo Eun-kyung	KBS1
2000	Fireworks	Cho-hee	SBS
2001	Tender Hearts	Ahn Su-ja	KBS1
2001	At the Corner		MBC
2001	Drama City: "When the Peach Blossoms"		KBS2
2001	Cool	Song Mi-sook	KBS2
2001	Way of Living: Couple	Mi-young	SBS
2001	Stepmother	Yang Soon-ja	KBS1
2002	Sunlight Upon Me	Kim Yeon-sook	MBC
2002	Unique Theater: A Story of Two Men	Yang Mi-kyung	KBS2
2002	Album of Life	Wol-young	KBS1
2003	Jewel in the Palace	Lady Han/Han Baek-young	MBC
2004	Crush	Soo-jin	SBS
2005	Be Strong, Geum-soon!	Kim Young-ok	MBC
2005	5th Republic	Yuk Young-soo	MBC
2005	Bichunmoo	(voice)	SBS
2005	Jikji	Lady Won Deok-Bi	MBC
2007	The King and I	Queen Jeonghui	SBS
2007	Kang Wan-suk	Kang Wan-suk	PBC
2010	Blossom Sisters	Kim Sook-kyung	MBC
2010	MBC Sunday Drama Theater: "Housewife Kim Kwang-ja's Third Activities"	Kim Kwang-ja	MBC
2011	The Duo	Gwi-dong's birth mother	MBC
2011	Miss Ripley	Akiko Sakamoto	MBC
2012	Moon Embracing the Sun	Shin Jung-kyung	MBC
2012	May Queen	Lee Geum-hee	MBC
2013	Bel Ami	Kim Mi-sook	KBS2
2014	Jang Bo-ri Is Here!	Song Ok-soo	MBC
2015	Mask	Kang Ok-soon	SBS
2015	High Society		SBS
2016	Still Loving You	Park Yeon-mi	KBS1
2018	Grand Prince	Queen Dowager Shim	TV Chosun
2020	Man in a Veil	Lee Kyung-hye	KBS2
2021	The All-Round Wife	Oh Jang-geum	KBS1

=== Film ===
Year	Title	Role
1985	Fire-Lighter	
1998	Paradise Lost	Ji-woo's wife
2000	Truth Game	Wife
2003	The Crescent Moon	Han Young-ja
2009	Castaway on the Moon	Kim Jung-yeon's mother (cameo)

=== Variety/radio show ===
Year	Title	Notes
1993–1995	House Full of Happiness with Seo Se-won and Yang Mi-kyung	Host
1997	Between 3:00 to 5:00 with Yang Mi-kyung	DJ
1999	The Clinic for Married Couples: Love and War	Member of mediation committee
2001–2002	Village Songs with Yang Mi-kyung	DJ
2001–2002	The Pursuit of Happiness - Live	Host
2005	Sing Sing Sunday	Host
2005–2006	Love in Asia	Host
2005–2006	The Way to You - This Is Yang Mi-kyung	DJ
2009–2010	Shin Shin Woo Shin - Notes in Time with Yang Mi-kyung	Narrator
2011–present	Multicultural Special - We Are Like a Rainbow with Yang Mi-kyung	DJ

== Theater ==
Year	Title	Role
2004	Even If You Hate Me, Once Again	Kim Soo-jung

== Bibliography ==
Year	Title	Notes/Ref.
1997	If You Want to Live a Happy Life	essay collection
2004	Yang Mi-kyung's Poems Read with a Heart	60 poems by her favorite poet
2008	With Love	essay collection; published in Japan

== Awards ==
Year	Award	Category	Nominated work
1985	KBS Drama Awards	Best New Actress	
2000	KBS Drama Awards	Best Supporting Actress	School 3
2003	MBC Drama Awards	Special Acting Award	Dae Jang Geum
2004	40th Baeksang Arts Awards	Most Popular Actress (TV)	Dae Jang Geum
2006	40th Taxpayer's Day	Prime Minister's Commendation	—N/a
2008	Federation for Asian Cultural Promotion	Hallyu Achievement Award	—N/a
2009	Kkottongnae Hyundo University of Social Welfare	Achievement Award	—N/a
2011	4th Korea Sharing and Volunteer Service Awards	Grand Prize, Individual category	—N/a
2012	MBC Drama Awards	Golden Acting Award, Actress	Moon Embracing the Sun, May Queen
