= Great Inheritance =

2006 South Korean television drama

- Promotional poster
- Also known as: Great Expectations; Kindergarten Love
- Hangul: 위대한 유산
- Hanja: 偉大한 遺産
- RR: Widaehan yusan
- MR: Widaehan yusan
- Genre: Romance, Drama, Comedy
- Written by: Lee Sook-jin; Kim Tae-hee
- Directed by: Kim Pyung-joong
- Starring: Kim Jaewon; Han Ji-min; Kim Ji-hoon; Lee Mi-sook
- Country of origin: South Korea
- Original language: Korean
- No. of episodes: 17

Production
- Producer: Kim Jung-gyu
- Running time: 70 minutes Wednesdays and Thursdays at 21:55 (KST)

Original release
- Network: Korean Broadcasting System
- Release: May 3 – June 29, 2006

Great Inheritance (Korean: 위대한 유산; RR: Widaehan yusan) is a 2006 South Korean television drama starring Kim Jaewon and Han Ji-min. It aired on KBS2 from May 3 to June 29, 2006 on Wednesdays and Thursdays at 21:55 for 17 episodes.

== Plot ==
Kang Hyun-se is a gangster of the Hanbando Group who inherits the Maru Kindergarten after his estranged mother dies from a heart attack. He intends to sell the kindergarten and comes to terrorize the staff, only to learn that his mother had stipulated that he has to work as kindergarten teacher for 100 days in order to gain legal ownership.

Meanwhile, a development firm called NK plans to buy the kindergarten's property and begin construction on a project named Rainbow Park, an amusement park for children. Rainbow Park is a dream project of one manager named Jung Il-do, who mentors a young graduate from America, manager Choi Shi-wan, who incidentally shares a past with Yoo Mi-rae, a dedicated and naive kindergarten teacher.

The Hanbando Group, headed by gangster boss So Dong-pa, convinces Hyun-se to fulfill his mother's conditions and then turn over the kindergarten to the gang's control once the 100-day period is completed. This would force NK into giving So Dong-pa a seat in its board of directors.

Hyun-se reluctantly endures teaching at the kindergarten, inevitably falling for Mi-rae and the lovable children. He also discovers the identity of his biological father.

== Cast ==
- Kim Jaewon - Kang Hyun-se
- Han Ji-min - Yoo Mi-rae, teacher
- Kim Ji-hoon - Choi Shi-wan
- Lee Mi-sook - Go Ah-ra, kindergarten director
- Jang Hyun-sung - Jung Man-ho, nutritionist/handyman
- Byun Hee-bong - Jung Il-do, land developer
- Son Byong-ho - So Dong-pa, gang boss
- Jung Tae-woo - Nal-chi, Hyun-se's sidekick
- Shin Dong-woo - Jin Kyung-ho, student
- Yoo Yeon-mi - Han Ye-seo, student
- Jin Ji-hee - Goo Dong-joo, student
- Kim Min-ki - Hwant Seung-hyun, student
- Choi Han-wool - Han-wool, teacher
- Choi In-kyung - Chun-sa, teacher
- Ha Joo-hee - Jin Yoo-jung, Kyung-ho's mother
- Park Jae-rom - Ye-seo's mother
- Kim Jin-soo - Goo Joon-ik, Dong-joo's father/policeman
- Noh Hyun-hee - Seung-hyun's mother
- Hwang Suk-kyu - Chun Sang-sik, gang member
- Park Joo-ah - Ms. Kang, Hyun-se's mother

== Ratings ==
In the table below, the blue numbers represent the lowest ratings and the red numbers represent the highest ratings.

Episode #	Original broadcast date	TNmS Ratings
1	2006-05-03	7.1%
2	2006-05-04	8.0%
3	2006-05-10	6.6%
4	2006-05-11	6.5%
5	2006-05-17	8.4%
6	2006-05-18	8.6%
7	2006-05-24	9.6%
8	2006-05-25	9.0%
9	2006-05-31	8.4%
10	2006-06-01	10.1%
11	2006-06-07	8.4%
12	2006-06-08	10.3%
13	2006-06-15	7.9%
14	2006-06-21	10.0%
15	2006-06-22	8.9%
16	2006-06-28	10.1%
17	2006-06-29	11.6%
Average		8.8%
