= Romance (South Korean TV series) =

2002 South Korean television series

- Hangul: 로망스
- RR: Romangseu
- MR: Romangsŭ
- Genre: Drama; Romance; Comedy
- Written by: Bae Yoo-mi
- Directed by: Lee Dae-young
- Starring: Kim Jaewon; Kim Ha-neul
- Country of origin: South Korea
- Original language: Korean
- No. of episodes: 16

Production
- Producer: Jung Woon-hyun

Original release
- Network: Munhwa Broadcasting Corporation
- Release: May 8 – June 27, 2002

Romance (Korean: 로망스) is a 2002 South Korean television drama series starring Kim Jaewon and Kim Ha-neul. It aired on MBC on Wednesdays and Thursdays at 21:55 for 16 episodes from May 8 to June 27, 2002.

== Plot ==
Fatal love strikes us out of a sudden and helplessly takes us deep down into the sea of fervor, giving us no choice but to yield. This drama beautifully unfolds the forbidden passion between a teacher and a student. Chae-Won and Gwan-Woo meet for the first time at a rural seaside village flower festival. They fall in love at first sight, not in their dreams have they known that Chae-Won is the teacher at Gwan-Woo's high school.

The second time they meet is at the classroom where they realize the situation and become bewildered and embarrassed. The love story between the two young people is overlapped with Gwan-Woo's tearful success story and this inspire the viewers with high emotion.

== Cast and characters ==
=== Main cast ===
- Kim Jaewon as Choi Kwan-woo
- Kim Ha-neul as Kim Chae-won
- Jung Sung-hwan as Lee Eun-seok
- Kim Yoo-mi as Choi Yun-hee

=== Supporting cast ===
- Han Hye-jin as Yoon Ji-soo
- Kim Hae-sook as Oh Young-seok
- Hyun Suk as Choi Jang-soo
- Go Myung-hwan as Kim Bong-kyun
- Shim Yang-hong as Kim Dae-kun
- Park Won-sook as President Yoon Mi-hee
- Kim Yong-gun as Chairman Lee Young-kyu
- Ahn Yeon-hong as Seo Min-joo
- Moon Ji-yoon as Choi Jang-bi
- Lee Byung-joon as Choi Gong-myung
- Jung Kyung-soon as a female teacher who smokes
- Kang Rae-yeon as So-young's friend
- Lee Min-ho as a student
- Kim Kyo-chul
- Lee Eung-kyung
- Lee Gun-joo
- Lee Jong-rae
