= 2011 MBC Drama Awards =

30th edition of award ceremony

- Date: December 30, 2011
- Hosted by: Jung Joon-ho; Lee Ha-nui
- Best Drama Serial: The Greatest Love

Television coverage
- Network: MBC

The 2011 MBC Drama Awards is a ceremony honoring the outstanding achievement in television on the Munhwa Broadcasting Corporation (MBC) network for the year of 2011. It was held on December 30, 2011 and hosted by Jung Joon-ho and Lee Ha-nui.

== Nominations and winners ==
(Winners denoted in bold)

Drama of the Year
**The Greatest Love**; Listen to My Heart; Indomitable Daughters-in-Law; Royal Family; Twinkle Twinkle
Top Excellence Award, Actor in a Miniseries	Top Excellence Award, Actress in a Miniseries
**Cha Seung-won** – **The Greatest Love**; Ji Sung – Royal Family; Song Seung-heon – My Princess	**Gong Hyo-jin** – **The Greatest Love**; Kim Tae-hee – My Princess; Yum Jung-ah – Royal Family
Top Excellence Award, Actor in a Serial Drama	Top Excellence Award, Actress in a Serial Drama
**Kim Suk-hoon** – **Twinkle Twinkle**; Kim Kap-soo – Just Like Today; Park Sang-min – I Trusted Men	**Kim Hyun-joo** – **Twinkle Twinkle**; **Shin Ae-ra** – **Indomitable Daughters-in-Law**; Seo Young-hee – A Thousand Kisses
Excellence Award, Actor in a Miniseries	Excellence Award, Actress in a Miniseries
**Kim Jaewon** – **Listen to My Heart**; Chun Jung-myung – The Duo; Namkoong Min – Listen to My Heart	**Hwang Jung-eum** – **Listen to My Heart**; **Lee Bo-young** – **Bravo, My Love!**; Lee Da-hae – Miss Ripley; Song Ji-hyo – Gyebaek
Excellence Award, Actor in a Serial Drama	Excellence Award, Actress in a Serial Drama
**Ji Hyun-woo** – **A Thousand Kisses**; Kim Jung-hyun – Dangerous Women; Lee Hoon – Indomitable Daughters-in-Law	**Lee Yoo-ri** – **Twinkle Twinkle**; Go Eun-mi – Dangerous Women; Yoon Se-ah – You're So Pretty
Golden Acting Award, Actor in a Miniseries	Golden Acting Award, Actress in a Miniseries
**Jeong Bo-seok** – **Listen to My Heart**, **Stormy Lovers**	**Bae Jong-ok** – **Bravo, My Love!**
Golden Acting Award, Actor in a Serial Drama	Golden Acting Award, Actress in a Serial Drama
**Kil Yong-woo** – **Twinkle Twinkle**	**Cha Hwa-yeon** – **A Thousand Kisses**
Best New Actor in a Miniseries	Best New Actress in a Miniseries
**Lee Gi-kwang** – **My Princess**; **Park Yoo-chun** – **Miss Ripley**; Jung Yong-hwa – Heartstrings; Yoon Kye-sang – The Greatest Love	**Hyomin** – **Gyebaek**; **Seo Hyun-jin** – **The Duo**; Cha Ye-ryun – Royal Family; Yoo In-na – The Greatest Love
Best New Actor in a Serial Drama	Best New Actress in a Serial Drama
**Park Yoon-jae** – **Indomitable Daughters-in-Law**; Kang Dong-ho – Twinkle Twinkle; Park Yu-hwan – Twinkle Twinkle	**Lee Ha-nui** – **Indomitable Daughters-in-Law**; Choi Eun-seo – Stormy Lovers; Kim So-eun – A Thousand Kisses
Best Young Actor	Best Young Actress
**Yang Han-yeol** – **The Greatest Love**	**Kim Yoo-bin** – **Bravo, My Love!**
Special Acting Award	Producer's Award
**Kim Young-ae** – **Royal Family**; **Yoon Tae-young** – **Midnight Hospital**	**Choi Jong-hwan** – **Gyebaek**, **The Duo**; **Kim Jung-tae** – **Can't Lose**, **Miss Ripley**; **Song Ji-hyo** – **Gyebaek**
Popularity Award, Actor	Popularity Award, Actress
**Kim Jae-won** – **Listen to My Heart**; Cha Seung-won – The Greatest Love; Ji Sung – Royal Family; Kim Suk-hoon – Twinkle Twinkle; Song Seung-heon – My Princess	**Gong Hyo-jin** – **The Greatest Love**; Choi Ji-woo – Can't Lose; Hwang Jung-eum – Listen to My Heart; Kim Hyun-joo – Twinkle Twinkle; Kim Tae-hee – My Princess
Best Couple Award	Writer of the Year
**Cha Seung-won** and **Gong Hyo-jin** – **The Greatest Love**; Choi Ji-woo and Yoon Sang-hyun – Can't Lose; Kim Jae-won and Hwang Jung-eum – Listen to My Heart; Kim Suk-hoon and Kim Hyun-joo – Twinkle Twinkle; Song Seung-heon and Kim Tae-hee – My Princess; Yum Jung-ah and Ji Sung – Royal Family	**Bae Yoo-mi** – **Twinkle Twinkle**; **Hong Mi-ran, Hong Jung-eun** – **The Greatest Love**
Best TV Voice Actress	Achievement Award
**Bak Seon-yeong**	**Kang Boo-ja** – **Indomitable Daughters-in-Law**
