= Park Gun-woo (actor) =

South Korean actor

- Born: Park Geon-tae; February 5, 1996 (age 30); Suwon, Gyeonggi-do South Korea
- Education: Chung-Ang University
- Occupation: Actor
- Years active: 2001–2015
- Agent: Cabin 74

Korean name
- Hangul: 박건태
- Hanja: 朴健泰
- RR: Bak Geontae
- MR: Pak Kŏnt'ae

Stage name
- Hangul: 박건우
- Hanja: 朴健佑
- RR: Bak Geonu
- MR: Pak Kŏnu

Park Gun-woo (born Park Gun-tae on February 5, 1996) is a South Korean actor. He began his career as a child actor in TV series such as I'm Sorry, I Love You (2004), Time Between Dog and Wolf (2007) and East of Eden (2008). As a teenage actor, he appeared in Warrior Baek Dong-soo (2011) and May Queen (2012).

== Filmography ==
=== Television series ===
Year	Title	Role
2002	Hard Love	
2002	I'll Be on Your Side	Lee Chan-joo
2003	Mittens	Joon-young
2003	Age of Warriors	Yi Ui-min's second son
2004	I'm Sorry, I Love You	Kim Gal-chi
2005	TV Literature "Bird, Bird"	young Jakeunnom
2006	Drama City "Tomorrow and Tomorrow"	Haeng-soo
2006	Drama City "Scrubber No. 3"	Young-woong
2006	Hello God	young Haru
2006	Hwarang Fighter Maru	Kim Maru/Gwan-chang
2007	Time Between Dog and Wolf	young Lee Soo-hyun
2007	Eight Days, Assassination Attempts against King Jeongjo	young Yi San
2008	East of Eden	young Lee Dong-wook
2008	The Kingdom of the Winds	young Muhyul
2009	My Dad Loves Trouble	Yoon-seob
2009	Ja Myung Go	young Wang-hol
2009	Becoming a Billionaire	young Choi Suk-bong
2010	Kim Su-ro, The Iron King	young Kim Su-ro
2010	Future Boy	Kim Mil
2010	Good Friends	Broadcasting chief
2011	Warrior Baek Dong-soo	young Yeo Woon
2012	The King 2 Hearts	young Lee Jae-kang
2012	Superman Flies	Gyu-wan
2012	May Queen	young Park Chang-hee
2013	Iris II: New Generation	young Jung Yoo-gun
2013	Goddess of Fire	young Kim Tae-do
2015	KBS Drama Special "Stay Still"	Song Min-hyuk
2015	Orange Marmalade	Hwang Beom-sung
2015	The Merchant: Gaekju 2015	young Gil So-gae

=== Film ===
Year	Title	Role
2001	Volcano High	young Kim Kyung-soo
2002	R. U. Ready?	Sang-ho
2004	Too Beautiful to Lie	Child at the pharmacy
2004	Hi! Dharma 2: Showdown in Seoul	Boy monk
2006	Love Phobia	young Cha Jo-kang
2006	Bambi II	Bambi (voice, Korean dubbed)
2007	Big Bang	young Park Man-soo

=== Music video appearances ===
Year	Song title	Artist
2012	"Return"	Lee Seung-gi

== Theater ==
Year	Title	Role	Ref.
2022	Sleuth	Milo Tindle	

== Awards ==
Year	Award	Category	Nominated work	Result
2004	KBS Drama Awards	Best Young Actor	I'm Sorry, I Love You	Won
2008	MBC Drama Awards	Best Young Actor	East of Eden	Won
2012	1st K-Drama Star Awards	Best Young Actor	May Queen, The King 2 Hearts	Won
