= Listen to My Heart (TV series) =

2011 South Korean television drama

- Promotional poster
- Also known as: Do You Hear My Heart?
- Genre: Romance; Melodrama
- Written by: Moon Hee-jung
- Directed by: Kim Sang-ho
- Starring: Kim Jaewon; Hwang Jung-eum; Namkoong Min
- Country of origin: South Korea
- Original language: Korean
- No. of episodes: 30

Production
- Producer: Im Hwa-min
- Running time: 60 minutes
- Production company: Logos Film

Original release
- Network: MBC TV
- Release: April 2 – July 10, 2011

Listen to My Heart (Korean: 내 마음이 들리니?; RR: Nae maeumi deullini?; lit. Can You Hear My Heart?) is a 2011 South Korean television series starring Kim Jaewon, Hwang Jung-eum and Namkoong Min. It aired on MBC from April 2 to July 10, 2011, on Saturdays and Sundays at 21:45 for 30 episodes.

== Plot ==
This is the love story of Cha Dong-joo (Kim Jaewon), a man who's been rendered deaf after an accident but pretends he can hear, and Bong Woo-ri (Hwang Jung-eum), a woman who's intelligent but pretends she's dim-witted to protect the dignity of her mentally disabled father. She has been looking for her step-brother, Bong Ma-roo, who ran away from home 16 years ago. What she soon finds out is that Jang Joon-ha (Namkoong Min), Cha Dong-joo's brother, is Bong Ma-roo himself.

== Cast ==
- Kim Jaewon as Cha Dong-joo
  - Kang Chan-hee as young Dong-joo
- Hwang Jung-eum as Bong Woo-ri
  - Kim Sae-ron as Young Bong Woo-ri
- Namkoong Min as Jang Joon-ha
  - Seo Young-joo as young Joon-ha/Bong Ma-roo
- Go Joon-hee as Kang Min-soo
- Lee Kyu-han as Lee Seung-chul
- Jeong Bo-seok as Bong Young-kyu
- Lee Hye-young as Tae Yeon-sook
- Song Seung-hwan as Choi Jin-chul
- Youn Yuh-jung as Hwang Soon-geum
- Kang Moon-young as Kim Shin-ae
- Kim Yeo-jin as Na Mi-sook
- Lee Sung-min as Lee Myung-gyun
- Hwang Young-hee as Seung-chul's mother
- Noh Hee-ji as Park Dae-ri
- Kim Kwang-kyu as Botanical garden director and Young-kyu's boss.

== Ratings ==
Broadcast date	Episode #	Average audience share			
Broadcast date	Episode #	TNmS Ratings		AGB Nielsen	
Broadcast date	Episode #	Nationwide	Seoul	Nationwide	Seoul
2011-04-02	01	10.8 (10th)	13.4 (6th)	12.6 (7th)	14.7 (4th)
2011-04-03	02	9.6 (15th)	11.7 (11th)	11.6 (8th)	13.3 (7th)
2011-04-09	03	10.9 (7th)	13.8 (6th)	12.1 (7th)	12.4 (8th)
2011-04-10	04	10.7 (8th)	12.8 (7th)	12.6 (7th)	14.3 (5th)
2011-04-16	05	12.6 (5th)	15.0 (6th)	15.1 (3rd)	15.9 (5th)
2011-04-17	06	11.4 (7th)	14.0 (6th)	15.0 (5th)	16.7 (4th)
2011-04-23	07	11.8 (8th)	15.0 (6th)	15.5 (3rd)	16.7 (3rd)
2011-04-24	08	12.5 (7th)	15.4 (6th)	15.7 (4th)	17.3 (4th)
2011-04-30	09	16.9 (4th)	19.8 (2nd)	21.6 (3rd)	23.3 (2nd)
2011-05-01	10	11.5 (7th)	14.2 (6th)	16.1 (6th)	17.7 (4th)
2011-05-07	11	13.1 (4th)	16.0 (4th)	15.8 (6th)	17.6 (3rd)
2011-05-08	12	13.9 (6th)	16.8 (5th)	16.3 (4th)	18.1 (3rd)
2011-05-14	13	13.5 (5th)	16.1 (5th)	16.6 (5th)	17.3 (5th)
2011-05-15	14	12.2 (7th)	15.4 (6th)	16.3 (5th)	17.7 (3rd)
2011-05-21	15	14.5 (4th)	18.4 (2nd)	18.0 (3rd)	19.3 (3rd)
2011-05-22	16	13.9 (6th)	17.7 (4th)	16.3 (6th)	17.4 (5th)
2011-05-28	17	15.2 (5th)	18.5 (5th)	16.8 (4th)	17.6 (5th)
2011-05-29	18	14.0 (6th)	16.4 (6th)	16.7 (6th)	18.0 (5th)
2011-06-04	19	14.7 (4th)	16.5 (4th)	17.0 (4th)	18.8 (2nd)
2011-06-05	20	13.2 (5th)	15.9 (5th)	15.0 (5th)	16.0 (7th)
2011-06-11	21	12.7 (5th)	15.0 (6th)	15.2 (4th)	16.5 (4th)
2011-06-12	22	13.5 (6th)	16.8 (6th)	15.4 (5th)	17.1 (4th)
2011-06-18	23	13.2 (5th)	17.3 (5th)	15.8 (4th)	17.0 (4th)
2011-06-19	24	13.1 (7th)	15.8 (6th)	15.1 (5th)	16.3 (4th)
2011-06-25	25	12.3 (9th)	14.8 (6th)	15.0 (4th)	16.9 (4th)
2011-06-26	26	9.8 (15th)	12.3 (13th)	14.0 (7th)	16.0 (6th)
2011-07-02	27	12.3 (7th)	14.5 (6th)	14.0 (4th)	15.2 (5th)
2011-07-03	28	10.7 (15th)	13.4 (10th)	13.3 (7th)	15.3 (7th)
2011-07-09	29	12.6 (8th)	14.7 (7th)	15.5 (4th)	17.1 (3rd)
2011-07-10	30	12.8 (9th)	15.7 (6th)	15.6 (4th)	16.7 (5th)
Average		12.7%	15.5%	15.4%	16.8%

== Original soundtrack ==
내 마음이 들리니 / Listen to My Heart OST Original Sound Track

Soundtrack album by Various artists
- Released: June 24, 2011
- Genres: Pop, K-pop, soundtrack, R&B
- Labels: The Groove, Loen Entertainment

The official soundtrack album for Listen to My Heart was released on June 24, 2011. The title track is "당신을 사랑합니다" by Gavy NJ.

No.	Title	Artist	Length
1.	"들리나요" (Can You Hear Me?)	Zia
2.	"그대만이 들려요" (I Can Only Hear You)	Kim Jae Suk (김재석) of Wanted (원티드)
3.	"당신을 사랑합니다" (I Love You)	Gavy NJ
4.	"소녀 소년을 만나다"	Masoolmoja Parade (마술모자 퍼레이드)
5.	"좋은 사람" (Good Person)	Hwang Jung Eum
6.	"바보야" (You Fool)	Postmen (포스트맨)
7.	"내가 거기로 갈게"	Various Artists
8.	"Remember Me"	Various Artists
9.	"First Time"	Various Artists
10.	"내 마음이 들리니"	Various Artists
11.	"Funeral Home"	Various Artists
12.	"우리동주"	Various Artists
13.	"Secret My Love"	Various Artists
14.	"Play With Me"	Various Artists
15.	"Play With Me (Rhythm Guitar Ver.)"	Various Artists
16.	"들리나요 (Inst.)" (Can You Hear Me? (Inst.)	Various Artists
17.	"그대만이 들려요 (Inst.)" (I Can Only Hear You (Inst.)	Various Artists
18.	"당신을 사랑합니다 (Inst.)"	Various Artists
19.	"바보야 (Inst.)" (You Fool (Inst.))	Various Artists

== Awards and nominations ==
Year	Award	Category	Recipient	Result
2011
2011	Jaekyung Ilbo's 2011 Star of the Year	Best Actor	Kim Jaewon	Won
2011	4th Korea Drama Awards	Best Actor	Kim Jaewon	Nominated
2011	4th Korea Drama Awards	Best Director	Kim Sang-ho	Nominated
2011	MBC Drama Awards	Drama of the Year	Listen to My Heart	Nominated
2011	MBC Drama Awards	Excellence Award, Actor in a Miniseries	Kim Jaewon	Won
2011	MBC Drama Awards	Excellence Award, Actor in a Miniseries	Namkoong Min	Nominated
2011	MBC Drama Awards	Excellence Award, Actress in a Miniseries	Hwang Jung-eum	Won
2011	MBC Drama Awards	Golden Acting Award, Actor in a Miniseries	Jeong Bo-seok	Won
2011	MBC Drama Awards	Popularity Award, Actor	Kim Jaewon	Won
2011	MBC Drama Awards	Popularity Award, Actress	Hwang Jung-eum	Nominated
2011	MBC Drama Awards	Best Couple Award	Kim Jaewon and Hwang Jung-eum	Nominated
