= Bak Seon-yeong (voice actress) =

South Korean voice actress

Park Seon-yeong (Korean: 박선영; born 1970) is a South Korean voice actress who joined the Munhwa Broadcasting Corporation's voice acting division in 1997, she was voiced Kang Lim's mother in Tooniverse's The Haunted House series.

== Roles ==
=== Broadcast TV ===
- The Haunted House (Tooniverse original network) - Ryu

=== Dubbing ===
==== Film ====
- Election (replacing Reese Witherspoon, Korea TV Edition, MBC)
- Vanilla Sky (replacing Cameron Diaz, Korea TV Edition, MBC)
- High Risk (replacing Chingmy Yau, Korea TV Edition, MBC)
- Double Jeopardy (replacing Annabeth Gish, Korea TV Edition, MBC)
- Derailed (extra guest, Korea TV Edition, MBC)
- The Butterfly Effect (replacing Amy Smart, Korea TV Edition, MBC)
- About a Boy (replacing Rachel Weisz, Korea TV Edition, MBC)
- Six Days Seven Nights (replacing Anne Heche, Korea TV Edition, MBC)
- Pirates of the Caribbean: The Curse of the Black Pearl (replacing Keira Knightley, Korea TV Edition, MBC)
- The Italian Job (replacing Charlize Theron, Korea TV Edition, MBC)
- Sky Captain and the World of Tomorrow (replacing Gwyneth Paltrow, Korea TV Edition, MBC)

==== Television ====
- The Melancholy of Haruhi Suzumiya (Haruhi Suzumiya)
- Hannah Montana (Disney Channel) (Lilly Truscott)
- Iron Kid (KBS)
- Ojamajo Doremi (Magical Remi from 1st - 3rd Series, Korea TV Edition, MBC and 4th series Korea TV Edition, Tooniverse)
- The Powerpuff Girls (Cartoon Network, Korea TV Edition) (Blossom)
- 24 (replacing Reiko Aylesworth by season 2, Korea TV Edition, MBC)
- Jimmy Neutron (Korea TV Edition, MBC)
- Ragnarok the Animation (Korea TV Edition, SBS)
- Shadow Fighter (MBC)
- Bikkuriman (Bumerang Fighter, Korea TV Edition, MBC)
- ¡Vivan los niños! (Korea TV Edition, SBS)
- CSI: Crime Scene Investigation (replacing Louise Lombard by Season 6, Korea TV Edition, MBC)

== Video games ==
- Getcha Ghost-Shinbi - Kang Lim's mother

== Awards ==
- 2011 MBC Drama Awards: Best TV Voice Actress

== See also ==
- Munhwa Broadcasting Corporation
- MBC Voice Acting Division
- Tooniverse
