= The Scandal (2013 TV series) =

South Korean television drama

- Promotional poster
- Also known as: Scandal; Scandal: A Shocking and Wrongful Incident
- Hangul: 스캔들: 매우 충격적이고 부도덕한 사건
- RR: Seukaendeul: maeu chunggyeokjeogigo budodeokhan sageon
- MR: Sŭk'aendŭl: maeu ch'unggyŏkchŏgigo pudodŏkhan sakŏn
- Genre: Melodrama; Family; Revenge; Crime
- Written by: Bae Yoo-mi
- Directed by: Kim Jin-man; Park Jae-beom
- Starring: Kim Jaewon; Jo Yoon-hee; Cho Jae-hyun; Park Sang-min; Shin Eun-kyung; Ki Tae-young
- Composer: Kim Soo-han
- Country of origin: South Korea
- Original language: Korean
- No. of episodes: 36

Production
- Executive producer: Kim Sang-ho
- Cinematography: Jung Seung-woo; Kim Seon-cheol
- Editor: Bae Hee-gyeong

Original release
- Network: MBC
- Release: June 29 – October 27, 2013

The Scandal (Korean: 스캔들: 매우 충격적이고 부도덕한 사건; lit. 'Scandal: A Very Astounding and Immoral Incident') is a 2013 South Korean television series starring Kim Jaewon, Jo Yoon-hee, Cho Jae-hyun, Park Sang-min, Shin Eun-kyung, Ki Tae-young, Kim Hye-ri, and Kim Gyu-ri. It aired on MBC from June 29 to October 27, 2013, on Saturdays and Sundays at 21:45 for 36 episodes. This drama commemorated Seoul Olympics' 25th anniversary.

== Plot ==
Detective Ha Eun-joong uncovers a shocking secret: Ha Myung-geun, the man he believed to be his father, had actually kidnapped him as a child. Myung-geun had lost his own son in a building collapse and, as revenge against Jang Tae-ha—the man responsible for the tragedy—he abducted Tae-ha's son and raised him as his own. In the aftermath of his revenge, Eun-joong searches for the truth and becomes caught between his two fathers and the woman he loves, Woo Ah-mi.

== Cast ==
=== Main characters ===
- Kim Jaewon as Ha Eun-joong
  - Jung Yoon-seok as 8-year-old Ha Eun-joong
  - Kim Hwi-soo as 5-year-old Ha Eun-joong

Detective at Gangnam police station. He became a detective to try to understand his father, an ex-detective, better. Why did his dad quit the force in 1988? What happened to him that he became a construction foreman? Why did he adopt him but never fully accept him as his son? One day, he begins investigating the death of Gong Ki-chan, a construction worker, and becomes entangled with the Jang family and the dead man's fiancée, Woo Ah-mi.

- Cho Jae-hyun as Ha Myung-geun

He is a loving father to Ha Eun-joong and Ha Soo-young. But he is also Ha Eun-joong's kidnapper. His wife died while giving birth to Soo-young and that left him caring for his two kids all by himself. Jang Tae-ha, chairman of Taeha Construction firm, was responsible for the shoddy construction of a building that collapsed, killing Myung-geun's son. When Tae-ha falsifies evidence to escape prosecution and doesn't show any remorse for the collapse, Myung-geun kidnapped Jang's son to get revenge. A few years later, filled with regret and his conscience eating at him, he decides to take Eun-joong back to his real family. Outside the house, he sees that they already have a son, the fake Eun-joong. He goes home with Eun-joong, and finally his heart is free to love him and raise him as his own.

- Park Sang-min as Jang Tae-ha

Chairman of Taeha conglomerate and one of the wealthiest individuals in Korea. He is the father of Jang Eun-joong and Jang Joo-ha. Stylish and trendy, he has a fiery temper when crossed.

- Shin Eun-kyung as Yoon Hwa-young

Tae-ha's estranged wife, a rational and cool-headed lawyer and head of her own firm. She was devastated when her son Eun-joong was abducted. To prevent Tae-ha from divorcing her and marrying his mistress Joo-ran, she adopted a boy from an orphanage and passed him off as Tae-ha's son Jang Eun-joong. But all these years, she is still searching for her real son.

- Jo Yoon-hee as Woo Ah-mi

She owns a lunch stand where many people preparing for the state police exams take cram courses. She wanted to become a prosecutor but soon realized that she could never pass the bar exam. Following the death of her husband and unborn daughter caused by Tae-ha, Myung-geun takes her in as he feels like it is his fault. She is determined to find justice for her husband, and along the way she begins to find out shocking secrets and develops feelings for Ha Eun-joong. She's honest, thoughtful, measured in her behavior, well-balanced and simple-minded. She cries a lot, talks a lot, gives loves and has a quick temper.

- Ki Tae-young as Jang Eun-joong
  - Jung Joon-won as 8-year-old Jang Eun-joong

Tae-ha and Hwa-young's son, he is a lawyer and becomes Ha Eun-joong's rival.

- Kim Hye-ri as Go Joo-ran

Tae-ha's mistress. She is determined to get rid of Tae-ha's wife and their son, Eun-joong, to get her position in Tae-ha's household and for her daughter's sake in Tae-ha's company.

- Kim Gyu-ri as Jang Joo-ha
  - Jo Min-ah as young Jang Joo-ha

Tae-ha and Joo-ran's daughter; she is a career woman who works for her father's company.

=== Supporting characters ===
- Jo Han-chul as Shin Kang-ho
- Choi Cheol-ho as Kang Joo-pil
- Ahn Suk-hwan as Jo Chi-gook
- Han Groo as Ha Soo-young
  - Lee Ye-sun as young Ha Soo-young

Myung-geun's daughter, Ha Eun-joong's sister.

- Park Jung-chul as Jo Jin-woong
- Jin Ju-hyung as Detective Goo
- Park Min-woo as hacker Batman
- Jo Hwi-joon as Ha Gun-young
- Kim Hyun as Go Joo-ran's aide
- Choi Yong-min as Taeha Construction worker
- Jung Ho-keun as Taeha Construction worker
- Jung Kyu-soo as section head Song Jae-moon
- Hong Jae-sung as Detective Lee
- Yang Jin-woo as Gong Ki-chan

Ah-mi's fiancé and father of their then-unborn child. Ki-chan was Myung-geun's protege and working as a construction worker. He discovers anomalies in the project and confronts Jang Tae-ha. He ends up dead on his supposed wedding day.

- Hong Yeo-jin as Ki-chan's mother
- Kim Hae-gon as inspection team leader
- Han Ki-won as Kim Joong-hyuk
- Choi Hee-seo as Secretary Moon

== Production ==
- The series is the third collaboration between screenwriter Bae Yoo-mi and director Kim Jin-man after Country Princess (2003) and Love Truly (2006).

== Ratings ==
In the table below, the blue numbers represent the lowest ratings and the red numbers represent the highest ratings.

Episode #	Original broadcast date	Average audience share			
Episode #	Original broadcast date	TNmS Ratings		AGB Nielsen	
Episode #	Original broadcast date	Nationwide	Seoul National Capital Area	Nationwide	Seoul National Capital Area
1	2013/06/29	15.8%	18.7%	16.4%	17.7%
2	2013/06/30	14.4%	16.6%	14.4%	16.2%
3	2013/07/06	16.0%	18.2%	14.9%	16.1%
4	2013/07/07	13.6%	14.3%	13.9%	14.7%
5	2013/07/13	16.6%	19.4%	16.3%	17.8%
6	2013/07/14	14.2%	16.9%	14.1%	15.5%
7	2013/07/20	14.8%	16.1%	15.5%	17.1%
8	2013/07/21	14.8%	16.1%	15.5%	17.3%
9	2013/07/27	16.2%	18.2%	14.9%	15.9%
10	2013/07/28	14.5%	15.7%	15.8%	18.0%
11	2013/08/03	14.6%	16.2%	14.3%	15.5%
12	2013/08/04	13.7%	15.5%	13.2%	14.5%
13	2013/08/10	14.1%	17.7%	15.8%	17.8%
14	2013/08/11	14.5%	16.8%	14.4%	16.2%
15	2013/08/17	13.8%	15.7%	16.5%	18.2%
16	2013/08/18	14.4%	16.8%	15.1%	17.4%
17	2013/08/24	15.1%	16.6%	17.2%	19.6%
18	2013/08/25	15.2%	17.4%	16.5%	18.4%
19	2013/08/31	15.9%	18.2%	16.5%	18.3%
20	2013/09/01	14.0%	16.2%	15.9%	17.7%
21	2013/09/07	16.6%	18.0%	18.2%	19.6%
22	2013/09/08	15.4%	17.2%	16.5%	17.8%
23	2013/09/14	16.7%	20.1%	17.3%	18.0%
24	2013/09/15	16.0%	18.7%	18.0%	19.2%
25	2013/09/21	16.8%	18.3%	16.6%	18.4%
26	2013/09/22	16.8%	19.0%	17.4%	18.8%
27	2013/09/28	15.0%	17.2%	14.9%	16.5%
28	2013/09/29	15.7%	17.2%	16.1%	17.8%
29	2013/10/05	14.3%	16.5%	15.4%	17.9%
30	2013/10/06	14.0%	15.9%	15.5%	17.1%
31	2013/10/12	12.1%	14.4%	13.0%	14.4%
32	2013/10/13	13.5%	14.6%	14.5%	15.8%
33	2013/10/19	14.3%	16.9%	15.7%	17.5%
34	2013/10/20	13.8%	15.4%	17.1%	18.8%
35	2013/10/26	14.7%	16.6%	14.7%	16.0%
36	2013/10/27	15.3%	16.5%	17.5%	19.2%
Average		14.9%	16.9%	15.7%	17.3%

== Awards and nominations ==
Year	Award	Category	Recipient	Result
2013	21st Korean Culture and Entertainment Awards	Top Excellence Award, Actor in Drama	Park Sang-min	Won
2013	21st Korean Culture and Entertainment Awards	Top Excellence Award, Actress in Drama	Shin Eun-kyung	Won
2013	26th Grimae Awards	Daesang (Grand Prize)	Jung Seung-woo, Kim Seon-cheol	Won
2013	26th Grimae Awards	Best Director	Kim Jin-man	Won
2013	26th Grimae Awards	Best Actor	Cho Jae-hyun	Won
2013	MBC Drama Awards	Drama of the Year	The Scandal	Nominated
2013	MBC Drama Awards	Top Excellence Award, Actor in a Special Project Drama	Cho Jae-hyun	Nominated
2013	MBC Drama Awards	Top Excellence Award, Actor in a Special Project Drama	Kim Jaewon	Won
2013	MBC Drama Awards	Top Excellence Award, Actress in a Special Project Drama	Shin Eun-kyung	Won
2013	MBC Drama Awards	Excellence Award, Actor in a Special Project Drama	Park Sang-min	Nominated
2013	MBC Drama Awards	Excellence Award, Actress in a Special Project Drama	Jo Yoon-hee	Nominated
2013	MBC Drama Awards	Excellence Award, Actress in a Special Project Drama	Kim Gyu-ri	Nominated
2013	MBC Drama Awards	Golden Acting Award, Actor	Cho Jae-hyun	Won
2014	50th Baeksang Arts Awards	Most Popular Actor (TV)	Kim Jaewon	Nominated
2014	9th Seoul International Drama Awards	Outstanding Korean Drama	The Scandal	Nominated
2014	9th Seoul International Drama Awards	Outstanding Korean Actor	Kim Jaewon	Nominated
2014	9th Seoul International Drama Awards	Outstanding Korean Drama OST	Last Love of My Life - The Position	Nominated
2014	9th Seoul International Drama Awards	Outstanding Korean Drama OST	Draw You Out - Ulala Session	Nominated
