= Bravo, My Love! =

2011 South Korean television series

- Promotional poster
- Also known as: Long Live Love; A Thousand Affections
- Genre: Romance; Comedy; Melodrama
- Written by: Park Hyun-joo
- Directed by: Joo Sung-woo
- Starring: Lee Bo-young; Lee Tae-sung; Jin Yi-han
- Ending theme: "사랑아 눈물아" by Kan Jong-wook and Kan Jong-woo
- Country of origin: South Korea
- Original language: Korean
- No. of episodes: 57

Production
- Producer: Kim Kyung-mi
- Production location: Korea
- Production company: Kim Jong-hak Production

Original release
- Network: Munhwa Broadcasting Corporation
- Release: July 16, 2011 – January 29, 2012

Bravo, My Love! (Korean: 애정만만세; RR: Aejeongmanmanse; lit. 'Hooray for Love') is a 2011 South Korean television series starring Lee Bo-young, Lee Tae-sung and Jin Yi-han. It aired on MBC from July 16, 2011, to January 29, 2012.

== Plot ==
Kang Jae-mi is the daughter of divorced parents. Her father Kang Hyung-do cheated on her mother Oh Jung-hee, which led to their divorce. He is now married to a much younger woman, Byun Joo-ri, but still has lingering feelings for his ex-wife.

Because of Hyung-do's infidelity and the trauma of breaking up their family, Jae-mi becomes skittish of smart and talented men like her father. So she ends up marrying "the obviously lacking" Han Jung-soo. But the marriage doesn't last, and Jae-mi divorces her loser husband.

Not ready to give up on their marriage, Jung-soo hires a lawyer to invalidate their divorce, the smart and sharp Byun Dong-woo. They begin as enemies, but Dong-woo falls for Jae-mi and he becomes one of her solid supporters as her success story unfolds. But she hesitates to begin a relationship with him because of his playboy past.

== Cast ==
- Lee Bo-young as Kang Jae-mi
- Lee Tae-sung as Byun Dong-woo
- Jin Yi-han as Han Jung-soo
- Bae Jong-ok as Oh Jung-hee
- Chun Ho-jin as Kang Hyung-do
- Byun Jung-soo as Byun Joo-ri
- Yoon Hyun-sook as Oh Jung-shim
- Ahn Sang-tae as Nam Dae-moon
- Kim Soo-mi as Crystal Park
- Park In-hwan as Byun Choon-nam
- Park Ha-young as Kang Se-ra
- Han Yeo-reum as Chae Hee-soo
- Kim Yoo-bin as Nam Da-reum
- Hwang Mi-seon as Soon-nyeo
- Im Se-mi as Kyung-mi
- Moon Hee-kyung as Sunny Park
- Kwon Min-jung as Director Moon
- Lee Seok-joon as Jung Se-Young
- Yeom Hyun-seo as young Kang Se-ra

Cameos

- Seo In-young as In-young (ep 1–3)
- Park Si-eun as Nam Ji-eun
- Cho Yeon-woo as Director Park
- Dana as Eun Dan-bi
- Uhm Hyun-kyung as Mi-ra
- Hong Seok-cheon as Julien
- Nam Hee-seok as policeman
- Nam Chang-hee as policeman
- Kim Young-ok as Da-reum's grandmother
- Song Chae-hwan as nun
- Son Seong-yoon as Kim Joo-hee
- Kwak Hyun-hwa as Na-young

== Awards ==
Award	Categories	Recipient(s)	Result	Citation(s)
2011 MBC Drama Awards	Excellence Award, Actress in a Miniseries	Lee Bo-young	Won	
2011 MBC Drama Awards	Golden Acting Award, Actress in a Miniseries	Bae Jong-ok	Won	
2011 MBC Drama Awards	Best Young Actress	Kim Yoo-bin	Won	
