= Gyebaek (TV series) =

- Promotional poster
- Also known as: Gyebaek, Warrior's Fate
- Genre: Historical; Action
- Written by: Kim Geun-hong
- Directed by: Jung Hyung-soo
- Starring: Lee Seo-jin; Cho Jae-hyun; Song Ji-hyo; Oh Yeon-soo
- Country of origin: South Korea
- Original language: Korean
- No. of episodes: 36

Production
- Executive producer: Han Hee (MBC)
- Producers: Kim Kwang soo Kim Dong gu Lee Sun sang
- Running time: 70 minutes
- Production companies: Gyebaek SPC; Curtain Call

Original release
- Network: MBC TV
- Release: July 25 – November 22, 2011

Gyebaek (Korean: 계백; Hanja: 階伯) is a 2011 South Korean period drama series, starring Lee Seo-jin, Cho Jae-hyun, Song Ji-hyo and Oh Yeon-soo . It aired on MBC TV from July 25 to November 22, 2011 on Mondays and Tuesdays at 21:55 for 36 episodes.

The series was filmed at MBC Dramia in Gyeonggi Province.

== Plot ==
Set in the Baekje kingdom in the mid-7th century, the drama chronicles the life and times of the storied warrior great General Gyebaek who is remembered in history for leading Baekje's last stand against the Silla in the Battle of Hwangsanbeol. Gyebaek dies at the final battle with Silla kingdom.

== Cast ==
- Lee Seo-jin as Gyebaek
  - Lee Hyun-woo as teen Gyebaek

The last general of the Bakjae, who was a great tactician of war and an honest man.

- Cho Jae-hyun as King Uija the last ruler of Bakjae
  - Choi Won-hong as child Uija
  - Noh Young-hak as teen Uija

The last king of Bakjae as the son of King Mu and Queen Seonhwa.

- Song Ji-hyo as Queen Eun-ko
  - Jeon Min-seo as child Eun-ko
  - Park Eun-bin as teen Eun-ko

Gyebaek's first love and Uija's wife.

- Oh Yeon-soo as Sa Taek-bi

Second wife of King Mu.

- Hyomin as Cho-young
  - Han Bo-bae as teen Cho-young

Gyebaek's Wife. She has a special ability in martial arts.

- Jin Tae-hyun as Gyoki
  - Nam Da-reum as child Gyo-ki
  - Seo Young-joo as teen Gyo-ki

Uija's half brother, the son of King Mu and Sa Taek-bi.

- Choi Jong-hwan as King Mu

A wise king who is the 20th ruler of Bakjae and father of King Uija

- Cha In-pyo as Mu-jin

Loyal subject of Bakjae and Gyebaeks father.

- Shin Eun-jung as Queen Seonhwa – The 1st wife of King Mu and mother of King Ui-Ja
- Jeon No-min as Sung-choong
- Yoon Da-hoon as Dok-kye
- Kim Yu-seok as Heung-soo
- Go Yoon-hoo as Dae-soo
  - Lee Poong-woon as teen Dae-soo
- Jang Hee-woong as Yong-soo
  - Lee Chan-ho as teen Yong-soo
- Jo Kyung-hoon as Baek-pa
- Yoon Won-seok as Po-deuk
- Park Sung-woong as Kim Yushin
- Ahn Gil-kang as Kwi-woon
- Jung Sung-mo as Yoon-choong
- Kim Byung-ki as Sa Taek Jeok Deok
- Kwon Yong-woon as Chun-dol
- Jo Sang-ki as Nam-jo
- Kim Joong-ki as Ki-mi
- Seo Beom-sik as Sa-gul
- Choi Jae-ho as Ui-jik
- Kim Dong-hee as Eun-sang
- Im Hyun-sik as Yeon Moon-jin
- Soon Dong-woon as Jin-kook
- Lee Byung-sik as Hyub-jong
- Jung Han-heon as Baek-eun
- Jung Ki-sung as Yeon Choong-min
- Chae Hee-jae as Cho Raeng-yi
- Lee Tae-kyung as vestal
- Lee Han-wi as Im-ja
- Oh Ji-young as Jung-hwa
- Choi Ran as Young-myo
- Ryu Je-hee as Hyo-so
- Park Yu-hwan as Buk-jo
- Kim Hye-sun as Eul-nyeo
- Kim Hyun-sung as Moon-geun
  - Lee Tae-ri (Note: Credited as Lee Min-ho.) as teen Moon-geun
- Kim Yoo-jin as Yeol-bae
- Lee Dong-kyu as Kim Chunchu

Next in line for the crown of Silla after Queen Seondeok

- Han Ji-woo as Yeon Tae-yeon
- Jung So-young as Myung-joo
- Kwak Min-seok as Mok Han-deok
- Kang Chul-sung as Yushin's senior

== Awards and nominations ==
Year	Award	Category	Recipient	Result	Ref
2011	MBC Drama Awards	PD Award	Choi Jong-hwan	Won	
2011	MBC Drama Awards	PD Award	Kim Jung-tae	Won	
2011	MBC Drama Awards	Best New Actress - Miniseries	Hyomin	Won	
2011	MBC Drama Awards	Excellence Actress Award -Miniseries	Song Ji-hyo	Nominated	
2011	DramaBeans Awards	Favorite historical drama of 2011	Gyebaek	Nominated	
2012	The 48th Baeksang Arts Awards	Male Popularity Award - TV	Lee Seo-jin	Nominated	
2012	The 48th Baeksang Arts Awards	Female Popularity Award - TV	Song Ji-hyo	Nominated	

== International broadcast ==
- Vietnam: VTC9 - Let's Viet - aired from January 23, 2015.
- Iran: IRIB Namayesh TV - aired from June 6, 2015 to July 15, 2015
- Thailand: 3 Family (in a network of Channel 3) - starting August 25, 2016
