= May Queen (TV series) =

2012 South Korean TV series

- Promotional poster
- Genre: Romance; Revenge; Melodrama
- Written by: Son Young-mok
- Directed by: Baek Ho-min
- Starring: Han Ji-hye; Kim Jaewon; Jae Hee
- Country of origin: South Korea
- Original language: Korean
- No. of episodes: 38

Production
- Executive producer: Lee Kang-hoon
- Producer: Jung Min-woo
- Production company: May Queen Pictures

Original release
- Network: MBC TV
- Release: August 18 – December 23, 2012

May Queen (Korean: 메이퀸) is a 2012 South Korean melodrama series about three people who experience ambition, revenge, betrayal and love, against the backdrop of the shipbuilding industry in Ulsan during Korea's modernization. It stars Han Ji-hye, Kim Jaewon and Jae Hee.

== Synopsis ==
The heroine Chun Hae-joo (Han Ji-hye) begins life in utter poverty. But despite being burdened with the secret past of her parents, she navigates treacherous waters and overcomes obstacles to achieve her dreams. Her childhood sweetheart Park Chang-hui (Jae Hee), son of the butler to a company chairman, also rises above his humble beginnings to become a successful prosecutor. Bright and playful Kang San (Kim Jaewon), the rival boss's privileged grandson, returns to South Korea after years abroad to find that he still carries a torch for Hae-joo.

The story starts with the murder of a scientist, Yoon Hak-su. When Hak-su received a phone call, his family is scared and worried. Wealthy company chairman, Jang Do-hyeon, is revealed to be the murderer of Hak-su. He being the superior of Yoon Hak-su wears a mask of grief and takes part in the memorial service, only to take Hak-su's wife, Lee Geum-hee, as his own wife. Her two-year-old daughter, Yoon Yu-jin, is robbed from her and given away to Chun Hong-cheol, an unemployed and debt-stricken military junior of Park Gi-cheol, butler to Jang Do-hyeon. Even though Do-hyeon orders for Geum Hee's two-year-old daughter, Yu-jin, to be killed, his butler Park Gi-cheol, is unable to do so because of his conscience.

The story moves forward and we see a 13 year old Hae-joo, daughter of the late Yoon Hak-su, living with a family that has a doting foster father Chun Hong-cheol, and an ill-mannered and complaining mother, as she believes Hae-ju to be the husband's illegitimate daughter. Park Chang-hui, the butler's 14-year-old son, who is ill-treated by the owner's son, Ill Mun, has his own share of grief. Also there is Kang San, a charming, carefree and cheerful heir of the rival group of Jang Do-hyeon, Haepung Shipping Group. He is the heir to his grandfather's business as his parents are dead. They all meet under one roof at the local school in Ulsan, where Kang San, Chang-hui and Ill Mun attend the same class. Due to their similar situations filled with sadness, Chang-hui and Hae-ju start liking each other. However Kang San starts falling for Hae-ju because of her welding ability and cheerful, positive personality.

Due to some tense events, Jang Do-hyeon starts to suspect that his wife's daughter was not killed by the butler 11 years ago and might turn out to be Hae-ju now. So, he orders the butler to solve the problem. Chang-hui's father, the butler, kills Hae-ju's foster father instead when Chun Hong-cheol puts himself between his daughter and the butler's stolen vehicle.

Jang Do-hyeon takes over Haepung Shipping Group through deceit and Kang San's grandfather is jailed unfairly. Kang San moves to America for further studies. Hae-ju's family also moves away from Ulsan to Geoje.

The story takes a leap in time, 15 years later we see Hae-ju and Park Chang-hui as adults dating. Jang Do-hyeon starts showering respect and praises toward Chang-hui as he is now a Public Prosecutor, a strict one, in hopes that he will protect his company, CheonJi Group. Chang-hui's father, the often abused butler, dreams that one day his son will become the son-in-law of Jang Do-hyeon by marrying Jang Do-hyeon's daughter, In Hwa. He is seen to be playing matchmaker too.

Jang Do-hyeon's company bags a contract with an American company which sends their Ship Inspector, Ryan Kang, to oversee the billions of Won project. He turns out to be Kang San who has a big idea for Jang Do-hyeon. He and Hae-ju met at a night club and when she attends an interview for CheonJi Group. She and San work together after he reveals himself. They work together to build a new Azimuth Thruster, so that San can take his Grandfather's company back. But all their efforts are thwarted by Jang Do-hyeon. Meanwhile, San loses his job, gets stabbed, and loses his grandfather, while Hae-joo struggles with her family poverty and her growing feelings towards Kang San.

Chang-hui under great humiliations and blackmailing from his father marries Jang Do-hyeon's daughter, In Hwa, who is in turn in love with Kang San. Chang-hui starts to play with Jang's daughter to get back at her father. He also learns that his father was behind Hae-ju's foster father's death.

After losing his only support, his grandfather, Kang San starts living on the streets and working at a construction site. From great provocation and support from Hae-ju, he moves into her house and starts anew. He also starts uncovering Hae-ju's father's death facts and finds out about her birth mother. After several attempts at uncovering Jang Do-hyeon's deceit by taking his wife's and Hae-ju's uncle's help, they succeed in getting evidence against Jang Do-hyeon. Between this, Chang-hui takes the seat of CheonJi Group and starts sinking low. It is revealed that Jang Do-hyeon is the murderer of Yoon Hak-su, and also that he is Hae-ju's biological father. Because of this revelation, Hae-ju rejects Kang San's marriage proposal, which he does after getting the patent rights registered for their invention. Later, however they both kiss and make up.

At the end, we see Chang-hui living with his father at a village while his wife, In Hwa, visits him to say that she loves him. Hae-ju and Kang San leave in their drillship to drill oil in the Pacific whilst he dons her finger with a huge diamond. Jang Do-hyeon, the cause of so much heartbreak, kills himself.

== Cast ==
=== Main ===
- Han Ji-hye as Chun Hae-joo
  - Kim Yoo-jung as young Hae-joo

She possesses natural confidence along with a sunny disposition. With an infectious curiosity, she has an enormous positive outlook on life. Her father was a janitor who loved to sail when he had the rare chance to, so she also became interested in boats, which led her to learn how to fix them. But the murder death of her father when she was a sixth grader revealed a secret about her past. She is unable to leave her family because of the sense of duty she feels towards her late father. As she turns into a young adult, she gets involved in offshore oil drilling and finds out that her real biological father committed his life to oil exploration.

- Kim Jaewon as Kang San/Ryan Gass Kang
  - Park Ji-bin as young Kang San

He is a friend of Chang-hui and the grandson of the founder of Haepung Group. Growing up with a silver spoon in his mouth, he was always cheerful and full of energy. He has a photographic memory that serves him well in the interests he pursues. He had a crush on Hae-joo just like his friend Chang-hui. After spending 15 years abroad, he returns to South Korea and is reunited with Hae-joo, and the old feelings he had for her return once again. Hae-joo's charm and bubbly personality gradually melts Kang San's heart.

- Jae Hee as Park Chang-hui
  - Park Gun-woo as young Chang-hui

He was Hae-joo's first boyfriend. Chang-hui is a perfectionist who keeps his guard up all the time. He is very smart but also a workaholic. Many people mistake him as the son of Cheonji Group's chairman when, in fact, he is the son of the chairman's butler. He chooses the daughter of the Cheonji chairman Iwa Ha over Hae-joo as his wife in order to become rich and end his parents' miserable life. This leads to him being on the opposite side in the rivalry between Cheonji Group and Haepung Group where Hae-joo and Kang San work alongside each other.

=== Supporting characters ===
- Son Eun-seo as Jang In-hwa
  - Jung Ji-so as young In-hwa
- Baek Seung-hee as Jo Min-gyeong

Hae-joo's family

- Ahn Nae-sang as Chun Hong-chul
- Geum Bo-ra as Jo Dal-soon
- Moon Ji-yoon as Chun Sang-tae
  - Kim Dong-hyeon as young Sang-tae
- Jung Hye-won as Chun Young-joo
  - Kang Ji-woo as young Young-joo
- Yoon Jung-eun as Chun Jin-joo

Cheonji Group

- Lee Deok-hwa as Jang Do-hyeon
- Yang Mi-kyung as Lee Geum-hee
- Yoon Jong-hwa as Jang Il-moon
  - Seo Young-joo as young Il-moon
- Kim Kyu-chul as Park Gi-chool
- Bae Sung-jong as Choi Wook-jin

Haepung Group

- Go In-beom as Kang Dae-pyung
- Lee Hoon as Yoon Jung-woo
- Kim Ji-young as Lee Bong-hee
- Sunwoo Jae-duk as Yoon Hak-soo

== Ratings ==
In the table below, the blue numbers represent the lowest ratings and the red numbers represent the highest ratings.

Episode #	Original broadcast date	Average audience share			
Episode #	Original broadcast date	TNmS Ratings		AGB Nielsen	
Episode #	Original broadcast date	Nationwide	Seoul National Capital Area	Nationwide	Seoul National Capital Area
1	2012/08/18	11.3%	12.1%	11.3%	12.5%
2	2012/08/19	11.6%	12.6%	10.8%	12.3%
3	2012/08/25	13.9%	15.4%	12.0%	13.1%
4	2012/08/26	14.2%	16.6%	12.7%	13.9%
5	2012/09/01	14.5%	15.6%	13.7%	14.7%
6	2012/09/02	16.6%	19.0%	14.6%	15.6%
7	2012/09/08	17.4%	18.9%	14.6%	15.5%
8	2012/09/09	16.2%	18.8%	15.4%	17.5%
9	2012/09/15	17.9%	19.6%	16.8%	17.6%
10	2012/09/16	17.4%	19.1%	17.7%	18.7%
11	2012/09/22	20.0%	22.5%	18.6%	19.7%
12	2012/09/23	18.7%	21.2%	17.1%	18.1%
13	2012/09/29	17.7%	20.5%	14.6%	15.9%
14	2012/09/30	15.3%	16.4%	13.1%	14.5%
15	2012/10/06	20.8%	23.1%	17.7%	18.9%
16	2012/10/07	18.7%	21.5%	17.4%	18.1%
17	2012/10/13	19.2%	21.3%	18.9%	20.1%
18	2012/10/14	19.1%	21.8%	17.6%	18.8%
19	2012/10/20	19.4%	22.1%	18.7%	19.9%
20	2012/10/21	19.8%	22.9%	18.0%	19.3%
21	2012/10/27	19.5%	21.6%	18.2%	19.4%
22	2012/10/28	19.6%	21.9%	17.8%	18.5%
23	2012/11/03	18.9%	21.3%	18.5%	20.0%
24	2012/11/04	19.6%	22.0%	17.8%	19.3%
25	2012/11/10	19.8%	21.6%	18.9%	20.4%
26	2012/11/11	19.2%	21.4%	18.0%	19.0%
27	2012/11/17	19.2%	21.5%	19.1%	21.3%
28	2012/11/18	19.3%	21.7%	19.3%	20.3%
29	2012/11/24	21.5%	25.4%	20.0%	21.1%
30	2012/11/25	22.0%	24.8%	21.0%	22.6%
31	2012/12/01	24.2%	24.8%	22.7%	23.9%
32	2012/12/02	24.5%	25.5%	23.6%	24.6%
33	2012/12/08	24.3%	26.2%	23.3%	24.4%
34	2012/12/09	24.4%	27.6%	23.5%	24.9%
35	2012/12/15	23.0%	25.3%	21.7%	22.1%
36	2012/12/16	19.4%	21.1%	20.6%	21.8%
37	2012/12/22	22.4%	23.8%	20.2%	21.7%
38	2012/12/23	25.9%	29.4%	26.4%	27.5%
Average		19.12%	21.26%	17.94%	19.14%

== Production ==
It was reported on October 31, 2012, that male lead Kim Jaewon injured the muscle of his right thigh while shooting a quarreling scene. He was taken to hospital for examination at the completion of filming, received treatment and has since returned to the regular shooting schedule.

== Awards ==
2012 20th Korean Culture and Entertainment Awards

- Top Excellence Award, Actress: Han Ji-hye
- Hallyu Star Award: Kim Jaewon

2012 1st K-Drama Star Awards

- Best Young Actor: Park Gun-tae
- Best Young Actress: Kim Yoo-jung

2012 MBC Drama Awards

- Top Excellence Award, Actress in a Serial Drama: Han Ji-hye
- Top Excellence Award, Actor in a Serial Drama: Kim Jaewon
- Excellence Award, Actor in a Serial Drama: Jae Hee
- Best Young Actress: Kim Yoo-jung
- Golden Acting Award, Actor: Lee Deok-hwa
- Golden Acting Award, Actress: Yang Mi-kyung
- Writer of the Year Award: Son Young-mok
