= The Duo =

2011 South Korean historical drama series

- Promotional poster for The Duo
- Also known as: Mate
- Hangul: 짝패
- RR: Jjakpae
- MR: Tchakp'ae
- Genre: Historical; Romance; Comedy; Action
- Written by: Kim Woon-kyung
- Directed by: Im Tae-woo
- Starring: Chun Jung-myung; Lee Sang-yoon; Han Ji-hye; Seo Hyun-jin
- Composer: Bang Joon Seok (방준석)
- Country of origin: South Korea
- Original language: Korean
- No. of episodes: 32

Production
- Executive producer: Choi Yi-sup MBC
- Producer: Moon Jung Soo
- Production company: Pan Entertainment

Original release
- Network: Munhwa Broadcasting Corporation
- Release: February 7 – May 24, 2011

The Duo (Korean: 짝패; RR: Jjakpae) is a 2011 South Korean historical drama series, starring Chun Jung-myung, Lee Sang-yoon, Han Ji-hye and Seo Hyun-jin. It aired on MBC from February 7 to May 24, 2011, on Mondays and Tuesdays at 21:55 for 32 episodes.

Filmed at MBC Dramia in Gyeonggi Province, the series examines how class determines fate during the Joseon era through two men who swap lives. Switched at birth, Chun-doong and Gwi-dong grow up living each other's lives. Nobleman's son Chun-doong endures great hardships in the lowest caste of society, and becomes a vigilante who steals from the rich. Beggar's son Gwi-dong grows up in a wealthy noble family, and becomes a police chief. Living on opposite sides of the law, their paths cross again when they both fall for the same woman; played by Chun, Lee and Han respectively.

== Plot ==
Around the time of late Joseon dynasty (1392–1910) when hierarchy between nobles and slaves started to fall apart and riots were common among peasants, two men were born on the same day and at the same time. Chun Dung who grew up in a beggar's quarters (although born as a noble) with no knowledge of his parents, dreams of "making this world a better place" by taking part in the peasants' riot while Gwi Dong who was raised in a noble life (though he was born as a beggar), serves as a police official, fights against corruption within the government and speaks for the weak. Although both give their hearts to the same woman, they become the greatest duo ever in order to reform the problematic world.

The background of the drama is not set in a grand palace but an everyday market and talks not of the success of a great hero but the agony of common people. The Duo portrays the everyday lives and loves of the commoners and outcasts during 19th century Korea: Slaves, beggars, leather shoemakers, thieves, street bums and butchers, people who were poor yet good at heart. It is centered on the humanism and sentiments of those whose life stories have often been neglected in the typical "royal family centered" dramas.

== Cast ==
=== Main characters ===
- Chun Jung-myung as Chun-doong
  - Noh Young-hak as young Chun-doong

He was born as a noble but lives Gwi-dong's life as a beggar and later becomes a heroic outlaw.

- Lee Sang-yoon as Gwi-dong
  - Choi Woo-shik as young Gwi-dong

He was born as a beggar but lives his life as a noble and later becomes a police chief.

- Han Ji-hye as Dong-nyeo
  - Jin Se-yeon as young Dong-nyeo

The daughter of a village school teacher, she is learned and clever.

- Seo Hyun-jin as Dal-yi
  - Lee Sun-young as young Dal-yi

Ever since she was a kid, she has always loved Gwi-dong who was from a class different and more importantly, higher than hers.

=== Supporting characters ===
- Lee Moon-sik as Jang Kkok-ji
- Jung In-gi as Soe-dol
- Yoon Yoo-sun as Mak-soon
- Kwon Oh-joong as Kang Po-soo
- Seo Yi-sook as Keun-nyeo
- Ahn Yeon-hong as Ja Geun-nyeon
- Jung Kyung-ho as Kkul-tteok
- Cha Do-jin as Jin-deuk
  - Park Dae-won as young Jin-deuk
- Lee Shin-sung as Do-gap
  - Choi Woo-hyuk as young Do-gap
- Kim Ki-bang as Gom-chi
- Jo Chang-geun as Poong-gae
- Kim Kyung-jin as Mal-son
- Choi Jong-hwan as Dr. Kim Jae-ik
- Im Chae-won as Lady Kwon
- Lee Seol-ah as Geum-ok
  - Kim So-hyun as young Geum-ok
- Kim Myung-soo as Hyun-gam
- Jung Han-hun as Mr. Park
- Ra Mi-ran as Eob Deuk-ne
- Lee Ji-soo as Sam-wol
- Kang Shin-il as Sung Cho-shi
- Baek Jong-hak as Yoo Sun-dal
- Im Hyun-sik as old man Hwang
- Yoon Yong-hyun as Choon-bo
- Gong Hyung-jin as Gong Po-gyo
- Jung Chan as Jo Sun-dal
- Jang Yong-hee as Pan-sool
  - Chi Woo as young Pan-sool
- Im Dae-ho as Beot-deul's father
- Yang Mi-kyung as Chun-doong's mother
- Yoon Hong-bin as young Won-chil
- Baek Sung-heum as young Beot-deul
- Kim Woo-suk as young Se-gap

== Ratings ==
The Duo received solid ratings, averaging 13.0 percent on Total National Multimedia Statistics' (TNmS) chart and 16.7 percent on AGB Nielsen Media Research's (AGB) poll, coming in first in its primetime slot several times during its run.

== International broadcast ==
- It aired in Vietnam on Style TV, beginning August 16, 2014.
