= Mi-rae =

- Hangul: 미래
- RR: Mirae
- MR: Mirae

Mi-rae is a Korean given name.

== People ==
Korean people with this name include:

- Kim Mi-rae (born 2001), North Korean diver
- Yoon Mi-rae (born Natasha Shanta Reid, 1981), American-born South Korean rapper and singer

== Fictional characters ==
Fictional characters with this name include

- Cha Mi-rae, in the 2006 South Korean television series Fireworks
- Yoo Mi-rae, in the 2006 South Korean television drama Great Inheritance
- Na Mi-rae, in the 2008 South Korean television drama Jungle Fish
- Shin Mi-rae, in the 2009 South Korean television series The City Hall
- Mi-rae, in the South Korean-Japanese romantic-drama film After the Banquet
- Mi-rae, in the South Korean rerun (2009-present) year-end drama Father's House
- Yoon Mi-rae, in the 2012 South Korean television series How Long I've Kissed
- Cha Mi-rae, in the 2013 South Korean television drama Passionate Love
- Kim Mi-rae, in the 2013 South Korean television series 7th Grade Civil Servant
- Lee Mi-rae, in the 2013 South Korean sports-comedy film The King of Jokgu
- Na Mi-rae, in the 2013 South Korean television series Marry Him If You Dare
- Choi Mi-rae, in the 2014 South Korean television series Schoolgirl Detectives
- Hong Mi-rae, in the 2014 South Korean television series Only Love
- Hong Mi-rae, in the 2015 South Korean television series Glamorous Temptation
- Lee Mi-rae, in the 2015 South Korean television series Office
- Mi-rae, in the 2016 South Korean comedy-drama film Familyhood
- Byun Mi-rae, in the 2016 South Korean television series Secrets of Women
- Cha Mi-rae, in the 2016 South Korean television series Super Daddy Yeol
- Ryu Mi-rae, in the 2017 South Korean television series Duel
- Kang Mi-rae, in the 2018 South Korean television series Gangnam Beauty
- Nam Mi-rae, in the 2018 South Korean morning soap opera Lady Cha Dal-rae's Lover
- Kim Mi-rae, in the 2018 South Korean television series A Poem a Day
- Kang Mi-rae, in the 2019 South Korean television series Doctor John
- Yoon Mi-rae, in the 2019 South Korean television series I Wanna Hear Your Song
- Noh Mi-rae, in the 2020 South Korean-Chinese web drama How Are U Bread
- Seo Mi-rae, in the 2026 South Korean television series Boyfriend on Demand

== See also ==
- List of Korean given names
