= Beyond the Clouds (TV series) =

South Korean television series

- Promotional poster
- Hangul: 태양은 가득히
- Hanja: 太陽은 가득히
- Lit.: The Full Sun
- RR: Taeyangeun gadeukhi
- MR: T'aeyangŭn kadŭkhi
- Genre: Romance; Melodrama
- Written by: Heo Sung-hye
- Directed by: Bae Kyung-soo; Kim Jung-hyun
- Starring: Yoon Kye-sang; Han Ji-hye; Cho Jin-woong; Kim Yoo-ri
- Music by: Choi In-hee
- Country of origin: South Korea
- Original language: Korean
- No. of episodes: 16

Production
- Executive producers: Bae Kyung-soo; Kyung Myung-chul; Park Jae-sam
- Producers: Lee Na-jeong; Park Woo-ram
- Production locations: Korea; Thailand
- Running time: 60 minutes
- Production companies: Celltrion Entertainment; (formerly Dream E&M)

Original release
- Network: KBS2
- Release: February 17 – April 14, 2014

Beyond the Clouds (Korean: 태양은 가득히; RR: Taeyangeun gadeukhi; lit. 'The Full Sun') is a 2014 South Korean television series starring Yoon Kye-sang, Han Ji-hye and Cho Jin-woong. It aired on KBS2 from February 17 to April 14, 2014, on Mondays and Tuesdays at 21:55 for 16 episodes.

== Plot ==
Jung Se-ro (Yoon Kye-sang) is a hardworking young man who works multiple part-time jobs while studying for the foreign civil service exam. His father is a petty criminal and a con man, and their family lives a transient life because of his deals, currently staying in Thailand.

Despite wanting an honest life for himself, Se-ro's dreams are shattered on the night of a glamorous jewel exhibition opening in Bangkok. His father dies in an incident involving stolen diamonds, and because Se-ro was at the scene when another man was shot, he is accused and arrested for murder. After spending five years in a Thai prison, upon his release he takes up a new identity and becomes a con man just like his father. He joins a ring of jewel smugglers led by Park Kang-jae (Cho Jin-woong), with whom he shares a brotherly bond. Kang-Jae was raised like a son by Se-ro's father, who taught him all the tricks of the trade. But Kang-Jae has harbored a lifelong jealousy towards the real son, which is stoked further when the woman he loves, smuggling accomplice Seo Jae-in (Kim Yoo-ri) also falls for Se-ro.

Then Se-ro meets Han Young-won (Han Ji-hye), the cold-hearted heiress to a jewelry brand. She was madly in love with her fiancé Gong Woo-jin (Song Jong-ho), and had closed herself off after his death. But Se-ro draws her out into the world, while Young-won gives him a reason to live when he had all but given up. They fall in love, not knowing that the man Se-ro was accused of killing had been Young-won's fiancé. His love for her becomes his punishment, but also his salvation.

== Cast ==
- Yoon Kye-sang as Jung Se-ro
- Han Ji-hye as Han Young-won
- Cho Jin-woong as Park Kang-jae
  - Park Joon-mok as young Kang-jae
- Kim Yoo-ri as Seo Jae-in
- Lee Dae-yeon as Jung Do-joon, Se-ro's father
- Jung Won-joong as Shin Pil-do
- Kim Young-ok as Hong Soon-ok
- Lee Jae-won as Hong
- Woo Hyun as Hama
- Kim Yoon-sung as Cha Pyo
- Song Jong-ho as Gong Woo-jin, Young-won's fiancé
- Kim Yeong-cheol as Han Tae-oh, Young-won's father
- Jeon Mi-seon as Baek Nan-joo, Young-won's stepmother
- Son Ho-jun as Han Young-joon, Young-won's half brother
- Kim Sun-kyung as Section chief Min
- Ahn Ji-hyun as Kang Han-na
- Song Young-kyu as Kang Hak-soo
- Lee Sang-hoon as Secretary Ahn
- Cho Seung-hee as Jewelry saleswoman (cameo)

== Ratings ==
In the table below, the blue numbers represent the lowest ratings and the red numbers represent the highest ratings.

Episode #	Original broadcast date	Average audience share			
Episode #	Original broadcast date	TNmS Ratings		AGB Nielsen	
Episode #	Original broadcast date	Nationwide	Seoul National Capital Area	Nationwide	Seoul National Capital Area
1	17 February 2014	4.0%	4.3%	3.7%	3.8%
2	17 February 2014	5.3%	5.5%	5.1%	5.9%
3	24 February 2014	3.5%	4.1%	3.8%	4.6%
4	25 February 2014	4.5%	4.6%	5.2%	6.1%
5	3 March 2014	3.7%	4.5%	3.3%	3.6%
6	4 March 2014	4.2%	4.8%	3.6%	3.9%
7	10 March 2014	3.0%	3.5%	2.6%	2.7%
8	11 March 2014	3.6%	3.0%	3.0%	3.3%
9	17 March 2014	3.1%	4.0%	3.0%	3.6%
10	18 March 2014	3.6%	4.6%	3.5%	4.1%
11	24 March 2014	3.0%	3.1%	3.0%	3.1%
12	25 March 2014	2.6%	3.4%	2.5%	3.1%
13	31 March 2014	1.9%	2.5%	2.3%	2.7%
14	1 April 2014	2.0%	3.0%	2.2%	2.3%
15	7 April 2014	2.7%	3.5%	2.6%	3.3%
16	8 April 2014	2.8%	3.5%	2.7%	2.6%
Average		3.3%	3.9%	3.3%	3.7%
