= My Boyfriend Is Type B =

My Boyfriend is Type B
- Theatrical poster
- Directed by: Choi Suk-won
- Written by: Choi Suk-won; Seo Dong-won; Lee Yun-jin
- Produced by: Kim Doo-chan; Park Hyung-jun; Song Soo-keun
- Starring: Lee Dong-gun; Han Ji-hye
- Cinematography: Kim Dong-eun
- Edited by: Park Gok-ji
- Music by: Kim Yeong-gwan
- Production company: Cinema Zenith
- Distributed by: Lotte Entertainment
- Release date: February 3, 2005
- Running time: 96 minutes
- Country: South Korea
- Language: Korean
- Box office: US$7,538,404

My Boyfriend is Type B (Korean: B형 남자친구) is a 2005 South Korean romantic comedy film. The basic premise of the film comes from the blood type personality theory, which claims that a person's blood type can determine their personality traits. The heroine is type A (conservative and introverted) while her love interest is type B (passionate and irresponsible).

== Plot ==
Lee Dong-gun portrays title character Young-bin, a handsome but obnoxious young man who begins the film by breaking off a relationship in a most impolite way: after waiting in a parked car so Young-bin won't get a ticket, the girlfriend reads him the riot act upon his return, prompting Young-bin to slip into the driver's seat, break up with her, and speed off, leaving his new ex-girlfriend stranded in the parking lot. From the get-go, Young-bin is not exactly a class act.

On the opposite side of the spectrum is the beautiful Ha-mi (Han Ji-hye), a meek university student looking for true love, but never seeming to find it. As is typical in this kind of film, the two meet purely by chance: Ha-mi accidentally text messages Young-bin before literally bumping into him. Ha-mi, feeling that their fortuitous meeting is a sign that they might be destined for one another, decides to pal around with Young-bin and see if there's any chemistry between them. Taken by Ha-mi's sincerity and her willingness to pick up the check, Young-bin jumps at the opportunity.

But Ha-mi's cousin, Chae-young (Shin Yi) isn't quite so enraptured with Young-bin and tries to dissuade Ha-mi from pursuing him. The thing is, Chae-young is a professional dating consultant and a strong subscriber to blood type personality theory. According to her, any relationship between the mismatched duo would be doomed to failure because Young-bin is a type-B male, which supposedly makes him arrogant, hardheaded, and generally a jerk, whereas Ha-mi is a type-A female, one who supposedly can't help being timid and obedient. But while Chae-young predicts impending doom, the happy couple try to give love a shot, ignoring their supposed blood type incompatibility.

== Cast ==
- Lee Dong-gun as Young-bin, a callous type B young man, who is secretly experiencing financial trouble.
- Han Ji-hye as Ha-mi, a mild-mannered type A college student who is searching for true love.
- Shin Yi as Chae-young, Han-i's cousin and professional dating consultant. She warns Ha-mi against dating a type B man.
