= The Gentlemen of Wolgyesu Tailor Shop =

2016 South Korean television series

- Promotional poster
- Hangul: 월계수 양복점 신사들
- Hanja: 月桂樹 洋服店 紳士들
- RR: Wolgyesu yangbokjeom sinsadeul
- MR: Wŏlgyesu yangbokchŏm sinsadŭl
- Genre: Family; Drama; Comedy
- Created by: KBS Drama Production
- Written by: Goo Hyun-sook
- Directed by: Hwang In-hyuk
- Creative directors: Kim Hyung-joon; Park So-yeon
- Starring: Lee Dong-gun; Jo Yoon-hee; Shin Goo; Cha In-pyo; Choi Won-young; Hyun Woo; Lee Se-young
- Country of origin: South Korea
- Original language: Korean
- No. of episodes: 54

Production
- Executive producer: Bae Kyung-soo
- Producers: Kang Min-kyung; Kim Hee-yeol
- Camera setup: Single-camera
- Running time: 65 minutes
- Production company: Pan Entertainment

Original release
- Network: KBS2
- Release: August 27, 2016 – February 26, 2017

The Gentlemen of Wolgyesu Tailor Shop (Korean: 월계수 양복점 신사들; lit. 'Gentlemen of the Laurel Tree Suit Tailor') is a 2016 South Korean television series starring Lee Dong-gun, Jo Yoon-hee, Shin Goo, Cha In-pyo, Choi Won-young, Lee Se-young, and Hyun Woo. The series aired on KBS2 every Saturday and Sunday from 7:55 p.m. to 9:15 p.m. (KST). The series served as Kim Young-ae's final work, as she died almost 2 months after the final episode.

== Synopsis ==
The Gentlemen of Wolgyesu Tailor Shop is about a Tailor's shop that has been handed down from father to son and is about 50 years old. The Grandfather is desperate to keep the Tailor shop in the family, however his son is not keen and works for a corporate tailor's. The son is also married to the late Chairman's daughter. Once the Chairman dies, a host of power struggles between his wife and her brother and Stepmother ensue. Meanwhile, the Grandfather of the Tailor's shop decides to go on a sabbatical making made to measure suits for the poor and abandoning the Tailor's shop to his wife, daughter and 2 loyal employees. He leaves a letter asking them to sell the shop as he doesn't have the heart to. Eventually, the shop is placed in the hands of a former employee who agrees to run it until the Grandfather returns. The characters share their friendship as well as love at their workplace. Their values are in a sharp contrast to a corporate company that employs many and is seeped in many power struggles.

== Cast ==
=== Main ===
- Lee Dong-gun as Lee Dong-jin
- Jo Yoon-hee as Nah Yeon-shil
- Shin Goo as Lee Man-sool
- Cha In-pyo as Bae Sam-do
  - Cha Ji-hoon as young Bae Sam-do
- Choi Won-young as Sung Tae-pyung / Sung Joon
- Hyun Woo as Kang Tae-yang

=== Supporting ===
==== People around Lee Dong-jin ====
- Kim Young-ae as Choi Gok-ji
- Oh Hyun-kyung as Lee Dong-sook
- Pyo Ye-jin as Kim Da-jung

==== People around Nah Yeon-shil ====
- Ji Seung-hyun as Hong Ki-pyo
- Jung Lyung-soon as Kyung-ja
- Lee Jung-eun as Geum Chon-daek

==== People around Bae Sam-do ====
- Ra Mi-ran as Bok Seon-nyeo

==== People from Meesa Apparel ====
- Park Joon-geum as Go Eun-sook
- Goo Jae-yee as Min Hyo-joo
- Lee Se-young as Min Hyo-won
- Park Eun-seok as Min Hyo-sang
- Cha Joo-young as Choi Ji-yeon

==== Extended ====
- Choi Song-hyun as Lee Yeon-hee
- Kim Ji-eun as Choi Ji-yeon's colleague announcer
- Lee Ga-ryeong as Jo An-na
- Yang Dae-hyuk as Yoo Dae-ri
- Sung Ki-yoon as Park Boo-jang
- Han Seung-hyun as Nah Dae-ri
- Lee Joo-seok
- Baek Hyun-joo as 은숙네 가사도우미
- Kim Kwang-in
- Kim Da-sung as Geon Dal
- Yang Ji-in
- Son Joo-yeon
- Park Hee-gon
- Song In-seob
- Lim Jae-geun
- Kang Chan-yang
- Song Ha-rim
- Gong Yoon-chan
- Kwon Hong-seok
- Kim Sa-hoon
- Park Seo-bin
- Gong Jae-won
- Kim Mi-ran
- Kang Jung-koo
- Heo Sun-haeng
- Yoon Mi-hyang
- Lim Jung-ok
- Cha Sang-mi
- Yoon Ye-in
- Seo Jung-joon
- Song Jae-ryong
- Oh Jung-soo
- Lee Jae-wook
- Choi Beom-ho as Choi Cheol-ho's lawyer
- Choi Young
- Yang Dae-hyuk
- Seo Myung-chan
- Kim Tae-rang
- Kim Jae-heum
- Won Jong-seon
- Ahn Soo-ho
- Kang Chul-sung
- Lee Sae-ro-mi
- Yoo Geum
- Kim Doo-young
- Yoo Yong-bum
- Lee Jung-sung
- Kim Tae-young
- Jang Moon-suk
- Lee Seo-yool
- Choi Nam-wook
- Ji Sung-keun
- Son Gun-woo
- Park Chan-hong

== Original soundtrack ==
No.	Title	Artist	Length
1.	"Say Say Say"	Ji Soo (지수)	3:31
2.	"Hey Love"	Lee Yu Lim (이유림)	3:41
3.	"스잔나의 손수건" (special track 1)	Choi Won Young	2:48
4.	"I'm Coming" (special track 2)	Choi Won Young	4:02

== Ratings ==
- In this table, The blue numbers represent the lowest ratings and the red numbers represent the highest ratings.
- NR denotes that the drama did not rank in the top 20 daily programs on that date.

Episode #	Original broadcast date	Average audience share			
Episode #	Original broadcast date	TNmS Ratings		AGB Nielsen	
Episode #	Original broadcast date	Nationwide	Seoul National Capital Area	Nationwide	Seoul National Capital Area
1	August 27, 2016	23.7% (1st)	21.4% (1st)	22.4% (1st)	22.2% (1st)
2	August 28, 2016	27.1% (1st)	25.3% (1st)	28.1% (1st)	27.7% (1st)
3	September 3, 2016	23.8% (1st)	22.4% (1st)	22.2% (1st)	21.5% (1st)
4	September 4, 2016	27.6% (1st)	26.3% (1st)	27.6% (1st)	26.5% (1st)
5	September 10, 2016	24.6% (1st)	21.8% (1st)	23.9% (1st)	23.6% (1st)
6	September 11, 2016	28.1% (1st)	24.9% (1st)	30.2% (1st)	30.5% (1st)
7	September 17, 2016	25.5% (1st)	21.4% (1st)	25.5% (1st)	25.3% (1st)
8	September 18, 2016	28.7% (1st)	25.3% (1st)	29.4% (1st)	28.9% (1st)
9	September 24, 2016	24.5% (1st)	22.1% (1st)	24.8% (1st)	23.4% (1st)
10	September 25, 2016	28.2% (1st)	25.7% (1st)	28.7% (1st)	28.3% (1st)
11	October 1, 2016	24.6% (1st)	21.9% (1st)	23.2% (1st)	21.5% (1st)
12	October 2, 2016	28.6% (1st)	25.5% (1st)	29.3% (1st)	29.8% (1st)
13	October 8, 2016	24.9% (1st)	21.9% (1st)	22.9% (1st)	20.9% (2nd)
14	October 9, 2016	29.1% (1st)	25.3% (1st)	29.2% (1st)	28.6% (1st)
15	October 15, 2016	23.1% (1st)	20.4% (1st)	23.6% (1st)	22.6% (1st)
16	October 16, 2016	30.7% (1st)	28.2% (1st)	31.5% (1st)	31.6% (1st)
17	October 22, 2016	23.6% (1st)	21.3% (1st)	23.7% (1st)	23.2% (1st)
18	October 23, 2016	30.0% (1st)	28.4% (1st)	31.0% (1st)	30.8% (1st)
19	October 29, 2016	24.4% (1st)	23.1% (1st)	24.1% (1st)	23.9% (1st)
20	October 30, 2016	29.5% (1st)	27.8% (1st)	29.8% (1st)	29.7% (1st)
21	November 5, 2016	23.8% (1st)	22.3% (1st)	24.5% (1st)	24.4% (1st)
22	November 6, 2016	30.4% (1st)	27.4% (1st)	31.5% (1st)	31.4% (1st)
23	November 12, 2016	22.2% (1st)	20.1% (1st)	23.3% (1st)	23.1% (1st)
24	November 13, 2016	30.9% (1st)	29.0% (1st)	31.2% (1st)	31.1% (1st)
25	November 19, 2016	26.8% (1st)	24.0% (1st)	27.1% (1st)	26.7% (1st)
26	November 20, 2016	31.4% (1st)	30.4% (1st)	31.8% (1st)	31.2% (1st)
27	November 26, 2016	28.0% (1st)	25.4% (1st)	26.8% (1st)	27.0% (1st)
28	November 27, 2016	32.5% (1st)	32.0% (1st)	32.0% (1st)	31.9% (1st)
29	December 3, 2016	23.9% (1st)	23.1% (1st)	24.5% (1st)	24.3% (1st)
30	December 4, 2016	31.5% (1st)	30.8% (1st)	32.5% (1st)	33.4% (1st)
31	December 10, 2016	23.8% (1st)	23.2% (1st)	24.1% (1st)	23.1% (1st)
32	December 11, 2016	31.7% (1st)	31.1% (1st)	32.4% (1st)	32.1% (1st)
33	December 17, 2016	24.4% (1st)	23.2% (1st)	25.0% (1st)	24.6% (1st)
34	December 18, 2016	31.9% (1st)	31.0% (1st)	33.0% (1st)	32.8% (1st)
35	December 24, 2016	23.7% (1st)	22.9% (1st)	22.0% (1st)	21.8% (1st)
36	December 25, 2016	31.4% (1st)	31.5% (1st)	32.5% (1st)	32.8% (1st)
37	December 31, 2016	23.8% (1st)	22.7% (1st)	25.1% (1st)	25.7% (1st)
38	January 1, 2017	32.8% (1st)	32.5% (1st)	34.9% (1st)	34.8% (1st)
39	January 7, 2017	26.9% (1st)	26.6% (1st)	27.4% (1st)	27.7% (1st)
40	January 8, 2017	34.6% (1st)	34.1% (1st)	35.1% (1st)	35.3% (1st)
41	January 14, 2017	29.3% (1st)	28.0% (1st)	29.0% (1st)	27.6% (1st)
42	January 15, 2017	33.7% (1st)	32.0% (1st)	36.2% (1st)	35.9% (1st)
43	January 21, 2017	25.3% (1st)	24.6% (1st)	27.6% (1st)	27.3% (1st)
44	January 22, 2017	33.8% (1st)	33.0% (1st)	34.8% (1st)	34.2% (1st)
45	January 28, 2017	25.3% (1st)	23.3% (1st)	26.4% (1st)	26.2% (1st)
46	January 29, 2017	30.0% (1st)	28.9% (1st)	32.1% (1st)	32.1% (1st)
47	February 4, 2017	29.8% (1st)	29.9% (1st)	30.8% (1st)	30.4% (1st)
48	February 5, 2017	33.6% (1st)	33.6% (1st)	35.4% (1st)	34.9% (1st)
49	February 11, 2017	29.7% (1st)	27.9% (1st)	31.3% (1st)	31.6% (1st)
50	February 12, 2017	34.2% (1st)	32.7% (1st)	36.0% (1st)	35.5% (1st)
51	February 18, 2017	29.4% (1st)	29.0% (1st)	32.0% (1st)	31.2% (1st)
52	February 19, 2017	32.0% (1st)	32.9% (1st)	35.7% (1st)	35.9% (1st)
53	February 25, 2017	29.3% (1st)	28.3% (1st)	30.9% (1st)	30.3% (1st)
54	February 26, 2017	32.9% (1st)	31.6% (1st)	35.8% (1st)	35.6% (1st)
Average		28.2%	26.7%	28.3%	28.5%

== Awards and nominations ==
Year	Award	Category	Recipient	Result
2016	30th KBS Drama Awards	Top Excellence Award, Actor	Lee Dong-gun	Nominated
2016	30th KBS Drama Awards	Top Excellence Award, Actor	Cha In-pyo	Nominated
2016	30th KBS Drama Awards	Top Excellence Award, Actress	Jo Yoon-hee	Nominated
2016	30th KBS Drama Awards	Excellence Award, Actor in a Serial Drama	Lee Dong-gun	Won
2016	30th KBS Drama Awards	Excellence Award, Actor in a Serial Drama	Cha In-pyo	Nominated
2016	30th KBS Drama Awards	Excellence Award, Actress in a Serial Drama	Jo Yoon-hee	Won
2016	30th KBS Drama Awards	Excellence Award, Actress in a Serial Drama	Oh Hyun-kyung	Nominated
2016	30th KBS Drama Awards	Best Supporting Actor	Choi Won-young	Nominated
2016	30th KBS Drama Awards	Best Supporting Actress	Ra Mi-ran	Won
2016	30th KBS Drama Awards	Best New Actor	Hyun Woo	Nominated
2016	30th KBS Drama Awards	Best New Actress	Lee Se-young	Won
2016	30th KBS Drama Awards	Netizen Award	Lee Dong-gun	Nominated
2016	30th KBS Drama Awards	Best Couple	Cha In-pyo & Ra Mi-ran	Won
2016	30th KBS Drama Awards	Best Couple	Hyun Woo & Lee Se-young	Won
2017	53rd Baeksang Arts Awards	Best New Actress	Lee Se-young	Won
2017	10th Korea Drama Awards	Grand Prize (Daesang)	Cha In-pyo	Nominated
2017	10th Korea Drama Awards	Best New Actress	Lee Se-young	Nominated
