= Sweet 18 =

South Korean television series

- Promotional poster for Sweet 18
- Hangul: 낭랑18세
- Hanja: 娘朗18歲
- RR: Nangnang18se
- MR: Nangnang18se
- Written by: Kim Eun-hee; Yoon Eun-kyung
- Directed by: Kim Myung-wook; Kim Jung-gyu
- Starring: Han Ji-hye; Lee Dong-gun
- Country of origin: South Korea
- No. of episodes: 16

Production
- Running time: Mondays and Tuesdays at 21:55 (KST)

Original release
- Network: Korean Broadcasting System
- Release: January 19 – March 9, 2004

Sweet 18 (Korean: 낭랑18세; RR: Nangnang18se; lit. '18-year-old Bride') is a South Korean television series that aired on KBS2 in 2004. The story revolves around the relationship between Jung-sook, a member of Papyeong's Yun clan, and Hyuk-joon, a member of Andong's Kwon clan. Both clans hoped for re-establishing good relations after being separated for three generations by war, by arranging a marriage between Jung-sook and Hyuk-joon upon Jung-sook's birth.

== Plot ==
Yoon Jung-sook (Han Ji-hye) is an eighteen-year-old, lively school girl. One day, she encounters a mysterious man in traditional Korean clothing on the streets who carries Chu Shi Biao, a piece of literature her grandfather treasured. Despite not seeing his face, she falls head-over-heels in love with him and vows to marry him. Since she is the member of a noble but declined Korean Clan, the Yun clan, she will have to marry Kwon Hyuk-joon (Lee Dong-gun), the heir of the Kwon clan, according to the betrothal arranged by their clans. Hyuk-joon is ten years older than Jung-sook and already a prosecutor. Jung-sook finds out that Hyuk-joon is the mysterious man whom she fell in love with. She becomes a housewife while her friends continue to attend college. Two worlds clash, as Jung-sook is still an immature teenager and Hyuk-joon a grown man. However, slowly, the feelings become mutual, despite the fact that Jung-sook is pursued by a school mate and Hyuk-joon meets his first love again, who wants him back. Jung-sook has much to learn about the ancient traditions of her husband's family, especially because her husband is a first-born of his generation. In the end, Jung-sook gives birth to twins and starts a sewing business. Hyuk-joon continues his career as a prosecutor in Seoul.

== Cast ==
- Han Ji-hye as Yoon Jung-sook
- Lee Dong-gun as Kwon Hyuk-joon
- Lee Da-hae as Moon Ga-young
- Lee In (Note: Credited as Lee Joon.) as Ji Nam-cheol
- Yoo Hye-jung as Kwon Sun-ah
- Park Joon-hyuk as Jung Chan
- Lee Soon-jae as Hyuk-joon's grandfather
- Kim Hae-sook as Jung-sook's mother
- Jung Kyung-ho as Jung-sook's blind date
- Lee Eun-joo as Seo Hyun-ju (Second Princess)
- Lee Eun-shil as Eun-ju (Third Princess)
- Kim Sun-hwa as Madam Kim
- Jo Yeon-hee as Hyuk-jun's college junior
- Ko Kyu-pil as Hyuk-joon's co-worker
- Park Ji-il as Hyuk-joon's uncle
