= Han Ji-hye =

South Korean actress

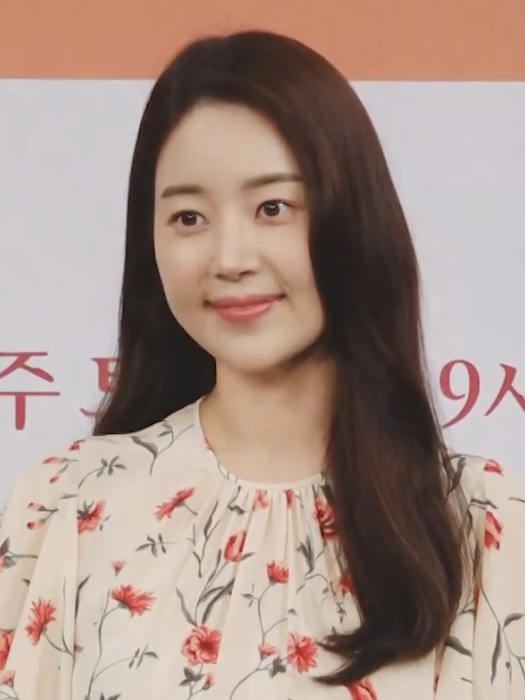
- Han in July 2019
- Born: Lee Ji-hye; June 29, 1984 (age 42); Gwangju, South Korea
- Education: Sejong University - Film Arts
- Occupation: Actress
- Years active: 2001–present
- Agent: Awesome ENT
- Spouse: Jung Hyuk-joon (m. 2010)
- Children: 1

Korean name
- Hangul: 이지혜
- Hanja: 李智慧
- RR: I Jihye
- MR: I Chihye

Stage name
- Hangul: 한지혜
- Hanja: 韓智慧
- RR: Han Jihye
- MR: Han Chihye

Han Ji-hye (born Lee Ji-hye on June 29, 1984) is a South Korean actress.

== Background ==
Born Lee Ji-hye, she used the stage name "Han Ji-hye" upon learning that her real name would cause confusion among fans since an older actress, Lena Lee, also has the same Korean name.

== Career ==
=== 2001–2007 ===
Han made her entertainment debut as a model, then started acting in supporting roles in TV dramas such as Summer Scent. She landed her first leading role in Sweet 18. The next couple of years saw Han starring in low-rating dramas, but her 2007 daily drama Likeable or Not became very popular, topping the ratings chart during its run and recording the highest rating for a daily drama since 2000. Han then displayed newfound maturity and great improvement in her acting in the 2008 epic drama East of Eden.

=== 2008–2011 ===
In 2008, Han along with Leon Jay Williams sang the Korean and Chinese versions of Olympic theme song "Friends." She was brought to the project via a proposal from the Chinese Olympic committee to sing "Friends" as the official swimming theme of the Beijing National Aquatics Centre at the Beijing Olympics. Less than a year later, she again recorded a digital single, an upbeat electro-pop song titled "Luv Luv".

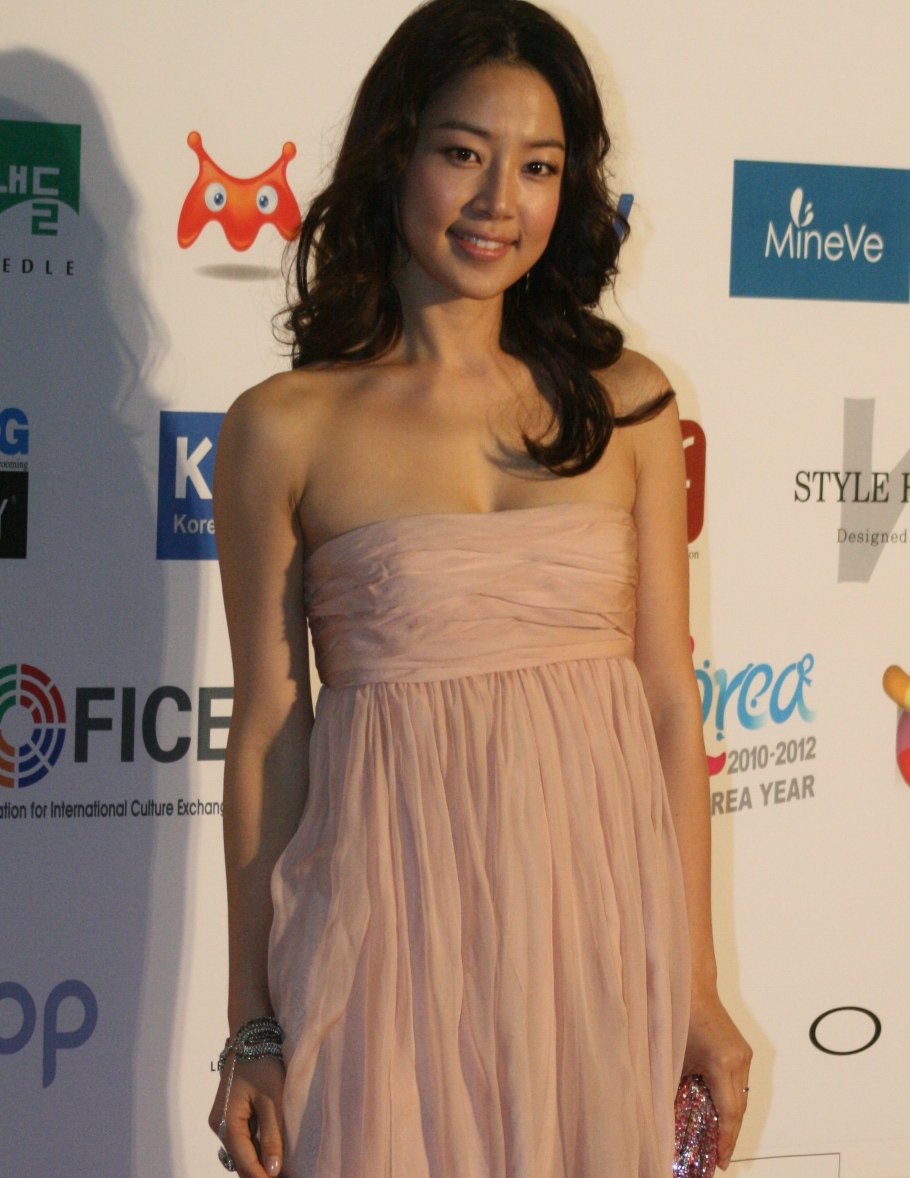
Han in 2009

After studying the craft of shoemaking and design in Florence, Italy, Han collaborated with existing shoe brand Jinny Kim to design and produce her own line, called "H by Jinny Kim." This was documented on Han Ji-hye: Shoes! My Dream! which aired on cable channel O'live TV. The Fall/Winter 2009 collection were sold in major department stores in Seoul and the surrounding metro areas, as well as in a well-known department store in Singapore and various online shopping malls.

Han then published My Fair Lady, a collection of autobiographical lifestyle essays. The volume focused on Han's hobbies and daily life rather than on her onscreen work and contained Han's writings about her experiences as a twentysomething single woman, as well as her reflections on her life. It also touched on the various projects she has undertaken such as designing shoes, studying tea ceremony, learning about ceramics, DIY furniture making, and fabric art.

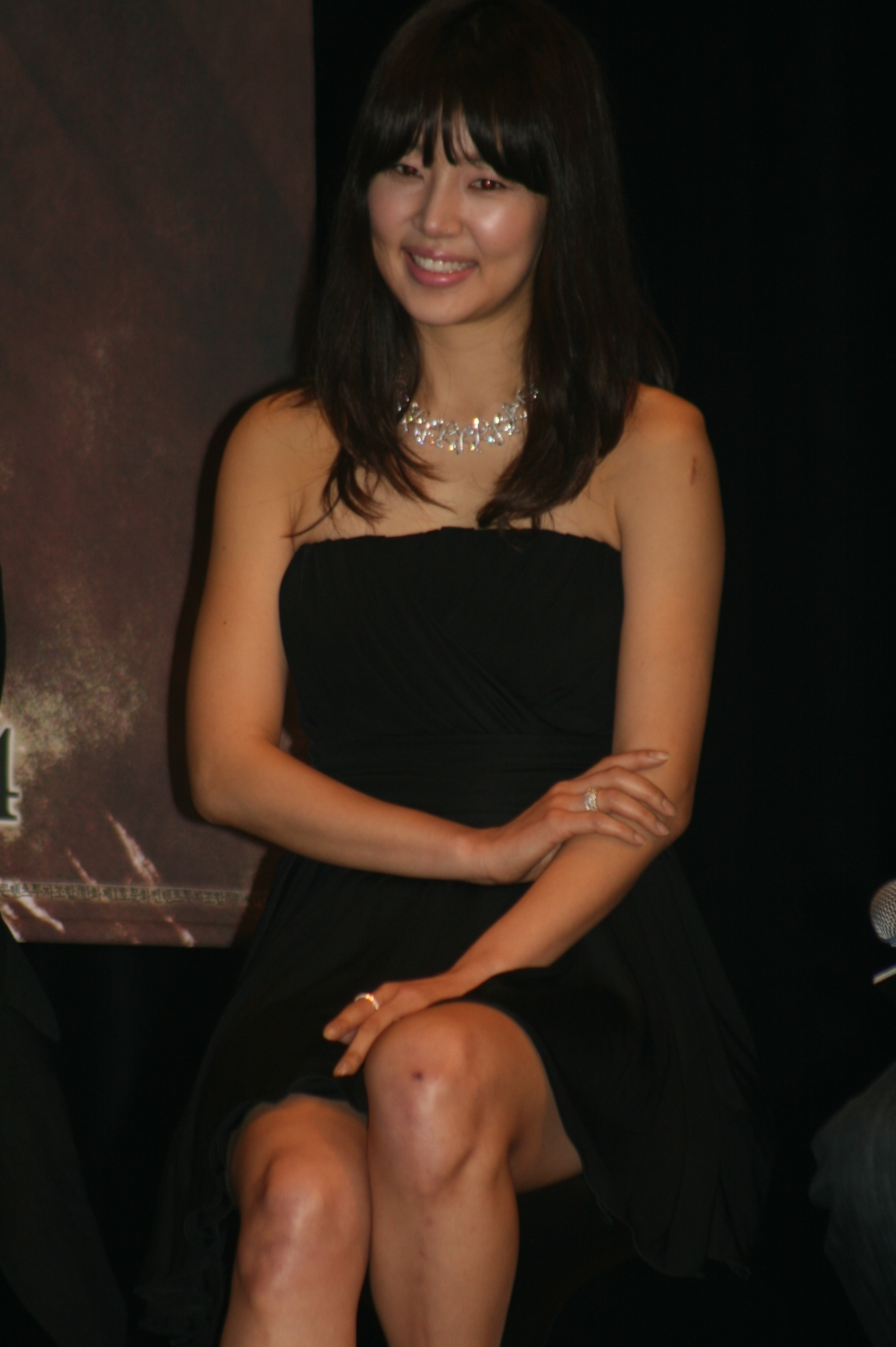
Han in 2010

Director Lee Joon-ik cast Han in his 2010 period action film Blades of Blood without auditioning her — not for her talents, but for her Asian-looking eyes. Aside from finding her single eyelid unique and difficult to find in recent years, Lee liked that she related to him in a natural manner. Han said that Lee scolded her a lot in the beginning of the shoot for not acting well, so she used the pain in her heart to portray her character such that she improved towards the middle of the filming and learned a lot from him. She also sang on the soundtrack, having played a gisaeng in the film.

After starring in her first period drama series in 2011's The Duo, she played a woman who helps a young man achieve his dreams in the single-episode drama Pianist, and a visually impaired teacher in the 2-part Chuseok special The Great Gift. She also starred in her first Chinese drama, Heavenly Embroidery.

=== 2012–present ===
Han played the protagonist in the 2012 drama May Queen, the success story of a woman in the shipbuilding industry during Korea's modernization. In 2013, she portrayed dual roles in Pots of Gold (also known as I Summon You, Gold! or Gold, Appear!), a family comedy that explores money, love and marriage. This was followed by leading roles as a cold-hearted heiress in The Full Sun, and as a wrongfully convicted prisoner turned baker in 4 Legendary Witches in 2014.

In January 2016, Han signed with management agency KeyEast. In 2018, she made a comeback in the family drama Shall We Live Together.

== Personal life ==
On September 21, 2010, Han married public prosecutor Jung Hyuk-joon in a private ceremony in Hawaii. On December 31, 2020, Han announced on social media that she is expecting her first child, due in the Summer of 2021. On June 23, 2021, Han's agency announced that had given birth to a daughter, Jung Yoon-seul. Both her husband and daughter appeared on public television for the first time via Stars' Top Recipe at Fun-Staurant.

== Filmography ==
=== Film ===
Year	Title	Role
2002	Saving My Hubby	Convenience store clerk
2003	Singles	Ji-hye, Jeong-joon's new girlfriend
2005	My Boyfriend Is Type B	Ha-mi
2008	Humming	Mi-yeon
2010	Blades of Blood	Baek-ji

=== Television series ===
Year	Title	Role
2002	Great Luck Family	
2003	The Bean Chaff of My Life	Shin Hee-jung
2003	Scent of a Man	Ha Soo-min
2003	Summer Scent	Park Jung-ah
2003	Open Drama Man and Woman: "One More Step Than Love"	
2004	Sweet 18	Yoon Jung-sook
2004	Island Village Teacher	Hong Eun-soo
2004	Banjun Drama	
2005	The Secret Lovers	Seo Young-ji
2006	Cloud Stairs	Yoon Jung-won
2007	Likeable or Not	Na Dan-poong
2008	East of Eden	Kim Ji-hyun
2010	KBS Drama Special: "Pianist"	Yoon In-sa
2011	The Duo	Dong-nyeo
2011	Heavenly Embroidery	Quan Cai Xi
2011	The Great Gift	Kim Ha-yeon
2012	May Queen	Chun Hae-joo
2013	Pots of Gold	Jung Mong-hee / Son Yoo-na
2014	Beyond the Clouds	Han Young-won
2014	4 Legendary Witches	Moon Soo-in
2018	Marry Me Now	Park Yoo-ha
2019	The Golden Garden	Eun Dong-joo
2023	Han River Police	Eun-sook (special appearance)

=== Music video appearances ===
Year	Song title	Artist
2002	"그댄 행복에 살텐데"	Leeds
2003	"잊을 수 있을까요?"	Leeds
2004	[Part 1] "Whistle to Me (Hwilili)"	Lee Soo-young
2004	[Part 2] "Andante"	Lee Soo-young
2005	"Forever You"	Lee Soo-young
2005	"Gwanghwamun Love Song"	Lee Soo-young

== Discography ==
=== Singles ===
Year	Song title	Notes
2008	"Love You Forever"	duet with Lee Chun-hee; 2 tracks from Humming OST
2008	"Friends"	Beijing Olympics swimming theme song
2009	"Luv Luv"	digital single feat. Soul Tronik
2010	"Sangsamong"	track from Blades of Blood OST

== Bibliography ==
Year	Title	ISBN
2010	My Fair Lady	ISBN 978-89-963339-4-4

== Shoe line ==
Year	Brand	Ref.
2009	H by Jinny Kim	

== Awards and nominations ==
Year	Award	Category	Nominated work	Result
2001	Supermodel Contest	Dodo Makeup Award	—N/a	Won
2003	KBS Drama Awards	Best New Actress	Summer Scent	Won
2004	40th Baeksang Arts Awards	Best New Actress (TV)	Sweet 18	Won
2004	MBC Entertainment Awards	Best Female Newcomer in a Variety Show		Won
2004	KBS Drama Awards	Excellence Award, Actress	Sweet 18	Nominated
2005	42nd Grand Bell Awards	Best New Actress	My Boyfriend Is Type B	Nominated
2005	26th Blue Dragon Film Awards	Best New Actress	My Boyfriend Is Type B	Nominated
2005	MBC Drama Awards	Excellence Award, Actress	The Secret Lovers	Nominated
2005	MBC Drama Awards	Popularity Award, Actress	The Secret Lovers	Nominated
2006	Korea Best Dresser Swan Awards	Best Dressed, TV Actress category	—N/a	Won
2007	KBS Drama Awards	Excellence Award, Actress in a Daily Drama	Likeable or Not	Won
2008	2nd Korea Drama Awards	Excellence Award, Actress	Likeable or Not	Won
2008	MBC Drama Awards	Excellence Award, Actress	East of Eden	Won
2009	4th Asia Model Awards	Model Star Award	—N/a	Won
2009	Korea Cadastral Survey Corporation	Plaque of Appreciation	—N/a	Won
2009	45th Baeksang Arts Awards	Best Actress (TV)	East of Eden	Nominated
2010	Korea International Jewelry & Watch Fair	Best Jewelry Lady	—N/a	Won
2010	KBS Drama Awards	Best Actress in a One-Act/Special/Short Drama	Pianist	Nominated
2012	20th Korean Culture and Entertainment Awards	Top Excellence Award, Actress in a Drama	May Queen	Won
2012	MBC Drama Awards	Top Excellence Award, Actress in a Serial Drama	May Queen	Won
2012	MBC Drama Awards	Best Couple Award with Kim Jae-won	May Queen	Nominated
2012	MBC Drama Awards	Popularity Award, Actress	May Queen	Nominated
2013	2nd APAN Star Awards	Excellence Award, Actress	Pots of Gold	Nominated
2013	MBC Drama Awards	Top Excellence Award, Actress in a Serial Drama	Pots of Gold	Won
2013	MBC Drama Awards	Best Couple Award with Yeon Jung-hoon	Pots of Gold	Nominated
2013	MBC Drama Awards	Popularity Award, Actress	Pots of Gold	Nominated
2014	KBS Drama Awards	Best Couple Award with Yoon Kye-sang	The Full Sun	Nominated
2014	KBS Drama Awards	Netizen Award, Actress	The Full Sun	Nominated
2014	MBC Drama Awards	Top Excellence Award, Actress in a Special Project Drama	4 Legendary Witches	Nominated
2014	MBC Drama Awards	Best Couple Award with Ha Seok-jin	4 Legendary Witches	Nominated
2014	MBC Drama Awards	Popularity Award, Actress	4 Legendary Witches	Nominated
2015	4th APAN Star Awards	Top Excellence Award, Actress in a Serial Drama	4 Legendary Witches	Nominated
2018	11th Korea Drama Awards	Top Excellence Award, Actress	Marry Me Now	Nominated
2018	6th APAN Star Awards	Top Excellence Award, Actress in a Serial Drama	Marry Me Now	Nominated
2018	KBS Drama Awards	Excellence Award, Actress in a Serial Drama	Marry Me Now	Won
2018	KBS Drama Awards	Best Couple Award with Lee Sang-woo	Marry Me Now	Nominated
2018	KBS Drama Awards	Netizen Award, Actress	Marry Me Now	Nominated
2019	MBC Drama Awards	Top Excellence, Actress in a Weekend/Daily Drama	The Golden Garden	Nominated
