= Blades of Blood =

- Theatrical poster
- Hangul: 구름을 벗어난 달처럼
- Lit.: Like the Moon Escaping from the Clouds
- RR: Gureumeul beoseonan dalcheoreom
- MR: Kurŭmŭl pŏsŏnan talch'ŏrŏm
- Directed by: Lee Joon-ik
- Written by: Jo Cheol-hyeon; Oh Seung-hyeon; Choi Seok-hwan
- Based on: Like the Moon Escaping from the Clouds by Park Heung-yong
- Produced by: Jo Cheol-hyeon; Lee Jeong-se
- Starring: Hwang Jung-min; Cha Seung-won; Baek Sung-hyun; Han Ji-hye
- Cinematography: Chung Chung-hoon
- Edited by: Kim Sang-bum; Kim Jae-bum
- Music by: Kim Soo-chul; Kim Jun-seok
- Production companies: Studio Acheem; Tiger Pictures
- Distributed by: SK Telecom
- Release date: April 28, 2010
- Running time: 107 minutes
- Country: South Korea
- Language: Korean
- Box office: US$8.2 million

Blades of Blood (Korean: 구름을 벗어난 달처럼) is a 2010 South Korean period action drama film directed by Lee Joon-ik. The film is based on Park Heung-yong's graphic novel Like the Moon Escaping from the Clouds.

== Plot ==
In the late 16th century, the kingdom of Joseon is thrown into chaos by the threat of a Japanese invasion. Lee Mong-hak (Cha Seung-won), an illegitimate offspring from a cadet family of the ruling dynasty, and legendary blind swordsman Hwang Jeong-hak (Hwang Jung-min) were once allies who dreamed of stamping out the Japanese invasion, social inequality and corruption, and creating a better world. Persecuted by the court, Lee forms a rebel army in hopes of overthrowing the inept king and taking the throne himself. Lee is willing to kill recklessly and betray former comrades to forge his bloody path to the palace. Gyeon-ja is the bastard child of a family killed by Mong-hak. Hwang Jeong-hak saves him from an injury caused by Mong-hak. Together the two search for Mong-hak in order to confront and kill him.

After Mong-hak's Great Alliance rebel army defeat a large government military force, Hwang Jeong-hak confronts him alone. After a lengthy battle, Mong-hak's skill proves too much and the blind swordsman falls. Gyeon-ja, finding Jeong-hak dead, decides to head to Seoul, the capital of Joseon and final destination of Mong-hak. While, Mong-hak, despite finding out that Japanese forces are approaching and will slaughter and pillage every villagers and settlements they encounter, orders the Great Alliance army to press on towards to Seoul, abandoning the commoners who gathered to rebel camp seeking protection from invading forces. The rebels take Seoul, but are confused and frustrated as the king has already abandoned the capital and the palace lies forlorn. Gyeon-ja, who has arrived at the palace before the rebels came, confronts Mong-hak as he approaches the throne pavilion. A few moments later the Japanese army arrives and begins massacring the rebel army with their arquebuses. Gyeon-ja succeeds in killing Mong-hak then dies at the hands of the Japanese army.

== Cast ==
- Hwang Jung-min as Hwang Jeong-hak
- Cha Seung-won as Lee Mong-hak
- Baek Sung-hyun as Gyeon-ja
- Han Ji-hye as Baek-ji
- Lee Dol-hyeong as nobleman Song
- Kim Chang-wan as King Seonjo
- Song Young-chang as Han Sin-gyun
- Yeom Dong-hyun as nobleman Park
- Jeong Gyu-su as tableware maker
- Shin Jung-geun as nobleman Yu
- Ryu Seung-ryong as nobleman Jeong
- Lee Hae-young as Han Pil-ju
- Yang Young-jo as Lee Jang-gak
- Jeong Min-seong as Hwang Yun-gil
- Lee Jae-gu as Magistrate Choi
- Jeong Jae-heon as executor
- Kang Hyun-jung as Daedong mob subordinate
- Han Seung-do as police chief
- Ji Il-ju as scholar
- Lee Sol-gu as prison guard
- Jo Gyeong-hun as assassin
- Choi Dae-sung as Im Chul-min's subordinate
- Park Jin-wu as Kim Sung-il
- Yeon Young-geol as public officer
- Kim Byung-oh as low public officer 4
- Shin Yeong-sik as nobleman
- Kim Young-hoon as executor
- Kim Sang-ho as Park Dol-seok
- Kim Bo-yeon as gisaeng's mother
- Min-yeong as gisaeng
- Kim Seong-hun as executioner

== Production ==
Actor Hwang Jung-min expressed his difficulty playing a blind character in the film. Hwang went to schools for blind people to observe their movements but stated that "it still wasn't an easy role to play".

== Release ==
Blades of Blood premiered on April 29, 2010, in South Korea. It opened at number two in the box office, grossing US$2,675,391 on 603 screens. In total the film received 1,389,295 admissions nationwide with a domestic gross of US$8,217,720.

The film had its international premiere at New York Asian Film Festival on July 8, 2010, where it was the festival's closing film. Lee Joon-ik won the Jury Award for Best Director at the Fantasia Festival in Montreal Canada. Blades of Blood was one of six films considered as Korea's submission for the foreign-language Oscar award.

== Reception ==
Film Business Asia gave the film a rating of seven out of ten, praising action and characters calling it a "cut above most Korean swordplay dramas." Variety gave the film a mixed review, stating that "political infighting on the eve of a Japanese invasion is told with unnecessarily broad, imagistic strokes that let character-generated conflicts slip between the blades" as well as that "the film easily outdoes numerous gimmicky f/x extravaganzas, explaining its early pickup by several European and Asian distribs."
