= Jo Yoon-hee =

South Korean actress (born 1982)

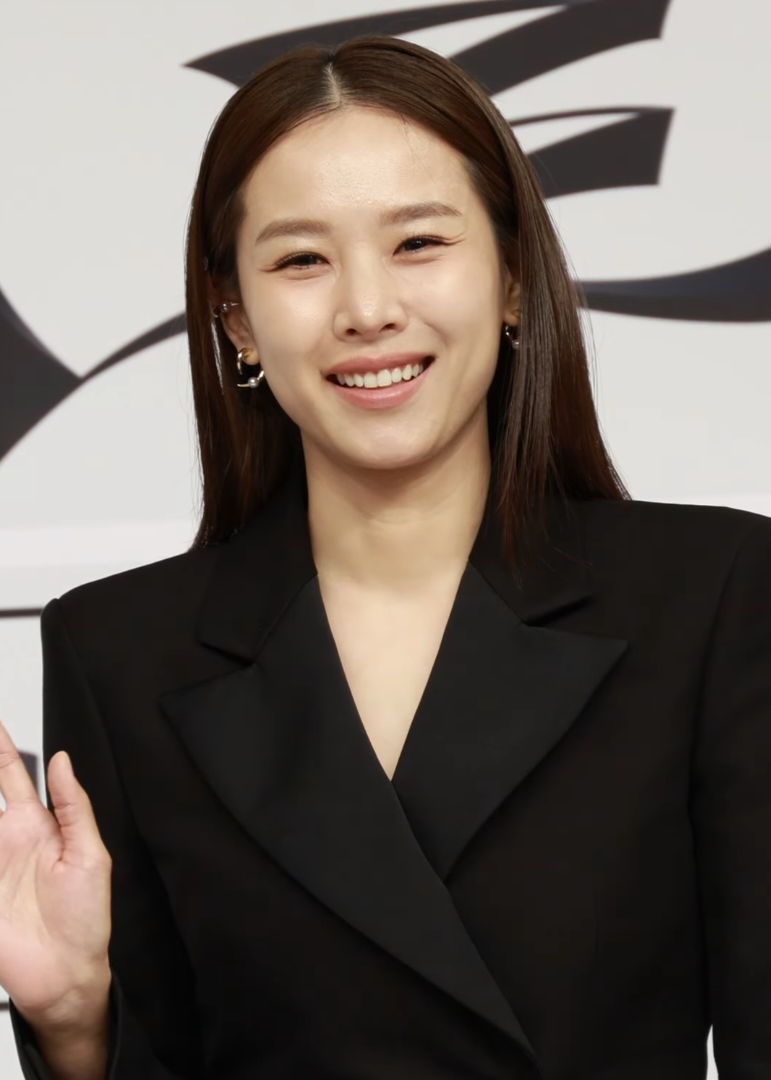
- Jo in March 2024
- Born: October 13, 1982 (age 44); Cheongju, South Korea
- Other name: Cho Yoon-hee
- Education: Dongduk Women's University (Department of Broadcasting and Entertainment)
- Occupations: Actress; model
- Years active: 1999–present
- Agent: King Kong by Starship
- Spouse: Lee Dong-gun (m. 2017; div. 2020)
- Children: 1

Korean name
- Hangul: 조윤희
- Hanja: 趙胤熙
- RR: Jo Yunhui
- MR: Cho Yunhŭi
- Website: starship-ent.com/actor/choyoonhee

Jo Yoon-hee (Korean: 조윤희; born October 13, 1982) is a South Korean actress. She is best known for starring in the television dramas My Husband Got a Family (2012), Nine (2013), The Gentlemen of Wolgyesu Tailor Shop (2016), and Beautiful Love, Wonderful Life (2019).

== Early life and education ==
Jo Yoon-hee was born on October 13, 1982 in Cheongju, North Chungcheong Province, but moved to Seoul when she was 5 years old, where she continues to reside. She has one sister who is a year older than her. She attended Sunae High School and it was as a second year student that she was scouted by an agency manager. She graduated from Dongduk Women's University with a bachelor's degree from the Department of Broadcasting and Entertainment.

== Career ==
=== 1999–2007: Beginnings ===
Jo was cast by an agency manager when she was in high school while at a department store. She initially worked as a fashion magazine model before making her official debut in the entertainment industry in 1999, appearing in the music video for ballad singer Lee Soo-young's debut song "I Believe". She played the role of a pitiful high school student with a hearing impairment. Her mother also appeared alongside her in the music video after coming along and being cast on set. Jo received positive reception for her appearance in the music video and would go on to be cast in about 10 CFs. Being under the same agency, she would continue to make numerous appearances in Lee Soo-young's music videos. They would end up working together in a total of nine music videos.

In 2002, she made her television debut in the SBS sitcom Orange. She would continue to play supporting roles in numerous television series, such as Love Letter in 2003 and Snow White in 2004. She made her film debut in 2003 as Lee Jae-rim in The Last Supper. In 2004, she starred in the film Taegukgi.

In early May 2005, Jo signed a 3-year exclusive contract with SidusHQ.

=== 2008–2019: Main roles and success in weekend dramas ===
In 2008, Jo starred in her first lead role in the low-budget film Living Together, Happy Together. That same year, she secured her first main television role in the MBC drama Spotlight as political reporter Yang Myung-eun, rival to the female protagonist played by Son Ye-jin.

In 2009, she starred in the KBS2 drama Hot Blood as Min Da-hae alongside Park Hae-jin. Her performance was well-received and helped her gain recognition amongst the public.

In 2010, she starred in the MBC daily drama Golden Fish as Han Ji-min. The show performed well, maintaining its position as the top daily drama with viewership ratings exceeding 20%. Jo won Best New Actress for her performance at the 2010 MBC Drama Awards. The year after, in 2011, she starred in the SBS romantic-comedy series Lie to Me.

In 2012, she starred in the KBS2 weekend drama My Husband Got a Family. The drama was successful, maintaining the top spot in viewership ratings throughout its run with ratings that exceeded 40%. Her performance won her Best Supporting Actress and Best Couple with Lee Hee-joon at the 2012 KBS Drama Awards. That same year, she made her return to the big screen after five years in the crime thriller film The Traffickers.

In 2013, Jo starred in the time-travelling romance drama Nine as Joo Min-young alongside Lee Jin-wook. She won the Female Top Excellence Award at the 6th Korea Drama Awards for her performance. In May 2013, it was announced that Jo was cast as the female lead in MBC's upcoming weekend drama The Scandal. She was nominated for the Female Excellence Award in a Special Project Drama, Female Popularity Award, and Best Couple Award with Kim Jae-won at the year-end MBC Drama Awards for her performance.

In February 2014, Jo's exclusive contract with Fantagio expired and she decided not to renew. In March 2014, it was announced that Jo signed an exclusive contract with King Kong Entertainment. That same year, Jo starred in her first historical drama as Kim Ga-hee in The King's Face alongside Seo In-guk and Lee Sung-jae. She was also cast as the female lead in the action crime film The Con Artists. The film was released on December 24, 2014. It was a box office hit and surpassed 1 million moviegoers within four days of its release.

In 2015, she made a special appearance in four episodes of The Producers playing the role of Kim Soo-hyun's first love. She also starred in the period romance film The Magician as the blind kisaeng Bo-eum. The film was released on December 30, 2015. In December 2015, it was announced that Jo would star in tvN's upcoming crime drama Pied Piper as Inspector Yeo Myung-ha alongside Shin Ha-kyun and Yoo Jun-sang. The show premiered on March 7, 2016. She also ventured into variety show appearances as an MC for the first time through OnStyle's The Bodyguard, co-hosting with actor Lee Dong-wook. The show's first broadcast aired on April 28, 2016. Further venturing into different avenues, Jo took on the role of radio DJ for KBS Cool FM's Volume Up. She served as DJ host from May 9, 2016 to June 2, 2017.

Later that year, she starred in KBS2's weekend drama The Gentlemen of Wolgyesu Tailor Shop as the female lead alongside Lee Dong-gun. The first episode aired on August 27, 2016. The show remained first in weekend drama viewership rankings throughout the entirety of its broadcast, with ratings surpassing 30%. She won the Female Excellence in a Serial Drama Award at the 2016 KBS Drama Awards for her role. She also appeared on the big screen in the action comedy film Luck Key as paramedic Kang Ri-na alongside Yoo Hae-jin. The film ranked first at the box office for two weeks in a row and surpassed 4 million cumulative viewers.

In November 2018, it was announced that Jo would be joining the fourth season of Happy Together as the new main host alongside Yoo Jae-suk, Jun Hyun-moo and Jo Se-ho. She recorded her first episode on December 8, 2018. Her first episode aired on December 13, 2018 with a 'Please Take Care of Yoon-hee' special. On July 16, 2019, Jo made her comeback to the small screen after two years in the KBS2 weekend drama Beautiful Love, Wonderful Life. The show premiered on September 28, 2019. On September 25, 2019, Jo's agency confirmed that she would be stepping down from Happy Together to focus on filming for her drama. Her last recording for the show was on September 28 and aired on October 17, 2019.

=== 2020−present: Regular variety show appearances and return to acting ===
In 2020, Jo participated in the SBS program The Dog I Encountered as a regular cast member. The premise of the show involved rescuing animals and the first episode was broadcast on December 17, 2020.

In 2021, Jo appeared in the program Brave Solo Parenting: I Raise as a regular cast member. Through the show, she revealed her daughter to the public for the first time. The program followed Jo's daily life raising her daughter as a single mother following her divorce from actor Lee Dong-gun. The show's first episode aired on July 9, 2021.

After taking a brief hiatus from acting, in September 2022, it was confirmed that Jo would return to acting in the upcoming SBS drama The Escape of the Seven as Go Myeong-ji. On February 24, 2023, SBS confirmed that The Escape of the Seven was preparing for a second season ahead of its premiere and that Jo would be participating in the second season. The first episode of season 1 premiered on September 15, 2023 and season 2 premiered the following year on March 29, 2024. Later that year, Jo made her return to the big screen after 8 years in the film Spring Garden, which also marked as her first role in a horror film. The film was released on August 21, 2024. It performed moderately well for a horror film at the box office, surpassing 200,000 moviegoers in just five days within its release. She is also participating in TV Chosun's new program I Am Alone Now as a regular cast member. The show explores her single life as a divorcee and the process of adapting to this new stage of life. It was first broadcast on July 9, 2024.

== Personal life ==
=== Marriage ===
On February 28, 2017, it was confirmed that Jo and her The Gentlemen of Wolgyesu Tailor Shop co-star Lee Dong-gun were dating. Their agencies stated that the two had developed romantic feelings and began dating towards the end of their drama.

On May 2, 2017, Jo announced that she and Lee had registered their marriage and that they were expecting their first child. The couple held a private wedding ceremony on September 29, 2017. They welcomed a baby girl, Lee Ro-a, on December 14, 2017.

On May 28, 2020, it was reported that the two actors had filed for divorce due to irreconcilable differences. Jo received custody of their daughter.

== Filmography ==
=== Film ===
Year	Title	Role	Notes	Ref.
2003	The Last Supper	Lee Jae-rim		
2004	Taegukgi	Lee Jin-seok's granddaughter		
2008	Living Together, Happy Together	Noh Yoo-jin		
2009	4th Period Mystery	Hong Joo-hee	Cameo	
2012	Doomsday Book	Ji-eun		
2012	The Traffickers	Yoo-ri		
2014	The Con Artists	Eun-ha		
2015	Joseon Magician	Bo-eum		
2016	Luck Key	Kang Ri-na		
2024	Spring Garden	So-hee		

=== Television series ===
Year	Title	Role	Notes	Ref.
2002	Orange	Jo Yoon-hee		
2003	Love Letter	Jung Yu-ri		
2004	MBC Best Theater: "Butterfly"	Ji-won		
2004	Snow White: Taste Sweet Love	Tsukihara Minako		
2006	Love Can't Wait	Kang Hee-soo		
2007	Drama City: "God"	Hong Seo-yeon		
2008	Drama City: "LoveForSale.com"	Ji Yeon-woo		
2008	Spotlight	Chae Myung-eun		
2009	Hometown Legends: "The Grudge Island"	Mi-hyang		
2009	Hot Blood	Min Da-hae		
2009	Smile, You	Kang Hyun-soo's blind date	Cameo	
2010	Golden Fish	Han Ji-min		
2011	Lie To Me	Oh Yoon-joo		
2012	My Husband Got a Family	Bang Yi-sook		
2013	Love in Memory			
2013	Nine	Joo Min-young		
2013	The Scandal	Woo Ah-mi		
2014–2015	The King's Face	Kim Ga-hee		
2015	The Producers	Shin Hae-joo	Cameo (Episode 1–4)	
2016	Pied Piper	Yeo Myung-ha		
2016–2017	The Gentlemen of Wolgyesu Tailor Shop	Na Yeon-sil		
2019–2020	Beautiful Love, Wonderful Life	Kim Seol-ah		
2023–2024	The Escape of the Seven	Go Myeong-ji		
2025	Second Shot at Love	Han Hyun-joo		

=== Television shows ===
Year	Title	Notes	Ref.
2002	Music Plus		
2002	Soulmates		
2003	The War of Roses		
2011	I'm Real: Jo Yoon-hee	Presenter	
2013	Koica's Dream 2012	Regular cast	
2013	Jo Yoon-hee: Dressed Up in Beverly Hills	Presenter	
2016	My Bodyguard	Presenter	
2018	Happy Together	Season 4 (Episode 10–53)	
2020	The Dog I Encountered	Regular cast	
2021	Honki Club	Cast member	
2021	Brave Solo Parenting: I Raise	Regular cast	
2024	I Am Alone Now	Regular member	

=== Music video appearances ===
Year	Title	Artist	Ref.
1999	"I Believe"	Lee Soo-young	
2000	"For You...."	Lee Ji-hoon	
2001	"Doll"	Lee Ji-hoon feat. Shin Hye-sung	
2001	"Charari"	Lee Soo-young	
2001	"Bus Stop"	Lee Soo-young	
2001	"Fantasy"	Lee Soo-young	
2001	"Cafe"	Lee Soo-young	
2002	"La La La"	Lee Soo-young	
2002	"Debt"	Lee Soo-young	
2003	"Goodbye"	Lee Soo-young	
2003	"Left Alone"	Lee Soo-young	
2003	"I Still Bite My Lips"	Lee Soo-young	
2003	"Have Yourself A Merry Little Christmas"	Lee Seung-chul	
2004	"Gwanghwamun Love Song"	Lee Soo-young	
2006	"Confession"	4Men	
2013	"Goodbye in Once Upon a Time"	Eric Nam	

=== Radio shows ===
Year	Title	Role	Notes	Ref.
2016–2017	Jo Yoon-hee's Volume Up	DJ	May 9, 2016 – June 2, 2017	

== Awards and nominations ==
Name of the award ceremony, year presented, category, nominee of the award, and the result of the nomination
Award ceremony	Year	Category	Nominee / Work	Result	Ref.
KBS Drama Awards	2009	Best New Actress	Hot Blood	Nominated	
KBS Drama Awards	2012	Best Couple Award	Jo Yoon-hee (with Lee Hee-joon); My Husband Got a Family	Won	
KBS Drama Awards	2012	Best Supporting Actress	My Husband Got a Family	Won	
KBS Drama Awards	2012	Netizen Award, Actress	My Husband Got a Family	Nominated	
KBS Drama Awards	2014	Best Couple Award	Jo Yoon-hee (with Seo In-guk); The King's Face	Nominated	
KBS Drama Awards	2014	Excellence Award, Actress in a Mid-length Drama	The King's Face	Nominated	
KBS Drama Awards	2014	Netizen Award, Actress	The King's Face	Nominated	
KBS Drama Awards	2016	Excellence Award, Actress in a Serial Drama	The Gentlemen of Wolgyesu Tailor Shop	Won	
KBS Drama Awards	2016	Top Excellence Award, Actress	The Gentlemen of Wolgyesu Tailor Shop	Nominated	
KBS Drama Awards	2019	Best Couple Award	Jo Yoon-hee (with Yoon Park); Beautiful Love, Wonderful Life	Nominated	
KBS Drama Awards	2019	Excellence Award, Actress in a Serial Drama	Beautiful Love, Wonderful Life	Nominated	
KBS Drama Awards	2019	Netizen Award, Actress	Beautiful Love, Wonderful Life	Nominated	
Korea Drama Awards	2013	Top Excellence Award, Actress	Nine	Won	
Korea Drama Awards	2013	Best Couple Award	Jo Yoon-hee (with Lee Jin-wook); Nine	Nominated	
MBC Drama Awards	2010	Best New Actress	Golden Fish	Won	
MBC Drama Awards	2013	Best Couple Award	Jo Yoon-hee (with Kim Jae-won); The Scandal	Nominated	
MBC Drama Awards	2013	Excellence Award, Actress in a Special Project Drama	The Scandal	Nominated	
MBC Drama Awards	2013	Popularity Award, Actress	The Scandal	Nominated	
SBS Drama Awards	2023	Excellence Award, Actress in a Miniseries Genre/Action Drama	The Escape of the Seven	Nominated	
Style Icon Awards	2012	New Icon	Jo Yoon-hee	Won	
