= Hot Blood (TV series) =

- Promotional poster
- Also known as: Passionate Entrepreneur; Hot-Blooded Salesman
- Genre: Drama
- Created by: Baek Hye-joo
- Based on: Manhwa "Hot Blood" by Park In-kwon
- Screenplay by: Hong Seung-hyun; Yoo Byung-woo; Kim Kyung-hoi
- Directed by: Ji Byung-hyun
- Creative directors: Lee Na-jeong; Lee Suk-young
- Starring: Park Hae-jin; Chae Jung-an; Choi Cheol-ho; Jo Yoon-hee
- Opening theme: "Challenger" by Jay Park
- Country of origin: South Korea
- Original language: Korean
- No. of seasons: 1
- No. of episodes: 20

Production
- Executive producer: Kim Hyung-il
- Producers: Song Hyun-wook; Yoon Ha-rim
- Running time: 65 min
- Production company: Hwa&Dam Pictures

Original release
- Network: KBS2
- Release: 10 October – 23 December 2009

Hot Blood (Korean: 열혈 장사꾼; RR: Yeolhyeol jangsakkun) is a 2009 South Korean drama based on the Manhwa with the same title by Park In-kwon starring Park Hae-jin, Chae Jung-an, Choi Cheol-ho and Jo Yoon-hee. It aired on Saturdays at 10:15 pm, and Sundays at 10:25 pm for 20 episodes.

This series depicts the hard-working, life, and love of a car salesman.

The average viewership rating for the series was 9.1%, and the highest viewership rating was recorded on October 18 at 12.5%.

== Plot ==
Revolves around penniless Ha-ryu who is driven by upward mobility and a thirst for personal success. Here is a man who can do whatever it takes to make money. He dreams of raking in 10 billion won by selling cars. Due to this wild idea, he is deemed crazy by everyone, but is ready to sell even his soul to become a billionaire. "I will make myself fully prepared to take every chance that lies ahead of me!!!" --KBS World

== Cast ==
=== Main ===
- Park Hae-jin as Ha-Ryoo
- Chae Jung-an as Kim Jae-hee
- Choi Cheol-ho as Kang Seung-joo
- Jo Yoon-hee as Min Da-hae

=== Supporting ===
- Lee Won-jong as Mae Wang (Choi Go-dong), a car dealer
- Lee Sung-min as Yang Man-chul, a salesman
- Jung Dong-hwan as President Song, the Taepoong Car company's president
- Jang Tae-sung as Yong-Goo, the former car thief
- Kim Gun as a car salesman

=== People around Ha-Ryoo ===
- Cho Jin-woong as Lee Soon-kil, a car salesman
- Jung Young-sook as Ha-Ryoo's mother
- Choi Jong-won as Ha-Ryoo's father
- Cha Soo-yeon as Se-Yeon, Ha-Ryoo's ex-lover

=== People around Seung-joo ===
- Song Jae-ho as President Yoo, Daesang group's president
- Kim Kyu-chul as Director Yoon, President Yoo's right-hand man
- Lee Jae-yong as Song Man-deuk
- Kang Jae-sub as Kim Duk-bae, Kang Seung-joo's secretary and driver

=== People around Da-hae ===
- Han Ye-won as Hong Ji-oh, Da-hae's roommate and best friend
- Jung Sung-ho as Da-hae's father

=== Others ===
- Yang Taek-jo as Heo Jung-jae
- Oh Yong as Chang-shik, a senior car salesman
- Lee Dong-kyoo as Kim-bin
- Lee Seol-ah as Mi-jung, a car saleswoman
- Kim Sung-hoon as a night sales manager
- Kang Soo-han as Kim Gi-young
- Yun Je-wook
- Choi Yoon-young
- Kim Ki-hyun
- Goo Jung-rim
- – as Ran Yi
- Kwak In-joon
- Heo Jae-ho
- Baek Min

== Rating ==
Episode #	Original broadcast date	Average audience share
1	October 10, 2009	9.5%
2	October 11, 2009	10.1%
3	October 17, 2009	7.9%
4	October 18, 2009	12.5%
5	October 24, 2009	9.4%
6	October 25, 2009	10.5%
7	October 31, 2009	8.2%
8	November 1, 2009	10.1%
9	November 7, 2009	8.2%
10	November 8, 2009	11.3%
11	November 14, 2009	7.3%
12	November 15, 2009	10.8%
13	November 21, 2009	7.5%
14	November 22, 2009	9.3%
15	November 28, 2009	6.8%
16	November 29, 2009	9.4%
17	December 5, 2009	8.2%
18	December 6, 2009	9.3%
19	December 12, 2009	7.4%
20	December 13, 2009	9.0%
