= Stained Glass (TV series) =

South Korean television series

- Promotional poster
- Also known as: Stained Glass Window; Glass Picture; Glass Painting; Glass Flower
- Hangul: 유리화
- Hanja: 琉璃畵
- RR: Yurihwa
- MR: Yurihwa
- Genre: Romance; Melodrama
- Written by: Park Hye-kyung
- Directed by: Lee Chang-soon
- Starring: Lee Dong-gun; Kim Ha-neul; Kim Sung-soo
- Opening theme: Yurihwa
- Country of origin: South Korea
- Original languages: Korean; Japanese
- No. of episodes: 18

Production
- Producer: Goo Bon-geun
- Production locations: Korea; Japan
- Cinematography: Yoon Dae-young
- Running time: 60 minutes on Wednesdays and Thursdays at 21:55 (KST)
- Production company: Victory Contents

Original release
- Network: Seoul Broadcasting System
- Release: 1 December 2004 – 3 February 2005

Stained Glass (Korean: 유리화; RR: Yurihwa; lit. 'Glass Picture') is a 2004 South Korean television drama series starring Lee Dong-gun, Kim Ha-neul, and Kim Sung-soo. It aired on SBS from December 1, 2004 to February 3, 2005 on Wednesdays and Thursdays at 21:55 for 18 episodes.

The title refers to the stained glass artwork found in Roman Catholic Churches.

== Cast ==
- Lee Dong-gun as Han Dong-joo/Yuichi Yamamoto
  - Lee Pung-woon as young Dong-joo
- Kim Ha-neul as Shin Ji-soo
  - Park Eun-bin as young Ji-soo
- Kim Sung-soo as Park Gi-tae
  - Kim Hak-joon as young Gi-tae
- Jo Yi-jin as Park Tae-hee/Mako
- Shim Ji-ho as Shin Ji-suk
  - Jung Hyung-min as young Ji-suk
- Kim Se-ah as Chae Yoon-suh
- Ahn Hye-ran as Shim Joo-kyung
- Yuko Fueki as Jang Soo-yeon
- Roh Joo-hyun as President Park Jin-sung (of Dae Young Car Holdings)
- Lee Eung-kyung as Cha Jin-joo
- Han In-soo as Shin Jae-man/Yukio Yamamoto
- Fukumi Kuroda as Keiko Yamamoto
- Noboru Kaneko as Tani Masato
- Erinashi Kaori as Minori

== Synopsis ==
Dong-joo and Gi-tae were both abandoned by their parents as children. They grew up together in an orphanage and became best friends. After a family tragedy, Ji-soo was transferred to the same orphanage. Both boys fell for Ji-soo. One day while in the church, the three of them made a vow: Dong-joo and Gi-tae made a promise to take care of and protect Ji-soo in the absence of the other. While trying to retrieve the ocarina from the river, Dong-joo got caught in the current and was presumed drowned. In fact, Dong-joo was saved and later adopted by a rich, childless couple in Japan. 12 years later, Dong-joo returns to Korea as a Japanese gentleman by the name of Yuichi Yamamoto. His feelings towards Ji-soo start to develop, as his friendship with Gi-tae begins to unravel.

Episode summaries

=== Background and Episode 1 ===
Han Dong-joo, Shin Ji-soo and Park Gi-tae were childhood friends who met in the church orphanage. Dong-joo, having malfunctioning kidneys as a child, received a kidney transplant from his friend Gi-tae when his malfunctioning kidneys took a toll on his health. Ji-soo, a rich girl, befriended the two boys. In one gathering in 1989, in front of the church altar at the orphanage, Dong-joo made a promise that he would protect Ji-soo forever. Once, when Ji-soo headed for the church in a car, Gi-tae and Dong-joo raced alongside to catch up with the car Ji-soo was in.

In the autumn of 1992, Dong-joo was drowning in a river whilst trying to pick up an oyster-shaped harmonica Ji-soo dropped as the trio were crossing the river. As Dong-joo drowned into the river, Ji-soo cried out loud for Dong-joo, but was held back by Gi-tae. Dong-joo was later adopted by wealthy Japanese parents after the incident and was brought up Japanese.

Ji-soo's and Ji-suk's father migrated to Japan and reportedly died there. Their mother, yearning for him, fell ill and died shortly after, and they were left to fend for themselves from then on. Gi-tae was brought back home by his parents, but suffered constant torture from Tae-hee and Tae-su, his half-siblings who shared a same father with Gi-tae.

=== Episode 2 ===
Ji-soo was being sent to Japan by her company to secretly take pictures of the affair between Yuichi Yamamoto and Jang Soo-yeon. In the meantime, Yuichi, who happened to be on a plane belonging to the Japan Airlines, played a prank by "accidentally" spilling coke on his neighbouring passenger. Yuichi took the opportunity to promote his insurance sales.

Yuichi happened to be on a luxury cruise with his girlfriend Soo-yeon, and he took her onto the deck to take a look of the ship approaching Kobe before returning to their rooms. As Ji-soo took a second shot of the couple dancing, she was being spotted by Yuichi. He led Soo-yeon out of the room, and hauled Ji-soo out from her hiding place and demanded for an apology.

Ji-soo was brought out on to the starboard, and her camera and handphone were being thrown overboard by Yuichi, following which he stuffed some money at her as compensation of her loss of her accessories. Ji-soo stopped him as he left, and returned the money he gave, saying that she did such work for a living and left.

A guilty Yuichi rushed to the edge of the deck to see Ji-soo leave the ship with the others, but was being hauled back to the galley by Soo-yeon for some wine.

Later, Ji-soo's friend Joo-kyung bought her a new digital camera after Yuichi managed to secure a contract for Ji-soo to work. She met stiff opposition from Soo-yeon, but her excuse was dismissed by Yuichi. Ji-soo photographed Soo-yeon and Yuichi's time shopping for wedding rings and pottery making. The next day, after Joo-kyung brought Ji-soo to a fortune teller and meeting her third man in her life. As she walked down the stairs, she met Yuichi waiting for her, who warned her of work punctuality.

Yuichi led her to wait outside the shop, and happened to encounter an oyster-shaped harmonica. As he played a song, Ji-soo overheard it and thought of the moment Dong-joo drowned while trying to retrieve the harmonica. She rushed inside, only to see Yuichi playing the harmonica. He looked surprised, and asked about Ji-soo's concern. Ji-soo, startled, dismissed his question by saying "Nothing...".

=== Episode 3 ===
That night, after the photography session, Ji-soo returned the smart chip containing the images she photographed of Yuichi and Soo-yeon, lest Yuichi mistook that the images had been tampered with. Yuichi refuted, but Ji-soo left without taking back the smart chip. In the process, she dropped a piece of paper containing her hotel address, which was picked up by Yuichi.

Yuichi gave chase, but was briefly stopped by Soo-yeon. He repeatedly offered to send Ji-soo back, but was being shaken off. As he drove his car to the hotel's pick up point, Ji-soo hailed down a cab, but realised that she had lost the slip of paper containing her address and saw Yuichi holding the piece of paper in his hands. She got out of the cab, and Yuichi told her to get into his car. A reluctant Ji-soo did so, and even needed to be prompted to fasten her seat belt.

In the car, Yuichi tested on her knowledge of Japanese and was surprised that she only knew three phrases. He received a call from his adoptee mother, and immediately drove back home. Once home, he instructed Ji-soo to wait for him in the car.

Yuichi's mother, Keiko, had lost her appetite from her weakened health, and Yuichi had to feed her some oatmeal after some persuasion. Ji-soo got out of the car, seeing Yuichi with another woman. As she turned around to instruct Yuichi to re-adjust his (adoptee) father's portrait, she had a good look at Keiko, realising that she was Yuichi's mother. Keiko spoke to her son, pleading him to be more understanding towards his father. As Keiko touched the face of Yuichi, Ji-soo looked on affectionately...

The next day, Yuichi dropped Ji-soo off the same point he had warned of her work punctuality. He suggested to dine with her the following day before she leaves for South Korea, and handed her a box of lemonated chicken, saying that it would relieve her cold. Yuichi then sped off, as Ji-soo looked on.

Ji-soo did not turn up for the dinner, and was shocked to meet Yuichi looking for her in the plane. She tried to hide her face, but did so only when Yuichi spotted her. Yuichi hauled her out from her hiding place and Ji-soo resisted by making a commotion, complaining to the air-stewardess that Yuichi did not have a plane ticket and was an intruder.

Yuichi responded to the air stewardess (in Japanese) that Ji-soo was his wife and they had a minor quarrel. Yuichi then pulled her out onto the aircraft terminal and prompted her to arrange a time to meet and dine together. Ji-soo initially refused, but gave in, and fixed Namsan as their place, after Yuichi threatened to schedule his destination. Yuichi then took off his watch his mother gave him during his university days and left. Ji-soo tried to return to him, but Yuichi just walked off and bade goodbye from his back. On the plane, and back in Korea, Ji-soo looked at Yuichi's watch intermittently.

Later, Joo-kyung went to look for Ji-soo, but was shocked when an ex-neighbour informed that she had moved out. Se-ah immediately looked for Gi-tae about the matter.

Back in Seoul, Yuichi worked as the director for KUBE, and was introduced to Jeong Song-jin, a manager and secretary. He would occasionally think of Ji-soo. When Ji-soo reported to the manager that she had not gotten Jang's photographs, he got very furious and stormed off, saying that people around him are harassing him. A colleague of Ji-soo her to work for KUBE, of which that day was the final day of job application.

That night, he waited for Ji-soo in accordance to the scheduled appointment fixed by Ji-soo at the airport. She returned the watch Yuichi used as mortgage for this appointment, and Yuichi thanked her for returning it. The duo then entered the restaurant and dined. When Ji-soo gave a flicker of a smile as Yuichi shared a joke, he commented that he would like to see Ji-soo smile, rather than looking frustrated all the time. Just then, Ji-soo received a call from Gi-tae, who asked for her whereabouts.

After dinner, Ji-soo boarded a bus home. From the bus window, Yuichi knocked on it, and told Ji-soo to open it. He requested her to meet again the next day at the same time, same place to dine again, and reiterated that he wanted to befriend her. As the bus left, Ji-soo laughed to herself.

Yuichi waited for Ji-soo the next day as usual and brought a bouquet of flowers, but she did not turn up. Ji-soo, feeling frightened, hid behind a nearby tree until rain came and she left. A disappointed Yuichi followed suit shortly after.

As he drove along the road, he saw Ji-soo and stopped his car. As he rushed forward, a car zoomed by. A man appeared from the car with an umbrella and picked her up. As the man (Gi-tae) drove away, Yuichi looked on with disappointment.

=== Episode 4 ===
Yuichi went jogging one day in Seoul. As he obtained his water bottle from his sports car and undid the zip the jacket he was wearing, a dog approached him and barked, nearly bitting him in the process. The dog owner then came over to call the dog. Yuichi called out to the girl, but she couldn't listen to his call. He stepped forward, and removed her earphones. He asked for an apology from the girl, and refused. Yuichi then continued that he would introduce a new boyfriend at a local night pub and drove off. The girl got severely agitated as he drove off.

Back home, the girl (Tae-hee) was approached by Eun-suh to go to the spa as she trained on her weights. Tae-hee declined the invitation.

Ji-soo took photographs of some orphans celebrating and saw Yuichi entering the hall. He approached her, and Ji-soo wondered if Yuichi is the sponsor for the program, and Yuichi replied that she is taking photographs of these fortunate children. As Gi-tae walked down the stairs with Tae-hee, he happened to encounter a girl resembling Ji-soo. Tae-hee tried to convince him that it wasn't her.

Ji-soo tricked Yuichi to ride on the Roller coaster with the orphans after Yuichi persuaded her to let him take the photographs. Yuichi then dragged her in, and they sat together. As the roller coaster travelled at high speed, she screamed with fear.

As Ji-soo and Yuichi left the roller coaster, she felt dizzy and was approached by a man to take his photograph. Yuichi decided to help Ji-soo fulfill the man's task. The man then offered them to take a shot, and Yuichi pulled in the reluctant Ji-soo to take a shot in front of the roller coaster, saying that it would be a loss if they don't take down this memorable moment.

=== Episode 14 ===
Gi-tae was prompted by his mother to meet a girl, Kim La-yeon. They exchanged greetings when they met at the cafe, and Gi-tae offered to toast a glass with her. La-yeon was shocked as he gulped down quickly several glasses of wine. When Gi-tae offered to sleep with her by booking a room through a waiter, La-yeon picked up a glass of mineral water, splashed at his face, and left.

Gi-tae fell ill after yearning for Ji-soo for a long time. His mother, Jin-soo summoned for a doctor with the help of Tae-hee. That night, as Gi-tae's calls for Ji-soo was overheard by Jin-soo, she immediately rushed to Ji-soo's home and summoned her to visit Gi-tae at once.

=== Episode 15 ===
Ji-soo met a sick Gi-tae, who dismissed her from the room almost immediately upon meeting her. He slammed the door, and locked himself inside the room, and Ji-soo pleaded him to open the door. The couple then exchanged their reflections of their towards each other verbally, and they wept silently.

Jin-soo brought Ji-soo to their living room and confided in her to reconsider Gi-tae to be her partner, as well as to at least help Gi-tae regain his soul even if she rejects him.

Jin-saeng meets his wife Jin-soo, and asked about Gi-tae. He then confided her that he suspected that his oldest son Tae-su did not die of natural causes, and has asked detectives to investigate on the matter.

Dong-joo was prompted to leave for Japan by his father after settling his work. Under persuasion, Dong-joo's father agreed to meet Ji-soo at lunch time on the day before he leaves for Japan. Yukio was utterly shocked upon meeting Ji-soo (and vice versa) with Dong-joo. He excused himself by saying that he had a meeting later on, and left. Ji-soo followed suit shortly after, and Dong-joo gave chase.

Yukio went to Joo-kyung's retail shop, and bought some clothes for Ji-suk. He gave a delayed reply when Joo-kyung asked for Ji-suk's size, and requested Joo-kyung to hand over the purchased stocks to Ji-suk upon meeting him, under the identity of a distant relative.

Tae-hee overheard everything, and offered help to Joo-kyung to hand over the stocks to him by claiming that she would meet Ji-suk later on. Joo-kyung agreed, and handed over the stocks to her.

That night, Yukio went to look for Ji-soo, and found her at the hotel's lounge, waiting for him. Upon seeing Ji-soo, he looked downwards onto the floor with guilt. As the duo had a cup of tea, Ji-soo criticised her father of abandoning them by migrating to Japan, leaving her mother to die waiting for him. Ji-soo also requested that the secret be kept forever between two of them, and not to be made known to Dong-joo and Ji-suk. A guilty Yukio that asked: "What about you?".

An angry Ji-soo responded that Yukio, having the heart of abandoning them, would not have the heart of caring her. With that, she left.

At this point of time, Dong-joo drove up to the hotel's pick-up point and saw Ji-soo rushing out of the hotel. He grabbed hold of her, and Ji-soo complained to him that she hated Yukio, and never wanted to see him again as he did not fulfill his responsibility of being a father. Ji-soo, however, continued that she appreciated the good memories of being with Dong-joo.

=== Episode 16 ===
Hearing that, Dong-joo brought Ji-soo to try on their wedding gown. He asks in hand for marriage to Ji-soo, and said that he would leave for Japan if she does not wish to turn up on their private wedding day.

Ji-soo later went to meet Gi-tae for tea. He apologised for his harassment he brought upon her in the past, and asked for reconciliation of their friendship. Back home, Ji-soo announced his proposal to La-yeon to his family, but met with opposition as they had only met twice. Jin-soo and Tae-hee then persuaded him to reconsider their marriage.

On the wedding day, Gi-tae managed to secure an appointment from Ji-soo for dinner at 6pm. Ji-soo boarded a taxi to the church where her wedding would take place, but hesitated and decided to turn around to her destinated place and meet with Gi-tae instead. Ji-soo became dead drunk after Gi-tae brought her to drink at a roadside food stall.

Jin-soo later went to look for Ji-soo after experiencing a bad dream that her act of killing Tae-su was exposed by her stepdaughter in-law. She pleaded Ji-soo to take care of Gi-tae while she leaves Seoul for the time being.

Back in the hotel, Yukio made his announcement to return to Osaka and urged Yuichi to settle his business in Korea as soon as possible. Yuichi then made his stand that he would not interfere his father's affairs with Ji-soo and Ji-suk anymore.

Meanwhile, Tae-su's wife informed Jin-soo that she had tracked down the killer was Jin-soo, and prompted her to confess her crimes or face consequences.

=== Episode 17 ===
Yukio boarded a taxi to the airport, and left for Japan. Meanwhile, Ji-soo received a parcel from her father, who used the name Shin Jae-man. After signing the parcel, Ji-soo opened it and found several presents for her past birthdays, featuring her presents for her 22nd and 18th birthdays. She also found several bankbooks given by her father, and rushed out to take a breather.

Tae-hee spotted the parcel, and took a look at its contents. On the box of the parcel it states that Shin Jae-man is the sender. Tae-hee then called for her secretary to find out his Korean name. When her secretary confirmed that Jae-man is Yukio's Korean name, she called upon Gi-tae and informed him of this fact. Tae-hee also informed Gi-tae that although Dong-joo and Ji-soo are not related by blood, by law they share a same father and are thus not supposed to marry, and have separated.

Dong-joo wept briefly as he made his way (by car) to the hotel, and met Gi-tae at the second floor. Gi-tae scolded him for abandoning Ji-soo, and that he shouldn't had turned up and disrupted their peaceful life with Ji-soo had the matter evolved into such a state. As Dong-joo remarked "Matters between Ji-soo and I are not for you to interfere", Gi-tae gave him a slap and reprimanded him further before he left. He met Ji-soo that night, and asked for reconciliation of their relations. Gi-tae brought her to a playground and they chatted about their relations with Dong-joo.

Dong-joo was visited by Tani the following day in his company, who took a flight from Japan to inform him that he needs to return to his headquarters in Japan as they are in a crisis. Tani also added the friendly atmosphere of the staff in Japan, in particular the girls.

Dong-joo packed his things at night, to prepare for his return journey to Japan on the following day. Jeong entered his office to offer help, but was rejected. As Jeong talked about his relationship with a girl (Ji-soo), Dong-joo thought about her affectionately.

Ji-soo rushed to the hotel where Dong-joo was supposed to be, only to find out that he had left for the night. Ji-soo then sat down on the bench, and sent an SMS to Dong-joo. They exchanged false information of their whereabouts, before Dong-joo hung up.

The next day, Dong-joo checked out from his hotel to prepare to leave for Japan, but looked back as he thought about the sweet memories he shared with Ji-soo: When he danced with her, and the birthday celebration. He checked out at the reception counter, and received a call from Gi-tae to see him off, an offer he refused earlier to his secretary.

Dong-joo boarded the car which took him to the airport. On the way, he looked at the receipt of his hotel expenses, and spotted a message on Ji-soo. He ordered the driver to turn back to their original destination, and thought about his father's relation with Ji-soo. Dong-joo gave a call to his father, who was in a meeting. When the phone reached his father's, he shouted to him why he didn't tell him earlier. He hung up the phone and wept for a while, before driving to the photo studio where Ji-soo worked, but to find that it was empty, and met Tae-hee. He left after exchanging a few words.

He drove to the restaurant where they met, only to meet with similar luck. When he reached the garden where they met before, he found Ji-soo and rushed up to her.

Meanwhile, Tae-hee returned to her Gi-tae's office to report the matter to him. He was shocked to find out that Dong-joo didn't board on the flight to Japan. That night, Jeong helped Dong-joo to rearrange a room in another hotel in Seoul after deciding not to return to Japan.

Dong-joo asked for a reconciliation, which was rejected by Ji-soo, who cited her mother's death was caused by the absence of her father. She also expressed her hate for Keiko, her father's second wife who jointly adopted Dong-joo. Dong-joo then confessed that he is willing to give up his family for her, and Ji-soo refused, pleading him to separate from her. Dong-joo then covered her eyes and said that their relationship cannot be hidden, just like the sky above their heads.

Jin-soo called upon her son, and asked him to dine with her tomorrow, after her husband entered her room and expressed his will to find out the conspirator of Tae-su's death. His daughter-in-law, meanwhile, had confirmed that Jin-soo is the conspirator and was deciding when to reveal the truth.

Jin-soo met Ji-soo the next day, and requested her to stay by Gi-tae's side. She made another request that even if everybody threw stones at Gi-tae, she should not be doing so and try to protect him. As Jin-soo waited for Ji-soo's agreement, Ji-soo looked down onto the floor.

=== Episode 18 ===
Ji-soo met Tae-hee in her office, and offered coffee. Tae-hee asked Ji-soo whether or not she had separated with Dong-joo. Ji-soo dismissed the necessity to answer her the question. Tae-hee replied that she loved Dong-joo and thus needed to know her stance.

As Gi-tae and Tae-hee were about to leave for office, Jin-soo handed an envelope containing pocket money for her, under the identity of a stepmother and that she had never given her pocket money. Tae-hee rejected the money and requested to seek improvement in their relations before accepting her offer.

At the office, Dong-joo's secretary, Jeong arranged with Ji-soo to work as a part-time employee as they needed her. Under officer Hong's help, and Jeong and persuaded Ji-soo to work as she handed her a stack of files, and successfully at the moment the secretary called her out via handphone. Dong-joo was surprised to see Ji-soo as the new employee when he entered the room, and added that it would be fine if she reject the offer, saying that Ji-soo still loved him. Ji-soo then took up the offer.

Tae-hee arranged a meeting with Dong-joo by giving a call to his office. They met in a restaurant, and Dong-joo offered to order some dishes before going on with her point. Tae-hee went straight to the point, and proposed to him by saying that he could give little to her. Dong-joo criticised her by saying that if she had liked him, she would have told him about his father's Korean name, rather than beating round the bush and even let Gi-tae know about it through her.

Meanwhile, Ji-soo dined with Gi-tae in a restaurant. She expressed her wish to receive a call from him first rather than receiving surprise meeting such as appearing suddenly in front of her house. Gi-tae agreed to her wish.

Jin-soo put on her husband's coat, and asked him to dine with her for lunch that day. Her husband refuted and decided to hold it on another day. Jin-soo arranged it at his company, and said that she would be going for a holiday. Jin-soo offered to shorten the holiday after he said that she was only going on a holiday.

The duo turned up for lunch, and Jin-soo expressed her stance that they are dining together for the first time. Jin-sung then replied that he would repay her eventually in time.

Before Jin-soo left, she look for Ah-suh, who expressed her disbelief when she discovered that Jin-soo was the conspirator. She handed an envelope containing her shares in Dae Young to Ah-suh. Jin-soo then pleads for forgivance, saying that she had lost her mind while plotting against Tae-su, and did so for Gi-tae. Jin-soo also pleaded not to involve Gi-tae into this matter. Ah-suh wept at these words.

Ah-suh went to look for Gi-tae for removing a painting for the gallery, and then asked for his opinion as President Park's heir-apparent of his company. Gi-tae suspected Ah-suh's intentions and asked why she is so concerned about him, and that he would feel uneasy. At this time, his secretary, via the intercom system informed that President Park wanted to see him. President Park then stormed into the room angrily as the duo greeted him and scolded Gi-tae: "Bloody Rascal!"

Gi-tae returned home, only to see an angry Tae-hee chasing him out of the household. She expressed her feelings of whom to trust in the household, and announced that she would leave if he didn't leave. As she walked out, Gi-tae grabbed her hand and said that he would leave, and thanked her for the good past times he shared with her, and being a good younger sister and apologised. As he left for the room, Tae-hee burst into tears.

Dong-joo checked the offices before leaving. He closed the light of a vacant room, but heard Ji-soo calling the person to reopen the lights. As he hesitated, Ji-soo switched on the lights and found him at the doorstep. Ji-soo told him that she had something to say, but hesitated as Dong-joo's phone rang, only to receive a call from Tae-hee that something bad happened to their family. Ji-soo decided to postpone her confession and told Dong-joo to rush to their home.

Gi-tae, driving his car, thought of his father earlier scolding him "Bloody Rascal!" repeatedly, (Ah-suh smiling subtly at the side) and hearing his father "Wanting to be the heir by resorting to killing Tae-su?", which shocked him badly as he pushed him to the ground. As his father left, he expressed his thought that he shouldn't have known his mother and give birth to him as he left. Meanwhile, Ji-soo felt suspicious as she couldn't get through Gi-tae by phone.

Dong-joo arrived at Gi-tae's house, only to find Tae-hee sitting alone, crying as she hugged a bolster. Tae-hee said that Ah-suh had discovered that both Jin-soo and Gi-tae had conspirated to kill Tae-su. Dong-joo then said that Gi-tae is a person who wouldn't commit such an act. At this time, Ji-soo called him, and Dong-joo requested Tae-hee to return to her room first. Ji-soo denied receiving any calls from Gi-tae when Dong-joo asked about him.

Dong-joo went to Tae-hee's room, who expressed her past efforts to reconcile with Jin-soo and Gi-tae, and her doubts to trust who in the household after the ordeal. (Their conversation was briefly interrupted by a call, and Tae-hee then asked him to stay a little longer). Dong-joo then expressed his belief that Gi-tae played no part in it.

Dong-joo then looked for President Park in his room, and expressed his firm belief that Gi-tae played no part in it, whom President Park said that he was rude. Dong-joo continued that Gi-tae, as a young boy, had encouraged both Ji-soo and himself to be independent, and his other good points. When he asked if President Park would look for Gi-tae, he thought to himself. Dong-joo then replied that he got the message and left. At the office, he arranged for his secretary to search for Gi-tae.

Gi-tae was drinking beer in a restaurant as Eun-suh approached him. Gi-tae asked her intentions of doing this to him, and said that she could do the same as what Jin-soo has done. However, she showed sympathy to the state she had brought upon him. Before she left, Gi-tae expressed his belief that she was the last person she met and asked what Jin-soo had said to her. Eun-suh said that Jin-soo had told her not to involve her Gi-tae over this matter.

A despaired Gi-tae drove to the riverside, nearly sitting down on a bench and sinking onto the floor. He screamed a few times, before muttering: "Mum, why didn't you tell me earlier? Why let yourself alone alone?" With that he broke out into tears.

=== Episode 19 ===
Dong-joo went through the documents with his colleagues on Gi-tae, and told them to continue their search. At this time, Ji-soo received a parcel from Jin-soo, and requested Joo-kyung to go after the postman who had left shortly before. As she opened the box, she found a shirt of an infant, and several bank books. A letter, written by Jin-soo, stated that Ji-soo would have known the truth by then, and that she pleaded Ji-soo to hand over the money, and to take care of Gi-tae while she is not around. Jin-soo also mentioned that the shirt was the shirt Gi-tae first worn as a baby and was knitted by Jin-soo when she was pregnant with Gi-tae.

A curious Ji-soo approached Tae-hee to find out more about Gi-tae, who answered her with hostility initially but revealed that Dong-joo did not wish that she would know the truth of Gi-tae's disappearance. Tae-hee then revealed the truth to Ji-soo, that Gi-tae left home after being accused of being the conspirator against Tae-su's death, in which case he was innocent. She then expressed her worry for him.

Shocked, Ji-soo went to Dong-joo's lodge and fainted as she expressed her strong desire to search for him. Dong-joo brought her to bed and thought to himself about the past experiences when he first met Gi-tae again with their guardian Mother Theresa at the church where they grew up; his anger and happiness of meeting Dong-joo again after twelve years.

The next morning, Dong-joo calmed Ji-soo downed as she expressed that Gi-tae had disappeared for a month. Dong-joo consoled her that Gi-tae would be fine. The phone suddenly rang, and his secretary reported that the detectives had located Gi-tae's whereabouts.

At the office, the detectives showed Gi-tae's photographs, which were taken at South Chungcheong Province around a sea-side town. Dong-joo then instructed them to print every single photograph at enlarged size carefully.

Dong-joo then drove to the destination, through the narrow streets of the town and rushed up to the lodge where Gi-tae was alleged to be staying at. Dong-joo shouted for Gi-tae as he climbed up the stairs, only to meet the lodge keeper. Dong-joo then showed a photo of Gi-tae, which she described that she met a man surnamed "Park" and had eyebrows exactly the same as with Gi-tae's photo, but he was thinner. Dong-joo then reconfirmed with her and learnt that he had left that morning.

Dong-joo went hunting for Gi-tae by asking around the local inhabitants, and called out to a man with a sturture of Gi-tae, which turned out to be a stranger. That evening, as he looked across a beach, his attention turned to a neighbouring islet which stood out near the coastline.

That night, he asked a passerby whether he had met Gi-tae. All the same, the passerby replied that he had no impression. Dong-joo then proceed to a dilapidated house, and looked inside. The house was dark, filled with straw and boxes. There was a fireplace, and Dong-joo went over to see a man wearing in blue jacket, covering his face. Dong-joo took down his jacket, and saw that it was Gi-tae. Gi-tae eventually woke up and stormed away from Dong-joo.

Gi-tae said that he would run away, or he would rather die if Dong-joo keep following him. Dong-joo shouted that if he chose to die, then he should lest die in front of him. At this moment, Dong-joo's handphone rang, and Ji-soo asked if he had found Gi-tae. Dong-joo hesitated before saying no, and Ji-soo expressed how was Gi-tae doing. Dong-joo put his phone to Gi-tae's ears, who put it down on Dong-joo's chest.

Gi-tae walked along the beach drinking a glass of beer, in the light snow. They sat together, and Gi-tae asked what was his wish when he first met Gi-tae. Dong-joo asked back, but Gi-tae said that he asked him first. Dong-joo then said that he would reveal the truth twelve years from now, and Gi-tae said that he would reveal it eleven years and eight months from now when asked.

Gi-tae then asked what he would do if he had the chance to return to childhood. Dong-joo wished that he could live with a happy family; parents, brothers and sisters. Gi-tae then said that he is in a luckier position that Dong-joo, at least briefly. He talked about Tae-hee, a good sister who cared about him deeply. Dong-joo then informed that Tae-hee and President Park were very worried about him. Gi-tae then talked about the fact that why didn't his mother decide to meet him, and said that he never said that he loved her as he looked at his handphone. As he said these, Gi-tae wept in Dong-joo's shoulders.

Dong-joo carried a dazed Gi-tae back to his chalet, and carried him onto his bed. He thought to himself that Gi-tae was a strong man who feared nothing, but tonight Gi-tae showed that he is a person who needed friends. Dong-joo then went outside to give Ji-soo a call that he had found Gi-tae. Ji-soo asked about his condition, and Dong-joo said that he was sleeping peacefully. Ji-soo said that she would come over right away, but Dong-joo replied that she should stay in Seoul or wait at least until tomorrow.

Ji-soo took a coach to the town. In the bus, she took out Gi-tae's infant shirt for a look. When she finally reached the chalet Gi-tae was in, she was greeted by Dong-joo, who brought her to where Gi-tae was sleeping. He was shocked to see her when he eventually woke up, and called for Dong-joo. Gi-tae then asked for Dong-joo's marriage with Ji-soo or Ji-soo should go back to Seoul alone, and he himself would not seek medical treatment.

Dong-joo then said that such matters were not for him to influence his decision, and Gi-tae replied that his medical treatment is not for Dong-joo to influence his decision. When Dong-joo requested to discuss the matter with him, Gi-tae reinforced that there is nothing to discuss about.

Dong-joo brought him to a cafe, and Gi-tae prompted him to make his decision by today, and left. At the beach, Gi-tae reinforced his point against Dong-joo and Ji-soo, and said that they better return to Seoul if they decline. As he left for the chalet, Dong-joo and Ji-soo looked at each other.

=== Episode 20 ===
Dong-joo and Ji-soo sat in Dong-joo's car and decided whether to conduct the marriage. They decided that their time had come and decided to marry, partially for Gi-tae's sake. Dong-joo had asked that she should not force herself to marry if she does not have the heart to do so, and return to Seoul.

The couple returned to their chalet to meet Gi-tae, who had been looking out of the window. He patted on the shoulders of the couple, and said that they should lead a happy life. He also warned Dong-joo not to let Ji-soo get hurt.

During dinner, Gi-tae, Dong-joo and Ji-soo propose to the prosperity of their friendship and Dong-joo and Ji-soo's marriage. Gi-tae then cuddled beside Ji-soo and used his handphone camera to take a photograph for commemorative sake.

Dong-joo and Gi-tae took a stroll along the beach the next day, which Dong-joo prompted him to return to the chalet in view of the cold winter. As Gi-tae took his time to play with some rocks, Dong-joo received a call from Tae-hee, asking whether he had found Gi-tae and his well-being. Gi-tae then went over to ask who called when Dong-joo hung up, and asked if it was Tae-hee when he mentioned a friend. Gi-tae voiced his concern if Dong-joo had not told his whereabouts, which Dong-joo claimed that he had not.

Eun-suh went over to the town to visit Gi-tae, and had tea in a cafe. She asked if Jin-soo had since contacted him, which he denied. When Eun-suh talked about his father, Gi-tae changed the topic and did not wish to hear about it. As he got up to leave, he coughed badly, and Eun-suh handed him a tissue paper. Gi-tae grabbed a towel from the table and was shocked to see that he coughed out blood. When Ah-suh saw it, she prompted him to visit a doctor. Gi-tae replied that it was too late; he is entering the final stage of his life and would die eventually. He also replied that if being apologetic, she should not visit him again and make no mention of his whereabouts to their family. With that he left.

Back at the chalet, Gi-tae kept coughing out blood and used a towel to wipe away his blood. He later joined Ji-soo in a conversation and told her a story of a person who had lived for 99 days without food, but why couldn't he lived up to the 100th day? As he said these, Ji-soo thanked him for his dedication towards her and hugged him.

At the chalet, Dong-joo spoke to secretaries Jeong and Hong via Internet relay to update with the company's status. Jeong requested him to return to Japan quickly, as the company there needed him as well as his father's health concerns. Dong-joo also arranged with Jeong for Gi-tae to seek medical treatment. That night, Dong-joo saw a sick Gi-tae lying on bed, and found a bottle of pills in his pocket.

At Gi-tae's house, Tae-hee voiced her concerns to her father and appealed him to look for Gi-tae. Jin-sung replied that she should be thankful for not reporting the matter to the police. As he ordered Tae-hee to leave the room, he thought to himself.

Gi-tae locked himself in the toilet, and recited his final wishes and recollections: That Dong-joo is a strong man when they competed for Ji-soo, that Ji-soo had given him a lot of love, and without him, it is all up to Dong-joo to take care of Ji-soo. As he went into his room to put on the coat, he coughed profusely and stumbled onto bed. Ji-soo and Dong-joo were dressing up for the wedding as Gi-tae struggled to get out of the hotel.

Ji-soo and Dong-joo waited for Gi-tae to arrive at the church. Ji-soo cried out as she confessed to Dong-joo that she is indebted to Gi-tae heavily. Dong-joo then told her to stop crying once Gi-tae arrives. As they stood up and went to the altar and looked at Jesus Christ briefly, Dong-joo suddenly tugged Ji-soo's hands, fearing that something bad might have happened to him. Together with Ji-soo, he drove back to the hotel.

Gi-tae, coughing out blood profusely, which even stained his shirt. He stood up, and wished farewell to Dong-joo and Ji-soo as he walked deeper and deeper into the evening winter sea. The next scene showed Gi-Tae's motionless body lying on a beach, occasionally touched by the sea waves.

Tae-hee and her father rushed to the hotel where Gi-tae was staying. Tae-hee tried to locate Gi-tae, but used Dong-joo's name instead when the reception did not have Gi-tae's name in the registration books. At this time, Ji-soo and Dong-joo came rushing into the hotel. Tae-hee came rushing up to them, and said that if they had seen Gi-tae.

At this time, a policeman brought a green jacket from the counter, saying that it was found on the beach. The policeman showed a wallet with Gi-tae's identity card, and asked Dong-joo to reconfirm if it was Gi-tae's. As he looked on, he was shocked with disbelief. Ji-soo and Dong-joo ran out of the hotel, and onto the beach, where they shouted for Gi-tae repeatedly. Dong-joo's face, twisted with sadness, sunk onto the beach as he called for him, with Ji-soo to comfort and restrain him.

Later, at the spot where Dong-joo drowned as a young boy, Dong-joo suggested to Ji-soo that Gi-tae had no intentions of receiving medical treatment. They held the hope and belief that Gi-tae is doing fine and will return in twelve years time.

Dong-joo bade goodbye to Jeong as he prepared to leave for Japan. He also paid a visit to President Park, saying that he would leave for Japan the following day. As Park requested to tell him about Gi-tae, he confessed that he would frequently think of Gi-tae, and it is too late to salvage his wrongdoings to him.

As Dong-joo left the room, he met Tae-hee. As they chatted in the living room, she requested permission from Dong-joo to contact each other whenever they think of Gi-tae. She then wished Dong-joo a smooth journey back to Japan.

Ji-soo packed her things, and handed a bankbook containing assets for Joo-kyung. Joo-kyung initially refused, but accepted as she requested her to take good care of Ji-suk when she's abroad.

At the airport, Ji-soo and Dong-joo arrived at the immigration counter, and Ji-soo asked Dong-joo to help her fill up an application form. Before they left, Dong-joo asked her to take care, and shooked her hands. He then pulled her into his arms and they hugged each other for a long time, before Ji-soo handed her ticket to the controller. As she entered the departure hall, she turned back to take a last look at Dong-joo. As she left, he thought about the moment when they wished if Gi-tae could return to Korea in 12 years time.

At this time, the airport controllers called for Yamamoto Yuichi to board the Osaka flight immediately. Dong-joo then gathered up his courage and headed for the flight.
