= The Last Supper (2003 film) =

- Theatrical poster
- Hangul: 최후의 만찬
- Hanja: 최후의 晩餐
- RR: Choehuui manchan
- MR: Ch'oehuŭi manch'an
- Directed by: Son Yeong-guk
- Written by: Lee Ji-ho
- Produced by: Lee Jung-ho
- Starring: Kim Bo-seong; Jo Yoon-hee; Lee Jong-won
- Cinematography: Jeong Jae-seung
- Edited by: Moon In-dae
- Music by: Jang Ho-il
- Distributed by: Aura Entertainment
- Release date: 14 November 2003
- Running time: 99 minutes
- Country: South Korea
- Language: Korean

The Last Supper (Korean: 최후의 만찬; RR: Choehuui manchan), also known as Come Tomorrow, is a 2003 South Korean film directed by Son Yeong-guk.

The film is about three people on the verge of ending their lives—a malpracticing doctor just released from prison, a young woman with debt problems and a terminal illness, and a gangster on the run from a rival gang—who meet each other by chance and start to turn their fortunes around.

== Cast ==
- Kim Bo-sung as So-ju
- Jo Yoon-hee as Jae-rim
- Lee Jong-won as Gong-bong

== Release ==
The Last Supper was released in South Korea on 14 November 2003, receiving a total of 9,863 admissions in Seoul.
