= Likeable or Not =

- Promotional poster
- Genre: Romance, Drama
- Written by: Kim Sa-kyung; Choi Hyung-ja
- Directed by: Lee Duk-gun
- Starring: Han Ji-hye; Kim Ji-seok
- Country of origin: South Korea
- Original language: Korean
- No. of episodes: 175

Production
- Producer: Kim Myung-wook
- Running time: 30 minutes

Original release
- Network: KBS1 (2007–2008); Indosiar (2011–2013); B-Channel (2013–2015); NET. (29 August 2022-present)
- Release: September 3, 2007 – May 2, 2008

Likeable or Not (Korean: 미우나 고우나; RR: Miuna gouna; lit. 'I Hate You, But It's Fine') is a South Korean television series starring Han Ji-hye, Kim Ji-seok, Jo Dong-hyuk, Yoo In-young, and Lee Young-eun. The daily drama aired on KBS1 from September 3, 2007 to May 2, 2008 on Mondays to Fridays at 20:25 for 172 episodes.

It was one of the most highly rated Korean dramas since 2000, reaching a peak viewership rating of 43.9%.

== Synopsis ==
=== Baek-ho and Dan-poong ===
Baek-ho and Dan-poong first meet during Dan-poong company food testing at a mart. They continue to run into each other in various farcical situations. Baek-ho eventually starts working in the marketing department of Bonjour Foods, where Dan-poong is his superior. At first, she is exasperated by his inexperience, but is eventually impressed by his work ethic and innovative ideas.

Baek-ho falls in love with Dan-poong, but is afraid to tell her because Dan-poong is dating his high school classmate, Hyun-woo. Hyun-woo is a doctor from a wealthy family, and is therefore a very eligible bachelor. However, Dan-poong realises that she doesn't love Hyun-woo. Hyun-woo decides to leave to America so that DanPung can search for her own happiness. Sometime after, Dan-poong realizes she loves Baek-ho.

Baek-ho and Dan-poong want to get married, but must first endure the fierce opposition of her mother and brother Seon-jae, who also hates Baek-ho for being his boss's stepson and favorite (see below). During his cruel reign at the helm of the company, Seon-jae relegates Baek-ho to do menial work and hard tasks to prevent having him as a rival in the company. Dan-poong's mother eventually relents after Dan-poong protests by starving herself. Once married, they are a very happy couple. About two years after their wedding, Dan-poong becomes pregnant.

=== Seon-jae, Soo-ah, and Ji-young ===
Seon-jae and Ji-young have been dating for about 8 years. Ji-young was a loyal girlfriend, and stood by Seon-jae throughout college, his study abroad and army service. They are in love and plan to get married.

Soo-ah, to keep her mind off the fact that her father is marrying another woman who already has a son, meets Seon-jae and becomes infatuated with him. She chases him relentlessly, ignoring the fact that he already has a fiancée. Helping Soo-ah is her grandmother, who wants to give Soo-ah everything she wants, and Seon-jae's hypocritical mother, who craves wealth and power for her son. Eventually, Seon-jae is swayed, and cruelly dumps Ji-young to marry Soo-ah.

Seon-jae and Soo-ah's marriage is not happy, because Soo-ah is selfish and spoiled. She is also very jealous that Seon-jae may still have feelings for Ji-young. Seon-jae does in fact have feelings for Ji-young, especially because Soo-ah is selfish, and Ji-young was a sweet and kind person. Although they do not have an affair, Seon-jae continues to go see Ji-young whenever he is stressed. He even asks Ji-young if she would get back together with him, and even gives help to Ji-young's family when they have financial troubles without being asked.

After marrying Soo-ah, Seon-jae is given a very high position in Bonjour Foods. While working there, he acts very arrogant and above the law. He eventually creates a slush fund, and bribes a government official. When Man-soo finds out of this, he suffers a brain hemorrhage, and goes into a coma. During Man-soo's coma, Seon-jae is promoted to Bonjour's president. But Man-soo eventually wakes from his coma and, with Baek-ho's help, fires Seon-jae. The police have also begun to investigate Seon-jae's crimes. Due to this scrutiny, Seon-jae's father resigns from his position in the government. After seeing his father sacrifice himself for him, Seon-jae finally repents for his misdeeds. He divorces Soo-ah to spare her the burden, and turns himself in to the police. Soo-ah goes to Paris to forget about Seon-jae.

After serving time, Seon-jae begins to work at an organic farm, and enjoys his modest and hardworking life. Soo-ah returns from Paris, and they get back together. They also stop hating Baek-ho and accept both his status as a member of the family and his marriage to Dan-poong.

After being dumped by Seon-jae, Ji-Young is devastated and takes a long time getting over Seon-jae. She reconnects with an old classmate, Woo-jin, who had a crush on her in the past, but gave her up because she already had a boyfriend. After tentatively dating Woo-jin for a while, she eventually decides to marry him. At the end of the series, they are a happy couple.

=== Man-soo and Dong-ji ===
Man-soo and Dong-ji were young and in love, but broke up because Man-soo's mother, Mrs. Choi opposed the marriage. Man-soo married another woman, and then became widowed. Later on, they reconnected, and marry again. Man-soo's mother still opposes this marriage, but finally relents. After the marriage, she continues to treat Dong-ji badly, and also her son, Baek-ho.

Dong-ji suffers under Mrs. Choi's abuse for a long time, but Mrs. Choi eventually sees that Dong-ji is a good person, and accepts both her and Baek-ho as members of the family. At the end of the series, Baek-ho is revealed to be the biological son of Man-soo. It is never revealed why Dong-ji never told this to anyone, or whether she knew it herself. With this, all opposition by Mrs. Choi is dropped permanently. In the final episode, we learn that Dong-ji is pregnant.

== Cast ==
=== Main characters ===
- Han Ji-hye as Na Dan-poong
- Kim Ji-seok as Kang Baek-ho
- Jo Dong-hyuk as Na Seon-jae

Na Dan-poong's older brother. Good looking and well-educated with an MBA from a U.S. school, he is a fund manager at a company. He is more ambitious than his government official father.

- Yoo In-young as Bong Soo-ah

Bong Man-soo's daughter, who lost her mother at a young age. She briefly studied art in France, but dropped out and returned to Korea. Having grown up as a rich family's only child, and spoiled by her grandmother, she is very immature and selfish. She is vehemently against her father's remarriage, and treats her step-mother Dong-ji and step-brother Baek-ho coldly. She becomes infatuated with Na Seon-jae.

- Lee Young-eun as Hwang Ji-young

Seon-jae's college sweetheart. Like Soo-ah, she is also an only child who lost her mother at a young age. Sweet and thoughtful most of the time, she still knows how to stand up for herself. She is very devoted to her boyfriend Seon-jae; unfortunately, her love is ruined by Bong Soo-ah's infatuation, who makes Seon-jae break off their relationship and marry Soo-ah. She works as a veterinarian at an animal hospital with her father, who is also a vet.

=== Supporting characters ===
Na family

- Kang In-deok as Na Gi-tae

Seon-jae and Dan-poong's father. A stern disciplinarian to his children, and old-fashioned husband to his wife, Jong-soon. Works as a government official. He is very firm about what is right and wrong, and values modesty and humility. As such, his personality is somewhat inflexible.

- Kim Hye-ok as Lee Jong-soon

Seon-jae and Dan-poong's mother. Sly, greedy, and phony, she is dissatisfied with the modest lifestyle she has with her husband, and is frustrated by his rigid personality. A friend of Dong-ji since junior high school, she felt better about her life to see Dong-ji suffer as a widowed, single mother. But she becomes very jealous when she discovers that Dong-ji is marrying Man-soo. Curries favor with Mrs. Choi to fulfill her dreams of material wealth and status. Seems to regret marrying off his son to Soo-ah, now that she finds out that Soo-ah isn't actually the best of daughters-in-law. A loving mother, she sometimes seems to be in conflict over her greed and her love for her family.

Kang family

- Kim Hae-sook as Oh Dong-ji

Was a beauty salon owner, and widowed mother of Baek-ho. Falls in love with Man-soo but endures the fierce opposition of Mrs. Choi. After marrying Man-soo, she continues to endure Mrs. Choi's abuse, who makes her do all the housework and blames her for everything.

- Kim Chan-woo as Oh Dal-hyun

Dong-ji's younger brother. Like his nephew Baek-ho, Dal-hyun is kind, but not very reliable. Met his wife Mi-ae when they worked together as extras, but Mi-ae divorced him after his business goes bankrupt. He works in an "event company" which provides various party planning and promotion services. Drifts around with no place to go with his son Chan at the beginning of the series. Currently staying with Dong-ji at Man-soo's house. Has been dating the house-guest of Ji-young's, Sonya, much to the consternation of his ex-wife, Mi-ae.

- Park Jun-mok as Oh Chan

Cute and smart son of Dal-hyun and Mi-ae, about six years old. Although very clever, he's still a kid who cries for his mother. Miraculously earns the affection of Mrs. Choi, who hates everyone in Dong-ji's family but Chan.

Bong family

- Kim Young-ok as Mrs. Choi

Mother of Bong Man-soo. Raised her granddaughter Soo-ah since childhood, and spoiled her rotten. Very shrewd about protecting her family reputation and fortune. Opposed Man-soo's remarriage to Dong-ji because of her unremarkable background and divorced status. She relents only after making Dong-ji secretly pledge that she will not officially certify her marriage, and will make no claim to Man-soo's money and assets.

- Lee Jung-gil as Bong Man-soo

President of the large company Bonjour Foods. Lives with regret after his wife's death, but reunites with Dong-ji, his first love. Also regards Dong-ji's son Baek-ho as his own. He seems somewhat oblivious to the conflicts between Dong-ji and his mother.

Hwang family

- Seo Seung-hyun as Hwang Dal-rae

Jae-bok's older sister and Ji-young's aunt. She farms in a rural province, but often stays at her brother's house in Seoul.

- Kim Sung-hwan as Hwang Jae-bok

Lost his wife during the birth of their only child, Ji-young. Extremely devoted to his daughter. Is a veterinarian and owns an animal hospital.

- Lee Ja-hyun as Hwang Mi-ae

Jae-bok's younger sister and Ji-young's aunt. Recently divorced from Oh Dal-hyun, she lives with Jae-bok. She worked in small extra roles before her marriage, and now wants to become a famous actress. Gossipy and opinionated, Mi-ae always says what she thinks. Although she loves her son, Chan, her dreams of acting keeps her from being a good mother to him.

- Eva Popiel as Sonya

"Koryo-saram," or immigrant from Kazakhstan who works very hard to send money home to her family. Works at an "event company" with Dal-hyun. Rents a room at Jae-bok's house. She and Oh Dal-hyun fall in love, much to the consternation of Hwang Mi-ae.

Extended cast

- Lee Joong-moon as Jang Hyun-woo

A successful plastic surgeon, and high school classmate of Baek-ho. His parents are wealthy and currently live in the U.S. Meets Dan-poong during a blind date, and begins to court her. They get engaged, mostly due to family pressures, but Dan-poong soon realises that they are both incompatible after they have set their date for their engagement, and so breaks off the relationship.

- Ban Eul-soo

A pet groomer who works at Hwang Jae-bok's animal hospital.

- Lee Sang-yoon as Seo Woo-jin

Ji-young's college friend. After studying abroad, begins to work at Bonjour Foods as a research scientist.

- Ko Mi-sook

Works with Baek-ho and Dan-poong in the marketing department of Bonjour Foods. Friends with Dan-poong, who confides in Mi-sook about her personal life.

- Han Kyung-sun as Geum-ja
- Park Jung-woo as Team leader Park

Seon-jae's assistant at Bonjour Foods.

- Baek Seung-hee as Lee Soo-jung
- Seo Yoon-jae

Works with Baek-ho and Dan-poong in the marketing department of Bonjour Foods. She has a big crush on Baek-ho.

- Yoon Joo-hee as Seo Joo-kyung

Works with Baek-ho and Dan-poong in the marketing department of Bonjour Foods.

- Choi Seung-kyung as Mr. Shin

Works with Baek-ho and Dan-poong in the marketing department of Bonjour Foods.

- Kwon Oh-hyeon as Event office president

== Awards ==
2007 KBS Drama Awards

- Excellence Award, Actress: Han Ji-hye
- Best New Actor: Kim Ji-seok

2008 2nd Korea Drama Awards

- Excellence Award, Actress: Han Ji-hye

== International broadcast ==
- Philippines: TV5 aired from June 17, 2013 until February 21, 2014 on Mondays to Fridays at 12:00 NN. TeleAsia Filipino rebroadcast from June 9, 2014 on Daily at 7:00 PM.
