= Pied Piper (TV series) =

2016 South Korean police procedural-crime drama

- Promotional poster
- Genre: Action; Thriller; Crime; Drama
- Created by: (CJ E&M); Choi Jin-hee; Park Ji-young
- Written by: Ryoo Yong-jae
- Directed by: Kim Hong-seon
- Starring: Shin Ha-kyun; Jo Yoon-hee; Yoo Jun-sang
- Composer: Gaemi
- Country of origin: South Korea
- Original language: Korean
- No. of episodes: 16

Production
- Executive producer: Park Ho-sik
- Producers: Kim Sung-min; Pyeong chang-woo Kim Jin-i
- Running time: 75 minutes
- Production company: Content K

Original release
- Network: tvN
- Release: March 7 – April 26, 2016

Pied Piper (Korean: 피리부는 사나이; RR: Piribuneun sanai) is a 2016 South Korean police procedural-crime drama television series. It replaced Cheese in the Trap and aired on cable network tvN on Mondays and Tuesdays at 23:00 (KST) for 16 episodes from March 7 to April 26, 2016.

== Synopsis ==
Pied Piper focuses on a police negotiation task force that specializes in tense, worst-case scenarios that require highly trained communication. They handle all sorts of cases, from suicide to hostage situations to terrorist attacks, and even war. They do their work with words, not weapons, to neutralize volatile situations before they erupt into full-blown catastrophes.

Joo Sung-chan (Shin Ha-kyun) is a genius lead negotiator of the crisis negotiation police unit. Meanwhile, Yoon Hee-sung (Yoo Jun-sang) is the anchor of TNN Night News channel. Yeo Myung-ha (Jo Yoon-hee) is an inspector of the Crisis Negotiation Team.

== Cast ==
=== Main ===
- Shin Ha-kyun as Joo Sung-chan – A genius negotiator in the past, currently an outside advisor of the police Crisis Negotiation Team
  - Choi Won-hong as young Joo Sung-chan
- Jo Yoon-hee as Yeo Myung-ha – An inspector, Crisis Negotiation Team member
  - Jeon Min-seo as young Yeo Myung-ha
- Yoo Jun-sang as Yoon Hee-sung – The real Pied Piper, an anchor of TNN Night News channel
- Lee Shin-sung as Jung Soo-kyung – A Pied Piper

=== People around Joo Sung-chan ===
- Jung Gook-hwan as Seo Geon-il – K-Group chairman
- Choi Won-hong as Seo Joon – Seo Geon-il's son
- Park Sung-geun as Kang Hong-seok – K-Group management director, chairman's brother-in-law
- Kim Hong-fa as Jung Tae-soo – a member of Assembly

=== People around Yeo Myung-ha ===
- Jo Jae-yoon as Han Ji-hoon – SWAT team leader
- Lee Jung-eun as Oh Ha-na – police officer of general switchboard 112
- Yoo Seung-mok as Gong Ji-man – Crisis Negotiation Team leader
- Oh Eui-shik as Choi Sung-beom – Sergeant, digital forensic expert
- Jang Seong-beom as Jo Jae-hee – Sergeant, profiler
- Kim Jong-soo as Yang Dong-woo – Seoul district police chief

=== People around Yoon Hee-sung ===
- Jung Hae-na as Yoon Bo-ram – TNN channel social affairs reporter, Yoon Hee-sung's junior

=== Extended ===
- Go Yoon as Jung Hyun-ho – brother of the victim who died during the hostage kidnapping in the Philippines
- Kim Ji-eun as Part-timer at the PC room
- Jung Dong-gyu as director Lee Joon-kyung
- Park Ji-hwan as Heo Tae-woong – the bank robber
- Kwon Hyuk-joon – attempts suicide on the Han river bridge
- Woo Jung-gook as Kim Jae-gon
- Kwak Dong-yeon as Gong Jung-in – Gong Ji-man's son
- Park Choong-seok as Noh Kyung-seok – former TNN syndicate president
- Lee Kan-hee as Moon Ji-hye – a doctor, Oh Jung-hak's friend
- Kim Ik-tae as judge
- Park Hyo-seon
- Gong Ye-ji as Yeon Joon-hee
- Kim Ki-moo as Goo Dong-man
- Park Shi-in as Jung Chan-gyu
- Shin Cheol-jin as Shin Won-chang
- Ham Sung-min as PC cafe customer
- Kim Byung-choon as factory magamement director
- Na Kwang-hoon
- Cha Soon-hyung
- Kim Jung-seok as factory's CEO
- Yang Fan
- Cao Fei Fei as Shanshan
- Lee Won-jong as detective Lee Cheol-yong
- Lee Hae-young
- Heo Min-young
- Yoo Joon-hong as airplane hacker
- Kim Ji-eun

=== Special appearances ===
- Sung Dong-il as Oh Jung-hak – former Crisis Negotiation Team leader
- Kim Min-seo as Lee Joo-eun – Joo Sung-chan's lover
- Lee Moo-saeng as Prosecutor (Ep.6)

== Ratings ==
In this table, the blue numbers represent the lowest ratings and the red numbers represent the highest ratings.

Ep.	Original broadcast date	Average audience share	
Ep.	Original broadcast date	AGB Nielsen	TNmS
Ep.	Original broadcast date	Nationwide	Nationwide
1	March 7, 2016	3.307%	3.0%
2	March 8, 2016	3.625%	3.5%
3	March 14, 2016	2.347%	2.2%
4	March 15, 2016	2.516%	2.3%
5	March 21, 2016	2.066%	2.0%
6	March 22, 2016	1.428%	1.6%
7	March 28, 2016	1.869%	1.5%
8	March 29, 2016	2.036%	2.0%
9	April 4, 2016	2.170%	2.0%
10	April 5, 2016	2.421%	1.7%
11	April 11, 2016	1.452%	1.3%
12	April 12, 2016	1.900%	1.8%
13	April 18, 2016	1.464%	1.5%
14	April 19, 2016	1.744%	1.8%
15	April 25, 2016	1.891%	1.5%
16	April 26, 2016	1.932%	1.7%
Average		2.136%	2.0%

- This drama airs on a cable channel/pay TV which normally has a relatively smaller audience compared to free-to-air TV/public broadcasters (KBS, SBS, MBC and EBS).
