= Lee Dong-gun =

South Korean actor, singer and model (born 1980)

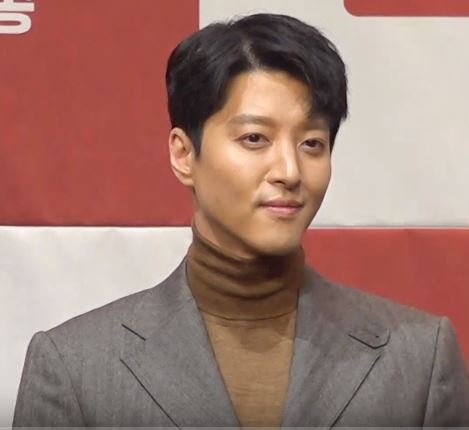
- Lee in October 2019
- Born: 26 July 1980 (age 46); Seoul, South Korea
- Occupations: Actor; singer; model
- Years active: 1998–present
- Agent: FNC Entertainment
- Spouse: Jo Yoon-hee (m. 2017; div. 2020)
- Children: 1

Korean name
- Hangul: 이동건
- Hanja: 李東健
- RR: I Donggeon
- MR: I Tonggŏn
- Website: Official website

Lee Dong-gun (Korean: 이동건; born 26 July 1980) is a South Korean actor and singer.

== Career ==
Lee Dong-gun made his debut in the entertainment industry in 1998 as a singer, but he would later gain fame as an actor, starring in television dramas such as Sweet 18, Lovers in Paris, and Stained Glass.

Lee took a break from acting in 2005, claiming he felt overwhelmed with his workload in both television and film. He resumed his work in 2006, with Smile Again.

During a fan meeting event in Japan held on 5 December 2005, Lee announced the release of his first photobook which also included a making-of DVD, poster and postcard. The success of Lovers in Paris along with promotions for his new film My Boyfriend Is Type B helped to increase his popularity in Japan.

Lee participated in the Hallyu Expo in Asia on Jeju Island which commenced on 28 November 2006 and spanned a total of 100 days. This large-scale event was intended to promote Korean culture across Asia and expected to bring in 150,000 tourists to stimulate the local economy. He also attended the sequel to the Hallyu Expo which was held in Japan titled FACE in Japan Premium Event. This two-day event from 14 to 15 August 2007, featured Korean celebrities with large fanbases and was intended as a cultural exchange program between Korea and Japan.

Lee released a 14-track album titled My Biography in 2008, his first full-length album in a decade. It included 6 Korean songs, 6 Japanese songs and 2 instrumentals. It was first released in Japan before becoming available in Korea. The same year, he starred in the television series Night After Night alongside Kim Sun-ah, and starred alongside an ensemble cast in the romance film Love Now.

In December 2011, three months prior to the completion of his mandatory military service, Lee signed with talent agency Mask Entertainment. After the termination of his contract with Mask Entertainment, Lee signed with FNC Entertainment in November 2012.

In 2013, Lee was cast in the lead role for the time-travel romance Marry Him If You Dare. This was followed in 2015 by the titular role in cable series Super Daddy Yeol, which was based on the webtoon of the same name. In 2016, Lee starred in the family drama The Gentlemen of Wolgyesu Tailor Shop. He also starred in his first Chinese drama, Hello Mr. Right alongside actress Guan Xiaotong.

In the historical drama Queen for Seven Days, Lee impressed viewers with his a wide range of emotions and acting performance with his role as the tyrannical Joseon ruler Yeonsangun. He then starred in action drama Sketch, playing a member of a special operations command who seeks revenge for the death of his wife; and slice-of-life drama Where Stars Land.

In 2019, Lee was cast in the fantasy romance drama Angel's Last Mission: Love.

== Personal life ==
On 20 March 2008, Lee's 19-year-old brother Lee Joon-yub, a student at the University of Sydney, was fatally stabbed during a brawl with two Chinese teenage gang members at Hungry Jack's in World Square, Sydney. The victim's friend, 22-year-old Song Jung-ho, was critically injured but survived. Lee flew to Sydney to identify his brother's body and attend a requiem mass at the Chapel of St. John's College; after cremation, his family brought back Lee Joon-yub's ashes to Seoul.

=== Military service ===
Lee enlisted for his mandatory military service on 15 June 2010 at the 102 Reserves in Chuncheon, Gangwon Province for four weeks of basic training followed by 21 months of active duty. He served at the Defense Media Agency of the Ministry of National Defense and was appointed Honorary Ambassador of Military. He was discharged on 28 March 2012, and on the same day, he was appointed promotional ambassador for the 2012 Korean Formula One Grand Prix held at the Korea International Circuit in October.

=== Marriage ===
On 28 February 2017, Lee was confirmed to be dating Jo Yoon-hee, his co-star in The Gentlemen of Wolgyesu Tailor Shop. On 2 May, Lee announced that they have registered their marriage and are expecting their first child. The couple held a private wedding ceremony on 29 September and welcomed a baby girl on 14 December 2017. On May 29, 2020, they divorced due to irreconcilable differences.

== Discography ==
=== Albums ===
Title	Album details	Peak chart positions		Sales
Title	Album details	KOR	JPN	Sales
Korean
Time to Fly	Released: 8 November 1998; Label: NULE Entertainment; Format: CD, cassette	—	—	—N/a
Much More	Released: 1 June 2000; Label: NULE Entertainment; Format: CD, cassette	42	—	KOR: 10,853+
Japanese
Beautiful Beginning (美しいはじまり)	Released: 29 April 2005; Label: VAP; Format: CD	—	—	—N/a
My Biography (マイ・バイオグラフィ)	Released: 25 June 2008; Label: Sony Music Japan; Format: CD	—	108	—N/a
The Key to Myself (ザ・キー・トゥ・マイセルフ)	Released: 4 March 2009; Label: Sony Music Japan; Format: CD	—	262	—N/a
"—" denotes album did not chart or was not released in that region.

=== Singles ===
==== As featured artist ====
List of singles, with year, and album
Title	Year	Album
"Salad Song" (Yoon Eun-hye featuring Lee Dong-gun)	2008	Salad Anniversary

== Filmography ==
=== Film ===
Year	Title	Role	Notes	Ref.
2002	Family	Ha Yong-cheol		
2005	My Boyfriend Is Type B	Young-bin		
2007	Love Now	Park Yong-jun		

=== Television series ===
Year	Title	Role	Notes	Ref.
1999	Ad Madness			
2002	Friends	Park Kyung-joo		
2002	Ruler of Your Own World	Han Dong-jin		
2003	Sang Doo! Let's Go to School	Kang Min-suk		
2003	A Problem at My Younger Brother's House	Park Sang-gu		
2004	Sweet 18	Kwon Hyuk-joon		
2004	Lovers in Paris	Yoon Soo-hyuk		
2004	Stained Glass	Han Dong-joo/Yuichi Yamamoto		
2006	Smile Again	Ban Ha-jin		
2006	If in Love... Like Them	Jeong-tae		
2008	Night After Night	Kim Bum-sang		
2008	Star's Lover	Hyun-joon	Cameo	
2013	Marry Him If You Dare	Kim Shin		
2015	Super Daddy Yeol	Han Yul		
2016	The Gentlemen of Wolgyesu Tailor Shop	Lee Dong-jin		
2017	Queen for Seven Days	Yeonsangun		
2018	Sketch	Kim Do-jin		
2018	Where Stars Land	Seo In-woo		
2019	Angel's Last Mission: Love	Ji Kang-woo		
2019	Leverage	Lee Tae-joon		

=== Web series ===
Year	Title	Role	Notes	Ref.
2016	Hello Mr. Right	Zhou Yuteng	Chinese drama	
2022	Kiss Sixth Sense	Hong Sung-joon	Cameo (Ep. 1, 10–12)	
2023	Celebrity	Jin Tae-jeon		

=== Television shows ===
Year	Title	Role	Notes	Ref.
2023–present	My Little Old Boy	Cast member		

=== Music video appearances ===
Year	Title	Artist	Ref.
2004	"Tardy Love"	Eun Hyul	
2007	"A Day"	Position	
2007	"Last Farewell"	Big Bang	
2007	"Don't Love Her"	Lee Hyori	
2008	"Salad Song"	Yoon Eun-hye (feat. Lee Dong-gun)	
2009	"Tomorrow"	4Tomorrow	

== Musical theatre ==
- 1998: Wandering Stars (방황하는 별들)

== Awards and nominations ==
Name of the award ceremony, year presented, category, nominee of the award, and the result of the nomination
Award ceremony	Year	Category	Nominee / Work	Result	Ref.
Andre Kim Best Star Awards	2004	Best Star Award	Lee Dong-gun	Won	
APAN Star Awards	2015	Hallyu Star Award	Lee Dong-gun	Won	
Baeksang Arts Awards	2005	Most Popular Actor – Film	My Boyfriend Is Type B	Won	
Baeksang Arts Awards	2009	Most Popular Actor – Television	Night After Night	Nominated	
Dong-a TV Fashion Beauty Awards	2004	Best Dressed	Lee Dong-gun	Won	
Grand Bell Awards	2005	Best New Actor	My Boyfriend Is Type B	Nominated	
Grand Bell Awards	2008	Best New Actor	Love Now	Nominated	
KBS Drama Awards	2004	Excellence Award, Actor	Sweet 18	Nominated	
KBS Drama Awards	2013	Best Couple Award	Lee Dong-gun (with Yoon Eun-hye); Marry Him If You Dare	Nominated	
KBS Drama Awards	2013	Excellence Award, Actor in Miniseries	Marry Him If You Dare	Nominated	
KBS Drama Awards	2016	Excellence Award, Actor in a Serial Drama	The Gentlemen of Wolgyesu Tailor Shop	Won	
KBS Drama Awards	2017	Excellence Award, Actor in a Mid-length Drama	Queen for Seven Days	Won	
Korea Best Dresser Swan Awards	2008	Best Dressed Actor	Lee Dong-gun	Won	
MBC Drama Awards	2008	Excellence Award, Actor	Night After Night	Won	
SBS Drama Awards	2004	Excellence Award, Actor in a Special Planning Drama	Lovers in Paris	Won	
SBS Drama Awards	2004	Top 10 Stars	Lovers in Paris / Stained Glass	Won	
SBS Drama Awards	2004	Top Excellence Award, Actor	Lovers in Paris / Stained Glass	Nominated	
SBS Drama Awards	2018	Excellence Award, Actor in a Monday-Tuesday Drama	Where Stars Land	Nominated	
SBS Entertainment Awards	2023	Hot Issue Award	My Little Old Boy	Won	
SBS Entertainment Awards	2024	Good Partner Award	My Little Old Boy (Note: Received with Kim Jong-kook, Heo Kyung-hwan, and Kim Hee-chul.)	Won	
Seoul Hallyu Festival	2008	Plaque of Appreciation	Lee Dong-gun	Won	
