= Marry Him If You Dare =

2013 South Korean television series

- Promotional poster
- Also known as: Mirae's Choice; Future's Choice; The Future Choice; Choice of the Future
- Hangul: 미래의 선택
- Hanja: 未來의 選擇
- RR: Miraeui seontaek
- MR: Miraeŭi sŏnt'aek
- Genre: Romance; Drama; Time travel
- Written by: Hong Jin-ah
- Directed by: Kwon Kye-hong; Yoo Jong-sun
- Starring: Yoon Eun-hye; Lee Dong-gun; Jung Yong-hwa; Han Chae-ah; Choi Myung-gil
- Country of origin: South Korea
- Original language: Korean
- No. of episodes: 16

Production
- Executive producer: Kim Sung-geun
- Producers: Kim Young-gyun; Park Woo-ram
- Production location: Korea
- Running time: Mondays and Tuesdays at 22:00 (KST)
- Production companies: Annex Telecom; FNC Entertainment

Original release
- Network: Korean Broadcasting System
- Release: 14 October – 3 December 2013

Marry Him If You Dare (Korean: 미래의 선택; RR: Miraeui seontaek), also known as Mirae's Choice or Future's Choice, is a 2013 South Korean television series starring Yoon Eun-hye, Lee Dong-gun, Jung Yong-hwa, Han Chae-ah, and Choi Myung-gil. It aired on KBS2 from October 14 to December 3, 2013 on Mondays and Tuesdays at 22:00 for 16 episodes.

== Plot ==
Set in the world of television broadcasting, Na Mi-rae travels back in time to prevent her 32-year-old self from marrying news anchor Kim Shin, thus sending her past self down a different path and enabling her to pursue the things she really wanted in life.

== Cast ==
=== Main ===
- Yoon Eun-hye as Na Mi-rae

A bright and lovable 32-year-old who spends her days chanting to herself, "I'm okay!" and barely scrapes by in her job as a call center agent. But one day, her future self appears in front of her and changes her life. She begins to pursue her dream of becoming a television writer.

- Lee Dong-gun as Kim Shin

The network's lead news anchor. He can be prickly, but is also highly principled and upright.

- Jung Yong-hwa as Park Se-joo

The CEO's grandson who is set to inherit the network. He went to film school in America, and is masquerading as a lowly cameraman (or VJ). He dreams of building a media conglomerate.

- Han Chae-ah as Seo Yoo-kyung

A reporter on the morning show. Outwardly cute, she is smart and cunning.

- Choi Myung-gil as Na Mi-rae's future self

She came from future to change her present life.

=== Supporting ===
- Oh Jung-se as Noh Joo-hyun
- Lee Mi-do as Bae Hyun-ah
- Lee Jung-hyuk as Seong-hoon
- Ba Ram as Chang Gong
- Ahn Se-ha as Lee Jae-soo
- Go Doo-shim as Lee Mi-ran
- Kim Ji-ho as black man
- Jang Eun-ah as announcer
- Shin Bo-ra as entertainer (cameo)

== Original soundtrack ==
Marry Him If You Dare Original Soundtrack

Soundtrack album by Various Artists
- Released: October 14, 2013
- Genres: Pop, K-pop, soundtrack
- Languages: Korean, English
- Label: FNC Entertainment

Playlist 1
No.	Title	Artist	Length
1.	"My Lady"	Kim Tae-woo	3:42

Playlist 2
No.	Title	Artist	Length
1.	"I'm OK"	Yuna	3:11
2.	"사랑을 캐스팅해요" (Casting Love)	Jeon Gun-hwa	3:20

Playlist 3
No.	Title	Artist	Length
1.	"Only Me"	Melody Day	3:35
2.	"Paradise"	Cyndi	3:53

Playlist 4
No.	Title	Artist	Length
1.	"It's You"	Park Hyo-shin	3:51

== Ratings ==
Episode #	Original broadcast date	Average audience share			
Episode #	Original broadcast date	TNmS Ratings		AGB Nielsen	
Episode #	Original broadcast date	Nationwide	Seoul National Capital Area	Nationwide	Seoul National Capital Area
1	14 October 2013	8.4%	9.5%	9.7%	9.9%
2	15 October 2013	7.9%	9.0%	8.6%	9.2%
3	21 October 2013	7.2%	7.6%	8.5%	9.0%
4	22 October 2013	5.9%	6.5%	7.3%	7.7%
5	28 October 2013	5.8%	6.2%	6.5%	7.3%
6	29 October 2013	6.7%	7.2%	7.4%	7.9%
7	4 November 2013	5.5%	6.1%	6.5%	7.3%
8	5 November 2013	4.7%	5.4%	5.4%	6.3%
9	11 November 2013	4.6%	5.0%	5.9%	6.9%
10	12 November 2013	5.1%	5.5%	5.4%	6.3%
11	18 November 2013	4.0%	4.8%	5.0%	5.3%
12	19 November 2013	4.2%	4.8%	4.7%	5.5%
13	25 November 2013	3.2%	3.5%	4.5%	4.8%
14	26 November 2013	3.8%	4.3%	4.3%	4.8%
15	2 December 2013	3.5%	4.1%	4.7%	5.7%
16	3 December 2013	3.6%	4.0%	4.1%	5.0%
Average		5.3%	-	6.2%	-

== Awards and nominations ==
Year	Award	Category	Recipient	Result
2013	KBS Drama Awards	Excellence Award, Actor in a Miniseries	Lee Dong-gun	Nominated
2013	KBS Drama Awards	Excellence Award, Actress in a Miniseries	Yoon Eun-hye	Nominated
2013	KBS Drama Awards	Best Couple Award	Lee Dong-gun & Yoon Eun-hye	Nominated
2013	KBS Drama Awards	Best Couple Award	Jung Yong-hwa & Han Chae-ah	Nominated
2014	50th Baeksang Arts Awards	Most Popular Actor (TV)	Jung Yong-hwa	Nominated
2014	50th Baeksang Arts Awards	Most Popular Actress (TV)	Yoon Eun-hye	Nominated
2014	9th Seoul International Drama Awards	Outstanding Korean Drama OST	My Lady - Kim Tae-woo	Nominated
2014	9th Seoul International Drama Awards	Outstanding Korean Drama OST	It's You - Park Hyo-shin	Nominated
2014	9th Seoul International Drama Awards	Outstanding Korean Actor	Jung Yong-hwa	Nominated
2014	9th Seoul International Drama Awards	Outstanding Korean Drama	Marry Him If You Dare	Nominated
