= Super Daddy Yeol =

2015 South Korean drama series

- Promotional poster
- Also known as: Super Daddy Yul
- Hangul: 슈퍼대디 열
- RR: Syupeo daedi Yeol
- MR: Syup'ŏ taedi Yŏl
- Genre: Family; Comedy; Romance
- Based on: Super Daddy Yeol by Lee Sang-hoon and Jin Hyo-mi
- Written by: Kim Kyung-se
- Directed by: Song Hyun-wook; Lee Jong-jae
- Starring: Lee Dong-gun; Lee Yu-ri; Lee Re
- Composers: Eom Gi-yeop; Lee Im-woo
- Country of origin: South Korea
- Original language: Korean
- No. of episodes: 16

Production
- Executive producers: Lee Chan-ho; Choi Kyung-sook
- Producers: Choi Jin-hee; Park Ji-young; Shin Dae-shik; Jang Jung-do; Lee Esther; Ham Seung-hoon
- Production location: South Korea
- Cinematography: Han Dong-hyeon; Jang Deok-hwan
- Editor: Kang Yoon-hee
- Running time: 65 minutes Fridays and Saturdays at 20:30 (KST)
- Production company: tvN

Original release
- Network: tvN
- Release: March 13 – May 2, 2015

Super Daddy Yeol (Korean: 슈퍼대디 열) is a 2015 South Korean television series starring Lee Dong-gun, Lee Yu-ri and Lee Re. Based on the same-titled Daum webtoon by Lee Sang-hoon and Jin Hyo-mi, it aired on tvN from March 13 to May 2, 2015, on Fridays and Saturdays at 20:30 for 16 episodes.

== Plot ==
Cha Mi-rae is a doctor and single mother to her young daughter Sa-rang. When she gets diagnosed with terminal cancer and told she has one year left to live, she seeks out her ex-boyfriend Han Yeol, a former baseball player. Mi-rae and Yeol were a couple a decade ago, but she broke up with him to study abroad and because she didn't think much of his prospects. Soon after, a serious injury forced him to retire from the sport, and Yeol became the rehabilitation coach of a major league baseball team. Mi-rae is determined to transform still-single, grungy, irritable Yeol into the best father possible for her daughter.

== Cast ==
- Lee Dong-gun as Han Yeol
- Lee Yu-ri as Cha Mi-rae
- Lee Re as Cha Sa-rang
- Seo Jun-young as Shin Woo-hyuk
- Seo Yea-ji as Hwang Ji-hye
- Kang Nam-gil as Han Man-ho
- Kim Mi-kyung as Hwang Ji-woo
- Lee Han-wi as Choi Nak-kwon
- Jang Gwang as Coach Bang
- Choi Min as Ryu Hyun-woo
- Park Joo-hyung as Uhm Ki-tae
- Choi Dae-chul as Shiksanghae (Shim Sang-hae)
- Jung Ji-ah as Jang Shi-eun
- Choi Kwon-soo as Lee Min-woo
- Lee Young-eun as Uhm Bo-mi
- Oh Joo-eun as Chae Yu-ra
- Kim Hye-na as Min Mang-hae
- Han Young as Teacher
- Han Groo as Laura Jang (cameo, episodes 8–9)
