= Missing You (South Korean TV series) =

South Korean TV series

- Promotional poster
- Also known as: I Miss You
- Hangul: 보고싶다
- RR: Bogosipda
- MR: Pogosipta
- Genre: Romance; Melodrama; Crime; Mystery; Thriller; Suspense; Action
- Written by: Moon Hee-jung
- Directed by: Lee Jae-dong; Park Jae-beom
- Starring: Park Yoo-chun; Yoon Eun-hye; Yoo Seung-ho
- Music by: Jo Yoon-jung; Lee Im-woo
- Country of origin: South Korea
- Original language: Korean
- No. of episodes: 21

Production
- Cinematography: Jung Seung-woo; Kim Seon-cheol
- Running time: 60 minutes
- Production company: Victory Production

Original release
- Network: Munhwa Broadcasting Corporation
- Release: November 7, 2012 – January 17, 2013

Missing You (Korean: 보고싶다; RR: Bogosipda; also known as I Miss You) is a 2012 South Korean television series starring Park Yoo-chun, Yoon Eun-hye, and Yoo Seung-ho. It aired on MBC from November 7, 2012, to January 17, 2013, on Wednesdays and Thursdays at 21:55 for 21 episodes.

Middle school sweethearts Jung-woo and Soo-yeon were separated in a horrifying tragedy that continues to weigh down on them as adults. Now a guilt-ridden detective, Jung-woo has been desperately searching for Soo-yeon for years, but when he crosses paths with her again, she has already become someone else with a new identity.

The show's depiction of the rape of the teenage female protagonist (albeit off screen) caused controversy among viewers and netizens.

== Synopsis ==
Fifteen year old Lee Soo-yeon (Kim So-hyun) is a victim of bullying at school, targeted because her father Lee Tae-soo was a murderer, who was also sentenced to death and subsequently hanged (It was later revealed that her father was in fact falsely accused of the crime he was convicted of and executed for). Through a series of fated events, she meets Han Jung-woo (Yeo Jin-goo), the son of a chaebol and gangster. Jung-woo protects Soo-yeon from the bullies, they become friends and soon fall in love. One day, Jung-woo was kidnapped and Soo-yeon, who witnessed the abduction, attempts to help - only to be taken by the kidnappers as well.

Kang Hyung-joon (Ahn Do-gyu)'s mother, the mistress of Jung-woo's grandfather, and Jung-woo's father have been fighting over a large sum of money. She finally succeeds in moving the money to a Swiss bank with the help of her nurse, Jun Hye-mi. Wanting to leave Korea safely with Hyung-joon as soon as possible, Hye-mi was ordered to have Jung-woo kidnapped until they can flee out of the country. Due to an unexpected accident during the time when Jung-woo and Soo-yeon were both kidnapped, they became separated. Jung-woo was rescued from the kidnappers by his father, but he was unable to return to help Soo-yeon, who was presumed to be dead. Jung-woo's father, wanting to cover up the incident, bribes the kidnappers and the police to fake Soo-yeon's death. Hyung-joon, however, had saved Soo-yeon's life and killed a detective that was chasing after them. Soo-yeon then fled out of the country with Hyung-joon and Hye-mi.

Fourteen years later, Jung-woo (now Park Yoochun) is now a homicide detective and has set his mind on finding Soo-yeon, believing that she is not dead. Soo-yeon (now Yoon Eun-hye) is now known as Zoey Lou, a rookie fashion designer who appears to have a bright personality, but she still carries the emotional scars of her past inside her. Fate leads to the meeting of the two, but Zoey is unforgiving towards Jung-woo for abandoning her during the kidnapping. But however, she slowly began to forgive him after he tried to protect her at all times. Meanwhile, Kang Hyung-joon (Yoo Seung-ho), rich with the money his mother took from the Han family, returns to Korea for revenge. He appears warm and nice, but turns out to be a psychopathic murderer and uses the alias Harry Borrison to get his revenge on Jung-woo's father for murdering his mother.

== Cast ==
=== Main ===
- Park Yoo-chun as Han Jung-woo
  - Yeo Jin-goo as young Jung-woo

Han Jung-woo is born into a wealthy family and is the son of Han Tae-joon. He has a stepmother who doesn't care for him and remained in the United States, supposedly in exile. On return, he comes across Lee Soo-yeon and befriends her. When they met again later at school, he is her only friend. They soon develop feelings for each other and agree to meet on a rainy day. On that day, however, he is kidnapped, and Soo-yeon, witnessing this, jumps in to save him. Unfortunately, they are separated during this as Jung-woo's father, who manages to save him, refuses to go back for Soo-yeon. Jung-woo persistently looks out for her, but it is in vain. Fourteen years later, Jung-woo, who now is a detective, stumbles upon Zoey Lou, who is remarkably similar to Soo-yeon. He decides to stay close to her as he is convinced that she is Soo-yeon. He crosses paths with Harry Borrison who is Zoey's current boyfriend. As a detective, he is quick to find out that his father had faked Soo-yeon's death. He also discovers that Harry is indeed his uncle and is now a murderer who is after him and his family. He tries to protect Soo-yeon from everyone, and even when Hyung-joon frames Soo-yeon for the murders he committed, Jung-woo firmly believes in her innocence and had her evading arrest by going against his own colleagues. In the end, he earns back Soo-yeon's love and marries her.

- Yoon Eun-hye as Lee Soo-yeon / Zoey Lou
  - Kim So-hyun as young Soo-yeon

Lee Soo-yeon is a poor girl who has an abusive father. Her father Lee Tae-soo turns out to be a murderer, and people despise and bully her because of this. It was later revealed that her father was innocent, but it was too late since her father was already given the death sentence and was executed. When she meets Han Jung-woo, she is surprised and smitten by how he wants to be her friend. She quickly develops feelings for him because of this. When she sees him get kidnapped on the day they were supposed to meet, she tries to save him. Unfortunately, she gets raped and separated from him. Jung-woo's father fakes her death even though she was rescued by Kang Hyung-joon, a boy she saved from a fire earlier. She runs away with him and his 'aunt' abroad. Fourteen years later, living under the name of Zoey Lou, she is now a popular rising designer who returns to Korea. Upon meeting Jung-woo again by chance, she recognizes him but pretends she isn't Lee Soo-yeon. She had held a grudge against him for leaving her at the kidnapping scene rather than saving her. As Jung-woo, however, consistently tries to protect and reach out to her, her anger fades gradually and admits her true self to him. Because of this, her current boyfriend, Harry Borrison (who is Kang Hyung-joon) gets angry at her for going back to Jung-woo. He makes her life miserable by depicting her as the accused for all his crimes. Through all this, she reconciles with her family and in the end marries Jung-woo.

- Yoo Seung-ho as Kang Hyung-joon / Harry Borrison / Han Hyung-joon
  - Ahn Do-gyu as young Hyung-joon

Kang Hyung-joon is the son of Kang Hyun-joo who was put in a mental hospital by Han Tae Joon. Hyung-joon was then chased out by him and bitten by his dog, crippling his leg for life, leading him to require a cane to walk throughout his later life and adulthood. He goes into hiding with his mother's trusted nurse. When a fire starts in his house, Lee Soo-yeon, helped by Han Jung-woo, rescues him. He feels indebted to Soo-yeon and rescues her after she gets separated from Jung-woo. They escape abroad and lived under aliases. Over the years, he falls in love with Soo-yeon and becomes her boyfriend. He returns to Korea with her, under the name of Harry Borrison. He is not in good terms with Han Jung-woo as he is Han Tae-Joon's son, and that he is earning Soo-yeon's love again. Hyung-joon is secretly a psychopathic murderer driven by revenge for Han Tae-joon. When he sees Soo-yeon going back to Jung-woo, he frames her for his murders and makes her life difficult. He genuinely loves her and says that this is her "punishment" for not loving him back. He also kidnapped Soo-yeon and was confronted by Jung-woo. In the end, Hyung-joon was arrested, convicted of all the murders he committed and sentenced to life imprisonment. He also lost his memories (except for those he spent with Soo-yeon) and his intelligence reverted to that of a five-year-old child as a result of huge blood loss from a gunshot wound.

=== Supporting ===
- Jang Mi-inae as Kim Eun-joo
  - Yoo Yeon-mi as young Kim Eun-joo

Kim Eun-joo is a manhwa artist and Kim Sung-ho's daughter. Her family is close with Soo-yeon's and takes them in when they needed a new home. At first, she has a crush on Jung-woo but did not develop more serious feelings. She is devastated when her father dies while chasing Soo-yeon. She claims to hate Soo-yeon if she ever returns home after she got kidnapped. She pretends to be cold even though she is relieved that Soo-yeon is home safely.

- Han Jin-hee as Han Tae-joon

Han Tae-joon is Han Jung-woo's father. Unlike his good-natured son, he has a callous, selfish, cruel and oppressive personality. He is also driven by money and reputation. He put Kang Hyun-joo in a mental hospital and cripples her son, Kang Hyung-joon. Hyung-joon despises him and plots revenge against him. When Jung-woo was kidnapped, Tae-joon only saved his son even though he promised to go back for Soo-yeon. Instead, he burns all the remaining traces of Soo-yeon and allies with the police to fake her death, showing no remorse for this incident. He is hated by Jung-woo for this, which led to Jung-woo severing ties with him and running away from home for over 14 years. He went on to commit more crimes throughout the series, including abetting Hyung-joon to kidnap Soo-yeon. In the end, he was arrested and later imprisoned for all the heinous crimes he committed.

- Song Ok-sook as Kim Myung-hee

Soo-yeon's mother, and Eun-joo's adoptive mother. She was also ostracised like her daughter over her husband's crime, and was later taken in by Kim Sung-ho, a police officer who treats them kindly. She was devastated till today over her daughter's supposed death and spent the next 14 years raising both Eun-joo and Jung-woo, the latter who runs away from his father's home.

- Do Ji-won as Hwang Mi-ran

Han Jung-woo's stepmother, and Han Tae-joon's second wife. She is Ah-reum's mother. She has a poor relationship with her stepson Jung-woo, who was not related to her by blood. She was a fan of Zoey, whose real identity is Lee Soo-yeon. Nearing the end of the series, her relationship with Jung-woo slowly improves.

- Lee Se-young as Han Ah-reum
  - Jeon Min-seo as young Han Ah-reum

Han Jung-woo's bright and good-natured younger half-sister. She was the only member of the Han family whom Jung-woo favours and trusts, and still maintains in contact with even after he severed ties with his father.

- Oh Jung-se as Joo Jung-myung

A trusted senior of Jung-woo who was close to him and also helped him in searching for Soo-yeon.

- Jun Kwang-ryul as Kim Sung-ho

A police officer and Eun-joo's father. He was kind to Soo-yeon and her mother and took them in to live with him and Eun-joo. He also treats the girl as his daughter even though he himself was the one who arrested her father Lee Tae-soo for murder. It was later found out that Tae-soo was actually innocent and the real killer was apprehended before Tae-soo's execution, which led to Sung-ho feeling guilty for catching the wrong person and indirectly causing much suffering to Tae-soo's family. After Soo-yeon's presumed death, Sung-ho, like Jung-woo, believes that Soo-yeon was still alive and tried his best to find her. Feeling frustrated with the other officers' incompetence and their involvement in faking Soo-yeon's death, he angrily resigns and went on to look for Soo-yeon himself. Just when Sung-ho discovered Soo-yeon is alive, he was killed in a car accident due to Hyung-joon causing damage to his car earlier, making him the first of Hyung-joon's many victims during his growth as a serial killer.

- Kim Sun-kyung as Jung Hye-mi/Michelle Kim

A nurse who knew Kang Hyun-joo. She decided to help Hyun-joo to hide the money and bring Hyun-joo's son Hyung-joon out of Korea, while facilitating Jung-woo's kidnapping. She seem to hate Soo-yeon for coming along with them and sees her as a hindrance to their escape plans, and was mentioned to have mistreated Soo-yeon throughout the time they were together. She later changed her name to Michelle Kim, and later drowned to death in a swimming pool at Hyung-joon's home. She was actually killed by Hyung-joon due to him hating her for abusing Soo-yeon, whom he grew to love over the next 14 years he spent with her.

- Cha Hwa-yeon as Kang Hyun-joo

Hyung-joon's mother who was the nurse of Hae Tae-joon's bed-ridden father, with whom she had an affair with and thus led to her giving birth to Hyung-joon. She was illegally confined in a mental hospital by Tae-joon upon the death of Tae-joon's father and was presumed to be killed by Tae-joon, leading to Hyung-joon feeling hatred towards Tae-joon for.

- Jung Suk-yong as police station lieutenant

A police officer who took Jung-woo in when he runs away from his father's home. He sympathised with Jung-woo and helped him to find the missing Soo-yeon, and even became Jung-woo's mentor and superior when Jung-woo joined the police force and worked at his station. He was Kim Sung-ho's junior before Sung-ho's resignation and death.

- Kim Mi-kyung as Song Mi-jung

A cleaner working at a police station. She and Jung-woo have a close relationship together. She had a daughter Bo-ra, who was killed by Sang-deuk (Jung-woo and Soo-yeon's kidnapper), which led to her going after Sang-deuk out of revenge upon the man's release, causing her to be accused of Sang-deuk's murder initially before it became apparent that Hyung-joon was Sang-deuk's true murderer.

- Jo Deok-hyun as Secretary Nam

Han Tae-joon's secretary who was also responsible for faking Soo-yeon's death.

- Park Sun-woo as Kang Sang-deuk

One of the two kidnappers who abducted Soo-yeon and Jung-woo, and he was the one who raped Soo-yeon. It was mentioned he has a previous conviction for rape prior to Jung-woo and Soo-yeon's kidnapping incident. Upon being caught, he falsely confessed that Soo-yeon is dead due to Han Tae-joon bribing him to say so, and subsequently, for rape, murder and kidnapping, Sang-deuk spent the next 14 years in prison before being released. He showed no remorse throughout all these years for the kidnappings, as well as the disappearance and rape of Soo-yeon, and constantly taunts Jung-woo for Soo-yeon whenever they met, whether in or out of jail. Shortly after his release, he was found murdered in his home, and his killer was revealed to be Hyung-joon, who thirsted for revenge on behalf of Soo-yeon's rape incident. He has a brother Sang-chul who was also involved in the kidnapping.

- Uhm Choon-bae as Kang Sang-chul

Kang Sang-deuk's brother who was also involved in the kidnapping of Soo-yeon and Jung-woo, and was also bribed by Han Tae-joon to fake Soo-yeon's death. Like Sang-deuk (who was sentenced to 14 years' imprisonment for rape, murder and kidnapping), Sang-chul was not remorseful of his heinous actions even after 14 years since Soo-yeon's disappearance. He blamed Jung-woo for Sang-deuk's death even though he was not the killer. He was later murdered by Harry Borrison (Kang Hyung-joon) and his body was deliberately thrown from the rooftop of a mental hospital down to the nearest place where Jung-woo is standing, with Jung-woo's family photo from 14 years before tucked inside his coat.

- Song Jae-ho as Choi Chang-shik

An acquaintance of policeman Kim Sung-ho, who later assists Jung-woo to investigate and arrest Harry Borrison (Kang Hyung-joon).

=== Extended cast ===
- Yang young-jo as Lee Tae-soo (cameo, ep 1)

Lee Soo-yeon's abusive father, and Kim Myung-hee's husband. He was convicted of murder and sentenced to death, and subsequently hanged on an unspecified date (latest by 1997 since South Korea did not execute a single prisoner from 1998 onwards). Tae-soo's fate was mentioned by Kim Sung-ho during his conversation with the teenage Jung-woo while they tried to search for the missing Soo-yeon. His crime had led to both Soo-yeon and Myung-hee being ostracised by most of the people known to them and strangers. It was however, later revealed that Tae-soo was wrongfully convicted of murder and was innocent (the real killer was caught sometime before Tae-soo's hanging), but it was too late as Tae-soo was already being put to death in the gallows.

- Chun Jae-ho as Assistant Yoon Young-jae

Han Tae-joon's assistant. He was actually the spy sent by Kang Hyung-joon to keep watch on Tae-joon. His real name is Moon Hae-joon, alias Harry Borrison, and was adopted from Korea by a French couple (the Borrison family), and having suffered parental abuse, he was grateful to Hyung-joon for helping him kill his abusive foster parents. He lent Hyung-joon his French name Harry Borrison to allow him to initiate his revenge plan against Han Tae-joon. The murders of Yoon's forster parents remained unsolved until Hyung-joon was investigated to be involved in them during the investigations conducted by the police to catch him.

=== Others ===
- Cho Yoon-woo as Karaoke receptionist
- Fabien Yoon as Harry's lawyer
- Kim Sae-ron as Choi Bo-ra, Song Mi-jung's deceased daughter, who was implied to be raped and killed by Kang Sang-deuk (voice cameo, ep 11)

== Production ==
The series was written by Moon Hee-jung, who previously wrote Last Scandal and Listen to My Heart. Director Lee Jae-dong previously helmed Can't Lose and Thank You.

Teenage actors Yeo Jin-goo and Kim So-hyun were first cast as the younger versions of the leading characters, and they appeared in the first four episodes. They previously played Crown Prince Lee Hwon and Lady Yoon Bo-kyung, respectively, in MBC drama Moon Embracing the Sun. In September 2012, Park Yoochun officially signed on as the male lead, and in October, Yoon Eun-hye was cast in the female lead role; this is her first melodrama.

Episode 13, originally scheduled for broadcast on December 19, 2012, was preempted by election special Decision 2012. It aired on Thursday, December 20 instead, resulting in only one episode for that week. The series was extended by one episode and ended on January 17, 2013, concluding with 21 episodes.

== Ratings ==
- In the table below, the blue numbers represent the lowest ratings and the red numbers represent the highest ratings.
- According to AGB Nielsen Media Research, the first two episodes achieved a nationwide rating of 7.7 and 6.2 percent respectively. Both of which ranked third behind rivals The Innocent Man on KBS and The Great Seer on SBS.

Ep.	Original broadcast date	Average audience share			
Ep.	Original broadcast date	TNmS		AGB Nielsen	
Ep.	Original broadcast date	Nationwide	Seoul	Nationwide	Seoul
1	November 7, 2012	7.7%	8.4%	8.7%	9.0%
2	November 8, 2012	7.9%	7.7%	8.2%	9.2%
3	November 14, 2012	8.0%	10.0%	8.6%	7.6%
4	November 15, 2012	8.4%	9.9%	7.0%	9.5%
5	November 21, 2012	10.3%	12.1%	10.2%	11.2%
6	November 22, 2012	11.9%	14.0%	11.0%	12.7%
7	November 28, 2012	12.5%	15.0%	10.6%	11.9%
8	November 29, 2012	12.1%	14.2%	10.1%	11.8%
9	December 5, 2012	10.7%	12.5%	11.0%	12.5%
10	December 6, 2012	12.9%	15.3%	11.5%	12.7%
11	December 12, 2012	14.2%	17.4%	11.7%	13.3%
12	December 13, 2012	13.9%	17.9%	11.6%	13.8%
13	December 20, 2012	11.9%	15.1%	9.7%	10.8%
14	December 26, 2012	12.2%	15.2%	10.5%	11.8%
15	December 27, 2012	10.9%	13.8%	11.2%	12.8%
16	January 2, 2013	11.1%	12.9%	10.9%	12.4%
17	January 3, 2013	12.2%	15.0%	10.8%	12.2%
18	January 9, 2013	11.8%	14.0%	10.2%	11.9%
19	January 10, 2013	12.9%	15.4%	10.9%	12.8%
20	January 16, 2013	12.3%	15.4%	10.6%	11.7%
21	January 17, 2013	11.8%	14.4%	11.6%	13.2%
Average		11.3%	13.7%	10.0%	11.5%

== Soundtrack ==
1. 떨어진다 눈물이 (The Teardrops Are Falling) – Wax
2. 바라보나봐 (Just Look At You) – Chung Dong-ha of Boohwal
3. 니 얼굴 떠올라 (Reminds of You) – Byul (feat. Swings)
4. 사랑하면 안돼요 (Don't Love Me) – Lee Seok-hoon of SG Wannabe
5. 마법의 성 (Magic Castle) – Melody Day
6. 슬픔 (Sorrow)
7. 외로움 (Loneliness)
8. 절망 (Despair)
9. 두려움 (Awe)
10. 기다림 (Waiting)
11. 보고싶다 (I Miss You)
12. Decisive (Inst.)
13. 마법의 성 (Magic Castle) (Inst.)
14. 사랑하면 안돼요 (Don't Love Me) (Inst.)
15. 니 얼굴 떠올라 (Reminds of You) (Inst.)
16. 바라보나봐 (Just Look At You) (Inst.)
17. 떨어진다 눈물이 (The Teardrops Are Falling) (Inst.)
18. The Wind is Blowing (Inst.)

== Awards ==
2012 K-Drama Star Awards

- Best Young Actress - Kim So-hyun

2012 MBC Drama Awards

- Excellence Award, Actor in a Miniseries - Park Yoochun
- Best Young Actor - Yeo Jin-goo
- Best Young Actress - Kim So-hyun
- Golden Acting Award, Actor - Jun Kwang-ryul
- Popularity Award - Yoon Eun-hye
- Hallyu Star Award - Yoon Eun-hye

2013 Baeksang Arts Awards

- Most Popular Actor (TV) - Park Yoochun
