= Moon Hee-jung =

South Korean television screenwriter

- Born: South Korea
- Occupation: Screenwriter
- Years active: 2005–present

Korean name
- Hangul: 문희정
- Hanja: 文熙貞
- RR: Mun Huijeong
- MR: Mun Hŭijŏng

Moon Hee-jung is a South Korean television screenwriter. She is best known for writing the dramas Last Scandal, Smile, You, Listen to My Heart, and Missing You.

== Filmography ==
=== Television series ===
Television drama(s) written by Moon
Year	Title		Network	Ref.
Year	English	Korean	Network	Ref.
2001	Great Friends Season 2		KBS2	
2005	Summer Beach	해변으로 가요	SBS TV	
2006	Tree of Heaven	천국의 나무	SBS TV	
2008	Last Scandal	내 생애 마지막 스캔들	MBC	
2009	Smile, You	그대, 웃어요	SBS TV	
2012–2013	Missing You	보고싶다	MBC	
2011	Listen to My Heart	내 마음이 들리니?	MBC	
2014	Glorious Day	기분 좋은날	SBS TV	
2016	Goodbye Mr. Black		MBC	

== Accolades ==
=== Awards and nominations ===
Award	Year	Category	Recipient	Result
MBC Drama Awards	2008	Viewer's Favorite Drama of the Year	Last Scandal	Nominated
45th Baeksang Arts Awards	2009	Best Drama	Last Scandal	Nominated
45th Baeksang Arts Awards	2009	Best Screenplay (TV)	Last Scandal	Nominated

=== State honors ===
Name of country, year given, and name of honor
Country	Award Ceremony	Year	Honor	Ref.
South Korea	3rd Korean Content Awards (Note: Honors are given at the Korean Content Awards (대한민국 콘텐츠 대상) arranged by the Korea Creative Content Agency and hosted by the Ministry of Culture, Sports and Tourism. The Korea Content Awards Ceremony, which started in 2009, aims to inspire pride in the content industry and develop the Korean cultural content industry by discovering and awarding contributors and excellent content that have contributed to the development of the content industry in 2022. It is a place to promote. The winners (works) of honor, which are recommended through the website of the Korea Creative Content Agency (www.kocca.kr) and announced through careful examination by experts and three-step verification, play a leading role in shining the Korean content industry in the world.)	2011	Minister of Culture, Sports and Tourism Citation Excellence Award in the Field of Broadcasting for Listen to My Heart	
