= 2008 MBC Drama Awards =

27th edition of award ceremony

- Date: December 30, 2008
- Hosted by: Shin Dong-yup; Han Ji-hye

Highlights
- Grand Prize (Daesang): Kim Myung-min; Song Seung-heon

Television coverage
- Network: MBC

The 2008 MBC Drama Awards (Korean: MBC 연기대상) is a ceremony honoring the outstanding achievement in television on the Munhwa Broadcasting Corporation (MBC) network for the year of 2008. It was held on December 30, 2008 and hosted by Shin Dong-yup and actress Han Ji-hye.

== Nominations and winners ==
(Winners denoted in bold)

Grand Prize (Daesang)	Achievement Award
**Kim Myung-min** – **Beethoven Virus**; **Song Seung-heon** – **East of Eden**	**Choi Jin-sil** – **Last Scandal**
Top Excellence Award, Actor	Top Excellence Award, Actress
**Cho Jae-hyun** – **New Heart**; **Jung Joon-ho** – **Last Scandal**; Kim Myung-min – Beethoven Virus; Song Seung-heon – East of Eden	**Bae Jong-ok** – **Woman of Matchless Beauty, Park Jung-geum**; **Lee Mi-sook** – **East of Eden**; Choi Jin-sil – Last Scandal; Kim Sun-a – Night After Night
Excellence Award, Actor	Excellence Award, Actress
**Jo Min-ki** – **East of Eden**; **Lee Dong-gun** – **Night After Night**; Cha Tae-hyun – General Hospital 2; Ji Sung – New Heart	**Han Ji-hye** – **East of Eden**; **Moon So-ri** – **My Life's Golden Age**; Lee Da-hae – East of Eden; Lee Ji-ah – Beethoven Virus
Golden Acting Award, Actor in a Miniseries	Golden Acting Award, Actress in a Miniseries
**Ji Sung** – **New Heart**	**Kim Min-jung** – **New Heart**
Golden Acting Award, Actor in a Serial Drama	Golden Acting Award, Actress in a Serial Drama
**Park Geun-hyung** – **Woman of Matchless Beauty, Park Jung-geum**, **East of Eden**	**Hong Eun-hee** – **Don't Be Swayed**
Golden Acting Award, Supporting Actor	Golden Acting Award, Supporting Actress
**Park Chul-min** – **New Heart**, **Beethoven Virus**	**Shin Eun-jung** – **East of Eden**
Golden Acting Award, Veteran Actor	Golden Acting Award, Veteran Actress
**Yoo Dong-geun** – **East of Eden**	**Song Ok-sook** – **Beethoven Virus**
Best New Actor	Best New Actress
**Park Hae-jin** – **East of Eden**; **Jang Keun-suk** – **Beethoven Virus**; Shin Sung-rok – My Life's Golden Age; Yoon Sang-hyun – The Secret of Coocoo Island	**Lee So-yeon** – **My Life's Golden Age**; **Lee Yeon-hee** – **East of Eden**; Go Ara – Who Are You?; Hyun Jyu-ni – Beethoven Virus
Best Young Actor	Best Young Actress
**Park Gun-tae** – **East of Eden**; **Shin Dong-woo** – **East of Eden**	**Nam Ji-hyun** – **East of Eden**
PD Award	Writer of the Year
**Lee Soon-jae** – **Beethoven Virus**; **Yeon Jung-hoon** – **East of Eden**	**Hong Jin-ah, Hong Ja-ram** – **Beethoven Virus**; **Kim Eun-hee** – **MBC Special**; **Na Yeon-sook** – **East of Eden**
Popularity Award, Actor	Popularity Award, Actress
**Song Seung-heon** – **East of Eden**; Cha Tae-hyun – General Hospital 2; Jang Keun-suk – Beethoven Virus; Ji Sung – New Heart; Kim Myung-min – Beethoven Virus; Lee Dong-gun – Night After Night	**Lee Yeon-hee** – **East of Eden**; Kim Jung-eun – General Hospital 2; Kim Min-jung – New Heart; Kim Sun-a – Night After Night; Lee Ji-ah – Beethoven Virus; Son Ye-jin – Spotlight
Best Couple Award	Viewer's Favorite Drama of the Year
**Song Seung-heon** and **Lee Yeon-hee** – **East of Eden**; Choi Jin-sil and Jung Joon-ho – Last Scandal; Ji Sung and Kim Min-jung – New Heart; Kim Myung-min and Lee Ji-ah – Beethoven Virus; Kim Sun-a and Lee Dong-gun – Night After Night; Oh Yeon-soo and Lee Dong-wook – La Dolce Vita	**Beethoven Virus**; East of Eden; Last Scandal; New Heart
Family Award	Best TV Voice Actor/Actress
**I Love You, Don't Cry**	**Choi Yoon-young** – **CSI: Crime Scene Investigation**; **Kim Ho-seong** – **CSI: Miami**
Special Award in TV, Director	Special Award in TV, Announcer
**Lee Jae-kyoo** – **Beethoven Virus**	**Lee Jae-yong**
Top Excellence Award in Radio	Excellence Award in Radio
**Lee Moon-se** – **This Is Lee Moon-se in the Morning**	**Kangin** – **Kangin's Good Friends**; **Kang Seok-woo** – **Women's Era**
Best Newcomer in Radio	Best Writer in Radio
**Kim Shin-young** – **ShimShimTapa**	**Kim Shin-wook** – **언중유쾌**
Special Award in Radio	Special Award in Radio, Voice Actor
**Yoo Jin** – **세계는 그리고 우리는**	**Kim Kang-san** – **Turbulent Fifties**
