= The Influence (2010 film) =

- South Korean poster
- Directed by: Lee Jae-kyoo
- Written by: Hong Jin-ah
- Produced by: Won Dong-yeon; Kim Ho-sung
- Starring: Lee Byung-hun; Han Chae-young
- Cinematography: Kim Ji-yong
- Music by: Mowg
- Production company: Realies Pictures
- Distributed by: CJ Entertainment
- Release date: August 19, 2010
- Running time: 60 minutes
- Country: South Korea
- Language: Korean

The Influence (Korean: 인플루언스) is a four-part online film directed by Lee Jae-kyoo and starring Lee Byung-hun and Han Chae-young. The movie, which delves into the realms of mystery and fantasy, takes place over the time period 1907–2010.

== Plot ==
A beautiful woman J, who has been trapped inside a massive water tank to be with W, invites TV anchorman Kim Woo-kyung and auctioneer Choi Dong-hoon to make a choice. One day, W is chased by a mysterious man and the hidden secret behind why W and J look at each other through a glass boundary of 100 years in time is slowly revealed.

== Cast ==
- Lee Byung-hun as W/White W
- Han Chae-young as J
- Cho Jae-hyun as Gojong
- Jeon No-min as Kim Woo-kyung, TV anchorman
- Lee Je-hoon as Sunjong
- Park Byung-eun as odd-eye
- Kim Tae-woo as Choi Dong-hoon, Korean branch manager of auction company
