= Fashion 70s =

- Promotional poster
- Genre: Period drama; Romance; Family; Friendship
- Written by: Jung Sung-hee
- Directed by: Lee Jae-kyoo; Lee Jung-hyo
- Starring: Lee Yo-won; Kim Min-jung; Joo Jin-mo; Chun Jung-myung
- Country of origin: South Korea
- Original language: Korean
- No. of episodes: 28

Production
- Running time: 60 minutes
- Production companies: Kim Jong-hak Production; Sejung Group

Original release
- Network: Seoul Broadcasting System
- Release: May 23 – August 29, 2005

Fashion 70s (Korean: 패션 70s) is a 2005 South Korean television series starring Lee Yo-won, Kim Min-jung, Joo Jin-mo and Chun Jung-myung. It was the network's 60th Anniversary of Independence Great Project, and it aired on SBS from 23 May – 29 August 2005 on Mondays and Tuesdays at 21:55 for 28 episodes. An epic, sprawling drama, it focuses on the lives of four young people, from their childhood during the Korean War, to their careers and love lives as adults. It portrays the passion of female fashion designers who pioneered Korea's fashion industry in the 1970s.

== Plot ==
Young Joon-hee befriends little Kang-hee, but the two girls get into trouble because of Kang-hee's poor but greedy mother. Joon-hee also makes friends with two boys, Kim Dong-young, the son of a military general, and Jang Bin, the son of a fashion designer.

However, when North Korean forces invade their town, both girls are separated from their parents, and Joon-hee's mother is killed in an explosion. Believing his daughter to have died, Joon-hee's father adopts Kang-hee and raises her as his own daughter. Joon-hee is discovered at an orphanage by Kang-hee's mother, and is also adopted. The trauma of the events causes Joon-hee to block out her childhood memories and she grows up on a small island as Deo-mi, unaware of her true identity.

Years pass and all four of their paths cross again, with complicated, destructive results. Deo-mi dreams of becoming a fashion designer, and petty criminal Jang Bin helps her move to Seoul to chase her dream. In the process, he falls in love with her, but his feelings are unrequited. Deo-mi meets Dong-young, who has become an aide to the President, and although they do not recognize each other, there is an instant attraction between them. Kang-hee (now called Joon-hee) is also working in fashion and is already in love with Dong-young, but is heartbroken when she discovers he has fallen for Deo-mi instead.

Deo-mi and Joon-hee first become friends, then become each other's greatest rivals like Coco Chanel and Elsa Schiaparelli. They pursue both love and ambition with their lives against the backdrop of the fashion industry and the shifting social mores of 1970s Korea.

== Cast ==
- Lee Yo-won as Han Deo-mi
  - Byun Joo-yeon as young Joon-hee
- Kim Min-jung as Go Joon-hee
  - Jung Min-ah as Han Kang-hee
- Joo Jin-mo as Kim Dong-young
  - Kim Young-chan as young Dong-young
- Chun Jung-myung as Jang Bin
  - Eun Won-jae as young Bin
- Lee Hye-young as Jang Bong-shil
- Song Ok-sook as Lee Yang-ja
- Hyun Young as Ha Young-kyung
- Choi Il-hwa as General Kim
- Yoo Hye-ri as Byeol-dong
- Jeon In-taek as Go Chang-hwe
- Kim Byung-choon as Bang Yook-sung
- Jo Gye-hyung as Pierre Bang
- Jang Chae-won as Oh Sang-hee
- Kim Kwang-kyu as Detective
- Kim Jun-seong
- Jung So-young
- Bae Soo-bin
- Kim Hee-ra
- Ha Ji-won (cameo ep 3)

== Ratings ==
Fashion 70s was the 10th highest rated Korean drama of 2005 with an average viewership rating of 24+% and a peak of 29.1%.

Episode #	Original broadcast date		
Episode #	Original broadcast date	AGB Nielsen	
Episode #	Original broadcast date	Nationwide	Seoul National Capital Area
1	23 May 2005	15.1%	16.6%
2	24 May 2005	16.2%	18.6%
3	30 May 2005	17.1%	18.6%
4	31 May 2005	18.1%	19.1%
5	6 June 2005	21.3%	22.8%
6	7 June 2005	22.0%	23.8%
7	13 June 2005	20.4%	21.7%
8	14 June 2005	20.3%	21.7%
9	20 June 2005	NR	22.2%
10	21 June 2005	21.1%	22.2%
11	27 June 2005	21.7%	22.5%
12	28 June 2005	24.0%	24.8%
13	4 July 2005	24.3%	25.2%
14	5 July 2005	24.3%	25.3%
15	11 July 2005	24.4%	25.1%
16	12 July 2005	24.8%	25.5%
17	18 July 2005	25.5%	26.8%
18	19 July 2005	23.0%	23.7%
19	25 July 2005	23.9%	25.7%
20	26 July 2005	24.0%	24.8%
21	1 August 2005	20.4%	19.9%
22	2 August 2005	24.3%	25.0%
23	8 August 2005	26.8%	27.9%
24	9 August 2005	28.2%	30.1%
25	15 August 2005	27.4%	28.9%
26	16 August 2005	29.1%	31.3%
27	22 August 2005	26.2%	27.3%
28	29 August 2005	26.7%	29.9%

== International broadcast ==
- It aired in Vietnam on VTV1 from 18 November 2005.
- It aired in Philippines on QTV11 from June 2007

== See also ==
- List of Korean television shows
- Contemporary culture of South Korea
- Fashion
