= Triangle (2009 South Korean film) =

- Directed by: Ji Young-soo
- Written by: Masaya Ozaki
- Produced by: Kim Min; Shin Hyun-taek
- Starring: Ahn Jae-wook; Kang Hye-jung; Lee Soo-kyung
- Cinematography: Kim Kyung-chul
- Distributed by: CJ Entertainment
- Release date: November 29, 2009
- Running time: 92 minutes
- Countries: South Korea; Japan
- Language: Korean
- Budget: ₩1 billion
- Box office: US$10,655

Triangle (Korean: 트라이앵글; RR: Teuraiaenggeul) is a 2009 South Korean-Japanese comedy film starring Ahn Jae-wook, Kang Hye-jung and Lee Soo-kyung. A tense standoff between a wealthy young widow with a collection of world-famous art, a swindler with an eye on her collection, and a strange woman who blackmails him into including her in the con.

It was part of the "Telecinema7" project, seven feature-length mini-dramas which were collaborations between South Korean TV directors and Japanese TV screenwriters; the seven Korea-Japan joint productions both received a limited theater release and were broadcast on television. Triangle was first released in Korea in CGV theaters on November 29, 2009, and later aired on SBS (South Korea) and TV Asahi (Japan) in 2010.

== Plot ==
Ji-young is a beautiful widow of an extremely wealthy family who finds herself attracted to Sang-woo, whom she meets at a ski resort. Sang-woo is the CEO of a company that arranges art exhibitions, and Ji-young finds him different from the gold diggers who usually come on to her. She starts opening up to him, because he is gentle-natured and seems to be rich enough not to want her for her money. But actually, Sang-woo is a con artist who only has ₩4,000 left to his name. He approached her because he has his eye on an art piece called "Galatea's Tears" which is priced at over ₩2 billion. His attempts are thwarted each time by a woman named Sung-hye who always appears right before he is about to make a crucial move. She claims to be Ji-young's batchmate from high school, but Ji-young doesn't remember her at all. Sang-woo is suspicious of Sung-hye and follows her, only to have his cover blown. Sung-hye had, in fact, been targeting Sang-woo. He panics but is surprised when she proposes that he let her in on his scam to steal "Galatea's Tears."

== Cast ==
- Ahn Jae-wook – Ryu Sang-woo
- Kang Hye-jung – Oh Sung-hye
- Lee Soo-kyung – Han Ji-young
- Kang Shin-il – Vice President Son
- Lee Dae-yeon – Section Chief Kim
- Lee Sung-min – CEO Lee Byung-joon
- Heo Jung-gyu – Detective Won
- Park Jin-young – butler
- Cha Tae-hyun (cameo)

== See also ==
- The Relation of Face, Mind and Love
- Heaven's Postman
- 19-Nineteen
- Paradise
- After the Banquet
- A Dream Comes True
