= Heaven's Postman =

- Directed by: Lee Hyung-min
- Written by: Eriko Kitagawa
- Produced by: Shin Hyun-taek; Go Dae-jung
- Starring: Kim Jaejoong; Han Hyo-joo
- Cinematography: Jin Jin
- Music by: Erica YK Jung (Chung Yea-kyung)
- Distributed by: CJ Entertainment; Toho
- Release dates: November 11, 2009 (South Korea); May 29, 2010 (Japan)
- Running time: 107 minutes
- Countries: South Korea; Japan
- Language: Korean
- Box office: US$543,710

Heaven's Postman, also known as Postman to Heaven (Korean: 천국의 우편배달부; RR: Cheongukui Woopyeon Baedalbu; Tengoku e no Yuubin Haitatsunin (天国への郵便配達人)) is a 2009 South Korean-Japanese film starring Kim Jaejoong and Han Hyo-joo. A young CEO quits his job and becomes a kind of supernatural postman, delivering letters from grieving families and loved ones to the dead in heaven.

It was part of the "Telecinema7" project, seven feature-length mini-dramas which were collaborations between South Korean TV directors and Japanese TV screenwriters; the seven Korea-Japan joint productions both received a limited theater release and were broadcast on television. Heaven's Postman was first released in Korea in CGV theaters on November 11, 2009, and in Japanese cinemas on May 29, 2010. It later aired on SBS (South Korea) on September 25, 2010, and TV Asahi (Japan) in 2010.

== Plot ==
Jae-joon used to be a promising young CEO of an IT company, until he unexpectedly becomes a postman. He delivers the letters grieving people have written to their loved ones in Heaven. One day, he comes across Hana, who writes a letter full of resentment to the dead man that she used to love, and reveals his presence to her. Jae-joon proposes that Hana delivers responses which come back from Heaven and the two think up various ways to give peace and happiness to those who are alive and left behind, sometimes by writing the responses themselves. But a human being and a postman from Heaven cannot spend unlimited time together. As they start to grow feelings for each other, Jae-joon tries to pull himself away from Hana and the two, for the last time, deliver a response to an owner of a coffeehouse who had been agonizing for a long time over the loss of his son.

== Cast ==
- Kim Jae-joong as Shin Jae-joon / Yuu
- Han Hyo-joo as Jo Hana / Saki
- Shin Goo as Choi Geun-bae
- Kim Chang-wan as Lee Moon-gyo
- Yook Mi-ra as Moon-gyo's wife
- Joo Jin-mo as Yoon Jeon-soo
- Lee Doo-il as Goo Dae-bong
- Jang Jung-hee as Woo-sub's mother

== See also ==
- The Relation of Face, Mind and Love
- 19-Nineteen
- Triangle
- Paradise
- After the Banquet
- A Dream Comes True
