= Lee Jae-kyoo =

South Korean television and film director (born 1970)

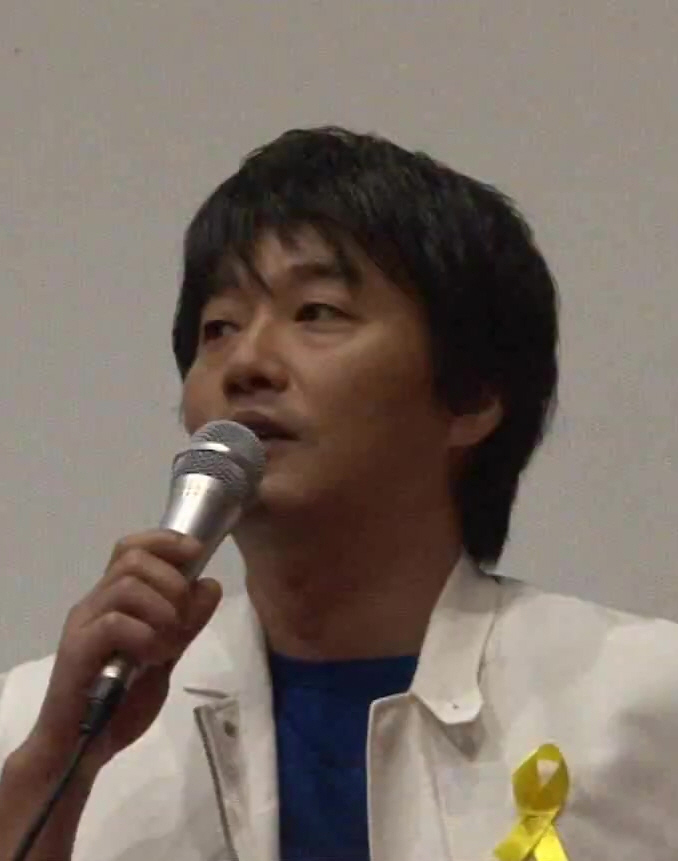
- Born: October 7, 1970 (age 56); South Korea
- Occupations: Television and film director
- Agent: Film Monster Co.

Korean name
- Hangul: 이재규
- RR: I Jaegyu
- MR: I Chaegyu

Lee Jae-kyoo (Korean: 이재규; born October 7, 1970) is a South Korean television and film director. Lee directed the television series, Damo (2003), Fashion 70's (2005), Beethoven Virus (2008), The King 2 Hearts (2012) and All of Us Are Dead (2022), as well as the films The Influence (2010), The Fatal Encounter (2014) and Intimate Strangers (2018). (Note: Attributed to multiple references:)

== Filmography ==
=== Film ===
==== As director ====
- The Night Before the Strike (1990)
- The Influence (2010)
- The Fatal Encounter (2014)
- Intimate Strangers (2018)

=== Television ===
==== As assistant director ====
- See and See Again (MBC, 1998–1999)
- Kuk-hee (MBC, 1999)
- Ajumma (MBC, 2000–2001)

==== As director ====
- Damo (MBC, 2003)
- Fashion 70's (SBS, 2005)
- Beethoven Virus (MBC, 2008)
- The King 2 Hearts (MBC, 2012)
- All of Us Are Dead (Netflix, 2022)
- Daily Dose of Sunshine (Netflix, 2023)

==== As producer ====
- Trap (OCN, 2019)

== Accolades ==
=== Awards and nominations ===
Name of the award ceremony, year presented, category, nominee of the award, and the result of the nomination
Award ceremony	Year	Category	Nominee	Result	Ref.
Asia Contents Awards & Global OTT Awards	2024	Best Creative	Daily Dose of Sunshine	Nominated	
Baeksang Arts Awards	2004	Best New Director (TV)	Damo	Won	
Baeksang Arts Awards	2024	Best Drama	Daily Dose of Sunshine	Nominated	
Bechdel Day	2024	Bechdel Choice 10	Daily Dose of Sunshine	Included	
Blue Dragon Series Awards	2024	Best Drama	Daily Dose of Sunshine	Won	
Busan OTT Series Awards 2024	2024	Medical Drama Special Award	Daily Dose of Sunshine	Won	
International Emmy Awards	2024	Best Comedy	Daily Dose of Sunshine	Nominated	
MBC Drama Awards	2008	Special Award in TV, Director	Beethoven Virus	Won	
7th Seoul International Drama Awards	2012	Outstanding Korean Drama (Silver Bird Prize)	The King 2 Hearts	Won	
