= Beethoven Virus =

2008 South Korean television series

- Promotional poster
- Genre: Romance; Music
- Written by: Hong Jin-ah; Hong Ja-ram
- Directed by: Lee Jae-kyoo
- Starring: Kim Myung-min; Lee Ji-ah; Jang Keun-suk
- Music by: Lee Pil-ho
- Country of origin: South Korea
- Original language: Korean
- No. of episodes: 18

Production
- Executive producer: Oh Kyung-hoon
- Producer: Park Chang-shik
- Cinematography: Song In-hyuk; Hong Sung-wook
- Production company: Kim Jong-hak Production

Original release
- Network: MBC TV
- Release: September 10 – November 12, 2008

Beethoven Virus (Korean: 베토벤 바이러스) is a 2008 South Korean television series starring Kim Myung-min, Lee Ji-ah, and Jang Keun-suk. The show drew attention for being the first Korean drama to depict the lives of classical musicians and ordinary people who dream of becoming musicians. It aired on MBC from September 10 to November 12, 2008 on Wednesdays and Thursdays at 21:55 for 18 episodes.

== Synopsis ==
Kang Gun-woo (or Kang Mae) is a world-renowned orchestra maestro who is a perfectionist. He is not an easy person to work with and is feared by all his players. By chance, he comes across a woman named Du Ru-mi who plays the violin, and a young police officer also named Kang Gun-woo who is a musical genius without formal training. The three soon get tangled in a love triangle as Kang Mae attempts to salvage a local orchestra.

=== The unlikely orchestra ===
Du Ru-mi works as a public civil officer, but dreams of playing in the orchestra one day. Her chance arrives when she get approved to make Seokran a music city, with the budget to hire an orchestra.

However, she is scammed for 300 million won (300 thousand US dollars in 2008) by the promoter. The professional members refuse to play without being paid so as the last resort, she assembles a group of players who are willing to perform for free, including:

- Jung Hee-yeon, a housewife playing cello
- Bae Yong-gi, a cabaret playing trumpet
- Kim Gab-yong, an oboist with Alzheimer's disease
- Ha Yi-deun, a high school student playing flute
- Kang Gun-woo, a traffic police officer playing trumpet
- and Du Ru-mi herself, playing violin.

However, the world class conductor Kang Gun-woo, demands the best performance from the very best players. It is revealed that it is his first time returning to Korea in 10 years, after refusing to conduct a performance in front of the president and the general public, believing that his orchestra was not good enough.

After discouvering the state of the members, Maestro Kang long demands to immediately return to Vienna after the first rehearsal. However, as Du Ru-mi and Kang Gun-woo help rescue Maestro Kang's dog from an overdose, he agrees to conduct the local orchestra. Despite high tension and hesitation to continue, he stays until the end and leads the local orchestra to do a nearly impossible performance. Maestro Kang is offered a director position for the newly created Seokran Orchestra, a lifetime position that he has been dreaming for many years. He decides to accept the position, but fires all the local orchestra members, much to their collective dismay.

=== The Ninth Symphony ===
The local members are outraged, but have to concede as Maestro Kang hires true professionals with unquestionably higher standards. But the local members don't give up. They stand in as the temporary members, practice Beethoven Ninth's Symphony secretly, hoping they will be selected when Maestro Kang selects this symphony to be performed. And their chance finally comes when Maestro Kang bows to public demand.

== Cast ==
=== Main characters ===
- Kim Myung-min as Kang Gun-woo/Kang Mae (Conductor)

Kang Gun-woo is an orchestra conductor who is a forty-year-old single man that lives with a dog named Toven (named after Beethoven). Conductor Kang feels that classical music is for the nobility thus the players should be extremely talented. Because of this belief, he insults many musicians who do not match his vision of perfection. However, he has shown to be jealous in the past to those who are naturally talented, or those who are prodigies in music, such as Maestro Jung. He has shown that he hates the trumpet player Kang Gun-woo for being a genius in the beginning of the drama.

Kang Mae is notorious for his aggressiveness and sharp tongue thus his nickname "orchestra killer." He has spent most of his time overseas because he had once refused to perform in front of a large audience, which included the president.

- Lee Ji-ah as Du Ru-mi (Violin)

Du Ru-mi is the concert mistress of the project orchestra. Despite her delicate appearance and optimism, she is actually hot-tempered and moody. Her headaches and tinnitus are the symptoms of a tumor that is impinging on her cochlear nerve, an acoustic neuroma, which could eventually cause complete hearing loss. Now, she has a resolute goal to play the violin and perform on stage until she loses her hearing completely.

- Jang Keun-suk as Kang Gun-woo (Trumpet)

Kang Gun-woo is a traffic officer with a strong sense of justice. To help a pregnant woman get to the hospital, he moves a car by crashing it into another car, which causes him to be suspended from his position. Even though he cannot read music, he has a natural talent for playing the trumpet and for music itself. He joins the orchestra due to Ru-mi's recommendation and it gives him an opportunity to open his eyes and ears to music and conducting.

=== Supporting characters ===
- Lee Soon-jae as Kim Gab-yong (Oboe)
- Hyun Jyu-ni as Ha Yi-deun (Flute)
- Song Ok-sook as Jung Hee-yeon (Cello)
- Park Chul-min as Bae Yong-gi (Trumpet)
- Jung Suk-yong as Park Hyuk-kwon (Double Bass)
- Lee Bong-gyu as Park Jin-man, husband of Hee-yeon
- Kim Young-min as Jung Myung-hwan
- Jo Se-eun as Kim Joo-yeon (Violin)
- Park Eun-joo as Kim Joo-hee (Violin)
- Lee Jae-hui as Hong Joon-gi (Clarinet)
- Lee Myung-ho as Kwon Joong-jin (French Horn)
- Lee Han-wi as Kang Chun-bae
- Park Kil-soo as Kim Kye-jang
- Hwang Young-hee as Hwang Young-hee, wife of Hyuk-kwon
- Baek Jae-jin as Joo Hyeon-cheol, leader of flood refugees
- Kim Ik as doctor (ep 10)
- Ryu Ui-hyun

== Production ==
At the drama's press conference prior to airing, Kim Myung-min, who plays the talented yet difficult maestro Kang, actually conducted Ennio Morricone's Gabriel's Oboe and Johannes Brahms' Hungarian Dances with a full orchestra in front of reporters and fans who came to the venue. Kang is based on real-life conductor Shin-ik Hahm.

Several famous musicians made cameo appearances in the drama, including pianist Dong-Hyek Lim and violist Richard Yongjae O'Neill.

== Awards and nominations ==
Year	Award	Category	Recipient	Result
2008	45th Baeksang Arts Awards	Best Drama	Beethoven Virus	Nominated
2008	45th Baeksang Arts Awards	Best Director	Lee Jae-kyoo	Nominated
2008	45th Baeksang Arts Awards	Best Actor	Kim Myung-min	Won
2008	45th Baeksang Arts Awards	Best Screenplay	Hong Jin-ah and Hong Ja-ram	Nominated
2008	21st Grimae Awards	Special Award, Drama category	Song In-hyuk and Hong Sung-wook	Won
2008	The National Assembly Society of Popular Culture & Media Awards	Most Popular Drama in 2008	Beethoven Virus	Won
2008	9th Broadcaster Awards	Best Performance in Broadcasting	Kim Myung-min	Won
2008	2nd Korea Drama Awards	Grand Prize (Daesang)	Kim Myung-min	Won
2008	2nd Korea Drama Awards	Top Excellence Award, Actor	Kim Myung-min	Nominated
2008	2nd Korea Drama Awards	Excellence Award, Actor	Jang Keun-suk	Nominated
2008	21st Korean Producers and Directors' Awards	Best Drama	Beethoven Virus	Won
2008	MBC Drama Awards	Grand Prize (Daesang)	Kim Myung-min	Won
2008	MBC Drama Awards	Top Excellence Award, Actor	Kim Myung-min	Nominated
2008	MBC Drama Awards	Excellence Award, Actress	Lee Ji-ah	Nominated
2008	MBC Drama Awards	Golden Acting Award, Supporting Actor	Park Chul-min	Won
2008	MBC Drama Awards	Golden Acting Award, Veteran Actress	Song Ok-sook	Won
2008	MBC Drama Awards	PD Award	Lee Soon-jae	Won
2008	MBC Drama Awards	Best New Actor	Jang Keun-suk	Won
2008	MBC Drama Awards	Best New Actress	Juni	Nominated
2008	MBC Drama Awards	Writer(s) of the Year	Hong Jin-ah and Hong Ja-ram	Won
2008	MBC Drama Awards	Special Award, PD category	Lee Jae-kyoo	Won
2008	MBC Drama Awards	Viewer's Favorite Drama of the Year	Beethoven Virus	Won
2009	36th Korean Broadcasting Association Awards	Best Actor	Kim Myung-min	Won
2009	4th Seoul International Drama Awards	Best Miniseries	Beethoven Virus	Runner-up
2009	4th Seoul International Drama Awards	Best Actor	Kim Myung-min	Nominated
2009	3rd International Drama Festival in Tokyo	Special Award for Foreign Programs	Beethoven Virus	Won

== International broadcast ==
The series aired in the Philippines on Q Channel 11 (now GTV) beginning April 12, 2010, on Mondays to Fridays at 2:00 p.m. It aired in Japan on Fuji TV beginning February 1, 2011, on Mondays to Fridays, at 2:07-3:57 p.m.

It aired in Thailand on Channel 3 beginning July 21, 2012, on Saturdays and Sundays at 1:30-4:00 a.m.

It aired in Indonesia on B-Channel beginning October 9, 2013, on Wednesday & Thursday at 7:00 p.m. - 8:00 p.m.
