= Thrice Married Woman =

- Promotional poster
- Also known as: Three Times Married Woman; The Woman Who Married Three Times; She Gets Married Thrice
- Genre: Romance; Melodrama; Family
- Written by: Kim Soo-hyun
- Directed by: Son Jung-hyun
- Starring: Lee Ji-ah; Uhm Ji-won; Song Chang-eui; Ha Seok-jin; Seo Young-hee; Jo Han-sun
- Music by: Kim Hyeong-jung
- Country of origin: South Korea
- Original language: Korean
- No. of episodes: 40

Production
- Executive producers: Han Jung-hwan; Choi Soon-kyu; Ahn Jae-hyun; Shin Sang-yoon
- Producers: Lee Hee-soo; Park Young-soo
- Production company: Samhwa Networks

Original release
- Network: SBS TV
- Release: 9 November 2013 – 30 March 2014

Thrice Married Woman (Korean: 세번 결혼하는 여자; RR: Sebeon gyeolhonhaneun yeoja) is a 2013 South Korean weekend drama starring Lee Ji-ah, Uhm Ji-won, and Song Chang-eui. Written by Kim Soo-hyun, it aired on SBS TV from November 9, 2013, to March 30, 2014, on Saturdays and Sundays at 21:55 KST (12:55 GMT) for 40 episodes.

== Plot ==
The story is about a woman and her two adult daughters. The older sister, Oh Hyun-soo, is a pet products designer, while the younger sister, Oh Eun-soo, gets remarried after a failed marriage.

== Cast ==
=== Main characters ===
- Lee Ji-ah as Oh Eun-soo
- Uhm Ji-won as Oh Hyun-soo
- Song Chang-eui as Jung Tae-won
- Ha Seok-jin as Kim Joon-goo
- Seo Young-hee as Park Joo-ha
- Jo Han-sun as Ahn Kwang-mo

=== Supporting characters ===
Oh family

- Han Jin-hee as Oh Byung-sik
- Oh Mi-yeon as Lee Soon-shim
- Kim Ji-young as Jung Seul-ki

Jung family

- Kim Jung-nan as Jung Tae-hee
- Kim Yong-rim as Mrs. Choi

Kim family

- Kang Boo-ja as Son Bosal
- Kim Yong-gun as Chairman Kim Myung-ye
- Kim Ja-ok as Mrs. Son

Extended cast

- Oh Mi-hee as Chun Kyung-sook
- Jang Hee-jin as Lee Da-mi
- Son Yeo-eun as Han Chae-rin
- Yang Hee-kyung as Yoo Min-sook (cameo)
- Son Woo-hyuk

== Production ==
The drama faced casting difficulties prior to filming. Han Ga-in and Chun Jung-myung were initially considered for the cast (Han in the leading role of Oh Eun-soo) and even attended the read-through, but were later removed from consideration, reportedly by popular but demanding drama writer Kim Soo-hyun. Kim Sa-rang was next considered for the role, but also didn't make the cut. After much media coverage, Lee Ji-ah was eventually cast.

It was also originally slated to be directed by Jung Eul-young, Kim Soo-hyun's longtime collaborator. But Jung dropped out due to health issues, and was replaced by producer Son Jung-hyun.

== Awards and nominations ==
Year	Award	Category	Recipient	Result
2014	50th Paeksang Arts Awards	Best New Actress (TV)	Son Yeo-eun	Nominated
2014	7th Korea Drama Awards	Top Excellence Award, Actress	Lee Ji-ah	Nominated
2014	3rd APAN Star Awards	Top Excellence Award, Actress in a Serial Drama	Lee Ji-ah	Nominated
2014	22nd SBS Drama Awards	Top Excellence Award, Actress in a Serial Drama	Lee Ji-ah	Nominated
2014	22nd SBS Drama Awards	Top Excellence Award, Actress in a Serial Drama	Uhm Ji-won	Nominated
2014	22nd SBS Drama Awards	Excellence Award, Actor in a Serial Drama	Ha Seok-jin	Nominated
2014	22nd SBS Drama Awards	Excellence Award, Actor in a Serial Drama	Song Chang-eui	Won

== International broadcast ==
- Thailand - It aired on PPTV beginning October 13, 2015.
- Vietnam - It aired on HTV7 beginning March 5, 2015.
