= Song Ok-sook =

South Korean actress (born 1960)

- Born: August 14, 1960 (age 66); Seoul, South Korea
- Education: Chung-Ang University - Theater and Film; Yonsei University Graduate School of Journalism and Mass Communication - Master's degree
- Occupation: Actress
- Years active: 1980–present
- Agent: Parkwith Entertainment
- Spouse: Lee Jong-in

Korean name
- Hangul: 송옥숙
- Hanja: 宋玉淑
- RR: Song Oksuk
- MR: Song Oksuk

Song Ok-sook (Korean: 송옥숙; born August 14, 1960) is a South Korean actress. She has appeared in supporting roles in numerous television dramas, including Winter Sonata, Beethoven Virus, More Charming by the Day, and Missing You.

Song is also a full-time professor in the Department of Film Arts at the Dong-Ah Institute of Media and Arts since 2005. She is an advocate of adoption.

== Filmography ==
=== Television series ===
Year	Title	Role	Network
1984	MBC Bestseller Theater': "The Story of a Woman like a Small Octopus"		MBC
1984	You		MBC
1984	MBC Bestseller Theater: "Unruly Child"		MBC
1984	MBC Bestseller Theater: "Sa-ra's Tears"		MBC
1985	MBC Bestseller Theater: "Divorce Party"		MBC
1985	MBC Bestseller Theater: "Wildflowers in the Wind"		MBC
1985	A Human Land		MBC
1986	MBC Bestseller Theater: "Wind"		MBC
1991	We Are Middle Class	Se-ra	KBS2
1992	Small Town	Madam Jang	SBS
1993	Good Morning Yeongdong!		KBS2
1997	Beautiful Woman	Jang Soon-ja	SBS
1998	The Great King's Road	Court Lady Heo	MBC
1998	For Love		MBC
1999	Magic Castle	Bang Choon-ja	KBS2
2002	Winter Sonata	Kang Mi-hee	KBS2
2002	Man of the Sun, Lee Je-ma	Ms. Gong	KBS2
2002	Glass Slippers	Oh Kim Sun	SBS
2003	The Bean Chaff of My Life	Kim Hyun-ja	MBC
2003	Drama City: "To William"	Sun-ja	KBS2
2003	First Love	Hee-soo's mother	SBS
2004	Drama City: "Cherry Blossom Daughter-in-law"	Jeom-rye	KBS2
2005	Drama City: "Fox, Fox"	Oh Soo-hee	KBS2
2005	5th Republic	Kim Ok-suk	MBC
2005	Fashion 70s	Lee Yang-ja	SBS
2005	Only You	Park Mi-jung	SBS
2005	MBC Best Theater: "Crying in the Glow of Sunset"	Hyeong-gook's mother	MBC
2005	Love Needs a Miracle	Park Soon-ae	SBS
2005	KBS TV Novel: "Hometown Station"	Soon-deok	KBS1
2006	Hello God	Woman from Bongpyeong	KBS2
2006	My Lovely Fool	Choi Jung-min	SBS
2006	Jumong	Bi Geum-seon	MBC
2006	My Beloved Sister	Yoon Soo-ah's mother	MBC
2007	Love Isn't Stop		KBS N
2007	Witch Yoo Hee	Geum Bok-joo	SBS
2007	Fly High	Lee Sung-hee	SBS
2007	Belle	Kang Soon-ae	KBS1
2007	Cruel Love	Lee Jin-sook	KBS2
2008	Woman of Matchless Beauty, Park Jung-geum	Cha Kwang-soon	MBC
2008	Wanted: Son-in-Law	Park Soon-ae	SBS
2008	Don't Ask Me About the Past	Han Hyo-jung	OCN
2008	Hometown of Legends: "Curse of the Sajin Sword"	Gook-moo	KBS2
2008	Beethoven Virus	Jung Hee-yeon	MBC
2008	Innocent You	Kim Hee-sook	SBS
2009	Can Anyone Love?	Managing director Kim	SBS
2009	Queen Seondeok	Seori	MBC
2009	Smile, You	Baek Geum-ja	SBS
2009	Son of Man	Dong-pal's mother	KBS2
2010	Pasta	Seo Yoo-kyung's mother	MBC
2010	More Charming by the Day	Song Ok-sook	MBC
2010	Big Thing	Madam Min	SBS
2011	The Thorn Birds	Kim Kye-soon	KBS2
2011	While You Were Sleeping	Na Pil-boon	SBS
2011	Deep Rooted Tree	Woman from Dodam	SBS
2011	Brain	Kim Soon-im	KBS2
2011	What's Up?	Jang Jae-heon's mother	MBN
2012	Rooftop Prince	Gong Man-ok	SBS
2012	Bridal Mask	Mrs. Han	KBS2
2012	Only Because It's You	Ma Joo-hee	SBS
2012	Seoyoung, My Daughter	Kim Kang-soon	KBS2
2012	Missing You	Kim Myung-hee	MBC
2013	Ugly Alert	Bang Jung-ja	SBS
2013	Goddess of Fire	Son Haeng-soo	MBC
2014	Big Man	Hong Dal-sook	KBS2
2014	Only Love	Oh Mal-sook	SBS
2014	You Are My Destiny	Kim Mi-young's mother	MBC
2014	Drama Festival: "Lump in My Life"	Yeo-ok	MBC
2014	Punch	Park Jung-hwan's mother	SBS
2015	House of Bluebird	Oh Min-ja	KBS2
2015	Flower of Queen	Gu Yang-soon	MBC
2016	Five Enough	Park Ok-soon	KBS2
2016	Squad 38	Noh Bang-shil	OCN
2017	Missing 9	Jo Hee-kyung	MBC
2017	My Father Is Strange	Ok Bok-nyeo	KBS
2017	Love Returns	Kim Haeng-ja	KBS
2018	Fates & Furies	Han Sung-sook	SBS
2019	Special Labor Inspector	Choi Se-ra	MBC
2019	Catch the Ghost	Kim Hyeong-ja	tvN
2020–2021	Cheat on Me If You Can	Yeom Jin-ok	KBS2
2021–2022	Uncle	Shin Hwa-ja	TV Chosun
2022	The Golden Spoon	Grandma Gem spoon	MBC
2024	Dog Knows Everything	Song Ok-suk	KBS2

=== Film ===
Year	Title	Role
1973	A She-Sailor	
1985	Mother	Young-ja
1986	Dan Martial Arts	
1986	Hero's Love Song	
1990	I Stand Up Every Day	Sook-hee
1990	Oseam	
1992	Walking All the Way to Heaven	
1995	A Hot Roof	Young-hee's mother
1996	Farewell My Darling	Madam Go
1996	Kill the Love	Mother
1997	Sky Doctor	Mrs. Na
1998	Spring in My Hometown	Sung-min's mother
1999	The Harmonium in My Memory	Yun Hong-yeon's mother
2000	Just Do It!	Won Jung-rim
2001	Summertime	Gi-ok
2001	My Sassy Girl	Gyeon-woo's mother
2001	I Love You	Hyun-soo's mother
2001	Ray-Ban	Bong-nyeo
2003	The First Amendment of Korea	Woman from Bongchun
2003	Garden of Heaven	Moon Hye-ja
2003	Eunjangdo (Silver Knife)	Min-seo's mother
2010	Happy Killers	Choi Jung-min's mother
2010	Grand Prix	Seo Ju-hee's mother

== Theater ==
Year	Title	Role
2004	The Seagull	Irina Nikolayevna Arkadina
2010	The Most Beautiful Goodbye in the World	In-hee
2023	The Dressing Room	A

== Awards and nominations ==
Year	Award	Category	Nominated work	Result
1995	16th Blue Dragon Film Awards	Best Supporting Actress	A Hot Roof	Won
2005	SBS Drama Awards	Best Supporting Actress		Won
2008	MBC Drama Awards	Golden Acting Award, Veteran Actress	Beethoven Virus	Won
2009	SBS Drama Awards	Best Supporting Actress in a Special Planning Drama	Smile, You	Nominated
2010	24th Yechong Cultural Arts Award	Recipient, 지역부문	—N/a	Won
2010	MBC Entertainment Awards	Top Excellence Award, Actress in a Sitcom/Comedy	More Charming by the Day	Won
2011	SBS Drama Awards	Special Award, Actress in a Drama Special	Deep Rooted Tree	Won
2012	SBS Drama Awards	Special Award, Actress in a Drama Special	Rooftop Prince	Nominated
2014	MBC Drama Awards	Golden Acting Award, Actress	You Are My Destiny	Nominated
2017	MBC Drama Awards	Golden Acting Award, Actress in a Soap Opera	Person Who Gives Happiness	Won
