= The Relation of Face, Mind and Love =

- Hangul: 내눈에 콩깍지
- RR: Naenune kongkkakji
- MR: Naenune k'ongkkakchi
- Directed by: Lee Jang-soo
- Written by: Shizuka Oishi
- Produced by: Shin Hyun-taek; Oh Nam-seok; Yoo Hong-goo
- Starring: Kang Ji-hwan; Lee Ji-ah
- Cinematography: Kim Seung-ho
- Production company: Samhwa Networks
- Distributed by: CJ Entertainment
- Release date: November 5, 2009
- Running time: 107 minutes
- Countries: South Korea; Japan
- Language: Korean
- Budget: ₩1 billion
- Box office: US$336,919

The Relation of Face, Mind and Love (Korean: 내눈에 콩깍지) is a 2009 South Korean-Japanese film starring Kang Ji-hwan and Lee Ji-ah. The romantic comedy film ponders the classic question of how much looks matter when it comes to love, when a good-looking architect finds the perfect woman, except for the fact that she is not very pretty.

It was part of the "Telecinema7" project, seven feature-length mini-dramas which were collaborations between South Korean TV directors and Japanese TV screenwriters; the seven Korea-Japan joint productions both received a limited theater release and were broadcast on television. The Relation of Face, Mind and Love was first released in Korea in CGV theaters on November 5, 2009, and later aired on SBS (South Korea) on April 4, 2010, and TV Asahi (Japan) in 2010.

Alternate titles are My Love, Ugly Duckling and Oh My Venus.

== Plot ==
Kang Tae-poong is a handsome and successful architect who constantly emphasizes the importance of substance over style in architecture, but has yet to apply this philosophy when it comes to love. Until one day, after a minor car accident, he suddenly suffers from a "temporary visual impairment" that makes beauties appear ugly and vice versa. When an inebriated and hot-tempered Wang So-jung passes out in front of Tae-poong's office building, he sees her as the beautiful resurrection of his dead fiancée and falls head over heels. Ugly duckling So-jung is completely baffled when Tae-poong keeps calling her his "goddess," but she soon makes him fall in love with her for her true charms, like how she is humble and unafraid to be goofy. Tae-poong's eye problem is fixed, however, by the time So-jung returns from a business trip a few days later, and when they meet again, he fails to recognize her.

== Cast ==
- Kang Ji-hwan as Kang Tae-poong
- Lee Ji-ah as Wang So-jung
- Lee Dong-hoon as Eun-soo, doctor
- Hwang Jung-eum as Eun-bin
- Jeon Soo-kyung as Editor
- Hwang Bo-ra as Tae-young
- Kang Chan-yang as Lee Ha-na, Eun-soo's wife
- Park No-shik as taxi driver
- Yoon Mi-kyung as blind date woman 1
- Kim Do-yeon as Attendant
- Son Ga-young as aircrew
- Sung Joon as younger doctor

== See also ==
- Heaven's Postman
- 19-Nineteen
- Triangle
- Paradise
- After the Banquet
- A Dream Comes True
