= Damo (Korea) =

Servant caste in Joseon

Damo specifically refers to class of servants during the Joseon period who were considered lower than slaves in their overall ranking within Korean society. Their main responsibility was to serve tea to the gentries. (Damo is literally translated as "Tea Lady".) Damos were also employed in the palace to work as attendants in various government departments.

Historical records have indicated that in certain times, Damos were used as police officers to investigate crime, mostly for adultery and other crimes involving women, where male investigators could not ask questions about the case without causing embarrassment. They were required to be " taller than 150 centimeters, be very agile, flexible, lift 40 kilograms of rice, and even withstand large quantities of alcohol without getting drunk." The damo carried special identification that verified their authority, and were equipped with a small iron flail that could be used to break down doors and rope to apprehend criminals. Arguably, the damo were the first female police with arrest capabilities in the world.

This unique institution was the main inspiration for the 2003 Korean mini-series Damo, which in turn was based on Bang Hak-gi's manhwa Damo Nam-soon.
