= After the Banquet (film) =

- Hangul: 결혼식 후에
- RR: Gyeolhonsik hue
- MR: Kyŏrhonsik hue
- Directed by: Kim Yoon-cheol
- Written by: Rie Yokota
- Produced by: Shin Hyun-taek; Jang Jung-do
- Starring: Shin Sung-woo; Ye Ji-won; Bae Soo-bin; Go Ah-sung
- Cinematography: Jo Yong-gyu
- Distributed by: CJ Entertainment
- Release date: December 3, 2009
- Running time: 101 minutes
- Countries: South Korea; Japan
- Language: Korean
- Budget: ₩1 billion
- Box office: US$1,240

After the Banquet (Korean: 결혼식 후에; RR: Gyeolhonsik hue; lit. 'After the Wedding') is a 2009 South Korean-Japanese romantic drama film starring Shin Sung-woo, Ye Ji-won, Bae Soo-bin, Kim Bo-kyung, Lee Hae-young, Seo Yoo-jung, Yoon Hee-seok, Cha Soo-yeon, and Go Ah-sung. A group of college alumni, mostly men, are reunited at a wedding. They are all looking forward to seeing one woman in particular, but to their surprise, the woman's daughter appears.

It was part of the "Telecinema7" project, seven feature-length mini-dramas which were collaborations between South Korean TV directors and Japanese TV screenwriters; the seven Korea-Japan joint productions both received a limited theater release and were broadcast on television. After the Banquet was first released in Korea in CGV theaters on December 3, 2009, and later aired on SBS (South Korea) and TV Asahi (Japan) in 2010.

== Plot ==
In the countryside at a Catholic church, luxurious cars come rolling in. A wedding is set to take place between Ji-hong and Yoo-ri. The couple met as music club members in college. Their friends from their university days are all arriving, most of whom haven't seen each other in 10 years.

Seong-ho is now a lawyer, and married. Hyeong-woo is now a university professor who is persistently single. Kyeong-ho is now a production director (PD) at a television station. Seong-joo is now a businesswoman, and she brought along her boyfriend who is 12 years younger. Min-hee has a stable family life.

All of these friends are in their mid-thirties. During the wedding they notice that one person from their music club, Jeong-hee, is missing.

After the wedding all the friends gather together at Ji-hong and Yoo-ri's vacation house. At the evening dinner, a young girl named Mi-rae appears. She informs the group that Jeong-hee was her mother and she died in a car accident one month ago. Furthermore, she tells everyone that she came here to meet her father. Tension, shock, and surprise overtakes the friends as they recall their relationships with Jeong-hee.

== Cast ==
- Shin Sung-woo as Kim Ji-hong
- Ye Ji-won as Lee Yoo-ri
- Bae Soo-bin as Kim Seong-ho
- Kim Bo-kyung as Han Seong-joo
- Lee Hae-young as Choi Hyeong-woo
- Seo Yoo-jung as Choi Min-hee
- Yoon Hee-seok as Park Kyeong-ho
- Cha Soo-yeon as Kim Jeong-hee
- Go Ah-sung as Mi-rae
- Lee Do-il as Kim Jae-won
- Kim Mu-yeol as Kim Hyeon-joon
- Yoon So-jung as Park Ok-soon
- Kim Da-in as Yoo Jae-yeon
- Lee Hwa-seon as Park Hye-ryung
- Jung Jae-jin as Shin-joo

== See also ==
- The Relation of Face, Mind and Love
- Heaven's Postman
- 19-Nineteen
- Triangle
- Paradise
- A Dream Comes True
