= Lee Ji-ah =

South Korean actress (born 1978)

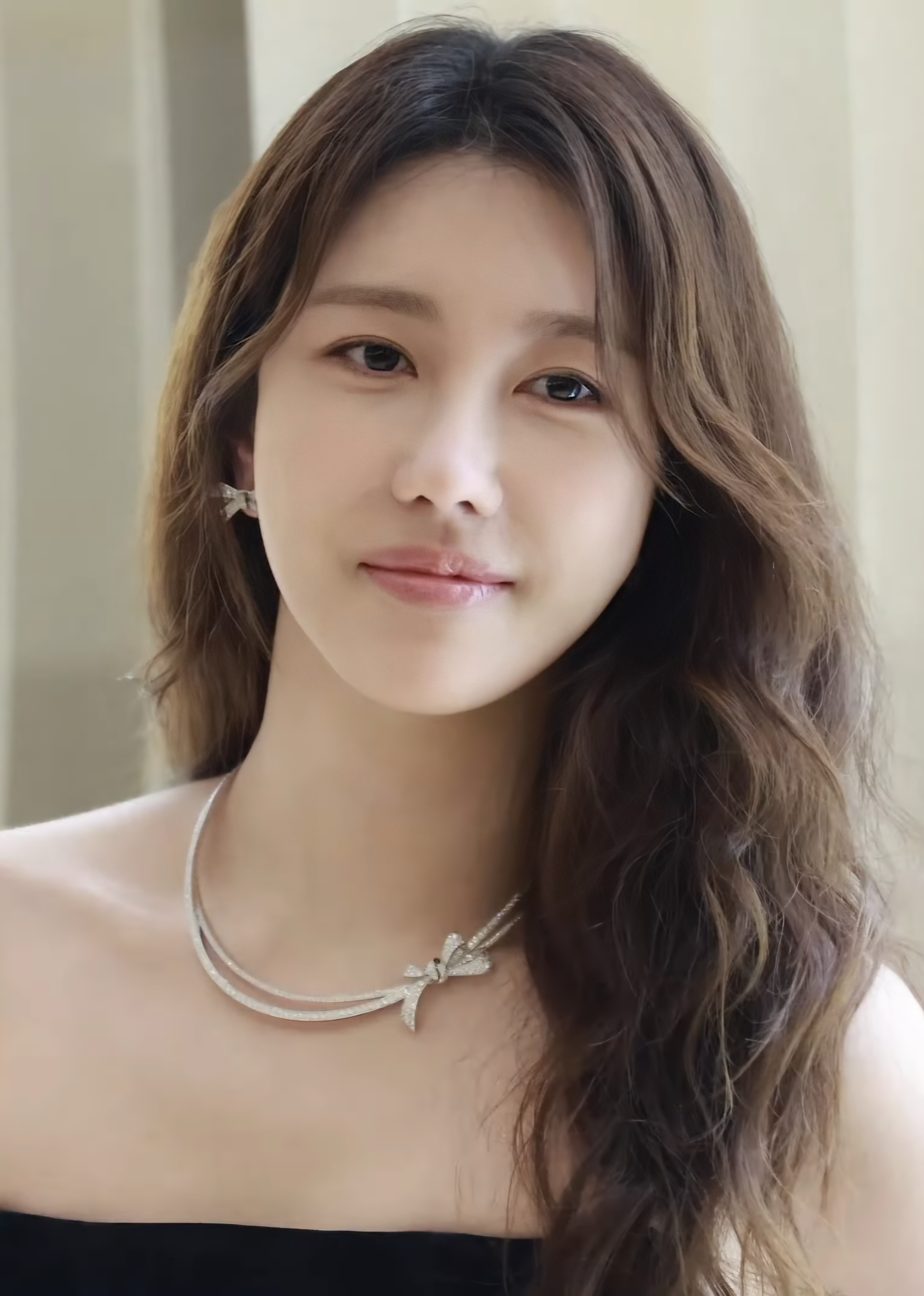
- Lee in May 2025
- Born: Kim Sang-eun; August 6, 1978 (age 48); Seoul, South Korea
- Other names: Kim Ji-ah; E Ji-ah
- Education: ArtCenter College of Design (Graphic design)
- Occupation: Actress
- Years active: 2007–present
- Agent: BH Entertainment
- Spouse: Seo Taiji (m. 1997; div. 2006)
- Family: Kim Soon-heung (Grandfather)

Korean name
- Hangul: 김지아
- RR: Gim Jia
- MR: Kim Chia

Stage name
- Hangul: 이지아
- Hanja: 李智雅
- RR: I Jia
- MR: I Chia

Former name
- Hangul: 김상은
- RR: Gim Sangeun
- MR: Kim Sangŭn

Signature
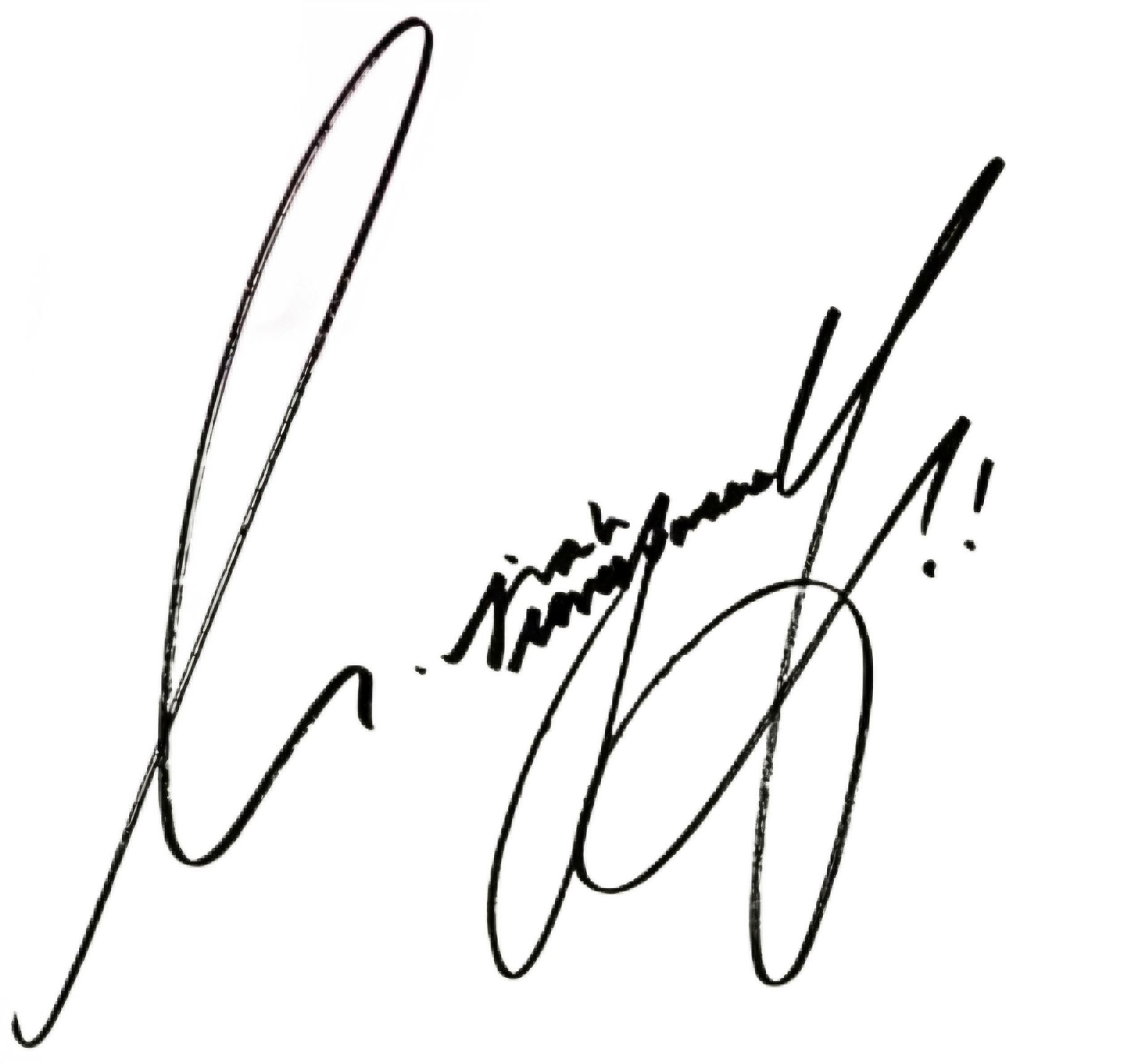

Kim Ji-ah (Korean: 김지아; born Kim Sang-eun, August 6, 1978), better known by the stage name Lee Ji-ah, is a South Korean actress. She rose to fame with her role in the television drama The Legend (2007), and has since further participated in Beethoven Virus (2008), Athena: Goddess of War (2010), Me Too, Flower! (2011), Thrice Married Woman (2013), My Mister (2018), The Penthouse: War in Life (2020–2021), and Queen of Divorce (2024).

== Early life ==
Lee was born as Kim Sang-eun on August 6, 1978, in Songpa District, Seoul, South Korea. Her grandfather was educator Kim Soon-heung, one of the patrons for the creation of the Seoul Arts High School and a former chairman of Kyunggi High School, who is best remembered today as a pro-Japanese collaborator. Her father was a businessman. She was in the sixth grade when her family moved to the U.S. and stayed there for 10 years.

She majored in graphic design at the Pasadena Art Center College of Design.

During a brief visit to Korea in 2004, she made her entertainment debut by appearing in an LG Telecom TV commercial with actor Bae Yong-joon. She left the U.S. and returned to Korea in early 2005 and legally changed her name from Kim Sang-eun to Kim Ji-ah and adopted the stage name Lee Ji-ah.

== Career ==
=== 2007–2013 ===
In 2007, Lee made her acting debut in the fantasy television series The Legend opposite Bae Yong-joon. The high-profile, big-budget production shot Lee instantly to stardom. At the year-end MBC Drama Awards, Lee won the Best New Actress award, Popularity award, and Best Couple award (with Bae). She again won Best New Actress for TV at the Baeksang Arts Awards a year later.

She then starred in 2008's Beethoven Virus wherein Lee played a violinist who gets diagnosed with a disease that results in complete hearing loss.

She was next cast in Style, a TV series based on the 2008 chick lit novel of the same title. Inspired by The Devil Wears Prada, Lee played a hardworking assistant to a perfectionist fashion magazine editor played by Kim Hye-soo. She next starred in the Korean-Japanese romance film The Relation of Face, Mind and Love alongside Kang Ji-hwan, which marks her big-screen debut.

In late 2009, she joined the seven-part "Telecinema" series, which brought together Korean stars and directors, and Japanese writers. Each "telecinema" was released in movie theaters and also aired on television on SBS.

Lee then co-starred along Jung Woo-sung, Cha Seung-won and Soo Ae in the 2010 spy series Athena: Goddess of War, a spin-off to 2009's Iris.

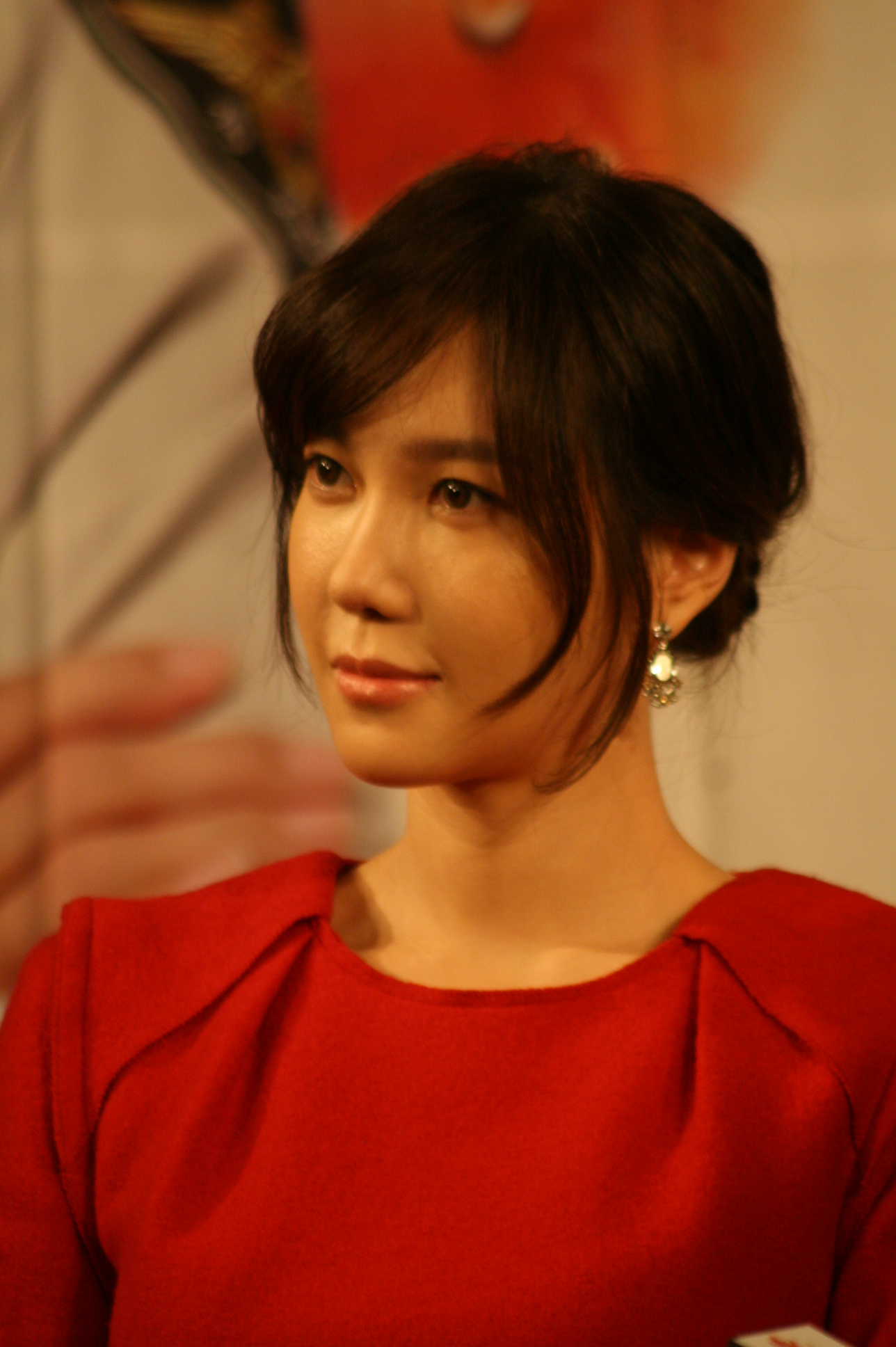
Lee at the Me too, flower! press conference in 2011

In 2011, she starred in the television drama Me Too, Flower!, playing an ill-tempered police officer who falls in love with a young millionaire masquerading as a parking attendant.

When Lee's five-year contract with Bae's agency KeyEast expired on December 31, 2011, she signed with Will Entertainment in March 2012. In 2013, she took on the leading role in Thrice Married Woman.

=== 2014–present ===
In April 2014, Lee signed with a new management agency, HB Entertainment. This was followed by a three-picture contract with Hollywood indie outfit Maybach Film Productions as a screenwriter.

In 2015, Lee starred in the two-episode fantasy drama Snow Lotus Flower.

In 2016, Lee made her big screen comeback in the action thriller film Musudan. In May 2016, Lee left HB Entertainment and signed with new management agency BH Entertainment.

In 2018, after a three-year hiatus, Lee made her return to the small screen in the melodrama My Mister. The same year, she was cast in the horror mystery drama The Ghost Detective.

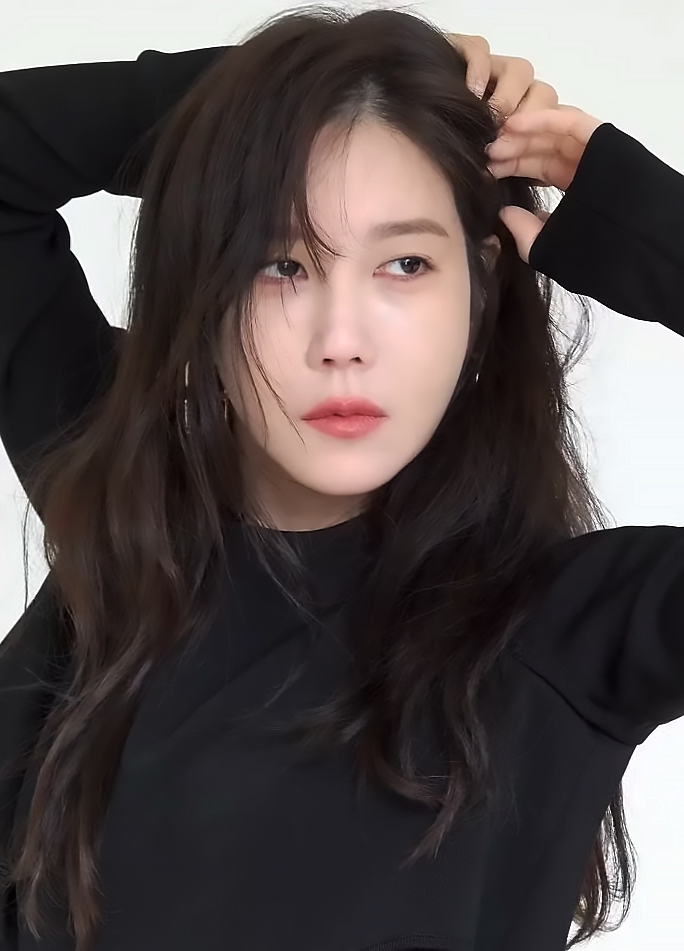
Lee for Vogue Korea in 2021

In 2020, she starred in TV series The Penthouse: War in Life aired on SBS TV from October 26, 2020, to September 10, 2021.

== Personal life ==
In March 2011, a photo taken by a tourist of Lee and Athena co-star Jung Woo-sung on a date in Paris surfaced on the internet, and the two confirmed that they were romantically involved.

On April 21, 2011, Sports Seoul broke the story (later confirmed by numerous media outlets) that she and Korean pop/rock icon Seo Taiji had been secretly married since 1997, before splitting in 2006. News leaked after two hearings had been held at the Seoul Family Court (court papers used Seo and Lee's birth names - Jeong Hyeon-cheol and Kim Sang-eun, respectively) since Lee filed a ₩5.5 billion lawsuit against Seo for alimony and division of assets. Both celebrities were believed to have been single. Lee left for the United States to study in 1993 and met Seo through an acquaintance at a concert in Los Angeles the same year. They developed a long-distance relationship through letters and phone calls while Lee stayed in the U.S. and Seo went back to Korea to continue his entertainment activities with his band Seo Taiji and Boys. In 1996, Seo announced his retirement from show business, after which he went to the U.S. where he and Lee quietly married on October 12, 1997. The couple lived in the States, moving to Atlanta and then Arizona. They separated when Seo returned to Korea in June 2000 for his comeback to the K-pop scene as a solo artist. Lee, who stayed behind in the U.S., began divorce proceedings in 2006 at the Santa Monica Family Court on the grounds of irreconcilable differences due to incompatible lifestyles and personalities. Lee claimed in the 2011 lawsuit that she filed for the divorce in 2006 and the court decision became effective in 2009, thus the three years required under Korean law for seeking alimony hadn't expired. But Seo's assertion was that the divorce officially took effect on August 9, 2006, and the statute of limitations had passed. Lee lodged the suit in January and withdrew it on April 30, citing psychological suffering after her private life was made public. Seo's lawyers opposed the motion, and Lee resumed her case, with her lawyer arguing that the California court ruling was invalid and that the two were still legally married. Through mediation, the ex-couple reached an out-of-court settlement in July 2011, which included a non-disclosure agreement.

== Filmography ==
=== Film ===
Year	Title	Role	Notes	Ref.
2009	The Relation of Face, Mind and Love	Wang So-jung		
2011	Athena: The Movie	Han Jae-hee		
2016	Musudan	Shin Yoo-hwa		
2020	Swimming Bird	Eun-chae	Short Film	
2022	It's Alright		TVING Shorts Film	

=== Television series ===
Year	Title	Role	Notes	Ref.
2007	The Legend	Sujini / Saeoh		
2008	Beethoven Virus	Du Ru-mi		
2009	Style	Lee Seo-jung		
2010	Athena: Goddess of War	Han Jae-hee		
2011	Me Too, Flower!	Cha Bong-sun		
2013	Thrice Married Woman	Oh Eun-soo		
2015	KBS Drama Special: "Snow Lotus Flower"	Han Yeon-woo	one act-drama	
2018	My Mister	Kang Yoon-hee		
2018	The Ghost Detective	Sun Woo-hye		
2020–2021	The Penthouse: War in Life	Shim Su-ryeon / Na Ae-kyo /Madame Na	Season 1–3	
2023	Pandora: Beneath the Paradise	Hong Tae-ra / Mun Ha-gyeong / No.50		
2024	Queen of Divorce	Kim Sa-ra		

=== Television show ===
Year	Title	Role	Notes	Ref.
2021	Sea of Hope	Cast member	Head Chef	
2021	The Home	Narrator	Space Grand Documentary Project	

=== Music video appearances ===
Year	Title	Artist
2010	"Please Come Back to Me"	Vibe

== Discography ==
=== Singles ===
Title	Year	Album
As lead artist
"Love Virus"	2008	Non-album single
"Cupcake and Alien"	2009	Non-album single
"Vampire Romance"	2010	Non-album single
As featured artist
"So Much" (Super Sta featuring Baby Boy's Soul and Lee Ji-ah)	2008	Non-album single

== Accolades ==
=== Awards and nominations ===
Name of the award ceremony, year presented, category, nominee of the award, and the result of the nomination
Award ceremony	Year	Category	Nominee / Work	Result	Ref.
APAN Star Awards	2014	Top Excellence Award, Actress in a Serial Drama	Thrice Married Woman	Nominated	
Baeksang Arts Awards	2008	Best New Actress (TV)	The Legend	Won	
Korea Drama Awards	2014	Top Excellence Award, Actress	Thrice Married Woman	Nominated	
Korea Culture and Entertainment Awards	2021	Grand Prize (Drama category)	The Penthouse: War in Life	Won	
MBC Drama Awards	2007	Best New Actress	The Legend	Won	
MBC Drama Awards	2007	Popularity Award, Actress	The Legend	Won	
MBC Drama Awards	2007	Best Couple Award	Lee Ji-ah (with Bae Yong-joon); The Legend	Won	
MBC Drama Awards	2008	Excellence Award, Actress	Beethoven Virus	Nominated	
SBS Drama Awards	2009	Excellence Award, Actress in a Drama Special	Style	Nominated	
SBS Drama Awards	2011	Top Excellence Award, Actress in a Special Planning Drama	Athena: Goddess of War	Nominated	
SBS Drama Awards	2014	Top Excellence Award, Actress in a Serial Drama	Thrice Married Woman	Nominated	
SBS Drama Awards	2020	Top Excellence Award, Actress in a Mid-Length Drama	The Penthouse: War in Life	Won	
SBS Drama Awards	2021	Top Excellence Award, Actress in a Miniseries Genre/Fantasy Drama	The Penthouse: War in Life 2 and 3	Nominated	
Seoul International Drama Awards	2021	Outstanding Korean Actress	The Penthouse: War in Life	Nominated	

=== Listicles ===
Name of publisher, year listed, name of listicle, and placement
Publisher	Year	Listicle	Placement	Ref.
Forbes	2022	Korea Power Celebrity 40	19th	
