= Me Too, Flower! =

2011 South Korean television series

- Promotional poster for Me Too, Flower!
- Also known as: Flower, I Am; Flower, Me Too; I'm a Flower, Too
- Genre: Romance; Comedy; Drama
- Written by: Kim Do-woo
- Directed by: Go Dong-sun
- Starring: Lee Ji-ah; Yoon Shi-yoon
- Country of origin: South Korea
- Original language: Korean
- No. of episodes: 15

Original release
- Network: Munhwa Broadcasting Corporation
- Release: November 9 – December 28, 2011

Me Too, Flower! (Korean: 나도 꽃; RR: Nado kkot) is a 2011 South Korean television series, starring Lee Ji-ah and Yoon Shi-yoon in lead roles, and a supporting cast led by Han Go-eun, Seo Hyo-rim, Jo Min-ki, and Lee Gi-kwang. It aired on MBC from November 9 to December 28, 2011 on Wednesdays and Thursdays at 21:55 for 15 episodes.

== Plot ==
The series follows the relationship of an abrasive female police officer and a millionaire masquerading as a parking attendant.

== Cast ==
- Lee Ji-ah as Cha Bong-sun
  - Kim Sung-kyung as young Cha Bong-soon
- Yoon Shi-yoon as Seo Jae-hee
- Han Go-eun as Park Hwa-young
- Seo Hyo-rim as Kim Dal
- Jo Min-ki as Park Tae-hwa
- Lee Gi-kwang as Jo Ma-roo and Pink Chicken
- Lee Byung-joon as Team Leader Kim
- Im Ha-ryong as Bae Sang-eok
- Jung Man-sik as Kim Do-kyun
- Baek Seung-hee as Lee Young-hee
- Kim Ji-sook as Kim Do-mi
- Gi Ju-bong as Dispatch chief
- Kim Ik as Sergeant Kang
- Kim Jong-pil as Sergeant Ko
- Hong Hyun-taek as Han Ah-in
- Son Il-kwon as Manager Lee
- Jung Soo-young as drunk woman (cameo)
- Lee Chung-mi as (cameo)
- Ma Dong-seok as detective (cameo)
- Park Ki-woong as Bong-sun's ex-boyfriend (cameo)
- Heo Ga-yoon as high school student (cameo)

== Production ==
Kim Jaewon was originally cast in the leading role of Seo Jae-hee. But on the first day of filming on October 4, 2011, he was injured when the moped he was riding malfunctioned and accidentally accelerated. After being diagnosed with a dislocated shoulder, bone fracture and torn ligaments and cartilage, he withdrew from the drama and was replaced by Yoon Shi-yoon.

== Ratings ==
Episode #	Original broadcast date	Average audience share			
Episode #	Original broadcast date	TNmS Ratings		AGB Nielsen	
Episode #	Original broadcast date	Nationwide	Seoul National Capital Area	Nationwide	Seoul National Capital Area
1	November 9, 2011	6.6%	8.7%	6.8%	7.9%
2	November 10, 2011	6.0%	7.7%	7.6%	9.7%
3	November 16, 2011	6.5%	7.7%	5.5%	7.9%
4	November 17, 2011	7.7%	10.2%	6.4%	9.0%
5	November 23, 2011	6.1%	9.1%	6.4%	9.2%
6	November 24, 2011	6.9%	9.3%	6.1%	9.0%
7	November 30, 2011	6.2%	9.5%	6.4%	9.2%
8	December 1, 2011	6.7%	9.7%	6.9%	9.4%
9	December 7, 2011	5.5%	8.9%	6.3%	8.4%
10	December 8, 2011	6.1%	8.5%	6.3%	9.5%
11	December 14, 2011	4.9%	9.2%	6.1%	8.8%
12	December 15, 2011	5.6%	8.5%	6.4%	9.1%
13	December 21, 2011	5.5%	9.2%	5.7%	9.8%%
14	December 22, 2011	5.1%	9.0%	5.8%	9.3%
15	December 28, 2011	6.4%	8.4%	8.1%	8.8%
Average		6.1%	8.9%	6.5%	9.0%

== International broadcast ==
- It aired in Japan on cable channel KNTV from July 26 to September 13, 2012, and terrestrial network TBS beginning September 3, 2012.
- It aired in Vietnam on HTV7 from October 4, 2014, under the title Tình cuồng si.
- It aired in Malaysia on TV9 from January 4, 2016.
