= Damo (TV series) =

South Korean television program

- Promotional poster for Damo
- Also known as: The Legendary Police Woman; Female Detective Damo; Damo: The Undercover Lady Detective; Damo, the Detective in Chosun
- Hangul: 조선 여형사 다모
- Hanja: 朝鮮 女刑事 茶母
- RR: Joseon yeohyeongsa damo
- MR: Chosŏn yŏhyŏngsa tamo
- Genre: Historical; Romance; Action
- Written by: Jung Hyung-soo
- Directed by: Lee Jae-kyoo
- Starring: Ha Ji-won; Lee Seo-jin; Kim Min-jun
- Country of origin: South Korea
- Original language: Korean
- No. of episodes: 14

Production
- Executive producer: Jo Joong-hyun
- Producer: Lee Jae-kyoo
- Running time: 60 minutes
- Production company: MBC

Original release
- Network: MBC TV
- Release: July 28 – September 9, 2003

Damo (Korean: 조선 여형사 다모; RR: Joseon yeohyeongsa damo; lit. 'Female Detective Damo in the Joseon Dynasty'; also known as The Legendary Police Woman) is a 2003 South Korean fusion historical drama, starring Ha Ji-won, Lee Seo-jin, and Kim Min-jun. Set in the Joseon period, it tells the story of Chae-ok, a damo relegated to the low-status job of a female police detective who investigates crimes involving women of the upper class. It aired on MBC from July 28 to September 9, 2003 on Mondays and Tuesdays at 21:55 for 14 episodes.

== Plot ==
Chae-ok is the daughter of a nobleman, who was framed for conspiracy and thereafter committed suicide. She got separated from her brother at the age of 7 when she was caught by the officer who then took her to be the slave of Hwangbo Yoon's family. Alongside him, she was raised in the mountains and learned martial arts and sword fighting. She has loved Yoon silently for years, knowing they cannot be together because he belongs to a higher social class. Instead when he becomes a police commander, she joins his bureau as a damo to continue being near him and working with him.

When Chae-ok goes undercover while investigating a counterfeiting ring, she meets the rebel leader Jang Sung-baek. She must try to arrest Sung-baek, but despite her bravery and resolve, she finds herself falling for him.

== Cast ==
- Ha Ji-won as Jang Jae-hui / Jang Chae-ok
  - Jung Min-ah as young Jae-hui / Chae-ok

Intelligent, virtually unbeatable and a great asset to the law enforcement establishment. Straightforward and honest, she cannot stand other people's lies and dirty deeds.

- Lee Seo-jin as Commander Hwangbo Yoon
  - Baek Sung-hyun as young Yoon

Born to a nobleman and his concubine, Hwangbo Yoon feels the loneliness of not belonging to either the noble class or the servant class. His only friend is Chae-ok, whom he loves with all his heart, but his love remains unspoken. Hardworking and diligent, he is quickly promoted through the ranks of the police force, leaving his rivals jealous. As the police commander of the Left Police Bureau, Yoon is loyal to the government, and has a deep, abiding love for his countrymen.

- Kim Min-jun as Jang Jae-mo / Jang Sung-baek

His family was destroyed when his father, a nobleman, was framed for conspiracy. He is adopted by lepers, and after training himself, soon becomes famous for his swordsmanship. Idealistic and passionate, he leads a group of rebels in protest against the Joseon social class system they deem unfair and unjust. When he meets Chae-ok, he must face the choice between love or duty to his cause.

=== Supporting cast ===
- Lee Moon-sik as Ma Chook-ji
- Noh Hyun-hee as Ta Bak-nyeo
- Park Yeong-gyu as Jo Se-wook
- Lee Han-wi as Baek Joo-wan
- Kwon Oh-joong as Lee Won-hae
- Yoon Mun-sik as Ahn Nok-sa
- Kwon Yong-woon as Noh Gak-chul
- Ahn Kye-beom as Kato Masayuki
- Kim Min-kyung as Soo-myung
- Shin Seung-hwan as Ahn Byung-taek
- Jung Wook as Jung Pil-joon
- Jung Ho-keun as Choi Dal-pyung
- Chae Young-in as Jo Nan-hee
- Hyun Seok as Jung Hong-doo
- Sunwoo Jae-duk as the King
- Jeon In-taek
- Seo Beom-shik
- Byun Hee-bong
- Cho Jae-hyun (cameo)

== Notes ==
- Damo has a dual meaning. One is literally "tea servant," while the second is the implicit understanding that damos in the Police Bureau were female police detectives. The drama presupposes that all people during the 17th century were aware of this dual meaning.
- In the Joseon Dynasty, rather than numbering political offices or government divisions with "first," "second," and "third," it was common to use, middle, right, and left. The use of "Left Police Bureau" and "Right Police Bureau" is not indicative of their domains over the city, but merely a numbering system in much the same way Americans have precincts and district numbers.
- With regards to the character Ma Chook-ji, "Chook-ji" is not his real first name. His real first name is never mentioned in the series. "Chook ji" literally means "compress space," more akin to a nickname like "Quick-foot Ma."

== Production ==
Adapted from Bang Hak-gi's manhwa Damo Nam-soon and with an expensive budget of ₩200 million per episode, Damo took more than a year to complete. It was filmed in Taean County, South Chungcheong Province. To help elevate the quality of the show, 80 percent of the series was pre-produced before airing, a rare occurrence among Korean dramas. It was also the first Korean drama completely shot with HD cameras (previously only used in documentaries). Steering away from traditional historical dramas (in Korean, sageuk; or taiga in Japanese dramas), Damo ushered in the new subgenre "fusion historical drama," with its use of flashy wuxia-style high-wire action, CG, and a soundtrack that combined traditional music with anachronistic modern rock/electronica.

== Reception ==
The series began with modest ratings (the first episode recorded 14 percent), but it soon began to gain popularity among viewers in their 20s and 30s. Damo was the first Korean drama in the Internet era to reach 1 million posts on the message board of its official website, which caused the site's servers to crash. It eventually passed 4 million posts.

Dedicated online fans coined the tongue-in-cheek moniker pyein (a word play on pain), referring to themselves as "crippled by pain" because they spend hours in front of a computer writing comments and discussions about the drama and chatting online with other viewers, to an extent of not being able to lead a normal life. The cast and crew also interacted with these netizens online, to better "read" viewers' reactions. Even long after the series had ended, the Damo pyeins continued to generate content, such as a newsletter called Damo Ilbo written in Joseon-era Korean language, music videos edited by fans themselves, and thousands of drawings related to the show. Online popularity led to revenue, and MBC earned an estimated ₩10 million a day through Internet residual fees. At the end of the drama's last episode, a caption onscreen read "We would like to thank the Damo pyeins." Damo, which had recorded average ratings of more than 20 percent, became mainstream thanks to the huge popularity it enjoyed online, and it turned into a cultural phenomenon, forcing TV networks to thereafter change their approach to ratings, online content, and viewer feedback.

Damo's cast, writer and director were recognized at the year-end MBC Drama Awards, and the 2004 Baeksang Arts Awards.

== Awards ==
2003 MBC Drama Awards

- Top Excellence Award, Actress - Ha Ji-won
- Excellence Award, Actor - Lee Seo-jin
- Best New Actor - Kim Min-jun
- Special Writer Award - Jung Hyung-soo
- Popularity Award - Ha Ji-won
- Best Couple Award - Ha Ji-won and Lee Seo-jin

2004 Baeksang Arts Awards

- Best New Director for TV - Lee Jae-kyoo
- Best New Actor for TV - Kim Min-jun

2004 Asian Television Awards

- Best Drama Series
