= 19-Nineteen =

- Directed by: Jang Yong-woo
- Written by: Inoue Yumiko
- Produced by: Choi Ho-sung; Shin Hyun-taek
- Starring: T.O.P; Seungri; Heo Yi-jae
- Cinematography: Choi Yoon-man
- Production company: Samhwa Networks
- Distributed by: CJ Entertainment
- Release date: November 12, 2009
- Running time: 103 minutes
- Countries: South Korea; Japan
- Language: Korean
- Budget: ₩1 billion

19-Nineteen (Korean: 나의 19세; lit. "I'm 19 years old") is a 2009 South Korean-Japanese crime drama film starring T.O.P, Seungri, and Heo Yi-jae. The film follows three nineteen-year-olds, two boys and a girl, are accused of murder and forced to run away. Everyone, including their parents, believes they are guilty, but the experience strengthens their bond as they attempt to find the real killer and prove their innocence.

It was part of the "Telecinema7" project, seven feature-length mini-dramas which were collaborations between South Korean TV directors and Japanese TV screenwriters; the seven Korea-Japan joint productions both received a limited theater release and were broadcast on television. 19-Nineteen was first released in Korea in CGV theaters on November 12, 2009, and later aired on SBS (South Korea) and TV Asahi (Japan) in 2010.

== Plot ==
After graduating from high school, Min-seo (Seungri) fails to get into college. He spends the next year cramming for his entrance exam once again. Jung-hoon (T.O.P) is a university student fresh out of high school. Late one evening, a high school girl dies. Earlier that evening, Min-seo filmed the girl in an internet cafe without her knowing. Min-seo, Jung-hoon, and another girl named Eun-young (Huh E-jae) – who went to the same high school as the dead girl – all become murder suspects in the death of that girl. All three of these young suspects are nineteen years old. They don't know each other, but quickly become fugitives from the law. To clear their names, they work to uncover the truth behind the girl's death.

== Cast ==
- T.O.P as Seo Jung-hoon
- Seungri as Park Min-seo
- Heo Yi-jae as Cha Eun-young
- Kim Young-ho as Kim Ha-neul
- Lee Young-beom as Ryu Seon-jae
- Jung Sung-il as Ha Ki-sang
- Shin Min-hee as Oh Young-ae
- Maeng Bong-hak as Seo Chang-man
- Oh Jung-won as Seo In-sook
- Kim Ri-na as Seo Hyang-ja
- Choi In-sook as Park Hwa-jung
- Shin Young-jin as Cha Min-kyung
- Jang So-yeon as Yoo Eun-hye

== Theme Song ==
- T.O.P ft Seungri - "Because"

== See also ==
- The Relation of Face, Mind and Love
- Heaven's Postman
- Triangle
- Paradise
- After the Banquet
- A Dream Comes True
