= Woman of Matchless Beauty, Park Jung-geum =

- Promotional poster
- Also known as: Park Jung-geum, Heavenly Beauty; Beauty Unmatched, Park Jung-geum; The Unique Park Jung-geum; Woman of Matchless Beauty
- Hangul: 천하일색 박정금
- RR: Cheonhailsaek Bak Jeonggeum
- MR: Ch'ŏnhailsaek Pak Chŏnggŭm
- Written by: Ha Chung-ok
- Directed by: Lee Hyung-seon
- Starring: Bae Jong-ok; Son Chang-min; Kim Min-jong; Han Go-eun
- Country of origin: South Korea
- Original language: Korean
- No. of episodes: 52

Production
- Producer: Lee Eun-kyu
- Running time: 60 minutes
- Production companies: MBC Production; EM Media

Original release
- Network: Munhwa Broadcasting Corporation
- Release: February 2 – August 3, 2008

Woman of Matchless Beauty, Park Jung-geum (Korean: 천하일색 박정금; also known as Park Jung-geum, Heavenly Beauty) is a 2008 South Korean television drama starring Bae Jong-ok, Son Chang-min, Kim Min-jong and Han Go-eun. The series aired on MBC from February 2 to August 3, 2008 on Saturdays and Sundays at 19:55 for 52 episodes.

== Plot ==
Park Jung-geum is far from what is conventionally considered "beautiful." She is a tough, uncompromising detective who investigates and arrests violent criminals. At the same time, she is a 38-year-old divorcee and single mother who is raising her son. Jung-geum becomes caught between two men—Yong-joon, an unmarried doctor who was her friend from elementary school, and Gyung-soo, a lawyer who is the fiancé of Jung-geum's glamorous stepsister Yoo-ra.

== Cast ==
Main characters

- Bae Jong-ok as Park Jung-geum
- Son Chang-min as Jung Yong-joon
- Kim Min-jong as Han Gyung-soo
- Han Go-eun as Sagong Yoo-ra

Supporting characters

- Lee Hye-sook as Sa Soon-ja (Yoo-ra's mother)
- Park Geun-hyung as Park Bong-pil
- Han Soo-yeon as Park Jung-sook
- Song Ok-sook as Cha Kwang-soon
- Park Jun-gyu as Jung Yong-doo
- Na Moon-hee as Yoon Myung-ja (Jung-geum's mother)
- Lee Seung-hyung as Hwang Byung-pal
- Baek Jong-min as Oh Ji-hoon (Jung-geum's eldest son)
- Kim Hak-joon as Oh Se-hoon (Jung-geum's second son)
- Jo Kyung-hoon as Detective Jang
- Kim Myung-kook as Squad Leader Choi
- Kang Suk-jung as Detective Kim
- So Do-bi as Detective Jo
- Kim Mi-ra as Sergeant Kim
- Bae Soo-bin as Detective
- Kim Yoo-hyun as Min-ji
- Im Yoon-ah as Mi-ae (guest appearance - ep 19, 20, 23)
- Ahn Jae-hong
- Kim Young-min
- Seo Hyun
- Seung Kyu

== Awards ==
2008 MBC Drama Awards

- Top Excellence Award, Actress: Bae Jong-ok
- Golden Acting Award, Actor in a Serial Drama: Park Geun-hyung
