= Last Scandal =

- Also known as: My Life's Last Scandal; Last Romance
- Genre: Romance; Comedy; Drama
- Written by: Moon Hee-jung
- Directed by: Lee Tae-gon
- Starring: Choi Jin-sil; Jung Joon-ho
- Country of origin: South Korea
- Original language: Korean
- No. of episodes: 16

Production
- Executive producers: Choi Yi-seob; Kim Hyun-jung; Lee Jang-soo
- Producer: Oh Nam-suk
- Production company: Logos Film

Original release
- Network: MBC TV
- Release: March 8 – April 27, 2008

Last Scandal (Korean: 내 생애 마지막 스캔들; RR: Nae saengae majimak seukaendeul; lit. 'The Last Scandal of My Life') is a 2008 South Korean television drama series broadcast by MBC TV. Directed by Lee Tae-gon, it stars Choi Jin-sil, Jung Joon-ho, Jung Woong-in and Byun Jung-soo. It aired from March 8 to April 27, 2008 on Saturdays and Sundays at 21:40 for 16 episodes, and was replaced by Bitter Sweet Life.

A romantic dramedy about a 39-year-old housewife who finds love with a top actor after a painful divorce, it was a modest hit on the small screen, with its final episode recording a 19.5% viewership rating.

== Plot ==
Hong Sun-hee (Choi Jin-sil) is a 39-year-old housewife facing extreme financial difficulties due to her husband Ahn Yoo-shik's (Kim Byung-se) mounting debt. One day, Yoo-shik disappears, leaving Sun-hee to take care of the household. She later learns that he has married a rich woman. Now a single divorced mother with a thirteen-year-old daughter, Sun-hee runs into top actor Song Jae-bin (Jung Joon-ho) at a commercial shoot, and he turns out to be none other than her first boyfriend, Jang Dong-chul. Sun-hee was once the prettiest girl in high school, but in the years since she has let herself go and is now a middle-aged, plain-looking housewife, which is why Jae-bin doesn't recognize her at first. Greatly disappointed to find his first love so much changed, the egoistic, self-absorbed actor tries to avoid her. But the famous star is not without problems, either. To maintain his popularity, he deceives people about his age, background, history and even his name. Little wonder he is embarrassed to meet Sun-hee again, who knows all about his past. But Jae-bin's feelings change when Sun-hee moves into his home as a housekeeper and nanny to his nephew Hoon, son of his older brother and manager Dong-hwa (Jung Woong-in) and estranged from the boy's mother, Lee Na-yoon (Byun Jung-soo). At first alternately ignoring and teasing her, Jae-bin finds himself growing jealous when Sun-hee gets along with Dong-hwa, who unlike him, is gentle, kind and mature. Reminiscing about the good old days, Jae-bin recalls how beautiful Sun-hee was when they fell in love with each other 20 years ago. And in the present, he feels happy and relaxed with her, since he can be perfectly honest in front of her as an ordinary man, not as a famous actor who has to put on a show for the public. Thus, Jae-bin falls in love with Sun-hee all over again. He tries to show her in little ways: by having a hairstylist straighten out her unflattering perm into a stylish bob cut, buying her some nice clothes, and even paying for her laser eye surgery so that she'll be able to take off her thick, horn-rimmed glasses. But more than restoring her outer beauty, he also hopes to heal her emotional scars.

== Cast ==
=== Main characters ===
- Choi Jin-sil as Hong Sun-hee
- Jung Joon-ho as Jang Dong-chul/Song Jae-bin
- Jung Woong-in as Jang Dong-hwa
- Byun Jung-soo as Lee Na-yoon

=== Supporting characters ===
- Kim Byung-se as Ahn Yoo-shik
- Han Bo-bae as Ahn Ji-min, Sun-hee's daughter
- Kim Hyung-ja as Jung Geum-ja
- Kim Chung as Go Jung-sook
- Lee Young-ja as Min-joo's mother
- Uhm Soo-jung as Ahn Yoo-jung
- Ahn Il-kwon as Seo Won-tak
- Lee Sang-hoon^{1} as Soo-ho
- Hwang Jung-eum as Sa Ruby
- Lee In-sung as Jang Hoon, Dong-hwa's son
- Choi Jung-yoon as Kim Min-hee (cameo, ep 16)
- Kim Mi-jin

== Production ==
"Ajumma" is the Korean word for a middle-aged, married women (usually housewives), and they were previously portrayed on the small and big screen as unfashionable, aggressive or hot-tempered, and self-sacrificing. Screenwriter Moon Hee-jung said the heroine she wrote was positive – Sun-hee is hardworking, brave and intelligent – because "the spiritedness of modern ajumma does not just include rebelling against their mothers-in-law. They contain a progressive spirit." Calling the series a "trendy ajumma drama," director Lee Tae-gon said that he wanted to portray "the romance of people who believe their good days are over."

Lead actress Choi Jin-sil had once been the darling of Korean popular culture during the late 1980s through the 1990s, but a controversial marriage and divorce forced her into a five-year hiatus from acting, until she made a successful comeback with My Rosy Life in 2005. The role resurrected her career and reinvented her image into a more approachable ajumma. At the drama press conference, Choi said, "As an actress, it may be natural to want a role that is glamorous and pretty, but I'm more comfortable with acting as an ordinary person. Reality is an important factor in dramas, and so I wanted to portray the life of a real person. I am an ajumma myself. I think Korean ajumma are fearless. They are not afraid of anything. Although the character goes through emotional downfalls, she doesn't give up. I think it is courage that defines ajumma."

In a December 2009 interview, actor Jung Joon-ho admitted that it was Choi Jin-sil who convinced him to take the role. He had initially passed on the role, but Choi personally went to one of his filming locations and told him that she wanted to collaborate with him in this drama. Touched by her sincerity, Jung accepted the offer. And when the first episode received ratings much lower than what both stars had expected, Choi comforted Jung, telling him not to lose hope, saying they would start from the bottom and work their way up. (After several episodes, the ratings did increase.) Jung said that Choi had a positive influence on the production, and working with her on this series left him the deepest and most unforgettable memories in his acting career.

== Reception ==
Last Scandal recorded fairly successful ratings in the 19 percent range. Fans coined a new term: "jumderella syndrome," a portmanteau of the words ajumma and Cinderella, describing the onscreen fantasy that an ajumma can still be Cinderella and live happily ever after with her Prince Charming. Despite some criticism of Sun-hee's unrealistic transformation from a dowdy housewife, the ratings reflected that the story of an ajumma having a second chance at romance found resonance among viewers, especially middle-aged women.

Because of the series' success, a second season was planned with Choi and Jung reprising their roles, which would have begun filming in November 2008. However, Choi committed suicide on October 2, 2008.

While accepting his award for Top Excellence in Acting at the MBC Drama Awards ceremony in December 2008, Jung Joon-ho spoke in a melancholy tone as he expressed his heartfelt thanks to the production crew. He dedicated his award to the late Choi Jin-sil, saying he really wished he could see the smile on her face. Choi posthumously received the Best Contribution Award, which Jung accepted on her behalf and presented to her family during a tribute to her in January 2009.

== International airing ==
- Philippines: Last Scandal aired on GMA Network from September 7 to November 6, 2009, replacing Lalola and was replaced by On Air.

== Awards and nominations ==
Year	Award	Category	Recipient	Result
2008	MBC Drama Awards	Top Excellence Award, Actor	Jung Joon-ho	Won
2008	MBC Drama Awards	Top Excellence Award, Actress	Choi Jin-sil	Nominated
2008	MBC Drama Awards	Viewer's Favorite Drama of the Year	Last Scandal	Nominated
2008	MBC Drama Awards	Best Couple Award	Jung Joon-ho and Choi Jin-sil	Nominated
2008	MBC Drama Awards	Achievement Award	Choi Jin-sil	Won
2009	45th Baeksang Arts Awards	Best Drama	Last Scandal	Nominated
2009	45th Baeksang Arts Awards	Best Director (TV)	Lee Tae-gon	Nominated
2009	45th Baeksang Arts Awards	Best Screenplay (TV)	Moon Hee-jung	Nominated

== Trivia ==
Four of the actors, Jung Joon-ho, Jung Woong-in, Lee In-sung, and Lee Soo-ho, also appear together in the 2009 film City of Damnation.

== Notes ==
- ^{1}Credited as Lee Soo-ho.
