= Kim Ho-seong =

South Korean voice actor (1969–2021)

Kim Ho-seong (Korean: 김호성; September 7, 1969 – May 18, 2021) was a South Korean voice actor who joined the Munhwa Broadcasting Corporation's voice acting division in 1996. He was cast in the Korea TV Edition of CSI: Crime Scene Investigation as Grec Sanders, replacing Eric Szmanda.

== Roles ==
=== Broadcast TV ===
- CSI: Crime Scene Investigation (replacing Eric Szmanda, Korea TV Edition, MBC)
- Smallville (replacing Sam Jones III, Korea TV Edition, MBC)
- Fullmetal Alchemist (Korea TV Edition, AniOne)

=== Film dubbing ===
- Ghost World (replacing Steve Buscemi, Korea TV Edition, MBC)
- Bad Boys II (replacing Will Smith, Korea TV Edition, MBC)

== See also ==
- Munhwa Broadcasting Corporation
- MBC Voice Acting Division
