= List of Singing Battle episodes =

This is a list of Singing Battle episodes.

– Contestant is instantly eliminated by 13 judges (received less than or equal to 6 votes)
– Contestant advances to the next round
Contestant in italic hasn't performed in their round and was replaced by their team's hidden card
Contestant who has * right next their name is a hidden card
Contestant who has ** right next their name is an early loser, so they have to perform for the revival

== Pilot ==
- Team Yoon Jong-shin: Hwang Seok-jeong, Son Ho-young (g.o.d), Kim Soo-yong
- Team Yoon Do-hyun: Han Sang-heon, Gong Se-young, Moon Ji-ae
- Team Jung Jae-hyung: Dong Hyun-bae, Choi Yoon-young, Lee Joo-seung
  - Uhm Hyun-kyung appeared in Jaehyung team but she hasn't performed.
- Team Kim Hyung-seok: Sunwoo Jae-duk, Im Hyung-joon, Kwon Hyuk-soo
- Team Lee Sang-min: Moon Se-yoon, Lee Yong-jin, Kim Hee-won
Result

Air date	Round	Team/Contestant					Song	Original artist
Air date	Round	Jongshin	Dohyun	Jaehyung	Hyungseok	Sangmin	Song	Original artist
September 16, 2016	1	Kim Soo-yong (3)	Han Sang-heon (10)	—	—	—	Running in the Sky (하늘을 달리다)	Lee Juck
September 16, 2016	2	—	Han Sang-heon (8)	Dong Hyun-bae (5)	—	—	If by Chance (만약에 말야)	Jeon Woo-sung
September 16, 2016	3	—	Han Sang-heon (3)	—	Im Hyung-joon (10)	—	Short Hair (단발머리)	Cho Yong-pil
September 16, 2016	4	—	—	Lee Joo-seung (0)	Im Hyung-joon (7)	—	Last Love (끝사랑)	Kim Bum-soo
September 16, 2016	5	—	—	—	Im Hyung-joon (3)	Kim Hee-won (10)	Nagging (잔소리)	IU & Lim Seul-ong
September 16, 2016	6	—	Moon Ji-ae; Ali* (10)	—	—	Kim Hee-won (3)	Childish Adult (어른아이)	Gummy
September 16, 2016	7	—	Moon Ji-ae (4)	—	—	Moon Se-yoon (9)	All For You	Cool
September 16, 2016	8	—	—	—	Sunwoo Jae-duk; JeA* (Brown Eyed Girls) (6)	Moon Se-yoon; Huh Gak* (7)	Scar Deeper Than Love (사랑보다 깊은 상처)	Yim Jae-beom & Lena Park
September 16, 2016	9	—	—	—	Kwon Hyuk-soo (7)	Moon Se-yoon (0)	It's Only My World (그것만이 내 세상)	Deulgukhwa
September 16, 2016	10	—	—	—	Kwon Hyuk-soo (8)	Lee Yong-jin (5)	People Who Make Me Sorrow (나를 슬프게 하는 사람들)	Kim Kyung-ho
September 16, 2016	11	Hwang Seok-jeong; Sandeul* (B1A4) (8)	—	—	Kwon Hyuk-soo (5)	All-killed	If You're Like Me (나와 같다면)	Kim Jang-hoon
September 16, 2016	12	Hwang Seok-jeong (9)	Gong Se-young (4)	—	All-killed	All-killed	To J (J에게)	Lee Sun-hee
September 16, 2016	13	Hwang Seok-jeong (5)	All-killed	Choi Yoon-young (8)	All-killed	All-killed	Tell Me	Wonder Girls
September 16, 2016	14	Son Hoyoung (6)	All-killed	Choi Yoon-young; Na Yoon-kwon* (7)	All-killed	All-killed	Love Has Gone (사랑했지만)	Kim Kwang-seok
September 16, 2016	Result	Jaehyung team won						

== 1st Game (Episodes 1–2) ==
- Team Lee Sang-min: Hwang Seok-jeong, Im Hyung-joon, Song Jae-hee
- Team Kim Su-ro: Kim Beop-rae, Won Ki-joon, Bae Da-hae
- Team Yang Dong-geun: Park Kyung-lim, Park Seung-geon (박승건), Park Seul-gi
- Team JK Kim Dong-wook: Ahn Yoon-sang, Kim Tae-won, Kim Hee-won
Result

Air date	Round	Team/Contestant				Song	Original artist
Air date	Round	Sangmin	Suro	Donggeun	JK	Song	Original artist
October 21, 2016; October 28, 2016	1	Song Jae-hee (9)	—	—	Kim Tae-won (4)	Don't Give Up (포기하지마)	Sung Jin-woo
October 21, 2016; October 28, 2016	2	Song Jae-hee (3)	Won Ki-joon (10)	—	—	A Shot of Soju (소주한잔)	Im Chang-jung
October 21, 2016; October 28, 2016	3	—	Won Ki-joon (9)	—	Ahn Yoon-sang (4)	This Is the Moment (Korean version) (지금 이 순간)	Musical Jekyll and Hyde OST
October 21, 2016; October 28, 2016	4	—	Won Ki-joon; JeA* (Brown Eyed Girls) (6)	Park Seul-gi (7)	—	Bruise (멍)	Kim Hyun-jung
October 21, 2016; October 28, 2016	5	Hwang Seok-jeong (11)	—	Park Seul-gi; Sojung* (Ladies' Code) (2)	—	Thick Lipstick (립스틱 짙게 바르고)	Im Joo-ri
October 21, 2016; October 28, 2016	6	Hwang Seok-jeong (8)	—	Park Kyung-lim (5)	—	Violet Fragrance (보라빛향기)	Kang Susie
October 21, 2016; October 28, 2016	7	Hwang Seok-jeong; Kim Hyun-sung* (5)	—	—	Kim Hee-won; Lee Ki-chan* (8)	I'm Sorry (미안해요)	Kim Gun-mo
October 21, 2016; October 28, 2016	8	Im Hyung-joon	—	—	Kim Hee-won	That Man, That Woman (그 남자, 그 여자)	Vibe ft. Jang Hye-jin
October 21, 2016; October 28, 2016	9	All-killed	Kim Beop-rae (7)	—	Kim Hee-won (6)	I Have a Lover (애인 있어요)	Lee Eun-mi
October 21, 2016; October 28, 2016	10	All-killed	Kim Beop-rae (6)	Park Seung-geon (7)	All-killed	Last Concert (마지막 콘서트)	Lee Seung-chul
October 21, 2016; October 28, 2016	11	All-killed	Bae Da-hae (7)	Park Seung-geon (0)	All-killed	The Blue in You (그대 안의 블루)	Kim Hyun-chul ft. Lee So-ra
October 21, 2016; October 28, 2016	Result	Suro team won and received the Samgyetang sets. Kim Beop-rae, Won Ki-joon and Bae Da-hae continued to perform in the next time.					

== 2nd Game (Episodes 2–3) ==
- Team Kim Hyung-seok: Kim Ji-min, Yang Se-chan, Park So-ra
- Team Lee Sang-min: Won Ki-joon, Im Hyung-joon, (Note: Due to busy schedule on musical, Kim Beop-rae couldn't attend in this time and was replaced by Im Hyung-joon.) Bae Da-hae
- Team Jo Gyu-chan: Park Jun-gyu, Jin Song-ah, Park Jong-chan
- Team Kangta: Park Na-rae, Lee Yong-jin, Lee Jin-ho
Result

Air date	Round	Team/Contestant				Song	Original artist
Air date	Round	Hyungseok	Sangmin	Gyuchan	Kangta	Song	Original artist
October 28, 2016; November 4, 2016	1	Yang Se-chan (5)	—	Park Jun-gyu (8)	—	Apartment (아파트)	Yoon Soo-il
October 28, 2016; November 4, 2016	2	—	—	Park Jun-gyu (9)	Lee Jin-ho (4)	Like Those Powerful Salmons That Come Against The River (거꾸로 강물을 거슬러오르는 저 힘찬 연어들처럼)	Kang San-ae
October 28, 2016; November 4, 2016	3	—	Im Hyung-joon (7)	Park Jun-gyu (0)	—	I'll Become Dust (먼지가 되어)	Kim Kwang-seok
October 28, 2016; November 4, 2016	4	Kim Ji-min (4)	Im Hyung-joon (9)	—	—	Miracle (기적)	Kim Dong-ryool ft. Lee So-eun
October 28, 2016; November 4, 2016	5	—	Im Hyung-joon; Changmin* (2AM) (5)	Park Jong-chan; Seomoon Tak* (8)	—	You in My Faded Memories (흐린 기억속의 그대)	Hyun Jin-young
October 28, 2016; November 4, 2016	6	—	Won Ki-joon (4)	Park Jong-chan (9)	—	Confession (고해)	Yim Jae-beom
October 28, 2016; November 4, 2016	7	—	—	Park Jong-chan (6)	Lee Yong-jin (7)	Love Rain (사랑비)	Kim Tae-woo
October 28, 2016; November 4, 2016	8	Park So-ra; Hong Kyung-min* (9)	—	—	Lee Yong-jin (4)	I'm a Butterfly (나는 나비)	YB
October 28, 2016; November 4, 2016	9	Park So-ra (0)	Bae Da-hae (7)	—	—	8282	Davichi
October 28, 2016; November 4, 2016	10	All-killed	Bae Da-hae (5)	—	Park Na-rae; Lee Hyun* (Homme) (8)	Just the Way We Love (우리 사랑 이대로)	Joo Young-hoon ft. Lee Hye-jin
October 28, 2016; November 4, 2016	11	All-killed	All-killed	Jin Song-ah (4)	Park Na-rae (9)	You Let Me Go with a Smile (미소를 띄우며 나를 보낸 그 모습처럼)	Lee Eun-ha
October 28, 2016; November 4, 2016	Result	Kangta team won and received the Han-u sets. Park Na-rae, Lee Yong-jin and Lee Jin-ho continued to perform in the next time.					

== 3rd Game (Episodes 4–5) ==
- Team Kim Hyung-seok: Go Myung-hwan, Moon Cheon-sik, Kim Mi-ryeo
- Team Kim Gwang-jin: Choo Sung-hoon, Shin Soo-ji, Jeong Da-rae
- Team Jo Gyu-chan: Park Na-rae, Lee Yong-jin, Lee Jin-ho
- Team Park Soo-hong: Seo Yu-ri, Nam Chang-hee, Jo Se-ho
Result

Air date	Round	Team/Contestant				Song	Original artist
Air date	Round	Hyungseok	Gwangjin	Gyuchan	Soohong	Song	Original artist
November 18, 2016; November 25, 2016	1	Kim Mi-ryeo (7)	Jeong Da-rae (0)	—	—	Round and Round (빙글빙글)	Na-mi
November 18, 2016; November 25, 2016	2	Kim Mi-ryeo (7)	—	—	Nam Chang-hee; Son Seung-yeon* (6)	Maria (Korean version)	Blondie
November 18, 2016; November 25, 2016	3	Kim Mi-ryeo (10)	—	—	Seo Yu-ri (3)	Beautiful Country (아름다운 강산)	Lee Sun-hee
November 18, 2016; November 25, 2016	4	Kim Mi-ryeo (1)	—	Lee Jin-ho; U Sung-eun* (12)	—	Is There Anybody? (누구없소?)	Han Young-ae
November 18, 2016; November 25, 2016	5	—	—	Lee Jin-ho (5)	Jo Se-ho (8)	In the Rain (빗속에서)	Lee Moon-se
November 18, 2016; November 25, 2016	6	—	Choo Sung-hoon (4)	—	Jo Se-ho (9)	Don't Forget (잊지 말아요)	Baek Ji-young
November 18, 2016; November 25, 2016	Revival	Kim Mi-ryeo** (5)	—	—	Nam Chang-hee** (8)	Puyo Puyo (뿌요뿌요)	UP
November 18, 2016; November 25, 2016	Revival	—	Choo Sung-hoon** (9)	Lee Jin-ho** (4)	—	No More Love Like This (그런 사람 또 없습니다)	Lee Seung-chul
November 18, 2016; November 25, 2016	7	Go Myung-hwan (7)	—	—	Jo Se-ho (6)	Prelude (서시)	Shin Sung-woo
November 18, 2016; November 25, 2016	8	Go Myung-hwan (7)	—	Park Na-rae (0)	—	Hand in Hand (손에 손 잡고) (1988 Summer Olympics theme song)	Koreana
November 18, 2016; November 25, 2016	9	Go Myung-hwan; Park Kwang-sun* (Ulala Session) (8)	—	Lee Yong-jin (5)	—	Emergency Room (응급실)	izi
November 18, 2016; November 25, 2016	10	Go Myung-hwan (3)	Choo Sung-hoon (10)	All-killed	—	Yesterday	Kim Jung-min
November 18, 2016; November 25, 2016	11	Moon Cheon-sik (5)	Choo Sung-hoon (8)	All-killed	—	One Love (하나의 사랑)	Park Sang-min
November 18, 2016; November 25, 2016	12	All-killed	Choo Sung-hoon (0)	All-killed	Nam Chang-hee (7)	Unconditional (무조건)	Park Sang-cheol
November 18, 2016; November 25, 2016	13	All-killed	Shin Soo-ji (9)	All-killed	Nam Chang-hee (4)	Safety (안부)	Byul ft. Na Yoon-kwon
November 18, 2016; November 25, 2016	Result	Gwangjin team won and received the Han-u sets.					

== 4th Game (Episodes 6–7) ==
- Team Kim Hyung-seok: Kim Min-hee, Yoon Hae-young, Jang Ki-yong
- Team Jo Gyu-chan: Kim Joon-ho, Kim Dae-hee, Hong In-gyu
- Team Lee Sang-min: Lee Yong-jin, Dong Hyun-bae, Park Jong-chan
- Team Park Soo-hong: Kwon Hyuk-soo, Ahn So-mi, Lee Se-young
Result

Air date	Round	Team/Contestant				Song	Original artist
Air date	Round	Hyungseok	Gyuchan	Sangmin	Soohong	Song	Original artist
December 2, 2016; December 9, 2016	1	—	Kim Dae-hee (3)	—	Ahn So-mi (10)	Seabirds (바다새)	Seabirds (바다새)
December 2, 2016; December 9, 2016	2	Kim Min-hee (5)	—	—	Ahn So-mi (8)	Night After Night (밤이면 밤마다)	Insooni
December 2, 2016; December 9, 2016	3	—	—	Lee Yong-jin (8)	Ahn So-mi (5)	Man and Woman (남과 여)	Park Seon-joo ft. Kim Bum-soo
December 2, 2016; December 9, 2016	4	—	—	Lee Yong-jin (4)	Kwon Hyuk-soo (9)	Lonely Night	Boohwal
December 2, 2016; December 9, 2016	5	—	Kim Joon-ho; KCM* (5)	—	Kwon Hyuk-soo (8)	Forbidden Love (금지된 사랑)	Kim Kyung-ho
December 2, 2016; December 9, 2016	Revival	—	Kim Joon-ho** (5)	Lee Yong-jin** (8)	—	Alcohol (술이야)	Vibe
December 2, 2016; December 9, 2016	Revival	Kim Min-hee** (5)	—	—	Ahn So-mi** (8)	Daring Woman (당돌한 여자)	Seo Joo-kyung
December 2, 2016; December 9, 2016	6	—	—	Park Jong-chan (9)	Kwon Hyuk-soo (4)	For You (너를 위해)	Yim Jae-beom
December 2, 2016; December 9, 2016	7	Jang Ki-yong (5)	—	Park Jong-chan (8)	—	Because You're My Girl (내 여자라니까)	Lee Seung-gi
December 2, 2016; December 9, 2016	8	—	—	Park Jong-chan (6)	Lee Se-young; Seo Young-eun* (7)	Farewell Story (이별 이야기)	Lee Moon-se
December 2, 2016; December 9, 2016	9	Yoon Hae-young; So Chan-whee* (11)	—	—	Lee Se-young (2)	I'm Yours (애모)	Kim Soo-hee
December 2, 2016; December 9, 2016	10	Yoon Hae-young (6)	—	Dong Hyun-bae (7)	—	Lying on the Sea (바다에 누워)	The Treble Clef
December 2, 2016; December 9, 2016	11	All-killed	Hong In-gyu (6)	Dong Hyun-bae (7)	—	Champion (챔피언)	Psy
December 2, 2016; December 9, 2016	12	All-killed	All-killed	Dong Hyun-bae (5)	Ahn So-mi (8)	Candy in My Ears (내 귀에 캔디)	Baek Ji-young ft. Ok Taec-yeon
December 2, 2016; December 9, 2016	13	All-killed	All-killed	Lee Yong-jin (10)	Ahn So-mi (3)	Let's Go Travel (여행을 떠나요)	Cho Yong-pil
December 2, 2016; December 9, 2016	Result	Sangmin team won and received the Han-u sets.					

== 5th Game (Episodes 8–9) ==
- Team Kim Hyung-seok: Seomoon Tak, Sojung (Ladies' Code), U Sung-eun
- Team Yoon Il-sang: Tei, Heo Young-saeng (SS501/Double S 301), Raina (After School/Orange Caramel)
- Team Jo Gyu-chan: Bae Ki-sung (CAN), Lee Ji-hye, Go Yoo-jin (Flower)
- Team Lee Sang-min: Lee Jin-sung, Mamamoo (Solar, Wheein)
Result

Air date	Round	Team/Contestant				Song	Original artist
Air date	Round	Hyungseok	Ilsang	Gyuchan	Sangmin	Song	Original artist
Singers Special; December 16, 2016; December 23, 2016	1	Seomoon Tak (8)	—	—	Wheein (5)	U&I	Ailee
Singers Special; December 16, 2016; December 23, 2016	2	Seomoon Tak (8)	—	Bae Ki-sung (5)	—	Blissful Confession (황홀한 고백)	Yoon Soo-il
Singers Special; December 16, 2016; December 23, 2016	3	Seomoon Tak (10)	—	Lee Ji-hye (3)	—	Tears	So Chan-whee
Singers Special; December 16, 2016; December 23, 2016	4	Seomoon Tak (3)	—	—	Lee Jin-sung (10)	Goodbye For a Moment (잠시만 안녕)	MC the Max
Singers Special; December 16, 2016; December 23, 2016	5	—	Tei (8)	—	Lee Jin-sung (5)	Desperado	Eagles
Singers Special; December 16, 2016; December 23, 2016	6	Sojung (10)	Tei (3)	—	—	Scars Deeper than Love (사랑보다 깊은 상처)	Yim Jae-beom ft. Lena Park
Singers Special; December 16, 2016; December 23, 2016	Revival	Seomoon Tak** (6)	—	Lee Ji-hye** (7)	—	Winter Child (겨울아이)	Lee Jong-yong (이종용)
Singers Special; December 16, 2016; December 23, 2016	Revival	—	Tei** (7)	—	Lee Jin-sung** (6)	White Winter (하얀 겨울)	Mr. 2
Singers Special; December 16, 2016; December 23, 2016	7	Sojung (4)	Raina (9)	—	—	Late Regret (늦은 후회)	Bobo
Singers Special; December 16, 2016; December 23, 2016	8	—	Raina (8)	Go Yoo-jin (5)	—	Man and Woman (남과 여)	Park Seon-joo ft. Kim Bum-soo
Singers Special; December 16, 2016; December 23, 2016	9	U Sung-eun (11)	Raina (2)	—	—	When Spring Comes (꽃 피는 봄이 오면)	BMK
Singers Special; December 16, 2016; December 23, 2016	10	U Sung-eun (7)	Heo Young-saeng (6)	—	—	Just The Way We Love (우리 사랑 이대로)	Joo Young-hoon ft. Lee Hye-jin
Singers Special; December 16, 2016; December 23, 2016	11	U Sung-eun (7)	—	—	Solar (6)	All You Need Is Love (사미인곡)	Seomoon Tak
Singers Special; December 16, 2016; December 23, 2016	12	U Sung-eun (9)	—	Lee Ji-hye (4)	All-killed	We Should've Been Friends (친구라도 될 걸 그랬어)	Gummy
Singers Special; December 16, 2016; December 23, 2016	13	U Sung-eun (7)	Tei (6)	All-killed	All-killed	Safety (안부)	Byul & Na Yoon-kwon
Singers Special; December 16, 2016; December 23, 2016	Result	Hyungseok team won and received the Han-u sets.					

== 6th Game (Episodes 10–11) ==
- Team Jo Gyu-chan: Yoon Hyung-ryul, Choi Woo-ri, Kang Dong-ho
- Team Kim Su-ro: Lee Yeon-bok, Oh Se-deuk, Lee Won-il, Bae Da-hae
- Team Park Wan-kyu: Jung Sung-ho, Jang Do-yeon, Kim Ji-min
- Team Muzie: Noh Hee-ji, Oh Seung-yoon, Seo Shin-ae
Result

Air date	Round	Team/Contestant				Song	Original artist
Air date	Round	Gyuchan	Suro	Wankyu	Muzie	Song	Original artist
December 30, 2016; January 6, 2017	1	—	—	Jang Do-yeon (8)	Noh Hee-ji (5)	I'm Your Girl	S.E.S.
December 30, 2016; January 6, 2017	2	—	Oh Se-deuk (4)	Jang Do-yeon (9)	—	I Will Not Stop (난 멈추지 않는다)	ZAM
December 30, 2016; January 6, 2017	3	Yoon Hyung-ryul (9)	—	Jang Do-yeon (4)	—	Meeting (만남)	Koyote
December 30, 2016; January 6, 2017	4	Yoon Hyung-ryul (9)	Lee Won-il; Bae Da-hae* (4)	—	—	It's Gonna Be Rolling	Park Hyo-shin & Lee So-ra
December 30, 2016; January 6, 2017	5	Yoon Hyung-ryul (3)	—	—	Oh Seung-yoon; Muzie* (10)	Shall I Love You Again? (다시 사랑한다 말할까)	Kim Dong-ryool
December 30, 2016; January 6, 2017	6	—	—	Jung Sung-ho (5)	Oh Seung-yoon (8)	As Time Goes By (세월이 가면)	Choi Ho-seop (최호섭)
December 30, 2016; January 6, 2017	Revival	Yoon Hyung-ryul** (7)	Lee Won-il** (6)	—	—	Flaming Sunset (붉은 노을)	Lee Moon-se
December 30, 2016; January 6, 2017	Revival	—	—	Jang Do-yeon** (7)	Noh Hee-ji** (6)	Dam Da Di (담다디)	Lee Tzsche
December 30, 2016; January 6, 2017	7	Choi Woo-ri (7)	—	—	Oh Seung-yoon (6)	Destiny (운명)	Travel Sketch
December 30, 2016; January 6, 2017	8	Choi Woo-ri (10)	—	Kim Ji-min (3)	—	Azalea (진달래꽃)	Maya
December 30, 2016; January 6, 2017	9	Choi Woo-ri (5)	—	—	Seo Shin-ae (8)	Singing Got Better (노래가 늘었어)	Ailee
December 30, 2016; January 6, 2017	10	—	—	Jang Do-yeon (4)	Seo Shin-ae (9)	Happy Me (행복한 나를)	Eco
December 30, 2016; January 6, 2017	11	Kang Dong-ho (9)	—	All-killed	Seo Shin-ae (4)	Sorrow (애상)	Cool
December 30, 2016; January 6, 2017	12	Kang Dong-ho (7)	Lee Yeon-bok (6)	All-killed	All-killed	Forever (영영)	Na Hoon-a
December 30, 2016; January 6, 2017	Result	Gyuchan team won and received the Han-u sets.					

== 7th Game (Episodes 12–13) ==
- Team Jo Gyu-chan: Lee Dong-yoon, Yoo Min-sang, Lee Soo-ji
- Team Park Soo-hong: NRG (Chun Myung-hoon, Noh Yoo-min), Gong Seo-young
- Team Kim Su-ro: Bang Joong-hyun, Kang Ji-sub, Ji Joo-yeon
- Team Tony An: Kim Ga-yeon, Joo Woo-jae, Sumin (Awe5omeBaby)
Result

Air date	Round	Team/Contestant				Song	Original artist
Air date	Round	Gyuchan	Soohong	Suro	Tony	Song	Original artist
January 13, 2017; January 20, 2017	1	Yoo Min-sang (7)	Chun Myung-hoon (6)	—	—	Barefoot Youth (맨발의 청춘)	Buck
January 13, 2017; January 20, 2017	2	Yoo Min-sang (7)	—	Kang Ji-sub (0)	—	Honey	Park Jin-young
January 13, 2017; January 20, 2017	3	Yoo Min-sang (6)	—	—	Sumin (7)	The Blue in You (그대안의 블루)	Kim Hyun-chul ft. Lee So-ra
January 13, 2017; January 20, 2017	4	Lee Soo-ji (4)	—	—	Sumin (9)	Chalrang Chalrang (찰랑찰랑)	Lee Ja-yeon
January 13, 2017; January 20, 2017	5	—	Noh Yoo-min; Ken* (VIXX) (8)	—	Sumin; Taeil* (Block B) (5)	Never Ending Story (네버 엔딩 스토리)	Boohwal
January 13, 2017; January 20, 2017	6	—	Noh Yoo-min (5)	—	Joo Woo-jae (8)	Can't We (안 되나요)	Wheesung
January 13, 2017; January 20, 2017	Revival	Yoo Min-sang** (5)	Chun Myung-hoon** (8)	—	—	Candy (캔디)	H.O.T.
January 13, 2017; January 20, 2017	Revival	—	—	Kang Ji-sub** (7)	Sumin** (6)	It's You (그대네요)	Sung Si-kyung & IU
January 13, 2017; January 20, 2017	7	—	—	Bang Joong-hyun (8)	Joo Woo-jae (5)	Entertainer (연예인)	Psy
January 13, 2017; January 20, 2017	8	Lee Dong-yoon (7)	—	Bang Joong-hyun (6)	—	I Loved You (사랑했어요)	Kim Hyun-sik
January 13, 2017; January 20, 2017	9	Lee Dong-yoon (7)	Chun Myung-hoon (6)	—	—	Soul Mates (천생연분)	Solid
January 13, 2017; January 20, 2017	10	Lee Dong-yoon; UJi* (BESTie) (8)	Gong Seo-young (5)	—	—	Late Regret (늦은 후회)	Bobo
January 13, 2017; January 20, 2017	11	Lee Dong-yoon (10)	All-killed	Kang Ji-sub (3)	—	Cannot Have You (가질 수 없는 너)	Bank
January 13, 2017; January 20, 2017	12	Lee Dong-yoon (10)	All-killed	Ji Joo-yeon (3)	—	In the Bus (버스 안에서)	ZAZA
January 13, 2017; January 20, 2017	13	Lee Dong-yoon (10)	All-killed	All-killed	Kim Ga-yeon (3)	3! 4!	Roo'ra
January 13, 2017; January 20, 2017	Result	Gyuchan team won and received the Ginseng sets.					

== 8th Game (Episodes 14–15) ==
- Team Park Soo-hong (KBS Announcers' team): Choi Seung-don, Lee Jeong-min, Han Sang-heon
- Team Kim Su-ro (Actors' team): Kang Sung-jin, Kim San-ho, Lee Soo-min
- Team Kim Jong-min (Singers' team): Chun Myung-hoon, Im Hyung-joon, Lee Ji-hye
- Team Muzie (Global team): Sayuri Fujita, Daniel Lindemann, Greg Priester
Result

Air date	Round	Team/Contestant				Song	Original artist
Air date	Round	Soohong	Suro	Jongmin	Muzie	Song	Original artist
January 27, 2017; February 3, 2017 (Seollal Special)	1	Han Sang-heon (8)	Kim San-ho (5)	—	—	You're the Only One (오직 하나뿐인 그대)	Shim Shin
January 27, 2017; February 3, 2017 (Seollal Special)	2	Han Sang-heon (9)	—	Im Hyung-joon (4)	—	A Goose's Dream (거위의 꿈)	Carnival
January 27, 2017; February 3, 2017 (Seollal Special)	3	Han Sang-heon (5)	—	—	Daniel Lindemann; Seo Eunkwang* (BtoB) (8)	Malri Flower (말리꽃)	Lee Seung-chul
January 27, 2017; February 3, 2017 (Seollal Special)	4	—	Kang Sung-jin (11)	—	Daniel Lindemann (2)	Snail (달팽이) (Lee Juck version)	Panic
January 27, 2017; February 3, 2017 (Seollal Special)	5	—	Kang Sung-jin; Luna* (f(x)) (6)	—	Greg Priester (7)	Farewell Under the Sun (대낮에 한 이별)	Park Jin-young & Sunye
January 27, 2017; February 3, 2017 (Seollal Special)	6	—	—	Chun Myung-hoon (5)	Greg Priester (8)	With Me	Wheesung
January 27, 2017; February 3, 2017 (Seollal Special)	7	Choi Seung-don; Bae Ki-sung* (CAN) (11)	—	—	Greg Priester (2)	After This Night (이 밤이 지나면)	Yim Jae-beom
January 27, 2017; February 3, 2017 (Seollal Special)	Revival	—	Kang Sung-jin** (9)	Im Hyung-joon** (4)	—	Spring Days of My Life (내 생에 봄날은)	CAN
January 27, 2017; February 3, 2017 (Seollal Special)	Revival	Han Sang-heon** (10)	—	—	Greg Priester** (3)	Moon of Seoul (서울의 달)	Kim Gun-mo
January 27, 2017; February 3, 2017 (Seollal Special)	8	Choi Seung-don (5)	Kang Sung-jin (8)	—	—	Feeling Only You (너만을 느끼며)	The Blue
January 27, 2017; February 3, 2017 (Seollal Special)	9	—	Kang Sung-jin (5)	—	Sayuri Fujita (8)	Swallowtail (호랑나비)	Kim Heung-gook
January 27, 2017; February 3, 2017 (Seollal Special)	10	Han Sang-heon (11)	—	—	Sayuri Fujita (2)	Gimbap (김밥)	The Jadu
January 27, 2017; February 3, 2017 (Seollal Special)	11	Han Sang-heon (0)	—	Lee Ji-hye (7)	All-killed	Sad Dream (비몽)	Koyote
January 27, 2017; February 3, 2017 (Seollal Special)	12	Lee Jeong-min (3)	—	Lee Ji-hye (10)	All-killed	The Pierrot Laughs at Us (삐에로는 우릴 보고 웃지)	Kim Wan-sun
January 27, 2017; February 3, 2017 (Seollal Special)	13	All-killed	Lee Soo-min (8)	Lee Ji-hye (5)	All-killed	Why Are You Calling (왜 불러)	DIVA
January 27, 2017; February 3, 2017 (Seollal Special)	Result	Suro team won and received the Han-u & Ginseng sets.					

== 9th Game (Episodes 16–17) ==
- Team Park Soo-hong: Nam Kyung-joo, Kim Seon-kyung, Kim Kyung-seon (김경선)
- Team Kim Su-ro: Kim Ho-young (김호영), Jang Eun-ah, Min Woo-hyuk
- Team Lee Sang-min: Kim Beop-rae, Kim Soo-yong, Yoon Hyung-ryul
- Team Muzie: Lisa, Jo Kwon (2AM), Leo (VIXX)
Result

Air date	Round	Team/Contestant				Song	Original artist
Air date	Round	Soohong	Suro	Sangmin	Muzie	Song	Original artist
February 10, 2017; February 17, 2017 ("Musical Star Wars" Special)	Special	All contestants				One Day More (내일로)	Musical Les Misérables OST
February 10, 2017; February 17, 2017 ("Musical Star Wars" Special)	1	—	—	Kim Soo-yong (9)	Leo (4)	Show	Kim Won-jun
February 10, 2017; February 17, 2017 ("Musical Star Wars" Special)	2	—	Min Woo-hyuk (11)	Kim Soo-yong (2)	—	Shabang Shabang (샤방 샤방)	Park Hyun-bin
February 10, 2017; February 17, 2017 ("Musical Star Wars" Special)	3	Nam Kyung-joo (6)	Min Woo-hyuk (7)	—	—	Last Love (끝사랑)	Kim Bum-soo
February 10, 2017; February 17, 2017 ("Musical Star Wars" Special)	4	—	Min Woo-hyuk (2)	Yoon Hyung-ryul (11)	—	The Sky in the West (서쪽 하늘)	Lee Seung-chul
February 10, 2017; February 17, 2017 ("Musical Star Wars" Special)	5	—	—	Yoon Hyung-ryul (3)	Lisa (10)	Endless Love	Lionel Richie & Diana Ross
February 10, 2017; February 17, 2017 ("Musical Star Wars" Special)	6	Kim Seon-kyung (11)	—	—	Lisa (2)	Faraway My Honey (님은 먼 곳에)	Kim Choo-ja
February 10, 2017; February 17, 2017 ("Musical Star Wars" Special)	Revival	Nam Kyung-joo** (7)	Min Woo-hyuk** (6)	—	—	This Is the Moment (Korean version) (지금 이 순간)	Musical Jekyll and Hyde OST
February 10, 2017; February 17, 2017 ("Musical Star Wars" Special)	Revival	—	—	Kim Soo-yong** (6)	Leo** (7)	One Candle (촛불하나)	g.o.d
February 10, 2017; February 17, 2017 ("Musical Star Wars" Special)	7	Kim Seon-kyung (8)	—	Kim Beop-rae (5)	—	If I Leave (나 가거든)	Sumi Jo
February 10, 2017; February 17, 2017 ("Musical Star Wars" Special)	Special	Kim Beop-rae & Kim Soo-yong & Yoon Hyung-ryul				The Age of the Cathedrals (대성당들의 시대)	Musical Notre-Dame de Paris OST
February 10, 2017; February 17, 2017 ("Musical Star Wars" Special)	8	Kim Seon-kyung (4)	Jang Eun-ah (9)	All-killed	—	Rose of Betrayal (배반의 장미)	Uhm Jung-hwa
February 10, 2017; February 17, 2017 ("Musical Star Wars" Special)	9	Kim Kyung-seon (5)	Jang Eun-ah (8)	All-killed	—	I Love You (난 널 사랑해)	Shin Hyo-beom
February 10, 2017; February 17, 2017 ("Musical Star Wars" Special)	10	—	Jang Eun-ah (5)	All-killed	Jo Kwon (8)	Sonata of Temptation (유혹의 소나타)	Ivy
February 10, 2017; February 17, 2017 ("Musical Star Wars" Special)	11	—	Kim Ho-young (2)	All-killed	Jo Kwon (11)	Wa (와)	Lee Jung-hyun
February 10, 2017; February 17, 2017 ("Musical Star Wars" Special)	12	Nam Kyung-joo (10)	All-killed	All-killed	Jo Kwon (3)	Love is Leaving (사랑이 떠나가네)	Kim Gun-mo
February 10, 2017; February 17, 2017 ("Musical Star Wars" Special)	13	Nam Kyung-joo (9)	All-killed	All-killed	Leo (4)	Shabang Shabang (샤방 샤방)	Park Hyun-bin
February 10, 2017; February 17, 2017 ("Musical Star Wars" Special)	Result	Soohong team won and received the Ginseng sets.					

== 10th Game (Episodes 18–19) ==
- Team Park Soo-hong: Park Kyung-lim, Kim In-seok, Son Heon-soo
- Team Kim Su-ro: Yoon Hyung-bin, Kim Ho-young (김호영), Kang Dong-ho
- Team Lee Sang-min: Jang Joo-hee, Kim Ji-hyo, Kang Ah-rang
- Team Muzie: Hwang Seung-eon, Hwang So-hee, Jang Ki-yong
Result

Air date	Round	Team/Contestant				Song	Original artist
Air date	Round	Soohong	Suro	Sangmin	Muzie	Song	Original artist
February 24, 2017; March 3, 2017	1	Kim In-seok (7)	Kang Dong-ho (6)	—	—	Nest (둥지)	Nam Jin
February 24, 2017; March 3, 2017	2	Kim In-seok (5)	Yoon Hyung-bin (8)	—	—	Mona Lisa (모나리자)	Cho Yong-pil
February 24, 2017; March 3, 2017	3	Son Heon-soo (2)	Yoon Hyung-bin (11)	—	—	Love over Thousand Years (천년의 사랑)	Park Wan-kyu
February 24, 2017; March 3, 2017	4	—	Yoon Hyung-bin (7)	Kim Ji-hyo; Huh Gak* (6)	—	Footsteps (발걸음)	Emerald Castle
February 24, 2017; March 3, 2017	5	—	Yoon Hyung-bin (3)	—	Hwang So-hee; Sejeong* (Gugudan/I.O.I) (10)	Cold Noodles (냉면)	Myung-ca Drive
February 24, 2017; March 3, 2017	6	Park Kyung-lim (10)	—	—	Hwang So-hee (3)	Is Anyone There? (누구 없소)	Han Young-ae
February 24, 2017; March 3, 2017	Revival	Son Heon-soo** (3)	Kang Dong-ho** (10)	—	—	Behind You (너의 뒤에서)	Park Jin-young
February 24, 2017; March 3, 2017	Revival	—	—	Kim Ji-hyo** (6)	Hwang So-hee** (7)	Poison (포이즌)	Uhm Jung-hwa
February 24, 2017; March 3, 2017	7	Park Kyung-lim; Park Sang-min* (11)	Kang Dong-ho (2)	—	—	Addicted Love (중독된 사랑)	Jo Jang-hyuk
February 24, 2017; March 3, 2017	8	Park Kyung-lim (10)	—	Kang Ah-rang (3)	—	Romantic Cat (낭만 고양이)	Cherry Filter
February 24, 2017; March 3, 2017	9	Park Kyung-lim (3)	—	—	Hwang Seung-eon (10)	Forever Love (영원한 사랑)	Fin.K.L
February 24, 2017; March 3, 2017	10	All-killed	—	Jang Joo-hee (4)	Hwang Seung-eon (9)	Musical (뮤지컬)	Sang A Im-Propp
February 24, 2017; March 3, 2017	11	All-killed	Kim Ho-young (13)	All-killed	Hwang Seung-eon (0)	Love Battery (사랑의 배터리)	Hong Jin-young
February 24, 2017; March 3, 2017	12	All-killed	Kim Ho-young (2)	All-killed	Jang Ki-yong (11)	Endless	Flower
February 24, 2017; March 3, 2017	Result	Muzie team won and received the Ginseng sets.					

== 11th Game (Episodes 20–21) ==
- Team Park Soo-hong: Lee Sang-hoon, Lee Se-jin, Oh Na-mi
- Team Kim Su-ro: Woo Ji-won, Ha Tae-kwon, Choi Byung-chul
- Team Lee Sang-min: Hwang Seok-jeong, Ryoo Sang-wook, Ahn Se-ha
  - Special appearance by Ryoo Sang-wook's girlfriend, actress Kim Hye-jin
- Team Muzie: Lee Jang-won, So Yeon, Park Ji-yoon
Result

Air date	Round	Team/Contestant				Song	Original artist
Air date	Round	Soohong	Suro	Sangmin	Muzie	Song	Original artist
March 17, 2017; March 24, 2017	1	—	Choi Byung-chul (6)	Ryoo Sang-wook (7)	—	Shaky Friendship (흔들린 우정)	Hong Kyung-min
March 17, 2017; March 24, 2017	2	Lee Se-jin (10)	—	Ryoo Sang-wook (3)	—	Beautiful Restriction (아름다운 구속)	Kim Jong-seo
March 17, 2017; March 24, 2017	3	Lee Se-jin (2)	—	—	Lee Jang-won (11)	I Know (난 알아요)	Seo Taiji and Boys
March 17, 2017; March 24, 2017	4	Lee Sang-hoon (11)	—	—	Lee Jang-won (2)	Ddaeng Beol (땡벌)	Kang Jin
March 17, 2017; March 24, 2017	5	Lee Sang-hoon; Lee Hyuk* (7)	Woo Ji-won; KCM* (6)	—	—	The Love I Committed (내가 저지른 사랑)	Im Chang-jung
March 17, 2017; March 24, 2017	6	Lee Sang-hoon (1)	—	Hwang Seok-jeong (12)	—	Sparks (불티)	Jeon Young-rok
March 17, 2017; March 24, 2017	Revival	Lee Se-jin** (13)	—	—	Lee Jang-won** (0)	Run to You	DJ DOC
March 17, 2017; March 24, 2017	Revival	—	Woo Ji-won** (6)	Ryoo Sang-wook** (7)	—	After Breaking Up (헤어진 후에)	Y2K
March 17, 2017; March 24, 2017	7	Oh Na-mi (6)	—	Hwang Seok-jeong (7)	—	Like an Indian Doll (인디언 인형처럼)	Na-mi
March 17, 2017; March 24, 2017	8	—	—	Hwang Seok-jeong (4)	Park Ji-yoon (9)	Fate (인연)	Lee Sun-hee
March 17, 2017; March 24, 2017	9	—	Ha Tae-kwon (4)	—	Park Ji-yoon (9)	Well Done, Great Job (잘했군 잘했어)	Ha Choon-hwa & Go Bong-san (고봉산)
March 17, 2017; March 24, 2017	Special	Muzie team members				Love Is an Open Door (사랑은 열린 문) (Korean version)	Park Ji-yoon & Yoon Seung-wook
March 17, 2017; March 24, 2017	10	—	All-killed	Ahn Se-ha (7)	Park Ji-yoon (6)	Grabber (욕심쟁이)	Kim Dong-ryool ft. Lee So-eun
March 17, 2017; March 24, 2017	11	—	All-killed	Ahn Se-ha; Ben* (11)	So Yeon (2)	Snow Flower (눈의 꽃)	Park Hyo-shin
March 17, 2017; March 24, 2017	12	Lee Se-jin (2)	All-killed	Ahn Se-ha (11)	All-killed	Is It Still Beautiful (여전히 아름다운지)	Toy
March 17, 2017; March 24, 2017	Result	Sangmin team won and received the Ginseng sets.					

== 12th Game (Episodes 22–23) ==
Actor Teams

- Team Park Soo-hong: Moon Hee-kyung, Jang Seok-hyun, Kim Hye-seong
- Team Park Kyung-lim: Kwon Tae-won, Jo Deok-hyun, Maeng Se-chang

Comedian Teams

- Team Lee Sang-min: Jo Young-goo, Kim Hak-do, Ahn So-mi
- Team Muzie: Son Heon-soo, Hong Yoon-hwa, Kim Ji-min
Result

Air date	Round	Team/Contestant				Song	Original artist
Air date	Round	Actors Team		Comedians Team		Song	Original artist
Air date	Round	Soohong (yellow card)	Kyunglim	Sangmin	Muzie	Song	Original artist
March 31, 2017; April 7, 2017	1	—	Maeng Se-chang (4)	Jo Young-goo (9)	—	Twist of Love (사랑의 트위스트)	Seol Woon-do
March 31, 2017; April 7, 2017	2	Moon Hee-kyung (9)	—	Jo Young-goo (4)	—	You and Me (그대 그리고 나)	Sorisae (소리새)
March 31, 2017; April 7, 2017	3	Moon Hee-kyung (8)	—	Ahn So-mi (5)	—	The Face I Miss (보고싶은 얼굴)	Min Hae-kyung
March 31, 2017; April 7, 2017	4	Moon Hee-kyung (6)	—	—	Hong Yoon-hwa; Chae Yeon* (7)	Unreasonable Reason (이유같지 않은 이유)	Park Mi-kyung
March 31, 2017; April 7, 2017	5	Kim Hye-seong; Niel* (Teen Top) (10)	—	—	Hong Yoon-hwa (3)	Place Where You Need to Be (니가 있어야 할 곳)	g.o.d
March 31, 2017; April 7, 2017	6	Kim Hye-seong (2)	—	—	Son Heon-soo (11)	Fortunately (다행이다)	Lee Juck
March 31, 2017; April 7, 2017	7	—	Jo Deok-hyun (7)	—	Son Heon-soo (6)	Don't Worry (걱정 말아요 그대)	Jeon In-kwon
March 31, 2017; April 7, 2017	8	—	Jo Deok-hyun (3)	Kim Hak-do (10)	—	Write Love with Pencil (사랑은 연필로 쓰세요)	Jeon Young-rok
March 31, 2017; April 7, 2017	Revival	—	Maeng Se-chang**	—	Hong Yoon-hwa**	Some (썸)	Soyou & Junggigo
March 31, 2017; April 7, 2017	Revival	Moon Hye-kyung** (6)	—	Ahn So-mi** (7)	—	You're the Best (넌 is 뭔들)	Mamamoo
March 31, 2017; April 7, 2017	9	—	Kwon Tae-won (6)	Kim Hak-do (7)	—	The Leopard of Mt. Kilimanjaro (킬리만자로의 표범)	Cho Yong-pil
March 31, 2017; April 7, 2017	10	—	Maeng Se-chang; Kihyun* (Monsta X) (12)	Kim Hak-do (1)	—	Love Love Love (사랑 사랑 사랑)	Kim Hyun-sik
March 31, 2017; April 7, 2017	11	Jang Seok-hyun (9)	Maeng Se-chang (4)	—	—	Honey	Park Jin-young
March 31, 2017; April 7, 2017	12	Jang Seok-hyun (8)	All-killed	Ahn So-mi (5)	—	Angel Without Wings (날개 잃은 천사)	Roo'ra
March 31, 2017; April 7, 2017	13	Jang Seok-hyun (10)	All-killed	All-killed	Kim Ji-min (3)	All for You	Cool
March 31, 2017; April 7, 2017	Result	Soohong team won and received the Ginseng and health functional foods sets.					

== 13th Game (Episodes 24–25) ==
- Team Park Soo-hong: Stephanie, Park Ji-woo, Jung Da-eun
- Team Lee Sang-min: Kim Young-ho, Kwon Min-joong, Kim Ki-doo
- Team Park Kyung-lim: Song Byung-cheol, Heo Min, Seo Tae-hoon
- Team Muzie: Dong Ji-hyun, Lee Min-woong, Lady Jane
Result

Air date	Round	Team/Contestant				Song	Original artist
Air date	Round	Soohong	Sangmin	Kyunglim	Muzie	Song	Original artist
April 14, 2017; April 21, 2017	1	—	Kim Ki-doo (10)	Song Byung-cheol (3)	—	One Flew Over the Cuckoo's Nest (뻐꾸기 둥지 위로 날아간 새)	Kim Gun-mo
April 14, 2017; April 21, 2017	2	—	Kim Ki-doo (5)	—	Lee Min-woong (8)	Don't Leave Me (날 떠나지마)	Park Jin-young
April 14, 2017; April 21, 2017	3	Park Ji-woo (11)	—	—	Lee Min-woong (2)	Walking Up to Heaven (걸어서 하늘까지)	Jang Hyeon-cheol (장현철)
April 14, 2017; April 21, 2017	4	Park Ji-woo; Sujeong* (Lovelyz) (6)	—	—	Lady Jane (7)	Magic Carpet Ride (매직 카펫 라이드)	Jaurim
April 14, 2017; April 21, 2017	5	Jung Da-eun (6)	—	—	Lady Jane (7)	A-ing (아잉♡)	Orange Caramel
April 14, 2017; April 21, 2017	6	—	—	Seo Tae-hoon (8)	Lady Jane (5)	Understanding Man And Woman (해석남녀)	Cool
April 14, 2017; April 21, 2017	Revival	Park Ji-woo** (7)	Kim Ki-doo** (6)	—	—	It's Love (사랑인 걸)	Mose
April 14, 2017; April 21, 2017	Revival	—	—	Song Byung-cheol** (3)	Lee Min-woong** (10)	HeungBo Thinks That's Bullshit (흥보가 기가 막혀)	Yukgaksu (육각수)
April 14, 2017; April 21, 2017	7	Park Ji-woo (8)	—	Seo Tae-hoon (5)	—	Thorn (가시)	BUZZ
April 14, 2017; April 21, 2017	8	Park Ji-woo (0)	—	Heo Min; Taeil* (Block B) (13)	—	Missing You	Fly to the Sky
April 14, 2017; April 21, 2017	9	—	Kwon Min-joong (5)	Heo Min (8)	—	Love Is a Cold Temptation (사랑은 차가운 유혹)	Yang Soo-kyung
April 14, 2017; April 21, 2017	10	Stephanie (11)	—	Heo Min (2)	—	Warning of the Eve (이브의 경고)	Park Mi-kyung
April 14, 2017; April 21, 2017	11	Stephanie (10)	—	All-killed	Dong Ji-hyun (3)	One's Way Back (귀로)	Park Seon-joo
April 14, 2017; April 21, 2017	12	Stephanie (5)	Kim Young-ho; U Sung-eun* (8)	All-killed	—	Listen	Beyoncé
April 14, 2017; April 21, 2017	13	All-killed	Kim Young-ho (11)	All-killed	Lee Min-woong (2)	Even If You Get Cheated by World (세상이 그대를 속일지라도)	Kim Jang-hoon
April 14, 2017; April 21, 2017	Result	Sangmin team won and received the Han-u and health functional foods sets.					

== 14th Game (Episodes 26–27) ==
- Team Park Soo-hong (Actors): Ryu Tae-joon, Park Min-ji, Heo Young-ji
- Team Lee Sang-min (Rappers): Sleepy (Untouchable), Jeon Ji-yoon, Eli Kim
- Team Park Kyung-lim (Entertainers): Nam Chang-hee, Boom, Seo Yu-ri
- Team Muzie (Gugak Musicians): Park Ae-ri, Nam Sang-il, Kim Na-ni
Result

Air date	Round	Team/Contestant				Song	Original artist
Air date	Round	Soohong	Sangmin	Kyunglim	Muzie	Song	Original artist
April 28, 2017; May 5, 2017	1	Heo Young-ji (5)	—	—	Park Ae-ri (8)	I Don't Know Anything But Love (사랑밖엔 난 몰라)	Sim Soo-bong
April 28, 2017; May 5, 2017	2	—	Jeon Ji-yoon (6)	—	Park Ae-ri (7)	I Will Give You All My Love (내게 남은 사랑을 다 줄께)	Wax
April 28, 2017; May 5, 2017	3	—	—	Seo Yu-ri; Geum Jan-di* (8)	Park Ae-ri (5)	Todays Women Todays Men (요즘 여자 요즘 남자)	Hyun Sook
April 28, 2017; May 5, 2017	4	Park Min-ji (7)	—	Seo Yu-ri (6)	—	Password 486 (비밀번호 486)	Younha
April 28, 2017; May 5, 2017	5	Park Min-ji (5)	—	Nam Chang-hee (8)	—	One and a Half (일과 이분의 일)	Two Two
April 28, 2017; May 5, 2017	6	—	Sleepy (10)	Nam Chang-hee (3)	—	You in My Faded Memories (흐린 기억 속의 그대)	Hyun Jin-young
April 28, 2017; May 5, 2017	Special	Lee Sang-min and his team				Win Win	Bros (브로스)
April 28, 2017; May 5, 2017	Revival	Heo Young-ji** (10)	—	Seo Yu-ri** (3)	—	Tell Me	Wonder Girls
April 28, 2017; May 5, 2017	Revival	—	Jeon Ji-yoon** (7)	—	Park Ae-ri** (6)	I Won't Love (사랑 안 해)	Baek Ji-young
April 28, 2017; May 5, 2017	7	Ryu Tae-joon (3)	Sleepy (10)	—	—	Toward Tomorrow (내일을 향해)	Shin Sung-woo
April 28, 2017; May 5, 2017	8	—	Sleepy; Kim Jong-seo* (7)	—	Nam Sang-il (6)	Do Not Find Oriole (못 찾겠다 꾀꼬리)	Cho Yong-pil
April 28, 2017; May 5, 2017	9	—	Sleepy (5)	Boom (8)	—	Holding the End of This Night (이 밤의 끝을 잡고)	Solid
April 28, 2017; May 5, 2017	10	Heo Young-ji (11)	—	Boom (2)	—	Candy in My Ears (내 귀에 캔디)	Baek Ji-young ft. Taecyeon
April 28, 2017; May 5, 2017	11	Heo Young-ji; Song Ji-eun* (Secret) (8)	Jeon Ji-yoon (5)	All-killed	—	Adult Child (어른 아이)	Gummy
April 28, 2017; May 5, 2017	12	Heo Young-ji (5)	—	All-killed	Kim Na-ni (8)	Adult Ceremony (성인식)	Park Ji-yoon
April 28, 2017; May 5, 2017	13	All-killed	Eli Kim (3)	All-killed	Kim Na-ni (10)	My Friend (친구여)	Cho PD ft. Insooni
April 28, 2017; May 5, 2017	Result	Muzie team won and received the Han-u and health functional foods sets.					

== 15th Game (Episodes 28–29) ==
- Team Park Soo-hong: Nam Kyung-joo, Kim Seon-kyung, Kim Kyung-seon (김경선)
- Team Lee Sang-min: Kim Seung-dae, Choi Woo-ri, Seo Kyung-soo (서경수)
- Team Park Kyung-lim: Seo Young-joo (서영주), Park Hye-na, Jang Eun-ah
- Team Muzie: Stephanie, Son Dong-woon (HIGHLIGHT), Kim Shin-eui (Monni)
Result

Air date	Round	Team/Contestant				Song	Original artist
Air date	Round	Soohong	Sangmin	Kyunglim	Muzie	Song	Original artist
May 12, 2017; May 19, 2017 ("Musical Star Wars" Special 2)	Special	All contestants				Oh Happy Day	Edwin Hawkins Singers
May 12, 2017; May 19, 2017 ("Musical Star Wars" Special 2)	1	Kim Kyung-seon (8)	—	—	Stephanie (5)	Fame	Irene Cara
May 12, 2017; May 19, 2017 ("Musical Star Wars" Special 2)	2	Kim Kyung-seon (6)	Choi Woo-ri (7)	—	—	Resignation (체념)	Big Mama
May 12, 2017; May 19, 2017 ("Musical Star Wars" Special 2)	3	—	Choi Woo-ri (4)	Jang Eun-ah (9)	—	Stained (물들어)	BMK
May 12, 2017; May 19, 2017 ("Musical Star Wars" Special 2)	4	—	Seo Kyung-soo (6)	Jang Eun-ah (7)	—	Beauty and the Beast	Celine Dion & Peabo Bryson
May 12, 2017; May 19, 2017 ("Musical Star Wars" Special 2)	5	Kim Seon-kyung (9)	—	Jang Eun-ah (4)	—	Everyone (여러분)	Yoon Bok-hee
May 12, 2017; May 19, 2017 ("Musical Star Wars" Special 2)	6	Kim Seon-kyung (7)	—	—	Kim Shin-eui (6)	Lying on the Sea (바다에 누워)	Treble Clef
May 12, 2017; May 19, 2017 ("Musical Star Wars" Special 2)	Revival	Kim Kyung-seon** (4)	—	Jang Eun-ah** (9)	—	Breakup with Her (그녀와의 이별)	Kim Hyun-jung
May 12, 2017; May 19, 2017 ("Musical Star Wars" Special 2)	Revival	—	Seo Kyung-soo** (3)	—	Kim Shin-eui** (10)	Waiting Everyday (매일 매일 기다려)	T△S (티삼스)
May 12, 2017; May 19, 2017 ("Musical Star Wars" Special 2)	7	Kim Seon-kyung (5)	—	Park Hye-na (8)	—	Memory (Korean version) (메모리)	Musical Cats OST
May 12, 2017; May 19, 2017 ("Musical Star Wars" Special 2)	Special	Park Hye-na				Let It Go (Korean version) (다 잊어)	Movie Frozen OST
May 12, 2017; May 19, 2017 ("Musical Star Wars" Special 2)	8	Nam Kyung-joo (8)	—	Park Hye-na (5)	—	A Whole New World	Movie Aladdin OST
May 12, 2017; May 19, 2017 ("Musical Star Wars" Special 2)	9	Nam Kyung-joo (7)	—	—	Son Dong-woon (6)	That I Was Once by Your Side (내가 너의 곁에 잠시 살았다는 걸)	Toy
May 12, 2017; May 19, 2017 ("Musical Star Wars" Special 2)	Special	Nam Kyung-joo, Kim Seon-kyung, Seo Young-joo, Kim Seung-dae, Choi Woo-ri, Seo Kyung-soo				Oh! Carol (오! 캐롤)	Musical "Oh! Carol" OST
May 12, 2017; May 19, 2017 ("Musical Star Wars" Special 2)	10	Nam Kyung-joo (6)	Kim Seung-dae (7)	—	—	The Last Match (마지막 승부) (Drama The Last Match OST)	Kim Min-kyo
May 12, 2017; May 19, 2017 ("Musical Star Wars" Special 2)	11	All-killed	Kim Seung-dae (4)	Seo Young-joo (9)	—	Chan-Chan-Chan (찬찬찬)	Pyeon Seung-yeop
May 12, 2017; May 19, 2017 ("Musical Star Wars" Special 2)	12	All-killed	All-killed	Seo Young-joo (0)	Kim Shin-eui (13)	Heeya (희야)	Boohwal (Vocal: Lee Seung-chul)
May 12, 2017; May 19, 2017 ("Musical Star Wars" Special 2)	13	All-killed	All-killed	Jang Eun-ah (6)	Kim Shin-eui (7)	Tears	So Chan-whee
May 12, 2017; May 19, 2017 ("Musical Star Wars" Special 2)	Result	Muzie team won and received the Han-u sets.					
