= Kim Dong-ho =

South Korean actor

- Born: August 17, 1985 (age 41); Seoul, South Korea
- Other name: Kang Dong-ho (former stage name)
- Education: Dankook University
- Occupation: Actor
- Years active: 2005–present
- Agent: Initial Entertainment
- Spouse: Shin Yoonjo (m. 2023)

Korean name
- Hangul: 김동호
- Hanja: 金東浩
- RR: Gim Dongho
- MR: Kim Tongho

Kim Dong-ho (Korean: 김동호; born August 17, 1985), former stage name Kang Dong-ho, is a South Korean actor. He is mostly active in musicals.

In 2005, Kim began his acting career with the musical A Secret Garden. He then made his screen debut in the television series Twinkle Twinkle (2011), which earned him a Baeksang Arts Award nomination. He also appeared in the television series Wild Romance (2012), My Husband Got a Family (2012), Graceful Friends (2020), and Undercover (2021).

== Personal life ==
On September 11, 2023, Kim announced that he would marry singer Yoonjo, a former member of Hello Venus and UNI.T, in November. The couple married in a private ceremony on November 19, 2023.

== Theater ==
Year	Title	Role	Reprised
2005	The Secret Garden		
2005	The Sorrows of Young Werther	카인즈	2006
2005	A Midsummer's Nightmare		
2006	Grease	Danny Zuko/Doody	2006–2007, 2007, 2009–2010, 2010
2007	Finding Kim Jong-wook	Kim Jong-wook/First Love	2012
2007	The Beautiful Game	Frank	
2008	Hamlet	Laertes	
2008	Thrill Me	Richard Loeb	
2009	Dracula: The Musical?	Dracula/Jonathan Harker	
2009–2010	Singles	Su-heon	2010
2010	Cats on the Roof	Lee Kyung-min	2011–2012
2010	Goong: Musical	Lee Shin	2011
2010–2011	True West	Austin	
2013	Gwanghwamun Sonata 2	Adam	
2013	High School Musical	Troy Bolton	
2013–2014	The Wedding Singer	Robbie Hart	
2016	Daddy Long Legs	Jervis	

== Filmography ==
=== Film ===
Year	Title	Role	Notes
2014	One Day, The First Love Invaded Me	Young-jae	
2021	A Trap	Ki-young	
2022	Dan's Family No. 1	Ki-woong	

=== Television series ===
Year	Title	Role	Notes/Ref.
2011	Twinkle Twinkle	Kang Dae-beom	
2012	Wild Romance	Kim Tae-han	
2012	My Husband Got a Family	Han Kyu-hyun	
2016	My Runway	Na Jin-wook	
2016–2017	Bubbly Lovely	Yoon Dong-joon	
2020	Men Are Men	Man at wedding	Cameo (episode 1)
2020	Graceful Friends	Seo Joo-won	
2021	Undercover	Cheon Woo-jin	Guest (episodes 2 and 8)
2021	The Penthouse: War in Life	Clothing store owner	Cameo (season 3 - episode 13)
2023	The Matchmakers	Ahn Dong-gun	

=== Variety show ===
Year	Title	Notes
2012	Exploration of Genders	Cast member
2016	King of Mask Singer	Contestant (A Train to the World) Episode 49
2016–2017	Singing Battle	Contestant; 6th Game (episodes 10–11); 10th Game (episodes 18–19)

== Discography ==
=== Soundtrack appearances ===
Year	Song title	Notes
2011	"My Love"	track from Twinkle Twinkle OST

== Awards and nominations ==
Year	Award	Category	Nominated work	Result
2011	4th Korea Drama Awards	Best New Actor	Twinkle Twinkle	Nominated
2011	30th MBC Drama Awards	Best New Actor in a Serial Drama	Twinkle Twinkle	Nominated
2012	48th Baeksang Arts Awards	Best New Actor – Television	Twinkle Twinkle	Nominated
