= Busan Kyungsang College =

College in Busan, South Korea

- 부산경상대학교
- Established: 1980; 46 years ago
- President: Park Seok-Yong
- Students: 3,700
- Location: Busan, South Korea; 35.18432°N 129.09918°E
- Website: www.psks.ac.kr at the Wayback Machine (archived December 10, 2004)

- Busan Kyungsang College
- Hangul: 부산경상대학교
- Hanja: 釜山經商大學校
- RR: Busan gyeongsang daehakgyo
- MR: Pusan kyŏngsang taehakkyo

Busan Kyungsang College is a college in the Yeonje-gu district of Busan Metropolitan City, in southeastern South Korea. It has a legal maximum enrollment of 3,700 students.

== Academic departments ==
The college offers training in technical and business-related fields. According to the school, the Department of Mobile Games is the only mobile game department in South Korea.

== History ==
The school opened its doors on March 8, 1980. The Hwashin School Foundation, which founded it, was established in 1977. The current President, Park Seok-Yong, was installed in 2001.

== Notable alumni ==
- Bae Ki-sung, singer (Can)
- Song Kang-ho, actor

== See also ==
- List of colleges and universities in South Korea
- Education in South Korea
