= Twinkle Twinkle (TV series) =

South Korean television series

- Promotional poster for Twinkle Twinkle
- Also known as: Sparkling; Shining; All That Glitters
- Genre: Drama; Romance; Family
- Written by: Bae Yoo-mi
- Directed by: Noh Do-chul
- Starring: Kim Hyun-joo; Lee Yu-ri; Kim Suk-hoon; Kang Dong-ho
- Country of origin: South Korea
- Original language: Korean
- No. of episodes: 54

Production
- Producer: Lee Dae-young
- Running time: 60 minutes
- Production companies: Annex Telecom; Hoga Entertainment

Original release
- Network: MBC TV
- Release: February 12 – August 14, 2011

Twinkle Twinkle (Korean: 반짝반짝 빛나는; RR: Banjjakbanjjak binnaneun) is a South Korean television series starring Kim Hyun-joo, Lee Yu-ri, Kim Suk-hoon and Kang Dong-ho. It aired on MBC TV from February 12 to August 14, 2011 on Saturdays and Sundays at 20:40 for 54 episodes.

== Plot ==
Twinkle, Twinkle is a light, cheerful, and heartwarming family drama that tells the success story of Han Jung-won (Kim Hyun-joo), a workaholic career woman who is determined to make her own way in the world without the help of her family, which has garnered considerable wealth from their publishing company.

But what Jung-won doesn't know is that because of the hospital's negligence, she was switched at birth with another baby, Hwang Geum-ran (Lee Yu-ri). The identity swap resulted in the two girls being raised by families of different wealth and status, and living a different fate.

When Geum-ran learns the truth, she sees it as a way to reverse her poverty-stricken circumstances. But even after being restored to her rich biological parents, Geum-ran's bitterness makes her consider Jung-won her rival, and she continues to torment her. Jung-won, whose life has been turned upside down, faces numerous setbacks on the road to recovery.

== Cast ==
Main characters

- Kim Hyun-joo as Han/Hwang Jung-won
- Lee Yu-ri as Hwang/Han Geum-ran
- Kim Suk-hoon as Song Seung-joon
- Kang Dong-ho as Kang Dae-beom

Han family

- Jang Yong as Han Ji-woong
- Park Jung-soo as Jin Na-hee
- Kim Hyung-beom as Han Sang-won
- Park Yu-hwan as Han Seo-woo
- Jeon Soo-kyeong as Lee Eun-jung

Hwang family

- Go Doo-shim as Lee Kwon-yang
- Kil Yong-woo as Hwang Nam-bong
- Lee Ah-hyun as Hwang Tae-ran
- Han Ji-woo as Hwang Mi-ran
- Kim Sang-ho as Park Joong-hyuk
- Shin Soo-yeon as Park Ji-won

Extended cast

- Kim Ji-young as Go Eun-hye
- Jung Tae-woo as Yoon Seung-jae
- Won Ki-joon as Jegal Joon-soo
- Yoo Sa-ra as Han Song-yi
- Gong Ki-tak as Song Kwang-hee
- Kim Ji-seong as Team leader
- Choi Su-rin as Lee Ji-soo
- Im Chi-woo as Kwang-soo
- Yoon Hee-seok as Nam Sung-woo
- Joo Da-young as Hye-rin
- Yoo Chae-yeong as Pi Ba-da (cameo)
- Kim Soo-hyun

== Viewership ==
Average TV viewership ratings
Ep	Original broadcast date	TNmS		AGB Nielsen	
Ep	Original broadcast date	Nationwide	Seoul	Nationwide	Seoul
1	2011/02/05	7.2%	8.6%	9.6%	11.2%
2	2011/02/06	8.3%	10.1%	8.9%	10.1%
3	2011/02/12	8.7%	10.7%	10.3%	12.0%
4	2011/02/13	8.2%	10.4%	9.9%	11.1%
5	2011/02/19	9.8%	12.9%	10.5%	11.6%
6	2011/02/20	10.7%	13.2%	12.8%	14.2%
7	2011/02/26	11.4%	14.0%	13.9%	16.4%
8	2011/02/27	11.2%	13.7%	14.8%	17.4%
9	2011/03/05	10.4%	13.0%	12.4%	14.2%
10	2011/03/06	13.0%	16.2%	15.0%	16.9%
11	2011/03/12	11.8%	14.8%	13.2%	15.2%
12	2011/03/13	12.3%	15.1%	15.1%	17.1%
13	2011/03/19	13.3%	16.3%	14.8%	16.3%
14	2011/03/20	14.1%	18.0%	15.6%	17.5%
15	2011/03/26	13.1%	16.5%	13.5%	16.0%
16	2011/03/27	13.5%	17.1%	15.8%	17.8%
17	2011/04/09	12.8%	17.6%	15.5%	17.2%
18	2011/04/10	16.8%	19.2%	14.8%	19.0%
19	2011/04/16	13.6%	17.2%	15.2%	16.2%
20	2011/04/17	13.8%	16.9%	17.2%	19.7%
21	2011/04/23	14.0%	17.8%	15.5%	17.7%
22	2011/04/24	15.4%	19.2%	15.9%	17.0%
23	2011/05/01	13.2%	15.5%	16.0%	15.8%
24	2011/05/07	14.3%	17.1%	16.9%	18.2%
25	2011/05/08	14.3%	17.0%	16.4%	17.9%
26	2011/05/14	15.5%	18.9%	19.1%	20.4%
27	2011/05/15	15.7%	19.3%	19.4%	21.0%
28	2011/05/28	16.8%	20.4%	21.6%	23.2%
29	2011/05/29	13.9%	17.8%	17.8%	19.0%
30	2011/06/04	17.1%	19.7%	19.5%	21.1%
31	2011/06/05	15.7%	18.9%	19.6%	19.1%
32	2011/06/11	16.7%	20.2%	19.8%	21.1%
33	2011/06/12	16.3%	18.3%	19.7%	21.2%
34	2011/06/18	16.5%	18.1%	18.5%	20.0%
35	2011/06/19	16.6%	19.3%	19.3%	20.3%
36	2011/06/25	18.6%	22.7%	21.6%	23.2%
37	2011/06/26	17.6%	21.0%	19.5%	21.6%
38	2011/07/02	19.1%	22.3%	21.3%	23.6%
39	2011/07/03	19.8%	23.2%	22.5%	25.6%
40	2011/07/09	18.1%	21.1%	22.2%	23.9%
41	2011/07/10	18.8%	21.6%	19.5%	20.9%
42	2011/07/16	20.6%	26.2%	23.2%	24.7%
43	2011/07/17	20.5%	24.2%	21.5%	22.7%
44	2011/07/23	20.4%	24.7%	22.9%	24.6%
45	2011/07/24	18.0%	21.4%	21.1%	23.5%
46	2011/07/30	20.3%	24.3%	21.9%	23.7%
47	2011/07/31	17.6%	21.4%	20.9%	21.9%
48	2011/08/06	19.0%	22.8%	21.3%	22.8%
49	2011/08/07	19.9%	24.2%	21.7%	22.3%
50	2011/08/13	19.5%	24.5%	22.5%	23.8%
51	2011/08/14	22.1%	26.3%	24.3%	25.9%
52	2011/08/20	21.7%	23.9%	25.3%	26.7%
53	2011/08/21	19.9%	23.4%	21.6%	22.6%
54	2011/08/27	19.4%	22.3%	22.5%	23.8%
Average		15.5%	18.7%	17.8%	19.4%
In the table above, the blue numbers represent the lowest ratings and the red numbers represent the highest ratings.; N/A denotes that the rating is not known.; This series aired on a cable channel/pay TV which normally has a relatively smaller audience compared to free-to-air TV/public broadcasters (KBS, SBS, MBC and EBS).

== Awards and nominations ==
Year	Award	Category	Recipient	Result
2011	4th Korea Drama Awards	Best Drama	Twinkle Twinkle	Nominated
2011	4th Korea Drama Awards	Best Actress	Kim Hyun-joo	Nominated
2011	4th Korea Drama Awards	Best Supporting Actor	Kim Sang-ho	Nominated
2011	4th Korea Drama Awards	Best Supporting Actress	Lee Yu-ri	Won
2011	4th Korea Drama Awards	Best New Actor	Kang Dong-ho	Nominated
2011	MBC Drama Awards	Drama of the Year	Twinkle Twinkle	Nominated
2011	MBC Drama Awards	Top Excellence Award, Actor in a Serial Drama	Kim Suk-hoon	Won
2011	MBC Drama Awards	Top Excellence Award, Actress in a Serial Drama	Kim Hyun-joo	Won
2011	MBC Drama Awards	Excellence Award, Actress in a Serial Drama	Lee Yu-ri	Won
2011	MBC Drama Awards	Golden Acting Award, Actor in a Serial Drama	Kil Yong-woo	Won
2011	MBC Drama Awards	Best New Actor in a Serial Drama	Kang Dong-ho	Nominated
2011	MBC Drama Awards	Best New Actor in a Serial Drama	Park Yu-hwan	Nominated
2011	MBC Drama Awards	Writer of the Year	Bae Yoo-mi	Won
2011	MBC Drama Awards	Popularity Award, Actor	Kim Suk-hoon	Nominated
2011	MBC Drama Awards	Popularity Award, Actress	Kim Hyun-joo	Nominated
2011	MBC Drama Awards	Best Couple Award	Kim Suk-hoon and Kim Hyun-joo	Nominated
2012	48th Baeksang Arts Awards	Best Director (TV)	Noh Do-chul	Nominated
2012	48th Baeksang Arts Awards	Best Actress (TV)	Kim Hyun-joo	Nominated
2012	48th Baeksang Arts Awards	Best New Actor (TV)	Kang Dong-ho	Nominated
