= Park Yu-hwan =

South Korean actor

Park Yu-Hwan
- Born: March 9, 1991 (age 35); Songpa-gu, Seoul, South Korea
- Other name: Ricky Park
- Occupation: Actor
- Years active: 2011–2021
- Family: Park Yoo-chun (older brother)

Korean name
- Hangul: 박유환
- Hanja: 朴有煥
- RR: Bak Yuhwan
- MR: Pak Yuhwan

Park Yu-Hwan (born March 9, 1991) is a South Korean actor.

== Early life ==
On March 9, 1991, Park was born in Songpa-gu, Seoul, South Korea.

In November 2021, Park was arrested by Korean police for marijuana use in Bangkok, Thailand.

== Career ==
Park's career started when he was cast as a supporting character in the 2011 MBC's series Twinkle Twinkle. He played the half-uncle to lead actress Kim Hyun-joo's character, Han Seo-woo. While still working on Twinkle Twinkle, Park was cast in a small recurring role as Book-jo in another MBC's series Gyebaek. In his next acting project, the 2011 SBS's series A Thousand Days' Promise, Park portrayed Lee Moon-kwon, the younger brother of lead actress Soo Ae's character. His performance earned him a nomination at the 48th Baeksang Arts Awards for Best New Actor.

In 2012, Park landed his first leading role in the Channel A's series K-Pop: The Ultimate Audition, playing Kang Woo-hyun, the ignorant and bad-tempered leader of boy band M2. He starred opposite Go Eun-ah, who played a happy-go-lucky girl named Ji Seung-yeon. In May 2012, Park returned to MBC to star in the new daily drama Can't Live Without You as Kim Min-do.

== Filmography ==
=== Television series ===
| Year | Title | Role |
|---|---|---|
| 2011 | Twinkle Twinkle | Han Seo-woo |
| 2011 | Gyebaek | Book-jo (ep.5-7,12,15) |
| 2011 | A Thousand Days' Promise | Lee Moon-kwon |
| 2012 | The Strongest K-Pop Survival | Kang Woo-hyun |
| 2012 | Can't Live Without You | Kim Min-do |
| 2014 | I Need Romance 3 | Lee Woo-young |
| 2015 | She Was Pretty | Kim Joon-woo |

=== Films ===
| Year | Title | Role |
|---|---|---|
| 2015 | Equals | Seth |
| 2016 | Musudan | Goo Yoon-Gil |
| 2017 | One Line | Hyuk-Jin |

=== Variety shows ===
| Year | Title | Notes |
|---|---|---|
| 2016 | Law of the Jungle – Panama | Cast member (ep.199-202) |

== Endorsements ==
- HEAD (2011)
- CHRIS. CHRISTY (2011)
- Samsung Galaxy Tab 'The Lovers' (2011)

== Awards and nominations ==
| Year | Award | Category | Nominated work | Result |
|---|---|---|---|---|
| 2011 | 30th MBC Drama Awards | Best New Actor in a Serial Drama | Twinkle Twinkle | Nominated |
| 2012 | 48th Paeksang Arts Awards | Best New Actor | A Thousand Days' Promise | Nominated |
| 2012 | 5th Korea Drama Awards | Best New Actor | A Thousand Days' Promise | Nominated |
| 2015 | 34th MBC Drama Awards | Best New Actor in a Miniseries | She Was Pretty | Nominated |
