= 48th Baeksang Arts Awards =

2012 edition of award ceremony

- Date: April 26, 2012
- Site: Olympic Hall in Jamil, Seoul
- Hosted by: Lee Hwi-jae; Kim Ah-joong

Television coverage
- Network: jTBC

The 48th Baeksang Arts Awards ceremony was held at the Olympic Hall in Jamil, Seoul on 26 April 2012, and broadcast on jTBC. It was hosted by comedian Lee Hwi-jae and actress Kim Ah-joong.

== Winners and nominees ==
Complete list of nominees and winners:

(Winners denoted in bold)

=== Film ===
Grand Prize (Film)
**Nameless Gangster: Rules of the Time**
Best Film	Best New Director (Film)
**Unbowed**; Helpless; Punch; Sunny; Nameless Gangster: Rules of the Time	**Im Chan-ik** - **Officer of the Year**; Han Sang-ho - Speckles: The Tarbosaurus; Huh Jong-ho - Countdown; Kim Jung-hwan - Penny Pinchers; Park In-je - Moby Dick
Best Director (Film)	Best Screenplay
**Byun Young-joo** - **Helpless**; Chung Ji-young - Unbowed; Jeon Kye-soo - Love Fiction; Lee Han - Punch; Yoon Jong-bin - Nameless Gangster: Rules of the Time	**Jeon Kye-soo** - **Love Fiction**; Han Hyeon-geun, Chung Ji-young - Unbowed; Park In-je - Moby Dick; Park Sang-yeon - The Front Line; Yoon Jong-bin - Nameless Gangster: Rules of the Time
Best Actor (Film)	Best Actress (Film)
**Ahn Sung-ki - Unbowed as Kim Kyung-ho**; Choi Min-sik - Nameless Gangster: Rules of the Time as Choi Ik-hyun; Gong Yoo - Silenced as Kang In-ho; Kim Yoon-seok - Punch as Lee Dong-ju; Park Hae-il - War of the Arrows as Choi Nam-yi	**Uhm Jung-hwa** - **Dancing Queen as Jung-hwa**; Jung Ryeo-won - Pained as Dong-hyun; Kim Min-hee - Helpless as Kang Seon-yeong/Cha Gyeong-seon; Shim Eun-kyung - Sunny as teenage Im Na-mi; Son Ye-jin - Spellbound as Kang Yeo-ri
Best New Actor (Film)	Best New Actress (Film)
**Kim Sung-kyun** - **Nameless Gangster: Rules of the Time as Park Chang-woo**; Joo Won - S.I.U as Kim Ho-ryong; Lee Je-hoon - Architecture 101 as Lee Seung-min; Lee Kwang-soo - Wonderful Radio as Cha Dae-geun	**Suzy** - **Architecture 101 as Yang Seo-yeon**; Go Ara - Papa as June; Kang So-ra - Sunny as teenage Ha Chun-hwa; Kim Hye-eun - Nameless Gangster: Rules of the Time as Miss Yeo; Oh Na-ra - Dancing Queen as Ra-ri
Most Popular Actor (Film)	Most Popular Actress (Film)
**Jang Keun-suk** - **You're My Pet as Kang In-ho**	**Kang So-ra** - **Sunny as teenage Ha Chun-hwa**

=== Television ===
Grand Prize	Best Drama
**Deep Rooted Tree (drama)**	**Moon Embracing the Sun**; Brain; Deep Rooted Tree; The Greatest Love; The Princess' Man
Best Entertainment Program	Best Educational Show
**Gag Concert**; 1 Night, 2 Days; I Am a Singer; Jjak; K-pop Star	**Civilization and Mathematics**; KBS Science Project – Exploration of Human: Memory; Christmas Special SBS Special Miracle Harmony; Tears of the Antarctic; Dharma
Best Director	Best Screenplay
**Kim Jung-min, Park Hyun-suk** – **The Princess' Man**; Jang Tae-yoo – Deep Rooted Tree; Kim Do-hoon, Lee Sung-jun - Moon Embracing the Sun; Noh Do-chul – Twinkle Twinkle; Yoo Hyun-ki, Song Hyun-wook – Brain	**Kim Young-hyun, Park Sang-yeon** – **Deep Rooted Tree**; Choi Wan-kyu – Lights and Shadows; Hong Mi-ran, Hong Jung-eun – The Greatest Love; Jo Jung-joo, Kim Wook – The Princess' Man; Yoon Kyung-ah – Brain
Best Actor	Best Actress
**Kim Soo-hyun – Moon Embracing the Sun as King Lee Hwon**; Cha Seung-won – The Greatest Love as Dokko Jin; Han Suk-kyu – Deep Rooted Tree as King Sejong; Park Si-hoo – The Princess' Man as Kim Seung-yoo; Shin Ha-kyun – Brain as Lee Kang-hoon	**Gong Hyo-jin – The Greatest Love as Goo Ae-jung**; Kim Hyun-joo – Twinkle Twinkle as Han/Hwang Jung-won; Kim Sun-a – Scent of a Woman as Lee Yeon-jae; Moon Chae-won – The Princess' Man as Lee Se-ryung; Soo Ae – A Thousand Days' Promise as Lee Seo-yeon
Best New Actor	Best New Actress
**Joo Won – Ojakgyo Family as Hwang Tae-hee**; Kang Dong-ho – Twinkle Twinkle as Kang Dae-beom; Park Yoon-jae – Iron Daughters-in-Law as Moon Shin-woo; Park Yu-hwan – A Thousand Days' Promise as Lee Moon-kwon; Yeo Jin-goo – Moon Embracing the Sun as young Lee Hwon	**Uee – Ojakgyo Family as Baek Ja-eun**; Im Soo-hyang – New Tales of Gisaeng as Dan Sa-ran; Jeong Yu-mi – A Thousand Days' Promise as Noh Hyang-gi; Kang So-ra – Dream High 2 as Shin Hae-sung; Kim You-jung – Moon Embracing the Sun as young Heo Yeon-woo
Best Male Variety Performer	Best Female Variety Performer
**Kim Jun-hyun – Gag Concert**; Kim Gu-ra – Radio Star; Kim Byung-man – Law of Jungle; Lee Jong-suk – High Kick: Revenge of the Short Legged; Choi Hyo-jong – Gag Concert	**Park Ha-sun – High Kick: Revenge of the Short Legged**; Song Ji-hyo – Running Man; Shin Bo-ra – Gag Concert; Jeong Kyeong-mi – Gag Concert; Jung Ju-ri – Strong Heart
Most Popular Actor	Most Popular Actress
**Park Yoochun – Miss Ripley as Song Yoo-hyun / Yutaka**	**Park Shin-hye – Heartstrings as Lee Gyu-won**
