= A Thousand Days' Promise =

2011 South Korean television series

- Promotional poster
- Also known as: A Promise of a Thousand Days
- Hangul: 천일의 약속
- Hanja: 千日의 約束
- RR: Cheonirui yaksok
- MR: Ch'ŏnirŭi yaksok
- Genre: Romance; Melodrama
- Written by: Kim Soo-hyun
- Directed by: Jung Eul-young
- Starring: Soo Ae; Kim Rae-won
- Country of origin: South Korea
- Original language: Korean
- No. of episodes: 20

Production
- Executive producers: Responsible Producer (SBS); Cho Nam-guk
- Producers: Lee Myeong-sook; Son Ok-hyun
- Production location: Korea
- Running time: Mondays and Tuesdays at 21:55 (KST)
- Production companies: Yein E&M

Original release
- Network: Seoul Broadcasting System
- Release: 17 October – 20 December 2011

A Thousand Days' Promise (Korean: 천일의 약속; RR: Cheonirui yaksok) is a 2011 South Korean traditional melodrama about a woman (Soo Ae) who is losing her memory and the loving man (Kim Rae-won) who stands by her side. Written by famed drama writer Kim Soo-hyun, it aired on SBS from October 17 to December 20, 2011 on Mondays and Tuesdays at 21:55 for 20 episodes.

== Synopsis ==
Lee Seo-yeon, a free-spirited woman, is having a secret affair with Park Ji-hyung, an architect who has a fiancée. Upon hearing that Ji-hyung's parents set the date for his wedding, Seo-yeon splits up with him. But she has no time to lament over her painful breakup, as she gets diagnosed with early on-set Alzheimer's, a very unlikely disease for a 30-year-old woman. Ji-hyung happens to learn the shocking fact, and he breaks off his engagement only two days before the wedding to return to his ex-girlfriend. Despite vehement opposition from his parents and even from Seo-yeon herself, he never gives up on her and marries her without delay. The doting husband is devoted to taking care of his ailing wife, who is losing her ability to remember. Despite her distressing condition, the couple tries to hang on to love and experience it to the end. They have a baby girl and find happiness in their married life from time to time, even though both are well aware that a tragic end awaits them.

== Cast ==
- Soo Ae as Lee Seo-yeon
  - Han Bo-bae as young Seo-yeon
- Kim Rae-won as Park Ji-hyung
- Lee Sang-woo as Jang Jae-min, Seo-yeon's cousin
- Jeong Yu-mi as Noh Hyang-gi
- Park Yu-hwan as Lee Moon-kwon, Seo-yeon's brother
- Oh Mi-yeon as Seo-yeon's aunt
- Kim Hae-sook as Kang Soo-jung, Ji-hyung's mother
- Lee Mi-sook as Oh Hyun-ah, Hyang-gi's mother
- Moon Jeong-hee as Jang Myung-hee, Seo-yeon's cousin
- Yoo Hye-ri as Guem-yoon
- Im Chae-moo as Park Chang-joo, Ji-hyung's father
- Park Yeong-gyu as Noh Hong-gil, Hyang-gi's father
- Yoo Seung-bong as Seo-yeon's uncle-in-law
- Jung Joon as Cha Dong-chul, Myung-hee's husband
- Yang Han-yeol as Myung-hee's son
- Kim Boo-seon as Seo-yeon's biological mother
- Jang Hyun-sung as Seo-yeon's doctor
- Kang Rae-yeon as Myung-hee
- Song Chang-eui as Noh Young-soo, Hyang-gi's brother
- Alex Chu as Son Suk-ho, Ji-hyung's friend
- Oh Kyung-soo as Seo-yeon's editor-in-chief

== Soundtrack ==
Information

- Title: 천일의 약속 OST / A Thousand Days' Promise
- Artist: Various Artists
- Language: Korean
- Release Date: 2011-Nov-29
- Number of Tracks: 15
- Publisher: KT Music (KT뮤직)
- Agency: Yeinmoonhwa (예인문화)

Track Listing

No.	Song title	Artist
1.	It Hurts Here (Ver. 1) 여기가 아파 (Ver. 1)	Baek Ji-young
2.	Like Words Being Said for the First Time 처음 하는 말처럼	Shin Seung-hoon
3.	One Love 한번의 사랑	Sung Si-kyung
4.	One Person 한 사람	8Eight
5.	Don't Love 사랑하지마	Park Ji-hee
6.	It Hurts Here (Ver. 2) 여기가 아파 (Ver. 2)	Baek Ji-young
7.	Pain (Main Title)	Various Artists
8.	Blessing	Various Artists
9.	Sky Garden 하늘 정원	Various Artists
10.	Time of Solitude 고독의 시간	Various Artists
11.	Despair	Various Artists
12.	Pain	Various Artists
13.	Doubt 의심	Various Artists
14.	Disease	Various Artists
15.	Smile Again	Various Artists

== Ratings ==
Date	Episode	Nationwide	Seoul area
2011-10-17	01	12.1% (8th)	14.8% (3rd)
2011-10-18	02	13.0% (7th)	16.2% (4th)
2011-10-24	03	14.3% (7th)	16.8% (4th)
2011-10-25	04	14.9% (3rd)	17.2% (3rd)
2011-10-31	05	14.9% (3rd)	17.3% (3rd)
2011-11-01	06	16.4% (3rd)	19.4% (3rd)
2011-11-07	07	15.8% (3rd)	19.3% (1st)
2011-11-08	08	16.9% (4th)	19.5% (2nd)
2011-11-14	09	15.8% (4th)	19.0% (2nd)
2011-11-15	10	16.2% (4th)	19.4% (2nd)
2011-11-21	11	15.2% (3rd)	17.7% (3rd)
2011-11-22	12	15.7% (3rd)	19.0% (2nd)
2011-11-28	13	14.6% (4th)	17.6% (3rd)
2011-11-29	14	14.4% (5th)	18.2% (3rd)
2011-12-05	15	14.1% (4th)	17.1% (3rd)
2011-12-06	16	15.0% (4th)	18.5% (3rd)
2011-12-12	17	14.7% (3rd)	18.4% (3rd)
2011-12-13	18	15.4% (4th)	18.5% (3rd)
2011-12-19	19	15.7% (1st)	19.3% (1st)
2011-12-20	20	19.6% (2nd)	23.5% (1st)
Average		15.2%	18.3%

Source: TNmS Media Korea

== Awards and nominations ==
Year	Award	Category	Recipient	Result
2011	SBS Drama Awards	Best Drama	A Thousand Days' Promise	Nominated
2011	SBS Drama Awards	Top Excellence Award, Actor in a Special Planning Drama	Kim Rae-won	Won
2011	SBS Drama Awards	Top Excellence Award, Actress in a Special Planning Drama	Soo Ae	Won
2011	SBS Drama Awards	Excellence Award, Actor in a Special Planning Drama	Lee Sang-woo	Nominated
2011	SBS Drama Awards	Excellence Award, Actress in a Special Planning Drama	Jeong Yu-mi	Nominated
2011	SBS Drama Awards	Special Acting Award, Actress in a Special Planning Drama	Lee Mi-sook	Won
2011	SBS Drama Awards	New Star Award	Jeong Yu-mi	Won
2011	SBS Drama Awards	Top 10 Stars	Soo Ae	Won
2011	SBS Drama Awards	Top 10 Stars	Kim Rae-won	Won
2012	48th Baeksang Arts Awards	Best Actress (TV)	Soo Ae	Nominated
2012	48th Baeksang Arts Awards	Best New Actor (TV)	Park Yu-hwan	Nominated
2012	48th Baeksang Arts Awards	Best New Actress (TV)	Jeong Yu-mi	Nominated
2012	7th Seoul International Drama Awards	Best Screenwriter	Kim Soo-hyun	Nominated
2012	5th Korea Drama Awards	Top Excellence Award, Actress	Soo Ae	Nominated
2012	5th Korea Drama Awards	Best New Actor	Park Yu-hwan	Nominated

== International broadcast ==
=== Philippines ===
Aired on ABS-CBN as "A Promise of a Thousand Days" from May 27 to July 12, 2013 replacing Glory Jane on Kapamilya Gold.

== See also ==
- A Moment to Remember, a 2004 South Korean film in which the female protagonist has early-onset Alzheimer's.
