= Singing Battle =

- Also known as: Singing Battle – Victory; Song Fight
- Genre: Variety show Game Show; Music
- Directed by: Kim Kwang-soo; Son Soo-hee
- Presented by: Hyun Woo
- Country of origin: South Korea
- No. of seasons: 1
- No. of episodes: Pilot: 2 Season 1: 29 (list of episodes)

Production
- Running time: 90 minutes
- Production company: Korean Broadcasting System

Original release
- Network: KBS2
- Release: September 16, 2016 (Pilot); October 21, 2016 – May 19, 2017

Singing Battle (Korean: 노래싸움 - 승부; Hanja: 노래싸움 - 勝負; RR: Noraessaum - seungbu) is a 2016 South Korean television program hosted by Namkoong Min and Hyun Woo. It began to air on KBS2 every Fridays at 20:30 (KST) starting October 21, 2016. Season 1's last episode was broadcast on May 19, 2017.

== Broadcast Information ==
Broadcast date	Broadcast time	Remark
September 16, 2016	Friday at 17:30 – 20:30 (KST)	Pilot
October 21, 2016 – May 19, 2017	Friday at 20:30 – 22:00 (KST)	Regular broadcast

== Format ==
Main rule (not including pilot episodes and special episodes)

12 contestants (non-original singer) divided into 4 teams and performed one-on-one for each round. In the first round, the song will be randomly chosen and two first contestants decides to perform by press on the button. From round 2 to the end, the winning team of each round can choose the next team and contestant, but the contestant challenged will be prioritized to choose the song. The winners of each round are selected by 13 judges through instant live votes starting the last half of the song. The contestant who don't receive any vote of 7 first judges (K.O.) can be directly eliminated, no need to wait until the end of the song. The loser will be felled down a hole full of solid foam at the end of each performance. Each team has a hidden card, an original singer, and it will be used only one time follow the decision of the team leader. The hidden card just perform only one round and hold the fate, advance to the next round or be eliminated, of the principal contestant that they replace.

A new rule was introduced in 3rd Game (episodes 4–5), when all four teams have at least one loser, an only revival round will take place for only one loser of each team (mostly after the 5th or 6th round). Two songs will be randomly chosen for two pairs, the team which want to compete will push on the red button and the team leader will choose the competitor, then someone of each pair who win can return the main competition round.

Since episode 18, the K.O. rule was removed, the contestants' final result will be revealed at the end of each performance without exception.

Since episode 22, there was a special rule of MC: "If a team receives totally three yellow cards by MC (for example the team exceeded the time of consultation to select a song), and if they win in the final, their prize will be deprived."

Additional rules (changed in few episodes)

On the 6th Game (episodes 10–11), the team leader, who is an original singer, can play role as a hidden card and the others hidden cards will appear in their teams since the beginning. The rule of hidden card remain unchangeable.

== Host ==
- Namkoong Min (Pilot, Episodes 1–21)
- Hyun Woo (Episodes 22–29)

== Team leader ==
Leader	Episodes	Number (of)				Winning ratio
Leader	Episodes	Matches	Wins	Losses	Final wins	Winning ratio
Tony An	12–13	7	3	4	0	42.86%
Jo Gyu-chan	2–13	41	21	20	2	51.22%
Jung Jae-hyung	Pilot	4	2	2	1	50.00%
Kangta	2–3	5	3	2	1	60.00%
Kim Gwang-jin	4–5	7	4	3	1	57.14%
Kim Hyung-seok	Pilot, 2–9	38	21	17	1	55.26%
JK Kim Dong-wook	1–2	5	2	3	0	40.00%
Kim Jong-min	14–15	6	2	4	0	33.33%
Kim Soo-ro	1–2, 10–21	44	19	25	2	43.18%
Lee Sang-min	Pilot, 1–3, 6–9, 16–29	80	39	41	3	48.75%
Muzie	10–11, 14–29	65	33	32	3	50.77%
Park Kyung-lim	22–29	30	14	16	0	46.67%
Park Soo-hong	4–7, 12–29	93	51	42	2	54.84%
Park Wan-kyu	10–11	7	3	4	0	42.86%
Yang Dong-geun	1–2	5	2	3	0	40.00%
Yoon Do-hyun	Pilot	6	3	3	0	50.00%
Yoon Il-sang	8–9	8	4	4	0	50.00%
Yoon Jong-shin	Pilot	5	2	3	0	40.00%

== Ratings ==
In the table below, the blue numbers represent the lowest ratings and the red numbers represent the highest ratings.

=== 2016 ===
List of ratings in 2016 (Pilot, Episodes 1–10)

Episode #	Broadcast Date	TNmS Ratings	AGB Ratings
Pilot 1	September 16, 2016	4.9%	4.8%
Pilot 2	September 16, 2016	12.1%	10.6%
1	October 21, 2016	5.2%	5.7%
2	October 28, 2016	3.7%	3.9%
3	November 4, 2016	3.9%	4.1%
4	November 18, 2016	4.9%	5.3%
5	November 25, 2016	4.7%	5.3%
6	December 2, 2016	4.6%	5.5%
7	December 9, 2016	5.9%	5.6%
8	December 16, 2016	4.7%	5.0%
9	December 23, 2016	4.0%	4.1%
10	December 30, 2016	3.7%	4.8%

=== 2017 ===
List of ratings in 2017 (Episodes 11–29)

Episode #	Broadcast Date	TNmS Ratings	AGB Ratings
11	January 6, 2017	4.9%	4.8%
12	January 13, 2017	4.0%	4.9%
13	January 20, 2017	3.4%	4.3%
14	January 27, 2017	5.0%	5.3%
15	February 3, 2017	4.3%	4.7%
16	February 10, 2017	4.7%	5.3%
17	February 17, 2017	3.6%	5.5%
18	February 24, 2017	4.6%	5.0%
19	March 3, 2017	4.0%	4.8%
20	March 17, 2017	4.2%	4.5%
21	March 24, 2017	4.9%	5.1%
22	March 31, 2017	4.4%	4.6%
23	April 7, 2017	3.4%	4.2%
24	April 14, 2017	3.5%	4.1%
25	April 21, 2017	3.9%	4.8%
26	April 28, 2017	8.3%	6.8%
27	May 5, 2017	4.8%	4.7%
28	May 12, 2017	4.4%	4.2%
29	May 19, 2017	3.4%	3.7%

== Awards and nominations ==
Year	Award	Category	Recipients	Result
2016	15th KBS Entertainment Awards	Best Entertainer Award	Namkoong Min	Won
2016	15th KBS Entertainment Awards	Excellence Award	Lee Sang-min	Nominated

== International versions ==
Map of Singing Battle around the world. South Korea originated in blue.

Prior to its show's wide popular and success, they have their own its international versions:

Currently airing
Upcoming season
Ceased to air

Country	Local Title	Host	Channel	Broadcast Timeline
Indonesia	Singing Battle Indonesia	Indra Herlambang (episodes 1–3); Arie Untung (episodes 4–10) (season 1); John Martin Tumbel (season 2)	GTV (Indonesia)	Season 1: January 26, 2018; Season 2: June 6, 2020
