= Bae Ki-sung =

South Korean entertainer (born 1972)

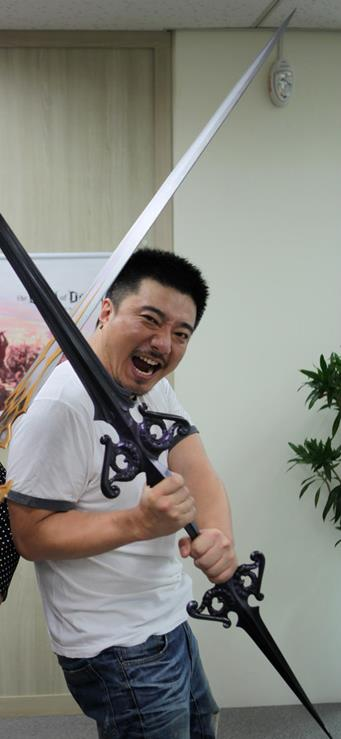
- Bae in 2011
- Born: March 13, 1972 (age 54); Busan, South Korea
- Education: Busan Kyungsang College – Broadcasting and Art
- Occupations: Singer; radio presenter
- Years active: 1993–present
- Agent: PA Entertainment

Korean name
- Hangul: 배기성
- Hanja: 裵起成
- RR: Bae Giseong
- MR: Pae Kisŏng

Bae Ki-sung (Korean: 배기성; born March 13, 1972) is a South Korean singer and radio presenter. He and Lee Jong-won form the duo Can, which rose to fame upon the release of their debut album Version 1.0 in 1998.

== Discography ==
=== Solo artist ===
| Year | Title | Album | Notes |
|---|---|---|---|
| 1998 | "I Can't Trust You" | Shy Lovers OST | |
| 1999 | "Just Like the First Time" | Attack the Gas Station OST | |
| 2007 | "Alcoholic Drink" | Alcoholic Drink | |
| 2008 | "Money Money" | "Tazza" | |
| 2008 | "Run, Run" | "EMP" | |
| 2009 | "Last Hero" | "Hero" | |
| 2010 | "Bravo" | "Queen of Reversals OST" | |
| 2010 | "Living in Style" | "Living in Style OST" | |
| 2015 | "Hwang Jini" | "Immortal Songs: Singing the Legend" | |
| 2022 | "Shine On You With Blinding Flash of Light" | "25, 21 OST" | |

== Filmography ==
=== Television drama ===
| Year | Title | Role |
|---|---|---|
| 2011 | The Clinic for Married Couples: Love and War | Aide of congressman |
| 2012 | Sent From Heaven | CEO. Yong |
| 2013 | Fantasy Tower | English teacher |
| 2014 | Mental Shooter | Boss of wine shop |

=== Film ===
| Year | Title | Role | Notes |
|---|---|---|---|
| 2004 | Who's Got the Tape? | Masked man | |
| 2013 | Sign Hard | | short |

== Stage and musical theatre ==
| Year | Title | Role |
|---|---|---|
| 2012 | Arirang Fantasy | Vocal trainer |
| 2013 | Wedding Singer | Glen |
