= Can (duo) =

South Korean male duo

Can 캔
- Origin: South Korea
- Genres: Hard rock; K-rock; pop rock; electropop; dance pop; K-pop
- Years active: 1998–present
- Labels: JJ Holic Media
- Members: Lee Jong-won; Bae Ki-sung
- Past members: Yoo Hae-jun

Can (Korean: 캔) is a South Korean male duo formed in 1998. Their members consist of Lee Jong-won and Bae Ki-sung. Can is currently signed to JJ Holic Media. Can released their first album, Version 1.0 on October 18, 1998.

== Discography ==
=== Albums ===
- Version 1.0 (1998)
- Genderless (2000)
- Can with Piano (2001)
- Gray Market (2003)
- My Way (2005)
- Old & New (2006)
- Hot Summer Play (2007)
- The 10th Anniversary - Variation (2008)

== Awards and nominations ==
Year	Award	Category	Result
2002	KBS Music Awards	Award for Youth	Won
2002	SBS Gayo Daejeon	Award for Drama OST	Won
2006	Seoul Music Awards	Sports Seoul Achievement Award	Won
